= List of Treasures of South Korea (1990–1994) =

The Treasures of South Korea designation was established in 1962 and is managed by the Korea Heritage Service (KHS; formerly "Cultural Heritage Administration"). This designation is distinct from the National Treasure designation. Covered here are items designated in the years 1990 through 1994.

== List ==
No. (Note: On November 19, 2021, the Cultural Heritage Administration removed the numbering system for all of its designations, including Treasure. Previously assigned numbers are preserved here for the sake of reference.)	Image	Official names (Note: (English, Hangul, Hanja/mixed script))	Location	Dates	Refs
1018		Documents of the Yean Branch of the Gwangsan Kim Clan 광산김씨 예안파 종가 고문서 光山金氏 禮安派 宗家 古文書	Andong, North Gyeongsang	1990-03-02	
1019		Books of the Yean Branch of the Gwangsan Kim Clan 광산김씨 예안파 종가 전적 光山金氏 禮安派 宗家 典籍	Andong, North Gyeongsang	1990-03-02	
1020		Records of Property Inheritance of Kim Gwang-ryeo and His Siblings 김광려 삼남매 화회문기 金光礪 三男妹 和會文記	Jinju, South Gyeongsang	1990-03-02	
~~1021~~		~~Stone Seated Vairocana Buddha from Seongnamam Hermitage Site, Sancheong~~; ~~산청 석남암사지 석조비로자나불좌상~~; ~~山淸 石南巖寺址 石造毘盧遮那佛坐像~~	~~Sancheong County, South Gyeongsang~~	1990-03-02, 2010-08-25 renamed, 2016-01-07 removed, made National Treasure No. 233-1	
1022		Celadon Bottle with Inlaid Lotus, Scroll, and Dragon Design in Underglaze Copper 청자 상감동채연화당초용문 병 靑磁 象嵌銅彩蓮花唐草龍文 甁	Gwanak District, Seoul	1990-05-21	
1023		Celadon Lidded Bowl with Incised Cloud and Dragon Design and Inscription of "Sangyakguk (Bureau of Medicine)" 청자 음각‘상약국’명 운룡문 합 靑磁 陰刻‘尙藥局’銘 雲龍文 盒	Yongsan District, Seoul	1990-05-21	
1024		Celadon Bowl with Lotus and Scroll Design in Relief and Inlaid Cloud and Crane Design 청자 양각연화당초 상감운학문 완 靑磁 陰刻蓮花唐草 象嵌雲鶴文 碗	Yongin, Gyeonggi	1990-05-21	
1025		Celadon Peach-shaped Water Dropper 청자 복숭아모양 연적 靑磁 桃形 硯滴	Yongsan District, Seoul	1990-05-21	
1026		Celadon Square Incense Burner with Goblin Design in Relief 청자 양각도철문 방형 향로 靑磁 陽刻饕餮文 方形 香爐	Yongin, Gyeonggi	1990-05-21	
1027		Celadon Incense Burner with Lid in the Shape of a Turtle-dragon 청자 구룡형뚜껑 향로 靑磁 龜龍形蓋 香爐	Yongsan District, Seoul	1990-05-21	
1028		Celadon Jar with Incised Lotus and Scroll Design 청자 음각연화당초문 항아리 靑磁 陰刻蓮花唐草文 壺	Yongsan District, Seoul	1990-05-21	
1029		Celadon Ewer with Inlaid Peony Design 청자 상감모란문 주전자 靑磁 象嵌牡丹文 注子	Yongsan District, Seoul	1990-05-21	
1030		Celadon Flowerpot with Inlaid Cloud and Crane Design 청자 상감운학문 화분 靑磁 象嵌雲鶴文 花盆	Yongin, Gyeonggi	1990-05-21	
1031		Celadon Flower-shaped Dish with Lotus Pond and Fish Design in Relief 청자 양각연지어문 화형 접시 靑磁 陽刻蓮池魚文 花形 楪匙	Yongsan District, Seoul	1990-05-21	
1032		Celadon Bowl with Incised Lotus and Scroll Design and Inlaid Chrysanthemum Design 청자 음각연화당초 상감국화문 완 靑磁 陰刻蓮花唐草 象嵌菊花文 碗	Yongin, Gyeonggi	1990-05-21	
1033		Celadon Gourd-shaped Ewer and Saucer with Inlaid Cloud, Crane, and Chrysanthemum Design 청자 상감운학국화문 표주박모양 주전자 및 승반 靑磁 象嵌雲鶴菊花文 瓢形 注子 및 承盤	Seocho District, Seoul	1990-05-21	
1034		Celadon Prunus Vase with Inlaid Lotus Design 청자 상감연판문 매병 靑磁 象嵌蓮瓣文 梅甁	Seocho District, Seoul	1990-05-21	
1035		Celadon Bottle with Incised Cloud Design 청자 음각운문 병 靑磁 陰刻雲文 甁	Yongsan District, Seoul	1990-05-21	
1036		Celadon Gourd-shaped Ewer with Inlaid Parrot Design 청자 상감앵무문 표주박모양 주전자 靑磁 象嵌鸚鵡文 瓢形 注子	Yongsan District, Seoul	1990-05-21	
1037		Celadon Bowl with Incised Chrysanthemum and Scroll Design 청자 음각국화당초문 완 靑磁 陰刻菊花唐草文 盌	Yongsan District, Seoul	1990-05-21	
1038		Celadon Bottle with Lotus Design in Relief and Underglaze Iron 청자 철채양각연판문 병 靑磁 鐵彩陽刻蓮瓣文 甁	Yongsan District, Seoul	1990-05-21	
1039		Celadon Bowls and Dish with Inlaid Peony Design 청자 상감모란문 발우 및 접시 靑磁 象嵌牡丹文 鉢盂 및 楪匙	Yongsan District, Seoul	1990-05-21	
1040		Stone Avatamsaka Sutra (The Flower Garland Sutra) of Hwaeomsa Temple, Gurye 구례화엄사화엄석경 求禮華嚴寺華嚴石經	Gurye County, South Jeolla	1990-05-21	
1041		Buddhist Painting in Yeongsanjeon Hall of Tongdosa Temple (The Eight Great Events) 통도사영산전팔상도 通度寺靈山殿八相圖	Yangsan, South Gyeongsang	1990-09-20	
1042		Buddhist Painting in Daegwangmyeongjeon Hall of Tongdosa Temple (Buddha Triad) 통도사대광명전삼신불도 通度寺大光明殿三身佛圖	Yangsan, South Gyeongsang	1990-09-20	
1043		Portrait of Sixteen Buddhist Monks in Songgwangsa Temple, Suncheon 순천 송광사 십육조사진영 順天 松廣寺 十六祖師眞影	Suncheon, South Jeolla	1990-09-20	
1044		Portrait of State Preceptor Daegak in Seonamsa Temple, Suncheon 순천 선암사 대각국사 의천 진영 順天 仙巖寺 大覺國師 義天 眞影	Suncheon, South Jeolla	1990-09-20	
1045		Sinhaesaeng gaphoejido (Gathering of Elders of the Same Age) 신해생갑회지도 辛亥生甲會之圖	Yongsan District, Seoul	1990-09-20	
1046		Hwagaehyeon gujangdo (Old House of Hwagae-hyeon) 화개현구장도 花開縣舊莊圖	Yongsan District, Seoul	1990-09-20	
1047		Gilt-bronze Seated Mahasthamaprapta Bodhisattva 금동대세지보살좌상 金銅大勢至菩薩坐像	Gwanak District, Seoul	1990-09-20	
1048		Painting of Ksitigarbha Bodhisattva and Ten Underworld Kings 지장시왕도 地藏十王圖	Gwanak District, Seoul	1990-09-20	
1049		Shurangama Sutra (The Sutra of the Heroic One), Korean Translation, Volume 6 대불정여래밀인수증료의제보살만행수능엄경(언해) 권6 大佛頂如來密因修證了義諸菩薩萬行首楞嚴經(諺解) 卷六	Danyang County, North Chungcheong	1990-09-20	
1050		Amitabha Buddha Sutra, Korean Translation 불설아미타경(언해) 佛說阿彌陀經(諺解)	Danyang County, North Chungcheong	1990-09-20	
1051-1		Poems by Du Fu, Korean Translation, Volume 13 분류두공부시(언해) 권13 分類杜工部詩(諺解) 卷十三	Yongin, Gyeonggi	1990-09-20	
1051-2		Poems by Du Fu, Korean Translation, Volumes 11 and 12 분류두공부시(언해) 권11~12 分類杜工部詩(諺解) 卷十一~十二	Dalseo District, Daegu	2001-08-03	
1051-3		Poems by Du Fu, Korean Translation, Volume 21 분류두공부시(언해) 권21 分類杜工部詩(諺解) 卷二十一	Cheongju, North Chungcheong	2004-05-07	
1051-4		Poems by Du Fu, Korean Translation, Volumes 17-19 분류두공부시(언해)권17~19 分類杜工部詩(諺解)卷十七~十九	Seongnam, Gyeonggi	2011-11-01	
1051-5		분류두공부시(언해) 권11 (分類杜工部詩(諺解)卷十一)	Dongdaemun District, Seoul	2020-12-22	
1052		Cheontae sagyoui (Essentials of the Four Stages of Teaching in Tientai) 천태사교의 天台四敎儀	Yongin, Gyeonggi	1990-09-20	
1053		Jineon gwongong (Buddhist Rituals), Korean Translation 진언권공(언해) 眞言勸供(諺解)	Yongin, Gyeonggi	1990-09-20	
569-21	가운데	Calligraphy by An Jung-geun 안중근의사유묵 - 욕보동양선개정계시과실기추회하급 安重根義士遺墨 - 欲保東洋先改政界時過失機追悔何及	Yongin, Gyeonggi	1991-07-12	
1054		White Porcelain Bottle 백자 병 白磁 甁	Yongsan District, Seoul	1991-01-25	
1055		White Porcelain Placenta Jars 백자 태항아리 白磁 胎壺	Gwanak District, Seoul	1991-01-25	
1056		White Porcelain Jar with Mountains and Lightening Design in Underglaze Cobalt Blue and Iron 백자 청화철화삼산뇌문 산뢰 白磁 靑畵鐵畵三山雷文 山罍	Yongsan District, Seoul	1991-01-25	
1057		White Porcelain Dish with Grass and Insect Design and Inscription of “Mangudae” in Underglaze Cobalt Blue 백자 청화 '망우대‘명 초충문 접시 白磁 靑畵 ‘忘憂臺‘銘 草蟲文 楪匙	Yongsan District, Seoul	1991-01-25	
1058		White Porcelain Bottle with Auspicious-character and Orchid Design in Underglaze Cobalt Blue 백자 청화칠보난초문 병 白磁 靑畵七寶蘭草文 甁	Yongsan District, Seoul	1991-01-25	
1059		White Porcelain Brush Container with Floral Design in Underglaze Cobalt Blue 백자 청화초화문 필통 白磁 靑畵草花文 筆筒	Yongsan District, Seoul	1991-01-25	
1060		White Porcelain Bottle with String Design in Underglaze Iron 백자 철화끈무늬 병 白磁 鐵畵垂紐文 甁	Yongsan District, Seoul	1991-01-25	
1061		White Porcelain Horn Cup with Coloring in Underglaze Iron 백자 철채 뿔잔 白磁 鐵彩 角杯	Yongsan District, Seoul	1991-01-25	
1062		Buncheong Barrel-shaped Vessel with Scroll Design in Underglaze Iron 분청사기 철화당초문 장군 粉靑沙器 鐵畵唐草文 獐本	Gwanak District, Seoul	1991-01-25	
1063		White Porcelain Octagonal Dish with Plum, Moon, and Ten Symbols of Longevity Design in Underglaze Cobalt Blue 백자 청화매월십장생문 팔각접시 白磁 靑畵梅月十長生文 八角楪匙	Seocho District, Seoul	1991-01-25	
1064		White Porcelain Jar with Cloud and Dragon Design in Underglaze Cobalt Blue 백자 청화운룡문 항아리 白磁 靑畵雲龍文 立壺	Yongsan District, Seoul	1991-01-25	
1065		White Porcelain Placenta Jars and Stone Placenta Tablet 백자 태항아리 및 태지석 白磁 胎壺 및 胎誌石	Yongin, Gyeonggi	1991-01-25	
1066		White Porcelain Octagonal Bottle with Flower and Bird Design in Underglaze Cobalt Blue 백자 청화화조문 팔각통형 병 白磁 靑畵花鳥文 八角筒形 甁	Yongsan District, Seoul	1990-05-21	
1067		Buncheong Bottle with Inlaid Lotus and Scroll Design 분청사기 상감연화당초문 병 粉靑沙器 象嵌蓮花唐草文 甁	Yongsan District, Seoul	1991-01-25	
1068		Buncheong Lidded Jar with Inlaid Peony and Scroll Design 분청사기 상감모란당초문 유개항아리 粉靑沙器 象嵌牡丹唐草文 有蓋壺	Gwanak District, Seoul	1991-01-25	
1069		Buncheong Flat Bottle with Incised Tree and Bird Design 분청사기 음각수조문 편병 粉靑沙器 陰刻樹鳥文 扁甁	Yongsan District, Seoul	1991-01-25	
1070		Buncheong Barrel-shaped Vessel with Sgraffito Peony Design 분청사기 박지모란문 장군 粉靑沙器 剝地牡丹文 獐本	Yongsan District, Seoul	1991-01-25	
1071		Celadon Lidded Jar 청자 유개항아리 靑磁 有蓋壺	Gwanak District, Seoul	1991-01-25	
1072		Bulseol ubasaeo gyesanggyeong, the First Tripitaka Koreana Edition 초조본불설우바새오계상경 初雕本佛說優婆塞五戒相經	Gwanak District, Seoul	1991-07-12	
1073		Abhidharma jnanaprasthana Sastra, the First Tripitaka Koreana Edition, Volume 24 초조본 아비담팔건도론 권24 初雕本 阿毗曇八揵度論 卷二十四	Gwanak District, Seoul	1991-07-12	
1074		Abhidharma vijnana kaya pada Sastra (Discourse on Consciousness Body), the First Tripitaka Koreana Edition, Volume 13 초조본 아비달마식신족론 권13 初雕本 阿毗達磨識身足論 卷十三	Gwanak District, Seoul	1991-07-12	
1075		Abhidharma vibhasa Sastra (Explanatory of the Abhidharma), the First Tripitaka Koreana Edition, Volume 16 초조본 아비담비파사론 권16 初雕本 阿毗曇毗婆沙論 卷十六	Gwanak District, Seoul	1991-07-12	
1076		Certificate of Meritorious Subject Issued to Kim Cheon-ri 김천리개국원종공신록권 金天理開國原從攻臣錄卷	Jongno District, Seoul	1991-07-12	
1077-1		Geunsarok (Reflections on Things at Hand), Volumes 1-3 and 9-14 근사록 권1~3, 9~14 近思錄 卷一~三, 九~十四	Yongsan District, Seoul	1991-07-12	
1078		Calligraphy by Han Ho 한호 필적 - 한석봉증유여장서첩 韓濩 筆蹟 - 韓石峯贈柳汝章書帖	Jinju, South Gyeongsang	1991-07-12	
1079		Hongmu yeje (Rituals from the Hongwu Reign) 홍무예제 洪武禮制	Yongsan District, Seoul	1991-07-12	
1080		Annotated Mahavaipulya purnabudha Sutra (The Complete Enlightenment Sutra), Volume 1 대방광원각략소주경 권상 大方廣圓覺略疏註經 卷上	Yongsan District, Seoul	1991-07-12	
1081		Saddharmapundarika Sutra (The Lotus Sutra) 묘법연화경 妙法蓮華經	Yongsan District, Seoul	1991-07-12	
1082		Vajracchedika prajnaparamita Sutra (The Diamond Sutra) 금강반야바라밀경 金剛般若波羅蜜經	Yongsan District, Seoul	1991-07-12	
1083		Avatamsaka Sutra (The Flower Garland Sutra), Zhenyuan Version, Volume 20 대방광불화엄경 정원본 권20 大方廣佛華嚴經 貞元本 卷二十	Yongsan District, Seoul	1991-07-12	
~~1084~~		~~안중근의사유묵~~; ~~安重根義士遺墨~~	~~Yongsan District, Seoul~~	1991-07-12, 2000-02-15 removed, Made Treasure No. 569-21	
~~1085-1~~		~~Dongui bogam (Principles and Practice of Eastern Medicine)~~; ~~동의보감~~; ~~東醫寶鑑~~	~~Seocho District, Seoul~~	1991-09-30, 2015-06-22 removed, made National Treasure No. 319-1	
~~1085-2~~		~~Dongui bogam (Principles and Practice of Eastern Medicine)~~; ~~동의보감~~; ~~東醫寶鑑~~	~~Seongnam, Gyeonggi~~	2008-08-28, 2015-06-22 removed, made National Treasure No. 319-2	
~~1085-3~~		~~Dongui bogam (Principles and Practice of Eastern Medicine)~~; ~~동의보감~~; ~~東醫寶鑑~~	~~Gwanak District, Seoul~~	2008-08-28, 2015-06-22 removed, made National Treasure No. 319-3	
1086		Byeogyeok sinbang (Prescriptions to Prevent Epidemics) 벽역신방 辟疫神方	Gwanak District, Seoul	1991-09-30	
1087		Sinchan byeogonbang (Prescriptions to Prevent Epidemics) 신찬벽온방 新纂辟瘟方	Seoul	1991-09-30	
1087-1		Sinchan byeogonbang (Prescriptions to Prevent Epidemics) 신찬벽온방 新纂辟瘟方	Gwanak District, Seoul	1991-09-30	
1088-1		Eonhae taesan jibyo (Book of Obstetrics, Korean Translation) 언해태산집요 諺解胎産集要	Seocho District, Seoul	1991-10-04	
1088-2		Eonhae taesan jibyo (Book of Obstetrics, Korean Translation) 언해태산집요 諺解胎産集要	Eumseong County, North Chungcheong	1991-12-16	
1089		Donginjimun ochil (Collected Poems of the Goryeo Dynasty), Volumes 7-9 동인지문오칠 권7~9 東人之文 五七 卷七~九	Jongno District, Seoul	1991-09-30	
1090-1		Gwon Geun Eungjesiju (Annotated Poems by Gwon Geun) 권근 응제시주 權近 應制詩註	Jongno District, Seoul	1991-10-04	
1090-2		Gwon Geun Eungjesiju (Annotated Poems by Gwon Geun) 권근 응제시주 權近 應制詩註	Jinju, South Gyeongsang	2005-07-05	
1091-1		Jewang ungi (Songs of Emperors and Kings) 제왕운기 帝王韻紀	Jongno District, Seoul	1991-09-30	
1091-2		Jewang ungi (Songs of Emperors and Kings) 제왕운기 帝王韻紀	Wonju, Gangwon	2011-11-01	
1092		Bulseol jangsu myeoljoe hojedongja daranigyeong 불설장수멸죄호제동자다라니경 佛說長壽滅罪護諸童子陀羅尼經	Jongno District, Seoul	1991-09-30	
1093		Bulgwa Hwanoseonsa byeogamnok (The Blue Cliff Record) 불과환오선사벽암록 佛果圜悟禪師碧巖錄	Jongno District, Seoul	1991-09-30	
1094		Incheon anmok (Vision of Five Supreme Patriarchs) 인천안목 人天眼目	Jongno District, Seoul	1991-09-30	
1095		Excavated Documents from the Wooden Seated Amitabha Buddha of Bongnimsa Temple, Hwaseong 화성 봉림사 목조아미타불좌상복장전적일괄 華城 鳳林寺 木造阿彌陀佛坐像腹藏典籍一括	Hwaseong, Gyeonggi	1991-09-30	
1096		Swaemirok (Diary) by O Hui-mun 오희문 쇄미록 吳希文 瑣尾錄	Jinju, South Gyeongsang	1991-09-30	
1097		Portrait of Yeom Je-sin 염제신초상 廉悌臣 肖像	Yongsan District, Seoul	1991-09-30	
1098		Transcription of Mireuk sambugyeong (Three Principal Scriptures of the Maitreya Sutra) in Silver on Indigo Paper 감지은니미륵삼부경 紺紙銀泥彌勒三部經	Gwanak District, Seoul	1991-12-16	
1099		Transcription of Mireuk hasaenggyeong (The Maitreya Sutra) in Gold on Indigo Paper 감지금니미륵하생경 紺紙金泥彌勒下生經	Gwanak District, Seoul	1991-12-16	
1100		Transcription of Bulseol bougyeong (The Sutra of Precious Rain) in Silver on Oak Paper, Volume 2 상지은니불설보우경 권2 橡紙銀泥佛說寶雨經 卷二	Gwanak District, Seoul	1991-12-16	
1101		Transcription of Maha prajnaparamita Sutra (Perfection of Transcendental Wisdom) in Silver on Oak Paper, Volume 305 상지은니대반야바라밀다경 권305 橡紙銀泥大般若波羅蜜多經 卷三百五	Gwanak District, Seoul	1991-12-16	
1102		Transcription of Maha prajnaparamita Sastra (Perfection of Wisdom) in Silver on Oak Paper, Volume 28 상지은니대지도론 권28 橡紙銀泥大智度論 卷二十八	Gwanak District, Seoul	1991-12-16	
1103		Transcription of Avatamsaka Sutra (The Flower Garland Sutra), Jin Version, in Silver on Indigo Paper, Volume 13 감지은니대방광불화엄경 진본 권13 紺紙銀泥大方廣佛華嚴經 晋本 卷十三	Gwanak District, Seoul	1991-12-16	
1104		Ksitigarbha pranidhana Sutra (Great Vows of Ksitigarbha Bodhisattva) 지장보살본원경 地藏菩薩本願經	Gwanak District, Seoul	1991-12-16	
1105		Suryuk mucha pyeongdeung jaeui chwaryo (Ritual Text for the Water and Land Ceremony) 수륙무차평등재의촬요 水陸無遮平等齋儀撮要	Gwanak District, Seoul	1991-12-16	
1106		Commentary on the Avatamsaka Sutra (The Flower Garland Sutra), Volumes 84, 100, and 117 대방광불화엄경소 권84, 100, 117 大方廣佛華嚴經疏 卷八十四, 百, 百十七	Gwanak District, Seoul	1991-12-16	
1107		Saddharmapundarika Sutra (The Lotus Sutra), Volumes 5-7 묘법연화경 권5~7 妙法蓮華經 卷五~七	Gwanak District, Seoul	1991-12-16	
1108		Nilakantha dharani (The Great Compassion Mantra) 불정심다라니경 佛頂心陀羅尼經	Gwanak District, Seoul	1991-09-30	
1109		Books of Imgoseowon Confucian Academy 임고서원 전적 臨皐書院 典籍	Yeongcheon, North Gyeongsang	1991-12-16	
1110-1		Portrait of Jeong Mong-ju 정몽주 초상 鄭夢周 肖像	Gyeongju, North Gyeongsang	1991-12-16	
1110-2		Portrait of Jeong Mong-ju 정몽주 초상 鄭夢周 肖像	Yongin, Gyeonggi	2011-12-23	
1111		Chando bangnon maekgyeol jipseong (Collection of Essays and Charts on Taking Pulses for Diagnoses), Volumes 1 and 3 찬도방론맥결집성 권1, 3 纂圖方論脈訣集成 卷一, 三	Eumseong County, North Chungcheong	1991-12-16	
1112		Multi-story Stone Pagoda of Daewonsa Temple, Sancheong 산청 대원사 다층석탑 山淸 大源寺 多層石塔	Sancheong County, South Gyeongsang	1992-01-15, 2010-12-27 renamed	
1113		Three-story Stone Pagoda of Naewonsa Temple, Sancheong 산청 내원사 삼층석탑 山淸 內院寺 三層石塔	Sancheong County, South Gyeongsang	1992-01-15, 2010-12-27 renamed	
1114		Three-story Stone Pagoda in Daepo-ri, Sancheong 산청 대포리 삼층석탑 山淸 大浦里 三層石塔	Sancheong County, South Gyeongsang	1992-01-15, 2010-12-27 renamed	
1115		Five-story Stone Pagoda in Bongcheon-ri, Boseong 보성 봉천리 오층석탑 寶城 鳳川里 五層石塔	Boseong County, South Jeolla	1992-01-15, 2010-12-27 renamed	
1116		Stupa of Buddhist Monk Haeryeon at Yumasa Temple, Hwasun 화순 유마사 해련탑 和順 維摩寺 海蓮塔	Hwasun County, South Jeolla	1992-01-15, 2010-12-27 renamed	
1117		Stupa at Daegagam Hermitage of Seonamsa Temple, Suncheon 순천 선암사 대각암 승탑 順天 仙巖寺 大覺庵 僧塔	Suncheon, South Jeolla	1992-01-15, 2010-12-27 renamed	
1118		Five-story Stone Pagoda at Seongpungsa Temple Site, Yeongam 영암 성풍사지 오층석탑 靈巖 聖風寺址 五層石塔	Yeongam County, South Jeolla	1992-01-15, 2010-12-27 renamed	
1119		Octagonal Seven-story Stone Pagoda of Changgyeonggung Palace 창경궁 팔각칠층석탑 昌慶宮 八角七層石塔	Jongno District, Seoul	1992-01-15	
1120		Daegwangjeon Hall of Sinheungsa Temple, Yangsan 양산 신흥사 대광전 梁山 新興寺 大光殿	Yangsan, South Gyeongsang	1992-01-15	
1121		Stone Seated Vairocana Buddha in Geumbong-ri, Seongju 성주 금봉리 석조비로자나불좌상 星州 金鳳里 石造毘盧遮那佛坐像	Seongju County, North Gyeongsang	1992-01-15, 2010-08-25 renamed	
1122		Rock-carved Standing Buddha in Hwangsang-dong, Gumi 구미 황상동 마애여래입상 龜尾 凰顙洞 磨崖如來立像	Gumi, North Gyeongsang	1992-01-15	
1123		Rock-carved Buddhas at Gaeryeongam Hermitage Site, Namwon 남원 개령암지 마애불상군 南原 開嶺庵址 磨崖佛像群	Namwon, North Jeolla	1992-01-15, 2010-08-25 renamed	
1124		Commentary on the Avatamsaka Sutra (The Flower Garland Sutra), Volume 30 대방광불화엄경소 권30 大方廣佛華嚴經疏 卷三十	Yongsan District, Seoul	1992-04-20	
1125		Bulseol daebo bumo eunjunggyeong (Sakyamuni's Teaching on Parental Love) 불설대보부모은중경 佛說大報父母恩重經	Yongsan District, Seoul	1992-04-20	
1126		Commentary on the Avatamsaka Sutra (The Flower Garland Sutra) 대방광불화엄경보현행원품별행소 大方廣佛華嚴經普賢行願品別行疏	Yongsan District, Seoul	1992-04-20	
1127		Vajracchedika prajnaparamita Sutra (The Diamond Sutra) with Commentaries by Cheon No-hae 천노해 금강반야바라밀경 川老解 金剛般若波羅蜜經	Yongsan District, Seoul	1992-04-20	
1128		Commentary on the Avatamsaka Sutra (The Flower Garland Sutra), Volumes 21 and 24 대방광불화엄경소 권21, 24 大方廣佛華嚴經疏 卷二十一, 二十四	Seongnam, Gyeonggi	1992-04-20	
1129		Dharani Sutra 대불정다라니 大佛頂陀羅尼	Seongnam, Gyeonggi	1992-04-20	
1130		Bhaisajyaguru Sutra 약사유리광여래본원공덕경 藥師瑠璃光如來本願功德經	Seongnam, Gyeonggi	1992-04-20	
1131		Brahmajala Sutra (The Sutra of Brahma’s Net), Part 2 of Volume 10 범망경노사나불설보살심지계품 제10의하 梵綱經盧舍那佛說菩薩心地戒品 第十之下	Seongnam, Gyeonggi	1992-04-20	
1132		Baegun hwasang chorok buljo jikji simche yojeol (Anthology of Great Buddhist Priests’ Zen Teachings) 백운화상초록불조직지심체요절 白雲和尙抄錄佛祖直指心體要節	Seongnam, Gyeonggi	1992-04-20	
1133		Royal Certificate of Meritorious Subject Issued to Won Gyun 원균 선무공신교서 元均 宣武功臣敎書	Yongin, Gyeonggi	1992-04-20	
1134		Wooden Child Manjusri and Samantabhadra of Dogapsa Temple, Yeongam 영암 도갑사 목조문수·보현동자상 靈巖 道岬寺 木造文殊·普賢童子像	Yeongam County, South Jeolla	1992-07-28	
1135		Royal Edict Awarding Land and Slaves to Jo On 조온 사패왕지 趙溫 賜牌王旨	Seongnam, Gyeonggi	1992-07-28	
1136-1		Iphak doseol (Diagrammatic Treatises for the Commencement of Learning) 입학도설 入學圖說	Seongnam, Gyeonggi	1992-07-28	
1136-2		Iphak doseol (Diagrammatic Treatises for the Commencement of Learning) 입학도설 入學圖說	Gumi, North Gyeongsang	2011-04-29	
1137		Transcription of Avatamsaka Sutra (The Flower Garland Sutra), Zhenyuan Version, in Silver on Oak Paper, Volume 4 상지은니대방광불화엄경 정원본 권4 橡紙銀泥大方廣佛華嚴經 貞元本 卷四	Yongsan District, Seoul	1992-07-28	
1138		Transcription of Saddharmapundarika Sutra (The Lotus Sutra) in Gold on Indigo Paper, Volume 7 감지금니 묘법연화경 권7 紺紙金泥妙法蓮華經 卷七	Yongsan District, Seoul	1992-07-28	
1139		Transcription of Saddharmapundarika Sutra (The Lotus Sutra) in Ink on White Paper, Volume 7 백지묵서 묘법연화경 권7 白紙墨書 妙法蓮華經 卷七	Yongsan District, Seoul	1992-07-28	
1140		Saddharmapundarika Sutra (The Lotus Sutra), Korean Translation, Volume 3 묘법연화경(언해) 권3 妙法蓮華經(諺解) 卷三	Yongsan District, Seoul	1992-07-28	
1141		Gilt-bronze Padlocks and Gong of Hancheonsa Temple, Yecheon 예천 한천사 금동 자물쇠 및 쇠북 醴泉 寒天寺 金銅鎖金 및 金鼓	Gimcheon, North Gyeongsang	1992-07-28	
1142		Seonmun samga yeomsongjip (Book of Reciting of Zen Buddhism), Volume 1 선문삼가염송집 권1 禪門三家拈頌集 卷一	Seodaemun District, Seoul	1992-12-11	
1143		Jabi doryang chambeop (Repentance Ritual of the Great Compassion), Revised Version, Volumes 4-6 상교정본 자비도량참법 권4~6 詳校正本 慈悲道場懺法 卷四∼六	Seodaemun District, Seoul	1992-12-11	
1144		Yenyeom mita doryang chambeop (Contrition in the Name of Amitabha Buddha), Volumes 6-10 예념미타도량참법 권6~10 禮念彌陀道場懺法 卷六∼十	Yeoju, Gyeonggi	1992-12-11	
1145		Saddharmapundarika Sutra (The Lotus Sutra), Volume 1 묘법연화경 권1 妙法蓮華經 卷一	Yeoju, Gyeonggi	1992-12-11	
1146		Avatamsaka Sutra (The Flower Garland Sutra), Zhenyuan Version, Volume 24 대방광불화엄경 정원본 권24 大方廣彿華嚴經 貞元本 卷二十四	Yeoju, Gyeonggi	1992-12-11	
1147-1		Saddharmapundarika Sutra (The Lotus Sutra), Volumes 3, 4 and 5-7 묘법연화경 권3~4, 5~7 妙法蓮華經 卷三∼四, 五∼七	Seodaemun District, Seoul	1993-01-15	
1148		Beopjip byeolhaengnok jeoryo byeongipsagi (Excerpts from the Dharma Collection and Special Practice Record with Personal Notes) 법집별행록절요병입사기 法集別行錄節要幷入私記	Yongin, Gyeonggi	1993-01-15	
1149		Singan pyoje gongja gaeo guhae (Sayings of Confucius with Commentaries) 신간표제공자가어구해 新刊標題孔子家語句解	Yongin, Gyeonggi	1993-01-15	
~~1150~~		~~안중근의사유묵~~; ~~安重根義士遺墨~~	~~Jung District, Seoul~~	1993-01-15, 2000-02-15 removed, made Treasure No. 569-22 and No. 569-23	
1151		Lacquered Bronze Stirrups 청동 옻칠 발걸이 靑銅黑漆壺鐙	Gyeongju, North Gyeongsang	1993-01-15	
1152		Bronze Artifacts from Jukdong-ri, Gyeongju 경주 죽동리 청동기 일괄 慶州 竹東里 靑銅器 一括	Gyeongju, North Gyeongsang	1993-01-15	
1153		Saddharmapundarika Sutra (The Lotus Sutra), Volumes 1-3 묘법연화경 권1~3 妙法蓮華經 卷一~三	Wonju, Gangwon	1993-04-27	
1154		Avatamsaka Sutra (The Flower Garland Sutra), Zhenyuan Version, Volume 31 대방광불화엄경 정원본 권31 大方廣佛華嚴經 貞元本 卷三十一	Yeonsu District, Incheon	1993-04-27	
1155		Gyeongnyul isang, the Second Tripitaka Koreana Edition, Volume 1 재조본 경률이상 권1 再雕本 經律異相 卷一	Yeonsu District, Incheon	1993-04-27	
1156		Gyeongnyul isang, the Second Tripitaka Koreana Edition, Volume 8 재조본 경률이상 권8 再雕本 經律異相 卷八	Yongsan District, Seoul	1993-04-27	
1157-1		Seongni daejeon seo jeoryo (Essentials of the Great Collection of Neo-Confucianism) 성리대전서절요 性理大全書節要	Yongsan District, Seoul	1993-04-27	
1157-2		Seongni daejeon seo jeoryo (Essentials of the Great Collection of Neo-Confucianism) 성리대전서절요 性理大全書節要	Cheongju, North Chungcheong	2004-05-07	
1158		Gogeum unhoe geoyo (Condensed Version of Ancient and Modern Collection of Rhymes), Volumes 27-30 고금운회거요 권27~30 古今韻會擧要 卷二十七~三十	Yongsan District, Seoul	1993-04-27	
1159		Eumju jeonmun chunchu gwallye simal jwajeon gudok jikhae (Zuozhuan with Commentaries), Volumes 62-70 음주전문춘추괄례시말좌전구독직해 권62~70 音註全文春秋括例始末左傳句讀直解 卷六十二~七十	Yongsan District, Seoul	1993-04-27	
1160		Certificate of Meritorious Subject Issued to Jin Chung-gwi 진충귀개국원종공신녹권 陳忠貴開國原從功臣錄券	Yongsan District, Seoul	1993-06-15	
1161		Royal Edict of Appointment Issued to Jin Chung-gwi 진충귀 고신왕지 陳忠貴告身王旨	Yongsan District, Seoul	1993-06-15	
1162		Saddharmapundarika Samadhi (Meditation on the Lotus Stura), Volume 2 묘법연화경삼매참법 권하 妙法蓮華經三昧懺法 卷下	Danyang County, North Chungcheong	1993-06-15	
1163		Seonjong yeonggajip (Essence of Zen Buddhism), Korean Translation, Volume 2 선종영가집(언해) 권하 禪宗永嘉集(諺解) 卷下	Jongno District, Seoul	1993-06-15	
1164-1		Saddharmapundarika Sutra (The Lotus Sutra), Volumes 3 and 4 묘법연화경 권3~4 妙法蓮華經 卷三~四	Seocho District, Seoul	1993-06-15	
1165		Yenyeom mita doryang chambeop (Contrition in the Name of Amitabha Buddha), Volumes 3, 4, 7, and 8 예념미타도량참법 권3~4, 7~8 禮念彌陀道場懺法 卷三~四, 七~八	Daedeok District, Daejeon	1993-06-15	
1166		Bronze Bell Excavated from Yeoju 여주 출토 동종 驪州 出土 銅鍾	Yongsan District, Seoul	1993-09-10	
1167		Bronze Bell Excavated from Uncheon-dong, Cheongju 청주 운천동 출토 동종 淸州 雲泉洞 出土 銅鍾	Cheongju, North Chungcheong	1993-09-10	
1168		Celadon Prunus Vase with Inlaid Plum, Bamboo, and Crane Design 청자 상감매죽학문 매병 靑磁 象嵌梅竹鶴文 梅甁	Yongsan District, Seoul	1993-09-10	
1169		White Porcelain Placenta Jars and Stone Placenta Tablet 백자 태항아리 및 태지석 白磁 胎壺 및 胎誌石	Gwanak District, Seoul	1993-09-10	
~~1170~~		~~Jabi doryang chambeop (Repentance Ritual of the Great Compassion), Revised Version, Volumes 1-3~~; ~~상교정본자비도량참법 권1~3~~; ~~詳校正本慈悲道場懺法 卷一~三~~	~~Gwanak District, Seoul~~	1993-09-10, 2019-01-03 redesignated Treasure No. 875-2	
1171		Annotated Mahavaipulya purnabudha Sutra (The Complete Enlightenment Sutra), Part 2 of Volume 2 대방광원각략소주경 권하의2 大方廣圓覺略疏注經 卷下之二	Gwanak District, Seoul	1993-09-10	
~~1172~~		~~Mongsanhwasang beobeo yangnok (Sermons of Buddhist Monk Mongsan with Commentaries in Korean)~~; ~~몽산화상법어략록(언해)~~; ~~蒙山和尙法語略錄(諺解)~~	~~Gwanak District, Seoul~~	1993-09-10, 2017-03-08 redesignated Treasure No. 767-3	
~~1173~~		~~남은유서분재기부남재왕지~~; ~~南誾遺書分財記附南在王旨~~	~~Yongin, Gyeonggi~~	1993-09-10, 2010-08-25 removed	
1174-1		Royal Certificate of Meritorious Subject Issued to Yi Jung-ro and Portrait of Yi Jung-ro 이중로정사공신교서 및 초상 - 이중로정사공신교서 李重老靖社功臣敎書 및 肖像 - 李重老靖社功臣敎書	Yongin, Gyeonggi	1993-11-05	
1175		Royal Certificate of Meritorious Subject Issued to Sim Dae 심대 호성공신교서 沈岱 扈聖功臣敎書	Yongin, Gyeonggi	1993-11-05	
1176		Portrait of Yu Su 유수 초상 柳綏 肖像	Yongin, Gyeonggi	1993-11-05	
1177		Portrait of O Myeong-hang and Royal Certificate of Meritorious Subject Issued to O Myeong-hang 오명항초상 및 양무공신교서 吳命恒肖像 및 揚武功臣敎書	Yongin, Gyeonggi	1993-11-05	
1178		Hyangyak jesaeng jipseongbang (Collection of Native Prescriptions for Saving Lives), Volume 6 향약제생집성방 권6 鄕藥濟生集成方 卷六	Yeonsu District, Incheon	1993-11-05	
1179		Taesan yorok (Book of Obstetrics) 태산요록 胎産要錄	Yeonsu District, Incheon	1993-11-05	
1180		Sineunggyeong (Book of Acupuncture) 신응경 神應經	Yeonsu District, Incheon	1993-11-05	
1181		Village Code of Gohyeon-dong, Taein 태인고현동향약 泰仁古縣洞鄕約	Jeongeup, North Jeolla	1993-11-05	
1182		Wooden Seated Amitabha Buddha and Excavated Relics of Baekdamsa Temple, Inje 인제 백담사 목조아미타여래좌상 및 복장유물 麟蹄 百潭寺 木造阿彌陀如來坐像 및 腹藏遺物	Inje County, Gangwon	1993-11-05	
1183		Eungjindang Hall of Mihwangsa Temple, Haenam 해남 미황사 응진당 海南 美黃寺 應眞堂	Haenam County, South Jeolla	1993-11-19	
1184		North Stupa of Seonamsa Temple, Suncheon 순천 선암사 북 승탑 順天 仙巖寺 北 僧塔	Suncheon, South Jeolla	1993-11-19, 2010-12-27 renamed	
1185		East Stupa of Seonamsa Temple, Suncheon 순천 선암사 동 승탑 順天 仙巖寺 東 僧塔	Suncheon, South Jeolla	1993-11-19, 2010-12-27 renamed	
1186		Three-story Stone Pagoda from Gangnaksa Temple Site, Gumi (Presumed) (전)구미 강락사지 삼층석탑 傳 龜尾 江洛寺址 三層石塔	Gimcheon, North Gyeongsang	1993-11-19, 2010-12-27 renamed	
1187		Five-story Stone Pagoda of Bultapsa Temple, Jeju 제주 불탑사 오층석탑 濟州 佛塔寺 五層石塔	Jeju City, Jeju	1993-11-19, 2010-12-27 renamed	
1188		Three-story Stone Pagoda at Cheollyongsa Temple Site in Namsan Mountain, Gyeongju 경주 남산 천룡사지 삼층석탑 慶州 南山 天龍寺址 三層石塔	Gyeongju, North Gyeongsang	1993-12-29, 2010-12-27 renamed	
1189-1		Portrait of Bak Mun-su 박문수초상 朴文秀 肖像	Cheonan, South Chungcheong	1994-01-05	
1190		Portrait of O Ja-chi 오자치 초상 吳自治 肖像	Jongno District, Seoul	1994-01-05, 2014-07-02 renamed	
1191		Avatamsaka Sutra (The Flower Garland Sutra), Zhou Version, the First Tripitaka Koreana Edition, Volume 30 초조본 대방광불화엄경 주본 권30 初雕本 大方廣佛華嚴經 周本 卷三十	Wonju, Gangwon	1994-01-05	
1192		Avatamsaka Sutra (The Flower Garland Sutra), Jin Version, Volume 38 대방광불화엄경 진본 권38 大方廣佛華嚴經 晋本 卷三十八	Wonju, Gangwon	1994-01-05	
1193		Jabi doryang chambeop (Repentance Ritual of the Great Compassion), Revised Version, Volumes 1-5 상교정본자비도량참법 권1~5 詳校正本慈悲道場懺法 卷一~五	Wonju, Gangwon	1994-01-05	
1194		Saddharmapundarika Sutra (The Lotus Sutra), Volume 2 묘법연화경 권2 妙法連華經 卷二	Yangsan, South Gyeongsang	1994-01-05	
1195		Shurangama Sutra (The Sutra of the Heroic One), Volumes 9 and 10 대불정여래밀인수증료의제보살만행수능엄경 권9~10 大佛頂如來密因修證了義諸菩薩萬行首楞嚴經 卷九~十	Yangsan, South Gyeongsang	1994-01-05	
1196		Saddharmapundarika Sutra (The Lotus Sutra) 묘법연화경 妙法連華經	Yangsan, South Gyeongsang	1994-01-05	
1197		Gimyo jehyeon supil (Album of Poems and Essays Compiled by An Cheo-sun) 기묘제현수필 己卯諸賢手筆	Seongnam, Gyeonggi	1994-05-02	
1198		Gimyo jehyeon sucheop (Album of Letters Compiled by An Cheo-sun) 기묘제현수첩 己卯諸賢手帖	Seongnam, Gyeonggi	1994-05-02	
1199		Maehwado (Plum Blossoms) by Yu Suk 유숙필 매화도 劉淑筆 梅花圖	Yongsan District, Seoul	1994-05-02	
1200		Rock-carved Seated Buddha at Dongburam Hermitage Site of Seonunsa Temple, Gochang 고창 선운사 동불암지 마애여래좌상 高敞 禪雲寺 東佛庵址 磨崖如來坐像	Gochang County, North Jeolla	1994-05-02, 2010-08-25 renamed	
1201		Daeungbojeon Hall of Buryeongsa Temple, Uljin 울진 불영사 대웅보전 蔚珍 佛影寺 大雄寶殿	Uljin County, North Gyeongsang	1994-05-02	
1202		Documents of Yi Hyeon-bo’s Family 이현보 종가 문적 李賢輔 宗家 文籍	Andong, North Gyeongsang	1994-07-29	
1203		Documents of O Un’s Family 오운 종가 문적 吳澐 宗家 文籍	Goryeong County, North Gyeongsang	1994-07-29	
1204		Painting of Avalokitesvara Bodhisattva by Buddhist Monk Uigyeom 의겸등필 수월관음도 義謙等筆 水月觀音圖	Yongsan District, Seoul	1994-07-29	
1205		Avatamsaka Sutra (The Flower Garland Sutra), Zhou Version, the First Tripitaka Koreana Edition, Volumes 67 and 77 초조본 대방광불화엄경 주본 권67, 77 初雕本 大方廣佛花嚴經 周本 卷六十七, 七十七	Yeonsu District, Incheon	1994-07-29	
1206		Dasabhumika vibhasa Sastra (Commentary on the Ten Stages Sutra), the First Tripitaka Koreana Edition, Volume 17 초조본 십주비바사론 권17 初雕本 十住毗婆沙論 卷十七	Yeonsu District, Incheon	1994-07-29	
1207		Sangeosayo (Essential Knowledge for Mountain Life) 산거사요 山居四要	Yeonsu District, Incheon	1994-07-29	
1208-1		Chunchugyeong jwassijeon guhae (Zuozhuan with Commentaries), Volumes 60-70 춘추경좌씨전구해 권60~70 春秋經左氏傳句解 卷六十~七十	Yeonsu District, Incheon	1994-07-29	
1209		Ujuduyul (Du Fu's Poems Annotated by Yu Ji) 우주두율 虞註杜律	Yeonsu District, Incheon	1994-07-29	
1210		Buddhist Hanging Painting of Cheongnyangsan Mountain 청량산 괘불탱 淸凉山 掛佛幀	Jongno District, Seoul	1994-10-17	
1211		Commentary on the Prajnaparamita hridaya Sutra (The Heart Sutra) 반야바라밀다심경약소 般若波羅蜜多心經略疏	Dongducheon, Gyeonggi	1994-10-17	
1212		Royal Certificate of Meritorious Subject Issued to Yi Un-ryong and Related Documents 이운룡 선무공신교서 및 관련 고문서 李雲龍 宣武功臣敎書 및 關聯 古文書	Jinju, South Gyeongsang	1994-10-17	
