= List of Treasures of South Korea (2010–2014) =

The Treasures of South Korea designation was established in 1962 and is managed by the Korea Heritage Service. Below is the list of items designated from 2010 to 2014.

On November 19, 2021, the Cultural Heritage Administration removed the numbering system for all of its heritage designations. Previously assigned numbers are preserved here for reference.

== 2010 ==
No.	Image	Official names	Location	Dates	Ref
1078-2		Calligraphy by Han Ho 한호 필적-석봉진적첩 韓濩 筆蹟-石峰眞蹟帖	National Museum of Korea (Yongsan District, Seoul)	2010-01-04	
1631-3		Calligraphy by King Yeongjo 영조어필-읍궁진장첩 英祖御筆-泣弓珍藏帖	Suwon Museum (Suwon, Gyeonggi Province)	2010-01-04	
1632-2		Calligraphy by King Jeongjo 정조어필-제문상정사 正祖御筆-題汶上精舍	National Museum of Korea	2010-01-04	
1636		Stone Seated Sakyamuni Buddha of Buseoksa Temple, Yeongju 영주 부석사 석조석가여래좌상 榮州 浮石寺 石造釋迦如來坐像	Buseoksa (Yeongju, North Gyeongsang Province)	2010-02-24	
1639		Portrait of State Preceptor Jinul in Donghwasa Temple, Daegu 대구 동화사 보조국사지눌진영 大邱 桐華寺 普照國師知訥眞影	Donghwasa (Dong District, Daegu)	2010-02-24	
1640		Hanging Painting of Gimnyongsa Temple, Mungyeong (The Vulture Peak Assembly 문경 김룡사 영산회괘불도 聞慶 金龍 寺 靈山會掛佛圖	Gimnyongsa (Mungyeong, North Gyeongsang Province)	2010-02-24	
1645		Bronze Bell of Gwangheungsa Temple, Andong 안동 광흥사 동종 安東 廣興寺 銅鍾	Central Buddhist Museum (Jongno District, Seoul)	2010-02-24	
1648		Stele for Master Jajeok at Gyeongcheongseonwon of Myeongbongsa Temple, Yecheon 예천 명봉사 경청선원자적선사능운탑비 醴泉 鳴鳳寺 境淸禪院慈寂禪師陵雲塔碑	Myeongbongsa (Yecheon County, North Gyeongsang Province)	2010-02-24	
1649		Wooden Seated Amitabha Buddha and Related Document of Gaeunsa Temple, Seoul 서울 개운사 목조아미타여래좌상 및 발원문 서울 開運寺 木造阿彌陀如來坐像 및 發願文	Gaeunsa (Seongbuk District, Seoul); Central Buddhist Museum	2010-04-23	
1656		Three-story Stone Pagoda at Beopsusa Temple Site, Seongju 성주 법수사지 삼층석탑 星州 法水寺址 三層石塔	Seongju County, North Gyeongsang Province	2010-07-05	
1657		Certificate of Meritorious Subject Issued to Yi Hyeong and Case 이형 좌명원종공신녹권 및 함 李衡佐命原從功臣錄券 및 函	National Palace Museum of Korea (Jongno District, Seoul)	2010-08-25	
1662		Letters of Master Bogak 대혜보각선사서 大慧普覺禪師書	National Palace Museum of Korea	2010-10-25	
1671		Calligraphy by Yun Sun-geo 윤순거 초서 무이구곡가 尹舜擧 草書 武夷九曲歌	National Museum of Korea	2010-10-25	
1675		Calligraphy by Park Tae-yu 박태유 필적 백석유묵첩 朴泰維 筆蹟 白石遺墨帖	Suwon Museum	2010-10-25	
1682		Calligraphy by Yu Han-ji 유한지 예서 기원첩 兪漢芝 隸書 綺園帖	Kyungnam University (Changwon, South Gyeongsang Province	2010-10-25	
1685-1		Calligraphy by Kim Jeong-hui 김정희 해서 묵소거사자찬 金正喜 楷書 黙笑居士自讚	National Museum of Korea	2010-10-25	
1687		Wooden Seated Sakyamuni Buddha Triad of Eungseoksa Temple, Jinju 진주 응석사 목조석가여래삼불좌상 晉州 凝石寺 木造釋迦如來三佛坐像	Eungseoksa (Jinju, South Gyeongsang Province)	2010-12-21	
1688		Wooden Seated Sakyamuni Buddha Triad of Cheonggoksa Temple, Jinju 진주 청곡사 목조석가여래삼존좌상 晉州 靑谷寺 木造釋迦如來三尊坐像	Cheonggoksa (Jinju, South Gyeongsang Province)	2010-12-21	
1689		Wooden Ksitigarbha Bodhisattva Triad and Ten Underworld Kings of Cheonggoksa Temple, Jinju 진주 청곡사 목조지장보살삼존상 및 시왕상 일괄 晉州靑谷寺木造地藏菩薩三尊像및 十王像一括	Cheonggoksa	2010-12-21	
1701		Bronze Bell of Ssanggyesa Temple, Hadong 하동 쌍계사 동종 河東 雙磎寺 銅鍾	Ssanggyesa (Hadong County, South Gyeongsang Province)	2010-12-21	

== 2011 ==
No.	Image	Official names	Location	Dates	Ref
1709		Banghwasuryujeong Pavilion, Suwon 수원 방화수류정 水原 訪花隨柳亭	Suwon	2011-03-03	
1710		Northwestern Watchtower of Hwaseong Fortress, Suwon 수원 서북공심돈 水原 西北空心墩	Suwon	2011-03-03	
1716		Revised Zhenghe Edition of Classified and Practical Basic Materia Medica Based on Historical Classics, Volume 17 중수정화경사증류비용본초 권17 重修政和經史證類備用本草 卷十七	Gachon Museum (Yeonsu District, Incheon)	2011-06-21	
1718		Clay Sakyamuni Buddha Triad and Excavated Relics of Dongguksa Temple, Gunsan 군산 동국사 소조석가여래삼존상 및 복장유물 群山 東國寺 塑造釋迦如來三尊像 및 腹藏遺物	Dongguksa (Gunsan, North Jeolla Province)	2011-09-05	
1721		Wooden Seated Amitabha Buddha Triad of Sinheungsa Temple, Sokcho 속초 신흥사 목조아미타여래삼존좌상 束草 神興寺 木造阿彌陀如來三尊坐像	Sinheungsa (Sokcho, Gangwon Province	2011-09-05	
1722		Gathering of Officials of the Inspector-general 총마계회도 驄馬契會圖	Miryang Park clan (Hwasun County, South Jeolla Province)	2011-09-05	
1723		Stupa, Stele, and Reliquaries of Naksansa Temple, Yangyang 양양 낙산사 해수관음공중사리탑·비 및 사리장엄구 일괄 襄陽 洛山寺 海水觀音空中舍利塔·碑 및 舍利莊嚴具 一括	Naksansa (Yangyang County, Gangwon Province)	2011-11-01	
1727		Daeseongjeon Shrine of Gyeongjuhyanggyo Local Confucian School 경주향교 대성전 慶州鄕校 大成殿	Gyeongju, North Gyeongsang Province	2011-12-02	
1728		Portrait of Heo Jeon 허전 초상 許傳 肖像	Gyeonggi Province Museum (Yongin, Gyeonggi Province)	2011-12-23	
1731		Buddhist Painting of Beobinsa Temple, Hamyang 함양 법인사 감로왕도 咸陽 法印寺 甘露王圖	Beobinsa (Hamyang County, South Gyeongsang Province)	2011-12-23	
1738		Salgoji Bridge, Seoul 서울 살곶이 다리 서울 箭串橋	Seongdong District, Seoul	2011-12-23	
1739		Stone Ice Storage in Yeongsan, Changnyeong 창녕 영산 석빙고 昌寧 靈山 石氷庫	Changnyeong County, South Gyeongsang Province	2011-12-23	
1740		Gwancheondae Obervatory of Gwansanggam, Seoul 서울 관상감 관천대 서울 觀象監 觀天臺	Jongno District	2011-12-23	
1741		T-shaped Wooden Shrine at Geonwolleung Royal Tomb, Guri 구리 동구릉 건원릉 정자각 九里 東九陵 健元陵 丁字閣	Donggureung (Guri, Gyeonggi Province)	2011-12-26	
1742		T-shaped Wooden Shrine at Sungneung Royal Tomb, Guri 구리 동구릉 숭릉 정자각 九里 東九陵 崇陵 丁字閣	Donggureung	2011-12-26	
1743		T-shaped Wooden Shrine at Mongneung Royal Tomb, Guri 구리 동구릉 목릉 정자각 九里 東九陵 穆陵 丁字閣	Donggureung	2011-12-26	
1744		Daeungjeon Hall of Bulguksa Temple, Gyeongju 경주 불국사 대웅전 慶州 佛國寺 大雄殿	Bulguksa (Gyeongju, North Gyeongsang Province)	2011-12-30	
1745		Stone Elevation of Bulguksa Temple, Gyeongju 경주 불국사 가구식 석축 慶州 佛國寺 架構式 石築	Bulguksa	2011-12-30	
1746		Lecture Hall of Nogangseowon Confucian Academy, Nonsan 논산 노강서원 강당 論山 魯岡書院 講堂	Nogang Seowon (Nonsan, South Chungcheong Province)	2011-12-30	

== 2012 ==
No.	Image	Official names	Location	Dates	Ref
~~1758~~		~~Silla Monument in Jungseong-ri, Pohang~~ ~~포항 중성리 신라비~~; ~~浦項 中城里 新羅碑~~	~~Gyeongju National Research Institute of Cultural Heritage (Gyeongju, North Gyeongsang Province)~~	2012-02-22; Promoted to National Treasure No. 318 on 2015-04-22	
1759		Sajeongjeon Hall of Gyeongbokgung Palace 경복궁 사정전 景福宮 思政殿	Gyeongbokgung (Jongno District, Seoul)	2012-03-02	
1760		Sujeongjeon Hall of Gyeongbokgung Palace 경복궁 수정전 景福宮 修政殿	Gyeongbokgung	2012-03-02	
1761		Hyangwonjeong Pavilion of Gyeongbokgung Palace 경복궁 향원정 景福宮 香遠亭	Gyeongbokgung	2012-03-02	
1762호		Geumcheongyo Bridge of Changdeokgung Palace 창덕궁 금천교 昌德宮 錦川橋	Changdeokgung (Jongno District, Seoul)	2012-03-02	
1763		Buyongjeong Pavilion of Changdeokgung Palace 창덕궁 부용정 昌德宮 芙蓉亭	Changdeokgung	2012-03-02	
1764		Nakseonjae Hall of Changdeokgung Palace 창덕궁 낙선재 昌德宮 樂善齋	Changdeokgung	2012-03-02	
1765		Buddhist Paintings of Gaesimsa Temple, Seosan 서산 개심사 오방오제위도 및 사직사자도 瑞山 開心寺 五方五帝位圖 및 四直使者圖	Gaesimsa (Seosan, South Chuncheong Province)	2012-04-25	
1769		Juhamnu Pavilion of Changdeokgung Palace 창덕궁 주합루 昌德宮 宙合樓	Changdeokgung	2012-08-16	
1770		Yeongyeongdang Hall of Changdeokgung Palace 창덕궁 연경당 昌德宮 演慶堂	Changdeokgung	2012-08-16	
1771		Daeungjeon Hall of Jangansa Temple, Gijang 기장 장안사 대웅전 機張 長安寺 大雄殿	Jangansa (Gijang County, Busan)	2012-08-06	
1780		Excavated Documents from the Wooden Seated Vairocana Buddha in Daejeokgwangjeon Hall of Haeinsa Temple, Hapcheon 합천 해인사 대적광전 목조비로자나불좌상 복장전적 陜川 海印寺 大寂光殿 木造毘盧遮那佛坐像 腹藏典籍	Haeinsa (Hapcheon County, South Gyeongsang Province)	2012-10-30	
1785		Wooden Seated Sakyamuni Buddha Triad of Jeondeungsa Temple, Ganghwa 강화 전등사 목조석가여래삼불좌상 江華 傳燈寺 木造釋迦如來三佛坐像	Jeondeungsa (Ganghwa County, Incheon)	2012-12-27	
1788		Artifacts Excavated from the Octagonal Five-story Stone Pagoda of Sujongsa Temple, Namyangju 남양주 수종사 팔각오층석탑 출토유물 일괄 南楊州 水鍾寺 八角五層石塔 出土遺物 一括	Central Buddhist Museum	2012-12-27	
1790		Gilt-bronze Seated Avalokitesvara Bodhisattva of Yongmunsa Temple, Yangpyeong 양평 용문사 금동관음보살좌상 楊平 龍門寺 金銅觀音菩薩坐像	Yongmunsa (Yangpyeong County, Gyeonggi Province)	2012-12-27	
1791		Wooden Seated Amitabha Buddha Triad of Silleuksa Temple, Yeoju 여주 신륵사 목조아미타여래삼존상 驪州 神勒寺 木造阿彌陀如來三尊像	Silleuksa (Yeoju, Gyeonggi Province)	2012-12-27	
1793		Bronze Bell of Hyeondeungsa Temple, Gapyeong 가평 현등사 동종 加平 懸燈寺 銅鍾	Hyeondeungsa (Gapyeong County, Gyeonggi Province)	2012-12-27	
