= List of Treasures of South Korea (1995–1999) =

The Treasures of South Korea designation was established in 1962 and is managed by the Korea Heritage Service (KHS; formerly "Cultural Heritage Administration"). This designation is distinct from the National Treasure designation. Covered here are items designated in the years 1995 through 1999.

== List ==
No. (Note: On November 19, 2021, the Cultural Heritage Administration removed the numbering system for all of its designations, including Treasure. Previously assigned numbers are preserved here for the sake of reference.)	Image	Official names (Note: (English, Hangul, Hanja/mixed script))	Location	Dates	Refs
1213		Stone Seated Vairocana Buddha of Cheonhwangsa Temple, Miryang 밀양 천황사 석조비로자나불좌상 密陽 天皇寺 石造毘盧遮那佛坐像	Sacheon, South Gyeongsang	1995-01-10, 2010-08-25 renamed	
1214		Buddhist Painting of Pagyesa Temple (The Vulture Peak Assembly) 파계사영산회상도 把溪寺靈山會上圖	Dong District, Daegu	1995-01-10	
1215-1		Portraits of Yi Saek 이색초상-목은영당본 李穡肖像-牧隱影堂本	Jongno District, Seoul	1995-03-14	
1215-2		Portraits of Yi Saek 이색초상-영모영당본 李穡肖像-永慕影堂本	Buyeo County, South Chungcheong	1995-03-14	
1215-3		Portraits of Yi Saek 이색초상-누산영당본 李穡肖像-樓山影堂本	Yesan County, South Chungcheong	1995-12-11	
1215-4		Portraits of Yi Saek 이색초상-대전영당본 李穡肖像-大田影堂本	Yuseong District, Daejeon	1995-12-11	
1216		Portraits of Yi Saek (Portrait of Son So) 손소초상 孫昭 肖像	Seongnam, Gyeonggi	1995-03-10	
1217		Sinpyeon sanhak gyemong (Introduction to Arithmetic), Volume 2 of 3 신편산학계몽 권중 新編算學啓蒙 卷中	Seodaemun District, Seoul	1995-04-03	
1218		Dunchon jabyeong (Collected Works of Yi Jip) 둔촌잡영 遁村雜詠	Seodaemun District, Seoul	1995-04-03	
1219-1		Mahavaipulya purnabudha Sutra (The Complete Enlightenment Sutra), Part 1-2 of Volume 1 and Part 1-1 to 2-2 of Volume 2 대방광원각수다라료의경 권상1의2,하1의1~2의2 大方廣圓覺修多羅了義經 卷上一之二,下一之一~二之二	Seodaemun District, Seoul	1995-04-03	
1220		Relics Related to Princess Myeongan 명안공주관련유물 明安公主關聯遺物	Gangneung, Gangwon	1995-06-23	
1221		Portrait of Kim Jin 김진초상 金璡 肖像	Andong, North Gyeongsang	1995-07-19	
1222-1		Beopjip byeolhaengnok jeoryo byeongipsagi (Excerpts from the Dharma Collection and Special Practice Records with Personal Notes) 법집별행록절요병입사기 法集別行錄節要幷入私記	Wonju, Gangwon	1995-07-19, 2013-11-13 renumbered	
1223		Annotated Vajracchedika prajnaparamita Sutra (The Diamond Sutra), Volume 2 집주금강반야바라밀경 권하 集註金剛般若波羅蜜經 卷下	Wonju, Gangwon	1995-07-19	
1224		Buljo samgyeong (The Three Sutras) 불조삼경 佛祖三經	Wonju, Gangwon	1995-07-19	
1225		Saddharmapundarika Sutra (The Lotus Sutra), Korean Translation, Volume 7 묘법연화경 권7(언해) 妙法蓮華經 卷七(諺解)	Gimpo, Gyeonggi	1995-07-19	
1226		Royal Edict of Appointment Issued to Jo Heup 조흡 고신왕지 曺恰 告身王旨	Nowon District, Seoul	1995-07-19	
1227		Singmul boncho (Pharmacopeia) 식물본초 食物本草	Yeonsu District, Incheon	1995-07-19	
1228		Celadon Ewer with Incised Dragon Design 청자 음각용문 주전자 靑磁 陰刻龍文 注子	Yongsan District, Seoul	1995-12-04	
1229		Buncheong Flat Bottle with Incised Lotus Design 분청사기 음각연화문 편병 粉靑沙器 陰刻蓮花文 扁甁	Yongsan District, Seoul	1995-12-04	
1230		White Porcelain Bottle with Inlaid Lotus and Scroll Design 백자 상감연화당초문 병 白磁 象嵌蓮花唐草文 甁	Yongin, Gyeonggi	1995-12-04	
1231		White Porcelain Jar with Cloud and Bamboo Design in Underglaze Iron 백자 철화운죽문 항아리 白磁 鐵畵雲竹文 壺	Yongsan District, Seoul	1995-12-04	
1232		Wooden Seated Indra and Brahma of Cheonggoksa Temple, Jinju 진주청곡사목조제석천·대범천의상 晋州靑谷寺木造帝釋天·大梵天倚像	Hapcheon County, South Gyeongsang	1995-12-04	
1233		Hyeonja Chongtong Gun 현자총통 玄字銃筒	Jinju, South Gyeongsang	1995-12-04	
1234		Uibang yuchwi (Classified Collection of Medical Prescriptions), Volume 201 의방유취 권201 醫方類聚 卷二百一	Eumseong County, North Chungcheong	1996-01-19	
1235		Hyangyak jesaeng jipseongbang (Collection of Native Prescriptions for Saving Lives), Volumes 4 and 5 향약제생집성방 권4~5 鄕藥濟生集成方 卷四~五	Eumseong County, North Chungcheong	1996-01-19	
1236-1		Gugeup ganibang (Prescriptions for Emergency Treatment), Volume 6 구급간이방 권6 救急簡易方 卷六	Eumseong County, North Chungcheong	1996-01-19	
1236-2		Gugeup ganibang (Prescriptions for Emergency Treatment), Volume 6 구급간이방 권6 救急簡易方 卷六	Gangseo District, Seoul	2006-01-17	
1237		Documents of the Samujeong Branch of the Milseong Bak Clan 밀성박씨 삼우정파 종중 고문서 密城朴氏 三友亭派 宗中 古文書	Suseong District, Daegu	1996-01-19	
1238		Painting of Amitabha Buddha 아미타여래도 阿彌陀如來圖	Yongin, Gyeonggi	1996-04-04	
1239		Painting of Buddha Giving a Sermon 감로탱화 甘露幀畵	Yongin, Gyeonggi	1996-04-04	
1240		Saddharmapundarika Sutra (The Lotus Sutra), Volumes 3 and 4 묘법연화경 권3~4 妙法蓮華經 卷三~四	Yangsan, South Gyeongsang	1996-04-04	
1241		Yenyeom mita doryang chambeop (Contrition in the Name of Amitabha Buddha), Volumes 6-10 예념미타도량참법 권6~10 禮念彌陀道場懺法 卷六~十	Gimcheon, North Gyeongsang	1996-04-04	
1242		Gilsangtap Pagoda of Haeinsa Temple, Hapcheon 합천 해인사 길상탑 陜川 海印寺 吉祥塔	Hapcheon County, South Gyeongsang	1996-05-29, 2010-12-27 renamed	
1243		Daeungjeon Hall of Songgwangsa Temple, Wanju 완주 송광사 대웅전 完州 松廣寺 大雄殿	Wanju County, North Jeolla	1996-05-29	
1244		Bell Tower of Songgwangsa Temple, Wanju 완주 송광사 종루 完州 松廣寺 鍾樓	Wanju County, North Jeolla	1996-05-29	
1245		Baekbeom ilji (Diary of Kim Gu), Volumes 1 (1929) and 2 (1943) 백범일지1929년(상권)1943년(하권) 白凡逸志一九二九年(上卷)一九四三年(下卷)	Yongsan District, Seoul	1997-06-12	
1246		Royal Edict of Labor Exemption Issued to Gwangdeoksa Temple, Cheonan 천안 광덕사 감역교지 天安 廣德寺 減役敎旨	Cheonan, South Chungcheong	1997-06-12	
1247		Joseon Transcription of Buddhist Sutras in Gwangdeoksa Temple, Cheonan 천안 광덕사 조선사경 天安 廣德寺 朝鮮寫經	Cheonan, South Chungcheong	1997-06-12	
1247-1		천안 광덕사 조선사경-백지묵서부모은중경 및 불설장수감죄제동자다라니경 天安 廣德寺 朝鮮寫經-白紙墨書父母恩重經 및 佛說長壽減罪諸重子陀羅尼經	Cheonan, South Chungcheong	1997-06-12	
1247-2		천안 광덕사 조선사경-백지묵서묘법연화경 권1, 3, 5, 6 ,7 天安 廣德寺 朝鮮寫經-白紙墨書 妙法蓮華經卷一, 三, 五, 六, 七	Cheonan, South Chungcheong	1997-06-12	
1247-3		천안 광덕사 조선사경-백지묵서불설장수멸죄제동자다라니경 및 대승기신론 天安 廣德寺 朝鮮寫經-白紙墨書佛說長壽滅罪諸童子陀羅尼經 및 大乘起信論	Cheonan, South Chungcheong	1997-06-12	
1248		Shurangama Sutra (The Sutra of the Heroic One), Volumes 1-4 대불정여래밀인수증료의보살만행수능엄경 권1~4 大佛頂如來密因修證了義諸菩薩萬行首楞嚴經 卷一~四	Gwanak District, Seoul	1997-06-12	
1249		Gani byeogonbang (Simple Prescriptions to Prevent Epidemics), Korean Translation 간이벽온방(언해) 簡易辟瘟方(諺解)	Yeonsu District, Incheon	1997-06-12	
1250		Seui deukhyobang (Efficacious Remedies of the Physicians), Volumes 10 and 11 세의득효방 권10~11 世醫得效方 卷十~十一	Yeonsu District, Incheon	1997-06-12	
~~1251~~		~~금강반야바라밀경~~; ~~金剛般若波羅蜜經<卷第一>~~	~~Jangheung County, South Jeolla~~	1997-06-12, 2002-08-05 removed and made Treasure No. 773-3	
1252		Jabi doryang chambeop (Repentance Ritual of the Great Compassion), Revised Version, Volumes 9 and 10 상교정본자비도량참법 권9~10 詳校正本慈悲道場懺法 卷九~十	Jangheung County, South Jeolla	1997-06-12	
1253		Bronze Bell of Haeinsa Temple 해인사 동종 海印寺 銅鍾	Hapcheon County, South Gyeongsang	1997-06-12	
1254		Wooden Four Guardian Kings of Borimsa Temple, Jangheung 장흥 보림사 목조사천왕상 長興 寶林寺 木造四天王像	Jangheung County, South Jeolla	1997-06-12	
1255		Clay Four Guardian Kings of Songgwangsa Temple, Wanju 완주 송광사 소조사천왕상 完州 松廣寺 塑造四天王像	Wanju County, North Jeolla	1997-06-12	
1256		Hanging Painting of Chiljangsa Temple (Buddha Triad) 칠장사삼불회괘불탱 七長寺三佛會掛佛幀	Anseong, Gyeonggi	1997-08-08	
1257		Hanging Painting of Cheongnyongsa Temple (The Vulture Peak Assembly) 청룡사영산회괘불탱 靑龍寺靈山會掛佛幀	Anseong, Gyeonggi	1997-08-08	
1258		Hanging Painting of Bosalsa Temple (The Vulture Peak Assembly) 보살사영산회괘불탱 菩薩寺靈山會掛佛幀	Cheongju, North Chungcheong	1997-08-08	
1259		Hanging Painting of Beopjusa Temple 법주사괘불탱 法住寺掛佛幀	Boeun County, North Chungcheong	1997-08-08	
1260		Hanging Painting of Magoksa Temple (Sakyamuni Buddha) 마곡사석가모니불괘불탱 麻谷寺釋迦牟尼佛掛佛幀	Gongju, South Chungcheong	1997-08-08	
1261		Hanging Painting of Gwangdeoksa Temple (Rocana Buddha) 광덕사노사나불괘불탱 廣德寺蘆舍那佛掛佛幀	Cheonan, South Chungcheong	1997-08-08	
1262		Hanging Painting of Yongbongsa Temple (The Vulture Peak Assembly) 용봉사영산회괘불탱 龍鳳寺靈山會掛佛幀	Hongseong County, South Chungcheong	1997-08-08	
1263		Hanging Painting of Sudeoksa Temple (Rocana Buddha) 수덕사노사나불괘불탱 修德寺蘆舍那佛掛佛幀	Yesan County, South Chungcheong	1997-08-08	
1264		Hanging Painting of Gaesimsa Temple (The Vulture Peak Assembly) 개심사영산회괘불탱 開心寺靈山會掛佛幀	Seosan, South Chungcheong	1997-08-08	
1265		Hanging Painting of Muryangsa Temple (Maitreya Buddha) 무량사미륵불괘불탱 無量寺彌勒佛掛佛幀	Buyeo County, South Chungcheong	1997-08-08	
1266		Hanging Painting of Geumdangsa Temple 금당사괘불탱 金塘寺掛佛幀	Jinan County, North Jeolla	1997-08-08	
1267		Hanging Painting of Anguksa Temple (The Vulture Peak Assembly) 안국사영산회괘불탱 安國寺靈山會掛佛幀	Muju County, North Jeolla	1997-08-08	
1268		Hanging Painting of Naesosa Temple (The Vulture Peak Assembly) 내소사영산회괘불탱 來蘇寺靈山會掛佛幀	Buan County, North Jeolla	1997-08-08	
1269		Hanging Painting and the Sketch of Gaeamsa Temple (The Vulture Peak Assembly) 개암사영산회괘불탱및초본 開巖寺靈山會掛佛幀및草本	Buan County, North Jeolla	1997-08-08	
1270		Hanging Painting of Eunhaesa Temple 은해사괘불탱 銀海寺掛佛幀	Yeongcheon, North Gyeongsang	1997-08-08	
1271		Hanging Painting of Sudosa Temple (Rocana Buddha) 수도사노사나불괘불탱 修道寺蘆舍那佛掛佛幀	Yeongcheon, North Gyeongsang	1997-08-08	
1272		Buddhist Painting of Buryeongsa Temple (The Vulture Peak Assembly) 불영사영산회상도 佛影寺靈山會上圖	Uljin County, North Gyeongsang	1997-08-08	
1273		Buddhist Painting of Haeinsa Temple (The Vulture Peak Assembly) 해인사영산회상도 海印寺靈山會上圖	Hapcheon County, South Gyeongsang	1997-08-08	
1274		Clay Seated Sakyamuni Buddha Triad and Excavated Relics of Songgwangsa Temple, Wanju 완주 송광사 소조석가여래삼불좌상 및 복장유물 完州 松廣寺 塑造釋迦如來三佛坐像 및 腹藏遺物	Wanju County, North Jeolla	1997-08-08	
1275		South Three-story Stone Pagoda at Hangyesa Temple Site, Inje 인제 한계사지 남 삼층석탑 麟蹄 寒溪寺址 南 三層石塔	Inje County, Gangwon	1998-04-06, 2010-12-27 renamed	
1276		North Three-story Stone Pagoda at Hangyesa Temple Site, Inje 인제 한계사지 북 삼층석탑 麟蹄 寒溪寺址 北 三層石塔	Inje County, Gangwon	1998-04-06, 2010-12-27 renamed	
1277		Three-story Stone Pagoda of Samhwasa Temple, Donghae 동해 삼화사 삼층석탑 東海 三和寺 三層石塔	Donghae, Gangwon	1998-04-06, 2010-12-27 renamed	
1278		Hanging Painting of Bukjangsa Temple (The Vulture Peak Assembly) 북장사영산회괘불탱 北長寺靈山會掛佛幀	Sangju, North Gyeongsang	1998-06-29	
1279		Hanging Painting of Jungnimsa Temple (Sakyamuni Buddha) 죽림사세존괘불탱 竹林寺世尊掛佛幀	Naju, South Jeolla	1998-06-29	
1280		Bronze Bell of Oeosa Temple, Pohang 포항 오어사 동종 浦項 吾魚寺 銅鍾	Pohang, North Gyeongsang	1998-06-29	
1281-1		Jachi tonggam (Comprehensive Mirror for Aid in Government), Volumes 236-238 자치통감 권236~238 資治通鑑 卷二百三十六~二百三十八	Yongsan District, Seoul	1998-06-29	
1282		Certificate of Meritorious Subject Issued to Choe Yu-ryeon 최유련개국원종공신록권 崔有漣開國原從功臣錄券	Seongdong District, Seoul	1998-06-29	
1283		Three-story Stone Pagoda at Yongamsa Temple Site in Wolchulsan Mountain, Yeongam 영암 월출산 용암사지 삼층석탑 靈巖 月出山 龍巖寺址 三層石塔	Yeongam County, South Jeolla	1998-08-08, 2010-12-27 renamed	
1284		Five-story Stone Pagoda at Cheongnyangsa Temple Site, Gongju 공주 청량사지 오층석탑 公州 淸凉寺址 五層石塔	Gongju, South Chungcheong	1998-09-15, 2010-12-27 renamed	
1285		Seven-story Stone Pagoda at Cheongnyangsa Temple Site, Gongju 공주 청량사지 칠층석탑 公州 淸凉寺址 七層石塔	Gongju, South Chungcheong	1998-09-15	
1286		Painting of Avalokitesvara Bodhisattva 수월관음도 水月觀音圖	Yongin, Gyeonggi	1998-10-10	
1287		Painting of Ksitigarbha Bodhisattva Triad 지장보살삼존도 地藏菩薩三尊圖	Jongno District, Seoul	1998-10-10	
1288		Tarubi Monument, Yeosu 여수 타루비 麗水 墮淚碑	Yeosu, South Jeolla	1998-12-04	
1289		Royal Confidential Order Issued to Yi Yun-son 이윤손 유서 李允孫 諭書	Jungnang District, Seoul	1998-12-18, 2010-12-27 renamed	
1290		Jinsan sego (Collected Works of the Three Generations of Jinsan) 진산세고 晉山世稿	Gangseo District, Seoul	1998-12-18	
1291		Daeak hubo (Later Edition of Scores of the Great Music) 대악후보 大樂後譜	Seocho District, Seoul	1998-12-18	
1292		Iron Seated Rocana Buddha of Samhwasa Temple, Donghae 동해 삼화사 철조노사나불좌상 東海 三和寺 鐵造盧舍那佛坐像	Donghae, Gangwon	1998-12-18	
569-24		Calligraphy by An Jung-geun 안중근의사유묵-천여불수반수기앙이 安重根義士遺墨 - 天與不受反受其殃耳	Jeju City, Jeju	1999-12-15	
1293		Jungakdan Shrine in Gyeryongsan Mountain, Gongju 공주 계룡산 중악단 公州 鷄龍山 中嶽壇	Gongju, South Chungcheong	1999-03-02	
~~1294~~		~~Royal Certificate of Meritorious Subject Issued to Yi Je~~; ~~이제개국공신교서~~; ~~李濟開國功臣敎書~~	~~Sancheong County, South Gyeongsang~~	1999-06-19, 2018-06-27 removed, made National Treasure No. 324	
1295		Stele for Buddhist Monk Tongil at Gagyeonsa Temple, Goesan 괴산 각연사 통일대사탑비 槐山 覺淵寺 通一大師塔碑	Goesan County, North Chungcheong	1999-06-23, 2010-12-27 renamed	
1296		Three-story Stone Pagoda of Silleuksa Temple, Jecheon 제천 신륵사 삼층석탑 堤川 神勒寺 三層石塔	Jecheon, North Chungcheong	1999-06-23, 2010-12-27 renamed	
1297		Seonjong yeonggajip (Essence of Zen Buddhism) 선종영가집 禪宗永嘉集	Jongno District, Seoul	1999-12-15	
1298		Portrait of Jo Yeong-bok 조영복초상 趙榮福 肖像	Yongin, Gyeonggi	1999-12-15	
