= List of Treasures of South Korea (1975–1979) =

The Treasures of South Korea designation was established in 1962 and is managed by the Korea Heritage Service (KHS; formerly "Cultural Heritage Administration"). This designation is distinct from the National Treasure designation. Covered here are items designated in the years 1975 through 1979.

== List ==
No. (Note: On November 19, 2021, the Cultural Heritage Administration removed the numbering system for all of its designations, including Treasure. Previously assigned numbers are preserved here for the sake of reference.)	Image	Official names (Note: (English, Hangul, Hanja/mixed script))	Location	Dates	Refs
583		Pungpaejigwan Guesthouse, Jeonju 전주 풍패지관 全州 豊沛之館	Jeonju, North Jeolla	1975-03-31	
584		Stele for Yun Munhyogong, Gurye 구례 윤문효공 신도비 求禮 尹文孝公 神道碑	Gurye County, South Jeolla	1975-03-31, 2010-12-27 renamed	
585		Manuscript of Yi Hwang and Song Si-yeol 퇴우이선생진적 退尤二先生眞蹟	Yongsan District, Seoul	1975-05-01	
586-1		Manuscripts of Yi Eon-jeok 이언적 수고본 일괄-속대학혹문 李彦迪 手稿本 一括-續大學或問	Gyeongju, North Gyeongsang	1975-05-01	
586-2		Manuscripts of Yi Eon-jeok 이언적 수고본 일괄-대학장구보유 李彦迪 手稿本 一括-大學章句補遺	Gyeongju, North Gyeongsang	1975-05-01	
586-3		Manuscripts of Yi Eon-jeok 이언적 수고본 일괄-중용구경연의 李彦迪 手稿本 一括-中庸九經衍義	Gyeongju, North Gyeongsang	1975-05-01	
586-4		Manuscripts of Yi Eon-jeok 이언적 수고본 일괄-진수팔규 李彦迪 手稿本 一括-進修八規	Gyeongju, North Gyeongsang	1975-05-01	
586-5		Manuscripts of Yi Eon-jeok 이언적 수고본 일괄-봉선잡의 李彦迪 手稿本 一括-奉先雜儀	Gyeongju, North Gyeongsang	1975-05-01	
587		Documents of Piramseowon Confucian Academy 필암서원 문적 일괄 筆巖書院 文籍 一括	Buk District, Gwangju	1975-05-01	
587-1		필암서원 문적 일괄-노비보 筆巖書院 文籍 一括-奴婢譜	Buk District, Gwangju	1975-05-01	
587-2		필암서원 문적 일괄-원장선생안 筆巖書院 文籍 一括-院長先生案	Buk District, Gwangju	1975-05-01	
587-3		필암서원 문적 일괄-필암서원집강안 筆巖書院 文籍 一括-筆巖書院執綱案	Buk District, Gwangju	1975-05-01	
587-4		필암서원 문적 일괄-문계안 筆巖書院 文籍 一括-文契案	Buk District, Gwangju	1975-05-01	
587-5		필암서원 문적 일괄-문계안 筆巖書院 文籍 一括-文契案	Buk District, Gwangju	1975-05-01	
587-6		필암서원 문적 일괄-필암서원서재유안서 筆巖書院 文籍 一括-筆巖書院西齋儒案書	Buk District, Gwangju	1975-05-01	
587-7		필암서원 문적 일괄-필암서원원적 筆巖書院 文籍 一括-筆巖書院院籍	Buk District, Gwangju	1975-05-01	
587-8		필암서원 문적 일괄-필암서원원적 筆巖書院 文籍 一括-筆巖書院院籍	Buk District, Gwangju	1975-05-01	
587-9		필암서원 문적 일괄-필암서원원적 筆巖書院 文籍 一括-筆巖書院院籍	Buk District, Gwangju	1975-05-01	
587-10		필암서원 문적 일괄-필암서원원적 筆巖書院 文籍 一括-筆巖書院院籍	Buk District, Gwangju	1975-05-01	
587-11		필암서원 문적 일괄-장성필암서원성책 筆巖書院 文籍 一括-長城筆巖書院成冊	Buk District, Gwangju	1975-05-01	
587-12		필암서원 문적 일괄-노비안 筆巖書院 文籍 一括-奴婢案	Buk District, Gwangju	1975-05-01	
587-13		필암서원 문적 일괄-봉심록 筆巖書院 文籍 一括-奉審錄	Buk District, Gwangju	1975-05-01	
587-14		필암서원 문적 일괄-양자징명축관계품목 筆巖書院 文籍 一括-梁子澂名祝關係稟目	Buk District, Gwangju	1975-05-01	
588		Portrait of Kang Min-cheom 강민첨초상 姜民瞻 肖像	Yongsan District, Seoul	1975-05-16	
589		Portrait of Kang Hyeon 강현초상 姜鋧肖像	Yongsan District, Seoul	1975-05-16	
590		Portrait of Kang Se-hwang 강세황초상 姜世晃 肖像	Yongsan District, Seoul	1975-05-16	
590-1		강세황초상 - 강세황자필본 姜世晃 肖像 - 姜世晃自筆本	Yongsan District, Seoul	1975-05-16	
590-2		강세황초상 - 이명기필본 姜世晃 肖像 - 李命基筆本	Yongsan District, Seoul	1975-05-16	
591		Printing Woodblocks of Seokssi wollyu eunghwa sajeok (Life and Activities of Sakyamuni Buddha Incarnate) 석씨원류응화사적목판 釋氏源流應化事蹟木板	Jongno District, Seoul	1975-05-16	
592-1		Manuscript of Heo Mok 허목수고본 許穆手稿本	Yongsan District, Seoul	1975-05-16	
593		Album of Buddhist Paintings by Yi Sang-jwa 이상좌불화첩 李上佐佛畵帖	Yongsan District, Seoul	1975-05-16	
594		Portrait of Choe Deok-ji and Sketch on Oil Paper 최덕지 초상 및 유지초본 崔德之肖像 및 油紙草本	Yeongam County, South Jeolla	1975-05-16	
595		Folding Screen of Embroidered Chochungdo (Grass and Insects) 자수 초충도 병풍 刺繡 草蟲圖 屛風	Seo District, Busan	1975-05-16	
~~596~~		~~궁궐도~~; ~~宮闕圖~~	~~Seo District, Busan~~	1975-05-16, 1995-06-23 removed, made National Treasure No. 249	
597		Earthenware Bowl with Raised Pattern 토기 융기문 발 土器 隆起文 鉢	Seo District, Busan	1975-05-16	
598		Earthenware Horn Cups with Horse Head Decoration 도기 말머리장식 뿔잔 陶器 馬頭飾 角杯	Seo District, Busan	1975-05-16	
599		Ssangja Chongtong Gun 쌍자총통 雙字銃筒	Seo District, Busan	1975-08-04	
600		Stone Seated Buddha at Yaksaam Hermitage, Gwangju 광주 약사암 석조여래좌상 光州 藥師庵 石造如來坐像	Dong District, Gwangju	1975-08-04	
601		Stupa in Dohak-dong, Daegu 대구 도학동 승탑 大邱 道鶴洞 僧塔	Dong District, Daegu	1975-08-04, 2010-12-27 renamed	
602		Manuscript of Gyeongmong yogyeol (The Secret of Expelling Ignorance) by Yi I 이이 수고본 격몽요결 李珥 手稿本 擊蒙要訣	Gangneung, Gangwon	1976-04-23	
603		Munmujapgwa bangmok (Roster of Successful State Examination Candidates) 문무잡과방목 文武雜科榜目	Gangneung, Gangwon	1976-04-23	
604		Royal Certificate of Meritorious Subject Issued to Jang Mal-son 장말손 적개공신교서 張末孫 敵愾功臣敎書	Yeongju, North Gyeongsang	1976-04-23	
605		Petroglyphs of Janggi-ri, Goryeong 고령 장기리 암각화 高靈 場基里 岩刻畫	Goryeong County, North Gyeongsang	1976-08-06, 2010-12-27 renamed	
606		East and West Three-story Stone Pagodas from Docheonsa Temple Site, Mungyeong 문경 도천사지 동·서 삼층석탑 聞慶 道川寺址 東·西 三層石塔	Gimcheon, North Gyeongsang	1976-11-30, 2010-12-27 renamed	
607		Three-story Stone Pagoda from Docheonsa Temple Site, Mungyeong 문경 도천사지 삼층석탑 聞慶 道川寺址 三層石塔	Gimcheon, North Gyeongsang	1976-11-30, 2010-12-27 renamed	
608		Bogwangmyeongjeon Hall of Wibongsa Temple, Wanju 완주 위봉사 보광명전 完州 威鳳寺 普光明殿	Wanju County, North Jeolla	1977-08-22	
609		Three-story Stone Pagoda in Hwacheon-ri, Yeongyang 영양 화천리 삼층석탑 英陽 化川里 三層石塔	Yeongyang County, North Gyeongsang	1977-08-22, 2010-12-27 renamed	
610		Three-story Stone Pagoda in Hyeon-ri, Yeongyang 영양 현리 삼층석탑 英陽 縣里 三層石塔	Yeongyang County, North Gyeongsang	1977-08-22, 2010-12-27 renamed	
611		Stele for State Preceptor Wonjeung at Taegosa Temple, Goyang 고양 태고사 원증국사탑비 高陽 太古寺 圓證國師塔碑	Goyang, Gyeonggi	1977-08-22, 2010-12-27 renamed	
612		Stele for Buddhist Monk Jinghyo at Heungnyeongsa Temple Site, Yeongwol 영월 흥녕사지 징효대사탑비 寧越 興寧寺址 澄曉大師塔碑	Yeongwol County, Gangwon	1977-08-22, 2010-12-27 renamed	
613		Portrait of Sin Suk-ju 신숙주초상 申叔舟肖像	Cheongwon County, North Chungcheong	1977-11-15	
614		Monument for the Incense Burial Ceremony in Heungsa-ri, Sacheon 사천 흥사리 매향비 泗川 興士里 埋香碑	Sacheon, South Gyeongsang	1978-03-08, 2010-12-27 renamed	
615		Stone Standing Buddha in Jangjeong-ri, Ganghwa 강화 장정리 석조여래입상 江華 長井里 石造如來立像	Ganghwa County, Incheon	1978-03-08, 2010-08-25 renamed	
616		Daeseongjeon Shrine of Yeongcheonhyanggyo Local Confucian School 영천향교 대성전 永川鄕校 大成殿	Yeongcheon, North Gyeongsang	1978-04-11	
617		Gold Diadem Ornament from Cheonmachong Tomb 천마총 금제 관식 天馬塚 金製冠飾	Gyeongju, North Gyeongsang	1978-12-07	
618		Gold Diadem Ornament from Cheonmachong Tomb 천마총 금제 관식 天馬塚 金製冠飾	Gyeongju, North Gyeongsang	1978-12-07	
619		Necklace from Cheonmachong Tomb 천마총 목걸이 天馬塚 頸胸飾	Gyeongju, North Gyeongsang	1978-12-07	
620		Glass Cup from Cheonmachong Tomb 천마총 유리잔 天馬塚 琉璃盞	Gyeongju, North Gyeongsang	1978-12-07	
621		Sword with Ring Pommel from Cheonmachong Tomb 천마총 환두대도 天馬塚 環頭大刀	Gyeongju, North Gyeongsang	1978-12-07	
622		Three-legged Cauldron with a Handle from Cheonmachong Tomb 천마총 자루솥 天馬塚 鐎斗	Gyeongju, North Gyeongsang	1978-12-07	
623		Gold Bracelets and Rings from the North Mound of Hwangnamdaechong Tomb 황남대총 북분 금팔찌 및 금반지 皇南大塚北墳 金製釧 및 金製指環	Gyeongju, North Gyeongsang	1978-12-07	
624		Glass Cup from the North Mound of Hwangnamdaechong Tomb 황남대총 북분 유리잔 皇南大塚北墳 琉璃盞	Yongsan District, Seoul	1978-12-07	
625		Silver Diadem Ornament from the North Mound of Hwangnamdaechong Tomb 황남대총 북분 은제 관식 皇南大塚北墳 銀製冠飾	Gyeongju, North Gyeongsang	1978-12-07	
626		Gold High-footed Cup from the North Mound of Hwangnamdaechong Tomb 황남대총 북분 금제 고배 皇南大塚北墳 金製高杯	Gyeongju, North Gyeongsang	1978-12-07	
627		Silver Cup from the North Mound of Hwangnamdaechong Tomb 황남대총 북분 은잔 皇南大塚北墳 銀盞	Yongsan District, Seoul	1978-12-07	
628		Gold and Silver Bowls from the North Mound of Hwangnamdaechong Tomb 황남대총 북분 금은제 그릇 일괄 皇南大塚北墳 金銀器一括	Gyeongju, North Gyeongsang	1978-12-07	
629		Gold Waist Belt from the South Mound of Hwangnamdaechong Tomb 황남대총 남분 금제 허리띠 皇南大塚 南墳 金製 銙帶	Yongsan District, Seoul	1978-12-07	
630		Gold Diadem Ornament from the South Mound of Hwangnamdaechong Tomb 황남대총 남분 금제 관식 皇南大塚南墳 金製冠飾	Yongsan District, Seoul	1978-12-07	
631		Silver Crown from the South Mound of Hwangnamdaechong Tomb 황남대총 남분 은관 皇南大塚南墳 銀冠	Gyeongju, North Gyeongsang	1978-12-07	
632		Silver Arm Guards from the South Mound of Hwangnamdaechong Tomb 황남대총 남분 은제 팔뚝가리개 皇南大塚南墳 銀製肱甲	Gyeongju, North Gyeongsang	1978-12-07	
633		Gold Pendants from Hwangnam-dong, Gyeongju 경주 황남동 금제 드리개 慶州 皇南洞 金製垂飾	Gyeongju, North Gyeongsang	1978-12-07	
634		Glass Beads with Inlaid Design from Hwangnam-dong, Gyeongju 경주 황남동 상감 유리구슬 慶州 皇南洞 象嵌琉璃玉	Gyeongju, North Gyeongsang	1978-12-07	
635		Ornamented Dagger from Gyerim-ro, Gyeongju 경주 계림로 보검 慶州 鷄林路 寶劍	Gyeongju, North Gyeongsang	1978-12-07	
636		Earthenware Funerary Object in the Shape of an Auspicious Animal 도기 서수형 명기 陶器 瑞獸形 明器	Gyeongju, North Gyeongsang	1978-12-07	
637		Earthenware Horn Cup with Wagon Wheel Decoration 도기 바퀴장식 뿔잔 陶器 車輪飾 角杯	Jinju, South Gyeongsang	1978-12-07	
638		Gisa gyecheop (Album of Paintings of the Gathering of Elders) 기사계첩 耆社契帖	Seodaemun District, Seoul	1978-12-07	
639		Gisa gyecheop (Album of Paintings of the Gathering of Elders) 기사계첩 耆社契帖	Songpa District, Seoul	1978-12-07	
640		Incheon anmok (Vision of Five Supreme Patriarchs) 인천안목 人天眼目	Seodaemun District, Seoul	1978-12-07	
641		Seonjong yeonggajip (Essence of Zen Buddhism) 선종영가집 禪宗永嘉集	Seodaemun District, Seoul	1978-12-07	
642		Stone Fragments from Pyeongyangseong City Wall of Goguryeo 고구려 평양성 석편 高句麗 平壤城 石片	Seodaemun District, Seoul	1978-12-07	
643		Gilt-bronze Pensive Maitreya Bodhisattva 금동미륵보살반가사유상 金銅彌勒菩薩半跏思惟像	Yongin, Gyeonggi	1978-12-07	
644		White Porcelain Jar with Pine, Bamboo, and Human Figure Design in Underglaze Cobalt Blue 백자 청화송죽인물문 항아리 白磁 靑畵松竹人物文 立壺	Seodaemun District, Seoul	1978-12-07	
645		White Porcelain Jar with Cloud and Dragon Design in Underglaze Iron 백자 철화운룡문 항아리 白磁 鐵畵雲龍文 立壺	Seodaemun District, Seoul	1978-12-07	
646		Celadon Lidded Bowl with Inlaid Inscription of "Sangyakguk (Bureau of Medicine)" and Incised Cloud and Dragon Design 청자 상감‘상약국’명 음각운룡문 합 靑磁 象嵌‘尙藥局’銘 陰刻雲龍文 盒	Eumseong County, North Chungcheong	1978-12-07	
647		Cheonja Chongtong Gun 천자총통 天字銃筒	Jinju, South Gyeongsang	1978-12-07	
648		Seungja Chongtong Gun 승자총통 勝字銃筒	Yongsan District, Seoul	1978-12-07	
649		Stele with Inscription of “Muin Year” and Pedestal at Yeonhwasa Temple, Sejong 연기 연화사 무인명불비상 및 대좌 燕岐 蓮花寺 戊寅銘佛碑像 및 臺座	Yeonseo-myeon, Sejong	1978-12-07	
650		Stele of Seven Buddhas of Yeonhwasa Temple, Sejong 세종시 연화사 칠존불비상 世宗市 蓮花寺 七尊佛碑像	Yeonseo-myeon, Sejong	1978-12-07	
651		Documents of the Yeonan Yi Clan 연안이씨 종중 문적 延安李氏 宗中 文籍	Iksan, North Jeolla	1979-02-08	
652		Manuscript of Yi Hyeong-sang 이형상 수고본 李衡祥 手稿本	Yeongcheon, North Gyeongsang	1979-02-08	
653		Folding Screen of Embroidered Sagye bungyeongdo (Potted Plants During the Four Seasons) 자수 사계분경도 刺繡 四季盆景圖	Gangnam District, Seoul	1979-02-08	
654		Embroidered Monk's Outer Vestment 자수가사 刺繡袈裟	Gangnam District, Seoul	1979-02-08	
655		Rock-carved Buddhas in Noseok-ri, Chilgok 칠곡 노석리 마애불상군 漆谷 老石里 磨崖佛像群	Chilgok County, North Gyeongsang	1979-05-02, 2010-08-25 renamed	
656		Lion Stone Lantern in Front of the Stupa of State Preceptor Bogak at Cheongnyongsa Temple Site, Chungju 충주 청룡사지 보각국사탑 앞 사자 석등 忠州 靑龍寺址 普覺國師塔 앞 獅子 石燈	Chungju, North Chungcheong	1979-05-22, 2010-12-27 renamed	
657		Rock-carved Standing Buddha at Samcheonsa Temple Site, Seoul 서울 삼천사지 마애여래입상 서울 三川寺址 磨崖如來立像	Eunpyeong District, Seoul	1979-05-22, 2010-08-25 renamed	
658		Stele for State Preceptor Bogak at Cheongnyongsa Temple Site, Chungju 충주 청룡사지 보각국사탑비 忠州 靑龍寺址 普覺國師塔碑	Chungju, North Chungcheong	1979-05-22, 2010-12-27 renamed	
659		White Porcelain Bottle with Plum, Bird, and Bamboo Design in Underglaze Cobalt Blue 백자 청화매조죽문 병 白磁 靑畵梅鳥竹文 甁	Seocho District, Seoul	1979-04-30	
660		Report on Imjin War by Choe Hui-ryang 최희량 임란관련 고문서 - 첩보서목 崔希亮 壬亂關聯 古文書 - 捷報書目	Naju, South Jeolla	1979-07-26	
660-2		최희량 임란관련 고문서 - 교지 崔希亮 壬亂關聯 古文書 - 敎旨	Naju, South Jeolla	1979-07-26	
660-3		최희량 임란관련 고문서 - 시호망단자 崔希亮 壬亂關聯 古文書 - 諡號望單字	Naju, South Jeolla	1979-07-26	
