= List of Treasures of South Korea (1970–1974) =

The Treasures of South Korea designation was established in 1962 and is managed by the Korea Heritage Service (KHS; formerly "Cultural Heritage Administration"). This designation is distinct from the National Treasure designation. Covered here are items designated in the years 1970 through 1974.

== List ==
No. (Note: On November 19, 2021, the Cultural Heritage Administration removed the numbering system for all of its designations, including Treasure. Previously assigned numbers are preserved here for the sake of reference.)	Image	Official names (Note: (English, Hangul, Hanja/mixed script))	Location	Dates	Refs
518		Multi-story Stone Pagoda and Stone Lantern at Wondangam Hermitage of Haeinsa Temple, Hapcheon 합천 해인사 원당암 다층석탑 및 석등 陜川 海印寺 願堂庵 多層石塔 및 石燈	Hapcheon County, South Gyeongsang	1970-06-24, 2010-12-27 renamed	
519		Stone Seated Buddha of Gwallyongsa Temple, Changnyeong 창녕 관룡사 석조여래좌상 昌寧 觀龍寺 石造如來坐像	Changnyeong County, South Gyeongsang	1970-06-24, 2010-08-25 renamed	
520		West Three-story Stone Pagoda in Suljeong-ri, Changnyeong 창녕 술정리 서 삼층석탑 昌寧 述亭里 西 三層石塔	Changnyeong County, South Gyeongsang	1970-06-24, 2010-12-27 renamed	
521		Sungnyeoldang Shrine, Yeongcheon 영천 숭렬당 永川 崇烈堂	Yeongcheon, North Gyeongsang	1970-07-23	
522		Dosanseowondo (Dosanseowon Confucian Academy) by Kang Se-hwang 강세황필 도산서원도 姜世晃筆 陶山書院圖	Yongsan District, Seoul	1970-08-27	
523		Seokbo sangjeol (Episodes from the Life of Sakyamuni Buddha), Volumes 6, 9, 13, and 19 석보상절 釋譜詳節	Yongin, Gyeonggi	1970-12-30	
523-1		Seokbo sangjeol (Episodes from the Life of Sakyamuni Buddha), Volumes 6, 9, 13, and 19 석보상절 권6, 9, 13, 19 釋譜詳節 卷六, 九, 十三, 十九	Seocho District, Seoul	1970-12-30	
523-2		Seokbo sangjeol (Episodes from the Life of Sakyamuni Buddha), Volumes 23 and 24 석보상절 권23, 24 釋譜詳節 卷二十三, 二十四	Jung District, Seoul	1970-12-30	
523-3		Seokbo sangjeol (Episodes from the Life of Sakyamuni Buddha), Volume 11 석보상절 권11 釋譜詳節 卷十一	Yongsan District, Seoul	1970-12-30	
524-1		Books of the Oksan Branch of the Yeoju Yi Clan 여주이씨 옥산문중 전적 - 정덕계유사마방목 驪州李氏 玉山門中 典籍 -正德癸酉司馬榜目	Gyeongju, North Gyeongsang	1970-12-30	,
~~525~~		~~Samguk sagi (History of the Three Kingdoms)~~; ~~삼국사기~~; ~~三國史記~~	~~Gyeongju, North Gyeongsang~~	1970-12-30, 2018-02-22 removed, made National Treasure No. 322-1	
526		Calligraphy Collection of the Oksan Branch of the Yeoju Yi Clan 여주이씨 옥산문중 유묵-해동명적 驪州李氏 玉山門中 遺墨-海東名蹟	Gyeongju, North Gyeongsang	1970-12-30	
527		Album of Genre Paintings by Kim Hong-do 김홍도필 풍속도 화첩 金弘道筆 風俗圖 畵帖	Yongsan District, Seoul	1970-12-30	
528		Hanbyeongnu Pavilion in Cheongpung, Jecheon 제천 청풍 한벽루 堤川 淸風 寒碧樓	Jecheon, North Chungcheong	1971-01-08	
529		진도 금골산 오층석탑 (珍島 金骨山 五層石塔) (Five-story Stone Pagoda in Geumgolsan Mountain, Jindo)	Jindo County, South Jeolla	1971-01-08, 2010-12-27 renamed	
530		Rock-carved Standing Buddha Triad at Gaseobam Hermitage Site, Geocheang 거창 가섭암지 마애여래삼존입상 居昌 迦葉庵址 磨崖如來三尊立像	Geochang County, South Gyeongsang	1971-07-07, 2010-08-25 renamed	
531		Stupa of State Preceptor Jeongji and Stele at Yongmunsa Temple, Yangpyeong 양평 용문사 정지국사탑 및 비 楊平 龍門寺 正智國師塔 및 碑	Yangpyeong County, Gyeonggi	1971-07-07, 2010-12-27 renamed	
532		Stupa of Yeongguksa Temple, Yeongdong 영동 영국사 승탑 永同 寧國寺 僧塔	Yeongdong County, North Chungcheong	1971-07-07, 2010-12-27 renamed	
533		Three-story Stone Pagoda of Yeongguksa Temple, Yeongdong 영동 영국사 삼층석탑 永同 寧國寺 三層石塔	Yeongdong County, North Chungcheong	1971-07-07, 2010-12-27 renamed	
534		Stele for State Preceptor Wongak at Yeongguksa Temple, Yeongdong 영동 영국사 원각국사비 永同 寧國寺 圓覺國師碑	Yeongdong County, North Chungcheong	1971-07-07, 2010-12-27 renamed	
535		Three-story Stone Pagoda at Mangtapbong Peak of Yeongguksa Temple, Yeongdong 영동 영국사 망탑봉 삼층석탑 永同 寧國寺 望塔峰 三層石塔	Yeongdong County, North Chungcheong	1971-07-07, 2010-12-27 renamed	
536		Stone Standing Bhaisajyaguru Buddha in Pyeongchon-ri, Asan 아산 평촌리 석조약사여래입상 牙山 坪村里 石造藥師如來立像	Asan, South Chungcheong	1971-07-07	
537		Flagpole Supports in Eupnae-dong, Asan 아산 읍내동 당간지주 牙山 邑內洞 幢竿支柱	Asan, South Chungcheong	1971-07-07, 2010-12-27 renamed	
538		Flagpole Supports in Ogwan-ri, Hongseong 홍성 오관리 당간지주 洪城 五官里 幢竿支柱	Hongseong County, South Chungcheong	1971-07-07, 2010-12-27 renamed	
539		Ordination Platform of Yongyeonsa Temple, Dalseong 달성 용연사 금강계단 達城 龍淵寺 金剛戒壇	Dalseong County, Daegu	1971-07-07, 2010-12-27 renamed	
540		Four Lion Three-story Stone Pagoda in Gwaeseok-ri, Hongcheon 홍천 괘석리 사사자 삼층석탑 洪川 掛石里 四獅子 三層石塔	Hongcheon County, Gangwon	1971-07-07, 2010-12-27 renamed	
541		Stone Seated Buddha in Mulgeol-ri, Hongcheon 홍천 물걸리 석조여래좌상 洪川 物傑里 石造如來坐像	Hongcheon County, Gangwon	1971-07-07	
542		Stone Seated Vairocana Buddha in Mulgeol-ri, Hongcheon 홍천 물걸리 석조비로자나불좌상 洪川 物傑里 石造毘盧遮那佛坐像	Hongcheon County, Gangwon	1971-07-07, 2010-08-25 renamed	
543		Stone Pedestal in Mulgeol-ri, Hongcheon 홍천 물걸리 석조대좌 洪川 物傑里 石造臺座	Hongcheon County, Gangwon	1971-07-07, 2010-08-25 renamed	
544		Stone Pedestal and Mandorla in Mulgeol-ri, Hongcheon 홍천 물걸리 석조대좌 및 광배 洪川 物傑里 石造臺座 및 光背	Hongcheon County, Gangwon	1971-07-07, 2010-08-25 renamed	
545		Three-story Stone Pagoda in Mulgeol-ri, Hongcheon 홍천 물걸리 삼층석탑 洪川 物傑里 三層石塔	Hongcheon County, Gangwon	1971-07-07, 2010-12-27 renamed	
546		Stone Standing Buddha in Multae-ri, Jecheon 제천 물태리 석조여래입상 堤川 勿台里 石造如來立像	Jecheon, North Chungcheong	1971-07-07, 2010-08-25 renamed	
547-1		Relics Related to Kim Jeong-hui's Family 김정희 종가 유물 金正喜 宗家 遺物	Yongsan District, Seoul	1971-07-07	
547-1		김정희 종가 유물 - 수정염주 金正喜 宗家 遺物 - 水晶念珠	Yongsan District, Seoul	1971-07-07	
547-1		김정희 종가 유물 - 보제염주 金正喜 宗家 遺物 - 菩提念珠	Yongsan District, Seoul	1971-07-07	
547-1		김정희 종가 유물 - 운룡문단계연 金正喜 宗家 遺物 - 雲龍文端溪硯	Yongsan District, Seoul	1971-07-07	
547-1		김정희 종가 유물 - 유명연 金正喜 宗家 遺物 - 有銘硯	Yongsan District, Seoul	1971-07-07	
547-1		김정희 종가 유물 - 도찬문연 金正喜 宗家 遺物 - 饕餐文硯	Yongsan District, Seoul	1971-07-07	
547-1		김정희 종가 유물 - 모필 金正喜 宗家 遺物 - 毛筆	Yongsan District, Seoul	1971-07-07	
547-2		Relics Related to Kim Jeong-hui's Family 김정희 종가 유물 일괄 金正喜 宗家 遺物 一括	Seogwipo, Jeju	2006-07-18	
547-2		김정희 종가 유물 - 김정희유묵예서대련 金正喜 宗家 遺物 - 金正喜遺墨隸書對聯	Jung District, Seoul	1971-07-07	
547-2		김정희 종가 유물 金正喜 宗家 遺物	Yongsan District, Seoul	1971-07-07	
547-2		김정희 종가 유물 - 표지「을묘칠정」「금칠십재」 金正喜 宗家 遺物 - 表紙「乙卯七正」「金七十齋」	Yongsan District, Seoul	1971-07-07	
547-2		김정희 종가 유물 - 척독초본 金正喜 宗家 遺物 - 尺牘초本	Yongsan District, Seoul	1971-07-07	
547-2		김정희 종가 유물 - 표제 金正喜 宗家 遺物 - 表題	Yongsan District, Seoul	1971-07-07	
547-2		김정희 종가 유물 - 사공도시평첩 金正喜 宗家 遺物 - 司空圖詩評帖	Yongsan District, Seoul	1971-07-07	
547-2		김정희 종가 유물 - 표제 金正喜 宗家 遺物 - 表題	Yongsan District, Seoul	1971-07-07	
547-2		김정희 종가 유물 - 표제「충술근수교,훈묵의헌진장」 金正喜 宗家 遺物 - 表題「忠述謹受敎,訓墨의軒珍藏」	Yongsan District, Seoul	1971-07-07	
547-2		김정희 종가 유물 - 소재첩 金正喜 宗家 遺物 - 蘇齋帖	Yongsan District, Seoul	1971-07-07	
547-2		김정희 종가 유물 - 상지23년계미 金正喜 宗家 遺物 - 上之二十三年癸未	Yongsan District, Seoul	1971-07-07	
547-3		김정희 종가 유물 - 김정희서금반첩 金正喜 宗家 遺物 - 金正喜書金槃帖	Yongsan District, Seoul	1971-07-07	
547-4		김정희 종가 유물 - 김정희서심경첩 金正喜 宗家 遺物 - 金正喜書心經帖	Yongsan District, Seoul	1971-08-30	
547-5		김정희 종가 유물 - 김정희초상 金正喜 宗家 遺物 - 金正喜影幀	Yongsan District, Seoul	1971-07-07	
548-1		Calligraphy by Yi Hwang 이황필적 - 퇴도선생필법 및 퇴도선생유첩 李滉筆蹟 - 退陶先生筆法 및 退陶先生遺帖	Andong, North Gyeongsang	1971-08-30	
548-2		Calligraphy by Yi Hwang 이황 필적 - 선조유묵첩 李滉 筆蹟 - 先祖遺墨帖	Andong, North Gyeongsang	2010-01-04	
549		Documents of Gwon Ju’s Family 권주 종가 고문서 權柱 宗家 古文書	Andong, North Gyeongsang	1971-08-30	
549-1		권주 종가 고문서 - 분깃문기 權柱 宗家 古文書 - 分衿文記	Andong, North Gyeongsang	1971-08-30	
549-2		권주 종가 고문서 - 가대문기 權柱 宗家 古文書 - 家垈文記	Andong, North Gyeongsang	1971-08-30	
550		Juyeok cheongyeollok (Shallow Views on the Book of Changes) 주역천견록 周易淺見錄	Seodaemun District, Seoul	1971-08-30	
551		Siyong hyangakbo (Contemporary Music Scores) 시용향악보 時用鄕樂譜	Seodaemun District, Seoul	1971-08-30	
552		Jachi tonggam gangmok (Itemized Comprehensive Mirror for Aid in Government), Part 2 of Volume 19 자치통감강목 권19의하 資治通鑑綱目 卷十九之下	Seodaemun District, Seoul	1971-08-30	
553		Chunghyodang House of the Yean Yi Clan, Andong 안동 예안이씨 충효당 安東 禮安李氏 忠孝堂	Andong, North Gyeongsang	1971-08-30	
554		Taegojeong House, Dalseong 달성 태고정 達城 太古亭	Dalseong County, Daegu	1971-12-06	
555		Earthenware Boat-shaped Funerary Object 도기 배모양 명기 陶器 舟形 明器	Yongsan District, Seoul	1971-12-21	
556		Earthenware Shoe-shaped Funerary Objects 도기 신발모양 명기 陶器 履形 明器	Yongsan District, Seoul	1971-12-21	
557		Gold Earrings 금귀걸이 金製耳飾	Yongsan District, Seoul	1971-12-21	
558		Celadon Prunus Vase with Inlaid Cloud, Crane, Peony, and Chrysanthemum Design 청자 상감운학모란국화문 매병 靑磁 象嵌雲鶴牡丹菊花文 梅甁	Yongsan District, Seoul	1971-12-21	
559		Painted Lacquered Bowl 채화칠기 彩畵漆器	Yongsan District, Seoul	1971-12-21	
560		Bronze Seal of Ye Chieftain 청동 진솔선예백장 인장 靑銅 晋率善濊伯長 印章	Yongsan District, Seoul	1971-12-21	
561		Geumyeong Rain Gauge 금영 측우기 錦營 測雨器	Dongjak District, Seoul	1971-12-21	
562		Daeungjeon Hall of Hwanseongsa Temple, Gyeongsan 경산 환성사 대웅전 慶山 環城寺 大雄殿	Gyeongsan, North Gyeongsang	1971-12-23	
563		Rainbow Bridge of Heungguksa Temple, Yeosu 여수 흥국사 홍교 麗水 興國寺 虹橋	Yeosu, South Jeolla	1972-03-02, 2010-12-27 renamed	
564		Mannyeongyo Bridge in Yeongsan, Changnyeong 창녕 영산 만년교 昌寧 靈山 萬年橋	Changnyeong County, South Gyeongsang	1972-03-02, 2010-12-27 renamed	
565		Stone Seated Vairocana Buddha of Simboksa Temple, Pyeongtaek 평택 심복사 석조비로자나불좌상 平澤 深福寺 石造毘盧遮那佛坐像	Pyeongtaek, Gyeonggi	1972-03-02, 2010-08-25 renamed	
566		Portrait of Yu Geun 유근 초상 柳根 肖像	Goesan County, North Chungcheong	1972-07-06	
567		Iron Seated Buddha of Mangisa Temple, Pyeongtaek 평택 만기사 철조여래좌상 平澤 萬奇寺 鐵造如來坐像	Pyeongtaek, Gyeonggi	1972-07-22	
568-1		Relics Related to Yun Bong-gil 윤봉길의사유품 - 선서문 尹奉吉義士遺品 - 宣誓文	Yongsan District, Seoul	1972-08-16	
568-2		Relics Related to Yun Bong-gil 윤봉길의사 유품 - 윤봉길의사 이력서 및 유서 尹奉吉義士 遺品 - 尹奉吉義士 履歷書 및 遺書	Yongsan District, Seoul	1972-08-16	
568-3		Relics Related to Yun Bong-gil 윤봉길의사유품 - 회중시계 尹奉吉義士遺品 - 懷中時計	Yesan County, South Chungcheong	1972-08-16	
568-4		Relics Related to Yun Bong-gil 윤봉길의사유품 - 지갑부중국화폐 尹奉吉義士遺品 - 지갑附中國貨幣	Yesan County, South Chungcheong	1972-08-16	
568-5		Relics Related to Yun Bong-gil 윤봉길의사유품 - 윤봉길의사인 尹奉吉義士遺品 - 尹奉吉義士印	Yesan County, South Chungcheong	1972-08-16	
568-6		Relics Related to Yun Bong-gil 윤봉길의사유품 - 손수건 尹奉吉義士遺品 - 손수건	Yesan County, South Chungcheong	1972-08-16	
568-7		Relics Related to Yun Bong-gil 윤봉길의사유품 - 안경집 尹奉吉義士遺品 - 眼鏡集	Yesan County, South Chungcheong	1972-08-16	
568-8		Relics Related to Yun Bong-gil 윤봉길의사유품 - 일기 尹奉吉義士遺品 - 日記	Yesan County, South Chungcheong	1972-08-16	
568-9		Relics Related to Yun Bong-gil 윤봉길의사유품 - 월진회창립취지서 尹奉吉義士遺品 - 月進會創立趣旨書	Yesan County, South Chungcheong	1972-08-16	
568-10		Relics Related to Yun Bong-gil 윤봉길의사유품 - 농민독본 尹奉吉義士遺品 - 農民讀本	Yesan County, South Chungcheong	1972-08-16	
568-11		Relics Related to Yun Bong-gil 윤봉길의사유품 - 형틀대 尹奉吉義士遺品 - 刑틀臺	Yesan County, South Chungcheong	1972-08-16	
568-12		Relics Related to Yun Bong-gil 윤봉길의사유품 - 편지 尹奉吉義士遺品 - 便紙	Yesan County, South Chungcheong	1972-08-16	
568-13		Relics Related to Yun Bong-gil 윤봉길의사유품 - 월진회통장 尹奉吉義士遺品 - 月進會通帳	Seongnam, Gyeonggi	1976-05-21	
569		Calligraphy by An Jung-geun 안중근의사유묵 安重根義士遺墨	Gangnam District, Seoul	1972-08-16	
569-1		Calligraphy by An Jung-geun 안중근의사유묵 - 백인당중유태화 安重根義士遺墨 - 百忍堂中有泰和	서울 강남구	1972-08-16	
569-2		Calligraphy by An Jung-geun 안중근의사유묵 - 일일부독서구중생형극 安重根義士遺墨 - 一日不讀書口中生荊棘	Jung District, Seoul	1972-08-16	
569-3		Calligraphy by An Jung-geun 안중근의사유묵 - 년년세세화상사세세년년인부동 安重根義士遺墨 - 年年歲歲花相似歲歲年年人不同	Yongsan District, Seoul	1972-08-16	
569-4		Calligraphy by An Jung-geun 안중근의사유묵 - 치악의악식자부족여의 安重根義士遺墨 - 恥惡衣惡食者不足與議	~~Jongno District, Seoul~~	1972-08-16	
569-5		Calligraphy by An Jung-geun 안중근의사유묵 - 동양대세사묘현유지남아기안면화국미성유강개정략불개진가련 安重根義士遺墨 - 東洋大勢思杳玄有志男兒豈安眠和局未成猶慷慨政略不改眞可憐	Dongjak District, Seoul	1972-08-16	
569-6		Calligraphy by An Jung-geun 안중근의사유묵 - 견리사의견위수명 安重根義士遺墨 - 見利思義見危授命	Seo District, Busan	1972-08-16	
569-7		Calligraphy by An Jung-geun 안중근의사유묵 - 용공난용연포기재 安重根義士遺墨 - 庸工難用連抱奇材	Yongsan District, Seoul	1972-08-16	
569-8		Calligraphy by An Jung-geun 안중근의사유묵 - 인무원려난성대업 安重根義士遺墨 - 人無遠慮難成大業	Dongjak District, Seoul	1972-08-16	
569-9		Calligraphy by An Jung-geun 안중근의사유묵 - 오노봉위필청천일장지삼상작연지사아복중시 安重根義士遺墨 - 五老峰爲筆靑天一丈紙三湘作硯池寫我腹中詩	Mapo District, Seoul	1972-08-16	
569-10		Calligraphy by An Jung-geun 안중근의사유묵 - 세한연후지송백지부조 安重根義士遺墨 - 歲寒然後知松栢之不彫	Jung District, Seoul	1972-08-16	
569-11		Calligraphy by An Jung-geun 안중근의사유묵 - 사군천리이표촌성망안욕천행물부정 安重根義士遺墨 - 思君千里以表寸誠望眼欲穿幸勿負情	Gunpo, Gyeonggi	1972-08-16	
569-12		Calligraphy by An Jung-geun 안중근의사유묵 - 장부수사심여철의사임위기사운 安重根義士遺墨 - 丈夫雖死心如鐵義士臨危氣似雲	Dongjak District, Seoul	1972-08-16	
569-13		Calligraphy by An Jung-geun 안중근의사유묵 - 박학어문약지이례 安重根義士遺墨 - 博學於文約之以禮	Jung District, Seoul	1972-08-16	
569-14		Calligraphy by An Jung-geun 안중근의사유묵-제일강산 安重根義士遺墨-第一江山	Dongjak District, Seoul	1972-08-16	
569-15		Calligraphy by An Jung-geun 안중근의사유묵 - 청초당 安重根義士遺墨 - 靑草塘	Changwon, South Gyeongsang	1972-08-16	
569-16		Calligraphy by An Jung-geun 안중근의사유묵 - 고막고어자시 安重根義士遺墨 - 孤莫孤於自恃	Jung District, Busan	1972-08-16	
569-17		Calligraphy by An Jung-geun 안중근의사유묵 - 인지당 安重根義士遺墨 - 仁智堂	Yongsan District, Seoul	1972-08-16	
569-18		Calligraphy by An Jung-geun 안중근의사유묵 - 인내 安重根義士遺墨 - 忍耐	Gwangjin District, Seoul	1972-08-16	
569-19		Calligraphy by An Jung-geun 안중근의사유묵 - 극락 安重根義士遺墨 - 極樂	Jongno District, Seoul	1972-08-16	
569-20		Calligraphy by An Jung-geun 안중근의사유묵 - 운재 安重根義士遺墨 - 雲齋	Jongno District, Seoul	1972-08-16	
570		Relics Excavated from the Tombs, Goryeong (Presumed) 전 고령 일괄 유물 傳 高靈 一括遺物	Yongsan District, Seoul	1973-03-19	
571		Monument for the Naval Victories of Yi Sun-sin, Yeosu 여수 통제이공 수군대첩비 麗水 統制李公 水軍大捷碑	Yeosu, South Jeolla	1973-05-04, 2010-12-27 renamed	
572		Documents of the Goryeo Dynasty in Songgwangsa Temple, Suncheon 순천 송광사 고려고문서 順天 松廣寺 高麗古文書	Suncheon, South Jeolla	1973-07-10	
572-1		순천 송광사 고려고문서-수선사형지기 順天 松廣寺 高麗古文書-修禪社形止記	Suncheon, South Jeolla	1973-07-10	
572-2		순천 송광사 고려고문서-노비첩 順天 松廣寺 高麗古文書-奴婢帖	Suncheon, South Jeolla	1973-07-10	
573		Si cheongyeollok (Commentary on Book of Poetry) and Seo cheongyeollok (Commentary on Book of Documents 시천견록및서천견록 詩淺見錄및書淺見錄	Seodaemun District, Seoul	1973-07-10	
574		Haeseo amhaeng ilgi (Record of Secret Inspection in Hwanghae-do Province) by Bak Man-jeong 박만정 해서암행일기 朴萬鼎 海西暗行日記	Gijang County, Busan	1973-12-31	
575		Wooden Amitabha Buddha Altarpiece and Related Documents of Daeseungsa Temple, Mungyeong 문경 대승사 목각아미타여래설법상 관계문서 聞慶 大乘寺 木刻阿彌陀如來說法像 關係文書	Mungyeong, North Gyeongsang	1973-12-31, 2017-12-26 renamed	
576		Bronze Gong with Inscription of "Bongeopsa Temple" 봉업사명 청동북 奉業寺銘 靑銅金鼓	Seodaemun District, Seoul	1973-12-31	
577		Buncheong Basin-shaped Memorial Tablet with Inlaid Fish Design and Inscription of "the Fifth Jeongtong Year" 분청사기 상감‘정통5년’명 어문 반형 묘지 粉靑沙器 象嵌‘正統五年’銘 魚文 盤形 墓誌	Yongsan District, Seoul	1974-07-09	
578		Hanging Scroll Behind the Buddha in Daeungjeon Hall of Heungguksa Temple 흥국사대웅전후불탱 興國寺大雄殿後佛幀	Yeosu, South Jeolla	1974-07-09	
579		Stupa from Oesa-ri, Goesan 괴산 외사리 승탑 槐山 外沙里 僧塔	Seongbuk District, Seoul	1974-10-02, 2010-12-27 renamed	
580		Five-story Stone Pagoda, Mungyeong 문경 오층석탑 聞慶 五層石塔	Seongbuk District, Seoul	1974-10-02, 2010-12-27 renamed	
581		Rock-carved Seated Buddha at Golguram Hermitage, Gyeongju 경주 골굴암 마애여래좌상 慶州 骨窟庵 磨崖如來坐像	Gyeongju, North Gyeongsang	1974-12-30, 2010-08-25 renamed	
582		Printing Woodblocks of Worin seokbo (Episodes from the Life of Sakyamuni Buddha) 월인석보목판 月印釋譜木板	Gongju, South Chungcheong	1974-12-31	
