= List of Treasures of South Korea (1965–1969) =

The Treasures of South Korea designation was established in 1962 and is managed by the Korea Heritage Service (KHS; formerly "Cultural Heritage Administration"). This designation is distinct from the National Treasure designation. Covered here are items designated in the years 1965 through 1969.

== List ==
Treasures of South Korea designated 1965–1969
| No. (Note: On November 19, 2021, the Cultural Heritage Administration removed the numbering system for all of its designations, including Treasure. Previously assigned numbers are preserved here for the sake of reference.) | Image | Official names (Note: (English, Hangul, Hanja/mixed script)) | Location | Dates | Refs |
| 415 | | Dry-lacquered Bodhisattva of Girimsa Temple, Gyeongju 경주 기림사 건칠보살반가상 慶州 祇林寺 乾漆菩薩半跏像 | Gyeongju, North Gyeongsang | 1965-04-01 | |
| 416 | | Celadon Stools with Openwork Ring Design 청자 투각고리문 의자 靑磁 透刻連環文 墩 | Seodaemun District, Seoul | 1965-04-01 | |
| 417 | | Hongmu jeongun yeokhun (Correct Rhymes from the Hongwu Reign with Korean Translation and Commentaries), Volumes 3-16 홍무정운역훈 권3~16 洪武正韻譯訓 卷三~十六 | Seongbuk District, Seoul | 1965-04-01 | |
| 418 | | Jewang ungi (Songs of Emperors and Kings) 제왕운기 帝王韻紀 | Jongno District, Seoul | 1965-04-01 | |
| ~~419~~ | | ~~삼국유사 권제3-5~~; ~~三國遺事 卷第三-五~~ | ~~Uiwang, Gyeonggi~~ | 1965-04-01, 2003-02-03 removed, made National Treasure No. 306 | |
| 420 | | Bronze Incense Burner with Silver-inlaid Design of Baekjangam Hermitage 백장암청동은입사향로 百丈庵靑銅銀入絲香爐 | Gimje, North Jeolla | 1965-07-16 | |
| 421 | | Wooden Amitabha Buddha Altarpiece at Yaksuam Hermitage of Silsangsa Temple, Namwon 남원 실상사 약수암 목각아미타여래설법상 南原 實相寺 藥水庵 木刻阿彌陀如來說法像 | Gimje, North Jeolla | 1965-07-16 | |
| 422 | | Iron Seated Buddha of Seonwonsa Temple, Namwon 남원 선원사 철조여래좌상 南原 禪院寺 鐵造如來坐像 | Namwon, North Jeolla | 1965-07-16 | |
| 423 | | Rock-carved Seated Buddha in Singye-ri, Namwon 남원 신계리 마애여래좌상 南原 新溪里 磨崖如來坐像 | Namwon, North Jeolla | 1965-07-16 | |
| 424 | | Stone Seated Buddha of Cheongnyongsa Temple, Yecheon 예천 청룡사 석조여래좌상 醴泉 靑龍寺 石造如來坐像 | Yecheon County, North Gyeongsang | 1965-07-16, 2010-08-25 renamed | |
| 425 | | Stone Seated Vairocana Buddha of Cheongnyongsa Temple, Yecheon 예천 청룡사 석조비로자나불좌상 醴泉 靑龍寺 石造毘盧遮那佛坐像 | Yecheon County, North Gyeongsang | 1965-07-16, 2010-08-25 renamed | |
| 426 | | Three-story Stone Pagoda in Dongbon-ri, Yecheon 예천 동본리 삼층석탑 醴泉 東本里 三層石塔 | Yecheon County, North Gyeongsang | 1965-07-16, 2010-12-27 renamed | |
| 427 | | Stone Standing Buddha in Dongbon-ri, Yecheon 예천 동본리 석조여래입상 醴泉 東本里 石造如來立像 | Yecheon County, North Gyeongsang | 1965-07-16, 2010-08-25 renamed | |
| 428 | | Stupa of State Preceptor Bogak and Stele at Ingaksa Temple, Gunwi 군위 인각사 보각국사탑 및 비 軍威 麟角寺 普覺國師塔 및 碑 | Gunwi County, Daegu | 1965-09-01, 2010-12-27 renamed | |
| 429 | | Three-story Stone Pagoda of Bulgulsa Temple, Gyeongsan 경산 불굴사 삼층석탑 慶山 佛窟寺 三層石塔 | Gyeongsan, North Gyeongsang | 1965-09-01, 2010-12-27 renamed | |
| 430 | | Stupa of Bogyeongsa Temple, Pohang 포항 보경사 승탑 浦項 寶鏡寺 僧塔 | Pohang, North Gyeongsang | 1965-09-01 | |
| 431 | | Stone Seated Buddha at Gwanbong Peak in Palgongsan Mountain, Gyeongsan 경산 팔공산 관봉 석조여래좌상 慶山 八公山 冠峰 石造如來坐像 | Gyeongsan, North Gyeongsang | 1965-09-01, 2010-08-25 renamed | |
| ~~432~~ | | ~~태안마애삼존불~~; ~~泰安磨崖三尊佛~~ | ~~Taean County, South Chungcheong~~ | 1966-02-28, 2004-08-31 removed, made National Treasure No. 307 | |
| 433 | | Stone Seated Vairocana Buddha of Gagyeonsa Temple, Goesan 괴산 각연사 석조비로자나불좌상 槐山 覺淵寺 石造毘盧遮那佛坐像 | Goesan County, North Chungcheong | 1966-02-28, 2010-08-25 renamed | |
| 434 | | Daeungjeon Hall of Beomeosa Temple, Busan 부산 범어사 대웅전 釜山 梵魚寺 大雄殿 | Geumjeong District, Busan | 1966-02-28 | |
| 435 | | Five-story Stone Pagoda at Bongeopsa Temple Site, Anseong 안성 봉업사지 오층석탑 安城 奉業寺址 五層石塔 | Anseong, Gyeonggi | 1966-02-28, 2010-12-27 renamed | |
| 436 | | Stone Seated Vairocana Buddha of Bulgoksa Temple, Changwon 창원 불곡사 석조비로자나불좌상 昌原 佛谷寺 石造毘盧遮那佛坐像 | Changwon, South Gyeongsang | 1966-02-28, 2010-08-25 renamed | |
| 437 | | Certificate of Meritorious Subject Issued to Kim Hoe-ryeon 김회련 개국원종공신녹권 金懷鍊 開國原從功臣錄券 | Jeongeup, North Jeolla | 1966-02-28 | |
| 438 | | Royal Edict of Appointment Issued to Kim Hoe-ryeon 김회련 고신왕지 金懷鍊告身王旨 | Jeongeup, North Jeolla | 1966-02-28 | |
| 439 | | Stupa of Master Doui at Jinjeonsa Temple Site, Yangyang 양양 진전사지 도의선사탑 襄陽 陳田寺址 道義禪師塔 | Yangyang County, Gangwon | 1966-02-28, 2010-12-27 renamed | |
| 440 | | Eight Gifts from Ming Emperor in Chungnyeolsa Shrine, Tongyeong 통영 충렬사 팔사품 일괄 統營 忠烈祠 八賜品 一括 | Tongyeong, South Gyeongsang | 1966-03-04 | |
| 441 | | Stupa with Twelve Zodiac Animal Deities in Relief from Taehwasa Temple Site, Ulsan 울산 태화사지 십이지상 사리탑 蔚山 太和寺址 十二支像 舍利塔 | Nam District, Ulsan | 1966-03-31, 2010-12-27 renamed | |
| 442 | | Gwangajeong House in Yangdong, Gyeongju 경주 양동 관가정 慶州 良洞 觀稼亭 | Gyeongju, North Gyeongsang | 1966-04-11 | |
| 443 | | Three-story Stone Pagoda at Hyangseongsa Temple Site, Sokcho 속초 향성사지 삼층석탑 束草 香城寺址 三層石塔 | Sokcho, Gangwon | 1966-08-25, 2010-12-27 renamed | |
| 444 | | Three-story Stone Pagoda at Seollimwon Temple Site, Yangyang 양양 선림원지 삼층석탑 襄陽 禪林院址 三層石塔 | Yangyang County, Gangwon | 1966-09-21, 2010-12-27 renamed | |
| 445 | | Stone Lantern at Seollimwon Temple Site, Yangyang 양양 선림원지 석등 襄陽 禪林院址 石燈 | Yangyang County, Gangwon | 1966-09-21, 2010-12-27 renamed | |
| 446 | | Stele for Master Honggak at Seollimwon Temple Site, Yangyang 양양 선림원지 홍각선사탑비 襄陽 禪林院址 弘覺禪師塔碑 | Yangyang County, Gangwon | 1966-09-21, 2010-12-27 renamed | |
| 447 | | Stupa at Seollimwon Temple Site, Yangyang 양양 선림원지 승탑 襄陽 禪林院址 僧塔 | Yangyang County, Gangwon | 1966-09-21, 2010-12-27 renamed | |
| 448 | | Hwaeomgangdang Lecture Hall of Bongjeongsa Temple, Andong 안동 봉정사 화엄강당 安東 鳳停寺 華嚴講堂 | Andong, North Gyeongsang | 1967-06-23 | |
| 449 | | Gogeumdang Hall of Bongjeongsa Temple, Andong 안동 봉정사 고금당 安東 鳳停寺 古金堂 | Andong, North Gyeongsang | 1967-06-23 | |
| 450 | | Head House of the Uiseong Kim Clan, Andong 안동 의성김씨 종택 安東 義城金氏 宗宅 | Andong, North Gyeongsang | 1967-06-23 | |
| 451 | | Relics Related to Three Meritorious Subjects in Taesamyo Shrine, Andong 안동 태사묘 삼공신 유물 일괄 安東 太師廟 三功臣 遺物 一括 | Andong, North Gyeongsang | 1967-06-23 | |
| 452 | | Celadon Ewer in the Shape of a Turtle-dragon 청자 구룡형 주전자 靑磁 龜龍形 注子 | Yongsan District, Seoul | 1967-06-21 | |
| 453 | | Green-glazed Earthenware Cup with Stand 도기 녹유 탁잔 陶器 綠釉 托盞 | Yongsan District, Seoul | 1967-06-21 | |
| 454 | | Gold Bracelets from Noseo-dong, Gyeongju 경주 노서동 금팔찌 慶州 路西洞 金製釧 | Yongsan District, Seoul | 1967-06-21 | |
| 455 | | Gold Earrings from Hwango-dong, Gyeongju 경주 노서동 금귀걸이 慶州 路西洞 金製耳飾 | Yongsan District, Seoul | 1967-06-21, 2018-10-30 renamed | |
| 456 | | Gold Necklace from Noseo-dong, Gyeongju 경주 노서동 금목걸이 慶州 路西洞 金製頸飾 | Yongsan District, Seoul | 1967-06-21 | |
| 457 | | Detached Quarters of the Head House of the Yecheon Gwon Clan 예천권씨 초간종택 별당 醴泉權氏 草澗宗宅 別堂 | Yecheon County, North Gyeongsang | 1967-06-23 | |
| ~~458~~ | | ~~쌍계사적묵당~~; ~~雙磎寺寂默堂~~ | ~~Hadong County, South Gyeongsang~~ | 1967-06-23, 1968-12-16 removed | |
| 459 | | Seven-story Stone Brick Pagoda in Jangnak-dong, Jecheon 제천 장락동 칠층모전석탑 堤川 長樂洞 七層模塼石塔 | Jecheon, North Chungcheong | 1967-06-23, 2010-12-27 renamed | |
| 460 | | Relics Related to Ryu Seong-ryong’s Family 유성룡 종가 유물 柳成龍 宗家 遺物 | Andong, North Gyeongsang | 1967-07-15 | |
| 461 | | Rock-carved Seven Buddhas in Cheolcheon-ri, Naju 나주 철천리 마애칠불상 羅州 鐵川里 磨崖七佛像 | Naju, South Jeolla | 1968-06-10, 2010-08-25 renamed | |
| 462 | | Stone Standing Buddha in Cheolcheon-ri, Naju 나주 철천리 석조여래입상 羅州 鐵川里 石造如來立像 | Naju, South Jeolla | 1968-06-10, 2010-08-25 renamed | |
| 463 | | Stele for Buddhist Monk Jingong at Heungbeopsa Temple Site, Wonju 원주 흥법사지 진공대사탑비 原州 興法寺址 眞空大師塔碑 | Wonju, Gangwon | 1968-07-05, 2010-12-27 renamed | |
| 464 | | Three-story Stone Pagoda at Heungbeopsa Temple Site, Wonju 원주 흥법사지 삼층석탑 原州 興法寺址 三層石塔 | Wonju, Gangwon | 1968-07-05, 2010-12-27 renamed | |
| 465 | | Three-story Stone Pagoda in Sinwol-ri, Yeongcheon 영천 신월리 삼층석탑 永川 新月里 三層石塔 | Yeongcheon, North Gyeongsang | 1968-12-19, 2010-12-27 renamed | |
| 466 | | Three-story Stone Pagoda of Maneosa Temple, Miryang 밀양 만어사 삼층석탑 密陽 萬魚寺 三層石塔 | Miryang, South Gyeongsang | 1968-12-19, 2010-12-27 renamed | |
| 467 | 가운데 | Three-story Stone Pagoda of Pyochungsa Temple, Miryang 밀양 표충사 삼층석탑 密陽 表忠寺 三層石塔 | Miryang, South Gyeongsang | 1968-12-19, 2010-12-27 renamed | |
| 468 | | Three-story Stone Pagoda in Sungjin-ri, Miryang 밀양 숭진리 삼층석탑 密陽 崇眞里 三層石塔 | Miryang, South Gyeongsang | 1968-12-19, 2010-12-27 renamed | |
| 469 | | Three-story Stone Pagoda in Naksan-ri, Gumi 구미 낙산리 삼층석탑 龜尾 洛山里 三層石塔 | Gumi, North Gyeongsang | 1968-12-19, 2010-12-27 renamed | |
| 470 | | Stone Pagoda of Dorisa Temple, Gumi 구미 도리사 석탑 龜尾 桃李寺 石塔 | Gumi, North Gyeongsang | 1968-12-19, 2010-12-27 renamed | |
| 471 | | Alms Bowl Pagoda of Tongdosa Temple, Yangsan 양산 통도사 봉발탑 梁山 通度寺 奉鉢塔 | Yangsan, South Gyeongsang | 1968-12-19, 2010-12-27 renamed | |
| 472 | | Stupa at Bocheonsa Temple Site, Uiryeong 의령 보천사지 승탑 宜寧 寶泉寺址 僧塔 | Uiryeong County, South Gyeongsang | 1968-12-19, 2010-12-27 renamed | |
| 473 | | Three-story Stone Pagoda of Beopgyesa Temple, Sancheong 산청 법계사 삼층석탑 山淸 法界寺 三層石塔 | Sancheong County, South Gyeongsang | 1968-12-19, 2010-12-27 renamed | |
| 474 | | Three-story Stone Pagoda of Byeoksongsa Temple, Hamyang 함양 벽송사 삼층석탑 咸陽 碧松寺 三層石塔 | Hamyang County, South Gyeongsang | 1968-12-19, 2010-12-27 renamed | |
| 475 | | Sohoheon House, Andong 안동 소호헌 安東 蘇湖軒 | Andong, North Gyeongsang | 1968-12-19 | |
| ~~476~~ | | ~~금산사대적광전~~; ~~金山寺大寂光殿~~ | ~~Gimje, North Jeolla~~ | 1968-12-19, 1986-12-06 destroyed, 1987-01-01 removed | |
| 477 | | Records of Property Inheritance of Yi I and His Siblings 이이 남매 화회문기 李珥 男妹 和會文記 | Gwangjin District, Seoul | 1968-12-19 | |
| 478 | | Bronze Bell of Gapsa Temple 갑사동종 甲寺銅鐘 | Gongju, South Chungcheong | 1968-12-19 | |
| ~~479~~ | | ~~Bronze bell of Naksansa Temple~~; ~~낙산사동종~~; ~~洛山寺銅鐘~~ | ~~Yangyang County, Gangwon~~ | 1968-12-19, 2005-04-05 destroyed, 2005-07-07 removed | |
| 480 | | Three-story Stone Pagoda at Yeongamsa Temple Site, Hapcheon 합천 영암사지 삼층석탑 陜川 靈岩寺址 三層石塔 | Hapcheon County, South Gyeongsang | 1968-12-19, 2010-12-27 renamed | |
| 481 | | Painting Albums of the Haenam Yun Clan 해남 윤씨 가전 고화첩 일괄 海南 尹氏 家傳 古畵帖 一括 | Haenam County, South Jeolla | 1968-12-19 | |
| 482 | | Documents of Yun Seon-do’s Family 윤선도 종가 문적 尹善道 宗家 文籍 | Haenam County, South Jeolla | 1968-12-19 | |
| 483 | | Documents Related to Slave Inheritance to Yun Dan-hak 윤단학 노비허여문기 및 입안 尹丹鶴 奴婢許與文記 및 立案 | Haenam County, South Jeolla | 1968-12-19 | |
| 484 | | Hojong ilgi (Diary of Royal Attendant) by Kim Yong 김용 호종일기 金涌 扈從日記 | Andong, North Gyeongsang | 1968-12-19 | |
| 485 | | Daeseong jiseong munseonwang jeonjwado (Confucius and His Disciples) 대성지성문선왕전좌도 大成至聖文宣王殿坐圖 | Yeongju, North Gyeongsang | 1968-12-19 | |
| 486 | | Buddhist Altar at Baekheungam Hermitage of Eunhaesa Temple, Yeongcheon 영천 은해사 백흥암 수미단 永川 銀海寺 百興庵 須彌壇 | Yeongcheon, North Gyeongsang | 1968-12-19 | |
| 487 | | Portrait of Jeong Tak 정탁초상 鄭琢 肖像 | Andong, North Gyeongsang | 1968-12-19 | |
| 488 | | Stele for State Preceptor Hyeso at Chiljangsa Temple, Anseong 안성 칠장사 혜소국사비 安城 七長寺 慧炤國師碑 | Anseong, Gyeonggi | 1968-12-19, 2010-12-27 renamed | |
| 489 | | Tortoise-shaped Pedestal at Yeongamsa Temple Site, Hapcheon 합천 영암사지 귀부 陜川 靈岩寺址 龜趺 | Hapcheon County, South Gyeongsang | 1968-12-19, 2010-12-27 renamed | |
| 490 | | Rock-carved Standing Buddha in Geumosan Mountain, Gumi 구미 금오산 마애여래입상 龜尾 金烏山 磨崖如來立像 | Gumi, North Gyeongsang | 1968-12-19, 2010-08-25 renamed | |
| 491 | | Stone Seated Buddha of Yonghwasa Temple, Yangsan 양산 용화사 석조여래좌상 梁山 龍華寺 石造如來坐像 | Yangsan, South Gyeongsang | 1968-12-19, 2010-08-25 renamed | |
| 492 | | Stone Seated Buddha in Haepyeong-ri, Gumi 구미 해평리 석조여래좌상 龜尾 海平里 石造如來坐像 | Gumi, North Gyeongsang | 1968-12-19, 2010-08-25 renamed | |
| 494 | | Documents of Jeong Tak 정탁 문적 - 약포유고 및 고문서 鄭琢 文籍 - 藥圃遺稿 및 古文書 | Andong, North Gyeongsang | 1968-12-19 | |
| 495 | | Bronze Gong of Okcheonsa Temple, Goseong 고성 옥천사 청동북 固城 玉泉寺 靑銅金鼓 | Goseong County, South Gyeongsang | 1968-12-19 | |
| 496 | 가운데 | Stone Lantern in Gyeseong-ri, Hwacheon 화천 계성리 석등 華川 啓星里 石燈 | Hwacheon County, Gangwon | 1968-12-19, 2010-12-27 renamed | |
| 497 | | Three-story Stone Pagoda in Osaek-ri, Yangyang 양양 오색리 삼층석탑 襄陽 五色里 三層石塔 | Yangyang County, Gangwon | 1968-12-19, 2010-12-27 renamed | |
| 498 | | Three-story Stone Pagoda in Gusan-ri, Uljin 울진 구산리 삼층석탑 蔚珍 九山里 三層石塔 | Uljin County, North Gyeongsang | 1968-12-19, 2010-12-27 renamed | |
| 499 | | Seven-story Stone Pagoda of Naksansa Temple, Yangyang 양양 낙산사 칠층석탑 襄陽 洛山寺 七層石塔 | Yangyang County, Gangwon | 1968-12-19, 2010-12-27 renamed | |
| 500 | | Daeungjeon Hall of Ssanggyesa Temple, Hadong 하동 쌍계사 대웅전 河東 雙磎寺 大雄殿 | Hadong County, South Gyeongsang | 1968-12-19 | |
| 493 | | Stone Seated Buddha of Mubongsa Temple, Miryang 밀양 무봉사 석조여래좌상 密陽 舞鳳寺 石造如來坐像 | Miryang, South Gyeongsang | 1969-06-24, 2010-08-25 renamed | |
| 501 | | Red Certificates Issued to Jang Gye and Red and White Certificates Issued to Jang Mal-son 장계 홍패 및 장말손 백패·홍패 張桂 紅牌 및 張末孫 白牌·紅牌 | Yeongju, North Gyeongsang | 1969-02-19 | |
| 502 | | Portrait of Jang Mal-son 장말손초상 張末孫 肖像 | Yeongju, North Gyeongsang | 1969-02-19 | |
| 503 | | Monument for the Victory at Myeongnyang Battle, Haenam 해남 명량대첩비 海南 鳴梁大捷碑 | Haenam County, South Jeolla | 1969-06-16, 2010-12-27 renamed | |
| 504 | | Three-story Stone Pagoda in Sincheon-ri, Yeonggwang 영광 신천리 삼층석탑 靈光 新川里 三層石塔 | Yeonggwang County, South Jeolla | 1969-06-16, 2010-12-27 renamed | |
| 505 | | Stone Flagpolein Gaeksa-ri, Damyang 담양 객사리 석당간 潭陽 客舍里 石幢竿 | Damyang County, South Jeolla | 1969-06-16, 2010-12-27 renamed | |
| 506 | | Five-story Stone Pagoda in Namsan-ri, Damyang 담양 남산리 오층석탑 潭陽 南山里 五層石塔 | Damyang County, South Jeolla | 1969-06-16, 2010-12-27 renamed | |
| 507 | | Stele for Buddhist Monk Seongak at Muwisa Temple, Gangjin 강진 무위사 선각대사탑비 康津 無爲寺 先覺大師塔碑 | Gangjin County, South Jeolla | 1969-06-16, 2010-12-27 renamed | |
| 508 | | Stone Standing Bodhisattva in Sapgyo-eup, Yesan 예산 삽교읍 석조보살입상 禮山 揷橋邑 石造菩薩立像 | Yesan County, South Chungcheong | 1969-06-21, 2010-08-25 renamed | |
| 509 | | Three-story Stone Pagoda in Nongok-ri, Gurye 구례 논곡리 삼층석탑 求禮 論谷里 三層石塔 | Gurye County, South Jeolla | 1969-06-21, 2010-12-27 renamed | |
| 510 | | Three-story Stone Pagoda in Giseong-ri, Chilgok 칠곡 기성리 삼층석탑 漆谷 箕聖里 三層石塔 | Chilgok County, North Gyeongsang | 1969-06-21, 2010-12-27 renamed | |
| 511 | | Five-story Stone Pagoda in Gyesan-ri, Cheongwon 청주 계산리 오층석탑 淸州 桂山里 五層石塔 | Cheongju, North Chungcheong | 1969-07-18, 2010-12-27 renamed, 2015-09-25 renamed | |
| 512 | | Iron Seated Buddha of Danhosa Temple, Chungju 충주 단호사 철조여래좌상 忠州 丹湖寺 鐵造如來坐像 | Chungju, North Chungcheong | 1969-07-18 | |
| 513 | | Iron Seated Buddha in Seonwon-dong, Yeongcheon 영천 선원동 철조여래좌상 永川 仙源洞 鐵造如來坐像 | Yeongcheon, North Gyeongsang | 1969-07-30 | |
| 514 | | Gilt-bronze Seated Bodhisattva at Unbuam Hermitage of Eunhaesa Temple, Yeongcheon 영천 은해사 운부암 금동보살좌상 永川 銀海寺 雲浮庵 金銅菩薩坐像 | Yeongcheon, North Gyeongsang | 1969-07-30 | |
| 515 | | Records of Property Inheritance to Princess Suksin 숙신옹주 가옥허여문기 淑愼翁主 家屋許與文記 | Yongsan District, Seoul | 1969-07-30 | |
| 516 | | Ojakbi Monument with Inscription of "Musul Year," Daegu 대구 무술명 오작비 大邱 戊戌銘 塢作碑 | Buk District, Daegu | 1969-11-07, 2010-12-27 renamed | |
| 517 | | Cheongjebi Monument, Yeongcheon 영천 청제비 永川 菁堤碑 | Yeongcheon, North Gyeongsang | 1969-11-21, 2010-12-27 renamed | |
