= Treasure (South Korean designation) =

National-level heritage designation

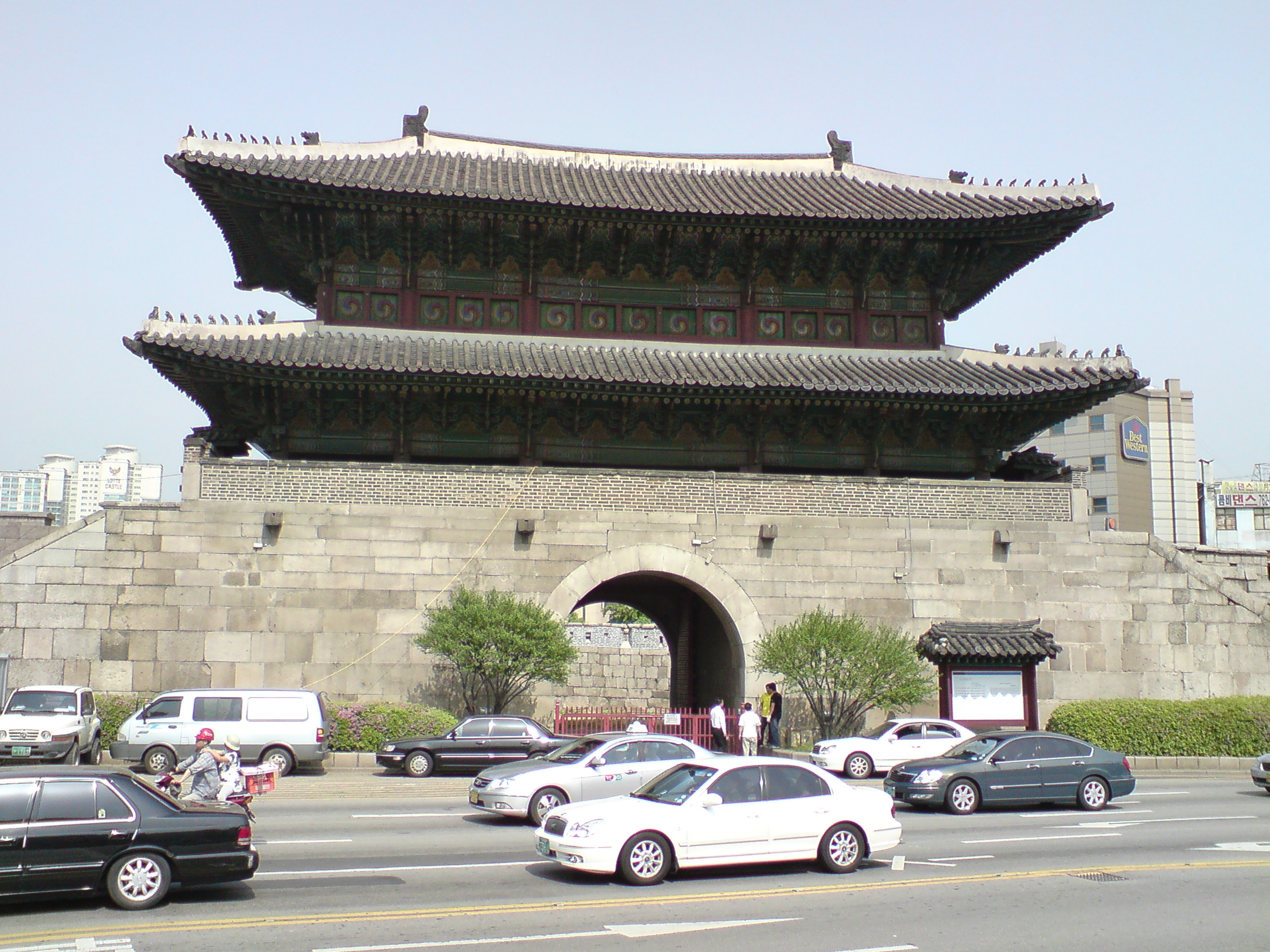
- Dongdaemun (officially Heunginjimun), Treasure #1

Korean name
- Hangul: 보물
- Hanja: 寶物
- RR: Bomul
- MR: Pomul

Treasure (Korean: 보물) is a national-level designation in the heritage preservation system of South Korea for tangible assets with historic, artistic, or academic value. It is separate from the National Treasure designation. The label was established in 1962 and is managed by the Korea Heritage Service (KHS).

Originally, each item with the designation was given a number; these numbers were given sequentially and do not indicate the relative importance of the item. The number system was removed on November 19, 2021. A diverse variety of assets have received the designation, including buildings, books, documents, paintings, sculptures, and crafts.

== Lists ==
As of February 2025, there are 2,325 Treasures.

- Treasures designated in 1963–1964
- Treasures designated in 1965–1969
- Treasures designated in 1970–1974
- Treasures designated in 1975–1979
- Treasures designated in 1980–1984
- Treasures designated in 1985–1989
- Treasures designated in 1990–1994
- Treasures designated in 1995–1999
- Treasures designated in 2000–2004
- Treasures designated in 2005–2009
- Treasures designated in 2010–2014
- Treasures designated in 2015–2019
- Treasures designated in 2020–2024
