= List of Treasures of South Korea (1963–1964) =

The Treasures of South Korea designation was established in 1962 and is managed by the Korea Heritage Service (KHS; formerly "Cultural Heritage Administration"). This designation is distinct from the National Treasure designation. Covered here are items designated in the years 1934 and 1964.

== List ==
No. (Note: On November 19, 2021, the Cultural Heritage Administration removed the numbering system for all of its designations, including Treasure. Previously assigned numbers are preserved here for the sake of reference.)	Image	Official names (Note: (English, Hangul, Hanja/mixed script))	Location	Dates	Refs
1		Heunginjimun Gate, Seoul 서울 흥인지문 서울 興仁之門	Jongno District, Seoul	1963-01-21	
2		Old Bronze Bell of Bosingak Pavilion 옛 보신각 동종 舊普信閣 銅鍾	Yongsan District, Seoul	1963-01-21	
3		Stele for the Construction of Daewongaksa Temple at Wongaksa Temple Site, Seoul 서울 원각사지 대원각사비 서울 圓覺寺址 大圓覺寺碑	Jongno District, Seoul	1963-01-21, 2010-12-27 renamed	
4		Flagpole Supports at Jungchosa Temple Site, Anyang 안양 중초사지 당간지주 安養 中初寺址 幢竿支柱	Anyang, Gyeonggi	1963-01-21, 2010-12-27 renamed	
~~5~~		~~중초사지삼층석탑~~; ~~中初寺址三層石塔~~	~~Anyang, Gyeonggi~~	1963-01-21, 1997-01-01 removed	
6		Stele for Buddhist Monk Wonjong at Godalsa Temple Site, Yeoju 여주 고달사지 원종대사탑비 驪州 高達寺址 元宗大師塔碑	Yeoju, Gyeonggi	1963-01-21, 2010-12-27 renamed	
7		Stupa of Buddhist Monk Wonjong at Godalsa Temple Site, Yeoju 여주 고달사지 원종대사탑 驪州 高達寺址 元宗大師塔	Yeoju, Gyeonggi	1963-01-21, 2010-12-27 renamed	
8		Stone Pedestal at Godalsa Temple Site, Yeoju 여주 고달사지 석조대좌 驪州 高達寺址 石造臺座	Yeoju, Gyeonggi	1963-01-21, 2010-08-25 renamed	
9		Stele for State Preceptor Hyeono at Seobongsa Temple Site, Yongin 용인 서봉사지 현오국사탑비 龍仁 瑞鳳寺址 玄悟國師塔碑	Yongin, Gyeonggi	1963-01-21, 2010-12-27 renamed	
10		Five-story Stone Pagoda in Jangjeong-ri, Ganghwa 강화 장정리 오층석탑 江華 長井里 五層石塔	Ganghwa County, Incheon	1963-01-21, 2010-12-27 renamed	
11-8 (Note: Previously no. 11)		Bronze Bell Cast by Buddhist Monk Sain 사인비구 제작 동종 - 강화동종 思印比丘 製作 銅鍾 - 江華銅鍾	Ganghwa County, Incheon	1963-01-21, 2000-02-15 번호 변경.	
12		Five-story Stone Pagoda at Dongsa Temple Site, Hanam 하남 동사지 오층석탑 河南 桐寺址 五層石塔	Hanam, Gyeonggi	1963-01-21, 2010-12-27 renamed	
13		Three-story Stone Pagoda at Dongsa Temple Site, Hanam 하남 동사지 삼층석탑 河南 桐寺址 三層石塔	Hanam, Gyeonggi	1963-01-21, 2010-12-27 renamed	
14		Stele for State Preceptor Jingak at Changseongsa Temple Site, Suwon 수원 창성사지 진각국사탑비 水原 彰聖寺址 眞覺國師塔碑	Suwon, Gyeonggi	1963-01-21, 2010-12-27 renamed	
15		Stone Lantern of the Four Guardian Kings at Beopjusa Temple, Boeun 보은 법주사 사천왕 석등 報恩 法住寺 四天王 石燈	Boeun County, North Chungcheong	1963-01-21, 2010-12-27 renamed	
16		Stele for State Preceptor Daeji at Eokjeongsa Temple Site, Chungju 충주 억정사지 대지국사탑비 忠州 億政寺址 大智國師塔碑	Chungju, North Chungcheong	1963-01-21, 2010-12-27 renamed	
17		Stele for Buddhist Monk Beopgyeong at Jeongtosa Temple Site, Chungju 충주 정토사지 법경대사탑비 忠州 淨土寺址 法鏡大師塔碑	Chungju, North Chungcheong	1963-01-21, 2010-12-27 renamed	
18		Nine-story Stone Pagoda in Seojeong-ri, Cheongyang 청양 서정리 구층석탑 靑陽 西亭里 九層石塔	Cheongyang County, South Chungcheong	1963-01-21, 2010-12-27 renamed	
19		Five-story Stone Pagoda at Seongjusa Temple Site, Boryeong 보령 성주사지 오층석탑 保寧 聖住寺址 五層石塔	Boryeong, South Chungcheong	1963-01-21, 2010-12-27 renamed	
20		Central Three-story Stone Pagoda at Seongjusa Temple Site, Boryeong 보령 성주사지 중앙 삼층석탑 保寧 聖住寺址 中央 三層石塔	Boryeong, South Chungcheong	1963-01-21, 2010-12-27 renamed	
21		Monument for Liu Renyuan of Tang China, Buyeo 부여 당 유인원 기공비 扶餘 唐 劉仁願 紀功碑	Buyeo County, South Chungcheong	1963-01-21	
22		Stone Pillar of Geumsansa Temple, Gimje 김제 금산사 노주 金堤 金山寺 露柱	Gimje, North Jeolla	1963-01-21, 2010-12-27 renamed	
23		Stone Lotus Pedestal of Geumsansa Temple, Gimje 김제 금산사 석련대 金堤 金山寺 石蓮臺	Gimje, North Jeolla	1963-01-21, 2010-12-27 renamed	
24		Stele for Royal Preceptor Hyedeok at Geumsansa Temple, Gimje 김제 금산사 혜덕왕사탑비 金堤 金山寺 慧德王師塔碑	Gimje, North Jeolla	1963-01-21, 2010-12-27 renamed	
25		Five-story Stone Pagoda of Geumsansa Temple, Gimje 김제 금산사 오층석탑 金堤 金山寺 五層石塔	Gimje, North Jeolla	1963-01-21, 2010-12-27 renamed	
26		Ordination Platform of Geumsansa Temple, Gimje 김제 금산사 금강계단 金堤 金山寺 金剛戒壇	Gimje, North Jeolla	1963-01-21, 2010-12-27 renamed	
27		Hexagonal Multi-story Stone Pagoda of Geumsansa Temple, Gimje 김제 금산사 육각 다층석탑 金堤 金山寺 六角 多層石塔	Gimje, North Jeolla	1963-01-21, 2010-12-27 renamed	
28		Flagpole Supports of Geumsansa Temple, Gimje 김제 금산사 당간지주 金堤 金山寺 幢竿支柱	Gimje, North Jeolla	1963-01-21, 2010-12-27 renamed	
29		Three-story Stone Pagoda at Simwonam Hermitage of Geumsansa Temple, Gimje 김제 금산사 심원암 삼층석탑 金堤 金山寺 深源庵 三層石塔	Gimje, North Jeolla	1963-01-21, 2010-12-27 renamed	
30		Five-story Stone Pagoda at Manboksa Temple Site, Namwon 남원 만복사지 오층석탑 南原 萬福寺址 五層石塔	Namwon, North Jeolla	1963-01-21, 2010-12-27 renamed	
31		Stone Pedestal at Manboksa Temple Site, Namwon 남원 만복사지 석조대좌 南原 萬福寺址 石造臺座	Namwon, North Jeolla	1963-01-21	
32		Flagpole Supports at Manboksa Temple Site, Namwon 남원 만복사지 당간지주 南原 萬福寺址 幢竿支柱	Namwon, North Jeolla	1963-01-21, 2010-12-27 renamed	
33		Stupa of Buddhist Monk Sucheol at Silsangsa Temple, Namwon 남원 실상사 수철화상탑 南原 實相寺 秀澈和尙塔	Namwon, North Jeolla	1963-01-21, 2010-12-27 renamed	
34		Stele for Buddhist Monk Sucheol at Silsangsa Temple, Namwon 남원 실상사 수철화상탑비 南原 實相寺 秀澈和尙塔碑	Namwon, North Jeolla	1963-01-21, 2010-12-27 renamed	
35		Stone Lantern of Silsangsa Temple, Namwon 남원 실상사 석등 南原 實相寺 石燈	Namwon, North Jeolla	1963-01-21, 2010-12-27 renamed	
36		Stupa of Silsangsa Temple, Namwon 남원 실상사 승탑 南原 實相寺 僧塔	Namwon, North Jeolla	1963-01-21, 2010-12-27 renamed	
37		East and West Three-story Stone Pagodas of Silsangsa Temple, Namwon 남원 실상사 동·서 삼층석탑 南原 實相寺 東·西 三層石塔	Namwon, North Jeolla	1963-01-21, 2010-12-27 renamed	
38		Stupa of Buddhist Monk Jeunggak at Silsangsa Temple, Namwon 남원 실상사 증각대사탑 南原 實相寺 證覺大師塔	Namwon, North Jeolla	1963-01-21, 2010-12-27 renamed	
39		Stele for Buddhist Monk Jeunggak at Silsangsa Temple, Namwon 남원 실상사 증각대사탑비 南原 實相寺 證覺大師塔碑	Namwon, North Jeolla	1963-01-21, 2010-12-27 renamed	
40		Stone Lantern at Baekjangam Hermitage of Silsangsa Temple, Namwon 남원 실상사 백장암 석등 南原 實相寺 百丈庵 石燈	Namwon, North Jeolla	1963-01-21, 2010-12-27 renamed	
41		Iron Seated Buddha of Silsangsa Temple, Namwon 남원 실상사 철조여래좌상 南原 實相寺 鐵造如來坐像	Namwon, North Jeolla	1963-01-21	
42		Stone Standing Buddha at Yongdamsa Temple Site, Namwon 남원 용담사지 석조여래입상 南原 龍潭寺址 石造如來立像	Namwon, North Jeolla	1963-01-21, 2010-08-25 renamed	
43		Stone Standing Buddha at Manboksa Temple Site, Namwon 남원 만복사지 석조여래입상 南原 萬福寺址 石造如來立像	Namwon, North Jeolla	1963-01-21, 2010-08-25 renamed	
~~44호~~		~~익산왕궁리오층석탑~~; ~~益山王宮里五層石塔~~	Iksan, North Jeolla	1963-01-21, made National Treasure No. 289	
45		Stone Seated Buddha in Yeondong-ri, Iksan 익산 연동리 석조여래좌상 益山 蓮洞里 石造如來坐像	Iksan, North Jeolla	1963-01-21, 2010-08-25 renamed	
46		Stone Standing Buddhas in Godo-ri, Iksan 익산 고도리 석조여래입상 益山 古都里 石造如來立像	Iksan, North Jeolla	1963-01-21, 2010-08-25 renamed	
47		West Three-story Stone Pagoda at Seongjusa Temple Site, Boryeong 보령 성주사지 서 삼층석탑 保寧 聖住寺址 西 三層石塔	Boryeong, South Chungcheong	1963-01-21, 2010-12-27 renamed	
~~48~~		~~대흥사북미륵암마애여래좌상~~; ~~大興寺北彌勒庵磨崖如來坐像~~	~~Haenam County, South Jeolla~~	1963-01-21, made National Treasure No. 308	
49		Stone Flagpole Outside the East Gate, Naju 나주 동점문 밖 석당간 羅州 東漸門 밖 石幢竿	Naju, South Jeolla	1963-01-21, 2010-12-27 renamed	
50		Three-story Stone Pagoda Outside the North Gate, Naju 나주 북망문 밖 삼층석탑 羅州 北望門 밖 三層石塔	Naju, South Jeolla	1963-01-21, 2010-12-27 renamed	
51		Three-story Stone Pagoda in Naehwa-ri, Mungyeong 문경 내화리 삼층석탑 聞慶 內化里 三層石塔	Mungyeong, North Gyeongsang	1963-01-21, 2010-12-27 renamed	
52		East and West Three-story Stone Pagodas in Seodong-ri, Bonghwa 봉화 서동리 동·서 삼층석탑 奉化 西洞里 東·西 三層石塔	Bonghwa County, North Gyeongsang	1963-01-21, 2010-12-27 renamed	
53		Five-story Stone Pagoda at Gaesimsa Temple Site, Yecheon 예천 개심사지 오층석탑 醴泉 開心寺址 五層石塔	Yecheon County, North Gyeongsang	1963-01-21, 2010-12-27 renamed	
54		Flagpole Supports in Jisan-ri, Goryeong 고령 지산리 당간지주 高靈 池山里 幢竿支柱	Goryeong County, North Gyeongsang	1963-01-21, 2010-12-27 renamed	
~~55~~		~~봉정사대웅전~~; ~~鳳停寺大雄殿~~	~~Andong, North Gyeongsang~~	1963-01-21, made National Treasure No. 311	
56		Five-story Brick Pagoda in Unheung-dong, Andong 안동 운흥동 오층전탑 安東 雲興洞 五層塼塔	Andong, North Gyeongsang	1963-01-21, 2010-12-27 renamed	
57		Five-story Brick Pagoda in Jotap-ri, Andong 안동 조탑리 오층전탑 安東 造塔里 五層塼塔	Andong, North Gyeongsang	1963-01-21, 2010-12-27 renamed	
58		Stone Seated Buddha in Angi-dong, Andong 안동 안기동 석조여래좌상 安東 安寄洞 石造如來坐像	Andong, North Gyeongsang	1963-01-21, 2010-08-25 renamed	
59		Flagpole Supports at Suksusa Temple Site, Yeongju 영주 숙수사지 당간지주 榮州 宿水寺址 幢竿支柱	Yeongju, North Gyeongsang	1963-01-21, 2010-12-27 renamed	
60		Stone Standing Buddha in Yeongju-dong, Yeongju 영주 영주동 석조여래입상 榮州 榮州洞 石造如來立像	Yeongju, North Gyeongsang	1963-01-21, 2010-08-25 renamed	
61		Stupa of Bulguksa Temple, Gyeongju 경주 불국사 사리탑 慶州 佛國寺 舍利塔	Gyeongju, North Gyeongsang	1963-01-21, 2010-12-27 renamed	
62		Rock-carved Standing Buddha Triad in Seoak-dong, Gyeongju 경주 서악동 마애여래삼존입상 慶州 西岳洞 磨崖如來三尊立像	Gyeongju, North Gyeongsang	1963-01-21, 2010-08-25 renamed	
63		Stone Standing Buddha Triad in Bae-dong, Gyeongju 경주 배동 석조여래삼존입상 慶州 拜洞 石造如來三尊立像	Gyeongju, North Gyeongsang	1963-01-21, 2010-08-25 renamed	
64		Stone Basin at Bomunsa Temple Site, Gyeongju 경주 보문사지 석조 慶州 普門寺址 石槽	Gyeongju, North Gyeongsang	1963-01-21, 2010-12-27 renamed	
65		Three-story Stone Pagoda in Seoak-dong, Gyeongju 경주 서악동 삼층석탑 慶州 西岳洞 三層石塔	Gyeongju, North Gyeongsang	1963-01-21, 2010-12-27 renamed	
66		Stone Ice Storage, Gyeongju 경주 석빙고 慶州 石氷庫	Gyeongju, North Gyeongsang	1963-01-21, 2010-12-27 renamed	
67		Three-story Stone Pagoda in Hyohyeon-dong, Gyeongju 경주 효현동 삼층석탑 慶州 孝峴洞 三層石塔	Gyeongju, North Gyeongsang	1963-01-21, 2010-12-27 renamed	
68		Stele of Son Si-yang for His Filial Devotion in Hwangnam-dong, Gyeongju 경주 황남동 효자 손시양 정려비 慶州 皇南洞 孝子 孫時揚 旌閭碑	Gyeongju, North Gyeongsang	1963-01-21, 2010-12-27 renamed	
69		Flagpole Supports at Mangdeoksa Temple Site, Gyeongju 경주 망덕사지 당간지주 慶州 望德寺址 幢竿支柱	Gyeongju, North Gyeongsang	1963-01-21, 2010-12-27 renamed	
70		Tortoise-shaped Pedestal in Seoak-dong, Gyeongju 경주 서악동 귀부 慶州 西岳洞 龜趺	Gyeongju, North Gyeongsang	1963-01-21, 2010-12-27 renamed	
71		Stone Buddha Triad in Daesan-ri, Haman 함안 대산리 석조삼존상 咸安 大山里 石造三尊像	Haman County, South Gyeongsang	1963-01-21, 2010-08-25 renamed	
72		East Three-story Stone Pagoda at Dansoksa Temple Site, Sancheong 산청 단속사지 동 삼층석탑 山淸 斷俗寺址 東 三層石塔	Sancheong County, South Gyeongsang	1963-01-21, 2010-12-27 renamed	
73		West Three-story Stone Pagoda at Dansoksa Temple Site, Sancheong 산청 단속사지 서 삼층석탑 山淸 斷俗寺址 西 三層石塔	Sancheong County, South Gyeongsang	1963-01-21, 2010-12-27 renamed	
74		Stone Boundary Marker of Tongdosa Temple, Yangsan 양산 통도사 국장생 석표 梁山 通度寺 國長生 石標	Yangsan, South Gyeongsang	1963-01-21, 2010-12-27 renamed	
75		Rock-carved Seated Buddha in Songhyeon-dong, Changnyeong 창녕 송현동 마애여래좌상 昌寧 松峴洞 磨崖如來坐像	Changnyeong County, South Gyeongsang	1963-01-21, 2010-08-25 renamed	
76		Flagpole Supports in Geunhwa-dong, Chuncheon 춘천 근화동 당간지주 春川 槿花洞 幢竿支柱	Chuncheon, Gangwon	1963-01-21, 2010-12-27 renamed	
77		Seven-story Stone Pagoda, Chuncheon 춘천 칠층석탑 春川 七層石塔	Chuncheon, Gangwon	1963-01-21, 2010-12-27 renamed	
78		Stele for State Preceptor Wongong at Geodonsa Temple Site, Wonju 원주 거돈사지 원공국사탑비 原州 居頓寺址 圓空國師塔碑	Wonju, Gangwon	1963-01-21, 2010-12-27 renamed	
79		Three-story Stone Pagoda in Huimang-ri, Hongcheon 홍천 희망리 삼층석탑 洪川 希望里 三層石塔	Hongcheon County, Gangwon	1963-01-21, 2010-12-27 renamed	
80		Flagpole Supports in Huimang-ri, Hongcheon 홍천 희망리 당간지주 洪川 希望里 幢竿支柱	Hongcheon County, Gangwon	1963-01-21, 2010-12-27 renamed	
81		Stone Seated Bodhisattva from Hansongsa Temple Site, Gangneung 강릉 한송사지 석조보살좌상 江陵 寒松寺址 石造菩薩坐像	Gangneung, Gangwon	1963-01-21, 2010-08-25 renamed	
82		Flagpole Supports in Daechang-ri, Gangneung 강릉 대창리 당간지주 江陵 大昌里 幢竿支柱	Gangneung, Gangwon	1963-01-21, 2010-12-27 renamed	
83		Flagpole Supports in Sumun-ri, Gangneung 강릉 수문리 당간지주 江陵 水門里 幢竿支柱	Gangneung, Gangwon	1963-01-21, 2010-12-27 renamed	
84		Stone Seated Bodhisattva at Sinboksa Temple Site, Gangneung 강릉 신복사지 석조보살좌상 江陵 神福寺址 石造菩薩坐像	Gangneung, Gangwon	1963-01-21, 2010-08-25 renamed	
85		Stupa at Gulsansa Temple Site, Gangneung 강릉 굴산사지 승탑 江陵 崛山寺址 僧塔	Gangneung, Gangwon	1963-01-21, 2010-12-27 renamed	
86		Flagpole Supports at Gulsansa Temple Site, Gangneung 강릉 굴산사지 당간지주 江陵 崛山寺址 幢竿支柱	Gangneung, Gangwon	1963-01-21, 2010-12-27 renamed	
87		Three-story Stone Pagoda at Sinboksa Temple Site, Gangneung 강릉 신복사지 삼층석탑 江陵 神福寺址 三層石塔	Gangneung, Gangwon	1963-01-21, 2010-12-27 renamed	
88		Bronze Bell with Inscription of "Tapsansa Temple" 탑산사명 동종 塔山寺銘 銅鍾	Haenam County, South Jeolla	1963-01-21	
89		Stone Seated Buddha of Dogapsa Temple, Yeongam 영암 도갑사 석조여래좌상 靈巖 道岬寺 石造如來坐像	Yeongam County, South Jeolla	1963-01-21, 2010-08-25 renamed	
90		대반열반경소 권9~10 大般湟槃經疏 卷九~十) (Commentary on the Maha parinirvana Sutra (The Nirvana Sutra), Volumes 9 and 10	Suncheon, South Jeolla	1963-01-21, 2010-08-25 renamed	
91		Three-story Stone Pagoda in Chang-ri, Yeoju 여주 창리 삼층석탑 驪州 倉里 三層石塔	Yeoju, Gyeonggi	1963-01-21, 2010-12-27 renamed	
92		Three-story Stone Pagoda in Ha-ri, Yeoju 여주 하리 삼층석탑 驪州 下里 三層石塔	Yeoju, Gyeonggi	1963-01-21, 2010-12-27 renamed	
93		Two Rock-carved Standing Buddhas in Yongmi-ri, Paju 파주 용미리 마애이불입상 坡州 龍尾里 磨崖二佛立像	Paju, Gyeonggi	1963-01-21, 2010-08-25 renamed	
94		Four Lion Nine-story Stone Pagoda at Sajabinsinsa Temple Site, Jecheon 제천 사자빈신사지 사사자 구층석탑 堤川 獅子頻迅寺址 四獅子 九層石塔	Jecheon, North Chungcheong	1963-01-21, 2010-12-27 renamed	
95		Five-story Stone Pagoda in Mireuk-ri, Chungju 충주 미륵리 오층석탑 忠州 彌勒里 五層石塔	Chungju, North Chungcheong	1963-01-21, 2010-12-27 renamed	
96		Stone Standing Buddha in Mireuk-ri, Chungju 충주 미륵리 석조여래입상 忠州 彌勒里 石造如來立像	Chungju, North Chungcheong	1963-01-21, 2010-08-25 renamed	
97		Two Rock-carved Seated Buddhas in Wonpung-ri, Goesan 괴산 원풍리 마애이불병좌상 槐山 院豊里 磨崖二佛並坐像	Goesan County, North Chungcheong	1963-01-21, 2010-08-25 renamed	
98		Iron Seated Buddha, Chungju 충주 철조여래좌상 忠州 鐵造如來坐像	Chungju, North Chungcheong	1963-01-21	
99		Flagpole Supports at Cheonheungsa Temple Site, Cheonan 천안 천흥사지 당간지주 天安 天興寺址 幢竿支柱	Cheonan, South Chungcheong	1963-01-21, 2010-12-27 renamed	
100		Stone Standing Buddha Triad at Anguksa Temple Site, Dangjin 당진 안국사지 석조여래삼존입상 唐津 安國寺址 石造如來三尊立像	Dangjin, South Chungcheong	1963-01-21, 2010-08-25 renamed	
101		Stone Pagoda at Anguksa Temple Site, Dangjin 당진 안국사지 석탑 唐津 安國寺址 石塔	Dangjin, South Chungcheong	1963-01-21, 2010-12-27 renamed	
102		Stone Basin at Bowonsa Temple Site, Seosan 서산 보원사지 석조 瑞山 普願寺址 石槽	Seosan, South Chungcheong	1963-01-21, 2010-12-27 renamed	
103		Flagpole Supports at Bowonsa Temple Site, Seosan 서산 보원사지 당간지주 瑞山 普願寺址 幢竿支柱	Seosan, South Chungcheong	1963-01-21, 2010-12-27 renamed	
104		Five-story Stone Pagoda at Bowonsa Temple Site, Seosan 서산 보원사지 오층석탑 瑞山 普願寺址 五層石塔	Seosan, South Chungcheong	1963-01-21, 2010-12-27 renamed	
105		Stupa of State Preceptor Beopin at Bowonsa Temple Site, Seosan 서산 보원사지 법인국사탑 瑞山 普願寺址 法印國師塔	Seosan, South Chungcheong	1963-01-21, 2010-12-27 renamed	
106		Stele for State Preceptor Beopin at Bowonsa Temple Site, Seosan 서산 보원사지 법인국사탑비 瑞山 普願寺址 法印國師塔碑	Seosan, South Chungcheong	1963-01-21, 2010-12-27 renamed	
107		Stele for Great Master Bogwang from Bogwangsa Temple Site, Buyeo 부여 보광사지 대보광선사비 扶餘 普光寺址 大普光禪師碑	Buyeo County, South Chungcheong	1963-01-21, 2010-12-27 renamed	
108		Stone Seated Buddha at Jeongnimsa Temple Site, Buyeo 부여 정림사지 석조여래좌상 扶餘 定林寺址 石造如來坐像	Buyeo County, South Chungcheong	1963-01-21, 2010-08-25 renamed	
109		Five-story Stone Pagoda at Seonggeosa Temple Site, Gwangju (Presumed) 전 광주 성거사지 오층석탑 (傳)光州 聖居寺址 五層石塔	Nam District, Gwangju	1963-01-21, 2010-12-27 renamed	
110		Five-story Stone Pagoda in Jisan-dong, Gwangju 광주 지산동 오층석탑 光州 芝山洞 五層石塔	Dong District, Gwangju	1963-01-21, 2010-12-27 renamed	
111		Stone Lantern at Gaeseonsa Temple Site, Damyang 담양 개선사지 석등 潭陽 開仙寺址 石燈	Damyang County, South Jeolla	1963-01-21, 2010-12-27 renamed	
112		Three-story Stone Pagoda of Jungheungsanseong Fortress, Gwangyang 광양 중흥산성 삼층석탑 光陽 中興山城 三層石塔	Gwangyang, South Jeolla	1963-01-21, 2010-12-27 renamed	
113		Three-story Stone Pagoda in Bonggi-ri, Cheongdo 청도 봉기리 삼층석탑 淸道 鳳岐里 三層石塔	Cheongdo County, North Gyeongsang	1963-01-21, 2010-12-27 renamed	
114		Three-story Stone Pagoda in Pyeonghwa-dong, Andong 안동 평화동 삼층석탑 安東 平和洞 三層石塔	Andong, North Gyeongsang	1963-01-21, 2010-12-27 renamed	
115		Three-story Stone Pagoda in Pyeonghwa-dong, Andong 안동 이천동 마애여래입상 安東 泥川洞 磨崖如來立像	Andong, North Gyeongsang	1963-01-21, 2010-08-25 renamed	
116		Stone Standing Buddha in Seokgyo-ri, Yeongju 영주 석교리 석조여래입상 榮州 石橋里 石造如來立像	Yeongju, North Gyeongsang	1963-01-21, 2010-08-25 renamed	
117		Three-story Stone Pagoda in Hwadal-ri, Sangju 상주 화달리 삼층석탑 尙州 化達里 三層石塔	Sangju, North Gyeongsang	1963-01-21, 2010-12-27 renamed	
118		Three-story Stone Pagoda in Hwadal-ri, Sangju 상주 증촌리 석조여래입상 尙州 曾村里 石造如來立像	Sangju, North Gyeongsang	1963-01-21, 2010-08-25 renamed	
119		Stone Seated Buddha in Bogyong-dong, Sangju 상주 복용동 석조여래좌상 尙州 伏龍洞 石造如來坐像	Sangju, North Gyeongsang	1963-01-21, 2010-08-25 renamed	
120		Stone Seated Buddha in Jeungchon-ri, Sangju 상주 증촌리 석조여래좌상 尙州 曾村里 石造如來坐像	Sangju, North Gyeongsang	1963-01-21, 2010-08-25 renamed	
121		Stone Buddhas in Four Directions at Gulbulsa Temple Site, Gyeongju 경주 굴불사지 석조사면불상 慶州 掘佛寺址 石造四面佛像	Gyeongju, North Gyeongsang	1963-01-21, 2010-08-25 renamed	
122		Rock-carved Standing Buddha Triad in Yul-dong, Gyeongju 경주 율동 마애여래삼존입상 慶州 栗洞 磨崖如來三尊立像	Gyeongju, North Gyeongsang	1963-01-21, 2010-08-25 renamed	
123		Flagpole Supports at Bomunsa Temple Site, Gyeongju 경주 보문사지 당간지주 慶州 普門寺址 幢竿支柱	Gyeongju, North Gyeongsang	1963-01-21, 2010-12-27 renamed	
124		East and West Three-story Stone Pagodas in Namsan-dong, Gyeongju 경주 남산동 동·서 삼층석탑 慶州 南山洞 東·西 三層石塔	Gyeongju, North Gyeongsang	1963-01-21, 2010-12-27 renamed	
125		Stele for the Construction of Amitabha Buddha at Mujangsa Temple Site, Gyeongju 경주 무장사지 아미타불 조상 사적비 慶州 鍪藏寺址 阿彌陀佛 造像 事蹟碑	Gyeongju, North Gyeongsang	1963-01-21, 2010-12-27 renamed	
126		Three-story Stone Pagoda at Mujangsa Temple Site, Gyeongju 경주 무장사지 삼층석탑 慶州 鍪藏寺址 三層石塔	Gyeongju, North Gyeongsang	1963-01-21, 2010-12-27 renamed	
127		Flagpole Supports at Samnangsa Temple Site, Gyeongju 경주 삼랑사지 당간지주 慶州 三郞寺址 幢竿支柱	Gyeongju, North Gyeongsang	1963-01-21, 2010-12-27 renamed	
128		Stele for Royal Preceptor Wongyeong from Banyasa Temple Site, Hapcheon 합천 반야사지 원경왕사비 陜川 般若寺址 元景王師碑	Hapcheon County, South Gyeongsang	1963-01-21	
129		East and West Three-story Stone Pagodas at Wolgwangsa Temple Site, Hapcheon 합천 월광사지 동·서 삼층석탑 陜川 月光寺址 東·西 三層石塔	Hapcheon County, South Gyeongsang	1963-01-21, 2010-12-27 renamed	
~~130~~		~~Yonggam sugyeong (The Handy Mirror in the Dragon Shrine), Volumes 3 and 4~~; ~~용감수경<제3권,4권>~~; ~~龍龕手鏡<第三卷,四卷>~~	~~Seongbuk District, Seoul~~	1963-01-21, 1997-01-01 removed, made National Treasure No. 291	
131		Iron Seated Vairocana Buddha of Jeungsimsa Temple, Gwangju 광주 증심사 철조비로자나불좌상 光州 證心寺 鐵造毘盧遮那佛坐像	Dong District, Gwangju	1963-01-21	
132		East Five-story Stone Pagoda of Hwaeomsa Temple, Gurye 구례 화엄사 동 오층석탑 求禮 華嚴寺 東 五層石塔	Gurye County, South Jeolla	1963-01-21, 2010-12-27 renamed	
133		West Five-story Stone Pagoda of Hwaeomsa Temple, Gurye 구례 화엄사 서 오층석탑 求禮 華嚴寺 西 五層石塔	Gurye County, South Jeolla	1963-01-21, 2010-12-27 renamed	
134		Sutra Wrapper of Songgwangsa Temple, Suncheon 순천 송광사 경질 順天 松廣寺 經帙	Suncheon, South Jeolla	1963-01-21	
135		Stupa with Lotus, Cloud and Dragon Design in Relief in Sangyeok-dong, Daegu 대구 산격동 연화 운룡장식 승탑 大邱 山格洞 蓮花 雲龍裝飾 僧塔	Buk District, Daegu	1963-01-21, 2010-12-27 renamed	
136		Stone Seated Buddha in Mireukgok Valley of Namsan Mountain, Gyeongju 경주 남산 미륵곡 석조여래좌상 慶州 南山 彌勒谷 石造如來坐像	Gyeongju, North Gyeongsang	1963-01-21, 2010-08-25 renamed	
137		Stupa of Buddhist Monk Jijeung at Bongamsa Temple, Mungyeong 문경 봉암사 지증대사탑 聞慶 鳳巖寺 智證大師塔	Mungyeong, North Gyeongsang	1963-01-21, 2010-12-27 renamed	
~~138~~		~~봉암사지증대사적조탑비~~; ~~鳳巖寺智證大師寂照塔碑~~	~~Mungyeong, North Gyeongsang~~	1963-01-21, 2010-01-04 removed, made National Treasure No. 315	
~~139~~		~~Stone Seated Bodhisattva of Woljeongsa Temple, Pyeongchang~~; ~~평창 월정사 석조보살좌상~~; ~~平昌 月精寺 石造菩薩坐像~~	~~Pyeongchang County, Gangwon~~	1963-01-21, 2010-08-25 renamed, 2017-01-02 removed, made National Treasure No. 48-2	
~~140~~		~~오대산상원사중창권선문~~; ~~五臺山上院寺重創勸善文~~	~~Pyeongchang County, Gangwon~~	1963-01-21, 1997-01-01 removed, made National Treasure No. 292	
141		Munmyo Confucian Shrine and Seonggyungwan National Academy, Seoul <Daeseongjeon Shrine, Dongmu and Seomu Shrines, Main Gate, and Myeongnyundang Lecture Hall 서울 문묘 및 성균관 서울 文廟 및 成均館<大成殿·東廡·西廡·三門·明倫堂>	Jongno District, Seoul	1963-01-21	
142		Donggwanwangmyo Shrine, Seoul 서울 동관왕묘 서울 東關王廟	Jongno District, Seoul	1963-01-21	
143		Daeungjeon Hall of Gaesimsa Temple, Seosan 서산 개심사 대웅전 瑞山 開心寺 大雄殿	Seosan, South Chungcheong	1963-01-21	
~~144~~		~~통도사대웅전~~; ~~通度寺大雄殿~~	~~Yangsan, South Gyeongsang~~	1963-01-21, 1997-01-01 removed, made National Treasure No. 290	
~~145~~		~~Daejangjeon Hall of Yongmunsa Temple, Yecheon~~; ~~예천 용문사 대장전~~; ~~醴泉 龍門寺 大藏殿~~	~~Yecheon County, North Gyeongsang~~	1963-01-21, 2019-12-02 removed, made National Treasure No. 328	
146		Yaksajeon Hall of Gwallyongsa Temple, Changnyeong 창녕 관룡사 약사전 昌寧 觀龍寺 藥師殿	Changnyeong County, South Gyeongsang	1963-01-21	
~~147호~~		~~Yeongnamnu Pavilion, Miryang~~; ~~밀양 영남루~~; ~~密陽 嶺南樓~~	~~Miryang, South Gyeongsang~~	1963-01-21, 2023-12-28 removed	
148		Stone Basin in Jung-dong, Gongju 공주 중동 석조 公州 中洞 石槽	Gongju, South Chungcheong	1963-01-21, 2010-12-27 renamed	
149		Stone Basin in Banjuk-dong, Gongju 공주 반죽동 석조 公州 班竹洞 石槽	Gongju, South Chungcheong	1963-01-21, 2010-12-27 renamed	
150		Flagpole Supports in Banjuk-dong, Gongju 공주 반죽동 당간지주 公州 班竹洞 幢竿支柱	Gongju, South Chungcheong	1963-01-21, 2010-12-27 renamed	
151		Three-story Stone Pagoda of Yeongoksa Temple, Gurye 구례 연곡사 삼층석탑 求禮 鷰谷寺 三層石塔	Gurye County, South Jeolla	1963-01-21, 2010-12-27 renamed	
152		Stele for Master Hyeongak at Yeongoksa Temple, Gurye 구례 연곡사 현각선사탑비 求禮 鷰谷寺 玄覺禪師塔碑	Gurye County, South Jeolla	1963-01-21, 2010-12-27 renamed	
153		East Stele of Yeongoksa Temple, Gurye 구례 연곡사 동 승탑비 求禮 鷰谷寺 東 僧塔碑	Gurye County, South Jeolla	1963-01-21, 2010-12-27 renamed	
154		Stupa of Buddhist Monk Soyo at Yeongoksa Temple, Gurye 구례 연곡사 소요대사탑 求禮 鷰谷寺 逍遙大師塔	Gurye County, South Jeolla	1963-01-21, 2010-12-27 renamed	
155		East Stupa of Borimsa Temple, Jangheung 장흥 보림사 동 승탑 長興 寶林寺 東 僧塔	Jangheung County, South Jeolla	1963-01-21, 2010-12-27 renamed	
156		West Stupa of Borimsa Temple, Jangheung 장흥 보림사 서 승탑 長興 寶林寺 西 僧塔	Jangheung County, South Jeolla	1963-01-21, 2010-12-27 renamed	
157		Stupa of Master Bojo at Borimsa Temple, Jangheung 장흥 보림사 보조선사탑 長興 寶林寺 普照禪師塔	Jangheung County, South Jeolla	1963-01-21, 2010-12-27 renamed	
158		Stele for Master Bojo at Borimsa Temple, Jangheung 장흥 보림사 보조선사탑비 長興 寶林寺 普照禪師塔碑	Jangheung County, South Jeolla	1963-01-21, 2010-12-27 renamed	
159		Rock-carved Standing Bhaisajyaguru Buddha Triad in Bangeosan Mountain, Haman 함안 방어산 마애약사여래삼존입상 咸安 防禦山 磨崖藥師如來三尊立像	Haman County, South Gyeongsang	1963-01-21, 2010-08-25 renamed	
160		Documents of Ryu Seong-ryong's Family 유성룡 종가 문적 柳成龍 宗家 文籍	Andong, North Gyeongsang	1963-01-21	
161		Main Buddha Hall of Jeongsusa Temple, Ganghwa 강화 정수사 법당 江華 淨水寺 法堂	Ganghwa County, Incheon	1963-01-21	
162		Upper Daeungjeon Hall of Janggoksa Temple, Cheongyang 청양 장곡사 상 대웅전 靑陽 長谷寺 上 大雄殿	Cheongyang County, South Chungcheong	1963-01-21	
~~163~~		~~쌍봉사대웅전~~; ~~雙峰寺大雄殿~~	~~Hwasun County, South Jeolla~~	1963-01-21, 1984-05-30 removed, 1984-04-30 화재로 소실	
164		Hoejeonmun Gate of Cheongpyeongsa Temple, Chuncheon 춘천 청평사 회전문 春川 淸平寺 廻轉門	Chuncheon, Gangwon	1963-01-21	
165		Ojukheon House, Gangneung 강릉 오죽헌 江陵 烏竹軒	Gangneung, Gangwon	1963-01-21	
166		Five-story Stone Pagoda from Hongje-dong, Seoul 서울 홍제동 오층석탑 서울 弘濟洞 五層石塔	Yongsan District, Seoul	1963-01-21, 2010-12-27 renamed	
167		Three-story Stone Pagoda in Eunseon-ri, Jeongeup 정읍 은선리 삼층석탑 井邑 隱仙里 三層石塔	Jeongeup, North Jeolla	1963-01-21, 2010-12-27 renamed	
168		East and West Three-story Stone Pagodas in Cheongun-dong, Gyeongju 경주 천군동 동·서 삼층석탑 慶州 千軍洞 東·西 三層石塔	Gyeongju, North Gyeongsang	1963-01-21, 2010-12-27 renamed	
169		Three-story Stone Pagoda of Bongamsa Temple, Mungyeong 문경 봉암사 삼층석탑 聞慶 鳳巖寺 三層石塔	Mungyeong, North Gyeongsang	1963-01-21, 2010-12-27 renamed	
170		Stele for Master Cheolgam at Ssangbongsa Temple, Hwasun 화순 쌍봉사 철감선사탑비 和順 雙峯寺 澈鑒禪師塔碑	Hwasun County, South Jeolla	1963-01-21, 2010-12-27 renamed	
171		Stupa of Buddhist Monk Jeongjin at Bongamsa Temple, Mungyeong 문경 봉암사 정진대사탑 聞慶 鳳巖寺 靜眞大師塔	Mungyeong, North Gyeongsang	1963-01-21, 2010-12-27 renamed	
172		Stele for Buddhist Monk Jeongjin at Bongamsa Temple, Mungyeong 문경 봉암사 정진대사탑비 聞慶 鳳巖寺 靜眞大師塔碑	Mungyeong, North Gyeongsang	1963-01-21, 2010-12-27 renamed	
173		Stupa at Manghaesa Temple Site, Ulju 울주 망해사지 승탑 蔚州 望海寺址 僧塔	Ulju County, Ulsan	1963-01-21, 2010-12-27 renamed	
174		Iron Seated Vairocana Buddha and Stone Pedestal of Janggoksa Temple, Cheongyang 청양 장곡사 철조비로자나불좌상 및 석조대좌 靑陽 長谷寺 鐵造毘盧遮那佛坐像 및 石造臺座	Cheongyang County, South Chungcheong	1963-01-21	
175		Sutra Plaques of Songgwangsa Temple, Suncheon 순천 송광사 경패 順天 松廣寺 經牌	Suncheon, South Jeolla	1963-01-21	
176		Gilt-bronze Handbell of Songgwangsa Temple, Suncheon 순천 송광사 금동 요령 順天 松廣寺 金銅搖鈴	Suncheon, South Jeolla	1963-01-21	
177		Main Gate of Sajikdan Altar 사직단 대문 社稷壇 大門	Jongno District, Seoul	1963-01-21	
178		Daeungjeon Hall of Jeondeungsa Temple, Ganghwa 강화 전등사 대웅전 江華 傳燈寺 大雄殿	Ganghwa County, Incheon	1963-01-21	
179		Yaksajeon Hall of Jeondeungsa Temple, Ganghwa 강화 전등사 약사전 江華 傳燈寺 藥師殿	Ganghwa County, Incheon	1963-01-21	
180		Josadang Shrine of Silleuksa Temple, Yeoju 여주 신륵사 조사당 驪州 神勒寺 祖師堂	Yeoju, Gyeonggi	1963-01-21	
181		Lower Daeungjeon Hall of Janggoksa Temple, Cheongyang 청양 장곡사 하 대웅전 靑陽 長谷寺 下 大雄殿	Cheongyang County, South Chungcheong	1963-01-21	
182		Imcheonggak House, Andong 안동 임청각 安東 臨淸閣	Andong, North Gyeongsang	1963-01-21, 2002-09-25 문화재명칭 변경	
183		Haeunjeong Pavilion, Gangneung 강릉 해운정 江陵 海雲亭	Gangneung, Gangwon	1963-01-21	
184		Three-story Stone Pagoda in Jangha-ri, Buyeo 부여 장하리 삼층석탑 扶餘 長蝦里 三層石塔	Buyeo County, South Chungcheong	1963-01-21, 2010-12-27 renamed	
185		Five-story Stone Pagoda of Muryangsa Temple, Buyeo 부여 무량사 오층석탑 扶餘 無量寺 五層石塔	Buyeo County, South Chungcheong	1963-01-21, 2010-12-27 renamed	
186		Three-story Stone Pagoda in Yongjangsagok Valley of Namsan Mountain, Gyeongju 경주 남산 용장사곡 삼층석탑 慶州 南山 茸長寺谷 三層石塔	Gyeongju, North Gyeongsang	1963-01-21, 2010-12-27 renamed	
187		Stone Seated Buddha in Yongjangsagok Valley of Namsan Mountain, Gyeongju 경주 남산 용장사곡 석조여래좌상 慶州 南山 茸長寺谷 石造如來坐像	Gyeongju, North Gyeongsang	1963-01-21, 2010-08-25 renamed	
188		Three-story Stone Pagoda in Gwandeok-ri, Uiseong 의성 관덕리 삼층석탑 義城 觀德里 三層石塔	Uiseong County, North Gyeongsang	1963-01-21	
189		Five-story Brick Pagoda of Songnimsa Temple, Chilgok 칠곡 송림사 오층전탑 漆谷 松林寺 五層塼塔	Chilgok County, North Gyeongsang	1963-01-21, 2010-12-27 renamed	
190		Stupa of State Preceptor Wongong from Geodonsa Temple Site, Wonju 원주 거돈사지 원공국사탑 原州 居頓寺址 圓空國師塔	Yongsan District, Seoul	1963-01-21, 2010-12-27 renamed	
191		Stupa of Buddhist Monk Nangwon at Bohyeonsa Temple, Gangneung 강릉 보현사 낭원대사탑 江陵 普賢寺 朗圓大師塔	Gangneung, Gangwon	1963-01-21, 2010-12-27 renamed	
192		Stele for Buddhist Monk Nangwon at Bohyeonsa Temple, Gangneung 강릉 보현사 낭원대사탑비 江陵 普賢寺 朗圓大師塔碑	Gangneung, Gangwon	1963-01-21, 2010-12-27 renamed	
193		Stone Lantern at Geumdang Hall of Unmunsa Temple, Cheongdo 청도 운문사 금당 앞 석등 淸道 雲門寺 金堂 앞 石燈	Cheongdo County, North Gyeongsang	1963-01-21, 2010-12-27 renamed	
194		Stone Basin, Buyeo 부여 석조 扶餘 石槽	Buyeo County, South Chungcheong	1963-01-21, 2010-12-27 renamed	
~~195~~		~~금동관세음보살입상~~; ~~金銅觀世音菩薩立像~~	~~Jongno District, Seoul~~	1963-01-21, 1997-01-01 removed, made National Treasure No. 293	
196		Gilt-bronze Standing Sakyamuni Buddha Triad with Inscription of "Jeong Ji-won" 금동정지원명석가여래삼존입상 金銅鄭智遠銘釋迦如來三尊立像	Buyeo County, South Chungcheong	1963-01-21	
197		Stone Standing Buddha Triad in Eumnae-ri, Cheongyang 청양 읍내리 석조여래삼존입상 靑陽 邑內里 石造如來三尊立像	Cheongyang County, South Chungcheong	1963-01-21, 2010-08-25 renamed	
198		Rock-carved Seated Buddha in Bulgok Valley of Namsan Mountain, Gyeongju 경주 남산 불곡 마애여래좌상 慶州 南山 佛谷 磨崖如來坐像	Gyeongju, North Gyeongsang	1963-01-21, 2010-08-25 renamed	
199		Rock-carved Bodhisattva at Sinseonam Hermitage in Namsan Mountain, Gyeongju 경주 남산 신선암 마애보살반가상 慶州 南山 神仙庵 磨崖菩薩半跏像	Gyeongju, North Gyeongsang	1963-01-21	
~~200~~		~~경주남산칠불암마애석불~~; ~~慶州南山七佛庵磨崖石佛~~	~~Gyeongju, North Gyeongsang~~	1963-01-21, 2009-09-02 removed, made National Treasure No. 312	
201		Rock-carved Buddhas in Tapgok Valley of Namsan Mountain, Gyeongju 경주 남산 탑곡 마애불상군 慶州 南山 塔谷 磨崖佛像群	Gyeongju, North Gyeongsang	1963-01-21, 2010-08-25 renamed	
202		Stone Lions from Gwandeok-dong, Uiseong 의성 관덕동 석사자 義城 觀德洞 石獅子	Suseong District, Daegu	1963-01-21, 2010-12-27 renamed	
203		Stone Seated Buddha in Bakgok-ri, Cheongdo 청도 박곡리 석조여래좌상 淸道 珀谷里 石造如來坐像	Cheongdo County, North Gyeongsang	1963-01-21, 2010-08-25 renamed	
204		Saddharmapundarika Sutra (The Lotus Sutra) 묘법연화경관세음보살보문품삼현원찬과문 妙法蓮華經觀世音菩薩普門品三玄圓贊科文	Suncheon, South Jeolla	1963-01-21, 2010-08-25 renamed	
205		Commentary on the Mahayana abhidharma samucchaya vyakhya (Collection of the Mahayana Abhidharma), Volumes 13 and 14 대승아비달마잡집론소 권13~14 大乘阿毗達磨雜集論䟽 卷十三~十四	Suncheon, South Jeolla	1963-01-21, 2010-08-25 renamed	
206		Annotated Saddharmapundarika Sutra (The Lotus Sutra), Volumes 1 and 2 묘법연화경찬술 권1~2 妙法蓮華經纘述 卷一~二	Suncheon, South Jeolla	1963-01-21, 2010-08-25 renamed	
207		Commentary on the Vajracchedika prajnaparamita Sutra (The Diamond Sutra), Volumes 4 and 5 금강반야경소개현초 권4~5 金剛般若經?開玄抄 卷四~五	Suncheon, South Jeolla	1963-01-21, 2010-08-25 renamed	
208		Bronze Jar of Unmunsa Temple, Cheongdo 청도 운문사 동호 淸道 雲門寺 銅壺	Cheongdo County, North Gyeongsang	1963-01-21	
209		Dongchundang Hall in Hoedeok, Daejeon 대전 회덕 동춘당 大田 懷德 同春堂	Daedeok District, Daejeon	1963-01-21	
210		Jeongyodang Lecture Hall of Dosanseowon Confucian Academy, Andong 안동 도산서원 전교당 安東 陶山書院 典敎堂	Andong, North Gyeongsang	1963-01-21	
211		Sangdeoksa Shrine and Main Gate of Dosanseowon Confucian Academy, Andong 안동 도산서원 상덕사 및 삼문 安東 陶山書院 尙德祠 및 三門	Andong, North Gyeongsang	1963-01-21	
212		Daeungjeon Hall of Gwallyongsa Temple, Changnyeong 창녕 관룡사 대웅전 昌寧 觀龍寺 大雄殿	Changnyeong County, South Gyeongsang	1963-01-21	
~~213호~~		~~Jukseoru Pavilion, Samcheok~~; ~~삼척 죽서루~~; ~~三陟 竹西樓~~	~~Samcheok, Gangwon~~	~~1963-01-21~~	
214		Daeseongjeon Shrine of Gangneunghyanggyo Local Confucian School 강릉향교 대성전 江陵鄕校 大成殿	Gangneung, Gangwon	1963-01-21	
215		Rock-carved Seated Buddha in Bukhansan Mountain, Gugi-dong, Seoul 서울 북한산 구기동 마애여래좌상 서울 北漢山 舊基洞 磨崖如來坐像	Jongno District, Seoul	1963-01-21, 2010-08-25 renamed	
216		Rock-carved Seated Buddha of Beopjusa Temple, Boeun 보은 법주사 마애여래의좌상 報恩 法住寺 磨崖如來倚坐像	Boeun County, North Chungcheong	1963-01-21, 2010-08-25 renamed	
217		Stone Standing Maitreya Bodhisattva of Daejosa Temple, Buyeo 부여 대조사 석조미륵보살입상 扶餘 大鳥寺 石造彌勒菩薩立像	Buyeo County, South Chungcheong	1963-01-21, 2010-08-25 renamed	
~~218~~		~~Stone Standing Maitreya Bodhisattva of Gwanchoksa Temple, Nonsan~~; ~~논산 관촉사 석조미륵보살입상~~; ~~論山 灌燭寺 石造彌勒菩薩立像~~	~~Nonsan, South Chungcheong~~	1963-01-21, 2010-08-25 renamed, 2018-04-20, made National Treasure No. 323	
219		Stone Standing Buddha Triad at Gaetaesa Temple Site, Nonsan 논산 개태사지 석조여래삼존입상 論山 開泰寺址 石造如來三尊立像	Nonsan, South Chungcheong	1963-01-21, 2010-08-25 renamed	
220-1		Stone Seated Buddhas in Bukji-ri, Yeongju 영주 북지리 석조여래좌상 榮州 北枝里 石造如來坐像	Yeongju, North Gyeongsang	1963-01-21, 2010-08-25 번호 변경	
220-2		Stone Seated Buddhas in Bukji-ri, Yeongju 영주 북지리 석조여래좌상 榮州 北枝里 石造如來坐像	Yeongju, North Gyeongsang	1963-01-21, 2010-08-25 번호 변경	
221		Rock-carved Buddha Triad and Seated Buddha in Gaheung-dong, Yeongju 영주 가흥동 마애여래삼존상 및 여래좌상 榮州 可興洞 磨崖如來三尊像 및 如來坐像	Yeongju, North Gyeongsang	1963-01-21, 2010-08-25 renamed, 2008-08-28 추가지정	
222		Rock-carved Standing Buddha in Chiin-ri, Hapcheon 합천 치인리 마애여래입상 陜川 緇仁里 磨崖如來立像	Hapcheon County, South Gyeongsang	1963-01-21, 2010-08-25 renamed	
223		Three-story Stone Pagoda of Dopiansa Temple, Cheorwon 철원 도피안사 삼층석탑 鐵原 到彼岸寺 三層石塔	Cheorwon County, Gangwon	1963-01-21, 2010-12-27 renamed	
224		Five-story Stone Pagoda in Seongbuk-ri, Seocheon 서천 성북리 오층석탑 舒川 城北里 五層石塔	Seocheon County, South Chungcheong	1963-01-21, 2010-12-27 renamed	
225		Multi-story Stone Pagoda of Silleuksa Temple, Yeoju 여주 신륵사 다층석탑 驪州 神勒寺 多層石塔	Yeoju, Gyeonggi	1963-01-21, 2010-12-27 renamed	
226		Multi-story Brick Pagoda of Silleuksa Temple, Yeoju 여주 신륵사 다층전탑 驪州 神勒寺 多層塼塔	Yeoju, Gyeonggi	1963-01-21, 2010-12-27 renamed	
227		Stele for the Construction of Inyangsa Temple, Changnyeong 창녕 인양사 조성비 昌寧 仁陽寺 造成碑	Changnyeong County, South Gyeongsang	1963-01-21, 2010-12-27 renamed	
228		Bell-shaped Stupa of Buddhist Monk Boje at Silleuksa Temple, Yeoju 여주 신륵사 보제존자석종 驪州 神勒寺 普濟尊者石鍾	Yeoju, Gyeonggi	1963-01-21, 2010-12-27 renamed	
229		Stele for Buddhist Monk Boje at Silleuksa Temple, Yeoju 여주 신륵사 보제존자석종비 驪州 神勒寺 普濟尊者石鍾碑	Yeoju, Gyeonggi	1963-01-21, 2010-12-27 renamed	
230		Stele for the Construction of Daejanggak Depositories of Silleuksa Temple, Yeoju 여주 신륵사 대장각기비 驪州 神勒寺 大藏閣記碑	Yeoju, Gyeonggi	1963-01-21, 2010-12-27 renamed	
231		Stone Lantern in Front of the Stupa of Buddhist Monk Boje at Silleuksa Temple, Yeoju 여주 신륵사 보제존자석종 앞 석등 驪州 神勒寺 普濟尊者石鍾 앞 石燈	Yeoju, Gyeonggi	1963-01-21, 2010-12-27 renamed	
232		Stone Lantern of Gwanchoksa Temple, Nonsan 논산 관촉사 석등 論山 灌燭寺 石燈	Nonsan, South Chungcheong	1963-01-21, 2010-12-27 renamed	
233		Stone Lantern of Muryangsa Temple, Buyeo 부여 무량사 석등 扶餘 無量寺 石燈	Buyeo County, South Chungcheong	1963-01-21, 2010-12-27 renamed	
234		Stone Lantern in Balsan-ri, Gunsan 군산 발산리 석등 群山 鉢山里 石燈	Gunsan, North Jeolla	1963-01-21, 2010-12-27 renamed	
235		Flagpole Supports at Janguisa Temple Site, Seoul 서울 장의사지 당간지주 서울 莊義寺址 幢竿支柱	Jongno District, Seoul	1963-01-21, 2010-12-27 renamed	
236		Flagpole Supports at Mireuksa Temple Site, Iksan 익산 미륵사지 당간지주 益山 彌勒寺址 幢竿支柱	Iksan, North Jeolla	1963-01-21, 2010-12-27 renamed	
~~237~~		~~Celadon Jar with Inscription of "the Fourth Sunhwa Year"~~; ~~청자 순화4년명 항아리~~; ~~靑磁 淳化四年銘 壺~~	~~Seodaemun District, Seoul~~	1963-01-21, 2019-05-02 removed made National Treasure No. 326	
238		White Porcelain Incense Burner with a Lid in the Shape of Baksan Mountain 백자 박산형뚜껑 향로 白磁 博山形蓋 香爐	Seongbuk District, Seoul	1963-01-21	
239		Buncheong Prunus Vase with Inlaid Peony Design 분청사기 상감모란문 매병 粉靑沙器 象嵌牡丹文 梅甁	Gyeongsan, North Gyeongsang	1963-01-21	
240		White Porcelain Jar with Openwork Peony and Scroll Design in Underglaze Cobalt Blue 백자 청화투각모란당초문 항아리 白磁 靑畵透刻牡丹唐草文 立壺	Yongsan District, Seoul	1963-01-21	
~~241~~		~~청화백자철사진사국화문병~~; ~~靑華白磁鐵砂辰砂菊花文甁~~	~~Seongbuk District, Seoul~~	1963-01-21, made National Treasure No. 294	
242		Wontongjeon Hall of Gaemoksa Temple, Andong 안동 개목사 원통전 安東 開目寺 圓通殿	Andong, North Gyeongsang	1963-01-21	
243		Rock-carved Seated Buddha of Donghwasa Temple, Daegu 대구 동화사 마애여래좌상 大邱 桐華寺 磨崖如來坐像	Dong District, Daegu	1963-01-21, 2010-08-25 renamed	
244		Stone Seated Vairocana Buddha at Biroam Hermitage of Donghwasa Temple, Daegu 대구 동화사 비로암 석조비로자나불좌상 大邱 桐華寺 毘盧庵 石造毘盧遮那佛坐像	Dong District, Daegu	1963-01-21, 2010-08-25 renamed	
245		Stone Seated Buddha at Galhangsa Temple Site, Gimcheon 김천 갈항사지 석조여래좌상 金泉 葛項寺址 石造如來坐像	Gimcheon, North Gyeongsang	1963-01-21, 2010-08-25 renamed	
246		Stone Seated Buddha of Gounsa Temple, Uiseong 의성 고운사 석조여래좌상 義城 孤雲寺 石造如來坐像	Uiseong County, North Gyeongsang	1963-01-21, 2010-08-25 renamed	
247		Three-story Stone Pagoda at Biroam Hermitage of Donghwasa Temple, Daegu 대구 동화사 비로암 삼층석탑 大邱 桐華寺 毘盧庵 三層石塔	Dong District, Daegu	1963-01-21, 2010-12-27 renamed	
248		East and West Three-story Stone Pagodas at Geumdangam Hermitage of Donghwasa Temple, Daegu 대구 동화사 금당암 동·서 삼층석탑 大邱 桐華寺 金堂庵 東·西 三層石塔	Dong District, Daegu	1963-01-21, 2010-12-27 renamed	
249		Three-story Stone Pagoda of Buseoksa Temple, Yeongju 영주 부석사 삼층석탑 榮州 浮石寺 三層石塔	Yeongju, North Gyeongsang	1963-01-21, 2010-12-27 renamed	
250		Three-story Stone Pagoda of Beomeosa Temple, Busan 부산 범어사 삼층석탑 釜山 梵魚寺 三層石塔	Geumjeong District, Busan	1963-01-21, 2010-12-27 renamed	
251		Stele for State Preceptor Daegak at Seonbongsa Temple, Chilgok 칠곡 선봉사 대각국사비 漆谷 僊鳳寺 大覺國師碑	Chilgok County, North Gyeongsang	1963-01-21, 2010-12-27 renamed	
252		Stele for State Preceptor Wonjin at Bogyeongsa Temple, Pohang 포항 보경사 원진국사비 浦項 寶鏡寺 圓眞國師碑	Pohang, North Gyeongsang	1963-01-21, 2010-12-27 renamed	
253		Stone Lantern of Cheongnyangsa Temple, Hapcheon 합천 청량사 석등 陜川 淸凉寺 石燈	Hapcheon County, South Gyeongsang	1963-01-21, 2010-12-27 renamed	
254		Flagpole Supports of Donghwasa Temple, Daegu 대구 동화사 당간지주 大邱 桐華寺 幢竿支柱	Dong District, Daegu	1963-01-21, 2010-12-27 renamed	
255		Flagpole Supports of Buseoksa Temple, Yeongju 영주 부석사 당간지주 榮州 浮石寺 幢竿支柱	Yeongju, North Gyeongsang	1963-01-21, 2010-12-27 renamed	
256		Iron Flagpole of Gapsa Temple, Gongju 공주 갑사 철당간 公州 甲寺 鐵幢竿	Gongju, South Chungcheong	1963-01-21, 2010-12-27 renamed	
257		Stupa of Gapsa Temple, Gongju 공주 갑사 승탑 公州 甲寺 僧塔	Gongju, South Chungcheong	1963-01-21, 2010-12-27 renamed	
258		Stupa with Lion and Musician in Relief in Sangyeok-dong, Daegu 대구 산격동 사자 주악장식 승탑 大邱 山格洞 獅子 奏樂裝飾 僧塔	Buk District, Daegu	1963-01-21, 2010-12-27 renamed	
259		Reliquaries from the Stupa of Sujongsa Temple, Namyangju 남양주 수종사 사리탑 사리장엄구 南陽州 水鐘寺 舍利塔 舍利莊嚴具	Jongno District, Seoul	1963-01-21, 2019-06-26 renamed	
260		Woodblocks of Miam ilgi (Diary of Miam) and Miamjip (Collected Works of Miam) by Yu Hui-chun 유희춘 미암일기 및 미암집목판 柳希春 眉巖日記 및 眉巖集木板	Damyang County, South Jeolla	1963-01-21, 2010-08-25 renamed	
261		Chungjae ilgi (Diary of Chungjae) by Gwon Beol 권벌 충재일기 權橃 沖齋日記	Bonghwa County, North Gyeongsang	1963-01-21, 2010-08-25 renamed	
262		Geunsarok (Reflections on Things at Hand) 근사록 近思錄	Bonghwa County, North Gyeongsang	1963-01-21	
263		Hasadang Dormitory of Songgwangsa Temple, Suncheon 순천 송광사 하사당 順天 松廣寺 下舍堂	Suncheon, South Jeolla	1963-01-21	
264		Stone Standing Buddha of Haeinsa Temple, Hapcheon 합천 해인사 석조여래입상 陜川 海印寺 石造如來立像	Hapcheon County, South Gyeongsang	1963-01-21	
265		Stone Seated Buddha of Cheongnyangsa Temple, Hapcheon 합천 청량사 석조여래좌상 陜川 淸凉寺 石造如來坐像	Hapcheon County, South Gyeongsang	1963-01-21, 2010-08-25 renamed	
266		Three-story Stone Pagoda of Cheongnyangsa Temple, Hapcheon 합천 청량사 삼층석탑 陜川 淸凉寺 三層石塔	Hapcheon County, South Gyeongsang	1963-01-21, 2010-12-27 renamed	
267		Stone Lantern at Jingusa Temple Site, Imsil 임실 진구사지 석등 任實 珍丘寺址 石燈	Imsil County, North Jeolla	1963-01-21, 2010-12-27 renamed	
268		Buncheong Flat Bottle with Inlaid Lotus Design 분청사기 상감연화문 편병 粉靑沙器 象嵌蓮花文 扁甁	Buk District, Daegu	1963-01-21	
269-1		Transcription of Saddharmapundarika Sutra (The Lotus Sutra) in Silver on Indigo Paper, Volume 1 감지은니묘법연화경 권1 紺紙銀泥妙法蓮華經 卷一	Yongsan District, Seoul	1963-01-21, 2007-10-24번호 변경, 2010-08-25 renamed	
269-2		Transcription of Saddharmapundarika Sutra (The Lotus Sutra) in Silver on Indigo Paper, Volumes 2, 4, 5, and 6 감지은니묘법연화경 권2, 4, 5, 6 紺紙銀泥妙法蓮華經 卷二, 四, 五, 六	Jongno District, Seoul	1963-09-02, 2010-08-25 renamed	
269-3		Transcription of Saddharmapundarika Sutra (The Lotus Sutra) in Silver on Indigo Paper, Volume 3 감지은니묘법연화경 권3 紺紙銀泥妙法蓮華經 卷三	Seo District, Busan	2007-10-24, 2010-08-25 renamed	
269-4		Transcription of Saddharmapundarika Sutra (The Lotus Sutra) in Silver on Indigo Paper, Volume 7 감지은니묘법연화경 권7 紺紙銀泥妙法蓮華經 卷七	Yongsan District, Seoul	2007-10-24, 2010-08-25 renamed	
270		Transcription of Saddharmapundarika Sutra (The Lotus Sutra) in Gold on Indigo Paper, Volume 6 감지금니 묘법연화경 권6 紺紙金泥妙法蓮華經 卷六	Yongsan District, Seoul	1963-01-21, 2010-08-25 renamed	
271		Transcription of Shurangama Sutra (The Sutra of the Heroic One) in Silver on White Paper, Volume 10 백지은니대불정여래밀인수증요의제보살만행수능엄경 권10 白紙銀泥大佛頂如來密因脩證了義諸菩薩萬行首楞嚴經 卷十	Buk District, Daegu	1963-01-21, 2010-08-25 renamed	
272		Daeseongjeon Shrine of Jangsuhyanggyo Local Confucian School 장수향교 대성전 長水鄕校 大成殿	Jangsu County, North Jeolla	1963-01-21	
273		Stupa of Master Jeokin at Taeansa Temple, Gokseong 곡성 태안사 적인선사탑 谷城 泰安寺 寂忍禪師塔	Gokseong County, South Jeolla	1963-01-21, 2010-12-27 renamed	
274		Stupa of Buddhist Monk Gwangja at Taeansa Temple, Gokseong 곡성 태안사 광자대사탑 谷城 泰安寺 廣慈大師塔	Gokseong County, South Jeolla	1963-01-21, 2010-12-27 renamed	
275		Stele for Buddhist Monk Gwangja at Taeansa Temple, Gokseong 곡성 태안사 광자대사탑비 谷城 泰安寺 廣慈大師塔碑	Gokseong County, South Jeolla	1963-01-21, 2010-12-27 renamed	
276		Five-story Stone Pagoda in Balsan-ri, Gunsan 군산 발산리 오층석탑 群山 鉢山里 五層石塔	Gunsan, North Jeolla	1963-01-21, 2010-12-27 renamed	
277		Bronze Bell of Naesosa Temple, Buan 부안 내소사 동종 扶安 來蘇寺 銅鍾	Buan County, North Jeolla	1963-01-21	
278		Transcription of Saddharmapundarika Sutra (The Lotus Sutra) in Ink on White Paper 백지묵서묘법연화경 白紙墨書妙法蓮華經	Jongno District, Seoul	1963-01-21, 2010-08-25 renamed	
279		Gilt-bronze Seated Ksitigarbha Bodhisattva of Seonunsa Temple, Gochang 고창 선운사 금동지장보살좌상 高敞 禪雲寺 金銅地藏菩薩坐像	Gochang County, North Jeolla	1963-01-21	
280		Gilt-bronze Seated Ksitigarbha Bodhisattva at Dosoram Hermitage of Seonunsa Temple, Gochang 고창 선운사 도솔암 금동지장보살좌상 高敞 禪雲寺 兜率庵 金銅地藏菩薩坐像	Gochang County, North Jeolla	1963-01-21	
281		Gwanghallu Pavilion, Namwon 남원 광한루 南原 廣寒樓	Namwon, North Jeolla	1963-01-21	
282		Twin Lion Stone Lantern from Godalsa Temple Site, Yeoju 여주 고달사지 쌍사자 석등 驪州 高達寺址 雙獅子 石燈	Yongsan District, Seoul	1963-01-21, 2010-12-27 renamed	
283		Geumbo (Scores for Geomungo) 금보 琴譜	Seongbuk District, Seoul	1963-01-21	
284		Gilt-bronze Standing Buddha 금동여래입상 金銅如來立像	Yongsan District, Seoul	1963-01-21	
285		Gilt-bronze Standing Bodhisattva 금동보살입상 金銅菩薩立像	Yongsan District, Seoul	1963-01-21	
286		Celadon Prunus Vase with Inlaid Grapes and Child Design 청자 상감포도동자문 매병 靑磁 象嵌葡萄童子文 梅甁	Seongbuk District, Seoul	1963-01-21	
287		Buncheong Bottle with Sgraffito Floral Design in Underglaze Iron 분청사기 박지철채화문 병 粉靑沙器 剝地鐵彩花文 甁	Seongbuk District, Seoul	1963-01-21	
288		Bronze Incense Burner with Silver-inlaid Design 청동 은입사 향완 靑銅 銀入絲 香垸	Uiwang, Gyeonggi	1963-01-21	
289		Pihyangjeong Pavilion, Jeongeup 정읍 피향정 井邑 披香亭	Jeongeup, North Jeolla	1963-01-21	
290		Daeungjeon Hall of Seonunsa Temple, Gochang 고창 선운사 대웅전 高敞 禪雲寺 大雄殿	Gochang County, North Jeolla	1963-01-21	
291		Daeungbojeon Hall of Naesosa Temple, Buan 부안 내소사 대웅보전 扶安 來蘇寺 大雄寶殿	Buan County, North Jeolla	1963-01-21	
292		Daeungjeon Hall of Gaeamsa Temple, Buan 부안 개암사 대웅전 扶安 開岩寺 大雄殿	Buan County, North Jeolla	1963-01-21	
~~293호~~		~~세병관~~; ~~洗兵館~~	Tongyeong, South Gyeongsang	1963-01-21, 2002-10-14 removed, made National Treasure No. 305	
294		Three-story Stone Pagoda at Seungansa Temple Site, Hamyang 함양 승안사지 삼층석탑 咸陽 昇安寺址 三層石塔	Hamyang County, South Gyeongsang	1963-01-21, 2010-12-27 renamed	
295		Stone Seated Buddha at Yongseondae Cliff of Gwallyongsa Temple, Changnyeong 창녕 관룡사 용선대 석조여래좌상 昌寧 觀龍寺 龍船臺 石造如來坐像	Changnyeong County, South Gyeongsang	1963-01-21, 2010-08-25 renamed	
296		Stone Seated Bodhisattva at Sudoam Hermitage of Cheongamsa Temple, Gimcheon 김천 청암사 수도암 석조보살좌상 金泉 靑巖寺 修道庵 石造菩薩坐像	Gimcheon, North Gyeongsang	1963-01-21, 2010-08-25 renamed	
297		East and West Three-story Stone Pagodas at Sudoam Hermitage of Cheongamsa Temple, Gimcheon 김천 청암사 수도암 동·서 삼층석탑 金泉 靑巖寺 修道庵 東·西 三層石塔	Gimcheon, North Gyeongsang	1963-01-21, 2010-12-27 renamed	
298		Three-story Stone Pagoda at Wollamsa Temple Site, Gangjin 강진 월남사지 삼층석탑 康津 月南寺址 三層石塔	Gangjin County, South Jeolla	1963-01-21, 2010-12-27 renamed	
299		Daeungjeon Hall of Hwaeomsa Temple, Gurye 구례 화엄사 대웅전 求禮 華嚴寺 大雄殿	Gurye County, South Jeolla	1963-01-21	
300		Lion Pagoda at Wontongjeon Hall of Hwaeomsa Temple, Gurye 구례 화엄사 원통전 앞 사자탑 求禮 華嚴寺 圓通殿 앞 獅子塔	Gurye County, South Jeolla	1963-01-21, 2010-12-27 renamed	
301		Three-story Stone Pagoda at Bungmireugam Hermitage of Daeheungsa Temple, Haenam 해남 대흥사 북미륵암 삼층석탑 海南 大興寺 北彌勒庵 三層石塔	Haenam County, South Jeolla	1963-01-21, 2010-12-27 renamed	
302		Yaksajeon Hall of Songgwangsa Temple, Suncheon 순천 송광사 약사전 順天 松廣寺 藥師殿	Suncheon, South Jeolla	1963-01-21	
303		Yeongsanjeon Hall of Songgwangsa Temple, Suncheon 순천 송광사 영산전 順天 松廣寺 靈山殿	Suncheon, South Jeolla	1963-01-21	
304		Rainbow Bridge in Beolgyo, Boseong 보성 벌교 홍교 寶城 筏橋 虹橋	Boseong County, South Jeolla	1963-01-21, 2010-12-27 renamed	
305		Stone Ice Storage, Andong 안동 석빙고 安東 石氷庫	Andong, North Gyeongsang	1963-01-21, 2010-12-27 renamed	
306		Yangjindang House in Hahoe, Andong 안동 하회 양진당 安東 河回 養眞堂	Andong, North Gyeongsang	1963-01-21	
307		Stone Seated Vairocana Buddha at Sudoam Hermitage of Cheongamsa Temple, Gimcheon 김천 청암사 수도암 석조비로자나불좌상 金泉 靑巖寺 修道庵 石造毘盧遮那佛坐像	Gimcheon, North Gyeongsang	1963-01-21, 2010-08-25 renamed	
308		Pungnammun Gate, Jeonju 전주 풍남문 全州 豐南門	Jeonju, North Jeolla	1963-01-21	
309		Seven-story Stone Pagoda at Cheongoksa Temple Site, Jeongeup 정읍 천곡사지 칠층석탑 井邑 泉谷寺址 七層石塔	Jeongeup, North Jeolla	1963-01-21, 2010-12-27 renamed	
310		Stone Ice Storage, Changnyeong 창녕 석빙고 昌寧 石氷庫	Changnyeong County, South Gyeongsang	1963-01-21, 2010-12-27 renamed	
311		Geumgye ilgi (Diary of Geumgye) by No In 노인 금계일기 魯認 錦溪日記	Buk District, Gwangju	1963-01-21	
312		Five-story Stone Pagoda in Sotae-ri, Miryang 밀양 소태리 오층석탑 密陽 小台里 五層石塔	Miryang, South Gyeongsang	1963-01-21, 2010-12-27 renamed	
313		Stele for State Preceptor Jingak at Wollamsa Temple Site, Gangjin 강진 월남사지 진각국사비 康津 月南寺址 眞覺國師碑	Gangjin County, South Jeolla	1963-01-21, 2010-12-27 renamed	
314		Transcription of Saddharmapundarika Sutra (The Lotus Sutra) in Gold on Indigo Paper, Volumes 3 and 4 감지금니 묘법연화경 권3~4 紺紙金泥妙法蓮華經 卷三~四	Gyeongju, North Gyeongsang	1963-01-21	
315		Transcription of Saddharmapundarika Sutra (The Lotus Sutra) in Ink on White Paper, Volumes 1 and 3 백지묵서 묘법연화경 권1, 3 白紙墨書妙法蓮華經 卷一, 三	Gyeongju, North Gyeongsang	1963-01-21	
316		Stele for State Preceptor Woneung at Unmunsa Temple, Cheongdo 청도 운문사 원응국사비 淸道 雲門寺 圓鷹國師碑	Cheongdo County, North Gyeongsang	1963-01-21, 2010-12-27 renamed	
317		Stone Seated Buddha of Unmunsa Temple, Cheongdo 청도 운문사 석조여래좌상 淸道 雲門寺 石造如來坐像	Cheongdo County, North Gyeongsang	1963-01-21, 2010-08-25 renamed	
318		Stone Reliefs of Four Guardian Kings at Unmunsa Temple, Cheongdo 청도 운문사 석조사천왕상 淸道 雲門寺 石造四天王像	Cheongdo County, North Gyeongsang	1963-01-21, 2010-12-27 renamed	
319		Stone Seated Bhaisajyaguru Buddha of Jikjisa Temple, Gimcheon 김천 직지사 석조약사여래좌상 金泉 直指寺 石造藥師如來坐像	Gimcheon, North Gyeongsang	1963-01-21, 2010-08-25 renamed	
320		Three-story Stone Pagoda of Daeheungsa Temple, Haenam 해남 대흥사 삼층석탑 海南 大興寺 三層石塔	Haenam County, South Jeolla	1963-01-21, 2010-12-27 renamed	
321		Bronze Incense Burner with Silver-inlaid Design of Bongeunsa Temple 봉은사 청동 은입사 향완 奉恩寺 靑銅 銀入絲 香垸	Jongno District, Seoul	1963-01-21	
322		Gwandeokjeong Hall, Jeju 제주 관덕정 濟州 觀德亭	Jeju City, Jeju	1963-01-21	
323		Stone Ice Storage, Cheongdo 청도 석빙고 淸道 石氷庫	Cheongdo County, North Gyeongsang	1963-01-21, 2010-12-27 renamed	
~~324~~		~~여수진남관~~; ~~麗水鎭南館~~	~~Yeosu, South Jeolla~~	1963-01-21, 2001-04-17 removed, made National Treasure No. 304	
325		Reliquaries from the Five-story Brick Pagoda of Songnimsa Temple, Chilgok 칠곡 송림사 오층전탑 사리장엄구 漆谷 松林寺 五層塼塔 舍利莊嚴具	Suseong District, Daegu	1963-01-21	
326		Relics Related to Yi Sun-sin 이순신 유물 일괄 李舜臣 遺物 一括	Asan, South Chungcheong	1963-01-21	
327		Five-story Stone Pagoda at Bingsansa Temple Site, Uiseong 의성 빙산사지 오층석탑 義城 氷山寺址 五層石塔	Uiseong County, North Gyeongsang	1963-01-21, 2010-12-27 renamed	
328	가운데	Gilt-bronze Standing Bhaisajyaguru Buddha 금동약사여래입상 金銅藥師如來立像	Yongsan District, Seoul	1963-01-21	
329		Stone Seated Buddha from Gunsu-ri, Buyeo 부여 군수리 석조여래좌상 扶餘 軍守里 石造如來坐像	Buyeo County, South Chungcheong	1963-01-21	
330		Gilt-bronze Standing Bodhisattva from Gunsu-ri, Buyeo 부여 군수리 금동보살입상 扶餘 軍守里 金銅菩薩立像	Buyeo County, South Chungcheong	1963-01-21	
331		Gilt-bronze Pensive Maitreya Bodhisattva 금동미륵보살반가사유상 金銅彌勒菩薩半跏思惟像	Yongsan District, Seoul	1963-01-21	
332		Iron Seated Sakyamuni Buddha from Hasachang-dong, Hanam 하남 하사창동 철조석가여래좌상 河南 下司倉洞 鐵造釋迦如來坐像	Yongsan District, Seoul	1963-01-21	
333		Gilt-bronze Standing Bodhisattva 금동보살입상 金銅菩薩立像	Yongsan District, Seoul	1963-01-21	
334		Bronze Incense Burner with Silver-inlaid Design of Tongdosa Temple 통도사 청동 은입사 향완 通度寺 靑銅 銀入絲 香垸	Yangsan, South Gyeongsang	1963-01-21	
335		Stone Seated Vairocana Buddha 석조비로자나불좌상 石造毘盧遮那佛坐像	Buk District, Daegu	1963-01-21	
336		Armor Worn by General Jeong Ji 정지장군 갑옷 鄭地將軍 甲衣	Buk District, Gwangju	1963-01-21	
337		Gilt-bronze Seated Bhaisajyaguru Buddha of Janggoksa Temple, Cheongyang 청양 장곡사 금동약사여래좌상 靑陽 長谷寺 金銅藥師如來坐像	Cheongyang County, South Chungcheong	1963-01-21	
338		Gold Crown from Geumnyeongchong Tomb 금령총 금관 金鈴塚 金冠	Yongsan District, Seoul	1963-01-21	
339		Gold Crown from Seobongchong Tomb 서봉총 금관 瑞鳳塚 金冠	Gyeongju, North Gyeongsang	1963-01-21	
340		Celadon Prunus Vase with Paste-on-paste Ginseng Leaf Design in Underglaze Iron 청자 철채퇴화삼엽문 매병 靑磁 鐵彩堆花蔘葉文 梅甁	Yongsan District, Seoul	1963-01-21	
~~341~~		~~청자상감모란문표형병~~; ~~靑磁象嵌牡丹文瓢形甁~~	~~Jongno District, Seoul~~	1963-01-21, 1963-01-21 removed	
342		Celadon Lidded Prunus Vase with Incised Peony Design and Inlaid Wrapping Cloth Design 청자 음각모란 상감보자기문 유개매병 靑磁 陰刻牡丹 象嵌襆紗文 有蓋梅甁	Yongsan District, Seoul	1963-01-21	
343		Earthenware Patterned Tiles from Oe-ri, Buyeo 부여 외리 문양전 일괄 扶餘 外里 文樣塼 一括	Yongsan District, Seoul	1963-01-21	
344		Celadon Kundika with Reeds and Wild Geese in Relief 청자 양각갈대기러기문 정병 靑磁 陽刻葦蘆文 淨甁	Yongsan District, Seoul	1963-01-21	
345		White Porcelain Prunus Vase with Inlaid Peony Design 백자 상감모란문 매병 白磁 象嵌牡丹文 梅甁	Yongsan District, Seoul	1963-01-21	
346		Celadon Prunus Vase with Inlaid Peony Design in Underglaze Copper 청자 상감동채모란문 매병 靑磁 象嵌銅彩牡丹文 梅甁	Yongsan District, Seoul	1963-01-21	
347		Buncheong Prunus Vase with Inlaid Fish Design 분청사기 상감어문 매병 粉靑沙器 象嵌魚文 梅甁	Yongsan District, Seoul	1963-01-21	
348		Buncheong Lidded Bowl with Inlaid Peony Design 분청사기 상감모란문 반합 粉靑沙器 象嵌牡丹文 飯盒	Seongbuk District, Seoul	1963-01-21	
349		Celadon Lidded Bowl Set with Inlaid Chrysanthemum, Peony, and Scroll Design 청자 상감국화모란당초문 모자합 靑磁 象嵌菊花牡丹唐草文 母子盒	Seongbuk District, Seoul	1963-01-21	
350		Jungjeongdang Lecture Hall, Shrine, and Walls of Dodongseowon Confucian Academy, Dalseong 달성 도동서원 중정당·사당·담장 達城 道東書院 中正堂·祠堂·담장	Dalseong County, Daegu	1963-01-21	
351		Stupa of Buddhist Monk Daegyeong from Borisa Temple Site, Yangpyeong (Presumed) 전 양평 보리사지 대경대사탑 傳 楊平 菩提寺址 大鏡大師塔	Seodaemun District, Seoul	1963-01-21, 2010-12-27 renamed	
352		Transcription of Saddharmapundarika Sutra (The Lotus Sutra) in Silver on Indigo Paper, Volume 7 감지은니묘법연화경 권7 紺紙銀泥妙法蓮華經 卷七	Seodaemun District, Seoul	1963-01-21	
353		Twin Lion Stone Lantern at Yeongamsa Temple Site, Hapcheon 합천 영암사지 쌍사자 석등 陜川 靈岩寺址 雙獅子 石燈	Hapcheon County, South Gyeongsang	1963-01-21, 2010-12-27 renamed	
354		Five-story Stone Pagoda at Cheonheungsa Temple Site, Cheonan 천안 천흥사지 오층석탑 天安 天興寺址 五層石塔	Cheonan, South Chungcheong	1963-01-21, 2010-12-27 renamed	
355		Rock-carved Standing Buddha in Singyeong-ri, Hongseong 홍성 신경리 마애여래입상 洪城 新耕里 磨崖如來立像	Hongseong County, South Chungcheong	1963-01-21, 2010-08-25 renamed	
356		Geungnakjeon Hall of Muryangsa Temple, Buyeo 부여 무량사 극락전 扶餘 無量寺 極樂殿	Buyeo County, South Chungcheong	1963-01-21	
357		Five-story Stone Pagoda from Jeongdosa Temple Site, Chilgok 칠곡 정도사지 오층석탑 漆谷 淨兜寺址 五層石塔	Suseong District, Daegu	1963-01-21, 2010-12-27 renamed	
358		Stupas of Buddhist Monk Boje from Yeongjeonsa Temple Site, Wonju 원주 영전사지 보제존자탑 原州 令傳寺址 普濟尊者塔	Yongsan District, Seoul	1963-01-21, 2010-12-27 renamed	
359		Stele for State Preceptor Hongbeop from Jeongtosa Temple Site, Chungju 충주 정토사지 홍법국사탑비 忠州 淨土寺址 弘法國師塔碑	Yongsan District, Seoul	1963-01-21, 2010-12-27 renamed	
360		Stele for Master Wonrang from Wolgwangsa Temple Site, Jecheon 제천 월광사지 원랑선사탑비 堤川 月光寺址 圓朗禪師塔碑	Yongsan District, Seoul	1963-01-21, 2010-12-27 renamed	
361		Stele for Buddhist Monk Daegyeong from Borisa Temple Site, Yangpyeong 양평 보리사지 대경대사탑비 楊平 菩提寺址 大鏡大師塔碑	Yongsan District, Seoul	1963-01-21, 2010-12-27 renamed	
362		Stupa of Buddhist Monk Jingyeong from Bongnimsa Temple Site, Changwon 창원 봉림사지 진경대사탑 昌原 鳳林寺址 眞鏡大師塔	Yongsan District, Seoul	1963-01-21, 2010-12-27 renamed	
363		Stele for Buddhist Monk Jingyeong from Bongnimsa Temple Site, Changwon 창원 봉림사지 진경대사탑비 昌原 鳳林寺址 眞鏡大師塔碑	Yongsan District, Seoul	1963-01-21, 2010-12-27 renamed	
364		Stone Lantern Inside the West Gate, Naju 나주 서성문 안 석등 羅州 西城門 안 石燈	Yongsan District, Seoul	1963-01-21, 2010-12-27 renamed	
365		Stupa of Buddhist Monk Jingong and Stone Casket from Heungbeopsa Temple Site, Wonju 원주 흥법사지 진공대사탑 및 석관 原州 興法寺址 眞空大師塔 및 石棺	Yongsan District, Seoul	1963-01-21, 2010-12-27 renamed	
366		Reliquaries from the West Three-story Stone Pagoda at Gameunsa Temple Site 감은사지 서삼층석탑 사리장엄구 感恩寺址 西三層石塔 舍利莊嚴具	Gyeongju, North Gyeongsang	1963-01-21	
367		Stele of Amitabha Buddha with Inscription of "Gichuk Year" 기축명아미타불비상 己丑銘阿彌陀佛碑像	Cheongju, North Chungcheong	1963-01-21	
368		Stele of Pensive Maitreya Bodhisattva 미륵보살반가사유비상 彌勒菩薩半跏思惟碑像	Cheongju, North Chungcheong	1963-01-21	
369		Stupa of Seongnamsa Temple, Ulju 울주 석남사 승탑 蔚州 石南寺 僧塔	Ulju County, Ulsan	1963-01-21, 2010-12-27 renamed	
370		Stone Seated Buddha at Ganwolsa Temple Site, Ulju 울주 간월사지 석조여래좌상 蔚州 澗月寺址 石造如來坐像	Ulju County, Ulsan	1963-01-21, 2010-08-25 renamed	
371		Stone Seated Buddha from Sawol-ri, Sancheong 산청 사월리 석조여래좌상 山淸 沙月里 石造如來坐像	Jinju, South Gyeongsang	1963-01-21, 2010-08-25 renamed	
372		Stupa at Yongamsa Temple Site, Jinju 진주 용암사지 승탑 晉州 龍巖寺址 僧塔	Jinju, South Gyeongsang	1963-01-21, 2010-12-27 renamed	
373		Three-story Stone Pagoda at Bocheonsa Temple Site, Uiryeong 의령 보천사지 삼층석탑 宜寧 寶泉寺址 三層石塔	Uiryeong County, South Gyeongsang	1963-01-21, 2010-12-27 renamed	
374		Daeungjeon Hall of Yulgoksa Temple, Sancheong 산청 율곡사 대웅전 山淸 栗谷寺 大雄殿	Sancheong County, South Gyeongsang	1963-01-21	
375		Rock-carved Standing Buddha in Deokjeon-ri, Hamyang 함양 덕전리 마애여래입상 咸陽 德田里 磨崖如來立像	Hamyang County, South Gyeongsang	1963-01-21, 2010-08-25 renamed	
376		Stone Seated Buddha of Gyosan-ri, Hamyang 함양 교산리 석조여래좌상 咸陽 校山里 石造如來坐像	Hamyang County, South Gyeongsang	1963-01-21, 2010-08-25 renamed	
377		Stone Standing Buddha in Yangpyeong-ri, Geochang 거창 양평리 석조여래입상 居昌 陽平里 石造如來立像	Geochang County, South Gyeongsang	1963-01-21, 2010-08-25 renamed	
378		Stone Standing Bodhisattva in Sangnim-ri, Geochang 거창 상림리 석조보살입상 居昌 上林里 石造菩薩立像	Geochang County, South Gyeongsang	1963-01-21, 2010-08-25 renamed	
379		Three-story Stone Pagoda at Myoeomsa Temple Site, Jinju 진주 묘엄사지 삼층석탑 晉州 妙嚴寺址 三層石塔	Jinju, South Gyeongsang	1963-01-21, 2010-12-27 renamed	
380		Stupa of Ssanggyesa Temple, Hadong 하동 쌍계사 승탑 河東 雙磎寺 僧塔	Hadong County, South Gyeongsang	1963-01-21, 2010-12-27 renamed	
381		Stone Lantern in Baegam-ri, Hapcheon 합천 백암리 석등 陜川 伯岩里 石燈	Hapcheon County, South Gyeongsang	1963-01-21, 2010-12-27 renamed	
382		Three-story Stone Pagoda at Cheongsongsa Temple Site, Ulju 울주 청송사지 삼층석탑 蔚州 靑松寺址 三層石塔	Ulju County, Ulsan	1963-01-21, 2010-12-27 renamed	
383		Donhwamun Gate of Changdeokgung Palace 창덕궁 돈화문 昌德宮 敦化門	Jongno District, Seoul	1963-01-21	
384		Honghwamun Gate of Changgyeonggung Palace 창경궁 홍화문 昌慶宮 弘化門	Jongno District, Seoul	1963-01-21	
385		Myeongjeongmun Gate and Corridor of Changgyeonggung Palace 창경궁 명정문 및 행각 昌慶宮 明政門 및 行閣	Jongno District, Seoul	1963-01-21	
386		Okcheongyo Bridge of Changgyeonggung Palace 창경궁 옥천교 昌慶宮 玉川橋	Jongno District, Seoul	1963-01-21	
387		Stele for Royal Preceptor Seongak at Hoeamsa Temple Site, Yangju 양주 회암사지 선각왕사비 楊州 檜巖寺址 禪覺王師碑	Yangju, Gyeonggi	1963-09-02, 2010-12-27 renamed	
388		Stupa of Buddhist Monk Muhak at Hoeamsa Temple Site, Yangju 양주 회암사지 무학대사탑 楊州 檜巖寺址 無學大師塔	Yangju, Gyeonggi	1963-09-02, 2010-12-27 renamed	
389		Twin Lion Stone Lantern in Front of the Stupa of Buddhist Monk Muhak at Hoeamsa Temple Site, Yangju 양주 회암사지 무학대사탑 앞 쌍사자 석등 楊州 檜巖寺址 無學大師塔 앞 雙獅子 石燈	Yangju, Gyeonggi	1963-09-02, 2010-12-27 renamed	
390		Goryeo Transcription of Buddhist Sutras in Gwangdeoksa Temple, Cheonan 천안 광덕사 고려사경 天安 廣德寺 高麗寫經	Jongno District, Seoul	1963-09-02	
391		Busanjin sunjeoldo (Patriotic Martyrs at the Battle of Busanjin Fortress) 부산진순절도 釜山鎭殉節圖	Nowon District, Seoul	1963-09-02	
392		Dongnaebu sunjeoldo (Patriotic Martyrs at the Battle of Dongnaebu Fortress) 동래부순절도 東萊府殉節圖	Nowon District, Seoul	1963-09-02	
393		Iron Bell of Jeondeungsa Temple 전등사 철종 傳燈寺 鐵鍾	Ganghwa County, Incheon	1963-09-02	
394		Daeseongjeon Shrine of Najuhyanggyo Local Confucian School 나주향교 대성전 羅州鄕校 大成殿	Naju, South Jeolla	1963-09-02	
395		East and West Three-story Stone Pagodas of Seonamsa Temple, Suncheon 순천 선암사 동·서 삼층석탑 順天 仙巖寺 東·西 三層石塔	Suncheon, South Jeolla	1963-09-02, 2010-12-27 renamed	
396		Daeungjeon Hall of Heungguksa Temple, Yeosu 여수 흥국사 대웅전 麗水 興國寺 大雄殿	Yeosu, South Jeolla	1963-09-02	
397		Bronze Bell of Bongseonsa Temple, Namyangju 남양주 봉선사 동종 南陽州 奉先寺 銅鍾	Namyangju, Gyeonggi	1963-09-02	
~~398~~		~~Worin cheongangjigok (Songs of the Moon's Reflection on a Thousand Rivers), Volume 1~~; ~~월인천강지곡 권상~~; ~~月印千江之曲 卷上~~	Seocho District, Seoul	1963-09-02, 2017-01-02 removed, made National Treasure No. 320	
399		Daeungjeon Hall of Gosansa Temple, Hongseong 홍성 고산사 대웅전 洪城 高山寺 大雄殿	Hongseong County, South Chungcheong	1963-09-02	
400		Seungseongyo Bridge of Seonamsa Temple, Suncheon 순천 선암사 승선교 順天 仙巖寺 昇仙橋	Suncheon, South Jeolla	1963-09-02, 2010-12-27 renamed	
401		Gilt-bronze Standing Buddha 금동여래입상 金銅如來立像	Yongsan District, Seoul	1964-09-03	
402		Paldalmun Gate, Suwon 수원 팔달문 水原 八達門	Suwon, Gyeonggi	1964-09-03	
403		Hwaseomun Gate, Suwon 수원 화서문 水原 華西門	Suwon, Gyeonggi	1964-09-03	
404		Stele of Yeongok-ri, Jincheon 진천 연곡리 석비 鎭川 蓮谷里 石碑	Jincheon County, North Chungcheong	1964-09-03, 2010-12-27 renamed	
405		Three-story Stone Pagoda in Hyangsan-ri, Danyang 단양 향산리 삼층석탑 丹陽 香山里 三層石塔	Danyang County, North Chungcheong	1964-09-03, 2010-12-27 renamed	
406		Rock-carved Standing Buddha of Deokjusa Temple, Jecheon 제천 덕주사 마애여래입상 堤川 德周寺 磨崖如來立像	Jecheon, North Chungcheong	1964-09-03, 2010-08-25 renamed	
407		Rock-carved Standing Buddha in Samtae-ri, Cheonan 천안 삼태리 마애여래입상 天安 三台里 磨崖如來立像	Cheonan, South Chungcheong	1964-09-03, 2010-08-25 renamed	
408		Daeungjeon Hall of Ssanggyesa Temple, Nonsan 논산 쌍계사 대웅전 論山 雙溪寺 大雄殿	Nonsan, South Chungcheong	1964-09-03	
409		Gilt-bronze Seated Vairocana Buddha Triad of Yeongtapsa Temple, Dangjin 당진 영탑사 금동비로자나불삼존좌상 唐津 靈塔寺 金銅毘盧遮那佛三尊坐像	Dangjin, South Chungcheong	1964-09-05	
~~410~~		~~Sumanotap Pagoda of Jeongamsa Temple, Jeongseon~~; ~~정선 정암사 수마노탑~~; ~~旌善 淨岩寺 水瑪瑙塔~~	~~Jeongseon County, Gangwon~~	1964-09-04, 2010-12-27 renamed 2020-06-25 removed made National Treasure No. 332	
411		Mucheomdang House in Yangdong, Gyeongju 경주 양동 무첨당 慶州 良洞 無忝堂	Gyeongju, North Gyeongsang	1964-11-14	
412		Hyangdan House in Yangdong, Gyeongju 경주 양동 향단 慶州 良洞 香壇	Gyeongju, North Gyeongsang	1964-11-14	
413		Dongnakdang House, Gyeongju 경주 독락당 慶州 獨樂堂	Gyeongju, North Gyeongsang	1964-11-14	
414		Chunghyodang House in Hahoe, Andong 안동 하회 충효당 安東 河回 忠孝堂	Andong, North Gyeongsang	1964-11-14	
