= Jeong Ji-a =

South Korean author (born 1965)

- Born: 1965 (age 60–61); Gurye, South Jeolla Province
- Occupation: Writer
- Known for: The novel Bbalchisanui ddal

Korean name
- Hangul: 정지아
- Hanja: 鄭智我
- RR: Jeong Jia
- MR: Chŏng Chia

Jeong Ji-a (born 1965) is a South Korean author best known for her novel Bbalchisanui ddal (빨치산의 딸 The Partisan's Daughter). Her book was banned for having violated the National Security Law, and she was once wanted by the authorities.

== Life ==
Jeong Ji-a was born in 1965 in Gurye, South Jeolla Province. Her father Jeong Woonchang, born in 1928 in Muncheokmyeon, Gurye, graduated from a railroad school and worked as a railway worker. After an independent government was established in South Korea in 1948, he joined the Yasandae and fought with the North Korean Guerilla, mostly around the Baekun-san region. Afterwards, he went to Bongdu-san, and Baek-a-san (district officer) and then after the Korean War, he worked as a committee director for the Dodang Department of Labor. He was given the chance to study in Pyongyang, but he returned to becoming a guerrilla, and served as the chairman for the Gokseong-gundang, as well as the deputy head of the Dodang Department of Organization. Later he left the guerrilla to begin underground activities. During his activities, he was arrested and was sentenced to death. After the April Revolution, he was released on sick bail, and was imprisoned again when Ji-a was in the fourth grade. In 1979, he was released via Independence Day special pardon, but he never changed his beliefs, and died in 2008.

When Jeong Ji-a was in the fourth grade, due to her father's return to prison, she came to know that her father was a 'Commie'. At first, she wanted to reject her communist parents, but as she matured, she chose the life of bearing the burden of the history of ordeal as told by the life of her parents. Having decided to write, Jeong entered Chung-Ang University for creative writing, and resolved to write the story of her parents into a book. Lee Seok-pyo, the president of Silcheon Munhak at the time, asked for the serialization of the novel to Jeong, and after four serializations, Bbalchisanui ddal was published in three volumes. After publication, three incidents began simultaneously. Lee was arrested, Jeong became wanted, and The Partisan's Daughter was banned. This happened because at the time, the authorities had classified Bbalchisanui ddal as a work that benefited the enemy. Lee could return to publishing only after six months of imprisonment, and Jeong also went through several years of being wanted by the authorities, and could only return to society after being sentenced for probation. She began her career as a writer again when her short story “Goyomnamu” (고욤나무 The Lotus-persimmon) won the 1996 Chosun Ilbo New Writer's Contest. She published short story collections Haengbok (행복 Happiness; 2004), and Light of Spring ( 봄빛; 2008). She won the Lee Hyo-seok Literary Award with short story "Punggyeong" (풍경 Scenery) in 2006, the Hahn Moo-Sook Literary Prize with short story collection Light of Spring ( 봄빛) in 2008, and the Today's Novel Prize in 2009. She has moved to her hometown Gurye, and has been living there since 2015.

== Writing ==
Jeong Ji A is currently seen as a writer with a special status in the Korean literary circle. This is because she began her career with Bbalchisanui ddal, which dealt with stories of communists, or otherwise known as Partisans, which was a taboo subject in the post-liberation South Korean society. Through this, she achieved the literary success of clearly confirming the ideological identity within Korea's modern history. With Bbalchisanui ddal, her works were banned, and due to activities related to Nodonghaebangmunhak (노동해방문학 Labor Liberation Literature), a journal of the Socialist Workers Union of South Korea, she was wanted for several years, was sentenced to probation, and then returned as a writer through a new writer's contest. Bbalchisanui ddal is the starting point of Jeong's literature, but it cannot be said as the destination that she intends to ultimately arrive at. Jeong states that in the core of literature that she strives for, there is 'human' and 'beauty'. On the short story "Punggyeong", which won the 2006 Lee Hyo-seok Literary Award, the judges, writers Park Wansuh, Kim Hwayoung, and Yoon Humyong, have said the following. "Finally, the writer that had been marked by Bbalchisanui ddal has offset the physical and the spiritual worlds as such, and have strived for a deep and broad world. This is where literature must go. The road of truth, the road of reconciliation and transcendence."

Recently, Jeong's attention is now on those in their 20s, a generation of new sensibility. To Jeong, Koreans in their 20s are a generation that is far from critical economic problems, as well as the memory of South and the North having been one. In contrast, Koreans from their mid-40s are a generation that have experienced dictatorship, and believe in a united nation. In such contexts, regardless of whether those in their 20s are right or wrong, the author's opinion is that without embracing their common emotion, it will be difficult to expect a change in society. In a 2013 interview with OhmyNews, Jeong has stated that she hopes her literature's ultimate destination is a place where "complete understanding for humanity" is possible, and that as part of that, would like to write stories about the corrupted, the materialistic people, in contrast to how she has written so far mostly about beautiful people that withstand life without desires.

== Works ==
=== Novels ===
- Bbalchisanui ddal (빨치산의 딸 The Partisan's Daughter) 1-3, Silcheon Munhak, 1990.

=== Short story collections ===
- Haengbok (행복 Happiness), 2004.
- Light of Spring ( 봄빛), 2008.
- Supui Daehwa (숲의 대화 The Forest Speaks), EunHaengNaMu Publishing, 2013.

=== Reportage ===
- Himangeul simneun saramdeul (희망을 심는 사람들 Those Who Plant Hope), Pilmaek, 2004.
- Byeorang wiui kkeumdeul (벼랑 위의 꿈들 Dreams At The Edge of the Cliff), Samchang, 2013.

=== Works in translation ===
- 歲月 (Japanese; ISBN 978-4-88400-106-3)

== Awards ==
- 1996 Chosun Ilbo New Writer's Contest
- 2006 Lee Hyo-seok Literary Award
- 2008 Today's Novel Prize
- 2009 The Hahn Moo-Sook Literary Prize
