= Lion Pagoda of Hwaeomsa =

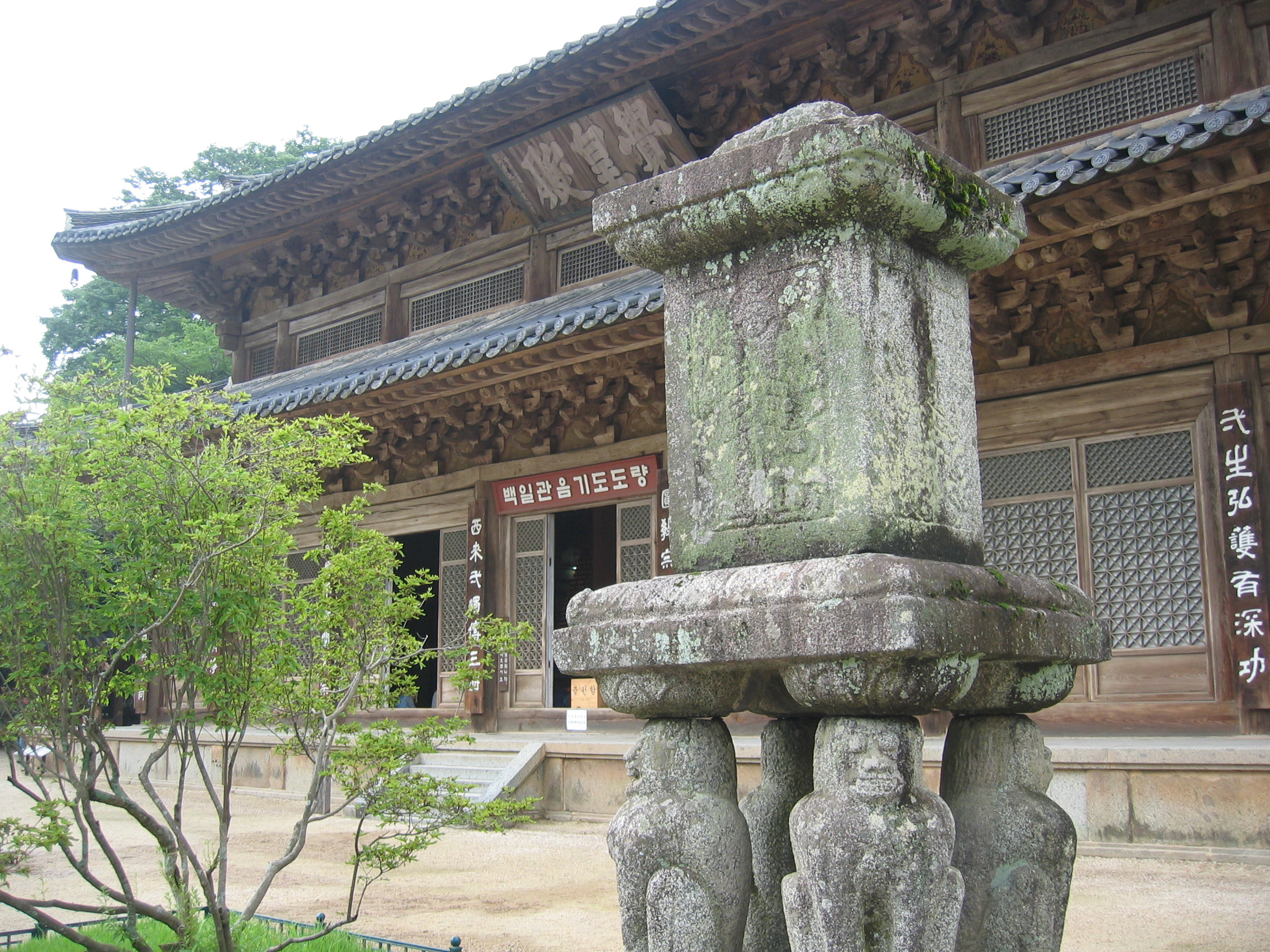

Korean name
- Hangul: 구례 화엄사 원통전 앞 사자탑
- Hanja: 求禮 華嚴寺 圓通殿 앞 獅子塔
- Revised Romanization: Gurye Hwaeomsa Wontongjeon ap Sajatap
- McCune–Reischauer: Kurye Hwaŏmsa Wŏnt'ongchŏn ap Sachat'ap

Hwaeomsa Pillar
- Hangul: 화엄사 노주
- Hanja: 華嚴寺露柱
- Revised Romanization: Hwaeomsa noju
- McCune–Reischauer: Hwaŏmsa nochu

The Four Lion Stone Pagoda is a South Korean pagoda at the Buddhist temple of Hwaeomsa, in Gurye County, South Jeolla Province. It was most likely erected in the 9th century, during the Unified Silla period, although its exact origins and purpose are unknown. Built in the non-typical style, the pagoda has a two-story platform and a single body adorned with relief imagery of the Four Heavenly Kings. It is most notable for the four lion sculptures which make up the upper tier of the platform. It is registered by the Cultural Heritage Administration as Treasure 300 and is commonly known as the "Hwaeomsa Pillar".

== Description ==
The four lion pagoda is one of the four stone pagodas of Hwaeomsa, positioned 11 m (36 ft) south of Wontongjeon Hall and centrally aligned with the face of the building along a north–south axis. It is composed of a two-tiered platform and a single-story body, made from granite with a total height of 3.43 m (11.3 ft).

The first tier of the platform is shaped like a square block, each side made from a single length of stone into which have been carved the base, walls and eaves. It measures about 3.43 m (11.3 ft) across on each side and 59 cm (1.94 ft) in height. There is a double-plinth along the bottom edges. A square slabstone covers the top, creating the appearance of a Buddhist altar. There is no religious imagery and the gaps between the stones are clearly visible.

Instead of walls or columns, a statue of a lion is perched on an eight-petaled lotus pedestal at each corner of the platform's second tier. Each lion is about 76 cm (2.49 ft) high, standing erect with its front feet spread open. The lions each face a different direction and have different facial expressions. Each lion head supports a capital decorated with upturned lotus leaves on its head. These shoulder a square capstone—on which the pagoda body sits—carved with sixteen lotus leaves along its top edges.

The pillar-shaped body stone is comparatively tall, measuring about 92 cm (3.02 ft) in height. Instead of a conventional roof stone, a square slabstone has been laid over top. It is decorated with an upturned hemisphere on top and carved with lotus leaves along its bottom edges. A Buddhist guardian deity surrounded by a thick rectangular border is engraved in low relief on each side of the body stone. These figures likely represent the Four Heavenly Kings: Dhṛtarāṣṭra to the east, Virūpākṣa the west, Virūḍhaka the south, and Vaiśravaṇa the north.

Dhṛtarāṣṭra stands atop a misshapen stone platform, leaning slightly to the right. He is wearing a crown and the armor of a military general, with a simple nimbus around his head. The left arm is raised to the shoulder while the right hand is making a tight fist, as if to strike a downward blow. Armor-clad Virūḍhaka is depicted in the tribhanga stance, leaning to the left, the handle of his sword held in his right hand and the point in his left. Virūpākṣa is identical in appearance, although he leans to the right and his sword is held the opposite way. The figure of Vaiśravaṇa has been sculpted with comparatively greater detail than the other three. Leaning to the left, his right hand rests on the waist while a pagoda is held in his left.

Four Lion Pagoda of Hwaeomsa, Treasure 300

== Provenance ==
The exact provenance of the pagoda is unknown as no contemporary records of its origins survive. According to later accounts from A Chronicle of the Great Temple Hwaeomsa of Jirisan, Gurye County, Honam (1636) (Note: Honamdoguryegunjirisanhwaeomsasajeok (湖南道求禮郡智異山華嚴寺記實)) and The Record of Bongseong (c.1800), (Note: Bongseongji (鳳城誌)) the great monk Jajang (590–658) constructed a pagoda at Hwaeomsa sometime in the early 7th century, but it is uncertain which pagoda this may refer to. Furthermore, contemporary sources agree that given its sculptural style, the four lion pagoda was most likely erected in the 9th century, during the Unified Silla period. This coincides with the stonework of Wontongjeon Hall, whose platform, stairs and threshold go back to the same period; either the remains of an earlier hall, or a system of corridors, although the wooden structure itself was rebuilt in 1703.

== Significance ==
The four lion pagoda was designated Treasure 300 in 1963 by the Cultural Heritage Administration, an example of the Korean non-typical style of stone pagoda. Lions have a high symbolic value in Buddhism and the word is commonly used as a metaphor for the Buddha. The sculptures in this pagoda appear to have been inspired by those of Hwaeomsa's three story pagoda. Although displaying similar facial expressions, the lions of the later pagoda are inferior in both size and craftsmanship, failing to capture the same vitality and sophistication of detail.

While it appears to possess the correct structural components typical of Silla stone pagodas, the overall style of the four lion pagoda does not conform with its contemporaries from the period. There are neither roof stones nor a finial. It is also difficult to say for certain how many stories there are, and the fact that there appears to be only one is problematic. And as the pagoda is also elusively known as the "Hwaeomsa Pillar", (Note: Hwaeomsanoju (露柱華嚴寺)) it unclear whether it is indeed a pagoda—where relics may have been enshrined—or a structure with some other religious purpose.
