= Borisa Sitting Buddha =

Statue in Gyeongju, South Korea

Coordinates: 35°48′43″N 129°14′11″E

- Stone Seated Buddha in Mireukgok Valley of Namsan Mountain, Gyeongju
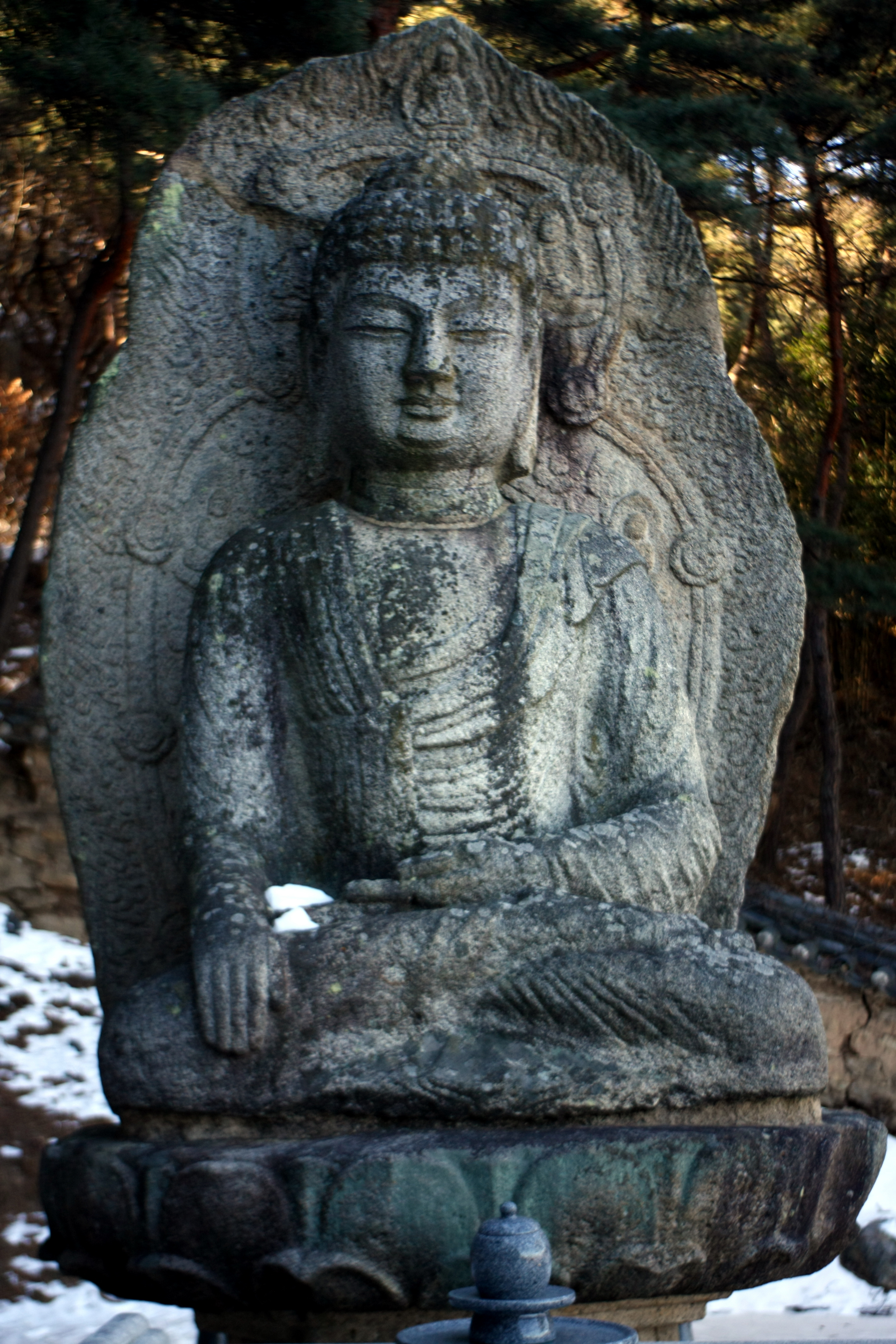
- Front view

Stone Seated Buddha in Mireukgok Valley of Namsan Mountain, Gyeongju
- Hangul: 경주 남산 미륵곡 석불좌상
- Hanja: 慶州南山彌勒谷石佛坐像
- RR: Gyeongju Namsan mireukgok seokbuljwasang
- MR: Kyŏngju Namsan mirŭkkok sŏkpuljwasang

The Stone Seated Buddha in Mireukgok Valley of Namsan Mountain, Gyeongju (Korean: 경주 남산 미륵곡 석불좌상) is located at the east slope of the mountain Namsan in Gyeongju, South Korea. This site is supposed to be the place where Borisa temple had stood during the Silla period. The stone sculpture is 4.36m high, and the seated Buddha image itself is as high as 2.44m. Among the existing Buddhist images on Mt. Namsan, this image is best preserved. The Buddha sitting on the octagonal lotus pedestal is the image of Sakyamuni, who smiles at the world with the half-closed eyes and a merciful facial expression. Small Buddhist images and floral medallion designs are carved on the halo. On the back of the pear-shaped halo, the Bhaisajyaguru Buddhaup-holding a medicine bowl in his left hand is carved in relief.

On January 21, 1963, the sculpture was designated as Treasure No. 136 by the Cultural Properties Administration.

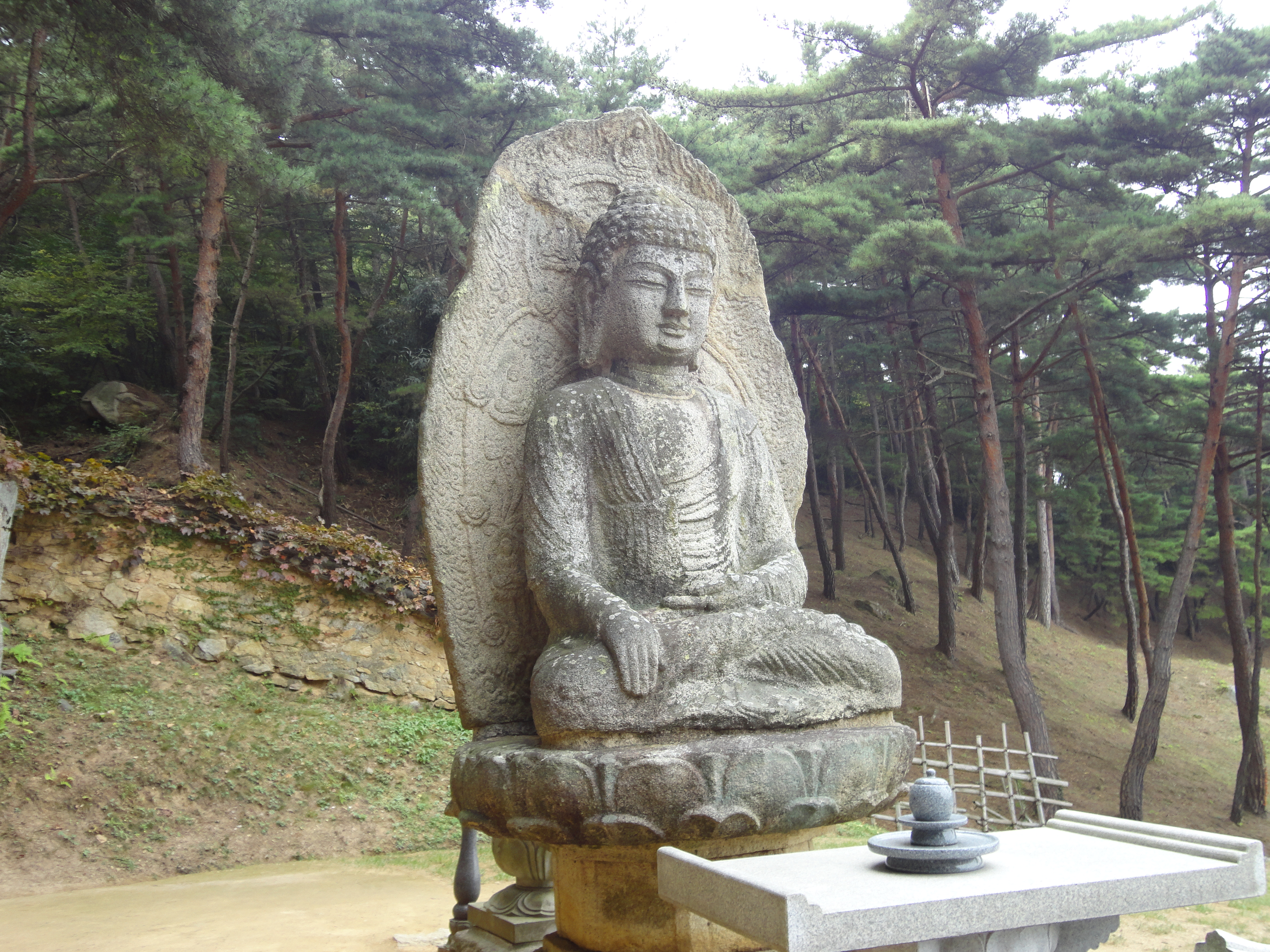
Front

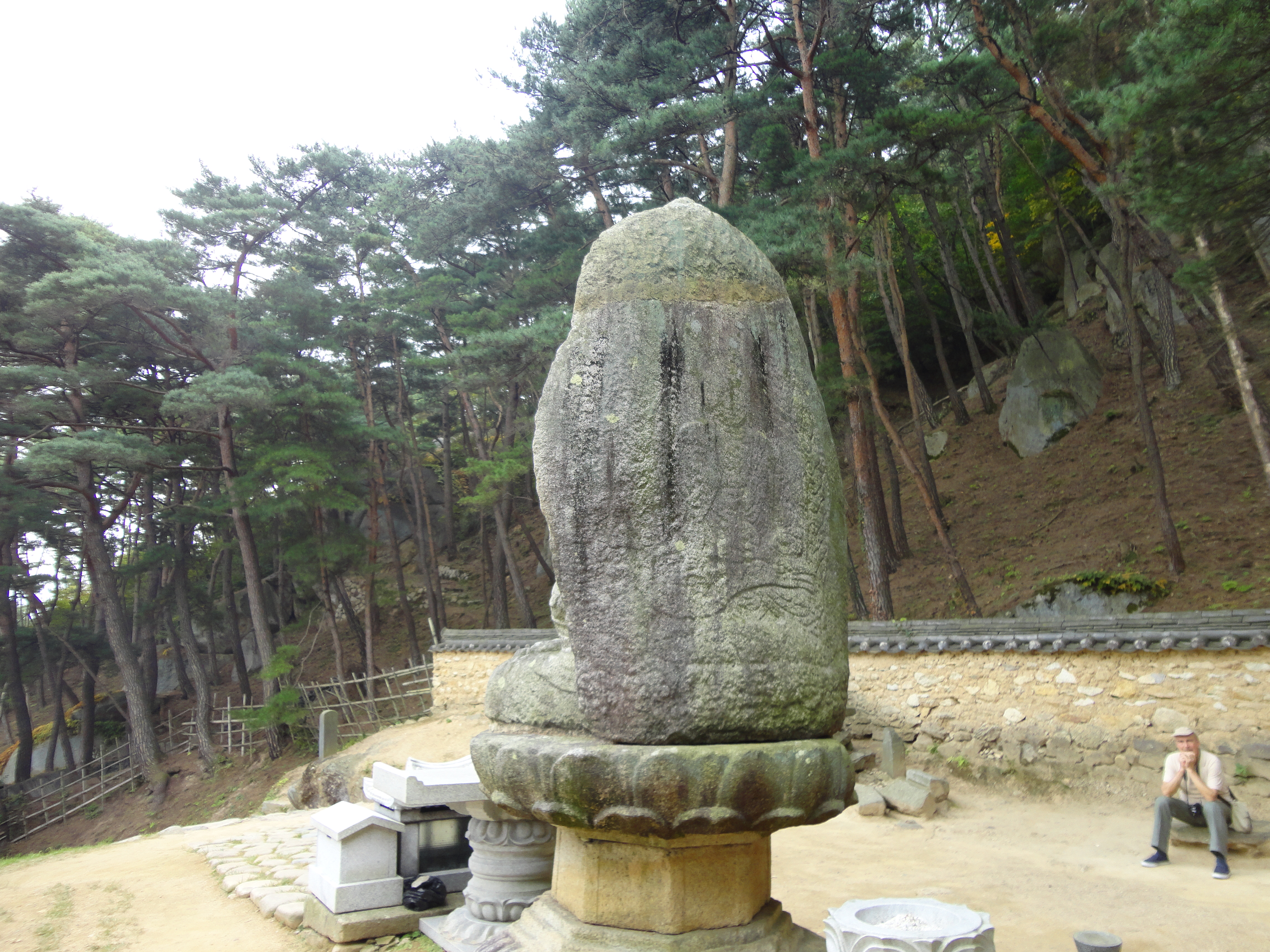
Back

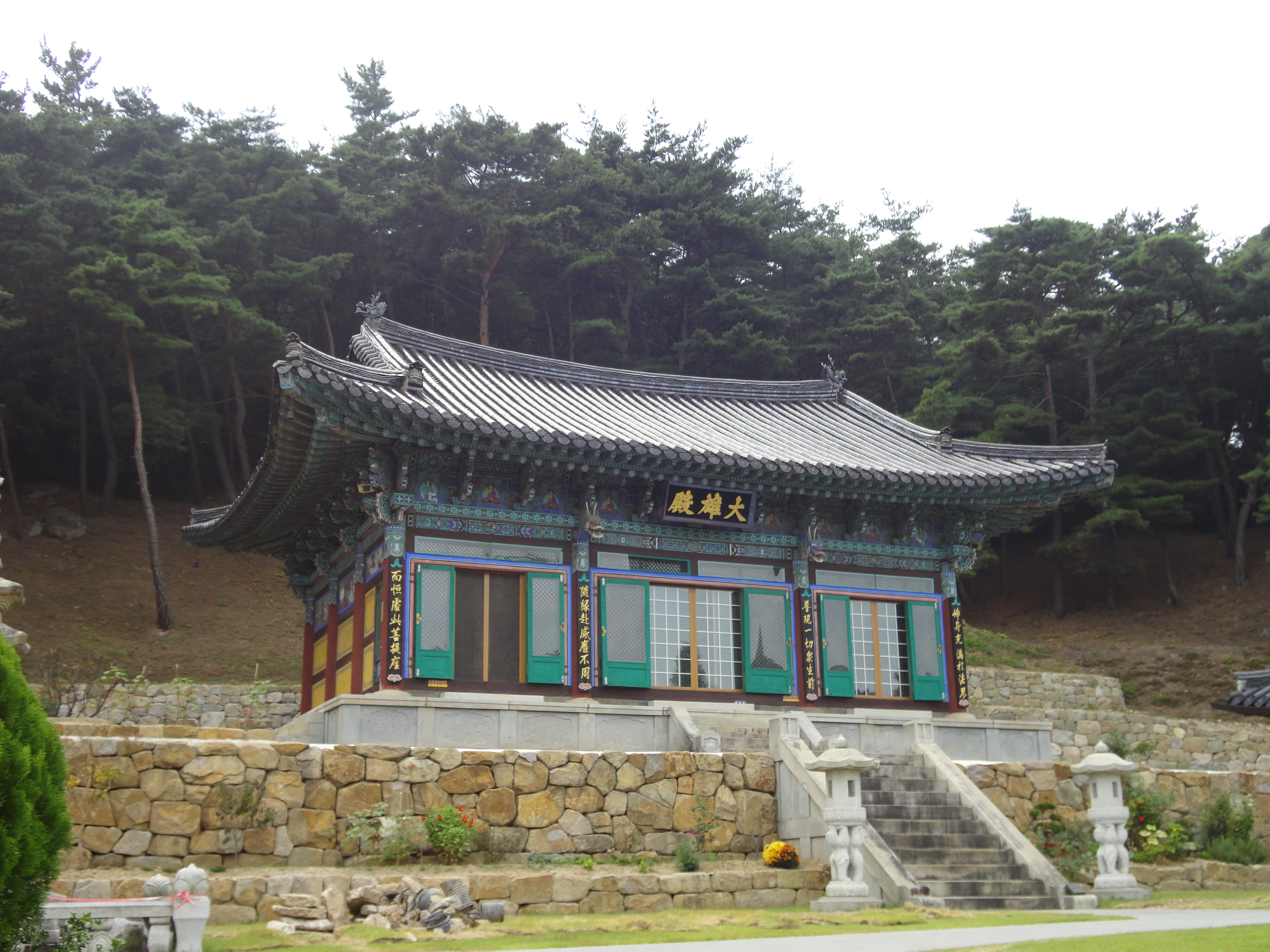
Building 1

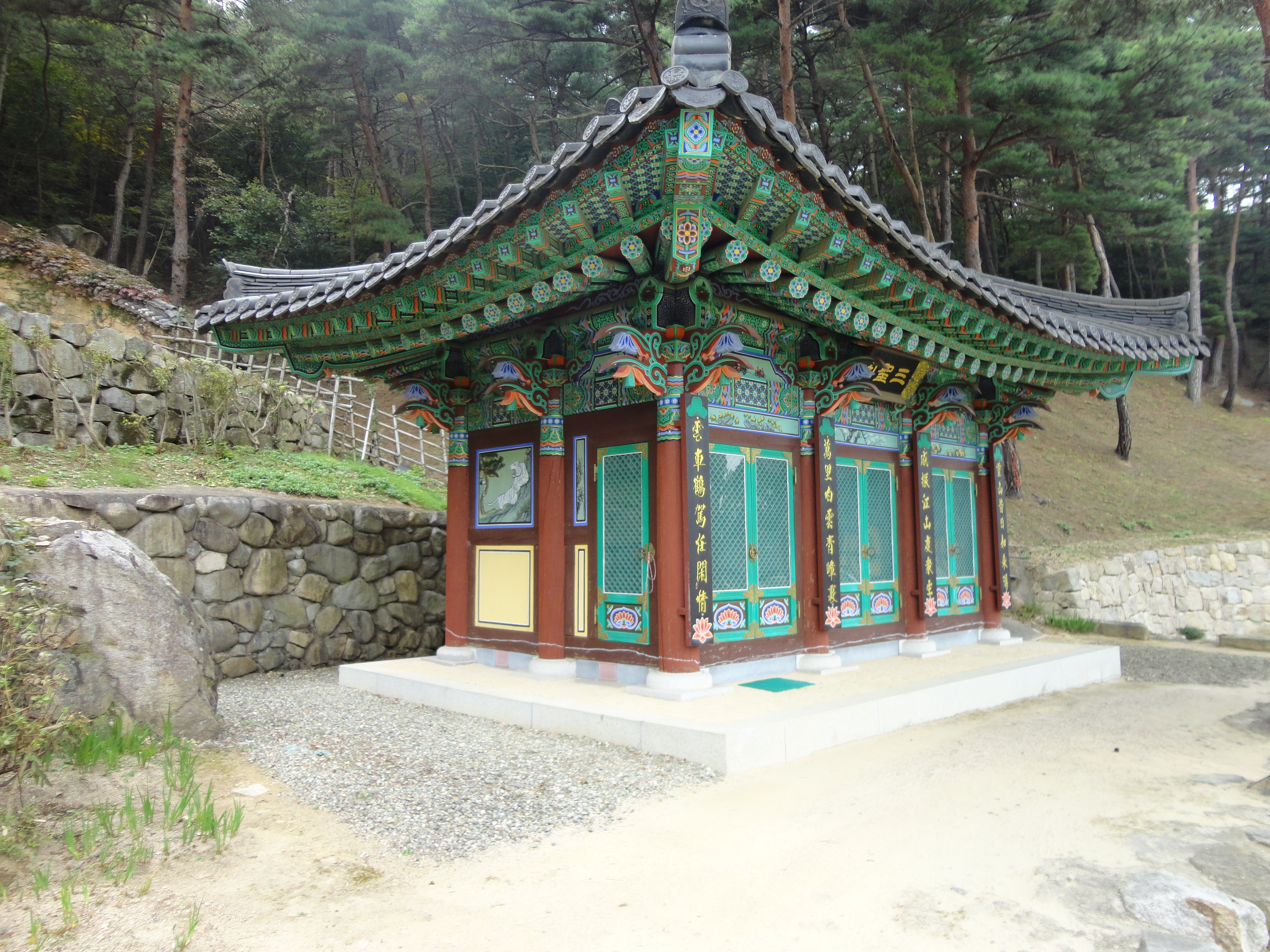
Building 2
