= Gurye County =

Coordinates: 35°12′34″N 127°27′52″E

Gurye
- County
- Panoramic view of Gurye-eup

- Flag Emblem of Gurye

- Location in South Korea
- Country: South Korea
- Region: Honam
- Provincial-level city: Jeonnam-Gwangju
- Administrative divisions: 1 eup, 7 myeon

Area
  - Total: 443.02 km^{2} (171.05 sq mi)

Population (September 2024)
  - Total: 24,056
  - Density: 61.2/km^{2} (159/sq mi)
  - Dialect: Jeolla

Korean name
- Hangul: 구례군
- Hanja: 求禮郡
- RR: Gurye-gun
- MR: Kurye-gun

Gurye County (Korean: 구례군) is a county in Jeonnam-Gwangju, South Korea. Gurye is a small, picturesque farming town situated between Jirisan and the Seomjin River. In the northeastern part of unwavering efforts at the Mt. Jiri. Gurye is the sole designated special tourism and leisure zone in all of Jeollanam-do. The total size of Gurye County is 443.02 square km, with a modest population of approximately 30,000.

Gurye County is a hiking destination during the spring and autumn seasons. The county hosts a number of yearly festivals such as Sansuyu Flower Festival, the Royal Azalea Festival and the Piagol Valley Maple Festival. Gurye is also home to Korea's first national state park, which houses some of Korea's most important temples such as Hwaeomsa, Cheoneunsa, and Yeongoksa.

== Location ==
Gurye is located in the southwest portion of the Korean peninsula, and is easily accessible from Seoul, Busan, Gwangju, as well as other major cities.

== History ==
During the Samhan period, Gurye was part of Gorap, one of the 54 statelets of the Mahan confederacy. As the domain of Baekje Kingdom expanded during the Three Kingdoms period, Gurye was absorbed as one of the kingdom's counties, where it was known as Gucharye (or Guchaji). During the reign of King Gyeongdeok (r. 742–65) of Unified Silla, the region was part of Gokseong County, when it also attained its current name.

== Symbols ==
- Flower : Royal Azaleas
- Tree : Sansuyu tree
- Bird : Pigeon

== Transportation ==
=== Bus ===
Although Gurye is a small county, it is a tourist designated zone and often visited by Koreans year round. The Gurye Bus Terminal located in the center of Gurye-Eup, offers 7 daily bus routes to and from Seoul Nambu Bus Terminal. Each bus departs every 2 hours, with the earliest bus departing at 7:00 a.m. and the latest at 7:00 p.m. The duration of the trip is 3 hours and 35 minutes, which includes a short concession stop midway.

There are numerous buses that depart to Suncheon, the closest city with theaters and large department stores (approx 30 mins away) and to Gwangju, the closest metropolitan city which is 1.5 hours away.

=== Train ===
There is a train station at the opposite end of the Bus Terminal operated by Korail. The Guryegu Station is part of the Jeolla line and is located near Sinwol-ri, approximately 10 minutes by car from the Gurye Bus Terminal. Please refer to the Korail website for specific bus routes, times, and fares.

=== Car ===
Suncheon is the nearest city, and it takes about 20 minutes by car. Gwangju is the closest metropolitan city, which is approximately 1 hour by car.

== Festival ==
Gurye is known for the Sansuyu (Cornus Fruit) Flower Festival. Sansuyu is the fruit of the Cornus officinalis (산수유) which has yellow flowers in early spring. The Sansuyu Flower Festival is held every mid-March and takes place at the hot springs tourist site at the foot of Mount Jiri. The festival features a wide variety of programs including an exhibition of local products made from sansuyu (cornus fruit), performances, hands-on events and fireworks. Sansuyu blossoms produce a uniquely favored tea and fine liquor.

In 2007, more than 500,000 tourists visited during the four-day festival. The Ministry of Culture and Tourism of South Korea chose Gurye's festival as an excellent culture-tour event for the first time.

== Products ==
Sansuyu is a well-known medicinal item from ancient Korean history. The Dongui Bogam, a Joseon Dynasty medical book, said it has several effects such as protecting liver and skin.

The flowers are effective in curing inflammations of the liver, diabetes, high blood pressure, cold hands and feet, and can help enhance the immune system.

== Education ==
Several elementary, middle schools, and high schools are located in Gurye county.

- Gurye Girls' Middle School (구례여자중학교)
- Gurye Boys' Middle School (구례중학교)
- Gurye East Middle School (구례동중학교)
- Gurye North Middle School (구례북중학교)
- Gurye Sandong Middle School (구례산동중학교)

== Sister cities ==
- Geoje, South Korea Since Dec 10, 1998
- Suyeong-gu, Busan, South Korea Since Feb 9th of 1999.
- Guro, Seoul, South Korea
- Chizhou, Anhui, China
- (Japan) Unzen, Nagasaki
- Purwakarta, West Java, Indonesia
