= Baekje Historic Areas =

UNESCO World Heritage Site
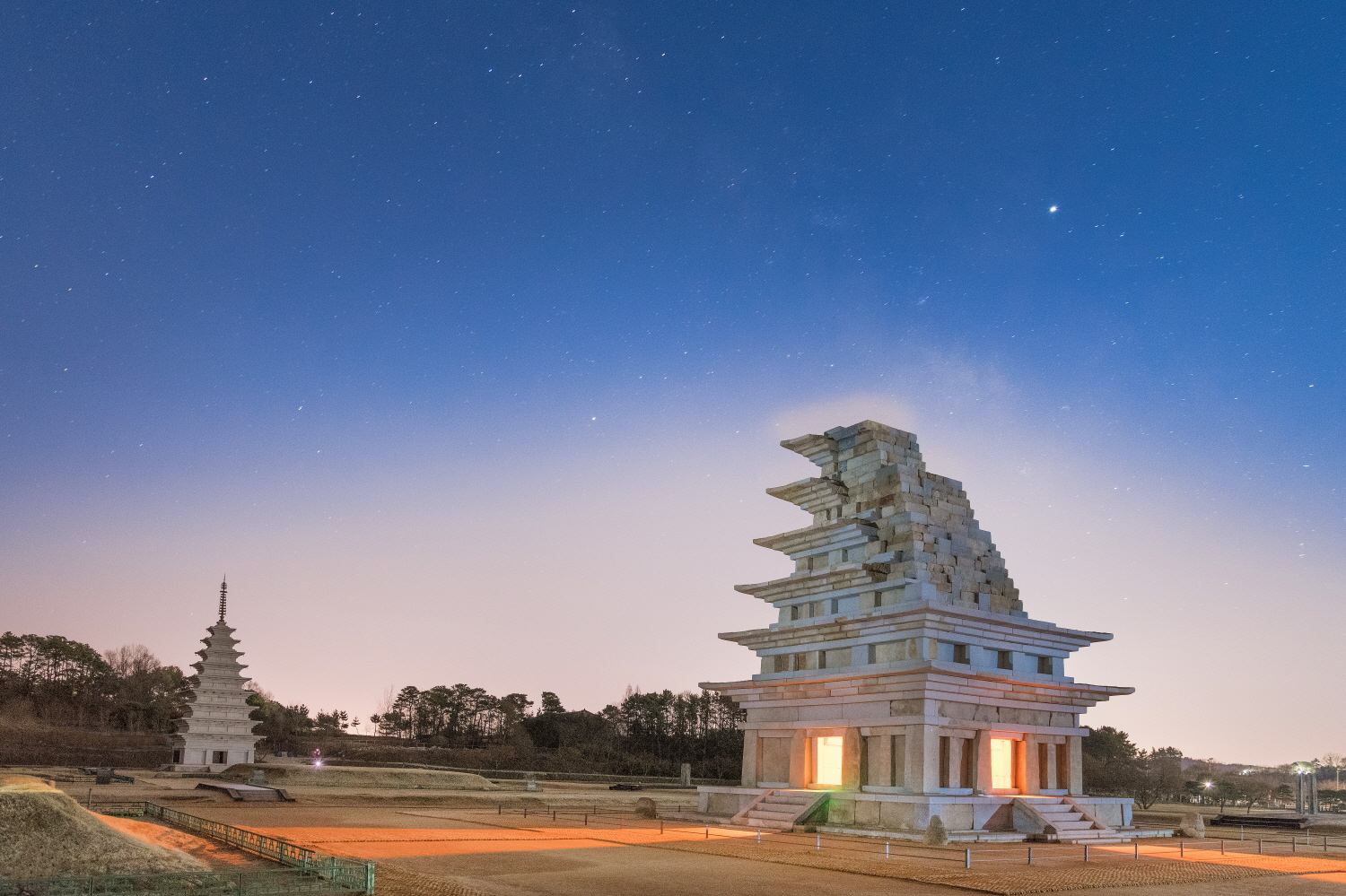
- The temple Mireuksa at night (2019)

- Location within South Korea
- Location: South Korea
- Includes: 1. Gongsanseong Fortress; 2. Royal Tombs in Songsan-ri; 3. Archaeological Site in Gwanbuk-ri and Busosanseong Fortress; 4. Jeongnimsa Temple Site; 5. Royal Tombs in Neungsan-ri; 6. Naseong City Wall; 7. Archaeological Site in Wanggung-ri; 8. Mireuksa Temple Site
- Criteria: Cultural: (ii), (iii)
- Reference: 1477
- Inscription: 2015 (39th Session)
- Area: 135.1 ha (334 acres)
- Buffer zone: 303.64 ha (750.3 acres)
- Coordinates: 36°27′43″N 127°7′38″E

The Baekje Historic Areas (Korean: 백제역사유적지구) is a UNESCO World Heritage Site that consists of eight monuments in three cities in South Korea: Gongju, Buyeo, and Iksan. They relate to the last period of the Koreanic kingdom Baekje (18 BC to 660 CE), representing the period from 475 to 660 CE.

The Baekje Historic Areas were inscribed as a UNESCO World Heritage Site on 8 July 2015 at the 39th session of the Committee. They were inscribed both as a cultural heritage under Criteria II, for the cultural and architectural features which the ancient East Asian kingdoms of Korea evolved in respect of construction methods and Buddhism and exchanged with China and Japan, and under Criteria III, for the extraordinary architecture, culture, religion, and artistry of Baekje in its capital cities, Buddhist shrines and funerary structures, and stone pagodas.

The sites included in the list are the fortress Gongsanseong, the Royal Tombs in Songsan-ri, the fortress Busosanseong and Archaeological Site in Gwanbuk-ri, the temple Jeongnimsa, the Royal Tombs in Neungsan-ri, and the Naseong City Wall, the Archaeological Site in Wanggung-ri, and the temple Mireuksa in Iksan.

== History ==
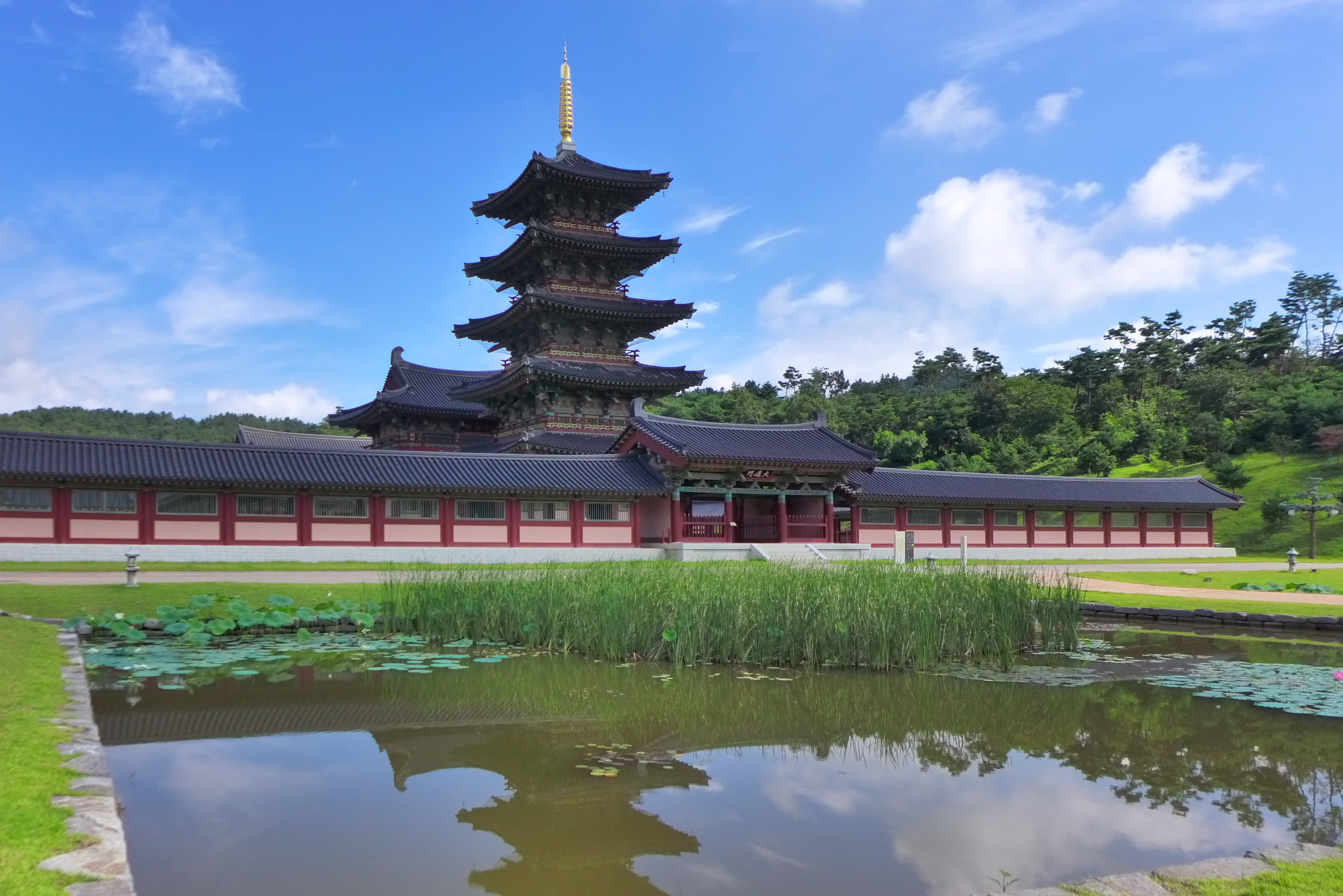
Baekje Cultural Land, Buyeo-gun, Chungcheongnam-do

In Baekje, an ancient kingdom of Korea that flourished for 678 years from 18 BC to 660 AD, interaction with East Asian countries enabled the development of its own unique culture, differing from those of the other two neighboring kingdoms of Goguryeo and Silla. Baekje had been founded on a small area on the banks of the Han River, which is the present-day Seoul (Hanseong), in 18 BC, with population migrating from Goguryeo, and over the years the city was enlarged toward the southwestern part of the country. It became famous culturally and economically. Eventually wars broke out among the three kingdoms, and in the battle Goguryeo won and occupied Baekje, the capital of the Baekje Kingdom. Baekje then relocated from Hanseong to Ungjin, where the Gongsanseong Fortress was erected in 475 AD, and established it as its capital. This relocation facilitated the fledgling state of Baekje to imbibe from Chinese culture and architecture related to city planning, and it also subscribed to Buddhism. Baekje also transmitted its cultural and religious values to Japan, and Ungjin (built in the center of the Geumgang River in the form of a diamond, 130 kilometres (81 mi) to the east of Seoul,) became a powerful influence in East Asia.

However, there was a further movement of the capital to Sabi, and a powerful kingdom came to be established in Buyeo in 538 AD. This relocation was necessary for reasons of trade and commerce, as the main capital did not have this advantage. Here the city was developed with a royal palace, forts, royal burial grounds, and a security cordon of a city wall. During the regime of the Sabi period (538–660 AD), King Seong shifted the capital to Buyeo in 538. Iksan was established as a second capital for administrative purposes. In 660 AD, Baekje suffered defeat at the hands of the Silla, who had aligned with the Tang dynasty of China.

Buddhism found its way to Baekje from China for the first time in the late 4th century. In the 6th century, Gyeomik, a Buddhist monk of Baekje, went to India to learn more about Buddhism and bring back the scriptures, which were translated to the local language. Buddhist philosophy spread widely among all sectors of the society, and the ruler considered himself as Buddha to exercise royal control over his subjects. During this period, many large Buddhist temples and pagodas were built in Baekje. This also enabled a close interaction with China and Japan, not only in the field of religion and philosophy but also in building temples in these countries during the 5th to 7th centuries. This period also witnessed the emergence of East Asia as a "geo-cultural circle" with a uniform writing pattern with Chinese characters, practice of Buddhism, and adoption of Confucian legal codes. The city prospered for nearly 700 years from 18 BC to 660 AD with its neighbouring kingdoms of Goguryeo to the north and Silla to the east.

The historic monuments of the period of Baekje were buried; upon excavation, they were found in a well-preserved condition. These were recorded by the Government of Korea as Heritage sites under the 1962 Cultural Heritage Protection Act, amended 2012, and the 2004 Special Act on the Preservation and Promotion of Ancient Cities, amended 2013. The sites have also been brought under the purview of local governments' Cultural Heritage Protection Ordinances such as the South Chungcheong Province of 2002 and North Jeolla Province of 1999.

A special organization called the Baekje Historic Areas Conservation and Management Foundation has been set up with all stakeholders on board; central, provincial, and local governments and community associations are involved. An overall Conservation and Management Plan for 2015–2019 has also been put in place to ensure that the "Outstanding Universal Value" of the monuments in the inscribed property are well preserved with an appropriate Tourism Management Plan for the sites.

== Features ==
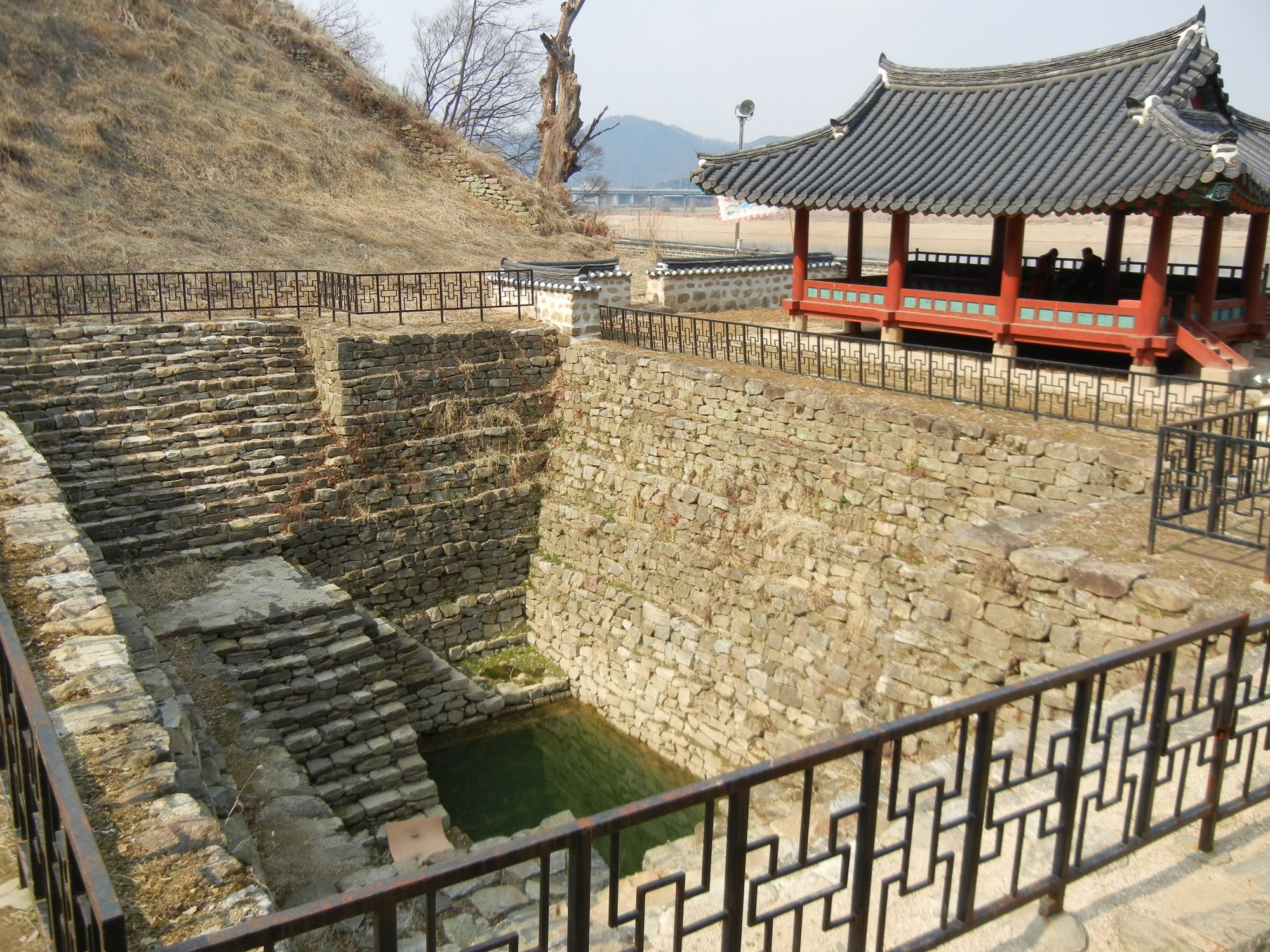
Gongsanseong Fortress of Gongju

The eight sites featured in the heritage list are elaborated.

The Gongju Gongsanseong Fortress was initially known as Ungjinseong and subsequently as Gongsanseong during the reign of the Goryeo dynasty. It occupies an area of 20 hectares (49 acres), presently in the Geumseong-dong and Sanseong-dong districts. It was unearthed during the archaeological excavations done after 1980s, when the constriction methods in building the forts's rampart, the royal palace, and the associated structures of the royal palace were revealed. The fort is located atop the Gongsan mountain (elevation 110 metres (360 ft)) and extends over a length of 2,666 metres (8,747 ft), with its stone wall in 1,925 metres (6,316 ft) length and the balance 735 metres (2,411 ft) made of earth. It was built as a defense fortification adapted to the local topography by linking mountain peaks and bridging the valleys. Following the collapse of the Baekje empire, the ramparts were rebuilt fully as stone walls. The fortress has been illuminated. It functioned both as a defense structure and a royal palace.

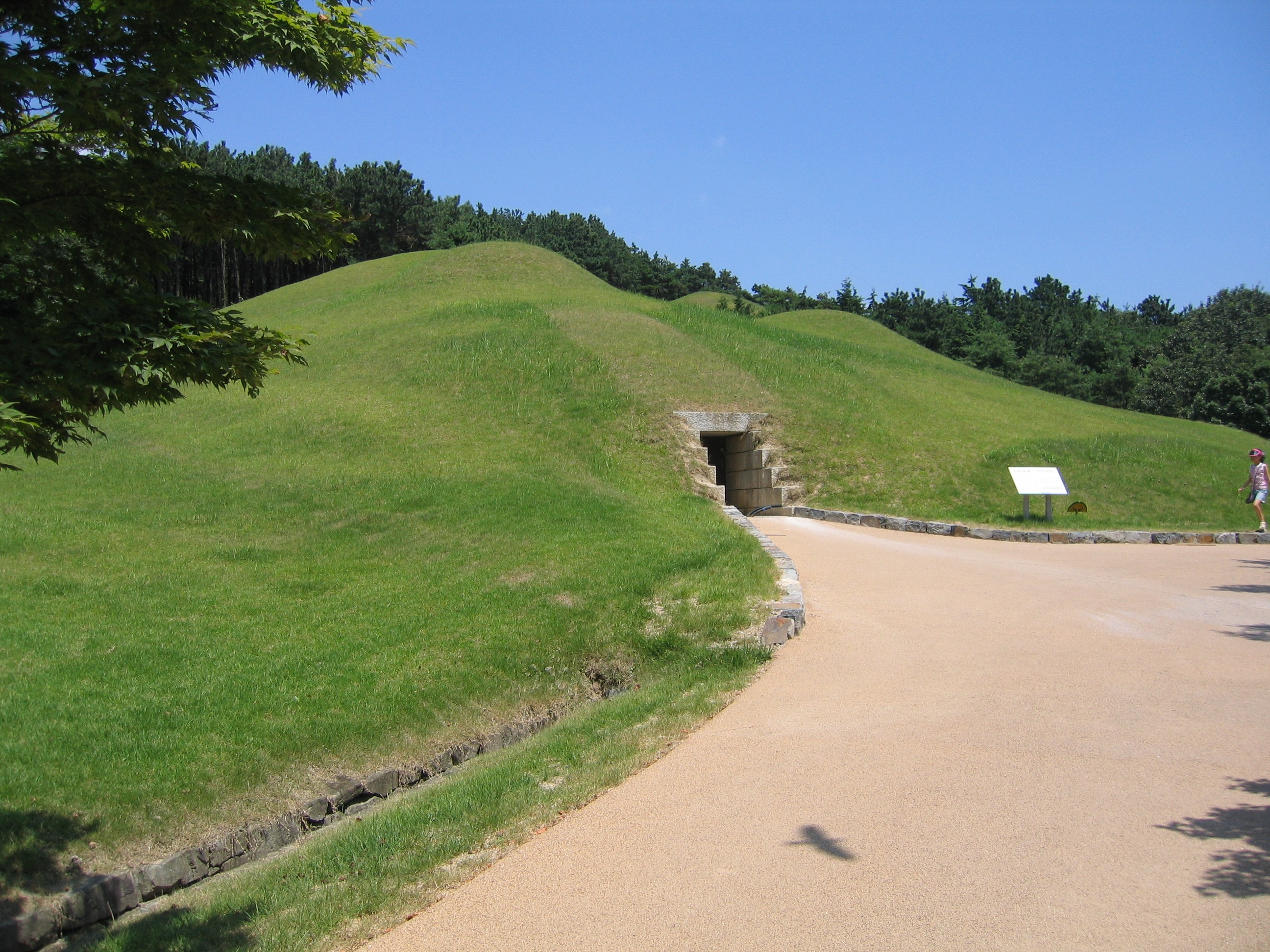
Tomb of King Muryeong, a royal tomb at Songsan-ri

The Royal Tomb of King Muryeong belongs to the 25th king of Baekje. It is also known as the Royal Tombs in Songsan-ri or the Royal Tombs of Baekje. It is located on top of a small hill (elevation 75 metres (246 ft)) on the southern side of the Geumgang River. It was unearthed in 1971 in an intact condition, though some excavations had been carried out in 1927 and 1932. When excavated, the King's tomb was found in a well-preserved state with its more than 4,600 antiquities in good condition. The King's queen was also buried here. This was part of six other tombs found among the Royal Tombs at Songsan-ri. The tombs were built around 475 AD after the capital was relocated. The tomb of the King and the tomb no 6 are made of bricks with a vaulted ceiling, while the other five tombs were built as stone chambers with domed ceilings.

The Busosanseong Fortress, located on a small hill, was known in the early period as Sabiseong. It formed the backyard garden of the royal palace and was an emergency escape route. Archaeological excavations carried out in 1993 unearthed this fort. It is situated on the Busosan Mountain (elevation 106 metres (348 ft)) located on the northern extremity of Buyeo, on the west bank of the Geumgang River. The fort wall has a perimeter of 2,495 metres (8,186 ft) with a base width of 5 to 6 metres (16 to 20 ft), and it is 3 metres (9.8 ft) in height built by the rammed earth method. It has two gates, one on the south and the other on the east; the south gate is the main gate. The finds here also indicate that the fort was in use as a military establishment for more than 1,000 years. The 'Nakhwaam Rock', meaning "Rock of Falling Flowers", a rock ledge, is known for the Baekje's tragic legend of 3,000 royal ladies committing suicide by jumping off the cliff.

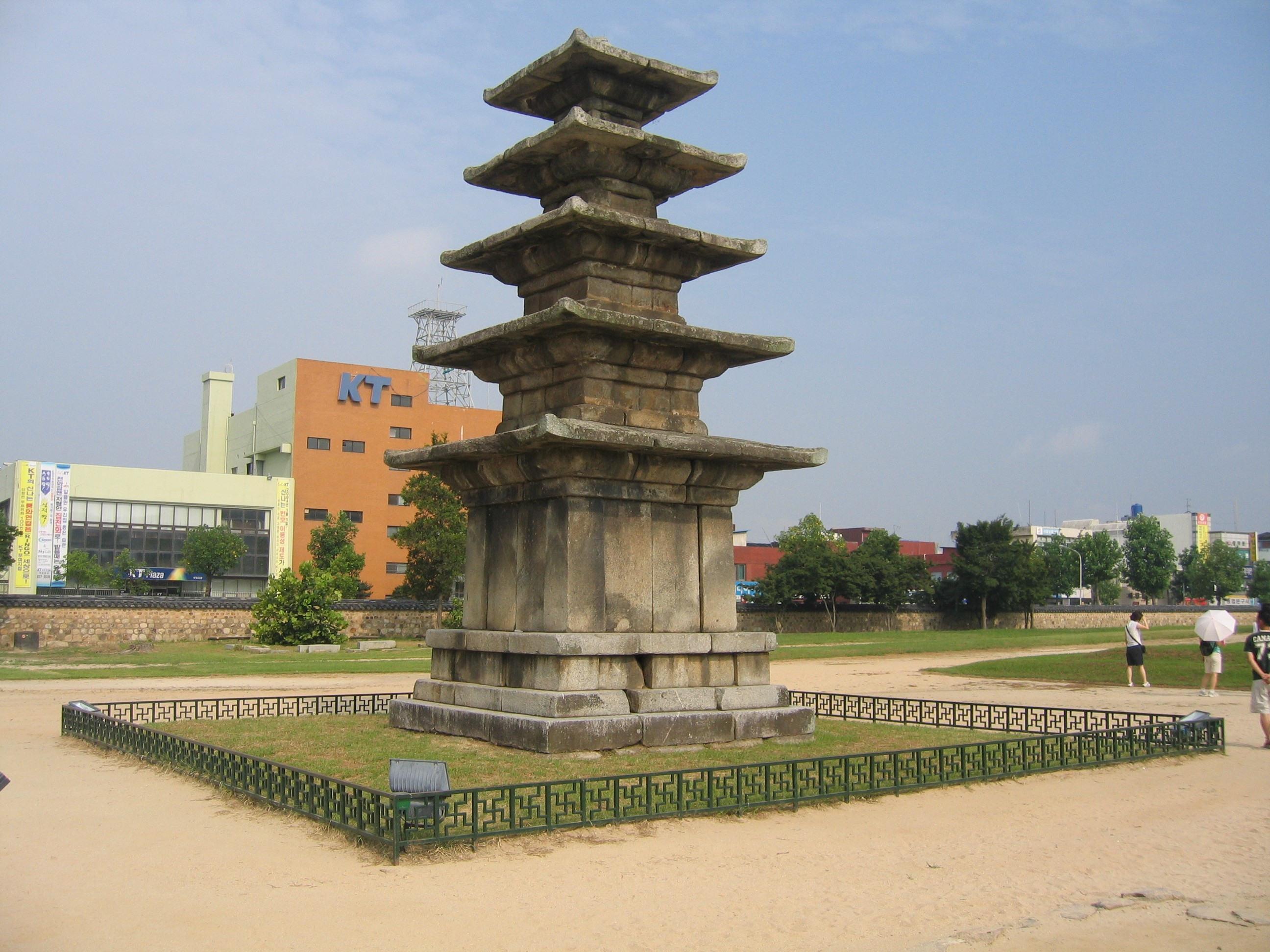
The five-storied pagoda of Jeongnimsa

The Jeongnimsa Temple Site layout is a popular architectural layout throughout Korea and has a "pagoda–prayer hall–lecture hall layout". It is located on a flat terrain and is in the backdrop of the Geumseongsan Mountain to the east and Busosan Mountain to the north. Built during the Sabi period, the temple has engravings on the pagoda that memorialize the Tang dynasty's victory over Baekje. The temple has a layout of a central gate, prayer and lecture halls, and the monks' residential area, all linked by passages. The buildings were made of wood founded over tiled plinths. The site has a five-story pagoda, 8 metres (26 ft) in height with a low platform and a high main body on its first level, and with reducing size at further higher levels. Other archaeological finds include many roof tiles and clay figurines.

In the Mireuksaji Seoktap site, the temple is a large stone pagoda which is considered the largest temple site not only in Korea but in the whole of East Asia. The eastern tower of the pagoda was refurbished in 1993. The west tower was also under restoration. The Pagoda is well preserved.

The Royal Tombs in Neungsan-ri exhibit a change in the architectural style of the ceiling from vaulted to flat. The tombs were excavated between 1915 and 1917. Seven tombs were unearthed here, with six arranged in two rows and the seventh located 50 metres (160 ft) away. Three tombs have stone chambers with a passage and with vaulted ceilings in hexagonal and square designs.

The Naseong City Wall built to defend the city is 6.3 kilometres (3.9 mi) in length and constructed of earth and stone. It provided security to the northern and eastern part of Sabi. The wall was built with rammed-earth technology, which was then innovative. The eastern part of the wall has been refurbished. The earthen walls have been built with wood planks, twigs, and leaves along certain stretches. Excavations revealed the main gate on the eastern part of Buyeo, next to the Royal Tombs in Neungsan-ri, which was of 9.5 metres (31 ft) width built with rectangular stones. Another gate located 800 metres (2,600 ft) away was also found in 2013.

The Temple Site of Busosan Mountain has on its southwestern slope a Buddhist temple unearthed during excavations in 1980. The temple covers an area of 3,500 square metres (38,000 sq ft). It has one pagoda and one prayer hall layout. Among the artifacts found here is a gilt-bronze waist belt that is believed to have belonged to a person of high rank.

=== List ===
Baekje Historic Areas
UNESCO ID	English name	Korean name	Location	Picture	Note
1477-001	Gongsanseong Fortress	공산성	Gongju, South Chungcheong Province		
1477-002	Royal Tombs in Songsan-ri	공주 무령왕릉과 왕릉원	Gongju, South Chungcheong Province		
1477-003	Archaeological Site in Gwanbuk-ri; Busosanseong Fortress	관북리 유적 부소산성	Buyeo County, South Chungcheong Province		
1477-004	Jeongnimsa	정림사지	Buyeo County, South Chungcheong Province		
1477-005	Royal Tombs in Neungsan-ri	왕릉원	Buyeo County, South Chungcheong Province		
1477-006	Naseong City Wall	부여나성	Buyeo County, South Chungcheong Province		
1477-007	Archaeological Site in Wanggung-ri	왕궁리 유적	Iksan, North Jeolla Province		
1477-008	Mireuksa	미륵사지	Iksan, North Jeolla Province		
