= Jeongnimsa =

Former temple in Buyeo, South Korea

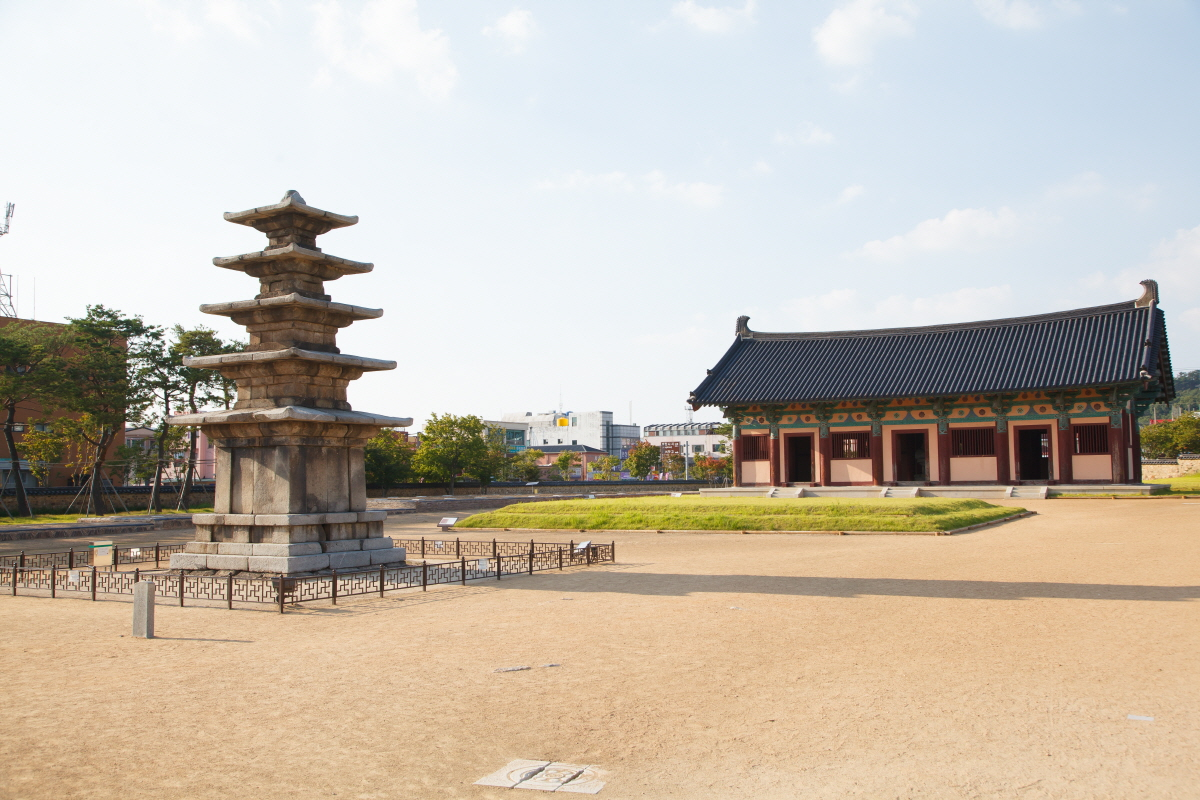
- The five-storied pagoda in the temple (2015)

Religion
- Affiliation: Korean Buddhism

Location
- Location: Buyeo County, South Chungcheong Province, South Korea
- Interactive map of Jeongnimsa
- Coordinates: 36°16′46″N 126°54′48″E
- UNESCO World Heritage Site
- Criteria: Cultural: (ii), (iii)
- Designated: 2015
- Parent listing: Baekje Historic Areas
- Reference no.: 1477-004
- Historic Sites of South Korea
- Official name: Jeongnimsa Temple Site, Buyeo
- Designated: 1983-03-26
- Reference no.: 301

Jeongnimsa (Korean: 정림사; Hanja: 定林寺) was a major Buddhist temple in the Baekje capital of Sabi, now located in Buyeo County, South Chungcheong Province, South Korea. It was constructed in 538 and continued to be used in to the Goryeo period (918–1392). In 2015, it was made a UNESCO World Heritage Site, as part of the item Baekje Historic Areas. On March 26, 1983, it was made a Historic Site of South Korea.

Currently the temple's former site is occupied by a museum called the Jeongnimsaji Museum (정림사지박물관).

== History ==
The temple was built in the middle of Sabi when the city was established in 538 (Korean calendar). The city was then surrounded by a city wall. The temple was likely among the most significant in the city, and was placed intentionally relative to the city's royal palace. It had ponds on its east and west sides. It continued to be used into the Goryeo period.

In 1933, a building was constructed to protect a historic stone Buddha statue in the temple. It was first excavated in 1942 during the 1910–1945 Japanese colonial period. That year, the name of the temple was confirmed when Japanese archaeologist Fujisawa Kazuo (藤澤一夫) found an inscription with the temple's name at its ruins: "8th year of Taepyeong, Mujin Jeongnimsa Temple Daejangdangcho" (太平八年戊辰定林寺大藏當草). The inscription commemorates the rebuilding of a building "Daejangdang" in the temple in the year 1028, during the Goryeo period. The site was excavated by Chungnam National University's museum in 1979 and 1980. Excavations from 2008 to 2010 by the Buyeo National Research Institute of Cultural Heritage discovered the sites of buildings.

== Current status ==
Extant remains of the temple include a five-storied stone pagoda, which is a National Treasure of South Korea, and a stone seated Buddha statue, which is a Treasure of South Korea. The latter is from the Goryeo period.
