= Hongsan Sun clan =

Korean clan from South Chungcheong Province

- Country: Korea
- Current region: Buyeo County
- Founder: Sun Gyeong jin

Hongsan Sun clan (Korean: 홍산 순씨; Hanja: 鴻山 荀氏) was one of the Korean clans. Their Bon-gwan was in Buyeo County, South Chungcheong Province. According to the research in 2015, the number of Hongsan Sun clan was 951. Sun clan was born in Henan, China. King Wen of Zhou in Zhou dynasty appointed his son as Sunhu (Hanja: 荀侯) and began Sun clan. Hongsan Sun clan’s founder was born as a member of Sun clan. His name was Sun Gyeong jin who was a Jinshi (Hanja: 进士) in Goryeo.

== See also ==
- Korean clan names of foreign origin
