= Naseong City Wall =

Ancient walls in Buyeo, South Korea

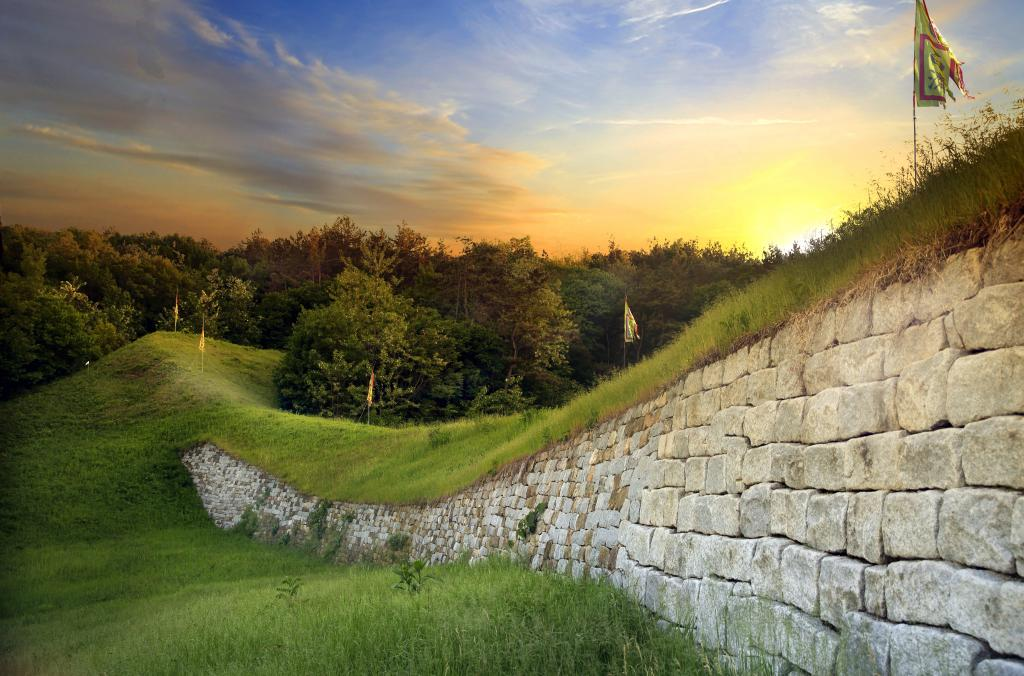
- Part of the wall (2020)
- Interactive map of Naseong City Wall
- 36°16′40″N 126°56′24″E
- Location: Buyeo County, South Chungcheong Province, South Korea

UNESCO World Heritage Site
- Criteria: Cultural: (ii), (iii)
- Designated: 2015
- Part of: Baekje Historic Areas

Historic Sites of South Korea
- Official name: Outer City Wall, Buyeo
- Designated: 1963-01-21
- Reference no.: 58

The Naseong City Wall (Korean: 나성; Hanja: 羅城) is a Baekje-era wall in Buyeo County, South Chungcheong Province, South Korea. On January 21, 1963, they were made Historic Site of South Korea No. 58. They are part of the UNESCO World Heritage Site Baekje Historic Areas.

The walls were built possibly around 538 (Korean calendar) to defend Sabi, the capital of Baekje. The walls were constructed just before the city was well-established, and continued to be constructed and fortified after that. The walls were presumed to surround the city, but currently only parts of the northern and eastern section remain. No physical evidence for the western and southern sections are known. The known sections are around 6.6 km (4.1 mi) in length. The known wall section starts from the north gate of the fortress Busosanseong and continues southeast and south.

Excavations began on the wall in 1991. More than 30 were conducted thereafter.

== Gallery ==
A portion of the wall (2017)

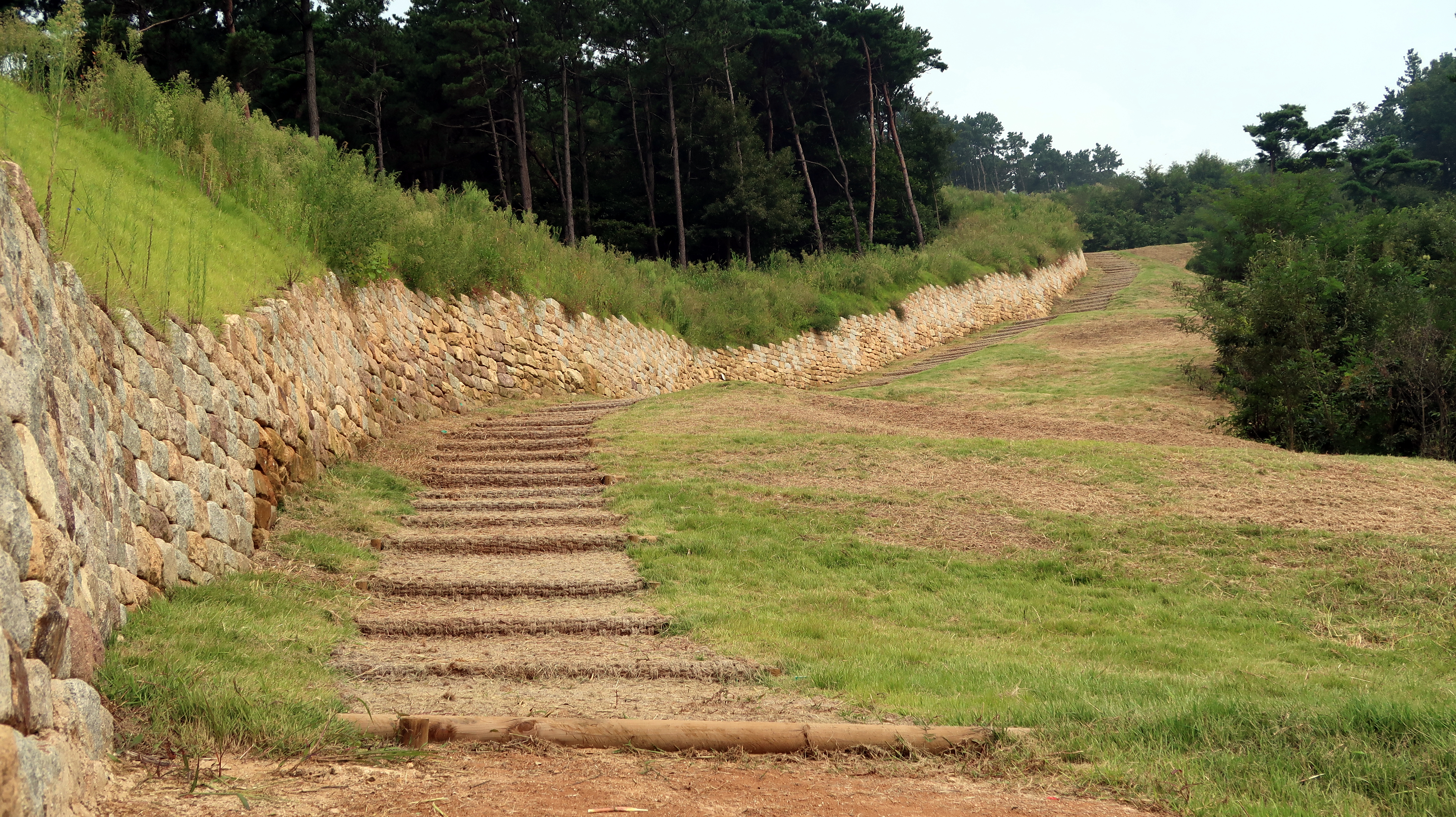
A walking path along the wall (2017)
