= Buyeo Royal Tombs =

Tombs in Buyeo County, South Korea

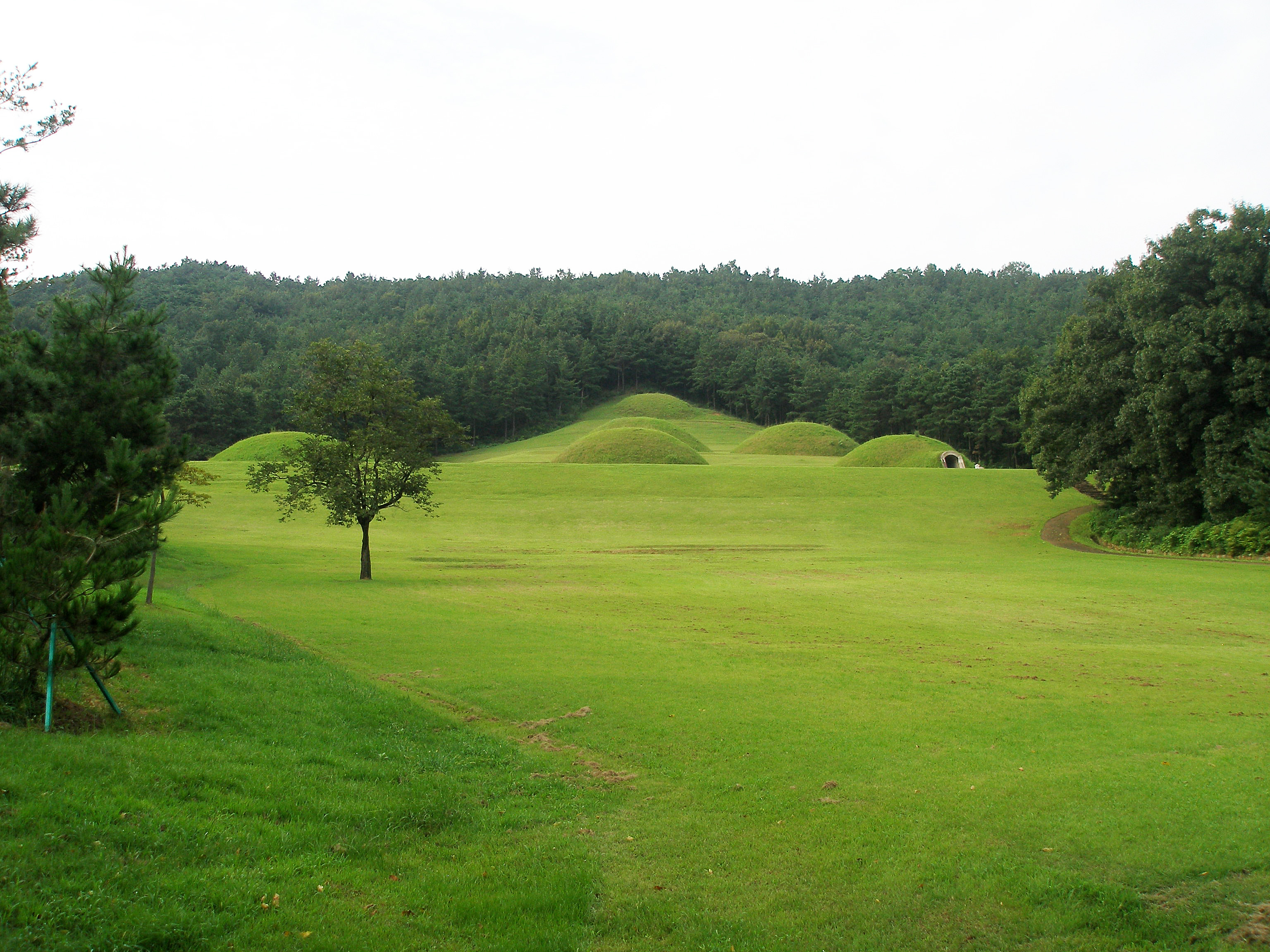
- The tombs (2010)
- Interactive map of Buyeo Royal Tombs
- Location: Neungsan-ri, Buyeo County, South Chungcheong Province, South Korea

UNESCO World Heritage Site
- Criteria: Cultural: (ii), (iii)
- Designated: 2015
- Part of: Baekje Historic Areas
- Reference no.: 1477-005

Historic Sites of South Korea
- Official name: Buyeo Royal Tombs
- Designated: 1963-01-21
- Reference no.: 14

There are a number of Baekje-era royal tumuli tombs in Neungsan-ri, Buyeo County, South Chungcheong Province, South Korea. They are located on the mountain Neungsallisan. On January 21, 1963, they were made Historic Site of South Korea No. 14.

The first excavation on the tombs was in 1915, during the 1910–1945 Japanese colonial period. Japanese person Kuroita Katsumi (黑板勝美) excavated tombs no. 2 and 3. Tomb 5 was also excavated that year. In 1917, tombs 1, 4, and 6 were excavated. By then, much of the tombs had been looted. A few artifacts were discovered in tombs no. 5 and 2. Tomb no. 7 was discovered in 1971, during repair work.
