= Karimsŏng =

Fortress in Buyeo County, South Korea

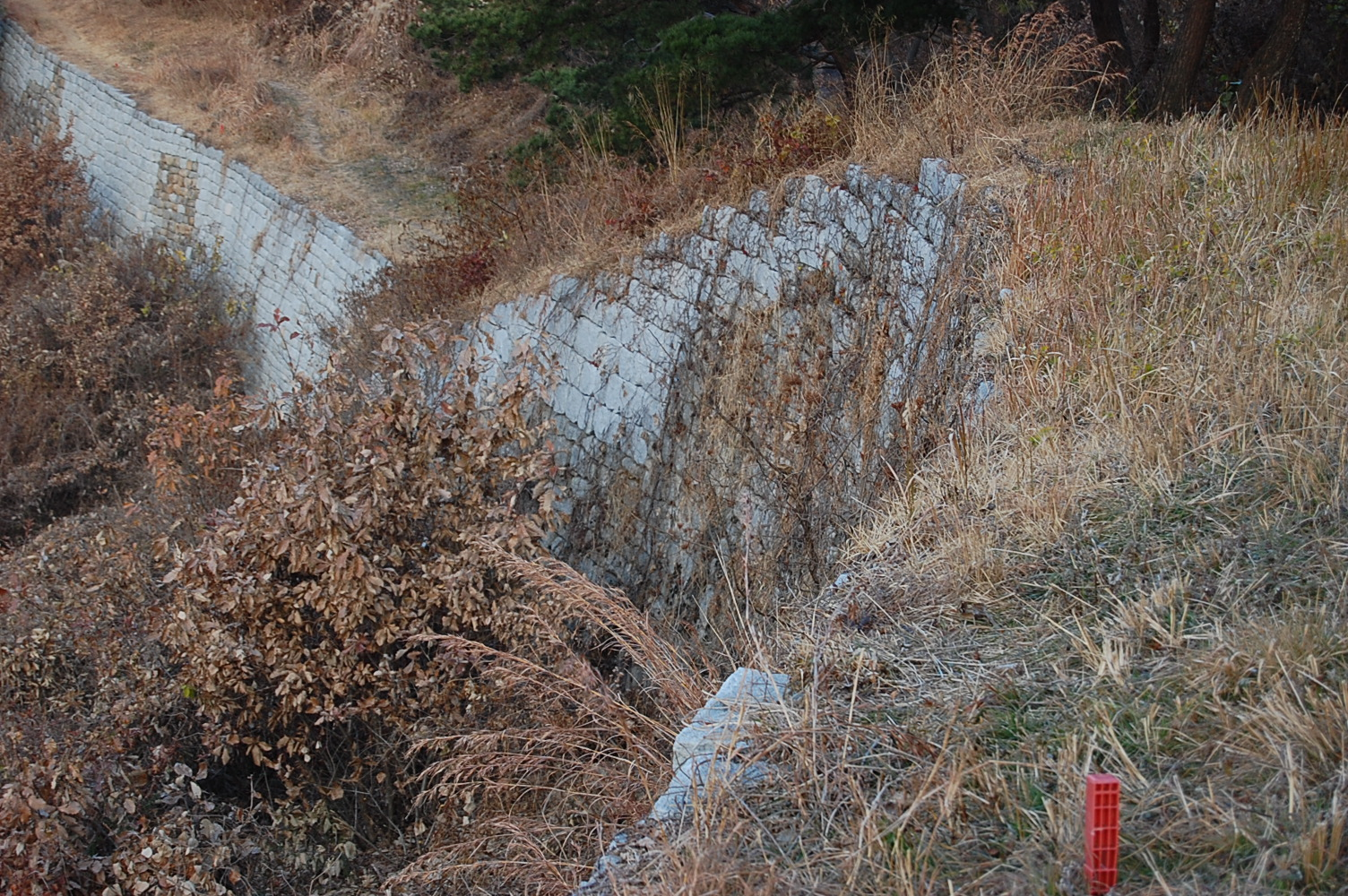
- Part of the fortress remains (2008)
- Interactive map of Karimsŏng
- Location: Buyeo County, South Chungcheong Province, South Korea
- Coordinates: 36.1970°N 126.8998°E
- Built: 501 (Korean calendar)

Historic Sites of South Korea
- Official name: Garimseong Fortress, Buyeo
- Designated: 1963-01-21
- Reference no.: 4

Karimsŏng (Korean: 가림성; Hanja: 加林城; RR: Garimseong) was a Baekje-era Korean mountain fortress built on the mountain Seongheungsan (성흥산) in what is now Buyeo County, South Chungcheong Province, South Korea. It was first completed in 501 (Korean calendar). It is attested to in the Samguk sagi. It was used to protect two successive capitals of Baekje. On January 21, 1963, it was designated Historic Site of South Korea No. 4.
