= Royal Tombs in Songsan-ri =

Baekje tombs in Gongju, South Korea

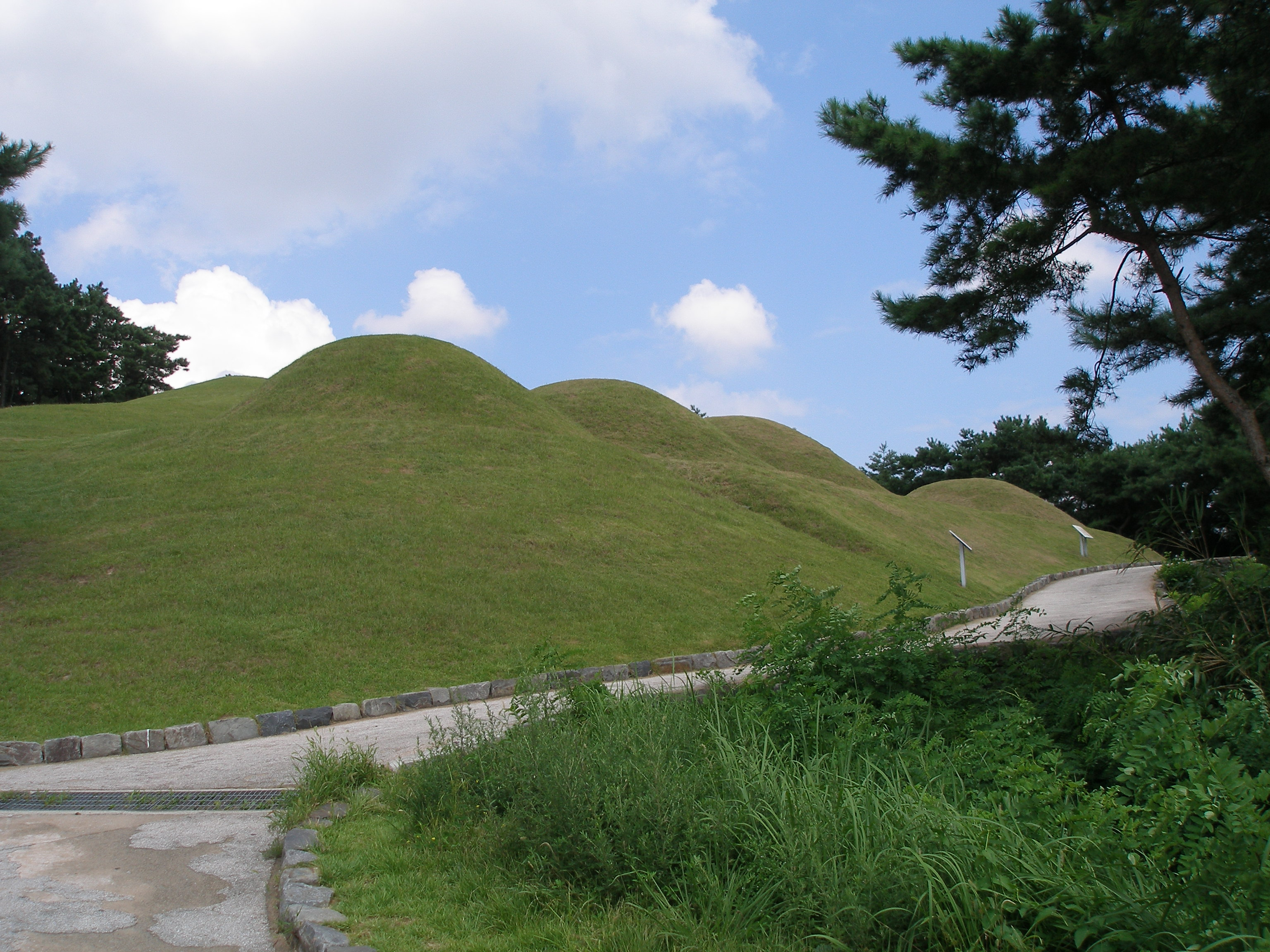
- Tombs 1 to 4 (2010)
- Interactive map of Royal Tombs in Songsan-ri
- Location: Gongju, South Korea
- Coordinates: 36°27′38″N 127°06′46″E

UNESCO World Heritage Site
- Criteria: Cultural: (ii), (iii)
- Designated: 2015
- Part of: Baekje Historic Areas
- Reference no.: 1477-002

Historic Sites of South Korea
- Official name: Tomb of King Muryeong and Royal Tombs, Gongju
- Designated: 1963-01-21
- Reference no.: 13

There are a number of Baekje-era royal tombs in Songsan-ri (now called Ungjin-dong), Gongju, South Korea.

On January 21, 1963, they were designated Historic Site of South Korea No. 13.

== Description ==
The first excavation on the tombs was in 1927, during the 1910–1945 Japanese colonial period. Tombs No. 1 to 5 were investigated during this time; they were more visually obviously exposed to the open. One such investigation in the 1920s was illegally conducted by Karube Jion (輕部慈恩), a local Japanese high school teacher. More occurred in 1932 or 1933, but records of this investigation are poor.

There are currently seven tombs open for viewing in the area. The 1930s investigations reported that there were at least 20 tombs in the area; many of these tombs have yet to be confirmed, and future excavation efforts have been planned.

Notable among these tombs is tomb No. 7, the tomb of King Muryeong.

== Gallery ==
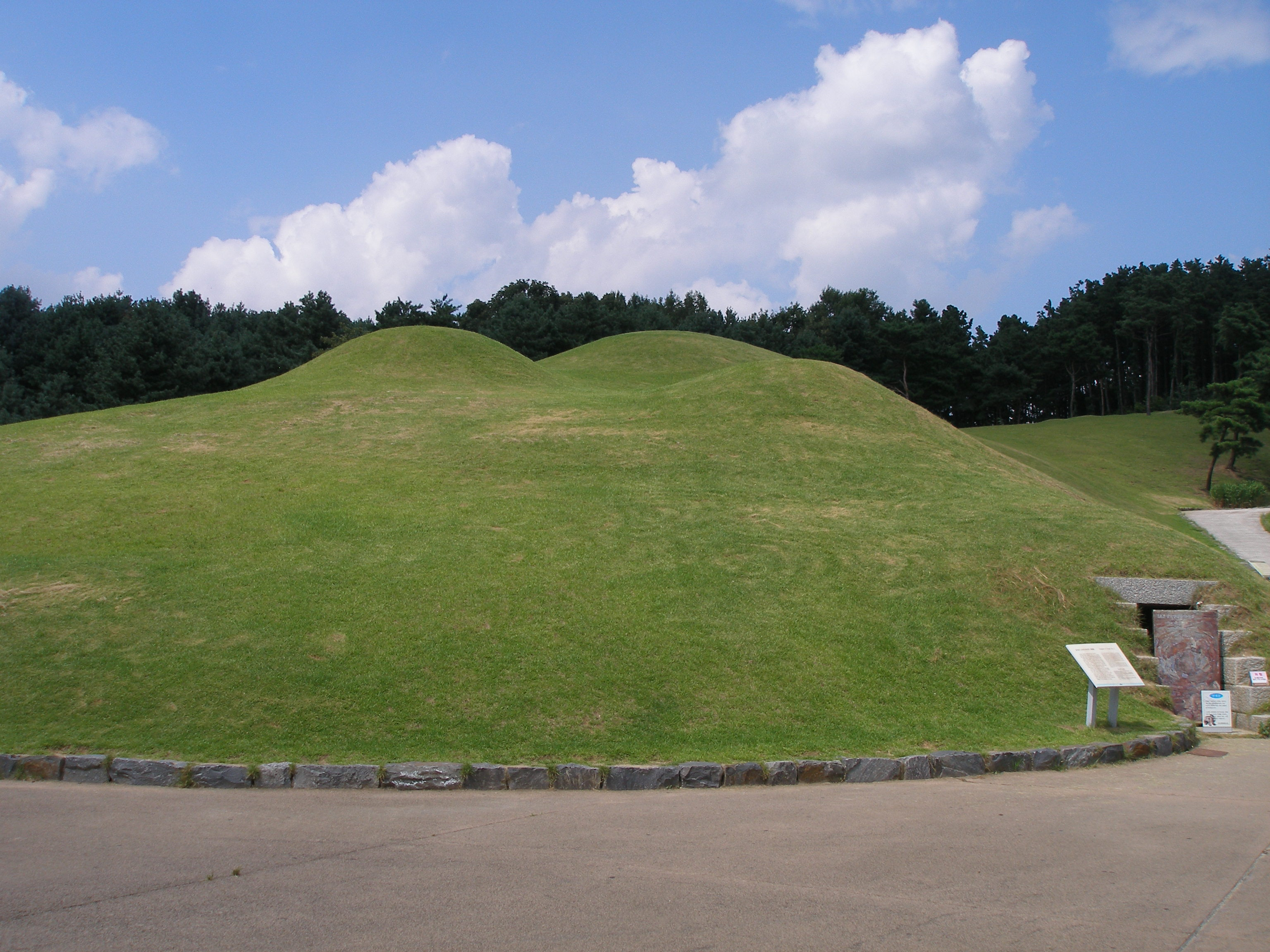
Tombs No. 5 and 6 (2010)

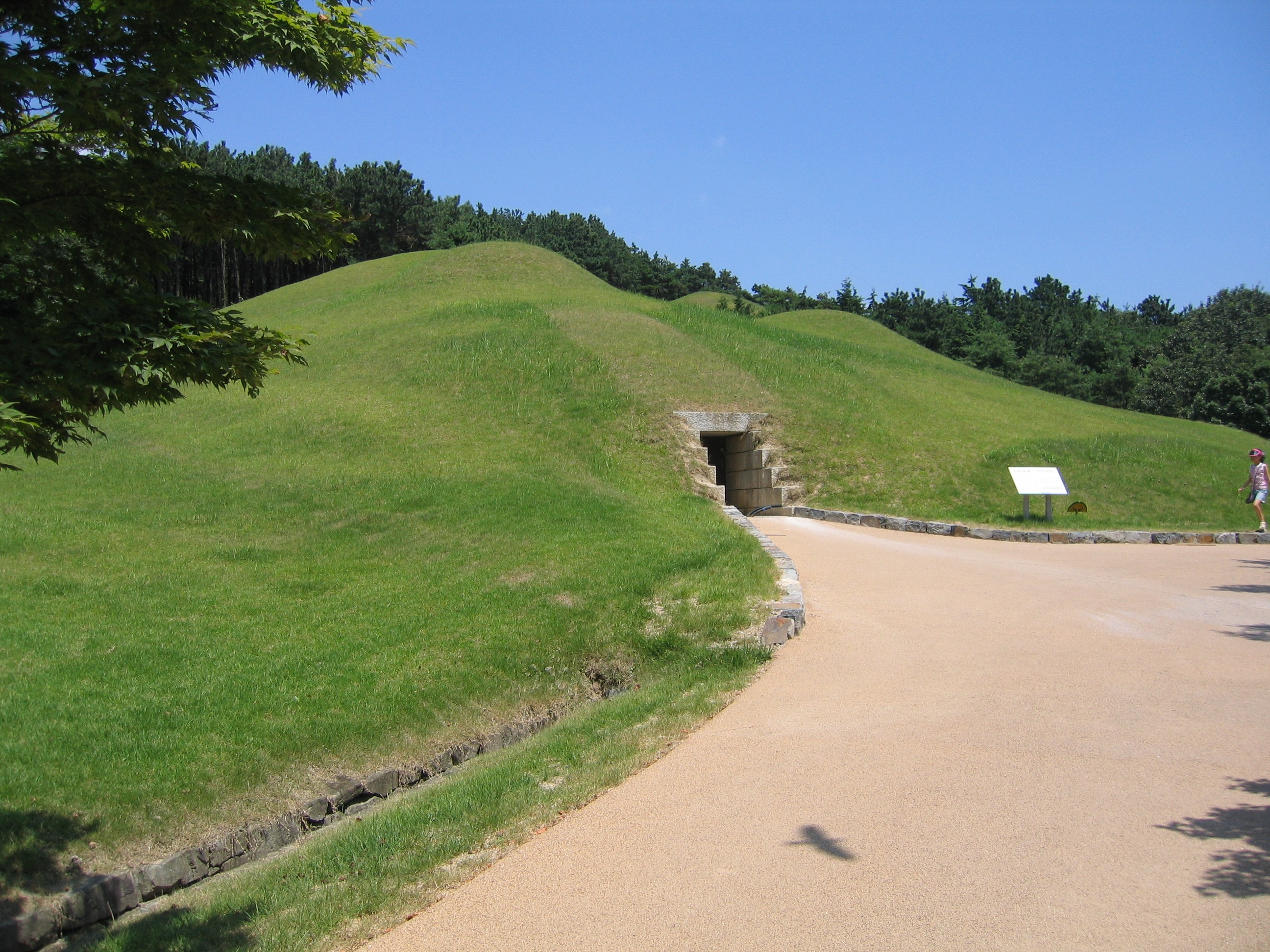
The tomb of King Muryeong (2011)
