= Five-storied stone pagoda of Jeongnimsa =

Baekje-era pagoda in Buyeo, South Korea

Five-story Stone Pagoda at Jeongnimsa Temple Site, Buyeo
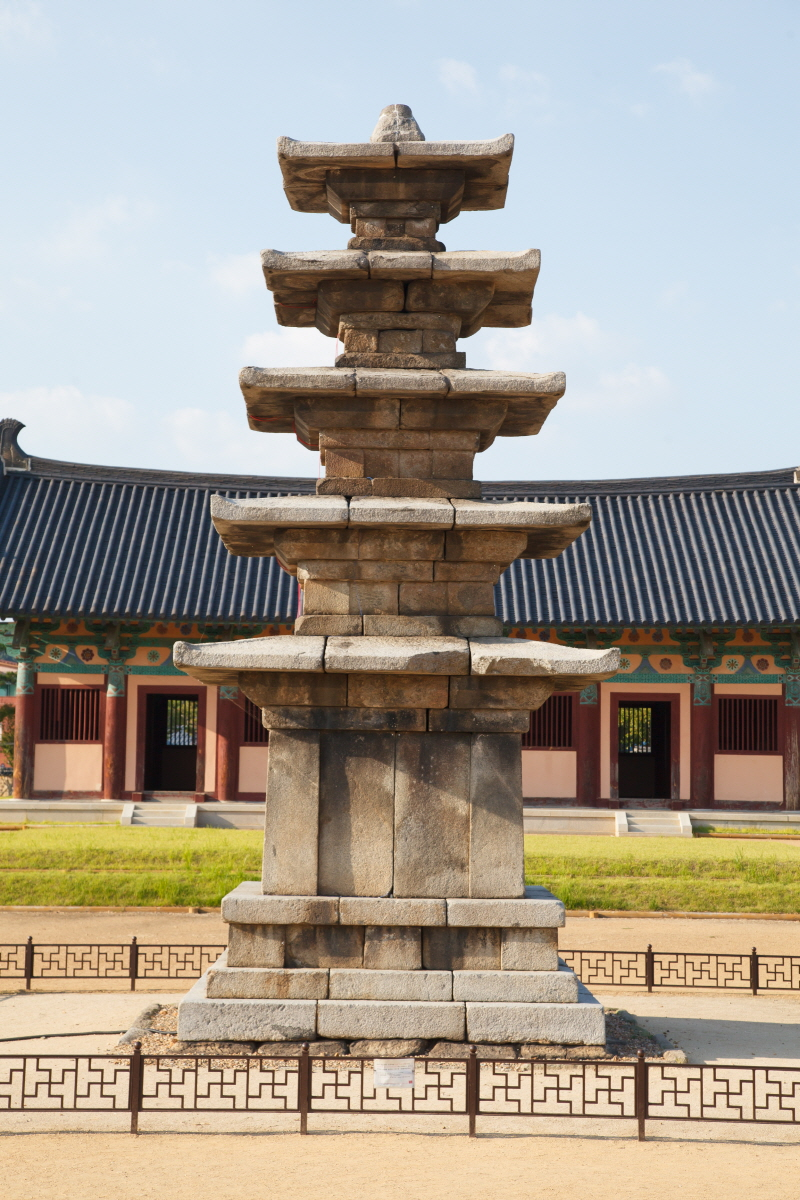
- The pagoda (2015)
- Designation

National Treasure (South Korea)
- Designated: 1962-12-20
- Reference no.: 9
- Location: 36°16′46″N 126°54′48″E

Korean name
- Hangul: 부여 정림사지 오층석탑
- Hanja: 扶餘定林寺址五層石塔
- RR: Buyeo Jeongnimsaji ocheung seoktap
- MR: Puyŏ Chŏngnimsaji och'ŭng sŏkt'ap

The Five-story Stone Pagoda at Jeongnimsa Temple Site, Buyeo (Korean: 부여 정림사지 오층석탑; Hanja: 扶餘定林寺址五層石塔) is a Baekje-era five-story pagoda. It is currently located at the remains of the temple Jeongnimsa in Buyeo County, South Chungcheong Province, South Korea.

== Description ==
On the first floor of this stone pagoda, it is referred to as the Pyeongsung Tower of Baekje. Recently, a tile engraved with the temple name Jungrimsa was found at this temple site and the site was named Jeongnimsa Temple Site.

Each pedestal is fixed by a pillar stone. Each corner of the pagoda body in each story holds a pillar stone using the beheullim technique, where a pillar's upper and lower extremities are narrow while its middle is convex. Thin and wide roof stones covering the edges of the eaves display what is described as "lofty elegance."

It is valued in that it shows refined and creative figures as well as the typical form of a wooden building like a thin pedestal, with pillars exhibiting the beheullim technique and thin and wide roof stones. The pagoda is also highly valued as one of the two last remaining stone pagodas from the Baekje Era.

The surface of the stone pagoda is engraved with Chinese characters celebrating the victory of the Tang dynasty over Baekje in 660, indicating the symbolic importance of its location for Baekje. It was carved into the pagoda itself by the commanding Tang general who defeated Baekje once and for all during the Baekje–Tang War. The Tang dynasty and Silla kingdom joined forces to destroy Baekje.

| Classification | National Treasures 9 (South Korea) |
| Kind of Cultural Properties | Stone Pagoda |
| Address | 379, Dongnam-ri, Buyeo-eup, Buyeo-gun, Chungcheongnam-do |
| Age | Late Baekje Period |

== See also ==
- National Treasures of South Korea
- Baekje
- Korean Buddhist sculpture
- Korean Buddhism
