= Busosanseong =

Fortress in Buyeo County, South Korea

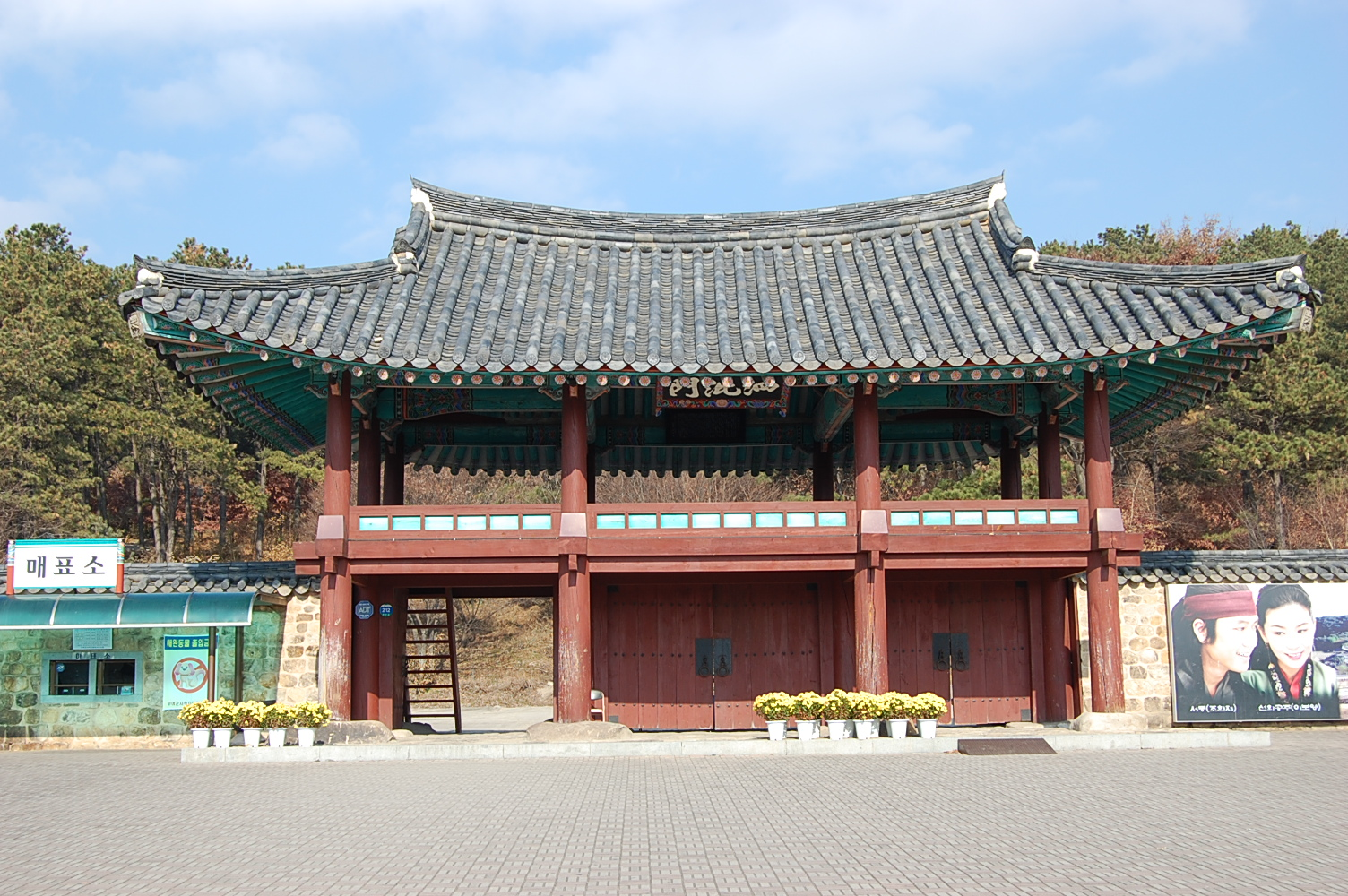
- Front entrance to the fortress (2008)
- Interactive map of Busosanseong
- Location: Buyeo County, South Chungcheong Province, South Korea
- Coordinates: 36.2884°N 126.9125°E
- Built: 538 (Korean calendar)

UNESCO World Heritage Site
- Official name: Archeological Site in Gwanbuk-ri and Busosanseong Fortress
- Criteria: Cultural: (ii), (iii)
- Part of: Baekje Historic Areas
- Reference no.: 1477-003

Historic Sites of South Korea
- Official name: Busosanseong Fortress, Buyeo
- Designated: 1963-01-21

Korean name
- Hangul: 부소산성
- Hanja: 扶蘇山城
- RR: Busosanseong
- MR: Pusosansŏng

Busosanseong (Korean: 부소산성; Hanja: 扶蘇山城) was a Baekje-era Korean fortress on the mountain Busosan in what is now Buyeo County, South Chungcheong Province, South Korea. On January 21, 1963, it was designated Historic Site of South Korea No. 5. The fortress was built in 538 (Korean calendar), possibly in place of another existing fortification on the spot, to protect the final Baekje capital Sabi. The fortification has traces of three main gates and a military depot.

A notable discovery at Busosanseong includes a stone stele that commemorates the foundation of a Buddhist temple by a prominent state official, Sataek Ji-jieok. Sataek served under Baekje ruler King Uija (r. 641-660), the last of the Baekje Dynasty.

On October 13th 2025, the National Research Institute of Cultural Heritage in Buyeo announced the discovery of a Baekje-era ice warehouse. The pit is 7 by 8 meters wide and 2.5 meters deep, forming a square with a U-shaped interior. The walls are made of bedrock, and stones were added later to improve drainage. A small jijingu jar was also found buried inside the structure. The jar would have been buried at the beginning of construction as an offering to the local land deity. Inside the jar were five Chinese wushu coins.

== Gallery ==
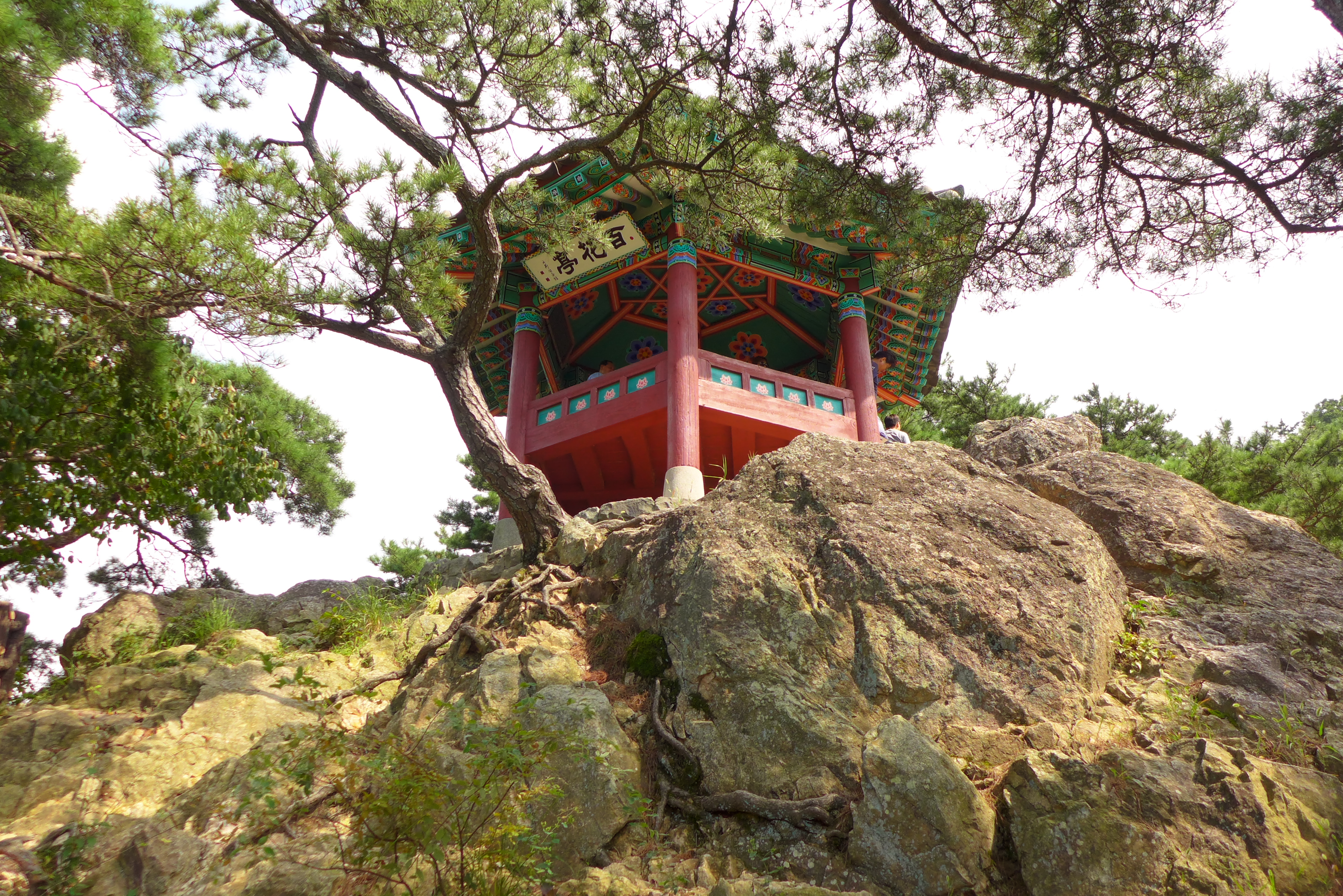
Baekhwajeong Pavilion, built in 1929. It is located North of Busosanseong, near Nakhwaam.

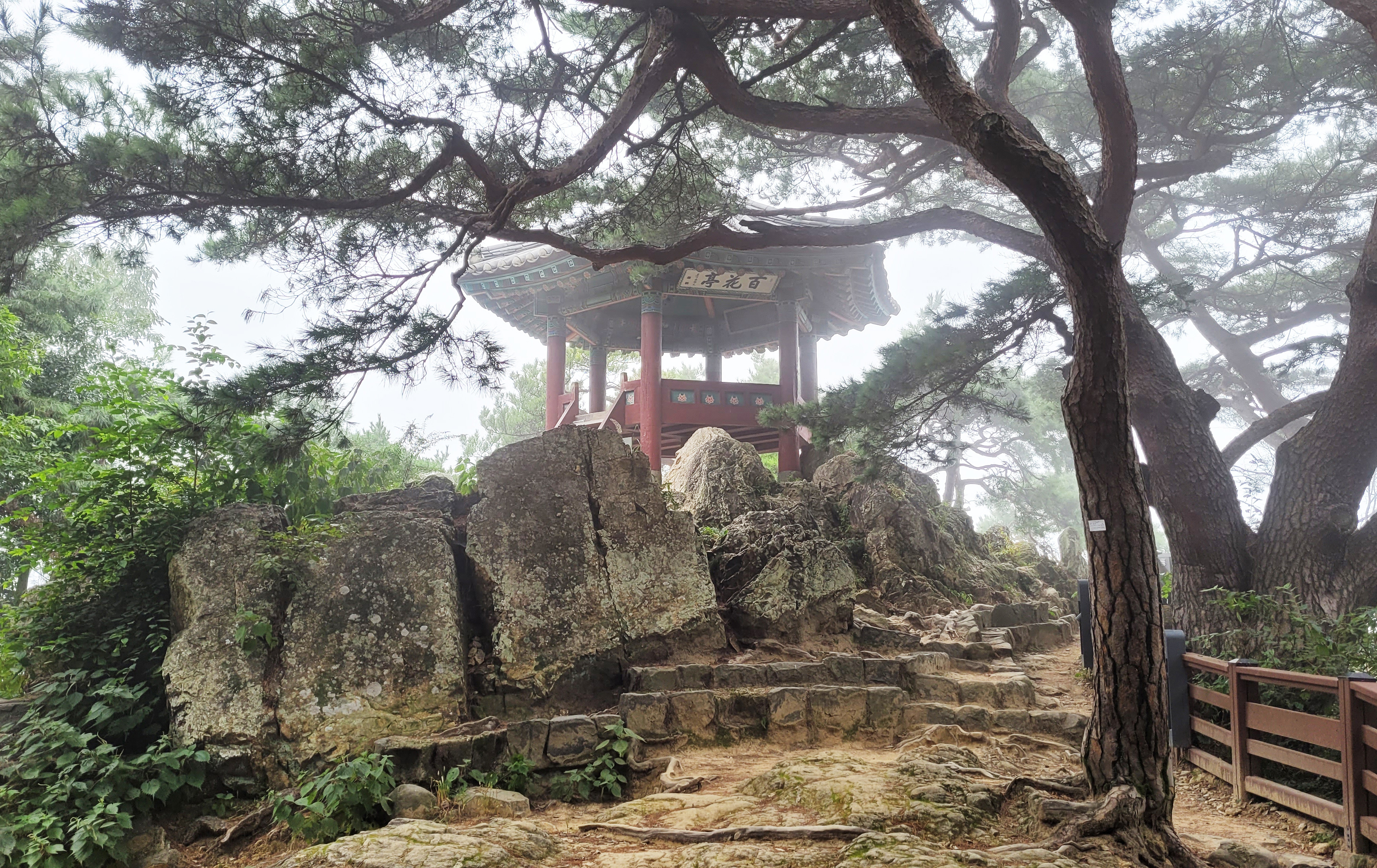
Another angle of Baekhwwajeon.

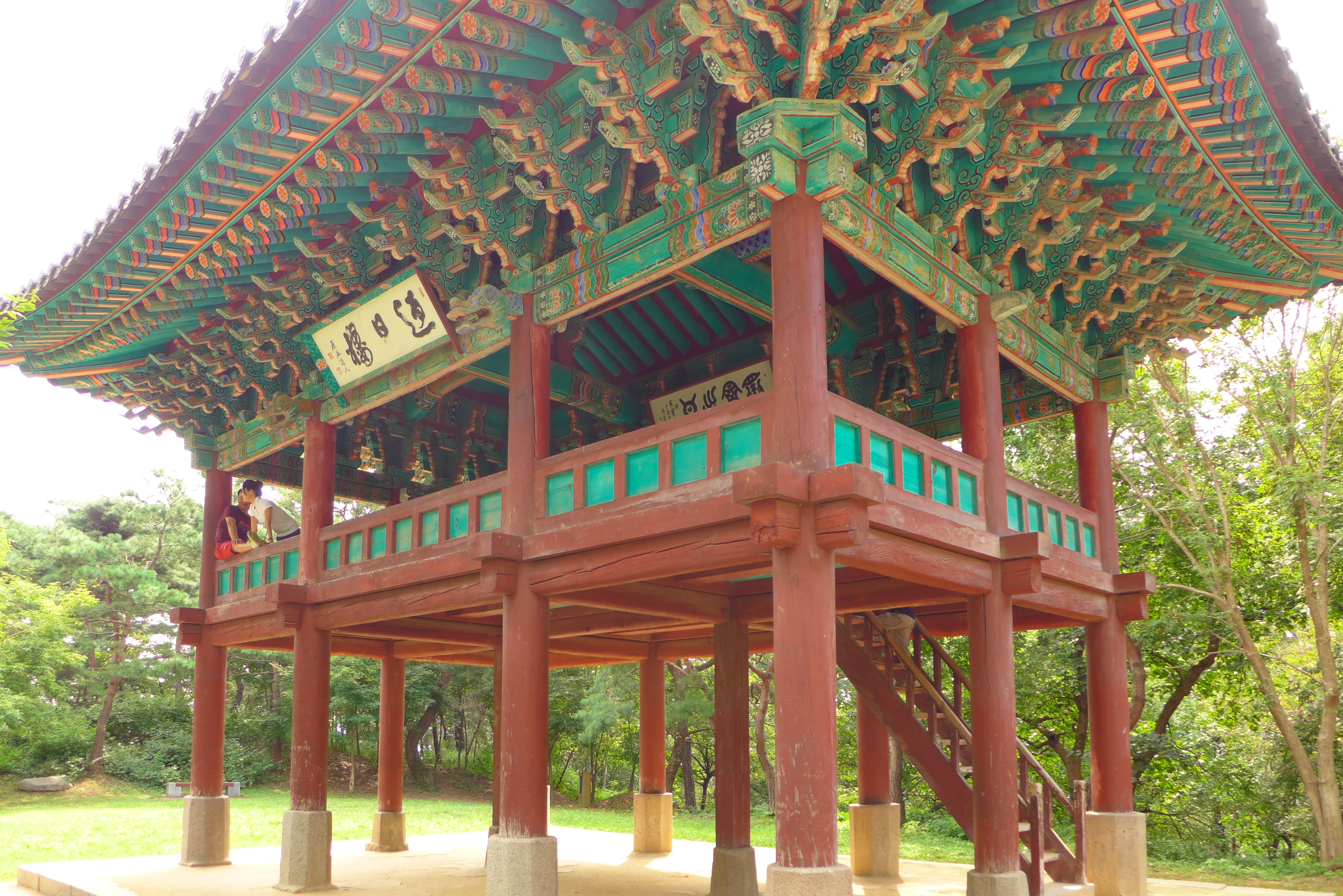
Ban-Wollu, a small pavilion located south of Busosanseong Fortress.

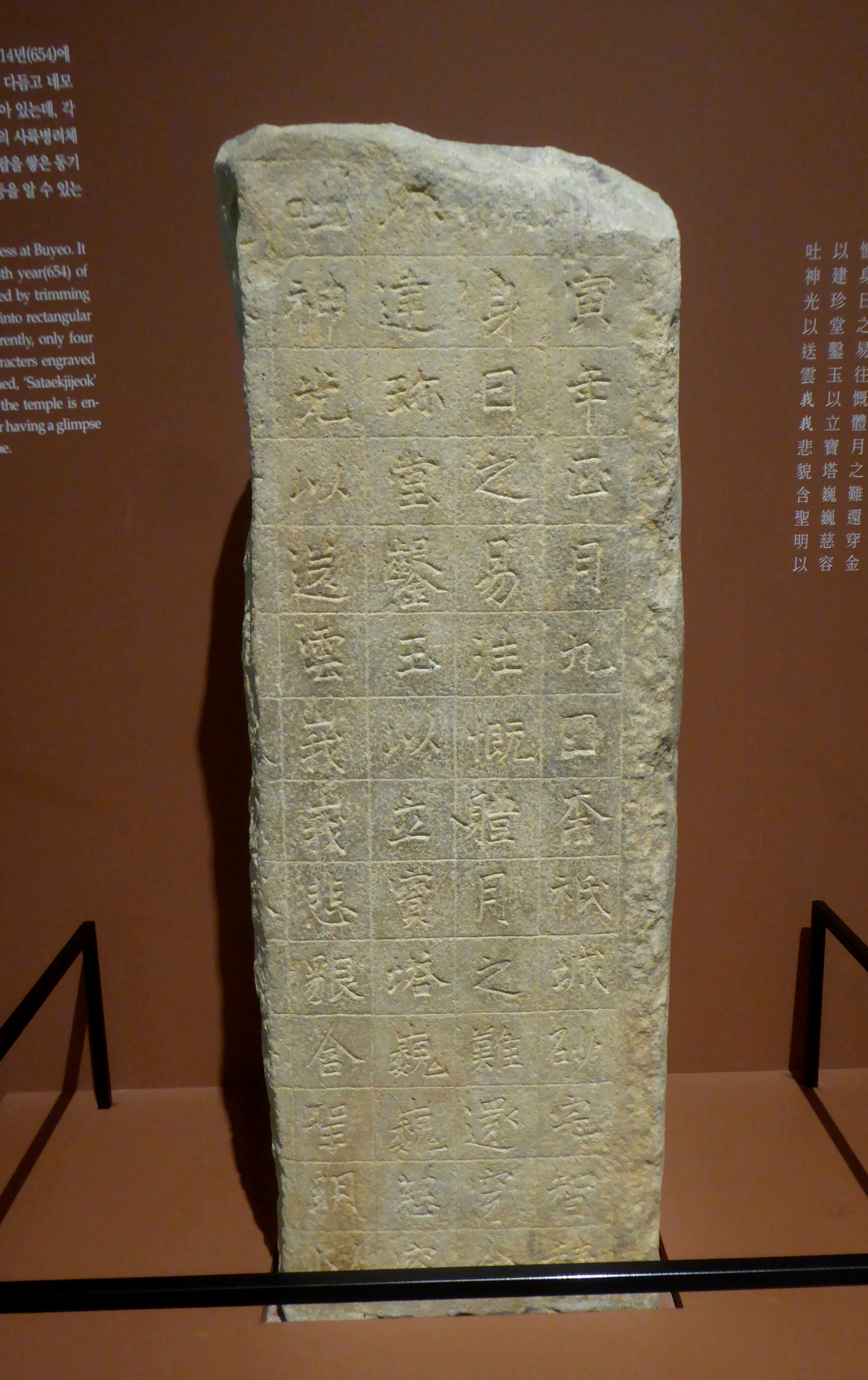
Replica of the Sataekjijeok Stele, originally recovered at Busosanseong. This version is at the National Museum of Korea, Seoul.

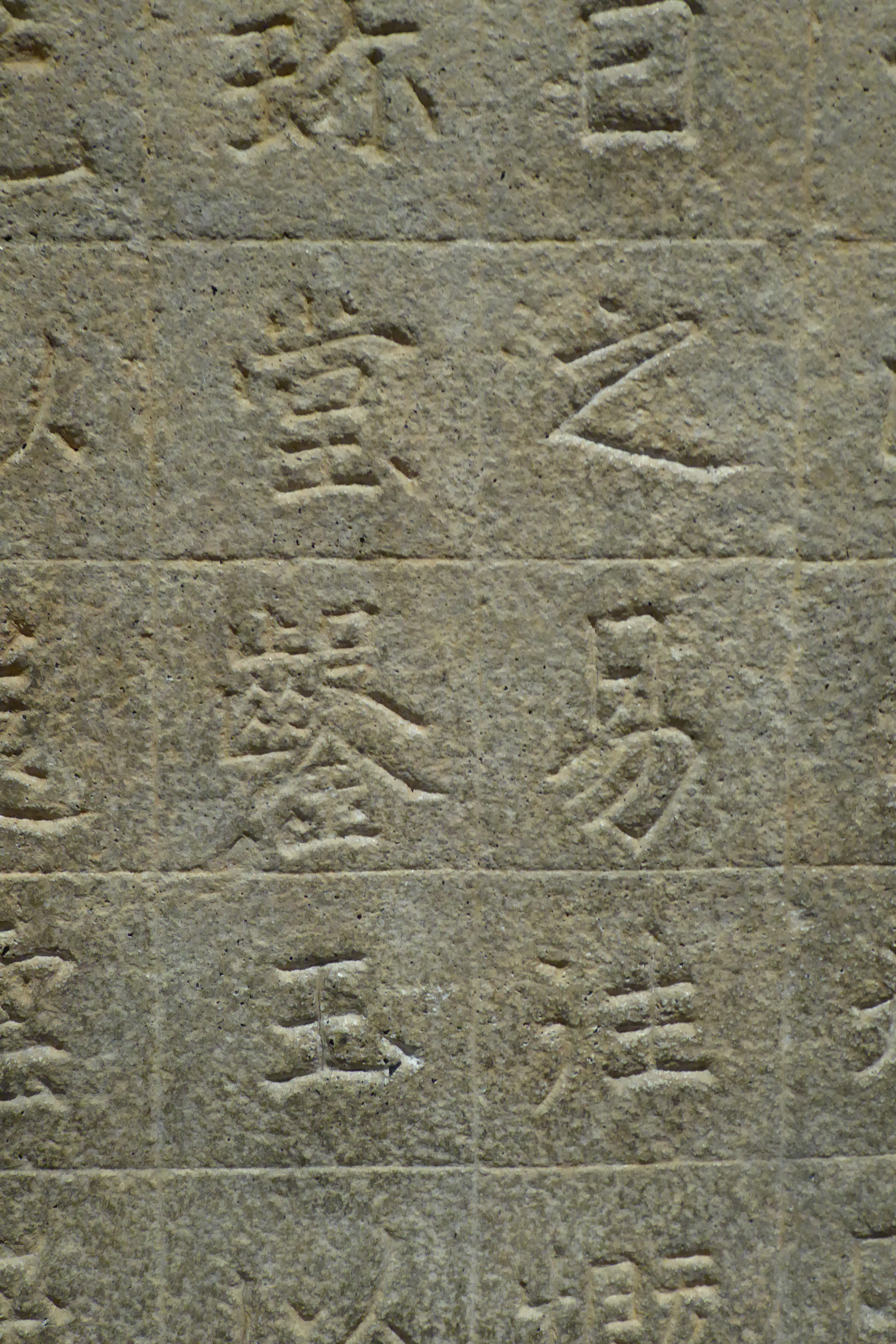
Close up of Sataekjijeok Stele.
