= Archaeological Site in Gwanbuk-ri =

Baekje-era ruins in Buyeo, South Korea

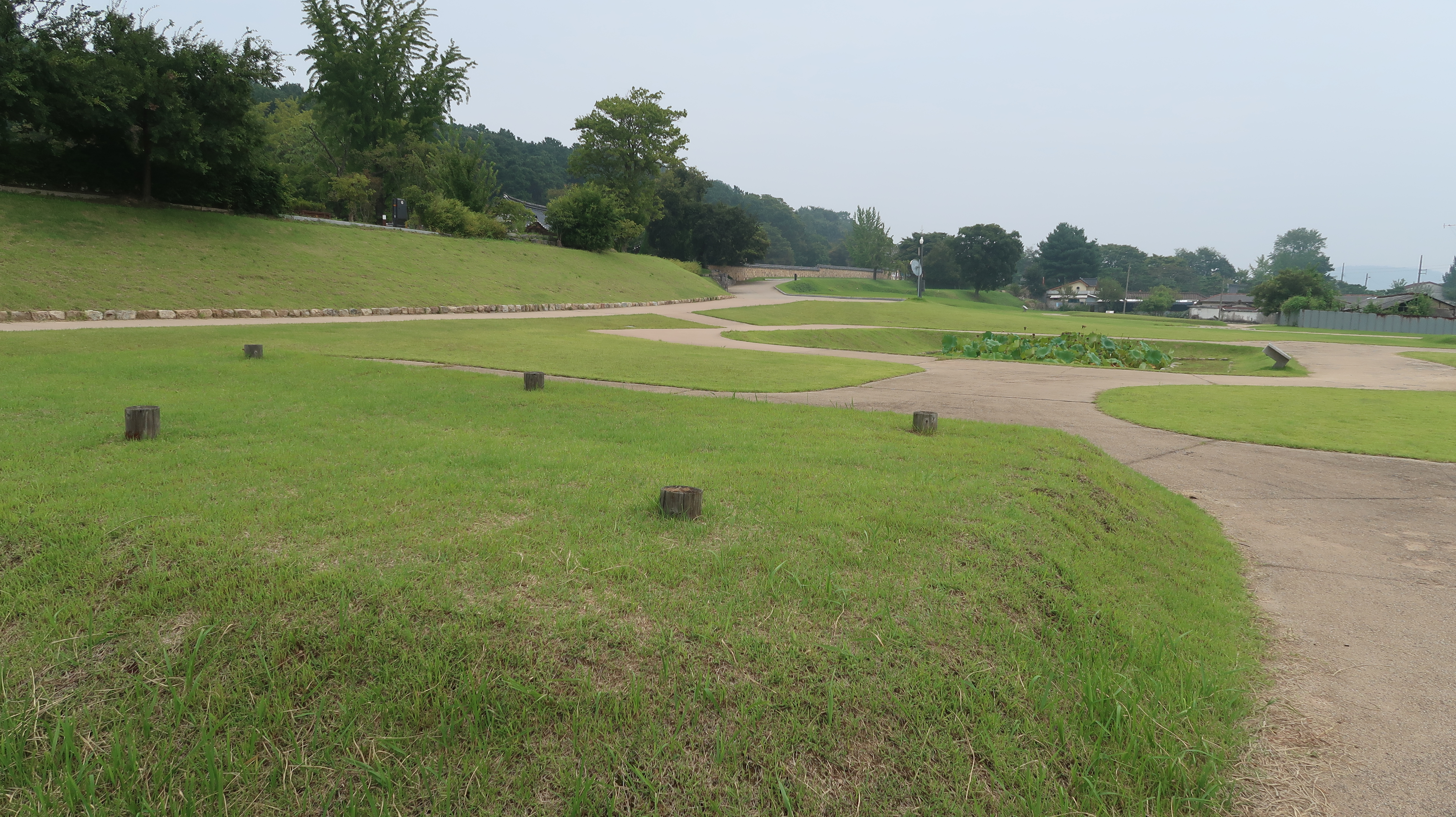
- Remains of the palace (2017)
- Interactive map of Archaeological Site in Gwanbuk-ri
- Location: Buyeo County, South Chungcheong Province, South Korea
- Coordinates: 36°17′4″N 126°54′45″E

UNESCO World Heritage Site
- Criteria: Cultural: (ii), (iii)
- Designated: 2015
- Part of: Baekje Historic Areas
- Reference no.: 1477-003

Historic Sites of South Korea
- Official name: Archaeological Site in Gwanbuk-ri, Buyeo
- Designated: 2001-02-05
- Reference no.: 428

The Archaeological Site in Gwanbuk-ri (Korean: 부여 관북리 유적; Hanja: 扶餘官北里遺蹟) is the site of a former Baekje royal palace in Gwanbuk-ri, Buyeo County, South Chungcheong Province, South Korea. In 2015, it was made a UNESCO World Heritage Site as part of the item Baekje Historic Areas. On February 5, 2001, it was made a Historic Site of South Korea.

The site is presumed to be a royal palace of the final Baekje capital Sabi. It is located at the southwestern foot of the mountain Busosan. The site was excavated from 1982 to 1992 by Chungnam National University. It was excavated by the Buyeo National Research Institute of Cultural Heritage from 2001 to 2008. In September 1983, it was made a Monument of South Chungcheong Province. This designation was upgraded to the national-level Historic Site in 2001. Before the discovery of this site, among the palaces of the Three Kingdoms period, only the location of the Goguryeo palace Anhakkung was known.

The remains of lotus ponds, wells, workshops, palace buildings, and roads have been identified.
