= Gongsanseong =

Fortress in Gongju, South Korea

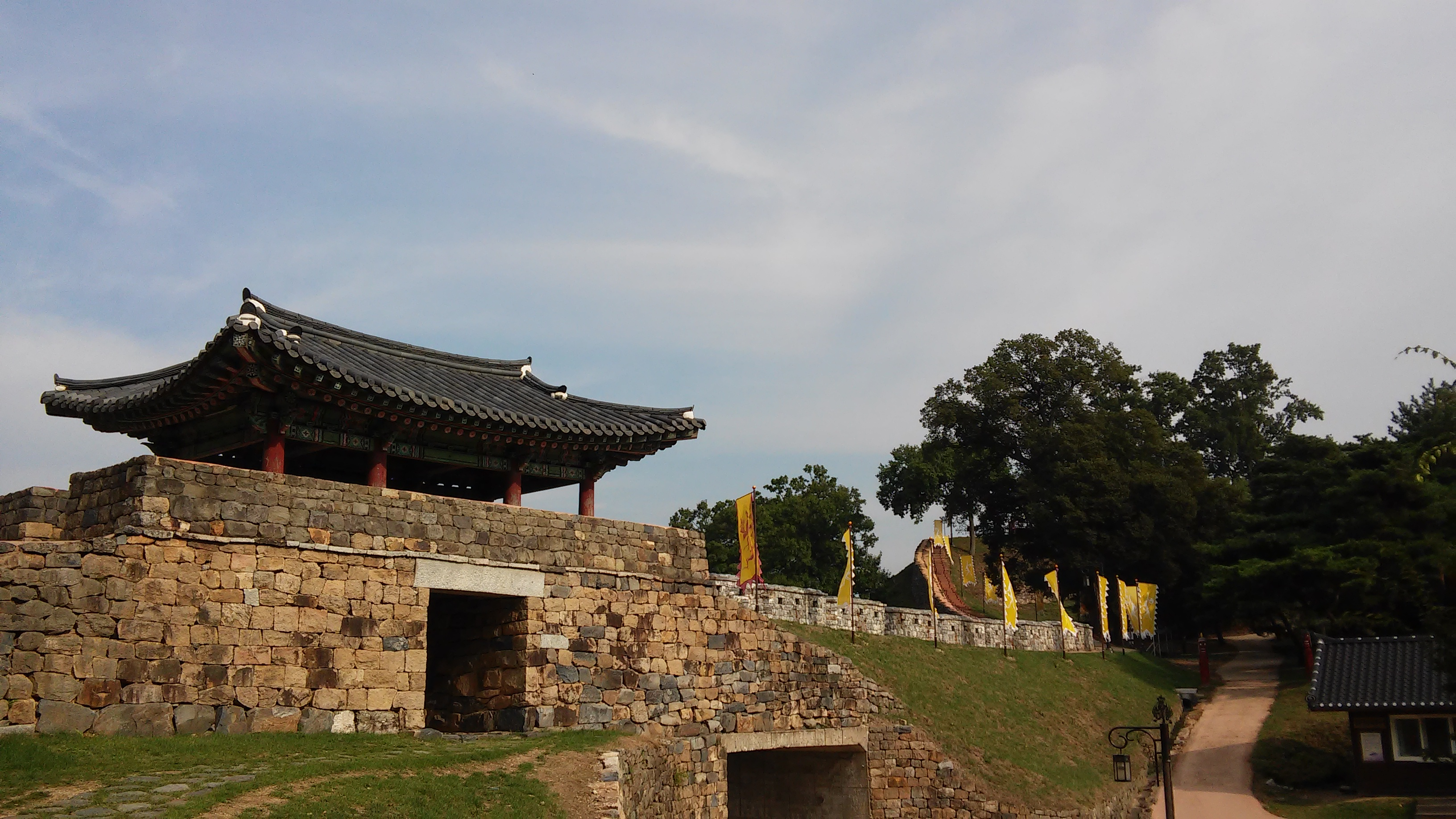
- Part of the fortress (2016)
- Interactive map of Gongsanseong
- Coordinates: 36°27′47″N 127°07′35″E

UNESCO World Heritage Site
- Official name: Gongsanseong Fortress, Gongju
- Criteria: Cultural: (ii), (iii)
- Designated: 2015
- Reference no.: 1477

Historic Sites of South Korea
- Designated: 1963-01-21
- Reference no.: 12

Korean name
- Hangul: 공산성
- Hanja: 公山城
- RR: Gongsanseong
- MR: Kongsansŏng

Gongsanseong (Korean: 공산성; Hanja: 公山城) is a castle in Gongju, South Chungcheong Province, South Korea.

== Description ==
Gongsanseong was initially known as Ungjinseong and subsequently as Gongsanseong during the reign of the Goryeo Dynasty. It occupies an area of 20 hectares (49 acres), presently in the Geumseong-dong and Sanseong-dong districts. It was unearthed during the archaeological excavations done after 1980s, when the constriction methods in building the forts's rampart, the royal palace, and the associated structures of the royal palace were revealed. The fort is located atop the Gongsan mountain (elevation 110 metres (360 ft)) and extends over a length of 2,666 metres (8,747 ft), with its stone wall in 1,925 metres (6,316 ft) length and the balance 735 metres (2,411 ft) made of earth. It was built as a defense fortification adapted to the local topography by linking mountain peaks and bridging the valleys. Following the collapse of the Baekje empire, the ramparts were rebuilt fully as stone walls. The fortress has been illuminated. It functioned both as a defense structure and a royal palace.
