= Buyeo County =

County in South Chungcheong, South Korea

Coordinates: 36°16′55″N 126°54′45″E

Buyeo
- County
- View of Buyeo-eup

- Flag Emblem of Buyeo

- Location in South Korea
- Country: South Korea
- Region: Hoseo
- Administrative divisions: 1 eup, 15 myeon

Government
  - Mayor: Park Jeong-hyeon(박정현)

Area
  - Total: 624.65 km^{2} (241.18 sq mi)

Population (September 2024)
  - Total: 59,823
  - Density: 152.4/km^{2} (395/sq mi)
  - Dialect: Chungcheong

Korean name
- Hangul: 부여군
- Hanja: 扶餘郡
- RR: Buyeo-gun
- MR: Puyŏ-gun

Buyeo County (Korean: 부여군) is a county in South Chungcheong Province, South Korea. Buyeo-eup, the county's capital, was the site of the capital of Baekje from 538-660 AD, during which it was called Sabi.

Famous people associated with Buyeo County in more recent times include noted stem-cell researcher Hwang Woo-suk.

== Geography ==
Administration map of Buyeo

Buyeo is located at the southern area of Chungcheongnam-do, the heart of the Korean peninsula.

During the Three Kingdoms Era, the capital of Baekje was moved to present-day Buyeo-eup (then called Sabi) on account of crowding in the former capital, which was near present-day Seoul. A fortress called Garimseong was constructed for defending the new capital. Buyeo County has numerous historical sites from this era, such as the mountain fortresses (sanseong) at Seongheung, Buso, and Cheong, the tumuli at Neungsan-ri, and the temple site at Gunsu-ri, all designated Historic Sites of South Korea.

== Climate ==
Climate data for Buyeo (1991–2020 normals, extremes 1972–present)
Month	Jan	Feb	Mar	Apr	May	Jun	Jul	Aug	Sep	Oct	Nov	Dec	Year
Record high °C (°F)	17.0 (62.6)	20.6 (69.1)	25.3 (77.5)	30.7 (87.3)	33.3 (91.9)	34.7 (94.5)	37.7 (99.9)	39.3 (102.7)	34.1 (93.4)	30.5 (86.9)	25.9 (78.6)	18.2 (64.8)	39.3 (102.7)
Mean daily maximum °C (°F)	4.4 (39.9)	7.2 (45.0)	12.7 (54.9)	19.3 (66.7)	24.5 (76.1)	28.0 (82.4)	29.8 (85.6)	30.8 (87.4)	26.9 (80.4)	21.4 (70.5)	13.8 (56.8)	6.5 (43.7)	18.8 (65.8)
Daily mean °C (°F)	−1.5 (29.3)	0.7 (33.3)	5.7 (42.3)	11.8 (53.2)	17.6 (63.7)	22.1 (71.8)	25.3 (77.5)	25.7 (78.3)	20.7 (69.3)	13.8 (56.8)	6.9 (44.4)	0.4 (32.7)	12.4 (54.3)
Mean daily minimum °C (°F)	−6.6 (20.1)	−4.9 (23.2)	−0.6 (30.9)	4.9 (40.8)	11.4 (52.5)	17.2 (63.0)	21.8 (71.2)	21.9 (71.4)	15.9 (60.6)	7.7 (45.9)	1.4 (34.5)	−4.5 (23.9)	7.1 (44.8)
Record low °C (°F)	−22.1 (−7.8)	−16.6 (2.1)	−12.5 (9.5)	−5.5 (22.1)	0.4 (32.7)	6.8 (44.2)	13.0 (55.4)	11.2 (52.2)	3.2 (37.8)	−3.6 (25.5)	−11.2 (11.8)	−17.6 (0.3)	−22.1 (−7.8)
Average precipitation mm (inches)	24.9 (0.98)	37.6 (1.48)	50.9 (2.00)	85.3 (3.36)	97.5 (3.84)	157.1 (6.19)	295.7 (11.64)	284.8 (11.21)	146.0 (5.75)	63.6 (2.50)	51.8 (2.04)	31.4 (1.24)	1,326.6 (52.23)
Average precipitation days (≥ 0.1 mm)	6.9	5.8	7.6	7.9	7.9	9.3	14.7	13.5	8.7	5.9	8.4	8.9	105.5
Average snowy days	7.8	4.9	1.8	0.1	0.0	0.0	0.0	0.0	0.0	0.1	2.2	6.2	22.8
Average relative humidity (%)	70.9	65.6	64.1	63.0	66.9	72.1	79.8	78.5	75.8	74.0	73.1	73.2	71.4
Mean monthly sunshine hours	164.4	173.6	209.6	222.5	236.5	199.3	157.7	184.5	187.2	198.8	155.6	153.3	2,243
Percentage possible sunshine	57.8	61.3	60.4	62.3	58.7	52.4	43.9	52.7	57.1	63.1	55.2	55.6	56.6
Source: Korea Meteorological Administration (snow and percent sunshine 1981–2010)

== Commerce ==
It wasn't until the early 2000s that Lotteria moved into the area, but in recent years it has become home to a variety of franchises.

As a traditional city, many coffee shops are built in the style of hanoks or have a Hanok concept.

On 8 September 2013, a new Lotte Outlet Buyeo branch was opened in Gyuram-myeon.

== Baekje Cultural Festival ==
Buyeo County held its first Baekje cultural festival in 1955 celebrating the history of ancient Baekje and the culture that blossomed in the Buyeo area, sponsored by the residents of Buyeo County themselves. The province began

From 1965, the province officially announced to take place Baekje cultural memorial.

The festival showcases traditional costumes and marching from the Baekje era, focusing on the works of the six kings of the Sabi era and the story of the loyalty of three subjects. This festival was ranked among the best in the country in 2007.

== Sister cities ==
- Gangdong, Seoul
- Gangnam, Seoul
- Luoyang, Henan, China
- Asuka, Nara, Japan

== See also ==
- List of Baekje-related topics
- Geography of South Korea
- Chungcheong
- Five storied stone pagoda of Jeongnimsa Temple site:located in Buyeo
- Busosanseong
