= National Route 26 (South Korea) =

Road in South Korea

National Route 26
- 국도 제26호선

Route information
- Length: 235.6 km (146.4 mi)
- Existed: 31 August 1971–present

Major junctions
- West end: Gunsan, North Jeolla Province
- East end: Seo District, Daegu

Location
- Country: South Korea

Highway system
- Highway systems of South Korea; Expressways; National; Local

National Route 26 is a national highway that connects Gunsan to Seo District, Daegu, South Korea. It was established on August 31st, 1971.

== History ==
On August 31, 1971, the National Highway Designation Decree created the Gunsan–Daegu line of National Route 26. Three months later, on November 2nd, the 1.95 km section from Gunha-ri to Gunsang-ri, Jinan-myeon, Jinan County was changed to 1.83 km due to straightening construction on the bypass section. On December 28, 1972, the route was improved; the 13.3 km section from Hwasim-ri, Soyang-myeon, Wanju County to Sinjeong-ri, Bugwi-myeon, Jinan County was shortened to 9.155 km.

- August 22, 1980: The section from Sanjeong-ri, Yongjin-myeon, Wanju County, Jeollabuk-do to Sangnam-ri, Seosang-myeon, Hamyang County, Gyeongsangnam-do (including Moraejae Tunnel) opened.
- October 2, 1980: The 707 m section from Wollim-ri to Gyobuk-ri, Anui-myeon, Hamyang County opened, and the existing 620 m section was closed.
- May 13, 1986: The terminus was changed from "Daegu City, Gyeongsangbuk-do" to "Seogu District, Daegu Direct-Controlled City".
- July 1, 1996: The terminus was changed from "Seogu District, Daegu Direct-Controlled City" to "Seogu District, Daegu Metropolitan City".
- December 19, 1997: The 2.83 km Jinan Bypass section (from Gunha-ri to Guryong-ri, Jinan-eup, Jinan County) opened.
- January 31, 1998: The 11.13 km Jeonju–Soyang section (from Uadong, Deokjin-gu, Jeonju to Hwasim-ri, Soyang-myeon, Wanju County) opened.
- April 3, 1998: The 2.14 km section from Munong-ri to Wolgang-ri, Jangsu-myeon, Jangsu County opened.
- January 22, 1999: The 14.646 km Soyang–Bugwi section (from Hwasim-ri, Soyang-myeon, Wanju County to Sinjeong-ri, Bugwi-myeon, Jinan County) was expanded and opened.
- March 23, 2001: As part of the Jeonju Interchange improvement project, the 2.08 km section from Banwol-dong to Gorang-dong, Deokjin-gu, Jeonju was changed, and the existing 1.88 km section was closed.
- December 30, 2002: The 4.78 km Myosan Bypass section (from Banpo-ri to Hwayang-ri, Myosan-myeon, Hapcheon County) was expanded and opened, and the existing 3.8 km section was closed.
- July 24, 2003: The 5.42 km Jungnam–Songgye section (from Jungnam-ri, Seosang-myeon, Hamyang County to Songgye-ri, Seoha-myeon, Hamyang County) was expanded and opened.
- December 26, 2003: The section from Songjeong-ri to Daepyeong-ri, Geochang-eup, Geochang County was rerouted to bypass Daedong-ri. Accordingly, the length was changed from 4.0 km to 2.6 km.
- December 27, 2004: The 12.8 km Goryeong–Seongsan and Seongsan–Nongong section (from Heonmun-ri, Goryeong-eup, Goryeong County to Wicheon-ri, Nongong-myeon, Dalseong County) was expanded and opened, and the existing 13.4 km section was closed.
- December 22, 2005: The 2.12 km section from Sajung-dong, Gunsan City to Unhoe-ri, Gaejeong-myeon, Gunsan City was expanded and opened.
- November 23, 2010: The 3.8 km Mari–Songjeong section (from Malheul-ri, Mari-myeon, Geochang County to Songjeong-ri, Geochang-eup) was expanded and opened, and the existing 5.2 km section was closed.
- June 2013: The Yuksipryeong Ecological Passage was completed.
- February 13, 2015: The 3.2 km Yongjeong–Yongjin section from Yongjeong Interchange to Banwol Interchange (from Yongjeong-dong to Goryang-dong, Deokjin-gu, Jeonju) was expanded and opened.
- October 28, 2016: The 8.0 km Yongjeong–Yongjin section from Banwol Interchange to Yongjin Interchange (from Goryang-dong, Deokjin-gu, Jeonju to Yongheung-ri, Yongjin-eup, Wanju County) was expanded and opened.
- October 28, 2016: The opening of the 8.0 km Yongjeong–Yongjin section from Banwol Interchange to Yongjin Interchange (from Goryang-dong, Deokjin-gu, Jeonju to Yongheung-ri, Yongjin-eup, Wanju County) was postponed to November.
- November 10, 2016: The 8.0 km Yongjeong–Yongjin section from Banwol Interchange to Yongjin Interchange (from Goryang-dong, Deokjin-gu, Jeonju to Yongheung-ri, Yongjin-eup, Wanju County) was expanded and opened.
- September 1, 2017: A 0.1 km section from Hwangsan-ri, Seoha-myeon to Wollim-ri, Anui-myeon, Hamyang County was improved and opened, and the existing 0.3 km section was closed.
- September 28, 2017: The 2.2 km Ssangnim–Goryeong section (from Anrim-ri, Ssangnim-myeon, Goryeong County to Goari, Daegaya-eup, Goryeong County) was expanded and opened, and the existing 9.0 km section from Gwion-ri, Ssangnim-myeon to Heonmun-ri, Daegaya-eup, Goryeong County was closed.
- November 5, 2019: A 406 m section in Sanjeong-dong, Deokjin-gu, Jeonju was expanded and opened.
- December 27, 2019: The 2.2 km Ssangnim–Goryeong section (from Anrim-ri, Ssangnim-myeon, Goryeong County to Gwion-ri, Ssangnim-myeon, Goryeong County) was expanded and opened.
- October 5, 2020: The Donggunsan Interchange ramp (Sanwol-ri, Daeya-myeon, Gunsan City) was improved and opened.

== Main stopovers ==
North Jeolla Province

- Gunsan - Iksan - Gimje - Jeonju - Wanju County - Jinan County - Jangsu County

South Gyeongsang Province

- Hamyang County - Geochang County - Hapcheon County

North Gyeongsang Province

- Goryeong County

Daegu

- Dalseong County - Dalseo District - Nam District - Dalseo District - Seo District

== Major intersections ==
- (■): Motorway

IS: Intersection, IC: Interchange

=== North Jeolla Province ===
Name	Hangul name	Connection	Location		Note
Gunsan Airport	군산공항	Namsura 1-gil Sandong-gil	Gunsan City	Okseo-myeon	Terminus
Airport IS	비행장사거리	Okgujeosuji-ro; Sinjangwon-gil	Gunsan City	Okseo-myeon	
Airport IS	공항 교차로	National Route 21 (Saemangeumbuk-ro)	Gunsan City	Miseong-dong	
Munchang Elementary School	문창초등학교		Gunsan City	Miseong-dong	
Miseong IS	미성사거리	Miseong-ro	Gunsan City	Miseong-dong	
No name	(이름 없음)	Sanbuk-ro	Gunsan City	Miseong-dong	
Soryong IS	소룡사거리	Gongdandae-ro	Gunsan City	Soryong-dong	
Jeonbuk Foreign Language High School	전북외국어고등학교		Gunsan City	Soryong-dong	
Oego IS	외고삼거리	National Route 4 National Route 21; National Route 77 (Haemang-ro)	Gunsan City	Soryong-dong	National Route 4, National Route 21, National Route 77 overlap
Wolmyeong Tunnel IS	월명터널삼거리	Wolmyeong-ro	Gunsan City	Haesin-dong	National Route 4, National Route 21, National Route 77 overlap
Doseonjang IS	도선장사거리	Gunsanchang-gil	Gunsan City	Wolmyeong-dong	National Route 21 overlap
Naehang IS	내항사거리	National Route 21; National Route 27 (Daehak-ro)	Gunsan City	Wolmyeong-dong	National Route 21, National Route 27 overlap
Jungang IS	중앙사거리	National Route 27 (Daehak-ro); Jungang-ro	Gunsan City	Wolmyeong-dong	National Route 27 overlap
Yeongdong IS	영동 교차로	Jukseong-ro	Gunsan City	Wolmyeong-dong	
Gunsan Central Elementary School	군산중앙초등학교		Gunsan City	Jungang-dong	
Gunsan Freight Station IS	군산화물역사거리	Guam 3.1-ro Miwon-ro	Gunsan City	Heungnam-dong	
Palma Square	팔마광장	Gyeongam-ro; Haemang-ro	Gunsan City	Heungnam-dong	
Palma Square		Gyeongam-ro; Haemang-ro	Gunsan City	Jochon-dong	
Gyeongjang IS	경장사거리	Gyeongpocheon-ro; Baekreung-ro	Gunsan City	Jochon-dong	
Gyeongjang IS	경장삼거리	Jinpo-ro	Gunsan City	Jochon-dong	
Sicheong IS	시청사거리	Susong-ro; Sicheong-ro	Gunsan City	Jochon-dong	
Dongcho Bridge IS	동초교사거리	Jochon-ro	Gunsan City	Jochon-dong	
Sajeongri IS	사정리삼거리	Gongdandae-ro	Gunsan City	Jochon-dong	
Oksan IS	옥산삼거리	Sajeongdong-gil	Gunsan City	Gaejeong-dong	
Gunsan Wallmyeong Baseball Stadium	월명종합운동장		Gunsan City	Gaejeong-dong	
Stadium IS	운동장사거리	Prefectural Route 709 (Oksan-ro); Gyeonggijang-ro	Gunsan City	Gaejeong-dong	Prefectural Route 709 overlap
Gunsan Fire Station Gaejeong-dong Community Center	군산소방서 개정동주민센터		Gunsan City	Gaejeong-dong	Prefectural Route 709 overlap
Dongan Village IS	동안마을 교차로	Dongan-gil	Gunsan City	Gaejeong-dong	Prefectural Route 709 overlap
Gaejeong Police Station	개정파출소	Prefectural Route 709 (Adongnam-ro)	Gunsan City	Gaejeong-dong	Prefectural Route 709 overlap
Gaejeong Elementary School	개정초등학교		Gunsan City	Gaejeong-myeon	
Choehojanggun IS	최호장군 교차로	National Route 29 (Geumgang-ro)	Gunsan City	Gaejeong-myeon	
Daeya Bus Terminal	대야공용버스터미널		Gunsan City	Daeya-myeon	
Terminal IS	터미널사거리	Manja-ro; Seokhwa-ro	Gunsan City	Daeya-myeon	
Daeya Checkpoint IS	대야검문소 교차로	Prefectural Route 711; Prefectural Route 718; Prefectural Route 744 (Daeyagwantong-ro)	Gunsan City	Daeya-myeon	Prefectural Route 711, 718, 744 overlap
Checkpoint IS	검문소삼거리	Prefectural Route 711; Prefectural Route 744 (Namgyeong-ro)	Gunsan City	Daeya-myeon	Prefectural Route 711, 718, 744 overlap
East Gunsan IC	동군산 나들목	Seohaean Expressway	Gunsan City	Daeya-myeon	Prefectural Route 718 overlap Connect with National Route 21, National Route 29
Howondae IS	호원대삼거리	Prefectural Route 718 (Tapcheon-ro)	Gunsan City	Daeya-myeon	Prefectural Route 718 overlap
Daeya Elementary School Gwangsan Branch School	대야초등학교 광산분교		Gunsan City	Daeya-myeon	
Samgil Bridge	삼길교		Iksan City	Osan-myeon	
Sinyong Bridge	신용교		Iksan City	Osan-myeon	
Sinyong Bridge			Iksan City	Pyeonghwa-dong	
Mokcheon IS	목천 교차로	National Route 23 (Muwang-ro)	Iksan City	Pyeonghwa-dong	
Iksan Agricultural and Marine Products Wholesale Market	익산농수산물도매시장		Iksan City	Pyeonghwa-dong	
Mokcheon IS	목천삼거리	Mokcheon-ro	Iksan City	Pyeonghwa-dong	
Mangyeong 2 Bridge	만경2교		Iksan City	Pyeonghwa-dong	
Mangyeong 2 Bridge			Gimje City	Baekgu-myeon	
Yugang Checkpoint	유강검문소	Yugang-ro	Gimje City	Baekgu-myeon	
Banwol IS	반월삼거리	Prefectural Route 735 (Hwangto-ro)	Gimje City	Baekgu-myeon	
Hakdong IS	학동 교차로	National Route 21 (Saemangeumbuk-ro)	Gimje City	Baekgu-myeon	
Nansan IS	난산삼거리	Geumbaek-ro	Gimje City	Baekgu-myeon	
Deukja IS	득자삼거리	Prefectural Route 702 (Yongji-ro)	Gimje City	Baekgu-myeon	
Deukryong Bridge	득룡교		Gimje City	Baekgu-myeon	
Deukryong Bridge			Jeonju City	Deokjin District	
Daeheung IS	대흥 교차로	National Route 21 (Saemangeumbuk-ro); National Route 1 National Route 27 (Honam-ro)	Jeonju City	Deokjin District	National Route 21 overlap
Jochon IS	조촌 교차로	Girin-daero; Ongoeul-ro; Jjokgureum-ro	Jeonju City	Deokjin District	National Route 21 overlap
Jeonju IC (Banwol IS)	전주 나들목 (반월 교차로)	Honam Expressway	Jeonju City	Deokjin District	National Route 21 overlap
Dongsan Square IS	동산광장 교차로	Banwol-ro; Samnye-ro; Hyeoksin-ro	Jeonju City	Deokjin District	National Route 21 overlap
Dongsan Station IS	동산역네거리	Pyeonun-ro	Jeonju City	Deokjin District	National Route 21 overlap
Jeonjucheon Bridge	전주천교		Jeonju City	Deokjin District	National Route 21 overlap
Baldanri IS	발단리네거리	Sicheon-ro; Jeonmi-ro	Jeonju City	Deokjin District	National Route 21 overlap
Jeonju City Agricultural and Marine Products Market	전주시농수산물시장		Jeonju City	Deokjin District	National Route 21 overlap
Songcheon Station IS	송천역네거리	Songcheonjungang-ro	Jeonju City	Deokjin District	National Route 21 overlap
Vehicle Registration Office	차량등록사업소앞	National Route 17 (Wanju-ro)	Jeonju City	Deokjin District	National Route 17, National Route 21 overlap
Hoseong-dong Community Center	호성동주민센터		Jeonju City	Deokjin District	National Route 17, National Route 21 overlap
Station Square (Jeonju Station)	역전광장 (전주역)	Baekje-daero	Jeonju City	Deokjin District	National Route 17, National Route 21 overlap
Andeokwon IS (Andeokwon Underpass)	안덕원사거리 (안덕원지하차도)	National Route 17; National Route 21 (Dongbu-daero); Andeokwon-ro	Jeonju City	Deokjin District	National Route 17, National Route 21 overlap
Baekja IS	백자삼거리	Wonsanjeong-gil	Jeonju City	Deokjin District	
Geumsang IS	금상 교차로	Geumsang-gil	Jeonju City	Deokjin District	
East Jeonju IC (East Jeonju IC IS)	동전주 나들목 (동전주ic 교차로)	Suncheon–Wanju Expressway	Jeonju City	Deokjin District	
Samgeo IS	삼거 교차로	Jangpyeong 1-gil	Jeonju City	Deokjin District	
Myeongdeok IS	명덕 교차로	Soyang-ro; Jangpyeong 1-gil	Wanju County	Soyang-myeon	
Hwangun IS	황운 교차로	Soyang-ro	Wanju County	Soyang-myeon	
Soyang IC (Soyang IS)	소양 나들목 (소양 교차로)	Iksan–Pohang Expressway	Wanju County	Soyang-myeon	
Haewol 1 IS	해월1 교차로	Soyang-ro	Wanju County	Soyang-myeon	
Haewol 2 IS	해월2 교차로	Wonhaewol-gil	Wanju County	Soyang-myeon	
Dongyang Elementary School	동양초등학교		Wanju County	Soyang-myeon	
Hwasim IS	화심 교차로	Prefectural Route 55 (Dongsang-ro); Prefectural Route 749 (Sanggwansoyang-ro)	Wanju County	Soyang-myeon	Prefectural Route 55 overlap
No name	(이름 없음)	Moraejae-ro	Wanju County	Soyang-myeon	Prefectural Route 55 overlap
Boryong Pass	보룡고개		Wanju County	Soyang-myeon	Prefectural Route 55 overlap
Boryong Pass			Jinan County	Bugwi-myeon	Prefectural Route 55 overlap
Bongam IS	봉암 교차로	Bugwi-ro; Unjang-ro; Sotaejeong-gil	Jinan County	Bugwi-myeon	Prefectural Route 55 overlap
Geoseok IS	거석사거리	Bugwi-ro	Jinan County	Bugwi-myeon	Prefectural Route 55 overlap
Bugwi IS	부귀 교차로	Prefectural Route 49 (Gwisang-ro)	Jinan County	Bugwi-myeon	Prefectural Route 49, 55 overlap
Seopan IS	서판사거리	Moraejae-ro	Jinan County	Bugwi-myeon	Prefectural Route 49, 55 overlap
Yeonjang IS	연장 교차로	Prefectural Route 49; Prefectural Route 55 (Gwanjil-ro)	Jinan County	Jinan-eup	Prefectural Route 49, 55 overlap
Bugok IS	부곡삼거리	Geobukbawi-ro	Jinan County	Jinan-eup	
Jinan IS	진안 교차로	National Route 30 (Jinmu-ro); Prefectural Route 795 (Jungang-ro); Maisan-ro	Jinan County	Jinan-eup	National Route 30 overlap
Jinyang Overpass	진양육교		Jinan County	Jinan-eup	National Route 30 overlap
Wolrang IS	월랑 교차로	Jinmu-ro	Jinan County	Jinan-eup	National Route 30 overlap
Guryong IS	구룡 교차로	National Route 30 (Jinjang-ro)	Jinan County	Jinan-eup	National Route 30 overlap
Dotong IS	도통삼거리	Guryong-gil	Jinan County	Jinan-eup	
Ocheon IS	오천삼거리	Juksan-ro	Jinan County	Jinan-eup	
Oeocheon IS	외오천삼거리	Prefectural Route 726 (Oga-ro)	Jinan County	Jinan-eup	Prefectural Route 726 overlap
Banggokjae	방곡재		Jinan County	Jinan-eup	Prefectural Route 726 overlap
Banggokjae			Jangsu County	Cheoncheon-myeon	Prefectural Route 726 overlap
Cheoncheon IS	천천삼거리	National Route 13; Prefectural Route 726 (Jangcheol-ro); Cheoncheon-ro	Jangsu County	Cheoncheon-myeon	Prefectural Route 726 overlap National Route 13 overlap
Chunsong IS	춘송삼거리	Cheoncheon-ro	Jangsu County	Cheoncheon-myeon	National Route 13 overlap
Yonggwang IS	용광삼거리	National Route 13 (Cheoncheonbung-ro)	Jangsu County	Cheoncheon-myeon	National Route 13 overlap
Wonmunong IS	원무농삼거리	Handeul-ro	Jangsu County	Janggye-myeon	
Janggye IS	장계사거리	National Route 19 (Jangmu-ro)	Jangsu County	Janggye-myeon	National Route 19 overlap
Sindong IS (Mujin Fire Station)	신동삼거리 (무진장소방서)	National Route 19 (Baekhwa-ro)	Jangsu County	Janggye-myeon	National Route 19 overlap
Wolgang IS	월강삼거리	Handeul-ro; Dojanggol-gil	Jangsu County	Janggye-myeon	
Sambong IS	삼봉삼거리		Jangsu County	Janggye-myeon	
Odong IS	오동삼거리	Prefectural Route 743 (Uiam-ro)	Jangsu County	Janggye-myeon	Prefectural Route 743 overlap
Myeongdeok IS	명덕삼거리	Prefectural Route 743 (Sobijae-ro)	Jangsu County	Janggye-myeon	Prefectural Route 743 overlap
Jangsu Racehorse Farm	장수목장		Jangsu County	Janggye-myeon	
Yuksipryeong	육십령		Jangsu County	Janggye-myeon	Elevation 734m Continuation into South Gyeongsang Province

=== South Gyeongsang Province ===
Name	Hangul name	Connection	Location		Note
Yuksipryeong	육십령		Hamyang County	Seosang-myeon	Elevation 734m North Jeolla Province - South Gyeongsang Province border line
Jungnam IS	중남사거리	Prefectural Route 37; Prefectural Route 1001 (Deogyuwolseong-ro); Seosang-ro	Hamyang County	Seosang-myeon	Prefectural Route 37, 1001 overlap
Osan 2 Bridge	오산2교	Daenam-ro	Hamyang County	Seosang-myeon	Prefectural Route 37, 1001 overlap Connect with Seosang IC
No name	(이름 없음)	Seosang-ro	Hamyang County	Seosang-myeon	Prefectural Route 37, 1001 overlap Connect with Seosang IC
Songgye IS	송계삼거리	Prefectural Route 37; Prefectural Route 1001 (Songgye-gil)	Hamyang County	Seoha-myeon	Prefectural Route 37, 1001 overlap
Seoha Elementary School	서하초등학교		Hamyang County	Seoha-myeon	
Seoha Bridge	서하교		Hamyang County	Seoha-myeon	
Seoha Bridge			Hamyang County	Anui-myeon	
Anui Bridge	안의대교		Hamyang County	Anui-myeon	
Gyobuk IS	교북 교차로	National Route 3 National Route 24 (Geoham-daero)	Hamyang County	Anui-myeon	National Route 3, National Route 24 overlap
Yongchu IS	용추 교차로	Yongchugyegok-ro	Hamyang County	Anui-myeon	National Route 3, National Route 24 overlap
Samsan IS	삼산 교차로	Geoan-ro	Hamyang County	Anui-myeon	National Route 3, National Route 24 overlap
Baraegijae	바래기재		Hamyang County	Anui-myeon	National Route 3, National Route 24 overlap
Baraegijae			Geochang County	Mari-myeon	National Route 3, National Route 24 overlap
Samgeori IS	삼거리 교차로	Geoan-ro	Geochang County	Mari-myeon	National Route 3, National Route 24 overlap
Jidong IS	지동 교차로	National Route 37 (Geoan-ro)	Geochang County	Mari-myeon	National Route 3, National Route 24, National Route 37 overlap
Malheul IS	말흘 교차로	Geoan-ro	Geochang County	Mari-myeon	National Route 3, National Route 24, National Route 37 overlap
Jangbaek Tunnel	장백터널		Geochang County	Mari-myeon	National Route 3, National Route 24, National Route 37 overlap Approximately 639m
Jangbaek Tunnel			Geochang County	Geochang-eup	National Route 3, National Route 24, National Route 37 overlap Approximately 639m
Geoyeol Tunnel	거열터널		Geochang County	Geochang-eup	National Route 3, National Route 24, National Route 37 overlap Approximately 544m
Songjeong IS	송정 교차로	National Route 3 (Ongyang-ro)	Geochang County	Geochang-eup	National Route 3, National Route 24, National Route 37 overlap
Jeolbu IS	절부사거리	Gangnam-ro; Gangbyeon-ro	Geochang County	Geochang-eup	National Route 24 overlap
No name	(이름 없음)	Gangnam-ro 1-gil	Geochang County	Geochang-eup	National Route 24 overlap
Gimcheon IS	김천사거리	Prefectural Route 1084 (Sunam-ro)	Geochang County	Geochang-eup	National Route 24 overlap
No name	(이름 없음)	Geoham-daero 4-gil Changnam 2-gil	Geochang County	Geochang-eup	National Route 24 overlap
No name	(이름 없음)	Geochang-daero	Geochang County	Geochang-eup	National Route 24 overlap
No name	(이름 없음)	Prefectural Route 1089 (Changdong-ro)	Geochang County	Geochang-eup	National Route 24 overlap Prefectural Route 1089 overlap
Geochang Fire Station	거창소방서	Geoham-daero	Geochang County	Geochang-eup	National Route 24 overlap Prefectural Route 1089 overlap
Geochang IC	거창 나들목	Gwangju–Daegu Expressway	Geochang County	Geochang-eup	National Route 24 overlap Prefectural Route 1089 overlap
Guknongso IS	국농소삼거리	Prefectural Route 1089 (Bamtijae-ro)	Geochang County	Geochang-eup	National Route 24 overlap Prefectural Route 1089 overlap
Namha Bridge	남하교		Geochang County	Geochang-eup	National Route 24 overlap
Namha Bridge			Geochang County	Namha-myeon	National Route 24 overlap
Namha-myeon Office Namha Elementary School	남하면사무소 남하초등학교		Geochang County	Namha-myeon	National Route 24 overlap
Sanpo IS	산포삼거리	Prefectural Route 1099 (Jisan-ro)	Geochang County	Namha-myeon	National Route 24 overlap
Seoku Bridge	석우교		Geochang County	Namha-myeon	National Route 24 overlap
Gacheon Bridge	가천교		Geochang County	Namha-myeon	National Route 24 overlap
Gacheon Bridge			Hapcheon County	Bongsan-myeon	National Route 24 overlap
Bongsan IS	봉산삼거리	National Route 59; Prefectural Route 1034 (Seobu-ro)	Hapcheon County	Bongsan-myeon	National Route 24 overlap Prefectural Route 1034 overlap
Gwonbin IS	권빈삼거리	Prefectural Route 1034 (Indeok-ro)	Hapcheon County	Bongsan-myeon	National Route 24 overlap Prefectural Route 1034 overlap
Banpo Bridge	반포교	Myosan-ro	Hapcheon County	Myosan-myeon	National Route 24 overlap
Myosan IS	묘산 교차로	National Route 24 (Maryeong-ro)	Hapcheon County	Myosan-myeon	National Route 24 overlap
Anseong Bridge	안성교	Myosan-ro	Hapcheon County	Myosan-myeon	
Bungi IS	분기삼거리	Prefectural Route 1084 (Gayasan-ro)	Hapcheon County	Yaro-myeon	
Seoksa Bridge	석사교		Hapcheon County	Yaro-myeon	Continuation into North Gyeongsang Province

=== North Gyeongsang Province ===
Name	Hangul name	Connection	Location		Note
Seoksa Bridge	석사교		Goryeong County	Ssangnim-myeon	South Gyeongsang Province - North Gyeongsang Province border line
Baeksan Elementary School (Closed)	백산초등학교 (폐교)		Goryeong County	Ssangnim-myeon	
Gwiwonpiamje 1 Tunnel	귀원피암제1터널		Goryeong County	Ssangnim-myeon	Approximately 135m
Gwiwon IS	귀원삼거리	National Route 33 (Daegaya-ro)	Goryeong County	Ssangnim-myeon	National Route 33 overlap
Ssangnim-myeon Office Ssangnim Middle School	쌍림면사무소 쌍림중학교		Goryeong County	Ssangnim-myeon	National Route 33 overlap
Anrim IS	안림삼거리	Prefectural Route 907 (Ssangssang-ro)	Goryeong County	Ssangnim-myeon	National Route 33 overlap
No name	(이름 없음)	Prefectural Route 1036 (Misung-ro)	Goryeong County	Ssangnim-myeon	National Route 33 overlap
No name	(이름 없음)	Sinnam-ro	Goryeong County	Daegaya-eup	National Route 33 overlap
Kaya University Goryeong Campus (Closed) Daegaya Museum	가야대학교 고령캠퍼스 (폐교) 대가야박물관		Goryeong County	Daegaya-eup	National Route 33 overlap
Jisan IS	지산삼거리	Wangneung-ro	Goryeong County	Daegaya-eup	National Route 33 overlap
Goryeong Square (Goryeong Intercity Bus Terminal)	고령광장 (고령시외버스터미널)	Daegaya-ro; Jungang-ro	Goryeong County	Daegaya-eup	National Route 33 overlap
Janggi IS	장기삼거리	Illyang-ro	Goryeong County	Daegaya-eup	National Route 33 overlap
Heonmun IS	헌문 교차로	Prefectural Route 67; Prefectural Route 79 (Seongsan-ro); Jungang-ro	Goryeong County	Daegaya-eup	National Route 33 overlap Prefectural Route 67, 79 overlap
Goryeong IS	고령 교차로	National Route 33; Prefectural Route 67; Prefectural Route 79 (Gaya-ro)	Goryeong County	Daegaya-eup	National Route 33 overlap Prefectural Route 67, 79 overlap
Goryeong Tunnel	고령터널		Goryeong County	Daegaya-eup	Approximately 760m
Goryeong Tunnel			Goryeong County	Seongsan-myeon	Approximately 760m
Daebat Bridge	대밭교		Goryeong County	Seongsan-myeon	
Gisan IS	기산 교차로	Seongsan-ro	Goryeong County	Seongsan-myeon	
Gijok IS	기족 교차로	Seongsan-ro	Goryeong County	Seongsan-myeon	
Eosil Bridge	어실교		Goryeong County	Seongsan-myeon	
Deukseong Tunnel	득성터널		Goryeong County	Seongsan-myeon	Approximately 390m
Seongsan Bridge	성산대교		Goryeong County	Seongsan-myeon	Continuation into Daegu

=== Daegu ===
Name	Hangul name	Connection	Location		Note
Seongsan Bridge	성산대교		Dalseong County	Nongong-eup	North Gyeongsang Province -Daegu border line
Uicheon IS	위천 교차로	National Route 5 (Biseul-ro)	Dalseong County	Nongong-eup	National Route 5 overlap
Uicheon IS	위천삼거리	Seongsan-ro	Dalseong County	Nongong-eup	National Route 5 overlap
Nongong-eup Office	논공읍사무소		Dalseong County	Nongong-eup	National Route 5 overlap
Dalseongguncheong IS	달성군청 교차로	Dalseongguncheong-ro	Dalseong County	Nongong-eup	National Route 5 overlap
Gyeongseo Middle School Daegu Okpo Elementary School Okpo-myeon Office	경서중학교 대구옥포초등학교 옥포면사무소		Dalseong County	Okpo-myeon	National Route 5 overlap
Hwawon Okpo IC (Hwawon Okpo IC IS) (Overpass)	화원옥포 나들목 (화원옥포IC네거리) (고가차도)	Jungbu Naeryuk Expressway Branch; Biseul-ro 468-gil	Dalseong County	Okpo-myeon	National Route 5 overlap
Hwawon High School	화원고등학교		Dalseong County	Hwawon-eup	National Route 5 overlap
No name	(이름 없음)	Seongcheon-ro; Hwaam-ro	Dalseong County	Hwawon-eup	National Route 5 overlap
Hwawon Bridge	화원교		Dalseong County	Hwawon-eup	National Route 5 overlap
Hwawon IS	화원삼거리	Samunjin-ro	Dalseong County	Hwawon-eup	National Route 5 overlap
Daegu Hwawon Elementary School Hwawon-eup Office Daewon High School	대구화원초등학교 화원읍사무소 대원고등학교		Dalseong County	Hwawon-eup	National Route 5 overlap
Daegok Station	Myeongcheon-ro; Biseul-ro 543-gil		Dalseong County	Hwawon-eup	National Route 5 overlap
Yucheon IS	유천네거리	Dalseo-daero; Sanghang-ro	Daegu	Dalseo District	National Route 5 overlap
Jincheon IS (Jincheon Station)	진천네거리 (진천역)	Jincheon-ro	Daegu	Dalseo District	National Route 5 overlap
Wolbae Market IS	월배시장 교차로	Wolbae-ro 22-gil Wolbae-ro 23-gil Wolbae-ro 24-gil	Daegu	Dalseo District	National Route 5 overlap
Ưolbae Elementary School (Wolbae Station)	월배초등학교 (월배역)		Daegu	Dalseo District	National Route 5 overlap
Sangin IS (Sangin Station)	상인네거리 (상인역)	Wolgok-ro	Daegu	Dalseo District	National Route 5 overlap
Lotte Department Store Sangin Store Daegu Sangwon High School Daegu Transportation Corporation Gyeongbuk Machinery Technical High School Daeseo Middle School	롯데백화점 상인점 대구상원고등학교 대구도시철도공사 경북기계공업고등학교 대서중학교		Daegu	Dalseo District	National Route 5 overlap
Wolchon Station IS (Wolchon Station)	월촌역 교차로 (월촌역)	Songhyeon-ro	Daegu	Dalseo District	National Route 5 overlap
Songhyeon Station	송현역		Daegu	Dalseo District	National Route 5 overlap
Kaya Christian Hospital	가야기독병원삼거리	Wolbae-ro 85-gil	Daegu	Dalseo District	National Route 5 overlap
Seongdang IS (Seongdangmot Station) (Daegu Seobu Bus Terminal)	성당네거리 (성당못역) (대구서부정류장)	Prefectural Route 30 (Daemyeong-ro); Guma-ro	Daegu	Dalseo District	National Route 5 overlap Prefectural Route 30 overlap
Duribong IS	두리봉네거리	Daemyeongcheon-ro	Daegu	Dalseo District	National Route 5 overlap Prefectural Route 30 overlap
Duryu Park IS	두류공원네거리	Duryugongwon-ro; Seongdang-ro	Daegu	Dalseo District	National Route 5 overlap Prefectural Route 30 overlap
Duryu Stadium E World Duryu Library	두류운동장 이월드 두류도서관		Daegu	Dalseo District	National Route 5 overlap Prefectural Route 30 overlap
No name	(이름 없음)	Yaoeeumakdang-ro	Daegu	Dalseo District	National Route 5 overlap Prefectural Route 30 overlap
Daegu Shinhung Elementary School	대구신흥초등학교		Daegu	Dalseo District	National Route 5 overlap Prefectural Route 30 overlap
Duryu IS (Duryu Station)	두류네거리 (두류역)	National Route 5 (Seodaegu-ro); National Route 30 (Dalgubeol-daero)	Daegu	Seo District	National Route 5 overlap Prefectural Route 30 overlap Terminus
