= List of Treasures of South Korea (2000–2004) =

The Treasures of South Korea designation was established in 1962 and is managed by the Korea Heritage Service (KHS; formerly "Cultural Heritage Administration"). This designation is distinct from the National Treasure designation. Covered here are items designated in the years 2000 through 2004.

== List ==
No. (Note: On November 19, 2021, the Cultural Heritage Administration removed the numbering system for all of its designations, including Treasure. Previously assigned numbers are preserved here for the sake of reference.)	Image	Official names (Note: (English, Hangul, Hanja/mixed script))	Location	Dates	Refs
11-1		Bronze Bell Cast by Buddhist Monk Sain 사인비구 제작 동종 - 포항보경사서운암동종 思印比丘 製作 銅鍾 - 浦項寶鏡寺瑞雲庵銅鍾	Pohang, North Gyeongsang	2000-02-15	
11-2		Bronze Bell Cast by Buddhist Monk Sain 사인비구 제작 동종 - 문경김룡사동종 思印比丘 製作 銅鍾 - 聞慶金龍寺銅鍾	Gimcheon, North Gyeongsang	2000-02-15	
11-3		Bronze Bell Cast by Buddhist Monk Sain 사인비구 제작 동종 - 홍천수타사동종 思印比丘 製作 銅鍾 - 洪川壽陀寺銅鍾	Hongcheon County, Gangwon	2000-02-15	
11-4		Bronze Bell Cast by Buddhist Monk Sain 사인비구 제작 동종 - 안성청룡사동종 思印比丘 製作 銅鍾 - 安城靑龍寺銅鍾	Anseong, Gyeonggi	2000-02-15	
11-5		Bronze Bell Cast by Buddhist Monk Sain 사인비구 제작 동종 - 서울화계사동종 思印比丘製作 銅鍾 - 서울華溪寺銅鍾	Gangbuk District, Seoul	2000-02-15	
11-6		Bronze Bell Cast by Buddhist Monk Sain 사인비구 제작 동종 - 통도사동종 思印比丘 製作 銅鍾 - 通度寺銅鍾	Yangsan, South Gyeongsang	2000-02-15	
11-7		Bronze Bell of Uiwang Cheonggyesa Temple 사인비구 제작 동종 - 의왕청계사동종 思印比丘 製作 銅鍾 - 儀旺淸溪寺銅鍾	Uiwang, Gyeonggi	2000-02-15	
569-22		Calligraphy by An Jung-geun 안중근의사유묵 - 국가안위노심초사 安重根義士遺墨 - 國家安危勞心焦思	Jung District, Seoul	2000-02-15	
569-23		Calligraphy by An Jung-geun 안중근의사유묵 - 위국헌신군인본분 安重根義士遺墨 - 爲國獻身軍人本分	Jung District, Seoul	2000-02-15	
1299		Three-story Stone Pagoda of Boansa Temple, Goesan 괴산 보안사 삼층석탑 槐山 寶安寺 三層石塔	Goesan County, North Chungcheong	2000-08-04, 2010-12-27 renamed	
1300		Hongjeam Hermitage of Haeinsa Temple, Hapcheon 합천 해인사 홍제암 陜川 海印寺 弘濟庵	Hapcheon County, South Gyeongsang	2000-09-28	
1301		Stupa of Buddhist Monk Samyeong and Stele at Hongjeam Hermitage of Haeinsa Temple, Hapcheon 합천 해인사 홍제암 사명대사탑 및 석장비 陜川 海印寺 弘濟庵 四溟大師塔 및 石藏碑	Hapcheon County, South Gyeongsang	2000-09-28, 2010-12-27 renamed	
1302		Buddhist Painting of Cheongnyongsa Temple (Buddha Giving a Sermon) 청룡사감로탱 靑龍寺甘露幀	Anseong, Gyeonggi	2000-10-16	
1303		Transcription of the Diamond Sutra, the Lotus Sutra, and Buddhist Monk Yeongga's Invocation in Gold on White Paper 백지금니금강 및 보문발원 白紙金泥金剛 및 普門發願	Gimcheon, North Gyeongsang	2000-12-22	
1304		Royal Certificate of Meritorious Subject Issued to Yu Mong-in 유몽인위성공신교서 柳夢寅衛聖功臣敎書	Goheung County, South Jeolla	2000-12-22	
1305		Portrait of Kim Wan 김완초상 金完 肖像	Yeongam County, South Jeolla	2000-12-22	
772-4		Vajracchedika prajnaparamita Sutra (The Diamond Sutra) with Commentaries by Three Masters, Volume 2 금강경삼가해 권2 金剛經三家解 卷二	Dalseo District, Daegu	2001-08-03	
1306-1		Saddharmapundarika Sutra (The Lotus Sutra) 묘법연화경 妙法蓮華經	Gimcheon, North Gyeongsang	2001-01-02	
1306-2		Saddharmapundarika Sutra (The Lotus Sutra) 묘법연화경 妙法蓮華經	서울 중랑구 숙선옹주로 69	2019-03-06	
1307		Daeungjeon Hall of Neunggasa Temple, Goheung 고흥 능가사 대웅전 高興 楞伽寺 大雄殿	Goheung County, South Jeolla	2001-02-23	
1308		Royal Certificate of Meritorious Subject Issued to Hong Jin 홍진 호성공신교서 洪進 扈聖功臣敎書	Hongcheon County, Gangwon	2001-02-23	
1309		Epigraph for the Incense Burial Ceremony in Eomgil-ri, Yeongam 영암 엄길리 암각 매향명 靈巖 奄吉里 岩刻 埋香銘	Yeongam County, South Jeolla	2001-04-17, 2010-12-27 renamed	
1310		Daeungjeon Hall of Bulhoesa Temple, Naju 나주 불회사 대웅전 羅州 佛會寺 大雄殿	Naju, South Jeolla	2001-04-17	
1311		Daeungjeon Hall of Seonamsa Temple, Suncheon 순천 선암사 대웅전 順天 仙巖寺 大雄殿	Suncheon, South Jeolla	2001-06-08	
1312		Seated Amitabha Buddha Triad of Muwisa Temple, Gangjin 강진 무위사 아미타여래삼존좌상 康津 無爲寺 阿彌陀如來三尊坐像	Gangjin County, South Jeolla	2001-08-03	
~~1313~~		~~무위사극락전아미타후불벽화~~; ~~無爲寺極樂殿阿彌陀後佛壁畵~~	Gangjin County, South Jeolla	2001-08-03, 2009-09-02 removed, made National Treasure No. 313	
1314		Buddhist Painting in Geungnakjeon Hall of Muwisa Temple (Avalokitesvara in White Robe) 무위사극락전백의관음도 無爲寺極樂殿白衣觀音圖	Gangjin County, South Jeolla	2001-08-03	
1315		Mural Paintings in Geungnakjeon Hall of Muwisa Temple 무위사극락전내벽사면벽화 無爲寺極樂殿內壁四面壁畵	Gangjin County, South Jeolla	2001-08-03	
1316		Hanging Painting of Yulgoksa Temple 율곡사괘불탱 栗谷寺掛佛幀	Sancheong County, South Gyeongsang	2001-08-03	
1317		Hanging Painting and Storage Chest of Unheungsa Temple 운흥사괘불탱및궤 雲興寺掛佛幀및櫃	Goseong County, South Gyeongsang	2001-08-03	
1318		Old and New Celestial Charts 신·구법천문도 新·舊法天文圖	Jongno District, Seoul	2001-08-03	
1319		Gyeongjinnyeon daetongnyeok (Calendar of Gyeongjin Year) 경진년대통력 庚辰年大統曆	Jongno District, Seoul	2001-08-03	
1320		Yenyeom mita doryang chambeop (Contrition in the Name of Amitabha Buddha), Volume 7 예념미타도량참법 권7 禮念彌陀道場懺法 卷七	Dalseo District, Daegu	2001-08-03	
1321		Muye jebo beonyeok sokjip (Sequel to the Book of Martial Arts) 무예제보번역속집 武藝諸譜飜譯續集	Dalseo District, Daegu	2001-08-03	
1322		Five-story Stone Pagoda in Gagok-ri, Gokseong 곡성 가곡리 오층석탑 谷城 柯谷里 五層石塔	Gokseong County, South Jeolla	2001-09-21, 2010-12-27 renamed	
1323		Stone Lanterns in Front of the Tomb of Bak Jung-son, Paju 파주 공효공 박중손묘 장명등 坡州 恭孝公 朴仲孫墓 長明燈	Paju, Gyeonggi	2001-09-21, 2010-12-27 renamed	
1324		Rock-carved Standing Bodhisattva in Soraesan Mountain, Siheung 시흥 소래산 마애보살입상 始興 蘇萊山 磨崖菩薩立像	경기 시흥시 대야동 산140-3	2001-09-21, 2010-08-25 renamed	
1325		Bronze Bell of Naksujeong Pavilion (Presumed) 전 낙수정 동종 傳 樂壽亭 銅鍾	Jeonju, North Jeolla	2001-09-21	
1326		Buddhist Painting of Sangwonsa Temple, Hamchang (Four Buddhas) 함창상원사사불회탱 咸昌上院寺四佛會幀	Yongsan District, Seoul	2001-10-25	
1327		Stone Seated Ksitigarbha Bodhisattva 석조지장보살좌상 石造地藏菩薩坐像	Yongsan District, Seoul	2001-10-25	
1328		Giyeonghoedo (Gathering of Elders) 기영회도 耆英會圖	Yongsan District, Seoul	2001-10-25	
1329		White Porcelain Octagonal Water Dropper with Painting of Eight Scenic Spots of Sosang River in Underglaze Cobalt Blue 백자 청화소상팔경문 팔각연적 白磁 靑畵瀟湘八景文 八角硯適	Yongsan District, Seoul	2001-10-25	
1330		Buddhist Painting of Yongmunsa Temple, Yecheon (The Eight Great Events) 예천용문사팔상탱 醴泉龍門寺八相幀	Gimcheon, North Gyeongsang	2001-10-25	
419-2		Samguk yusa (Memorabilia of the Three Kingdoms), Volume 2 삼국유사 권2 三國遺事 卷二	Jung District, Seoul	2002-10-19	
419-3		Samguk yusa (Memorabilia of the Three Kingdoms), Volumes 4 and 5 삼국유사 권4~5 三國遺事 卷四~五	Geumjeong District, Busan	2002-10-19	
419-4		Samguk yusa (Memorabilia of the Three Kingdoms), Volumes 3-5 삼국유사 권3~5 三國遺事 卷三~五	Seongbuk District, Seoul	2002-10-19	
~~419-5~~		~~삼국유사~~; ~~三國遺事~~	~~서울 관악구 신림2동 산56-1 서울대학교규장각~~	2002-10-19, 2003-04-14 removed, made National Treasure No. 306-2	
772-3		Vajracchedika prajnaparamita Sutra (The Diamond Sutra) with Commentaries by Three Masters, Volume 1 금강경삼가해 권1 金剛經三家解 卷一	Jangheung County, South Jeolla	2002-08-05	
850-2		Daedong yeojido (Map of the Great East) 대동여지도 大東輿地圖	Jongno District, Seoul	2002-12-07	
1331		Hanging Painting of Heungguksa Temple (Rocana Buddha) 흥국사노사나불괘불탱 興國寺盧舍那佛掛佛幀	Yeosu, South Jeolla	2002-01-02	
1332		Buddhist Painting of Heungguksa Temple (Avalokitesvara Bodhisattva) 흥국사수월관음도 興國寺水月觀音圖	Yeosu, South Jeolla	2002-01-02	
1333		Buddhist Painting of Heungguksa Temple (Sixteen Arhats) 흥국사십육나한도 興國寺十六羅漢圖	Yeosu, South Jeolla	2002-01-02	
1334-1		Documents Related to U Bae-seon's Righteous Army 화원 우배선 의병진 관련자료-군공책 花園 禹拜善 義兵陳 關聯資料-軍功冊	Dalseo District, Daegu	2002-01-02	
1334-2		Documents Related to U Bae-seon's Righteous Army 화원 우배선 의병진 관련자료-교지(교첩) 花園 禹拜善 義兵陳 關聯資料-敎旨(敎牒)	Suseong District, Daegu	2002-01-02	
1335		Daejang illamjip (Essentials of Buddhist Sutras) 대장일람집 大藏一覽集	Dalseo District, Daegu	2002-01-02	
1336		Neungpagyo Bridge of Geonbongsa Temple, Goseong 고성 건봉사 능파교 高城 乾鳳寺 凌波橋	Goseong County, Gangwon	2002-02-06, 2010-12-27 renamed	
1337		Rainbow Bridge of Yuksongjeong Pavilion, Goseong 고성 육송정 홍교 高城 六松亭 虹橋	Goseong County, Gangwon	2002-02-06, 2010-12-27 renamed	
1338		East and West Three-story Stone Pagodas of Yongamsa Temple, Okcheon 옥천 용암사 동·서 삼층석탑 沃川 龍岩寺 東·西 三層石塔	Okcheon County, North Chungcheong	2002-03-12, 2010-12-27 renamed	
1339		Hanging Painting of Odeoksa Temple 오덕사괘불탱 五德寺掛佛幀	Buyeo County, South Chungcheong	2002-07-03	
1340		Hanging Painting of Cheoneunsa Temple 천은사괘불탱 泉隱寺掛佛幀	Gurye County, South Jeolla	2002-07-03	
1341		Hanging Painting of Dorimsa Temple 도림사괘불탱 道林寺掛佛幀	Gokseong County, South Jeolla	2002-07-03	
1342		Hanging Painting of Mihwangsa Temple 미황사괘불탱 美黃寺掛佛幀	Haenam County, South Jeolla	2002-07-03	
1343		Hanging Painting of Dabosa Temple 다보사괘불탱 多寶寺掛佛幀	Naju, South Jeolla	2002-07-03	
1344		Hanging Painting of Geumtapsa Temple 금탑사괘불탱 金塔寺掛佛幀	Goheung County, South Jeolla	2002-07-03	
1345		Hanging Painting of Manyeonsa Temple 만연사괘불탱 萬淵寺掛佛幀	Hwasun County, South Jeolla	2002-07-03	
1346		Stupa of Buddhist Monk Soyo at Baegyangsa Temple, Jangseong 장성 백양사 소요대사탑 長城 白羊寺 逍遙大師塔	Jangseong County, South Jeolla	2002-09-25, 2010-12-27 renamed	
1347		Stupa of Buddhist Monk Seosan at Daeheungsa Temple, Haenam 해남 대흥사 서산대사탑 海南 大興寺 西山大師塔	Haenam County, South Jeolla	2002-09-25, 2010-12-27 renamed	
1348		Reliquaries from the West Five-story Stone Pagoda of Hwaeomsa Temple 화엄사 서오층석탑 사리장엄구 華嚴寺 西五層石塔 舍利莊嚴具	Gurye County, South Jeolla	2002-10-19	
1349		Bronze Bell of Taeansa Temple, Gokseong 곡성 태안사 동종 谷城 泰安寺 銅鍾	Gokseong County, South Jeolla	2002-10-19	
1350		Hanging Painting of Tongdosa Temple (Sakyamuni Buddha) 통도사석가여래괘불탱 通度寺釋迦如來掛佛幀	Yangsan, South Gyeongsang	2002-10-19	
1351		Hanging Painting of Tongdosa Temple 통도사괘불탱 通度寺掛佛幀	Yangsan, South Gyeongsang	2002-10-19	
1352		Buddhist Painting of Tongdosa Temple (Illustration of the Avatamsaka Sutra) 통도사화엄탱 通度寺華嚴幀	Yangsan, South Gyeongsang	2002-10-19	
1353		Buddhist Painting of Tongdosa Temple (The Vulture Peak Assembly) 통도사영산회상탱 通度寺靈山會上幀	Yangsan, South Gyeongsang	2002-10-19	
1354		Bronze Incense Burner with Silver-inlaid Design of Tongdosa Temple 통도사 청동 은입사 향완 通度寺 靑銅銀入絲香垸	Yangsan, South Gyeongsang	2002-10-19	
1355		Abhidharma dhatu kaya pada Sastra (Treatise on Body Elements According to the Abhidharma Path), the First Tripitaka Koreana Edition, Volume 2 초조본 아비달마계신족론 권하 初雕本 阿毗達磨界身足論 卷下	Jongno District, Seoul	2002-10-19	
1356		Prakaranaryavaca Sastra (Acclamation of the Holy Teaching), the First Tripitaka Koreana Edition, Volume 3 초조본 현양성교론 권3 初雕本 顯揚聖敎論 卷三	Jongno District, Seoul	2002-10-19	
1357		Relics Related to Buddhist Monk Seosan in Daeheungsa Temple, Haenam 해남 대흥사 서산대사유물 海南 大興寺 西山大師遺物	Haenam County, South Jeolla	2002-12-07	
1358-1		Dongyeodo (Atlas of the Eastern State) 동여도 東輿圖	Jongno District, Seoul	2002-12-07	
1359		Reliquaries from the East Three-story Stone Pagoda at Gameunsa Temple Site 감은사지 동삼층석탑 사리장엄구 感恩寺址 東三層石塔 舍利莊嚴具	Yongsan District, Seoul	2002-12-07	
569-25		Calligraphy by An Jung-geun 안중근의사유묵 - 언충신행독경만방가행 安重根義士遺墨 - 言忠信行篤敬蠻邦可行	Jung District, Seoul	2003-04-14	
1360		Clay Seated Vairocana Buddha Triad of Beopjusa Temple, Boeun 보은 법주사 소조비로자나삼불좌상 報恩 法住寺 塑造毘盧遮那三佛坐像	Boeun County, North Chungcheong	2003-02-03	
1361		Wooden Seated Avalokitesvara Bodhisattva of Beopjusa Temple, Boeun 보은 법주사 목조관음보살좌상 報恩 法住寺 木造觀音菩薩坐像	Boeun County, North Chungcheong	2003-02-03	
1362		Dry-lacquered Seated Avalokitesvara Bodhisattva of Naksansa Temple, Yangyang 양양 낙산사 건칠관음보살좌상 襄陽 洛山寺 乾漆觀音菩薩坐像	Yangyang County, Gangwon	2003-02-03	
1363		Buddhist Painting in Daeungjeon Hall of Hwaeomsa Temple (Buddha Triad) 화엄사대웅전삼신불탱 華嚴寺大雄殿三身佛幀	Gurye County, South Jeolla	2003-02-03	
1364		Buddhist Painting in Daeungjeon Hall of Ssanggyesa Temple (Buddha Triad) 쌍계사대웅전삼세불탱 雙磎寺大雄殿三世佛幀	Hadong County, South Gyeongsang	2003-02-03	
1365		Buddhist Painting in Palsangjeon Hall of Ssanggyesa Temple (The Eight Great Events) 쌍계사팔상전팔상탱 雙磎寺八相殿八相幀	Hadong County, South Gyeongsang	2003-02-03	
~~1366~~		~~송광사화엄전화엄탱~~; ~~松廣寺華嚴殿華嚴幀~~	~~Suncheon, South Jeolla~~	2003-02-03, 2009-09-02 removed, made National Treasure No. 314	
1367		Hanging Scroll Behind the Sakyamuni Buddha and Paintings of Sixteen Arhats in Eungjindang Hall of Songgwangsa Temple 송광사응진당석가모니후불탱.십육나한탱 松廣寺應眞堂釋迦牟尼後佛幀.十六羅漢幀	Suncheon, South Jeolla	2003-02-03	
1368		Hanging Scroll Behind the Buddha and Paintings (The Eight Great Events ) in Yeongsanjeon Hall of Songgwangsa Temple 송광사영산전후불탱.팔상탱 松廣寺靈山殿後佛幀.八相幀	Suncheon, South Jeolla	2003-02-03	
1369		Beonyeok myeonguijip (Dictionary of Sanskrit-Chinese Translation of Buddhist Terms) 번역명의집 飜譯名義集	Dalseo District, Daegu	2003-02-03	
1370		Stupa of Buddhist Monk Tongil at Gagyeonsa Temple, Goesan 괴산 각연사 통일대사탑 槐山 覺淵寺 通一大師塔	Goesan County, North Chungcheong	2003-03-14, 2010-12-27 renamed	
1371		Three-story Stone Pagoda of Banyasa Temple, Yeongdong 영동 반야사 삼층석탑 永同 般若寺 三層石塔	Yeongdong County, North Chungcheong	2003-03-14, 2010-12-27 renamed	
1372		Stone Bridge at Gomakcheon Stream, Hampyeong 함평 고막천 석교 咸平 古幕川 石橋	Hampyeong County, South Jeolla	2003-03-14, 2010-12-27 renamed	
1373		Gilt-bronze Celestial Chart of Tongdosa Temple, Yangsan 양산 통도사 금동천문도 梁山 通度寺 金銅天文圖	Yangsan, South Gyeongsang	2003-04-14	
1374		Hanging Painting of Yongheungsa Temple (Buddha Triad) 용흥사삼불회괘불탱 龍興寺三佛會掛佛幀	Sangju, North Gyeongsang	2003-04-14	
1375		Reliquaries from the Octagonal Nine-story Stone Pagoda of Woljeongsa Temple 월정사 팔각구층석탑 사리장엄구 月精寺 八角九層石塔 舍利莊嚴具	Pyeongchang County, Gangwon	2003-06-26	
1376		Documents Written in the Tibetan Language at Songgwangsa Temple, Suncheon 순천 송광사 티베트문 법지 順天 松廣寺 티베트文 法旨	Suncheon, South Jeolla	2003-06-26	
1377		Wooden Seated Sakyamuni Buddha Triad of Bulgapsa Temple, Yeonggwang 영광 불갑사 목조석가여래삼불좌상 靈光 佛甲寺 木造釋迦如來三佛坐像	Yeonggwang County, South Jeolla	2003-06-26	
1378		Wooden Seated Sakyamuni Buddha Triad and Four Standing Bodhisattvas of Ssanggyesa Temple, Hadong 하동 쌍계사 목조석가여래삼불좌상 및 사보살입상 河東 雙磎寺 木造釋迦如來三佛坐像 및 四菩薩立像	Hadong County, South Gyeongsang	2003-08-21	
1379		Hanging Painting of Chukseosa Temple 축서사괘불탱 鷲棲寺掛佛幀	Bonghwa County, North Gyeongsang	2003-08-21	
1380		Royal Certificate of Meritorious Subject Issued to Sin Gyeong-haeng and Related Documents 신경행 청난공신교서 및 관련문적 辛景行 淸難功臣敎書 및 關聯文籍	Cheongju, North Chungcheong	2003-08-21	
1381		Wooden Seated Sakyamuni Buddha Triad and Excavated Relics of Sudeoksa Temple, Yesan 예산 수덕사 목조석가여래삼불좌상 및 복장유물 禮山 修德寺 木造釋迦如來三佛坐像 및 腹藏遺物	Yesan County, South Chungcheong	2003-11-14	
1382		Celadon Inkstone with Inlaid Chrysanthemum and Peony Design and Inscription of "Sinchuk Year" 청자 상감‘신축’명 국화모란문 벼루 靑磁 象嵌‘辛丑’銘 菊花牡丹文 硯	Yongsan District, Seoul	2003-12-30	
1383		Celadon Prunus Vase with Grass, Insect, and Bird Design in Underglaze Iron 청자 철화초충조문 매병 靑磁 鐵畵草蟲鳥文 梅甁	Yongsan District, Seoul	2003-12-30	
1384		Celadon Flat Bottle with Inlaid Willow, Egret, Plum, and Bamboo Design 청자 상감유로매죽문 편병 靑磁 象嵌柳鷺梅竹文 扁甁	Yongsan District, Seoul	2003-12-30	
1385		Celadon Prunus Vase with Cloud and Dragon Design in Relief 청자 양각운룡문 매병 靑磁 陽刻雲龍文 梅甁	Yongsan District, Seoul	2003-12-30	
1386		Celadon Prunus Vase with Inlaid Fish and Dragon Design 청자 상감어룡문 매병 靑磁 象嵌魚龍文 梅甁	Yongsan District, Seoul	2003-12-30	
1387		Buncheong Barrel-shaped Vessel with Peony Design in Underglaze Iron 분청사기 철화모란문 장군 粉靑沙器 鐵畵牡丹文 獐本	Yongsan District, Seoul	2003-12-30	
1388		Buncheong Flat Bottle with Sgraffito Lotus Design 분청사기 박지연화문 편병 粉靑沙器 剝地蓮花文 扁甁	Yongsan District, Seoul	2003-12-30	
1389		Celadon Prunus Vase with Inlaid Plum, Bamboo, and Willow Design and Inscription of ‘Jangjinju’ Poem 청자 상감‘장진주’시명 매죽양류문 매병 靑磁 象嵌‘將進酒’詩銘 梅竹楊柳文 梅甁	Yongsan District, Seoul	2003-12-30	
1390		White Porcelain Jar with Autumn Landscape Design in Underglaze Cobalt Blue 백자 청화동정추월문 항아리 白磁 靑畵洞庭秋月文 壺	Yongsan District, Seoul	2003-12-30	
1391		White Porcelain Bottle with Inlaid and Openwork Peony Design 백자 상감투각모란문 병 白磁 象嵌透刻牡丹文 甁	Yongsan District, Seoul	2003-12-30	
1392		Hwajogujado (Flowers, Birds, and Puppies) by Yi Am 이암필 화조구자도 李巖筆 花鳥狗子圖	Yongsan District, Seoul	2003-12-30	
1393		Chuseongbudo (Theme of Chuseongbu, Sounds of Autumn) by Kim Hong-do 김홍도필 추성부도 金弘道筆 秋聲賦圖	Yongsan District, Seoul	2003-12-30	
1394		Folding Screen of Gyeonggi gamyeongdo (Gyeonggi-do Provincial Office) 경기감영도 병풍 京畿監營圖 屛風	Yongsan District, Seoul	2003-12-30	
941-2		Letters of King Seonjo to Song Eon-sin and Portrait of Song Eon-sin 송언신초상 宋言愼肖像	Yongin, Gyeonggi	2004-05-07	
1174-2		Royal Certificate of Meritorious Subject Issued to Yi Jung-ro and Portrait of Yi Jung-ro 이중로정사공신교서 및 초상 - 이중로 초상 李重老靖社功臣敎書 및 肖像 - 李重老肖像	Yongin, Gyeonggi	2004-05-07	
1395		Stele for State Preceptor Doseon and Master Sumi of Dogapsa Temple, Yeongam 영암 도갑사 도선국사·수미선사비 靈巖 道岬寺 道詵國師·守眉禪師碑	Yeongam County, South Jeolla	2004-01-26, 2010-12-27 renamed	
1396		Stele for the Construction of Baengnyeonsa Temple, Gangjin 강진 백련사 사적비 康津 白蓮寺 事蹟碑	Gangjin County, South Jeolla	2004-01-26, 2010-12-27 renamed	
1397		Hanging Scroll Behind the Buddha in Yeongguksa Temple (The Vulture Peak Assembly) 영국사영산회후불탱 寧國寺靈山會後佛幀	Jongno District, Seoul	2004-03-03	
1398		Celadon Duck-shaped Ewer with Inlaid Design 청자 상감오리모양 주전자 靑磁 象嵌鴨形 注子	Seongnam, Gyeonggi	2004-03-03	
1399		Celadon Gourd-shaped Ewer with Paste-on-paste Dots and Line Design 청자 퇴화선문 표주박모양 주전자 靑磁 堆花線文 瓢形 注子	Jongno District, Seoul	2004-03-03	
1400		Buncheong Barrel-shaped Vessel with Inlaid Peony and Scroll Design 분청사기 상감모란당초문 장군 粉靑沙器 象嵌牡丹唐草文 獐本	Seongnam, Gyeonggi	2004-03-03	
1401		Rock-carved Buddhas in Bonghwang-ri, Chungju 충주 봉황리 마애불상군 忠州 鳳凰里 磨崖佛像群	Chungju, North Chungcheong	2004-03-03, 2010-08-25 renamed	
1402		Munseonggong Shrine of Sosuseowon Confucian Academy, Yeongju 영주 소수서원 문성공묘 榮州 紹修書院 文成公廟	Yeongju, North Gyeongsang	2004-04-06	
1403		Lecture Hall of Sosuseowon Confucian Academy, Yeongju 영주 소수서원 강학당 榮州 紹修書院 講學堂	Yeongju, North Gyeongsang	2004-04-06	
1404		Bongsa Joseon changhwa sigwon (Poems Shared by Envoys in Joseon 봉사조선창화시권 奉使朝鮮倡和詩卷	Yongsan District, Seoul	2004-05-07	
1405		Bihaedang Sosang palgyeong sicheop (Album of Poems Compiled by Prince Anpyeong) 비해당소상팔경시첩 匪懈堂瀟湘八景詩帖	Yongsan District, Seoul	2004-05-07	
1406		Isipsam sangdaehoedo (Gathering of 23 Officials of Inspector-general) and Royal Edict Issued to Kim Jong-han 이십삼 상대회도 및 김종한 교지 二十三 霜臺會圖 및 金從漢 敎旨	Yongin, Gyeonggi	2004-05-07	
1407		Brahmajala Sutra (The Sutra of Brahma’s Net) 범망경보살계본 및 수보살계법 梵網經菩薩戒本 및 受菩薩戒法	Cheongju, North Chungcheong	2004-05-07	
1408		Vajracchedika prajnaparamita Sutra (The Diamond Sutra) 금강반야바라밀경 金剛般若波羅蜜經	Cheongju, North Chungcheong	2004-05-07	
1409		Commentary on the Avatamsaka Sutra (The Flower Garland Sutra), Volumes 48, 64, and 83 대방광불화엄경소 권48, 64, 83 大方廣佛華嚴經疏 卷四十八, 六十四, 八十三	Cheongju, North Chungcheong	2004-05-07	
1410		Gilt-bronze Dragon Finial 금동 당간 용두 金銅幢竿龍頭	Gyeongju, North Gyeongsang	2004-06-26	
1411		Stone Tablet with Inscription of Oath of the Imsin Year 임신서기석 壬申誓記石	Gyeongju, North Gyeongsang	2004-06-26	
1412		Transcription of Avatamsaka Sutra (The Flower Garland Sutra) in Gold on Indigo Paper, Volume 15 감지금니대방광불화엄경 권15 紺紙金泥大方廣佛華嚴經 卷十五	Gangnam District, Seoul	2004-06-26	
1413		Iron Pot of Beopjusa Temple, Boeun 보은 법주사 철솥 報恩 法住寺 鐵鑊	Boeun County, North Chungcheong	2004-08-31	
1414		Bronze Incense Burner with Inscription of "Bongeopsa Temple" 봉업사명청동향로 奉業寺銘靑銅香爐	Yongin, Gyeonggi	2004-08-31	
1415		Samhyeon sugan (Letters of Three Wise Men) 삼현수간 三賢手簡	Yongsan District, Seoul	2004-08-31	
1416		Stupa of Buddhist Monk Suam at Bokcheonam Hermitage of Beopjusa Temple, Boeun 보은 법주사 복천암 수암화상탑 報恩 法住寺 福泉庵 秀庵和尙塔	Boeun County, North Chungcheong	2004-10-07, 2010-12-27 renamed	
1417		Stone Standing Bodhisattva of Beopjusa Temple, Boeun 보은 법주사 석조희견보살입상 報恩 法住寺 石造喜見菩薩立像	Boeun County, North Chungcheong	2004-10-07, 2010-08-25 renamed	
1418		Stupa of Buddhist Monk Hakjo at Bokcheonam Hermitage of Beopjusa Temple, Boeun 보은 법주사 복천암 학조화상탑 報恩 法住寺 福泉庵 學祖和尙塔	Boeun County, North Chungcheong	2004-10-07, 2010-12-27 renamed	
1419		Hanging Painting (Sakyamuni Buddha) and Other Relics of Seonamsa Temple 선암사석가모니불괘불탱 및 부속유물일괄 仙巖寺釋迦牟尼佛掛佛幀 및 附屬遺物一括	Suncheon, South Jeolla	2004-11-26	
1420		Celadon Ewer and Saucer with Inlaid Peony and Willow Design 청자 상감모란양류문 주전자 및 승반 靑磁 象嵌牡丹楊柳文 注子 및 承盤	Yongsan District, Seoul	2004-11-26	
1421		Celadon Ewer and Saucer with Paste-on-paste Floral Design 청자 퇴화화문 주전자 및 승반 靑磁 堆花花文 注子 및 承盤	Yongsan District, Seoul	2004-11-26	
1422		Buncheong Jar with Inlaid Peony Design 분청사기 상감모란문 항아리 粉靑沙器 象嵌牡丹文 立壺	Yongsan District, Seoul	2004-11-26	
1423		Buncheong Barrel-shaped Vessel with Stamped Dots Design 분청사기 인화점문 장군 粉靑沙器 印花點文 獐本	Yongsan District, Seoul	2004-11-26	
~~1424~~		~~White Porcelain Jar~~; ~~백자대호~~; ~~白磁大壺~~	~~Yongsan District, Seoul~~	2004-11-26, 2007-12-17 removed, made National Treasure No. 309	
1425		White Porcelain Jar with Plum and Bamboo Design in Underglaze Iron 백자 철화매죽문 항아리 白磁 鐵畵梅竹文 立壺	Yongsan District, Seoul	2004-11-26	
