= Jincheon station =

Station of the Daegu Metro

118 진천 (보강병원) Jincheon (Bogang Hospital)
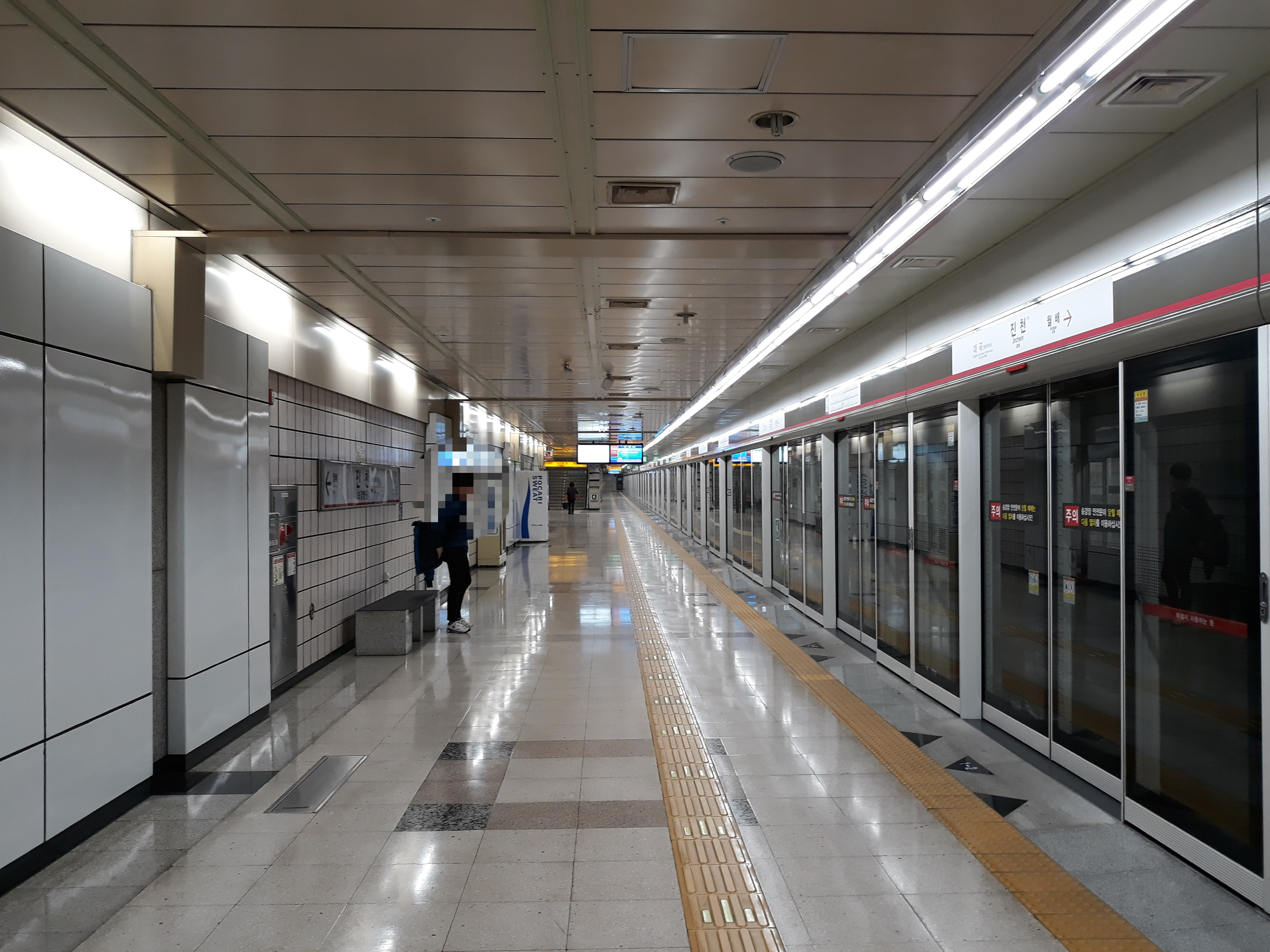
- Station platform

Korean name
- Hangul: 진천역
- Hanja: 辰泉驛
- Revised Romanization: Jincheonnyeok
- McCune–Reischauer: Chinch'ŏnnyŏk

General information
- Location: Jincheon-dong, Dalseo District, Daegu; South Korea
- Coordinates: 35°48′50″N 128°31′21″E
- Operator: Daegu Transportation Corporation
- Line: Line 1
- Platforms: 2
- Tracks: 2

Construction
- Structure type: Underground

Other information
- Station code: 118

History
- Opened: November 26, 1997

Services
Preceding station	Daegu Metro	Following station
Daegok towards Seolhwa–Myeonggok	Line 1	Wolbae towards Hayang
Location

Jincheon Station is a station of the Daegu Subway Line 1 in Jincheon-dong, Dalseo District, Daegu, South Korea. Jincheon Station is in Jincheon crossroads between Wolbaero and Jincheonno. Jincheon Station was a train terminal from November 26, 1997, to May 10, 2002, when Daegok Station was opened. The station has nothing to do with Jincheon-gun Chungcheongbukdo; the place of the station is Jincheon-dong.

The area around the station is composed of residential areas. To the north of the station, there used to be an old Wolbae Industrial Complex, but it is being developed sequentially as a residential district. Nearby are E-Mart Wolbae Branch, Wolbae Market, and bogang Hospital.

A safety gate was installed in February 2017.

== history ==
- November 26, 1997: Opened as a terminal station with the opening of Daegu Subway Line 1
- May 10, 2002: Converted to an intermediate station with the opening of the extension to Daegok Station
- February 5, 2017: Installed screen doors

== Station layout ==
G	Street Level
L1	Concourse	Faregates, Ticketing Machines, Station Control
L2; Platforms	Side platform, doors will open on the right
L2; Platforms	Southbound	← Line 1 toward Seolhwa–Myeonggok (Daegok)
L2; Platforms	Northbound	→ Line 1 toward Hayang (Wolbae) →
L2; Platforms	Side platform, doors will open on the right
