= Daegok station (Daegu Metro) =

Station of the Daegu Metro

117 대곡 (정부대구청사) Daegok (Central Gov't Office-Daegu)
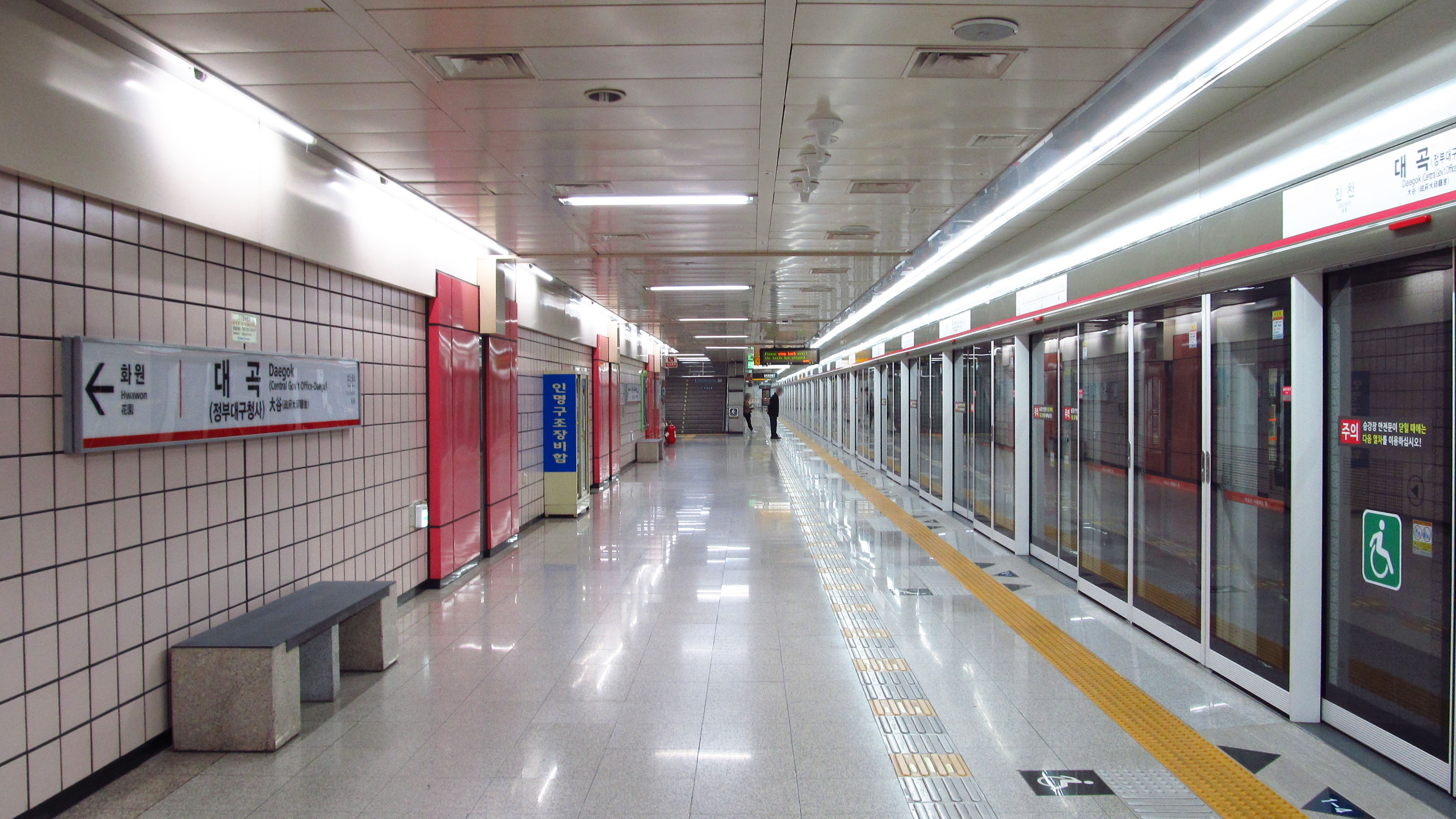
- Station platform

Korean name
- Hangul: 대곡역
- Hanja: 大谷驛
- Revised Romanization: Daegongnyeok
- McCune–Reischauer: Taegongnyŏk

General information
- Location: B2718 Biseul-ro, Dalseo District, Daegu; South Korea
- Coordinates: 35.809497°N 128.512584°E
- Operator: Daegu Metropolitan Transit Corporation
- Line: Line 1
- Platforms: 2
- Tracks: 2

Construction
- Structure type: Underground

Other information
- Station code: 117

History
- Opened: May 10, 2002

Services
Preceding station	Daegu Metro	Following station
Hwawon towards Seolhwa–Myeonggok	Line 1	Jincheon towards Hayang
Location

Daegok Station (Korean: 대곡역) is an underground of the Daegu Metro Line 1 of Daegu city railroad in Daegok-dong, Dalseo District, Daegu, South Korea. It is located on the boundary between Dalseo District Daegok-dong and Dalseong-gun Hwawon-eup Gura-ri. There are an exit and entrance for a Hwawon-eup Bolli-ri Bolli-jigu Bolli Greenvill. A southern extension into Dalseong-gun (county) was opened on September 8, 2016.

== Station layout ==
G	Street Level
L1	Concourse	Faregates, Ticketing Machines, Station Control
L2; Platforms	Side platform, doors will open on the right
L2; Platforms	Southbound	← Line 1 toward Seolhwa–Myeonggok (Hwawon)
L2; Platforms	Northbound	→ Line 1 toward Hayang (Jincheon) →
L2; Platforms	Side platform, doors will open on the right
