= Sangin station =

Station of the Daegu Metro

120 상인 (대구보훈병원) Sangin (Daegu Veterans Hospital)
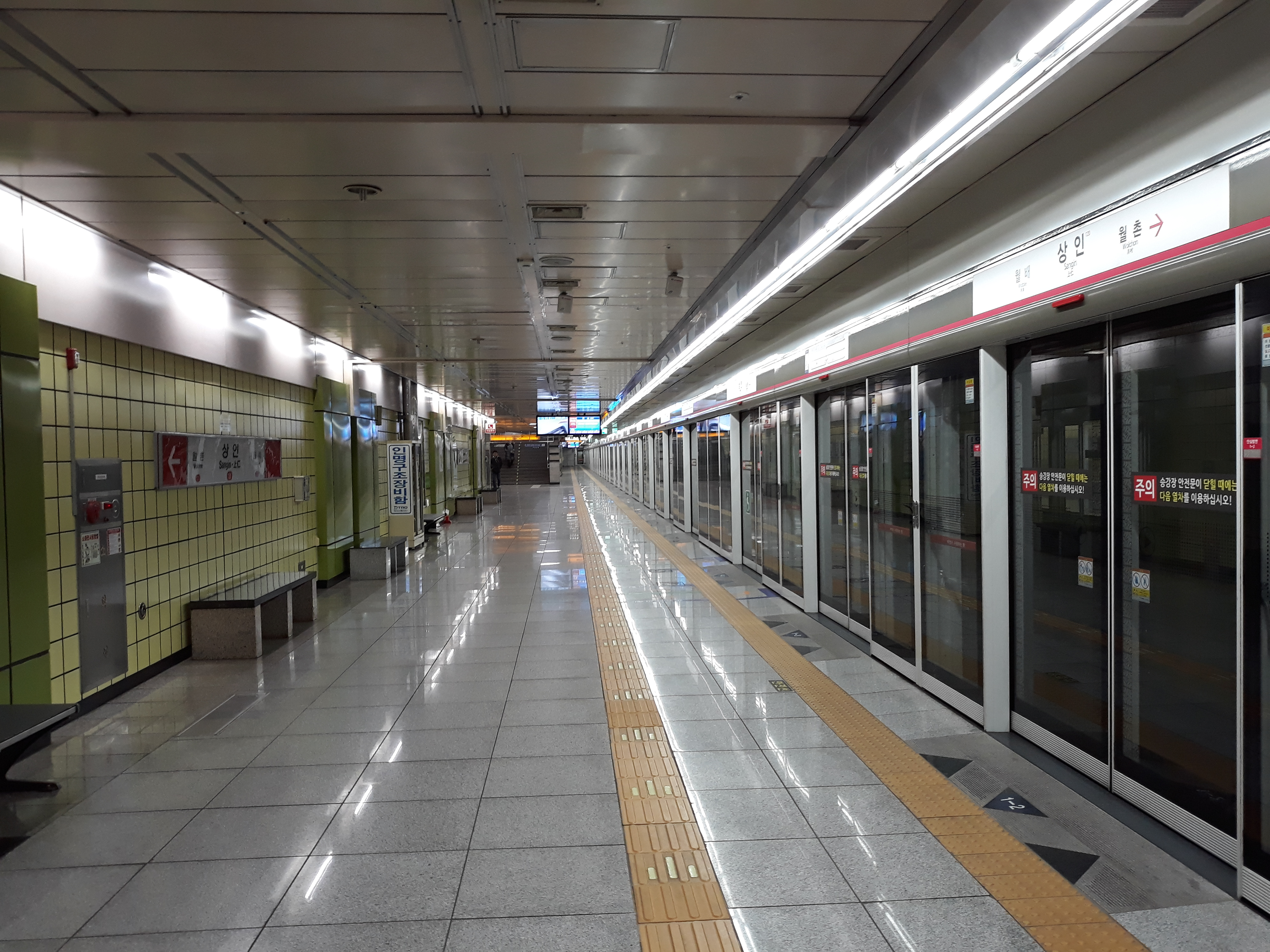
- Station platform

Korean name
- Hangul: 상인역
- Hanja: 上仁驛
- Revised Romanization: Sanginnyeok
- McCune–Reischauer: Sanginnyŏk

General information
- Location: Sangin-dong, Dalseo District, Daegu; South Korea
- Coordinates: 35°49′08″N 128°32′16″E
- Operator: DTRO
- Line: Daegu Metro Line 1
- Platforms: 2
- Tracks: 2

Construction
- Structure type: Underground

Other information
- Station code: 120

History
- Opened: November 26, 1997
Location

Sangin Station is a station of a city railroad of Daegu Metro Line 1 in Dalseo-gu Daegu, South Korea. It is located in Sangin crossroad. On April 28, 1995, there was an explosion with major damage. Sangin Station is one of the busiest stations outside downtown.

Preceding station	Daegu Metro	Following station
Wolbae towards Seolhwa–Myeonggok	Line 1	Wolchon towards Hayang
