= Sangin High School =

Sangin High School 상인고등학교

Location
- 24 Sangin-ro, Sangin-dong, Dalseo-gu; Daegu; South Korea

Information
- Type: Public
- Motto: Wisdom, Virtue, Health
- Established: 2001
- Principal: Seok Chang-won
- Deputy Principal: Wang Han-yeol
- Faculty: 90
- Gender: Boys and Girls
- Enrolment: 973
- Campus: 13,238 m^{2}
- Website: http://www.sangin.hs.kr/

Sangin High School is a public high school located in Dalseo-gu, Daegu, South Korea. It was established in 2001.
