= Hwawon station =

Station of the Daegu Metro

116 화원 Hwawon
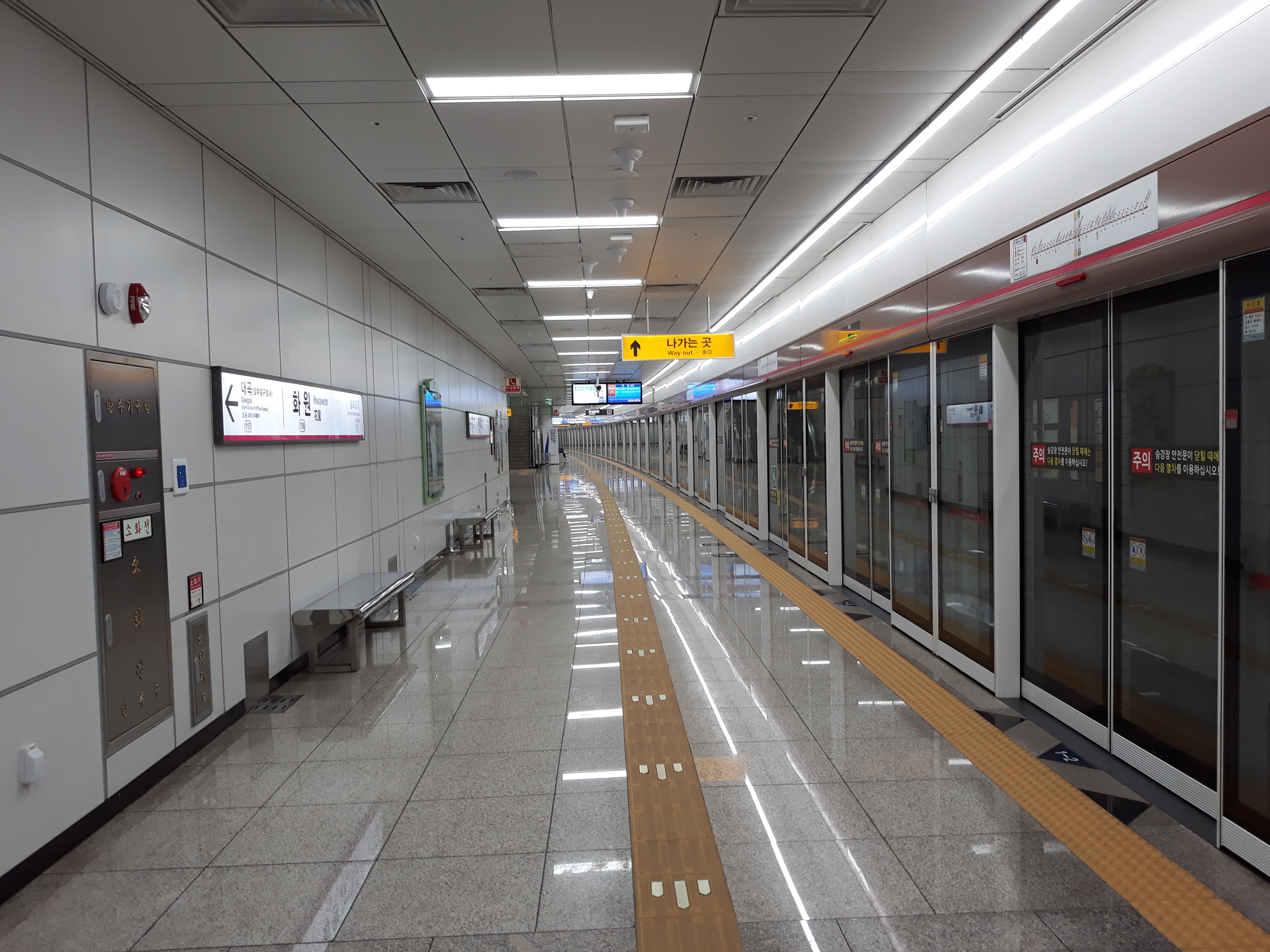
- Station platform

Korean name
- Hangul: 화원역
- Hanja: 花園驛
- RR: Hwawon-yeok
- MR: Hwawŏn-yŏk

General information
- Location: B2600 Biseul-ro, Hwawon-eup, Dalseong County, Daegu; South Korea
- Coordinates: 35.8043°N 128.5004°E
- Operator: DTRO
- Line: Line 1
- Platforms: 2
- Tracks: 2

Construction
- Structure type: Underground

Other information
- Station code: 116

History
- Opened: September 8, 2016

Services
Preceding station	Daegu Metro	Following station
Seolhwa–Myeonggok Terminus	Line 1	Daegok towards Hayang
Location

Hwawon Station is an underground station of the Daegu Metro Line 1 in Dalseong County Daegu, South Korea.

The station is connected to Seolhwa–Myeonggok station via Hwawon Bridge Hajeo Tunnel. Hwawon-eup office is located right next to the station, and the station is located in the center of the Hwawon-eup and apartment complex. From this station, you can transfer to the city bus access to the Flower Garden, Sammunjin, Dasan Culture Park, and Dasan-myeon, Goryeong-gun. There is Snake Mountain near at the station, and there is also the Hwawon Bridge Underground Tunnel, and the surrounding area is slightly higher, so the station is on the deep side.

== Station layout ==
G	Street Level
L1	Concourse	Faregates, Ticketing Machines, Station Control
L2; Platforms	Side platform, doors will open on the right
L2; Platforms	Southbound	← Line 1 toward Seolhwa–Myeonggok (Terminus)
L2; Platforms	Northbound	→ Line 1 toward Hayang (Daegok) →
L2; Platforms	Side platform, doors will open on the right

== List of exits ==
There are 4 exits at this station:

Exit No.	Image	Destinations
1		Hwawon Post Office; Hwawon Police Station; Hwawon Intersection; Hwawon Dongsan; Dasan-myeon
2		Hwawon Elementary School
3		Hwawon-eup Office; Hwawon-eup Clinic; Hannam Middle Beauty & Information High School; Dalseong-gun Election Commission; Bonrijigu
4		Daegu Bank Hwawon Branch; Cheonnae Yeongnam Mansion
