= Songhyeon station =

Station of the Daegu Metro

122 송현 (참좋은병원) Songhyeon (Chamjoeun Hospital)
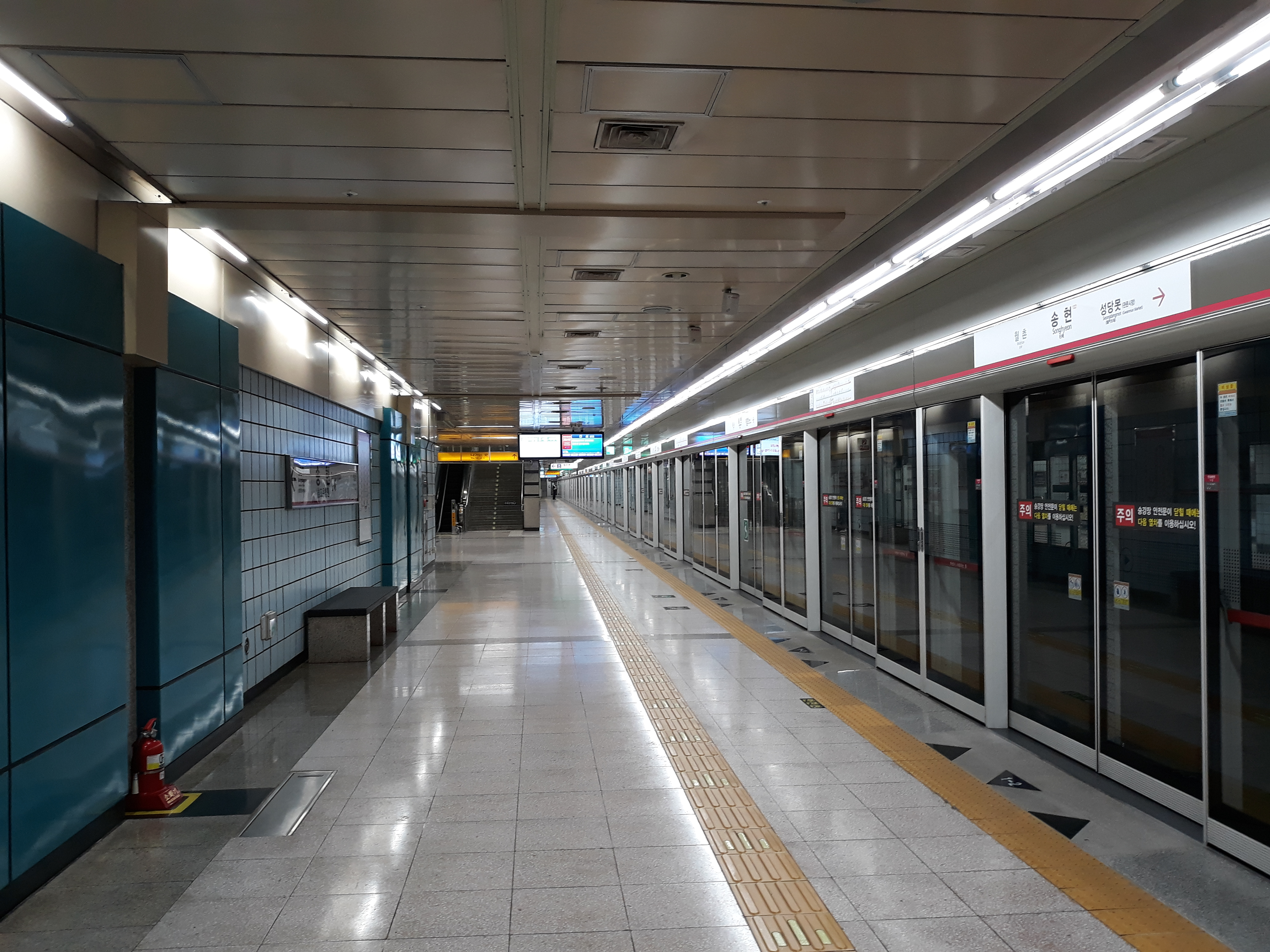
- Station platform

Korean name
- Hangul: 송현역
- Hanja: 松峴驛
- Revised Romanization: Songhyeonnyeok
- McCune–Reischauer: Songhyŏnnyŏk

General information
- Location: Songhyeon-dong, Dalseo District, Daegu; South Korea
- Coordinates: 35°49′52″N 128°33′06″E
- Operator: DTRO
- Line: Daegu Metro Line 1
- Platforms: 2
- Tracks: 2

Construction
- Structure type: Underground

Other information
- Station code: 122

History
- Opened: November 26, 1997
Location

Songhyeon Station is a station of Daegu Metro Line 1 in Dalseo-gu Daegu, South Korea.

== Year-The Number of Passengers ==
1997	1998	1999	2000	2001	2002	2003	2004	2005	2006	2007	2008	2009
3,507	3,881	4,195	undisclosed	3,932	3,978	2,438	3,592	3,677	4,420	4,145	4,188	4,153

Preceding station	Daegu Metro	Following station
Wolchon towards Seolhwa–Myeonggok	Line 1	Seobu Bus Terminal towards Hayang
