= Wolchon station =

Station of the Daegu Metro

Coordinates: 35°49′25″N 128°32′43″E

121 월촌 Wolchon
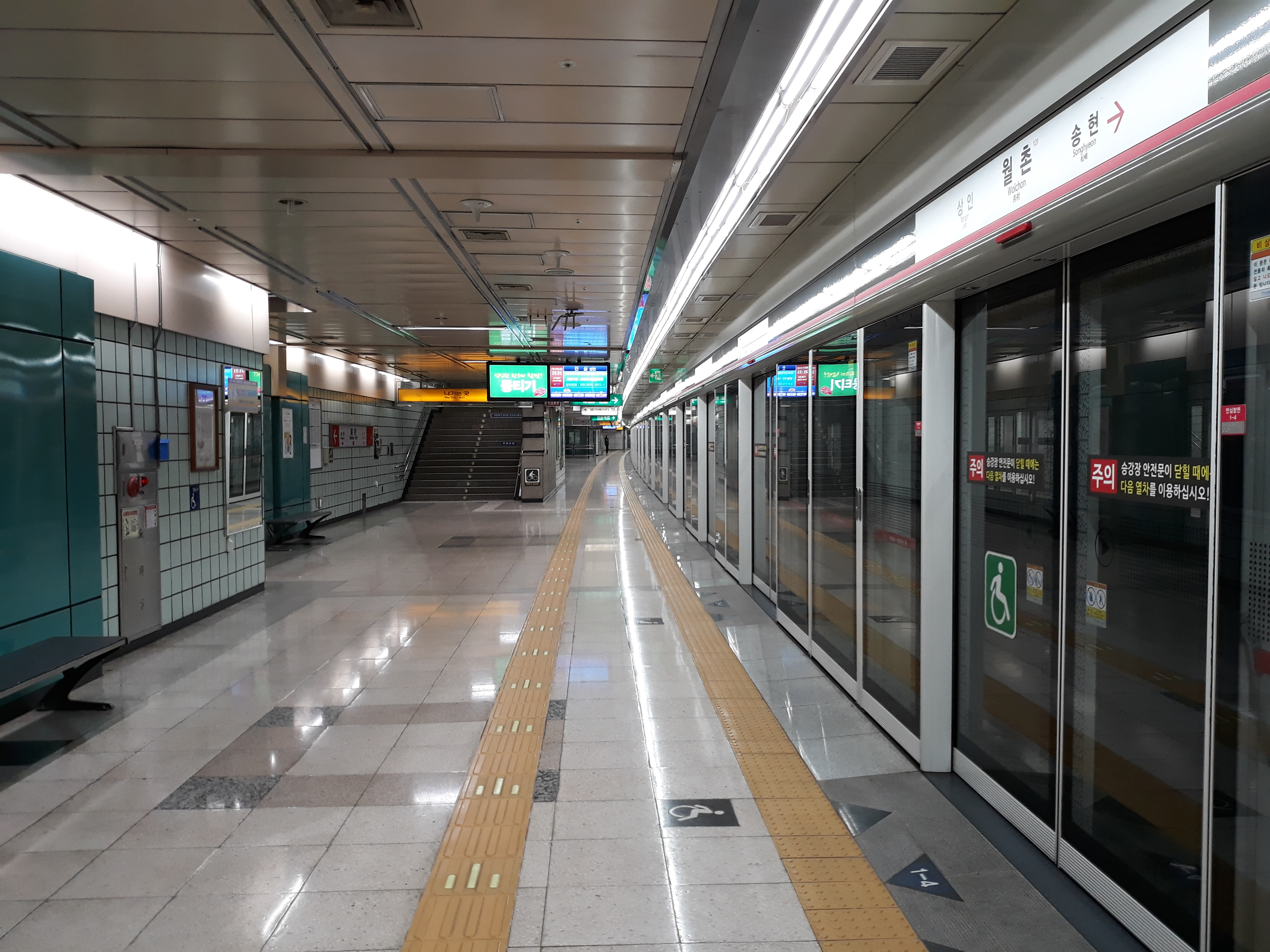
- Station platform

General information
- Location: Wolbae-ro, Dalseo District, Daegu; South Korea
- Operator: Daegu Transportation Corporation
- Line: Line 1
- Platforms: 2
- Tracks: 2

Construction
- Structure type: Underground

Other information
- Station code: 121

History
- Opened: November 26, 1997

Services
Preceding station	Daegu Metro	Following station
Sangin towards Seolhwa–Myeonggok	Line 1	Songhyeon towards Hayang
Location

Wolchon Station is an underground of Line 1 of the Daegu Metro in Dalseo District, Daegu, South Korea.

== Features ==
From this station, you can take the bus route 618 to Daegu Institute of Technology, Bonri-dong, and Cathedral East. There is a Daegu Youth Training Center nearby, and since there is a station at a large range, there is a lot of fluid population around the station, and there are many apartments and schools, so the utilization rate is not very good.

The Daegu Technical University is located near this station, and the exit information is also listed, but the Daegu Technical University is more close to the Seobu Bus Terminal station, but in fact the station with the closest distance from Daegu Technical University is Songhyeon station.

== List of exits ==
There are 8 exits at this station:

Exit No.	Image	Destinations
1		Daegu Industrial College, Woobang Songhyeon Heights, Hyoseong Elementary School, Bongdong Jugong Apartment, Songhyun Woobang Mansion
2		Gyeongbuk Machinery Technical High School, Daeseo Middle School
3		Hwaseong Park Dream 1 Apartment, Songhyeon Jugong 3 Complex
4		Sangin-dong Post Office, Dalseo Children's Library, Wolgok Historical Park, Wolgok Historical Museum, Nakdong Seowon, Hwaseong Park Dream 2 Apartment, Daeseo Elementary School, Wolchon Boseong Hwaseong Town Apartment
5		Daegu Youth Training Center, Daenam Elementary School, Jeonwon Park
6		Apsan Cheonggu Apartment, DGB Daegu Bank Wolchon Station Branch, Shinhan Clinic, Seojinhan Clinic
7		Songhyeon Classic Town, Guam Park
8		Songhyeon 2-dong, Songhyeon Wolseong Apartment, Songhyeon Elementary School
