= Wolbae station =

Station of the Daegu Metro

119 월배 Wolbae
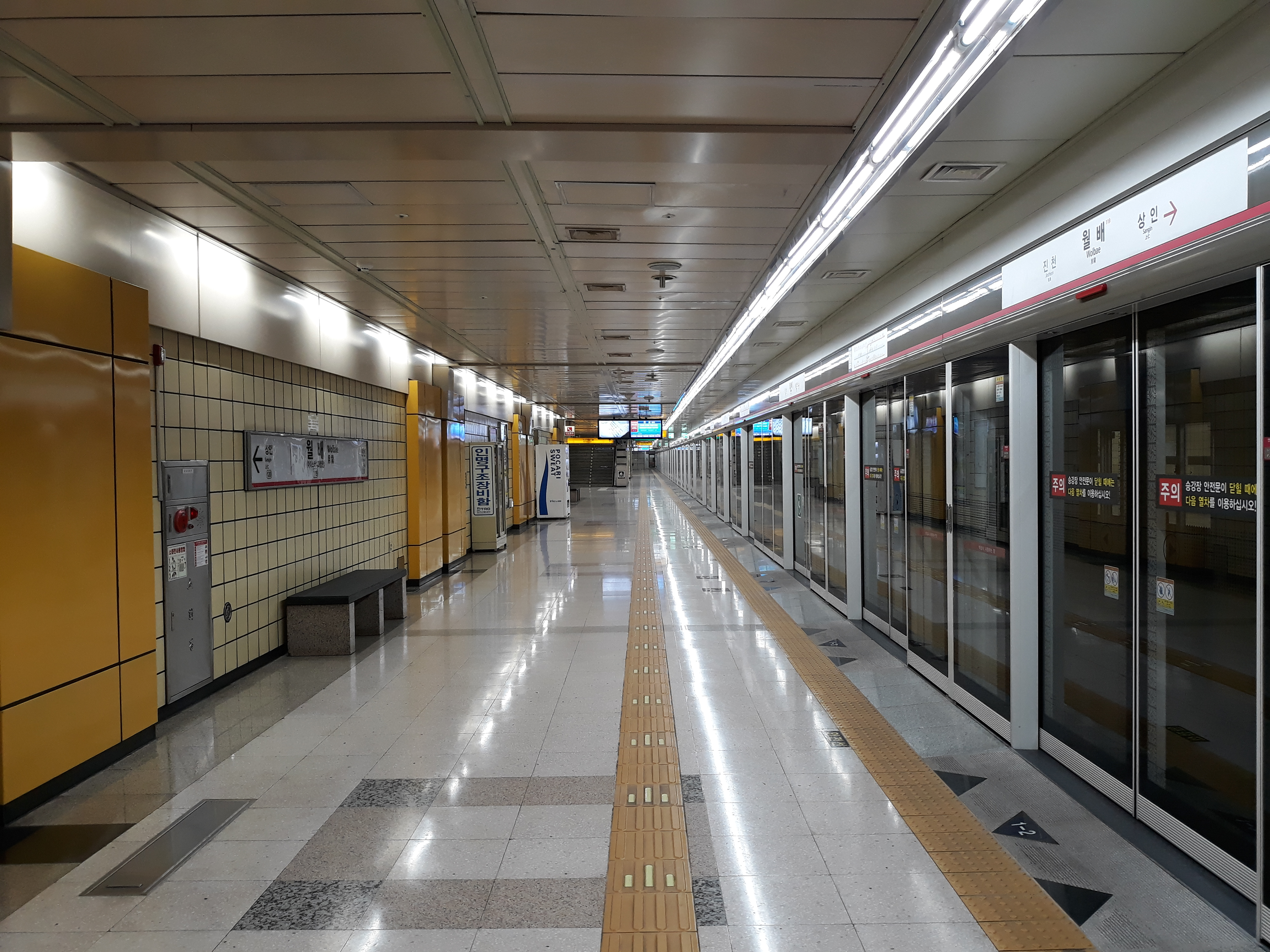
- Station platform

Korean name
- Hangul: 월배역
- Hanja: 月背驛
- Revised Romanization: Wolbaeyeok
- McCune–Reischauer: Wŏlbaeyŏk

General information
- Location: Jincheon-dong, Dalseo District, Daegu; South Korea
- Coordinates: 35°48′59″N 128°31′50″E
- Operator: Daegu Transportation Corporation
- Line: Line 1
- Platforms: 2
- Tracks: 2

Construction
- Structure type: Underground

Other information
- Station code: 119

History
- Opened: November 26, 1997

Services
Preceding station	Daegu Metro	Following station
Jincheon towards Seolhwa–Myeonggok	Line 1	Sangin towards Hayang
Location

Wolbae Station (Korean: 월배역) is an underground station on Line 1 of the Daegu Metro in Daegu, South Korea. It is located in Dalseo-gu, near Daegu Wolbae Elementary School. The station itself is integrated with the Samhyung Medical Center, near exit 3. All four exits are located in the direction of the city. As many residential districts are under development in the surrounding area, the number of passengers using the station is gradually increasing.

There is an escalator at exit 1 and an elevator at exits 3 and 4. This station is the lowest depth of all stations on Daegu Metro Line 1 (13.7m).

== Station layout ==
G	Street Level	Exits
L1	Concourse	Faregates, Ticketing Machines, Station Control
L2; Platforms	Side platform, doors will open on the right
L2; Platforms	Southbound	← Line 1 toward Seolhwa–Myeonggok (Jincheon)
L2; Platforms	Northbound	→ Line 1 toward Hayang (Sangin) →
L2; Platforms	Side platform, doors will open on the right
