= Dalseo District =

District of Daegu, South Korea

Coordinates: 35°49′41″N 128°32′00″E

Dalseo
- Autonomous District
- Panoramic view of Dalseo District

- Flag

- Country: South Korea
- Region: Yeongnam
- Provincial level: Daegu

Government
  - Mayor: Kim Yong-pan (김용판)

Area
  - Total: 62.34 km^{2} (24.07 sq mi)

Population (September 2024)
  - Total: 523,712
  - Density: 8,895/km^{2} (23,040/sq mi)
  - Dialect: Gyeongsang
- Website: Dalseo District Office

Korean name
- Hangul: 달서구
- Hanja: 達西區
- RR: Dalseo-gu
- MR: Talsŏ-gu

Dalseo District (Korean: 달서구) is a district in western Daegu, South Korea. It borders Dalseong County on the north, south, and west, and Seo-gu and Nam District on the east. It has a population of about 520,000, and an area of 62.34 square kilometers. The population rose dramatically in the 1990s, and has been approximately level since 2000.

== Subdivisions ==
Administrative divisions

- Bolli-dong
- Bon-dong
- Dowon-dong
- Duryu-dong (3 administrative dong)
- Gamsam-dong
- Igok-dong (2 administrative dong)
- Janggi-dong
- Jincheon-dong
- Jukjeon-dong
- Sangin-dong (3 administrative dong)
- Seongdang-dong (2 administrative dong)
- Sindang-dong
- Songhyeon-dong (2 administrative dong)
- Wolseong-dong (2 administrative dong)
- Yongsan-dong (2 administrative dong)

== Education ==
- Sangin High School (2001)

== Notable people ==
- Bona, singer (WJSN)
- Frog Boys murder victims
- Kim Dong-han, singer (WEi)
- Son Tae Young, actress
- Song Hye-kyo, actress
- Uhm Ji-won, actress

== See also ==
- Subdivisions of South Korea
