= Gwangajeong =

Traditional house in Yangdong village

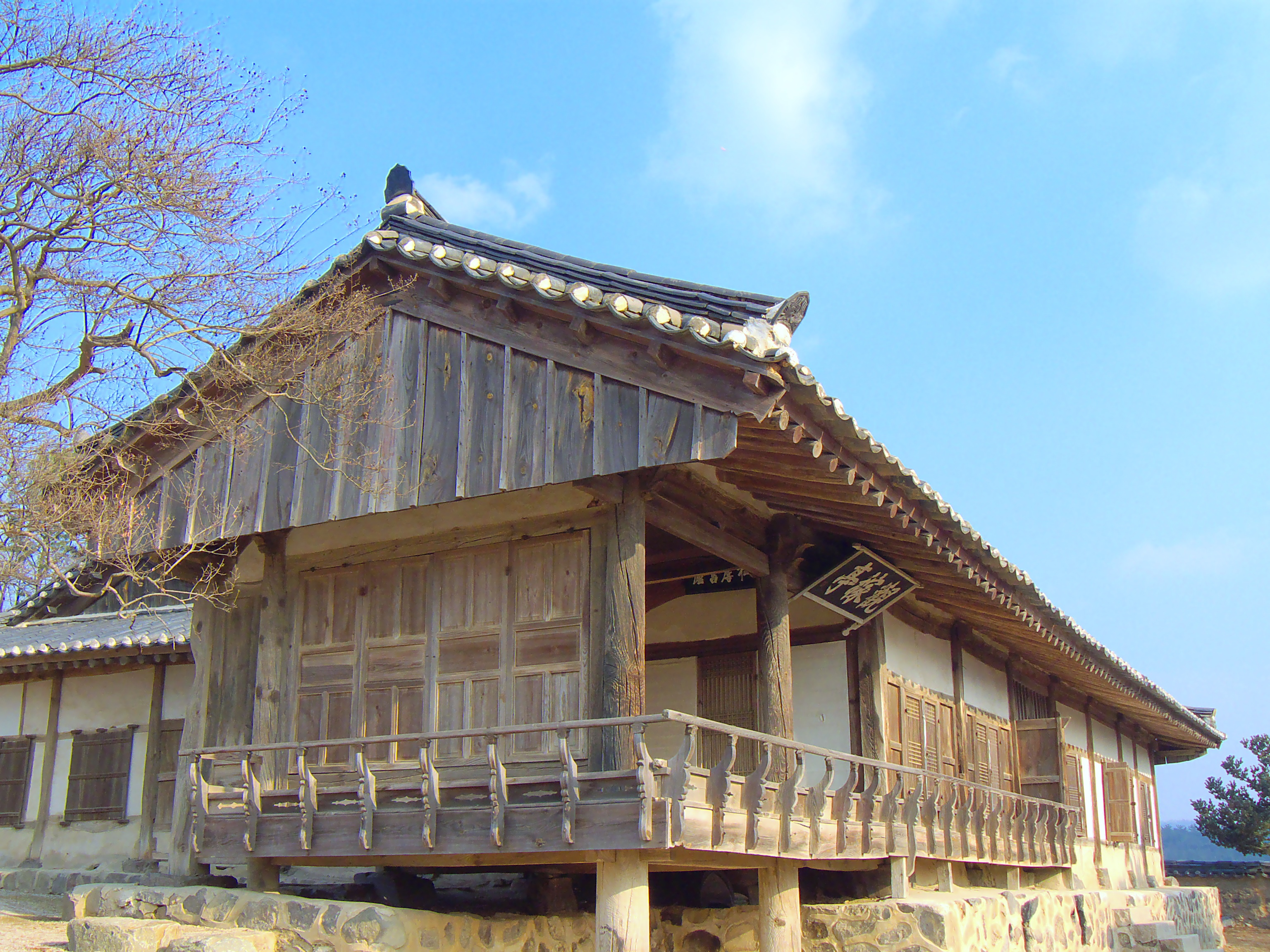
- The building (2008)
- Interactive map of the Gwangajeong area

General information
- Location: Yangdong Folk Village, Gangdong-myeon, Gyeongju, South Korea
- Coordinates: 35°59′59″N 129°15′07″E
- Designations

Treasures of South Korea
- Official name: Gwangajeong House in Yangdong, Gyeongju
- Designated: 1966-04-11

Korean name
- Hangul: 관가정
- Hanja: 觀稼亭
- RR: Gwangajeong
- MR: Kwan'gajŏng

Gwangajeong (Korean: 관가정; Hanja: 觀稼亭) is a historic hanok, or Korean traditional house, in Yangdong Folk Village, Gangdong-myeon, Gyeongju, South Korea. It was the house of Son Chungdon (손중돈; 孫仲暾; 1463–1529), a civil minister during the reign of King Seongjong of the Joseon Dynasty. It is designated as Treasure of South Korea No. 442. The sarangchae (men's quarter) and anchae (women's quarter) of the house are arranged in a rectangular shape looking to the west whereas a shrine is located facing to northeast. The hanok is regarded as a good example for studying houses built in the mid Joseon period.

== See also ==
- Soswaewon
- Gyeongju Hyanggyo
- Oksan Seowon
