= Yi Ch'ae =

Yi Ch'ae may refer to:

- Yi Ch'ae (born 1616), Joseon Confucian writer
- Yi Ch'ae (born 1745), Joseon civil official
