= Silla Arts and Science Museum =

History and science museum in South Korea

Coordinates: 35.8069°N 129.3113°E

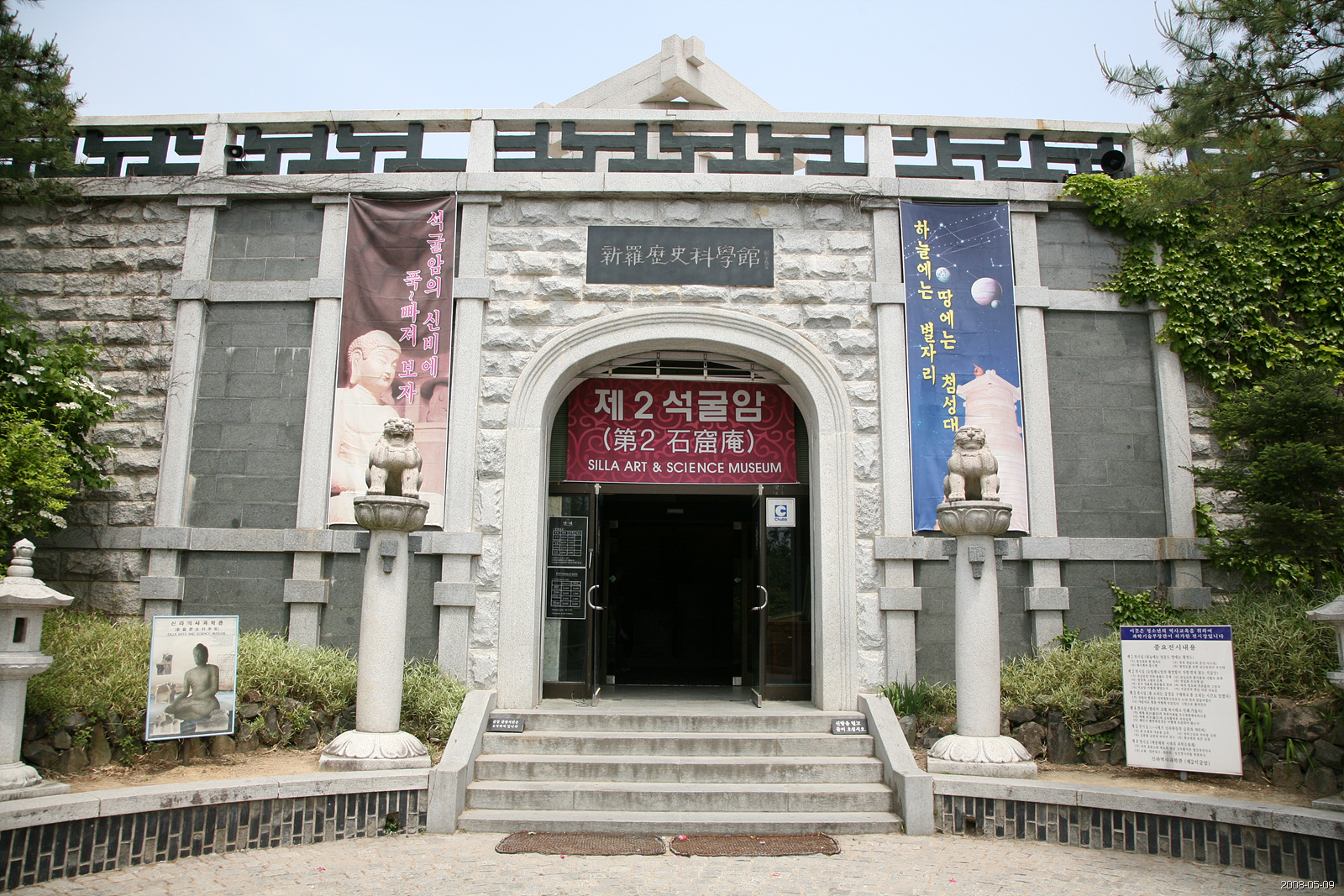
- Entrance of Silla Arts and Science Museum in Gyeongju

Korean name
- Hangul: 신라역사과학관
- Hanja: 新羅歷史科學館
- RR: Silla yeoksa gwahakgwan
- MR: Silla yŏksa kwahakkwan

Silla Arts and Science Museum is a private history and science museum located in the district of Gyeongju Folk Craft Village, Ha-dong, Gyeongju, North Gyeongsang, South Korea. It was established on 15, October, 1988 by Seok U-il (昔宇一) to provide an opportunity that children and youths visiting Gyeongju could know the root of Korean science. The museum in housed in a two-story building with a basement and consists of six exhibition halls according to theme. The first exhibition room located on the first floor presents a total of seven subjects while the second exhibition room located on the basement displays models of Seokguram grotto, one of representative tangible cultural properties of Gyeongju. The third exhibition room on the west part of the second floor exhibits a model of the bronze bell at Sangwonsa temple in the real size and presents information of bell-making process.

== Gallery ==
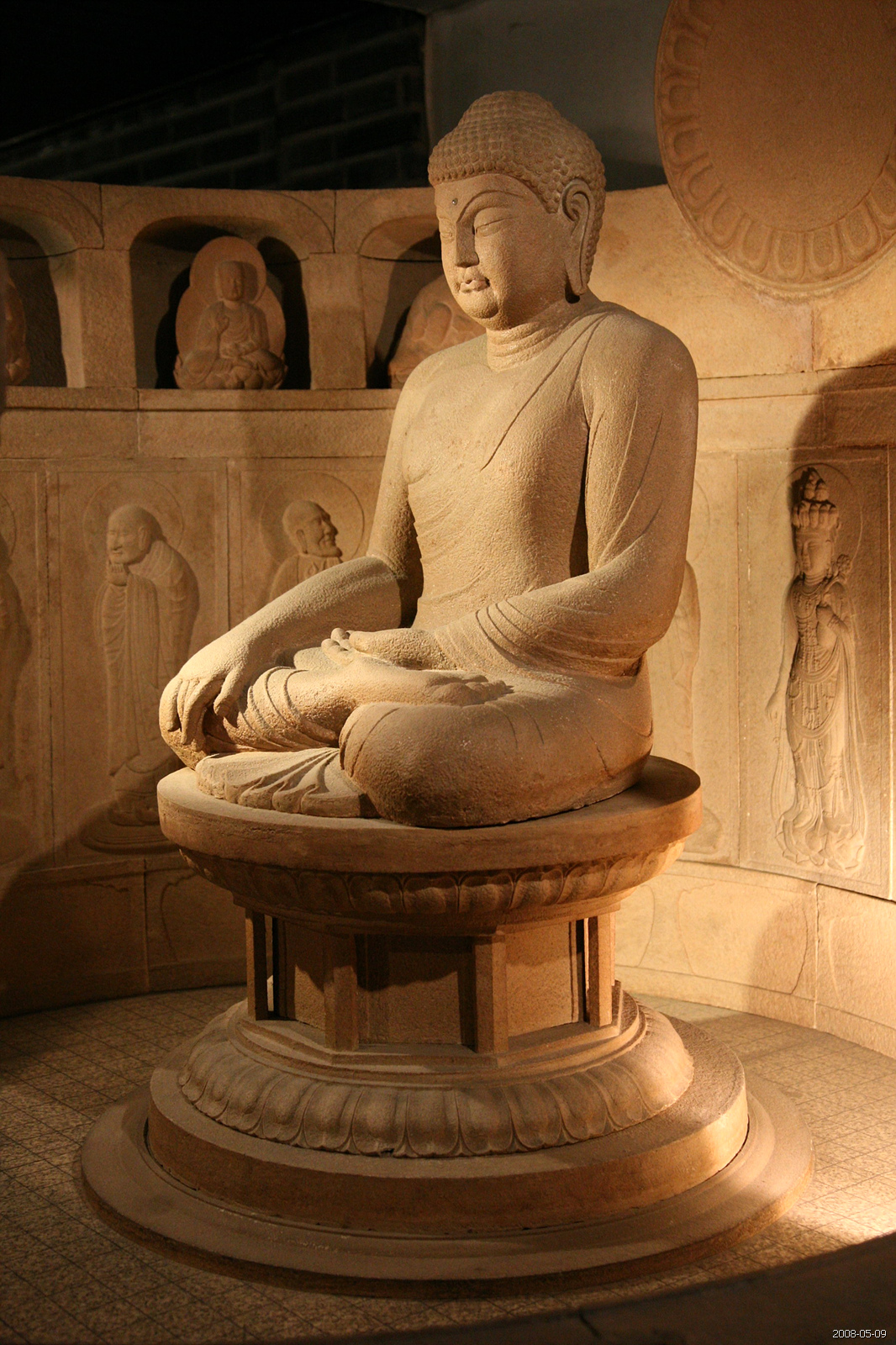

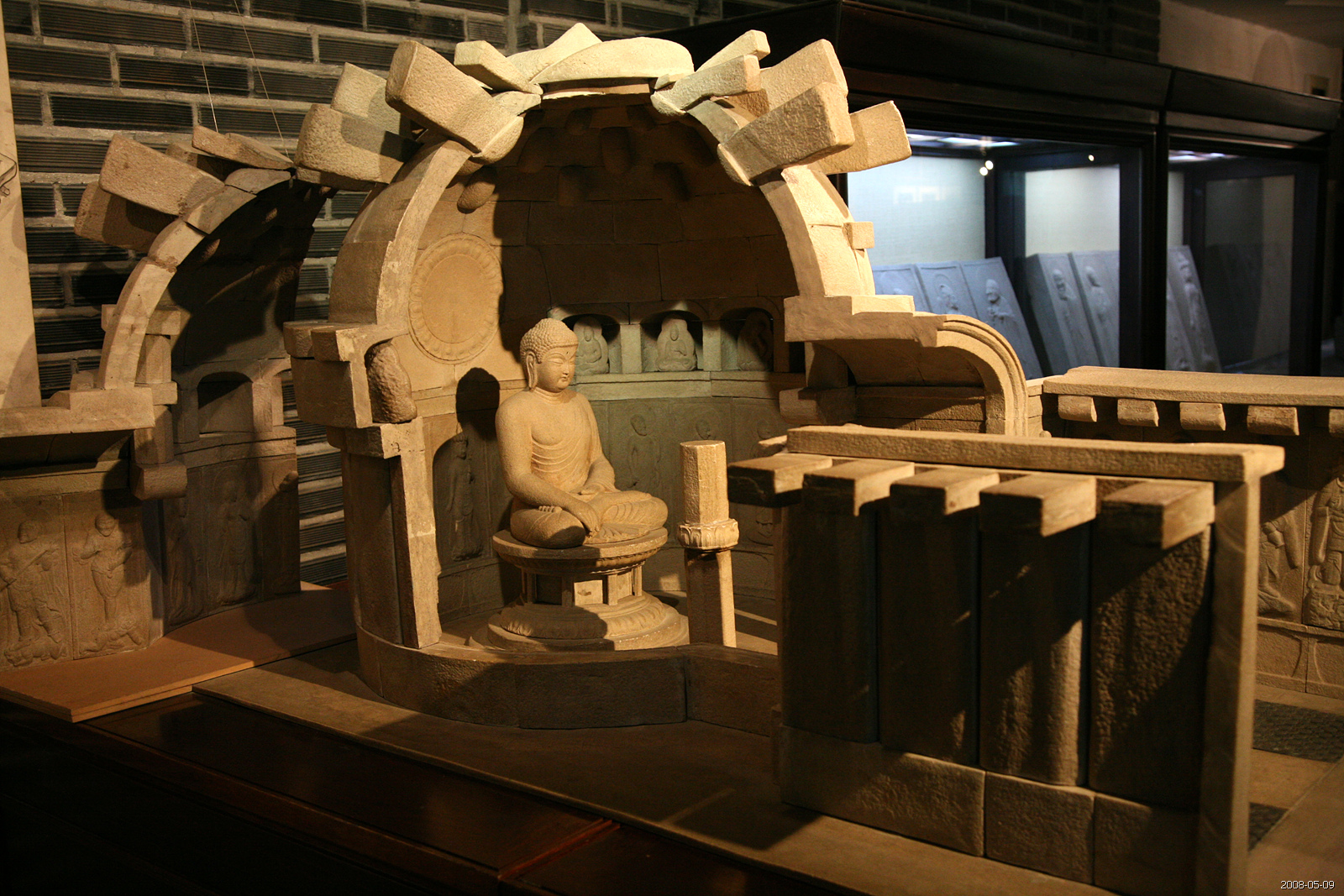

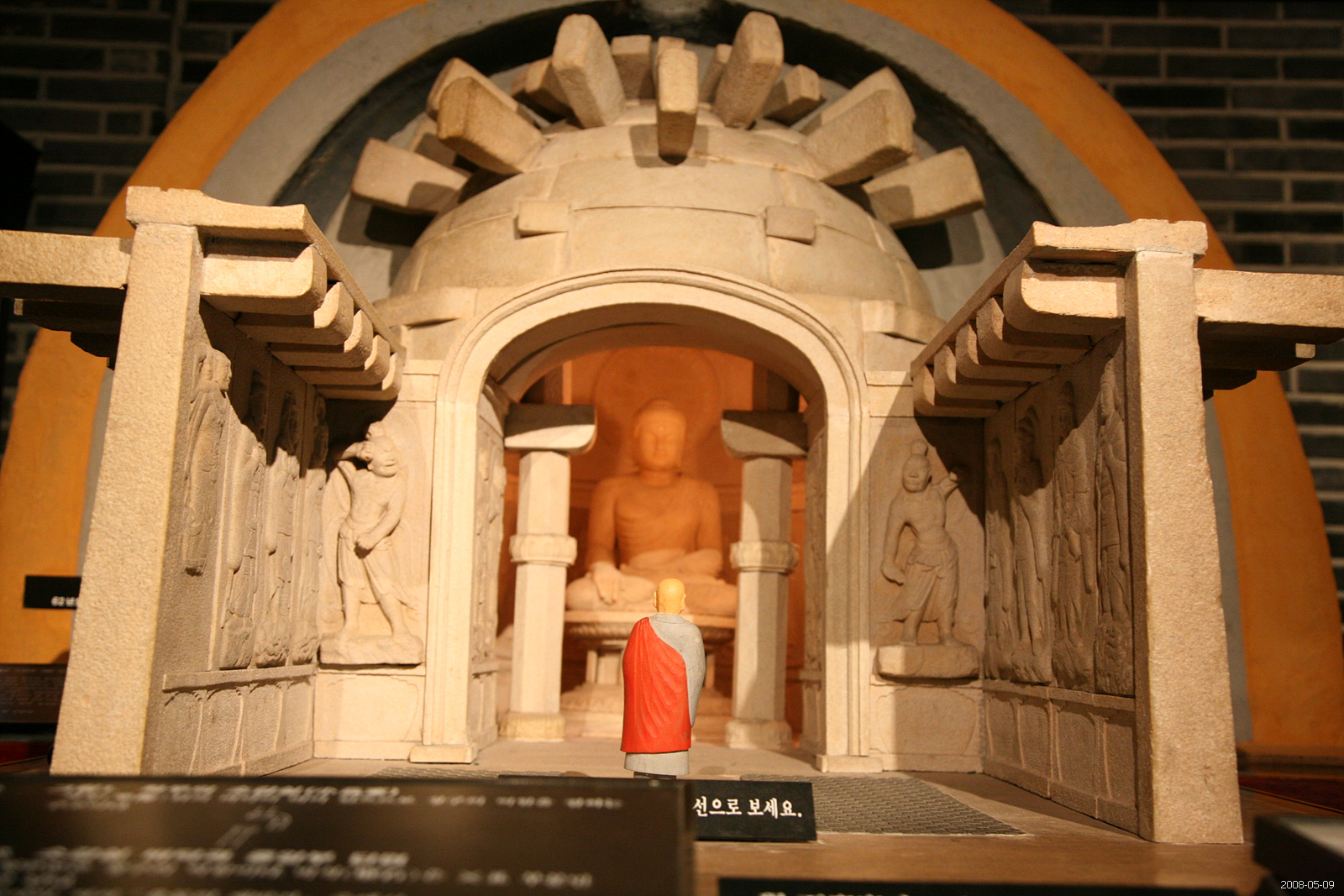

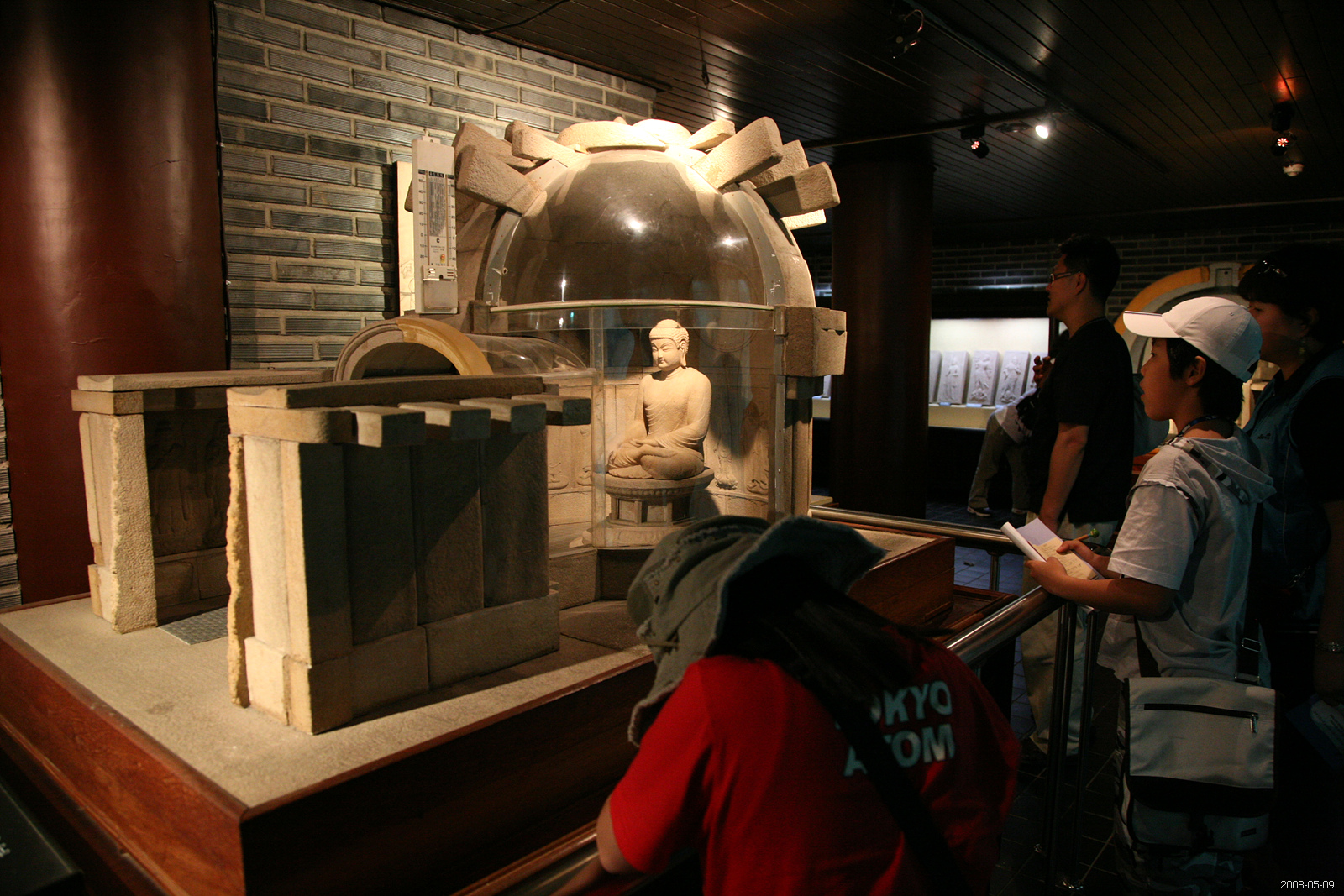

== See also ==
- Gyeongju National Museum
- List of museums in South Korea
