= Gyeongju Folk Craft Village =

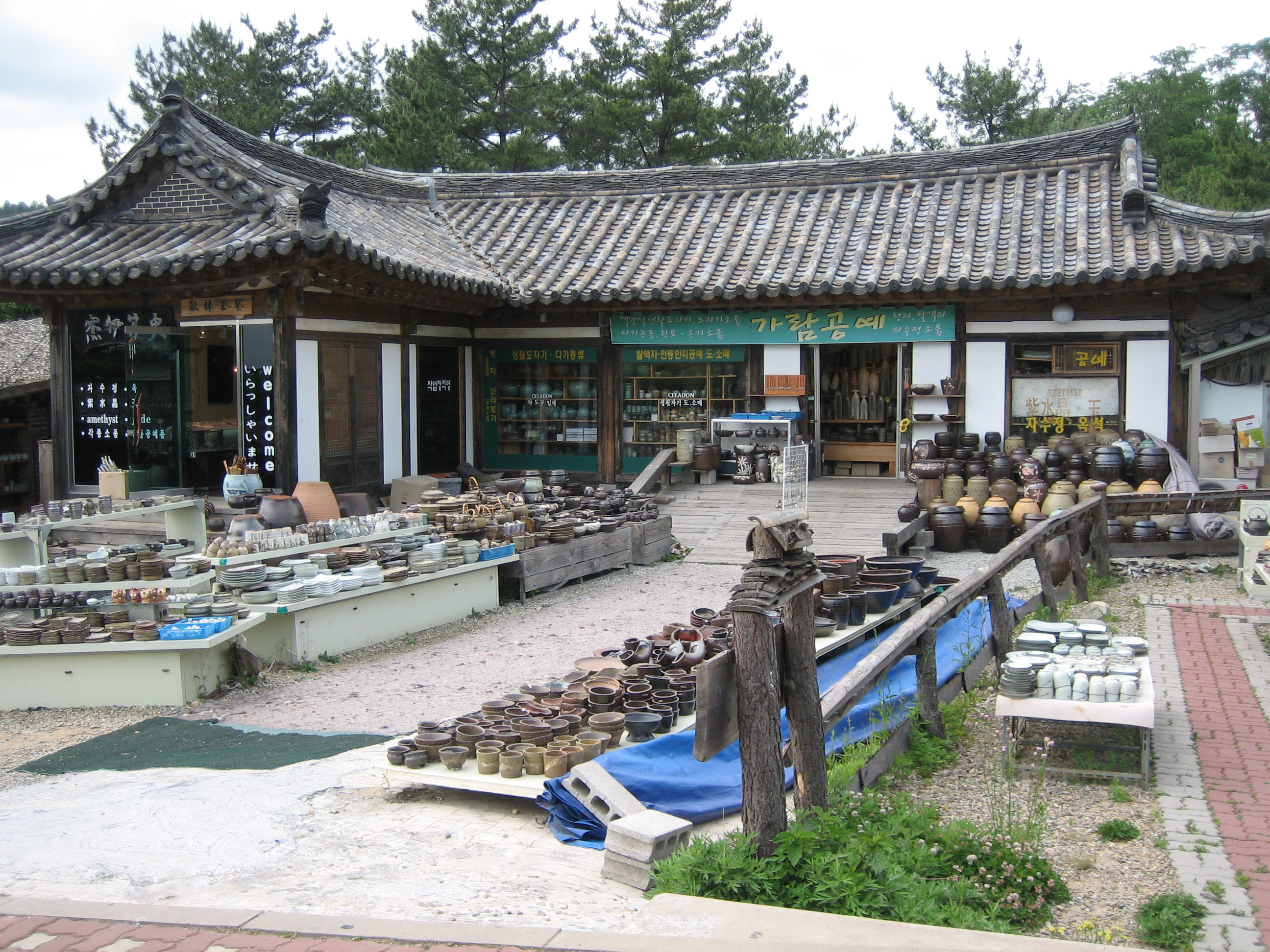
- A hanok-style pottery store at Gyeongju Folk Craft Village

Korean name
- Hangul: 경주 민속공예촌
- Hanja: 慶州民俗工藝村
- RR: Gyeongju minsok gongyechon
- MR: Kyŏngju minsok kongyech'on

The Gyeongju Folk Craft Village (Korean: 경주 민속공예촌) is a village at the foothills of Toman mountain, in the neighborhood of Ha-dong, Gyeongju, North Gyeongsang province, South Korea. The village was established in 1986 to preserve and develop crafts of the Silla kingdom. It consists of hanok or traditional Korean houses including 45 thatched houses (called choga) and roof-titled houses (giwajip) where artisans of the Gyeongju origin live and work.

== Gallery ==
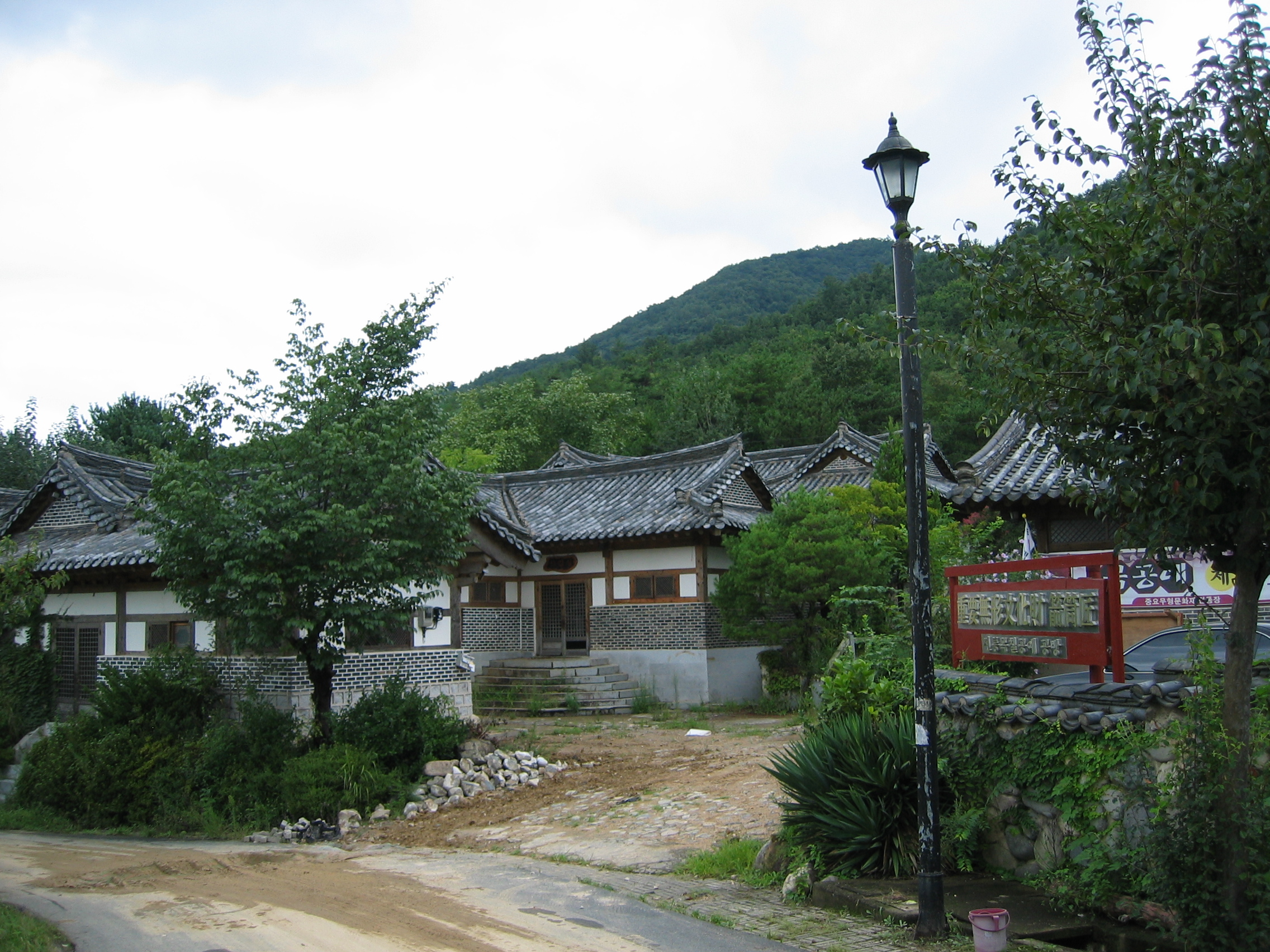

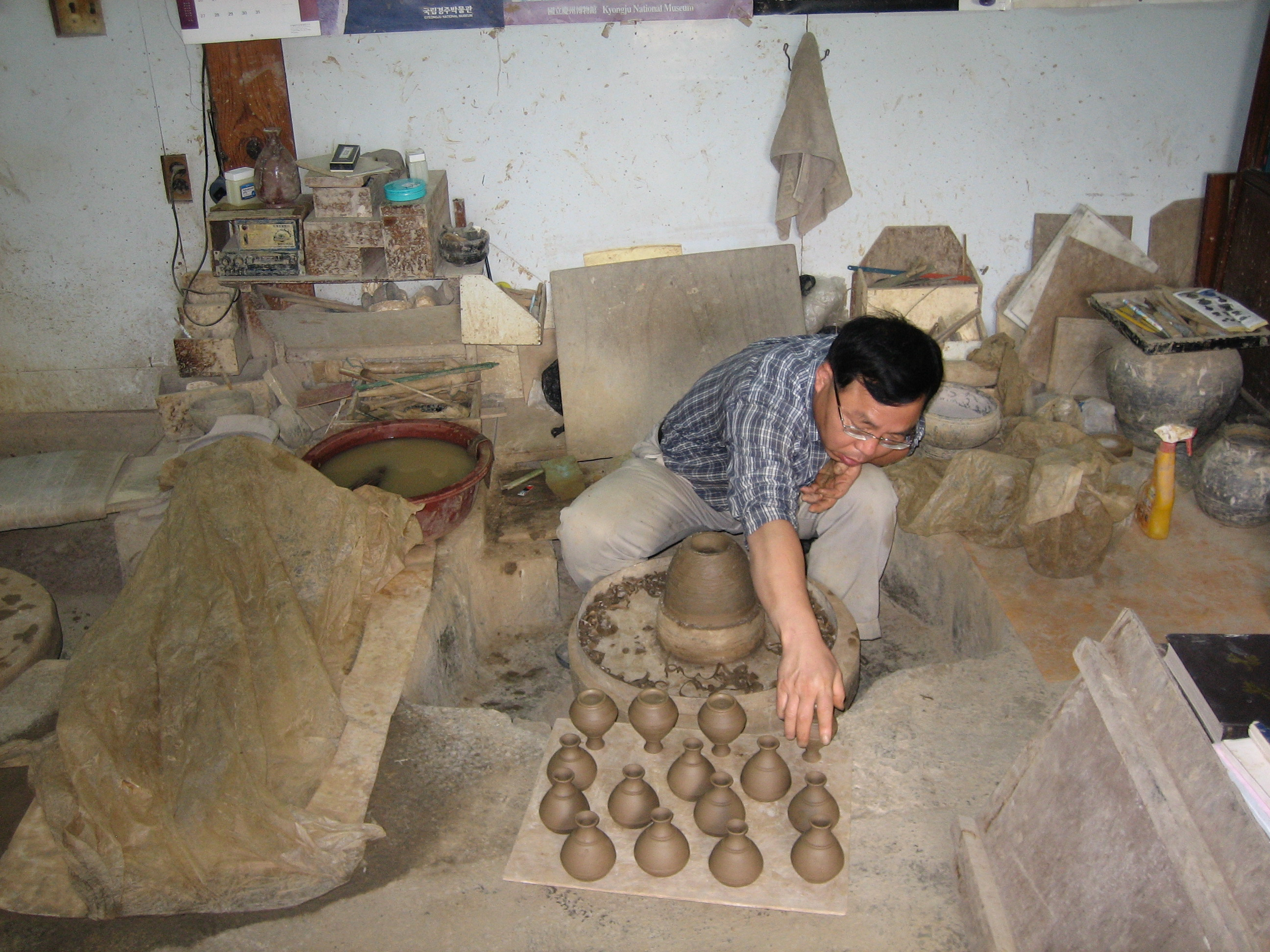

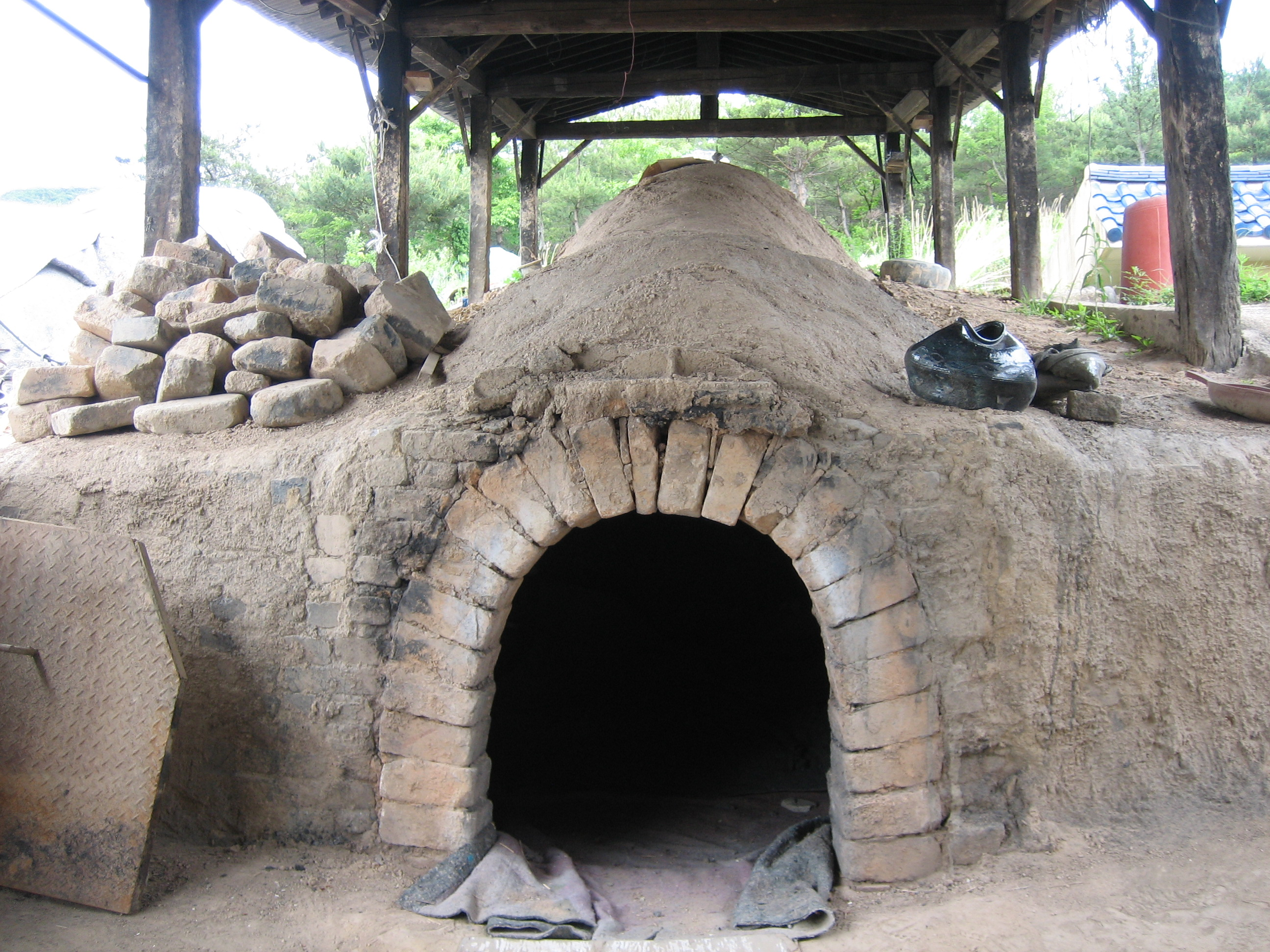

== See also ==
- Yangdong Village of Gyeongju
