= Yi Ch'ae (born 1616) =

Korean scholar-official (1616–1684)

- Hangul: 이채
- Hanja: 李埰
- RR: I Chae
- MR: I Ch'ae

Art name
- Hangul: 몽암
- Hanja: 夢庵
- RR: Mongam
- MR: Mongam

Courtesy name
- Hangul: 석오
- Hanja: 錫吾
- RR: Seoko
- MR: Sŏgo

Yi Ch'ae (Korean: 이채; Hanja: 李埰; 1616 – 1684) was a mid-Joseon Confucian writer, known for compiling the Tonggyŏng chapki with Gyeongju magistrate, Min Chu-myŏn.

== Biography ==
Yi Ch'ae was born in 1616 in Yangdong, Gyeongju, as the son of gentlemen for escort service (종사랑; 從仕郞; chongsarang) Yi Kyo (이교; 李皦), of the Yeoju Yi clan, and his wife, Lady Chŏng, of the Hadong Chŏng clan. His art name was Mongam and his courtesy name was Sŏgo. At the age of 8 or 9, he learned how to write from his grand-uncle, Yi Ŭi-hwal (이의활; 李宜活). In 1631, Chŏn Sik, as magistrate of Gyeongju, met the 15-year-old Yi Ch'ae and was impressed by his scholarly talents, marrying his granddaughter to Yi.

In 1666, Yi Ch'ae would pass the licentiate examinations. In 1669, Yi would compile a local gazetteer, the Tonggyŏng chapki (동경잡기; 東京雜記), or the Miscellaneous Records of the Eastern Capital, with Gyeongju magistrate, Min Chu-myŏn (민주면; 閔周冕). In 1676, Yi Ch'ae was recommended as a person of merit and integrity (유일; 遺逸; yuil) to be appointed to a government post. Yi was given the offices of Yŏngnŭng tomb guardian (영릉참봉; 英陵參奉; Yŏngnŭng ch'ambong) and assistant supervisor at the Ice Storage (빙고별검; 氷庫別檢; pinggo pyŏlgŏm), but declined the posts.

In 1683, Yi fell ill and died the following year in 1684.
