= Gangdong-myeon, Gyeongju =

Gangdong-myeon
- myeon
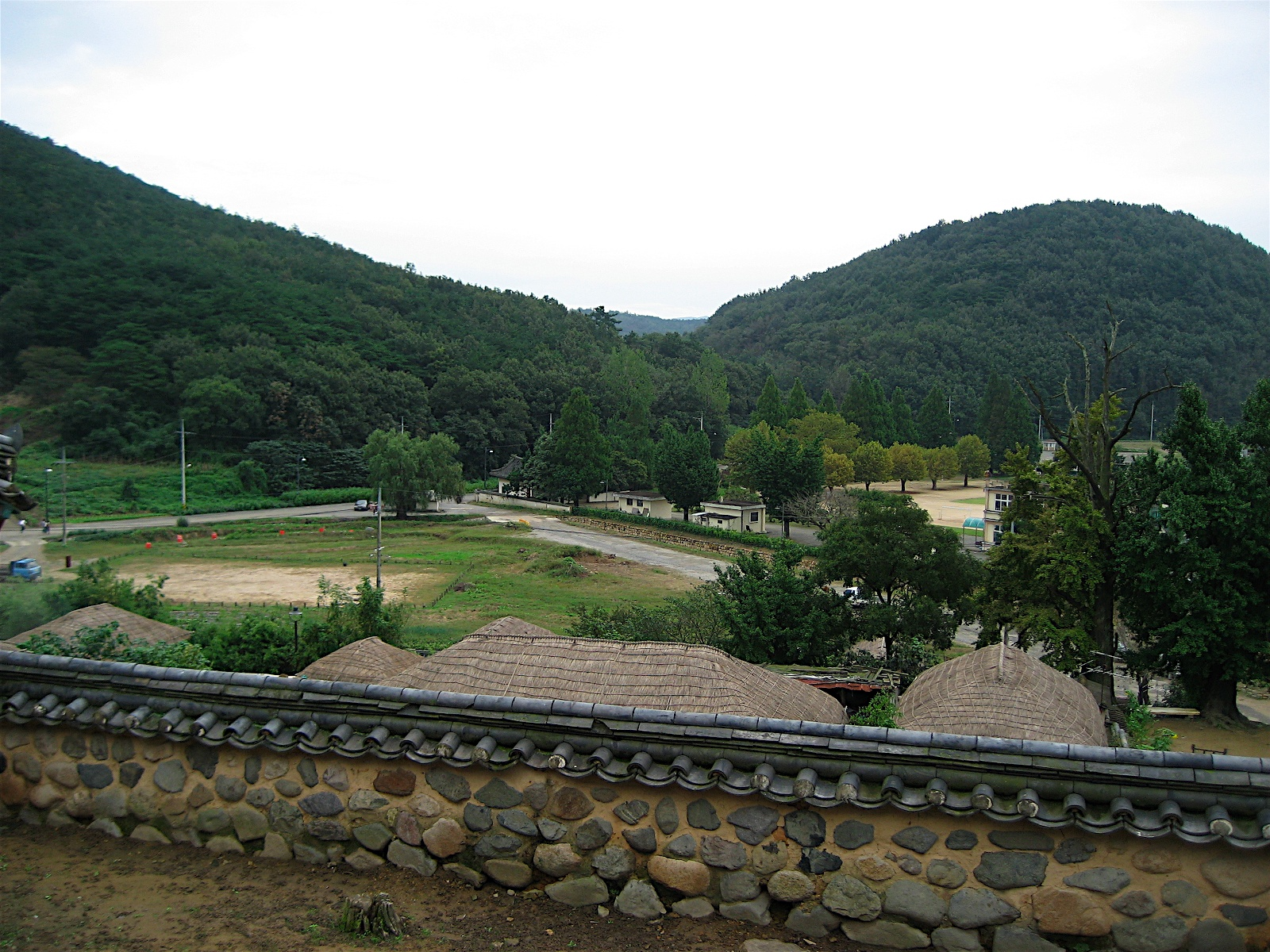
- Yangdong Village of Gyeongju

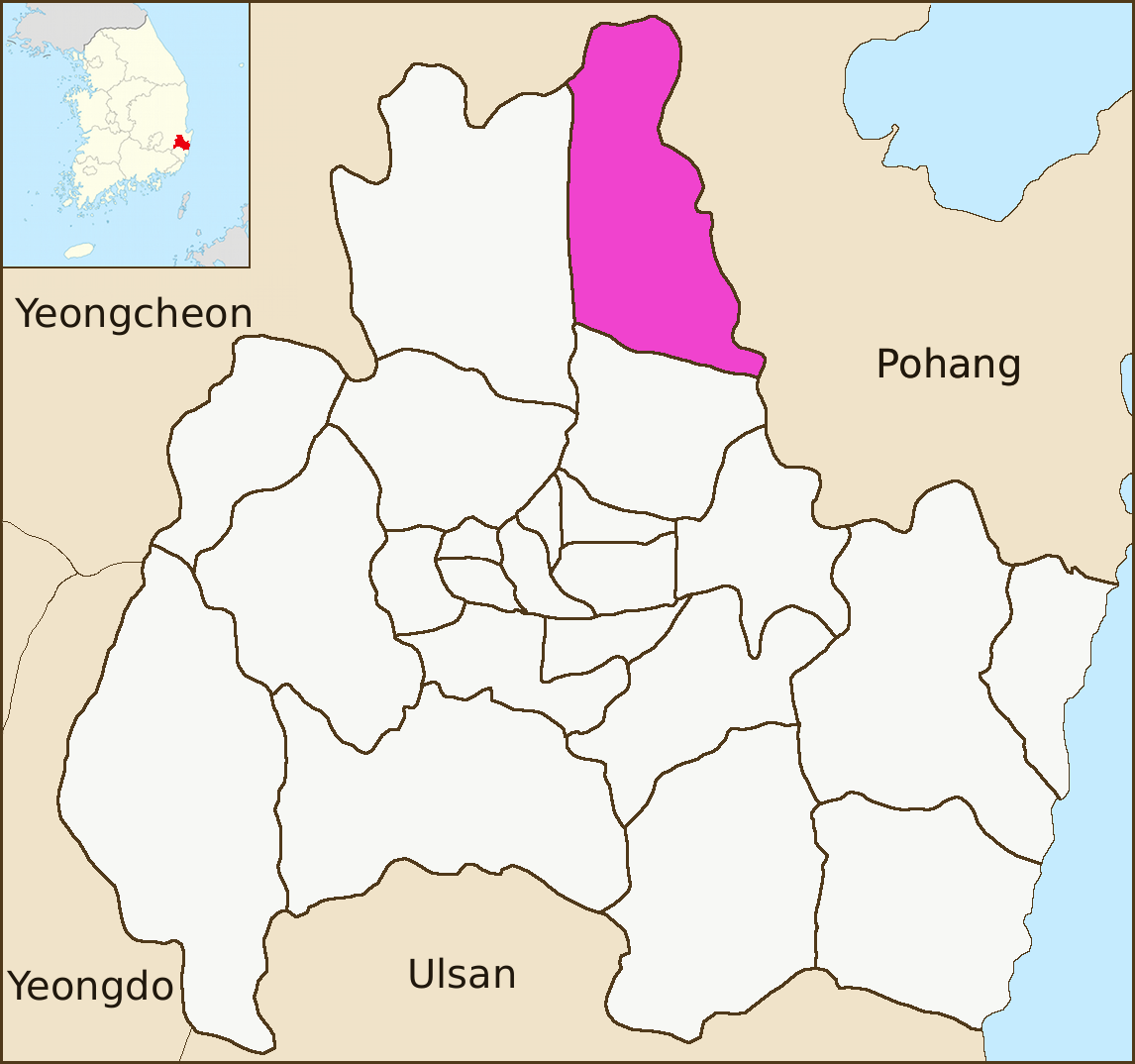
- Country: South Korea
- Administrative divisions: 28 administrative ri (11 legal ri), 90 ban

Government
  - Type: Gyeongju

Area
  - Total: 81.48 km^{2} (31.46 sq mi)

Population (2006)
  - Total: 8,705
  - Density: 107/km^{2} (280/sq mi)
- Dialect: Gyeongsang dialect

Korean name
- Hangul: 강동면
- Hanja: 江東面
- RR: Gangdong-myeon
- MR: Kangdong-myŏn

Gangdong-myeon (Korean: 강동면) is a myeon or a township of Gyeongju in North Gyeongsang Province, South Korea. It is bordered by Pohang on the east and north, Cheonbuk-myeon on the south and Angang-eup on the west. In 2006 its population was 8,705 people, and its area is approximately 81.48 sq kilometers. Its name means "east of the river" although in fact much of it lies north of the Hyeongsan River.

== Subdivisions ==
- Gukdang-ri (국당리)
- Dasan-ri (다산리)
- Dangu-ri (단구리)
- Moseo-ri (모서리)
- Angye-ri (안계리)
- Yangdong-ri (양동리)
- Ogeum-ri (오금리)
- Wangsin-ri (왕신리)
- Yugeum-ri (유금리)
- Indong-ri (인동리)
- Homyeong-ri (호명리)

== Overview ==
The traditional Korean village Yangdong Village of Gyeongju a UNESCO heritage site is located in the Gangdong-myeon. It is a three-minute drive from the village, and is a popular tourist attraction in both the winters and the summers. Gangdong-myeon is essentially a farming village, and the majority of the families have been living there for generations.

It has an elementary school, and church, several restaurants, two banks, a police station, a butcher shop and a railway station (Onjuro station). The village is also full of alley ways between the residences which is a very typical thing in Korean townships. Rear entrances to homes are entered via the alley ways, and they are also the places where everyday interaction between neighbours takes place. There is one main street through the village which runs into a connecting road that leads to Uiduk University.

Highschool and Middle school students go to schools in either Pohang or Gyeongju. Majority of the residents drive to work in either of the cities as well. The village is serviced by buses from both Pohang and Gyeongju, and it is situated on a major highway connecting cities on the east coast of Korea. The Onjuro station is the boarding place and home bound point for a shuttle train service between Pohang, Gyeongju and Daegu. The Samaeul Train connecting Pohang with the rest of the country runs on the same line.

A Dong Ho Chemistry company has the mining rights for Kaolin in the area.

It is a 20-minute walk from the village to Uiduk University on a pathway through rice fields and vegetable gardens, with the stream running parallel with the path floods in the winters. The path is a popular brisk walking place for the village adjumahs (older Korean ladies) in the evenings, as well as short cut for small cars cutting through from the main highway to Samsung Plaza opposite Uiduk University. The railway is part of the scenery, and the frequent passing of the trains whether during the day or the night is a welcome site when there is no one else around.

== See also ==
- Subdivisions of Gyeongju
- Administrative divisions of South Korea
