= Yangdong Folk Village =

Joseon-era village in South Korea

Yangdong Village
UNESCO World Heritage Site
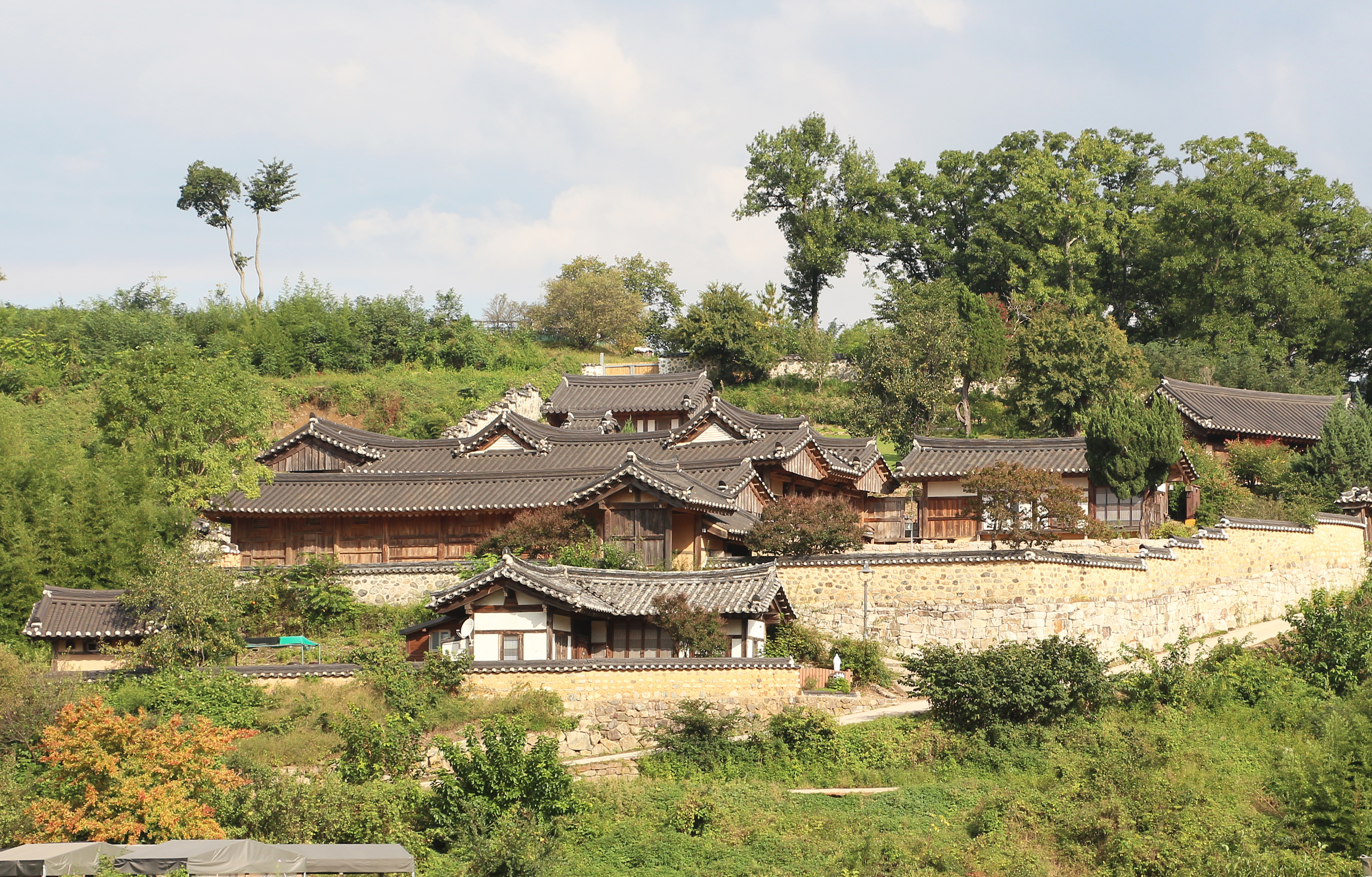
- Yangdong Village

- Location within South Korea
- Location: Gangdong-myeon, North Gyeongsang Province, South Korea
- Part of: Historic Villages of Korea: Hahoe and Yangdong
- Reference: 1324-003
- Inscription: 2010 (34th Session)
- Area: 91.6 ha (226 acres)
- Buffer zone: 237.4 ha (587 acres)
- Coordinates: 36°0′7″N 129°15′12″E

Korean name
- Hangul: 경주 양동마을
- Hanja: 慶州良洞마을
- RR: Gyeongju Yangdong maeul
- MR: Kyŏngju Yangdong maŭl

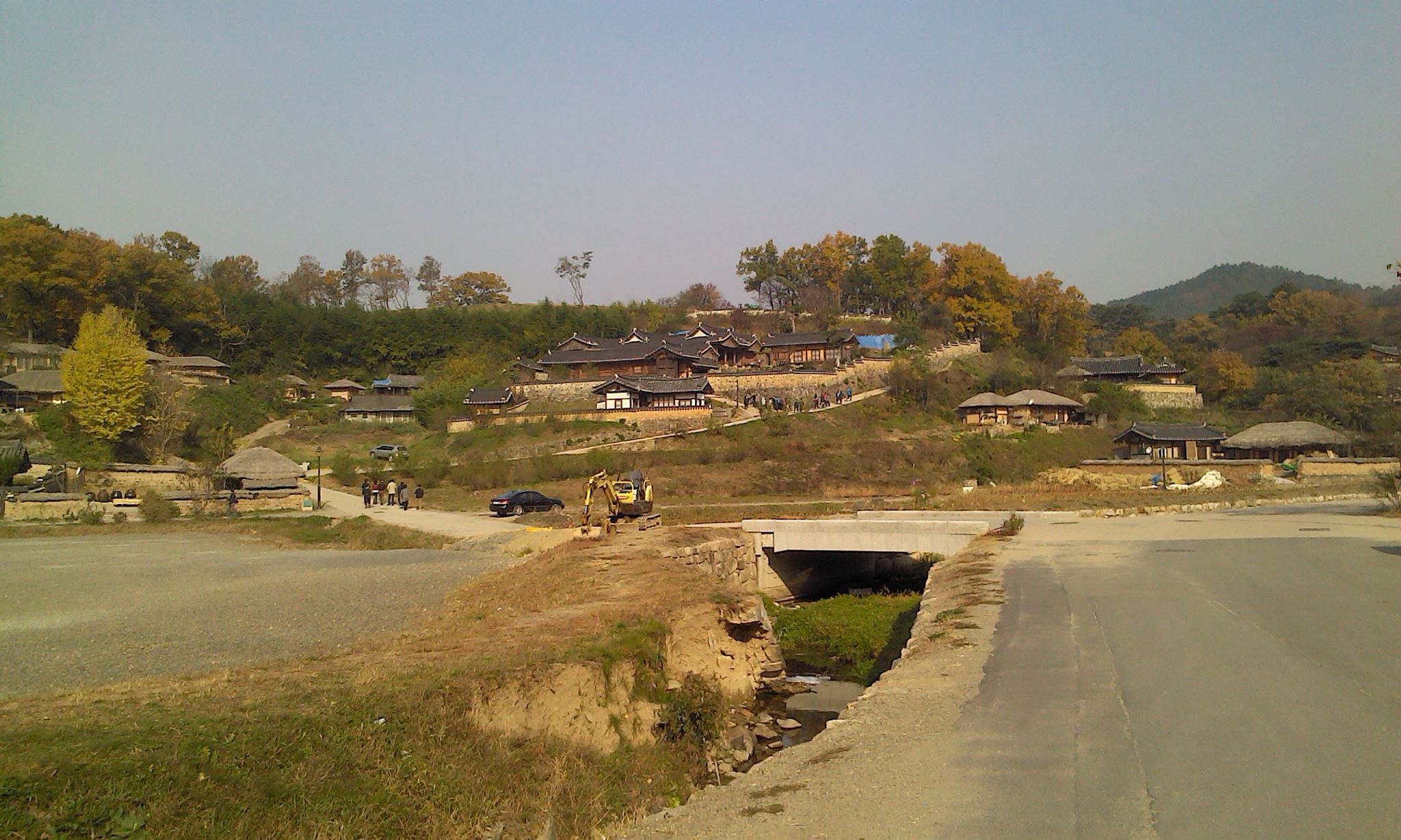
A view at the entrance of the village

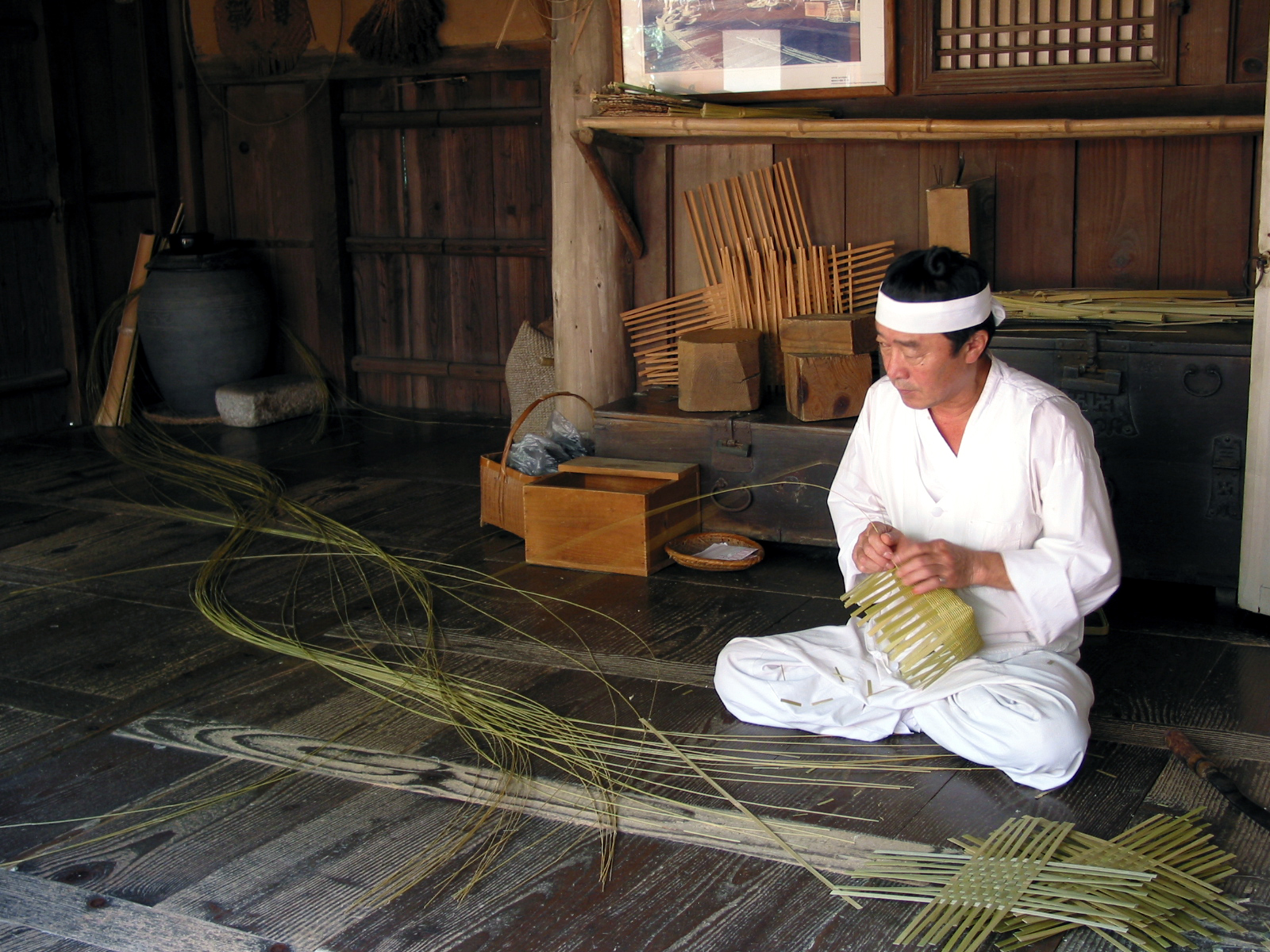
A man in hanbok, traditional Korean costume weaving a basket in Yangdong village

Yangdong Folk Village (Korean: 경주 양동마을) is a traditional yangban (upper class) Korean folk village that dates to the Joseon period. The village is located in Gangdong-myeon, sixteen kilometers northeast of Gyeongju, South Korea, along the Hyeongsan River. Mt. Seolchang stands to the north of the village. The village is designated as Important Folklore Materials No. 189 by the South Korean government.

The size, degree of preservation, numerous cultural assets, traditionalism, beautiful natural setting all contribute to the importance of Yangdong Village. It is also a fine example of the yangban (Korean aristocracy) lifestyle and Neo-Confucian traditions.

The village is listed by the South Korean government with UNESCO as a World Heritage Site with Hahoe Folk Village in 2010.

== Overview ==
The village was founded by Son So (孫昭 1433–1484). The household of the Wolseong Son clan was placed on an auspicious site according to Korean theories of pungsu (geomancy). Son So and his wife, the daughter of Yu Bok Ha had a daughter who married Yi Beon of the Yeogang Yi family. The marriage produced one of the eighteen sages of Korea, Yi Unjeok. The village of Yangdong has continued since its auspicious beginning in the 15th century.

Although some of the village is unoccupied today, overall the village has over 160 tile-roofed and thatched-roof homes built throughout the dense forest. Fifty-four historic homes over 200 years old have also been preserved. The village preserves folk customs as well as traditional buildings of traditional Joseon dynasty architecture. Seobaekodang is the primary home of the Wolseong Son Family. Mucheomdang, is the primary house of the Yeogang Yi family. Hyangdan is National Treasure No. 412. Ihayangjeon and Simsujeong pavilions, and the Ganghakdang village school are also notable structures of the village as well as Gwangajeong and Sonsoyeongjeong. Tonggamsokpyeon, a book printed on movable metal type and National Treasure No. 283, is also located in the village. A picture of the village as you enter it.

Important folk materials at the village include:

- Seobaekdang (No. 23)
- Nakseondang
- Sahodang
- Sangchunheon
- Geunam Manor
- Dugok Manor
- Sujoldang
- Ihyangjeong
- Suunjeong
- Simsujeong
- Allakjeong
- Ganghakdang

Other cultural properties include:

- Jeokgae Gongsin Nonsang Rokgwan (Tangible Cultural Property No. 13)
- Sonso's Will (Tangible Cultural Property No. 14)
- Pine Tree in Yangdong
- Daeseongheon
- Son Jong-ro Jeongchungbigak (Cultural Asset Material No. 261)
- Gyeongsan Seodang (Folk Cultural Asset Material)
- Dugok Yeongdang (Folk Cultural Asset Material).

The village follows the topography of the mountains and valleys and is shaped like an auspicious Hanja character. This arrangement has been carefully preserved. The homes of the Wolseong Son and Yeogang Yi clans, as well as their descendants' homes are located on the high ground of the mountains and valleys. The lower-class homes, characterized by their thatched roofs were built on lower ground. The village's organization highlights the severe social stratification characteristic of Joseon dynasty society. Prince Charles visited Yangdong in 1993.

== Gallery ==
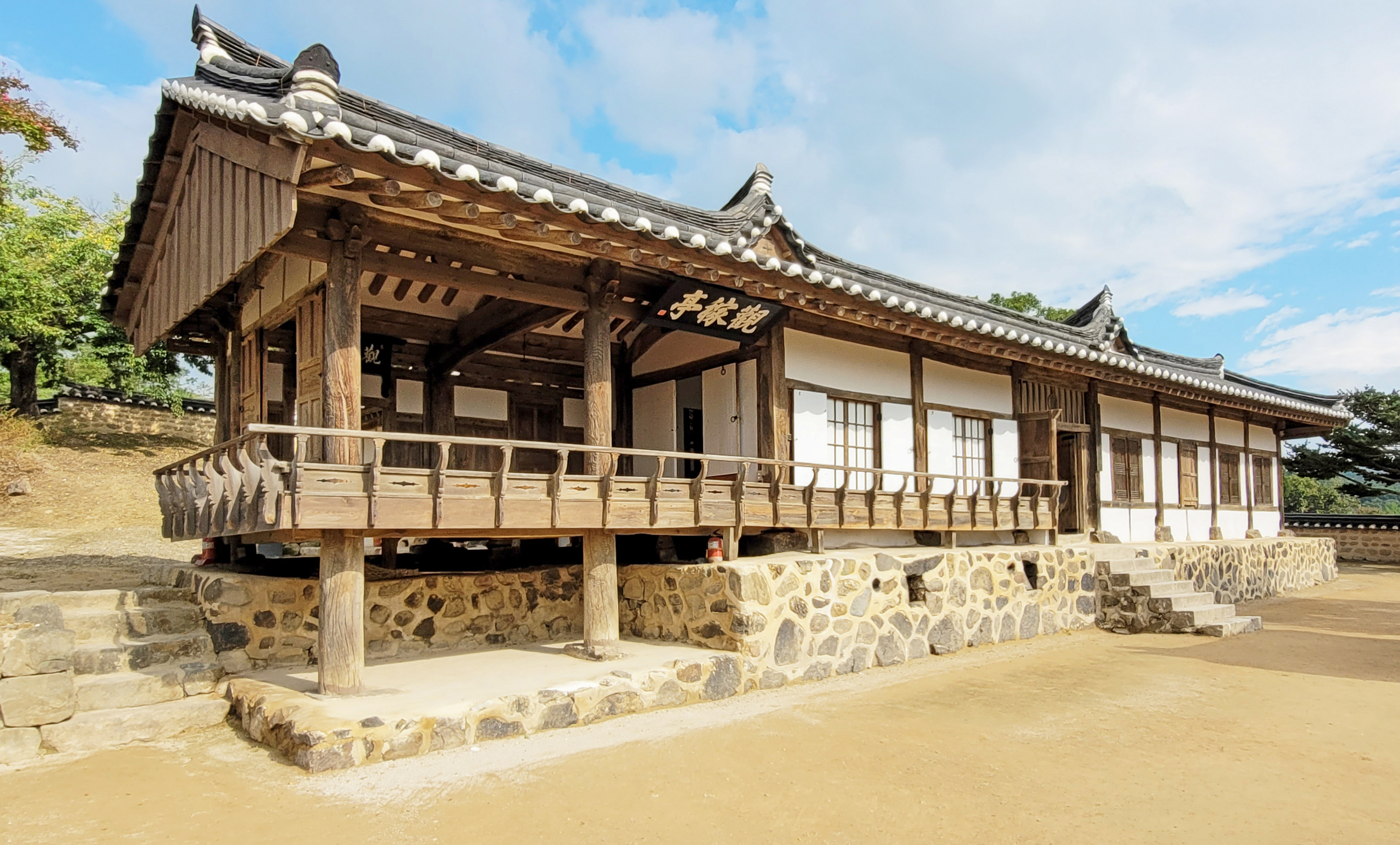
Gwangajeong House

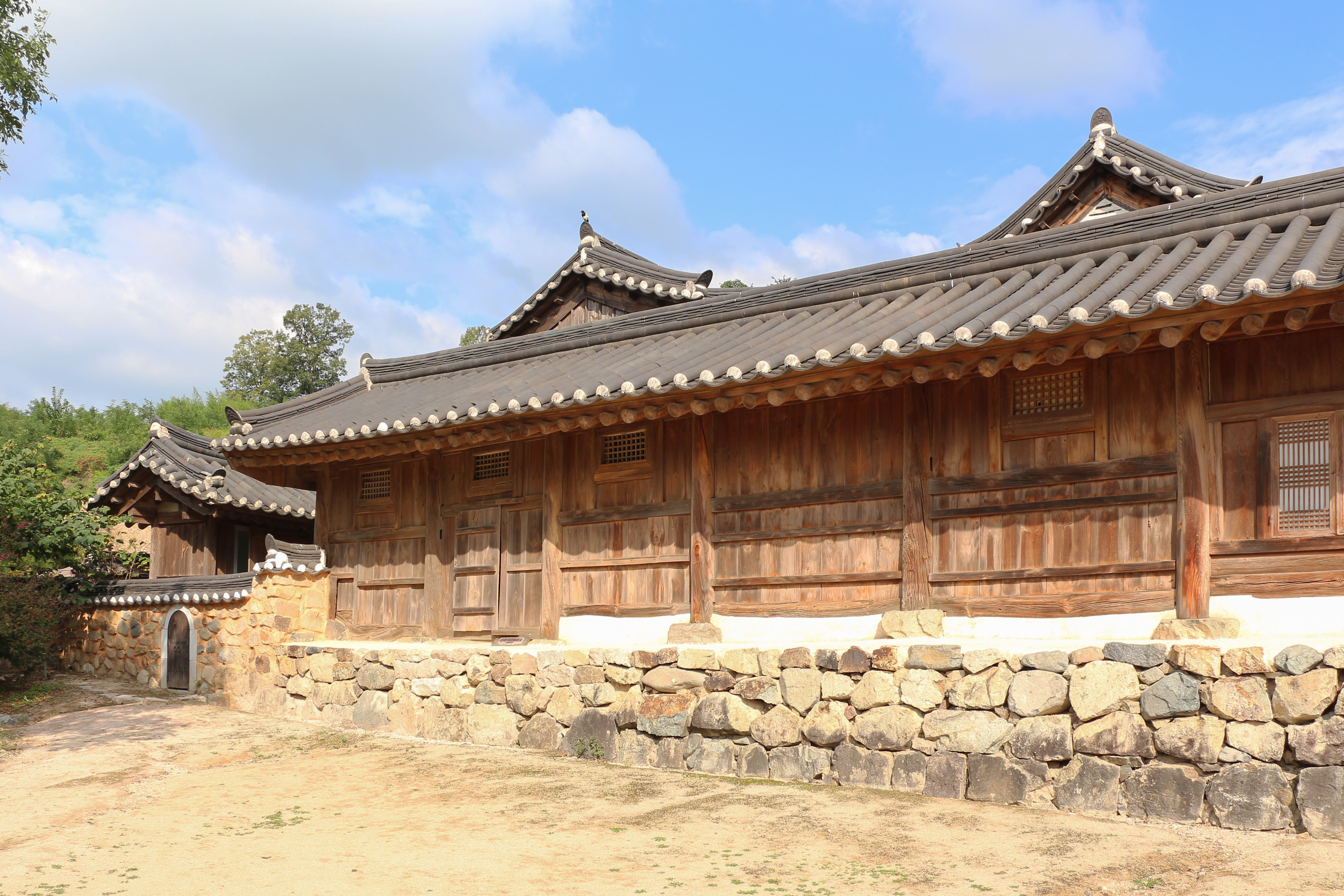
Hyangdan House

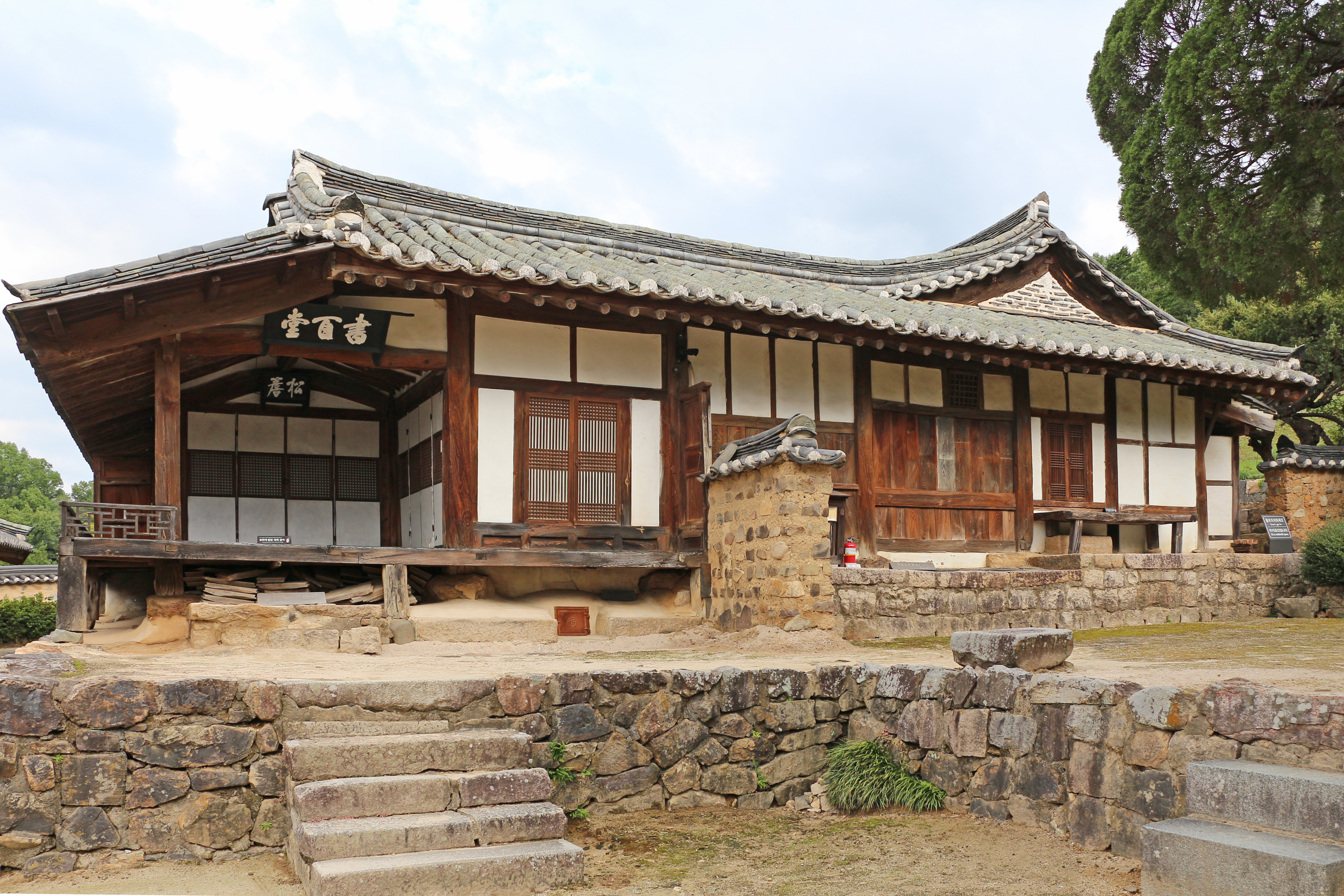
Seobaekdang House

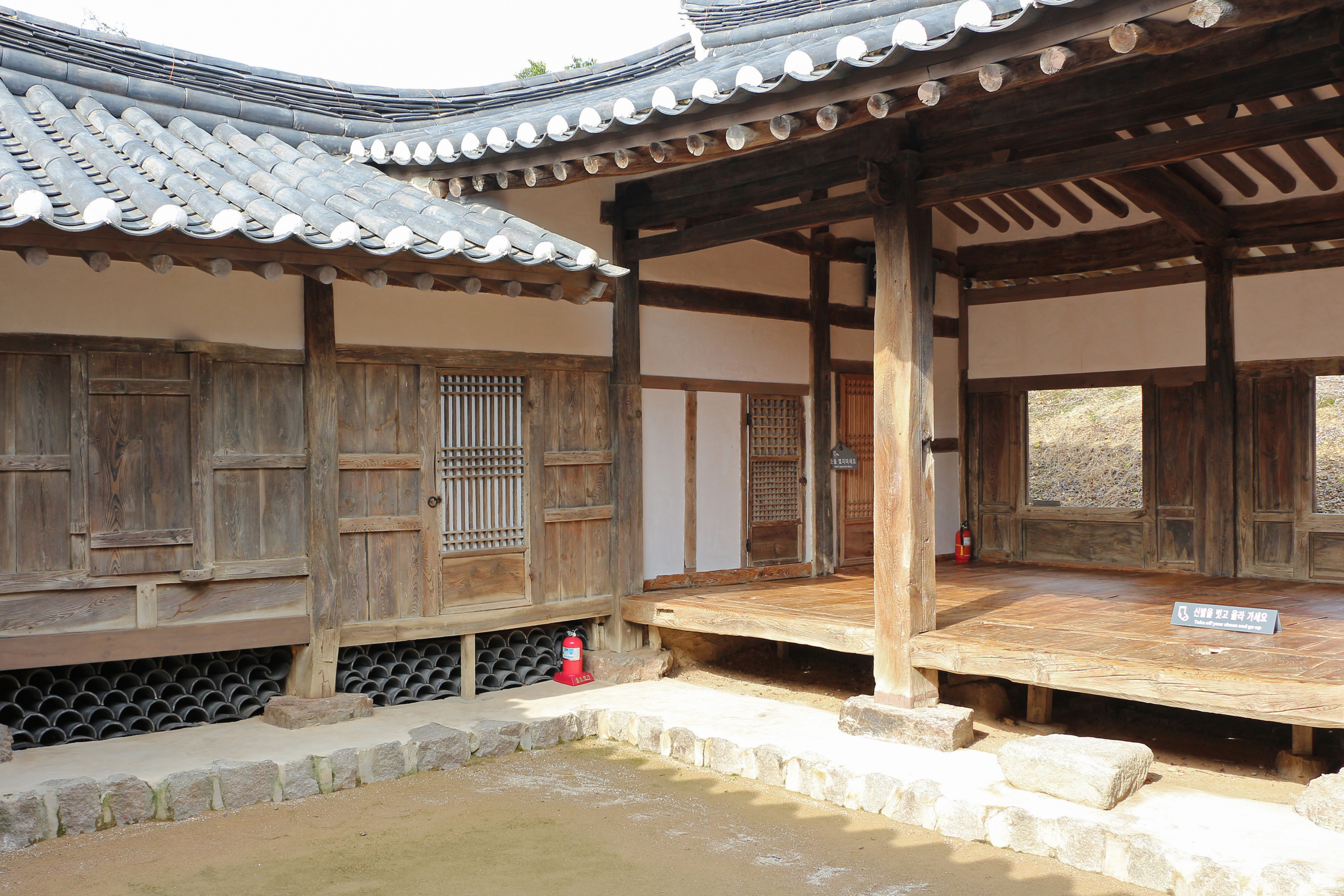
Inside court of a house

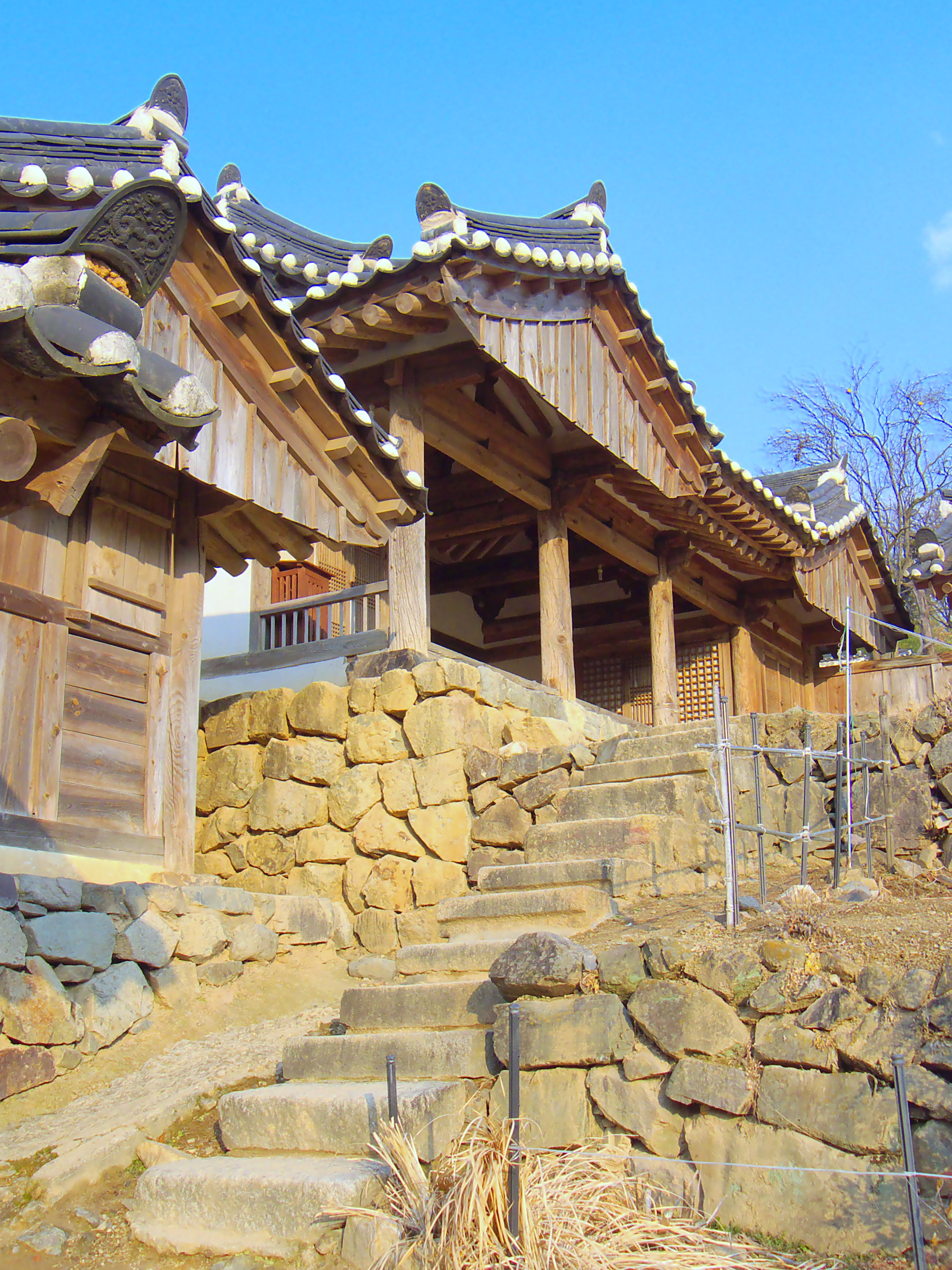

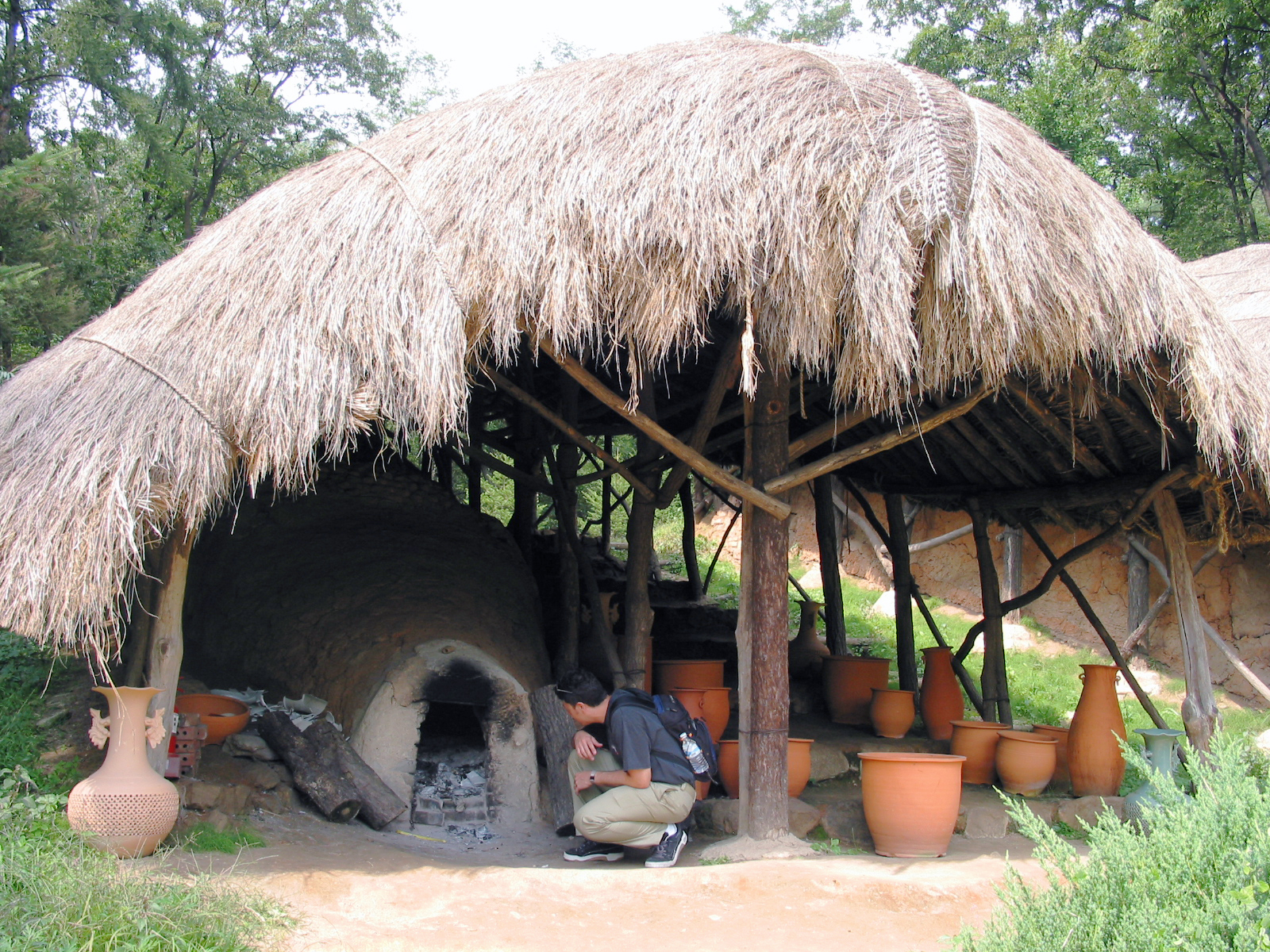

== See also ==
- Hahoe Folk Village
