= Children's World station =

Station of the Daegu Metro

336 어린이세상 Children's World
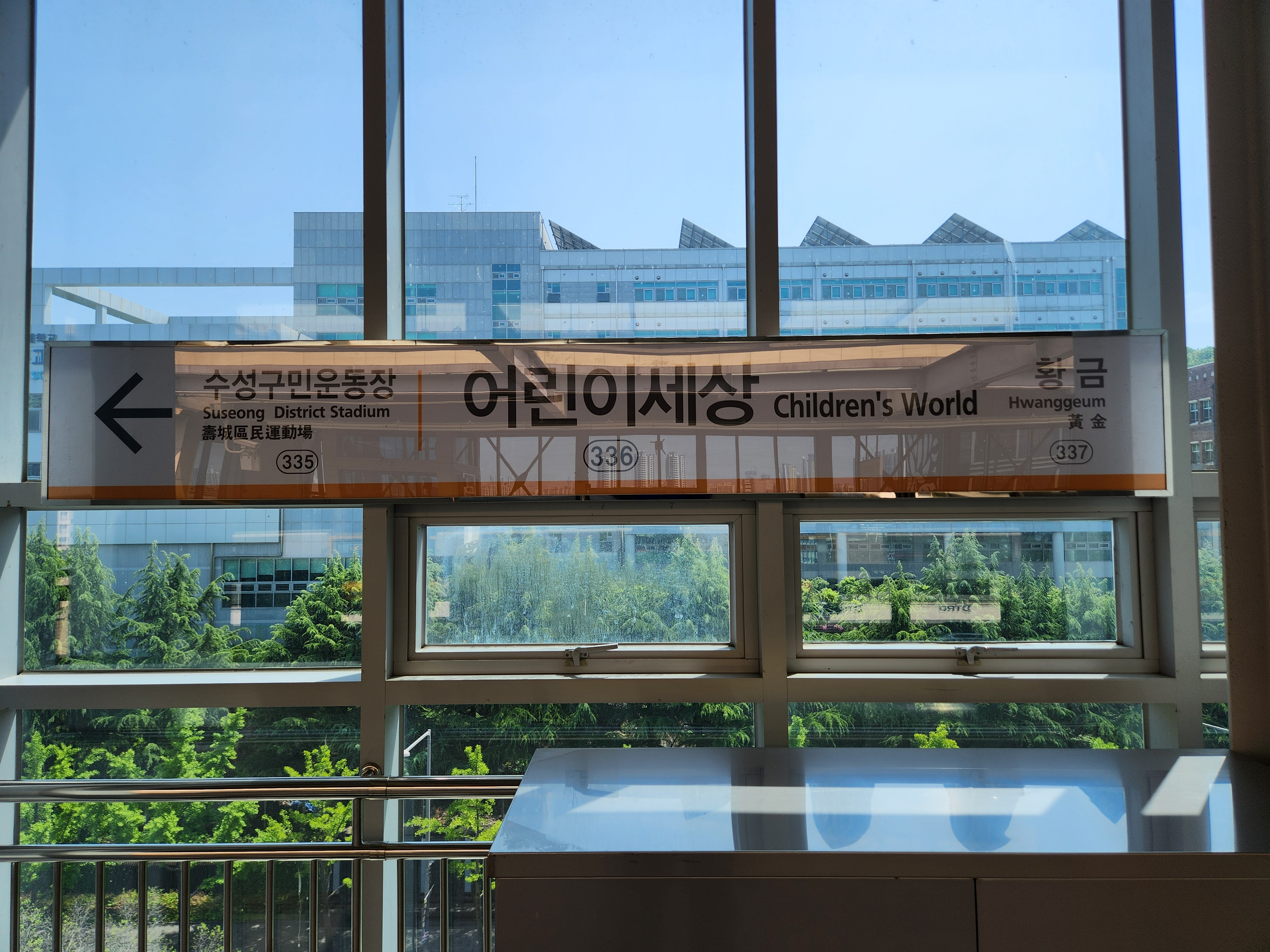

Korean name
- Hangul: 어린이세상역
- Hanja: 어린이世上驛
- Revised Romanization: Eorini sesang yeok
- McCune–Reischauer: Ŏrini sesang yŏk

General information
- Location: Hwanggeum-dong, Suseong District, Daegu; South Korea
- Coordinates: 35°50′42″N 128°37′28″E
- Operator: DTRO
- Platforms: 2
- Tracks: 2

Construction
- Structure type: Overground

Other information
- Station code: 336

History
- Opened: April 23, 2015

Services
Preceding station	Daegu Metro	Following station
Suseong District Stadium towards Chilgok Kyungpook National University Medical Center	Line 3	Hwanggeum towards Yongji
Location

Children's World Station (Korean: 어린이세상역), formerly Children's Hall station, is a station of the Daegu Metro Line 3 in Hwanggeum-dong, Suseong District, Daegu, South Korea.

Suseong District Office, the administrative institution responsible for governing Suseong District, is currently located near Suseong-gu Office Station of the Daegu Metro Line 2 as of 2025. However, after relocating to its new building, which is set to be completed in 2029, it will be closer to Children's World Station.
