= Suseong Market station =

Station of the Daegu Metro

334 수성시장 Suseong Market
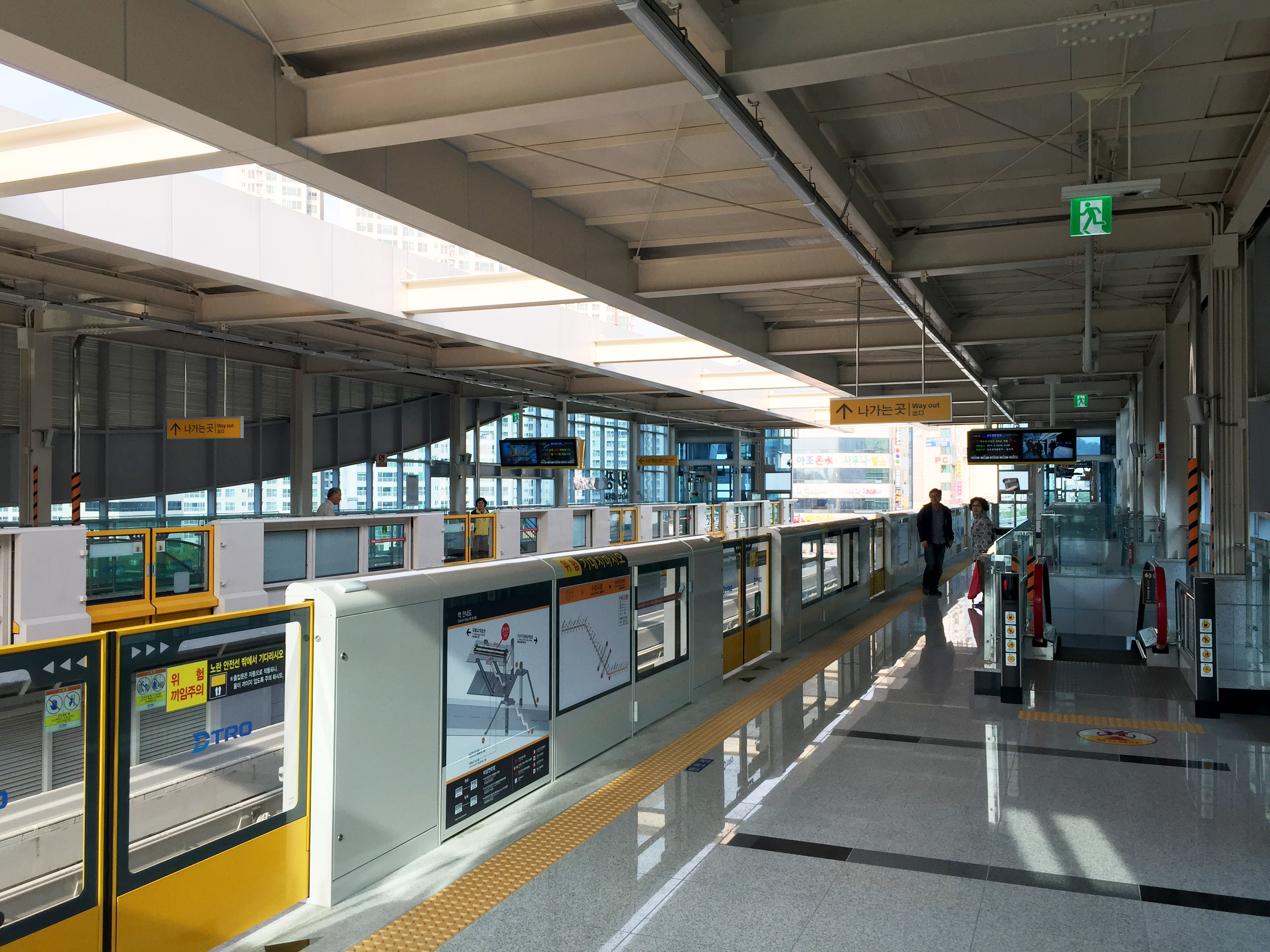
- The station platform in April 2015

Korean name
- Hangul: 수성시장역
- Hanja: 壽城市場驛
- Revised Romanization: Suseong sijang yeok
- McCune–Reischauer: Susŏng sijang yŏk

General information
- Location: Suseong-dong, Suseong District, Daegu; South Korea
- Coordinates: 35°51′15″N 128°36′58″E
- Operator: DTRO
- Line: Daegu Metro Line 3
- Platforms: 2
- Tracks: 2

Construction
- Structure type: Overground

Other information
- Station code: 334

History
- Opened: April 23, 2015

Services
Preceding station	Daegu Metro	Following station
Daebonggyo towards Chilgok Kyungpook National University Medical Center	Line 3	Suseong District Stadium towards Yongji
Location

Suseong Market Station is a station of the Daegu Metro Line 3 in Suseong-dong, Suseong District, Daegu, South Korea.

== History ==
Suseong Market Station is a station on Metro Line 3 opened on April 23, 2015. It is owned and operated by the Daegu Transportation Corporation, which is responsible for maintaining the three metro lines within the city.

== Design and Function ==
It is a monorail line located above street level, accessible through a stairway and elevators with two platforms. It is located close to Daegu Office of Education.
