= Manpyeong station =

Station of the Daegu Metro

323 만평 Manpyeong
- The tracks entering the facade of Manpyeong Station in 2016

Korean name
- Hangul: 만평역
- Hanja: 萬坪驛
- Revised Romanization: Manpyeong yeok
- McCune–Reischauer: Manp'yŏng yŏk

General information
- Location: Bisan-dong, Seo District, Daegu; South Korea
- Coordinates: 35°53′23″N 128°33′40″E
- Operator: DTRO
- Line: Daegu Metro Line 3
- Platforms: 2
- Tracks: 2

Construction
- Structure type: Overground

Other information
- Station code: 323

History
- Opened: April 23, 2015
Location

Manpyeong Station is a station of Daegu Metro Line 3 in Bisan-dong, Seo District, Daegu, South Korea.

Preceding station	Daegu Metro	Following station
Gongdan towards Chilgok Kyungpook National University Medical Center	Line 3	Paldal Market towards Yongji
