= Suseongmot station =

Station of the Daegu Metro

338 수성못 (TBC) Suseongmot (TBC)
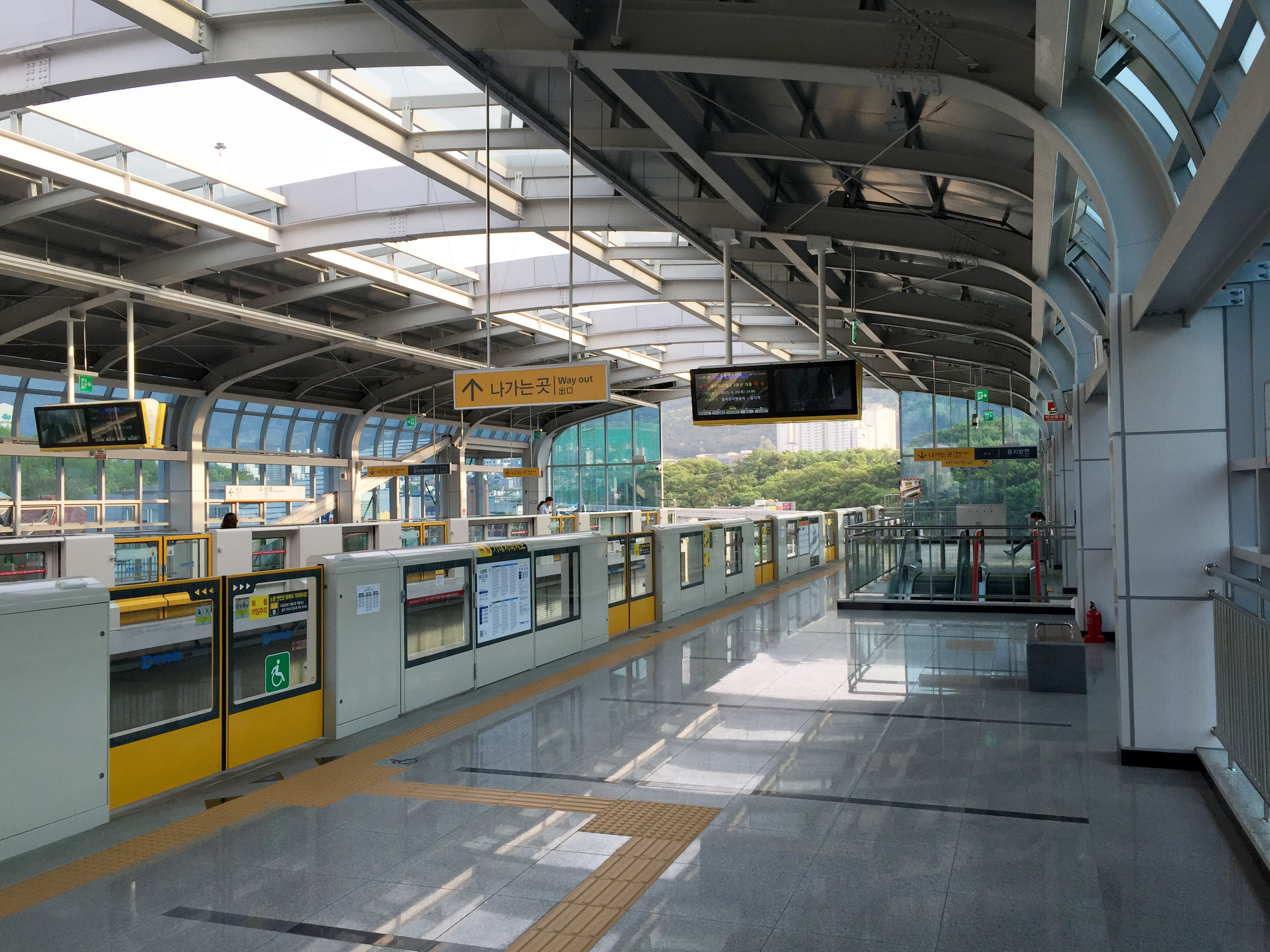
- The station platform in April 2015

Korean name
- Hangul: 수성못역
- Revised Romanization: Suseongmot yeok
- McCune–Reischauer: Susŏngmot yŏk

General information
- Location: Jisan-dong, Suseong District, Daegu; South Korea
- Coordinates: 35°49′53″N 128°37′24″E
- Operator: DTRO
- Line: Daegu Metro Line 3
- Platforms: 2
- Tracks: 2

Construction
- Structure type: Overground

Other information
- Station code: 338

History
- Opened: April 23, 2015

Services
Preceding station	Daegu Metro	Following station
Hwanggeum towards Chilgok Kyungpook National University Medical Center	Line 3	Jisan towards Yongji
Location

Suseongmot station is a station of the Daegu Metro Line 3 in Jisan-dong, Suseong District, Daegu, South Korea.
