= Gongdan station =

Railway station in Daegu, South Korea

322 공단 Gongdan
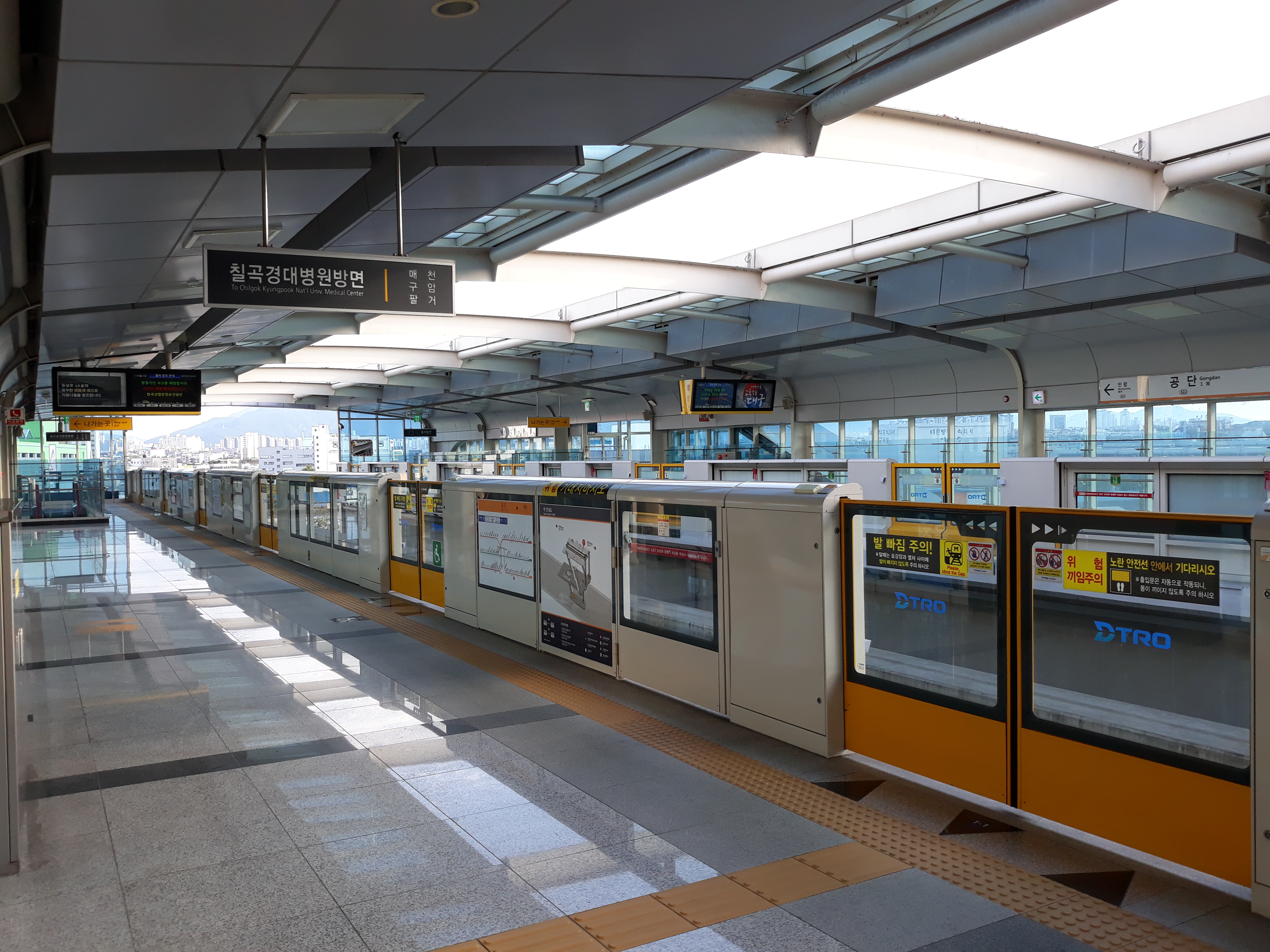
- Station platform

Korean name
- Hangul: 공단역
- Hanja: 工團驛
- Revised Romanization: Gongdan-yeok
- McCune–Reischauer: Kongdan-yŏk

General information
- Location: Bisan-dong, Seo District, Daegu; South Korea
- Coordinates: 35°53′33″N 128°33′11″E
- Operator: DTRO
- Line: Daegu Metro Line 3
- Platforms: 2
- Tracks: 2

Construction
- Structure type: Elevated

Other information
- Station code: 322

History
- Opened: 23 April 2015
Location

Gongdan station is a station of the Daegu Metro Line 3 in Bisan-dong, and Paldalno, Seo District, Daegu, South Korea. It is named after two industrial complexes.

Preceding station	Daegu Metro	Following station
Paldal towards Chilgok Kyungpook National University Medical Center	Line 3	Manpyeong towards Yongji
