= Buk-gu Office station =

Station of the Daegu Metro

326 북구청 (대구IM뱅크파크) Buk-gu Office (Daegu IM Bank Park)
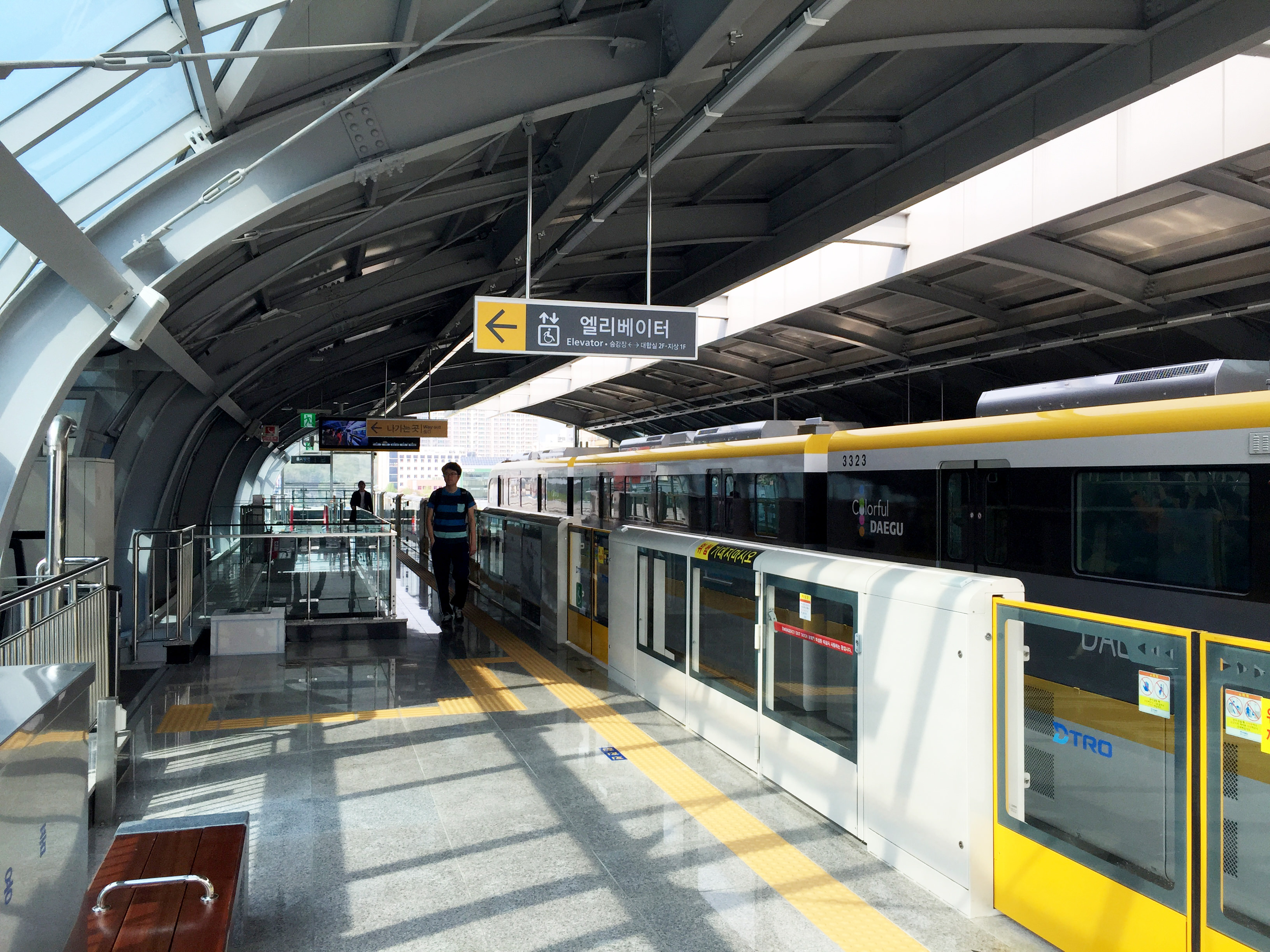
- The platforms of Buk-gu Office Station in 2015

Korean name
- Hangul: 북구청역
- Hanja: 北區廳驛
- Revised Romanization: Bukgucheong yeok
- McCune–Reischauer: Pukkuchŏng yŏk

General information
- Location: Wondae-dong, Seo District, Daegu; South Korea
- Coordinates: 35°53′02″N 128°34′53″E
- Operator: DTRO
- Line: Daegu Metro Line 3
- Platforms: 2
- Tracks: 2

Construction
- Structure type: Overground

Other information
- Station code: 326

History
- Opened: April 23, 2015

Services
Preceding station	Daegu Metro	Following station
Wondae towards Chilgok Kyungpook National University Medical Center	Line 3	Dalseong Park towards Yongji
Location

Buk-gu Office Station is a station of the Daegu Metro Line 3 in Wondae-dong, Seo District, Daegu, South Korea.
