= Myeongdeok station =

Station of the Daegu Metro

129 331 명덕 (2·28민주운동기념회관) Myeongdeok (2.28 Democracy Movement Hall)
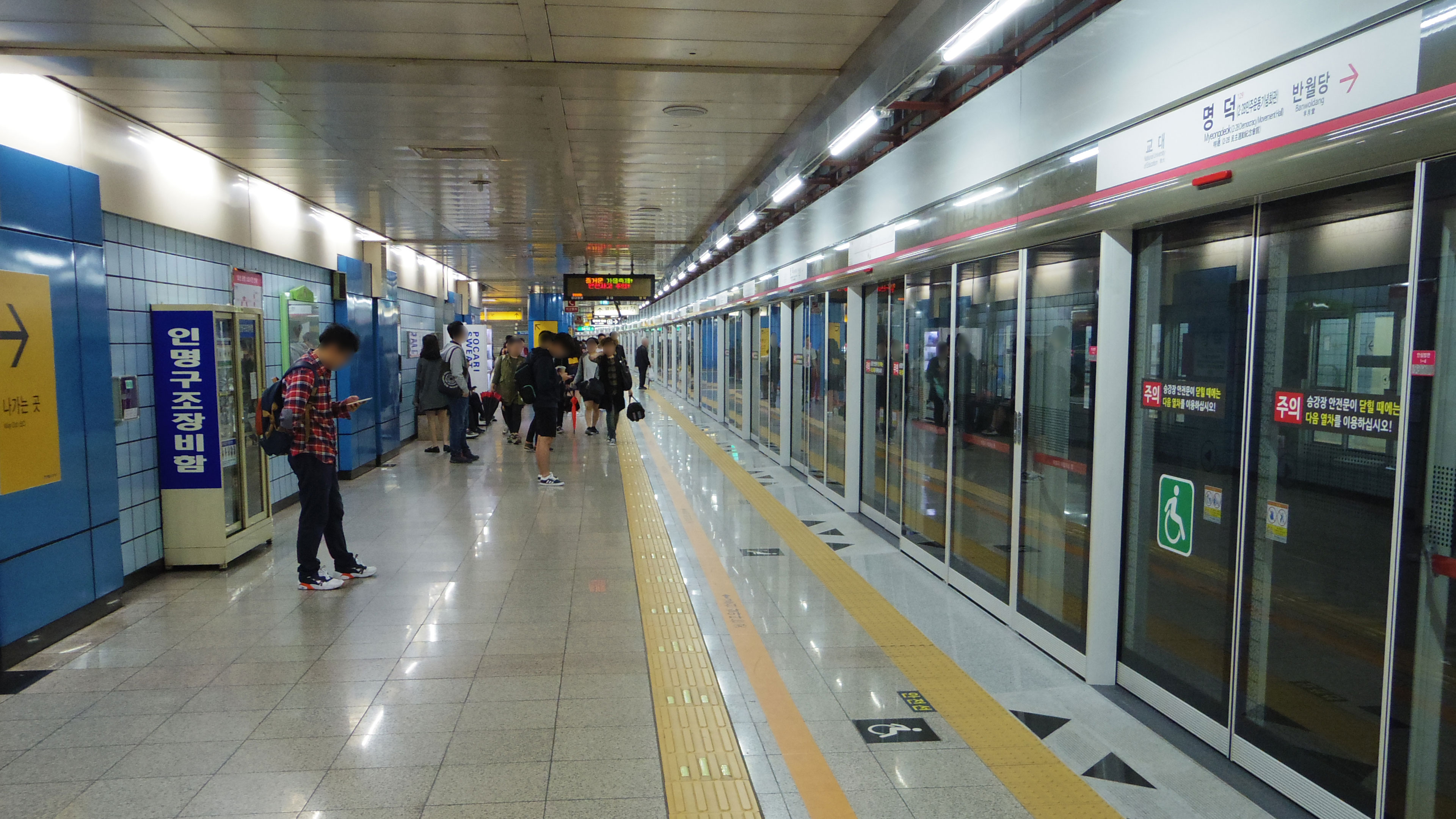
- Line 1 station platform

Korean name
- Hangul: 명덕
- Hanja: 明德
- Revised Romanization: Myeongdeok
- McCune–Reischauer: Myŏngdŏk

General information
- Location: Namsan-dong, Jung District (1); Daemyeong-dong, Nam District (3), Daegu; South Korea
- Coordinates: 35°51′28″N 128°35′28″E
- Operator: Daegu Transportation Corporation
- Lines: Line 1 Line 3
- Platforms: 2 each line
- Tracks: 2 each line
- Connections: Banwoldang station

Construction
- Structure type: Underground

Other information
- Station code: 129 (1); 331 (3)

History
- Opened: November 26, 1998; 27 years ago (1); April 23, 2015; 11 years ago (3)

Services
Preceding station	Daegu Metro	Following station
National University of Education towards Seolhwa–Myeonggok	Line 1	Banwoldang towards Hayang
Namsan towards Chilgok Kyungpook National University Medical Center	Line 3	Geondeulbawi towards Yongji
Location

Myeongdeok Station is a station of Metro Line 1 and Metro Line 3 in Namsan-dong, Jung District, Daegu, South Korea. On March 13, 2009, an entrance elevator was installed. There is connection track to the No. 2 subway line between Banwoldang station and Myeongdeok station.

== Station layout ==
G	Street Level	Exits
L1	Concourse	Faregates, Ticketing Machines, Station Control
Platform No. 1	Side platform, doors will open on the right
Platform No. 1	Westbound	← Line 1 toward Seolhwa–Myeonggok (National University of Education)
Platform No. 1	Eastbound	→ Line 1 toward Hayang (Banwoldang) →
Platform No. 1	Side platform, doors will open on the right
Line 3 Platforms	Side platform, doors will open on the right
Line 3 Platforms	Westbound	← Line 3 toward Chilgok Kyungpook Nat'l Univ. Medical Center (Namsan)
Line 3 Platforms	Eastbound	→ Line 3 toward Yongji (Geondeulbawi) →
Line 3 Platforms	Side platform, doors will open on the right

== Around the station ==
- Gyeongbuk Girls' Commercial High School
- Namsan-dong Post Office
- Daegu Myeongdeok Elementary School
- Woori Bank Myeongdeok Branch
- Prince Hotel
- Gyeongbuk Arts High School
- Daemyeong 2-dong Administrative Welfare Center
- Capital Mansion
- Dongdaegu Nonghyup Namsan Branch
- Gyeongbuk Girls' High School
- Nammun Market
- Namsan 1-dong Administrative Welfare Center
- Daegu Bank Nammun Market Branch
- Catholic Church Daegu Archdiocese Namsan Cathedral
- Catholic Daegu Archdiocese Office
- Daegu Catholic University College of Theology
- February 28 Democracy Movement Memorial Hall
- Cho Eunsori Hearing Aid
- Top Mart Daegu
