= Seomun Market station =

Station of the Daegu Metro

328 서문시장 (동산병원) Seomun Market (Dongsan Hospital)
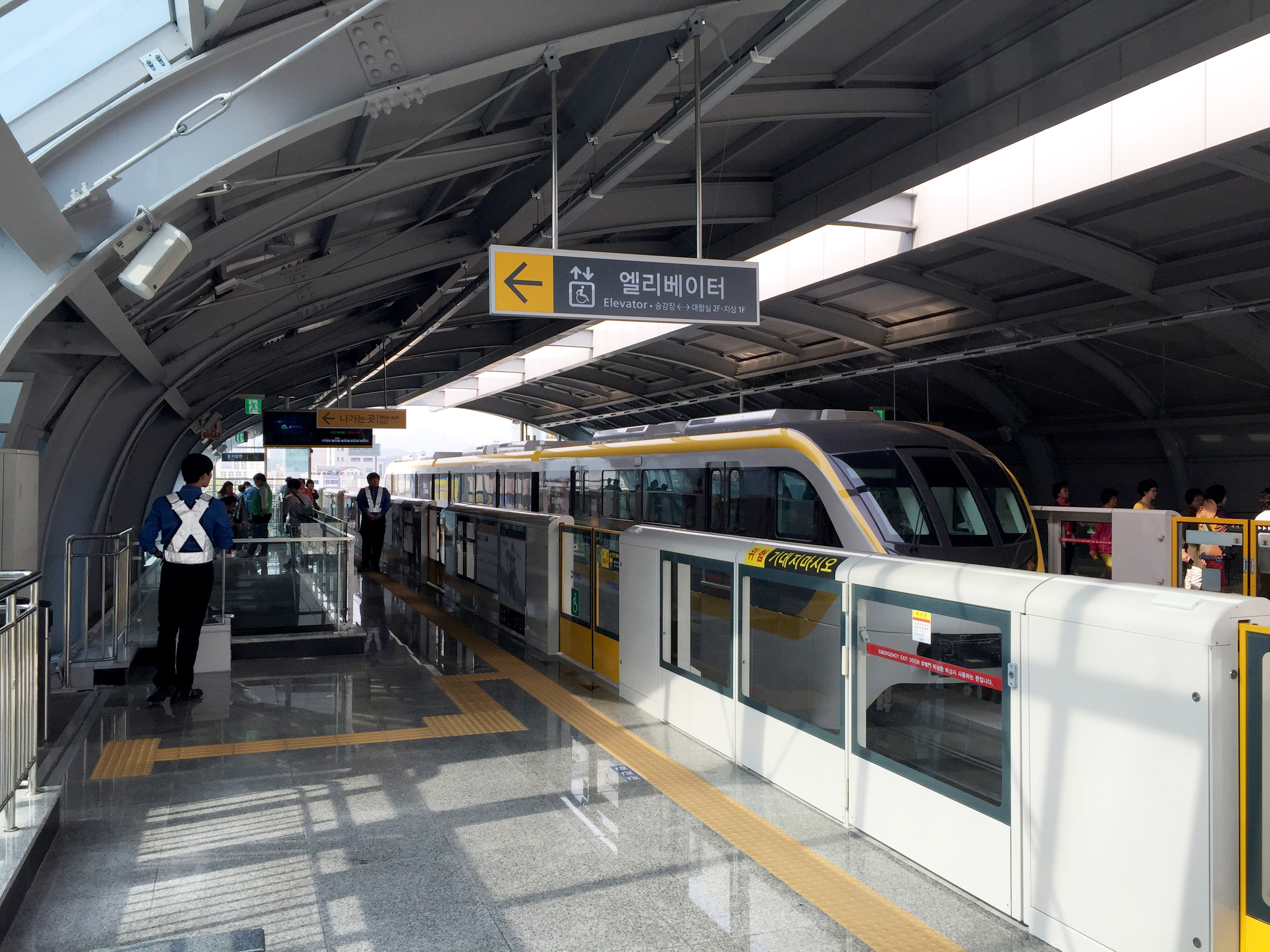
- A train at Seomun Market Station in April 2015

Korean name
- Hangul: 서문시장역
- Hanja: 西門市場驛
- Revised Romanization: Seomun-sijang-yeok
- McCune–Reischauer: Sŏmun-sijang-yŏk

General information
- Location: Daesin-dong, Jung District, Daegu; South Korea
- Coordinates: 35°52′11″N 128°34′56″E
- Operator: DTRO
- Line: Daegu Metro Line 3
- Platforms: 2
- Tracks: 2

Construction
- Structure type: Elevated

Other information
- Station code: 328

History
- Opened: April 23, 2015; 11 years ago

Services
Preceding station	Daegu Metro	Following station
Dalseong Park towards Chilgok Kyungpook National University Medical Center	Line 3	Cheongna Hill towards Yongji
Location

Seomun Market Station is a station of Daegu Subway Line 3 in Daesin-dong, and Sijangbungno, Jung District, Daegu, South Korea. It is named after Seomun Market, and is has the subname Dongsan Hospital.

== See also ==
Station exterior

- Seomun Market
- Keimyung University Dongsan Medical Center
