= Wondae station =

Station of the Daegu Metro

325 원대 Wondae
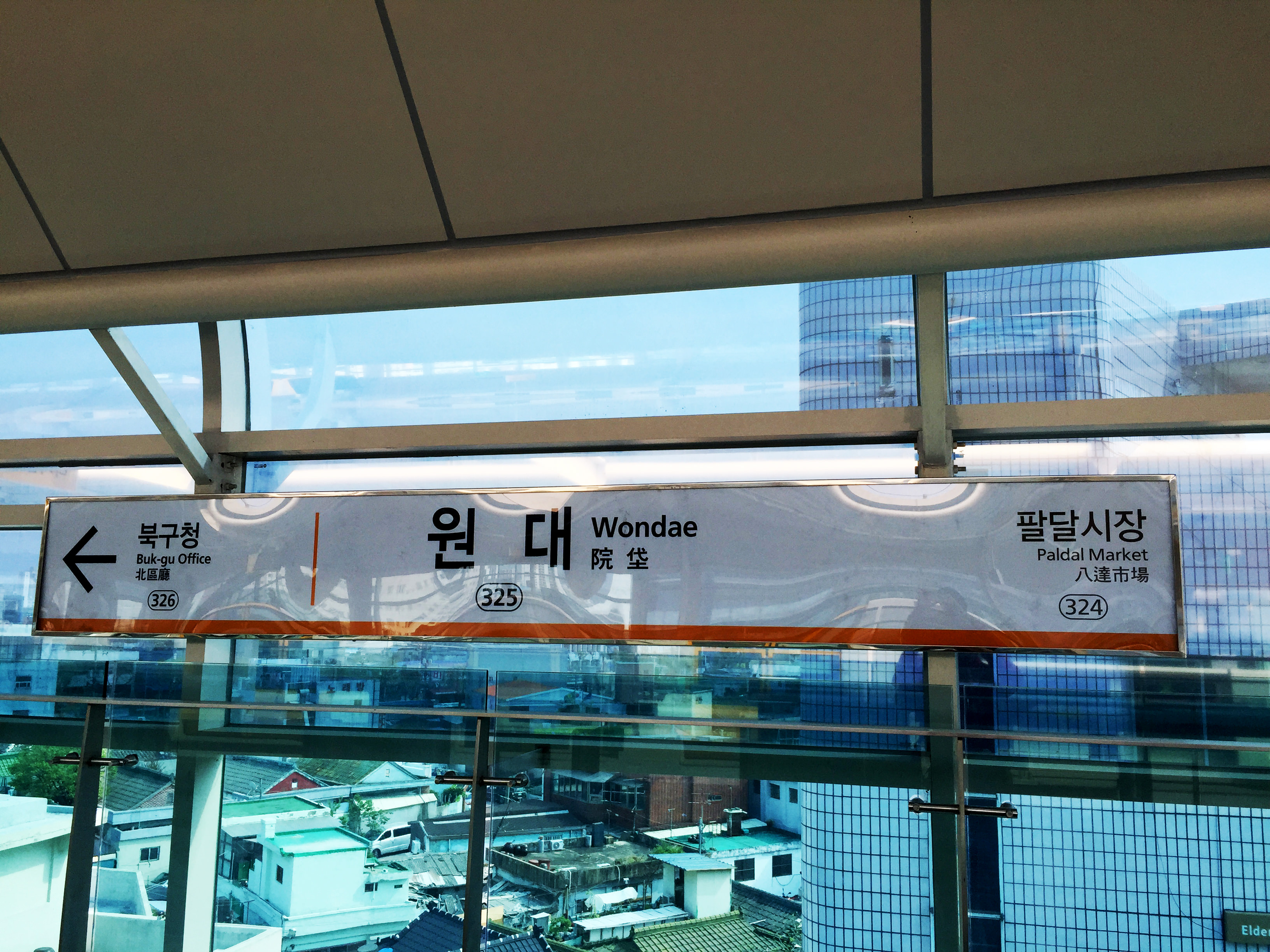

Korean name
- Hangul: 원대역
- Hanja: 院垈驛
- Revised Romanization: Wondae yeok
- McCune–Reischauer: Wŏntae yŏk

General information
- Location: Wondae-dong, Seo District, Daegu; South Korea
- Coordinates: 35°53′16″N 128°34′28″E
- Operator: DTRO
- Line: Daegu Metro Line 3
- Platforms: 2
- Tracks: 2

Construction
- Structure type: Overground

Other information
- Station code: 325

History
- Opened: April 23, 2015

Services
Preceding station	Daegu Metro	Following station
Paldal Market towards Chilgok Kyungpook National University Medical Center	Line 3	Buk-gu Office towards Yongji
Location

Wondae Station is a station of the Daegu Metro Line 3 in Wondae-dong, Seo District, Daegu, South Korea.
