= Daebonggyo station =

Station of the Daegu Metro

333 대봉교 Daebonggyo
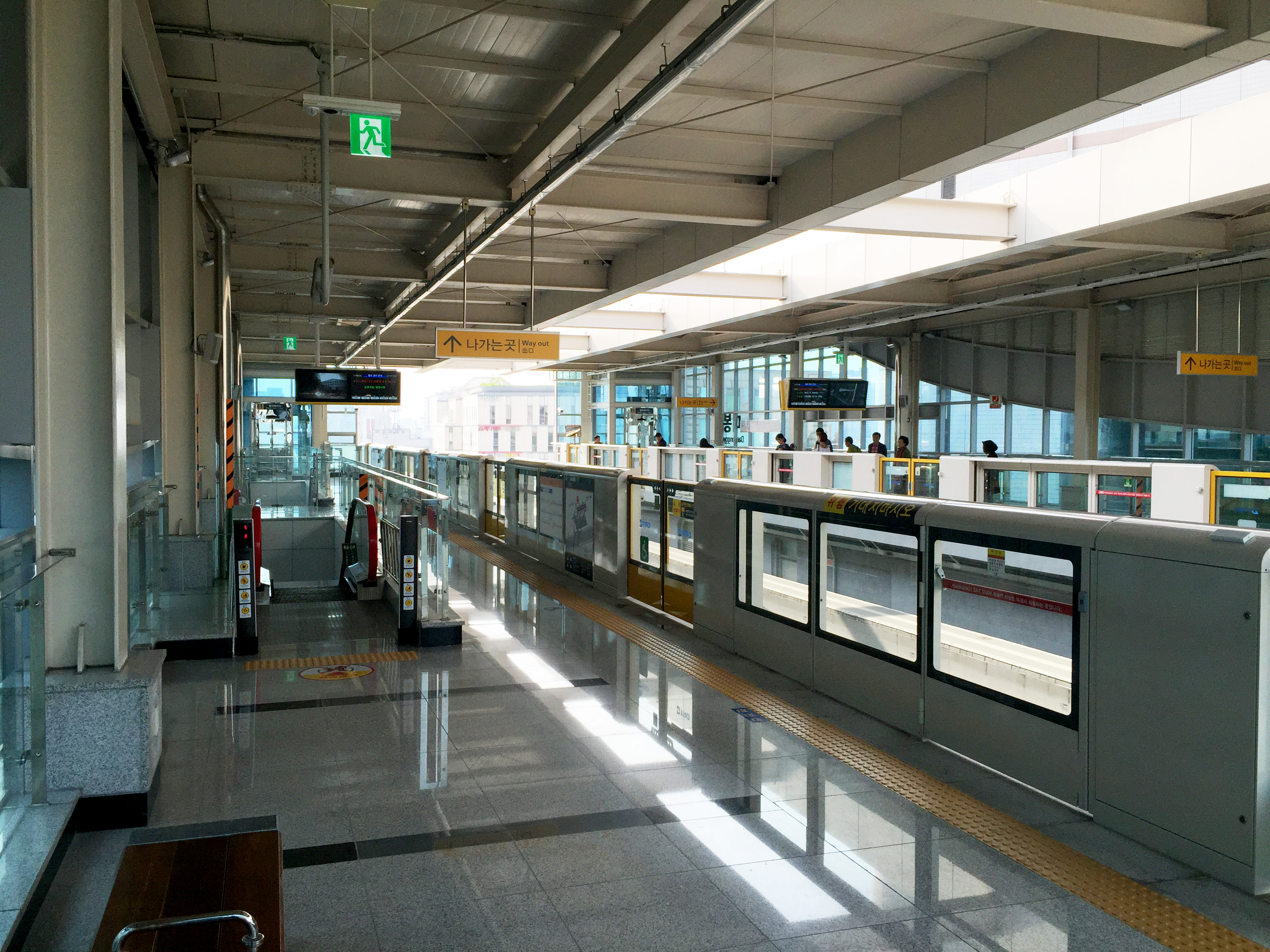
- The platforms at Daebonggyo Station in April 2015

Korean name
- Hangul: 대봉교역
- Hanja: 大鳳橋驛
- Revised Romanization: Daebonggyo yeok
- McCune–Reischauer: Taepongkyo yŏk

General information
- Location: Daebong-dong, Seo District, Daegu; South Korea
- Coordinates: 35°51′16″N 128°36′23″E
- Operator: DTRO
- Line: Daegu Metro Line 3
- Platforms: 2
- Tracks: 2

Construction
- Structure type: Overground

Other information
- Station code: 333

History
- Opened: April 23, 2015; 11 years ago

Services
Preceding station	Daegu Metro	Following station
Geondeulbawi towards Chilgok Kyungpook National University Medical Center	Line 3	Suseong Market towards Yongji
Location

Daebonggyo Station is a station of the Daegu Metro Line 3 in Daebong-dong, Seo District, Daegu, South Korea.
