= Jisan station =

Station of the Daegu Metro

339 지산 Jisan
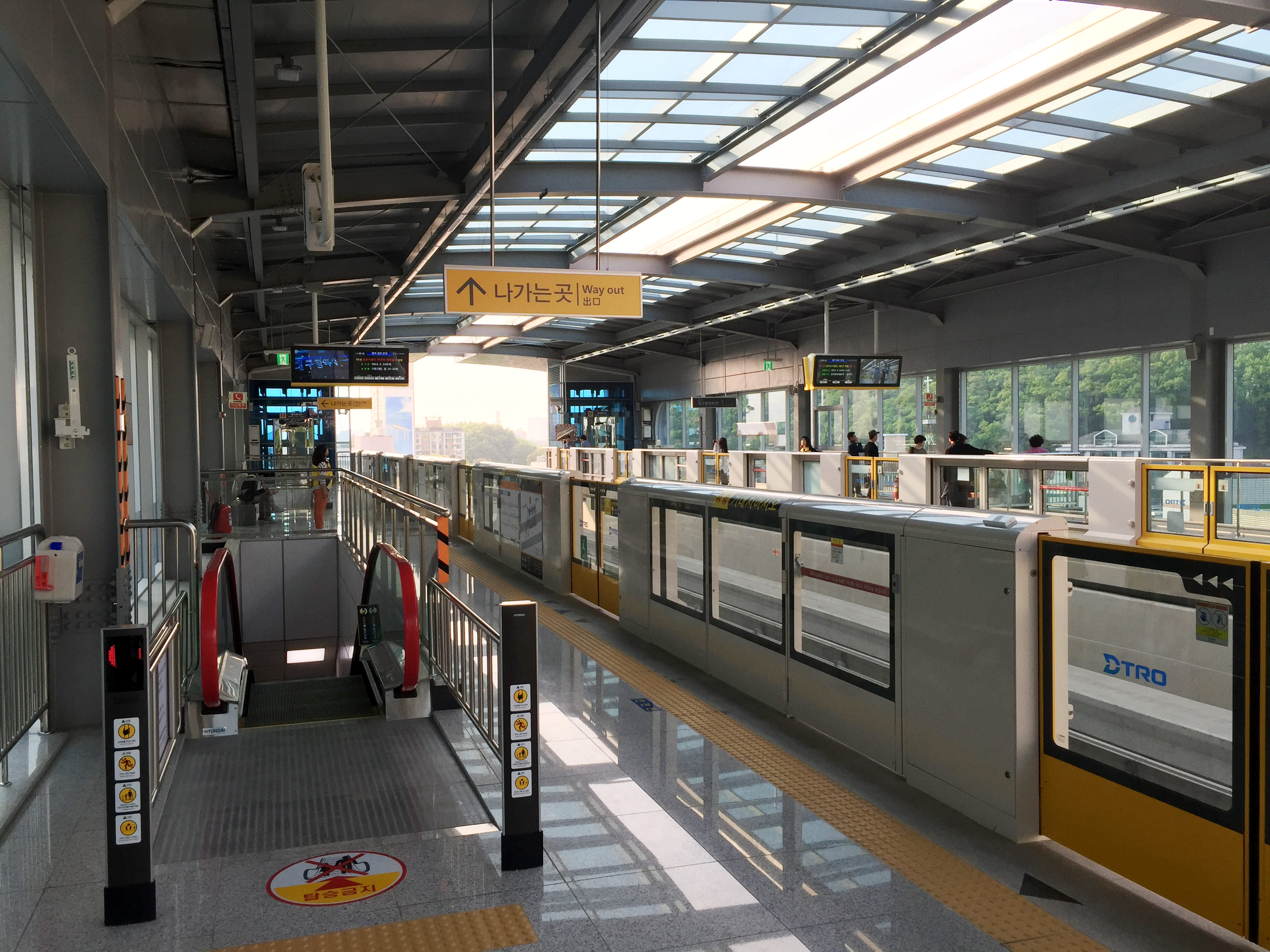

Korean name
- Hangul: 지산역
- Hanja: 池山驛
- Revised Romanization: Jisan yeok
- McCune–Reischauer: Chisan yŏk

General information
- Location: Jisan-dong, Suseong District, Daegu; South Korea
- Coordinates: 35°49′34″N 128°37′45″E
- Operator: DTRO
- Line: Daegu Metro Line 3
- Platforms: 2
- Tracks: 2

Construction
- Structure type: Overground

Other information
- Station code: 339

History
- Opened: April 23, 2015
Location

Jisan Station is a station of the Daegu Metro Line 3 in Jisan-dong, Suseong District, Daegu, South Korea.

Preceding station	Daegu Metro	Following station
Suseongmot towards Chilgok Kyungpook National University Medical Center	Line 3	Beommul towards Yongji
