= Hwanggeum station =

Station of the Daegu Metro

337 황금 Hwanggeum
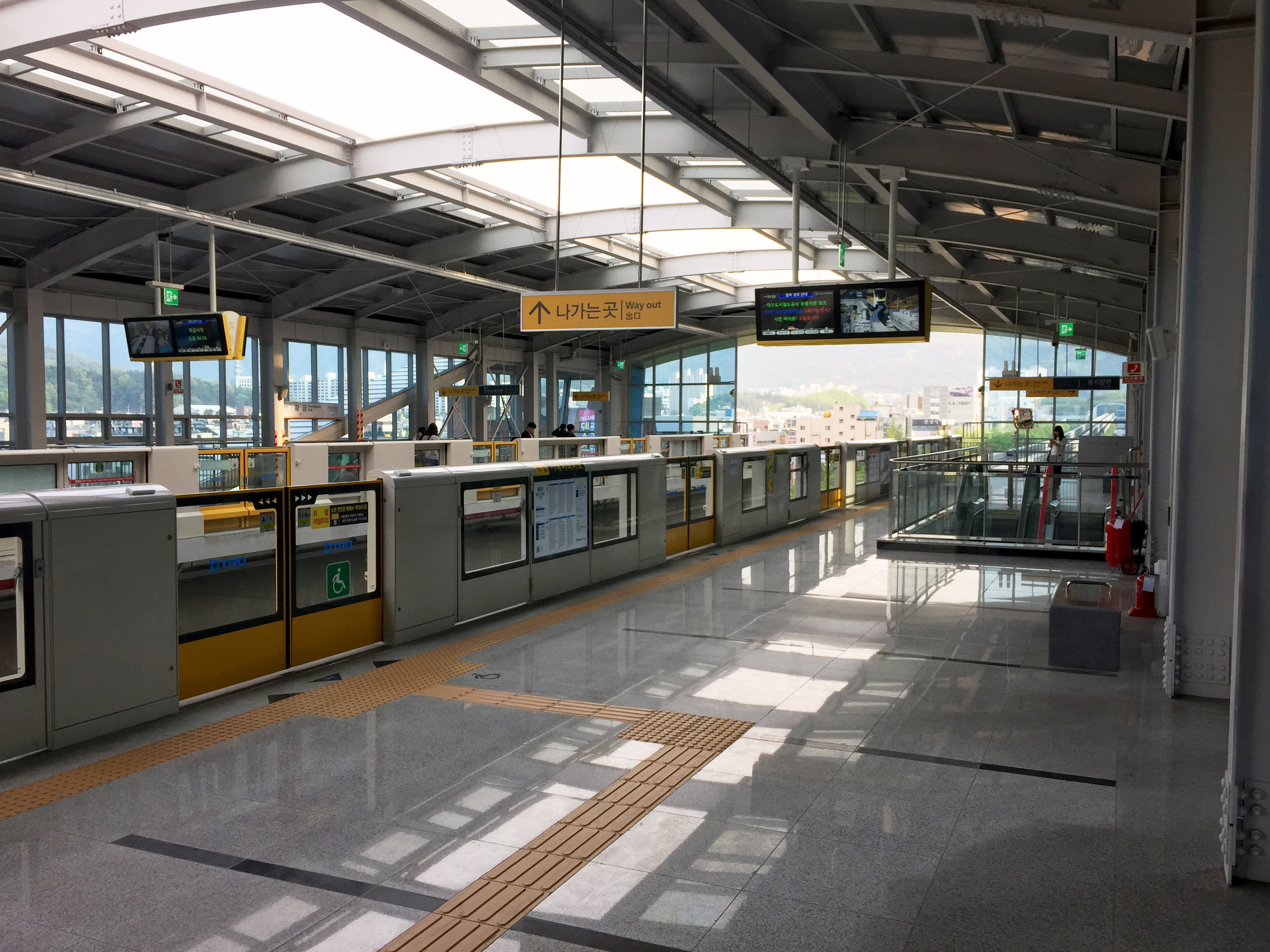

Korean name
- Hangul: 황금역
- Hanja: 黃金驛
- Revised Romanization: Hwanggum yeok
- McCune–Reischauer: Hwanggŭm yŏk

General information
- Location: Dusan-dong, Suseong District, Daegu; South Korea
- Coordinates: 35°50′20″N 128°37′26″E
- Operator: DTRO
- Line: Daegu Metro Line 3
- Platforms: 2
- Tracks: 2

Construction
- Structure type: Overground

Other information
- Station code: 337

History
- Opened: April 23, 2015
Location

Hwanggeum Station is a station of the Daegu Metro Line 3 in Dusan-dong, Suseong District, Daegu, South Korea.

Preceding station	Daegu Metro	Following station
Children's World towards Chilgok Kyungpook National University Medical Center	Line 3	Suseongmot towards Yongji
