= Cheongna Hill station =

Station of the Daegu Metro

229 329 청라언덕 (신남) Cheongna Hill (Sinnam)
- Line 3

Korean name
- Hangul: 청라언덕
- Hanja: 靑蘿언덕
- Revised Romanization: Cheongna-eondeok
- McCune–Reischauer: Ch'ŏngna-ŏndŏk

General information
- Location: Dongsan-dong, Jung District, Daegu; South Korea
- Coordinates: 35°51′54″N 128°34′59″E
- Operator: Daegu Transportation Corporation
- Lines: Line 2 Line 3
- Platforms: 3
- Tracks: 4

Construction
- Structure type: Underground/Aboveground
- Accessible: Yes

Other information
- Station code: ● Line 2: 229 ● Line 3: 329

History
- Opened: October 18, 2005; 21 years ago (Line 2); April 23, 2015; 11 years ago (Line 3)

Services
Preceding station	Daegu Metro	Following station
Bangogae towards Munyang	Line 2	Banwoldang towards Yeungnam University
Seomun Market towards Chilgok Kyungpook National University Medical Center	Line 3	Namsan towards Yongji
Location

Cheongna Hill Station is a station of Daegu Subway Line 2 and Line 3 in Daesin-dong, Dongsan-dong, and Namsan-dong, Jung District, Daegu, South Korea.

== Around the station ==
- Seomun Market
- Keimyung University Dongsan Medical Center
- Seomun Market Station
