= Dalseong Park station =

Station of the Daegu Metro

327 달성공원 Dalseong Park
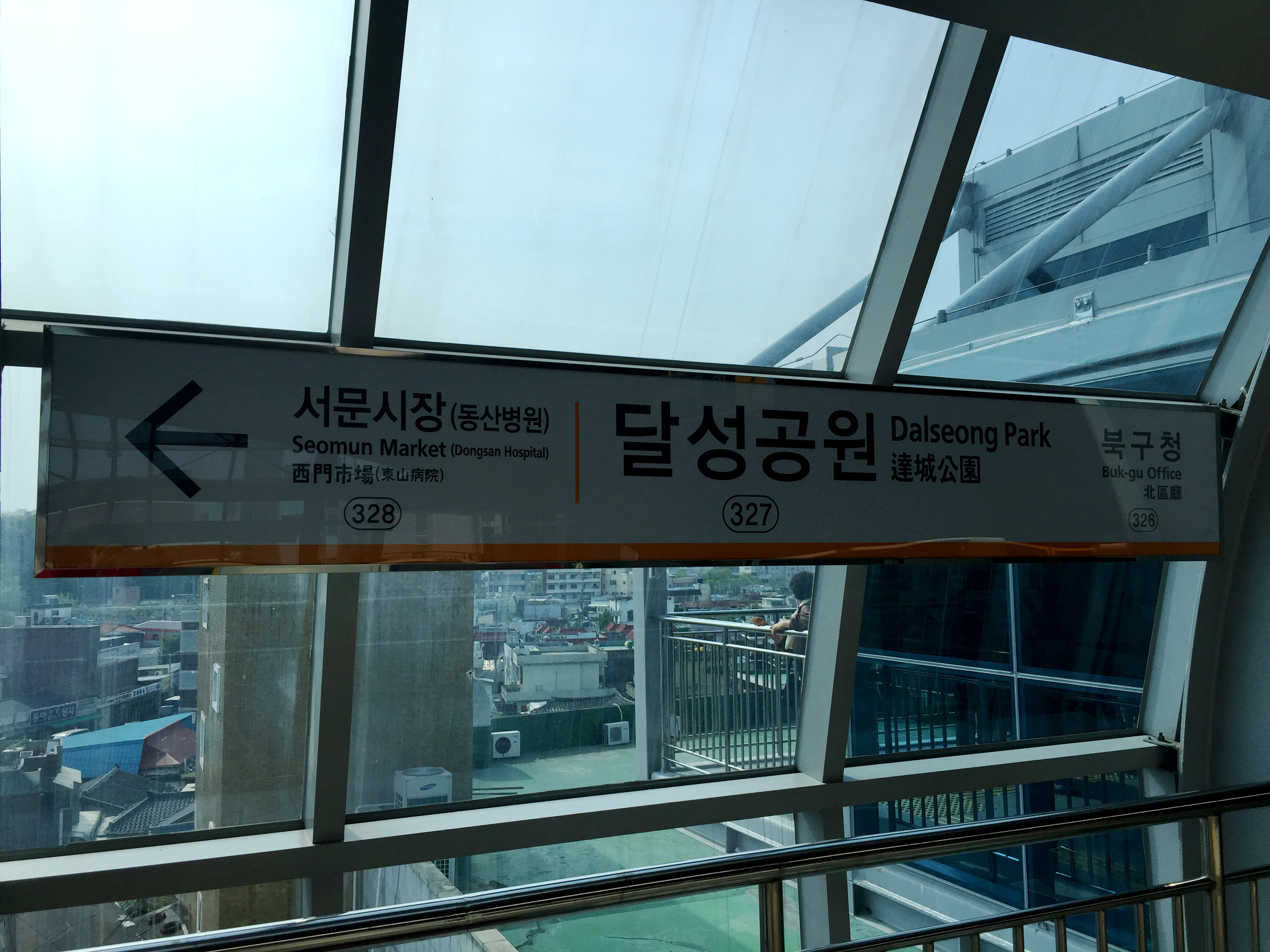

Korean name
- Hangul: 달성공원역
- Hanja: 達城公園驛
- Revised Romanization: Dalseong gongwon yeok
- McCune–Reischauer: Talsŏng kongwŏn yŏk

General information
- Location: Soochang-dong, Jung District, Daegu; South Korea
- Coordinates: 35°52′33″N 128°34′56″E
- Operator: DTRO
- Platforms: 2
- Tracks: 2

Construction
- Structure type: Overground

Other information
- Station code: 327

History
- Opened: April 23, 2015; 11 years ago

Services
Preceding station	Daegu Metro	Following station
Buk-gu Office towards Chilgok Kyungpook National University Medical Center	Line 3	Seomun Market towards Yongji
Location

Station exterior

Dalseong Park station (Korean: 달성공원역) is a station of the Daegu Metro Line 3 in Soochang-dong, Jung District, Daegu, South Korea.

== History ==
Dalseong Park station is a station in Daegu Metro Line 3.
