= Dongcheon station (Daegu Metro) =

Station of the Daegu Metro

315 동천 Dongcheon
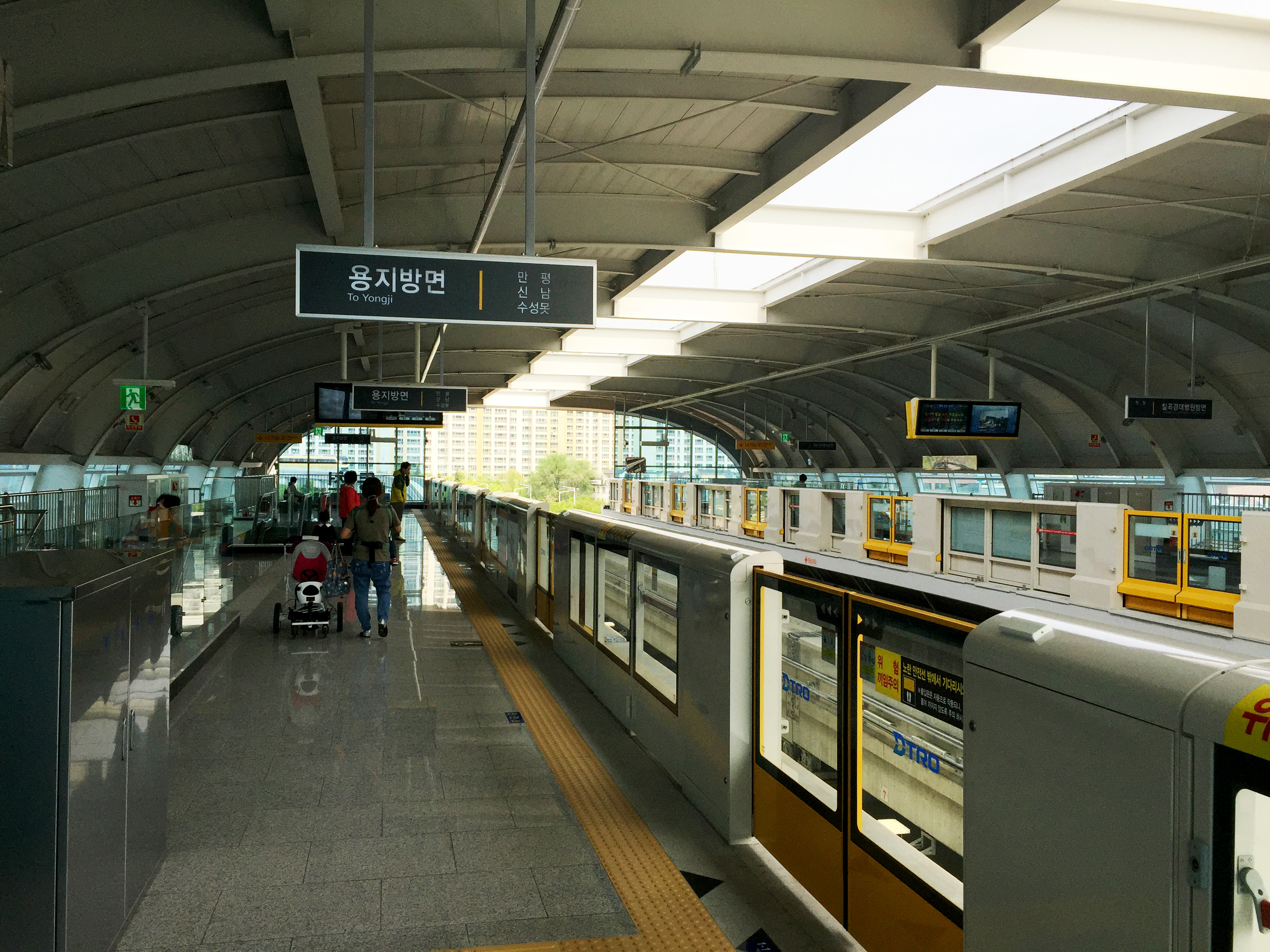
- The platforms of Dongcheon station in April 2015

Korean name
- Hangul: 동천역
- Hanja: 東川驛
- Revised Romanization: Dongcheon yeok
- McCune–Reischauer: Tongch'ŏn yŏk

General information
- Location: Dongcheon-dong, Buk District, Daegu; South Korea
- Coordinates: 35°56′16″N 128°33′24″E
- Operator: DTRO
- Line: Daegu Metro Line 3
- Platforms: 2
- Tracks: 2

Construction
- Structure type: Overground

Other information
- Station code: 315

History
- Opened: April 23, 2015

Services
Preceding station	Daegu Metro	Following station
Palgeo towards Chilgok Kyungpook National University Medical Center	Line 3	Chilgok-Unam towards Yongji
Location

Dongcheon station is a station of the Daegu Metro Line 3 in Dongcheon-dong, Buk District, Daegu, South Korea.
