= Maecheon Market station =

Station of the Daegu Metro

320 매천시장 Maecheon Market
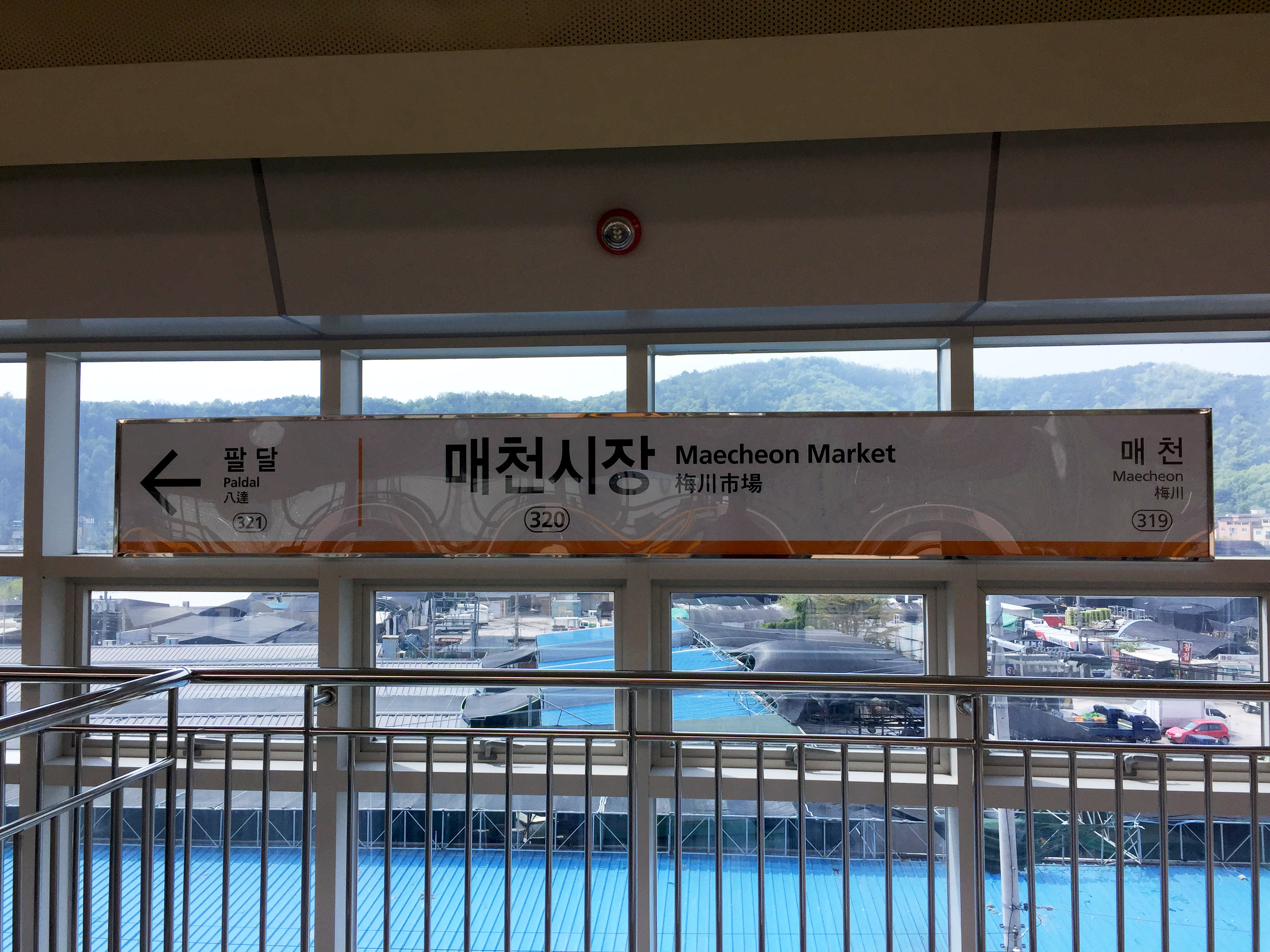

Korean name
- Hangul: 매천시장역
- Hanja: 梅川市場驛
- Revised Romanization: Maecheon sijang yeok
- McCune–Reischauer: Maech'ŏn sijang yŏk

General information
- Location: Maecheon-dong, Buk District, Daegu; South Korea
- Coordinates: 35°54′16″N 128°32′45″E
- Operator: DTRO
- Line: Daegu Metro Line 3
- Platforms: 2
- Tracks: 2

Construction
- Structure type: Overground

Other information
- Station code: 320

History
- Opened: April 23, 2015
Location

Maecheon Market Station is a station of Daegu Metro Line 3 in Maecheon-dong, Buk District, Daegu, South Korea.

Preceding station	Daegu Metro	Following station
Maecheon towards Chilgok Kyungpook National University Medical Center	Line 3	Paldal towards Yongji
