= Paldal station =

Station of the Daegu Metro

321 팔달 Paldal
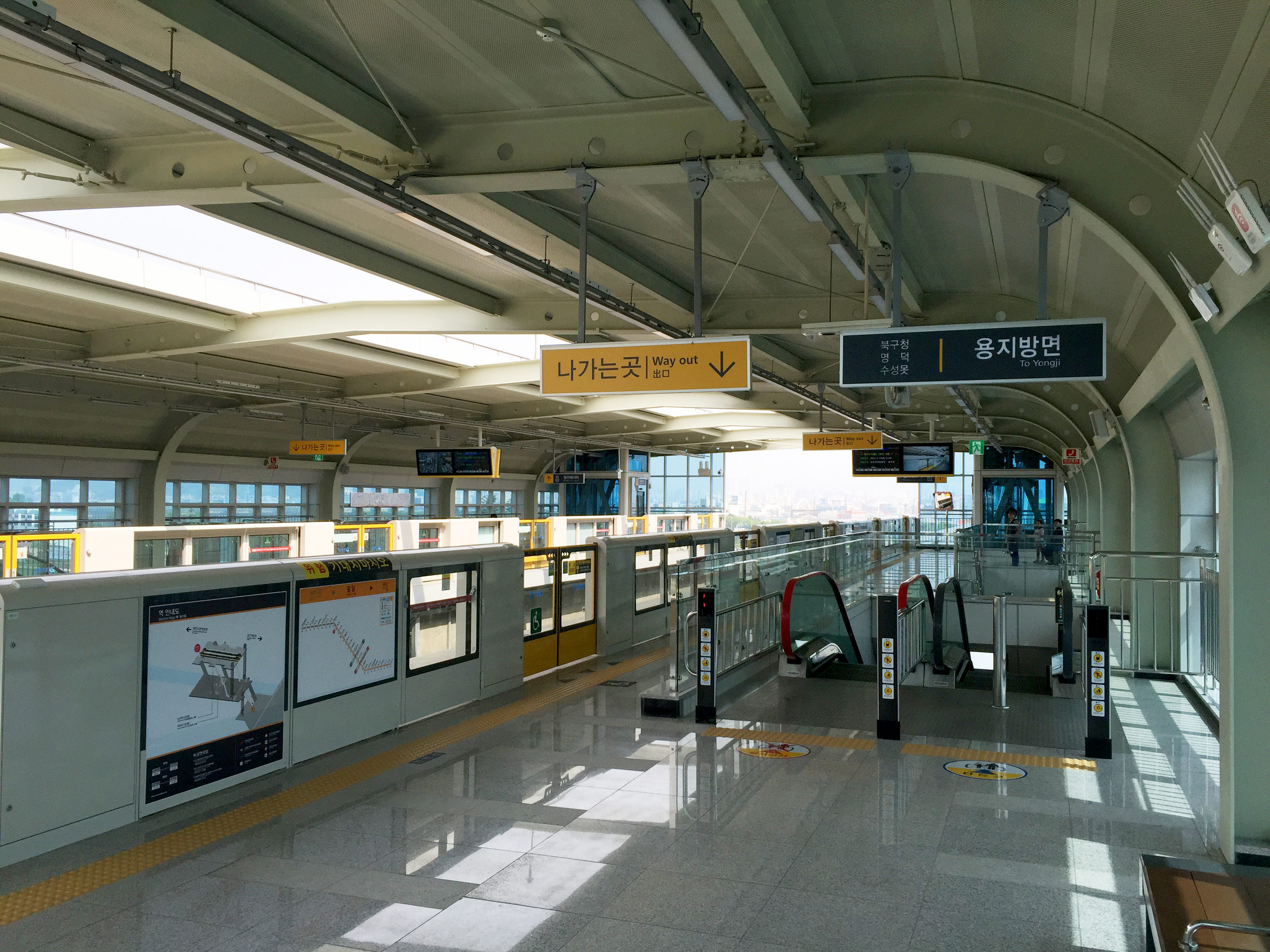
- The platforms in 2015

Korean name
- Hangul: 팔달역
- Hanja: 八達驛
- Revised Romanization: Paldal yeok
- McCune–Reischauer: P'altal yŏk

General information
- Location: Paldal-dong, Buk District, Daegu; South Korea
- Coordinates: 35°53′52″N 128°32′48″E
- Operator: DTRO
- Line: Daegu Metro Line 3
- Platforms: 2
- Tracks: 2

Construction
- Structure type: Overground

Other information
- Station code: 321

History
- Opened: April 23, 2015
Location

Paldal Station is a station of the Daegu Metro Line 3 in Paldal-dong, Buk District, Daegu, South Korea.

Preceding station	Daegu Metro	Following station
Maecheon Market towards Chilgok Kyungpook National University Medical Center	Line 3	Gongdan towards Yongji
