= Namsan station (Daegu Metro) =

Station of the Daegu Metro

330 남산 (계명네거리) Namsan (Gyemyeongnegeori)
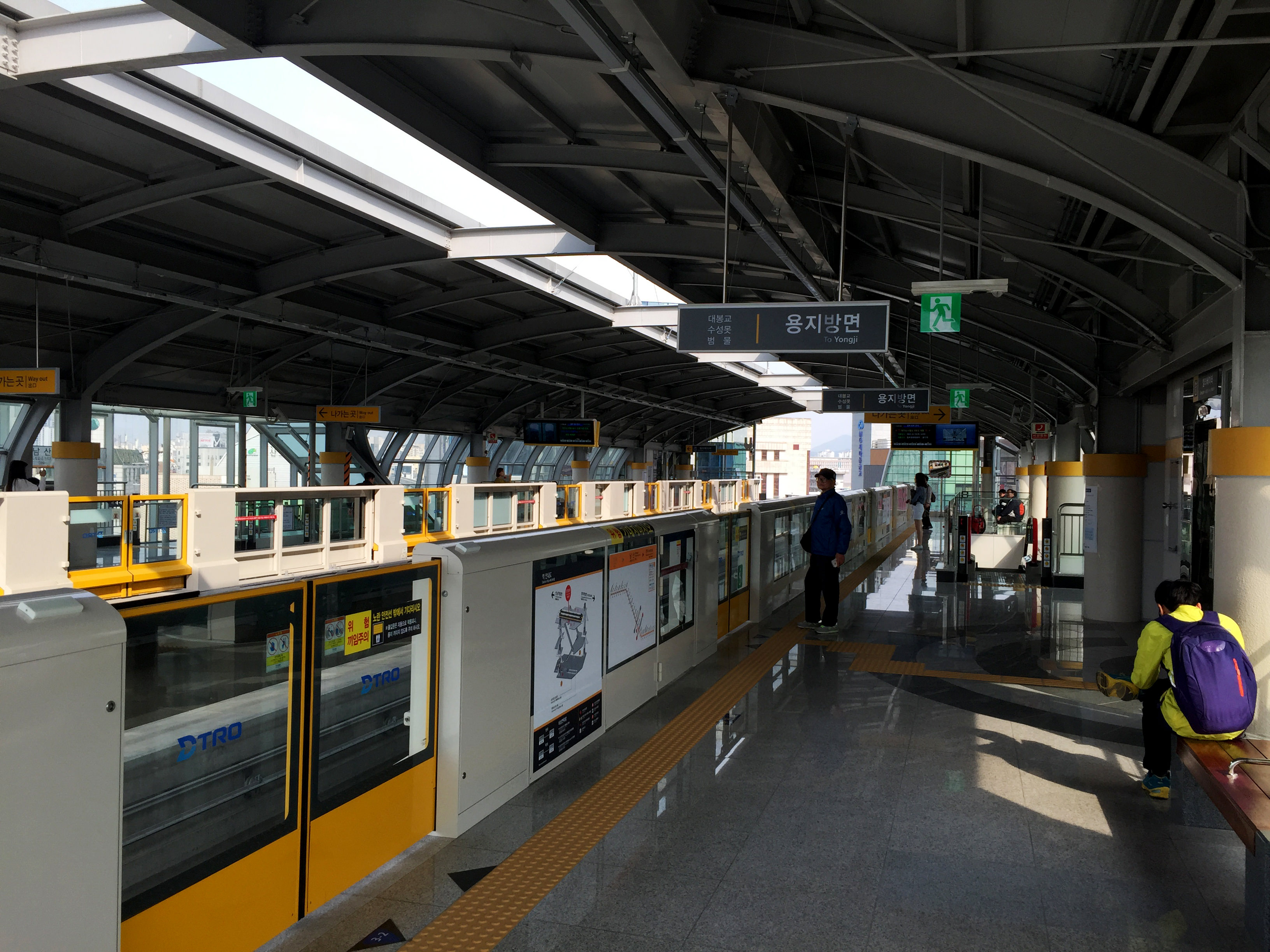
- Station platform

Korean name
- Hangul: 남산역
- Hanja: 南山驛
- Revised Romanization: Namsan-nyeok
- McCune–Reischauer: Namsan-nyŏk

General information
- Location: Namsan-dong, Jung District, Daegu; South Korea
- Coordinates: 35°51′24″N 128°35′01″E
- Operator: DTRO
- Line: Daegu Metro Line 3
- Platforms: 2
- Tracks: 2

Construction
- Structure type: Elevated

Other information
- Station code: 330

History
- Opened: April 23, 2015; 11 years ago

Services
Preceding station	Daegu Metro	Following station
Cheongna Hill towards Chilgok Kyungpook National University Medical Center	Line 3	Myeongdeok towards Yongji
Location

Namsan Station (Korean: 남산역; Hanja: 南山驛) is a station of Daegu Subway Line 3 in Namsan-dong, and Namsanno, Jung District, Daegu, South Korea. It is named after Namsan-dong. Its station subname is Gyemyeongnegeori.

== See also ==
- Keimyung University
