= Suseong District Stadium station =

Station of the Daegu Metro

335 수성구민운동장 Suseong District Stadium
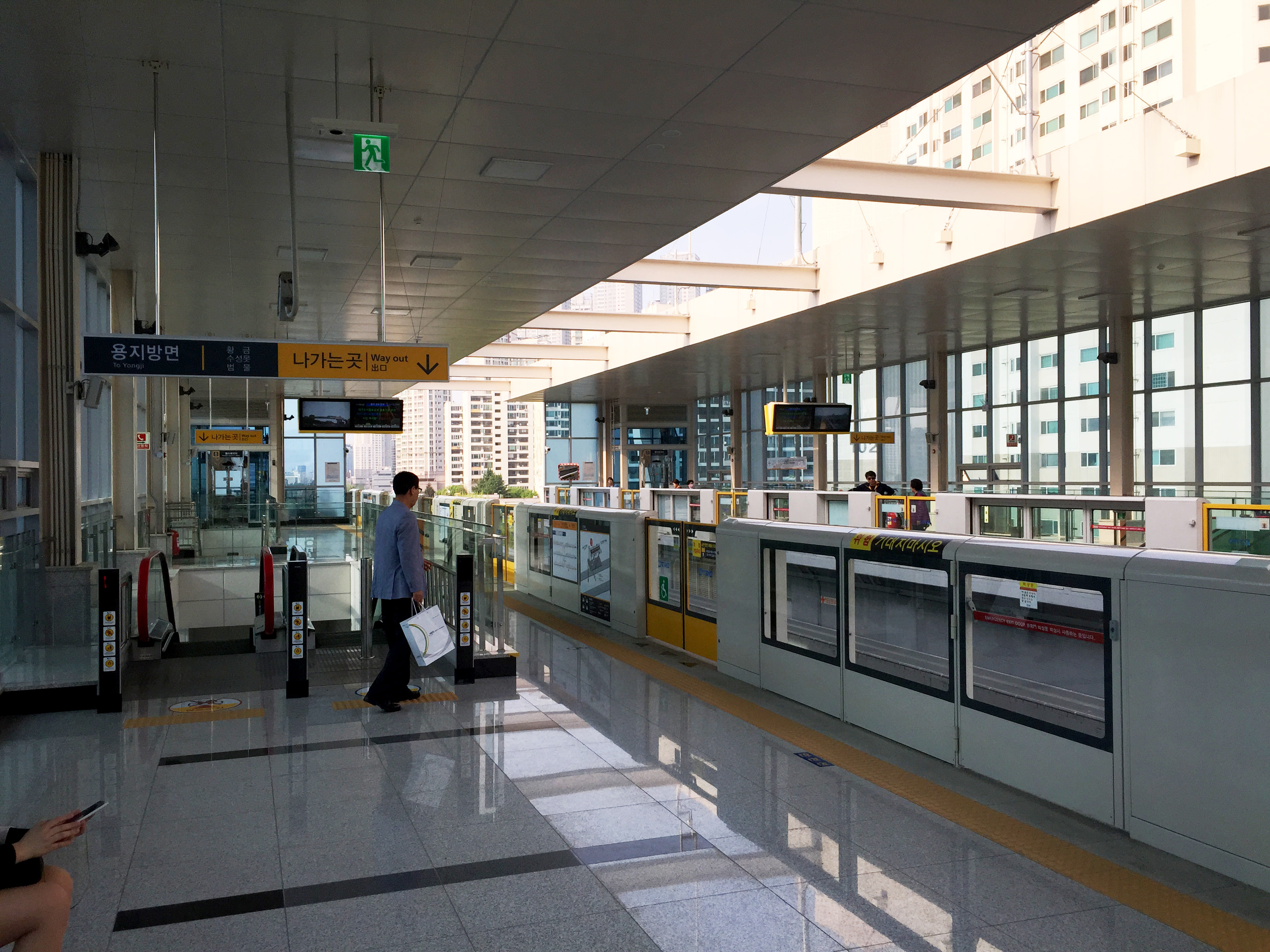
- The station platform in April 2015

Korean name
- Hangul: 수성구민운동장역
- Hanja: 壽城區民運動場驛
- Revised Romanization: Suseonggumin undongjang yeok
- McCune–Reischauer: Susŏnggumin undongjang yŏk

General information
- Location: Beomeo-dong, Suseong District, Daegu; South Korea
- Coordinates: 35°51′09″N 128°37′30″E
- Operator: DTRO
- Line: Daegu Metro Line 3
- Platforms: 2
- Tracks: 2

Construction
- Structure type: Overground

Other information
- Station code: 335

History
- Opened: April 23, 2015

Services
| Preceding station | Daegu Metro | Following station |
|---|---|---|
| Suseong Market towards Chilgok Kyungpook National University Medical Center | Line 3 | Children's World towards Yongji |
Location

Suseong District Stadium Station is a station of the Daegu Metro Line 3 in Beomeo-dong, Suseong District, Daegu, South Korea.
