= Beommul station =

Station of the Daegu Metro

340 범물 Beommul
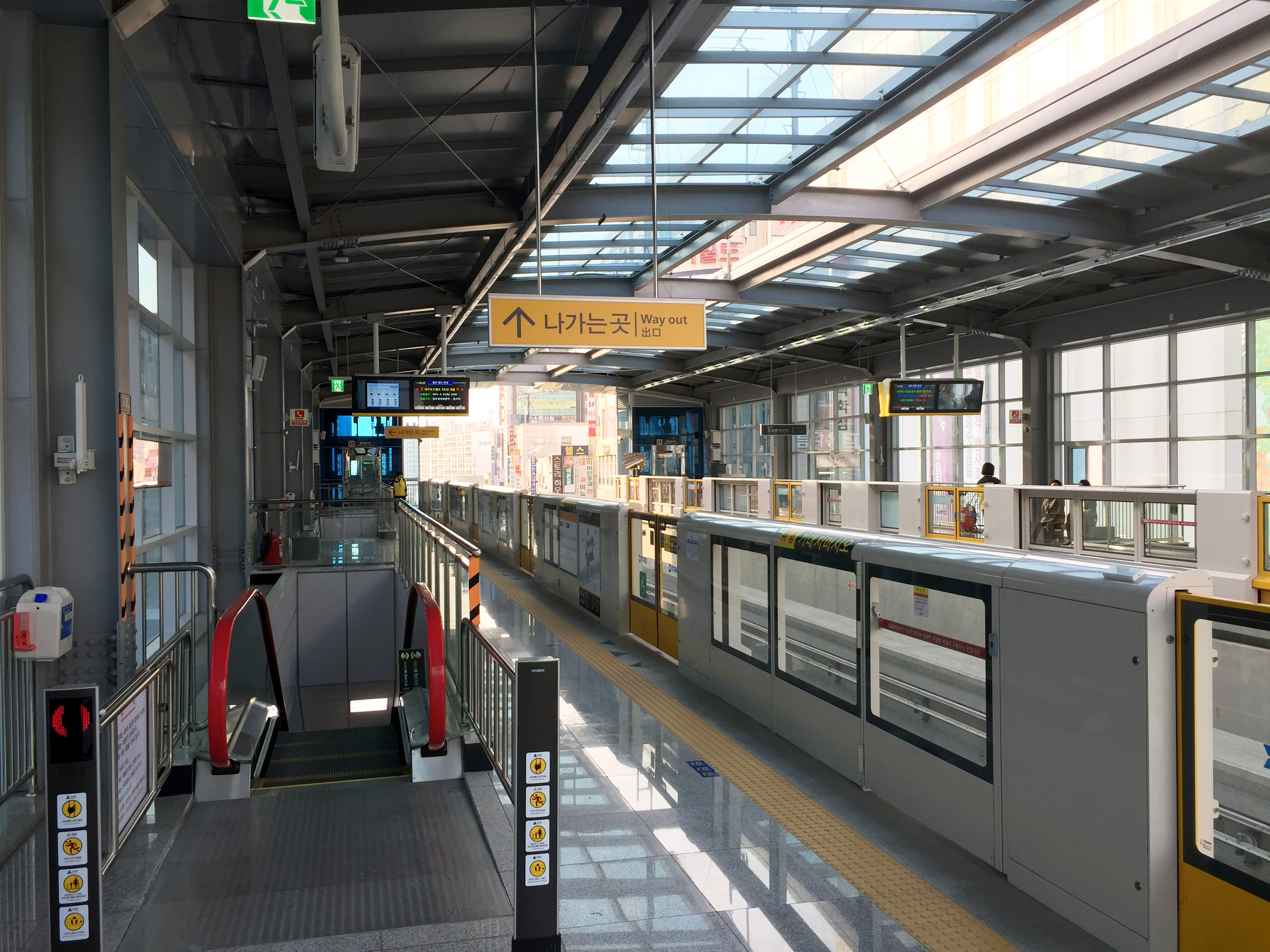
- The platforms of Beommul Station in 2015

Korean name
- Hangul: 범물역
- Hanja: 凡勿驛
- Revised Romanization: Beommul yeok
- McCune–Reischauer: Pŏmmul yŏk

General information
- Location: Beommul-dong, Suseong District, Daegu; South Korea
- Coordinates: 35°49′18″N 128°38′19″E
- Operator: DTRO
- Line: Daegu Metro Line 3
- Platforms: 2
- Tracks: 2

Construction
- Structure type: Overground

Other information
- Station code: 340

History
- Opened: April 23, 2015
Location

Beommul Station is a station of the Daegu Metro Line 3 in Beommul-dong, Suseong District, Daegu, South Korea.

Preceding station	Daegu Metro	Following station
Jisan towards Chilgok Kyungpook National University Medical Center	Line 3	Yongji Terminus
