= Geondeulbawi station =

Station of the Daegu Metro

332 건들바위 Geondeulbawi
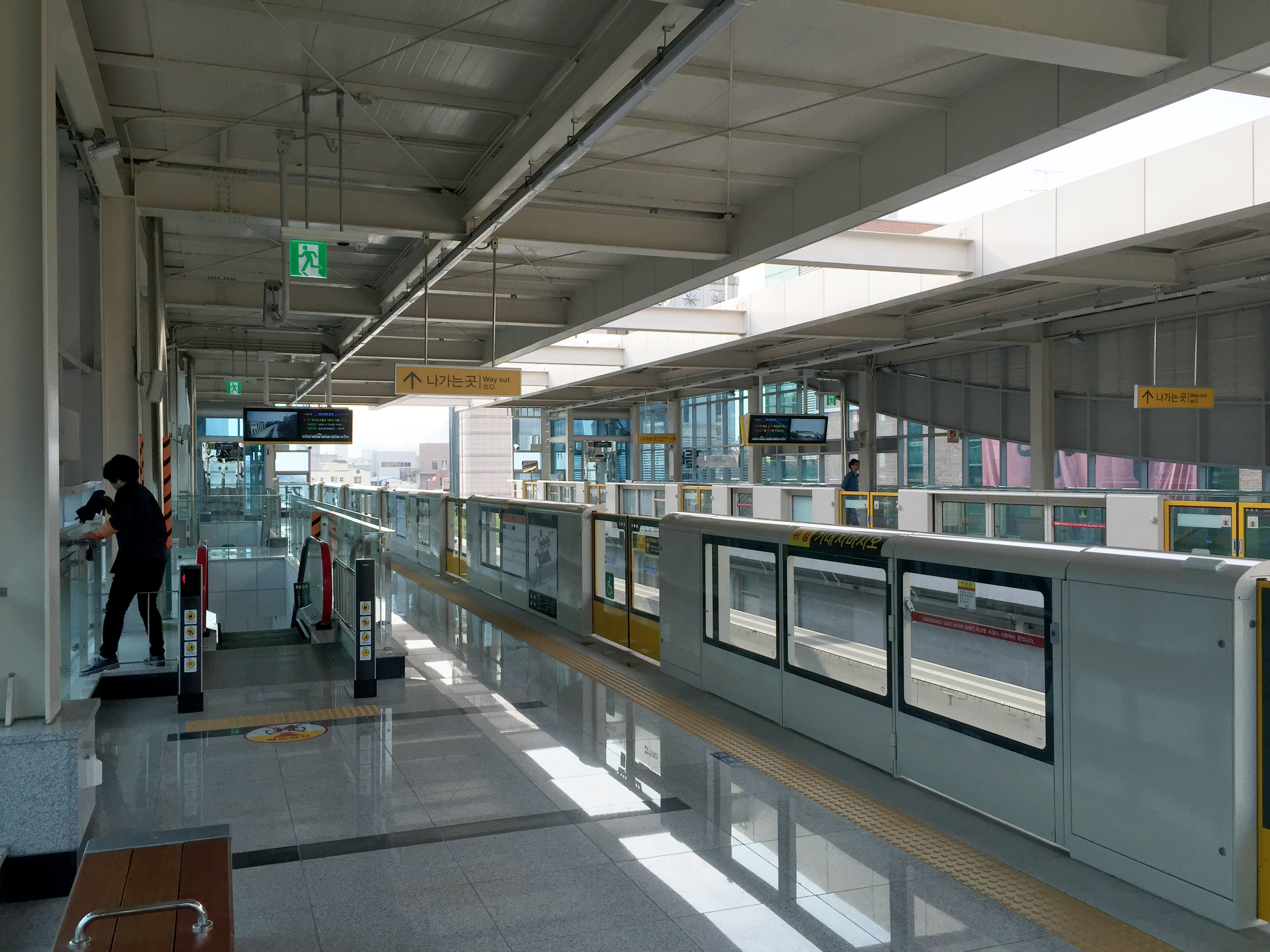
- The platforms of Geondeulbawi Station in April 2015

Korean name
- Hangul: 건들바위역
- Hanja: 건들바위驛
- Revised Romanization: Geondeulbawi-yeok
- McCune–Reischauer: Kŏndŭlbawi-yŏk

General information
- Location: Icheon-dong, Nam District, Daegu; South Korea
- Coordinates: 35°51′19″N 128°35′59″E
- Operator: DTRO
- Line: Daegu Metro Line 3
- Platforms: 2
- Tracks: 2

Construction
- Structure type: Overground

Other information
- Station code: 332

History
- Opened: April 23, 2015; 11 years ago
Location

Station exterior

Geondeulbawi Station is a station of the Daegu Metro Line 3 in Icheon-dong, Nam District, Daegu, South Korea.

Preceding station	Daegu Metro	Following station
Myeongdeok towards Chilgok Kyungpook National University Medical Center	Line 3	Daebonggyo towards Yongji
