= Palgeo station =

Station of the Daegu Metro

314 팔거 (국립농관원·통계청) Palgeo (NAQS·KOSTAT)
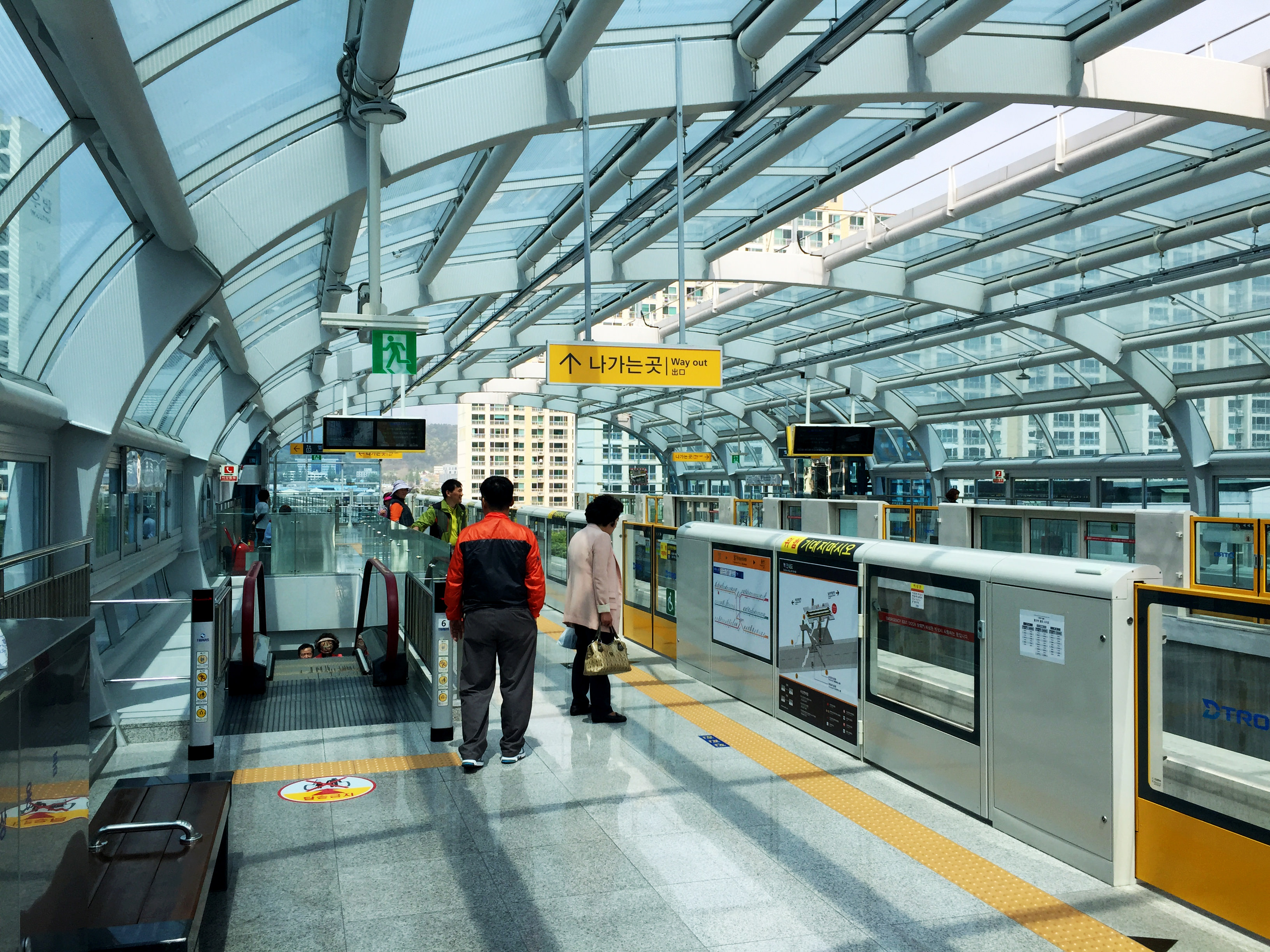
- The platforms in 2015

Korean name
- Hangul: 팔거역
- Hanja: 八莒驛
- Revised Romanization: Palgeo yeok
- McCune–Reischauer: P'algŏ yŏk

General information
- Location: Dongcheon-dong, Buk District, Daegu; South Korea
- Coordinates: 35°56′38″N 128°33′30″E
- Operator: DTRO
- Line: Daegu Metro Line 3
- Platforms: 2
- Tracks: 2

Construction
- Structure type: Overground

Other information
- Station code: 314

History
- Opened: April 23, 2015
Location

Palgeo station is a station of the Daegu Metro Line 3 in Dongcheon-dong, Buk District, Daegu, South Korea.

Preceding station	Daegu Metro	Following station
Hakjeong towards Chilgok Kyungpook National University Medical Center	Line 3	Dongcheon towards Yongji
