= Hakjeong station =

Station of the Daegu Metro

313 학정 Hakjeong
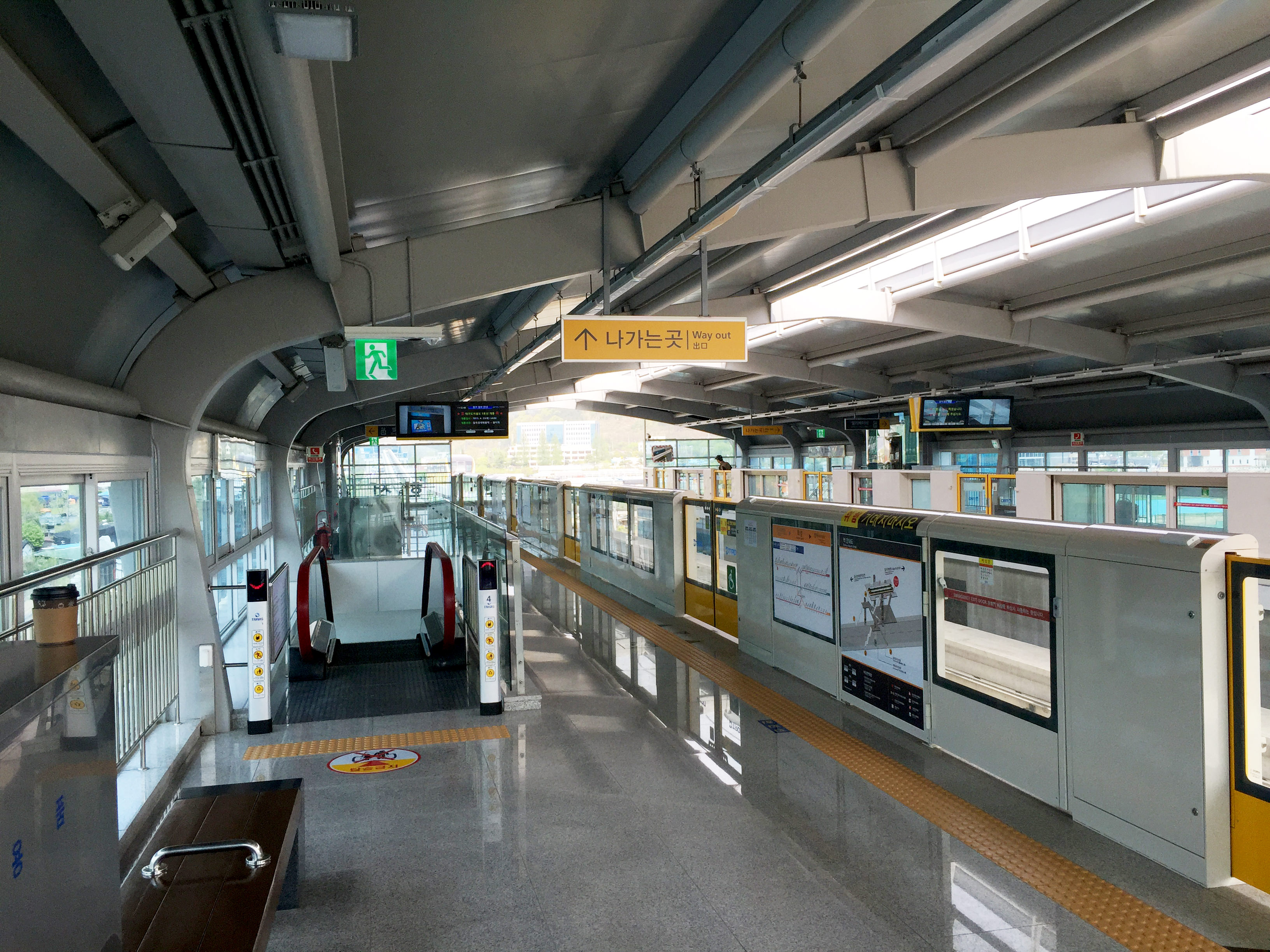

Korean name
- Hangul: 학정역
- Hanja: 鶴亭驛
- Revised Romanization: Hakjeong yeok
- McCune–Reischauer: Hakchŏng yŏk

General information
- Location: Hakjeong-dong, Buk District, Daegu; South Korea
- Coordinates: 35°57′05″N 128°33′33″E
- Operator: DTRO
- Line: Line 3
- Platforms: 2
- Tracks: 2

Construction
- Structure type: Overground

Other information
- Station code: 313

History
- Opened: April 23, 2015

Services
Preceding station	Daegu Metro	Following station
Chilgok Kyungpook National University Medical Center Terminus	Line 3	Palgeo towards Yongji
Location

Hakjeong Station is a station of the Daegu Metro Line 3 in Hakjeong-dong, Buk District, Daegu, South Korea.

== Station layout ==
L2; Platforms	Side platform, doors will open on the right
L2; Platforms	Westbound	← Line 3 toward Chilgok Kyungpook Nat'l Univ. Medical Center (Terminus)
L2; Platforms	Eastbound	→ Line 3 toward Yongji (Palgeo) →
L2; Platforms	Side platform, doors will open on the right
L1	Concourse	Faregates, Ticketing Machines, Station Control
G	Street Level
