= Daegu Metro Line 3 =

Monorail line in Daegu, South Korea

Line 3
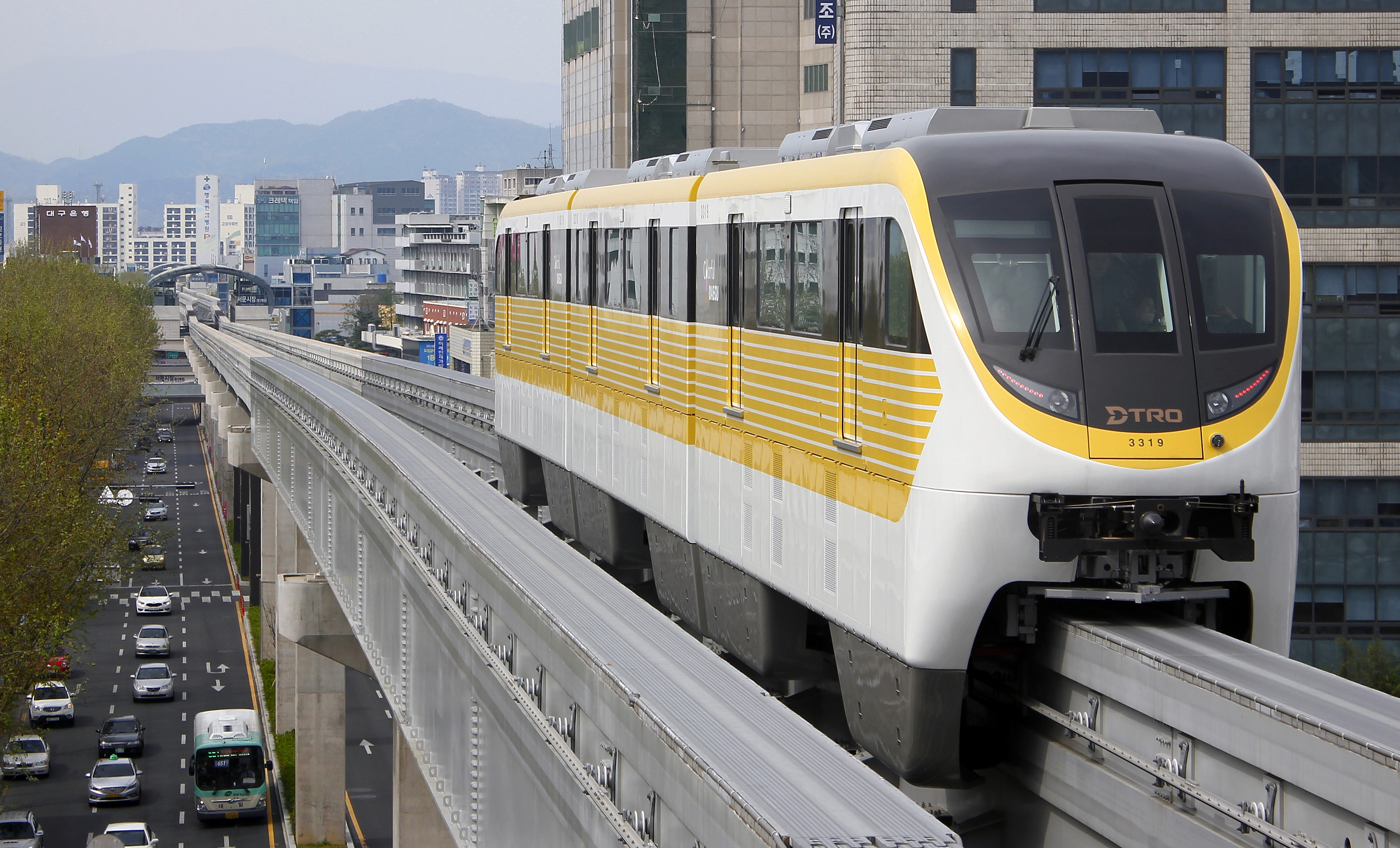

Overview
- Native name: 3호선(3號線); Sam Hoseon
- Status: Operational
- Termini: Chilgok Kyungpook Nat'l Univ. Medical Center; Yongji
- Stations: 30

Service
- Type: Straddle beam monorail
- System: Daegu Metro
- Services: 1
- Operator(s): Daegu Transportation Corporation
- Depot(s): Beommul Depot
- Rolling stock: Hitachi Rail/Woojin Industries 3000 series
- Daily ridership: 74,031 (2018)

History
- Opened: 23 April 2015

Technical
- Line length: 23.95 km (14.88 mi)
- Number of tracks: 2
- Electrification: 1,500 V DC third rail
- Operating speed: 70 km/h (43 mph)

Daegu Metro Line 3 is the third line in the Daegu Metro rapid transit system in Daegu, South Korea. It is operated by the Daegu Transit Corporation. Daegu Metro Line 3 is a monorail line, and Hitachi Monorail was contracted for the supply of monorail, track switches and signalling system. It is Korea's first straddle-type monorail system.

== Rolling stock ==
Line 3's rolling stock are referred to as 3000-series. There are 28 3-car sets or 84 cars in total. It is based on the standard Hitachi Monorail system. Hitachi Rail built the prototype car set with remaining 27 sets built by Woojin Industrial Systems.

== Stations ==
All stations in the Daegu Metro have indoors spaces where people can rest because the train is outdoors. Depending on the season, air conditioning or heating is in operation.

Station number	Station name English	Station name Hangul	Station name Hanja	Transfer	Distance in km	Total distance	Location
312	Chilgok Kyungpook Nat'l Univ. Medical Center	칠곡경대병원	漆谷慶大病院		0.0	0.0	Buk
313	Hakjeong	학정	鶴亭		0.8	0.8	Buk
314	Palgeo (NAQS–KOSTAT) (Note: National Agricultural Products Quality Management Service–Korea National Statistical Office)	팔거 (국립농관원·통계청)	八居 (國立農質院·統計廳)		0.8	1.6	Buk
315	Dongcheon	동천	東川		0.7	2.3	Buk
316	Chilgok-Unam	칠곡운암	漆谷雲岩		0.8	3.1	Buk
317	Guam (Taegu Science Univ. ·Daegu Health College)	구암 (과학대·보건대입구)	鳩岩 (科學大·保健大入口)		0.7	3.8	Buk
318	Taejeon	태전	太田		0.7	4.5	Buk
319	Maecheon	매천	梅川		0.9	5.4	Buk
320	Maecheon Market	매천시장	梅川市場		1.1	6.5	Buk
321	Paldal	팔달	八達		0.8	7.3	Buk
322	Gongdan	공단	工團		0.9	8.2	Buk
323	Manpyeong	만평	萬坪		0.8	9.0	Buk
324	Paldal Market	팔달시장	八達市場		0.6	9.6	Seo
325	Wondae	원대	院岱		0.6	10.2	Seo
326	Buk-gu Office	북구청	北區廳		0.8	11.0	Seo
327	Dalseong Park	달성공원	達城公園		1.0	12.0	Jung
328	Seomun Market (Dongsan Hospital)	서문시장 (동산병원)	西門市場 (東山病院)		0.7	12.7	Jung
329	Cheongna Hill	청라언덕	靑蘿언덕	Daegu Metro Line 2	0.7	13.4	Jung
330	Namsan (Gyemyeongnegeori)	남산 (계명네거리)	南山 (啓明네거리)		0.8	14.2	Jung
331	Myeongdeok (2.28 Democracy Movement Hall) (Note: February 28th Democracy Movement Hall)	명덕 (2·28민주운동기념회관)	明德 (2·28民主運動紀念會館)	Daegu Metro Line 1	0.6	14.8	Jung
332	Geondeulbawi	건들바위	건들바위		0.9	15.7	Nam
333	Daebonggyo	대봉교	大鳳橋		0.7	16.4	Nam
334	Suseong Market	수성시장	壽城市場		0.8	17.2	Suseong
335	Suseong-gu Stadium	수성구민운동장	壽城區民運動場		1.0	18.2	Suseong
336	Children's World	어린이회관	어린이會館		0.8	19.0	Suseong
337	Hwanggeum	황금	黃金		0.7	19.7	Suseong
338	Suseongmot (TBC) (Note: Taegu Broadcasting Corporation)	수성못 (TBC)	壽城못 (大邱放送)		0.8	20.5	Suseong
339	Jisan	지산	池山		1.2	21.7	Suseong
340	Beommul	범물	凡勿		0.8	22.5	Suseong
341	Yongji	용지	龍池		0.7	23.2	Suseong

== See also ==
- Daegu Metro Line 1
- Daegu Metro Line 2
