= Taejeon station =

Station of the Daegu Metro

318 태전 Taejeon
- Taejeon Station exterior in 2015

Korean name
- Hangul: 태전역
- Hanja: 太田驛
- Revised Romanization: Taejeon yeok
- McCune–Reischauer: T'aechŏn yŏk

General information
- Location: Taejeon-dong, Buk District, Daegu; South Korea
- Coordinates: 35°55′11″N 128°32′51″E
- Operator: DTRO
- Line: Daegu Metro Line 3
- Platforms: 2
- Tracks: 2

Construction
- Structure type: Overground

Other information
- Station code: 318

History
- Opened: April 23, 2015

Services
Preceding station	Daegu Metro	Following station
Guam towards Chilgok Kyungpook National University Medical Center	Line 3	Maecheon towards Yongji
Location

Taejeon Station is a station of the Daegu Metro Line 3 in Taejeon-dong, Buk District, Daegu, South Korea.
