= 太田駅 =

太田駅 or 太田驛 may refer to:

- Ōta Station (disambiguation)
  - Ōta Station (Gunma)
  - Ōta Station (Kagawa)
- Taejeon station
