= Namsan Station =

Namsan Station may refer to:

- Namsan Station (Busan)
- Namsan Station (Kangwon Line)
- Namsan Station (Gimcheon)
- Namsan Station (Daegu)
