= Seobu Library =

Public library in Seo-gu, Daegu, South Korea

- 서부도서관
- 35.872456844575765°N 128.55762771171018°E
- Location: Seo-gu, South Korea
- Established: 1992

Other information
- Website: https://library.daegu.go.kr/seobu/index.do

- Seobu Library
- Hangul: 대구광역시립서부도서관
- Hanja: 大邱廣域市立西部圖書館
- Revised Romanization: Daegu gwangyeoksirib seobu doseogwan
- McCune–Reischauer: Taegu-kwangyŏksirip sŏbu tosŏgwan

Seobu Library is a public library in Seo-gu, Daegu, South Korea. The total number of books in the library is 247,059, and that of paper is 6,721. The library opened on 23 December 1992.
