= Hwanggeum-dong, Daegu =

Hwanggeum-dong
- Country: South Korea

Korean name
- Hangul: 황금동
- Hanja: 黃金洞
- RR: Hwanggeum-dong
- MR: Hwanggŭm-dong

Hwanggeum-dong (Korean: 황금동) is a ward of Suseong District, Daegu, South Korea. While it is referred to locally as one district, it is in fact administered as two wards, nearly divided by Beomeo Park. Daegu National Museum is in Hwanggeum 1 (il) dong. Hwanggeum Shijang, a market area and major landmark, is in the far northeastern corner of Hwanggeum 2 (i) dong, near the border of Beomeo-dong.
