= Ōta Station =

Ōta Station is the name of two train stations in Japan.

- Ōta Station (Gunma) - (太田駅) in Ota, Gunma Prefecture
- Ōta Station (Kagawa) - (太田駅) in Takamatsu, Kagawa Prefecture
