= Jung District, Daegu =

District of Daegu, South Korea

Coordinates: 35°52′09″N 128°36′19″E

Jung
- Autonomous District
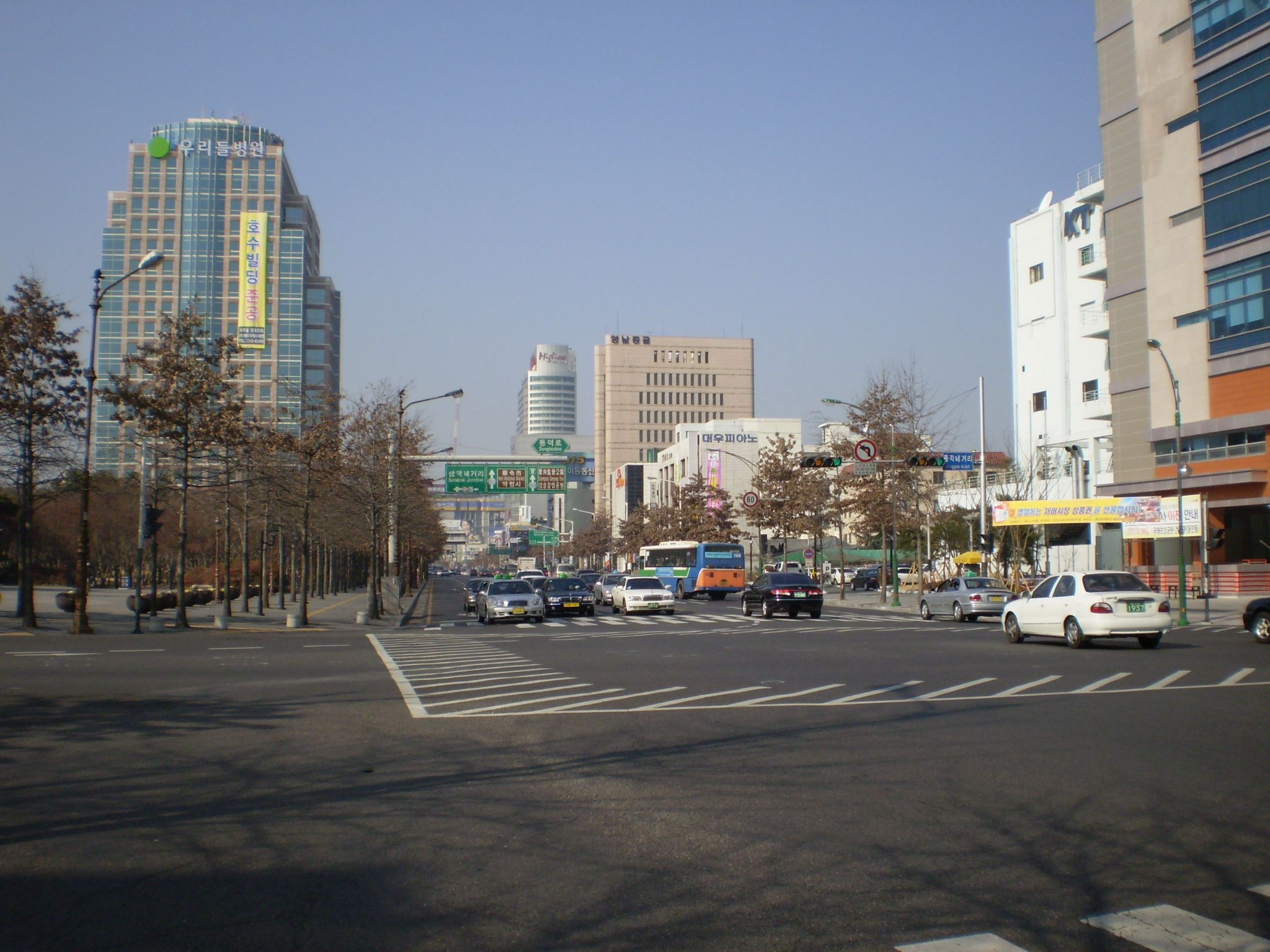

- Flag

- Country: South Korea
- Region: Yeongnam
- Provincial level: Daegu
- Administrative divisions: 13 administrative dong

Government
  - Mayor: Ryu Gyu-ha (류규하)

Area
  - Total: 7.06 km^{2} (2.73 sq mi)

Population (September 2024)
  - Total: 94,808
  - Density: 10,696/km^{2} (27,700/sq mi)
  - Dialect: Gyeongsang
- Website: Jung District Office

Korean name
- Hangul: 중구
- Hanja: 中區
- RR: Jung-gu
- MR: Chung-gu

Administrative divisions

Jung District (Korean: 중구) is a gu, or district, covering the downtown area of Daegu, South Korea. It borders most of the other districts of Daegu, including Nam-gu to the south, Seo-gu to the west, Buk-gu to the north, and Dong District and Suseong District to the east. The northern border is formed by the Gyeongbu Line railroad, and the eastern border by the Sincheon stream.

Jung-gu is at the nexus of Daegu Subway Line 1 and Daegu Subway Line 2. Daegu Subway Line 3 will also pass through the district when it is completed.

== History ==
Much of Jung-gu once lay within the old confines of Daegu Castle, which at one time comprised the entire town of Daegu. A small part of the castle wall is preserved in Dalseong Park. Many historical incidents in the history of Daegu took place in the district, including the recent Daegu subway fire and the 2.28 Daegu Democracy Movement calling for the end of the autocratic Rhee regime in 1960. The district was formally established in 1963, with the introduction of the gu system.

== Land use, demographics ==
The land of Jung-gu is almost entirely developed, with only 16% greenspace remaining. Sangdeok-dong (상덕동; 尙德洞), a legal-status neighborhood which belongs to Seongnae 1 (il)-dong, an administrative neighborhood, the narrowest legal-status dong in South Korea, with an area of 2,971m2 (0.003km2). Sangdeok-dong (상덕동; 尙德洞), a legal-status neighborhood which belongs to Seongnae 1 (il)-dong, an administrative neighborhood, the narrowest legal-status dong in South Korea, with an area of 2,971 m^{2} (0.003 km^{2}).

The population of Jung-gu fell steadily after peaking at 218,900 in 1980, as outlying residential districts expanded and residences were replaced by businesses. In the mid-2000s this trend appeared to stabilize, with the 2005 population rising slightly over 2004.

== Economy and shopping ==
The district has been the chief shopping center of Daegu throughout recorded history, beginning with the Yangnyeongsi and Seomun markets, both of which are still in operation. Chilseong Market, a major center of hardware and furniture sales, is also located in Jung-gu. Most of the city's department stores are located in or near the district, as are a vast number of smaller shops. Daebong Library, the municipal library that was located here. It opened on May 5, 1971 and has 162,929 books and 931 papers as of 2011, and the operation ended on September 30, 2018, and on December 19, 2018, it moved to Dong District, Daegu and renamed the Daegu Metropolitan Memorial Library for 2.28 Students' Movement.
