= Seo District, Daegu =

District of Daegu, South Korea

Coordinates: 35.87°N 128.56°E

Seo
- Autonomous District
- Flag

- Country: South Korea
- Region: Yeongnam
- Provincial level: Daegu
- Administrative divisions: 17 administrative dong

Government
  - Mayor: Kwon Oh-Sang (권오상)

Area
  - Total: 17.33 km^{2} (6.69 sq mi)

Population (September 2024)
  - Total: 163,463
  - Density: 9,619/km^{2} (24,910/sq mi)
  - Dialect: Gyeongsang
- Website: Seo District Office

Korean name
- Hangul: 서구
- Hanja: 西區
- RR: Seo-gu
- MR: Sŏ-gu

Administrative divisions

Seo District (Korean: 서구) is a gu, or district, in western Daegu, South Korea. A major transportation nexus, it is transected by the Gyeongbu, Guma, and Jungang Expressways. It is also connected to the downtown region and to Dalseong County by Daegu Subway Line 2. The Gyeongbu Line railroad also passes through Seo-gu, but no major stations are located there.

Seo-gu stands at the western edge of Daegu's urbanized region. It is bounded by the downtown Jung District to the east, by Dalseo District to the south and Buk District to the north, and by the largely rural area of Dalseong County to the west. Most of the western third of Seo-gu is taken up by the rural Sangjungi-dong precinct.

== Twin towns – sister cities ==
Seo District is twinned with:

- Bacolod, Philippines
- Angeles City, Philippines
- Hexi (Tianjin), China
- Keqiao (Shaoxing), China

== Notable people from Seo District ==
- Kim Tae-hyung known by his stage name V, actor, singer-songwriter, dancer, record producer, composer and member of one of the most successful boyband and best selling artist ever in South Korea, BTS is native of Seo District, Daegu.

== See also ==
- Seobu Library
