= Suseong District =

District of Daegu, South Korea

Suseong
- Autonomous District
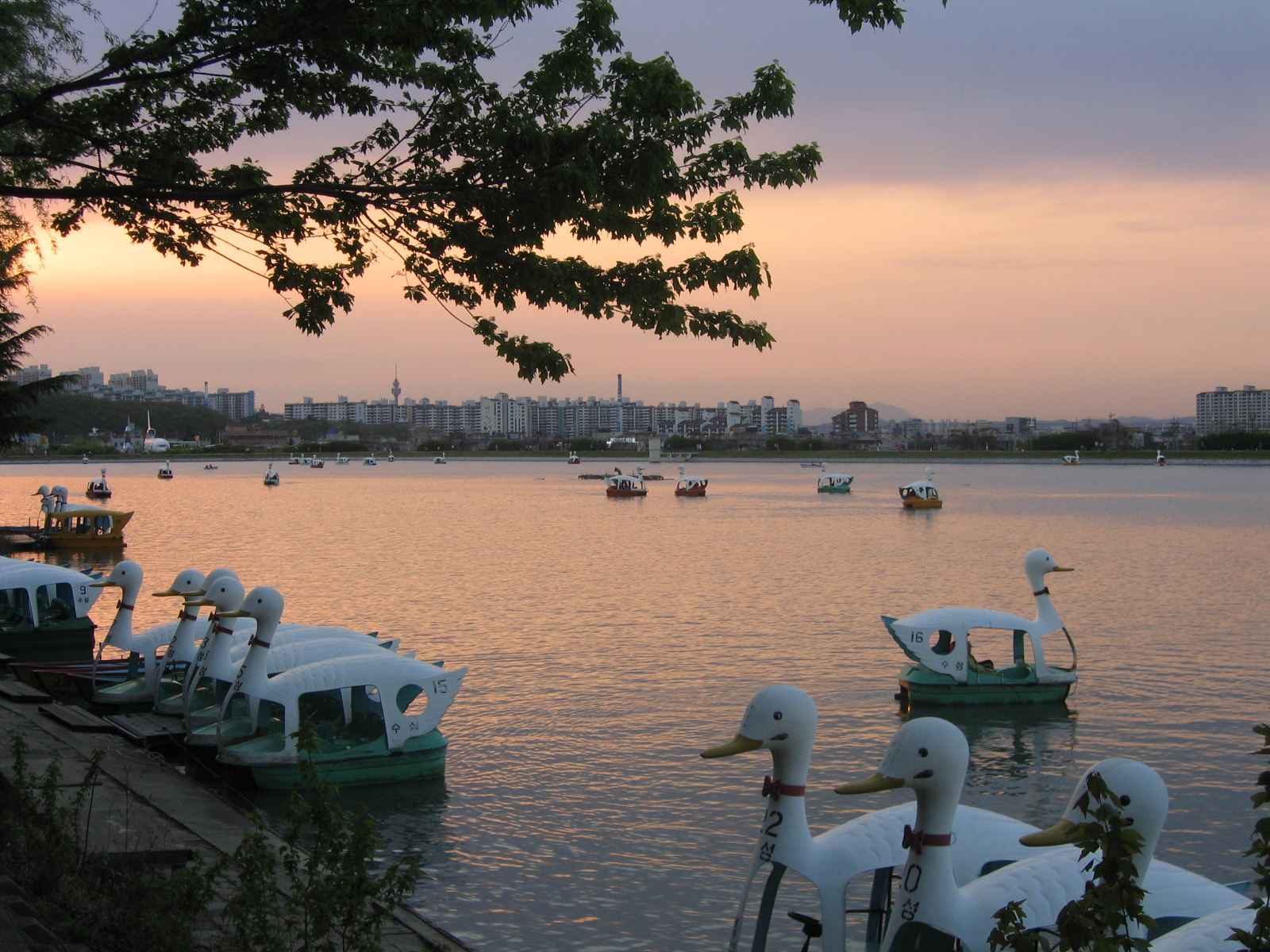
- Sunset on Suseong Lake, April 24, 2005.

- Flag

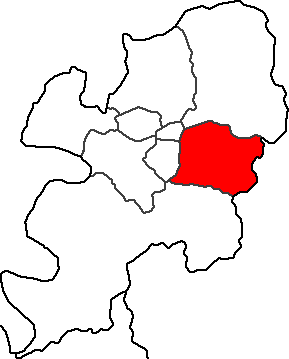
- Coordinates: 35°51′21″N 128°37′50″E
- Country: South Korea
- Region: Yeongnam
- Provincial level: Daegu
- Administrative divisions: 23 administrative dong

Government
  - Mayor: Kim Dae-gwon (김대권)

Area
  - Total: 76.54 km^{2} (29.55 sq mi)

Population (September 2024)
  - Total: 407,570
  - Density: 5,336/km^{2} (13,820/sq mi)
  - Dialect: Gyeongsang
- Website: www.suseong.daegu.kr

Korean name
- Hangul: 수성구
- Hanja: 壽城區
- RR: Suseong-gu
- MR: Susŏng-gu

Administrative divisions

Suseong District (Korean: 수성구) is a gu (district) in southeastern Daegu, South Korea. It is one of the most prosperous and high-density areas of Daegu, the site of the city's most extensive hagwon district, so it's called "Gangnam of Daegu". The population of this district consists of those who have careers such as doctors, professors, judges and other high valued careers in Korea. Because of this, it is known for expensive housing and schools compared to other districts in Daegu.

Suseong District shares its eastern border with Gyeongsan, and looks across the Sincheon stream at Nam-gu and Jung-gu towards the city center. To the north it meets Dong-gu and to the south it faces Dalseong County across the ridgeline of Yongjibong.

Attractions in the district include Yongjibong and Suseong Lake, as well as the Sincheon riverside park. The district enjoys close connections to both downtown Daegu and neighboring Gyeongsan.

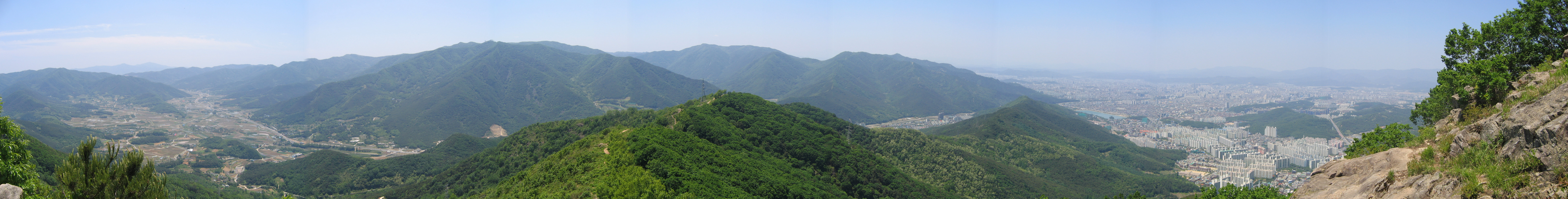
Panorama of Gachang and Suseong from 2005 at Yongjibong

== Famous place ==
- Daegu National Museum

== Sports Facilities & Press ==
- Daegu Stadium
- Daegu Samsung Lions Park
- Daegu Munhwa Broadcasting Corporation (Daegu MBC)
- Taegu Broadcasting Corporation (TBC)

== Education ==
- Dukwon High School (1978)
- Daegu Science High School
- Daegu Agricultural Meister High School
- Kyeongbuk High School
- Gyeongsin High School
