= Yongji station =

Station of the Daegu Metro

341 용지 Yongji
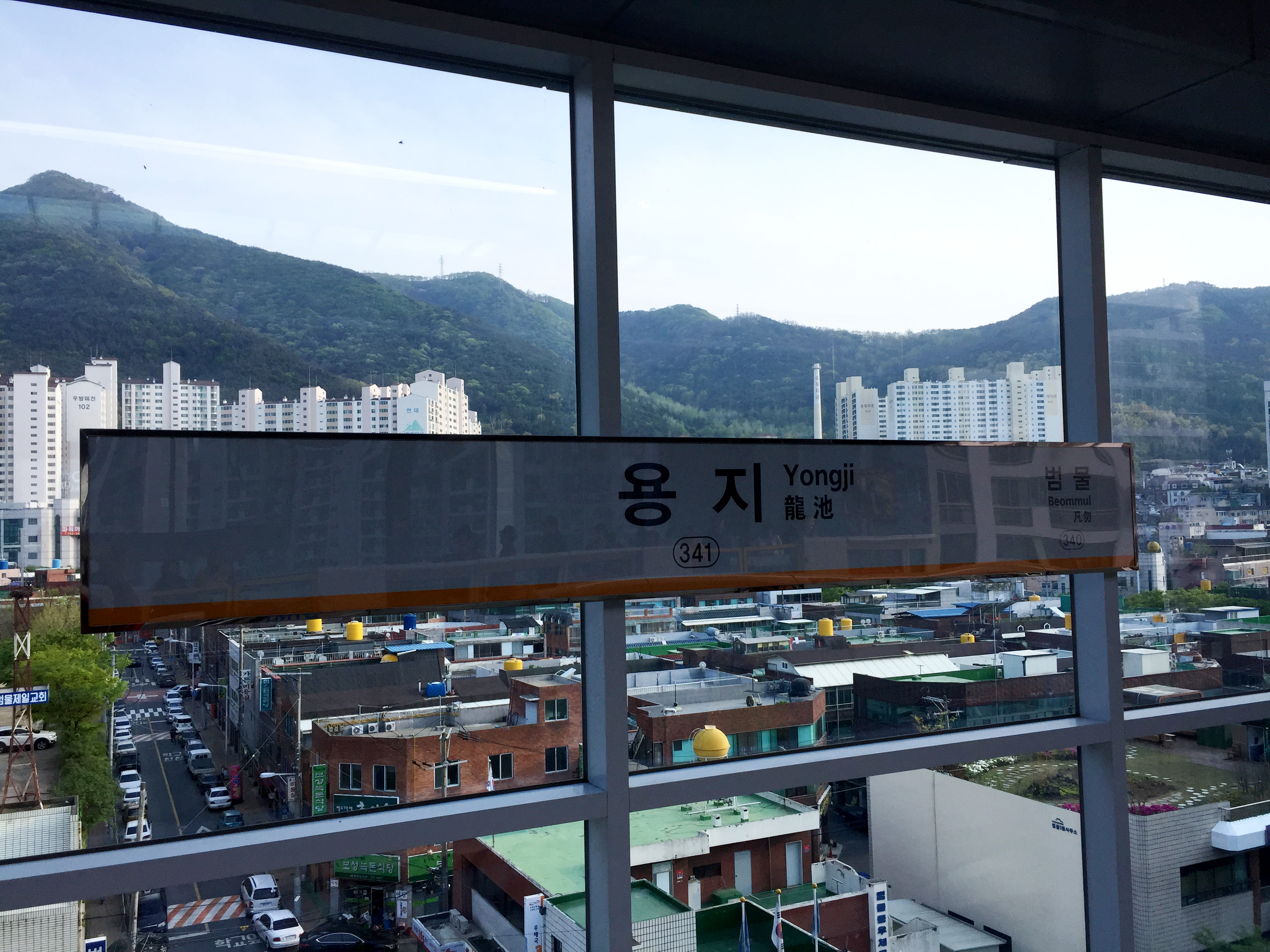

Korean name
- Hangul: 용지역
- Hanja: 龍池驛
- Revised Romanization: Yongji yeok
- McCune–Reischauer: Yongchi yŏk

General information
- Location: Beommul-dong, Suseong District, Daegu; South Korea
- Coordinates: 35°49′06″N 128°38′47″E
- Operator: DTRO
- Line: Line 3
- Platforms: 2
- Tracks: 2

Construction
- Structure type: Overground

Other information
- Station code: 341

History
- Opened: April 23, 2015

Services
Preceding station	Daegu Metro	Following station
Beommul towards Chilgok Kyungpook National University Medical Center	Line 3	Terminus
Location

Yongji Station is a station on the Daegu Metro Line 3 in Beommul-dong, Suseong District, Daegu, South Korea.

Beommul Depot located across from Beommul Silver Welfare Center is connected by an elevated track section from Yongji Station.

== Station layout ==
Station exterior

L2; Platforms	Side platform, doors will open on the right
L2; Platforms	Westbound	← Line 3 toward Chilgok Kyungpook Nat'l Univ. Medical Center (Beommul)
L2; Platforms	Eastbound	→ Line 3 Alighting Passengers Only →
L2; Platforms	Side platform, doors will open on the right
L1	Concourse	Faregates, Ticketing Machines, Station Control
G	Street Level	Exits
