= Chilgok Kyungpook National University Medical Center station =

Station of the Daegu Metro in South Korea

312 칠곡경대병원 Chilgok Kyungpook Nat'l Univ. Medical Center

Korean name
- Hangul: 칠곡경대병원역
- Hanja: 漆谷慶大病院驛
- Revised Romanization: Chilgok Gyeongdae byeongwon yeok
- McCune–Reischauer: Ch'ilgok Kyŏngdae pyŏngwŏn yŏk

General information
- Location: Gugu-dong, Buk District, Daegu; South Korea
- Coordinates: 35.9589°N 128.5600°E
- Operator: DTRO
- Line: Line 3
- Platforms: 2
- Tracks: 2

Construction
- Structure type: Overground

Other information
- Station code: 312

History
- Opened: April 23, 2015

Services
Preceding station	Daegu Metro	Following station
Terminus	Line 3	Hakjeong towards Yongji
Location

Chilgok Kyungpook National University Medical Center Station is a station of the Daegu Metro Line 3 in Dongho-dong, Buk District, Daegu, South Korea.

== Station layout ==
L2; Platforms	Side platform, doors will open on the right
L2; Platforms	Westbound	← Line 3 Alighting Passengers Only
L2; Platforms	Eastbound	→ Line 3 toward Yongji (Hakjeong) →
L2; Platforms	Side platform, doors will open on the right
L1	Concourse	Faregates, Ticketing Machines, Station Control
G	Street Level
