= Daegu Metro =

Rapid transit railway in Daegu, South Korea

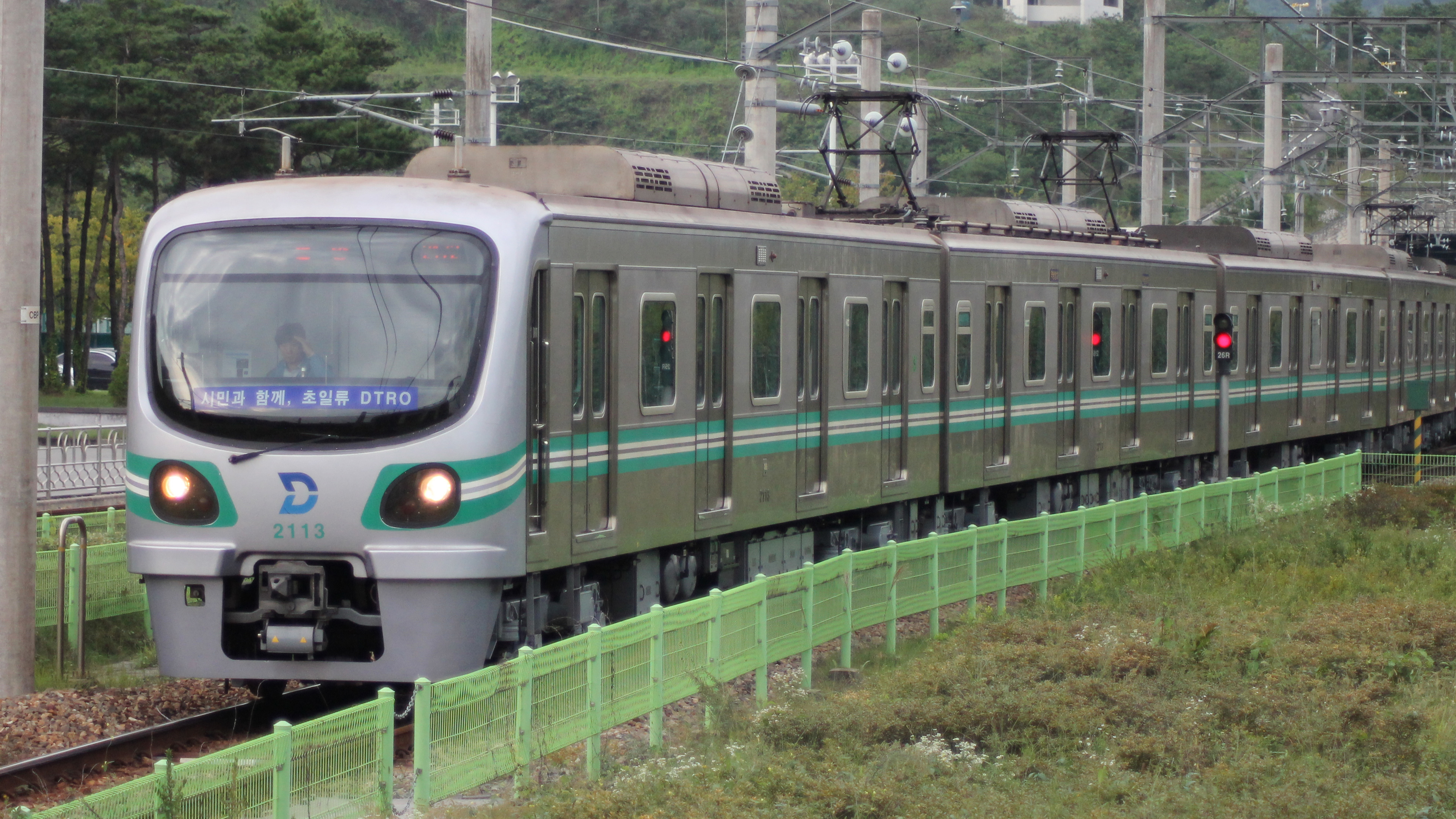
- Daegu Metro Line 2

Overview
- Owner: City of Daegu
- Locale: Daegu, South Korea
- Transit type: Rapid transit, monorail and commuter rail
- Number of lines: 2 rapid transit 1 monorail 1 commuter rail
- Number of stations: 60 (rapid transit only); 98 (incl. monorail and commuter rail)

Operation
- Began operation: 26 November 1997; 28 years ago
- Operator: Daegu Transportation Corporation
- Number of vehicles: Rapid transit train, commuter rail train and monorail

Technical
- System length: 59.8 km (37.2 mi) (rapid transit only); 145.5 km (90.4 mi) (incl. monorail and commuter rail)
- Track gauge: 1,435 mm (4 ft 8 1/2 in) (rapid transit only)
System map
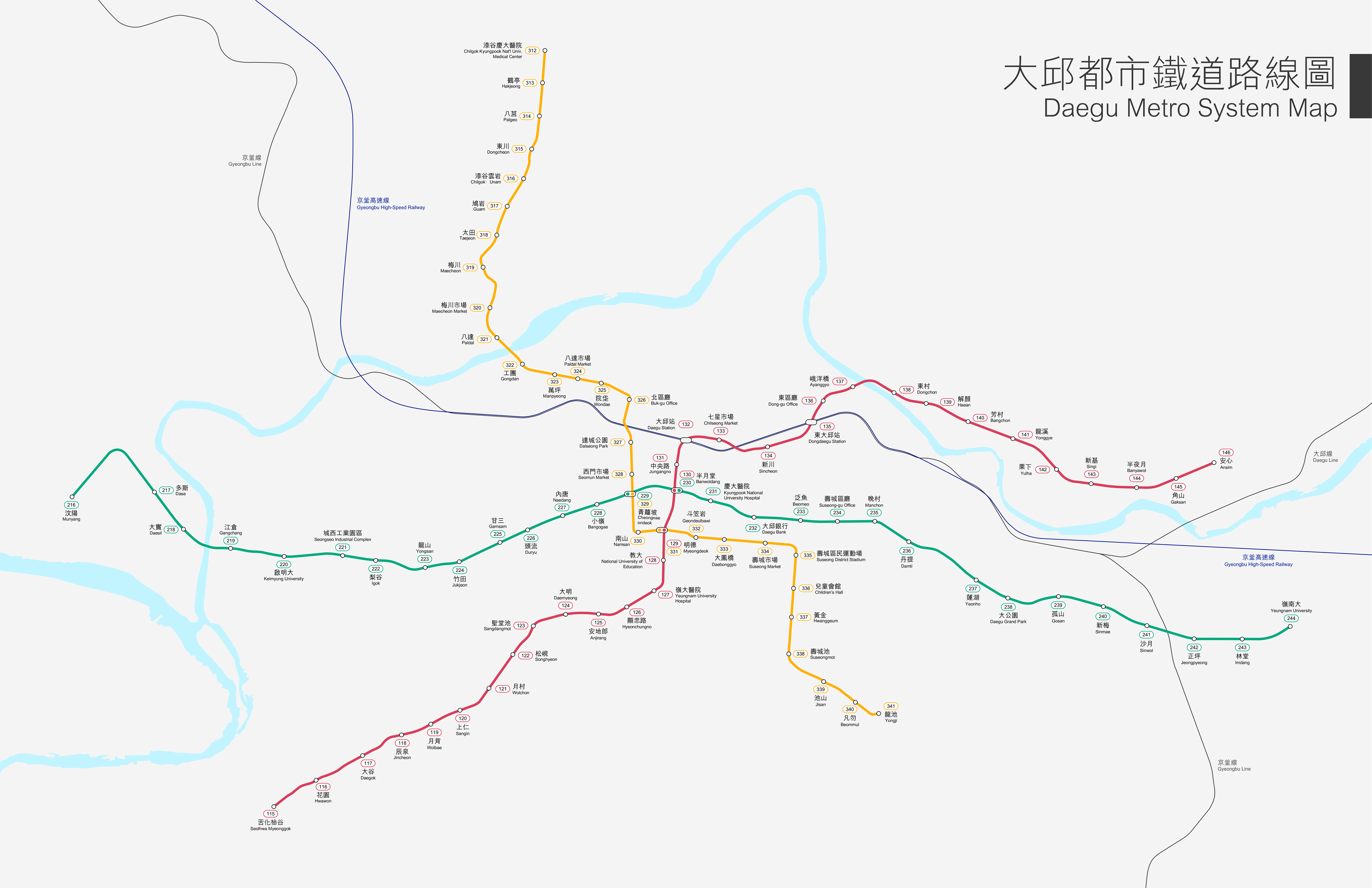

- Daegu Metro
- Hangul: 대구 도시철도
- Hanja: 大邱都市鐵道
- RR: Daegu dosi cheoldo
- MR: Taegu tosi ch'ŏlto

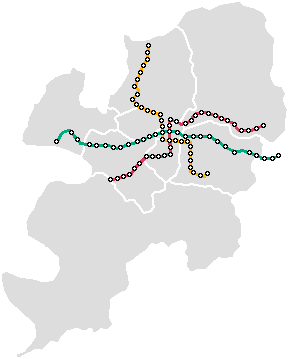
Geographical map with stations

Daegu Metro (Korean: 대구 도시철도) is a metro system that serves primarily the South Korean city of Daegu.

It encompasses the three lines operated by Daegu Transportation Corporation (DTRO)—Line 1, Line 2, and Line 3—as well as the Daegyeong Line, a commuter rail line operated by Korail. The system serves as the backbone of public transportation within the city and is gradually expanding into the surrounding Gyeongsangbuk-do region. As of 2015, the number of average daily passengers is 186,992 people for Line 1, 177,984 people for Line 2, and 69,127 people for Line 3.

== History ==
The construction of Daegu Metro was recommended to the city after the City of Daegu conducted the research in 1985 to find the ways to improve the city's transit. Following the establishment of the committee to oversee the new metro transit construction in September 1989, the study was conducted from 1989 to 1990 to evaluate whether the construction project was feasible. The guidelines for the metro transit's construction and operation was approved in January 1991. While the guideline focused on solving the traffic issues due to the overpopulation of the downtown area, it set the consequent goals of improving the city with more efficiency resulting from shorter commuting times, cleaner environment with reduced auto traffic and energy expense, larger outreach to bring the transit to those outside the urban area, and improved transportation capacity. The Daegyeong Line opened in 2023, marking the beginning of regional rail integration into the subway system.

=== Line 1 ===
The construction of Daegu Metro Line 1 began in December 1991 and the first 10.3 km long section between Jincheon and Jungang-ro began on November 26, 1997. After the second 24.9 km (15.5 mi) long section of Line 1 between Jincheon and Ansim opened on May 2, 1998, the extension was made to Daegok towards south in May 2002. The southern extension was made from Daegok to Seolhwa in 2016, making Line 1 28.4 km (17.6 mi) long with 32 stations. The most recent extension was made in December 2024 from Ansim to Hayang, making Line 1 37.1 km (23.1 mi) long with 35 stations. The line serves its function to connect the southwestern area of the downtown to the city's east.

=== Line 2 ===
The construction of Line 2 began in December 1996 and was completed on October 18, 2005, with the 28.0 km (17.4 mi) long section between Munyang and Sawol. In June 2007, the line was extended to connect the three newly built metro stations in the neighboring city of Gyeongsan. Another construction to add the 3.3 km (2.1 mi) long section to the line from Sawol to Yeungnam University of Gyeongsan was completed in September 2012. As of now, the line is 31.4 km (19.5 mi) long with 29 stations.

=== Line 3 ===
The construction of Line 3 was completed between Gyeongbook University Hospital's Chilgok campus and Yongji on May 17, 2009. The most recent extension was made on April 23, 2015, with the entire line being 23.1 km (14.4 mi) long with 30 stations. Being operated as a light rail system with monorails, the line is also commonly referred as Sky Rail.

=== Line 4 (Future Plan) ===
The construction of Daegu Metro Line 4 was approved and is on track to begin by 2026. Initially named the Expo Line, it was renamed to Daegu Metro Line 4 during its planning period in 2023. The line will operate via the Automated guideway transit, and aims to connect Dong-gu to the heart of Suseong District. Line 4's color will be sky blue.

=== Line 5 (Future Plan) ===
Daegu Metro Line 5 is planned to begin operation by 2032. Although the line was originally scheduled to be a tram line, the current plan aims to construct Line 5 as a monorail. Line 5 is planned to be represented by the color green.

=== Daegyeong Line ===
The Daegyeong Line is a metropolitan rail line connecting Gumi to Gyeongsan, while penetrating central Daegu. The line is operated by Korail. The line is the second metropolitan commuter line outside the Seoul Capital Area, following the Donghae Line of Busan Metro.

== Lines ==
Line Name English	Line Name Hangul	Starting Station(s)	Ending Station(s)	Stations	Total Length (km)
Daegu Metro Line 1	1호선	Seolhwa-Myeonggok	Hayang	35	37.1
Daegu Metro Line 2	2호선	Munyang	Yeungnam Univ.	29	31.4
Daegu Metro Line 3	3호선	Chilgok Kyungpook Nat'l Univ. Medical Center	Yongji	30	23.9
	4호선	Suseong District Stadium	Esiapolis	12	12.5
	5호선	TBD	TBD	TBD	36
Daegyeong Line	대경선	Gumi	Gyeongsan	8	61.8

== Fare ==
For transit card users, the fare is 1,500 won for an adult, 850 won for teens, and 450 won for children. When using pre-paid tokens, the fare is 1,700 won for adults and teens, and 500 won for children.

== Rolling stock ==
Daegu Metro lines are segregated, each with its own distinct vehicles. Lines 1 and 2 use the same railway technology (rapid transit), while Line 3 uses an entirely different system (monorail).

Line	Manufacturer (country of origin)	Model	Type	No. car sets ( No. of cars)
Line 1	Hanjin Heavy Industries (Hanjin Transportation) (South Korea)	1000-series	metro cars	63 (216)
Line 2	Hyundai Rotem (South Korea)	2000-series	metro cars	30 (180)
Line 3	Hitachi Transportation Systems Korea (Japan / South Korea); Woojin Industrial System Company Limited (South Korea)	3000-series	straddle-beam monorail	28 (84)

== Accidents and incidents ==
On 28 April 1995, a gas explosion occurred during the construction of Line 1 near the District of Sangin, killing 101 people near the site, including 53 students. A further 143 people were injured.

On 18 February 2003, the Daegu subway fire broke out when an arsonist set fire to a train during the rush hour, killing 192 people and injuring 148 people. The incident raised great concerns and consequent awareness in the public safety of the metro transit, prompting the city to replace the subway car's internal materials to be more flame retardant, placing the emergency gas masks and respirators within the subway cars, and improving the safety guidelines.

In December 2008, the Daegu Safety Theme Park opened with the goal to educate and raise awareness of the public metro safety to the city's people as well as visitors.

== See also ==
- Transport in South Korea
- List of metro systems
- List of monorail systems
