= Daegu Transportation Corporation =

South Korean transport company

Daegu Transportation Corporation DTRO
- Company type: Government-owned corporation
- Industry: Rapid transit
- Founded: Daegu, South Korea (20 November 1995)
- Headquarters: Sangin-dong, Dalseo District, Daegu, South Korea
- Area served: Daegu
- Number of employees: 2,064
- Parent: Daegu Metropolitan Government
- Website: www.dtro.or.kr

- Daegu Transportation Corporation
- Hangul: 대구교통공사
- Hanja: 大邱交通公社
- RR: Daegu gyotong gongsa
- MR: Taegu kyot'ong kongsa

Daegu Metropolitan Transit Corporation logo (2008~2022)

Daegu Transportation Corporation (DTRO) is a public corporation which runs the Daegu Metro Lines 1, 2 and 3 established in 1995. To 2008, it was called Daegu Metropolitan Subway Corporation.

== History ==
Daegu Metropolitan Subway Corporation was established 20 November 1995 and was renamed Daegu Metropolitan Transit Corporation 1 October 2008. It merged with Daegu Urban Railway Construction Headquarters (ko) and became Daegu Transportation Corporation on September 1 2022.

- 26 November 1997: opened Line 1 (Jincheon–Jungangno)
- 2 May 1998: opened Line 1 (Jungangno–Ansim) fully
- 10 May 2002: opened Line 1 (Daegok–Jincheon)
- 18 October 2005: opened Line 2 (Munyang–Sawol) fully
- 19 September 2012: opened Line 2 (Sawol–Yeungnam Univ.)
- 23 April 2015: opened Line 3 (Chilgok Kyungpook Nat'l Univ. Medical Center–Yongji)
