= List of Daegu Metro stations =

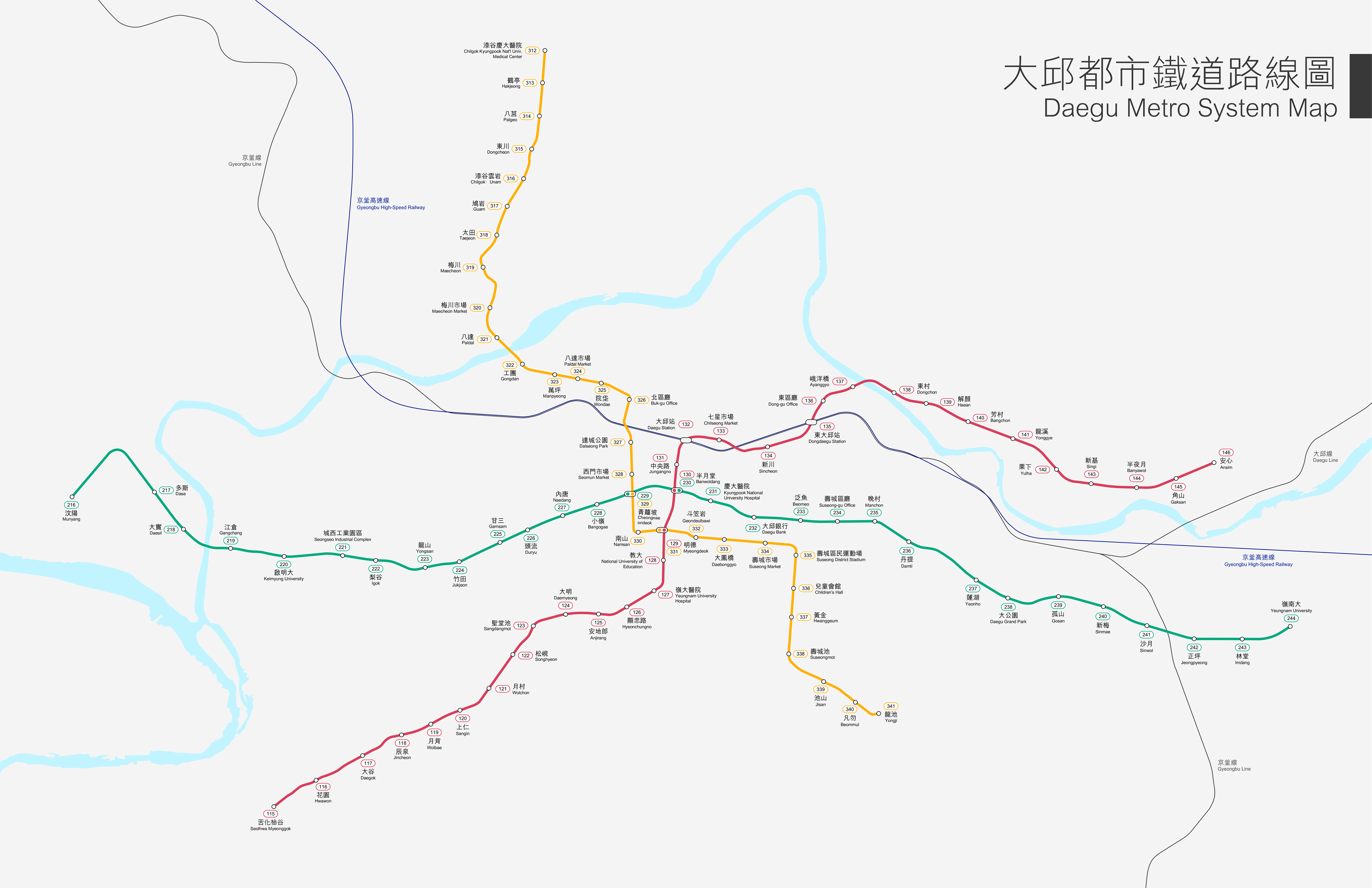
Daegu Metro lines and stations

There are currently 91 stations on the Daegu Metro network operated by the Daegu Metropolitan Transit Corporation (DTRO). The first section to open was Line 1, which began operation on November 26, 1997, between Jincheon Station and Jungangno Station.

As of 2025, the network extends approximately 92.5 km (57.5 mi) and consists of three lines: the heavy-rail Line 1 and Line 2, and the Line 3 monorail. These lines cross in central Daegu at Banwoldang Station (Lines 1 and 2), Myeongdeok Station (Lines 1 and 3), and Sinnam Station (Lines 2 and 3).

== Stations ==
=== Line 1 ===
Station Number	Station Name English	Station Name Hangul	Station Name Hanja	Transfer	Distance in km	Total Distance	Location	
115	Seolhwa-Myeonggok	설화명곡	舌化椧谷		---	0.0	Daegu	Dalseong
116	Hwawon	화원	花園		1.2		Daegu	Dalseong
117	Daegok	대곡	大谷		1.3	2.6	Daegu	Dalseo
118	Jincheon	진천	辰泉		1.0	3.5	Daegu	
119	Wolbae	월배	月背		0.8	4.3	Daegu	
120	Sangin	상인	上仁		0.7	5.0	Daegu	
121	Wolchon	월촌	月村		0.9	5.9	Daegu	
122	Songhyeon	송현	松峴		1.0	6.9	Daegu	
123	Seobu Bus Terminal	서부정류장	西部停留場		0.8	7.7	Daegu	Nam
124	Daemyeong	대명	大明		0.8	8.6	Daegu	
125	Anjirang	안지랑	안지랑		0.8	9.4	Daegu	
126	Hyeonchungno	현충로	顯忠路		0.7	10.1	Daegu	
127	Yeungnam Univ. Hospital	영대병원	嶺大病院		0.7	10.8	Daegu	
128	Nat'l Univ. of Education	교대	敎大		0.9	11.7	Daegu	
129	Myeongdeok (February 28 Democracy Movement Hall)	명덕 (2·28민주운동기념회관)	明德 (2·28民主運動紀念會館)	Daegu Metro Line 3	0.7	12.4	Daegu	Jung
130	Banwoldang	반월당	半月堂	Daegu Metro Line 2	0.8	13.2	Daegu	Jung
131	Jungangno	중앙로	中央路		0.7	13.9	Daegu	Jung
132	Daegu station	대구	大邱	Saemaul-ho services Mugunghwa-ho services	0.7	14.6	Daegu	Jung
133	Chilseong Market	칠성시장	七星市場		0.8	15.4	Daegu	Buk
134	Sincheon (Kyungpook Nat'l Univ.)	신천 (경북대입구)	新川 (慶北大入口)		1.2	16.6	Daegu	Buk
135	Dongdaegu Station	동대구	東大邱	Gyeongbu; Gyeongjeon; Gyeongbu HSR Saemaul-ho services Mugunghwa-ho services	0.9	17.5	Daegu	Dong
136	Dong-gu Office	동구청	東區廳		0.9	18.4	Daegu	Dong
137	Ayanggyo	아양교	峨洋橋		0.8	19.2	Daegu	Dong
138	Dongchon	동촌	東村		1.0	20.2	Daegu	Dong
139	Haean	해안	解安		1.0	21.2	Daegu	Dong
140	Bangchon	방촌	芳村		1.0	22.2	Daegu	Dong
141	Yonggye	용계	龍溪		1.1	23.3	Daegu	Dong
142	Yulha	율하	栗下		1.2	24.5	Daegu	Dong
143	Singi	신기	新基		1.1	25.6	Daegu	Dong
144	Banyawol	반야월	半夜月		1.0	26.6	Daegu	Dong
145	Gaksan	각산	角山		1.0	27.6	Daegu	Dong
146	Ansim (Innovation City·High-tech Medical Complex)	안심	安心		0.9	28.4	Daegu	Dong
147	Daegu Haany University Hospital	대구한의대병원	大邱韓醫大病院		1.3	29.7	Daegu	Dong
148	Buho (Kyungil University and Hosan University)	부호	釜湖		5.9	35.6	North Gyeongsang Province	Gyeongsan
149	Hayang (Daegu Catholic University)	하양	河陽	Saemaul-ho services Mugunghwa-ho services	1.5	37.1	North Gyeongsang Province	Gyeongsan

=== Line 2 ===
Station Number	Station Name English	Station Name Hangul	Station Name Hanja	Transfer	Distance in km	Total distance	Location	
216	Munyang	문양	汶陽		---	0.0	Daegu	Dalseong
217	Dasa	다사	多斯		2.9	2.9	Daegu	Dalseong
218	Daesil	대실	대실		1.0	3.9	Daegu	Dalseong
219	Gangchang	강창	江倉		1.4	5.3	Daegu	Dalseo
220	Keimyung Univ.	계명대	啓明大		1.3	6.6	Daegu	Dalseo
221	Seongseo Industrial Complex	성서산업단지	城西産業團地		1.2	7.8	Daegu	Dalseo
222	Igok	이곡	梨谷		0.8	8.6	Daegu	Dalseo
223	Yongsan (Seobu Branch Court–Prosecutor's Office)	용산 (서부법원·검찰청입구)	龍山 (西部法院·檢察廳入口)		1.3	9.9	Daegu	Dalseo
224	Jukjeon	죽전	竹田		0.9	10.8	Daegu	Dalseo
225	Gamsam	감삼	甘三		0.9	11.7	Daegu	Dalseo
226	Duryu	두류	頭流		0.8	12.5	Daegu	Dalseo
227	Naedang	내당	內唐		0.9	13.4	Daegu	Seo
228	Bangogae	반고개	반고개		0.8	14.2	Daegu	Dalseo
229	Cheongnaeondeok	청라언덕	靑蘿언덕	Daegu Metro Line 3	0.9	15.1	Daegu	Jung
230	Banwoldang	반월당	半月堂	Daegu Metro Line 1	1.0	16.1	Daegu	Jung
231	Kyungpook Nat'l Univ. Hospital	경대병원	慶大病院		0.9	17.0	Daegu	Jung
232	Daegu Bank	대구은행	大邱銀行		1.1	18.1	Daegu	Suseong
233	Beomeo	범어	泛漁		1.0	19.1	Daegu	Suseong
234	Suseong-gu Office	수성구청	壽城區廳		0.9	20.0	Daegu	Suseong
235	Manchon	만촌	晩村		0.9	20.9	Daegu	Suseong
236	Damti (Suseong College–Daeryun Middle & High School)	담티 (수성대·대륜)	담티 (壽城大·大倫)		0.9	21.8	Daegu	Suseong
237	Yeonho	연호	蓮湖		1.8	23.6	Daegu	Suseong
238	Suseong Alpha City	수성알파시티	壽城알파시티		1.0	24.6	Daegu	Suseong
239	Gosan	고산	孤山		1.2	25.8	Daegu	Suseong
240	Sinmae	신매	新梅		1.1	26.9	Daegu	Suseong
241	Sawol	사월	沙月		1.1	28.0	Daegu	Suseong
242	Jeongpyeong	정평	正坪		1.1	29.1	North Gyeongsang	Gyeongsan
243	Imdang	임당	臨堂		1.2	30.3	North Gyeongsang	Gyeongsan
244	Yeungnam Univ.	영남대	嶺南大		1.1	31.4	North Gyeongsang	Gyeongsan

=== Line 3 ===
Station number	Station name English	Station name Hangul	Station name Hanja	Transfer	Distance in km	Total distance	Location
312	Chilgok Kyungpook Nat'l Univ. Medical Center	칠곡경대병원	漆谷慶大病院		0.0	0.0	Buk
313	Hakjeong	학정	鶴亭		0.8	0.8	Buk
314	Palgeo (NAQS–KOSTAT)	팔거 (국립농관원·통계청)	八居 (國立農質院·統計廳)		0.8	1.6	Buk
315	Dongcheon	동천	東川		0.7	2.3	Buk
316	Chilgok-Unam	칠곡운암	漆谷雲岩		0.8	3.1	Buk
317	Guam (Taegu Science Univ. ·Daegu Health College)	구암 (과학대·보건대입구)	鳩岩 (科學大·保健大入口)		0.7	3.8	Buk
318	Taejeon	태전	太田		0.7	4.5	Buk
319	Maecheon	매천	梅川		0.9	5.4	Buk
320	Maecheon Market	매천시장	梅川市場		1.1	6.5	Buk
321	Paldal	팔달	八達		0.8	7.3	Buk
322	Gongdan	공단	工團		0.9	8.2	Buk
323	Manpyeong	만평	萬坪		0.8	9.0	Buk
324	Paldal Market	팔달시장	八達市場		0.6	9.6	Seo
325	Wondae	원대	院岱		0.6	10.2	Seo
326	Buk-gu Office	북구청	北區廳		0.8	11.0	Seo
327	Dalseong Park	달성공원	達城公園		1.0	12.0	Jung
328	Seomun Market (Dongsan Hospital)	서문시장 (동산병원)	西門市場 (東山病院)		0.7	12.7	Jung
329	Cheongna Hill	청라언덕	靑蘿언덕	Daegu Metro Line 2	0.7	13.4	Jung
330	Namsan (Gyemyeongnegeori)	남산 (계명네거리)	南山 (啓明네거리)		0.8	14.2	Jung
331	Myeongdeok (2.28 Democracy Movement Hall)	명덕 (2·28민주운동기념회관)	明德 (2·28民主運動紀念會館)	Daegu Metro Line 1	0.6	14.8	Jung
332	Geondeulbawi	건들바위	건들바위		0.9	15.7	Nam
333	Daebonggyo	대봉교	大鳳橋		0.7	16.4	Nam
334	Suseong Market	수성시장	壽城市場		0.8	17.2	Suseong
335	Suseong-gu Stadium	수성구민운동장	壽城區民運動場		1.0	18.2	Suseong
336	Children's World	어린이회관	어린이會館		0.8	19.0	Suseong
337	Hwanggeum	황금	黃金		0.7	19.7	Suseong
338	Suseongmot (TBC)	수성못 (TBC)	壽城못 (大邱放送)		0.8	20.5	Suseong
339	Jisan	지산	池山		1.2	21.7	Suseong
340	Beommul	범물	凡勿		0.8	22.5	Suseong
341	Yongji	용지	龍池		0.7	23.2	Suseong
