= Daegu Metro Line 1 =

Subway line in Daegu, South Korea

Line 1
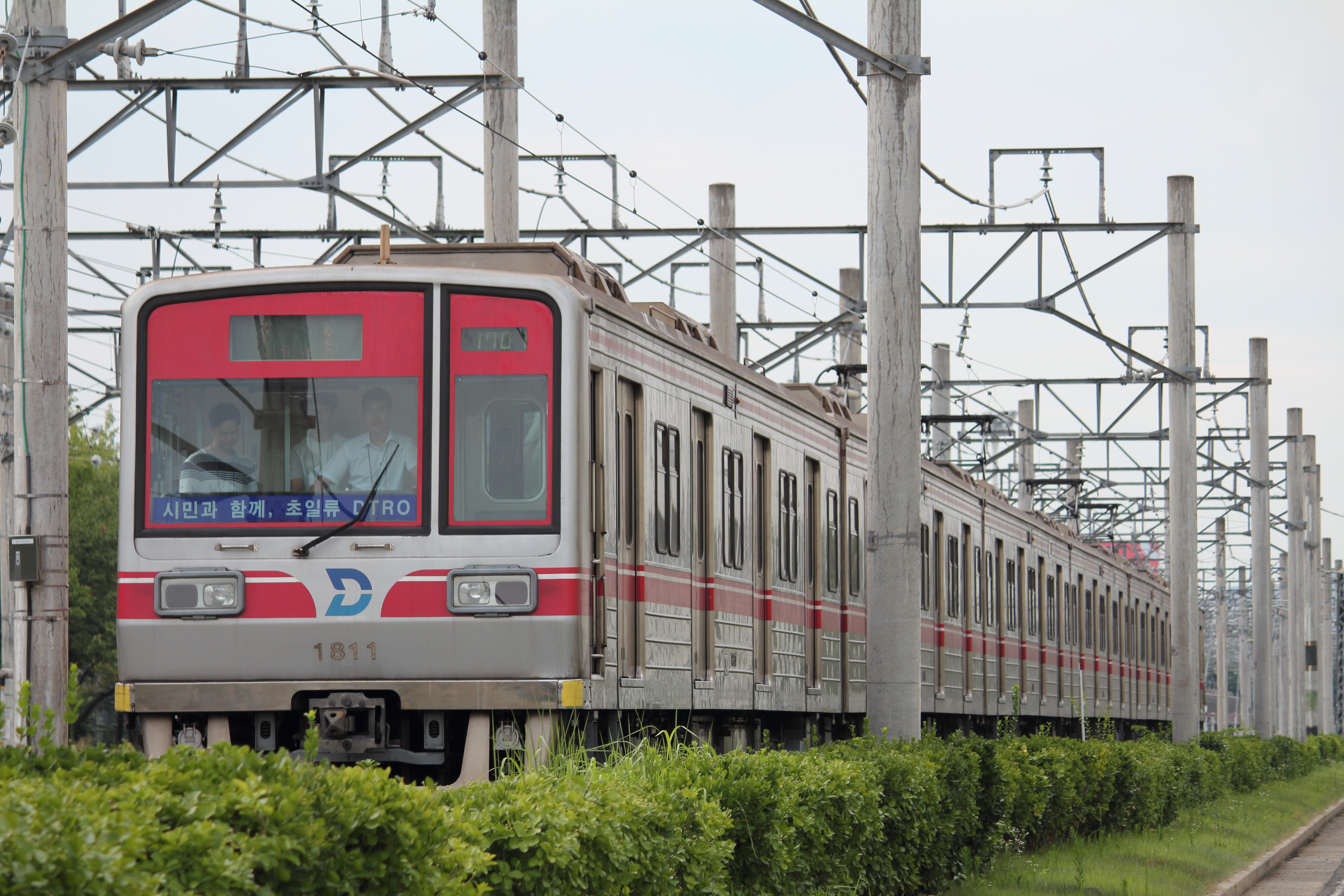

Overview
- Native name: 1호선(1號線); Il Hoseon
- Status: Operational
- Termini: Seolhwa-Myeonggok; Hayang
- Stations: 35

Service
- Type: Rapid transit
- System: Daegu Metro
- Services: 1
- Operator: Daegu Transit Corporation
- Depot: Ansim Depot
- Rolling stock: Hanjin 1000-series

History
- Opened: November 26, 1997; 28 years ago
- Last extension: 2016

Technical
- Line length: 37.1 km (23.1 mi)
- Num of tracks: 2
- Track gauge: 1,435 mm (4 ft 8 1/2 in)
- Electrification: 1500 V DC overhead
- Operating speed: 80 km/h (50 mph)

Daegu Metro Line 1 is the rapid transit line in the South Korean city of Daegu. It is operated by the Daegu Transit Corporation. The line color is ●scarlet.

The line first began running from Jincheon to Jungangno on November 26, 1997. The section from Jungnangno to Ansim was opened shortly thereafter, on May 2, 1998. The west end of the line was extended from Jincheon to Daegok, reaching its current length on May 10, 2002. However, service on the entire line was stopped for several months in 2003 following the Daegu subway fire.

Line 1's 28.4-kilometre (17.6 mi) course lies entirely within the metropolitan city of Daegu, although proposals have been made to extend it into the northern end of Gyeongsan city. As of 2011, trains run 312 times per day during the week, and 288 times on weekends and holidays. It takes 50 minutes and 30 seconds to go from one end to the other. A southwestern extension was opened on September 8, 2016.

The line was the only rapid transit line in Daegu until late-2005.

== Stations ==
The following is the list of stations from west to east. All train doors open on the right when arriving at the station (except Ansim Station).

Station; Number	Station Name; English	Station Name; Hangul	Station Name; Hanja	Transfer	Distance in km	Total; Distance	Location	
115	Seolhwa-Myeonggok	설화명곡	舌化椧谷		---	0.0	Daegu	Dalseong
116	Hwawon	화원	花園		1.2		Daegu	Dalseong
117	Daegok	대곡	大谷		1.3	2.6	Daegu	Dalseo
118	Jincheon	진천	辰泉		1.0	3.5	Daegu	Dalseo
119	Wolbae	월배	月背		0.8	4.3	Daegu	Dalseo
120	Sangin	상인	上仁		0.7	5.0	Daegu	Dalseo
121	Wolchon	월촌	月村		0.9	5.9	Daegu	Dalseo
122	Songhyeon	송현	松峴		1.0	6.9	Daegu	Dalseo
123	Seobu Bus Terminal	서부정류장	西部停留場		0.8	7.7	Daegu	Nam
124	Daemyeong	대명	大明		0.8	8.6	Daegu	Nam
125	Anjirang	안지랑	안지랑		0.8	9.4	Daegu	Nam
126	Hyeonchungno	현충로	顯忠路		0.7	10.1	Daegu	Nam
127	Yeungnam Univ. Hospital	영대병원	嶺大病院		0.7	10.8	Daegu	Nam
128	Nat'l Univ. of Education	교대	敎大		0.9	11.7	Daegu	Nam
129	Myeongdeok (February 28 Democracy Movement Hall)	명덕 (2·28민주운동기념회관)	明德 (2·28民主運動紀念會館)	Daegu Metro Line 3	0.7	12.4	Daegu	Jung
130	Banwoldang	반월당	半月堂	Daegu Metro Line 2	0.8	13.2	Daegu	Jung
131	Jungangno	중앙로	中央路		0.7	13.9	Daegu	Jung
132	Daegu Station	대구	大邱	Saemaul-ho services Mugunghwa-ho services	0.7	14.6	Daegu	Jung
133	Chilseong Market	칠성시장	七星市場		0.8	15.4	Daegu	Buk
134	Sincheon (Kyungpook Nat'l Univ.)	신천 (경북대입구)	新川 (慶北大入口)		1.2	16.6	Daegu	Buk
135	Dongdaegu Station	동대구	東大邱	Gyeongbu; Gyeongjeon; Gyeongbu HSR Saemaul-ho services Mugunghwa-ho services	0.9	17.5	Daegu	Dong
136	Dong-gu Office	동구청	東區廳		0.9	18.4	Daegu	Dong
137	Ayanggyo	아양교	峨洋橋		0.8	19.2	Daegu	Dong
138	Dongchon	동촌	東村		1.0	20.2	Daegu	Dong
139	Haean	해안	解安		1.0	21.2	Daegu	Dong
140	Bangchon	방촌	芳村		1.0	22.2	Daegu	Dong
141	Yonggye	용계	龍溪		1.1	23.3	Daegu	Dong
142	Yulha	율하	栗下		1.2	24.5	Daegu	Dong
143	Singi	신기	新基		1.1	25.6	Daegu	Dong
144	Banyawol	반야월	半夜月		1.0	26.6	Daegu	Dong
145	Gaksan	각산	角山		1.0	27.6	Daegu	Dong
146	Ansim (Innovation City·High-tech Medical Complex)	안심	安心		0.9	28.4	Daegu	Dong
147	Daegu Haany University Hospital	대구한의대병원	大邱韓醫大病院		1.3	29.7	Daegu	Dong
148	Buho (Kyungil University and Hosan University)	부호	釜湖		5.9	35.6	North Gyeongsang Province	Gyeongsan
149	Hayang (Daegu Catholic University)	하양	河陽	Saemaul-ho services Mugunghwa-ho services	1.5	37.1	North Gyeongsang Province	Gyeongsan

== See also ==
- 1995 Daegu gas explosions
- Transportation in South Korea
- Daegu Metro Line 2
