= Ayanggyo station =

Station of the Daegu Metro

Coordinates: 35°53′14″N 128°38′23″E

137 아양교 (대구국제공항입구) Ayanggyo (Daegu Int'l Airport)
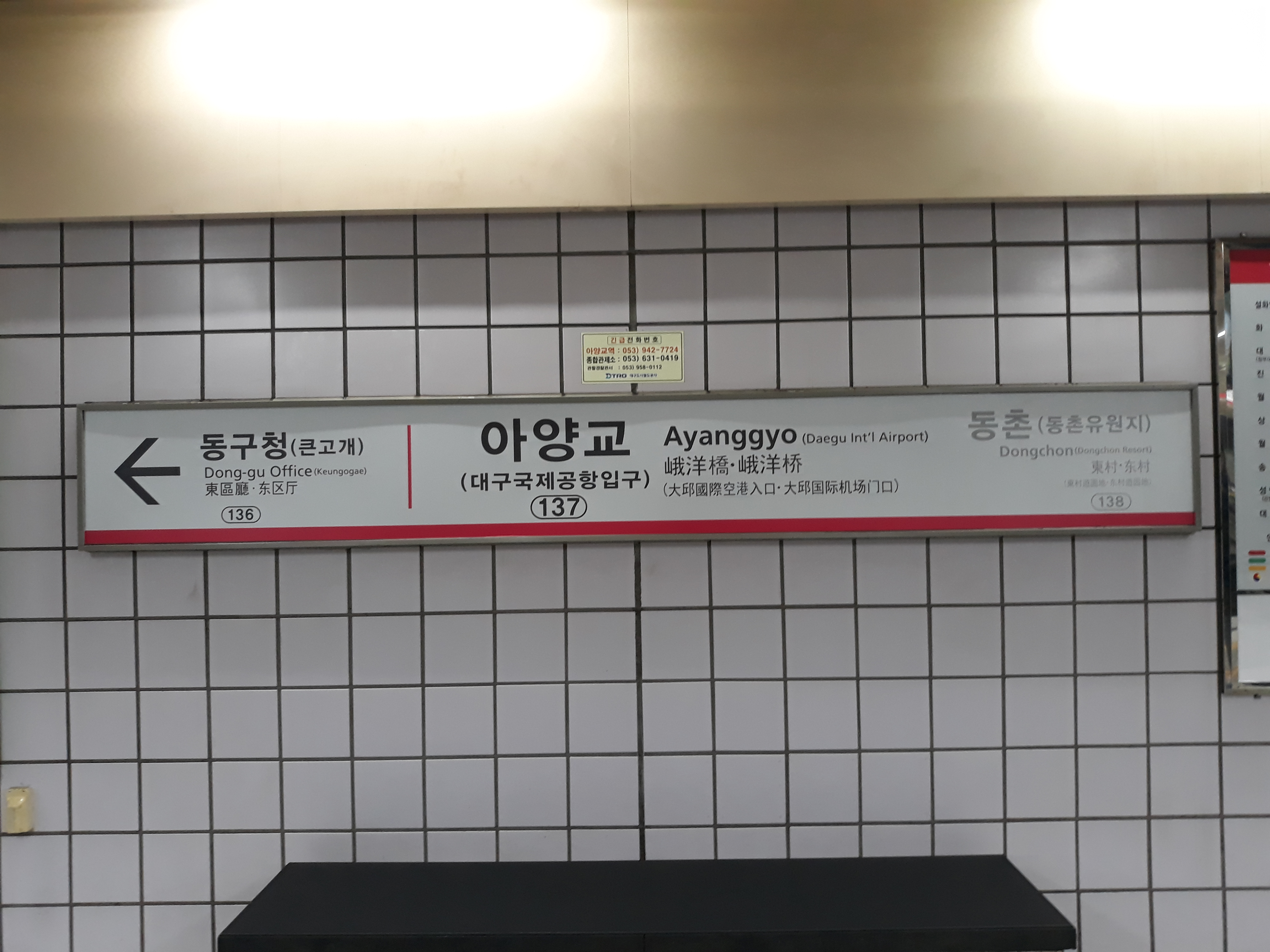
- Station nameplate

Korean name
- Hangul: 아양교역
- Hanja: 峨洋橋驛
- Revised Romanization: Ayanggyoyeok
- McCune–Reischauer: Ayanggyoyŏk

General information
- Location: Sinam-dong and Hyomok-dong, Dong District, Daegu; South Korea
- Operator: DTRO
- Line: Daegu Metro Line 1
- Platforms: 2
- Tracks: 2

Construction
- Structure type: Underground

Other information
- Station code: 137

History
- Opened: May 2, 1998
Location

Ayanggyo Station is a station of the Daegu Subway Line 1 in Sinam-dong and Hyomok-dong, Dong District, Daegu, South Korea. It is the second deepest station of the first line, located at a place crossing the Geumho River. On March 13, 2009, an elevator was established near exit 4.

| Preceding station | Daegu Metro | Following station |
|---|---|---|
| Dong-gu Office towards Seolhwa–Myeonggok | Line 1 | Dongchon towards Hayang |
