= Haean station =

Station of the Daegu Metro

Coordinates: 35°53′01″N 128°39′34″E

139 해안 (퀸벨호텔) Haean (Quinbel Hotel)
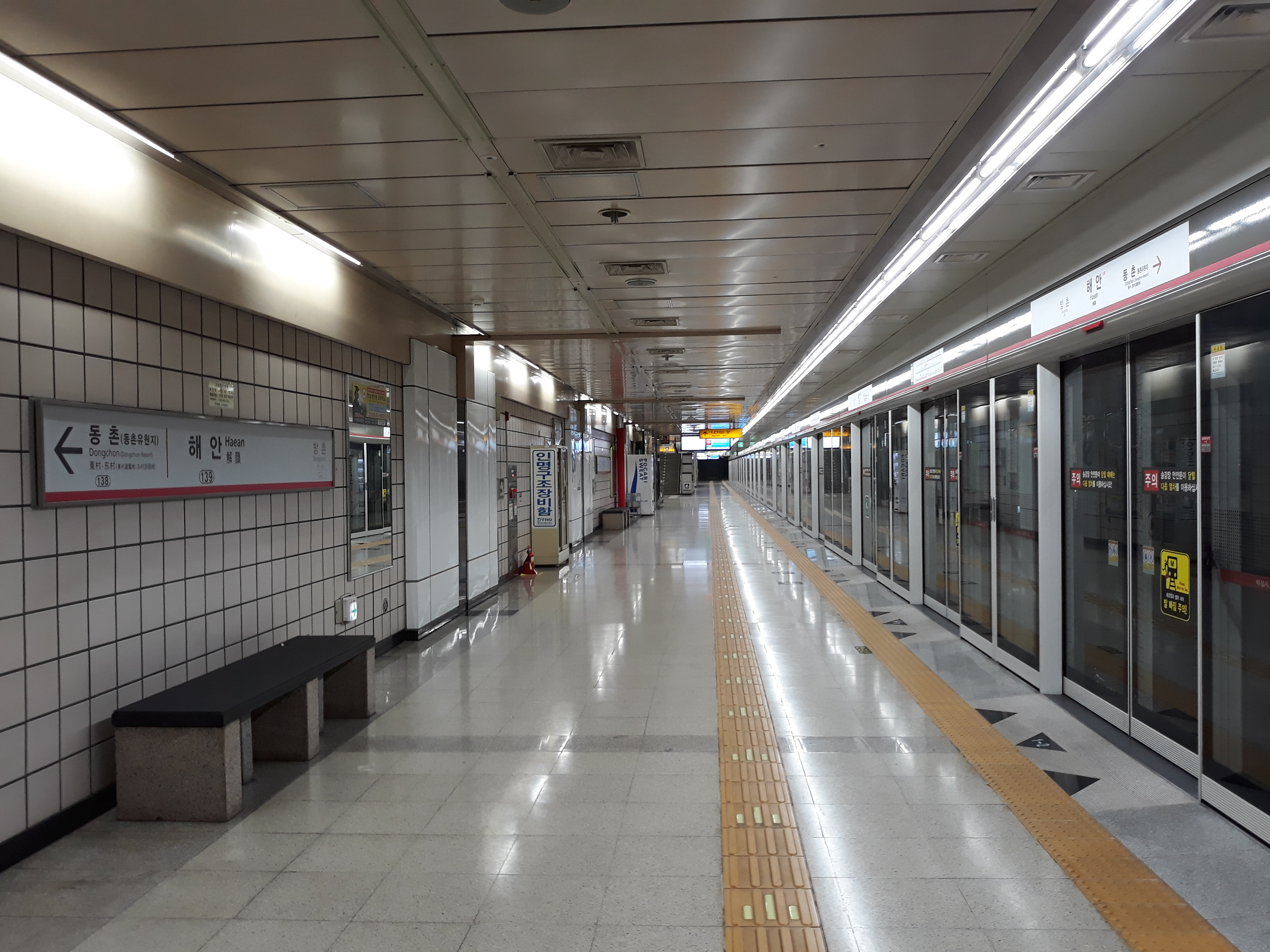
- Station platform

Korean name
- Hangul: 해안역
- Hanja: 解顔驛
- Revised Romanization: Haeannyeok
- McCune–Reischauer: Haeannyŏk

General information
- Location: Bangchon-dong, Dong District, Daegu; South Korea
- Operator: DTRO
- Line: Daegu Metro Line 1
- Platforms: 2
- Tracks: 2

Construction
- Structure type: Underground

Other information
- Station code: 139

History
- Opened: May 2, 1998
Location

Haean Station (Korean: 해안역) is a station of the Daegu Subway Line 1 in Bangchon-dong, Dong District, Daegu, South Korea.

The name of station is derived from the administrative division of Haean-myeon, which became part of Daegu in 1958.

Preceding station	Daegu Metro	Following station
Dongchon towards Seolhwa–Myeonggok	Line 1	Bangchon towards Hayang
