= Seobu Bus Terminal station =

Station of the Daegu Metro

123 서부정류장 (관문시장·대구공업대학교) Seobu Bus Terminal (Gwanmun Market·Daegu Institute of Technology)
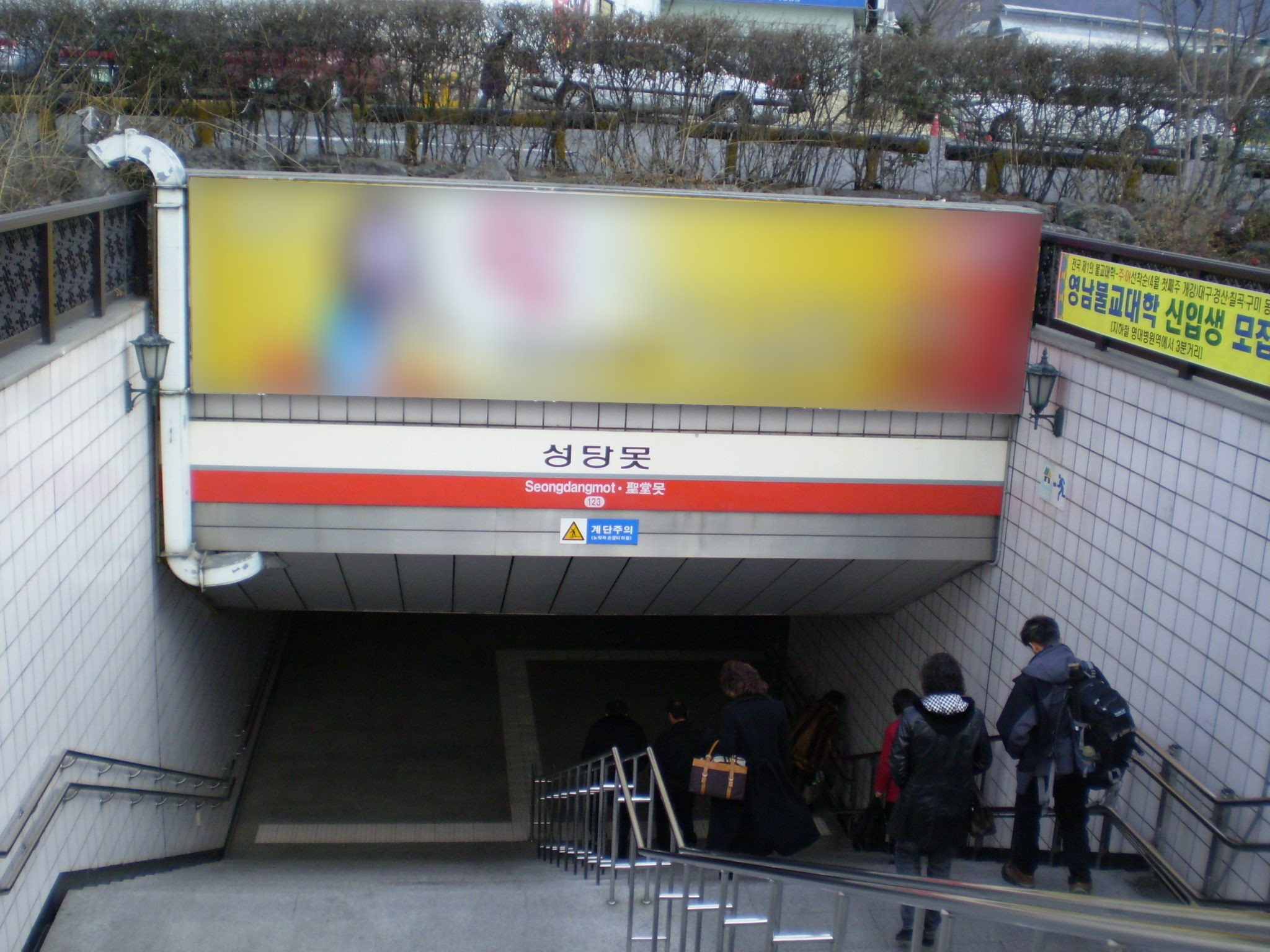

Korean name
- Hangul: 서부정류장역
- Hanja: 西部停留場驛
- Revised Romanization: Seobujeongnyujang yeok
- McCune–Reischauer: Sŏbujŏngnyujang yŏk

General information
- Location: Daemyeong-dong, Nam District / Songhyeon-dong, Dalseo District, Daegu; South Korea
- Coordinates: 35.839303°N 128.565482°E
- Operator: DTRO
- Line: Daegu Metro Line 1
- Platforms: 2
- Tracks: 2

Construction
- Structure type: Underground

Other information
- Station code: 123

History
- Opened: November 26, 1997
Location

Seobu Bus Terminal Station is a station of a city railroad of Daegu Metro Line 1 in Nam-gu Daegu, South Korea. There is a large floating population because of the marketplace and clothing business around the terminal that is connected with Seobu Bus Terminal Station. Seobu should not be confused with Seodaegu Express Bus Terminal, even though both mean West (Daegu). Be wary when booking transport tickets when using either bus terminal. The latter has an adjoining metro station (Manpyeong; yellow monorail line 3); both are located further north from Seobu.

Preceding station	Daegu Metro	Following station
Songhyeon towards Seolhwa–Myeonggok	Line 1	Daemyeong towards Hayang
