= Daemyeong station =

Station of the Daegu Metro

124 대명 Daemyeong
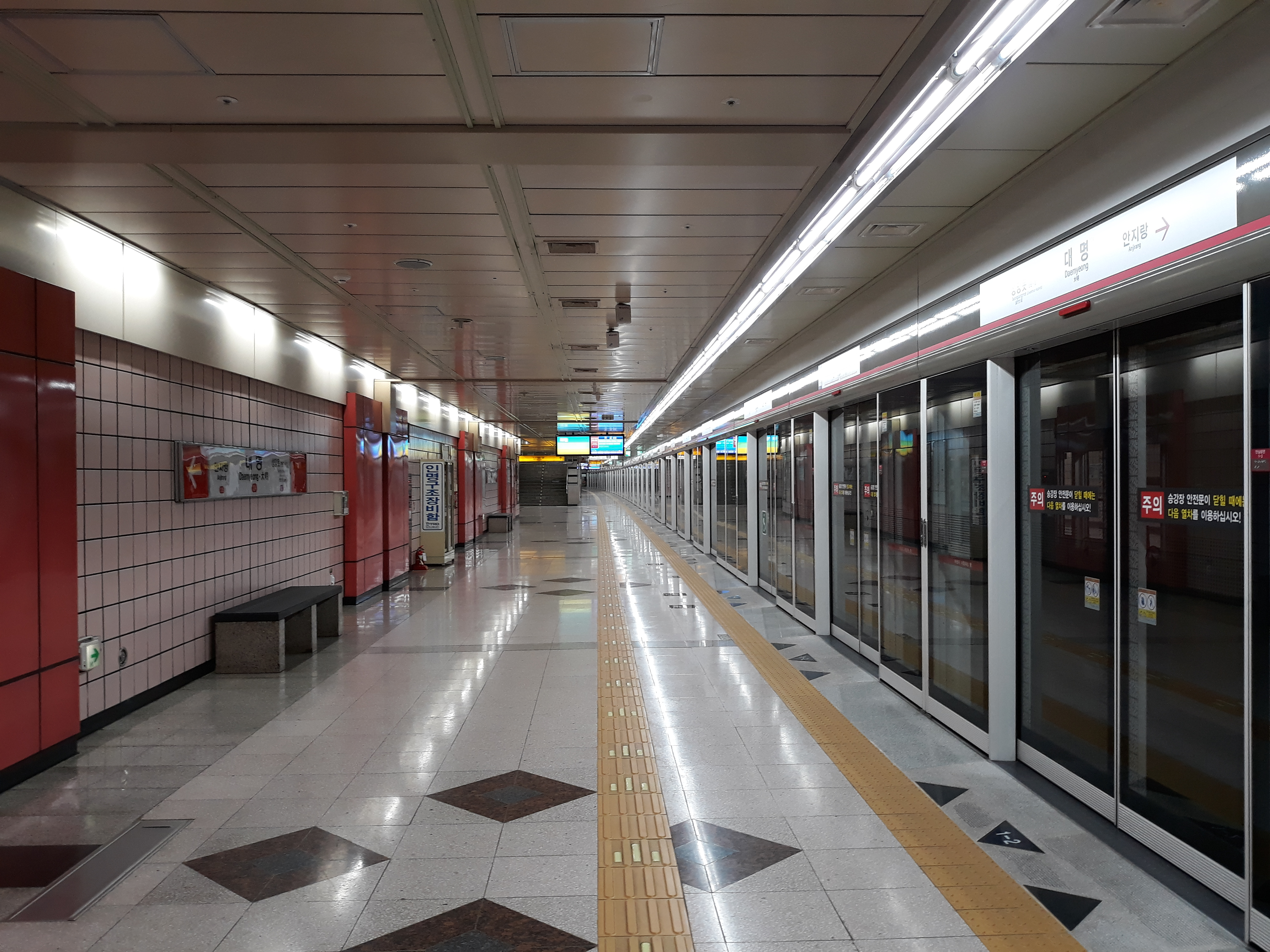
- Station platform

Korean name
- Hangul: 대명역
- Hanja: 大明驛
- Revised Romanization: Daemyeongyeok
- McCune–Reischauer: Taemyŏngyŏk

General information
- Location: Daemyeong-dong, Nam District, Daegu; South Korea
- Coordinates: 35°50′21″N 128°33′56″E
- Operator: DTRO
- Line: Daegu Metro Line 1
- Platforms: 2
- Tracks: 2

Construction
- Structure type: Underground

Other information
- Station code: 124

History
- Opened: November 26, 1997
Location

Daemyeong station (Korean: 대명역) is a railway station in Nam District, Daegu, South Korea, on Daegu Metro Line 1.

== Number of passengers per year ==
1997	1998	1999	2000	2001	2002	2003	2004	2005	2006	2007	2008	2009
2406	2707	2762	undisclosed	2701	2774	1658	2610	2688	3318	3168	3169	3094

Preceding station	Daegu Metro	Following station
Seobu Bus Terminal towards Seolhwa–Myeonggok	Line 1	Anjirang towards Hayang
