= Banyawol station =

Station of the Daegu Metro

Coordinates: 35°51′58″N 128°42′49″E

144 반야월 Banyawol
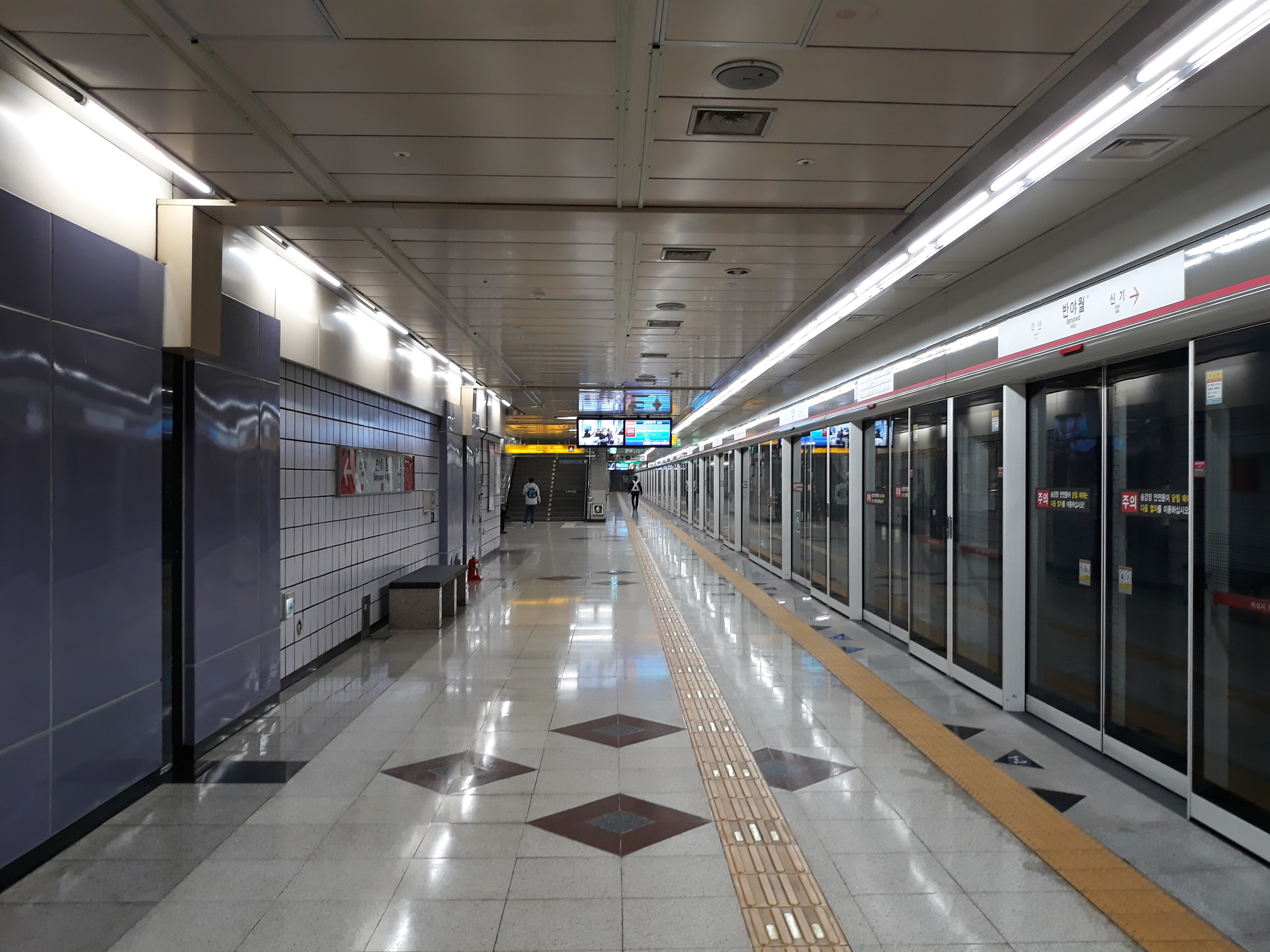
- Station platform

Korean name
- Hangul: 반야월역
- Hanja: 半夜月驛
- Revised Romanization: Banyawollyeok
- McCune–Reischauer: Panyawŏllyŏk

General information
- Location: Seoho-dong and Dongho-dong, Dong District, Daegu; South Korea
- Operator: DTRO
- Line: Daegu Metro Line 1
- Platforms: 2
- Tracks: 2

Construction
- Structure type: Underground

Other information
- Station code: 144

History
- Opened: May 2, 1998
Location

Banyawol Station (Korean: 반야월역; Hanja: 半夜月驛; RR: Banyawol-yeok) is a station of the Daegu Subway Line 1 in Seoho-dong and Dongho-dong, Dong District, Daegu, South Korea. It is connected with the last stop of the downtown bus. Its use frequently is reportedly low.

Preceding station	Daegu Metro	Following station
Singi towards Seolhwa–Myeonggok	Line 1	Gaksan towards Hayang
