= Anjirang station =

Station of the Daegu Metro

Coordinates: 35°50′21″N 128°34′26″E

125 안지랑 (대구가톨릭대학교병원) Anjirang (Daegu Catholic Univ. Hospital)
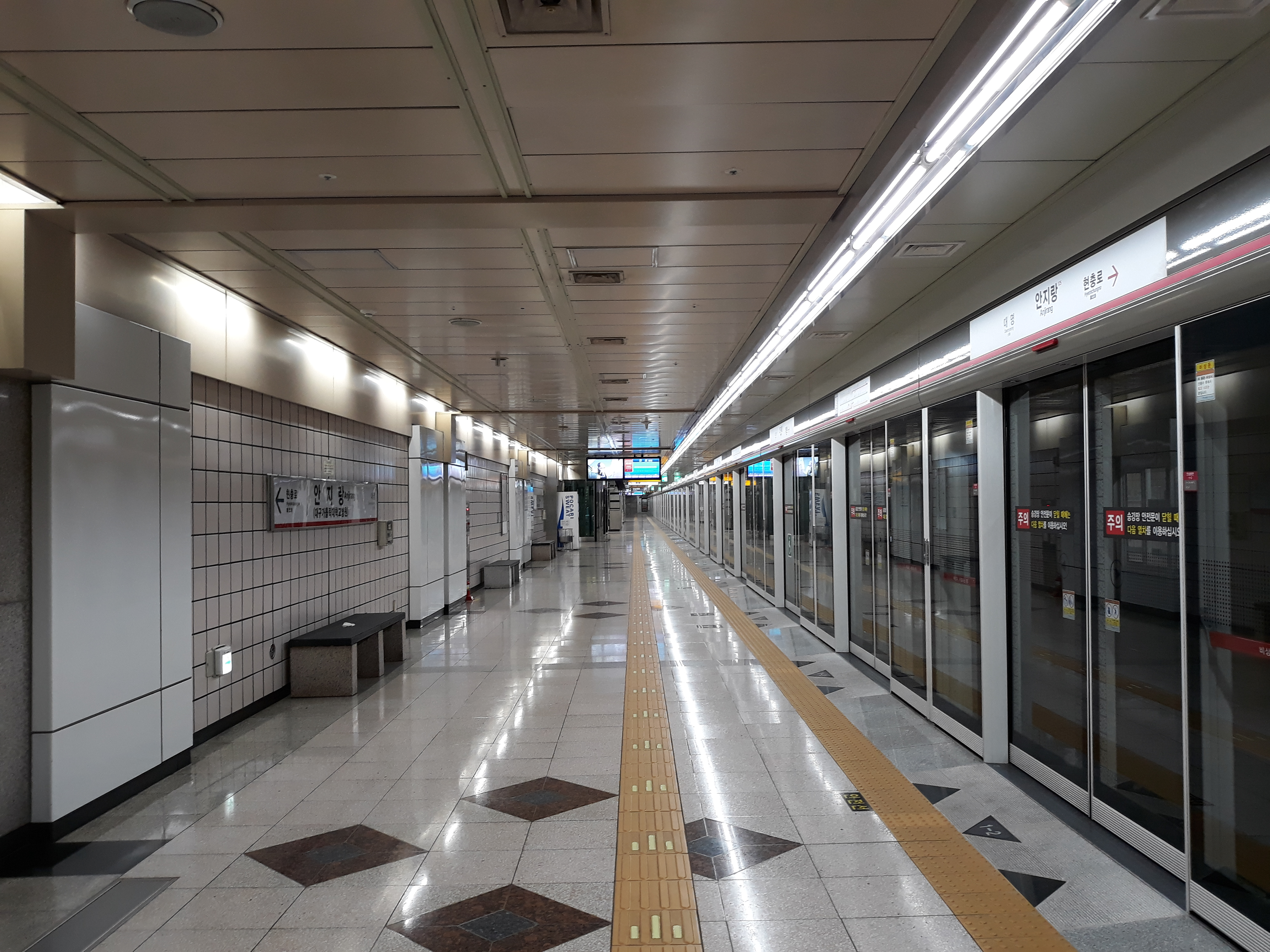
- Station platform

General information
- Location: Daemyeong-ro, Nam District, Daegu; South Korea
- Operator: DTRO
- Line: Daegu Metro Line 1
- Platforms: 2
- Tracks: 2

Construction
- Structure type: Underground

Other information
- Station code: 125

History
- Opened: November 26, 1997
Location

Anjirang station is a station of Daegu Subway Line 1 in Nam-gu, Daegu, South Korea.

Anjirang Gopchang Street, the alley filled with restaurants serving marinated pork gopchang (intestines),' is located adjacent to Anjirang Station.

== Number of passengers by year ==
- 1997: 3036
- 1998: 3320
- 1999: 3390
- 2000: Undisclosed
- 2001: 3247
- 2002: 3435
- 2003: 1910
- 2004: 3301
- 2005: 3396
- 2006: 4095
- 2007: 3952
- 2008: 3907
- 2009: 3907

Preceding station	Daegu Metro	Following station
Daemyeong towards Seolhwa–Myeonggok	Line 1	Hyeonchungno towards Hayang
