= Yulha station =

Station of the Daegu Metro

Coordinates: 35°52′11″N 128°41′34″E

142 율하 (의료 R&D 지구 DRT·항시원외과) Yulha (Medical R&D District, DRT & Hangsiwon Surgical Clinic)
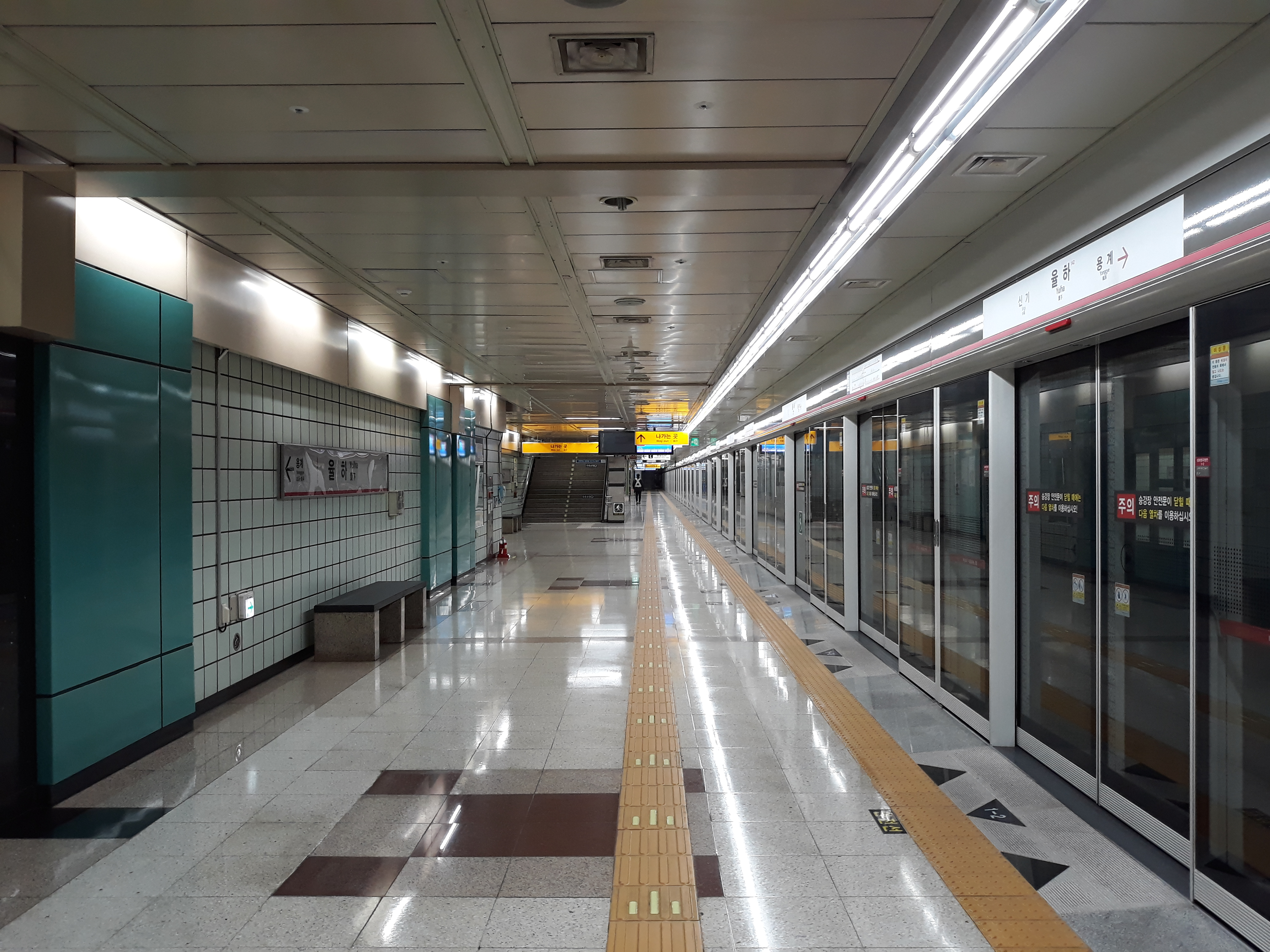
- Station platform

Korean name
- Hangul: 율하역
- Hanja: 栗下驛
- Revised Romanization: Yulhayeok
- McCune–Reischauer: Yurhayŏk

General information
- Location: Yulha-dong, Dong District, Daegu; South Korea
- Operator: DTRO
- Line: Daegu Metro Line 1
- Platforms: 2
- Tracks: 2

Construction
- Structure type: Underground

Other information
- Station code: 142

History
- Opened: May 2, 1998
Location

Yulha Station (Korean: 율하역; Hanja: 栗下驛; RR: Yulha-yeok) is a station of Daegu Subway Line 1 in Yulha-dong, Dong District, Daegu, South Korea. Two exits were established in 2010. Beomanno Road is to the south. Apartments in the neighborhood were built by new city development.

Preceding station	Daegu Metro	Following station
Yonggye towards Seolhwa–Myeonggok	Line 1	Singi towards Hayang
