= Dongchon station =

Station of the Daegu Metro

Coordinates: 35°53′10″N 128°39′01″E

138 동촌 (동촌유원지) Dongchon (Dongchon Resort)
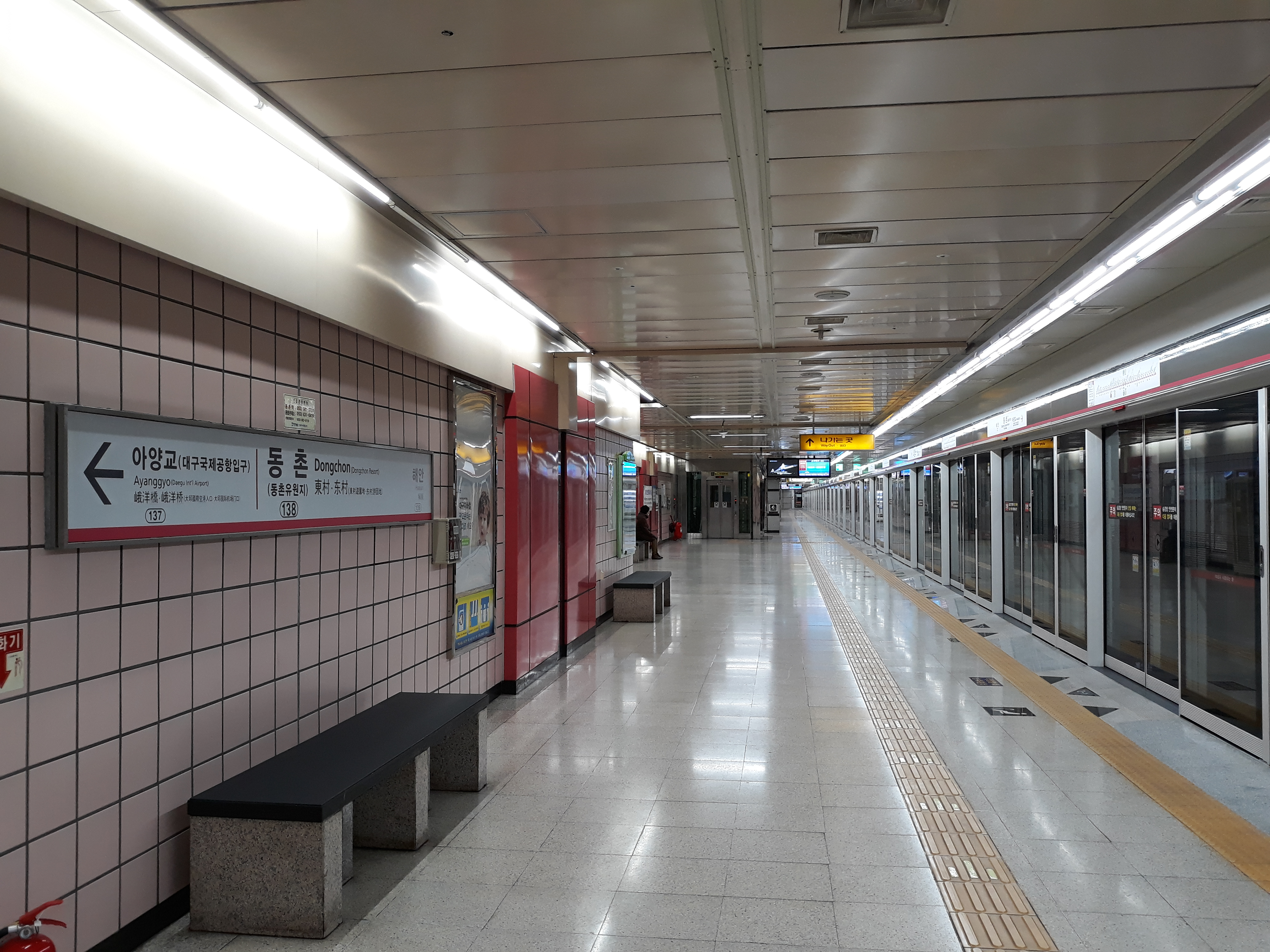
- Station platform

Korean name
- Hangul: 동촌역
- Hanja: 東村驛
- Revised Romanization: Dongchonnyeok
- McCune–Reischauer: Tongch'onnyŏk

General information
- Location: Geomsa-dong, Dong District, Daegu; South Korea
- Operator: DTRO
- Line: Daegu Metro Line 1
- Platforms: 2
- Tracks: 2

Construction
- Structure type: Underground

Other information
- Station code: 138

History
- Opened: May 2, 1998
Location

Dongchon Station is a station of the Daegu Subway Line 1 in Geomsa-dong, Dong District, Daegu, South Korea. It is located at Dongchon old course (동촌구길). As it is connected with Ayanggyo station by underwater tunnel, it is deeper than any other station of Daegu Subway Line 1. It takes its name from Dongchon.

Preceding station	Daegu Metro	Following station
Ayanggyo towards Seolhwa–Myeonggok	Line 1	Haean towards Hayang
