= Ansim station =

Station of the Daegu Metro

146 안심 (혁신도시·첨복단지) Ansim (Innovation City·High-tech Medical Complex)
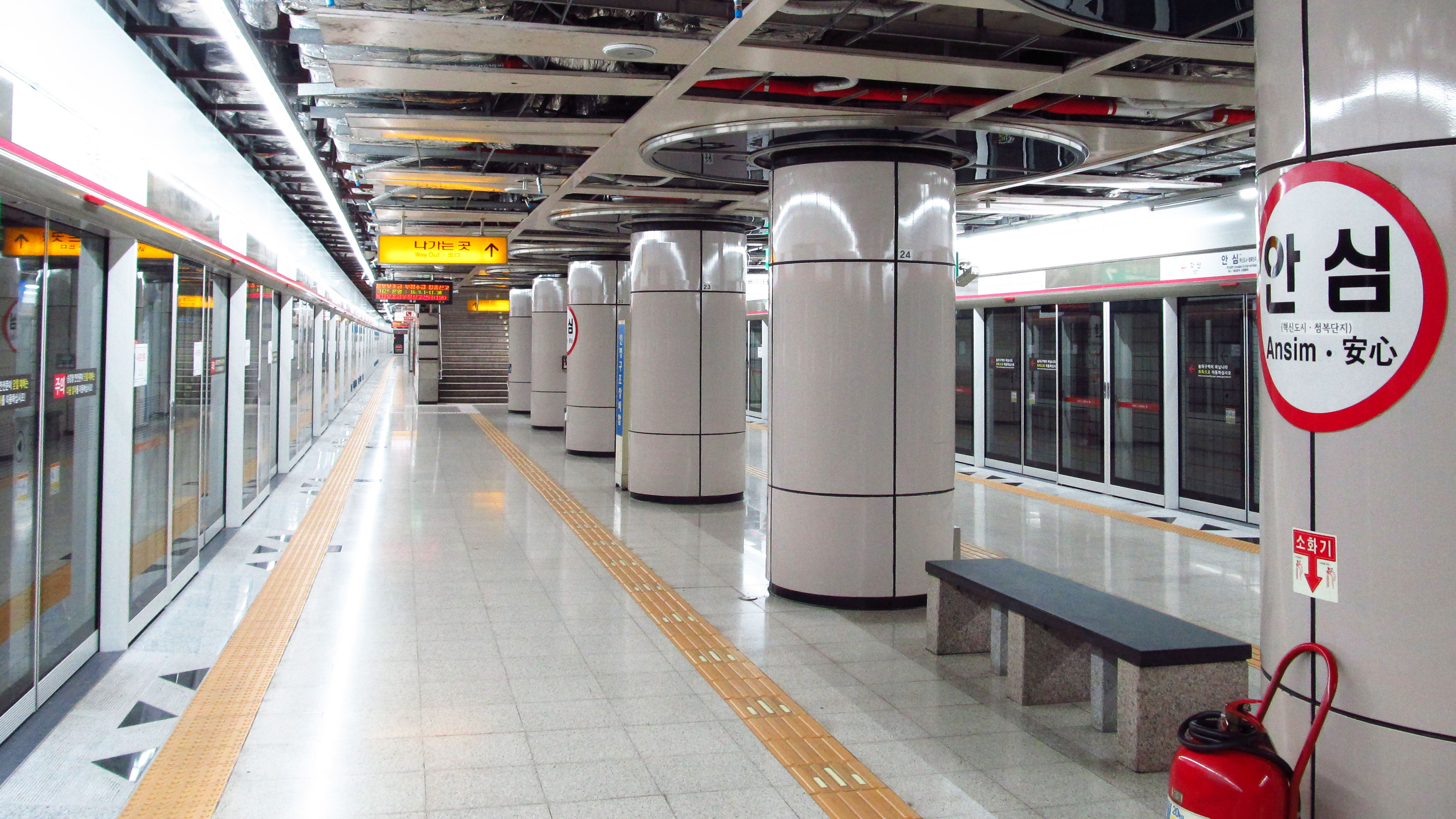
- The platform in October 2016

Korean name
- Hangul: 안심역
- Hanja: 安心驛
- RR: Ansim-yeok
- MR: Ansim-yŏk

General information
- Location: 536-1 Goejeon-dong; Jiha455, Ansim-ro, Dong District, Daegu; South Korea
- Coordinates: 35°52′16″N 128°44′01″E
- Operator: DTRO
- Line: Line 1
- Platforms: 1
- Tracks: 2

Construction
- Structure type: Underground

Other information
- Station code: 146

History
- Opened: May 2, 1998

Services
Preceding station	Daegu Metro	Following station
Gaksan towards Seolhwa–Myeonggok	Line 1	Daegu Haany University Hospital towards Hayang
Location

Ansim Station (Korean: 안심역; Hanja: 安心驛; RR: Ansim-yeok) is a station on Daegu Metro Line 1 at Dong-gu in Daegu, South Korea. The name of the station comes from King Taejo of Goryeo, who was victorious in battles with Later Baekje, and felt relieved when he went to the location "Ansim". The literal translation of "Ansim" is "relieved" and "peace of mind".

== Ansim Depot ==
Approximately 1 mile (1.6 km) east of Ansim station is Ansim Depot, an outdoor storage depot and maintenance yard. Cars and heavy overhaul for Line 1 cars are completed here. The depot is on Daerim-ro and visible from southside of Gyeongbu Expressway.

== Station Layout ==
G	Street Level	Exits
L1	Concourse	Faregates, Ticketing Machines, Station Control
L2; Platforms	Southbound	← Line 1 toward Seolhwa–Myeonggok (Gaksan)
L2; Platforms	Island platform, doors will open on the left
L2; Platforms	Northbound	→ Line 1 toward Hayang (Daegu Haany University Hospital) →
