= Singi station =

Station of the Daegu Metro

Coordinates: 35°52′00″N 128°42′09″E

143 신기 (신기한속내과) Singi (Singi Cold Internal Medicine)
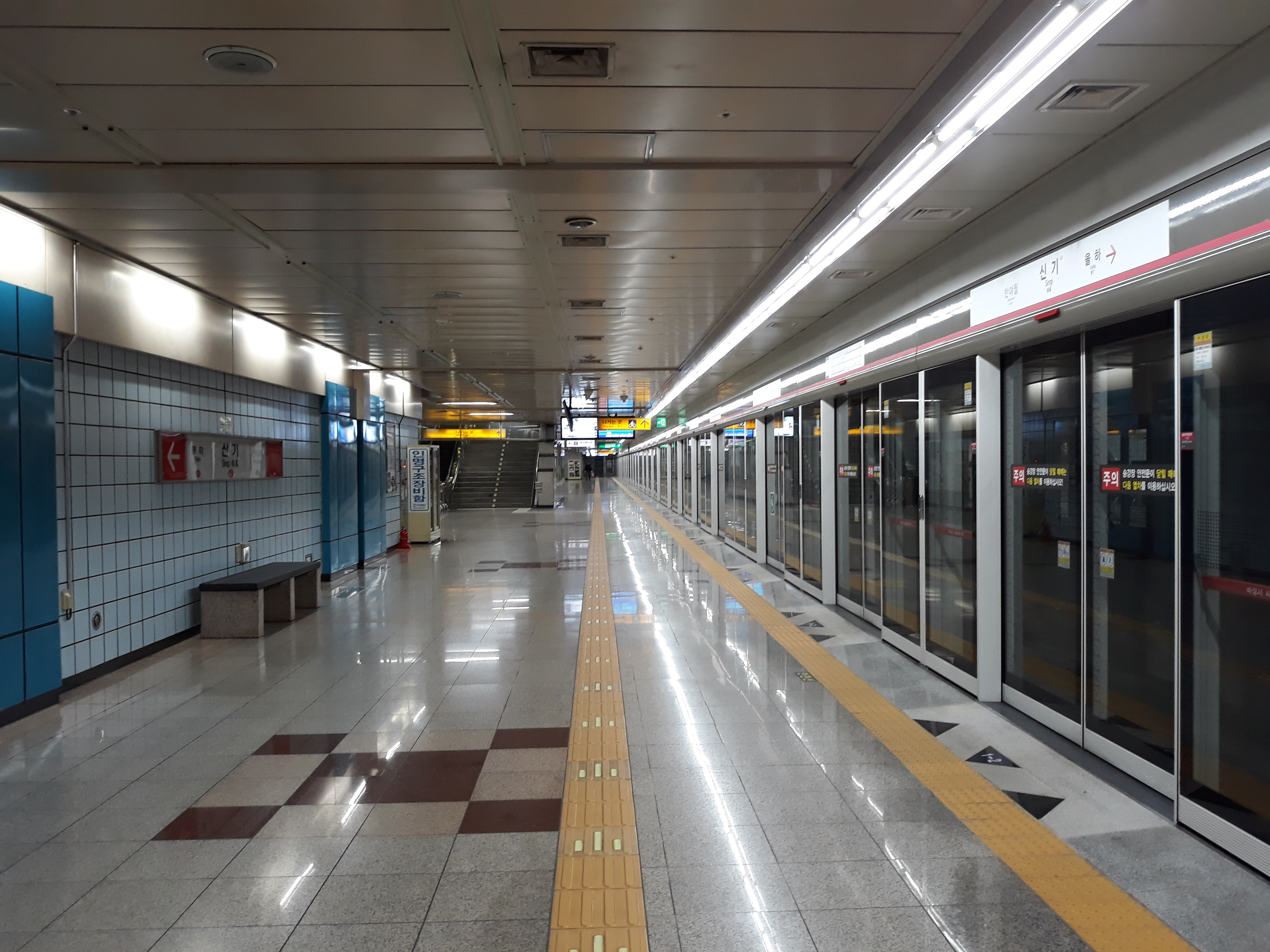
- Station platform

Korean name
- Hangul: 신기역
- Hanja: 新基驛
- Revised Romanization: Singiyeok
- McCune–Reischauer: Sin'giyŏk

General information
- Location: Singi-dong, Dong District, Daegu; South Korea
- Operator: DTRO
- Line: Daegu Metro Line 1
- Platforms: 2
- Tracks: 2

Construction
- Structure type: Underground

Other information
- Station code: 143

History
- Opened: May 2, 1998
Location

Singi Station (Korean: 신기역; Hanja: 新基驛; RR: Singi-yeok) is a station on Daegu Subway Line 1 in Singi-dong, Dong District, Daegu, South Korea.

Preceding station	Daegu Metro	Following station
Yulha towards Seolhwa–Myeonggok	Line 1	Banyawol towards Hayang
