= Dong-gu Office station =

Station of the Daegu Metro

Coordinates: 35°53′04″N 128°37′56″E

136 동구청 (큰고개) Dong-gu Office (Keungogae)
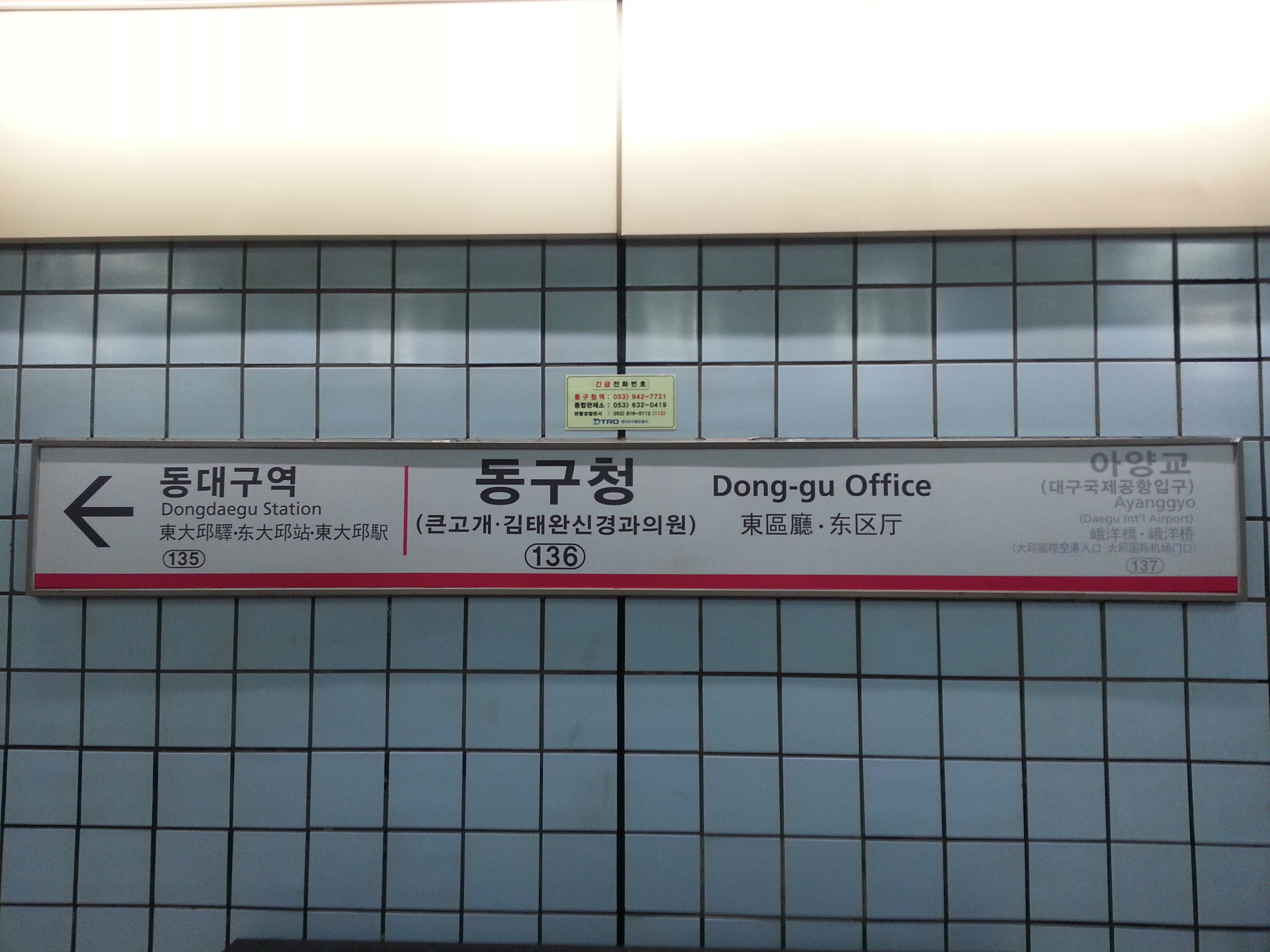
- Station nameplate

Korean name
- Hangul: 동구청역
- Hanja: 東區廳驛
- Revised Romanization: Donggucheongnyeok
- McCune–Reischauer: Tongguch'ŏngnyŏk

General information
- Location: Sinam-dong, Dong District, Daegu; South Korea
- Operator: DTRO
- Line: Daegu Metro Line 1
- Platforms: 2
- Tracks: 2

Construction
- Structure type: Underground

Other information
- Station code: 136

History
- Opened: May 2, 1998
Location

Dong-gu Office Station is a station of Daegu Subway Line 1 in Sinam-dong, Dong District, Daegu, South Korea. It is located at Keungogae five-way crossing (큰고개오거리).

Preceding station	Daegu Metro	Following station
Dongdaegu Station towards Seolhwa–Myeonggok	Line 1	Ayanggyo towards Hayang
