= Sincheon station (Daegu Metro) =

Station of the Daegu Metro

Coordinates: 35°52′29″N 128°37′04″E

134 신천 (경북대입구) Sincheon (Kyungpook Nat'l Univ.)
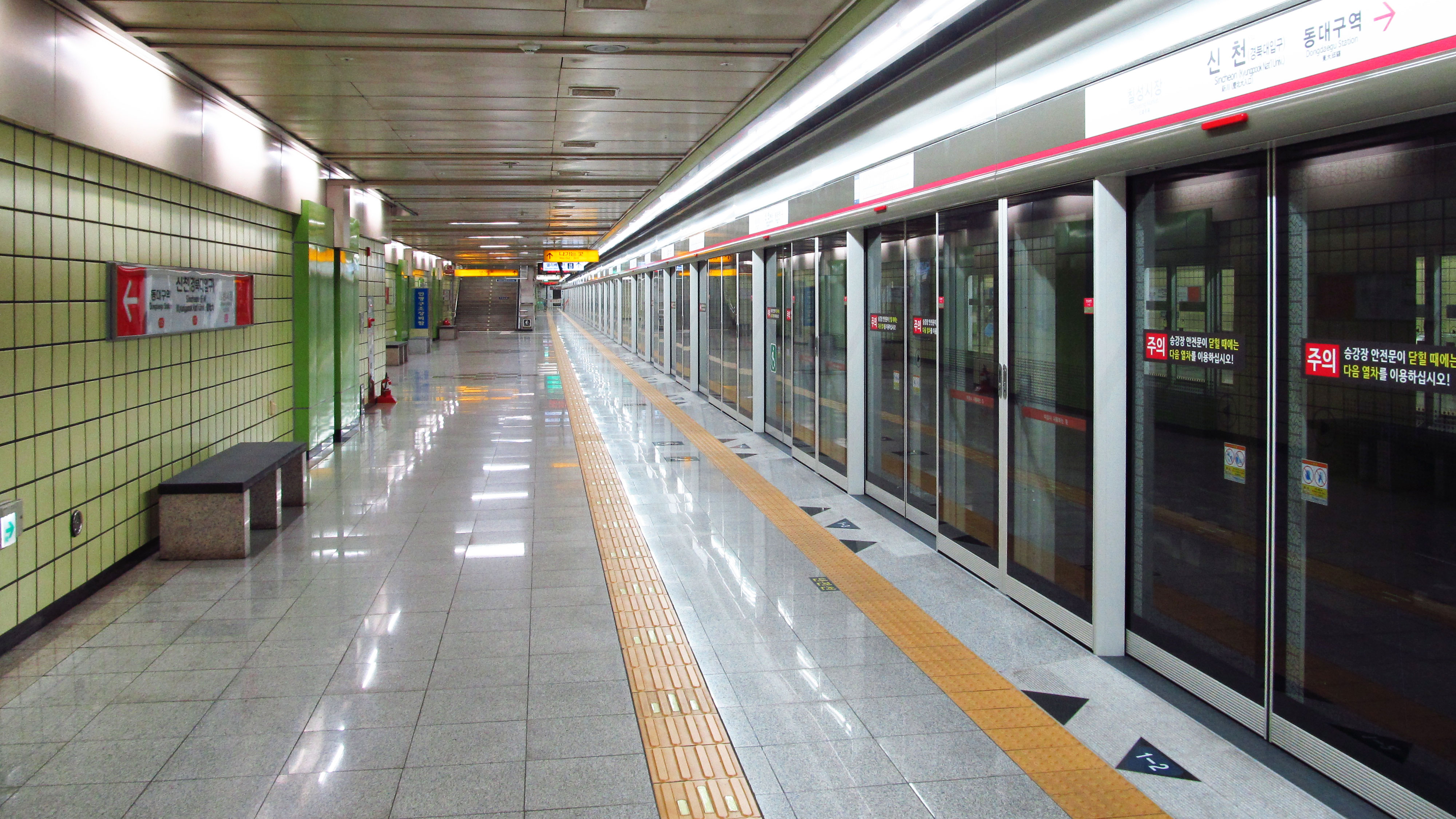
- Station platform

Korean name
- Hangul: 신천역
- Hanja: 新川驛
- Revised Romanization: Sincheonnyeok
- McCune–Reischauer: Sinch'ŏnnyŏk

General information
- Location: Sincheon-dong, Dong District, Daegu; South Korea
- Operator: DTRO
- Line: Daegu Metro Line 1
- Platforms: 2
- Tracks: 2

Construction
- Structure type: Underground

Other information
- Station code: 134

History
- Opened: May 2, 1998
Location

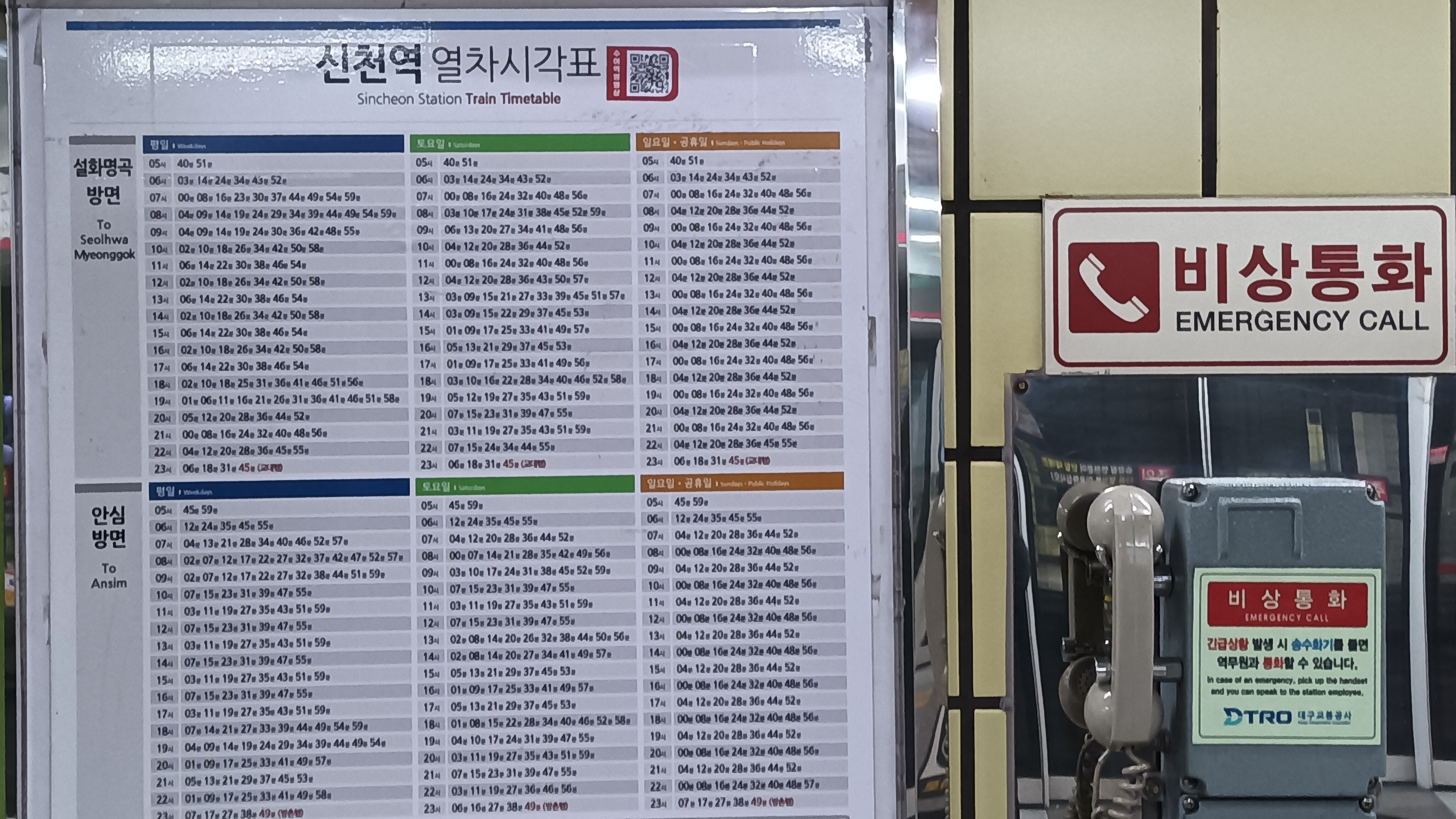
Time table of Sincheon station

Sincheon Station is a station of the Daegu Subway Line 1 in Sincheon-dong, Dong District, Daegu, South Korea. Kyungpook National University is nearby. A stair was removed at entrance 4 and an escalator was put in its place.

Preceding station	Daegu Metro	Following station
Chilseong Market towards Seolhwa–Myeonggok	Line 1	Dongdaegu Station towards Hayang
