= Bangchon station =

Station of the Daegu Metro

Coordinates: 35°52′47″N 128°40′12″E

140 방촌 Bangchon
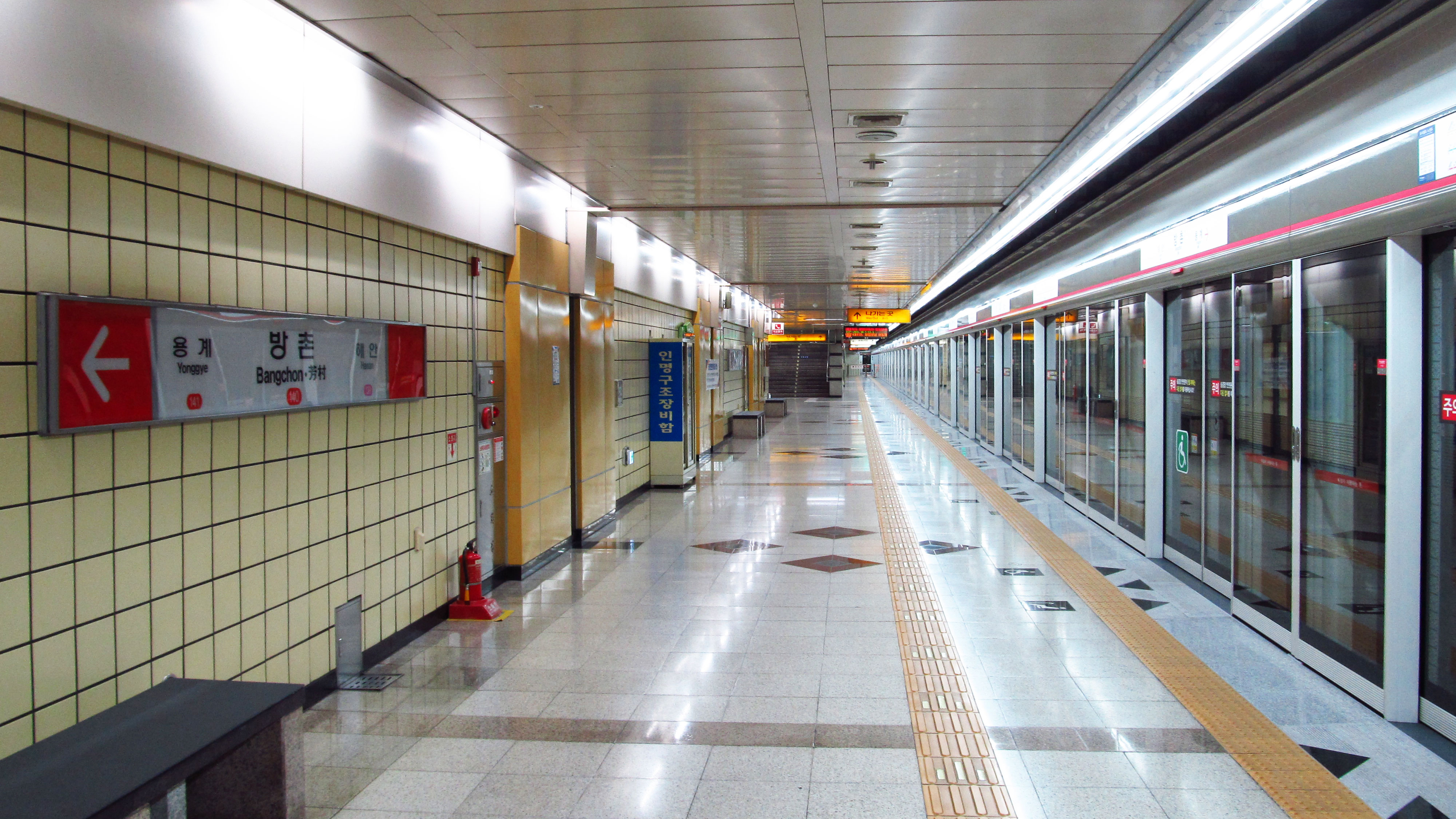
- Station platform

Korean name
- Hangul: 방촌역
- Hanja: 芳村驛
- Revised Romanization: Bangchonnyeok
- McCune–Reischauer: Pangch'onnyŏk

General information
- Location: Bangchon-dong, Dong District, Daegu; South Korea
- Operator: DTRO
- Line: Daegu Metro Line 1
- Platforms: 2
- Tracks: 2

Construction
- Structure type: Underground

Other information
- Station code: 140

History
- Opened: May 2, 1998
Location

Bangchon Station is a station of the Daegu Subway Line 1 in Bangchon-dong, Dong District, Daegu, South Korea. It has train service until midnight.

Preceding station	Daegu Metro	Following station
Haean towards Seolhwa–Myeonggok	Line 1	Yonggye towards Hayang
