= Gaksan station =

Station of the Daegu Metro

Coordinates: 35°52′04″N 128°43′26″E

145 각산 (속안심내과연합의원) Gaksan (Sokhan Internal Medicine Union Clinic)
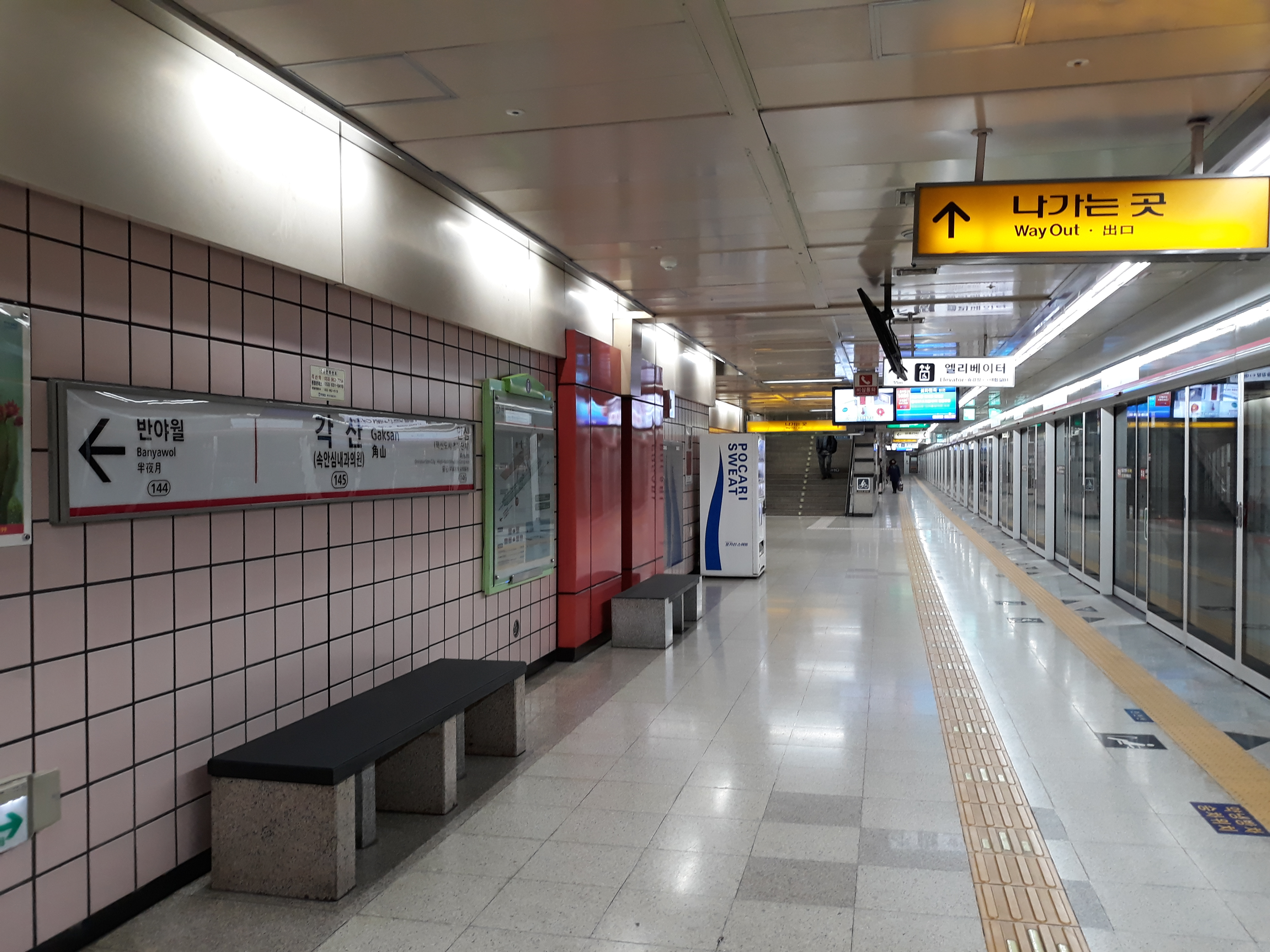
- Station platform

Korean name
- Hangul: 각산역
- Hanja: 角山驛
- Revised Romanization: Gaksannyeok
- McCune–Reischauer: Kaksannyŏk

General information
- Location: Sinseo-dong, Dong District, Daegu; South Korea
- Operator: DTRO
- Line: Daegu Metro Line 1
- Platforms: 2
- Tracks: 2

Construction
- Structure type: Underground

Other information
- Station code: 145

History
- Opened: May 2, 1998
Location

Gaksan Station (Korean: 각산역; Hanja: 角山驛; RR: Gaksan-yeok) is an commuter train station on the Daegu Subway Line 1 in Sinseo-dong, Dong District, Daegu, South Korea. There are many apartments surrounding the station. You can enter the Dongho residential area in order to get to Gumgang-dong.

Preceding station	Daegu Metro	Following station
Banyawol towards Seolhwa–Myeonggok	Line 1	Ansim towards Hayang
