= Yonggye station =

Station of the Daegu Metro

Coordinates: 35°52′35″N 128°40′53″E

141 용계 (영진직업전문학교) Yonggye (Yeungjin Vocational College)
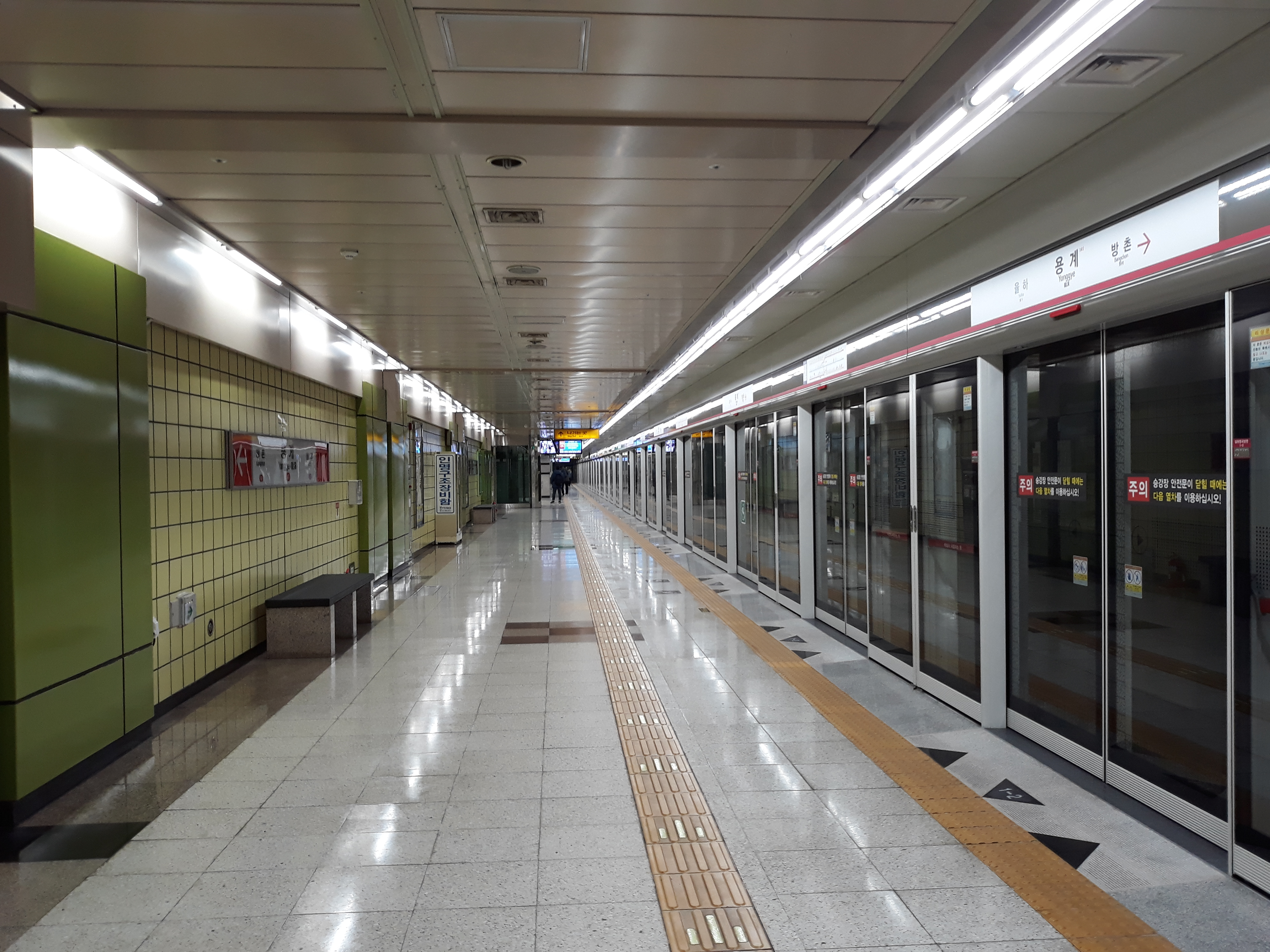
- Station platform

Korean name
- Hangul: 용계역
- Hanja: 龍溪驛
- Revised Romanization: Yonggye-yeok
- McCune–Reischauer: Yonggye-yŏk

General information
- Location: Dong District, Daegu; South Korea
- Operator: DTRO
- Line: Daegu Metro Line 1
- Platforms: 2
- Tracks: 2

Construction
- Structure type: Underground

Other information
- Station code: 141

History
- Opened: May 2, 1998
Location

Yonggye Station (Korean: 용계역; Hanja: 龍溪驛; RR: Yonggye-yeok) is a station of Daegu Subway Line 1 at Dong-gu in Daegu, South Korea.

== Year-The number of passenger ==
- 1998-1012
- 1999-1449
- 2000-undisclosed
- 2001-2049
- 2002-2215
- 2003-1098
- 2004-1973
- 2005-1941
- 2006-2258
- 2007-2241
- 2008-2195
- 2009-2132

Preceding station	Daegu Metro	Following station
Bangchon towards Seolhwa–Myeonggok	Line 1	Yulha towards Hayang
