= Hyeonchungno station =

Station of the Daegu Metro

126 현충로 Hyeonchungno
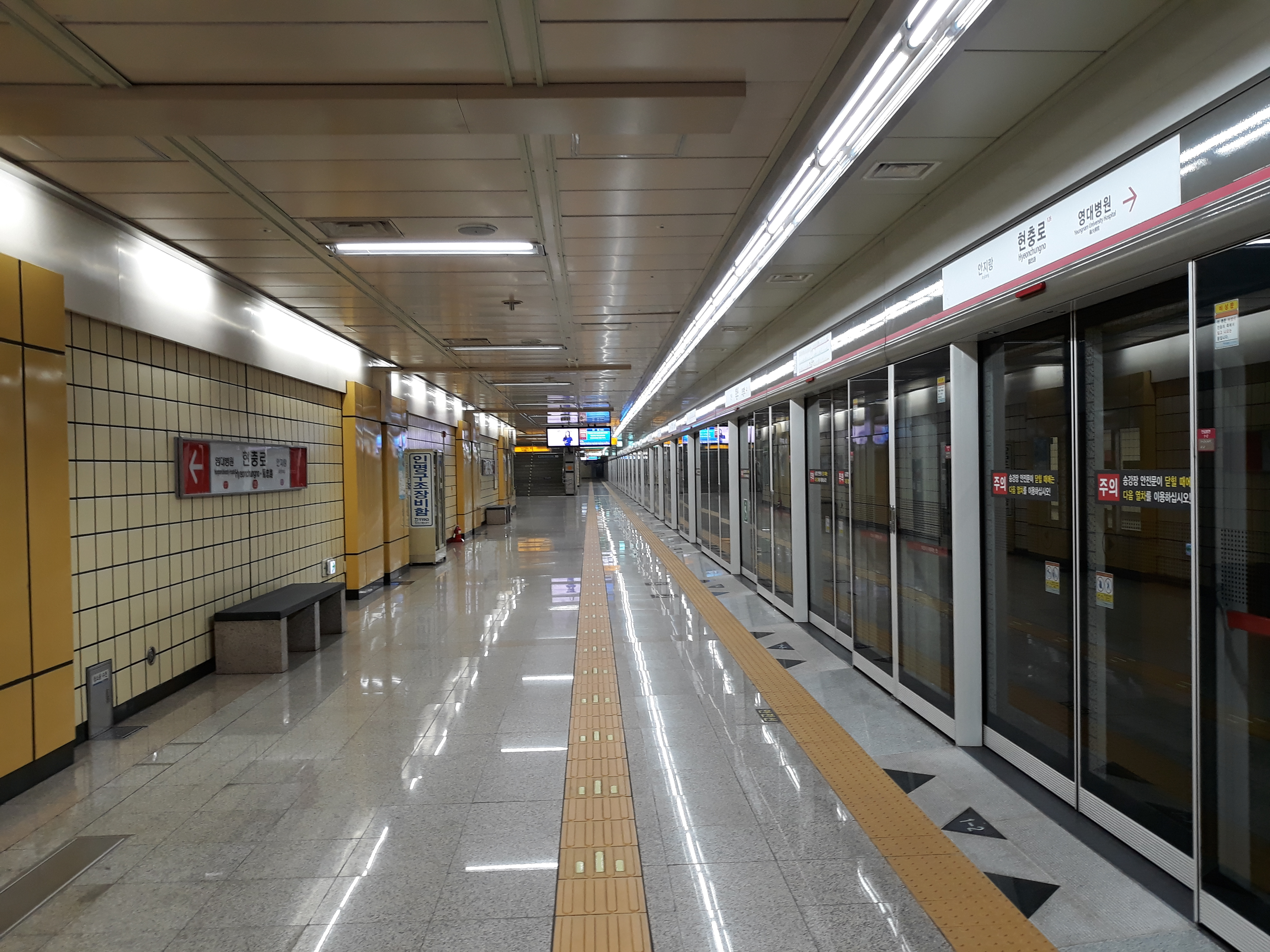
- Station platform

Korean name
- Hangul: 현충로역
- Hanja: 顯忠路驛
- Revised Romanization: Hyeonchungnoyeok
- McCune–Reischauer: Hyŏnch'ungnoyŏk

General information
- Location: Daemyeong-dong, Nam District, Daegu; South Korea
- Coordinates: 35°50′27″N 128°34′53″E
- Operator: DTRO
- Line: Daegu Metro Line 1
- Platforms: 2
- Tracks: 2

Construction
- Structure type: Underground

Other information
- Station code: 126

History
- Opened: November 26, 1997
Location

Hyeonchungno Station is a station of Daegu Metro Line 1 in Nam District, Daegu, South Korea.

== Passengers by year ==
Year	Passengers
1997	2303
1998	2795
1999	2955
2000	Undisclosed
2001	2851
2002	3065
2003	1658
2004	2830
2005	2951
2006	3629
2007	3493
2008	3491
2009	3379

Preceding station	Daegu Metro	Following station
Anjirang towards Seolhwa–Myeonggok	Line 1	Yeungnam University Hospital towards Hayang
