= Jungangno station (Daegu Metro) =

Metro station in Daegu, South Korea

131 중앙로 Jungangno
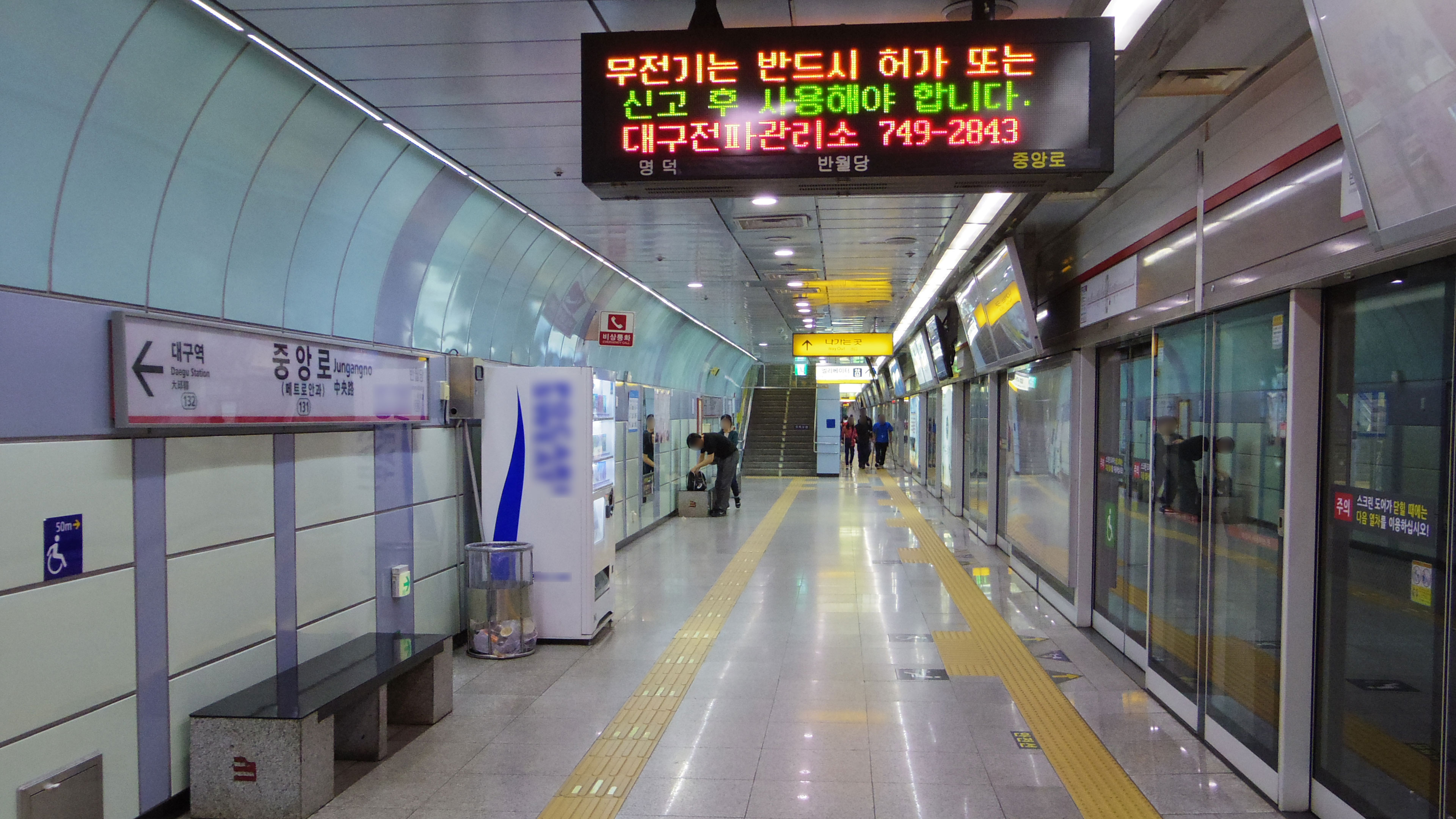
- The platform for Ansim, October 2016

Korean name
- Hangul: 중앙로역
- Hanja: 中央路驛
- Revised Romanization: Jungangnoyeok
- McCune–Reischauer: Chungangnoyŏk

General information
- Location: Seongnae-dong, Jung District, Daegu; South Korea
- Coordinates: 35°52′16″N 128°35′38″E
- Operator: DTRO
- Line: Daegu Metro Line 1
- Platforms: 2
- Tracks: 2

Construction
- Structure type: Underground

Other information
- Station code: 131

History
- Opened: November 26, 1997
Location

Jungangno Station is a station of Daegu Metro Line 1 in Jung-gu, Daegu, South Korea. With its prime location at the heart of Daegu and its proximity to a major shopping district, it is the second-busiest station in the Daegu Metro, after Banwoldang Station, which is the only transfer point between the Line 1 and Line 2. Many facilities, including a branch of Kyobo Book Centre, movie theaters, and several large banks are in the vicinity.

This station served as the terminus point for Line 1 from November 26, 1997, to May 2, 1998. Despite its large foot traffic, the platforms for this station are narrower than other Line 1 stations. It is also connected to the Daehyun PriMall, an underground shopping center, giving it a much larger than normal access area.

In 2003, an arsonist set fire to a train stopped at Jungangno Station. The fire killed 192 people.

Preceding station	Daegu Metro	Following station
Banwoldang towards Seolhwa–Myeonggok	Line 1	Daegu Station towards Hayang
