= Banwoldang station =

Station of the Daegu Metro in South Korea

130 230 반월당 (동아백화점) Banwoldang (Donga Department Store)
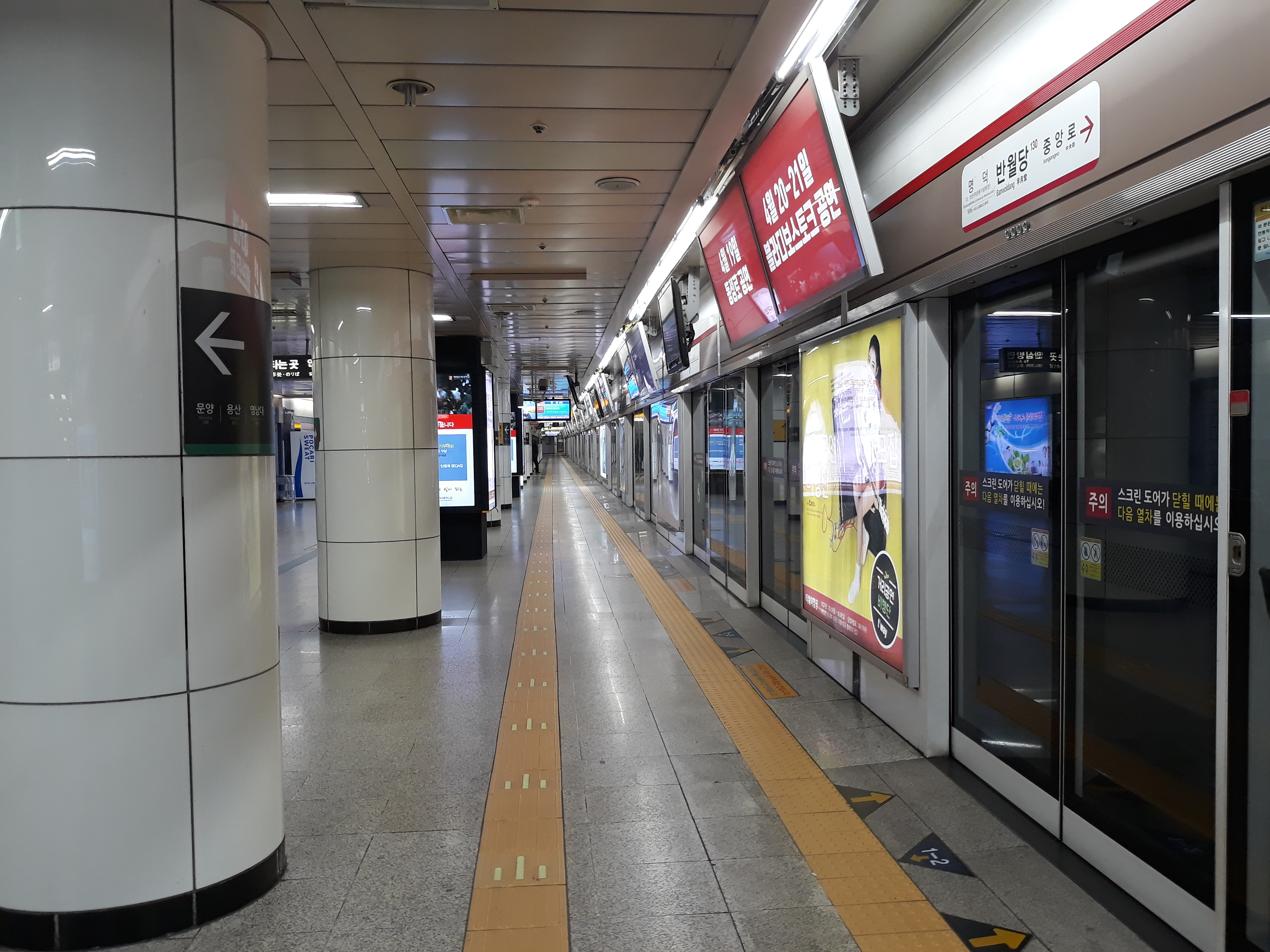
- Railway platform on Line 1

Korean name
- Hangul: 반월당
- Hanja: 半月堂
- Revised Romanization: Banwoldang
- McCune–Reischauer: Panwŏldang

General information
- Location: Deoksan-dong, Jung District, Daegu; South Korea
- Coordinates: 35°51′53″N 128°35′36″E
- Operator: Daegu Transportation Corporation
- Lines: Line 1 Line 2
- Platforms: ● Line 1: 2 ● Line 2: 1
- Tracks: ● Line 1: 2 ● Line 2: 2

Construction
- Structure type: Underground

Other information
- Station code: ● Line 1: 130 ● Line 2: 230

History
- Opened: ● Line 1: November 26, 1997 ● Line 2: October 18, 2005

Services
Preceding station	Daegu Metro	Following station
Myeongdeok towards Seolhwa–Myeonggok	Line 1	Jungangno towards Hayang
Cheongna Hill towards Munyang	Line 2	Kyungpook National University Hospital towards Yeungnam University
Location

Banwoldang Station (Korean: 반월당역; Hanja: 半月堂驛; RR: Banwoldang-yeok) is a station of the Daegu Metro Line 1 and Line 2 in Deoksan-dong, Jung District, Daegu, South Korea. Banwoldang Station is the only transfer station of Daegu Metro. Banwoldang underground shopping was created with the second line opening.

Banwoldang, the name of station, is derived from the location of the first department store in Daegu.
