= Daegu subway fire =

2003 subway arson in Daegu, South Korea

Coordinates: 35°52′16″N 128°35′39″E

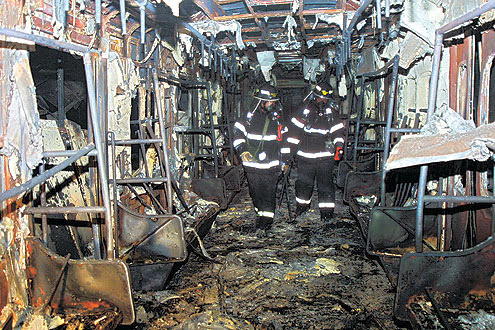
- Firemen inspect the wreckage of a train car post-fire
- Location: Jungangno station, Daegu, South Korea
- Date: February 18, 2003; 23 years ago 9:53 a.m. (KST)
- Target: Daegu Metropolitan Subway
- Attack type: Arson, mass murder, attempted suicide attack
- Weapon: Two milk cartons filled with a flammable liquid
- Deaths: 192
- Injuries: 151+ (including the perpetrator)
- Perpetrator: Kim Dae-han
- Verdict: Life imprisonment
- Convictions: Homicide (192 counts); Arson

On February 18, 2003, an arsonist set fire to a Daegu Metro subway train as it arrived at Jungangno station in central Daegu, South Korea. The resulting blaze, which spread when a second train stopped at the same station, killed 192 people and injured another 151. It remains the deadliest loss of life in a single deliberate incident in South Korean peacetime history, surpassing the 1982 shooting rampage committed by Woo Bum-kon.

== Arsonist ==
The arsonist, Kim Dae-han (김대한; 金大漢), was a 56-year-old unemployed former taxi driver who had suffered a stroke in November 2001 that left him partly paralyzed. Kim was dissatisfied with his medical treatment and had expressed sentiments of violence and depression; he later told police he wanted to kill himself, but to do so in a crowded place rather than alone. By most accounts, on the morning of February 18, he boarded train 1079 on Line 1 in the direction of Daegok Station, carrying a duffel bag that contained two green milk cartons filled with a flammable liquid, possibly paint thinner or gasoline.

== Arson ==
As the train left Banwoldang station around 9:53 a.m., Kim began fumbling with the cartons and a cigarette lighter, alarming other passengers who tried to stop him. In the struggle, one of the cartons spilled and its liquid contents caught fire as the train pulled into Jungangno station in downtown Daegu. Kim, his back and legs on fire, managed to escape along with many passengers on train 1079, but within two minutes the fire had spread to all six cars. The fire spread quickly in the insulation between the layers of aluminium that form the shell of the cars, the vinyl and plastic materials in seat cushions and strap handles, and heavy plastic matting on the floors, producing thick smoke as it burned.

=== Errors compounding the disaster ===
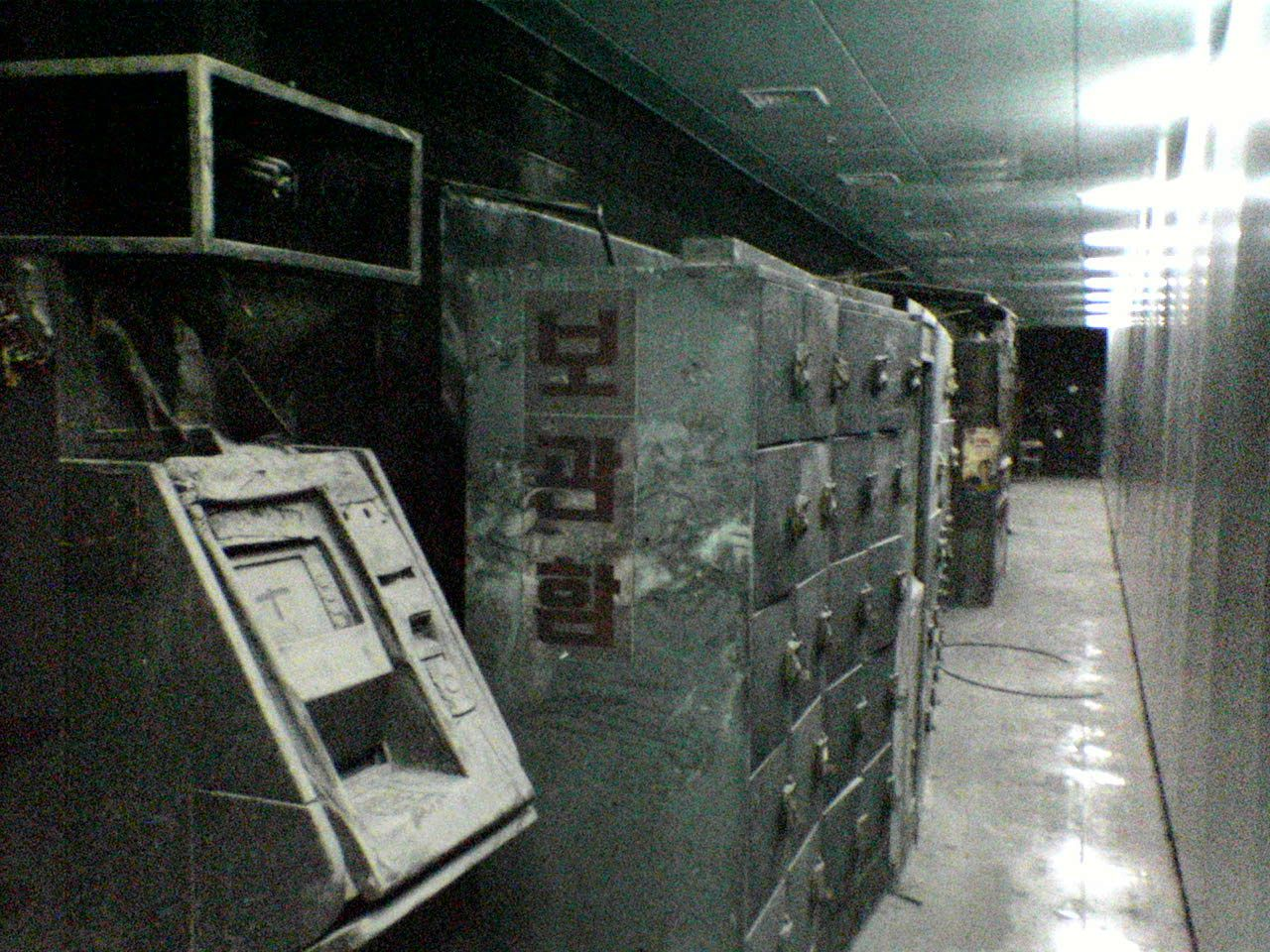
Smoke-damaged lockers and ATM

The operator of the train, Choi Jeong-hwan (최정환; 崔政煥; aged 31), failed to notify subway officials immediately of the fire.

Smoke being visible on their closed-circuit television monitors, subway officials radioed the operator of train 1080, Choi Sang-yeol (최상열; 崔相烈), advising him to proceed with caution because there was a fire in the station. Train 1080 entered Jungangno station and stopped alongside blazing train 1079 approximately four minutes later. The doors opened only briefly, then shut, apparently in an effort to keep out the toxic smoke that had filled the station. Shortly after train 1080's arrival, an automatic fire detector shut down the power supply to both trains, preventing train 1080 from leaving the station.

Transcripts show Choi Sang-yeol made three announcements advising passengers in train 1080 to remain seated while he attempted to reach superiors. Finally, he was advised "Quickly, run somewhere else. Go up... kill the engine and go." Choi then opened the doors and fled, but in doing so he removed the master key, which led to a shutdown of the onboard batteries that powered the train doors and effectively sealed passengers inside. Later investigation showed that all 79 passengers remained trapped inside train 1080 and died there.

Inadequate emergency equipment also worsened the disaster. Daegu subway trains at the time were not equipped with fire extinguishers, and the stations lacked sprinklers and emergency lighting. Many victims became disoriented in the dark, smoke-filled underground station and died of asphyxiation looking for exits. Emergency ventilation systems also proved inadequate. Over 1,300 fire and emergency personnel responded and the fire itself was extinguished around 1:38 p.m.; however, the toxicity of the smoke prevented them from entering the station for another three and a half hours.

== Victims ==
The intensity of the fire made it difficult to accurately assess the number of victims. Most were burned beyond recognition, many to the bone, and required DNA analysis to identify. A total of 192 people were confirmed to have died. Of the bodies found, 185 were identifiable; six could not initially be identified, of which three were discovered using DNA; and one person's possessions were identified but their remains could not be located.

As the incident occurred late in the morning rush hour, most of the victims were students or young women who worked in the downtown district's department stores, which opened at 10:30 a.m. Many were able to contact loved ones on their mobile phones, and mobile phone operators released call connection and attempt records to help authorities determine who was in the station.

== Aftermath ==
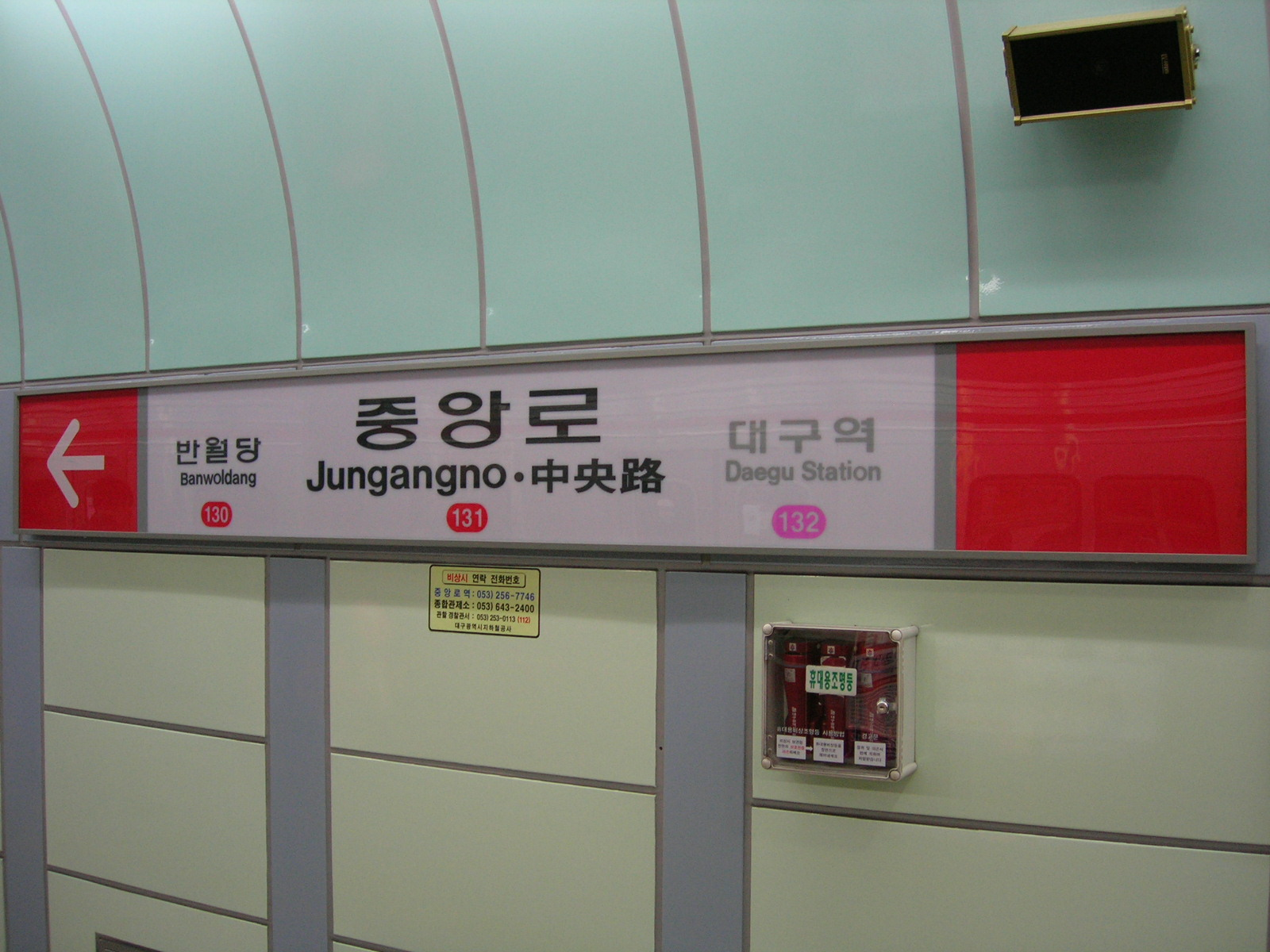
Remodeled Jungangno station 4 years later

The incident prompted outpourings of sympathy and anger from throughout South Korea and internationally.

Officials promised to install emergency lighting, increase the number of exit signs, make car interiors flame-resistant and heighten security in the Daegu Metropolitan Subway. Six stations were taken out of service for refurbishment and restored in April 2003. The tragedy was considered by many a national embarrassment, provoking debate about whether South Korea had cut too many corners in safety during its rapid industrialization. Several metro trains throughout the country were subsequently refurbished to improve fire-resistant standards within a few years of the accident.

On August 7, the Daegu District Court convicted Choi Sang-yeol, operator of train 1080, and Choi Jeong-hwan, operator of train 1079, sentencing them to prison for five and four years respectively for criminal negligence. Kim Dae-han was convicted of arson and homicide. Although prosecutors, with the support of victims' families, had sought the death penalty, the court instead sentenced him to life imprisonment on account of his remorse and mental instability. Kim died of a chronic illness in prison on August 31, 2004, in the city of Jinju, where he had been receiving medical treatment.

In December 2008, the Daegu Safety Theme Park opened. The goal was to educate the inhabitants of Daegu about safety.

== See also ==
- 1995 Baku Metro fire
- Chengdu bus fire
- King's Cross fire
- List of transportation fires
