= Gacheon station =

Train station in South Korea

가천
Gacheon
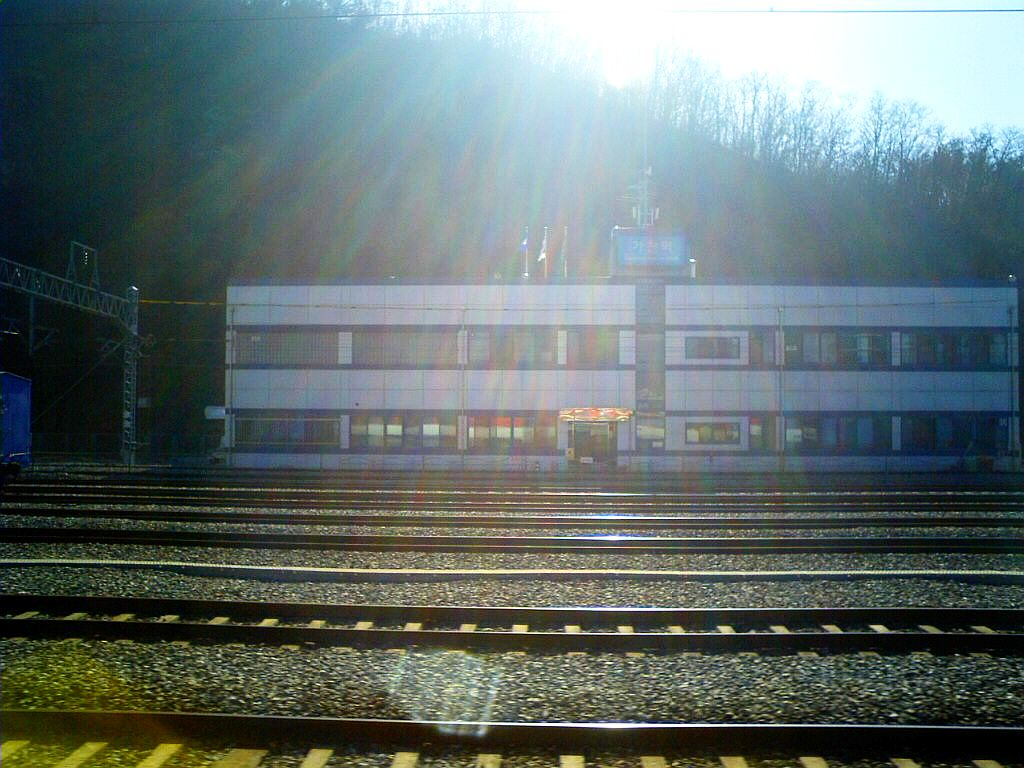

General information
- Location: Gacheon- dong, Suseong- gu, Daegu; South Korea
- Coordinates: 35°51′13″N 128°41′35″E

History
- Opened: 28 October 2005
Location

Gacheon station is a freight-only railway station on the Gyeongbu Line.

- 2005년 11월 1일 : 보통역으로 영업 개시
- 2008년 11월 1일 : 반야월역과 동촌역의 시멘트 수송 기능 인계 및 시멘트용 사일로 구내 설치
