= Nam District, Daegu =

District of Daegu, South Korea

Coordinates: 35.85°N 128.6°E

Nam
- Autonomous District
- Panoramic view of Nam District

- Flag

- Country: South Korea
- Region: Yeongnam
- Provincial level: Daegu
- Administrative divisions: 13 administrative dong

Government
  - Mayor: Cho Jae-gu (조재구)

Area
  - Total: 17.43 km^{2} (6.73 sq mi)

Population (September 2024)
  - Total: 135,957
  - Density: 7,836/km^{2} (20,300/sq mi)
  - Dialect: Gyeongsang
- Website: Nam District Office

Korean name
- Hangul: 남구
- Hanja: 南區
- RR: Nam-gu
- MR: Nam-gu

Administrative divisions

Nam District (Korean: 남구) is a district in central Daegu, South Korea. It borders Dalseong County to the south, Dalseo District to the west, Seo District to the northwest, Jung District to the north, and Suseong District to the east. Hyupsung High School and USFK Camp Walker is located in the area. In contains Kyungbok Middle School.

== Education ==
- Daegu National University of Education
- Keimyung University
- Daegu Catholic University
- Yeungnam University College
