= Dong District, Daegu =

District of Daegu, South Korea

Coordinates: 35.89°N 128.64°E

Dong
- Autonomous District
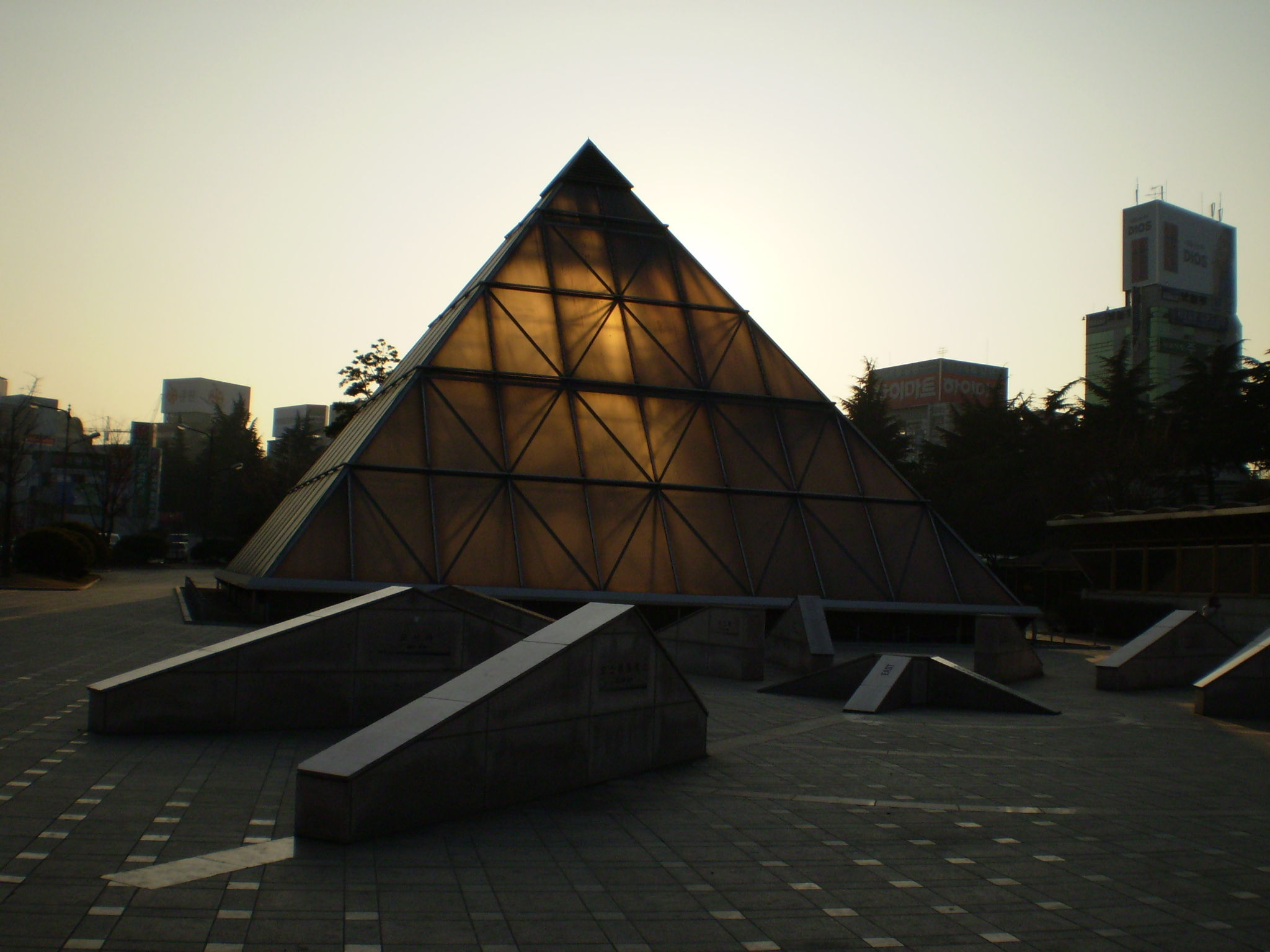

- Flag

- Country: South Korea
- Region: Yeongnam
- Provincial level: Daegu

Area
  - Total: 182.15 km^{2} (70.33 sq mi)

Population (September 2024)
  - Total: 343,398
  - Density: 1,884/km^{2} (4,880/sq mi)
  - Dialect: Gyeongsang
- Website: Dong District Office

Korean name
- Hangul: 동구
- Hanja: 東區
- RR: Dong-gu
- MR: Tong-gu

Dong District (Korean: 동구; lit. 'East District') is a gu (district) in northeastern part of Daegu of South Korea. Daegu itself lies in the southeastern part of the Korean Peninsula. It has a population of 343,678. The district covers 182.35 km^{2}, or about 20% of Daegu's total area.

Dong-gu first emerged as the "eastern district office" (동부출장소) in 1938. It achieved gu status in 1963. In 1998, the administrative divisions were reorganized, and the former 26 dong were reorganized as 20 dong.

== Administrative divisions ==
Administrative divisions

- Ansim-dong
- Bangchon-dong
- Bullobongmu-dong
- Dongchon-dong
- Dopyeong-dong
- Gongsan-dong
- Haean-dong
- Hyomok-dong
- Jijeo-dong
- Sinam-dong
- Sincheon-dong

== Education ==
International schools in Dong-gu include:

- Daegu International School
- Daegu Chinese Elementary School or Korea Daeguhwagyo Elementary School (한국대구화교초등학교)

== Sister cities ==
- Huangshan, China

== See also ==
- Subdivisions of South Korea
- Geography of South Korea
- Dongchon
