= Seolhwa–Myeonggok station =

Station of the Daegu Metro

115 설화명곡 Seolhwa·Myeonggok
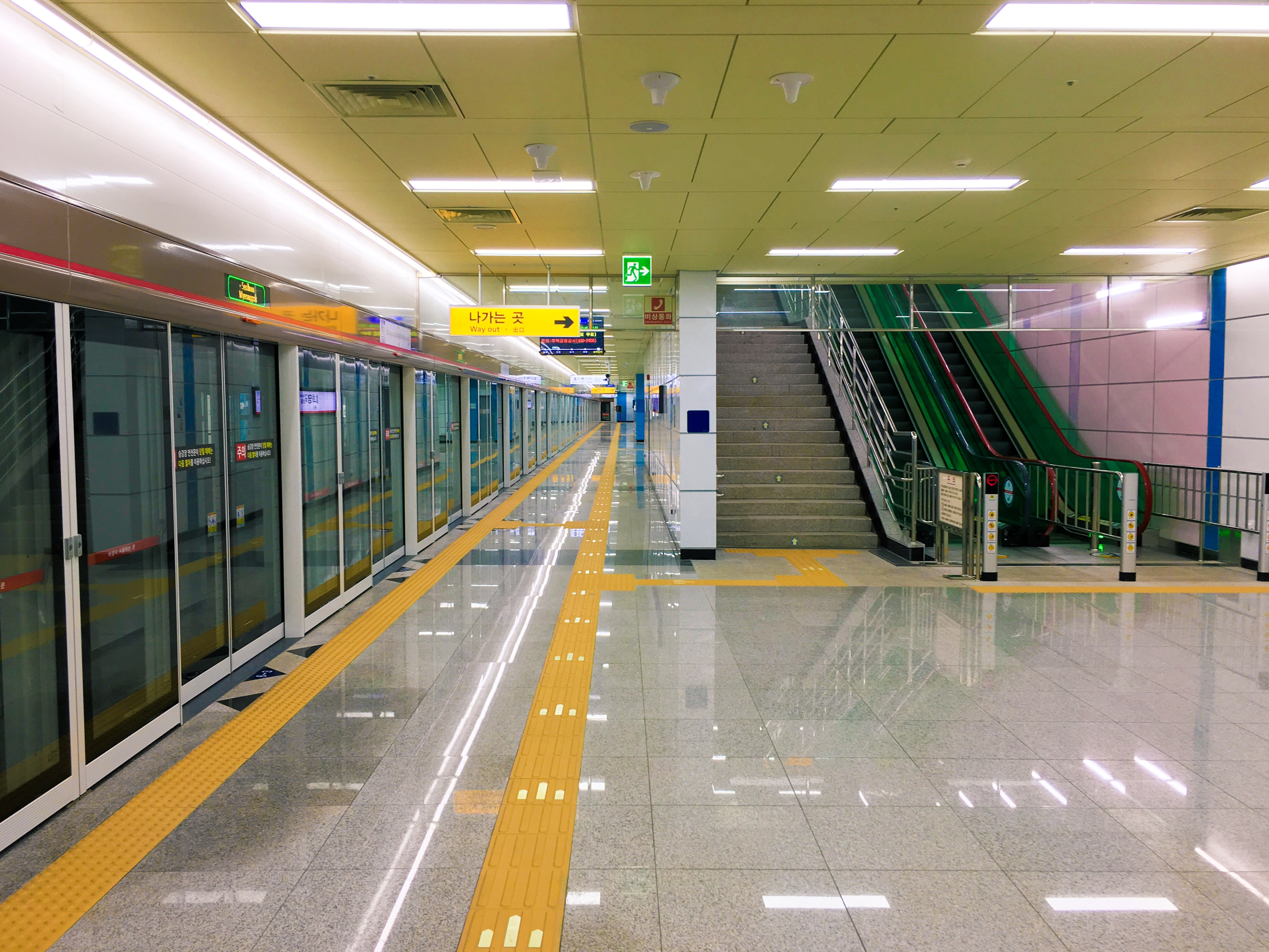
- Station platform

Korean name
- Hangul: 설화명곡역
- Hanja: 舌化椧谷驛
- Revised Romanization: Seolhwamyeonggogyeok
- McCune–Reischauer: Sŏrhwamyŏnggokyŏk

General information
- Location: (562-1 Seolhwa-ri) B2476 Biseul-ro, Hwawon-eup, Dalseong County, Daegu; South Korea
- Coordinates: 35°47′55″N 128°29′22″E
- Operator: DTRO
- Line: Line 1
- Platforms: 2
- Tracks: 2

Construction
- Structure type: Underground

Other information
- Station code: 115

History
- Opened: September 8, 2016

Services
Preceding station	Daegu Metro	Following station
Terminus	Line 1	Hwawon towards Hayang
Location

Seolhwa·Myeonggok Station is an underground station of the Daegu Metro Line 1 in Dalseong County Daegu, South Korea. This station is a southern terminus of Line 1. The station was opened on September 8, 2016, by the opening of the west extension between Seolhwa–Myeonggok and Daegok.

== Station name ==
The Seolhwa·Myeonggok Station is a name that combines the two names of Seolhwa-ri and Myeonggok-ri. (Note: There was a dispute over the name of the station before the station was created, and the residents of Seolhwa-ri insisted that it should be called "Sulwha Station" because it is located in Seolhwa-ri. He insisted that he should say "Myeonggok Station". When two villagers confronted each other over this station name, Daegu Metropolitan Rapid Transit Corporation finally named the station name as "Seolhwa·Myeonggok Station," which merged the two names using the arguments of both sides.) In the case of Seolhwa, there were many apricot trees growing in the village in the past. When spring comes, the apricot blossoms are like snowflakes, so they were called Seolhwa. It was written as Seo (舌化), and it became the current narrative, and in the case of Myeonggok, the village was located in a valley and its shape was long and narrow like a home, so it was called Myeonggok.

== Station layout ==
G	Street Level
L1	Concourse	Faregates, Ticketing Machines, Station Control
L2; Platforms	Side platform, doors will open on the right
L2; Platforms	Southbound	← Line 1 Alighting Passengers Only
L2; Platforms	Northbound	→ Line 1 toward Hayang (Hwawon) →
L2; Platforms	Side platform, doors will open on the right

== List of exits ==
There are 8 exits at this station:

Exit No.	Image	Destinations
1		Nonghyup Mall Dalseong Store
2		Dalseong-gun Women Culture Welfare Center; Okpo-myeon, Nongong-eup; Hyeonpung-myeon; Seongsan-myeon; Hwawon-Okpo IC
3		Hwawon High School
4		Myeonggokjigu Entrance
5		Myeonggokjigu
6		Dalseong Middle School
7		Myeonggok-ri; Seongsan-ri; Hwawon Grand Mansion; Hwawon Taewang Town
8		Seongcheon Bridge
