= Daegu Line =

Railway line in South Korea

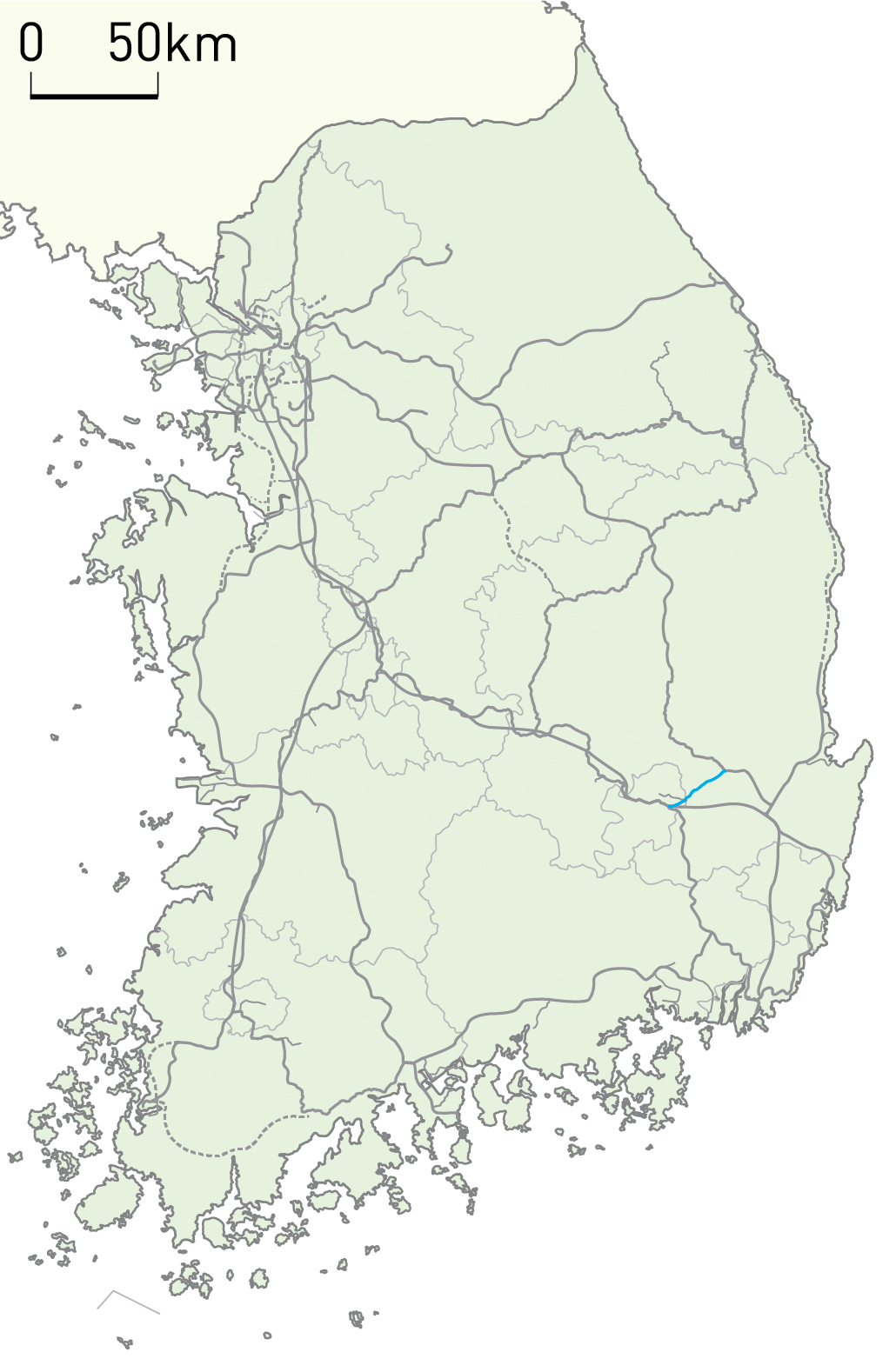

Overview
- Native name: 대구선(大邱線)
- Status: Operational
- Owner: Korea National Railway
- Locale: Daegu; North Gyeongsang
- Termini: Gacheon; Yeongcheon
- Stations: 8

Service
- Type: Heavy rail, Passenger/freight rail Regional rail, Intercity rail
- Operator(s): Korail

History
- Opened: Stages between 1917–1918

Technical
- Line length: 29.0 km (18.0 mi)
- Number of tracks: Double track
- Track gauge: 1,435 mm (4 ft 8 1/2 in) standard gauge

- Daegu Line
- Hangul: 대구선
- Hanja: 大邱線
- RR: Daeguseon
- MR: Taegusŏn

The Daegu Line (Korean: 대구선) is a railway line in South Korea. The line connects Gacheon station on the Gyeongbu Line in Daegu to Yeongcheon on the Jungang Line. The line is served by frequent passenger trains between Seoul (via the Gyeongbu Line), Dongdaegu, and Gyeongju, Pohang and Ulsan (via the Jungang and Donghae Nambu Lines).

== History ==
The first section of the Daegu Line was opened in 1917, between Daegu and Hayang. The line was extended to the Haksan station in Pohang until 1919 as follows:

Date	Section	Length
1 November 1917	Daegu–Hayang	23.0 km
1 September 1918	Hayang–Gyeongju	46.0 km
31 October 1918	Gyeongju–Pohang	36.4 km
27 June 1919	Pohang–Haksan	2.0 km

A branch was opened from Gyeongju to Ulsan on October 25, 1921.

The sections from Gyeongju to Pohang and Ulsan were integrated into the Donghae Nambu Line on December 16, 1935. On 1 July 1938 the reconstruction of the section Daegu–Yeongcheon was complete with the standard gauge. On 1 December 1938 the section Yeongcheon–Gyeongju became a part of the Gyeonggyeong Nambu Line (the southern part of the Jungang Line), which was established on April 1, 1942. At the same time the present section was renamed the Daegu Line.

=== Upgrade ===
The 14 km (8.7 mi) section from Dongdaegu to Cheongcheon was replaced by a new alignment that takes the Daegu Line to meet the Gyeongbu Line at Gacheon, lengthening the Dongdaegu–Cheongcheon line distance to 16.5 km (10.3 mi). The Dongdaegu to Cheongcheon rail distance changed to 38.4 km (23.9 mi), line proper from Gacheon to Yeongcheon is 29.0 km (18.0 mi) long. The project was launched in August 1997 with a planned completion in 2000, but economic difficulties and planning changes delayed completion, the line relocation was finally inaugurated on November 3, 2005. Part of the project was the replacement of a 1.3 km (0.81 mi) branch to Daegu Airport from the old alignment with a 9.04 km (5.62 mi) spur line paralleling the highway west from Cheongcheon to the airport, finished a year later.

The Daegu Line was considered for an upgrade to a double-tracked, electrified railway in a straighter, 34.9 km (21.7 mi) long alignment from 2000. Detailed plans were prepared by 2009, the foreseen budget was 988.042 billion won, and the completion of the project was set for 2017. On September 1, 2010, the South Korean government announced a strategic plan to reduce travel times from Seoul to 95% of the country to under 2 hours by 2020. As part of the plan, the Daegu Line is to be set out for 230 km/h and may see KTX service. On 28 December 2021, electrification was completed.

== See also ==
- Korail
- Transportation in South Korea

== Bibliography ==
- Japanese Government Railways (1937), 鉄道停車場一覧. 昭和12年10月1日現在 (List of stations as of 1 October 1937), Kawaguchi Printing Company, Tokyo, pp 493–494
