= National Route 30 (South Korea) =

Road in South Korea

National Route 30
- 국도 제30호선

Route information
- Length: 355.1 km (220.6 mi)
- Existed: 14 March 1981–present

Major junctions
- West end: Buan, North Jeolla Province
- East end: Seo District, Daegu

Location
- Country: South Korea

Highway system
- Highway systems of South Korea; Expressways; National; Local

National Route 30 is a national highway in South Korea that connects Buan to Daegu. It was established on 14 March 1981.

== History ==
- March 14, 1981: New establishment of National Route 30 Bunsan–Daegu Line.
- May 8, 1981: Opening of 89.7 km section from Deoksan-dong, Daedeok-myeon, Geumneung County to Daeshin-dong, Jung-gu, Daegu. Upgraded to a national road.
- May 30, 1981: Road zone designated for new 333 km section following revision of Presidential Decree No. 10247 (General National Route Designation Decree).
- May 13, 1986: Terminus changed from 'Daegu City, Gyeongsangbuk-do' to 'Seo-gu, Daegu Directly Governed City'.
- August 1992: Extension of 11.4 km from Janggeum-ri, Sannae-myeon, Jeongeup County, Jeollabuk-do to Hoemun-ri, Deokchi-myeon, Imsil County and opening of Janggeum Tunnel.
- May 17, 1993: Opening of 3.1 km section of Sintaein Bypass Road (Shinyong-ri to Baeksan-ri, Sintaein-eup, Jeongeup County).
- 1994: Opening of Bullochi Tunnel in Jinan County and Jogeumjae Tunnel in Muju County.
- July 1, 1996: Terminus changed from 'Seo-gu, Daegu Directly Governed City' to 'Seo-gu, Daegu Metropolitan City'.
- February 1997: Reconstruction and opening of 570 m Palwang Bridge (Hajang-ri, Dongjin-myeon to Geumpan-ri, Baeksan-myeon, Buan County).
- December 19, 1997: Opening of 3.85 km section of Jinan Bypass Road (Gunha-ri to Gunsang-ri, Jinan-eup, Jinan County).
- December 10, 1999: Opening of 320 m Gunpo Bridge (Yonggye-ri, Baeksan-myeon, Buan County).
- May 4, 2000: Expansion and opening of 13.578 km section from Doseong-ri, Seonnam-myeon, Seongju County, Gyeongsangbuk-do to Pasan-dong, Dalseo-gu, Daegu Metropolitan City.
- October 31, 2001: Relocation of 13.52 km section due to construction of Yongdam Dam in Jinan County, Jeollabuk-do (Unsan-ri, Jinan-eup to Baekhwa-ri, Ancheon-myeon).
- December 30, 2008: Expansion and opening of 4.4 km section from Sacheon-ri, Jeoksang-myeon to Gaok-ri, Muju-eup, Muju County; existing section abolished.
- April 1, 2009: Expansion and opening of ~1.1 km section from Naegi-ri, Dongjin-myeon to Sinun-ri, Buan-eup, Buan County.
- September 29, 2009: Expansion and opening of 580 m Gangchang Bridge (Jukgok-ri, Dasa-eup, Dalseong-gun to Paho-dong, Dalseo-gu, Daegu Metropolitan City).
- December 30, 2009: Expansion and opening of 2.87 km Bunsan Bypass (Mapo-ri to Jiseo-ri, Bunsan-myeon, Buan County); existing 1.45 km section abolished.
- July 21, 2010: Expansion and opening of 7.11 km section from Gungsa-ri, Taein-myeon to Maejeong-ri, Ongdong-myeon, Jeongeup City; existing 5.7 km section abolished.
- September 2011: Opening of section from Naegi-ri, Dongjin-myeon, Buan County to Sinun-ri, Buan-eup.
- January 20, 2012: Temporary opening of 7.0 km section of Buan–Taein Road Section 2 (Shindeok-ri, Shintaein-eup, Jeongeup to Gungsa-ri, Taein-myeon).
- July 28, 2012: Expansion and opening of 1.42 km section of Buan–Taein Road Section 2 (Hwaho-ri to Shindeok-ri, Shintaein-eup, Jeongeup).
- September 26, 2012: Expansion and opening of 3.44 km section from Hajang-ri, Dongjin-myeon, Buan County to Yonggye-ri, Baeksan-myeon.
- November 12, 2012: Upgrading and opening of 3.94 km Mupung Bypass (Hyeonnae-ri to Jiseong-ri, Mupung-myeon, Muju County); existing 4.8 km section abolished.
- August 1, 2013: Expansion and opening of 2.1 km section of Buan–Taein Road Section 1 (Sinun-ri, Buan-eup to Hajang-ri, Dongjin-myeon, Buan County).
- May 13, 2014: Expansion and opening of 1.5 km section of Buan–Taein Road (Okjeong-ri, Bulyang-myeon, Gimje City to Hwaho-ri, Shintaein-eup, Jeongeup City).
- May 29, 2014: Expansion and opening of 3.9 km Cheongung Bypass (Baekryeon-ri, Gangjin-myeon, Imsil County to Okjeon-ri, Cheongung-myeon); existing 3.6 km section abolished.
- July 1, 2016: Temporary opening of 1.8 km section of Gyeokpo–Haseo Road (Bangpo Intersection to Saemangeum Gas Station, Daehang-ri, Byeonsan-myeon, Buan County).
- July 15, 2016: Temporary opening of 2.0 km section of Gyeokpo–Haseo Road (Byunsan Intersection to Bangpo Intersection, Jiseo-ri to Daehang-ri, Buan County).
- December 9, 2016: Expansion and opening of 11.64 km section of Jinan–Jeoksang Road Section 2 (Noseong-ri, Ancheon-myeon, Jinan County to Sacheon-ri, Jeoksang-myeon, Muju County); existing 12.04 km section abolished.
- December 19, 2016: Temporary opening of 3.09 km section of Gyeokpo–Haseo Road (Sogwang Intersection to Baekryeon Intersection, Baekryeon-ri, Haseo-myeon, Buan County).
- April 30, 2017: Temporary opening of 5.26 km section of Jinan–Jeoksang Road Section 1 (Guryong-ri to Unsan-ri, Jinan-eup, Jinan County).
- December 22, 2017: Expansion and opening of 8.8 km section of Gyeokpo–Haseo Road (Jiseo-ri, Byeonsan-myeon to Baekryeon-ri, Haseo-myeon, Buan County); existing 9.4 km section abolished.
- December 26, 2017: Expansion and opening of 8.41 km section of Jinan–Jeoksang Road Section 1 (Banwol-ri to Unsan-ri, Jinan-eup, Jinan County); existing section abolished.
- June 30, 2021: Improvement and opening of 7.08 km section of Taein–Sannae Road (Maejeong-ri, Ongdong-myeon, Jeongeup to Sisan-ri, Chilbo-myeon).
- July 2, 2021: Improvement and opening of 12.1 km section of Jinan–Seongsu Road Section 2 (Deokhyeon-ri, Baegun-myeon, Jinan County to Dongchon-ri, Maryeong-myeon).

== Main stopovers ==
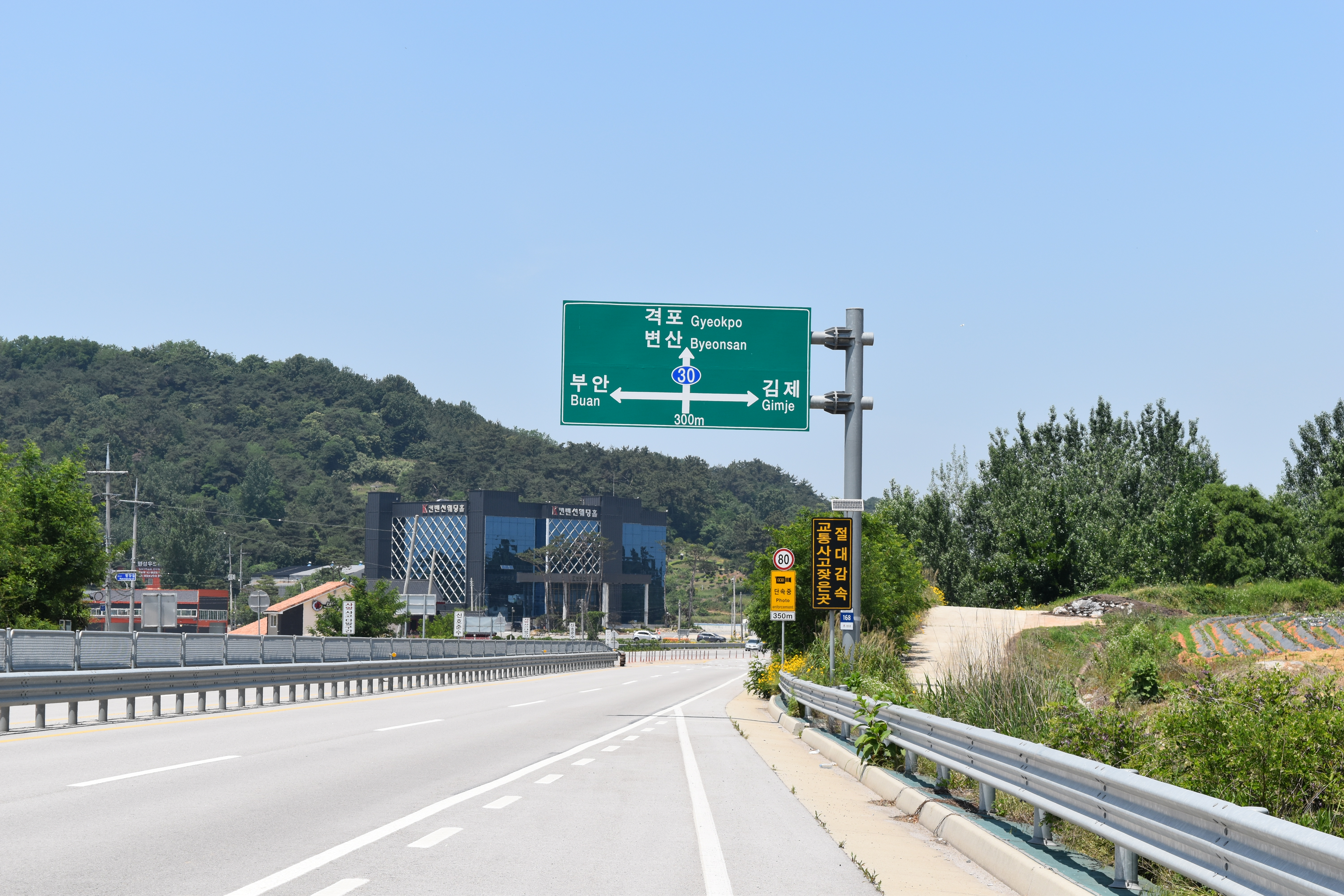
National Route 30 at Buan County

North Jeolla Province

- Buan County - Gimje - Jeongeup - Imsil County - Jinan County - Muju County

North Gyeongsang Province

- Gimcheon - Seongju County - Gimcheon - Seongju County

Daegu

- Dalseong County - Dalseo District - Seo District

== Major intersections ==
- (■): Motorway

IS: Intersection, IC: Interchange

=== North Jeolla Province ===
Name	Hangul name	Connection	Location		Note
Yeongjeon IS	영전사거리	National Route 23 (Buan-ro); Yeongjeon-gil	Buan County	Boan-myeon	Terminus
Buan Celadon Museum	부안청자박물관		Buan County	Boan-myeon	
Yeondong IS	연동삼거리	Beteuljae-ro	Buan County	Jinseo-myeon	
Gomso Intercity Bus Terminal Jinseo-myeon Office Byeonsan Middle School	곰소시외버스터미널 진서면사무소 변산중학교		Buan County	Jinseo-myeon	
Seokpo IS	석포삼거리	Naesosa-ro	Buan County	Jinseo-myeon	
Madong IS	마동삼거리	Prefectural Route 736 (Bongnae-ro)	Buan County	Jinseo-myeon	
Eonpo IS	언포 교차로	Gyeokpo-ro; Gunghang-ro	Buan County	Byeonsan-myeon	National Route 77 overlap
Docheong IS	도청 교차로	Gyeokpo-ro	Buan County	Byeonsan-myeon	National Route 77 overlap
Gyeokpo IS	격포 교차로	Gyeokpo-ro	Buan County	Byeonsan-myeon	National Route 77 overlap
Jongam IS	종암 교차로	Gyeokpo-ro; Mapo-ro	Buan County	Byeonsan-myeon	National Route 77 overlap
Mapo IS	마포 교차로	Prefectural Route 736 (Mapo-ro)	Buan County	Byeonsan-myeon	National Route 77 overlap Prefectural Route 736 overlap
Unsan IS	운산 교차로	Prefectural Route 736 (Jiseo-ro); Byeonsanhaebyeon-ro	Buan County	Byeonsan-myeon	National Route 77 overlap Prefectural Route 736 overlap
Byeonsan IS	변산 교차로	Jiseo-ro	Buan County	Byeonsan-myeon	National Route 77 overlap
Byeonsan Beach	변산해수욕장		Buan County	Byeonsan-myeon	National Route 77 overlap
Saemangeum IS	새만금 교차로	National Route 77 (Saemangeum-ro)	Buan County	Byeonsan-myeon	National Route 77 overlap
Mukjeong IS	묵정삼거리	Buandaem-ro	Buan County	Byeonsan-myeon	
Byeonsan Bridge	변산교		Buan County	Byeonsan-myeon	
Byeonsan Bridge			Buan County	Haseo-myeon	
Baekryeon IS	백련 교차로	Byeonsan-ro	Buan County	Haseo-myeon	
Jangsin IS	장신 교차로	Prefectural Route 705 (Seokbul-ro)	Buan County	Haseo-myeon	
Cheongho IS	청호 교차로	Yeongseong-ro	Buan County	Haseo-myeon	
Sinheung Bridge	신흥교		Buan County	Haengan-myeon	
Sinheung IS	신흥 교차로	Saepo-ro	Buan County	Haengan-myeon	
Gungan IS	궁안 교차로	Sunhwanbung-ro	Buan County	Haengan-myeon	
Geomam IS	검암 교차로	Yeomso-ro	Buan County	Haengan-myeon	
Bonghwang IS	봉황 교차로	National Route 23; Prefectural Route 705 (Buan-ro)	Buan County	Dongjin-myeon	
Sinun IS	신운 교차로	Gomaje-ro	Buan County	Dongjin-myeon	
No name	(이름 없음)	Maechang-ro	Buan County	Dongjin-myeon	
Hajang IS	하장 교차로	Sunhwannam-ro	Buan County	Dongjin-myeon	
Buan IC	부안 나들목	Seohaean Expressway	Buan County	Dongjin-myeon	
Palwang IS	팔왕 교차로	Prefectural Route 747 (Deoksin-ro)	Buan County	Dongjin-myeon	
No name	(이름 없음)	Imhyeon-ro	Buan County	Baeksan-myeon	
Baeksan IS	백산 교차로	National Route 29 (Buryeong-ro)	Buan County	Baeksan-myeon	National Route 29 overlap
Gunpo Bridge	군포교		Buan County	Baeksan-myeon	National Route 29 overlap
Gunpo Bridge			Gimje City	Buryang-myeon	National Route 29 overlap
Okjeong IS	옥정삼거리	Prefectural Route 711 (Jukbaeng-ro)	Gimje City	Buryang-myeon	National Route 29 overlap
Hwaho IS	화호 교차로	National Route 29 (Byeokgolje-ro)	Jeongeup City	Sintaein-eup	National Route 29 overlap
Yanggoe IS	양괴 교차로	Seokji-ro	Jeongeup City	Sintaein-eup	
Yangdeok IS	양덕 교차로	Sintaeinbuk-gil	Jeongeup City	Sintaein-eup	
Taehwa IS	태화 교차로	Prefectural Route 736 (Gamgok-ro)	Jeongeup City	Sintaein-eup	
Gungsa IS	궁사 교차로	Seokji-ro	Jeongeup City	Taein-myeon	Connected with Taein IC
Obong IS	오봉 교차로	Taeindongseo-ro	Jeongeup City	Taein-myeon	
Wangnim IS	왕림 교차로	National Route 1 National Route 21 (Jeongeup-daero)	Jeongeup City	Taein-myeon	
Gocheon IS (Taein IS)	고천 교차로 (태인삼거리)	Jeongeupbuk-ro	Jeongeup City	Taein-myeon	
Hangga Tunnel	항가터널		Jeongeup City	Taein-myeon	Right tunnel: Approximately 305m Left tunnel: Approximately 402m
Maedang IS	매당 교차로	Taesan-ro	Jeongeup City	Ongdong-myeon	
Sanseong Clinic	산성보건진료소		Jeongeup City	Ongdong-myeon	
No name	(이름 없음)	Bitjae-ro	Jeongeup City	Ongdong-myeon	
Bibong Bridge	비봉교		Jeongeup City	Ongdong-myeon	
Bibong Bridge			Jeongeup City	Chilbo-myeon	
Wau IS	와우삼거리	Chilbojungang-ro	Jeongeup City	Chilbo-myeon	
Chilbo IS	칠보삼거리	Chilbuk-ro	Jeongeup City	Chilbo-myeon	
Sisan IS	시산삼거리	Chilbojungang-ro	Jeongeup City	Chilbo-myeon	
Sisan IS	시산 교차로	Prefectural Route 49; Prefectural Route 55 (Jeongeupwanjugan-doro)	Jeongeup City	Chilbo-myeon	Prefectural Route 55 overlap
Bokho IS	복호삼거리	Sanoe-ro	Jeongeup City	Chilbo-myeon	Prefectural Route 55 overlap
Gujeoljae	구절재		Jeongeup City	Chilbo-myeon	Prefectural Route 55 overlap
Gujeoljae			Jeongeup City	Sannae-myeon	Prefectural Route 55 overlap
Sannae IS	산내사거리	Prefectural Route 55; Prefectural Route 715 (Cheongjeong-ro)	Jeongeup City	Sannae-myeon	Prefectural Route 55 overlap
Sannae Bridge	산내교		Jeongeup City	Sannae-myeon	
(Pyeongnae Entrance)	(평내입구)	Prefectural Route 729 (Janggeum-gil)	Jeongeup City	Sannae-myeon	
Janggeum Bridge	장금교		Jeongeup City	Sannae-myeon	
Janggeum Tunnel	장금터널		Jeongeup City	Sannae-myeon	Approximately 370m
Seomjin River Dam	섬진강댐		Jeongeup City	Sannae-myeon	
Baekjeosewol Bridge	백여세월교 남단	Okjeongho-ro	Imsil County	Gangjin-myeon	
Hoemun IS	회문삼거리	Indeok-ro	Imsil County	Deokchi-myeon	Connected with National Route 27
Gangjin Bridge	강진교		Imsil County	Deokchi-myeon	
Gangjin Bridge			Imsil County	Gangjin-myeon	
No name	(이름 없음)	Prefectural Route 717 (Okjeongho-ro)	Imsil County	Gangjin-myeon	Prefectural Route 717 overlap
Seomjin Middle School	섬진중학교		Imsil County	Gangjin-myeon	Prefectural Route 717 overlap
Gangjin IS	강진사거리	Prefectural Route 717 (Gangdong-ro); Gangul-ro	Imsil County	Gangjin-myeon	Prefectural Route 717 overlap
Gangjin Public Bus Terminal	강진공용버스터미널		Imsil County	Gangjin-myeon	
Gangjin IS	강진삼거리	Galdam1-gil	Imsil County	Gangjin-myeon	
Gangjin-myeon Office Galdam Elementary School	강진면사무소 갈담초등학교		Imsil County	Gangjin-myeon	
Imsil National Cemetery	호국용사묘지 (국립임실호국원)		Imsil County	Gangjin-myeon	
Baekryeon IS	백련 교차로	Cheongung-ro	Imsil County	Gangjin-myeon	
Singi Bridge	신기교		Imsil County	Gangjin-myeon	
Hapjuk Bridge	합죽교		Imsil County	Cheongung-myeon	
Cheongung IS	청웅 교차로	Gugo 6-gil Baetgon-ro; Seokjeon-ro	Imsil County	Cheongung-myeon	
Haengchon Bridge Myeongdong Bridge	행촌교 명동교		Imsil County	Cheongung-myeon	
Okjeon IS	옥전 교차로	Cheongung-ro	Imsil County	Cheongung-myeon	
Jangjae IS	장재삼거리	Sinan-ro	Imsil County	Imsil-eup	
Jeongwol IS	정월삼거리	Prefectural Route 745 (Imsam-ro)	Imsil County	Imsil-eup	Prefectural Route 745 overlap
Ojeong IS	오정삼거리	Bonghwang-ro	Imsil County	Imsil-eup	Prefectural Route 745 overlap
Imsil County Public Stadium	임실군공설운동장		Imsil County	Imsil-eup	Prefectural Route 745 overlap
Sangtong IS	상통사거리	Gamcheon-ro; Unsu-ro	Imsil County	Imsil-eup	Prefectural Route 745 overlap
Imsil County Medical Center Imsil Police Station Imsil Sport Hall	임실군보건의료원 임실경찰서 임실군민체육회관		Imsil County	Imsil-eup	Prefectural Route 745 overlap
Seongga IS	성가삼거리	Prefectural Route 745 (Sujeong-ro)	Imsil County	Imsil-eup	Prefectural Route 745 overlap
Imsilgalma IS	임실갈마사거리	Galma-ro; Galma 1-gil	Imsil County	Imsil-eup	
Imsil IC (Imsil IS)	임실 나들목 (임실 교차로)	Suncheon–Wanju Expressway; National Route 17 (Chunhyang-ro)	Imsil County	Imsil-eup	National Route 17 overlap
Wolpyeong IS	월평 교차로	National Route 17 (Chunhyang-ro)	Imsil County	Seongsu-myeon	National Route 17 overlap
Seongsu Elementary School Yangji Bus Stop Seongsu-myeon Office	성수초등학교 양지정류소 성수면사무소		Imsil County	Seongsu-myeon	
Pyeongji IS	평지삼거리	Prefectural Route 721 (Sanseong-ro)	Imsil County	Seongsu-myeon	
Ojeong IS	오정삼거리	Prefectural Route 742 (Seongbaek-ro)	Jinan County	Baegun-myeon	Prefectural Route 742 overlap
Deokhyeon IS	덕현삼거리	Deokhyeon-ro	Jinan County	Baegun-myeon	Prefectural Route 742 overlap
Dongchang IS	동창삼거리	Prefectural Route 742 (Baekjang-ro)	Jinan County	Baegun-myeon	Prefectural Route 742 overlap
Baegun Junior High School Baegun Bus Stop Baegun-myeon Office Baegun Health Center	백운중학교 백운정류소 백운면사무소 백운보건지소		Jinan County	Baegun-myeon	
Baegun IS	백운삼거리	Baegundong-ro	Jinan County	Baegun-myeon	
Ungyo IS	운교삼거리	Ungye-ro	Jinan County	Baegun-myeon	
Jeongsong IS	정송삼거리	Pyeongga-ro	Jinan County	Baegun-myeon	
Maryoung High School	마령고등학교		Jinan County	Maryeong-myeon	
Pyeongji IS	평지삼거리	Imjil-ro	Jinan County	Maryeong-myeon	
Pyeongji IS	평지사거리	Seopyeong-ro	Jinan County	Maryeong-myeon	
Maryeong IS	마령사거리	Imjil-ro	Jinan County	Maryeong-myeon	
Hwajeon IS	화전삼거리	Maisannam-ro	Jinan County	Maryeong-myeon	
Dongchon Bridge	동촌교		Jinan County	Maryeong-myeon	
Dongchon Bridge			Jinan County	Jinan-eup	
Euncheon IS	은천삼거리	Pyeongga-ro	Jinan County	Jinan-eup	
Jinan IC	진안 나들목	Iksan–Pohang Expressway	Jinan County	Jinan-eup	
Jinan Rotary	진안로터리	Prefectural Route 795 (Jungang-ro); Maisan-ro; Jinmu-ro	Jinan County	Jinan-eup	
Jinan IS	진안 교차로	National Route 26 (Jeonjin-ro)	Jinan County	Jinan-eup	National Route 26 overlap
Jinyang Overpass	진양육교		Jinan County	Jinan-eup	National Route 26 overlap
Wolrang IS	월랑 교차로	Jinmu-ro	Jinan County	Jinan-eup	National Route 26 overlap
Guryong IS	구룡 교차로	National Route 26 (Jeonjin-ro)	Jinan County	Jinan-eup	National Route 26 overlap
Mokgol IS	목골삼거리	Jinmu-ro	Jinan County	Jinan-eup	
Junggye IS Sinheung IS	중계삼거리 신흥 교차로	Soejinggye-ro	Jinan County	Jinan-eup	
Hado IS	하도 교차로	Mulgok-ro	Jinan County	Jinan-eup	
Songdae IS Geombuk IS	송대삼거리 검북 교차로	Geombuk-ro	Jinan County	Jinan-eup	
Unsan IS Sangjeon IS	운산삼거리 상전 교차로	Eongeon-ro	Jinan County	Jinan-eup	
Eongeon IS Donghyang IS	언건 교차로 동향 교차로	Prefectural Route 49 (Jinseong-ro)	Jinan County	Jinan-eup	Prefectural Route 49 overlap
Sudong Tunnel	수동터널		Jinan County	Sangjeon-myeon	Prefectural Route 49 overlap Approximately 350m
Geumji IS	금지 교차로	Prefectural Route 49 (Gwisang-ro)	Jinan County	Sangjeon-myeon	Prefectural Route 49 overlap
Wolpo Bridge	월포대교		Jinan County	Sangjeon-myeon	
Sangjeon Cemetery	상전망향의 광장		Jinan County	Sangjeon-myeon	
Yongpyeong Bridge	용평대교		Jinan County	Sangjeon-myeon	
Guryong IS	구룡 교차로	Geumdang-gil	Jinan County	Sangjeon-myeon	
Bulruchi Tunnel	불로치터널		Jinan County	Sangjeon-myeon	Approximately 440m
Bulruchi Tunnel			Jinan County	Ancheon-myeon	Approximately 440m
Singoe IS	신괴 교차로	National Route 13 (Jasin-ro)	Jinan County	Ancheon-myeon	National Route 13 overlap
Noseong IS	노성 교차로	Jano-ro	Jinan County	Ancheon-myeon	National Route 13 overlap
Ancheon Bus Terminal Ancheon-myeon Office	안천터미널 안천면사무소		Jinan County	Ancheon-myeon	National Route 13 overlap
Bohan IS	보한삼거리	Bohan-gil	Jinan County	Ancheon-myeon	National Route 13 overlap
Baekhwa IS Baekhwa IS	백화삼거리 백화 교차로	National Route 13 (Anyong-ro)	Jinan County	Ancheon-myeon	National Route 13 overlap
Ancheon Elementary School Ancheon Middle School Ancheon High School	안천초등학교 안천중학교 안천고등학교		Jinan County	Ancheon-myeon	
Jangan Bridge	장안교		Muju County	Bunam-myeon	
Jangan IS	장안 교차로	Prefectural Route 635 (Norujae-ro) (Bunam-ro)	Muju County	Bunam-myeon	
Gorochi	고로치		Muju County	Bunam-myeon	
Gorochi			Muju County	Jeoksang-myeon	
Samyu IS	삼유삼거리	Sambang-ro	Muju County	Jeoksang-myeon	
Jogeumjae Tunnel	조금재터널		Muju County	Jeoksang-myeon	Approximately 430m
Yongdam IS	용담삼거리	Samga-ro	Muju County	Jeoksang-myeon	
Jeoksang Middle School	적상중학교		Muju County	Jeoksang-myeon	
Jeoksang IS	적상 교차로	National Route 19 (Muju-ro)	Muju County	Jeoksang-myeon	National Route 19 overlap
Sacheon IS	사천 교차로	Gurigol-ro	Muju County	Jeoksang-myeon	National Route 19 overlap
Jeoksangsan Tunnel	적상산터널		Muju County	Jeoksang-myeon	National Route 19 overlap Right tunnel: Approximately 433m Left tunnel: Approximately 485m
Gilwang IS	길왕 교차로	Jeoksangsan-ro	Muju County	Jeoksang-myeon	National Route 19 overlap
Jeoksangsan Bridge	적상산교		Muju County	Jeoksang-myeon	National Route 19 overlap
Jeoksangsan Bridge			Muju County	Muju-eup	National Route 19 overlap
Jeoksang Tunnel	적상터널		Muju County	Muju-eup	National Route 19 overlap Approximately 80m
Muju IC (Garim IS)	무주 나들목 (가림 교차로)	Tongyeong–Daejeon Expressway; Jeoksangsan-ro	Muju County	Muju-eup	National Route 19 overlap
Gaok IS	가옥 교차로	National Route 37 (Mugeum-ro)	Muju County	Muju-eup	National Route 19, National Route 37 overlap
Ssarijae Tunnel	싸리재터널		Muju County	Muju-eup	National Route 19, National Route 37 overlap Approximately 385m
Dangsan IS	당산 교차로	Hanpungru-ro	Muju County	Muju-eup	National Route 19, National Route 37 overlap
Muju 1 IS	무주1 교차로	National Route 19 (Muju-ro); Prefectural Route 727 (Goemok-ro) (Hanpungru-ro)	Muju County	Muju-eup	National Route 19, National Route 37 overlap
Chilri 1 Bridge Chilri 2 Bridge	칠리1교 칠리2교		Muju County	Muju-eup	National Route 19, National Route 37 overlap
Muju 2 IS	무주2 교차로	National Route 19 (Muju-ro); Museol-ro	Muju County	Muju-eup	National Route 19, National Route 37 overlap
Jangbaek Bridge	장백교		Muju County	Muju-eup	National Route 37 overlap
No name	(이름 없음)	Sangjangbaek-gil	Muju County	Muju-eup	National Route 37 overlap
Muhang IS	무항삼거리	Prefectural Route 49; Prefectural Route 581 (Minjujisan-ro)	Muju County	Seolcheon-myeon	National Route 37 overlap Prefectural Route 49 overlap
Muju BandiLand Seolcheon Bus Terminal Seolcheon Elementary School Seolcheon-myeon Office	무주반디랜드 설천공용터미널 설천초등학교 설천면사무소		Muju County	Seolcheon-myeon	National Route 37 overlap Prefectural Route 49 overlap
Rajetongmun IS	라제통문삼거리	National Route 37; Prefectural Route 49 (Gucheondong-ro)	Muju County	Seolcheon-myeon	National Route 37 overlap Prefectural Route 49 overlap
Najetongmun	나제통문		Muju County	Seolcheon-myeon	
Hyeonnae IS	현내 교차로	Hyeonnae-ro	Muju County	Mupung-myeon	
Mupung IS	무풍사거리	Prefectural Route 1089 (Daedeoksan-ro)	Muju County	Mupung-myeon	
Mupung Tunnel	무풍터널		Muju County	Mupung-myeon	Approximately 845m
Geumpyeong IS	금평 교차로	Hyeonnae-ro	Muju County	Mupung-myeon	
Deoksanjae	덕산재		Muju County	Mupung-myeon	Elevation 644m Continuation into North Gyeongsang Province

=== North Gyeongsang Province ===
Name	Hangul name	Connection	Location		Note
Deoksanjae	덕산재		Gimcheon City	Daedeok-myeon	Elevation 644m North Jeolla Province - North Gyeongsang Province border line
Yeonhwa Clinic Daedeok Middle School	연화보건진료소 대덕중학교		Gimcheon City	Daedeok-myeon	
Gwangi IS	관기삼거리	National Route 3 (Namgimcheon-daero)	Gimcheon City	Daedeok-myeon	National Route 3 overlap
Daedeok-myeon Office	대덕면사무소		Gimcheon City	Daedeok-myeon	National Route 3 overlap
Daedeok IS	대덕삼거리	National Route 3 (Namgimcheon-daero)	Gimcheon City	Daedeok-myeon	National Route 3 overlap
Churyang Bridge	추량교		Gimcheon City	Daedeok-myeon	
Gareutjae	가릇재		Gimcheon City	Daedeok-myeon	
Gareutjae			Gimcheon City	Jeungsan-myeon	
Jeungsan-myeon Office Jeungsan Health Center	증산면사무소 증산보건지소		Gimcheon City	Jeungsan-myeon	
Jeungsan IS	증산삼거리	Prefectural Route 903 (Jeungsan 1-ro)	Gimcheon City	Jeungsan-myeon	Prefectural Route 903 overlap
Okdong Bridge	옥동교		Gimcheon City	Jeungsan-myeon	Prefectural Route 903 overlap
Baekcheon Bridge	백천교	Prefectural Route 903 (Jeungsan 2-ro)	Gimcheon City	Jeungsan-myeon	Prefectural Route 903 overlap
Eunjeok 1 Bridge	은적1교		Gimcheon City	Jeungsan-myeon	
Eunjeok 1 Bridge			Seongju County	Geumsu-myeon	
Eunjeok 2 Bridge	은적2교		Seongju County	Geumsu-myeon	
Jungri IS	중리삼거리	Prefectural Route 903 (Joma-ro)	Seongju County	Geumsu-myeon	
Gacheon Elementary School - Muhak Branch School	가천초등학교 무학분교		Seongju County	Geumsu-myeon	
Sinseong IS	신성삼거리	National Route 59 (Gacheon-ro)	Seongju County	Geumsu-myeon	National Route 59 overlap
Hupyeong IS	후평삼거리	National Route 59 (Geumgam-ro)	Seongju County	Geumsu-myeon	National Route 59 overlap
Geumsu-myeon Office	금수면사무소		Seongju County	Geumsu-myeon	
Gwangsan IS	광산삼거리	Daegeum-ro	Seongju County	Geumsu-myeon	
Goreumjae	고름재		Seongju County	Geumsu-myeon	
Goreumjae			Seongju County	Byeokjin-myeon	
Icheon Bridge IS	이천교삼거리	Prefectural Route 913 (Dongganghangang-ro)	Seongju County	Byeokjin-myeon	Prefectural Route 913 overlap
Suchon IS	수촌삼거리	Prefectural Route 913 (Byeokbong-ro)	Seongju County	Byeokjin-myeon	Prefectural Route 913 overlap
No name	(이름 없음)	Mundeok-ro	Seongju County	Byeokjin-myeon	
Baekjeon IS	백전사거리	Seongju-ro; Seongjusunhwan-ro	Seongju County	Seongju-eup	
Gyeongsan Bridge IS	경산교삼거리	Simsan-ro	Seongju County	Seongju-eup	
Gyeongsan Bridge	경산교		Seongju County	Seongju-eup	
Daehwang IS	대황삼거리	National Route 33 (Simsan-ro)	Seongju County	Seongju-eup	National Route 33 overlap
Gyeongsan IS	경산 교차로	Prefectural Route 905 (Sangseong-ro)	Seongju County	Seongju-eup	National Route 33 overlap
Seongju IS	성주 교차로	National Route 33 (Gaya-ro); Seongju-ro; Seongsan 9-gil	Seongju County	Seongju-eup	National Route 33 overlap
Sinbu IS	신부 교차로	Seonwol-ro	Seongju County	Seonnam-myeon	
Gwangyeong IS	광영 교차로	Prefectural Route 67; Prefectural Route 79 (Unnyong-ro)	Seongju County	Seonnam-myeon	Prefectural Route 67, 79 overlap Continuation into Daegu
Gwangyeong IS	광영검문소	Seonno-ro	Seongju County	Seonnam-myeon	Prefectural Route 67, 79 overlap Continuation into Daegu
Seongju Bridge	성주대교		Seongju County	Seonnam-myeon	Prefectural Route 67, 79 overlap Continuation into Daegu

=== Daegu ===
Name	Hangul name	Connection	Location		Note
Seongju Bridge	성주대교		Dalseong County	Habin-myeon	Prefectural Route 67, 79 overlap North Gyeongsang Province - Daegu border line
Donggok IS	동곡 교차로	Prefectural Route 67; Prefectural Route 79 (Gangbyeon-daero)	Dalseong County	Habin-myeon	Prefectural Route 67, 79 overlap North Gyeongsang Province - Daegu border line
Donggok IS	동곡네거리	Habinnam-ro; Dalgubeol-daero 55-gil	Dalseong County	Habin-myeon	
No name	(이름 없음)	Munyangyeok-gil	Dalseong County	Dasa-eup	
Dasa-eup Office IS	다사읍사무소 교차로		Dalseong County	Dasa-eup	
Maegok IS	매곡사거리	Dasayeong-ro	Dalseong County	Dasa-eup	
Dasa High School	다사고등학교		Dalseong County	Dasa-eup	
No name	(이름 없음)	Wangseon-ro	Dalseong County	Dasa-eup	
Daesil Station (Daegu Subway)	대실역	Daesiryeokbung-ro; Daesiryeongnam-ro	Dalseong County	Dasa-eup	
Gangchang Bridge	강창교		Dalseong County	Dasa-eup	
Gangchang Bridge			Daegu	Dalseo District	
Gangchang Station (Daegu Subway)	강창역	Hosan-ro; Dalgubeol-daero 203-gil	Daegu	Dalseo District	
Keimyung University (Seongseo Campus)	계명대학교 성서캠퍼스		Daegu	Dalseo District	
Keimyung University Station (Sindang IS)	계명대역 (신당네거리)	Dalseo-daero	Daegu	Dalseo District	
Seongseo Industrial Complex Station (Seongseo IS)	성서산업단지역 (성서네거리)	Seongseo-ro	Daegu	Dalseo District	
Igok 1-dong Community Center Daegu Seongseo Elementary School	이곡1동주민센터 대구성서초등학교		Daegu	Dalseo District	
Igok Station (Daegu Subway)	이곡역	Seongseodong-ro	Daegu	Dalseo District	
Seongseo IC	성서 나들목	Sincheon-daero	Daegu	Dalseo District	
Yongsan Station (Daegu Subway)	용산역		Daegu	Dalseo District	
Yongsan IS	용산네거리	Yongsan-ro	Daegu	Dalseo District	
Jukjeon Station (Jukjeon IS)	죽전역 (죽전네거리)	Waryong-ro	Daegu	Dalseo District	
Gamsam Station (Gamsam IS)	감삼역 (감삼네거리)	Dangsan-ro	Daegu	Dalseo District	
Gamsam Station (Gamsam IS)		Dangsan-ro	Daegu	Seo District	
Dalseong High School	달성고등학교		Daegu	Seo District	
Duryu IS	두류네거리	National Route 5 (Seodaegu-ro); National Route 26; Prefectural Route 30 (Duryugongwon-ro); Dalgubeol-daero	Daegu	Seo District	Terminus
