= House on Wheels =

South Korean variety show

- Promotional poster for season 4
- Hangul: 바퀴 달린 집
- RR: Bakwi dallin jip
- MR: Pak'wi tallin chip
- Genre: Variety; Reality; Travel
- Starring: Sung Dong-il; Kim Hee-won; Yeo Jin-goo; Im Si-wan; Gong Myung; Rowoon
- Country of origin: South Korea
- Original language: Korean
- No. of seasons: 4
- No. of episodes: 35

Production
- Running time: 90 minutes
- Production companies: CJ E&M

Original release
- Network: tvN
- Release: June 11, 2020 – December 8, 2022

House on Wheels (Korean: 바퀴 달린 집; RR: Bakwi dallin jip) is a South Korean variety show featuring Sung Dong-il, Kim Hee-won with Yeo Jin-goo in the first season, Im Si-wan in the second season, Gong Myung in the third season and Rowoon in the fourth season.

The first season premiered on tvN on June 11, 2020 and aired every Thursday at 21:00 (KST). The second season aired every Friday at 21:10 (KST) starting from April 9, 2022. The third season premiered in October 2021 and aired every Thursday at 20:40 (KST). The fourth season premiered on October 13, 2022 and aired every Thursday at 20:40 (KST).

== Synopsis ==
Three actors travel across South Korea in a wheeled house and invite guests to stay with them for a night or two.

== Cast ==
- Sung Dong-il
- Kim Hee-won
- Yeo Jin-goo (Season 1)
- Im Si-wan (Season 2)
- Gong Myung (Season 3)
- Rowoon (Season 4)

== Episodes ==
=== Series overview ===
Season	Episodes	Originally released		Ave. South Korea viewers (millions)
Season	Episodes	First released	Last released	Ave. South Korea viewers (millions)
1	12	June 11, 2020	August 27, 2020	0.994
2	11	April 9, 2021	June 18, 2021	0.982
Spin-off	3	September 13, 2021	September 27, 2021	0.537
3	12	October 14, 2021	January 6, 2022	0.996
4	9	October 13, 2022	December 8, 2022	TBA

=== Season 1 (2020) ===
Ep.	Original broadcast date	Front yard's location	Guest(s)	Ref.
1	June 11, 2020	Sampo Beach (Goseong County, Gangwon)	Ra Mi-ran; Lee Hye-ri	
2	June 18, 2020	Sampo Beach (Goseong County, Gangwon)	Ra Mi-ran; Lee Hye-ri	
3	June 25, 2020	Hamo Breakwater and Meochewat Forest (Jeju Island)	Gong Hyo-jin	
4	July 2, 2020	Hamo Breakwater and Meochewat Forest (Jeju Island)	Gong Hyo-jin	
5	July 9, 2020	Hamo Breakwater and Meochewat Forest (Jeju Island)	Gong Hyo-jin	
5	July 9, 2020	Manseongri Bamboo Forest (Damyang County); Mandol Mudflat (Gochang County)	Lee Sung-kyung; Lee Jun-hyeok	
6	July 16, 2020	Manseongri Bamboo Forest (Damyang County); Mandol Mudflat (Gochang County)	Lee Sung-kyung; Lee Jun-hyeok	
7	July 23, 2020	Goyori Landing Field and Seonyudong Valley Stream (Mungyeong)	IU; P.O (Block B)	
8	July 30, 2020	Goyori Landing Field and Seonyudong Valley Stream (Mungyeong)	IU; P.O (Block B)	
9	August 6, 2020	Cheolma Mountain Camping Site (Gyeonggi Province)	Uhm Tae-goo; Lee Jung-eun; Ko Chang-seok; Park Hyuk-kwon	
10	August 13, 2020	Chuncheon Lake (Gangwon Province)	Jung Eun-ji (Apink)	
11	August 20, 2020	Hakdong Mongdol Beach (Geojedo)	Ha Ji-won	
12	August 27, 2020	Hakdong Mongdol Beach (Geojedo)	Ha Ji-won	

=== Season 2 (2021) ===
Ep.	Original broadcast date	Front yard's location	Guest(s)	Ref.
1	April 9, 2021	Fir forest in Gyebangsan (Pyeongchang County)	Bae Doona	
2	April 16, 2021	Fir forest in Gyebangsan (Pyeongchang County)	Bae Doona	
2	April 16, 2021	Fir forest in Gyebangsan (Pyeongchang County)	Kim Dong-wook	
3	April 23, 2021	Ocean Hill of Chilpo and Wolpo Ocean Viewpoint (Pohang)	Gong Hyo-jin; Oh Jung-se	
4	April 30, 2021	Ocean Hill of Chilpo and Wolpo Ocean Viewpoint (Pohang)	Gong Hyo-jin; Oh Jung-se	
5	May 7, 2021	Yangdong Folk Village's back hill (Gyeongju)	Oh Na-ra	
6	May 14, 2021	Yangdong Folk Village's back hill (Gyeongju)	Oh Na-ra	
6	May 14, 2021	Silver grass field in Taehwasan (Gyeonggi Province)	Jeon Hye-jin	
7	May 21, 2021	Mount Cheonma Pine Tree Forest in Namyangju (Gyeonggi Province)	Kim Yoo-jung	
8	May 28, 2021	Camping site on top of Jirisan (Southern region of South Korea)	Im Yoon-ah; Kim Byung-chul	
9	June 4, 2021	Hadong County millenary green tea field (South Gyeongsang Province)	Im Yoon-ah; Kim Byung-chul	
10	June 11, 2021	Seonheul-ri's virgin forest (Jeju Island)	Yeo Jin-goo	
11	June 18, 2021		Yeo Jin-goo	

=== Season 3 (2021–2022) ===
Ep.	Original broadcast date	Front yard's location	Guest(s)	Ref.
1	October 14, 2021	Wollyu-bong (Yeongdong County)	Lee Hanee	
2	October 21, 2021	Wollyu-bong (Yeongdong County)	Lee Hanee	
3	October 28, 2021	Cheongju (North Chungcheong Province)	Kim Young-ok	
4	November 4, 2021	Cheongju (North Chungcheong Province)	Kim Young-ok; Kim Kwang Gyu; Shin Seung-hwan	
5	November 18, 2021	Donghae Mureung Quarry (Gangwon Province)	Oh Na-ra; Ryu Seung-ryong	
6	November 25, 2021	Joowol Mountain in Boseong County (South Jeolla Province)	Chun Woo-hee; Jo Hyun-chul	
7	December 2, 2021	Southern sea in Boseong County (South Jeolla Province)	Chun Woo-hee; Jo Hyun-chul	
8	December 9, 2021	Ginkgo Forest in Hongcheon County (Gangwon Province)	Rain; Uee	
9	December 16, 2021	Ginkgo Forest in Hongcheon County (Gangwon Province)	Uee	
10	December 23, 2021	Dongmakgol Camping Site in Hongcheon (Gangwon Province)	Kim Sung-kyun; Choi Moo-sung; Shin Won-ho	
11	December 30, 2021	Jangdok Pine Forest in Yeongju (North Gyeongsang Province)	Jung Hae-in	
12	January 6, 2022	Jangdok Pine Forest in Yeongju (North Gyeongsang Province)	Ji Chang-wook	

=== Season 4 (2022) ===
Ep.	Original broadcast date	Front yard's location	Guest(s)	Ref.
1	October 13, 2022	Obongsan Beach in Wonsan-do (Boryeong)	Kim Ah-joong	
2	October 20, 2022	Obongsan Beach in Wonsan-do (Boryeong)	Kim Ah-joong	
3	October 27, 2022	Jeju Island	Kim Ha-neul	
4	November 3, 2022	Jeju Island	Kim Ha-neul	
5	November 10, 2022	Gasong-ri Pungnyu Village (Nakdong River)	Kim Min-ha	
6	November 17, 2022	Gasong-ri Pungnyu Village (Nakdong River)	Kim Min-ha	
7	November 24, 2022	Okcheon Whale Village Maple Forest (Okcheon County)	Kim Hye-yoon, Lee Jae-wook	
8	December 1, 2022	Okcheon Whale Village Maple Forest (Okcheon County)	Kim Hye-yoon, Lee Jae-wook	
9	December 8, 2022	-	All guest season 1-4 (Flashback Episode)	

== Viewership ==
House on Wheels : South Korea viewers per episode (thousands)

Season	Episode number												Average
Season	1	2	3	4	5	6	7	8	9	10	11	12	Average
1	966	814	1124	783	787	795	1235	1098	1119	1021	1057	1129	994
2	980	1097	1129	1007	963	1041	968	985	837	948	844	–	982
Spin-off	669	560	381	–									537
3	1170	1117	1123	985	1118	1093	1061	1079	1008	1161	1100	942	996

Source: Audience measurement performed nationwide by Nielsen Korea.

Average TV viewership ratings (season 1)
Ep.	Original broadcast date	Average audience share	
Ep.	Original broadcast date	Nielsen Korea	
Ep.	Original broadcast date	Nationwide	Seoul
1	June 11, 2020	3.968%	4.944%
2	June 18, 2020	3.328%	3.625%
3	June 25, 2020	4.960%	5.987%
4	July 2, 2020	3.419%	3.996%
5	July 9, 2020	3.401%	4.178%
6	July 16, 2020	3.040%	3.715%
7	July 23, 2020	5.059%	6.424%
8	July 30, 2020	4.307%	5.094%
9	August 6, 2020	4.631%	5.817%
10	August 13, 2020	3.949%	4.786%
11	August 20, 2020	4.333%	5.865%
12	August 27, 2020	4.434%	5.373%
In this table below, the blue numbers represent the lowest ratings and the red numbers represent the highest ratings.

Average TV viewership ratings (season 2)
Ep.	Original broadcast date	Average audience share	
Ep.	Original broadcast date	Nielsen Korea	
Ep.	Original broadcast date	Nationwide	Seoul
1	April 9, 2021	3.955%	4.359%
2	April 16, 2021	3.963%	4.132%
3	April 23, 2021	4.545%	4.774%
4	April 30, 2021	4.063%	4.107%
5	May 7, 2021	3.792%	4.138%
6	May 14, 2021	4.168%	5.211%
7	May 21, 2021	4.235%	4.544%
8	May 28, 2021	4.202%	4.542%
9	June 4, 2021	3.604%	4.187%
10	June 11, 2021	3.733%	3.900%
11	June 18, 2021	3.369%	3.594%
In this table below, the blue numbers represent the lowest ratings and the red numbers represent the highest ratings.

Average TV viewership ratings (spin-off)
Ep.	Original broadcast date	Average audience share	
Ep.	Original broadcast date	Nielsen Korea	
Ep.	Original broadcast date	Nationwide	Seoul
1	September 13, 2021	2.670%	2.912%
2	September 20, 2021	2.100%	2.129%
3	September 27, 2021	1.811%	1.832%
In this table below, the blue numbers represent the lowest ratings and the red numbers represent the highest ratings.

Average TV viewership ratings (season 3)
Ep.	Original broadcast date	Average audience share	
Ep.	Original broadcast date	Nielsen Korea	
Ep.	Original broadcast date	Nationwide	Seoul
1	October 14, 2021	5.127%	5.907%
2	October 21, 2021	4.660%	5.318%
3	October 28, 2021	4.793%	5.285%
4	November 4, 2021	4.452%	5.073%
5	November 18, 2021	4.726%	5.100%
6	November 25, 2021	4.897%	5.152%
7	December 2, 2021	4.303%	4.766%
8	December 9, 2021	5.022%	5.599%
9	December 16, 2021	4.226%	4.708%
10	December 23, 2021	4.892%	5.571%
11	December 30, 2021	4.455%	4.686%
12	January 6, 2022	3.617%	3.603%
In this table below, the blue numbers represent the lowest ratings and the red numbers represent the highest ratings.
