= National Route 19 (South Korea) =

Road in South Korea

National Route 19
- 국도 제19호선

Route information
- Length: 496.4 km (308.4 mi)
- Existed: 31 August 1971–present

Major junctions
- South end: Namhae County, South Gyeongsang Province
- North end: Hongcheon County, Gangwon Province

Location
- Country: South Korea

Highway system
- Highway systems of South Korea; Expressways; National; Local

National Route 19 is a national highway in South Korea connects Namhae County to Hongcheon County. It established on 31 August 1971.

== History ==
- August 31, 1971: Became National Route 19 Namhae ~ Wonju Line by the General National Highway Route Designation Decree.
- October 1, 1975: Total 1.3 km section from Unam-ri, Miwon-myeon, Cheongwon-gun ~ Sanggung-ri, Naebuk-myeon, Boeun-gun opened and existing 1.59 km section abolished
- February 22, 1980: Yeongdeok-ri (Hayeong), Sancheok-myeon, Jungwon-gun, Chungcheongbuk-do ~ Wonju-si, Gangwon-do 39.5 km section opened and existing 39.651 km section abolished
- August 22, 1980: Mokdong-ri, Sandong-myeon, Namwon-gun ~ Eumnae-ri, Muju-eup, Muju-gun 84.6 km section opened
- October 2, 1980: Total 1.331 km section from Mijo-ri, Samdong-myeon ~ Sinjeon-ri, Idong-myeon, Namhae-gun opened and existing 380m section abolished
- May 26, 1987: Existing designated Cheongsan-myeon area (Gopyeong-ri ~ Jijeon-ri, Cheongsan-myeon, Okcheon-gun), Boeun-eup area (Jukjeon-ri ~ Samsan-ri, Boeun-eup, Boeun-gun), Goesan-eup area (Dongbu-ri ~ Daedeok-ri, Goesan-eup, Goesan-gun) sections abolished
- March 23, 1988: Gyesan-ri, Yeongdong-eup, Yeongdong-gun 1.57 km section opened, existing 1.5 km section abolished
- November 16, 1992: Sanggung-ri, Naebuk-myeon, Boeun-gun 180m section opened, existing 392m section abolished
- July 1, 1996: Starting point extended from 'Samdong-myeon, Namhae-gun, Gyeongsangnam-do' to 'Mijo-myeon, Namhae-gun, Gyeongsangnam-do'.
- July 19, 1996: Wonju-si, Gangwon-do ~ Seoseok-myeon, Hongcheon-gun section designated as National Subsidized Provincial Road No. 19 Wonju ~ Hongcheon Line
- April 3, 1998: Janggye-ri, Janggye-eup, Jangsu-gun 860m section opened
- April 28, 1998: Seonbyeon-ri, Hwangjeon-myeon, Suncheon-si, Jeollanam-do ~ Gojuk-dong, Namwon-si, Jeollabuk-do 36.26 km section opened
- November 5, 1998: Oseong-ri ~ Gwangjeon-ri, Gammul-myeon, Goesan-gun 600m section opened, existing 620m section abolished
- December 26, 1998: A-am-ri ~ Beomhwa-ri, Haksan-myeon, Yeongdong-gun 2.07 km section opened, existing 1.3 km section abolished
- March 10, 1999: Idong Bypass Road (Murim-ri ~ Seokpyeong-ri, Idong-myeon, Namhae-gun) 1.4 km section opened, existing 1.2 km section abolished
- April 28, 1999: Seokpyeong-ri ~ Dajeong-ri, Idong-myeon, Namhae-gun 980m section opened
- June 1, 1999: Neungwol-ri, Cheongseong-myeon, Okcheon-gun ~ Seowon-ri, Samseung-myeon, Boeun-gun 1.38 km section expansion opening, existing 1.3 km section abolished
- December 28, 1999: Noryang-ri ~ Songmun-ri, Geumnam-myeon, Hadong-gun 3.2 km section opened, existing 3.5 km section abolished
- January 10, 2000: Sangyong-ri ~ Yul-ri, Yongsan-myeon, Yeongdong-gun 3.6 km section expansion opening
- September 6, 2000: Sinwol ~ Hadong Road (Sinwol-ri, Gojeon-myeon ~ Bipa-ri, Hadong-eup, Hadong-gun) 5.81 km section partial opening
- August 25, 2001: Due to comprehensive revision of the General National Highway Route Designation Decree and National Subsidized Provincial Road Route Designation Decree, National Route 19 and National Subsidized Provincial Road No. 19 were merged and the route was extended. (Before merger: Namhae ~ Wonju Line, Wonju ~ Hongcheon Line) (After merger: Namhae ~ Hongcheon Line)
- December 24, 2001: Sangye-ri ~ Hwaseong-ri, Cheongseong-myeon, Okcheon-gun 2.24 km section expansion opening, existing 2.4 km section abolished
- December 26, 2001: Beophwa-ri, Yongsan-myeon ~ Hyomok-ri, Cheongsan-myeon, Yeongdong-gun 3.02 km section expansion opening, existing 3.3 km section abolished
- December 27, 2001: Sinwol ~ Hadong Road (Sinwol-ri, Gojeon-myeon ~ Gwangpyeong-ri, Hadong-eup, Hadong-gun) 7.74 km entire section expansion opening
- August 3, 2002: Gwanseol-dong ~ Bongsan-dong, Wonju-si 7.4 km section designated as an automobile-only road
- December 12, 2003: Yul-ri, Yongsan-myeon, Yeongdong-gun 880m section expansion opening
- January 16, 2004: Oseong-ri, Gammul-myeon, Goesan-gun 1.08 km section expansion opening
- July 13, 2005: Yongdu-dong ~ Saam-ri, Geumga-myeon, Chungju-si 10.8 km section designated as an automobile-only road
- December 16, 2005: Gaok-ri ~ Osan-ri, Muju-eup, Muju-gun section 8.14 km 4-lane expansion opening.
- January 25, 2006: Beomhwa-ri, Haksan-myeon ~ Buyong-ri, Yeongdong-eup, Yeongdong-gun 11.94 km section expansion opening, existing 12.5 km section abolished
- February 3, 2006: Yeongyeongpo-ri ~ Okdong-ri, Hoengseong-eup, Hoengseong-gun 3.5 km section relocated to Hoengseong County Road No. 2
- November 2, 2006: Guryong-ri, Sotae-myeon, Chungju-si, Chungcheongbuk-do ~ Maeji-ri, Heung-eop-myeon, Wonju-si, Gangwon-do 14.4 km section designated as an automobile-only road
- May 7, 2007: Guryong-ri, Sotae-myeon, Chungju-si 750m section opened, existing section abolished
- [June 29, 2007: Gwirae Bypass Road (Guryong-ri, Sotae-myeon, Chungju-si ~ Ungye-ri, Gwirae-myeon, Wonju-si section 7.5 km) opened.
- July 31, 2007: Gwirae Bypass Road officially opened
- August 12, 2007: Songjuk-ri, Samseung-myeon, Boeun-gun 700m section opened, existing section abolished
- September 18, 2007: Jeondo IC ~ Sinwol Road (Gyecheon-ri, Geumnam-myeon ~ Sinwol-ri, Gojeon-myeon, Hadong-gun) 3.948 km section expansion opening, existing section abolished
- December 31, 2007: Haksan ~ Yeongdong Road (Buyong-ri, Yeongdong-eup, Yeongdong-gun ~ Osan-ri, Muju-eup, Muju-gun) section 20.26 km 4-lane expansion opening., Muju ~ Haksan Road (Osan-ri, Muju-eup, Muju-gun) 2.04 km section expansion opening and existing section abolished
- December 30, 2008: Sasan-ri, Jeoksang-myeon ~ Gaok-ri, Muju-eup, Muju-gun 7.7 km section expansion opening and existing 8.1 km section abolished
- July 18, 2009: Boeun ~ Naebuk Road (Geumgul-ri ~ Haknip-ri, Boeun-eup, Boeun-gun) section 10.7 km 4-lane newly opened.
- December 31, 2009: Suanbo Interchange ~ Suanbo Road (Banggok-ri, Jangyeon-myeon ~ Seseong-ri, Salmi-myeon, Goesan-gun) section 6.6 km newly opened.
- [November 19, 2010: Ungye-ri, Gwirae-myeon ~ Maeji-ri, Heung-eop-myeon, Wonju-si section 8.1 km 4-lane expansion opening.
- November 26, 2010: Automobile-only road section from Guryong-ri, Sotae-myeon, Chungju-si, Chungcheongbuk-do ~ Maeji-ri, Heung-eop-myeon, Wonju-si, Gangwon-do 14.4 km reduced by 220m at Maeji Intersection to become 14.2 km.
- December 22, 2010: Boeun ~ Naebuk Road (Geumgul-ri, Boeun-eup, Boeun-gun ~ Unam-ri, Miwon-myeon, Cheongwon-gun) section 19.9 km 4-lane newly opened.
- December 30, 2010: Muju Anseong Bypass Road (Jukcheon-ri, Anseong-myeon ~ Sasan-ri, Jeoksang-myeon, Muju-gun) 6.8 km section expansion opening, existing 6.0 km section abolished
- March 15, 2011: Naebuk ~ Unam Road (Isik-ri, Sanoe-myeon, Boeun-gun ~ Unam-ri, Miwon-myeon, Cheongwon-gun) 3.5 km section expansion opening
- June 30, 2012: Yeongdeok-ri, Sancheok-myeon ~ Guryong-ri, Sotae-myeon, Chungju-si 9.97 km section expansion opening, existing 11.85 km section abolished
- July 26, 2012: Beonam ~ Jangsu Road (Gukpo-ri, Beonam-myeon ~ Gaejeong-ri, Jangsu-eup, Jangsu-gun) 8.74 km section expansion opening
- June 28, 2013: Chungju National Highway Alternative Bypass Road (Yongdu-dong ~ Saam-ri, Geumga-myeon, Chungju-si section 10.8 km) opened.
- August 12, 2013: Yongdu ~ Geumga Road (Yongdu-dong ~ Daejeon-ri, Dongryang-myeon, Chungju-si) 10.8 km section expansion opening, existing Pungdong ~ Saam-ri, Geumga-myeon, Chungju-si 14.4 km section abolished
- December 23, 2013: Gwanseol ~ Bongsan Road among Wonju-si National Highway Alternative Bypass Roads (Gwanseol Intersection, Gwanseol-dong ~ Haenggu Intersection, Haenggu-dong, Wonju-si) 5.3 km section expansion opening
- January 16, 2014: Due to Wonju-si National Highway Alternative Bypass Road opening, existing Wonju-si arterial route (Heung-eop-ri, Heung-eop-myeon ~ Jangyang-ri, Socho-myeon, Wonju-si) 14.138 km section abolished
- February 19, 2016: Hadong ~ Pyeongsari Road (Eumnae-ri, Hadong-eup ~ Mijeom-ri, Agyang-myeon, Hadong-gun) 8.61 km section expansion opening
- December 20, 2016: Yeongdong ~ Yongsan Road (Buyong-ri ~ Seolgye-ri, Yeongdong-eup, Yeongdong-gun) 2.56 km section expansion opening, existing 2.0 km section abolished
- February 27, 2017: Gohyeon ~ Hadong IC Road Section 3 (Doma-ri, Gohyeon-myeon ~ Deoksin-ri, Seolcheon-myeon, Namhae-gun) 5.0 km section expansion opening, existing Daesa-ri ~ Chamyeon-ri, Gohyeon-myeon, Namhae-gun 800m section abolished
- March 15, 2017: Yeongdong ~ Chupungnyeong Road Section 1 (Buyong-ri, Yeongdong-eup, Yeongdong-gun) 850m section expansion opening, existing section abolished
- May 30, 2017: Gohyeon ~ Hadong IC Road Section 1 (Songmun-ri ~ Gyecheon-ri, Geumnam-myeon, Hadong-gun) 5.71 km section expansion opening, existing 2.2 km section abolished
- May 4, 2018: Unam ~ Miwon Road (Unam-ri ~ Miwon-ri, Miwon-myeon, Sangdang-gu, Cheongju-si) 4.09 km section expansion opening, existing 2.0 km section abolished
- August 10, 2018: Geumgul-ri ~ Ujin-ri, Samseung-myeon, Boeun-gun and Seowon-ri ~ Wonnam-ri, Samseung-myeon, Boeun-gun total 4.0 km section expansion opening, existing Seowon-ri, Samseung-myeon, Boeun-gun 340m section abolished
- August 16, 2018: Goesan ~ Goesan IC Road (Oseong-ri, Gammul-myeon ~ Banggok-ri, Jangyeon-myeon, Goesan-gun) 6.05 km section expansion opening, existing Baegyang-ri, Gammul-myeon ~ Banggok-ri, Jangyeon-myeon, Goesan-gun 4.6 km section abolished
- September 13, 2018: Gohyeon ~ Hadong IC Road Section 2 (Deoksin-ri, Seolcheon-myeon, Namhae-gun ~ Noryang-ri, Geumnam-myeon, Hadong-gun) and Noryang Bridge 3.1 km section expansion opening and existing 3.72 km section abolished
- July 30, 2019: Gohyeon ~ Idong Road (Doma-ri, Gohyeon-myeon ~ Chasan-ri, Namhae-eup, Namhae-gun) 4.3 km section expansion opening, existing Doma-ri, Gohyeon-myeon, Namhae-gun 1.26 km section abolished
- December 27, 2019: Gohyeon ~ Idong Road (Nambyeon-ri, Namhae-eup ~ Seokpyeong-ri, Idong-myeon, Namhae-gun) 5.9 km section expansion opening
- December 21, 2020: Yanga (Dubo) District dangerous road (Yanga-ri, Sangju-myeon, Namhae-gun) 560m section improvement opening, existing 380m section abolished
- June 4, 2021: Hadong ~ Hwagae Road (Mijeom-ri, Agyang-myeon ~ Tap-ri, Hwagae-myeon, Hadong-gun) 9.3 km section expansion opening
- June 22, 2021: 'Dongjin Intersection ~ Geomseung Intersection ~ Oseong-ri, Gammul-myeon, Dongbu-ri, Goesan-eup, Goesan-gun, Chungcheongbuk-do' section changed to 'Dongjin Intersection ~ Dongbu Intersection ~ Neungchon-ri ~ Oseong-ri, Gammul-myeon, Dongbu-ri, Goesan-eup, Goesan-gun, Chungcheongbuk-do' section and existing section national highway designation abolished
- March 31, 2022: Hwaeomsa Access Road (Naengcheon-ri ~ Gwangpyeong-ri, Masan-myeon, Gurye-gun) 900m section expansion opening
- April 11, 2022: Traffic restrictions until June 11, 2022 for Gurye Jicheon District flood recovery from Naengcheon Intersection ~ Gwangui Four-way Intersection 3 km section
- July 19, 2022: Due to Hadong ~ Hwagae Road expansion opening, existing Mijeom-ri ~ Tap-ri, Hwagae-myeon, Hadong-gun total 1.2 km section abolished
- November 17, 2023: Seolgye-ri, Yeongdong-eup, Yeongdong-gun 2.4 km section expansion opening, existing 1.9 km section abolished

== Main stopovers ==
South Gyeongsang Province

- Namhae County - Hadong County

South Jeolla Province

- Gurye County

North Jeolla Province

- Namwon - Jangsu County - Muju County

North Chungcheong Province

- Yeongdong County - Okcheon County - Boeun County - Cheongju - Goesan County - Chungju

Gangwon Province

- Wonju - Hoengseong County - Hongcheon County

== Major intersections ==
- (■): Motorway

IS: Intersection, IC: Interchange

=== South Gyeongsang Province ===
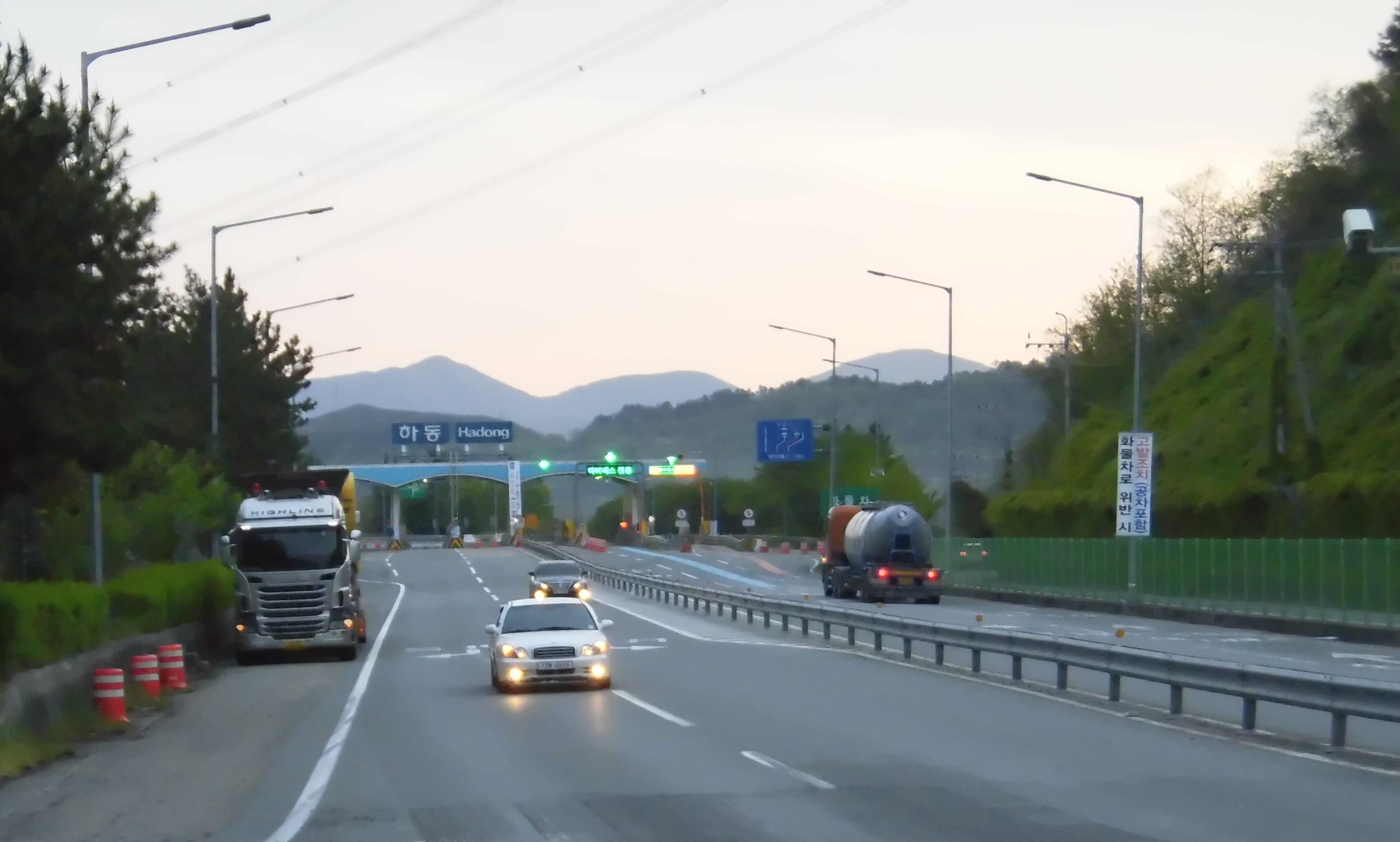
Hadong IC

Name	Hangul name	Connection	Location		Note
Mijoma-eul	미조마을	Mijo-ro	Namhae County	Mijo-myeon	Terminus
Chojeon IS	초전삼거리	National Route 3 National Route 77 (Dongbu-daero)	Namhae County	Mijo-myeon	National Route 77 overlap
Songjeong Beach	송정해수욕장		Namhae County	Mijo-myeon	National Route 77 overlap
Sangju Junior High School Sangju Beach Sangju-myeon Office SangjuElementary School	상주중학교 상주해수욕장 상주면사무소 상주초등학교		Namhae County	Sangju-myeon	National Route 77 overlap
Sangjuhyeon	상주현		Namhae County	Sangju-myeon	National Route 77 overlap
No name	(이름 없음)	Boriam-ro	Namhae County	Idong-myeon	National Route 77 overlap
Sinjeon IS	신전삼거리	Prefectural Route 1024 (Namseo-daero)	Namhae County	Idong-myeon	National Route 77 overlap Prefectural Route 1024 overlap
Idong IS	이동 교차로	Prefectural Route 1024 (Sami-ro); Murim-ro	Namhae County	Idong-myeon	National Route 77 overlap Prefectural Route 1024 overlap
No name	(이름 없음)	Murim-ro	Namhae County	Idong-myeon	National Route 77 overlap
Namhae weather station Garlic Land of Treasure Island Namhae Agricultural Technology Center	남해기상관측소 보물섬 마늘나라 남해군 농업기술센터		Namhae County	Idong-myeon	National Route 77 overlap
Iphyeon Bridge	입현교		Namhae County	Namhae-eup	National Route 77 overlap
Nambyeon IS	남변사거리	Seupocheu-ro; Hwajeon-ro	Namhae County	Namhae-eup	National Route 77 overlap
Gyeongnam Namhae College	경남도립남해대학		Namhae County	Namhae-eup	National Route 77 overlap
Namhae Underpass	남해지하차도		Namhae County	Namhae-eup	National Route 77 overlap
Namhae Jeil High School Namhae Intercity Bus Terminal	남해제일고등학교 남해시외버스터미널		Namhae County	Namhae-eup	National Route 77 overlap
Simcheon IS	심천삼거리	Hwajeon-ro	Namhae County	Namhae-eup	National Route 77 overlap
No name	(이름 없음)	Hwabang-ro	Namhae County	Gohyeon-myeon	National Route 77 overlap
Doma Elementary School	도마초등학교		Namhae County	Gohyeon-myeon	National Route 77 overlap
Seongsan IS	성산삼거리	Prefectural Route 1024 (Seolcheon-ro)	Namhae County	Gohyeon-myeon	National Route 77 overlap Prefectural Route 1024 overlap
No name	(이름 없음)	Jilgae-ro	Namhae County	Gohyeon-myeon	National Route 77 overlap Prefectural Route 1024 overlap
Tapdong IS	탑동 교차로	National Route 77; Prefectural Route 1024 (Namseo-daero)	Namhae County	Gohyeon-myeon	National Route 77 overlap Prefectural Route 1024 overlap
Gohyeon IS	고현 교차로	Tapdong-ro	Namhae County	Gohyeon-myeon	
Deoksin IS	덕신삼거리	Noryang-ro	Namhae County	Seolcheon-myeon	
Noryang IS	노량삼거리	Prefectural Route 1024 (Noryang-ro)	Namhae County	Seolcheon-myeon	
Namhae Bridge	남해대교		Namhae County	Seolcheon-myeon	
Namhae Bridge			Hadong County	Geumnam-myeon	
Namhae Bridge IS	남해대교 교차로	Prefectural Route 1002 (Gunoryang-gil)	Hadong County	Geumnam-myeon	
Noryang IS	노량 교차로	Jemeondang-gil	Hadong County	Geumnam-myeon	
Sinnoryang IS	신노량 교차로	Jemeondang-gil	Hadong County	Geumnam-myeon	
Geumnam IS	금남 교차로	Jemeondang-gil	Hadong County	Geumnam-myeon	
Sosong IS	소송 교차로	Sosongyangdal-gil; Sosongeumdal-gil	Hadong County	Geumnam-myeon	
Geumnam High School Geumnam Middle School	금남고등학교 금남중학교		Hadong County	Geumnam-myeon	
Deokcheon IS	덕천삼거리	Jugyo-ro	Hadong County	Geumnam-myeon	
No name	(이름 없음)	Gyeongjesaneop-ro	Hadong County	Geumnam-myeon	
Hadong IC (Gyecheon IS)	하동 나들목 (계천사거리)	Namhae Expressway; National Route 59 (Saneop-ro)	Hadong County	Geumnam-myeon	National Route 59 overlap
Gonam Bridge	고남교		Hadong County	Geumnam-myeon	National Route 59 overlap
Gonam Bridge			Hadong County	Gojeon-myeon	National Route 59 overlap
Jeondo IS	전도 교차로	Hadongeupseong-ro	Hadong County	Gojeon-myeon	National Route 59 overlap
Woljin IS	월진 교차로	Jaecheop-gil	Hadong County	Gojeon-myeon	National Route 59 overlap
Hadongpogu Tunnel	하동포구터널		Hadong County	Gojeon-myeon	National Route 59 overlap Right tunnel: Approximately 630m Left tunnel: Approximately 670m
Sinbang IS	신방 교차로	Jaecheop-gil	Hadong County	Gojeon-myeon	National Route 59 overlap
No name	(이름 없음)	Gongseolundongjang-ro	Hadong County	Gojeon-myeon	National Route 59 overlap
Hoengcheon Bridge	횡천교		Hadong County	Gojeon-myeon	National Route 59 overlap
Hoengcheon Bridge			Hadong County	Hadong-eup	National Route 59 overlap
Gyeseong Bridge	계성교		Hadong County	Hadong-eup	National Route 59 overlap
No name	(이름 없음)	Guncheong-ro	Hadong County	Hadong-eup	National Route 59 overlap
Seomjin Bridge IS	섬진교사거리	National Route 2 Prefectural Route 58 (Gyeongseo-daero); Seomjingang-daero	Hadong County	Hadong-eup	National Route 2, National Route 59 overlap Prefectural Route 58 overlap
Hadong High School Hadong Elementary School	하동고등학교 하동초등학교		Hadong County	Hadong-eup	National Route 2, National Route 59 overlap Prefectural Route 58 overlap
Hadong Police Station	하동경찰서	Guncheong-ro; Hyanggyo 1-gil	Hadong County	Hadong-eup	National Route 2, National Route 59 overlap Prefectural Route 58 overlap
Hadong Intercity Bus Terminal	하동시외버스터미널	National Route 2 National Route 59; Prefectural Route 58 (Gyeongseo-daero)	Hadong County	Hadong-eup	National Route 2, National Route 59 overlap Prefectural Route 58 overlap
Hadong Post Office Hadong-eup Office Hadong-gun Office	하동우체국 하동읍사무소 하동군청 별관		Hadong County	Hadong-eup	
Eupnae IS	읍내삼거리	Seomjingang-daero	Hadong County	Hadong-eup	
Dugok IS	두곡삼거리	Hwasim-gil	Hadong County	Hadong-eup	
Agyang IS	악양삼거리	Agyangdong-ro	Hadong County	Agyang-myeon	
Pyeongsari Park	평사리공원		Hadong County	Agyang-myeon	
Pyeongsa-ri IS	평사리삼거리	Prefectural Route 1003 (Agyangseo-ro)	Hadong County	Agyang-myeon	
Institute of Hadong Green Tea	하동녹차연구소		Hadong County	Hwagae-myeon	
(Namdo Bridge)	(남도대교 동단)	Namdo Bridge	Hadong County	Hwagae-myeon	
Hwagae Market IS	화개장터삼거리	Ssanggye-ro	Hadong County	Hwagae-myeon	
Hwagae Bridge	화개교		Hadong County	Hwagae-myeon	
Hwagae IS	화개삼거리	Prefectural Route 1023 (Hwagae-ro)	Hadong County	Hwagae-myeon	Continuation into South Jeolla Province

=== South Jeolla Province ===
Name	Hangul name	Connection	Location		Note
Oegok IS	외곡삼거리	Prefectural Route 865 (Piagol-ro)	Gurye County	Toji-myeon	Prefectural Route 865 overlap South Gyeongsang Province - South Jeolla Province border line
Hansu Bridge	한수교		Gurye County	Toji-myeon	Prefectural Route 865 overlap South Gyeongsang Province - South Jeolla Province border line
Guryedong Middle School	구례동중학교		Gurye County	Toji-myeon	Prefectural Route 865 overlap South Gyeongsang Province - South Jeolla Province border line
Dongbangcheon IS	동방천삼거리	Prefectural Route 865 (Ganjeonjungang-ro)	Gurye County	Toji-myeon	Prefectural Route 865 overlap South Gyeongsang Province - South Jeolla Province border line
Toji Elementary School Toji-myeon Office	토지초등학교 토지면사무소		Gurye County	Toji-myeon	
Yongdugalrimgil IS	용두갈림길 교차로	Dangmolsaem-ro	Gurye County	Toji-myeon	
Naengcheon IS	냉천삼거리	National Route 18 (Hwaeomsa-ro)	Gurye County	Masan-myeon	National Route 18 overlap
Naengcheon IC	냉천 나들목	National Route 17; National Route 18 (Saneop-ro) (Gurye-ro)	Gurye County	Masan-myeon	National Route 18 overlap
Eodeokchon IS	어덕촌삼거리	Prefectural Route 861 (KBS junggyeso-ro)	Gurye County	Gwangui-myeon	
Gwangui IS	광의사거리	Prefectural Route 861 (Maecheon-ro)	Gurye County	Gwangui-myeon	
Seosi 2 Bridge	서시2교		Gurye County	Gwangui-myeon	
Seosi 2 Bridge			Gurye County	Yongbang-myeon	
Yongbang IS	용방 교차로	Seonwol-gil	Gurye County	Yongbang-myeon	
Gurye-Hwaeomsa IC	구례화엄사 나들목	Suncheon-Wanju Expressway	Gurye County	Yongbang-myeon	
Ssuakjae	쑤악재		Gurye County	Yongbang-myeon	
Ssuakjae			Gurye County	Sandong-myeon	
Sandong IS	산동 교차로	Yongsan-ro; Jirisanoncheon-ro	Gurye County	Sandong-myeon	
No name	(이름 없음)	Yongsan-ro; Wonchon-gil	Gurye County	Sandong-myeon	
Wonchon IS	원촌 교차로	Yongsan-ro; Surakpokpo-gil; Wonchon-gil	Gurye County	Sandong-myeon	
Bamjae Tunnel	밤재터널		Gurye County	Sandong-myeon	Right tunnel: Approximately 1,490m Left tunnel: Approximately 800m Continuation into North Jeolla Province

=== North Jeolla Province ===
Name	Hangul name	Connection	Location		Note
Bamjae Tunnel	밤재터널		Namwon City	Jucheon-myeon	Right tunnel: Approximately 1,490m Left tunnel: Approximately 800m South Jeolla Province - North Jeolla Province border line
Jangan IS	장안 교차로	Prefectural Route 60 (Ssukgogae-ro); Jungsong-gil	Namwon City	Jucheon-myeon	
Yukmojeong IS	육모정 교차로	Prefectural Route 60 (Jeongnyeongchi-ro); Prefectural Route 730 (Woncheon-ro)	Namwon City	Jucheon-myeon	Connected with Jangan IS
Yongdam Bridge	용담교		Namwon City	Jucheon-myeon	
Chodong Bridge	초동교		Namwon City	Ibaek-myeon	
Cheokdong Bridge	척동교	Ibaek-ro	Namwon City	Ibaek-myeon	
Yocheon Bridge	요천교		Namwon City	Ibaek-myeon	
Yocheon Bridge			Namwon City	Dotong-dong	
Gojuk IS	고죽 교차로	National Route 24 (Yocheon-ro); Saneop-ro	Namwon City	Dotong-dong	National Route 24 overlap
Namwon Fire Station	남원소방서		Namwon City	Dotong-dong	National Route 24 overlap
Galchi IS	갈치삼거리	Prefectural Route 721 (Bosan-ro)	Namwon City	Dotong-dong	National Route 24 overlap
Yocheon IS	요천삼거리	National Route 24 (Hwangsan-ro)	Namwon City	Dotong-dong	National Route 24 overlap
West Korea Forest Service	서부지방산림청		Namwon City	Sandong-myeon	
Taepyeong IS	태평삼거리	Yocheonsang-ro	Namwon City	Sandong-myeon	
Sandong-myeon Office Sandong Elementary School	산동면사무소 산동초등학교		Namwon City	Sandong-myeon	
Singi Bridge	신기교		Namwon City	Sandong-myeon	
Nonsil IS (East Namwon IC)	논실삼거리 (동남원 나들목)	Gwangju–Daegu Expressway; Prefectural Route 743	Jangsu County	Beonam-myeon	Prefectural Route 743 overlap Former South Jangsu IC
Daeron IS	대론삼거리	Seongam-gil	Jangsu County	Beonam-myeon	Prefectural Route 743 overlap
Beonam-myeon Office Beonam Bus stop	번암면사무소 번암정류소		Jangsu County	Beonam-myeon	Prefectural Route 743 overlap
Nodan IS	노단삼거리	Prefectural Route 743; Prefectural Route 751 (Jiji-ro)	Jangsu County	Beonam-myeon	Prefectural Route 843, 751 overlap
Juksan IS	죽산삼거리	Banghwadong-ro	Jangsu County	Beonam-myeon	Prefectural Route 751 overlap
Gukpo IS	국포삼거리	Prefectural Route 751 (Jangnam-ro)	Jangsu County	Beonam-myeon	Prefectural Route 751 overlap
Subunryeong	수분령		Jangsu County	Jangsu-eup	
Subun IS	수분 교차로	Eommokjeong-ro	Jangsu County	Jangsu-eup	
Gaejeong 2 IS	개정2사거리	National Route 13 (Bihaeng-ro); Hannuri-ro	Jangsu County	Jangsu-eup	National Route 13 overlap
Bukdong Overpass	북동육교	Sijang-ro	Jangsu County	Jangsu-eup	National Route 13 overlap
Jangsu Overpass	장수육교	National Route 13 (Jangcheol-ro)	Jangsu County	Jangsu-eup	National Route 13 overlap
Ssarijae Tunnel	싸리재터널		Jangsu County	Jangsu-eup	Approximately 270m
Ssarijae Bridge	싸리재교	Ssarijae-ro	Jangsu County	Jangsu-eup	
No name	(이름 없음)	Goyang-ro	Jangsu County	Gyenam-myeon	
Hwaeum IS	화음삼거리	Jangansan-ro	Jangsu County	Gyenam-myeon	
Gyenam Bus stop Gyenam-myeon Office	계남정류소 계남면사무소		Jangsu County	Gyenam-myeon	
Jangsu IC	장수 나들목	Iksan–Pohang Expressway	Jangsu County	Gyenam-myeon	
(Hoejeon IS)	(회전 교차로)	Jangmu-ro; Janggye 1-gil	Jangsu County	Janggye-myeon	
Janggye-myeon Office	장계면사무소	Munhwa-ro; Handeul-ro	Jangsu County	Janggye-myeon	
Sindong IS (Mujin Fire Station)	신동삼거리 (무진장소방서)	National Route 26 (Yuksimnyeong-ro)	Jangsu County	Janggye-myeon	National Route 26 overlap
Janggye IS	장계사거리	Jangmu-ro	Jangsu County	Janggye-myeon	National Route 26 overlap
Jipjae	집재		Jangsu County	Janggye-myeon	Elevation 510m
Jipjae			Jangsu County	Gyebuk-myeon	Elevation 510m
Sanchon IS	산촌삼거리	Prefectural Route 743 (Wolhyeon-ro)	Jangsu County	Gyebuk-myeon	Prefectural Route 743 overlap
Maegye IS	매계삼거리	Prefectural Route 743 (Nongso-ro)	Jangsu County	Gyebuk-myeon	Prefectural Route 743 overlap
Eojeon IS	어전사거리	Sobijae-ro; Jimajae-ro	Jangsu County	Gyebuk-myeon	
Gyebuk-myeon Office Gyebuk Bus stop Gyebuk Middle School	계북면사무소 계북정류소 계북중학교		Jangsu County	Gyebuk-myeon	
Impyeong IS	임평삼거리	Donggye-ro	Jangsu County	Gyebuk-myeon	
Wonchon IS	원촌삼거리	Prefectural Route 635 (Gyehang-ro)	Jangsu County	Gyebuk-myeon	
Wonchon Bridge	원촌교		Jangsu County	Gyebuk-myeon	
Wonchon Bridge			Muju County	Anseong-myeon	
Jiso IS	지소삼거리	Tookdong-ro	Muju County	Anseong-myeon	
Jukcheon IS	죽천삼거리	Prefectural Route 727 (Deogyusan-ro)	Muju County	Anseong-myeon	
Deogyusan IC (Jukcheon IS)	덕유산 나들목 (죽천 교차로)	Tongyeong–Daejeon Expressway; Anseong-ro	Muju County	Anseong-myeon	
Sangimok Bridge	상이목교		Muju County	Anseong-myeon	
Sangimok IS	상이목 교차로	Wontongsa-ro	Muju County	Anseong-myeon	
Jungsan IS	중산 교차로	Chiryeon-ro	Muju County	Anseong-myeon	
Geumpyeong IS	금평 교차로	Geumpyeong-gil	Muju County	Anseong-myeon	
Sajeon IS	사전 교차로	Prefectural Route 49 (Anseong-ro)	Muju County	Anseong-myeon	Prefectural Route 49 overlap
Anseongjae	안성재		Muju County	Anseong-myeon	Prefectural Route 49 overlap Elevation 500m
Anseongjae			Muju County	Jeoksang-myeon	Prefectural Route 49 overlap Elevation 500m
Sasan IS	사산 교차로	Prefectural Route 49 (Chimajae-ro)	Muju County	Jeoksang-myeon	Prefectural Route 49 overlap
Sanae IS	사내 교차로	Sanae-ro	Muju County	Jeoksang-myeon	
Jeoksang IS	적상 교차로	National Route 30 (Yeoyong-ro)	Muju County	Jeoksang-myeon	National Route 30 overlap
Sacheon IS	사천 교차로	Gurigol-ro	Muju County	Jeoksang-myeon	National Route 30 overlap
Jeoksangsan Tunnel	적상산터널		Muju County	Jeoksang-myeon	National Route 30 overlap Right tunnel: Approximately 433m Left tunnel: Approximately 485m
Gilwang IS	길왕 교차로	Jeoksangsan-ro	Muju County	Jeoksang-myeon	National Route 30 overlap
Jeoksangsan Bridge	적상산교		Muju County	Jeoksang-myeon	National Route 30 overlap
Jeoksangsan Bridge			Muju County	Muju-eup	National Route 30 overlap
Jeoksang Tunnel	적상터널		Muju County	Muju-eup	National Route 30 overlap Approximately 80m
Muju IC (Garim IS)	무주 나들목 (가림 교차로)	Tongyeong–Daejeon Expressway	Muju County	Muju-eup	National Route 30 overlap
Gaok IS	가옥 교차로	National Route 37 (Mugeum-ro)	Muju County	Muju-eup	National Route 30, National Route 37 overlap
Ssarijae Tunnel	싸리재터널		Muju County	Muju-eup	National Route 30, National Route 37 overlap Approximately 385m
Dangsan IS	당산 교차로	Hanpungru-ro	Muju County	Muju-eup	National Route 30, National Route 37 overlap
Muju 1 IS	무주1 교차로	National Route 30; National Route 37; Prefectural Route 727 (Hanpungru-ro) (Goemok-ro)	Muju County	Muju-eup	National Route 30, National Route 37 overlap
Chilri Bridge	칠리대교		Muju County	Muju-eup	National Route 30, National Route 37 overlap
Muju 2 IS	무주2 교차로	National Route 30; National Route 37 (Museol-ro)	Muju County	Muju-eup	National Route 30, National Route 37 overlap
Apchi Tunnel	압치터널		Muju County	Muju-eup	Right tunnel: Approximately 480m Left tunnel: Approximately 500m Continuation into North Chungcheong Province

=== North Chungcheong Province ===
Name	Hangul name	Connection	Location		Note
Apchi Tunnel	압치터널		Yeongdong County	Haksan-myeon	Right tunnel: Approximately 480m Left tunnel: Approximately 500m North Jeolla Province - North Chungcheong Province border line
Bongso IS	봉소 교차로	Muhak-ro	Yeongdong County	Haksan-myeon	
Bongsan IS	봉산 교차로	Prefectural Route 501 (Galgisan-ro); Muhak-ro	Yeongdong County	Haksan-myeon	
Samjeong-ri Entrance	삼정리입구	Samjeong 2-gil	Yeongdong County	Haksan-myeon	
Deokcheon Bridge	덕천교	Muhak-ro	Yeongdong County	Haksan-myeon	
Haksan IS	학산사거리	Seosan-ro; Seosandong-gil	Yeongdong County	Haksan-myeon	
Haksan IS	학산삼거리	Seosan-ro	Yeongdong County	Haksan-myeon	
Mapo IS	마포 교차로	Haksanyeongdong-ro	Yeongdong County	Haksan-myeon	
Mukjeong IS	묵정 교차로	Prefectural Route 68; Prefectural Route 505 (Haksanyeongdong-ro) (Yonghwayanggang-ro)	Yeongdong County	Yanggang-myeon	Prefectural Route 68 overlap
Wondong IS	원동 교차로	Haksanyeongdong-ro	Yeongdong County	Yanggang-myeon	Prefectural Route 68 overlap
Goemok IS	괴목 교차로	Goemoksanmang-ro	Yeongdong County	Yanggang-myeon	Prefectural Route 68 overlap
Gadong IS	가동 교차로	Goemok-ro	Yeongdong County	Yanggang-myeon	Prefectural Route 68 overlap
Yanggadong IS	양가동 교차로	Yangjeongjukchon-ro	Yeongdong County	Yeongdong-eup	Prefectural Route 68 overlap
Yeongdong IS	영동 교차로	National Route 4 (Nangye-ro)	Yeongdong County	Yeongdong-eup	National Route 4 overlap Prefectural Route 68 overlap
Maecheon IS	매천 교차로	Prefectural Route 68 (Yeongdonghwanggan-ro); Buyongdong 1-ro	Yeongdong County	Yeongdong-eup	National Route 4 overlap Prefectural Route 68 overlap
Buyong IS	부용사거리	Jungang-ro; Haksanyeongdong-ro	Yeongdong County	Yeongdong-eup	National Route 4 overlap
Yeongdong Post Office	영동우체국		Yeongdong County	Yeongdong-eup	National Route 4 overlap
Buyong IS	부용 교차로	National Route 4 (Nangye-ro)	Yeongdong County	Yeongdong-eup	National Route 4 overlap
Buyong Bridge Geumsan Bridge	부용교 금산교		Yeongdong County	Yeongdong-eup	
Yeongsan IS	영산 교차로	Geumdong-ro	Yeongdong County	Yeongdong-eup	
Gugyo Bridge	구교교		Yeongdong County	Yeongdong-eup	
Nuneochi IS	눈어치 교차로	Daehak-ro	Yeongdong County	Yeongdong-eup	
Eomisil IS	어미실삼거리	Gigol-ro	Yeongdong County	Yeongdong-eup	
Youngdong University	영동대학교		Yeongdong County	Yeongdong-eup	
Solchijae	솔치재		Yeongdong County	Yeongdong-eup	
Solchijae			Yeongdong County	Yongsan-myeon	
Bonghyeon IS	봉현삼거리	Simwonhoepo-ro	Yeongdong County	Yongsan-myeon	
Songcheon Bridge	송천교		Yeongdong County	Yongsan-myeon	
Yulri IS	율리 교차로	Yongsan-ro; Yulli-gil	Yeongdong County	Yongsan-myeon	
Yeongdong IC (Sangyong IS)	영동 나들목 (상용사거리)	Gyeongbu Expressway; Prefectural Route 514 (Yongsan-ro)	Yeongdong County	Yongsan-myeon	Prefectural Route 514 overlap
Samyong IS	삼용삼거리	Prefectural Route 514 (Yongsim-ro)	Yeongdong County	Yongsan-myeon	Prefectural Route 514 overlap
Maenam IS	매남사거리	Hangokbaekjajeon-ro	Yeongdong County	Yongsan-myeon	
Saemtijae	샘티재		Yeongdong County	Yongsan-myeon	
Saemtijae			Okcheon County	Cheongsan-myeon	
Mokdong IS	목동삼거리	Okcheoncheongsan Industrial Complex	Okcheon County	Cheongsan-myeon	
Injeong IS	인정삼거리	Sinmaeinjeong-ro	Okcheon County	Cheongsan-myeon	
Cheongsan Bridge	청산교		Okcheon County	Cheongsan-myeon	
Cheongsan IS	청산삼거리	Prefectural Route 505 (Cheongsangwangi-ro)	Okcheon County	Cheongsan-myeon	Prefectural Route 505 overlap
Gyopyeong IS	교평삼거리	Jijeon-gil	Okcheon County	Cheongsan-myeon	Prefectural Route 505 overlap
No name	(이름 없음)	Bocheongcheon-gil; Jijeon 1-gil	Okcheon County	Cheongsan-myeon	Prefectural Route 505 overlap
Jijeon IS	지전삼거리	Jijeon-gil	Okcheon County	Cheongsan-myeon	Prefectural Route 505 overlap
Sangye IS	산계삼거리	Prefectural Route 505 (Cheongseong-ro)	Okcheon County	Cheongseong-myeon	Prefectural Route 505 overlap
Dogok Clinic	도곡보건진료소		Okcheon County	Cheongseong-myeon	
Neungwolri IS	능월리삼거리	Wonnam-ro	Okcheon County	Cheongseong-myeon	
Wonnam IS	원남 교차로	Prefectural Route 502 (Samseungtanbu-ro); Wonnamjangam-ro	Boeun County	Samseung-myeon	
Seowonri IS	서원리삼거리	Wonnam-ro	Boeun County	Samseung-myeon	
Sangga IS	상가삼거리	Sanggacheonnam-ro	Boeun County	Samseung-myeon	
Songjuk Elementary School	송죽초등학교		Boeun County	Samseung-myeon	
Songjuk IS	송죽사거리	Geohyeonsongjung-ro; Cheonnamsongjung-ro	Boeun County	Samseung-myeon	
Songjuk Bridge	송죽교		Boeun County	Samseung-myeon	
Songjuk Bridge			Boeun County	Boeun-eup	
Boeun IC	보은 나들목	Dangjin-Yeongdeok Expressway	Boeun County	Boeun-eup	
Geumgul IS	금굴삼거리	Deokdonggoseung-ro	Boeun County	Boeun-eup	
Geumgul IS	금굴 교차로	Nambu-ro	Boeun County	Boeun-eup	
No name	(이름 없음)	Songsan-gil; Wolsongeoam-gil	Boeun County	Boeun-eup	
Boeun IS	보은 교차로	National Route 25; National Route 37 (Bocheong-daero)	Boeun County	Boeun-eup	
Sinham IC Bridge	신함IC교	Sinham 1-gil	Boeun County	Boeun-eup	
Bonggye 1 IS	봉계1 교차로	Nambu-ro	Boeun County	Boeun-eup	
Bonggye IC Bridge	봉계IC교		Boeun County	Boeun-eup	
Bonggye IC Bridge			Boeun County	Naebuk-myeon	
Bonggye 2 IS	봉계2 교차로	Prefectural Route 575 (Sanoe-ro) (Nambu-ro)	Boeun County	Naebuk-myeon	
Bonggye 2 IS		Prefectural Route 575 (Sanoe-ro) (Nambu-ro)	Boeun County	Sanoe-myeon	
Bonggye Tunnel	봉계터널		Boeun County	Sanoe-myeon	Approximately 1668m
Jungti IS	중티 교차로	Naebuksanoe-ro	Boeun County	Sanoe-myeon	
Isik IS	이식 교차로	Naebuksanoe-ro	Boeun County	Sanoe-myeon	
Isik Bridge	이식교		Boeun County	Sanoe-myeon	
Isik Bridge			Boeun County	Naebuk-myeon	
Bonghwang IS	봉황 교차로	Seongamgago-ro	Boeun County	Naebuk-myeon	
Bonghwang Bridge	봉황교		Boeun County	Naebuk-myeon	
Bonghwang Tunnel	봉황터널		Boeun County	Naebuk-myeon	
Bonghwang Tunnel			Cheongju City	Sangdang District Miwon-myeon	
Unam IS	운암 교차로	Prefectural Route 571 (Nambu-ro); Unamgyewon-ro	Cheongju City	Sangdang District Miwon-myeon	
Miwon IS (Miwon Terminal)	미원사거리 (미원터미널)	Prefectural Route 32 (Danjae-ro)	Cheongju City	Sangdang District Miwon-myeon	Prefectural Route 32 overlap
Miwon IS	미원삼거리	Miwonsinae 2-gil	Cheongju City	Sangdang District Miwon-myeon	Prefectural Route 32 overlap
Miwon-myeon Office	미원면사무소	Prefectural Route 511 (Miwonchojeong-ro)	Cheongju City	Sangdang District Miwon-myeon	Prefectural Route 32 overlap
Miwon Elementary School Miwon Middle School Cheongwon Library	미원초등학교 미원중학교 청원도서관		Cheongju City	Sangdang District Miwon-myeon	Prefectural Route 32 overlap
Gubang IS	구방삼거리	Prefectural Route 32 (Goesan-ro)	Cheongju City	Sangdang District Miwon-myeon	Prefectural Route 32 overlap
Buheung IS	부흥사거리	National Route 37 (Geumpyeong-ro); Prefectural Route 592 (Jilma-ro)	Goesan County	Cheongan-myeon	National Route 37 overlap
Jigyeong IS	지경삼거리	Prefectural Route 533 (Dogyeong-ro)	Goesan County	Cheongcheon-myeon	National Route 37 overlap Prefectural Route 533 overlap
Jigyeong 2 IS	지경2삼거리	Prefectural Route 533 (Jangam-ro)	Goesan County	Mungwang-myeon	National Route 37 overlap Prefectural Route 533 overlap
Gultijae	굴티재		Goesan County	Mungwang-myeon	National Route 37 overlap
Mungwang IS	문광삼거리	Prefectural Route 49 (Songmun-ro)	Goesan County	Mungwang-myeon	National Route 37 overlap Prefectural Route 49 overlap
Mungwang Elementary School	문광초등학교		Goesan County	Mungwang-myeon	National Route 37 overlap Prefectural Route 49 overlap
Gwangdeok IS	광덕삼거리	Gwangdeok-gil	Goesan County	Mungwang-myeon	National Route 37 overlap Prefectural Route 49 overlap
Mungwang Bridge	문광교		Goesan County	Mungwang-myeon	National Route 37 overlap Prefectural Route 49 overlap
Mungwang Bridge			Goesan County	Goesan-eup	National Route 37 overlap Prefectural Route 49 overlap
Goesan Middle School	괴산중학교		Goesan County	Goesan-eup	National Route 37 overlap Prefectural Route 49 overlap
Daesa IS	대사삼거리	Eumnae-ro	Goesan County	Goesan-eup	National Route 37 overlap Prefectural Route 49 overlap
Geumsan IS	금산삼거리	Eumnae-ro 2-gil	Goesan County	Goesan-eup	National Route 37 overlap Prefectural Route 49 overlap
Goesan County Hall Goesan Bus Terminal	괴산군민회관 괴산시외버스공용터미널		Goesan County	Goesan-eup	National Route 37 overlap Prefectural Route 49 overlap
Clock Tower IS	시계탑사거리	Eumnae-ro; Eumnae-ro 11-gil	Goesan County	Goesan-eup	National Route 37 overlap Prefectural Route 49 overlap
Goesan Fire Station	괴산119안전센터		Goesan County	Goesan-eup	National Route 37 overlap Prefectural Route 49 overlap
Daedeok IS Dongjin IS	대덕사거리 동진 교차로	National Route 34; National Route 37; Prefectural Route 49 (Jungbu-ro); Jewol-ro	Goesan County	Goesan-eup	National Route 34, National Route 37 overlap Prefectural Route 49 overlap
Geomseung IS	검승 교차로	National Route 34 (Jungbu-ro)	Goesan County	Goesan-eup	National Route 34 overlap
Oreung IS	오릉 교차로	Chungmin-ro	Goesan County	Goesan-eup	
Singi IS	신기삼거리	Gammul-ro	Goesan County	Gammul-myeon	
Gwangjeon IS	광전사거리	Prefectural Route 525 (Maengijae-ro) (Chungmin-ro Sindae-gil)	Goesan County	Gammul-myeon	
Neureupjae	느릅재		Goesan County	Gammul-myeon	Elevation 397m
Neureupjae			Goesan County	Jangyeon-myeon	Elevation 397m
No name	(이름 없음)	Juwol-ro	Goesan County	Jangyeon-myeon	
Goesan IC	괴산 나들목	Jungbu Naeryuk Expressway	Goesan County	Jangyeon-myeon	
Goesan IS	괴산 교차로	Chungmin-ro	Goesan County	Jangyeon-myeon	
Banggok IS	방곡 교차로	Prefectural Route 508 (Chungmin-ro)	Goesan County	Jangyeon-myeon	
Mungang 1 Bridge	문강1교		Goesan County	Jangyeon-myeon	
Mungang 1 Bridge			Chungju City	Salmi-myeon	
Mungang IS	문강 교차로	Prefectural Route 510 (Palbong-ro)	Chungju City	Salmi-myeon	
Salmi Tunnel	살미터널		Chungju City	Salmi-myeon	Right tunnel: Approximately 488m Left tunnel: Approximately 526m
Seseong IS	세성 교차로	National Route 3 National Route 36; Prefectural Route 82 (Jungwon-daero)	Chungju City	Salmi-myeon	National Route 3, National Route 36 overlap Prefectural Route 82 overlap
Salmi IS	살미삼거리	Seseong-ro	Chungju City	Salmi-myeon	National Route 3, National Route 36 overlap Prefectural Route 82 overlap
Munsan IS	문산삼거리	Mungang-ro	Chungju City	Salmi-myeon	National Route 3, National Route 36 overlap Prefectural Route 82 overlap
Hoeumsil IS	호음실삼거리	Hoeumsil 1-gil	Chungju City	Salmi-myeon	National Route 3, National Route 36 overlap Prefectural Route 82 overlap
Hyangsan IS	향산삼거리	Yujumang-ro	Chungju City	Salmi-myeon	National Route 3, National Route 36 overlap Prefectural Route 82 overlap
Norumok Bridge	노루목다리		Chungju City	Salmi-myeon	National Route 3, National Route 36 overlap Prefectural Route 82 overlap
Norumok Bridge			Chungju City	Dalcheon-dong	National Route 3, National Route 36 overlap Prefectural Route 82 overlap
Pungdong IS	풍동 교차로	Prefectural Route 82 (Jungwon-daero)	Chungju City	Dalcheon-dong	National Route 3, National Route 36 overlap Prefectural Route 82 overlap
General Im Gyeong-eop IS	임경업장군 교차로	Sangpung 2-gil	Chungju City	Dalcheon-dong	National Route 3, National Route 36 overlap
Hapung IS	하풍 교차로	Pungdongdongmak-gil	Chungju City	Dalcheon-dong	National Route 3, National Route 36 overlap
Gaju IS	가주 교차로	Sogaju 1-gil	Chungju City	Dalcheon-dong	National Route 3, National Route 36 overlap
Yonggwan Tunnel	용관터널		Chungju City	Dalcheon-dong	National Route 3, National Route 36 overlap Right tunnel: Approximately 513m Left tunnel: Approximately 435m
Yongdu IS	용두 교차로	National Route 3 National Route 36 (Jungwon-daero)	Chungju City	Dalcheon-dong	National Route 3, National Route 36 overlap
Yongdu 1 Bridge	용두1교		Chungju City	Dalcheon-dong	
Yongdu 1 Bridge			Chungju City	Jungangtap-myeon	
Changdong IS	창동 교차로	Prefectural Route 82 (Tangeum-daero)	Chungju City	Jungangtap-myeon	
Ureuk Bridge	우륵대교		Chungju City	Jungangtap-myeon	
Ureuk Bridge			Chungju City	Geumga-myeon	
Yusong IS	유송 교차로	Gimsaeng-ro	Chungju City	Geumga-myeon	
Bansong Bridge	반송교		Chungju City	Geumga-myeon	
Munsan IS	문산 교차로	Boramae-ro	Chungju City	Dongnyang-myeon	
Saam IS	사암 교차로	Chungwon-daero	Chungju City	Geumga-myeon	
Geumga IS	금가 교차로	Gangsu-ro; Daemi-gil	Chungju City	Dongnyang-myeon	
East Chungju IC	동충주 나들목	Pyeongtaek–Jecheon Expressway	Chungju City	Sancheok-myeon	
Hayeong IS	하영 교차로	National Route 38 (Bukbu-ro)	Chungju City	Sancheok-myeon	
Yeongdeokcheon Bridge	영덕천교		Chungju City	Sancheok-myeon	
Eomjeong Bridge	엄정교		Chungju City	Eomjeong-myeon	
Eomjeong IS	엄정 교차로	Naechang-ro	Chungju City	Eomjeong-myeon	
Nongang Bridge	논강교		Chungju City	Eomjeong-myeon	
Dongmak Bridge	동막교		Chungju City	Sotae-myeon	
Dongmak IS	동막 교차로	Dongmaganmal-gil	Chungju City	Sotae-myeon	
Guryong IS	구룡 교차로	Guryong-ro	Chungju City	Sotae-myeon	
Sotaejae Tunnel	소태재터널		Chungju City	Sotae-myeon	Right tunnel: Approximately 453m Left tunnel: Approximately 448m
Sotae Overpass	소태육교		Chungju City	Sotae-myeon	Continuation into Gangwon Province

=== Gangwon Province ===
Name	Hangul name	Connection	Location		Note
Sotae Overpass	소태육교		Wonju City	Gwirae-myeon	North Chungcheong Province - Gangwon Province border line
Gwirae IS	귀래 교차로	Prefectural Route 531 (Unnam-gil)	Wonju City	Gwirae-myeon	
Ungye IS	운계 교차로	Ungyedadun-gil	Wonju City	Gwirae-myeon	
Ungye Tunnel	운계터널		Wonju City	Gwirae-myeon	Right tunnel: Approximately 494m Left tunnel: Approximately 475m
Baekun IS	백운 교차로	Gwiun-gil	Wonju City	Gwirae-myeon	
Maeji Tunnel	매지터널		Wonju City	Gwirae-myeon	Right tunnel: Approximately 690m Left tunnel: Approximately 661m
Maeji Tunnel			Wonju City	Heungeop-myeon	Right tunnel: Approximately 690m Left tunnel: Approximately 661m
Maeji IS	매지 교차로	Bugwon-ro	Wonju City	Heungeop-myeon	
Yonsei University Wonju Campus (Yonsei University IS)	연세대학교 원주캠퍼스 (연세대삼거리)	Yeonsedae-gil	Wonju City	Heungeop-myeon	
Musumak IS	무수막삼거리	Musumak 1-gil	Wonju City	Heungeop-myeon	
Heungeop IS	흥업 교차로	National Route 42; Prefectural Route 88 (Wonju Bypass Road)	Wonju City	Heungeop-myeon	National Route 42 overlap Prefectural Route 88 overlap
Heungeop Bridge	흥업교		Wonju City	Heungeop-myeon	National Route 42 overlap Prefectural Route 88 overlap
Seogok IS	서곡 교차로	Yongsugol-gil	Wonju City	Panbu-myeon	National Route 42 overlap Prefectural Route 88 overlap
Gwanseol IS	관설 교차로	National Route 5 Prefectural Route 88 (Chiang-ro)	Wonju City	Bangokgwanseol-dong	National Route 5, National Route 42 overlap Prefectural Route 88 overlap
Bangok IS	반곡 교차로	Ipchun-ro	Wonju City	Bangokgwanseol-dong	National Route 5, National Route 42 overlap
Bangok Underpass	반곡지하차도		Wonju City	Bangokgwanseol-dong	National Route 5, National Route 42 overlap
Haenggu 1 Bridge	행구1교		Wonju City	Bangokgwanseol-dong	National Route 5, National Route 42 overlap
Haenggu 1 Bridge			Wonju City	Haenggu-dong	National Route 5, National Route 42 overlap
Haenggu IS	행구 교차로	Ungok-ro; Haenggu-ro	Wonju City	Haenggu-dong	National Route 5, National Route 42 overlap
Bongsan 2 Bridge	봉산2교		Wonju City	Bongsan-dong	National Route 5, National Route 42 overlap
Bongsan Tunnel	봉산터널		Wonju City	Bongsan-dong	National Route 5, National Route 42 overlap Approximately 870m
Bongsan Tunnel			Wonju City	Socho-myeon	National Route 5, National Route 42 overlap Approximately 870m
Heungyang IS	흥양 교차로	National Route 42 (Norugogae-gil)	Wonju City	Socho-myeon	National Route 5, National Route 42 overlap
Wonjung Bridge Sinyang Bridge	원중교 신양대교		Wonju City	Socho-myeon	National Route 5 overlap
No name	(이름 없음)	Bugwon-ro	Wonju City	Socho-myeon	National Route 5 overlap
Nammun IS	남문사거리	Seombae-ro	Wonju City	Socho-myeon	National Route 5 overlap
Wonju Airport	원주공항	Dundun-ro; Hoengseong-ro	Wonju City	Socho-myeon	National Route 5 overlap
No name	(이름 없음)	Hoengseong-ro	Hoengseong County	Hoengseong-eup	National Route 5 overlap
Seongnam Elementary School Hoengseong Girls' High School	성남초등학교 횡성여자고등학교		Hoengseong County	Hoengseong-eup	National Route 5 overlap
Ipseok IC	입석 나들목	National Route 5 National Route 6 (Gyeongang-ro)	Hoengseong County	Hoengseong-eup	National Route 5, National Route 6 overlap
Eupsang IS	읍상 교차로	Hanu-ro	Hoengseong County	Hoengseong-eup	National Route 6 overlap
Masan IS	마산 교차로	Namsal-ro; Hanu-ro	Hoengseong County	Hoengseong-eup	National Route 6 overlap
Guman Overpass	구만육교	Hanu-ro	Hoengseong County	Hoengseong-eup	National Route 6 overlap
Chudong IS	추동 교차로	Prefectural Route 442 (Hanu-ro)	Hoengseong County	Hoengseong-eup	National Route 6 overlap
Yangyangpo IS	영영포 교차로	National Route 6 (Gyeonggang-ro); Chuyong-ro	Hoengseong County	Hoengseong-eup	National Route 6 overlap
No name	(이름 없음)	Chuyong-ro	Hoengseong County	Hoengseong-eup	
Okdong IS	옥동 교차로	Seongdong-ro; Taegi-ro	Hoengseong County	Hoengseong-eup	
Gubang Bridge	구방교		Hoengseong County	Gapcheon-myeon	
Gurigogae	구리고개		Hoengseong County	Gapcheon-myeon	
No name	(이름 없음)	Jeongpo-ro	Hoengseong County	Gapcheon-myeon	
Gapcheon Elementary School	갑천초등학교		Hoengseong County	Gapcheon-myeon	
(Maeil Bridge Entrance)	(매일교 입구)	Prefectural Route 420 (Gapcheon-ro)	Hoengseong County	Gapcheon-myeon	Prefectural Route 420 overlap
Yuldong-ri	율동리	Prefectural Route 420 (Oegapcheon-ro)	Hoengseong County	Gapcheon-myeon	Prefectural Route 420 overlap
(Yupyeong Bridge Entrance)	(유평교 입구)	Cheongil-ro	Hoengseong County	Cheongil-myeon	
Cheongil Elementary School Cheongil Middle School	청일초등학교 청일중학교		Hoengseong County	Cheongil-myeon	
No name	(이름 없음)	Bongdeok-ro	Hoengseong County	Cheongil-myeon	
Jujurijae	주주리재		Hoengseong County	Cheongil-myeon	Elevation 310m
Chundang Bridge Danggogae Chungdang Elementary School	춘당교 당고개 춘당초등학교		Hoengseong County	Cheongil-myeon	
Meondeuraejae	먼드래재		Hoengseong County	Cheongil-myeon	Elevation 466m
Meondeuraejae			Hongcheon County	Seoseok-myeon	Elevation 466m
Pungam Bridge	풍암교		Hongcheon County	Seoseok-myeon	
Pungam-ri	풍암리	National Route 56; Prefectural Route 56 (Guryongnyeong-ro)	Hongcheon County	Seoseok-myeon	Terminus
