= Wollyu-bong =

Mountain in South Korea

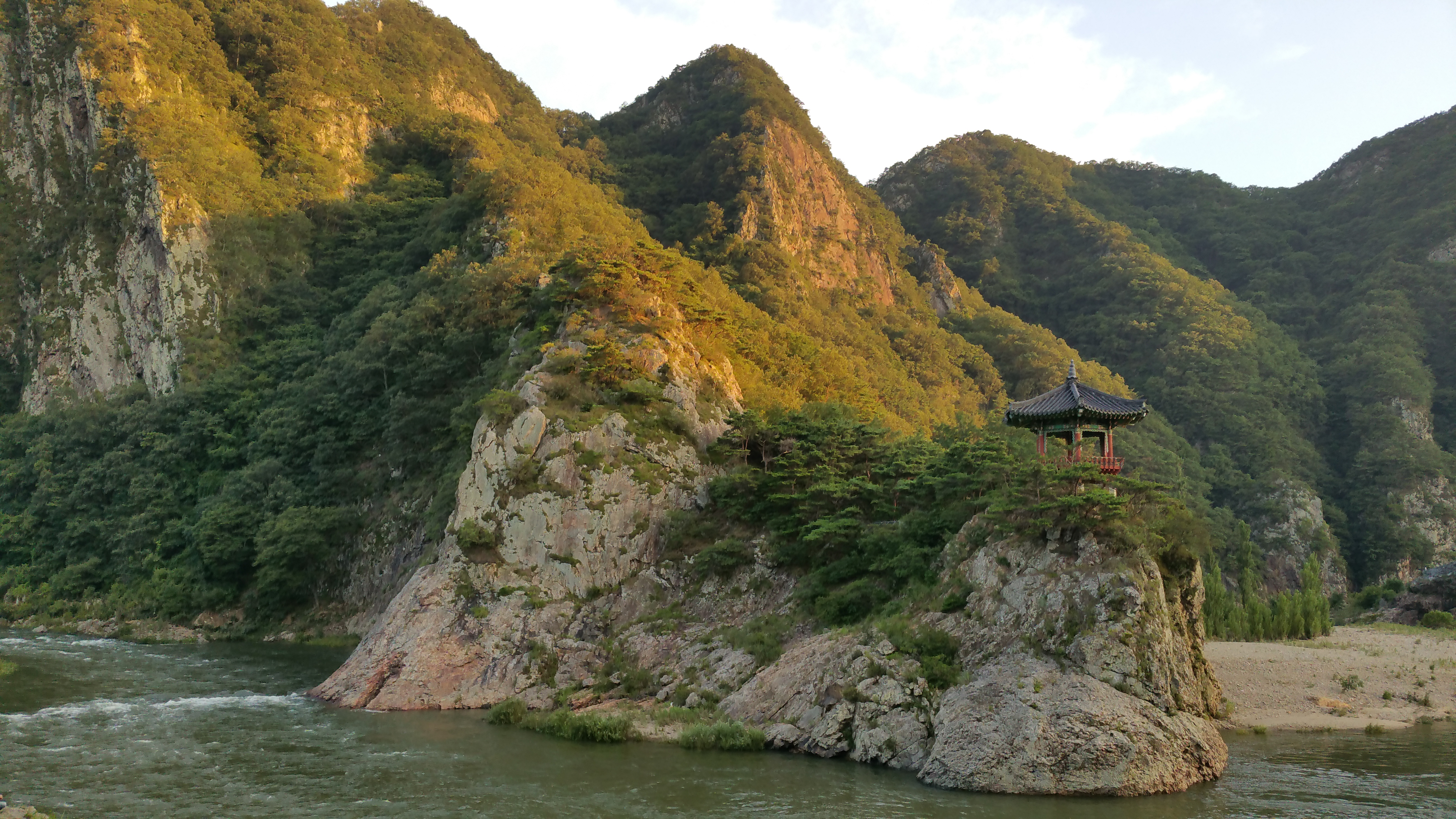
Wollyu-bong

Wollyu-bong (Hangul:월류봉; 月留峰) is a mountain peak located in Wonchon-ri, Hwanggan-myeon, Yeongdong County, Chungbuk, South Korea.

The height of the peak is 407 metres (1,335 ft), and is one of the 8 Scenic Sites of Hancheon (한천팔경).

It was named Wollyu, meaning a 'peak where the moon stops,' as a way to describe the beautiful view of the moonlight shining upon the cliff.

The 8 picturesque places on Wollyu Peak, which seems to have been sculpted and erected in Wonchon-ri, Hwanggan-myeon, are referred to as the 8 scenic sites of Hancheon.
