= Keimyung University station =

Station of the Daegu Metro

220 계명대 (신당) Keimyung Univ. (Sindang)
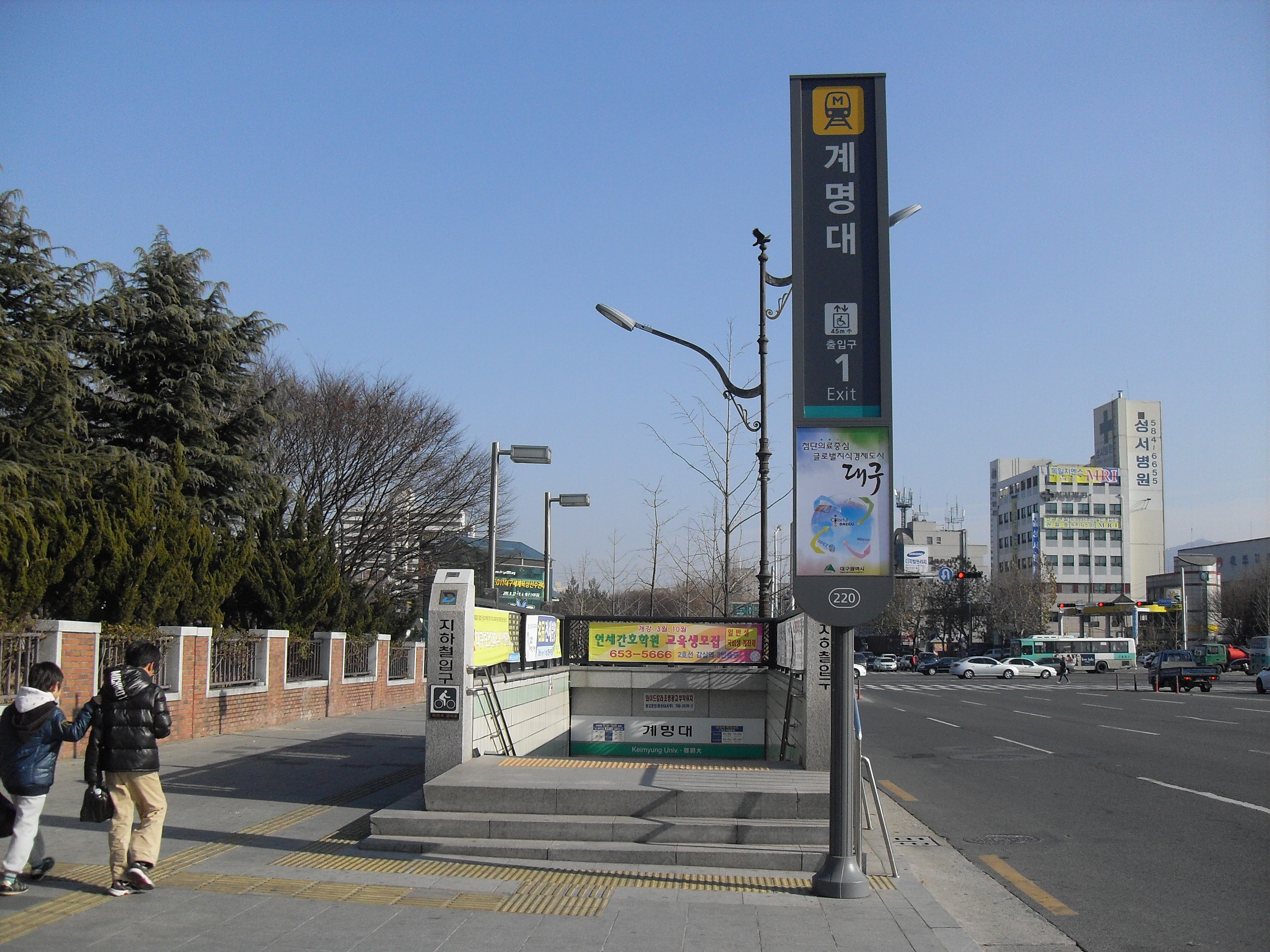
- Keimyung University Station Exit No.1

Korean name
- Hangul: 계명대역
- Hanja: 啓明大驛
- Revised Romanization: Gyemyeongdaeyeok
- McCune–Reischauer: Kyemyŏngdaeyŏk

General information
- Location: Sindang-dong, Dalseo District, Daegu; South Korea
- Coordinates: 35°51′05″N 128°29′30″E
- Operator: DTRO
- Line: Daegu Metro Line 2
- Platforms: 2
- Tracks: 2

Construction
- Structure type: Underground
- Accessible: yes

Other information
- Station code: 220

History
- Opened: October 18, 2005
Location

Keimyung University Station (Korean: 계명대역; Hanja: 啓明大驛) is a station of Daegu Metro Line 2 in Sindang-dong, Dalseo District, Daegu.

== See also ==
- Keimyung University

Preceding station	Daegu Metro	Following station
Gangchang towards Munyang	Line 2	Seongseo Industrial Complex towards Yeungnam University
