= Jukjeon station (Daegu Metro) =

Metro station in Daegu, South Korea

224 죽전 (구병원) Jukjeon (Koo Hospital)
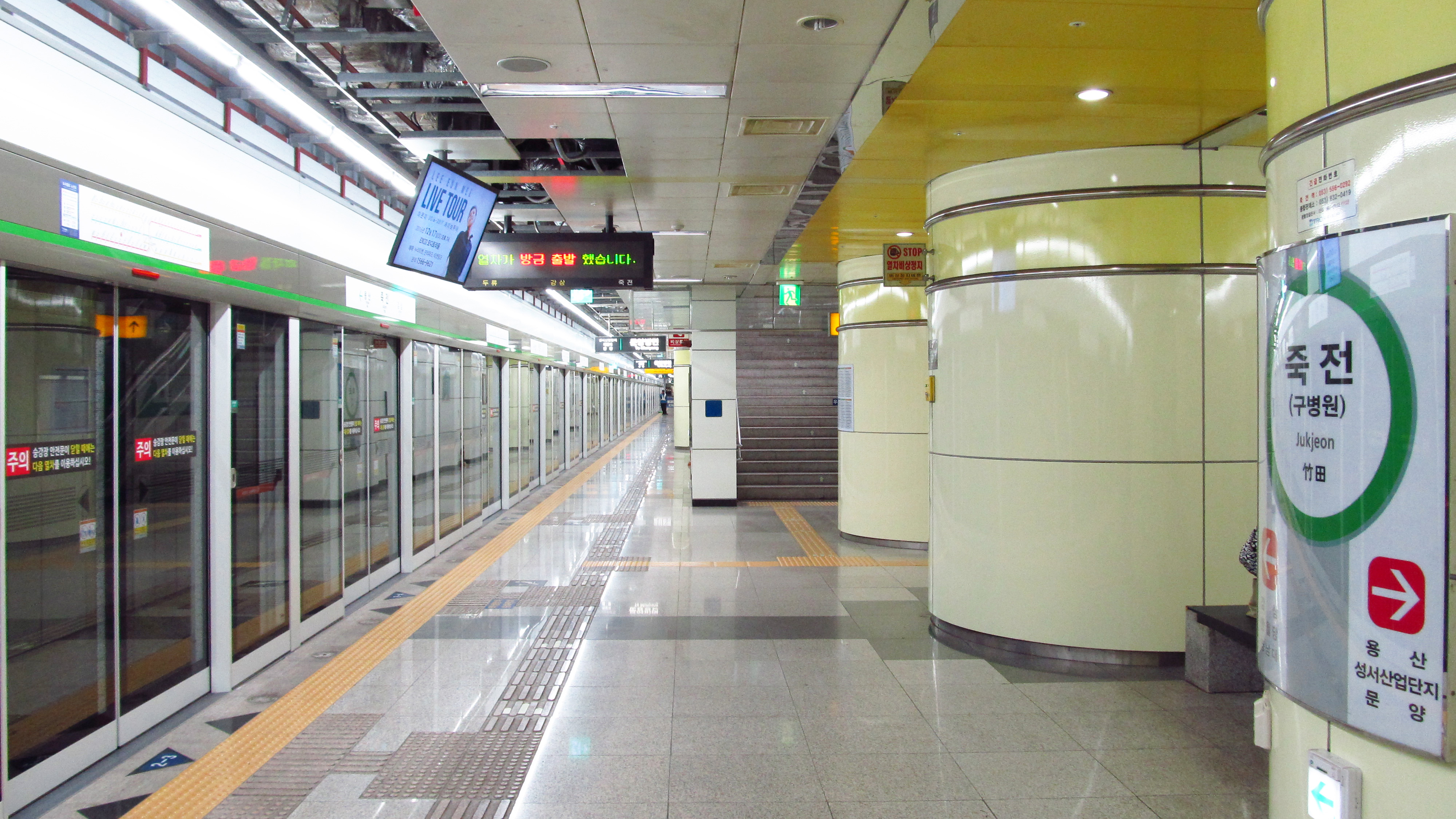
- Station platform

Korean name
- Hangul: 죽전역
- Hanja: 竹田驛
- Revised Romanization: Jukjeonnyeok
- McCune–Reischauer: Chukchŏnnyŏk

General information
- Location: Jukjeon-dong, Dalseo District, Daegu; South Korea
- Coordinates: 35°51′03″N 128°32′19″E
- Operator: DTRO
- Line: Daegu Metro Line 2
- Platforms: 1
- Tracks: 2

Construction
- Structure type: Underground
- Accessible: yes

Other information
- Station code: 224

History
- Opened: October 18, 2005
Location

Jukjeon Station is a station of Daegu Metro Line 2 in Jukjeon-dong, Dalseo District, Daegu.

Preceding station	Daegu Metro	Following station
Yongsan towards Munyang	Line 2	Gamsam towards Yeungnam University
