= Yongsan station (Daegu Metro) =

Station of the Daegu Metro

223 용산 (서부법원·검찰청입구) Yongsan (Seobu Branch Court·Seobu Prosecutor's Office)
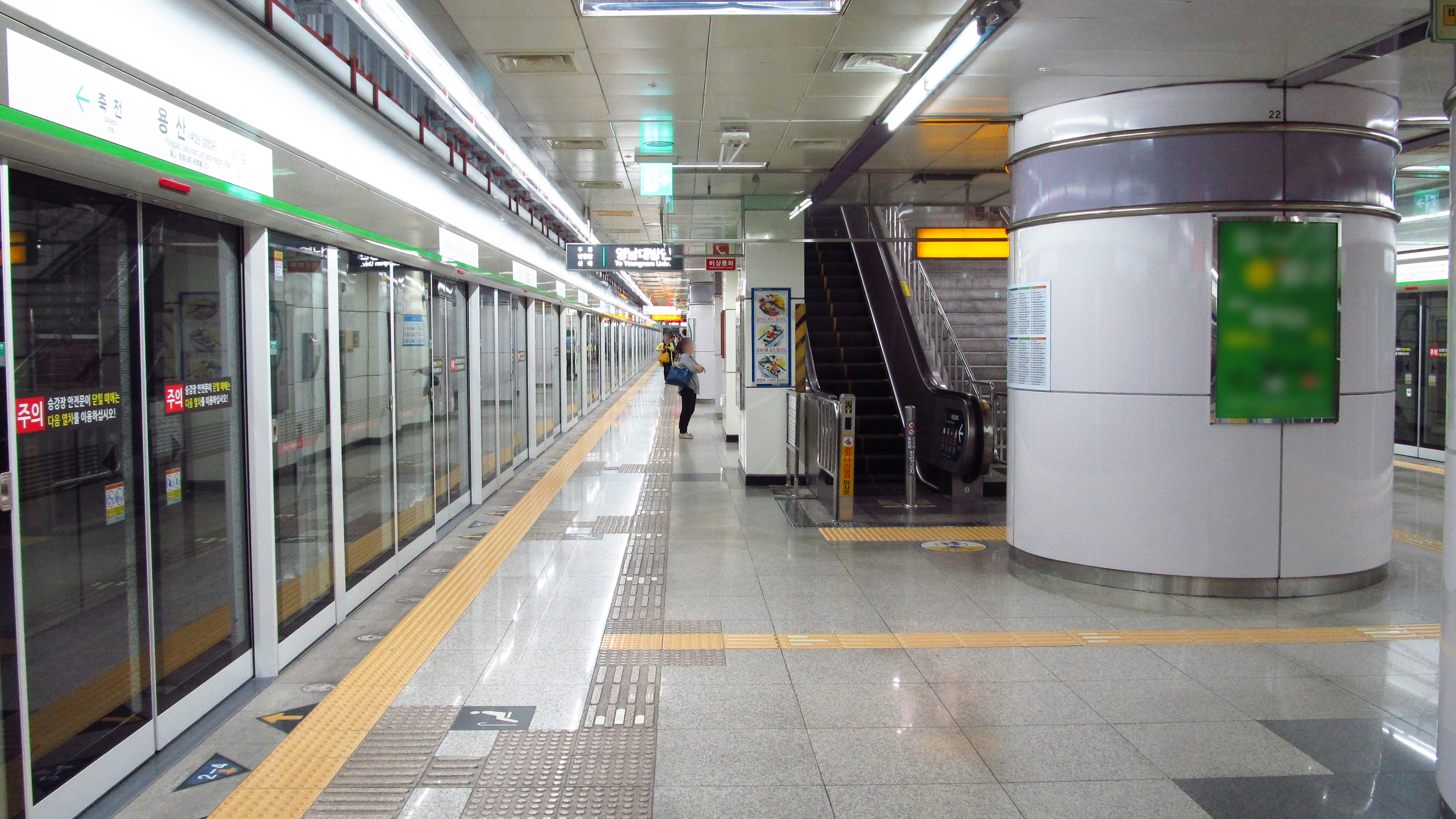
- Station platform

Korean name
- Hangul: 용산역
- Hanja: 龍山驛
- Revised Romanization: Yongsannyeok
- McCune–Reischauer: Yongsannyŏk

General information
- Location: Yongsan-dong, Dalseo District, Daegu; South Korea
- Coordinates: 35°50′57″N 128°31′44″E
- Operator: DTRO
- Line: Daegu Metro Line 2
- Platforms: 1
- Tracks: 2

Construction
- Structure type: Underground
- Accessible: yes

Other information
- Station code: 223

History
- Opened: October 18, 2005
Location

Yongsan Station is a station of Daegu Metro Line 2 in Yongsan-dong, Dalseo District, Daegu.

Preceding station	Daegu Metro	Following station
Igok towards Munyang	Line 2	Jukjeon towards Yeungnam University
