= Gamsam station =

Station of the Daegu Metro

225 감삼 (대구S한방병원) Gamsam (Daegu S Korean Medicine Hospital)
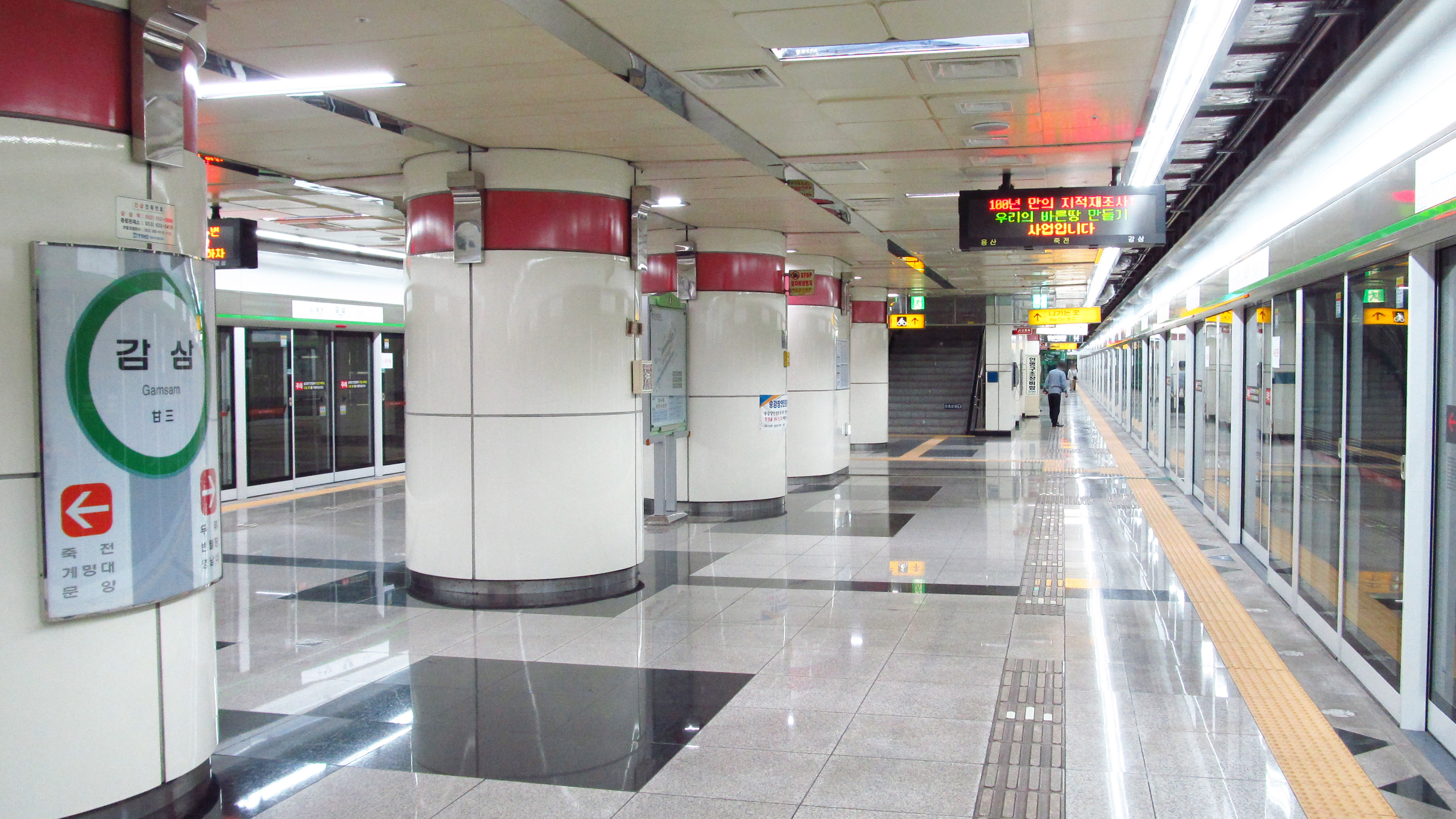
- Station platform

Korean name
- Hangul: 감삼역
- Hanja: 甘三驛
- Revised Romanization: Gamsamnyeok
- McCune–Reischauer: Kamsamnyŏk

General information
- Location: Gamsam-dong, Dalseo District, Daegu; South Korea
- Coordinates: 35°51′16″N 128°32′53″E
- Operator: DTRO
- Line: Daegu Metro Line 2
- Platforms: 1
- Tracks: 2

Construction
- Structure type: Underground
- Accessible: yes

Other information
- Station code: 225

History
- Opened: October 18, 2005
Location

Gamsam station (Korean: 감삼역) is a metro station of the Daegu Metro Line 2, located in Gamsam-dong, Duryu-dong, Dalseo District, South Korea.

Preceding station	Daegu Metro	Following station
Jukjeon towards Munyang	Line 2	Duryu towards Yeungnam University
