= Seongseo Industrial Complex station =

Station of the Daegu Metro

221 성서산업단지 ((주)엘앤에프) Seongseo Industrial Complex (L&F Co., Ltd.)
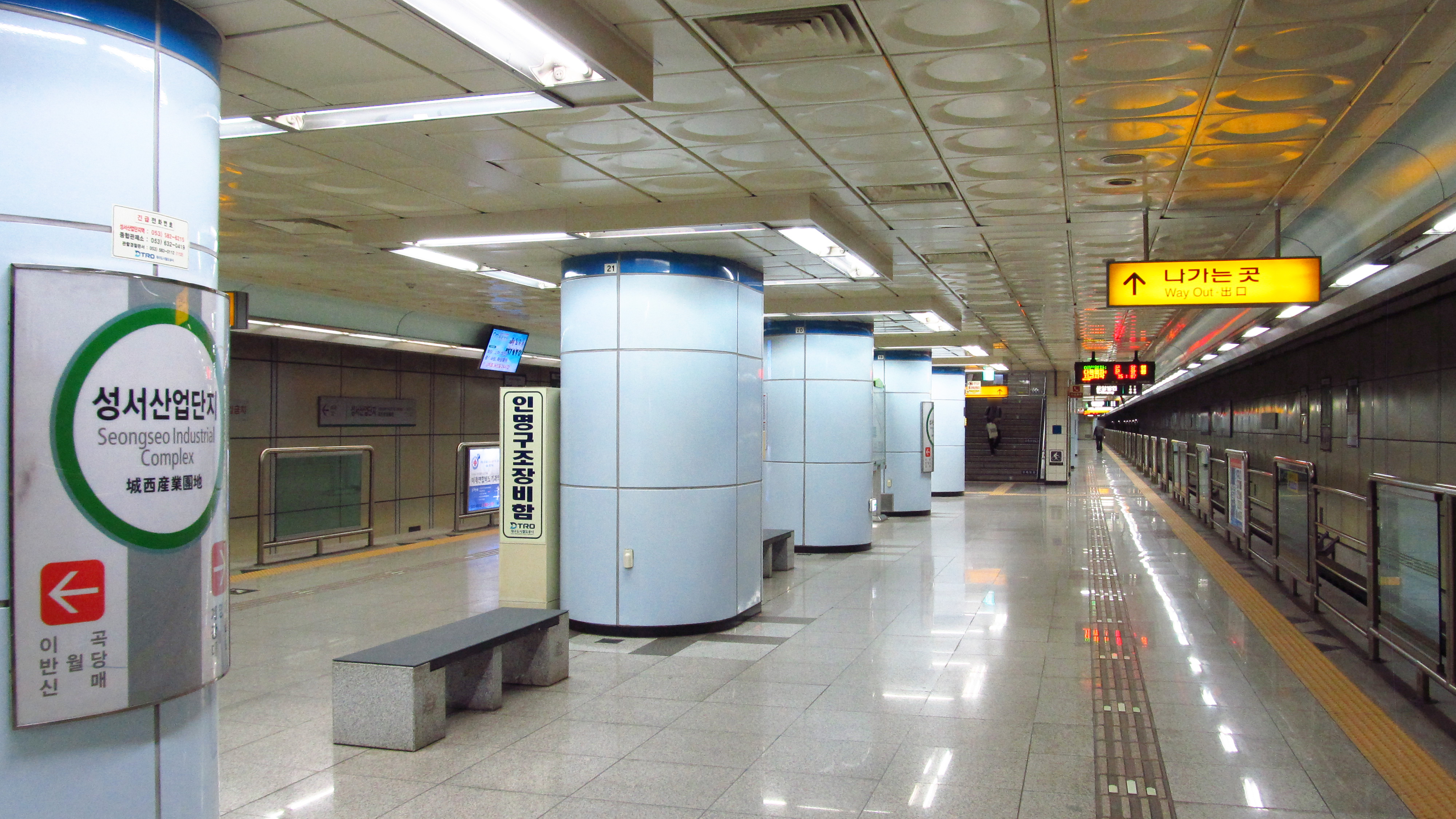
- Station platform

Korean name
- Hangul: 성서산업단지역
- Hanja: 城西産業團地驛
- Revised Romanization: Seongseo-saneopdanji-yeok
- McCune–Reischauer: Sŏngsŏ-sanŏptanji-yŏk

General information
- Location: Igok-dong, Dalseo District, Daegu; South Korea
- Coordinates: 35°51′06″N 128°30′26″E
- Operator: DTRO
- Line: Daegu Metro Line 2
- Platforms: 1
- Tracks: 2

Construction
- Structure type: Underground
- Accessible: yes

Other information
- Station code: 221

History
- Opened: October 18, 2005
Location

Seongseo Industrial Complex Station (Korean: 성서산업단지역; Hanja: 城西産業團地驛) is a station of Daegu Metro Line 2 in Igok-dong, Dalseo District, Daegu.

| Preceding station | Daegu Metro | Following station |
|---|---|---|
| Keimyung University towards Munyang | Line 2 | Igok towards Yeungnam University |
