= Igok station =

Station of the Daegu Metro

222 이곡 Igok
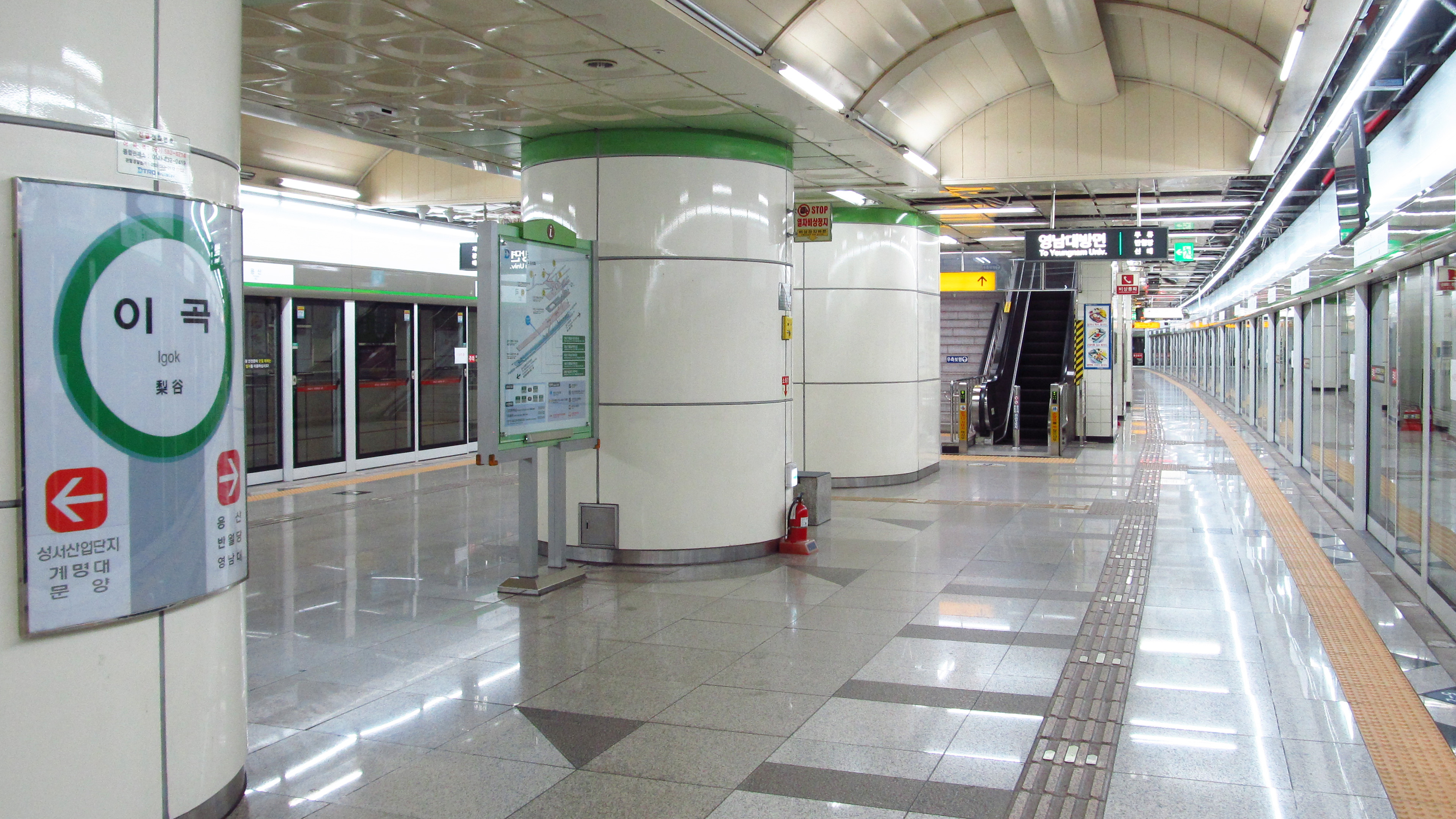
- Station platform

Korean name
- Hangul: 이곡역
- Hanja: 梨谷驛
- Revised Romanization: Igongnyeok
- McCune–Reischauer: Igongnyŏk

General information
- Location: Igok-dong, Dalseo District, Daegu; South Korea
- Coordinates: 35°51′02″N 128°30′57″E
- Operator: DTRO
- Line: Daegu Metro Line 2
- Platforms: 1
- Tracks: 2

Construction
- Structure type: Underground
- Accessible: yes

Other information
- Station code: 222

History
- Opened: October 18, 2005
Location

Igok Station is a station of the Daegu Metro Line 2 in Igok-dong, Dalseo District, Daegu.

Preceding station	Daegu Metro	Following station
Seongseo Industrial Complex towards Munyang	Line 2	Yongsan towards Yeungnam University
