= Taehwasan (Gyeonggi) =

Mountain in South Korea

Taehwasan (Gyeonggi-do)

Highest point
- Elevation: 641 m (2,103 ft)

Geography
- Location: South Korea

Taehwasan is a mountain of South Korea. It has an elevation of 641 metres.

== See also ==
- List of mountains of Korea
