= Yeongdong County =

Coordinates: 36°10′30″N 127°46′35″E

Yeongdong
- County
- Panoramic view of Yeongdong-eup

- Flag Emblem of Yeongdong

- Location in South Korea
- Country: South Korea
- Region: Hoseo
- Administrative divisions: 1 eup, 10 myeon

Government
  - Mayor: Jeong Yeong-chul(정영철)

Area
  - Total: 846.02 km^{2} (326.65 sq mi)

Population (2024)
  - Total: 43,680
  - Density: 68/km^{2} (180/sq mi)
  - Dialect: Chungcheong

Korean name
- Hangul: 영동군
- Hanja: 永同郡
- RR: Yeongdong-gun
- MR: Yŏngdong-gun

Yeongdong County (Korean: 영동군) is a county in North Chungcheong Province, South Korea. The county should not be confused with the similarly named Yeongdong region.

During the Korean War, this county was the site of the No Gun Ri Massacre.

== Climate ==
Yeongdong has a humid continental climate (Köppen: Dwa), but can be considered a borderline humid subtropical climate (Köppen: Cwa) using the −3 °C (27 °F) isotherm.

Climate data for Chupungnyeong, Yeongdong (1991–2020 normals, extremes 1937–present)
Month	Jan	Feb	Mar	Apr	May	Jun	Jul	Aug	Sep	Oct	Nov	Dec	Year
Record high °C (°F)	14.6 (58.3)	22.1 (71.8)	27.7 (81.9)	31.3 (88.3)	35.4 (95.7)	36.2 (97.2)	39.8 (103.6)	38.0 (100.4)	35.2 (95.4)	30.8 (87.4)	25.3 (77.5)	21.0 (69.8)	39.8 (103.6)
Mean daily maximum °C (°F)	2.9 (37.2)	5.9 (42.6)	11.8 (53.2)	18.7 (65.7)	23.7 (74.7)	26.8 (80.2)	28.7 (83.7)	29.1 (84.4)	25.0 (77.0)	19.7 (67.5)	12.5 (54.5)	5.1 (41.2)	17.5 (63.5)
Daily mean °C (°F)	−1.7 (28.9)	0.5 (32.9)	5.6 (42.1)	12.0 (53.6)	17.1 (62.8)	21.1 (70.0)	23.9 (75.0)	24.2 (75.6)	19.3 (66.7)	13.1 (55.6)	6.6 (43.9)	0.1 (32.2)	11.8 (53.2)
Mean daily minimum °C (°F)	−6.1 (21.0)	−4.5 (23.9)	−0.3 (31.5)	5.3 (41.5)	10.7 (51.3)	16.0 (60.8)	20.3 (68.5)	20.5 (68.9)	14.6 (58.3)	7.5 (45.5)	1.3 (34.3)	−4.4 (24.1)	6.7 (44.1)
Record low °C (°F)	−17.8 (0.0)	−16.2 (2.8)	−11.8 (10.8)	−5.0 (23.0)	1.5 (34.7)	5.7 (42.3)	11.5 (52.7)	11.5 (52.7)	4.1 (39.4)	−4.6 (23.7)	−10.7 (12.7)	−17.2 (1.0)	−17.8 (0.0)
Average precipitation mm (inches)	24.1 (0.95)	34.2 (1.35)	52.9 (2.08)	80.3 (3.16)	80.1 (3.15)	136.6 (5.38)	260.7 (10.26)	263.9 (10.39)	135.6 (5.34)	58.1 (2.29)	43.0 (1.69)	25.8 (1.02)	1,195.3 (47.06)
Average precipitation days (≥ 0.1 mm)	8.4	7.3	9.2	8.9	8.9	10.0	15.9	14.7	9.8	6.0	8.3	8.6	116
Average snowy days	10.6	7.3	4.4	0.3	0.0	0.0	0.0	0.0	0.0	0.2	2.2	8.0	33.0
Average relative humidity (%)	60.6	57.2	55.6	54.6	61.3	70.4	79.4	79.4	77.1	71.0	65.9	62.8	66.3
Mean monthly sunshine hours	176.1	179.3	206.7	217.5	234.6	184.9	145.9	156.9	167.1	201.1	167.2	168.7	2,206
Percentage possible sunshine	56.3	56.5	52.9	55.0	52.0	41.6	32.5	37.6	44.5	57.9	55.3	55.1	48.9
Source: Korea Meteorological Administration (snow and percent sunshine 1981–2010)

== Tourist attractions ==
8 Scenic Sites of Hancheon

- Wollyu-bong
- Sanyang-byeok
- Cheonghak-gul
- Yongyeon-dae
- Naengcheon-jeong
- Beopjon-am
- Sagung-bong
- Hwaeon-ak

== Twin towns – sister cities ==
Yeongdong is twinned with:

=== Domestic ===
- Seodaemun-gu, Seoul
- Yongsan-gu, Seoul
- Gangnam-gu, Seoul
- Osan, Gyeonggi

=== International ===
- Fangchenggang, Guangxi, China
- Dumaguete, Philippines
- Alameda, United States of America

== See also ==
- Geography of South Korea
