= Duryu station =

Station of the Daegu Metro

226 두류 (대구기독병원) Duryu (Daegu Christian Hospital)
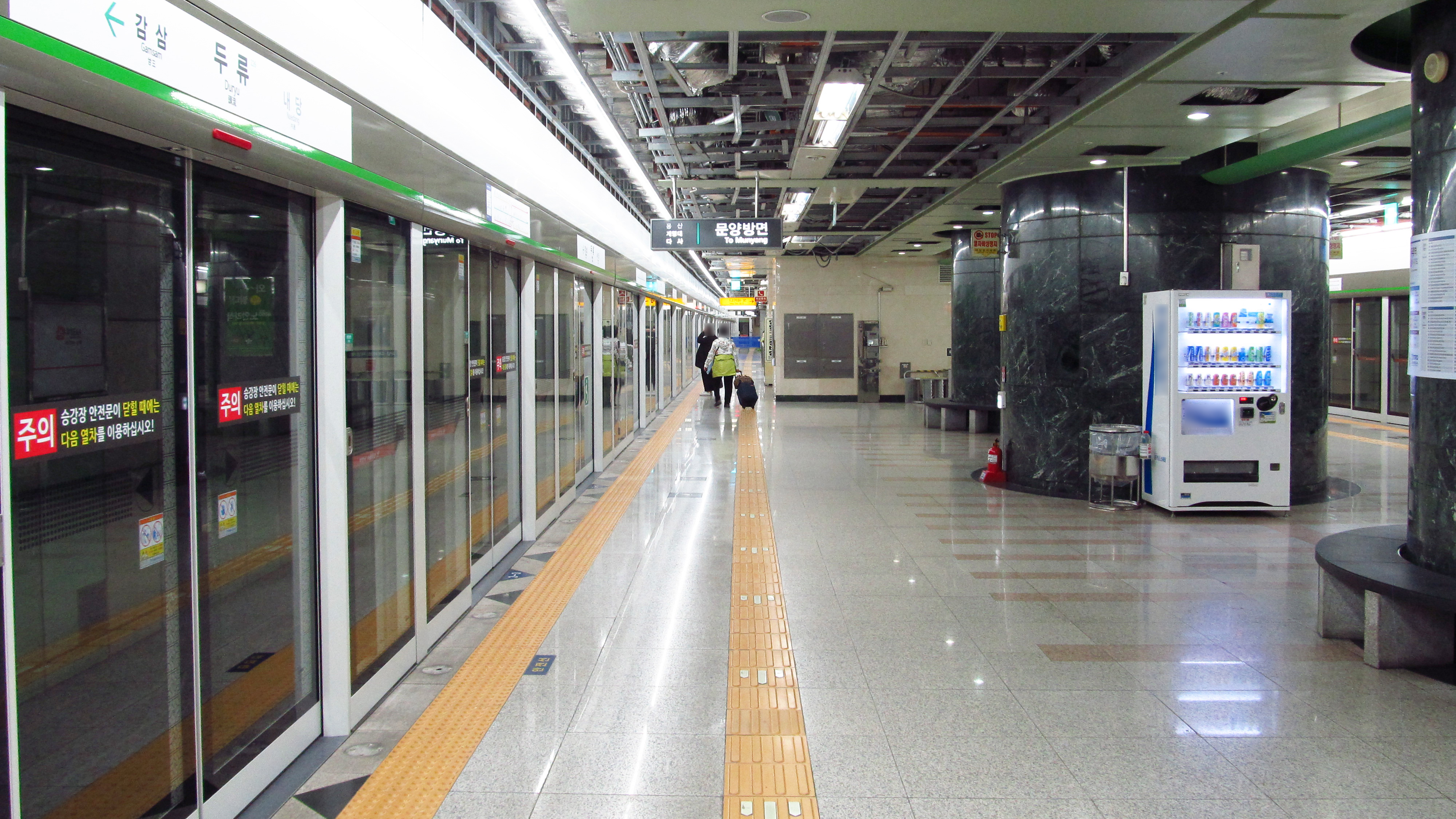
- Station platform

Korean name
- Hangul: 두류역
- Hanja: 頭流驛
- Revised Romanization: Duryuyeok
- McCune–Reischauer: Turyuyŏk

General information
- Location: Duryu-dong, Dalseo District, Daegu; South Korea
- Coordinates: 35°51′26″N 128°33′19″E
- Operator: DTRO
- Line: Daegu Metro Line 2
- Platforms: 1
- Tracks: 2

Construction
- Structure type: Underground
- Accessible: yes

Other information
- Station code: 226

History
- Opened: October 18, 2005
Location

Duryu Station (Korean:두류역) is a metro station of the Daegu Metro Line 2, located in Duryu-dong, Dalseo District in South Korea. It is near Duryu Park.

== Shopping street ==
Duryu Station is known for the underground shopping street located there.

In 2026, a new cultural space was opened at the far end of Duryu underground shopping street. It includes a book lounge, a stage, an open gallery exhibiting the work of local artists, spaces for workshops, and other areas where people can relax.

Preceding station	Daegu Metro	Following station
Gamsam towards Munyang	Line 2	Naedang towards Yeungnam University
