= Daesil station =

Metro station in Daegu, South Korea

218 대실 (죽곡연합통증의학과) Daesil (Jukgok Union Pain Medicine Department)
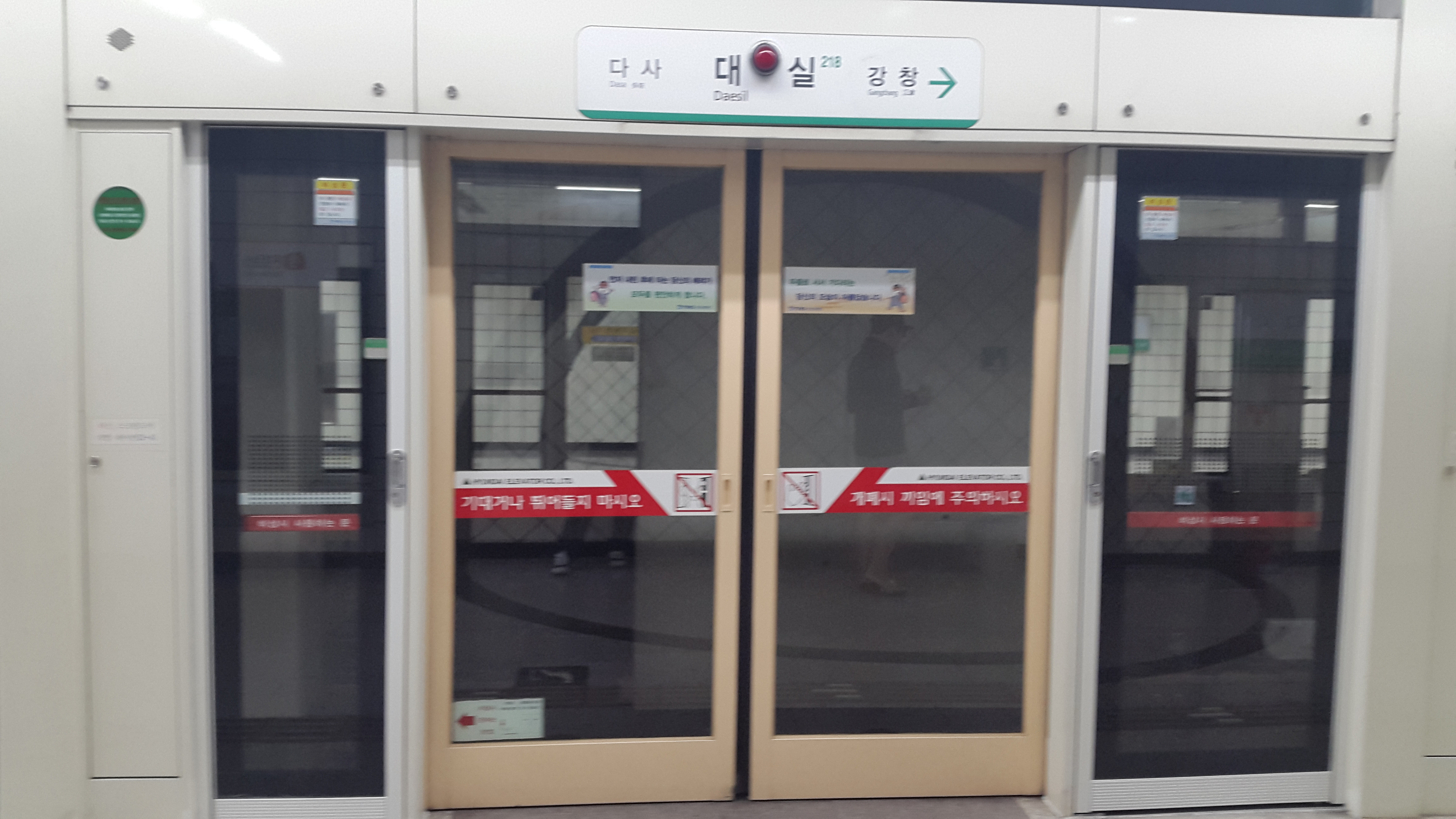
- Daesil Station automatic door

Korean name
- Hangul: 대실역
- Hanja: 대실驛
- Revised Romanization: Daesillyeok
- McCune–Reischauer: Taesillyŏk

General information
- Location: Jukgok-ri, Dasa-eup, Dalseong County, Daegu; South Korea
- Coordinates: 35°51′26″N 128°27′56″E
- Operator: DTRO
- Line: Daegu Metro Line 2
- Platforms: 2
- Tracks: 2

Construction
- Structure type: Underground
- Accessible: yes

Other information
- Station code: 218

History
- Opened: October 18, 2005
Location

Daesil Station (대실역) is a station of the Daegu Metro Line 2 in Jukgok-ri, Dasa-eup, Dalseong County, Daegu, South Korea. The Daesil or Sino-Korean word Jukgok (竹谷) means the bamboo village.

Preceding station	Daegu Metro	Following station
Dasa towards Munyang	Line 2	Gangchang towards Yeungnam University
