= Bangogae station =

Station of the Daegu Metro

228 반고개 (대구대학교 대구캠퍼스) Bangogae (Daegu Univ. Daegu Campus)
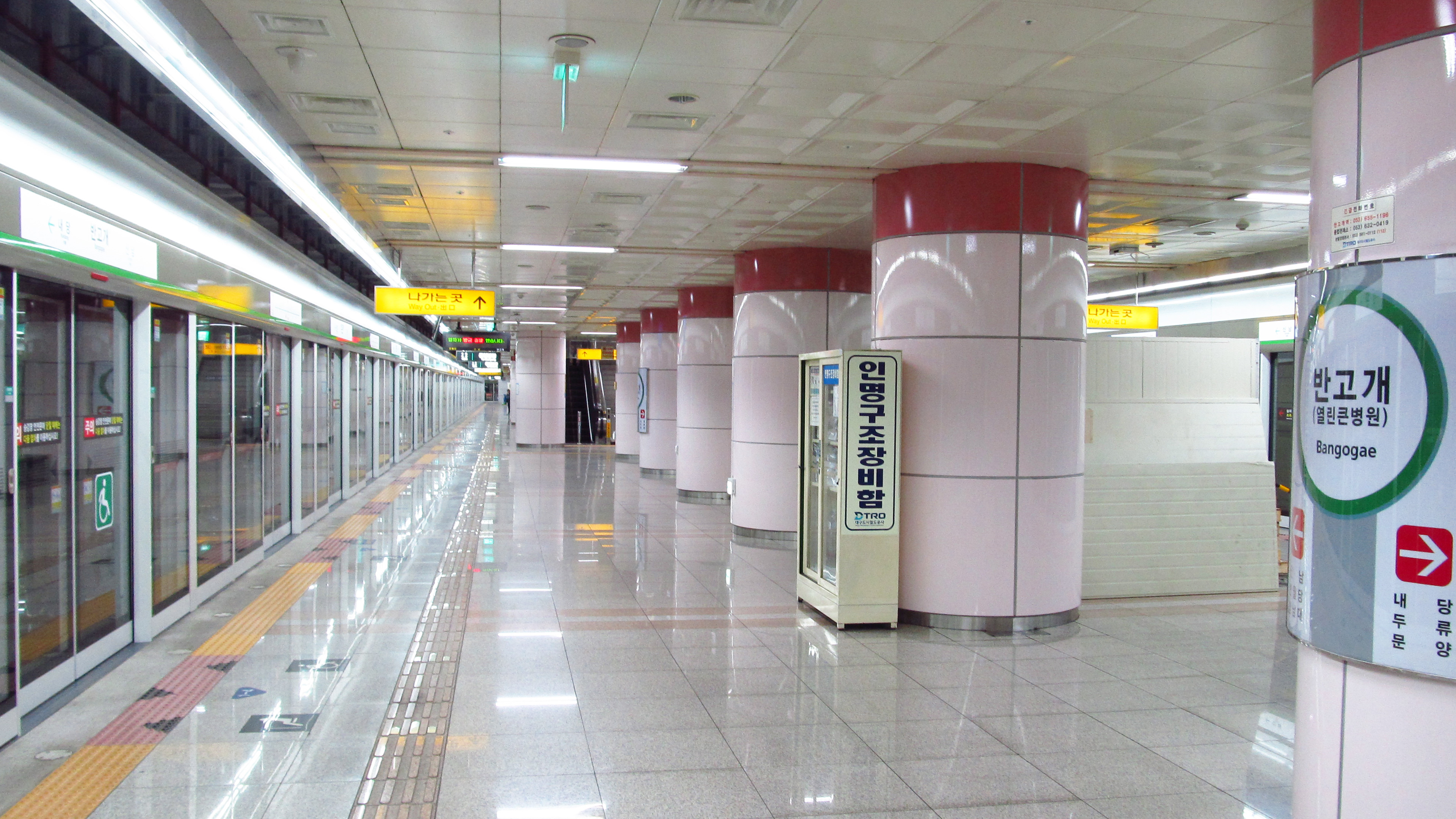
- Station platform

Korean name
- Hangul: 반고개역
- Hanja: 반고개驛
- Revised Romanization: Bangogaeyeok
- McCune–Reischauer: Pan'gogaeyŏk

General information
- Location: Duryu-dong, Dalseo District, Daegu; South Korea
- Coordinates: 35°51′45″N 128°34′25″E
- Operator: DTRO
- Line: Daegu Metro Line 2
- Platforms: 1
- Tracks: 2

Construction
- Structure type: Underground
- Accessible: yes

Other information
- Station code: 228

History
- Opened: October 18, 2005
Location

Bangogae Station is a station of the Daegu Metro Line 2 in Naedang-dong, Seo District, and Duryu-dong, Dalseo District, Daegu, South Korea.

Preceding station	Daegu Metro	Following station
Naedang towards Munyang	Line 2	Cheongna Hill towards Yeungnam University
