= Naedang station =

Station of the Daegu Metro

227 내당 (참튼튼병원) Naedang (Cham Tun Tun Hospital)
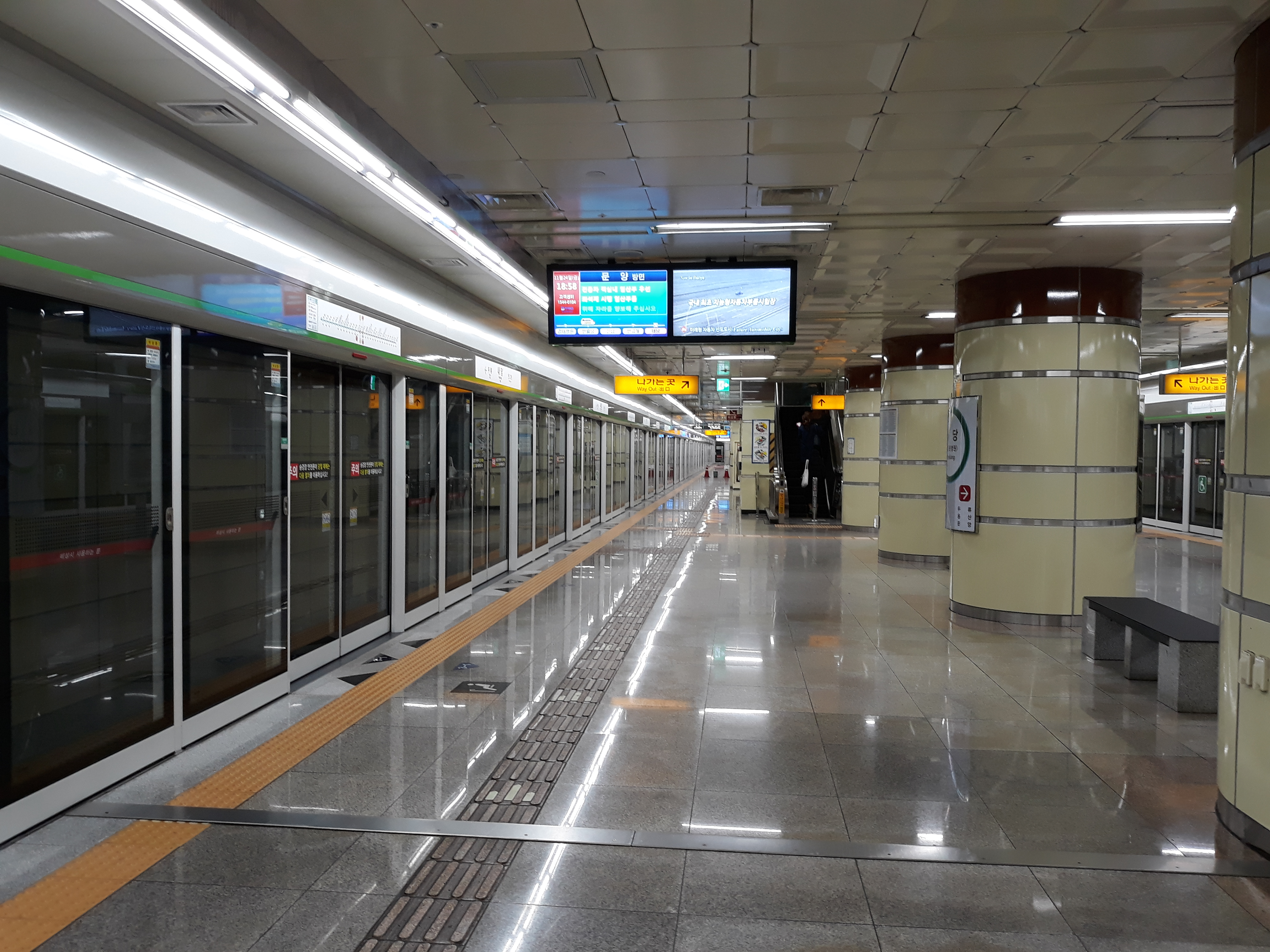
- Station platform

Korean name
- Hangul: 내당역
- Hanja: 內唐驛
- Revised Romanization: Naedangyeok
- McCune–Reischauer: Naedangyŏk

General information
- Location: Naedang-dong, Seo District, Daegu; South Korea
- Coordinates: 35°51′37″N 128°33′53″E
- Operator: DTRO
- Line: Daegu Metro Line 2
- Platforms: 1
- Tracks: 2

Construction
- Structure type: Underground
- Accessible: yes

Other information
- Station code: 227

History
- Opened: October 18, 2005
Location

Naedang Station is a station of Daegu Metro Line 2 in Naedang-dong, Seo District, and Duryu-dong, Dalseo District, Daegu, South Korea.

| Preceding station | Daegu Metro | Following station |
|---|---|---|
| Duryu towards Munyang | Line 2 | Bangogae towards Yeungnam University |
