= Jeongpyeong station =

Station of the Daegu Metro

242 정평 Jeongpyeong
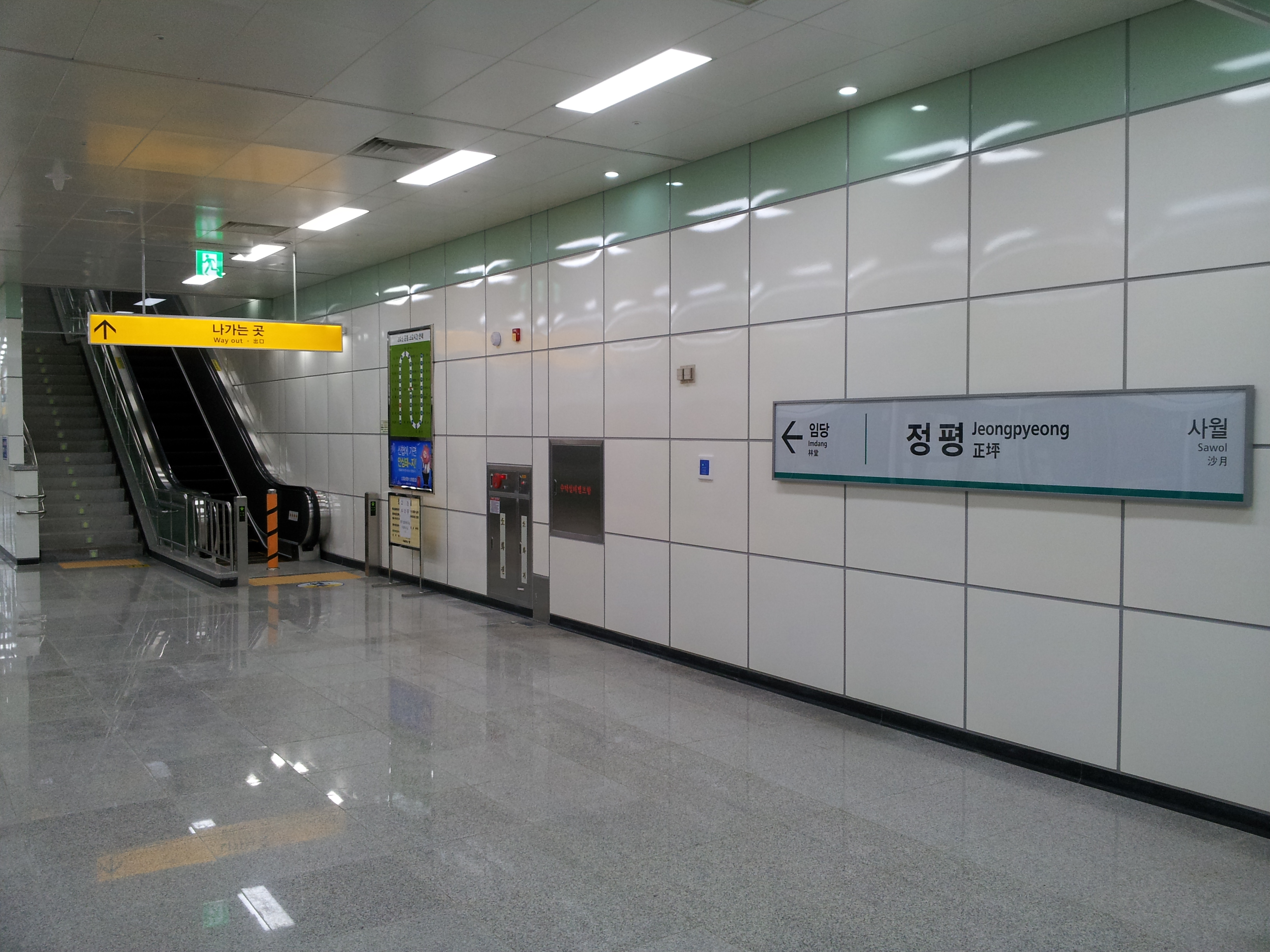
- Station name plate

Korean name
- Hangul: 정평역
- Hanja: 正坪驛
- Revised Romanization: Jeongpyeongyeok
- McCune–Reischauer: Chŏngp'yŏngyŏk

General information
- Location: Jeongpyeong-dong, Gyeongsan, North Gyeongsang Province; South Korea
- Coordinates: 35°50′02″N 128°43′46″E
- Operator: DTRO
- Line: Daegu Metro Line 2
- Platforms: 2
- Tracks: 2

Construction
- Structure type: Underground
- Accessible: yes

Other information
- Station code: 242

History
- Opened: September 19, 2012
Location

Jeongpyeong Station (Korean: 정평역; Hanja: 正坪驛; RR: Jeongpyeong-yeok) is a station of Daegu Metro Line 2 in Jeongpyeong-dong, Gyeongsan, North Gyeongsang Province, South Korea.

== Gallery ==
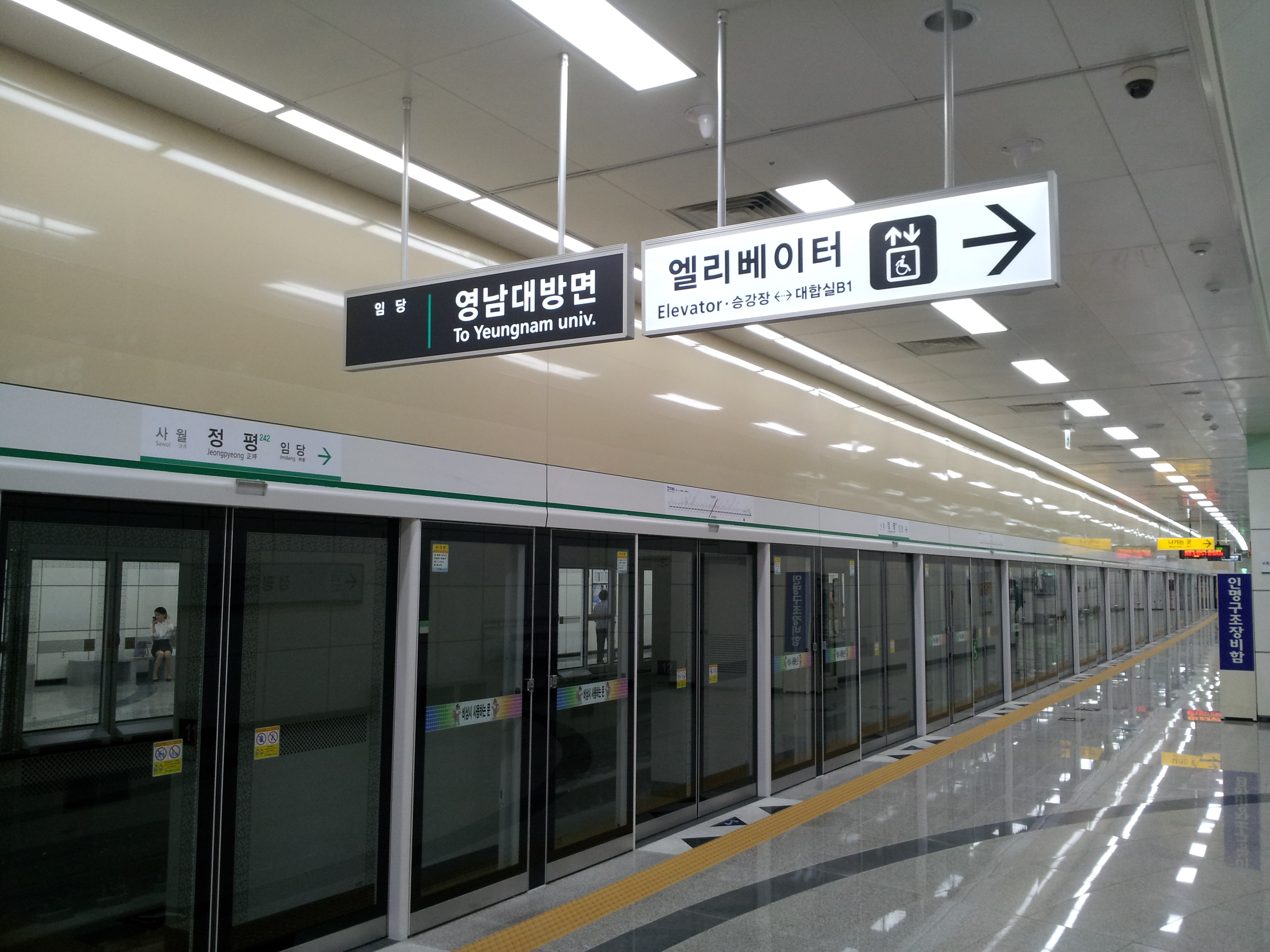
Station platform

Preceding station	Daegu Metro	Following station
Sawol towards Munyang	Line 2	Imdang towards Yeungnam University
