= Damti station =

Station of the Daegu Metro

236 담티 (수성대·대륜) Damti (Suseong College·Daeryun Middle & High School)
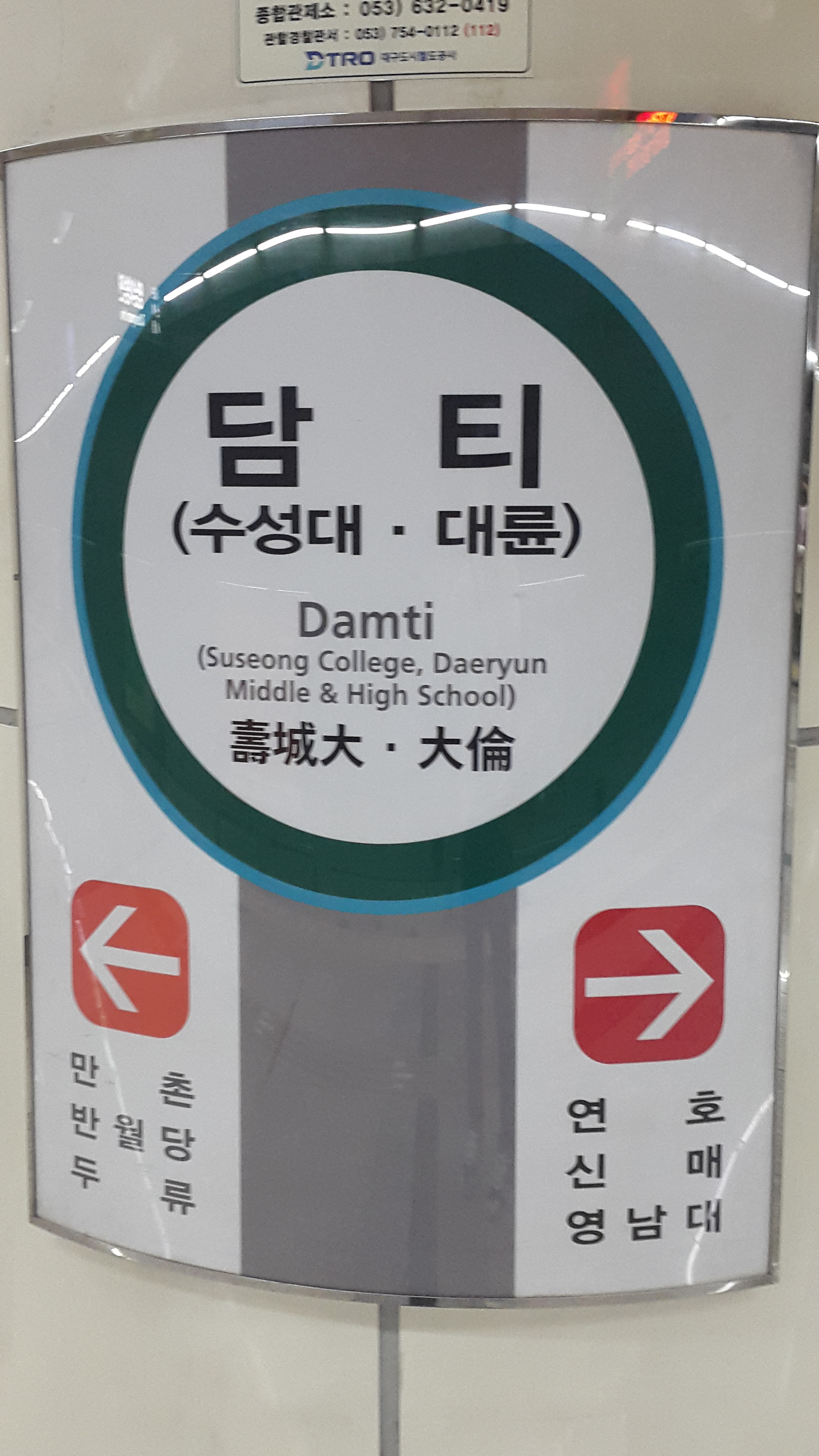
- Station sign

Korean name
- Hangul: 담티역
- Hanja: 담티驛
- Revised Romanization: Damti-yeok
- McCune–Reischauer: Tamt'i-yŏk

General information
- Location: Manchon-dong, Suseong District, Daegu; South Korea
- Coordinates: 35°51′17″N 128°39′14″E
- Operator: DTRO
- Line: Daegu Metro Line 2
- Platforms: 1
- Tracks: 2

Construction
- Structure type: Underground

Other information
- Station code: 236

History
- Opened: October 18, 2005
Location

Damti station (Korean: 담티역) is a station of the Daegu Metro Line 2 in Manchon-dong, Suseong District, Daegu, South Korea. It is named after Damtigogae mountain pass and is also called Suseong College and Daeryun High School Station.

== History ==
October 18, 2005: Opened.

== See also ==
- Daeryun High School

| Preceding station | Daegu Metro | Following station |
|---|---|---|
| Manchon towards Munyang | Line 2 | Yeonho towards Yeungnam University |
