= Beomeo station =

Station of the Daegu Metro

233 범어 (메트로안과) Beomeo (Metro Eye Clinic)
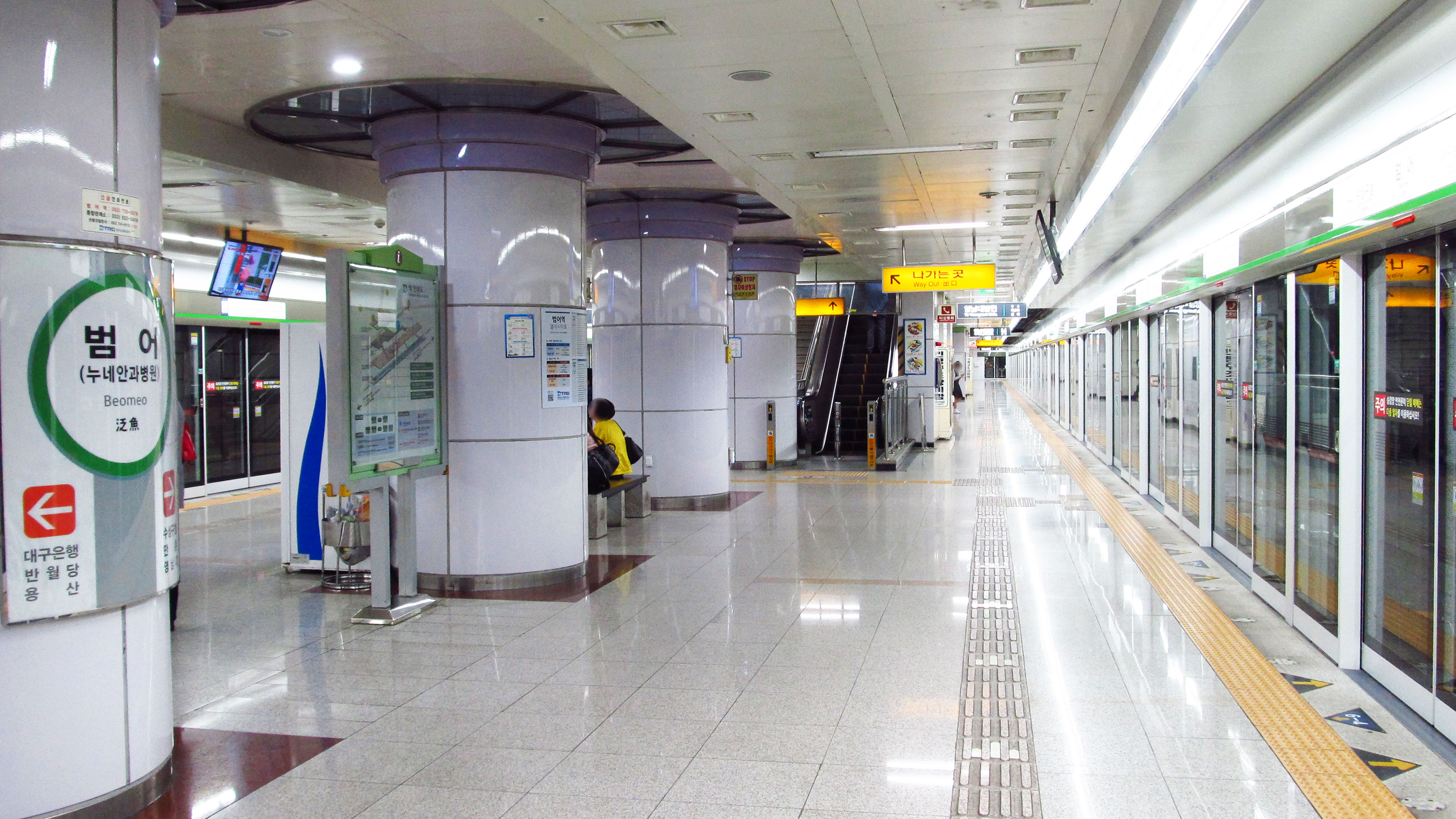
- The platform in October 2016

Korean name
- Hangul: 범어역
- Hanja: 泛魚驛
- Revised Romanization: Beomeoyeok
- McCune–Reischauer: Pŏmŏyŏk

General information
- Location: Beomeo-dong, Suseong District, Daegu; South Korea
- Coordinates: 35°51′33″N 128°37′34″E
- Operator: DTRO
- Line: Daegu Metro Line 2
- Platforms: 1
- Tracks: 2

Construction
- Structure type: Underground

Other information
- Station code: 233

History
- Opened: October 18, 2005
Location

Beomeo Station is a station of the Daegu Metro Line 2 in Beomeo-dong, Suseong District, Daegu, South Korea. The Daegu Court and Public Prosecutor's Office are in the vicinity of the station.

== History ==
October 18, 2005: Opened.

== Station Facts ==
This station is at Beomeo Intersection. When it first opened, the exits were skewed (four exits at that time) to the west downtown side of Daelgubeol-daero, and so it was inconvenient to transfer from the downtown bus. In 2006, when the Beomeo-dong Doosan We've the Zenith Apartments were constructed at Beomeo-2-dong, approval for the apartment construction was granted in the process of the transportation impact survey, on the condition that land be donated for an underground walkway and stores that connect Beomeo Station. As a result, the exists were expanded. 7 exits were newly created in front of Grand Hotel, KTCU, Beomeo-dong Doosan We've the Zenith Apartments, in the vicinity of the Suseonggu- Station and Daegu-Suseong Police Department, and were opened on February 1, 2010. When the exits were expanded, Beomeo World Plaza, an underground store, was newly constructed, in the same manner as Duryu Station, however, development was slow because no stores were coming in, and instead, Daegu City English Street (E-Street) was made instead on April 24, 2012. However, the Daegu City English Street was not immune from economic downtown, and there was a risk that it may discontinue operations. Exit number 7, which was newly constructed in 2010, is near Suseong-gu Office and Suseong Police Department, and it is closer to Suseong-gu Office than Suseong-gu Office Station is.

When major public events are held in the area of Beomeo Intersection, there are times when access to Beomeo Station is blocked.

Once Suseong District Stadium Station opened, the demand was split along the line towards East Daegu, and ridership decreased greatly. However, since ridership was still higher compared to other stations on Line No. 2, screen doors were installed in 2016 for safety.

The alternative name of this station was Nune Eye Hospital, but this was removed on September 4, 2017.

At Beomeo Station, an exhibition is being held under the name 'Beomeo Art Street'. Since it changes periodically, it is recommended to refer to the event schedule when planning a visit.

== Ridership Changes ==
Ridership greatly increased once the exits were expanded in 2010 however, after 대구 도시철도 3호선 수성구민운동장역 opened, the demand was split towards East Daegu, and ridership greatly decreased. Presently it has the sixth largest ridership of stations on Line No. 2.

Line	Riders													Notes
Line	2005	2006	2007	2008	2009	2010	2011	2012	2013	2014	2015	2016	2017	Notes
Line No. 2	4,367	5,326	5,491	5,779	5,966	7,081	7,699	8,299	8,957	9,156	8,574	8,188		

Preceding station	Daegu Metro	Following station
Daegu Bank towards Munyang	Line 2	Suseong-gu Office towards Yeungnam University
