= Gangchang station =

Station of the Daegu Metro

219 강창 (계명대학교 동산병원) Gangchang (Keimyung Univ. Dongsan Hospital)
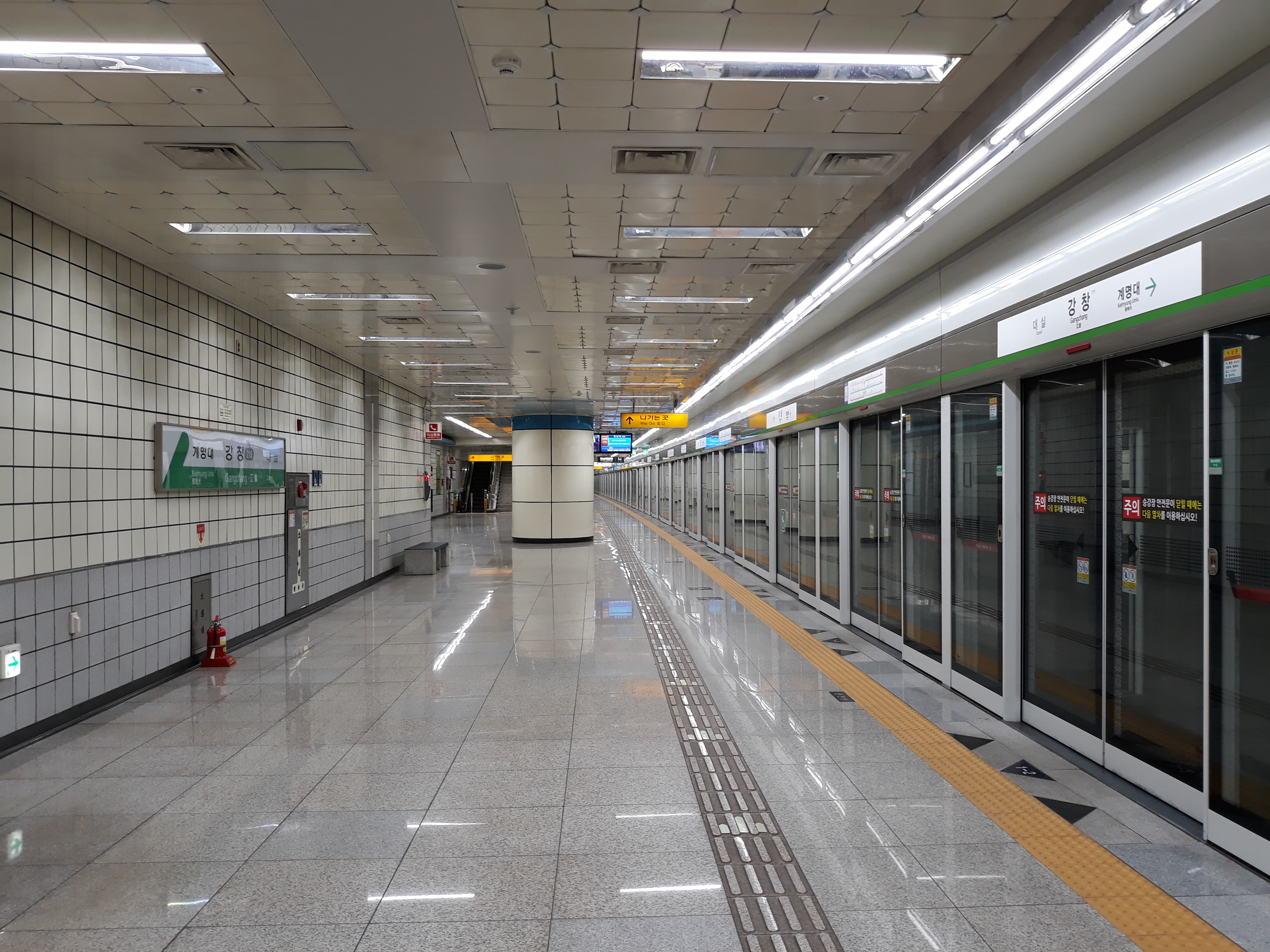
- Gangchang Station platform

Korean name
- Hangul: 강창역
- Hanja: 江倉驛
- Revised Romanization: Gangchangyeok
- McCune–Reischauer: Kangch'angyŏk

General information
- Location: Hosan-dong, Dalseo District, Daegu; South Korea
- Coordinates: 35°51′11″N 128°28′45″E
- Operator: DTRO
- Line: Daegu Metro Line 2
- Platforms: 2
- Tracks: 2

Construction
- Structure type: Underground
- Accessible: yes

Other information
- Station code: 219

History
- Opened: October 18, 2005
Location

Gangchang Station (Korean: 강창역; Hanja: 江倉驛; RR: Gangchang-yeok) is a station of the Daegu Metro Line 2 in Hosan-dong, Dalseo District, Daegu, South Korea.

== Origin of the name ==
Gangchang, a warehouse built to store and transport rice by boat, was established along the Nakdong River near Gangchang Bridge in Hosan-dong, Paho-dong. And the area is still called Gangchang.

Preceding station	Daegu Metro	Following station
Daesil towards Munyang	Line 2	Keimyung University towards Yeungnam University
