= Daegu Bank station =

Station of the Daegu Metro

232 대구은행 (대구교육청) Daegu Bank (Daegu Metropolitan Office of Education)
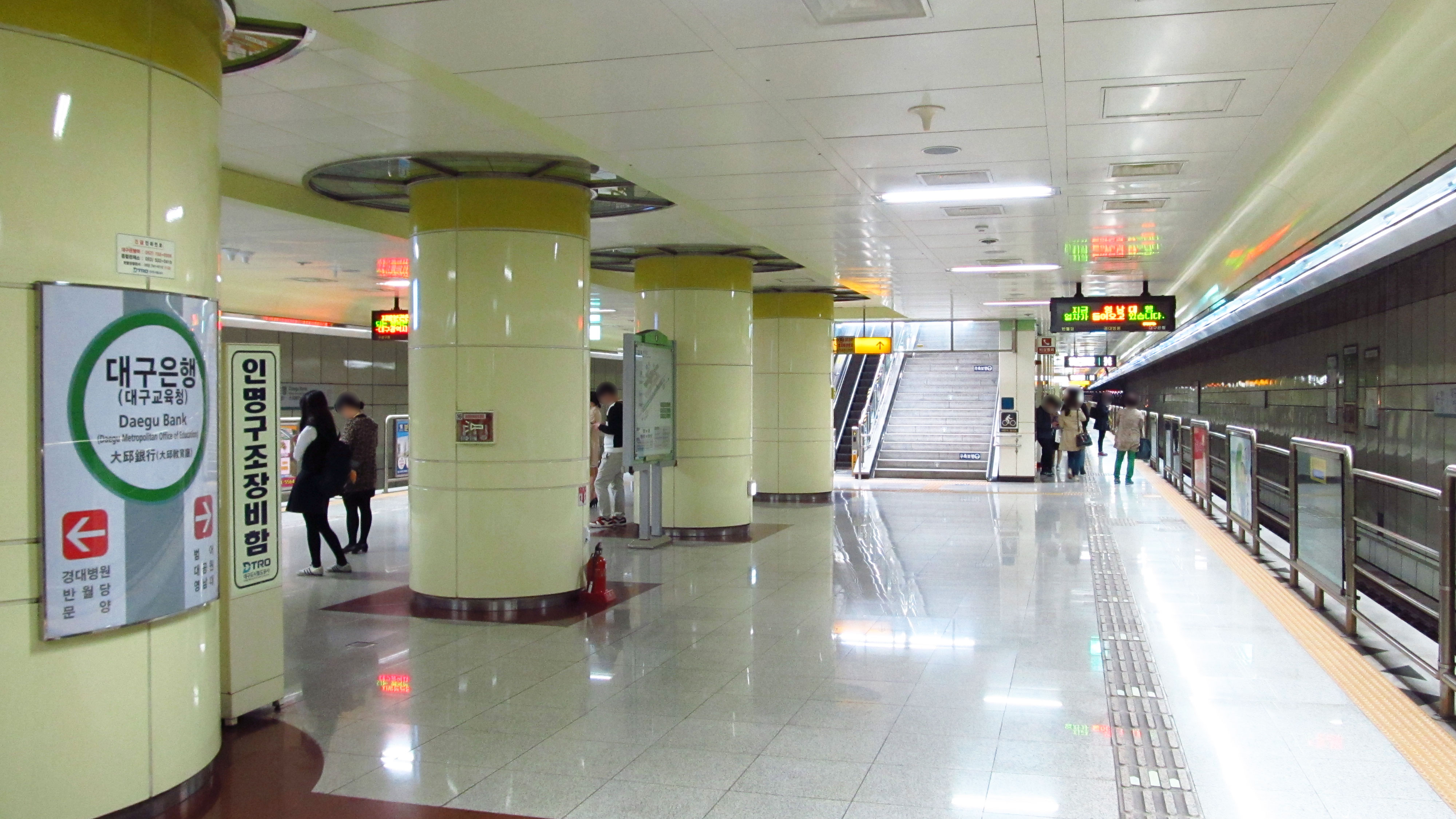
- Station platform

Korean name
- Hangul: 대구은행역
- Hanja: 大邱銀行驛
- Revised Romanization: Daegu-eunhaeng-yeok
- McCune–Reischauer: Taegu-ŭnhaeng-yŏk

General information
- Location: Suseong-dong, Suseong District, Daegu; South Korea
- Coordinates: 35°51′35″N 128°36′50″E
- Operator: DTRO
- Line: Daegu Metro Line 2
- Platforms: 1
- Tracks: 2

Construction
- Structure type: Underground

Other information
- Station code: 232

History
- Opened: October 18, 2005
Location

Daegu Bank Station is a station of the Daegu Metro Line 2 in Suseong-dong, Suseong District, Daegu, South Korea. There are Daegu Bank headquarters around the station.

== History ==
October 18, 2005: Opened.

== See also ==
- Daegu Bank

Preceding station	Daegu Metro	Following station
Kyungpook National University Hospital towards Munyang	Line 2	Beomeo towards Yeungnam University
