= Gosan station =

Station of the Daegu Metro

239 고산 Gosan
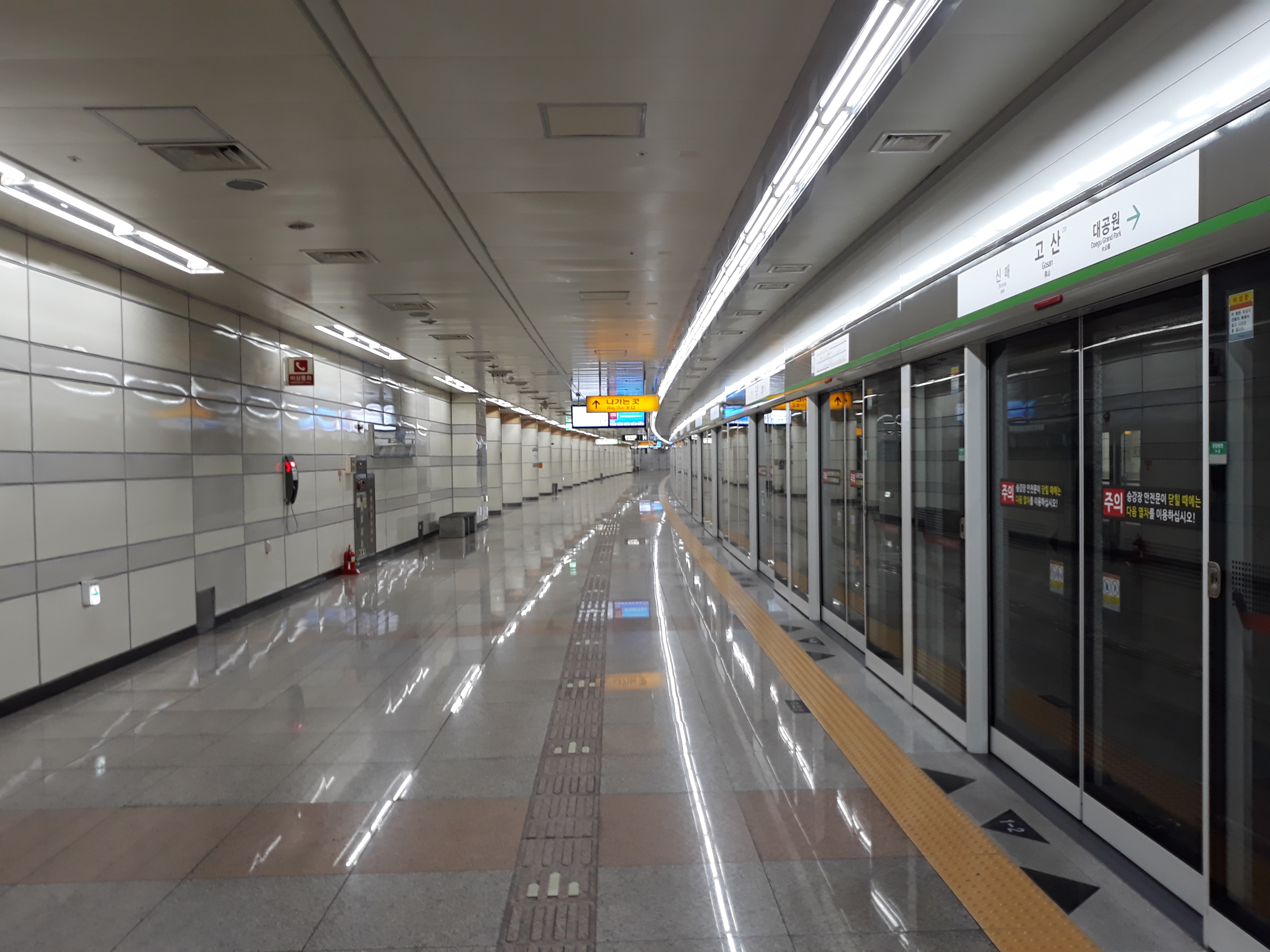
- Station platform

Korean name
- Hangul: 고산역
- Hanja: 孤山驛
- Revised Romanization: Gosannyeok
- McCune–Reischauer: Kosannyŏk

General information
- Location: Siji-dong, Suseong District, Daegu; South Korea
- Coordinates: 35°50′35″N 128°41′35″E
- Operator: DTRO
- Line: Daegu Metro Line 2
- Platforms: 2
- Tracks: 2

Construction
- Structure type: Underground

Other information
- Station code: 239

History
- Opened: October 18, 2005
Location

Gosan Station (Korean: 고산역; Hanja: 孤山驛; RR: Gosan-yeok) is a station of the Daegu Metro Line 2 in Siji-dong, Suseong District, Daegu, South Korea. While Siji-dong is a single legal dong, Gosan-dong is the administrative dong.

== History ==
October 18, 2005: Opened.

== Around the station ==
Gushan Post Office

Gosan 2-dong Security Center

Lubian Middle School

Ashibeon Elementary School

Daegu Gosan Elementary School

Daegu Bank Gosan Branch

Korean Agricultural Association Gusan Branch Warehouse

Jiachuan Station

Preceding station	Daegu Metro	Following station
Suseong Alpha City towards Munyang	Line 2	Sinmae towards Yeungnam University
