= Dasa station =

Station of the Daegu Metro

217 다사 Dasa
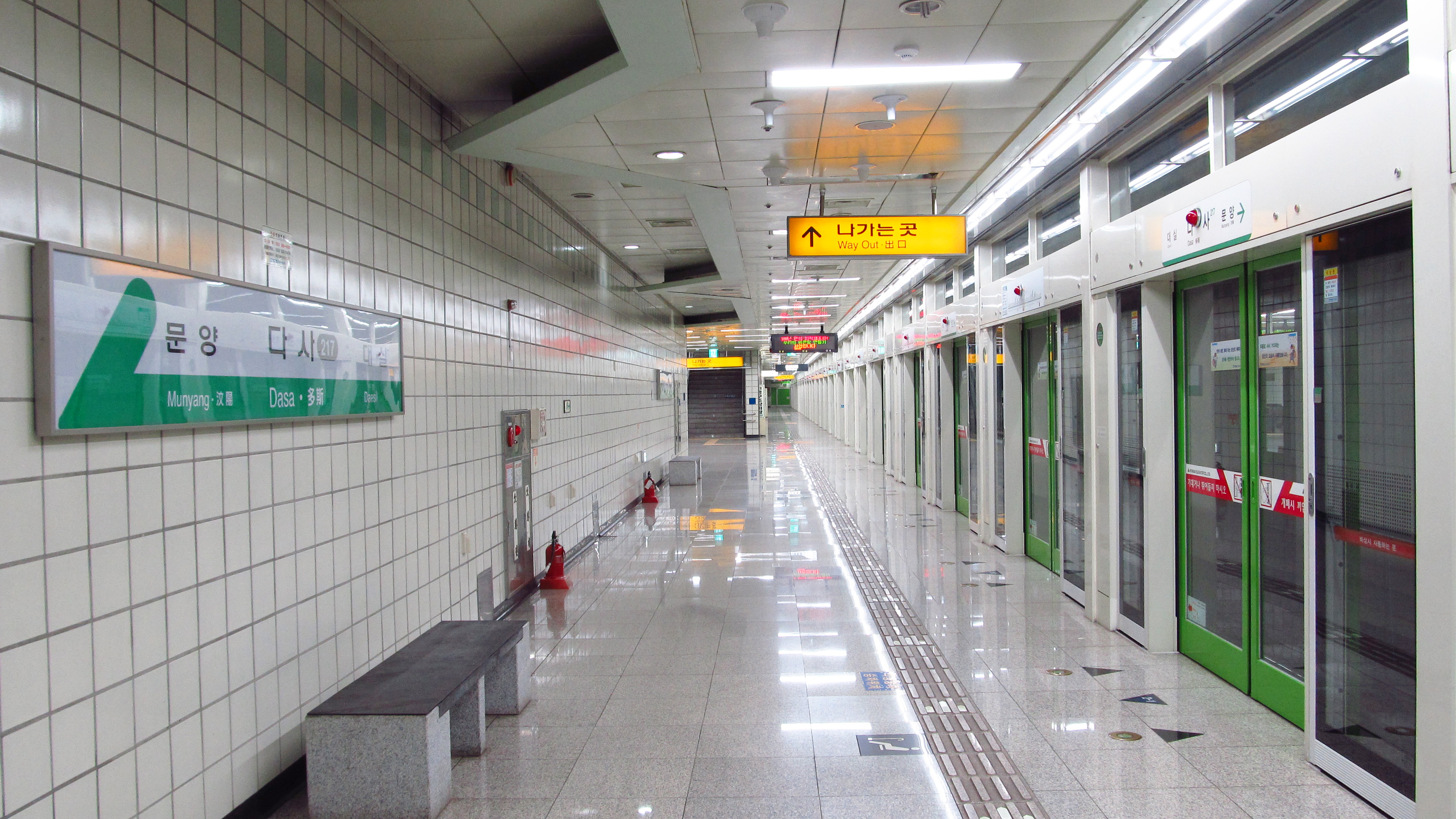
- Station platform

Korean name
- Hangul: 다사역
- Hanja: 多斯驛
- Revised Romanization: Dasayeok
- McCune–Reischauer: Tasayŏk

General information
- Location: Maegok-ri, Dasa-eup, Dalseong, Daegu; South Korea
- Coordinates: 35°51′55″N 128°27′28″E
- Operator: DTRO
- Line: Daegu Metro Line 2
- Platforms: 2
- Tracks: 2
- Connections: Seongseo3

Construction
- Structure type: Underground
- Accessible: yes

Other information
- Station code: 217

History
- Opened: October 18, 2005
Location

Dasa Station (Korean: 다사역; Hanja: 多斯驛; RR: Dasa-yeok) is a station of the Daegu Subway Line 2 in Maegok-ri, Dasa-eup, Dalseong County, Daegu, South Korea. The area surrounding this station is the downtown of the town Dasa-eup. Platform screen doors have been added to the subway platforms.

== Gallery ==
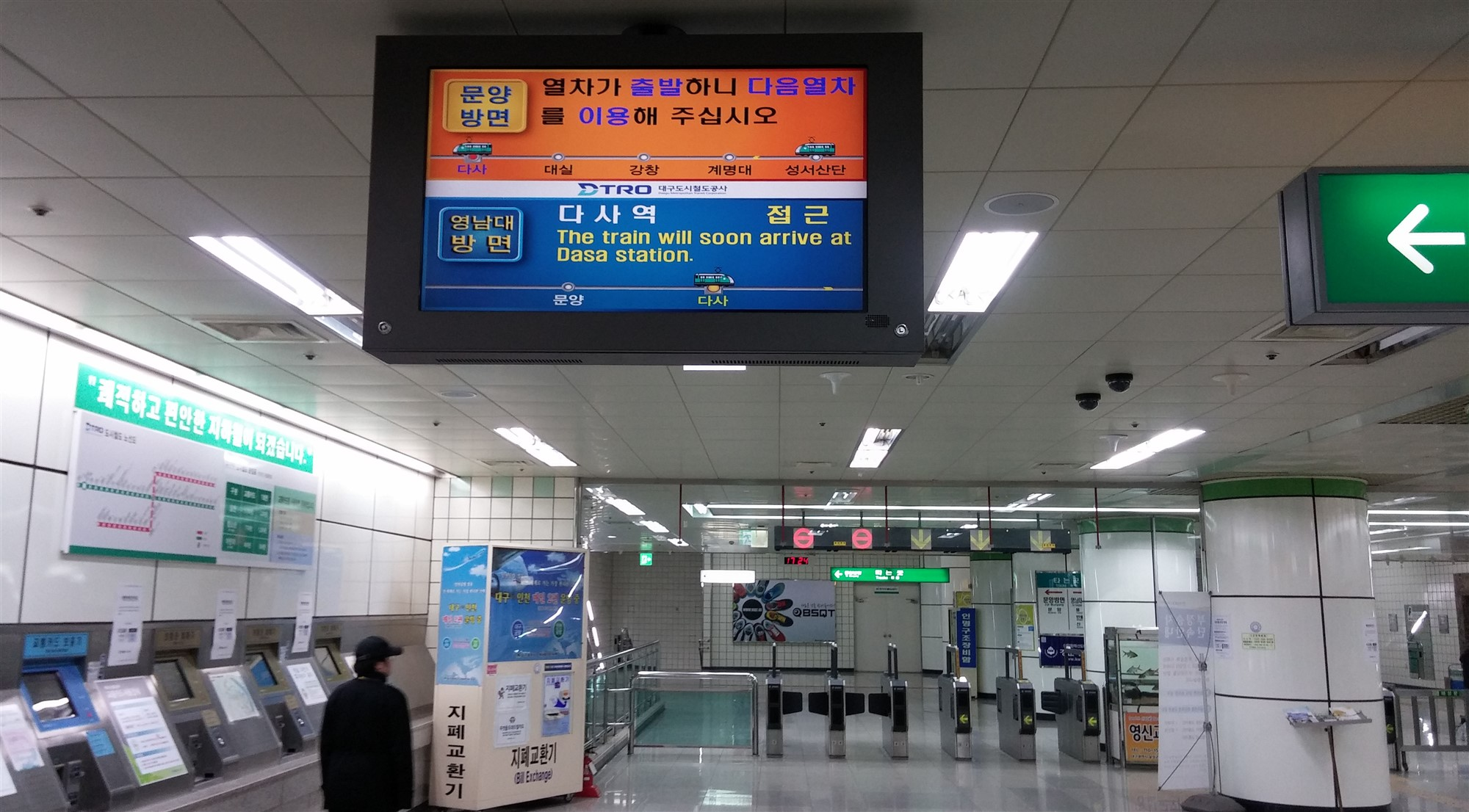
Station interior

== Notable places nearby ==
- Dasa Elementary School
- Dasa-eup Community Center
- Public Health Center of Dasa
- Dasa-eup Office
- Dasa Area Patrol Unit
- Dasa 119 Fire House
- Dasa Middle School
- Dasa High School
- Dasa e-pyunhansesang apt

Preceding station	Daegu Metro	Following station
Munyang Terminus	Line 2	Daesil towards Yeungnam University
