= Suseong-gu Office station =

Station of the Daegu Metro

234 수성구청 (KBS) Suseong-gu Office (KBS)
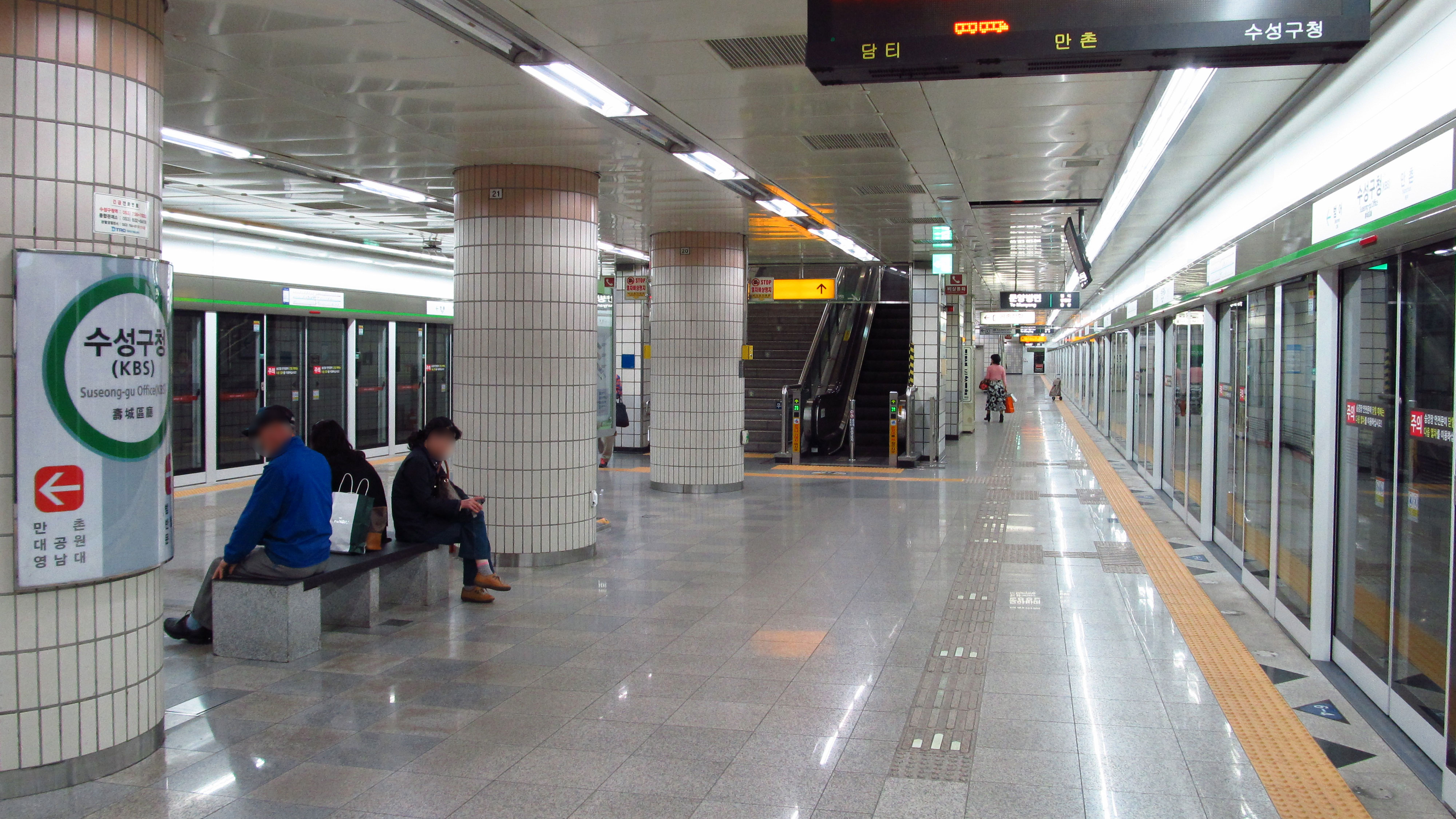
- The platform in October 2016

Korean name
- Hangul: 수성구청역
- Hanja: 壽城區廳驛
- Revised Romanization: Suseong-gucheong-yeok
- McCune–Reischauer: Susŏng-guch'ŏng-yŏk

General information
- Location: Beomeo-dong, Suseong District, Daegu; South Korea
- Coordinates: 35°51′32″N 128°38′08″E
- Operator: DTRO
- Line: Daegu Metro Line 2
- Platforms: 1
- Tracks: 2

Construction
- Structure type: Underground

Other information
- Station code: 234

History
- Opened: October 18, 2005
Location

Suseong-gu Office Station is a station of the Daegu Metro Line 2 in Beomeo-dong, Suseong District, Daegu, South Korea. Suseong District Office is closer to Beomeo Station than Suseong-gu Office Station.

== History ==
October 18, 2005: Opened.

== Vicinity ==
- Exit 1 : Daegu Beomeo 2-dong Post Office, Beomeo Elementary School
- Exit 2 : Suseong-gu office, Suseong Police Station, KBS Daegu Broadcasting Branch Office
- Exit 3 : Beomeo Rodeo Town, Kyungshin High School, Kyungshin Middle School

Preceding station	Daegu Metro	Following station
Beomeo towards Munyang	Line 2	Manchon towards Yeungnam University
