= Sawol station =

Station of the Daegu Metro

241 사월 Sawol
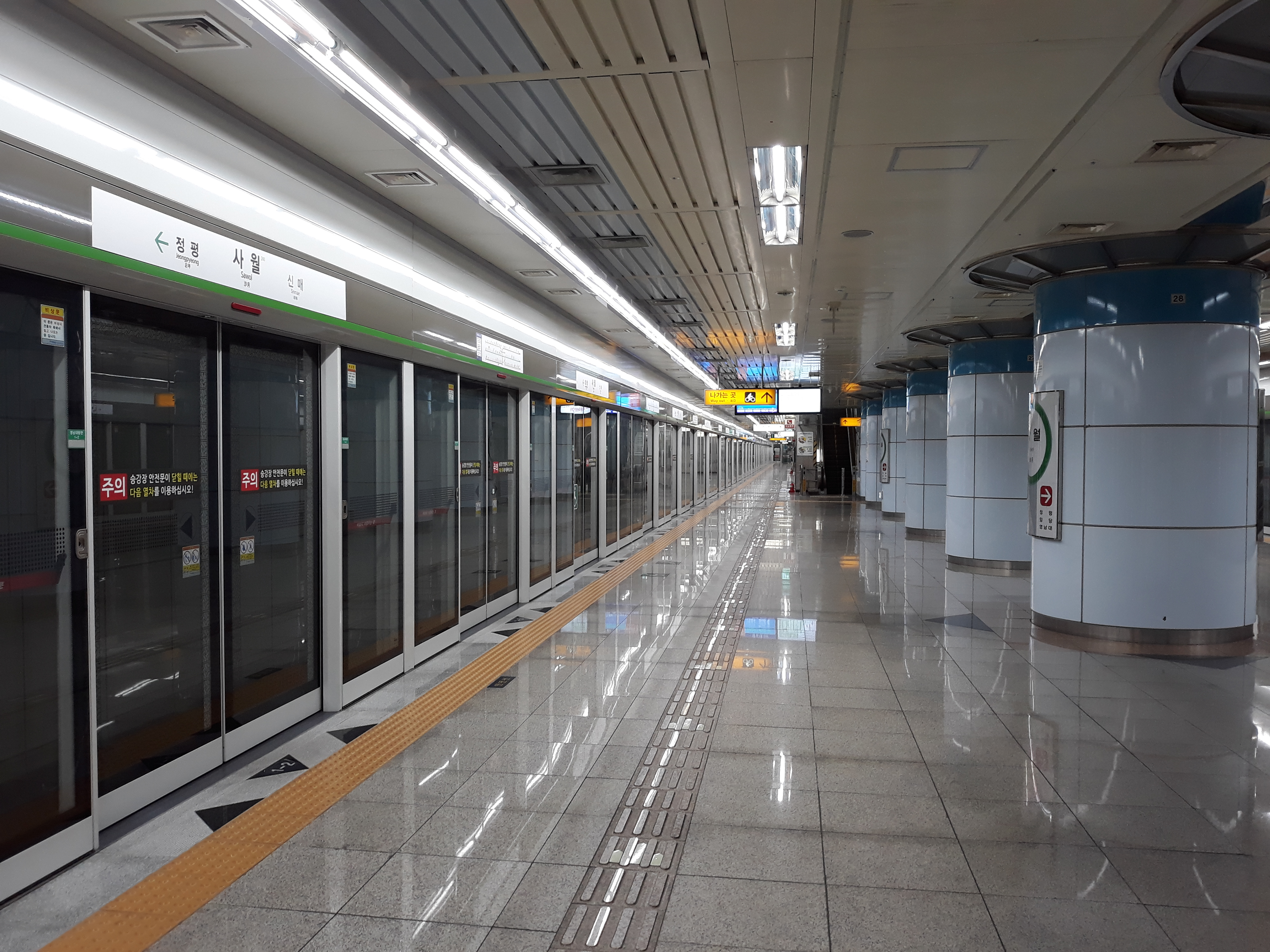
- Station platform

Korean name
- Hangul: 사월역
- Hanja: 沙月驛
- Revised Romanization: Sawollyeok
- McCune–Reischauer: Sawŏllyŏk

General information
- Location: Sinmae-dong, Suseong District, Daegu; South Korea
- Coordinates: 35°50′13″N 128°42′59″E
- Operator: DTRO
- Line: Daegu Metro Line 2
- Platforms: 1
- Tracks: 2

Construction
- Structure type: Underground

Other information
- Station code: 241

History
- Opened: October 18, 2005
Location

Sawol Station (Korean: 사월역; Hanja: 沙月驛; RR: Sawol-yeok) is a station of Daegu Metro Line 2 in Sawol-dong and Sinmae-dong, Suseong District, Daegu, South Korea.

== Gallery ==
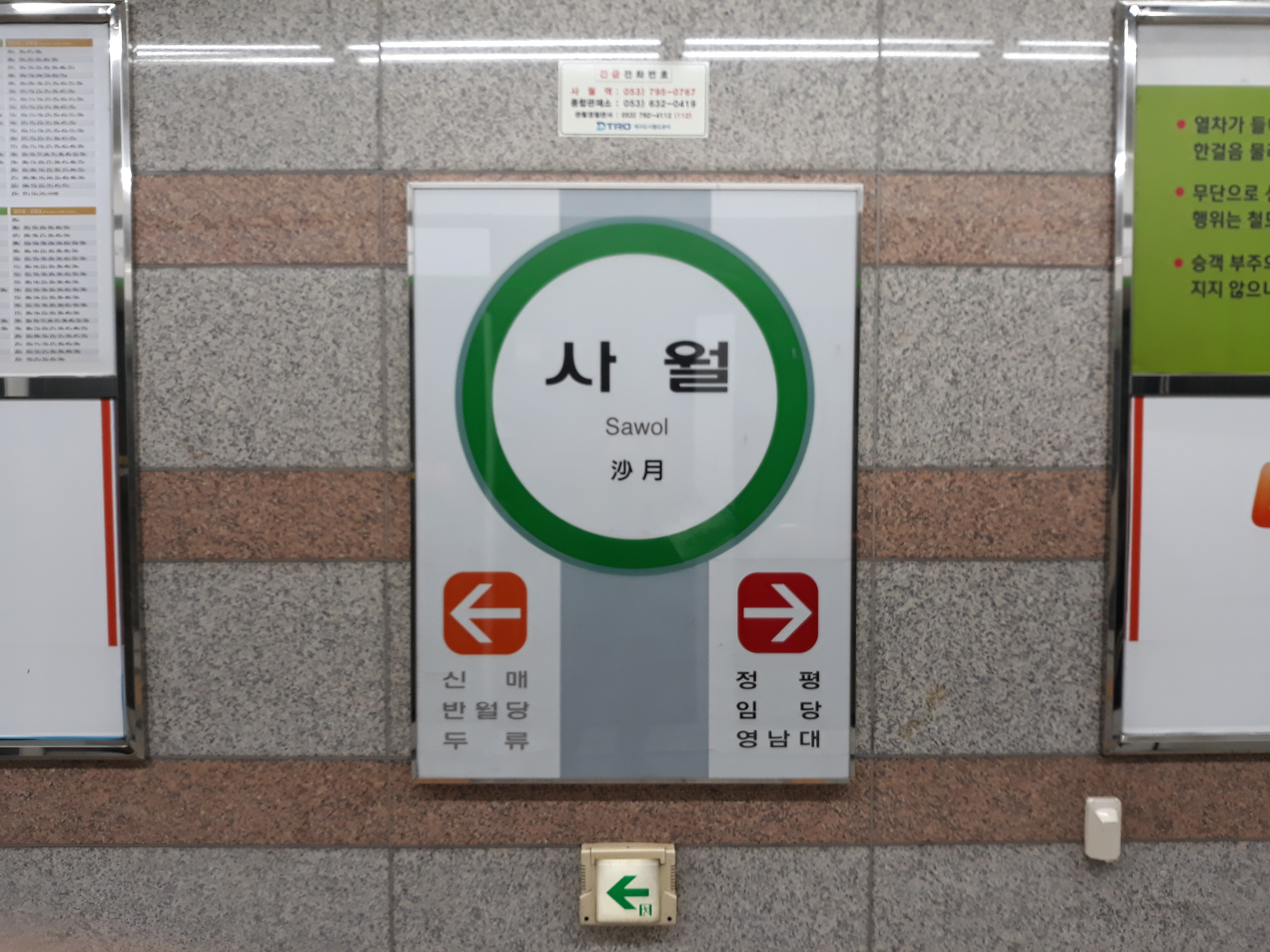
Station name plate

Preceding station	Daegu Metro	Following station
Sinmae towards Munyang	Line 2	Jeongpyeong towards Yeungnam University
