= Kyungpook National University Hospital station =

Station of the Daegu Metro

231 경대병원 (미르치과병원) Kyungpook Nat'l Univ. Hosp. (MIR Dental Hospital)
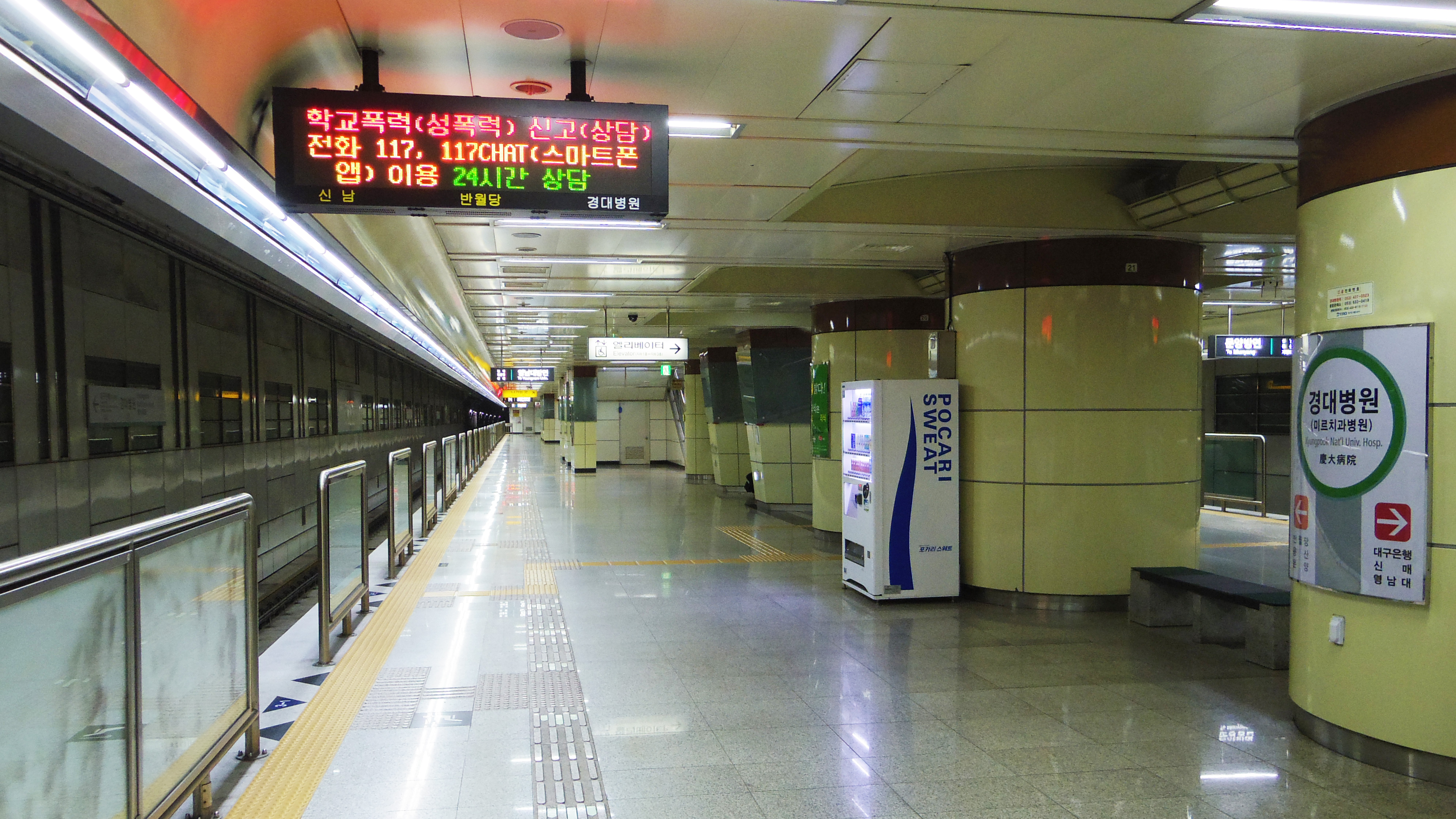

General information
- Location: Samdeok-dong, Jung District, Daegu; South Korea
- Coordinates: 35°51′47″N 128°36′12″E
- Operator: DTRO
- Line: Daegu Metro Line 2
- Platforms: 1
- Tracks: 2

Construction
- Structure type: Underground

Other information
- Station code: 231

History
- Opened: October 18, 2005
Location

Kyungpook National University Hospital station is a station of Daegu Metro Line 2 in Samdeok-dong, Daebong-dong, Jung District, Daegu, South Korea.

== Gallery ==
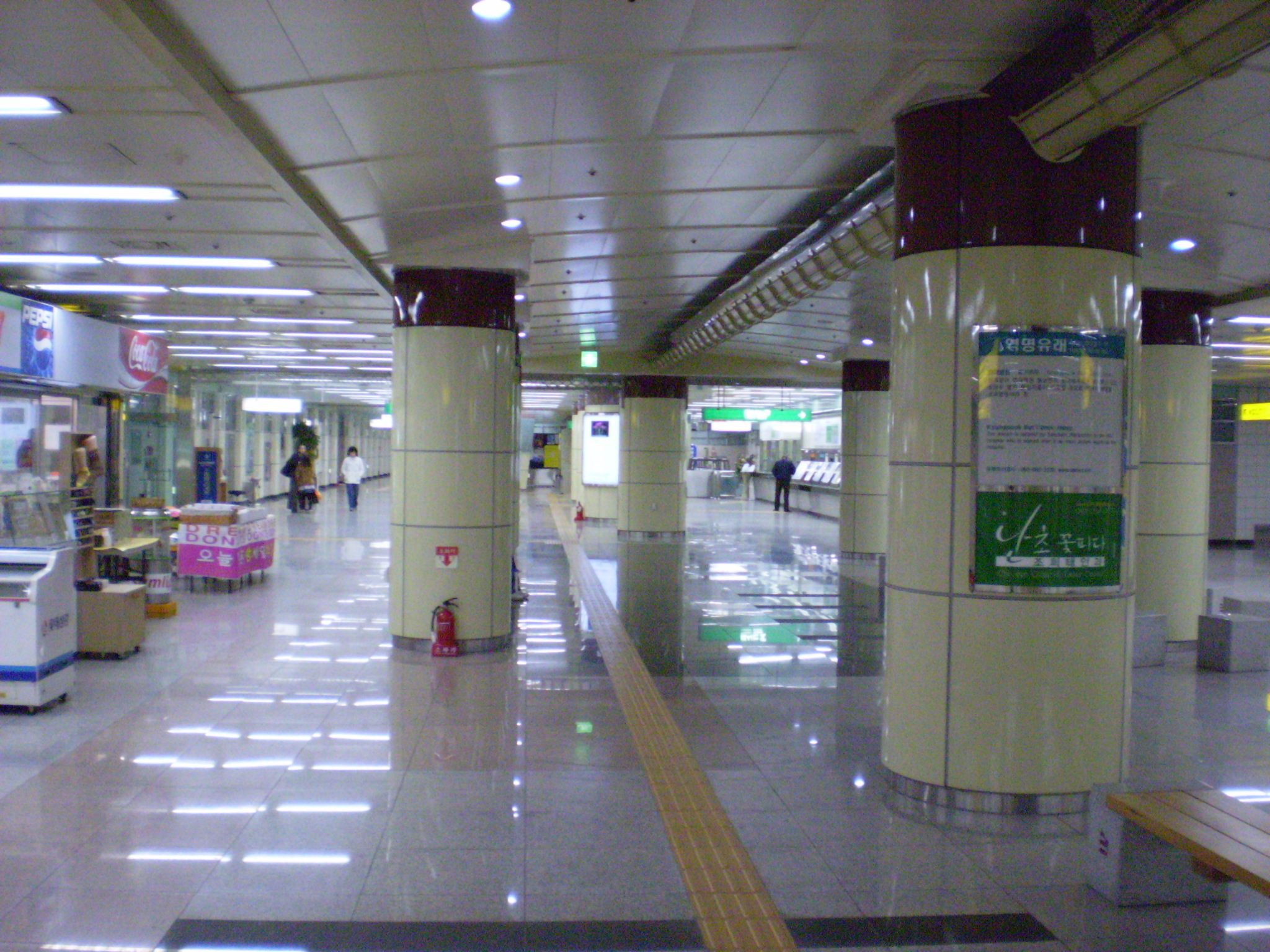
Station concourse

== See also ==
- Kyungpook National University Hospital
- Chilgok Kyungpook National University Medical Center station

Preceding station	Daegu Metro	Following station
Banwoldang towards Munyang	Line 2	Daegu Bank towards Yeungnam University
