= Yeonho station =

Station of the Daegu Metro

237 연호 Yeonho
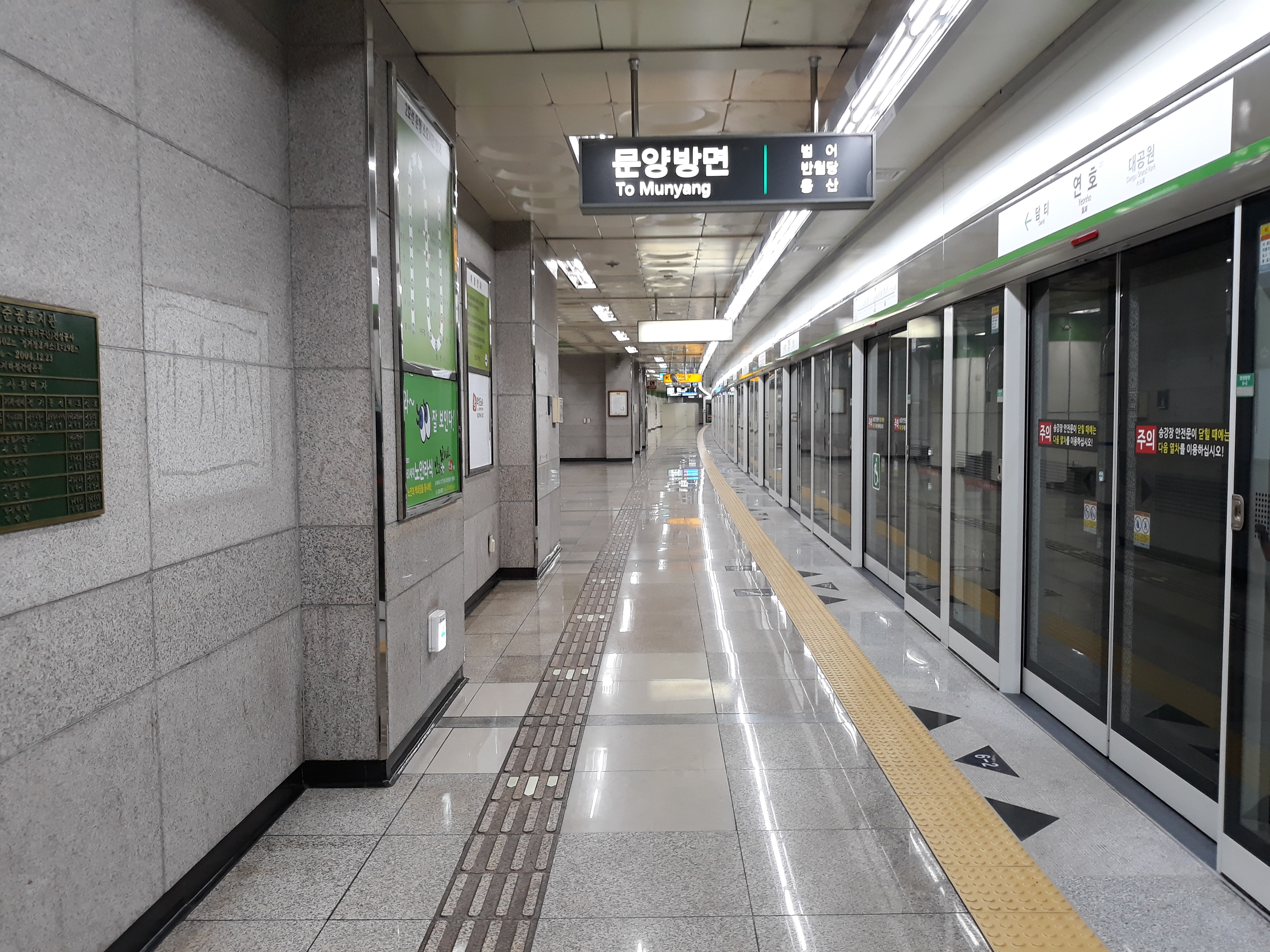
- Station platform

Korean name
- Hangul: 연호역
- Hanja: 連湖驛
- Revised Romanization: Yeonhoyeok
- McCune–Reischauer: Yŏnhoyŏk

General information
- Location: Yeonho-dong, Suseong District, Daegu; South Korea
- Coordinates: 35°50′48″N 128°40′17″E
- Operator: DTRO
- Line: Daegu Metro Line 2
- Platforms: 1
- Tracks: 2

Construction
- Structure type: Underground

Other information
- Station code: 237

History
- Opened: October 18, 2005
Location

Yeonho Station is a station of Daegu Metro Line 2 in Yeonho-dong, Suseong District, Daegu, South Korea.

== History ==
October 18, 2005: Opened.

== See also ==
- Beomanno

Preceding station	Daegu Metro	Following station
Damti towards Munyang	Line 2	Suseong Alpha City towards Yeungnam University
