= Sinmae station =

Station of the Daegu Metro

240 신매 Sinmae
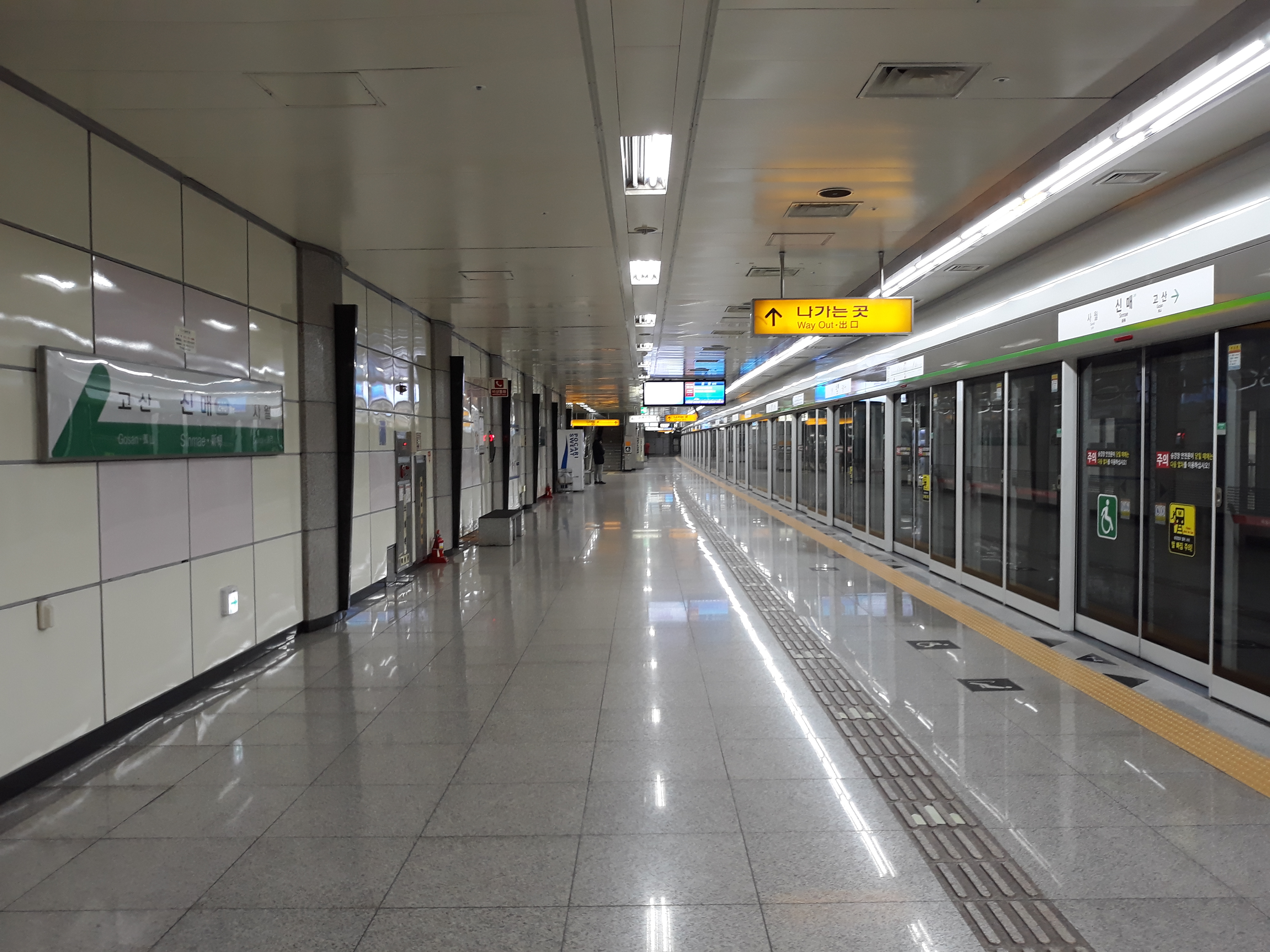
- Station platform

Korean name
- Hangul: 신매역
- Hanja: 新梅驛
- Revised Romanization: Sinmaeyeok
- McCune–Reischauer: Sinmaeyŏk

General information
- Location: Maeho-dong, Suseong District, Daegu; South Korea
- Coordinates: 35°50′27″N 128°42′18″E
- Operator: DTRO
- Line: Daegu Metro Line 2
- Platforms: 2
- Tracks: 2

Construction
- Structure type: Underground

Other information
- Station code: 240

History
- Opened: October 18, 2005
Location

Sinmae Station (Korean: 신매역; Hanja: 新梅驛; RR: Sinmae-yeok) is a station of Daegu Metro Line 2 in Sinmae-dong and Maeho-dong, Suseong District, Daegu, South Korea.

== History ==
October 18, 2005: Opened.

Preceding station	Daegu Metro	Following station
Gosan towards Munyang	Line 2	Sawol towards Yeungnam University
