= Manchon station =

Station of the Daegu Metro

235 만촌 (만촌 더설레임 피부과) Manchon (Manchon The Seolleim Dermatology Clinic)
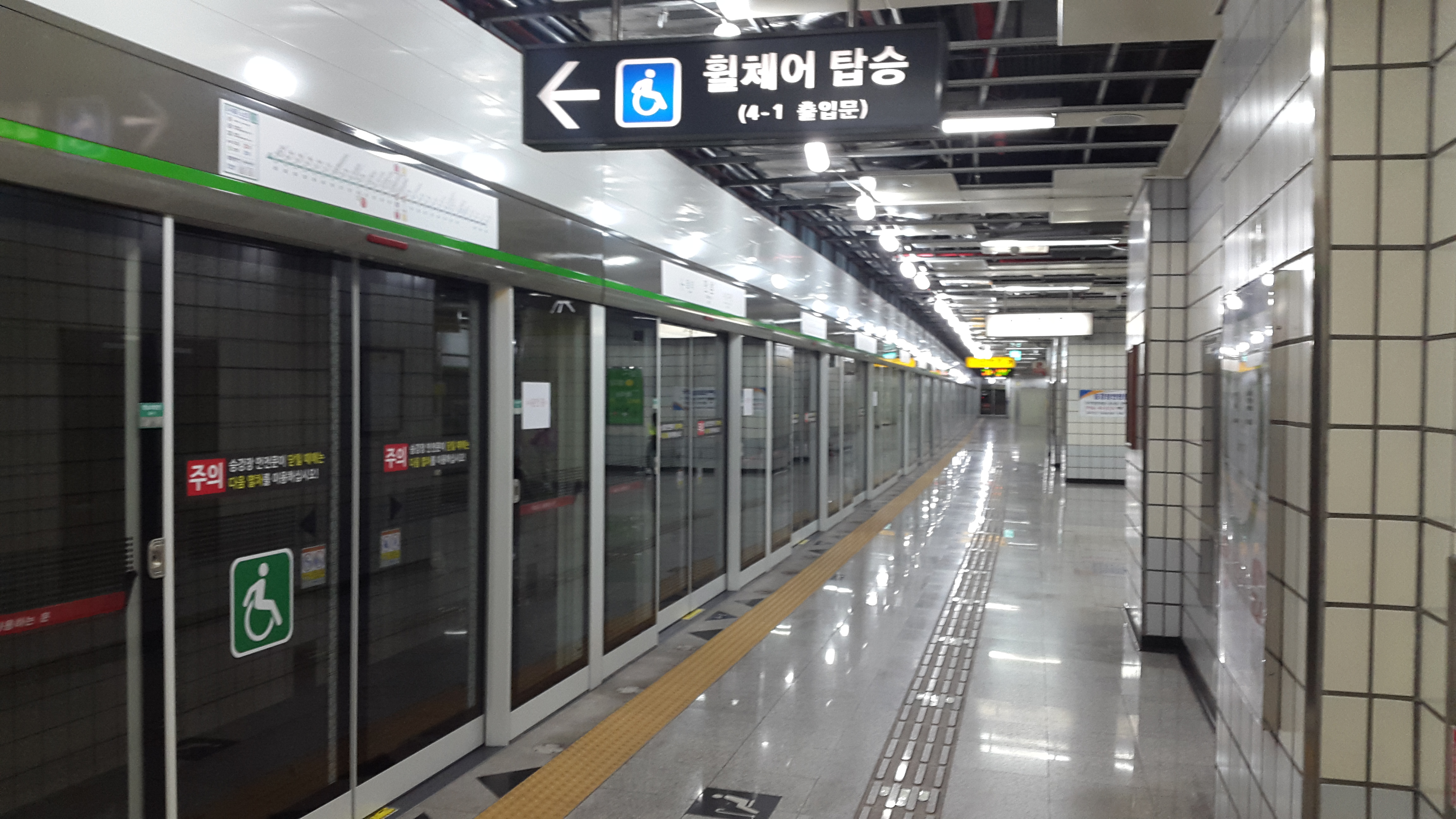
- The platform in September 2016

Korean name
- Hangul: 만촌역
- Hanja: 晩村驛
- Revised Romanization: Manchonnyeok
- McCune–Reischauer: Manch'onnyŏk

General information
- Location: Manchon-dong, Suseong District, Daegu; South Korea
- Coordinates: 35°51′32″N 128°38′41″E
- Operator: DTRO
- Line: Daegu Metro Line 2
- Platforms: 1
- Tracks: 2

Construction
- Structure type: Underground

Other information
- Station code: 235

History
- Opened: October 18, 2005
Location

Manchon Station is a station of Daegu Metro Line 2 in Manchon-dong, Suseong District, Daegu, South Korea.

== History ==
October 18, 2005: Opened.

Preceding station	Daegu Metro	Following station
Suseong-gu Office towards Munyang	Line 2	Damti towards Yeungnam University
