= Imdang station =

Train Station in South Korea

243 임당 Imdang
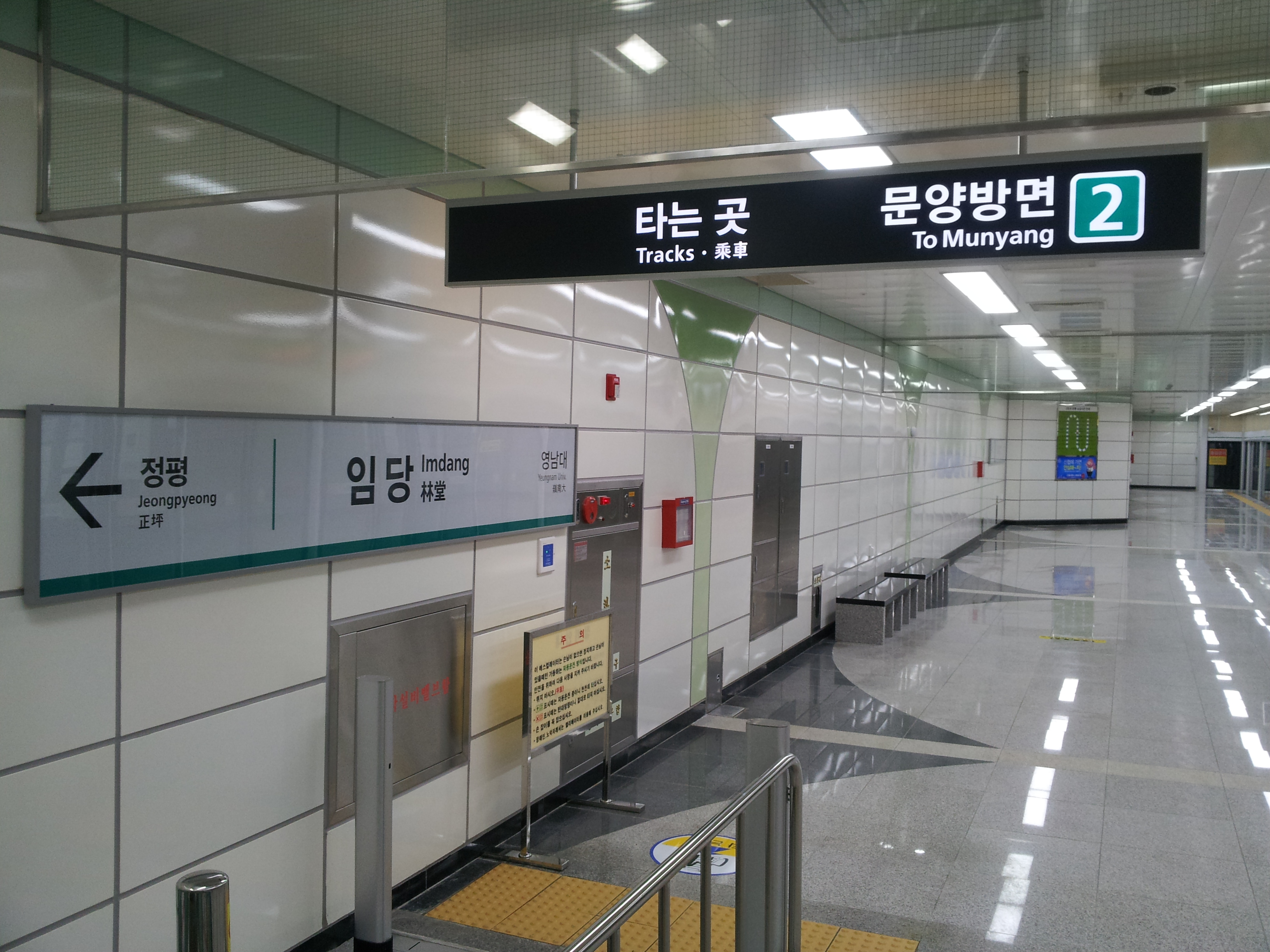
- Station name plate

Korean name
- Hangul: 임당역
- Hanja: 林堂驛
- Revised Romanization: Imdangyeok
- McCune–Reischauer: Imdangyŏk

General information
- Location: Jungbang-dong, Gyeongsan, North Gyeongsang Province; South Korea
- Coordinates: 35°50′02″N 128°44′11″E
- Operator: DTRO
- Line: Daegu Metro Line 2
- Platforms: 2
- Tracks: 2

Construction
- Structure type: Underground

Other information
- Station code: 243

History
- Opened: September 19, 2012
Location

Imdang Station (Korean: 임당역; Hanja: 林堂驛; RR: Imdang-yeok) is a station of Daegu Metro Line 2 in Imdang-dong and Jungbang-dong, Gyeongsan, North Gyeongsang Province, South Korea.

== Gallery ==
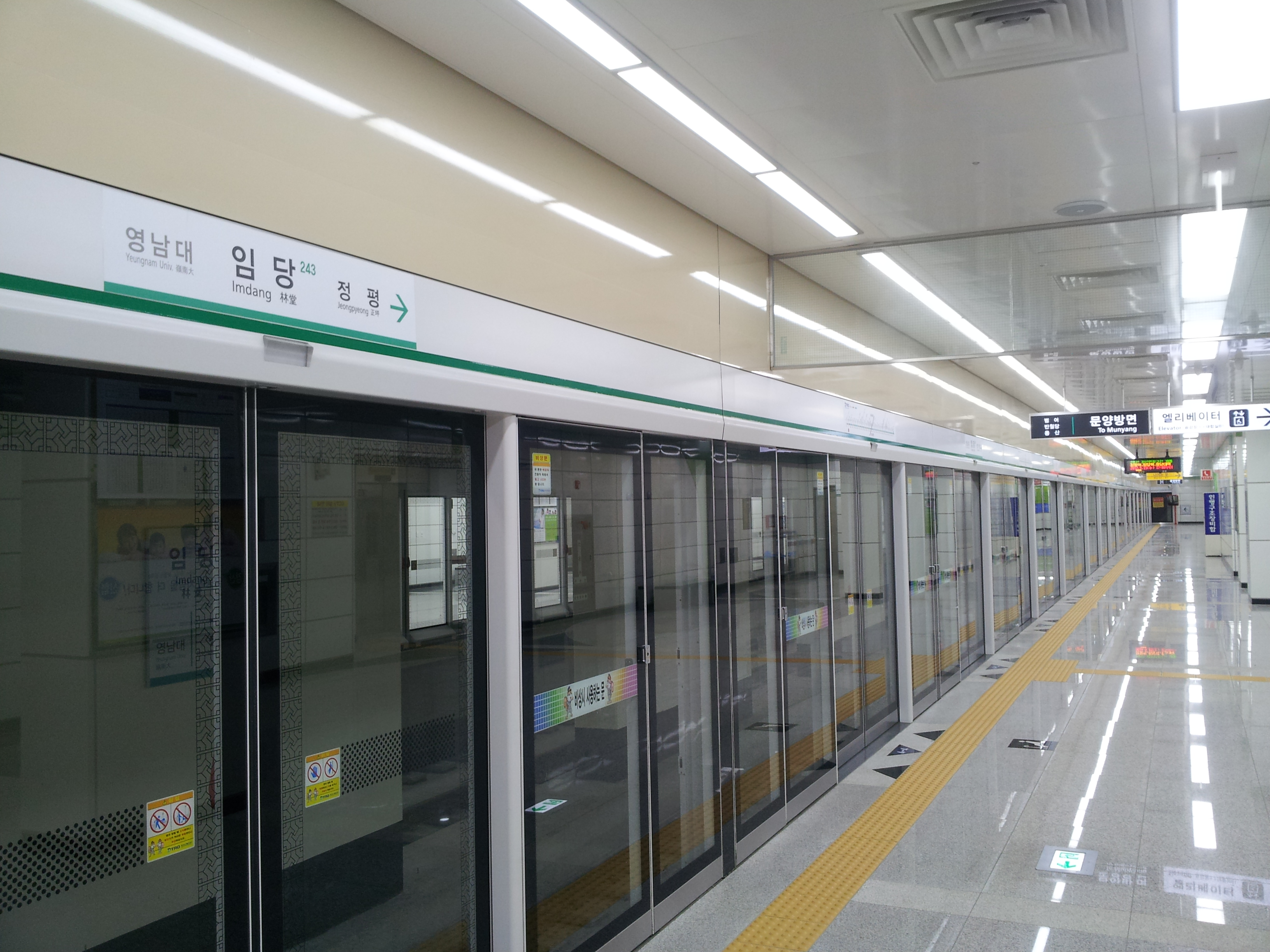
Station platform

Preceding station	Daegu Metro	Following station
Jeongpyeong towards Munyang	Line 2	Yeungnam University Terminus
