= Duryu Park =

Park in Daegu, South Korea

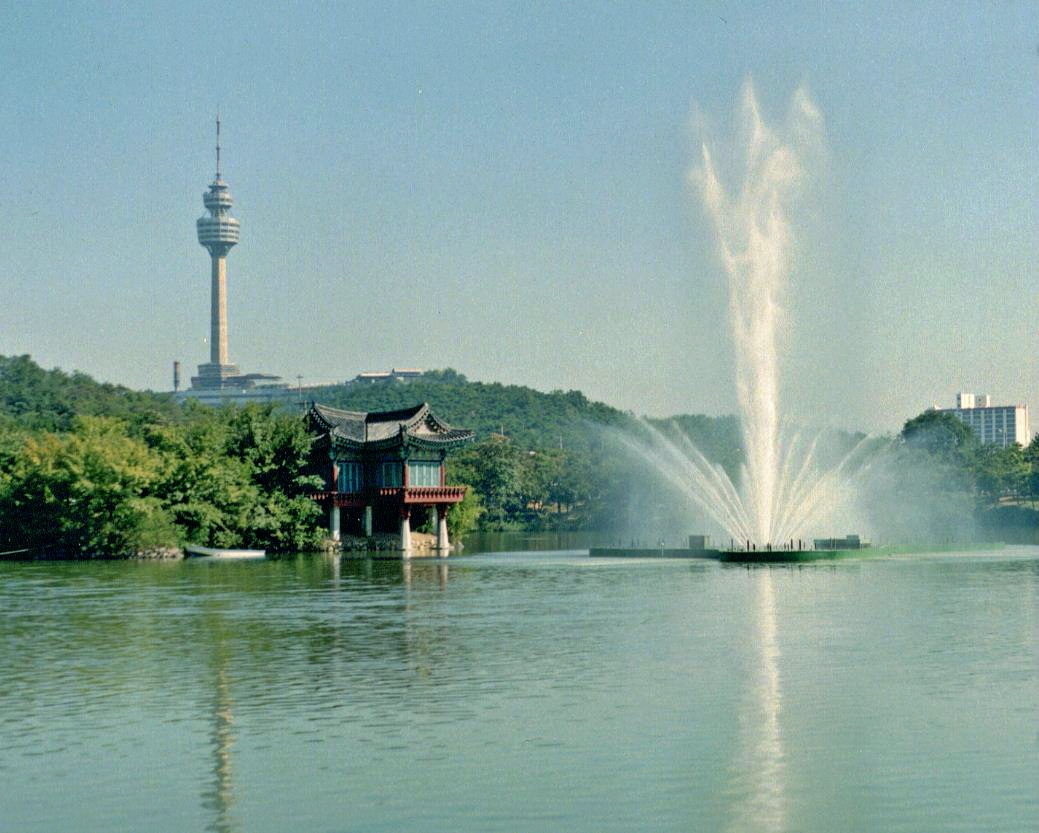
- Fountain and lake in the park (2001)
- Interactive map of Duryu Park
- Coordinates: 35.848°N 128.559°E

Korean name
- Hangul: 두류공원
- Hanja: 頭流公園
- RR: Duryu gongwon
- MR: Turyu kongwŏn

Duryu Park (Korean: 두류공원) is a park located in Duryu-dong, Dalseo District, Daegu, South Korea. It was founded in 1965.

The area of the park is 1,653,965 m^{2}. It is equipped with many facilities such as multipurpose playgrounds, a swimming pool, tennis courts, a roller skating rink, a football field, and a baseball field. There are two small Buddhist temples on the grounds and the Cathedral Pond - Osaek Fountain. The park is popular for its scenic bridge and views during autumn and spring, during which cherry blossoms bloom. Some festivals and concerts are also held on the grounds, such as a body-painting and a flying lantern festival.

There are over 133 species of trees and plants in the park.
