= Daegu Metro Line 2 =

Metro line in Daegu, South Korea

Line 2
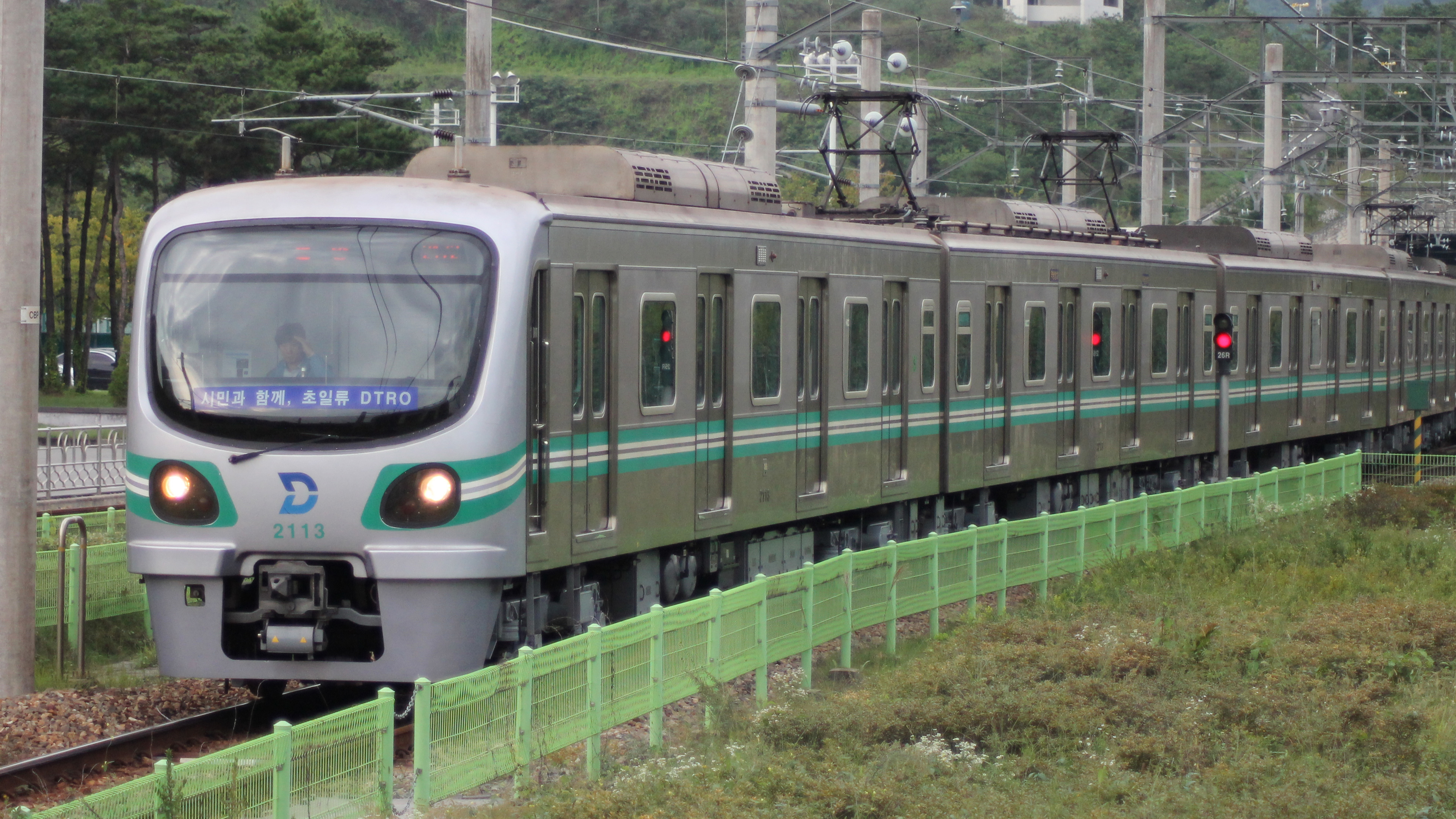

Overview
- Native name: 2호선(2號線); I Hoseon
- Status: Operational
- Termini: Munyang; Yeungnam Univ.
- Stations: 29

Service
- Type: Rapid transit
- System: Daegu Metro
- Services: 1
- Operator(s): Daegu Transit Corporation
- Depot(s): Munyang Depot
- Rolling stock: Hyundai Rotem 2000-series

History
- Opened: 18 October 2005; 20 years ago
- Last extension: 2012

Technical
- Line length: 31.4 km (19.5 mi)
- Number of tracks: 2
- Track gauge: 1,435 mm (4 ft 8 1/2 in)
- Electrification: 1500 V DC overhead
- Operating speed: 80 km/h (50 mph)

Daegu Metro Line 2 is the second rapid transit line in the South Korean city of Daegu. It is operated by the Daegu Transit Corporation.

The line first began running from Munyang to Sawol on 18 October 2005, a distance of 29 km (18 mi). The line had been scheduled to open some years earlier, but fallout from the IMF crisis of the late 1990s caused delays in construction.

On 19 September 2012, the extension from Sawol to Yeongnam University opened.

Daegu Metro Line 2 will be expanded from Munyang Station to Seongju County as compensation of Terminal High Altitude Area Defense Deployment.

== Stations ==
Station Number	Station Name English	Station Name Hangul	Station Name Hanja	Transfer	Distance in km	Total Distance	Location	
216	Munyang	문양	汶陽		---	0.0	Daegu	Dalseong
217	Dasa	다사	多斯		2.9	2.9	Daegu	Dalseong
218	Daesil	대실	대실		1.0	3.9	Daegu	Dalseong
219	Gangchang	강창	江倉		1.4	5.3	Daegu	Dalseo
220	Keimyung Univ.	계명대	啓明大		1.3	6.6	Daegu	Dalseo
221	Seongseo Industrial Complex	성서산업단지	城西産業團地		1.2	7.8	Daegu	Dalseo
222	Igok	이곡	梨谷		0.8	8.6	Daegu	Dalseo
223	Yongsan (Seobu Branch Court–Prosecutor's Office)	용산 (서부법원·검찰청입구)	龍山 (西部法院·檢察廳入口)		1.3	9.9	Daegu	Dalseo
224	Jukjeon	죽전	竹田		0.9	10.8	Daegu	Dalseo
225	Gamsam	감삼	甘三		0.9	11.7	Daegu	Dalseo
226	Duryu	두류	頭流		0.8	12.5	Daegu	Dalseo
227	Naedang	내당	內唐		0.9	13.4	Daegu	Seo
228	Bangogae	반고개	반고개		0.8	14.2	Daegu	Dalseo
229	Cheongnaeondeok	청라언덕	靑蘿언덕	Daegu Metro Line 3	0.9	15.1	Daegu	Jung
230	Banwoldang	반월당	半月堂	Daegu Metro Line 1	1.0	16.1	Daegu	Jung
231	Kyungpook Nat'l Univ. Hospital	경대병원	慶大病院		0.9	17.0	Daegu	Jung
232	Daegu Bank	대구은행	大邱銀行		1.1	18.1	Daegu	Suseong
233	Beomeo	범어	泛漁		1.0	19.1	Daegu	Suseong
234	Suseong-gu Office	수성구청	壽城區廳		0.9	20.0	Daegu	Suseong
235	Manchon	만촌	晩村		0.9	20.9	Daegu	Suseong
236	Damti (Suseong College–Daeryun Middle & High School)	담티 (수성대·대륜)	담티 (壽城大·大倫)		0.9	21.8	Daegu	Suseong
237	Yeonho	연호	蓮湖		1.8	23.6	Daegu	Suseong
238	Suseong Alpha City	수성알파시티	壽城알파시티		1.0	24.6	Daegu	Suseong
239	Gosan	고산	孤山		1.2	25.8	Daegu	Suseong
240	Sinmae	신매	新梅		1.1	26.9	Daegu	Suseong
241	Sawol	사월	沙月		1.1	28.0	Daegu	Suseong
242	Jeongpyeong	정평	正坪		1.1	29.1	North Gyeongsang	Gyeongsan
243	Imdang	임당	臨堂		1.2	30.3	North Gyeongsang	Gyeongsan
244	Yeungnam Univ.	영남대	嶺南大		1.1	31.4	North Gyeongsang	Gyeongsan

== See also ==
- Daegu Metro Line 1
- Transport in South Korea
- Daegu Metro Line 3
