= Duryu-dong =

Neighborhood of Daegu, South Korea

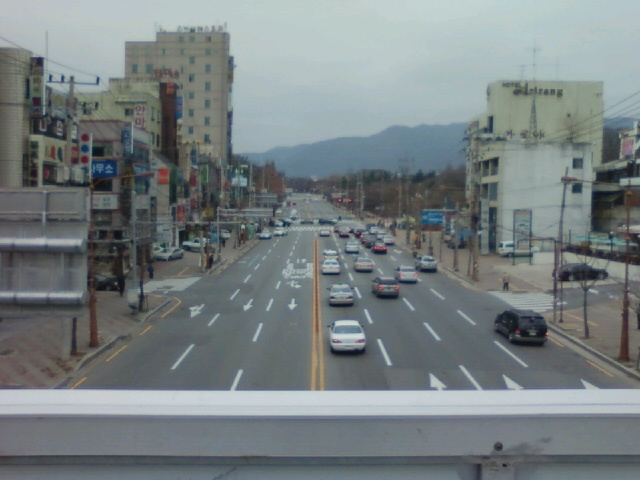
- The view of Duryu-dong

Korean name
- Hangul: 두류동
- Hanja: 頭流洞
- RR: Duryu-dong
- MR: Turyu-dong

Duryu-dong (Korean: 두류동) is a dong (neighborhood) in Dalseo District, Daegu, South Korea. It is the site of Duryu Park and E-World (Woobang Tower Land), a popular Daegu amusement park. Although legally a single dong, Duryu-dong is divided into three administrative dong: Duryu-1[il]-, -2[i]-, and -3[sam]-dong. Together, the three administrative dong cover 2.44 km^{2}. They were home to 34,280 people as of October 31, 2005.

The region's name comes from Duryu-san, the hill on which 83 Tower (Woobang Tower) is situated. It is a hanja transcription of a dialect term meaning "round", referring to the hill's rounded shape.

Daegu Subway Line 2 passes through Duryu-dong, as does the Dalgubeol Expressway. A large number of clinics and hospitals are located in the area.

== See also ==
- Subdivisions of South Korea
- Geography of South Korea
