= Dasa-eup =

Dasa
- Town
- Coordinates: 35°52′19.92″N 128°27′56.3″E
- Country: South Korea
- Province: Daegu
- County: Dalseong County
- Town Office: Maegok-ri
- Administrative divisions: 1 chuljangso, 11 beopjeongni, 46 hangjeongni and 551 ban

Area
  - Total: 36.66 km^{2} (14.15 sq mi)

Population (2012.12)
  - Total: 62,189
  - Density: 1,696/km^{2} (4,394/sq mi)
- Website: Dasa Town

Korean name
- Hangul: 다사읍
- Hanja: 多斯邑
- RR: Dasa-eup
- MR: Tasa-ŭp

Dasa-eup (Korean: 다사읍) is a town, or eup in Dalseong County, Daegu, South Korea. The township Dasa-myeon was upgraded to the town Dasa-eup in 1997. Dasa Town Office are located in Maegok-ri. Jukgok-ri which include Jukgok Residential Area is crowded with people.

== Communities ==
Dasa-eup is divided into 11 villages (ri).

	Hangul	Hanja
Icheon-ri	이천리	伊川里
Dalcheon-ri	달천리	達川里
Bakgok-ri	박곡리	朴谷里
Bangcheon-ri	방천리	坊川里
Seojae-ri	서재리	鋤齋里
Secheon-ri	세천리	世川里
Jukgok-ri	죽곡리	竹谷里
Maegok-ri	매곡리	梅谷里
Bugok-ri	부곡리	釜谷里
Munyang-ri	문양리	汶陽里
Munsan-ri	문산리	汶山里
