= Munyang station =

Station of the Daegu Metro

216 문양 Munyang

Korean name
- Hangul: 문양역
- Hanja: 汶陽驛
- Revised Romanization: Munyangyeok
- McCune–Reischauer: Munyangyŏk

General information
- Location: Munyang-ri, Dasa-eup, Dalseong County, Daegu; South Korea
- Coordinates: 35°51′51″N 128°26′13″E
- Operator: DTRO
- Line: Line 2
- Platforms: 1
- Tracks: 2

Construction
- Structure type: Underground
- Parking: Yes
- Accessible: Yes

Other information
- Station code: 216

History
- Opened: October 18, 2005

Services
| Preceding station | Daegu Metro | Following station |
|---|---|---|
| Terminus | Line 2 | Dasa towards Yeungnam University |
Location

Munyang Station (Korean: 문양역; Hanja: 汶陽驛; RR: Munyang-yeok) is a station of Daegu Metro Line 2 in Munyang-ri, Dasa-eup, Dalseong County, Daegu, South Korea. The station is located near at the Munyang Depot.

== Munyang Depot ==
On the north side of the station are the outdoor storage yard and maintenance depot for Line 2 trains.

== Station layout ==
| G | Street Level |
| L1 | Concourse | Faregates, Ticketing Machines, Station Control |
| L2; Platforms | Island platform, doors will open on the right |
| L2; Platforms | Southbound | Line 2 toward Yeungnam Univ. (Dasa)→ |
| L2; Platforms | Northbound | → Line 2 toward Yeungnam Univ. (Dasa) → |
| L2; Platforms | Island platform, doors will open on the right |

== Gallery ==
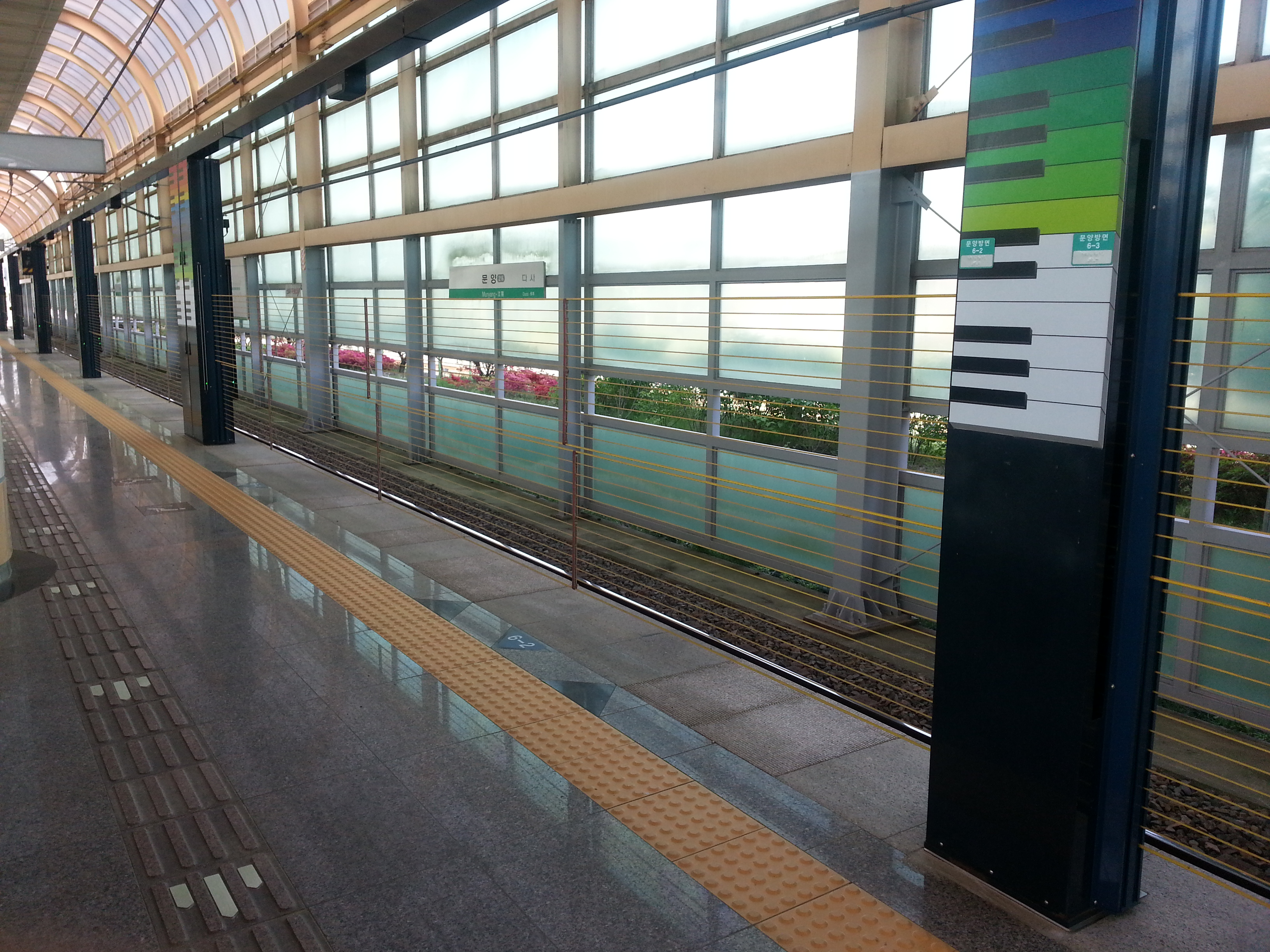
A former Rope Screen Door in Munyang station, Daegu, South Korea
