= Yeungnam University station =

Station of the Daegu Metro

244 영남대 Yeungnam Univ.
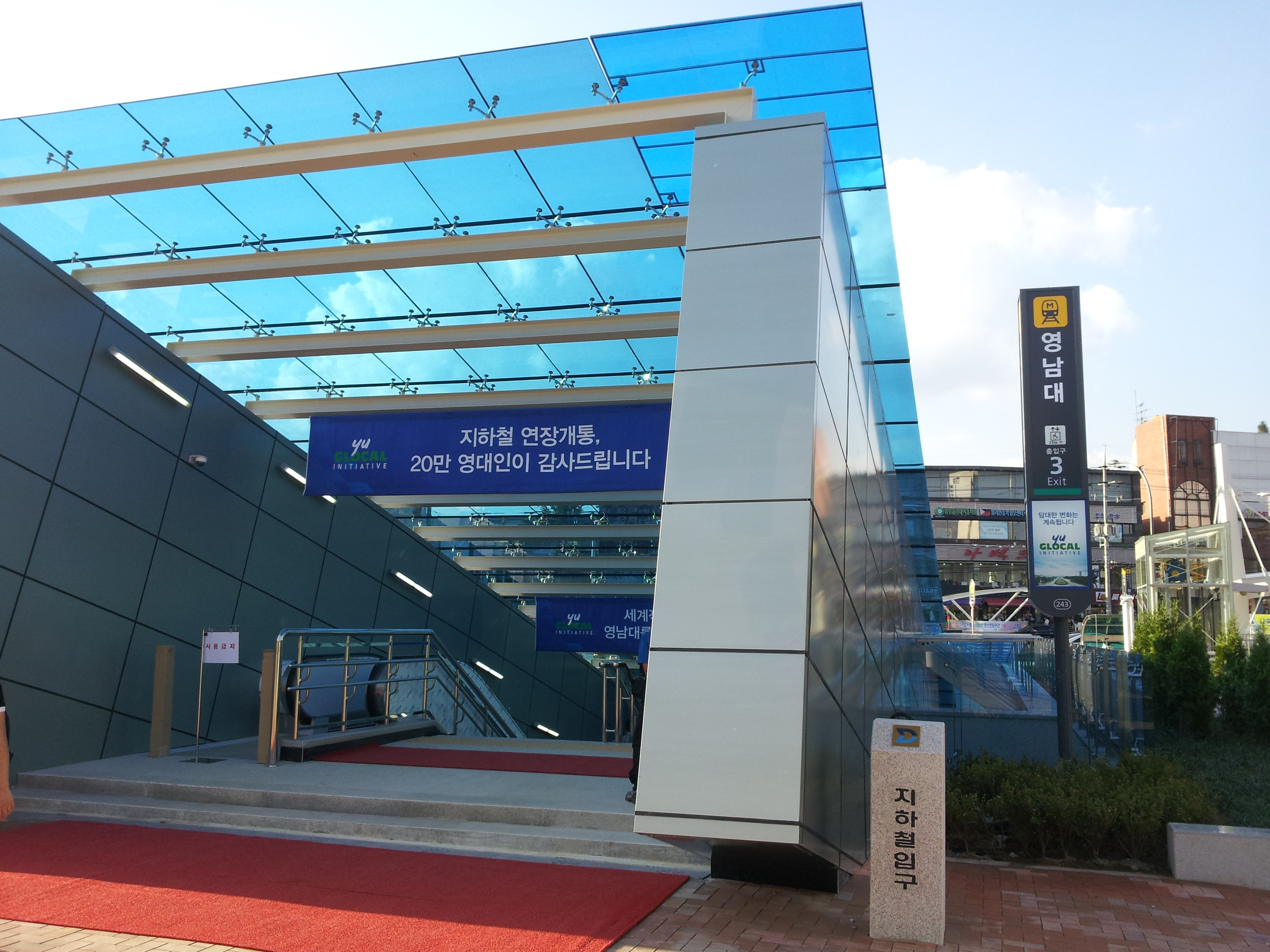
- Exit 3

Korean name
- Hangul: 영남대역
- Hanja: 嶺南大驛
- Revised Romanization: Yeongnamdaeyeok
- McCune–Reischauer: Yŏngnamdaeyŏk

General information
- Location: Dae-dong, Gyeongsan, North Gyeongsang Province; South Korea
- Coordinates: 35°50′09″N 128°45′13″E
- Operator: DTRO
- Line: Daegu Metro Line 2
- Platforms: 2
- Tracks: 2

Construction
- Structure type: Underground

Other information
- Station code: 244

History
- Opened: September 19, 2012
Location

Yeungnam University Station (Korean: 영남대역; Hanja: 嶺南大驛; RR: Yeungnamdae-yeok) is a station of Daegu Metro Line 2 in Dae-dong, Gyeongsan, North Gyeongsang Province, South Korea.

== Gallery ==
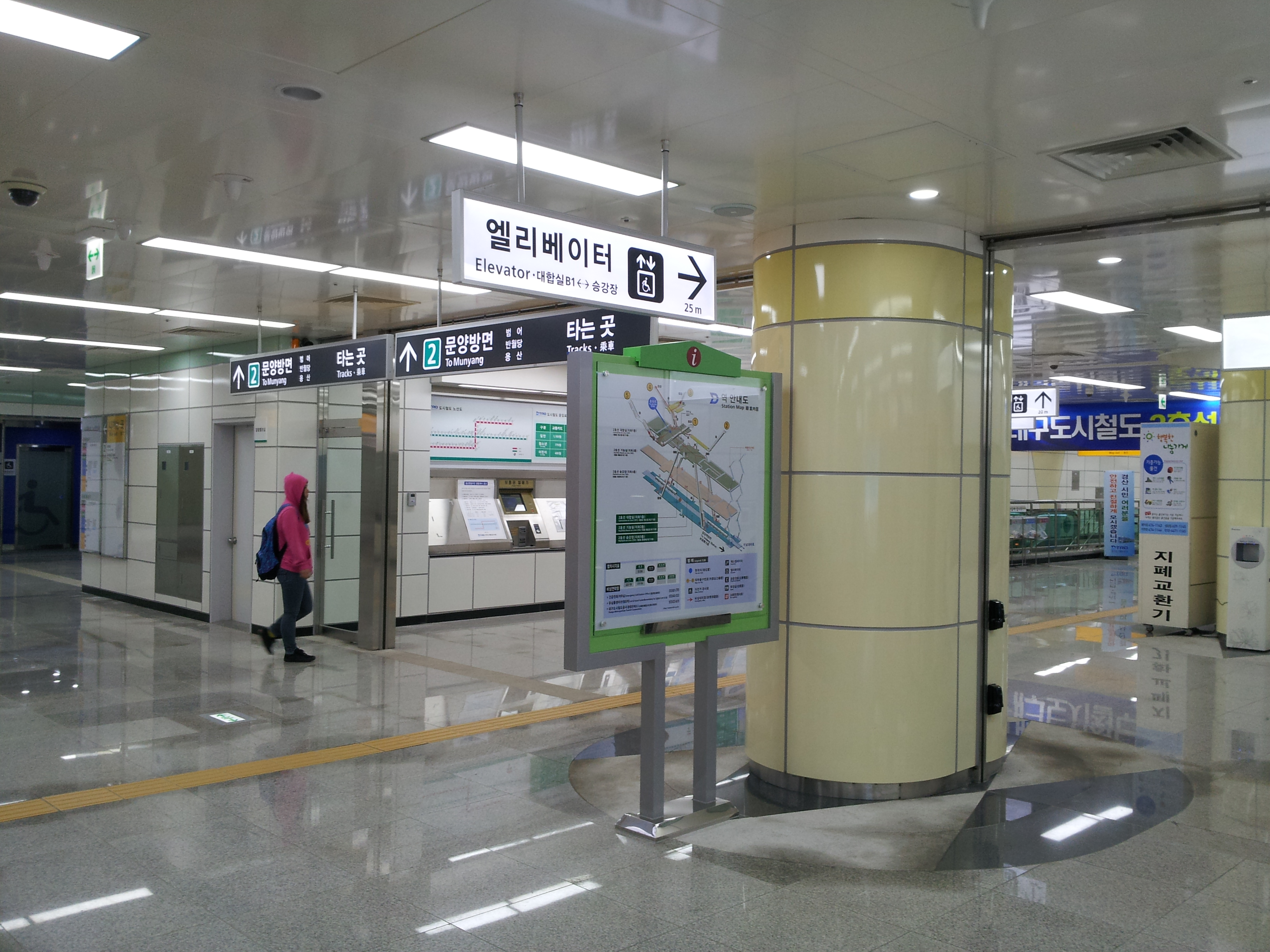
Station concourse

== See also ==
- Yeungnam University

Preceding station	Daegu Metro	Following station
Imdang towards Munyang	Line 2	Terminus
