= Cheongha =

Cheongha or Chungha may refer to:

- Chungha (singer), whose name is rendered as Cheong-ha in revised romanization of Korean
- Cheongha-myeon, an administrative township division in Buk-gu, Pohang
- Cheongha Bridge, a bridge on National Route 29 (South Korea) in North Jeolla Province
- Several intersections and interchanges in the South Korean highway system:
  - Two intersections of National Route 7 (South Korea) near Cheongha-myeon
  - An under construction interchange of the Donghae Expressway with National Route 7
  - An intersection of National Route 43 (South Korea) in Gangwon Province
- Cheongha, a brand of Cheongju from the South Korean company Lotte Chilsung
