= List of earthquakes in South Korea =

This is list of earthquakes in South Korea. Earthquakes in South Korea are less frequent than in neighboring countries, such as China and Japan.

Since 1978, an average of 26 earthquakes have been recorded in and around the vicinity of the Korean Peninsula each year. Most of these earthquakes are minor and barely noticeable, while only about 9 per year have a magnitude of 3.0 or higher.

== Earthquakes ==
Significant earthquakes have occurred in what is now South Korea prior to the 20th century.

- 779 Gyeongju earthquake: approx. M_{w} 6.7–7.0, Speculated max. intensity IX. More than 100 people died and many houses collapsed. This is the deadliest recorded earthquake in South Korea.
- 1518 Seoul earthquake: approx. M_{w} 6.7, Speculated max. intensity IX.
- 1643 Ulsan earthquake: approx. M_{w} 6.7–7.4, Speculated max. intensity IX–X. Tsunami occurred.
- 1681 Yangyang earthquake: approx. M_{w} 7.5, Speculated max. intensity IX. Tsunami occurred. Most powerful earthquake in recorded South Korean history.

Map of earthquakes from 1978 (map data)

Magnitude of earthquakes on the Korean Peninsula since 1978

== 1975 and later ==
This is a part of list of earthquakes in South Korea equal or stronger than 5.0 M_{L} since 1975.

Name	Date and time(KST)	Date and time(UTC)	M_{L}	Deaths	Injuries	Coordinate	Location
	1975-06-29 19:37:41	1975-06-29 10:37:41	M_{w} 7.1			38.759°N 129.990°E	offshore Sokcho, Gangwon
1978 Sangju earthquake	1978-09-16 02:07:06	1978-09-15 17:07:06	5.2			36.60°N 127.9°E	Sangju, North Gyeongsang
1978 Hongseong earthquake	1978-10-07 18:19:52	1978-10-07 09:19:52	5.0			36.60°N 126.7°E	Hongseong County, South Chungcheong
2003 Ongjin earthquake	2003-03-30 20:10:53	2003-03-30 11:10:53	5.0			37.80°N 123.7°E	Ongjin County, Incheon
2004 Uljin earthquake	2004-05-29 19:14:24	2004-05-29 10:14:24	5.2			36.80°N 130.2°E	Uljin County, North Gyeongsang
2014 Taean earthquake	2014-04-01 04:48:35	2014-03-31 19:48:35	5.1			36.95°N 124.5°E	Taean County, South Chungcheong
2016 Ulsan earthquake	2016-07-05 20:33:03	2016-07-05 11:33:03	5.0			35.51°N 129.99°E	Dong District, Ulsan
2016 Gyeongju earthquake	2016-09-12 20:32:54	2016-09-12 11:32:54	5.8 (5.4M_{w})		8	35.77°N 129.18°E	Gyeongju, North Gyeongsang
2017 Pohang earthquake	2017-11-15 14:29:32	2017-11-15 05:29:32	5.4 (5.4M_{w})		82	36.065°N 129.269°E	Buk-gu, Pohang, North Gyeongsang
