= Local Route 20 (South Korea) =

Road in South Korea

State-Funded Local Highway 20
- 국가지원지방도 제20호선
- Pohang-Yeongdeok Line 포항 ~ 영덕선

Route information
- Length: 67.6 km (42.0 mi)
- Existed: 25 August 2001–present

Major junctions
- South end: Nam District, Pohang, North Gyeongsang
- North end: Chuksan-myeon, Yeongdeok County, North Gyeongsang

Location
- Country: South Korea

Highway system
- Highway systems of South Korea; Expressways; National; Local

Local Route 20 Pohang–Yeongdeok Line (Korean: 국가지원지방도 제20호선 포항 ~ 영덕선) is a local route of South Korea that connecting Pohang to Yeongdeok County, North Gyeongsang Province.

== History ==
In 1994, the route was planned as a part of an extension of National Route 20 from Gyeongju to Pohang, but due to a lack of funding, this never happened and instead was designated as a local route on 25 August 2001.

== Stopovers ==
North Gyeongsang Province

- Pohang (Nam District, Buk District) - Yeongdeok County

== Major intersections ==
- (■): Motorway

IS: Intersection, IC: Interchange

=== North Gyeongsang Province ===
Name	Hangul name	Connection	Location		Note
Jangheung-dong IS	장흥동사거리	National Route 20 (Daesong-ro) (Cheolkang-ro)	Pohang City	Nam District	Terminus
Hwajin Bridge	화진교		Pohang City	Nam District	
Hwajin Bridge			Pohang City	Nam District Yeonil-eup	
Taekjeon IS	택전삼거리	Wonseo-gil	Pohang City	Nam District Yeonil-eup	
(South Yeonil Bridge)	(연일대교 남단)	Hyeongsangangnam-ro	Pohang City	Nam District Yeonil-eup	
Yeonil Bridge	연일대교		Pohang City	Nam District Yeonil-eup	
Yeonil Bridge			Pohang City	Nam District	
(North Yeonil Bridge)	(연일대교 북단)	Yeonil-ro; Hyeongsangangbuk-ro	Pohang City	Nam District	
No name	(이름 없음)	Seoman-ro	Pohang City	Nam District	
Hyeongsan IS	형산 교차로	POSCO-daero; Huimang-daero; Donghaean-ro; Jungang-ro	Pohang City	Nam District	
No name	(이름 없음)	Haedong-ro	Pohang City	Nam District	
Haedo Bridge	해도교	Unha-ro	Pohang City	Nam District	
Pohang Songdo Beach	포항송도해수욕장	Songdo-ro	Pohang City	Nam District	
No name	(이름 없음)	Seodong-ro	Pohang City	Nam District	
Pohang Port	포항구항		Pohang City	Nam District	
(Bridge)	(교량)		Pohang City	Nam District	Under construction
(Bridge)			Pohang City	Buk District	Under construction
Hanggu-dong	항구동	Samho-ro	Pohang City	Buk District	
Duho-dong Community Center	두호동주민센터		Pohang City	Buk District	
Yeongildae Beach	영일대해수욕장	Haean-ro	Pohang City	Buk District	
Pohang Dongbu Elementary School	포항동부초등학교		Pohang City	Buk District	
Yeongildae Observation deck	영일대전망대	Samheung-ro; Haean-ro	Pohang City	Buk District	
Sunrise Park IS	해맞이공원사거리	Hwanho-ro; Haemajigongwon-gil	Pohang City	Buk District	
Hwanyeo-dong Community Center Hwanho Girls' Middle School Pohang Youth Center	환여동주민센터 환호여자중학교 포항시청소년수련관		Pohang City	Buk District	
Yangdeok IS	양덕사거리	Saecheonnyeon-daero; Cheonma-ro	Pohang City	Buk District	
Yeongdeok Garage	양덕차고지		Pohang City	Buk District	
Pohang University	포항대학교 교차로	Sindeok-ro	Pohang City	Buk District	
Jukcheon Bridge	죽천교	Haean-ro	Pohang City	Buk District	
Jukcheon Bridge		Haean-ro	Pohang City	Buk District Heunghae-eup	
Jukcheon 2 IS	죽천2 교차로	Jukcheon-gil	Pohang City	Buk District Heunghae-eup	
Jukcheon 1 IS	죽천1 교차로	Yeongilmansandan-ro	Pohang City	Buk District Heunghae-eup	
Yongha IS	용한 교차로	Yeongilman-daero	Pohang City	Buk District Heunghae-eup	
No name	(이름 없음)	Haean-ro	Pohang City	Buk District Heunghae-eup	
Yeongil Bay Industrial Complex Gokgang Bridge 2nd Chilpo Bridge Chilpo Beach Chilpo Bridge Odo Bridge Erosion control Memorial Park	영일만산업단지 곡강교 칠포제2교 칠포해수욕장 칠포교 오도교 사방기념공원		Pohang City	Buk District Heunghae-eup	
Iga Bridge Yongdu Bridge Wolpo Elementary School	이가교 용두교 월포초등학교		Pohang City	Buk District Cheongha-myeon	
Wolpo Beach IS	월포해수욕장 교차로	Wolpo-ro; Haean-ro	Pohang City	Buk District Cheongha-myeon	
Cheongha IS	청하 교차로	National Route 7 (Donghae-daero); Prefectural Route 930 (Bihak-ro)	Pohang City	Buk District Cheongha-myeon	National Route 7 overlap Prefectural Route 930 overlap
Haehak Bridge	해학교		Pohang City	Buk District Cheongha-myeon	National Route 7 overlap Prefectural Route 930 overlap
Haehak Bridge			Pohang City	Buk District Songra-myeon	National Route 7 overlap Prefectural Route 930 overlap
Songra Football Field (POSCO Sports Land)	송라축구장 (포스코스포츠랜드)		Pohang City	Buk District Songra-myeon	National Route 7 overlap Prefectural Route 930 overlap
Songra Bus Stop	송라정류소		Pohang City	Buk District Songra-myeon	National Route 7 overlap Prefectural Route 930 overlap
Songra Elementary School Hwajin Branch (Closed)	송라초등학교 화진분교(폐교)		Pohang City	Buk District Songra-myeon	National Route 7 overlap Prefectural Route 930 overlap
Yucheon Bridge	유천교		Pohang City	Buk District Songra-myeon	National Route 7 overlap Prefectural Route 930 overlap
Yucheon Bridge			Yeongdeok County	Namjeong-myeon	National Route 7 overlap Prefectural Route 930 overlap
Jangsa Terminal	장사터미널		Yeongdeok County	Namjeong-myeon	National Route 7 overlap Prefectural Route 930 overlap
No name	(이름 없음)	Prefectural Route 930 (Sanjeong-ro)	Yeongdeok County	Namjeong-myeon	National Route 7 overlap Prefectural Route 930 overlap
Kyongbo Fossil Museum Namho Bridge	경보화석박물관 남호교		Yeongdeok County	Namjeong-myeon	National Route 7 overlap
Ocean Beach CC	오션뷰CC		Yeongdeok County	Ganggu-myeon	National Route 7 overlap
No name	(이름 없음)	Gangguhaean-gil	Yeongdeok County	Ganggu-myeon	National Route 7 overlap
Samsa Marine Park	삼사해상공원		Yeongdeok County	Ganggu-myeon	National Route 7 overlap
No name	(이름 없음)	Prefectural Route 914 (Gangsan-ro)	Yeongdeok County	Ganggu-myeon	National Route 7 overlap
Ganggu Bus Terminal	강구버스터미널		Yeongdeok County	Ganggu-myeon	National Route 7 overlap
West Ganggu Bridge	강구대교서단	National Route 7 (Donghae-daero)	Yeongdeok County	Ganggu-myeon	National Route 7 overlap
Ganggu Bridge	강구대교		Yeongdeok County	Ganggu-myeon	
(East Ganggu Bridge)	(강구대교 동단)	Gangyeong-ro; Ganggudaege-gil	Yeongdeok County	Ganggu-myeon	
(Yeongdeok Crab Street)	(영덕대게거리)	Ganggudaege-gil	Yeongdeok County	Ganggu-myeon	
Ganggu Port	강구항		Yeongdeok County	Ganggu-myeon	
Geumjin IS	금진삼거리	Beonyeong-gil	Yeongdeok County	Ganggu-myeon	
Hajeo Bridge	하저교		Yeongdeok County	Ganggu-myeon	
Hajeo Beach	하저해수욕장	Hajeo-gil	Yeongdeok County	Ganggu-myeon	
Yeongdeok Sunrise Park Daetan Beach	영덕해맞이공원 대탄해수욕장		Yeongdeok County	Yeongdeok-eup	
Obo IS	오보삼거리	Maejeong-gil	Yeongdeok County	Yeongdeok-eup	
Gyeongjeong Beach Gyeongjeong Bridge	경정해수욕장 경정교		Yeongdeok County	Chuksan-myeon	
Yeomjang IS	염장삼거리	Yeongdeokdaege-ro	Yeongdeok County	Chuksan-myeon	
(Chuksan-myeon Office Entrance)	(축산면사무소 입구)	Dogok-gil	Yeongdeok County	Chuksan-myeon	
Dogok IS	도곡삼거리	Yeongdeok-ro	Yeongdeok County	Chuksan-myeon	Terminus; Connected with National Route 7

== See also ==
- Roads and expressways in South Korea
- Transportation in South Korea
