= Anguksa (disambiguation) =

Anguksa is a Buddhist temple in Pyongsong, North Korea.

Anguksa may also refer to:

- Anguksa (Pohang), a Buddhist temple in Pohang, South Korea
- Anguksa (Seoul), a shrine in Nakseongdae, Seoul, South Korea
