= National Route 7 (South Korea) =

Road in South Korea

National Route 7
- 국도 제7호선
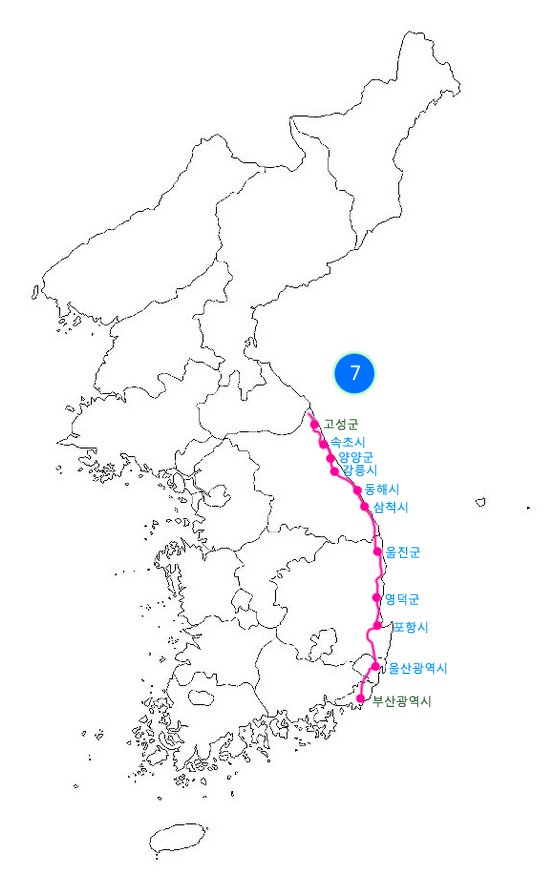

Route information
- Part of AH 1 AH 6
- Length: 1,192 km (741 mi)
- Existed: 31 August 1971–present

Major junctions
- South end: National Route 2 in Jung-gu, Busan
- North end: Onsong County, North Hamgyong Province (official); North Korean border near Goseong, Gangwon {unofficial)

Location
- Country: South Korea

Highway system
- Highway systems of South Korea; Expressways; National; Local
← National Route 6	→ National Route 11

National Route 7 (Korean: 국도 제7호선; RR: gukdo je7hoseon) is a national highway in South Korea. It connects Busan with Goseong in Gangwon Province. Before the division of the Korean Peninsula, the highway ran until Onsong, North Hamgyong Province, in present-day North Korea.

This highway will be one of the Asia Highway Route 6 until all segments of Donghae Expressway opens to traffic. Its name in Pohang/Goseong is Donghae-daero (Korean: 동해대로).

== History ==
National Route 7 is a major highway running along the east coast of the Korean Peninsula, with its origins tracing back to the Japanese colonial period. In the 1930s, Japan developed a transportation route from Busan to Wonsan to facilitate resource extraction and military control in the East Coast region. This laid the foundation for what would later become National Route 7.

After 1945 Liberation and the Korean War of 1953, the division of the peninsula into North and South meant that National Route 7 could no longer extend to its original terminus in Wonsan. Consequently, the road remained only within South Korea, with its endpoint shortened to Hyeonnae-myeon, Goseong County, Gangwon-do, near the Military Demarcation Line.

From the 1960s onward, as the South Korean government implemented its Five-Year Economic Development Plans, National Route 7 underwent repeated expansion and paving projects. Serving as a transportation corridor connecting major East Coast industrial cities and ports such as Busan, Ulsan, Pohang, Donghae, and Samcheok, the road became an important infrastructure foundation for national industrial development.

Since the 1990s, in order to distribute traffic and improve logistics efficiency, the Donghae Expressway was constructed parallel to National Route 7. During this process, some sections were downgraded from a National highway to a National-supported local highway, while other parts were reorganized as part of the broader transportation network through connections with expressways and other arterial roads.

Today, National Route 7 runs from Busan through Ulsan, Pohang, Yeongdeok, Donghae, Gangneung, and Sokcho to Goseong. It functions as a key transportation route linking ports, industrial zones, and tourist areas along the East Coast, and is also regarded as a strategically important road near the Military Demarcation Line. In the event of future reunification, National Route 7 has the potential to extend again to Wonsan, serving as a central artery in the Northeast Asian transportation network.

== Characteristics ==
In de jure, the highway passes through South & North Hamgyong Province, which are de facto controlled by North Korea. By this highway, it throughs Hwasong concentration camp.

== Main stopovers ==
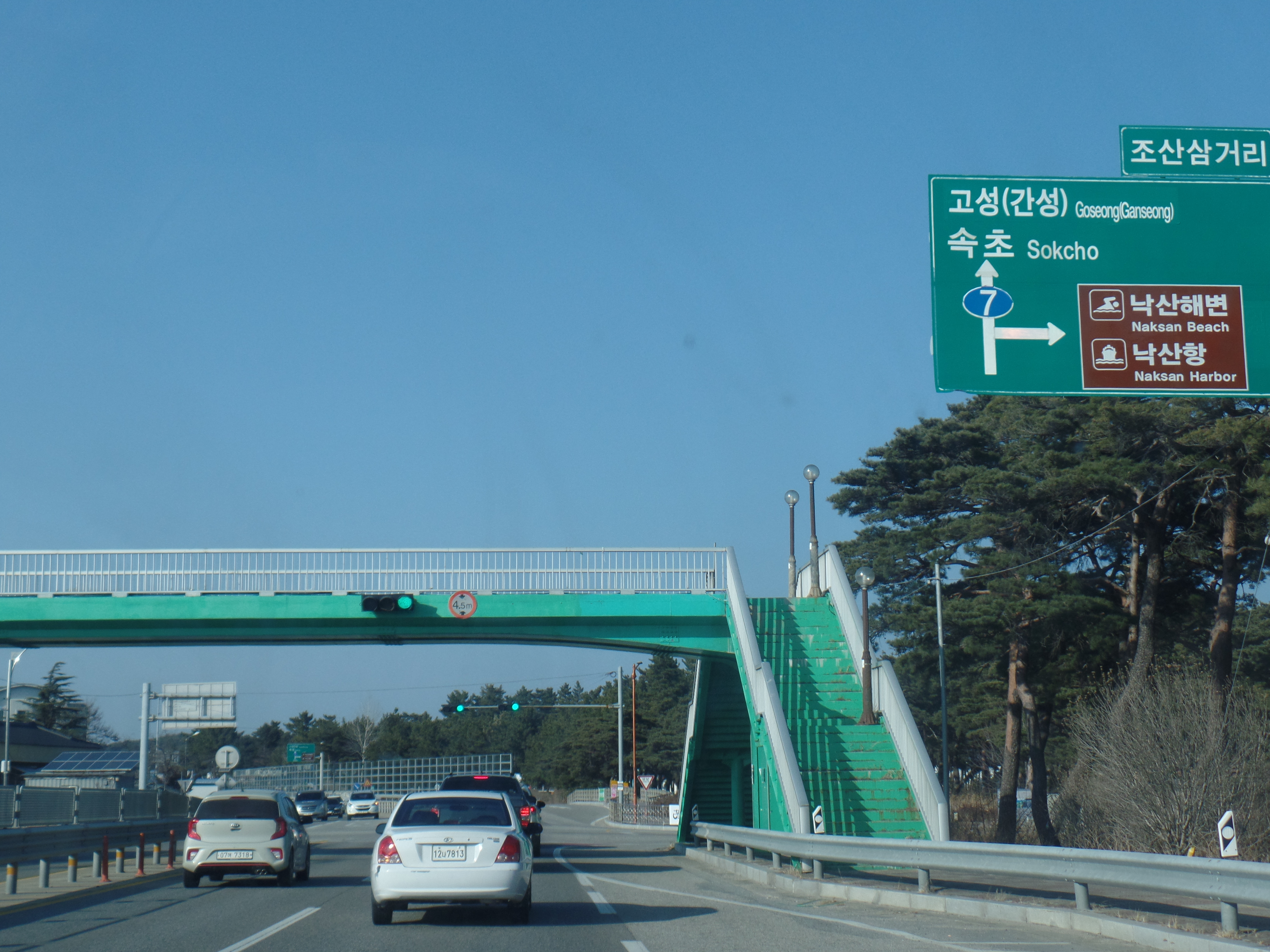
Josan Intersection at Yangyang County.

=== South Korea part ===
Busan

- Jung District - Dong District - Busanjin District - Yeonje District - Dongnae District - Geumjeong District

South Gyeongsang Province

- Yangsan

Busan

- Gijang County

South Gyeongsang Province

- Yangsan

Ulsan

- Ulju County - Nam District - Jung District - Buk District

North Gyeongsang Province

- Gyeongju - Pohang - Yeongdeok County - Uljin County

Gangwon Province

- Samcheok - Donghae - Gangneung - Yangyang County - Sokcho - Goseong County

=== North Korea part ===
Kangwon Province

- Kosong County - Tongchon County

South Hamgyong Province

- Wonsan - Kowon County - Kumya County - Hamhung - Hungnam - Pukchong County - Tanchon

North Hamgyong Province

- Kimchaek - Kilju County - Chongjin - Rason - Kyonghung County - Kyongwon County - Onsong County

== Major intersections ==
- (■): Motorway

IS: Intersection, IC: Interchange

=== Busan·Yangsan City ===
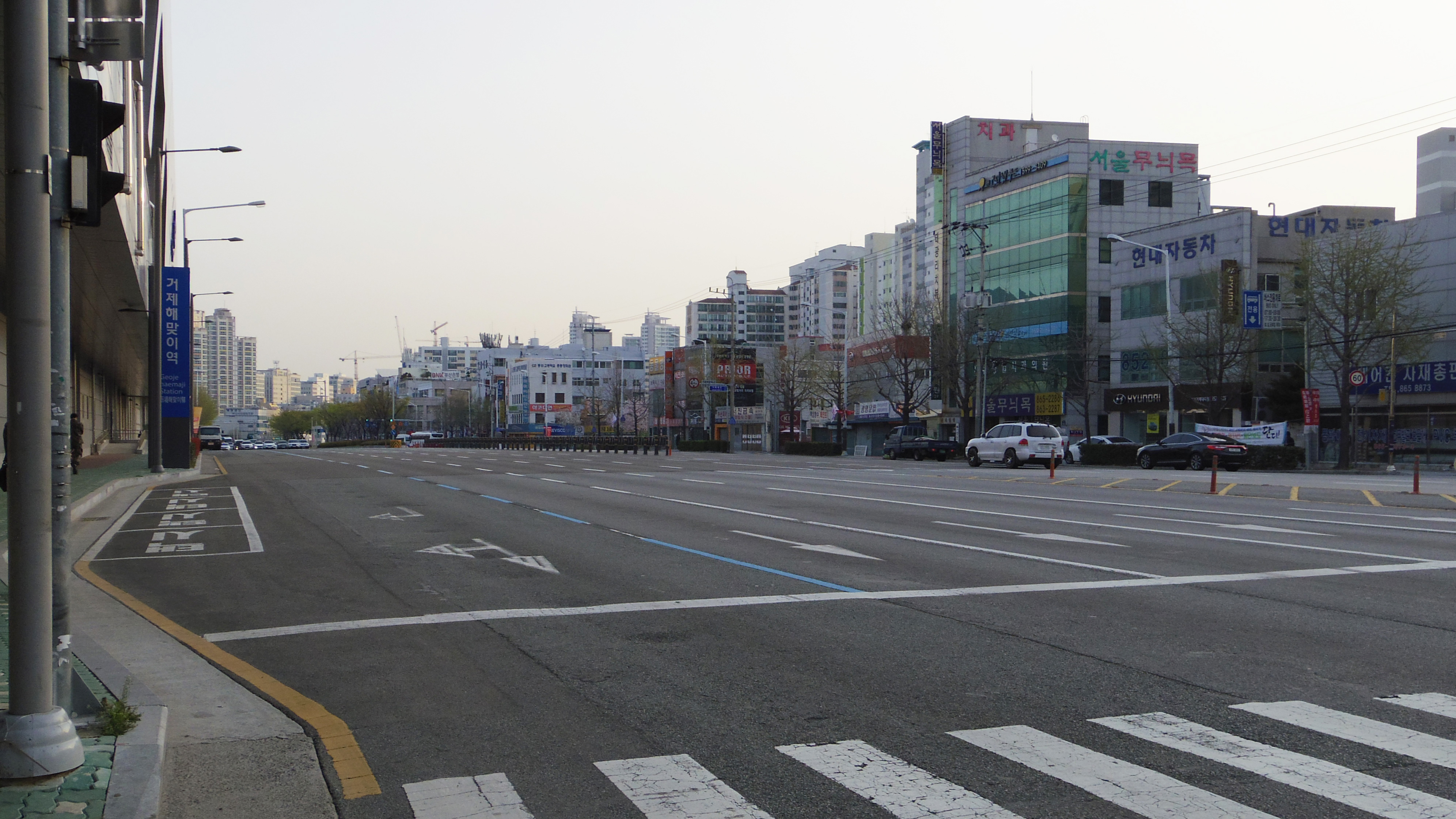
National Route 7 near Geojehaemaji station

Name	Hangul name	Connection	Location		Note
Old City Hall IS	옛시청 교차로 (옛시청사거리)	National Route 2 National Route 77 (Gudeok-ro); Taejong-ro	Busan	Jung District	Terminus
Gwangbok Lotte Department Store	롯데백화점 광복점		Busan	Jung District	
Busan Post Office IS	부산우체국 교차로	Daecheong-ro	Busan	Jung District	
Jungang Station	중앙역		Busan	Jung District	
Jungang-dong IS	중앙동사거리	Chungjang-daero	Busan	Jung District	
Yeongju IS	영주사거리	Daeyeong-ro	Busan	Jung District	
Yeongju IS		Daeyeong-ro	Busan	Dong District	
Busan Station	부산역		Busan	Dong District	
Choryang IS	초량 교차로	Gogwan-ro	Busan	Dong District	
Choryang Station	초량역		Busan	Dong District	
Gogwan Entrance IS (Busanjin Station)	고관입구 교차로 (부산진역)	Jungang-daero 349beon-gil	Busan	Dong District	
Jwacheon IS	좌천삼거리	Gwanmun-daero; Jaseong-ro	Busan	Dong District	
Jwacheon Station	좌천역		Busan	Dong District	
Busanjin Market Underpass	부산진시장지하차도	Jinsijang-ro	Busan	Dong District	
Beomgok IS	범곡 교차로	Mangyang-ro; Sinam-ro	Busan	Dong District	
Beomil level crossing	범일과선교		Busan	Busanjin District	
Beomnaegol IS (Beomnaegol Station)	범내골 교차로 (범내골역)	Beomil-ro; Hwangnyeong-daero; Beomil-ro 192beon-gil	Busan	Busanjin District	
No name	(이름 없음)	Jungang-daero 644beon-gil	Busan	Busanjin District	
Seomyeon IS (Seomyeon Station)	서면 교차로 (서면역)	Gaya-daero; Saessak-ro; Seojeon-ro	Busan	Busanjin District	
Bujeon IS (Bujeon Station)	부전사거리 (부전역)	Dongseong-ro; Dongcheon-ro; Jungang-daero 783beon-gil	Busan	Busanjin District	
Samjeon IS	삼전 교차로	Jeonpo-daero; Beomjeon-ro	Busan	Busanjin District	
Songgong IS	송공삼거리	Jungang-daero	Busan	Busanjin District	
Hamajeong IS	하마정 교차로	Dongpyeong-ro	Busan	Busanjin District	
Hyundai Apartment	현대아파트앞	Asiad-daero	Busan	Yeonje District	
Nammungu IS (Geojehaemaji station) (Geoje Station)	남문구사거리 (거제해맞이역) (거제역)	World Cup-daero	Busan	Yeonje District	
Gyodae IS (Busan National University of Education Station) (Isabelle High School) (Isabel Middle School)	교대사거리 (교대역) (이사벨고등학교) (이사벨중학교)	Jungang-daeor; Gyodae-ro; Myeongnyun-ro	Busan	Yeonje District	
Busan Naesung Middle School	부산내성중학교		Busan	Dongnae District	
Naeseong IS (Dongnae Station) (Naeseong Underpass)	내성 교차로 (동래역) (내성지하차도)	National Route 14 (Chungnyeol-daero)	Busan	Dongnae District	
Old Dongbu Terminal (Myeongnyun Station)	옛동부터미널 교차로 (명륜역)	Dongnae-ro	Busan	Dongnae District	
Oncheon Bridge IS	온천교사거리	Geumganggongwon-ro; Sisil-ro	Busan	Dongnae District	
Oncheonjang Station	온천장역		Busan	Dongnae District	
Sojeongcheon IS	소정천삼거리	Singmurwon-ro	Busan	Geumjeong District	
Oncheon 5th Bridge	온천5호교	Jangjeononcheoncheon-ro	Busan	Geumjeong District	
Geumjeong Tax Office	금정세무서		Busan	Geumjeong District	
Bugok IS	부곡사거리	Busandaehak-ro; Bugok-ro	Busan	Geumjeong District	
Geumjeong Lotte Mart Geumyang Elementary School Geumjeong Health Center Geumjeong District Office	롯데마트 금정점 금양초등학교 금정구보건소 금정구청		Busan	Geumjeong District	
(Guseo Underpass)	(구서지하차도)	Gyeongbu Expressway; Geumjeong-ro	Busan	Geumjeong District	
Geumjeong E-mart Dusil Station Namsan Station Geumjeong Middle School Beomeosa Station	이마트 금정점 두실역 남산역 금정중학교 범어사역		Busan	Geumjeong District	
Beomeosa IS	범어사어귀삼거리	Cheongnyong-ro	Busan	Geumjeong District	
No name	(이름 없음)	Gyeongbu Expressway; Busan Ring Expressway; Gobun-ro	Busan	Geumjeong District	Connected with Nopo IC
Nopo IS	노포삼거리	Noposasong-ro	Busan	Geumjeong District	
Nopo Station Busan Central Bus Terminal	노포역 부산종합버스터미널		Busan	Geumjeong District	
Geumjeong Sports Park Entrance	금정체육공원입구	Gyeongbu Expressway; Busan Ring Expressway; Cheyukgongwon-ro 399beon-gil	Busan	Geumjeong District	Connected with Nopo IC
Yeorak Overpass	여락고가교		Busan	Geumjeong District	
Yeorak Overpass			Yangsan City	Dong-myeon	
Yangcheon Elementary School	영천초등학교	Yeongcheon-ro	Yangsan City	Dong-myeon	
Imgima-eul Entrance	임기마을입구	Cheolmasamdong-ro	Yangsan City	Dong-myeon	
Beopgi IS	법기 교차로	(Beopgi-ro)	Yangsan City	Dong-myeon	
Wolpyeong IS (Wolpyeong Overpass)	월평사거리 (월평고가차도)	Prefectural Route 60 (Jeonggwan-ro) (Dongseo-ro)	Gijang County	Jeonggwan-eup	
Wolpyeonggogae IS	월평고개사거리	Deokgyeseo-ro; Bumyeong-gil	Gijang County	Jeonggwan-eup	
Wolpyeonggogae IS		Deokgyeseo-ro; Bumyeong-gil	Yangsan City	Deokgye-dong	
69beon IS (Deokgye Underpass)	69번 교차로 (덕계지하차도)	Prefectural Route 1028 (Deokgye-ro)	Yangsan City	Deokgye-dong	Prefectural Route 1028 overlap
Deokgye IS	덕계사거리	Maegokuisan-ro; Beonyeong-ro	Yangsan City	Deokgye-dong	Prefectural Route 1028 overlap
Cheonbulsa Entrance	천불사입구	Oesan-gil	Yangsan City	Deokgye-dong	Prefectural Route 1028 overlap
Daeseung 1 Apartment Entrance	대승1차아파트입구		Yangsan City	Deokgye-dong	Prefectural Route 1028 overlap
Pyeongsan Bridge	평산교		Yangsan City	Deokgye-dong	Prefectural Route 1028 overlap
Pyeongsan Bridge			Yangsan City	Pyeongsan-dong	Prefectural Route 1028 overlap
Pyeongsan IS	평산사거리	Deokgye-ro; Pyeongsan-ro	Yangsan City	Pyeongsan-dong	Prefectural Route 1028 overlap
72beon IS	72번 교차로	Sanbuk-ro	Yangsan City	Soju-dong	Prefectural Route 1028 overlap
Ungsang Library	웅상도서관		Yangsan City	Soju-dong	Prefectural Route 1028 overlap
Jujinma-eul	주진마을	Jujin-ro	Yangsan City	Soju-dong	Prefectural Route 1028 overlap
73beon IS	73번 교차로	Moraedeul-gil	Yangsan City	Soju-dong	Prefectural Route 1028 overlap
Myeonggok Bridge	명곡교		Yangsan City	Soju-dong	Prefectural Route 1028 overlap
Myeonggok Bridge			Yangsan City	Seochang-dong	Prefectural Route 1028 overlap
Ungsang Fire Station	웅상소방파출소	Deokmyeong-ro	Yangsan City	Seochang-dong	Prefectural Route 1028 overlap
Ungsang Elementary School Entrance	웅상초등교입구	Myeongdong 1-gil	Yangsan City	Seochang-dong	Prefectural Route 1028 overlap
Ungsangsaema-eul	웅상새마을탑	Seochang-ro	Yangsan City	Seochang-dong	Prefectural Route 1028 overlap
Baekdongma-eul Entrance	백동마을입구	Sojuhoeya-ro	Yangsan City	Seochang-dong	Prefectural Route 1028 overlap
77beon IS	77번 교차로	Samho-ro; Soju-ro	Yangsan City	Seochang-dong	Prefectural Route 1028 overlap
78beon IS	78번 교차로	Junam-ro; Samho-ro	Yangsan City	Seochang-dong	Prefectural Route 1028 overlap
Seochang Elementary School Yongamma-eul Entrance	서창초등학교 용암마을입구		Yangsan City	Seochang-dong	Prefectural Route 1028 overlap
Bukbu IS	북부사거리	Daeun-ro; Yongam-gil	Yangsan City	Seochang-dong	Prefectural Route 1028 overlap
Seochang IS	서창삼거리	Seochang-ro	Yangsan City	Seochang-dong	Prefectural Route 1028 overlap
Pyeondeulma-eul	편들마을	Pyeondeul-gil	Yangsan City	Seochang-dong	Prefectural Route 1028 overlap
Yongdang IS	용당사거리	Yongju-ro	Yangsan City	Seochang-dong	Prefectural Route 1028 overlap
No name	(이름 없음)	Prefectural Route 1028 (Yongdangnaegwang-ro)	Yangsan City	Seochang-dong	Prefectural Route 1028 overlap
Hoeya Bridge IS	회야교 교차로	Ungbigongdan-gil	Yangsan City	Seochang-dong	
Hoeya Bridge	회야교		Yangsan City	Seochang-dong	Continuation into Ulsan

=== Ulsan ===
Name	Hangul name	Connection	Location		Note
Hoeya Bridge	회야교		Ulju County	Ungchon-myeon	Yangsan - Ulsan border line
Ulsan CC Entrance Sangmaema-eul	울산CC입구 상대마을		Ulju County	Ungchon-myeon	
Sewage Treatment Plant Entrance	하수처리장입구	Mulgeonneo-gil	Ulju County	Ungchon-myeon	
Jungdaema-eul	중대마을	Sangdae-gil	Ulju County	Ungchon-myeon	
Hamaema-eul Jeorima-eul Daejinma-eul	하대마을 저리마을 대진마을		Ulju County	Ungchon-myeon	
Chocheonma-eul	초천마을	Saechocheon-gil; Seojung 2-gil	Ulju County	Ungchon-myeon	
Gokcheon IS	곡천삼거리	Gokcheondongmun-gil	Ulju County	Ungchon-myeon	
Wondanggol IS (Ulsan High School of Arts)	원당골사거리 울산예술고등학교		Ulju County	Ungchon-myeon	
Daebok IS	대복삼거리	Samdong-ro	Ulju County	Ungchon-myeon	
Wonteo IS	원터 교차로		Ulju County	Ungchon-myeon	
Banjeong IS	반정삼거리	Samjeong-ro	Ulju County	Cheongnyang-myeon	
Bamtigogae	밤티고개		Ulju County	Cheongnyang-myeon	
Yulhyeonma-eul	율현마을	Yulhyeoneumdal-gil	Ulju County	Cheongnyang-myeon	
Munsu IC	문수 나들목	Donghae Expressway	Ulju County	Cheongnyang-myeon	
Munsusa Entrance	문수사입구	Yulriyeonghae 1-gil	Ulju County	Cheongnyang-myeon	
Yulri Bus Garage (Overpass)	율리공영차고지 (고가차도)	National Route 14 (Cheongnyang-ro)	Ulju County	Cheongnyang-myeon	National Route 14 overlap
Duhyeon IS	두현삼거리	Cheongnyangcheonbyeon-ro	Ulju County	Cheongnyang-myeon	National Route 14 overlap
Mugeohapdong Bus stop	무거합동정류소		Ulju County	Cheongnyang-myeon	National Route 14 overlap
Mugeo IS	무거삼거리	Munsu-ro	Ulsan	Nam District	National Route 14 overlap
Wooshin High School	우신고등학교앞	Daehak-ro 11beon-gil	Ulsan	Nam District	National Route 14 overlap
Jeonggol IS	정골삼거리	Okhyeon-ro	Ulsan	Nam District	National Route 14 overlap
Ulsan College Seobu Campus	울산과학대학교 서부캠퍼스	Daehak-ro 55beon-gil	Ulsan	Nam District	National Route 14 overlap
University of Ulsan	울산대학교		Ulsan	Nam District	National Route 14 overlap
Back of Ulsan University	울산대후문		Ulsan	Nam District	National Route 14 overlap
Soejeong IS	쇠정사거리	Sinbok-ro	Ulsan	Nam District	National Route 14 overlap
Ulsan IC	울산 나들목 (신복로터리)	Ulsan Expressway; Southern Ring Road; Samho-ro	Ulsan	Nam District	National Route 14 overlap
Sanho Apartment	산호아파트앞	Samho-ro 37beon-gil	Ulsan	Nam District	National Route 14 overlap
South of Samho Bridge IS	삼호교남 교차로	National Route 24 (Ulmil-ro); Namsan-ro	Ulsan	Nam District	National Route 14 overlap
Samho Bridge	삼호교		Ulsan	Nam District	National Route 14 overlap
Samho Bridge			Ulsan	Jung District	National Route 14 overlap
Daun IS	다운사거리	National Route 14 (Daun-ro); Taehwa-ro	Ulsan	Jung District	National Route 14 overlap
Techno Park Complex Entrance	테크노파크단지입구	Dajeon-ro	Ulsan	Jung District	
Jeil Middle Entrance	제일중입구	Iljung-ro	Ulsan	Jung District	
Jungang High Entrance	중앙고입구	Nangok-ro	Ulsan	Jung District	
Sagokcheon IS	사곡천 교차로	Okdong ~ Nongso Motorway	Ulsan	Jung District	
Wolyugok IS	원유곡 교차로	Jongga 3-gil	Ulsan	Jung District	
Yugok Bridge	유곡교	Yugok-ro	Ulsan	Jung District	
Ulsan Metropolitan Office of Education	울산광역시교육청		Ulsan	Jung District	
Gilchonma-eul Entrance	길촌마을입구	Jongga-ro	Ulsan	Jung District	
Ujeong IPARK	우정아이파크입구	Ujeong 2-gil	Ulsan	Jung District	
Bukjeong IS (Seongan Overpass)	북정 교차로 (성안고가교)	National Route 31 (Myeongnyun-ro); Seongan-ro; Dongheonseo-gil	Ulsan	Jung District	National Route 31 overlap
Bukjeong IS	북정삼거리	Okgyodong-gil	Ulsan	Jung District	National Route 31 overlap
Boksan IS	복산삼거리	Boksan1dong-gil; Songol 4-gil	Ulsan	Jung District	National Route 31 overlap
Boksan 1-dong Community Center	복산1동주민센터		Ulsan	Jung District	National Route 31 overlap
Dongdeok Apartment	동덕아파트앞	Gyebyeon-ro	Ulsan	Jung District	National Route 31 overlap
Jung District Office IS (Jung District Office Underpass)	중구청삼거리 (중구청지하차도)	Hwahap-ro	Ulsan	Jung District	National Route 31 overlap
Samhwan Apartment	삼환아파트앞	Pyeongsan-ro	Ulsan	Jung District	National Route 31 overlap
Ulsan Hyein School	울산혜인학교		Ulsan	Jung District	National Route 31 overlap
Dongjung IS	동중사거리	Gwaknam-gil	Ulsan	Jung District	National Route 31 overlap
Seodong IS	서동삼거리	Dongcheonseo-ro	Ulsan	Jung District	National Route 31 overlap
Samil Elementary School	삼일초등학교앞	Dongcheon 4-gil	Ulsan	Jung District	National Route 31 overlap
Seodong IS	서동사거리	Byeongyeong-ro; Dongcheon 2-gil	Ulsan	Jung District	National Route 31 overlap
Korea Polytechnic University	한국폴리텍VII대학	Sanjeon-gil; Dongcheon 1-gil	Ulsan	Jung District	National Route 31 overlap
Samil Bridge	삼일교		Ulsan	Jung District	National Route 31 overlap
Samil Bridge			Ulsan	Buk District	National Route 31 overlap
Jinjang IS	진장사거리	Angibeondeuk-gil; Jinjangyutong-ro	Ulsan	Buk District	National Route 31 overlap
Sangbang IS	상방사거리	National Route 31 (Muryong-ro); Saneop-ro	Ulsan	Buk District	National Route 31 overlap
Buk District Office	북구청		Ulsan	Buk District	
Hwabong IS (Dongulsan Tax Office)	화봉사거리 (동울산세무서)	Hwabong-ro; Angibeondeuk-gil	Ulsan	Buk District	
Ulsan Airport (Hwabong Underpass)	울산공항 (화봉지하차도)	Hwasanjungang-ro	Ulsan	Buk District	
Songjeongma-eul Entrance	송정마을입구	Jidang 3-gil	Ulsan	Buk District	
Early Childhood Education and Development Institute	유아교육진흥원	Hogye-ro	Ulsan	Buk District	
Sangan Bridge IS	상안교사거리	Dong-daero	Ulsan	Buk District	
Sindap IS	신답삼거리	Sindap-ro	Ulsan	Buk District	
Wondonghyeondae Apartment Entrance	원동현대아파트입구	Gorae-ro	Ulsan	Buk District	
Cheongok IS	천곡사거리	Hogye-ro	Ulsan	Buk District	
Yaksuma-eul Entrance	약수마을입구		Ulsan	Buk District	
Jungsan IS	중산 교차로	Otobaelri-ro	Ulsan	Buk District	
Hwajeongma-eul Entrance	화정마을입구	Cheongokjaejeon-gil	Ulsan	Buk District	
Ihwa Middle School	이화중학교		Ulsan	Buk District	
Ihwa IS	이화사거리	Hwajeong 4-gil Ihwa 5-gil	Ulsan	Buk District	Continuation into North Gyeongsang Province

=== North Gyeongsang Province ===
Name	Hangul name	Connection	Location		Note
Gwanmunseong	관문성		Gyeongju City	Oedong-eup	Ulsan - North Gyeongsang Province border line
Gyedong Bridge	계동교		Gyeongju City	Oedong-eup	
Mohwa Station Mohwa Terminal	모화역 모화터미널		Gyeongju City	Oedong-eup	
No name	(이름 없음)	National Route 14 (Gwanmun-ro)	Gyeongju City	Oedong-eup	National Route 14 overlap
Oedong Agro-Industrial Complex	외동농공단지		Gyeongju City	Oedong-eup	National Route 14 overlap
Gueo IS	구어사거리	National Route 14 (Ipsil-ro)	Gyeongju City	Oedong-eup	National Route 14 overlap
No name	(이름 없음)	Prefectural Route 904 (Ipsil-ro)	Gyeongju City	Oedong-eup	Prefectural Route 904 overlap
Yeonan Bridge	연안교	Prefectural Route 904 (Naeoe-ro)	Gyeongju City	Oedong-eup	Prefectural Route 904 overlap
South Gyeongju IC	남경주 나들목	Donghae Expressway	Gyeongju City	Oedong-eup	
Sirae Bridge	시래교		Gyeongju City	Bulguk-dong	
Bulguk-dong Community Center	불국동주민센터		Gyeongju City	Bulguk-dong	
Bulguksa Intercity Bus stop Bulguksa Station	불국사시외버스정류장 불국사역	Bulguk-ro; Guseong 1-gil	Gyeongju City	Bulguk-dong	
Korea Advertising Image Museum	한국광고영상박물관		Gyeongju City	Bulguk-dong	
Tongiljeon IS	통일전삼거리	Tongil-ro	Gyeongju City	Wolseong-dong	
Dongbang Elementary School Dongbang Station Sinmun of Silla Tomb	동방초등학교 동방역 신문왕릉		Gyeongju City	Wolseong-dong	
Sacheonwangsa Site IS	사천왕사지삼거리	Tongil-ro	Gyeongju City	Wolseong-dong	
Baeban IS	배반네거리	Seorabeol-daero; Saneop-ro	Gyeongju City	Wolseong-dong	
Bakmulgwan IS	박물관네거리	Iljeong-ro	Gyeongju City	Wolseong-dong	
Anapji	안압지		Gyeongju City	Wolseong-dong	
Seondeok IS	선덕네거리	National Route 4 (Yangjeong-ro)	Gyeongju City	Wolseong-dong	National Route 4 overlap
Palujeong IS	팔우정삼거리	National Route 4 (Taejong-ro)	Gyeongju City	Seongdong-dong	National Route 4 overlap
Yeokjeon IS (Gyeongju station)	역전삼거리 (경주역)	Hwarang-ro	Gyeongju City	Seongdong-dong	
Gyeongju Station Intercity Bus stop Gyeongju Tax Office	경주역시외버스정류장 경주세무서		Gyeongju City	Seongdong-dong	
Gyeongju Bridge	경주교		Gyeongju City	Seongdong-dong	
Gyeongju Bridge			Gyeongju City	Dongcheon-dong	
Sicheong Entrance IS	시청입구삼거리	Baegyul-ro	Gyeongju City	Dongcheon-dong	
Gyeongju City Library	경주시립도서관		Gyeongju City	Hwangseong-dong	
Hwangseong Underpass IS	황성지하도네거리	Prefectural Route 68 (Sogeumgang-ro)	Gyeongju City	Hwangseong-dong	
Hwangseong Underpass	황성지하도		Gyeongju City	Yonggang-dong	
Yonggang IS	용강네거리	Saneop-ro; Yurim-ro	Gyeongju City	Yonggang-dong	
Geunhwa Girls' High School IS	근화여고네거리	Gongdan-ro; Seungsam 2-gil	Gyeongju City	Yonggang-dong	
Seungsam IS	승삼네거리	Dabul-ro; Yurim-ro 13beon-gil	Gyeongju City	Yonggang-dong	
Sindang IS	신당 교차로	Gangbyeon-ro	Gyeongju City	Cheonbuk-myeon	
Moa Elementary School	모아초등학교		Gyeongju City	Cheonbuk-myeon	
North Gyeongju IC	북경주 나들목	National Route 20 (Geonposaneop-ro)	Gyeongju City	Cheonbuk-myeon	
Gangdong Bridge	강동대교		Gyeongju City	Gangdong-myeon	
Gangdong IC	강동 나들목	National Route 28 (Hoguk-ro)	Gyeongju City	Gangdong-myeon	National Route 28 overlap
Yugeum Overpass	유금지하교	Prefectural Route 945 (Cheongang-ro); Gangdong-ro	Gyeongju City	Gangdong-myeon	National Route 28 overlap
Yugeum IC	유금 나들목	National Route 28 (Donghae-daero)	Gyeongju City	Gangdong-myeon	National Route 28 overlap
Yugang Tunnel	유강터널		Gyeongju City	Gangdong-myeon	Approximately 915m
Yugang Tunnel			Pohang City	Nam District Yeonil-eup	Approximately 915m
Yugang IS	유강 교차로	National Route 31 (Yeongilman-daero)	Pohang City	Nam District Yeonil-eup	
No name	(이름 없음)	Yugang-gil	Pohang City	Nam District Yeonil-eup	
Gongdae IC	공대 나들목	Cheongam-ro	Pohang City	Nam District	
Hyoja Station	효자역		Pohang City	Nam District	
Hyoja IS	효자삼거리	Yeonil-ro	Pohang City	Nam District	
Daejam IS	대잠 교차로	Huimang-daero	Pohang City	Nam District	
Pohang Munhwa Broadcasting Corp.	포항문화방송		Pohang City	Nam District	
(Idong Overpass)	(이동고가차도)	Posco-daero	Pohang City	Buk District	
Yanghak IS	양학사거리	Yanghak-ro; Yanghakcheon-ro	Pohang City	Buk District	
Pohang Nambu Elementary School	포항남부초등학교		Pohang City	Buk District	
Yongheung Overpass	용흥고가차도		Pohang City	Buk District	
Gamsilgol IS (Gamsil Bridge)	감실골사거리 (감실교)	Yongheung-ro	Pohang City	Buk District	
(Dongji Bridge)	(동지교)	Buljong-ro; Saemaeul-ro	Pohang City	Buk District	
Front of shooting range	사격장앞	Yongheung-ro	Pohang City	Buk District	
Uhyeon IS	우현사거리	Saecheonnyeon-daero; Jungang-ro	Pohang City	Buk District	
Pohang Yeongsin Middle School Pohang Youngshin High School Pohang Myeongdo School	포항영신중학교 포항영신고등학교 포항명도학교		Pohang City	Buk District	
Uihyeon IS	의현 교차로	Yeongilman-daero	Pohang City	Buk District Heunghae-eup	
Seonggok IC	성곡 나들목	National Route 28 (Donghae-daero)	Pohang City	Buk District Heunghae-eup	
Sunlin College	선린대입구	Chogok-gil	Pohang City	Buk District Heunghae-eup	
Heunghae IS	흥해사거리	Handong-ro	Pohang City	Buk District Heunghae-eup	
Yakseong IS	약성삼거리	Samheung-ro	Pohang City	Buk District Heunghae-eup	
Gokgang Bridge	곡강교		Pohang City	Buk District Heunghae-eup	
Chilpo IS	칠포 교차로	Chilpo-ro	Pohang City	Buk District Heunghae-eup	
Cheongha Agricultural Complex	청하농공단지	Donghae-daero 2315beon-gil	Pohang City	Buk District Cheongha-myeon	
Cheongha IS	청하삼거리	Cheongha-ro	Pohang City	Buk District Cheongha-myeon	
Cheongha IS	청하 교차로	Prefectural Route 20 (Wolpo-ro); Prefectural Route 930 (Bihak-ro)	Pohang City	Buk District Cheongha-myeon	Prefectural Route 20, 930 overlap
Haehak Bridge	해학교		Pohang City	Buk District Cheongha-myeon	Prefectural Route 20, 930 overlap
Haehak Bridge			Pohang City	Buk District Songna-myeon	Prefectural Route 20, 930 overlap
Songra Football Field (POSCO Sports Land)	송라축구장 (포스코스포츠랜드)		Pohang City	Buk District Songna-myeon	Prefectural Route 20, 930 overlap
Songra Bus stop	송라정류소		Pohang City	Buk District Songna-myeon	Prefectural Route 20, 930 overlap
Songra IS	송라 교차로	Bogyeong-ro	Pohang City	Buk District Songna-myeon	Prefectural Route 20, 930 overlap
Songra Elementary School Hwajin Branch (Closed)	송라초등학교 화진분교 (폐교)		Pohang City	Buk District Songna-myeon	Prefectural Route 20, 930 overlap
Yucheon Bridge	유천교		Pohang City	Buk District Songna-myeon	Prefectural Route 20, 930 overlap
Yucheon Bridge			Yeongdeok County	Namjeong-myeon	Prefectural Route 20, 930 overlap
Jangsa Terminal	장사터미널		Yeongdeok County	Namjeong-myeon	Prefectural Route 20, 930 overlap
Jangsa IS	장사삼거리	Prefectural Route 930 (Sanjeong-ro)	Yeongdeok County	Namjeong-myeon	Prefectural Route 20, 930 overlap
Kyongbo Fossil Museum Namho Bridge	경보화석박물관 남호교		Yeongdeok County	Namjeong-myeon	Prefectural Route 20 overlap
Ocean Beach CC	오션뷰CC		Yeongdeok County	Ganggu-myeon	Prefectural Route 20 overlap
No name	(이름 없음)	Gangguhaean-gil	Yeongdeok County	Ganggu-myeon	Prefectural Route 20 overlap
Samsa Marine Park	삼사해상공원		Yeongdeok County	Ganggu-myeon	Prefectural Route 20 overlap
No name	(이름 없음)	Prefectural Route 914 (Gangsan-ro)	Yeongdeok County	Ganggu-myeon	Prefectural Route 20 overlap
Ganggu Bus Terminal	강구버스터미널		Yeongdeok County	Ganggu-myeon	Prefectural Route 20 overlap
West side of Ganggu Bridge	강구대교 서단	Prefectural Route 20 (Yeongdeokdaege-ro); Ganggusijang-gil	Yeongdeok County	Ganggu-myeon	Prefectural Route 20 overlap
Ganggu-myeon Office	강구면사무소		Yeongdeok County	Ganggu-myeon	
Yeongdeok IC	영덕 나들목	Dangjin-Yeongdeok Expressway	Yeongdeok County	Yeongdeok-eup	
Yeongdeok Agricultural Complex	영덕농공단지		Yeongdeok County	Yeongdeok-eup	
Namsan IS	남산 교차로	Yeongdeok-ro	Yeongdeok County	Yeongdeok-eup	
Sin Yeongdeok Bridge (Osipcheon Bridge)	신 영덕대교		Yeongdeok County	Yeongdeok-eup	
Yeongdeokpiam Tunnel	영덕피암터널		Yeongdeok County	Yeongdeok-eup	Approximately 200m
Deokgok IS	덕곡 교차로	National Route 34 (Guncheong-gil); Hajeo-gil	Yeongdeok County	Yeongdeok-eup	
Hwasu IS	화수 교차로	Yeongdeok-ro	Yeongdeok County	Yeongdeok-eup	
Maejeong IS	매정 교차로	Yeongdeok-ro; Maejeong-gil	Yeongdeok County	Yeongdeok-eup	
Gogok 1 Bridge Gogok 2 Bridge	고곡1교 고곡2교		Yeongdeok County	Chuksan-myeon	
Chuksan IS	축산 교차로	Yeongdeok-ro	Yeongdeok County	Chuksan-myeon	
Seongnae IS	성내 교차로	Yeongdeok-ro	Yeongdeok County	Chuksan-myeon	
Songcheon IS	송천 교차로	Prefectural Route 918 (Changsuyeonghae-ro) (Yejumogeun-gil)	Yeongdeok County	Yeonghae-myeon	
Songcheon 1 Bridge	송천1교		Yeongdeok County	Yeonghae-myeon	
Songcheon 1 Bridge			Yeongdeok County	Byeonggok-myeon	
Gakri-ri IS	각리리 교차로	Gakri-gil	Yeongdeok County	Byeonggok-myeon	
Geomuyeok-ri IS	거무역리 교차로	Naeryuksunhwan-gil	Yeongdeok County	Byeonggok-myeon	
Goraebul IS	고래불 교차로	Yeong-gil; Yeong 1-gil Yeong 2-gil	Yeongdeok County	Byeonggok-myeon	
Byeonggok IS	병곡 교차로	Huindol-ro; Byeonggok-gil	Yeongdeok County	Byeonggok-myeon	
Baekseok IS	백석 교차로	Huindol-ro	Yeongdeok County	Byeonggok-myeon	
Geumgok IS	금곡 교차로	Gunjigyeong-ro	Yeongdeok County	Byeonggok-myeon	
Geumeum IS	금음 교차로	Gunjigyeong-ro	Uljin County	Hupo-myeon	
Samyul IS	삼율 교차로	Uljindaege-ro; Huposamyul-ro	Uljin County	Hupo-myeon	
Samyul Bridge	삼율교		Uljin County	Hupo-myeon	
Hupo IS	후포 교차로	Huposamyul-ro; Silbae-gil	Uljin County	Hupo-myeon	
Silbae IS	실배 교차로	Huposamchil-gil	Uljin County	Hupo-myeon	
Hakgok 1 IS	학곡1 교차로		Uljin County	Pyeonghae-eup	
Hakgok 2 IS	학곡2 교차로	Hakgok 7-gil	Uljin County	Pyeonghae-eup	
Pyeonghae IS	평해 교차로	National Route 88 (Wolsongjeong-ro)	Uljin County	Pyeonghae-eup	
Pyeonghae Bridge	평해대교		Uljin County	Pyeonghae-eup	
Wolsong IS	월송 교차로	Wolsongjeong-ro	Uljin County	Pyeonghae-eup	Connected with Wolsong IS
Wolsomgbokgae Tunnel	월송복개터널		Uljin County	Pyeonghae-eup	Approximately 100m
Hwangbo Bridge	황보교		Uljin County	Pyeonghae-eup	
Hwangbo Bridge			Uljin County	Giseong-myeon	
Airport IS	공항 교차로	Giseong-ro	Uljin County	Giseong-myeon	Connected with Uljin Airport
Giseong IS	기성 교차로	Giseong-ro; Giseonghaebyeon-ro	Uljin County	Giseong-myeon	
Giseong Bridge	기성교		Uljin County	Giseong-myeon	
Cheoksan IS	척산 교차로	Giseong-ro; Bangyul-gil	Uljin County	Giseong-myeon	
Sadong IS	사동 교차로	Giseong-ro; Samsansinheung-ro	Uljin County	Giseong-myeon	
Sadong Bridge	사동교	Sadong 1-gil Sadong 2-gil	Uljin County	Giseong-myeon	
Mangyang IS	망양 교차로	Mangyang-ro	Uljin County	Giseong-myeon	
Mangyang 1 Tunnel	망양1터널		Uljin County	Giseong-myeon	Right tunnel: Approximately 690m Left tunnel: Approximately 760m
Mangyang 2 Tunnel	망양2터널		Uljin County	Giseong-myeon	Right tunnel: Approximately 593m Left tunnel: Approximately 497m
Mangyang 1 IS	망양1 교차로	Mangyang-ro	Uljin County	Giseong-myeon	
Wonnam Bridge	원남교	Mangyangbuk-ro	Uljin County	Maehwa-myeon	
Deoksin IS	덕신 교차로	Prefectural Route 917 (Mangyangjeong-ro)	Uljin County	Maehwa-myeon	
Maehwa IS	매화 교차로	Maehwa 1-gil	Uljin County	Maehwa-myeon	
Geummae IS	금매 교차로	Wonnam-ro	Uljin County	Maehwa-myeon	
Seonglyugul IS	성류굴 교차로	Wonnam-ro	Uljin County	Geunnam-myeon	
Noeum IS	노음 교차로	Uljinbuk-ro	Uljin County	Geunnam-myeon	
Wangpicheon Bridge	왕피천대교		Uljin County	Geunnam-myeon	
Uljinnambu IS	울진남부 교차로	National Route 36; Prefectural Route 917 (Uljinbuk-ro)	Uljin County	Geunnam-myeon	Connected with Susan IS
Uljin Bridge	울진대교		Uljin County	Geunnam-myeon	
Uljin Bridge			Uljin County	Uljin-eup	
Yeonho IS	연호 교차로	Hyeonnaehang-gil	Uljin County	Uljin-eup	
Uljinbukbu IS	울진북부 교차로	Uljinbuk-ro	Uljin County	Uljin-eup	
Jukbyeon IS	죽변 교차로	Prefectural Route 917 (Bonghwang-gil)	Uljin County	Jukbyeon-myeon	Prefectural Route 917 overlap
Hojeong IS	후정 교차로	Maejeong-gil	Uljin County	Jukbyeon-myeon	Prefectural Route 917 overlap
Gomok Bridge	고목교		Uljin County	Buk-myeon	Prefectural Route 917 overlap
Bugu Bridge	부구대교		Uljin County	Buk-myeon	Prefectural Route 917 overlap
Deokgu IS	덕구 교차로	Prefectural Route 917 (Deokguoncheon-gil)	Uljin County	Buk-myeon	Prefectural Route 917 overlap
Taebong Tunnel	태봉터널		Uljin County	Buk-myeon	Right tunnel: Approximately 390m Left tunnel: Approximately 355m
Nagok IS	나곡 교차로	Uljinbuk-ro	Uljin County	Buk-myeon	
Gopo Tunnel	고포터널		Uljin County	Buk-myeon	Right tunnel: Approximately 356m Left tunnel: Approximately 376m Continuation into Gangwon Province

- Motorway section
  - Uljin County Hujeong IS ~ Gopo Tunnel (Donghae-daero)

=== Gangwon Province ===
Name	Hangul name	Connection	Location		Note
Wolcheon Tunnel	월천터널		Samcheok City	Wondeok-eup	Right tunnel: Approximately 145m Left tunnel: Approximately 205m North Gyeongsang Province - Gangwon Province border line
Wolcheon Bridge	월천교		Samcheok City	Wondeok-eup	
Hosan IS (Hosan Intercity Bus Terminal)	호산 교차로 (호산시외버스정류장)	Prefectural Route 416 (Gagokcheon-ro); Samcheok-ro	Samcheok City	Wondeok-eup	
Hosancheon Bridge	호산천교		Samcheok City	Wondeok-eup	
Nogok IS	노곡 교차로	Samcheok-ro	Samcheok City	Wondeok-eup	
Imwon IS	임원 교차로	Samcheok-ro; Imwonbonchon-gil	Samcheok City	Wondeok-eup	
Imwoncheon Bridge	임원천교		Samcheok City	Wondeok-eup	
Sinnam IS (South)	신남 교차로(남)	Samcheok-ro	Samcheok City	Wondeok-eup	
Sinnam IS (North) (Sinnam 2 Bridge)	신남 교차로(북) (신남2교)	Samcheok-ro	Samcheok City	Wondeok-eup	
Jangho Tunnel	장호터널		Samcheok City	Wondeok-eup	Approximately 915m
Jangho Tunnel			Samcheok City	Geundeok-myeon	Approximately 915m
Yonghwa IS	용화 교차로	Samcheok-ro	Samcheok City	Geundeok-myeon	
Gungchon IS	궁촌 교차로	Samcheok-ro	Samcheok City	Geundeok-myeon	
Dongmak IS	동막 교차로	Prefectural Route 427 (Bangjae-ro)	Samcheok City	Geundeok-myeon	
Geundeok IS	근덕 교차로	Samcheok-ro	Samcheok City	Geundeok-myeon	
Geunmak IC	근덕 나들목	Donghae Expressway	Samcheok City	Geundeok-myeon	
Hanchi Bridge	한치교		Samcheok City	Geundeok-myeon	
Hanchi Tunnel	한치터널		Samcheok City	Geundeok-myeon	Right tunnel: Approximately 565m Left tunnel: Approximately 570m
Hanchi Tunnel			Samcheok City	Namyang-dong	Right tunnel: Approximately 565m Left tunnel: Approximately 570m
Obun IS	오분 교차로	Samcheok-ro; Bakgeollam-ro	Samcheok City	Namyang-dong	
Samcheoknam Elementary School	삼척남초등학교		Samcheok City	Namyang-dong	
Sajik IS	사직삼거리	Jungang-ro	Samcheok City	Namyang-dong	
Samcheok Bridge	삼척교		Samcheok City	Namyang-dong	
Samcheok Bridge			Samcheok City	Jeongna-dong	
Samcheok Bridge IS	삼척교사거리	Osipcheon-ro	Samcheok City	Jeongna-dong	
Jeongna IS	정라삼거리	Saecheonnyeondo-ro	Samcheok City	Jeongna-dong	
Jeongsang IS	정상삼거리	Cheokju-ro	Samcheok City	Jeongna-dong	
No name	(이름 없음)	Gyodong-ro; Gwangjin-gil	Samcheok City	Gyo-dong	
Samcheok Stadium	삼척종합운동장		Samcheok City	Gyo-dong	
Samcheok IC Kangwon National University Samcheok Campus	삼척 나들목 강원대학교 삼척캠퍼스	Bonghwang-ro; Dwinnaru-gil	Samcheok City	Gyo-dong	
Galcheon IS	갈천삼거리	Saecheonnyeondo-ro; Uji-gil	Samcheok City	Gyo-dong	
Gongdan IS	공단삼거리	Gongdan 1-ro	Donghae City	Bukpyeong-dong	
Bukpyeong IC	북평 나들목	Daedong-ro	Donghae City	Bukpyeong-dong	
Danbong IS	단봉삼거리	National Route 38; Prefectural Route 28 (Gangwonnambu-ro)	Donghae City	Bukpyeong-dong	
Iwon IS	이원사거리	Jeoncheon-ro	Donghae City	Bukpyeong-dong	
Jeoncheon Bridge	전천교		Donghae City	Bukpyeong-dong	
Jeoncheon Bridge			Donghae City	Buksam-dong	
Bukpyeong IS	북평 교차로	National Route 42 (Seodong-ro)	Donghae City	Buksam-dong	
Naan IS	나안삼거리	Cheongun 1-gil	Donghae City	Buksam-dong	
Hyoga IS	효가사거리	Hyoja-ro	Donghae City	Buksam-dong	
Hanzhong University Entrance	한중대입구	Hyoga-ro	Donghae City	Buksam-dong	
No name	(이름 없음)	Yongjeong-ro	Donghae City	Buksam-dong	
Donghae Freight Terminal	동해화물터미널		Donghae City	Buksam-dong	
Donghae IC	동해 나들목	Donghae Expressway	Donghae City	Buksam-dong	
Playground IS (Donghae Wellbeing Leports Town)	운동장사거리 (동해웰빙레포츠타운)	Donggul-ro	Donghae City	Cheongok-dong	
Jugong4cha IS	주공4차삼거리	Hanseom-ro	Donghae City	Cheongok-dong	
Donghae Sahmyook Elementary School Donghae Sammyook Middle School	동해삼육초등학교 동해삼육중학교		Donghae City	Cheongok-dong	
Cheongok IS	천곡사거리	Cheongok-ro	Donghae City	Cheongok-dong	
Donghae Intercity Bus Terminal	동해시외버스터미널		Donghae City	Cheongok-dong	
Cheongok IS	천곡 교차로	Donghae-daero; Hapyeong-ro	Donghae City	Cheongok-dong	
Donghae Express Bus Terminal	동해고속버스터미널		Donghae City	Bugok-dong	
Bugok Police Station	부곡치안센터	Imhang-ro	Donghae City	Bugok-dong	
Dongho Elementary School	동호초등학교		Donghae City	Balhan-dong	
Mokho Station IS	묵호역사거리	Haean-ro	Donghae City	Balhan-dong	
Balhan-dong Community Center	발한동주민센터		Donghae City	Balhan-dong	
Balhan IS	발한삼거리	Ilchul-ro	Donghae City	Balhan-dong	
Samun IS	사문삼거리	Haean-ro	Donghae City	Balhan-dong	
Mangsang-dong Community Center	망상동주민센터		Donghae City	Balhan-dong	
Changho Elementary School Entrance	창호초교입구	Haemati-gil	Donghae City	Balhan-dong	
Mukho Girls Middle School	묵호여자중학교		Donghae City	Balhan-dong	
Samunjae IS (Mukho Port IS)	사문재 교차로 (묵호항 교차로)	Donghae-daero	Donghae City	Balhan-dong	
Chogu IS	초구 교차로	Donghae-daero	Donghae City	Mangsang-dong	
Mangsang IC	망상 나들목	Donghae Expressway	Donghae City	Mangsang-dong	
Nobong IS	노봉삼거리	Ilchul-ro	Donghae City	Mangsang-dong	
Mangsang Station	망상역		Donghae City	Mangsang-dong	
Mangsang IS	망상삼거리		Donghae City	Mangsang-dong	
Beach IS	해수욕장삼거리	Mangsang Beach	Donghae City	Mangsang-dong	
Dojik Bridge	도직교		Gangneung City	Okgye-myeon	
Dojik Harbor	도직항		Gangneung City	Okgye-myeon	
Okgye Station	옥계역		Gangneung City	Okgye-myeon	
Okgye IS	옥계삼거리		Gangneung City	Okgye-myeon	
Jusu Bridge	주수교		Gangneung City	Okgye-myeon	
Okgye IC	옥계 나들목	Donghae Expressway; Okgye-ro	Gangneung City	Okgye-myeon	
Nakpung IS	낙풍사거리	Pungdong-ro; Heonhwa-ro	Gangneung City	Okgye-myeon	
Donghae 2 Tunnel	동해2터널		Gangneung City	Okgye-myeon	Approximately 449m
Donghae 2 Tunnel			Gangneung City	Gangdong-myeon	Approximately 449m
Cheongdongcheon Bridge	정동천교		Gangneung City	Gangdong-myeon	
Cheongdongjin IS	정동진 교차로	Oidong-gil	Gangneung City	Gangdong-myeon	
Donghae 1ho Tunnel	동해1호터널		Gangneung City	Gangdong-myeon	Approximately 552m
Imgok IS	임곡 교차로	Imgok-ro	Gangneung City	Gangdong-myeon	
Gunseonggang Bridge	군성강교		Gangneung City	Gangdong-myeon	
Anin IS	안인 교차로	Yulgok-ro	Gangneung City	Gangdong-myeon	
Guryong Bridge	구룡교		Gangneung City	Gangnam-dong	
Yusan Bridge	유산교	Yusan-ro; Chilseong-ro	Gangneung City	Gangnam-dong	
(Naegok IS)	(내곡 교차로)	Nambu-ro	Gangneung City	Gangnam-dong	
Gangneung Bridge	강릉대교		Gangneung City	Naegok-dong	
Gangneung Bridge			Gangneung City	Hongje-dong	
Hongje IS (Gangneung City Hall)	홍제 교차로 (강릉시청)	Gangneung-daero	Gangneung City	Hongje-dong	Indirect connected with National Route 35
No name	(이름 없음)	Yucheon-gil	Gangneung City	Gyo-dong	
Solol IS	솔올 교차로	Gyodonggwangjang-ro	Gangneung City	Gyo-dong	
Jibyeon IS (Gangneung-Wonju National University Gangneung Campus)	지변 교차로 (강릉원주대학교 강릉캠퍼스)	Jukheon-gil	Gangneung City	Gyo-dong	
Jukheon IS	죽헌 교차로	Yulgok-ro	Gangneung City	Gyeongpo-dong	
Chuncheon District Prosecutors' Office Gangneung Subprefectural Office Chuncheon District Court Gangneung Branch Gangneung Veterans Affairs	춘천지방검찰청 강릉지청 춘천지방법원 강릉지원 강릉보훈지청		Gangneung City	Gyeongpo-dong	
Jeumeu Overpass	즈므고가교	Saimdang-ro; Anhyeon-ro	Gangneung City	Gyeongpo-dong	
Bangdong IS	방동 교차로	Gwahakdanji-ro	Gangneung City	Sacheon-myeon	
Gangneung Asan Hospital Entrance	강릉아산병원입구	Bangdong-gil	Gangneung City	Sacheon-myeon	
Mino IS	미노 교차로	Mino-gil	Gangneung City	Sacheon-myeon	
Sacheon Bridge	사천교		Gangneung City	Sacheon-myeon	
North Gangneung IC	북강릉 나들목	Donghae Expressway	Gangneung City	Sacheon-myeon	
Yeongok Bridge	연곡교		Gangneung City	Yeongok-myeon	
Bangnae IS	방내 교차로	National Route 6	Gangneung City	Yeongok-myeon	Under construction
Yeongok IS	연곡 교차로	National Route 6 (Jingogae-ro)	Gangneung City	Yeongok-myeon	
Dongdeok IS	동덕 교차로	Yeonju-ro	Gangneung City	Yeongok-myeon	
Jumunjin IC	주문진 입체교차로	Sillicheon-ro	Gangneung City	Jumunjin-eup	
Jumun IS	주문삼거리	Jumunbuk-ro	Gangneung City	Jumunjin-eup	
Hyangho IS	향호삼거리	Chamsaem-gil	Gangneung City	Jumunjin-eup	
South Yangyang IC (Jigyeong Overpass)	남양양 나들목 (지경육교)	Donghae Expressway	Yangyang County	Hyeonnam-myeon	
Wonpo IS	원포삼거리	Hwasangcheon-ro	Yangyang County	Hyeonnam-myeon	
Namae IS	남애삼거리	Maebawi-gil	Yangyang County	Hyeonnam-myeon	
Miryung IS	미륭삼거리	Miryungmaeul-gil	Yangyang County	Hyeonnam-myeon	
Namaehang IS	남애항삼거리	Annamae-gil	Yangyang County	Hyeonnam-myeon	
Gwangjin IS	광진삼거리	Maeho-gil	Yangyang County	Hyeonnam-myeon	
Ingu IS	인구삼거리	Ingujungang-gil	Yangyang County	Hyeonnam-myeon	
Sibyeon-ri IS	시변리삼거리	Saenaru-gil; Ingujungang-gil	Yangyang County	Hyeonnam-myeon	
Dongsanhang IS	동산항삼거리	Dongsankeun-gil	Yangyang County	Hyeonnam-myeon	
Bukbun IS	북분삼거리	Bukjuk-ro	Yangyang County	Hyeonnam-myeon	
Mugunghwa Garden	무궁화동산		Yangyang County	Hyeonbuk-myeon	
Hajodae IS	하조대 교차로	Hajodae 1-gil	Yangyang County	Hyeonbuk-myeon	
Balgam Bridge	발감교	Hajodae 1-gil	Yangyang County	Hyeonbuk-myeon	
Gwangjeong Bridge	광정교		Yangyang County	Hyeonbuk-myeon	
No name	(이름 없음)	Prefectural Route 418 (Songi-ro); Hajodae 1-gil	Yangyang County	Hyeonbuk-myeon	
No name	(이름 없음)	Seonsayujeok-ro	Yangyang County	Sonyang-myeon	
Hajodae IC (Hajodae IC IS)	하조대 나들목 (하조대IC 교차로)	Donghae Expressway	Yangyang County	Sonyang-myeon	
No name	(이름 없음)	Sangchon-ro	Yangyang County	Sonyang-myeon	
Sonyang IC	손양 나들목	Airport Road	Yangyang County	Sonyang-myeon	
Songhyeon IS	송현사거리	National Route 59 (Ansan 1-gil); Dongmyeong-ro	Yangyang County	Sonyang-myeon	
Yangyang Bridge	양양대교		Yangyang County	Sonyang-myeon	
Yangyang Bridge			Yangyang County	Yangyang-eup	
Yangyang IS	양양삼거리	Yangyang-ro	Yangyang County	Yangyang-eup	
Cheonggok IS	청곡 교차로	National Route 44; National Route 56; Prefectural Route 56 (Seorak-ro)	Yangyang County	Yangyang-eup	Prefectural Route 56 overlap
Josan IS	조산사거리	Sarae-ro	Yangyang County	Yangyang-eup	Prefectural Route 56 overlap
Josan IS	조산삼거리	Ilchul-ro	Yangyang County	Yangyang-eup	Prefectural Route 56 overlap
Josan Elementary School	조산초등학교		Yangyang County	Yangyang-eup	Prefectural Route 56 overlap
Provincial Park IS	도립공원삼거리	Ilchul-ro	Yangyang County	Ganghyeon-myeon	Prefectural Route 56 overlap
Naksan Bus Terminal	낙산버스터미널		Yangyang County	Ganghyeon-myeon	Prefectural Route 56 overlap
Naksan IS	낙산사거리	Angol-ro; Ilchul-ro	Yangyang County	Ganghyeon-myeon	Prefectural Route 56 overlap
Seorak Beach Ganghyeon-myeon Office	설악해수욕장 강현면사무소		Yangyang County	Ganghyeon-myeon	Prefectural Route 56 overlap
Airport IS	공항삼거리	Jinmi-ro	Yangyang County	Ganghyeon-myeon	Prefectural Route 56 overlap
Mulchi Bridge	물치교		Yangyang County	Ganghyeon-myeon	Prefectural Route 56 overlap
Ssangcheon Bridge	쌍천교		Yangyang County	Ganghyeon-myeon	Prefectural Route 56 overlap
Ssangcheon Bridge			Sokcho City	Daepo-dong	Prefectural Route 56 overlap
Seorak Sunrise Park (Seoraksan Entrance)	설악해맞이공원 (설악산입구)	Seoraksan-ro	Sokcho City	Daepo-dong	Prefectural Route 56 overlap
Daepo Harbor Daepo Elementary School	대포항 대포초등학교		Sokcho City	Daepo-dong	Prefectural Route 56 overlap
Argo-Industrial Complex IS	농공단지앞사거리	Haeoreum-ro; Nonggongdanji-gil	Sokcho City	Daepo-dong	Prefectural Route 56 overlap
Joyang IS	조양 교차로	Cheongdae-ro	Sokcho City	Joyang-dong	Prefectural Route 56 overlap
Saemaeul IS	새마을사거리	Joyang-ro; Saemaeul-gil	Sokcho City	Joyang-dong	Prefectural Route 56 overlap
Gosok Bus Terminal (Sokcho Gosok Bus Terminal)	고속버스터미널앞 (속초고속버스터미널)	Cheongho-ro; Haeoreum-ro	Sokcho City	Joyang-dong	Prefectural Route 56 overlap
No name	(이름 없음)	Seorakgeumgangdaegyo-ro	Sokcho City	Joyang-dong	Prefectural Route 56 overlap
Expo Entrance IS	엑스포장입구삼거리	Expo-ro	Sokcho City	Joyang-dong	Prefectural Route 56 overlap
Cheongcho Bridge	청초교		Sokcho City	Joyang-dong	Prefectural Route 56 overlap
Cheongcho Bridge			Sokcho City	Gyo-dong	Prefectural Route 56 overlap
Cheongcho Bridge IS	청초교사거리	Oncheon-ro	Sokcho City	Gyo-dong	Prefectural Route 56 overlap
Sokcho Fire Station	속초소방서		Sokcho City	Gyo-dong	Prefectural Route 56 overlap
Gyodong IS	교동삼거리	Jungang-ro	Sokcho City	Gyo-dong	Prefectural Route 56 overlap
Mancheon IS	만천사거리	Subok-ro	Sokcho City	Gyo-dong	Prefectural Route 56 overlap
Mancheon IS	만천삼거리	Cheongdae-ro	Sokcho City	Gyo-dong	Prefectural Route 56 overlap
Gyodong Underpass IS (Gyodong Underpass)	교동지하차도사거리 (교동지하차도)	Prefectural Route 56 (Misiryeong-ro)	Sokcho City	Gyo-dong	Prefectural Route 56 overlap
Yongchon 1 Bridge	용촌1교		Goseong County	Toseong-myeon	
Yongchon IS (Yongchon Overpass)	용촌삼거리 (용촌육교)	Jaembeoridong-ro; Jungang-ro	Goseong County	Toseong-myeon	
Bongpo IS	봉포삼거리	Toseong-ro	Goseong County	Toseong-myeon	
Bongpo Underpass	봉포지하차도	Bongpo 5-gil	Goseong County	Toseong-myeon	
Bongpo Bridge (Kyungdong University Seorak URIA Campus)	봉포교 (경동대학교 설악URIA캠퍼스)	Bongpo 4-gil	Goseong County	Toseong-myeon	
Goseong Jesaeng Hospital	고성제생병원		Goseong County	Toseong-myeon	
Cheonjin IS	천진사거리	Goseong-daero; Toseong-ro; Cheonjinhaebyeon-gil	Goseong County	Toseong-myeon	
Cheonggan IS	청간삼거리	Ayajinhaebyeon-gil; Cheonggangol-gil	Goseong County	Toseong-myeon	
Ayajin IS	아야진삼거리	Ayajin-gil; Jindong-gil	Goseong County	Toseong-myeon	
Gyoam IS	교암사거리	Gyoam-gil; Hwawon-gil	Goseong County	Toseong-myeon	
Munam IS	문암삼거리	Mureungdowon-ro	Goseong County	Jugwang-myeon	
Munam Bridge	문암교		Goseong County	Jugwang-myeon	
Baekdo IS	백도 교차로	Unbongsan-ro; Munamhang-gil	Goseong County	Jugwang-myeon	
Oho IS (Bongsudae Beach)	오호 교차로 (봉수대해수욕장)	Simcheungsu-gil	Goseong County	Jugwang-myeon	
Jukwang IS	죽왕 교차로	Songjiho-ro	Goseong County	Jugwang-myeon	
Songjiho IS	송지호 교차로	Simcheungsu-gil	Goseong County	Jugwang-myeon	
Gonghyeonjin IS	공현진 교차로	Gonghyeonjin-gil	Goseong County	Jugwang-myeon	
Gajin IS	가진 교차로	Gajinhaebyeon-gil; Jjanggogae-gil	Goseong County	Jugwang-myeon	
Namcheon Bridge	남천교		Goseong County	Jugwang-myeon	
Namcheon Bridge			Goseong County	Ganseong-eup	
(Underpass)	(지하차도)	Tapdong-gil	Goseong County	Ganseong-eup	
Ganseong IS	간성 교차로	Ganseong-ro	Goseong County	Ganseong-eup	
Sangri IS	상리 교차로	National Route 46 (Ganseong-ro)	Goseong County	Ganseong-eup	Connected with Bukcheon IS
Bukcheon 1 Bridge	북천1교		Goseong County	Ganseong-eup	
Bukcheon 1 Bridge			Goseong County	Geojin-eup	
Daedae IS	대대 교차로	Jinburyeong-ro	Goseong County	Geojin-eup	
Songjuk IS	송죽 교차로	Jinburyeong-ro	Goseong County	Geojin-eup	
Ojeong IS	오정 교차로	Songjuk 2-gil	Goseong County	Geojin-eup	
Banam Harbor	반암항		Goseong County	Geojin-eup	
Jasan IS	자산삼거리	Geotanjin-ro	Goseong County	Geojin-eup	
No name	(이름 없음)	Geopyeong-ro; Geonbongsa-ro	Goseong County	Geojin-eup	
No name	(이름 없음)	Hwajinpo-gil	Goseong County	Geojin-eup	
(Daejin Middle and High School)	(대진중고등학교입구)	Hwajinpo-gil	Goseong County	Hyeonnae-myeon	
Chodo IS	초도삼거리	Hannaru-ro	Goseong County	Hyeonnae-myeon	
Daejin Intercity Bus Terminal	대진시외버스터미널		Goseong County	Hyeonnae-myeon	
No name	(이름 없음)	Hannaru-ro	Goseong County	Hyeonnae-myeon	
Machajin Beach	마차진해수욕장		Goseong County	Hyeonnae-myeon	
Unification Observatory Entrance	통일전망대 출입신고소		Goseong County	Hyeonnae-myeon	
Myeongpa Clinic Myeongpa Elementary School	명파보건진료소 명파초등학교		Goseong County	Hyeonnae-myeon	
Myeongpa-ri	명파리		Goseong County	Hyeonnae-myeon	Civilian Control Zone (CCZ) section
Sacheon 2 IS	사천2 교차로		Goseong County	Hyeonnae-myeon	Civilian Control Zone (CCZ) section
Goseong Customs DMZ Museum	고성세관; DMZ박물관		Goseong County	Hyeonnae-myeon	Civilian Control Zone (CCZ) section
Unification Observatory	통일전망대		Goseong County	Hyeonnae-myeon	Civilian Control Zone (CCZ) section
Continuation into North Korea

- Motorway section
  - Samcheok Wolcheon Tunnel ~ Obun IS (Donghae-daero)
