= 2017 Pohang earthquake =

Earthquake in South Korea

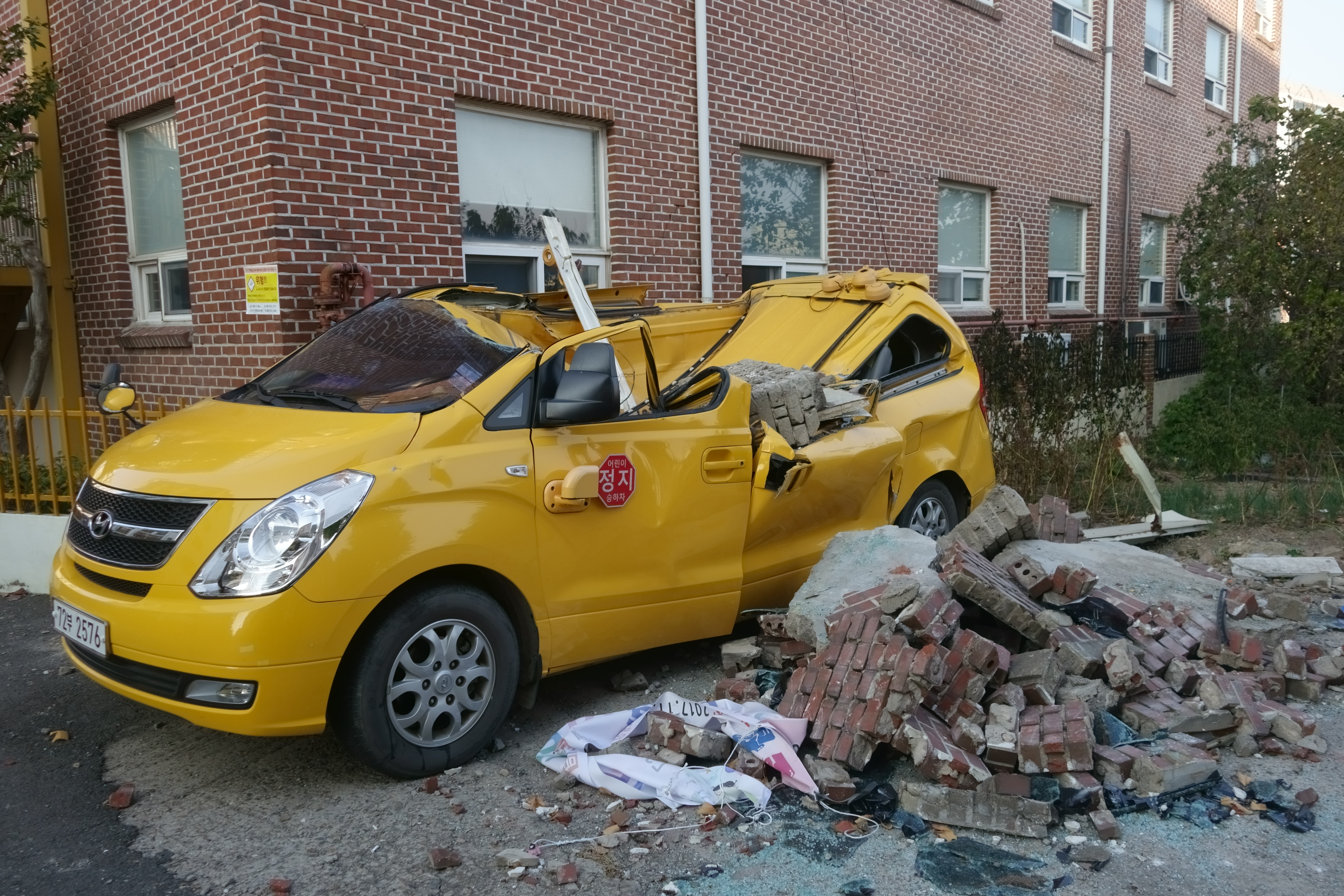

- Location within South Korea
- UTC time: 2017-11-15 05:29:31
- ISC event: 611461139
- USGS-ANSS: ComCat
- Local date: 15 November 2017
- Local time: 14:29:31 KST
- Magnitude: M_{w}^{(USGS)} 5.5; M_{L}^{(KMA)} 5.4
- Depth: 7 km
- Epicenter: 36.12°N 129.36°E
- Type: Reverse-Thrust
- Areas affected: Pohang, Ulsan, Daegu
- Max. intensity: MMI VII (Very strong)
- Peak acceleration: 0.58 g
- Tsunami: No
- Foreshocks: M 2.6 (14:22:32 KST); M 2.2 (14:22:44 KST)
- Casualties: 82 injured

Water injection well of an Enhanced geothermal system (EGS) might have triggered the earthquake

The 2017 Pohang earthquake, measuring magnitude 5.4 on the local magnitude scale (5.5 M_{w}), struck Heunghae, Pohang, South Korea on November 15, 2017, and the hypocenter was 7 km below the surface. It is tied with the 2016 Gyeongju earthquake as the country's strongest earthquake in modern history since seismological observations started in Korea in 1978, and the most destructive ever recorded with "an estimated 300 billion won (US$290 million) in damage.". It also recorded a VII intensity on the Modified Mercalli intensity scale, making it the second largest earthquake in recorded history in Korea.

== Tectonic setting ==
Although the Korean Peninsula is part of the Eurasian plate, until the early Tertiary era (about 30 million years ago), it was made up of continental magmatic arcs along a plate border. With the coetaneous formation of smaller-scale basins, such as the Pohang, and the opening of the East Sea (or Japan Sea) as a back-arc basin in the early to middle Tertiary (~30 to 15 million years ago), north-northeast-striking strike-slip faults and NNE- to NE-striking normal faults developed primarily in southeastern Korea and adjacent offshore areas. The present compressional regime has caused some of these faults to reactivate as thrust and strike-slip faults. Throughout the southern Korean Peninsula, the axes of compression identified by focal mechanism solutions show modest plunges to the ENE. With low rates of deformation and seismicity and a lengthy recurrence interval between destructive earthquakes, Korea's modern instrumental seismicity (since 1978) is a typical example of a stable continental zone.

== Main earthquake ==
The earthquake, along with several aftershocks, caused significant infrastructure damage in the southern port city of Pohang. At least 82 people were injured in the earthquake, including 15 people who were hospitalized. About 1,124 people stayed in temporary shelters after they had to leave their homes.

Aftershocks of the earthquake

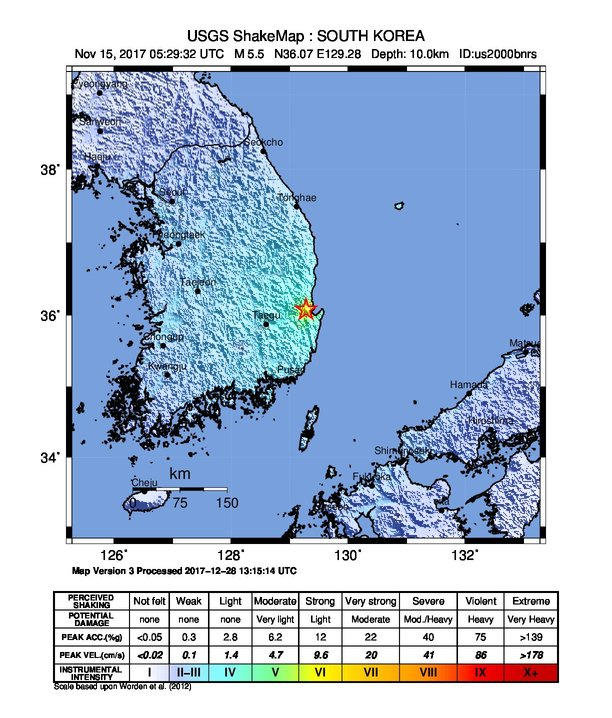
Shakemap for the earthquake

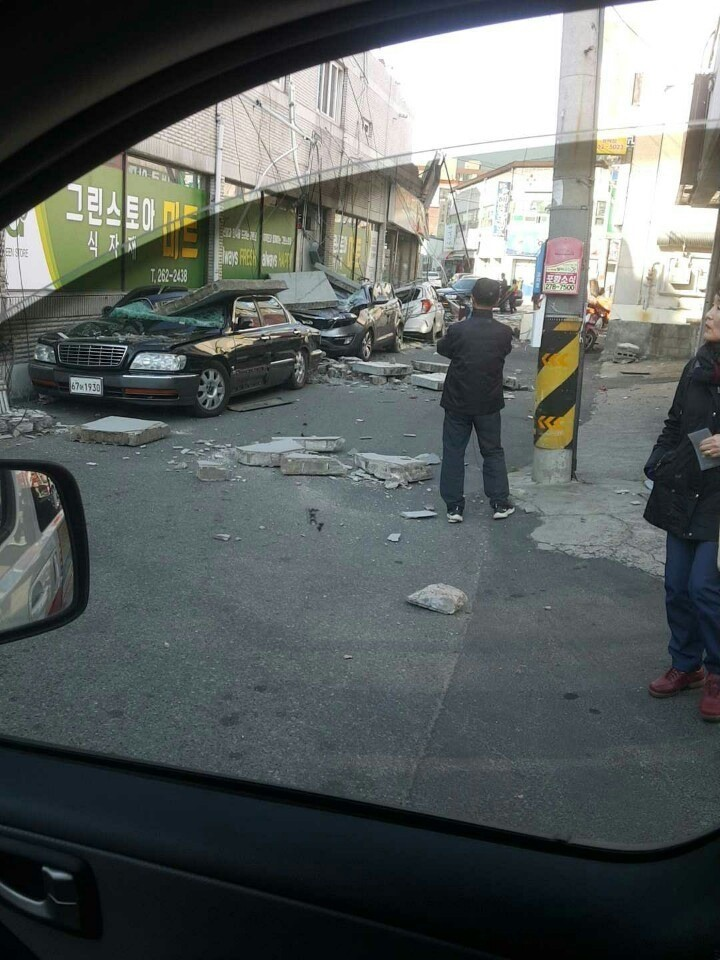
Crumbled walls piled on damaged cars in Pohang, South Korea

== Earthquake development ==
There were two main foreshocks for the earthquake which happened 7 km north and northwest of Buk-gu Pohang respectively. The mainshock occurred approximately 29 minutes and 31 seconds after the initial foreshock was detected. Several aftershocks were also detected following the main earthquake.

== Main fault ==
A previously unmapped fault that seems to be the opposite of the Gokgang fault system was reactivated by the seismic series, according to the three-dimensional distribution of aftershocks and the focal mechanism solutions of the bigger aftershocks that occurred right after the main events. The focal mechanism of the earthquake was determined to be a strike slip fault with some thrust elements, indicating a complicated faulting sequence. The estimated size of the Pohang earthquake's seismic fault is 4–5 km broad and 7–8 km long, based on the distribution of aftershocks that happened on the main fault plane. This earthquake is known as a "runaway earthquake", where a chain reaction occurs: the slipping generates heat and more slipping occurs. The fault ruptured in 3 distinct steps, all occurring within 6 seconds, "In each step, the seismic moment was released as approximately 6%, 59%, and 35%, respectively."

== Cause ==
Following the earthquake, it was determined that the earthquake was a "runaway" earthquake triggered by critical‐state fault as a result of fluid injection due to geothermal projects in the area. An enhanced geothermal system (EGS) was located a mere 600 meters from the epicenter of the earthquake and part of the development included injection of high pressure fluid which can cause stress changes leading to earthquakes. Although the magnitude of the earthquake was much higher than earthquakes expected with EGS, the Korean Government Commission determined that the earthquake was a result of fluid injection too. Further investigations found that the earthquake was not directly caused by fluid injection but rather resulted from a self-sustaining rupture process that released a significant amount of energy through tectonic loading on the fault zone that was reactivated by fluid injection.

== Aftershocks ==
A 4.6 magnitude earthquake on February 10, 2018, was detected and was determined to be an aftershock of the main earthquake. The aftershock occurred in the Southeast part of the fault unlike the mainshock which happened in the Northeast portion of the fault. Long term monitoring of the fault has determined that the frequency of aftershocks has decreased following the initial event. However, about 10 aftershocks associated with the original earthquake still happen every month, indicating that the initial earthquake may have changed the seismological characteristics of the area. It was also determined that the number of aftershocks happening along the fault surface where the main earthquake also decreased, with most of them being concentrated along the rupture tips whilst trending predominantly in a northeast–southwest direction.

== Result ==
According to an initial assessment by the Ministry of the Interior and Safety, the earthquake damaged 2,165 private properties, including 1,988 private houses. Of those, 52 homes suffered severe damage and 157 suffered serious damage.

Damage was also reported at 227 schools across the region, 107 of them in Pohang, 44 in Ulsan and 26 in Daegu. Furthermore, damage was reported at 79 public offices and parks, 23 port facilities, 7 roads, 90 shops, 77 factories, and 11 bridges. Closer to the coast in Pohang, exterior walls of a building at Handong University had collapsed.

Nearly 20,000 people, including soldiers, were mobilized to help clear debris and to assist in restoration works. More than 80 percent of damaged properties were restored within 4 days of the initial earthquake.

A seismograph installed nearby epicenter of this earthquake measured peak ground acceleration (PGA) of 0.58 g; Due to Pohang's poor subsoil area, seismic wave amplified while passing through, making the damage somewhat heavier than the 5.8 magnitude 2016 Gyeongju earthquake. 0.58 g of PGA is about equivalent to MMI Intensity VIII to IX.

The mainly caused fault of this earthquake was under debate; initially Yangsan Fault was thought to be the cause of this earthquake, however days later Korea Meteorological Administration (KMA) announced that Jangsa fault – a branch fault of Yangsan fault – is main cause of the earthquake. However, the Korea Institute of Geoscience and Mineral Resources (KIGAM) analyzed that the unknown fault caused this earthquake. Water injection in the ground by the geothermal plant in Pohang might have also triggered the earthquake.

The College Scholastic Ability Test was delayed by one week both to change testing sites and allow nerves a chance to relax from the quake.

== Social fallout ==
The Pohang local government requested in 2019 that the National Assembly and the central government work closely together to draft special legislation that identifies and compensates the victims of the 2017 Pohang earthquake, as more and more citizens are joining the lawsuits. In March 2024, an article published by one of Korea's largest business newspapers reported that 96% of the Pohang population had joined the lawsuit. All of the Pohang residents in the suit are expected to receive 3 million won each, or about US$2100, by order of the Daegu district court. The total amount of compensation could reach 2 trillion won.

By 2019, a large number of the residents displaced by the earthquake were still living in tents in gymnasiums, because some buildings were still considered unstable.

Nearly 80% of Pohang residents, according to Mayor Lee Gang-deok, complain about mental health issues, and 42% are currently dealing with post-traumatic stress disorder. As a result, the special law is intended to fully treat the emotional and bodily pain caused by the earthquake. Although bills have been presented for the National Assembly's consideration, discussions over the specifics of the legislation are still underway.

== See also ==
- 2016 Gyeongju earthquake
- List of earthquakes in 2017
- List of earthquakes in South Korea
