= 779 Gyeongju earthquake =

- Location within South Korea
- Magnitude: 6.7–7.0 M_{w}
- Epicenter: 35.8°N 129.2°E
- Areas affected: Silla (present-day South Korea)
- Max. intensity: MMI IX (Violent)
- Casualties: 100+ dead

The 779 Gyeongju earthquake struck present-day South Korea during the Silla kingdom in March 779 AD. It one of the deadliest earthquake in Korean history, and one of the largest earthquake to occur inland on the Korean Peninsula between the years 2 AD and 1904. The earthquake had an estimated moment magnitude of 6.7 to 7.0, and affected present-day North Gyeongsang Province. The maximum Modified Mercalli intensity was assigned IX. More than 100 people died and many houses collapsed. This earthquake occurred close to the epicenter of the 2016 Gyeongju earthquake.

== See also ==
- List of earthquakes in South Korea
- List of historical earthquakes
- 2016 Gyeongju earthquake
