= National Route 88 (South Korea) =

Road in South Korea

National Route 88
- 국도 제88호선

Route information
- Length: 38.5 km (23.9 mi)
- Existed: 25 July 2001–present

Major junctions
- West end: Yeongyang County, North Gyeongsang Province
- East end: Uljin County, North Gyeongsang Province

Location
- Country: South Korea

Highway system
- Highway systems of South Korea; Expressways; National; Local

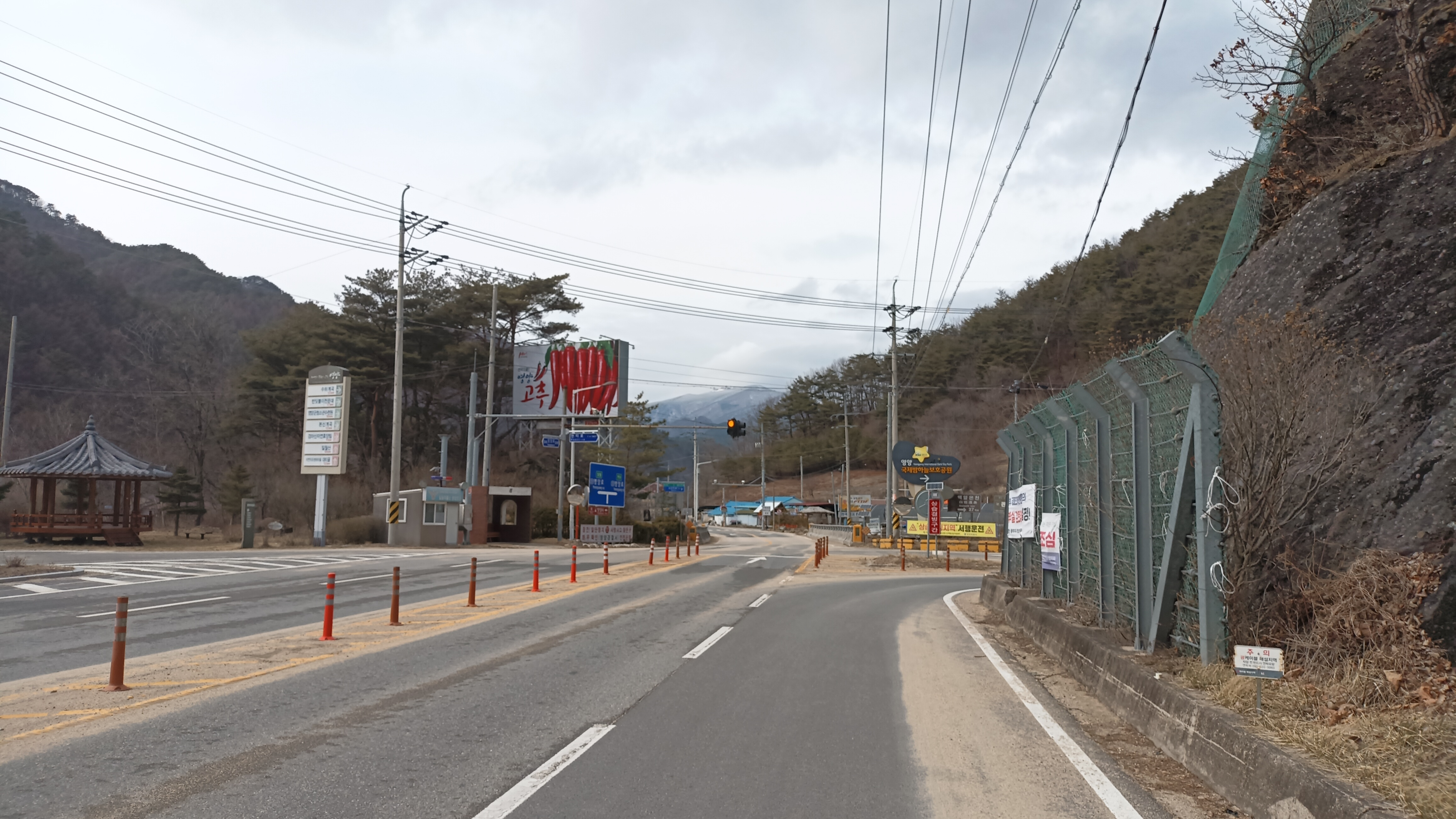
Munam IS

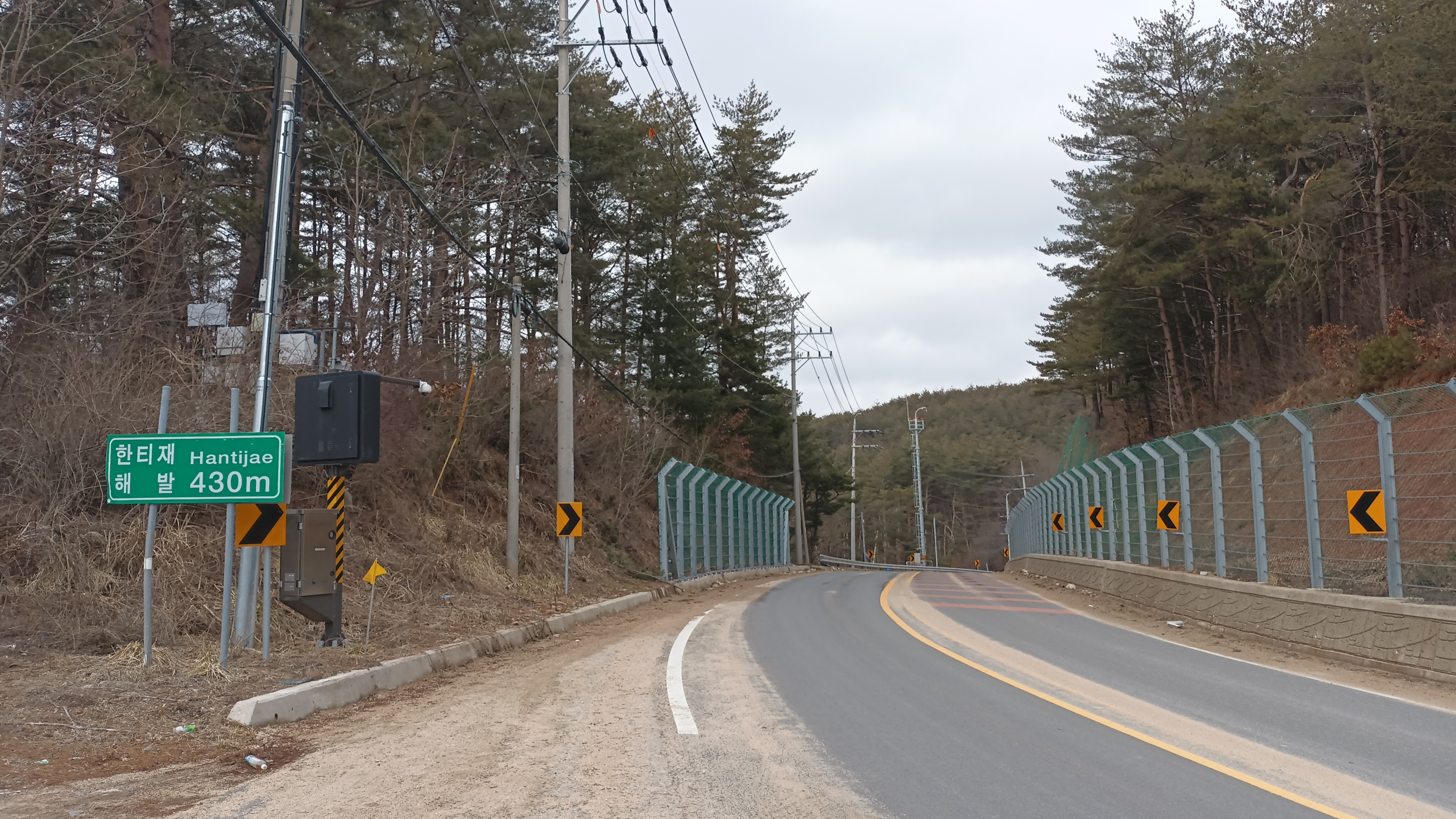
Hanti hill

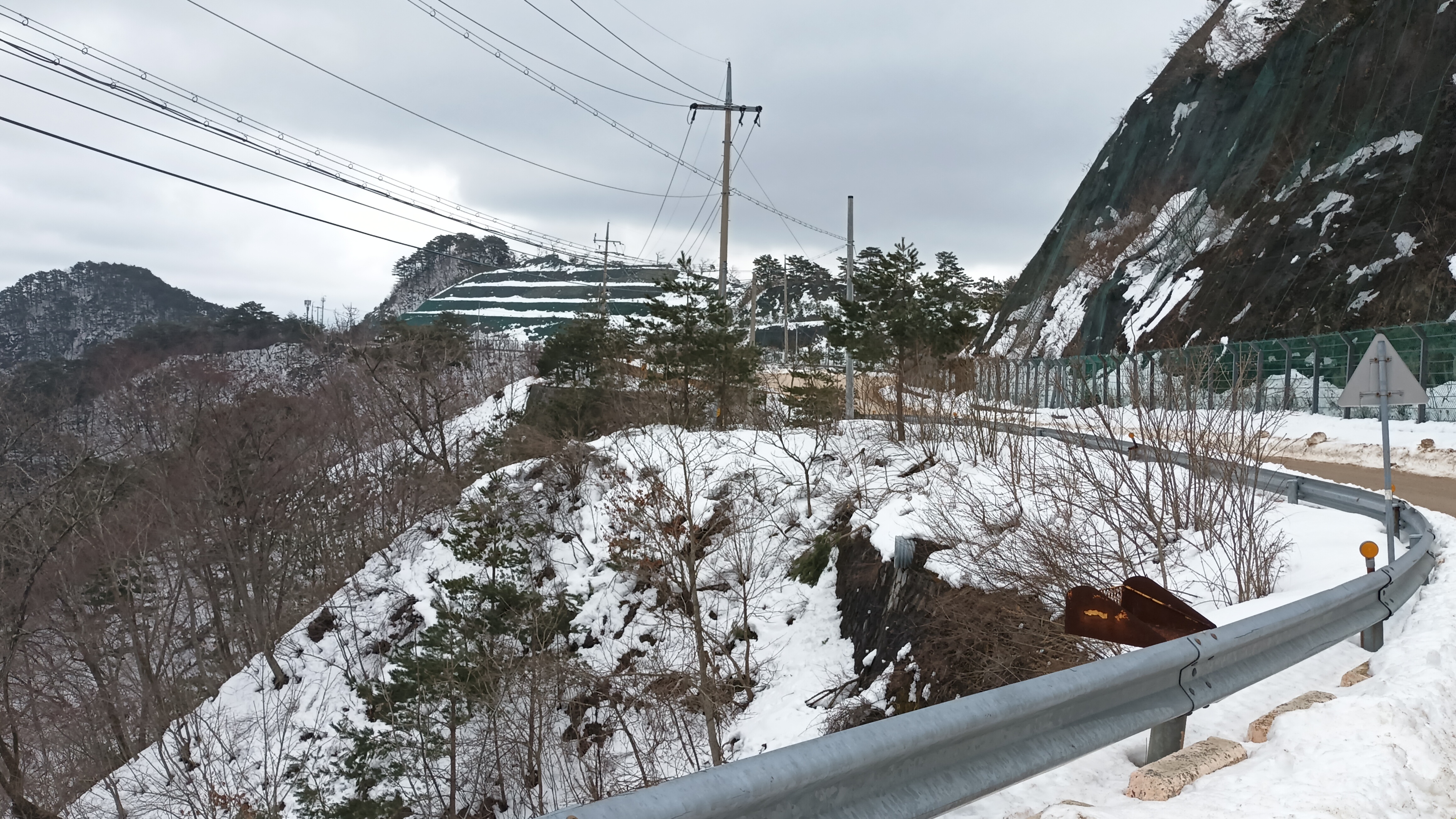
Guju hill

National Route 88 is a national highway in South Korea connecting Yeongyang County to Uljin County. It was established on 25 July 2001.

== Main stopovers ==
North Gyeongsang Province

- Yeongyang County - Uljin County

== Major intersections ==
- (■): Motorway

IS: Intersection, IC: Interchange

=== North Gyeongsang Province ===
| Name | Hangul name | Connection | Location | | Note |
Connected directly with Prefectural Route 88
| Munam IS | 문암삼거리 | National Route 31; Prefectural Route 88 (Yeongyang-ro) | Yeongyang County | Ilwol-myeon | Terminus |
| Hanti hill (430m) | 한티재 | | Yeongyang County | Subi-myeon | |
| Subi-myeon Welfare Center Subi Elementary School | 수비면행정복지센터 수비초등학교 | | Yeongyang County | Subi-myeon | |
| Balri IS | 발리삼거리 | Prefectural Route 917 (Nakdongjeongmaek-ro) | Yeongyang County | Subi-myeon | |
| Bonsin Valley | 본신계곡 | Bonsin-ro | Yeongyang County | Subi-myeon | |
| Guju hill (550m) | 구주령 | | Yeongyang County | Subi-myeon | |
| Guju hill (550m) | | | Uljin County | Onjeong-myeon | |
| Seongu-ri | 선구리 | Prefectural Route 69 (Onmae-ro) | Uljin County | Onjeong-myeon | |
| Onjeong Elementary School Seonmi Branch School (Closed) | 온정초등학교 선미분교(폐교) | | Uljin County | Onjeong-myeon | |
| Seongu Bridge | 선구교 | Naeseonmi-gil | Uljin County | Onjeong-myeon | |
| Deoti hill | 더티재 | | Uljin County | Onjeong-myeon | |
| Baekam Spa (Sotae Roundabout) | 백암온천 (소태 회전교차로) | Sotae-ro; Oncheon-ro | Uljin County | Onjeong-myeon | |
| Onjeong Bus Terminal | 온정종합터미널 | | Uljin County | Onjeong-myeon | |
| (Sotae 2-ri) | (소태2리) | Prefectural Route 69 (Onjeong-ro) | Uljin County | Onjeong-myeon | |
| Onjeong Bridge | 온정교 | Sotaehaam-gil | Uljin County | Onjeong-myeon | |
| (Geumcheon 1-ri) | (금천1리) | Samdeok-ro | Uljin County | Onjeong-myeon | |
| Gwangpung 2 Bridge Gwangpung 1 Bridge | 광풍2교 광풍1교 | | Uljin County | Onjeong-myeon | |
| Pyeonghae Volunteer Fire Department | 평해전담의용소방대 | Pyeonghae-ro | Uljin County | Pyeonghae-eup | |
| Pyeonghae IS | 평해삼거리 | Wolsongjeong-ro | Uljin County | Pyeonghae-eup | |
| Pyeonghae IS | 평해 교차로 | National Route 7 (Donghae-daero) | Uljin County | Pyeonghae-eup | Terminus |
