= 1681 Yangyang earthquake =

Earthquake in South Korea

- Location within South Korea
- Local date: 12 June 1681
- Magnitude: M_{w}7.5
- Epicenter: 37.9°N 128.5°E
- Areas affected: South Korea
- Max. intensity: JMA 7 - MMI IX (Violent)
- Casualties: 1 dead

The 1681 Yangyang earthquake which occurred on 12 June is one of the largest earthquake to affect the Korean Peninsula. This earthquake with an estimated moment magnitude of 7.5 occurred during the Joseon dynasty with an epicenter off the east coast of present-day South Korea.

== Impact ==
The earthquake's effects were recorded in the Veritable Records of the Joseon Dynasty. It caused widespread damage in Kangwon Province; many homes built with mud walls collapsed and their roof tiles fell. The Sinheungsa temple on Seoraksan was also destroyed. Rockfalls were reported in the areas of Pyeongchang and Jeongseon. An investigation of rockfall deposits at Seoraksan suggest they formed in recent times rather than prehistoric and may have been caused by the earthquake. Descriptions of the sea being "swept" at Yangyang, near the coast, were interpreted as a seaquake and suggested an epicenter offshore. The journal documented the withdrawal of the sea at the coast by 50 to 60 pace, and in some areas, up to 100 pace. These have been interpreted as descriptions of a tsunami backwash and further supported a seismic source offshore. The only report of a person killed was from Seoul where an individual died after falling off a horse during the earthquake.

== Geology ==
Based on the distribution of damage reports and assessing their intensity on the JMA seismic intensity scale, a moment magnitude of 7.5 was estimated. Seismic intensity level 5 or higher was recorded along the coast in a north–south trend for 200 km (120 mi) while the maximum intensity was 7. There were 3 foreshocks recorded 14 days before the mainshock and 6 damaging aftershocks until February 1682.

== See also ==
- List of earthquakes in South Korea
