= Yangsan Fault =

Seismic fault in southeastern Korea

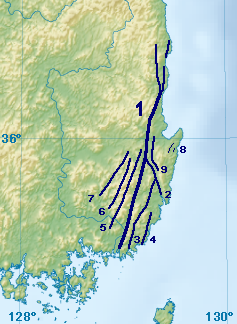
- 1 is Yangsan Fault.

Korean name
- Hangul: 양산 단층
- Hanja: 梁山斷層
- RR: Yangsan dancheung
- MR: Yangsan tanch'ŭng

Yangsan Fault is a seismic fault in southeastern Korea which was responsible for the 5.7 M_{w} Gyeongju earthquake in 2016. It is located between Yeongdeok County and Busan with Yangsan.
