= Anguksa (Pohang) =

Buddhist temple in Pohang, South Korea

Anguk Temple

Religion
- Affiliation: Buddhism

Location
- Location: Namgye-ri, Gigye-myeon, Buk-gu, Pohang, Gyeongsangbuk-do
- Country: South Korea
- Interactive map of Anguk Temple
- Coordinates: 36.09743°N 129.12696°E

Architecture
- Elevation: 256 m (840 ft)

Korean name
- Hangul: 안국사
- Hanja: 安國寺
- RR: Anguksa
- MR: An'guksa

Alternate name
- Hangul: 하안국사
- Hanja: 下安國寺
- RR: Haanguksa
- MR: Haan'guksa

Anguksa (Korean: 안국사), Haanguksa or Lower Anguk Temple is a temple located in Pohang, Gyeongsangbuk-do, South Korea.
