= Nam District, Pohang =

Coordinates: 36.01°N 129.36°E

Nam-gu
- Non-autonomous District
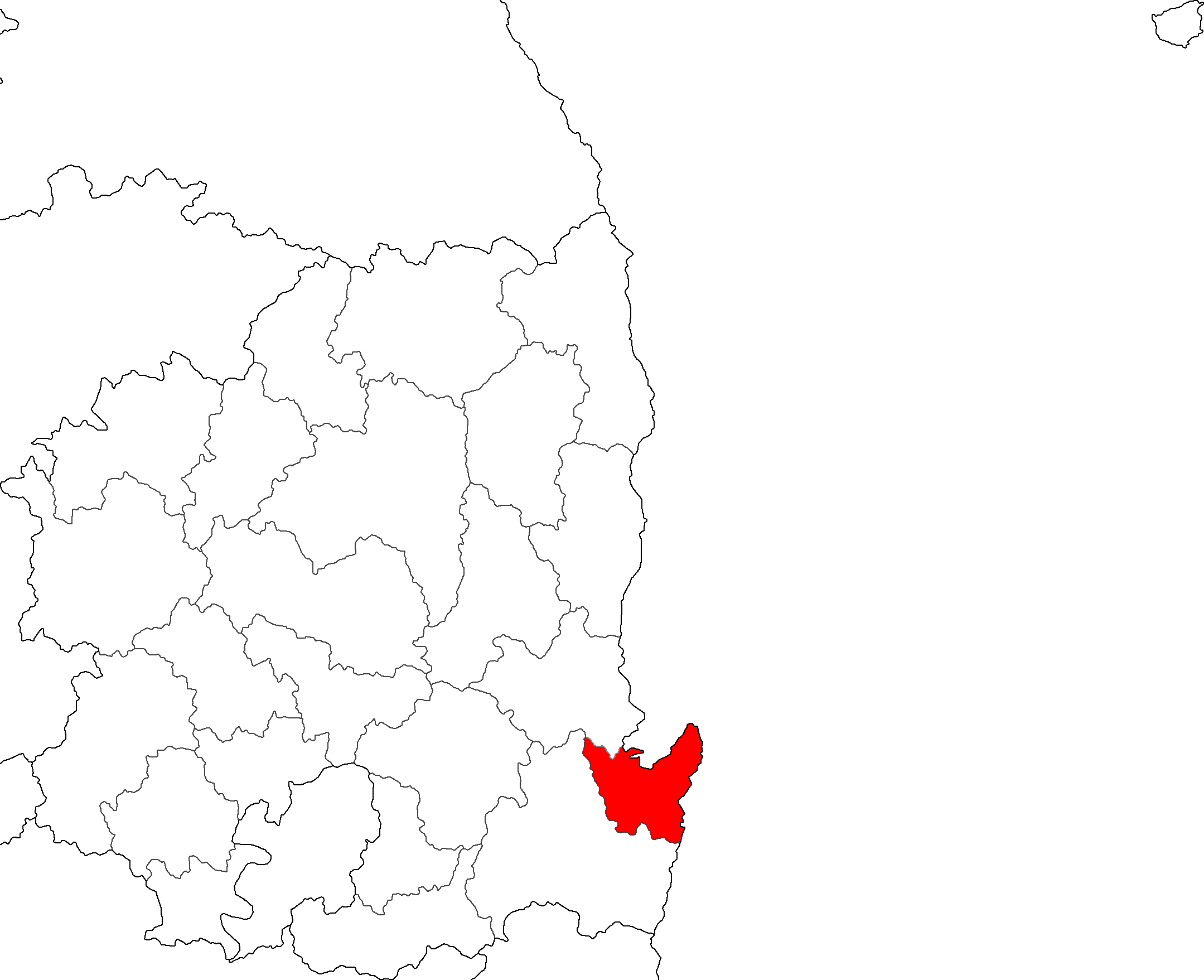
- Country: South Korea
- Region: Yeongnam
- Province: North Gyeongsang
- City: Pohang
- Administrative divisions: 7 dong, 3 eup, 4 myeon

Area
  - Total: 393.02 km^{2} (151.75 sq mi)

Population (2012)
  - Total: 253,670
  - Density: 645/km^{2} (1,670/sq mi)
  - Dialect: Gyeongsang
- Website: namgu.ipohang.org

Korean name
- Hangul: 남구
- Hanja: 南區
- RR: Nam-gu
- MR: Nam-gu

Nam District (Korean: 남구; lit. 'South District') is a non-autonomous district of Pohang, North Gyeongsang Province, South Korea. It is one of two districts in the city, the other being Buk District ("North District").

== Administrative divisions ==
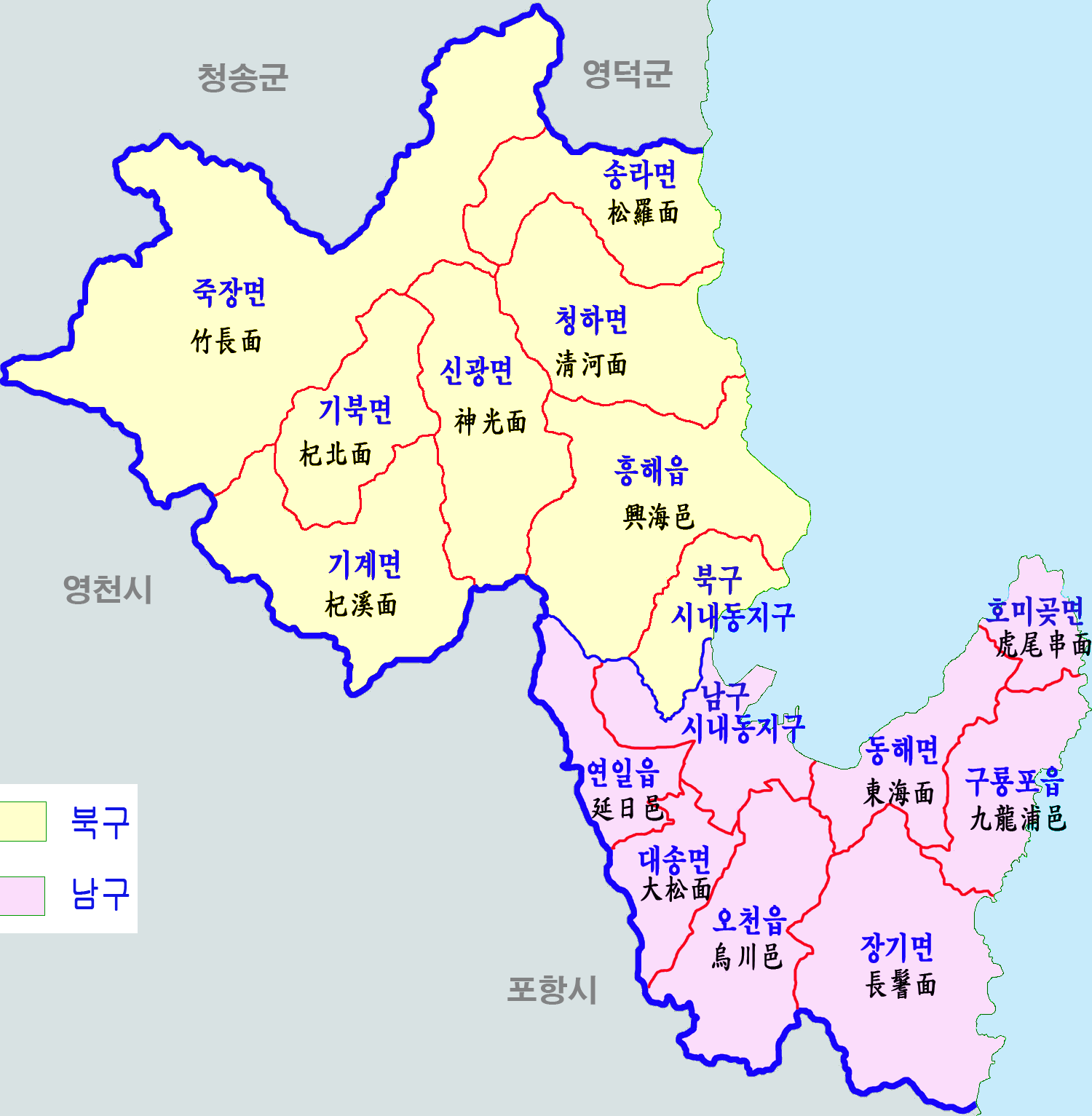
Pohang eup/myeon/dong map in Korean. Yellow is Buk-gu and Purple is Nam-gu.

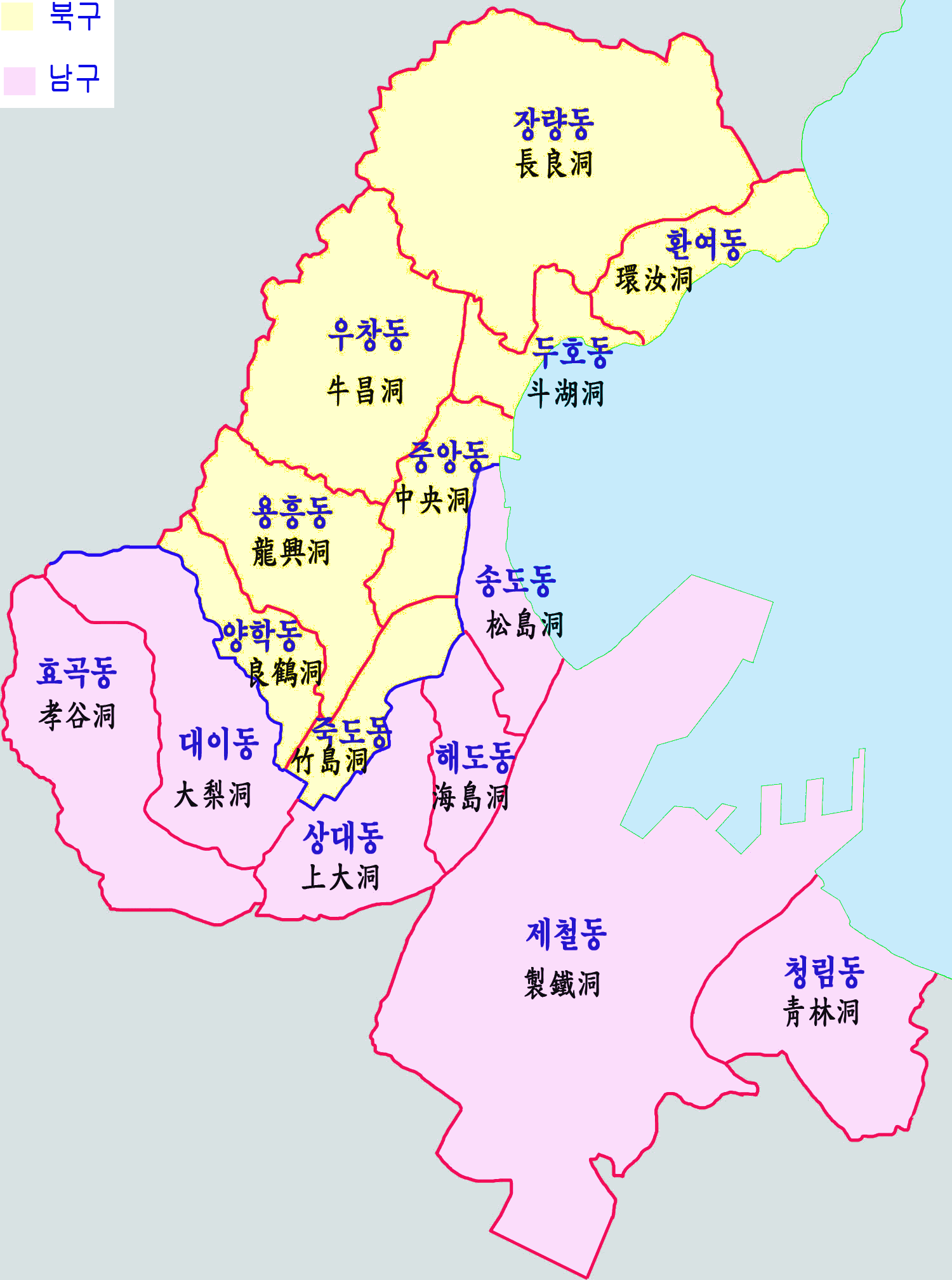
Inset map. Yellow is Buk-gu and Purple is Nam-gu.

Nam-gu is divided into 3 towns (eup), 4 townships (myeon), and 7 neighbourhoods (dong).

	Hangul	Hanja
Guryongpo-eup	구룡포읍	九龍浦邑
Yeonil-eup	연일읍	延日邑
Ocheon-eup	오천읍	烏川邑
Daesong-myeon	대송면	大松面
Donghae-myeon	동해면	東海面
Janggi-myeon	장기면	長鬐面
Homigot-myeon	호미곶면	虎尾串面
Sangdae-dong	상대동	上大洞
Haedo-dong	해도동	海島洞
Songdo-dong	송도동	松島洞
Cheongnim-dong	청림동	靑林洞
Jecheol-dong	제철동	製鐵洞
Hyogok-dong	효곡동	孝谷洞
Daei-dong	대이동	大梨洞

Each town and township are then further divided into numerous villages (ri).

eup/myeon/dong	ri	Hangeul	Hanja
Guryongpo-eup	Guryongpo-ri	구룡포리	九龍浦里
Guryongpo-eup	Samjeong-ri	삼정리	三政里
Guryongpo-eup	Seokbyeong-ri	석병리	石屛里
Guryongpo-eup	Nultae-ri	눌태리	訥台里
Guryongpo-eup	Hudong-ri	후동리	厚洞里
Guryongpo-eup	Byeongpo-ri	병포리	柄浦里
Guryongpo-eup	Hajeong-ri	하정리	河亭里
Guryongpo-eup	Janggil-ri	장길리	長吉里
Guryongpo-eup	Gupyeong-ri	평리	邱坪里
Guryongpo-eup	Seongdong-ri	성동리	城洞里
Yeonil-eup	Ocheon-ri	오천리	烏川里
Yeonil-eup	Saengji-ri	생지리	生旨里
Yeonil-eup	Goejeong-ri	괴정리	槐亭里
Yeonil-eup	Dongmun-ri	동문리	東門里
Yeonil-eup	Inju-ri	인주리	絪珠里
Yeonil-eup	Taekjeon-ri	택전리	宅前里
Yeonil-eup	Jungdan-ri	중단리	中丹里
Yeonil-eup	Jungmyeong-ri	중명리	中明里
Yeonil-eup	Ubok-ri	우복리	牛伏里
Yeonil-eup	Yugang-ri	유강리	柳江里
Yeonil-eup	Jamyeong-ri	자명리	自明里
Yeonil-eup	Hakjeon-ri	학전리	鶴田里
Yeonil-eup	Daljeon-ri	달전리	達田里
Ocheon-eup	Mundeok-ri	문덕리	文德里
Ocheon-eup	Gwangmyeong-ri	광명리	光明里
Ocheon-eup	Segye-ri	세계리	世界里
Ocheon-eup	Yongdeok-ri	용덕리	龍德里
Ocheon-eup	Won-ri	원리	院里
Ocheon-eup	Gujeong-ri	구정리	舊政里
Ocheon-eup	Yongsan-ri	용산리	龍山里
Ocheon-eup	Munchung-ri	문충리	文忠里
Ocheon-eup	Hangsa-ri	항사리	恒沙里
Ocheon-eup	Galpyeong-ri	갈평리	葛坪里
Ocheon-eup	Jinjeon-ri	진전리	陳田里
Daesong-myeon	Namseong-ri	남성리	南城里
Daesong-myeon	Jenae-ri	제내리	堤內里
Daesong-myeon	Songdong-ri	송동리	松洞里
Daesong-myeon	Ongmyeong-ri	옥명리	玉明里
Daesong-myeon	Gongsu-ri	공수리	公須里
Daesong-myeon	Jangdong-ri	장동리	長洞里
Daesong-myeon	Honggye-ri	홍계리	洪溪里
Daesong-myeon	Daegak-ri	대각리	大覺里
Daesong-myeon	Sanyeo-ri	산여리	山余里

== See also ==
- Buk District, Pohang
