= 2016 Gyeongju earthquake =

Earthquake in South Korea

Coordinates: 35.7690°N 129.2270°E

- Magnitude of 2016 Gyeongju earthquake

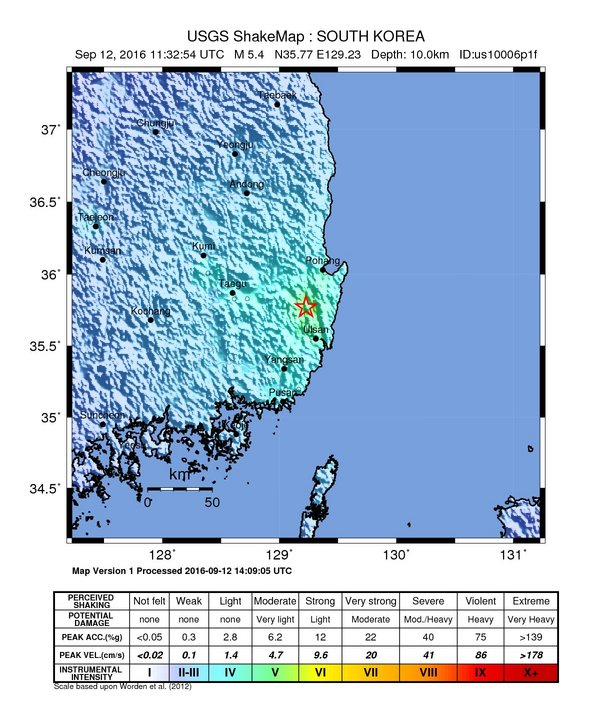

- Location within South Korea
- UTC time: 2016-09-12 11:32:54
- ISC event: 609440121
- USGS-ANSS: ComCat
- Local date: September 12, 2016
- Local time: 20:32:54 KST
- Magnitude: M_{w}^{(USGS)} 5.4; M_{L}^{(KMA)} 5.8
- Depth: 13 kilometers (8.1 mi)
- Type: Strike-slip
- Areas affected: South Korea
- Max. intensity: MMI VI (Strong)
- Tsunami: No
- Landslides: No
- Foreshocks: M_{L} 5.1 (19:44, September 12, 2016)
- Casualties: 8 injured

The 2016 Gyeongju earthquake occurred on September 12 near Gyeongju, South Korea. Measuring 5.8 on the local magnitude scale (5.4 M_{w}), it was the strongest earthquake in the country until the following year. The 2017 Pohang earthquake caused more damage despite being equal in magnitude. An hour before, at 07:44:32 local time, a M_{L} 5.1 foreshock occurred.

== See also ==
- List of earthquakes in 2016
- Yangsan Fault
