= Buk District, Pohang =

Coordinates: 36.041867°N 129.365688°E

Buk-gu
- Non-autonomous District
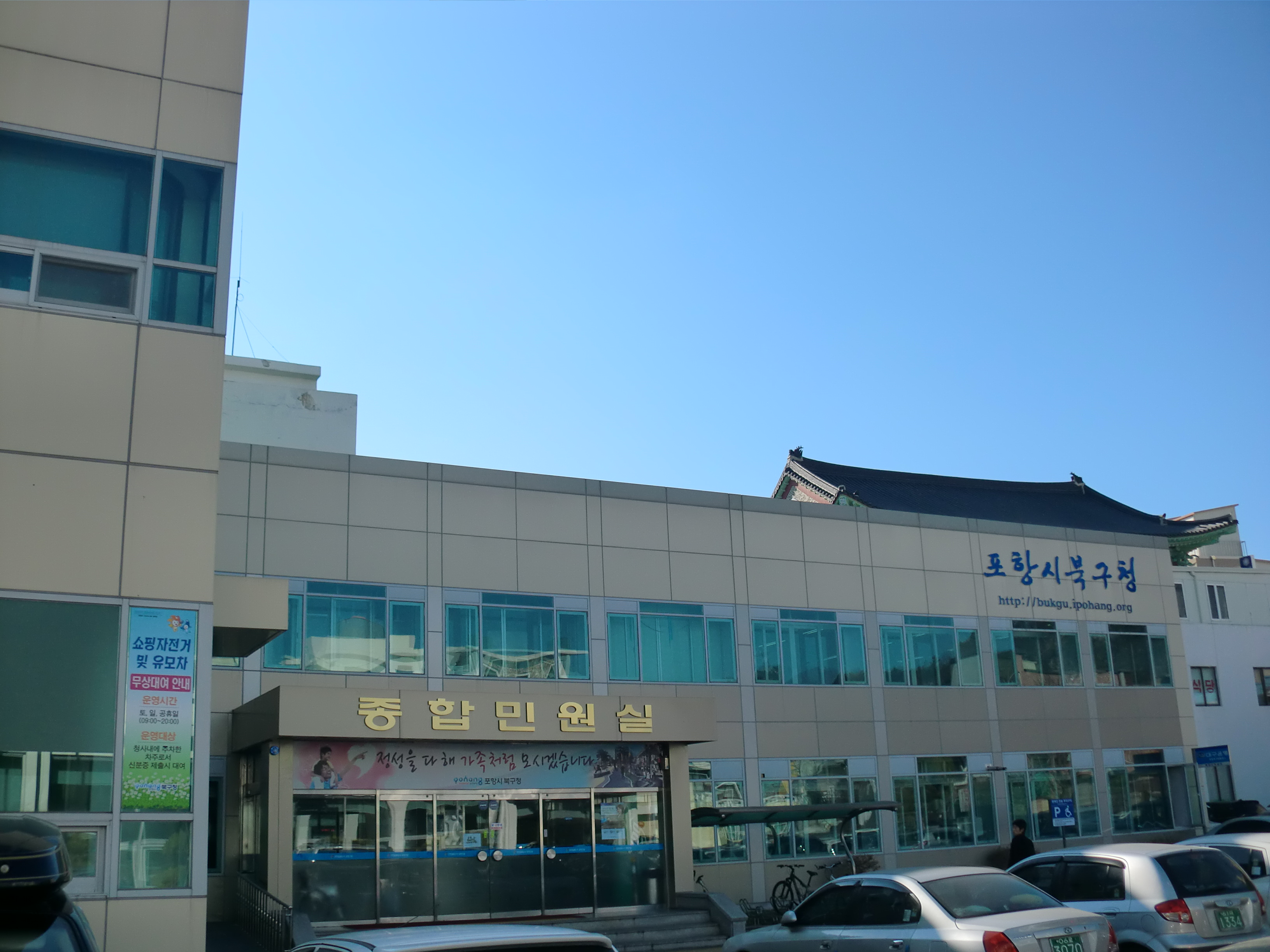
- Buk-gu Office

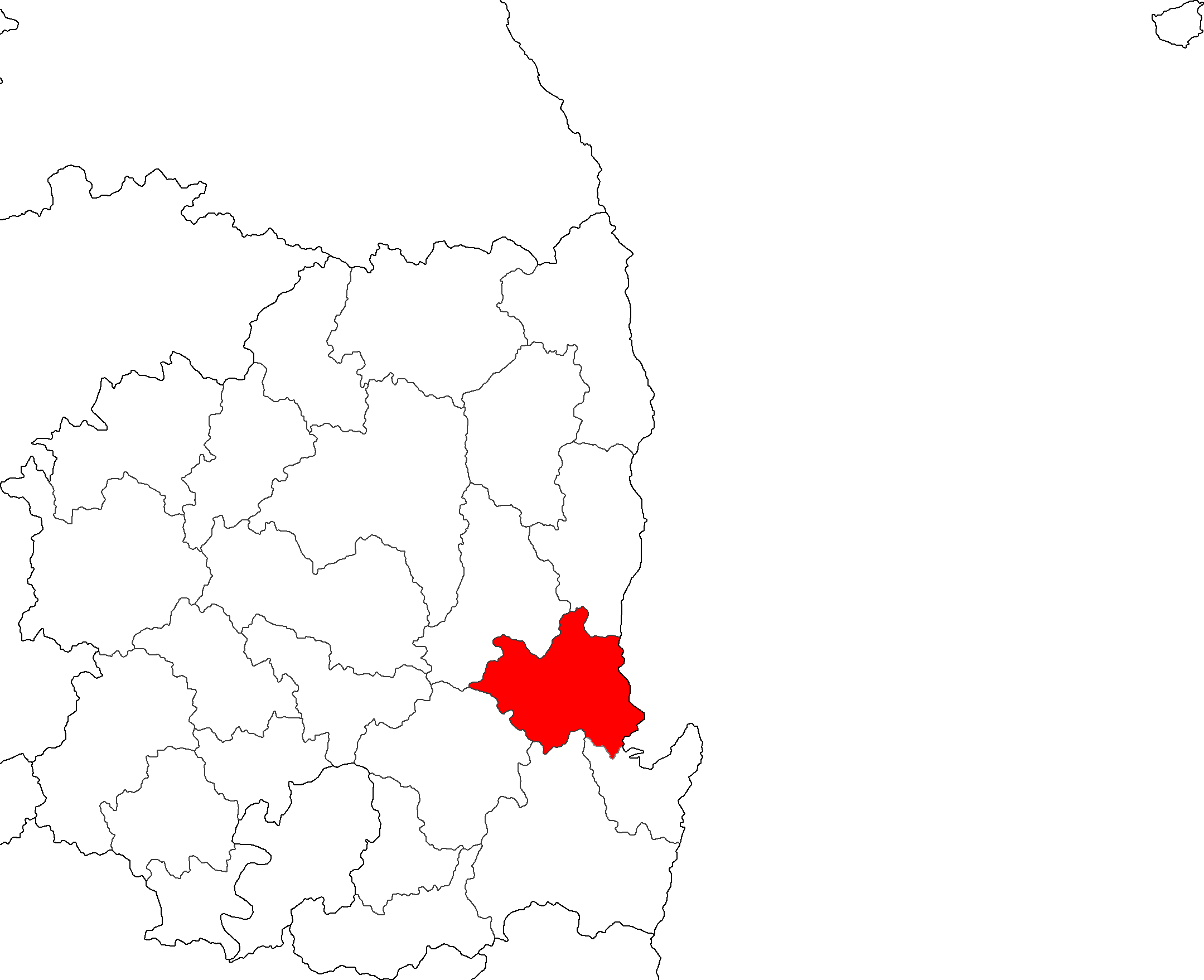
- Country: South Korea
- Region: Yeongnam
- Province: North Gyeongsang
- City: Pohang
- Administrative divisions: 8 dong, 1 eup, 6 myeon

Area
  - Total: 734.8 km^{2} (283.7 sq mi)

Population (2012.11)
  - Total: 267,523
  - Density: 364/km^{2} (940/sq mi)
  - Dialect: Gyeongsang
- Website: bukgu.ipohang.org

Korean name
- Hangul: 북구
- Hanja: 北區
- RR: Buk-gu
- MR: Puk-ku

Buk-gu (Korean: 북구; lit. 'North District') is a non-autonomous district, Pohang in North Gyeongsang Province, South Korea.

== Administrative divisions ==
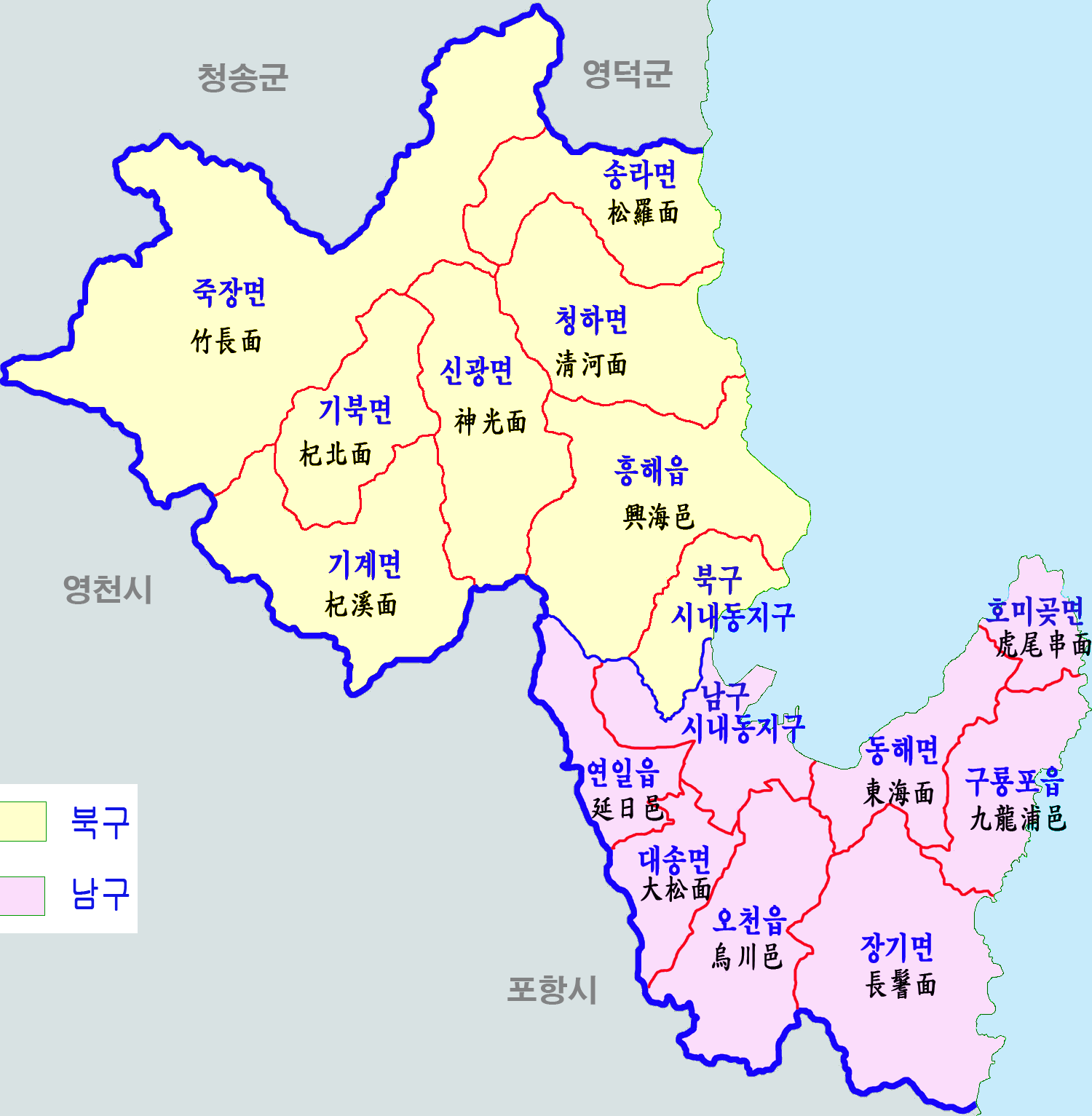
Pohang eup/myeon/dong map in Korean. Yellow is Buk-gu and Purple is Nam-gu.

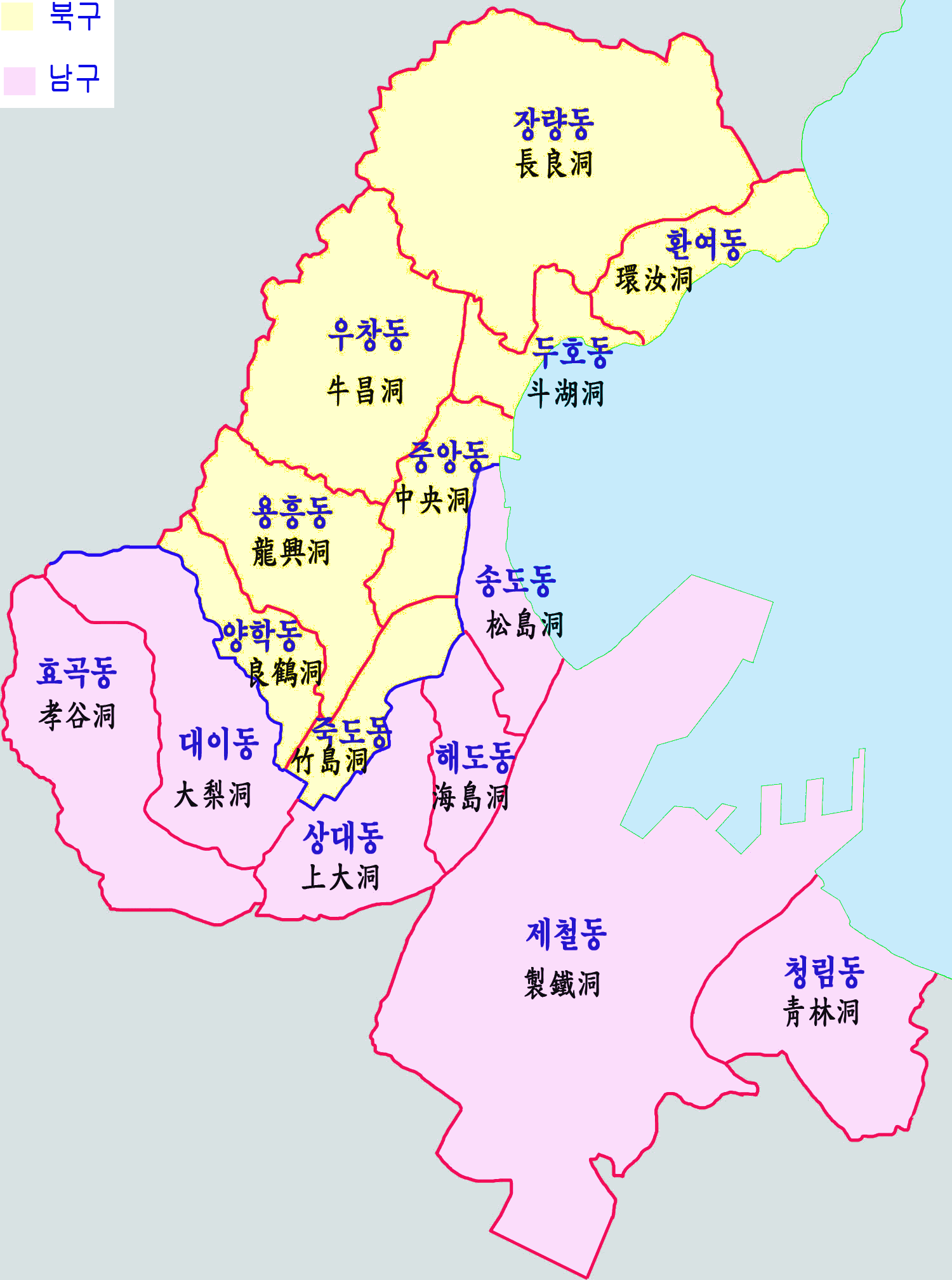
Inset map. Yellow is Buk-gu and Purple is Nam-gu.

Buk-gu is divided into one town (eup), 6 townships (myeon), and 8 neighborhoods (dong).

	Hangul	Hanja
Heunghae-eup	흥해읍	興海邑
Singwang-myeon	신광면	神光面
Cheongha-myeon	청하면	淸河面
Songna-myeon	송라면	松羅面
Gigye-myeon	기계면	杞溪面
Jukjang-myeon	죽장면	竹長面
Gibuk-myeon	기북면	杞北面
Jungang-dong	중앙동	中央洞
Yanghak-dong	양학동	良鶴洞
Jukdo-dong	죽도동	竹島洞
Yongheung-dong	용흥동	龍興洞
Uchang-dong	우창동	牛昌洞
Duho-dong	두호동	斗湖洞
Jangnyang-dong	장량동	長良洞
Hwanyeo-dong	환여동	環汝洞

== Points of interest ==
- Anguksa, a Buddhist temple

== See also ==
- Nam District, Pohang
