= National Route 31 (South Korea) =

Road in South Korea

National Route 31
- 국도 제31호선

Route information
- Length: 750 km (470 mi)
- Existed: 31 August 1971–present

Major junctions
- South end: Donghae Expressway in Gijang County, Busan
- North end: North Korean border in Donggu-myeon, Yanggu County (unofficial); Anbyon County, South Hamgyong Province (official)

Location
- Country: South Korea

Highway system
- Highway systems of South Korea; Expressways; National; Local

National Route 31 is a national highway that runs from the city of Busan, Gijang County, in South Korea, to Singosan (Kosan) and Anbyeon counties in North Korea. Because of the division of the Korean Peninsula, it effectively ends in Yanggu. The route was established on 31 August 1971.

== History ==
- August 31, 1971: National Route No. 31 Pohang ~ Singosan Line was designated by the General National Highway Route Designation Order.
- March 14, 1973: Due to the construction of Soyanggang Dam, the road section from Sinnam-ri, Nam-myeon, Inje-gun to Won-ri, Nam-myeon, Yanggu-gun (15.5 km) that was to be submerged was changed to 13.921 km.
- February 22, 1980: 602 m section at Johang-dong, Naemyeon, Hongcheon-gun opened and existing 960 m section abolished.
- March 14, 1981: Starting point extended from 'Pohang-si, Gyeongsangbuk-do' to 'Ulsan-si, Gyeongsangnam-do'. Accordingly, changed from 'Pohang ~ Singosan Line' to 'Ulsan ~ Singosan Line'.
- April 13, 1981: 72 km section from Sangnam-ri, Girin-myeon, Inje-gun to Dochon-ri, Nam-myeon, Yanggu-gun upgraded to national highway and opened, existing designated section from Sangnam-ri, Girin-myeon, Inje-gun to Dochon-ri, Nam-myeon, Yanggu-gun (50 km) abolished.
- May 8, 1981: 71.7 km section from Suryeom-ri, Yangnam-myeon, Wolseong-gun to Daeheung-dong, Pohang-si upgraded to national highway and opened.
- May 12, 1981: 22.62 km section from Sinhyeon-ri to Sinpyeong-ri, Gangdong-myeon, Ulju-gun upgraded to national highway and opened.
- May 30, 1981: Road zone changed to 98 km section extended according to the amendment of Presidential Decree No. 10247 General National Highway Route Designation Order.
- January 28, 1987: Existing designated section from Hyeoldong, Taebaek-si to Cheonpyeong-ri (Chilrang-ri), Sangdong-eup, Yeongwol-gun (13.5 km) abolished.
- July 15, 1994: 2 km section at Daehwa-ri, Daehwa-myeon, Pyeongchang-gun opened.
- January 12, 1995: Yanggu ~ Wontong Road (Ipyeong-ri, Inje-eup, Inje-gun ~ Yongha-ri, Nam-myeon, Yanggu-gun) 19.9 km section opened.
- July 1, 1996: Starting point extended from 'Ulsan-si, Gyeongsangnam-do' to 'Ilgwang-myeon, Gijang-gun, Busan Metropolitan City'. Accordingly, changed to 'Busan ~ Singosan Line'.
- June 15, 1997: Section from Deokgu-ri to Naedeok-ri, Sangdong-eup, Yeongwol-gun opened, existing 400 m section abolished.
- September 20, 1997: Seomchon Bridge (Seomchon-ri, Irwol-myeon, Yeongyang-gun) 940 m section reconstruction opened, existing 360 m section abolished.
- July 7, 1998: Guji Bridge (Guji-ri, Gigye-myeon, Buk-gu, Pohang-si) 660 m section reconstruction opened, existing section abolished.
- May 15, 1999: Guryongpo ~ Pohang Road (Yakjeon-ri, Donghae-myeon, Nam-gu, Pohang-si ~ Irwol-dong) 2.25 km section expansion opened.
- December 31, 1999: Guryongpo ~ Pohang Road (Seok-ri, Donghae-myeon, Nam-gu, Pohang-si ~ Yakjeon-ri) 1.1 km section expansion opened.
- February 24, 2000: Seok-ri, Donghae-myeon, Nam-gu, Pohang-si, Gyeongsangbuk-do ~ Yugang-ri, Yeonil-eup, Buk-gu (19.1 km section) designated as Automobile-only Road.
- December 20, 2000: Guryongpo ~ Pohang Road (Hajeong-ri, Guryongpo-eup, Nam-gu, Pohang-si ~ Sangjeong-ri, Donghae-myeon) 6.24 km section expansion opened.
- January 22, 2001: Daeryeon Intersection (Daeryeon-ri, Heunghae-eup, Buk-gu, Pohang-si) on Gangdong ~ Heunghae Road grade separation opened.
- May 25, 2001: Guryongpo ~ Pohang Road (Sangjeong 1 Overpass, Sangjeong-ri, Donghae-myeon, Nam-gu, Pohang-si ~ Seokdong 1 Overpass, Seok-ri) 1.96 km section expansion opened.
- September 19, 2001: Guryongpo ~ Pohang Road (Hajeong-ri, Guryongpo-eup, Nam-gu, Pohang-si ~ Irwol-dong) 12.48 km section expansion opened.
- December 29, 2001: Hapgang-ri, Inje-eup, Inje-gun ~ Wontong-ri, Buk-myeon (4.3 km section) expansion opened, existing 6.9 km section abolished.
- December 31, 2001: Bunam Bypass Road (Daejeon-ri, Bunam-myeon, Cheongsong-gun ~ Gamyeon-ri) 2.484 km section expansion opened and existing 3.19 km section abolished, Cheongsong ~ Pacheon Road (Geumgok-ri, Cheongsong-eup, Cheongsong-gun ~ Gwan-ri, Pacheon-myeon) 5.72 km section expansion opened and existing 6.14 km section abolished.
- November 12, 2002: Yangnam Bypass Road (Suryeom-ri, Yangnam-myeon, Gyeongju-si ~ Haseo-ri) 3.18 km section opened, existing 3.31 km section abolished.
- January 1, 2003: Yeongyang Bypass Road (Hyeon-ri, Yeongyang-eup, Yeongyang-gun ~ Dongbu-ri) 6.005 km section expansion opened, existing 4.5 km section abolished.
- November 9, 2005: Yugang-ri, Yeonil-eup, Nam-gu, Pohang-si ~ Seonggok-ri, Heunghae-eup, Buk-gu (9.58 km section) designated as Automobile-only Road.
- February 16, 2006: Bonggil-ri, Yangbuk-myeon, Gyeongju-si (1.3 km section) relocation opened, existing 1.8 km section abolished.
- December 27, 2006: Pohang-si National Highway Alternative Bypass Road (Mundeok ~ Yugang Road, Ubok-ri, Yeonil-eup, Nam-gu, Pohang-si ~ Yugang-ri) 5.64 km section new construction opened.
- December 27, 2007: Suryeom-ri, Yangnam-myeon, Gyeongju-si (400 m section) on Ulsan ~ Gangdong Road expansion opened.
- March 5, 2009: Sangyeonam Intersection ~ Sinmyeong Intersection (Yeonam-dong, Buk-gu, Ulsan Metropolitan City ~ Sinmyeong-dong) 11 km section on Ulsan ~ Gangdong Road designated as Automobile-only Road.
- July 10, 2009: Donggang Bridge (Hasong-ri, Yeongwol-eup, Yeongwol-gun ~ Deokpo-ri) section expansion opened.
- June 28, 2010: Imdang ~ Dumil Road (Imdang-ri, Dong-myeon, Yanggu-gun ~ Wolun-ri) 3.63 km section realignment opened.
- September 14, 2010: Bukssang-ri, Nam-myeon, Yeongwol-gun section realignment.
- June 10, 2011: Cheoyong-ri, Onsan-eup, Ulju-gun, Ulsan Metropolitan City ~ Duwang-dong, Nam-gu (6.5 km section) designated as Automobile-only Road.
- September 27, 2011: Icheon-ri, Ilgwang-myeon, Gijang-gun, Busan Metropolitan City ~ Gangyang-ri, Onsan-eup, Ulju-gun, Ulsan Metropolitan City (19.09 km section) designated as Automobile-only Road.
- December 23, 2011: Pohang-si National Highway Alternative Bypass Road (Yugang-ri, Yeonil-eup, Pohang-si ~ Daeryeon-ri, Heunghae-eup, 4.6 km section and Seok-ri, Donghae-myeon, Pohang-si ~ Daegak-ri, Daesong-myeon, 11.74 km section) new construction opened.
- September 27, 2012: Eupcheon-ri, Yangnam-myeon, Gyeongju-si ~ Bonggil-ri, Yangbuk-myeon (6.0 km section) expansion opened, existing 6.9 km section abolished.
- July 1, 2014: Onsan ~ Duwang Road (Cheoyong-ri, Onsan-eup, Ulju-gun ~ Duwang-dong, Nam-gu) 6.5 km section expansion opened.
- October 29, 2014: Ipam Bypass Road (Samsan-ri, Ipam-myeon, Yeongyang-gun ~ Singu-ri) 2.06 km section new construction opened and existing 2.3 km section abolished.
- December 26, 2014: Gijang ~ Jangan Road (Icheon-ri, Ilgwang-myeon, Gijang-gun ~ Imnang-ri, Jangan-eup) 6.03 km section new construction opened, existing Samseong-ri, Ilgwang-myeon, Gijang-gun ~ Wolnae-ri, Jangan-eup (9.57 km section) abolished.
- December 30, 2014: Yeongwol ~ Jungdong Bypass Road (Nokjeon-ri, Jungdong-myeon, Yeongwol-gun ~ Imok-ri) 4.0 km section opened, Gyeongju ~ Gampo Road (Najeong-ri, Gampo-eup, Gyeongju-si ~ Jeonchon-ri) 570 m section expansion opened.
- December 31, 2014: Dangwol-ri, Onsan-eup, Ulju-gun (420 m section) partially opened.
- June 10, 2015: Nammyeon Bypass Road (Juk-ri, Nam-myeon, Yanggu-gun ~ Yachon-ri) 6.64 km section expansion opened, existing Guam-ri, Nam-myeon, Yanggu-gun ~ Yachon-ri (8.14 km section) abolished.
- September 10, 2015: Surari Pass Tunnel (Imok-ri, Jungdong-myeon, Yeongwol-gun ~ Hwawon-ri) 6.0 km section expansion opened, existing 5.1 km section abolished.
- April 10, 2017: Nasa-ri, Saengseong-myeon, Ulju-gun (170 m section) opened, existing 220 m section abolished.
- May 10, 2017: Yeongwol ~ Bangnim Road Section 2 (Yeondeok-ri, Buk-myeon, Yeongwol-gun ~ Ha-ri, Pyeongchang-eup, Pyeongchang-gun) 13.54 km section expansion opened, existing 16.74 km section abolished.
- December 27, 2017: Dunnae ~ Mui Road Section 2 (Yongjeon-ri, Yongpyeong-myeon, Pyeongchang-gun ~ Soksa-ri) total 8.52 km section expansion opened.
- January 30, 2018: Socheon ~ Dogye Road Section 1 (Hyeondong-ri, Socheon-myeon, Bonghwa-gun ~ Goseon-ri) 10.02 km section temporarily opened, Socheon ~ Dogye Road Section 2 (Goseon-ri, Socheon-myeon, Bonghwa-gun, Gyeongsangbuk-do ~ Jangseong-dong, Taebaek-si, Gangwon-do) 10.19 km section early opening.
- March 7, 2018: Jangan ~ Onsan Road Section 1 (Jwacheon-ri, Jangan-eup, Gijang-gun, Busan Metropolitan City ~ Myeongsan-ri, Saengseong-myeon, Ulju-gun, Ulsan Metropolitan City) 7.68 km section new construction opened, existing Wolnae-ri, Jangan-eup, Gijang-gun, Busan Metropolitan City ~ Sinam-ri, Saengseong-myeon, Ulju-gun, Ulsan Metropolitan City (2.5 km section) abolished.
- March 15, 2018: For smooth implementation of the Jangan ~ Saengseong national highway relocation construction within the Shin-Kori Nuclear Power Plant Units 5 and 6 construction project area, the abolished section was corrected from Wolnae-ri, Jangan-eup, Gijang-gun, Busan Metropolitan City ~ Sinam-ri, Saengseong-myeon, Ulju-gun, Ulsan Metropolitan City (2.5 km section) to Wolnae-ri, Jangan-eup, Gijang-gun, Busan Metropolitan City ~ Gilcheon-ri (200 m section).
- March 27, 2018: Due to completion of Socheon ~ Dogye Road Section 2, existing Goseon-ri, Socheon-myeon, Bonghwa-gun ~ Daehyeon-ri, Seokpo-myeon (12.1 km section) abolished.
- July 3, 2018: Heunghae ~ Gigye Road Section 2 (Naedan-ri, Gigye-myeon, Buk-gu, Pohang-si ~ Hyeonnae-ri) 620 m section expansion opened and existing section abolished.
- September 21, 2018: Heunghae ~ Gigye Road Section 1 (Naedan-ri, Gigye-myeon, Buk-gu, Pohang-si ~ Dasan-ri, Gangdong-myeon, Gyeongju-si) 5.5 km section partially opened, existing 4.01 km section abolished.
- October 10, 2018: For smooth implementation of the Jangan ~ Saengseong national highway relocation construction within the Shin-Kori Nuclear Power Plant Units 5 and 6 construction project area, Gilcheon-ri, Jangan-eup, Gijang-gun, Busan Metropolitan City (approximately 100 m section) additionally abolished.
- October 17, 2018: Due to completion of Socheon ~ Dogye Road Section 1, existing Hyeondong-ri, Socheon-myeon, Bonghwa-gun ~ Goseon-ri (13.2 km section) abolished.
- October 31, 2018: Gampo ~ Guryongpo Road (Najeong-ri, Gampo-eup, Gyeongju-si ~ Oryu-ri) 4.98 km section expansion opened and existing 4.9 km section abolished.
- December 27, 2018: Heunghae ~ Gigye Road Section 1 (Daeryeon-ri, Heunghae-eup, Buk-gu, Pohang-si ~ Daljeon-ri, Yeonil-eup, Nam-gu) 2.8 km section expansion opened, existing Hakjeon-ri, Yeonil-eup, Nam-gu, Pohang-si ~ Daljeon-ri (1.6 km section) abolished.
- December 31, 2018: Yeongwol ~ Bangnim Road Section 1 (Hupyeong-ri, Pyeongchang-eup, Pyeongchang-gun ~ Bangnim-ri, Bangnim-myeon) 6.2 km section expansion opened, existing 6.1 km section and Bangnim-ri, Bangnim-myeon, Pyeongchang-gun (500 m section) abolished.
- June 21, 2019: Omijae Tunnel (Sangnam-ri, Sangnam-myeon, Inje-gun ~ Hanam-ri) 2.79 km section new construction opened, existing Sangnam-ri, Sangnam-myeon, Inje-gun (2.2 km section) abolished.
- August 1, 2019: Jangan ~ Onsan Road Section 2 (Gangyang-ri, Onsan-eup, Ulju-gun ~ Dangwol-ri) 2.4 km section partial expansion opened, existing 3.4 km section abolished.
- November 15, 2019: Jangan ~ Onsan Road Section 2 (Myeongsan-ri, Saengseong-myeon, Ulju-gun ~ Gangyang-ri, Onsan-eup) 5.59 km section new construction opened, existing Sinam-ri, Saengseong-myeon, Ulju-gun ~ Gangyang-ri, Onsan-eup (11.1 km section) abolished.
- December 24, 2020: Cheongsong Bypass Road (Cheongun-ri, Cheongsong-eup, Cheongsong-gun ~ Geumgok-ri) 4.4 km section new construction opened.
- January 14, 2021: Due to opening of Cheongsong Bypass Road, existing Cheongun-ri, Cheongsong-eup, Cheongsong-gun ~ Geumgok-ri (4.1 km section) abolished.
- April 2, 2021: Sangnam-ri, Sangnam-myeon, Inje-gun (600 m section) opened, existing section abolished.
- May 31, 2023: Samjahyeon Tunnel (Dopyeong-ri, Hyeondong-myeon, Cheongsong-gun ~ Daejeon-ri, Bunam-myeon) 4.76 km section temporarily opened until June 6.
- June 7, 2023: Samjahyeon Tunnel opened.

== Main stopovers ==
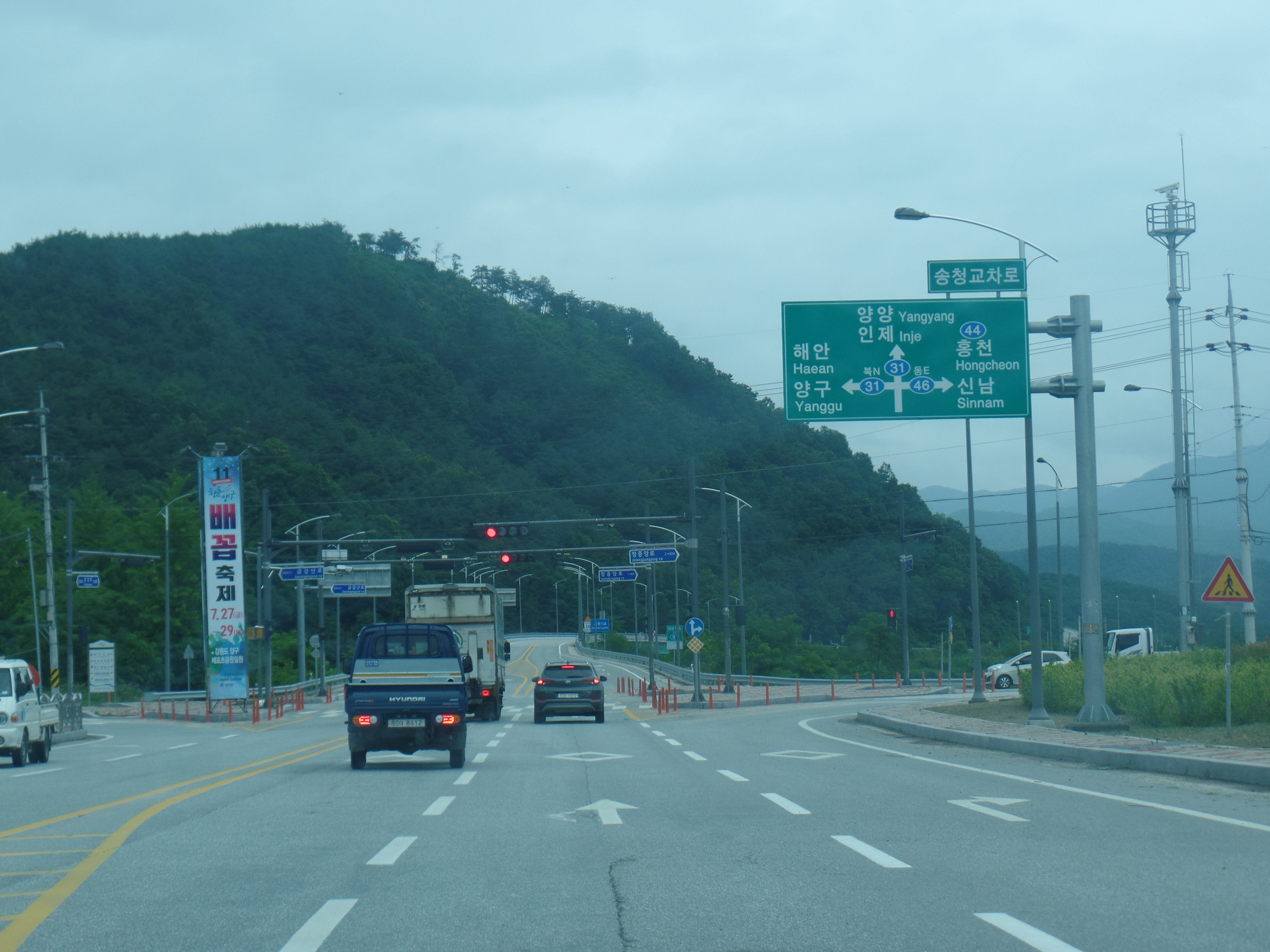
Songcheong Intersection in Gangwon Province.

=== South Korean parts ===
Busan

- Gijang County

Ulsan

- Ulju County - Nam District - Jung District - Buk District

North Gyeongsang Province

- Gyeongju - Pohang - Buk District (Pohang) - Gangdong-myeon (Gyeongju) - Buk District (Pohang) - Cheongsong County - Yeongyang County - Bonghwa County

Gangwon Province

- Taebaek - Yeongwol County - Pyeongchang County - Hongcheon County - Inje County - Yanggu County

=== North Korean parts ===
Kangwon

- Suip-myeon - Hoeyang

North Hamgyeong

- Singosan-myeon, Anbyeon

== Major intersections ==
- (■): Motorway

IS: Intersection, IC: Interchange

=== Busan ===
Name	Hangul name	Connection	Location		Note
Gijang IC IS	기장 나들목 (기장IC 교차로)	Donghae Expressway; National Route 14 (Gijang-daero)	Gijang County	Ilgwang-myeon	Terminus
Icheon IS	이천 교차로	Ilgwang-ro	Gijang County	Ilgwang-myeon	
Dongbaek IS	동백 교차로	Chayang-gil	Gijang County	Ilgwang-myeon	
Munjung IS	문중 교차로	Janggok-gil	Gijang County	Ilgwang-myeon	
Chilammunjung Village	칠암문중마을경계지	Munjung-gil; Janggok-gil	Gijang County	Ilgwang-myeon	
Imrang Bridge	임랑교		Gijang County	Ilgwang-myeon	
Imrang Bridge			Gijang County	Jangan-eup	
Imrang IS	임랑삼거리	Prefectural Route 60 (Haemaji-ro)	Gijang County	Jangan-eup	
Wollae Station Entrance	월내역입구	Wollae-gil	Gijang County	Jangan-eup	
Gilcheon IS	길천삼거리	Gomu-ro	Gijang County	Jangan-eup	
Gilcheon IS	길천 교차로	Gilcheon-gil	Gijang County	Jangan-eup	
Hyoam IS	효암삼거리		Gijang County	Jangan-eup	Continuation into Ulsan

=== Ulsan ===
Name	Hangul name	Connection	Location		Note
Kori Nuclear Power Plant IS	신고리원전 교차로	Cheonsan-ro	Ulju County	Seosaeng-myeon	Busan - Ulsan border line
Myeongsan IS	명산삼거리	Yeonsan 3-gil	Ulju County	Seosaeng-myeon	
Silli IS	신리삼거리	Silli-gil	Ulju County	Seosaeng-myeon	
Seosaeng Sport Park	서생체육공원		Ulju County	Seosaeng-myeon	
Sinam IS	신암삼거리	Silli-gil	Ulju County	Seosaeng-myeon	
Seosaeng-myeon Office IS	서생면사무소 교차로		Ulju County	Seosaeng-myeon	
Seosaeng Middle School	서생중학교	Dangmol-gil	Ulju County	Seosaeng-myeon	
Gangeolgot IS	간절곶삼거리	Ganjeolgot 2-gil	Ulju County	Seosaeng-myeon	
Jinhacheon IS	진하천삼거리	Jinhahaebyeon-gil	Ulju County	Seosaeng-myeon	
Seosaeng IS	서생삼거리	Onyang-ro	Ulju County	Seosaeng-myeon	
Seosaeng Bridge	서생교		Ulju County	Seosaeng-myeon	
Seosaeng Bridge			Ulju County	Onsan-eup	
Dangwol IS	당월삼거리	Gongdan-ro	Ulju County	Onsan-eup	
Onsan Sewage Treatment Plant	온산하수종말처리장	Wonbong-ro	Ulju County	Onsan-eup	
Sejin Heavy Industries	세진중공업앞		Ulju County	Onsan-eup	
Onsan Station IS	온산역사거리	Ijin-ro	Ulju County	Onsan-eup	
Onsan Port IS	온산항사거리	Sanam-ro	Ulju County	Onsan-eup	
S-Oil	에쓰오일후문		Ulju County	Onsan-eup	
Bangdo-ro Entrance	방도로입구	Bangdo-ro	Ulju County	Onsan-eup	
Onsan IS	온산 교차로	Uiwang-ro	Ulju County	Onsan-eup	
Cheoyong IS (Cheoyong Underpass)	처용 교차로 (처용지하차도)	Gaeun-ro	Ulju County	Onsan-eup	
Odae IS	오대 교차로	Cheoyong Industrial-ro	Ulju County	Onsan-eup	
Odae Bridge Hwachang Bridge	오대교 화창교		Ulju County	Onsan-eup	
Deokha IS	덕하 교차로	Onsan-ro	Ulsan	Nam District	
Duwang IS	두왕사거리	Namchang-ro; Saneom-ro	Ulsan	Nam District	
Jeongjaegol Entrance Gaeun Elementary School Entrance	정애골입구 개운초등학교입구		Ulsan	Nam District	
Gamnamujin IS	감나무진사거리	Southern Ring Road; Duwang-ro154beon-gil	Ulsan	Nam District	
Hwalgogae IS	활고개 교차로	Duwang-ro190beon-gil	Ulsan	Nam District	
Duwang Overpass	두왕육교	Sinseon-ro	Ulsan	Nam District	
Goba Gas Station Park Town Ulsan Museum Shinil Middle School Ulsan Women's Commercial High School	고바우주유소앞 공원마을앞 울산박물관 신일중학교 울산여자상업고등학교		Ulsan	Nam District	
Ulsan Industrial Center Monument	공업탑로터리	Munsu-ro; Samsan-ro; Suam-ro	Ulsan	Nam District	
Shinjeong 2-dong Community Center	신정2동주민센터입구		Ulsan	Nam District	
Bongwol IS	봉월사거리	Dotjil-ro; Dongsal-ro	Ulsan	Nam District	
Eunwol IS	은월사거리	Wolpyeong-ro; Bongwol-ro89beon-gil	Ulsan	Nam District	
Sinjeong 1 Police Station	신정1치안센터		Ulsan	Nam District	
Paldeung-ro Entrance IS	팔등로입구 교차로	Paldeung-ro; Geoma-ro117beon-gil	Ulsan	Nam District	
Taehwa Hospital Ihyujeong Entrance	태화병원앞 이휴정입구		Ulsan	Nam District	
Taehwa Rotary	태화로터리	Gangnam-ro; Namsal-ro; Jungang-ro	Ulsan	Nam District	
Taehwa Bridge	태화교		Ulsan	Nam District	
Taehwa Bridge			Ulsan	Jung District	
Ujeong IS	우정사거리	Gangbuk-ro; Taehwa-ro	Ulsan	Jung District	
RIVER SUITE	리버스위트앞		Ulsan	Jung District	
Seongyeong 2 Apartment	선경2차아파트앞	Yugok-ro; Jangchun-ro	Ulsan	Jung District	
Seongyeong 1 Apartment	선경1차아파트앞	Uam 2-gil	Ulsan	Jung District	
Ujeong Elementary School	우정초등학교앞	Ujeong 3-gil	Ulsan	Jung District	
Hyanggyoap IS	향교앞 교차로	Ongsugol-gil; Ujeong-gil	Ulsan	Jung District	
Ulsanhyanggyo	울산향교		Ulsan	Jung District	
Gyodong Apartment	교동아파트앞	Choeun-gil	Ulsan	Jung District	
Bukjeong IS	북정 교차로	National Route 7 (Southern Ring Road); Seongan-ro; Dongheonseo-gil	Ulsan	Jung District	National Route 7 overlap
Bukjeong IS	북정삼거리	Okgyodong-gil	Ulsan	Jung District	National Route 7 overlap
Boksan IS	복산삼거리	Boksan1dong-gil	Ulsan	Jung District	National Route 7 overlap
Boksan 1-dong Community Center	복산1동주민센터		Ulsan	Jung District	National Route 7 overlap
Dongdeok Apartment	동덕아파트앞	Gyebyeon-ro	Ulsan	Jung District	National Route 7 overlap
Saeun Apartment	새운파래스앞		Ulsan	Jung District	National Route 7 overlap
Jung District Office IS	중구청삼거리	Hwahap-ro	Ulsan	Jung District	National Route 7 overlap
Samhwan Apartment	삼환아파트앞	Pyeongsan-ro	Ulsan	Jung District	National Route 7 overlap
Ulsan Hyein School	울산혜인학교		Ulsan	Jung District	National Route 7 overlap
Dongjung IS	동중사거리	Gwangnam-gil	Ulsan	Jung District	National Route 7 overlap
Seodong IS	서동삼거리	Dongcheonseo-ro	Ulsan	Jung District	National Route 7 overlap
Samil Elementary School	삼일초등학교앞		Ulsan	Jung District	National Route 7 overlap
Seodong IS	서동사거리	Byeongyeong-ro	Ulsan	Jung District	National Route 7 overlap
Korea Polytechnic University	한국폴리텍VII대학	Sanjeon-gil	Ulsan	Jung District	National Route 7 overlap
Samil Bridge	삼일교		Ulsan	Jung District	National Route 7 overlap
Samil Bridge			Ulsan	Buk District	National Route 7 overlap
Jinjang IS	진장사거리	Angibeondeuk-gil; Jinjangyutong-ro	Ulsan	Buk District	National Route 7 overlap
Sangbang IS	상방사거리	National Route 7 (Saneom-ro)	Ulsan	Buk District	National Route 7 overlap
Buk-gu Office South Gate (Near Ulsan Airport)	북구청남문		Ulsan	Buk District	
29 Square IS	29호광장사거리	Sangbang-ro; Hyoam-ro	Ulsan	Buk District	
Seyanggonggu Town	세양공구타운	Hwabong-ro	Ulsan	Buk District	
Yeonam Bus Terminal	연암버스종점		Ulsan	Buk District	
Yeonam IC IS	연암IC 교차로	Otobaelri-ro	Ulsan	Buk District	
Yeonambaemyeon IS	연암배면 교차로	Muryong 1-ro	Ulsan	Buk District	
Sangyeonam Entrance	상연암입구	Sangyeonam-gil	Ulsan	Buk District	
Yeonam IS	연암 교차로		Ulsan	Buk District	
Muryong Tunnel	무룡터널		Ulsan	Buk District	Right tunnel: Approximately 999m Left tunnel: Approximately 990m
Gunam IS	구남 교차로		Ulsan	Buk District	
Muryong IS	무룡 교차로	Dalgok 1-gil	Ulsan	Buk District	
Sanha IS	산하 교차로	Saneum 1-gil	Ulsan	Buk District	
Sangsinmyeong Bridge	상신명교		Ulsan	Buk District	
Sinmyeong IS	신명 교차로	Donghaean-ro	Ulsan	Buk District	
Jigyeong IS	지경 교차로	Jigyeong-gil	Ulsan	Buk District	Continuation into North Gyeongsang Province

=== North Gyeongsang Province ===
Name	Hangul name	Connection	Location		Note
Gwanseong 1 Bridge	관성1Approximately 600 m		Gyeongju City	Yangnam-myeon	Ulsan–North Gyeongsang Province border
Yangnam IS	양남사거리	Prefectural Route 904 (Oenam-ro)	Gyeongju City	Yangnam-myeon	
Haseo IS	하서삼거리	Haebyeongongwon-gil	Gyeongju City	Yangnam-myeon	
Haseo Bridge	하서교		Gyeongju City	Yangnam-myeon	
Wolseong Sport Center	월성스포츠센터		Gyeongju City	Yangnam-myeon	
Nasan Elementary School	나산초등학교	Donghaean-ro	Gyeongju City	Yangnam-myeon	
Eupcheon IS	읍천 교차로	Naa 1-gil Naa 2-gil	Gyeongju City	Yangnam-myeon	
Naa IS	나아 교차로	Donghaean-ro; Naa 3-gil	Gyeongju City	Yangnam-myeon	
Nasan IS	나산 교차로	Nasansangna-gil	Gyeongju City	Yangnam-myeon	
Bonggil Tunnel	봉길터널		Gyeongju City	Yangnam-myeon	Approximately 2,430 m
Bonggil Tunnel			Gyeongju City	Yangbuk-myeon	Approximately 2,430 m
Bonggilri IS	봉길리 교차로	Donghaean-ro	Gyeongju City	Yangbuk-myeon	
Daejong Bridge	대종교		Gyeongju City	Yangbuk-myeon	
Daejong Bridge			Gyeongju City	Gampo-eup	
Daebon IS	대본삼거리	Prefectural Route 929 (Gameun-ro)	Gyeongju City	Gampo-eup	
Gampo Resort	감포관광단지		Gyeongju City	Gampo-eup	
Gampo IS	감포 교차로	National Route 4 (Tohamsan-ro)	Gyeongju City	Gampo-eup	National Route 4 overlap
Jeonchon IS	전촌삼거리	Gyeonggam-ro	Gyeongju City	Gampo-eup	National Route 4 overlap
Jeonchon Bridge	전촌교		Gyeongju City	Gampo-eup	
Gampo Library	감포도서관	Gampo-ro	Gyeongju City	Gampo-eup	
Gampo Bus Terminal	감포버스정류장		Gyeongju City	Gampo-eup	
Oryu IS	오류삼거리	Gampo-ro; Oryu-gil	Gyeongju City	Gampo-eup	
Yangpo Bridge	양포교		Pohang City	Nam District (Janggi-myeon)	
Yangpo IS	양포삼거리	Prefectural Route 929 (Janggi-ro)	Pohang City	Nam District (Janggi-myeon)	
Geumgok Bridge Daejin Bridge Janggi Elementary School (Mopo Branch School)	금곡교 대진교 장기초등학교 모포분교		Pohang City	Nam District (Janggi-myeon)	
No name	(이름 없음)	Jeongdong-gil	Pohang City	Nam District (Guryongpo-eup)	
Gupyeong Bridge	구평교		Pohang City	Nam District (Guryongpo-eup)	
Hajeong IS	하정삼거리	Hajeong-ro	Pohang City	Nam District (Guryongpo-eup)	
Byeongpo 1 Overpass	병포1육교	Prefectural Route 929 (Homi-ro)	Pohang City	Nam District (Guryongpo-eup)	
Sangjeong IS	상정 교차로	Sangjeong-gil	Pohang City	Nam District (Donghae-myeon)	
No name	(이름 없음)	Irwol-ro	Pohang City	Nam District (Donghae-myeon)	
Donghae IS	동해 교차로	Donghaean-ro	Pohang City	Nam District (Donghae-myeon)	
Geumgwang IS	금광 교차로	Geumgwang-ro	Pohang City	Nam District (Donghae-myeon)	
Segye IS	세계 교차로	Prefectural Route 929 (Janggi-ro)	Pohang City	Nam District (Ocheon-eup)	
Ocheon IS	오천 교차로	Jung Mongju-ro 294beon-gil	Pohang City	Nam District (Ocheon-eup)	Connects to National Route 14
Yongsan Bridge	용산교		Pohang City	Nam District (Ocheon-eup)	
South Pohang IC	남포항 나들목	Donghae Expressway; Mundeokseo-ro	Pohang City	Nam District (Ocheon-eup)	
Daesong IS	대송 교차로	Dongkuk-ro	Pohang City	Nam District (Daesong-myeon)	
Ubok IS	우복 교차로	National Route 20 (Geonposaneop-ro)	Pohang City	Nam District (Yeonil-eup)	
Inju IS	인주 교차로	Yeonil-ro	Pohang City	Nam District (Yeonil-eup)	
Hyeongsan IS	형산 교차로	Hyeongsangangnam-ro	Pohang City	Nam District (Yeonil-eup)	
Yugang Bridge	유강대교		Pohang City	Nam District (Yeonil-eup)	
Yugang IS	유강 교차로	National Route 7 (Saecheonnyeon-daero)	Pohang City	Nam District (Yeonil-eup)	
Jamyeong IS	자명 교차로	Jamyeong-ro	Pohang City	Nam District (Yeonil-eup)	
Wonjae Bridge	원재교		Pohang City	Nam District (Yeonil-eup)	
Pohang IC	포항 나들목	Iksan–Pohang Expressway; Huimang-daero	Pohang City	Nam District (Yeonil-eup)	
Pohang IC		Iksan–Pohang Expressway; Huimang-daero	Pohang City	Buk District (Heunghae-eup)	
No name (Tunnel)	(터널 명칭 미상)		Pohang City	Buk District (Heunghae-eup)	Approximately 90 m
Yeonhwa IS	연화 교차로	Yeongilman-daero; Saemaeul-ro	Pohang City	Buk District (Heunghae-eup)	
Daeryeon IS	대련삼거리	Daljeon-ro	Pohang City	Buk District (Heunghae-eup)	
Daeryeon IC	대련 나들목	National Route 28 (Donghae-daero)	Pohang City	Buk District (Heunghae-eup)	
Hakjeon IC	학전 나들목	Iksan–Pohang Expressway	Pohang City	Nam District (Yeonil-eup)	
No name	(이름 없음)	Jamyeong-ro	Pohang City	Nam District (Yeonil-eup)	
Dangu Bridge	단구교		Gyeongju City	Gangdong-myeon	
Dalseong IS	달성네거리	Prefectural Route 68 (Bihak-ro) (Anhyeon-ro)	Gyeongju City	Gangdong-myeon	
Naedan 2 Bridge	내단2교		Pohang City	Buk District (Gigye-myeon)	
West Pohang IC	서포항 나들목	Iksan–Pohang Expressway	Pohang City	Buk District (Gigye-myeon)	
Naedan 1 Bridge	내단1교	Gigye-ro	Pohang City	Buk District (Gigye-myeon)	
No name	(이름 없음)	Gigye-ro	Pohang City	Buk District (Gigye-myeon)	
Inbi Bridge	(인비교 북단)	Prefectural Route 921 (Gibuk-ro) (Ginam-gil)	Pohang City	Buk District (Gigye-myeon)	
Guji Bridge	구지교		Pohang City	Buk District (Gigye-myeon)	
Hanti Tunnel	한티터널		Pohang City	Buk District (Gigye-myeon)	Approximately 200 m
Hanti Tunnel			Pohang City	Buk District (Jukjang-myeon)	Approximately 200 m
Jidong IS	지동삼거리	Prefectural Route 69 (Poeun-ro)	Pohang City	Buk District (Jukjang-myeon)	Prefectural Route 69 overlap
Jukjang Elementary School	죽장초등학교		Pohang City	Buk District (Jukjang-myeon)	Prefectural Route 69 overlap
Jukjang IS	죽장삼거리	Prefectural Route 69 (Jukjang-ro)	Pohang City	Buk District (Jukjang-myeon)	Prefectural Route 69 overlap
Hapdeok Bridge	합덕교		Pohang City	Buk District (Jukjang-myeon)	
Kkokdubangjae	꼭두방재		Pohang City	Buk District (Jukjang-myeon)	
Kkokdubangjae			Cheongsong County	Hyeondong-myeon	
Geoseong Bridge	거성교		Cheongsong County	Hyeondong-myeon	
Dopyeong IS	도평삼거리	Prefectural Route 68 (Cheongsong-ro)	Cheongsong County	Hyeondong-myeon	Prefectural Route 68 overlap
Dopyeong Elementary School	도평초등학교		Cheongsong County	Hyeondong-myeon	Prefectural Route 68 overlap
Hyeondong Junior High School	현동중학교	Prefectural Route 908 (Anhyeon-ro)	Cheongsong County	Hyeondong-myeon	Prefectural Route 68, 908 overlap
Samjahyeon	삼자현		Cheongsong County	Hyeondong-myeon	Prefectural Route 68, 908 overlap
Samjahyeon			Cheongsong County	Bunam-myeon	Prefectural Route 68, 908 overlap
Daejeon IS	대전 교차로	Prefectural Route 68 (Daejeon-ro); Prefectural Route 930 (Baekseoktan-ro)	Cheongsong County	Bunam-myeon	Prefectural Route 68, 908 overlap
Gamyeon IS	감연 교차로	Daejeon-ro; Gamyeon-gil	Cheongsong County	Bunam-myeon	Prefectural Route 908 overlap
Sangpyeong-ri	상평리	Prefectural Route 908 (Budong-ro)	Cheongsong County	Budong-myeon	Prefectural Route 908 overlap
Cheongun Elementary School (Closed)	청운초등학교 (폐교)		Cheongsong County	Cheongsong-eup	
Cheongun IS	청운삼거리	Prefectural Route 914 (Juwangsan-ro)	Cheongsong County	Cheongsong-eup	Prefectural Route 914 overlap
Geumgok Overpass	금곡육교	Prefectural Route 914 (Geumwol-ro)	Cheongsong County	Cheongsong-eup	Prefectural Route 914 overlap
Cheongsong Tunnel	청송터널		Cheongsong County	Cheongsong-eup	Approximately 606m
Cheongsong IS	청송 교차로	Prefectural Route 914 (Girancheongsong-ro)	Cheongsong County	Cheongsong-eup	
Cheongsong 1 Bridge	청송1교		Cheongsong County	Cheongsong-eup	
Cheongsong 1 Bridge			Cheongsong County	Pacheon-myeon	
Cheongsong 1 Bridge	청송1교 북단	Jungang-ro	Cheongsong County	Pacheon-myeon	
Yangji IS	양지 교차로	Anpa-ro	Cheongsong County	Pacheon-myeon	
Cheongsong IC	청송 나들목	Dangjin-Yeongdeok Expressway	Cheongsong County	Pacheon-myeon	
Pacheon-myeon Office Songgang Bridge Songgang Elementary School (Closed)	파천면사무소 송강교 송강초등학교 (폐교)		Cheongsong County	Pacheon-myeon	
Jinan IS	진안사거리	National Route 34 (Gyeongdong-ro); Jinan-ro	Cheongsong County	Jinbo-myeon	National Route 34 overlap
Gaksan IS	각산사머리	Jinbo-ro	Cheongsong County	Jinbo-myeon	National Route 34 overlap
Woljeon IS	월전삼거리	National Route 34 (Gyeongdong-ro)	Cheongsong County	Jinbo-myeon	National Route 34 overlap
No name	(이름 없음)	Prefectural Route 911 (Seokbo-ro)	Yeongyang County	Ibam-myeon	Prefectural Route 911 overlap
Heunggu Bridge Goguryeongjae	흥구교 고구령재		Yeongyang County	Ibam-myeon	Prefectural Route 911 overlap
Goguryeongjae IS	고구령재삼거리	Maryeongsanhae-ro	Yeongyang County	Ibam-myeon	Prefectural Route 911 overlap
Ibam Bridge IS	입암교삼거리	Prefectural Route 911 (Cheonggi-ro)	Yeongyang County	Ibam-myeon	Prefectural Route 911 overlap
Ibam Elementary School Yeongyang Pepper Exhibition Hall Yeongyang Mountain Village Museum	입암초등학교 영양고추홍보전시관 영양산촌생활박물관		Yeongyang County	Ibam-myeon	
Gamcheon 1 Bridge Gamcheon 2 Bridge	감천1교 감천2교		Yeongyang County	Yeongyang-eup	
No name	(이름 없음)	Jungang-ro	Yeongyang County	Yeongyang-eup	
Samji Bridge	삼지교	Prefectural Route 918 (Yeongyangchangsu-ro)	Yeongyang County	Yeongyang-eup	for Samji-ri and Yeondaeam Temple
No name	(이름 없음)	Prefectural Route 918 (Jungang-ro)	Yeongyang County	Yeongyang-eup	Prefectural Route 918 overlap
Irwol IS	일월삼거리	Prefectural Route 918 (Jaeil-ro)	Yeongyang County	Irwol-myeon	Prefectural Route 918 overlap
Irwol Health Center Irwol Elementary School Irwol-myeon Office	일월보건지소 일월초등학교 일월면사무소		Yeongyang County	Irwol-myeon	
Seomchon Bridge Deokbong Bridge Chilseong Bridge	섬촌교 덕봉교 칠성교		Yeongyang County	Irwol-myeon	
Munam IS	문암삼거리	National Route 88 (Hani-ro)	Yeongyang County	Irwol-myeon	Prefectural Route 88 overlap
Irwolsan Wildflower Park	일월산자생화공원		Yeongyang County	Irwol-myeon	Prefectural Route 88 overlap
Yeongyang Tunnel	영양터널		Yeongyang County	Irwol-myeon	Prefectural Route 88 overlap Approximately 600 m
Yeongyang Tunnel			Yeongyang County	Subi-myeon	Prefectural Route 88 overlap Approximately 600 m
Hoeryeongcheon	회룡천		Yeongyang County	Subi-myeon	Prefectural Route 88 overlap
Hoeryeongcheon			Bonghwa County	Jaesan-myeon	Prefectural Route 88 overlap
Bonghwa Tunnel	봉화터널		Bonghwa County	Jaesan-myeon	Prefectural Route 88 overlap Approximately 782 m
Gonggijae IS	공이재삼거리	Prefectural Route 933 (Jaesan-ro)	Bonghwa County	Socheon-myeon	Prefectural Route 88 overlap
Imgi Bridge	임기교		Bonghwa County	Socheon-myeon	Prefectural Route 88 overlap
Beopjeon 1 Bridge	법전1교	National Route 35; National Route 36; National Route 88 (Socheon-ro)	Bonghwa County	Beopjeon-myeon	National Route 35, National Route 36 overlap Prefectural Route 88 overlap
Norujae Tunnel	노루재터널		Bonghwa County	Beopjeon-myeon	National Route 35, National Route 36 overlap Approximately 1,700 m
Norujae Tunnel			Bonghwa County	Socheon-myeon	
Hyeon IS	현동 교차로		Bonghwa County	Socheon-myeon	Under construction
Hyeon 1 IS	현동1 교차로	National Route 36 (Socheon-ro)	Bonghwa County	Socheon-myeon	National Route 35, National Route 36 overlap
Socheon Middle School Socheon High School	소천중학교 소천고등학교		Bonghwa County	Socheon-myeon	National Route 35 overlap
Hyeon IS	현동삼거리	Socheon-ro	Bonghwa County	Socheon-myeon	National Route 35 overlap
Neotjae	넛재		Bonghwa County	Socheon-myeon	National Route 35 overlap Elevation 896 m
Neotjae			Bonghwa County	Seokpo-myeon	National Route 35 overlap Elevation 896 m
Cheongoksan Natural Recreation Forest	청옥산 자연휴양림		Bonghwa County	Seokpo-myeon	National Route 35 overlap Continuation into Gangwon Province
Yuksongjeong IS	육송정삼거리	Prefectural Route 910 (Cheongok-ro)	Bonghwa County	Seokpo-myeon	National Route 35 overlap Continuation into Gangwon Province

=== Gangwon Province ===
Name	Hangul name	Connection	Location		Note
Dongjeom Station	동점역		Taebaek City	Gumoonso-dong	National Route 35 overlap North Gyeongsang Province–Gangwon Province border
Gumoonso IS	구문소삼거리	Dongtaebaeng-ro	Taebaek City	Gumoonso-dong	National Route 35 overlap North Gyeongsang Province–Gangwon Province border
Dongjeom Tunnel	동점터널		Taebaek City	Gumoonso-dong	National Route 35 overlap Approximately 89.5 m
Taebaek Paleozoic Museum	태백고생대자연사박물관		Taebaek City	Gumoonso-dong	National Route 35 overlap
Jangseong IS	장성 교차로		Taebaek City	Gumoonso-dong	Under construction
Sintaebaek Bridge Munhwa Bridge	신태백교 문화교		Taebaek City	Gumoonso-dong	National Route 35 overlap
Munhwa Bridge	문화교 북단	Jangseong-ro; Memildeul 1-gil	Taebaek City	Gumoonso-dong	National Route 35 overlap
Jangseong Tunnel	장성터널		Taebaek City	Gumoonso-dong	National Route 35 overlap Approximately 450 m
Jangseong Tunnel			Taebaek City	Jangseong-dong	National Route 35 overlap Approximately 450 m
Taebaek Elementary School	태백초등학교		Taebaek City	Jangseong-dong	National Route 35 overlap
Taebaek Stadium Gowon Gymnasium	태백종합경기장 고원체육관		Taebaek City	Mungoksodo-dong	National Route 35 overlap
Sangjang IS	상장삼거리	National Route 35 (Taebaek-ro)	Taebaek City	Sangjang-dong	National Route 35 overlap
Hamtae Middle School IS	함태중학교삼거리	Beonyeong-ro	Taebaek City	Sangjang-dong	
Mungoksodo-dong Community Center	문곡소도동주민센터	Cheonjedan-gil	Taebaek City	Mungoksodo-dong	
Baekdansa Entrance	백단사입구	Baekdansa-gil	Taebaek City	Mungoksodo-dong	
Yuilsa Entrance	유일사입구		Taebaek City	Mungoksodo-dong	
Hwabangjae	화방재	Prefectural Route 414 (Hambaeksan-ro)	Taebaek City	Mungoksodo-dong	
Cheonpyeong Bridge	천평교		Taebaek City	Mungoksodo-dong	
Cheonpyeong Bridge			Yeongwol County	Sangdong-eup	
Sangdong IS	상동삼거리	Gurae-ro	Yeongwol County	Sangdong-eup	
Sangdong-eup Office	상동읍사무소		Yeongwol County	Sangdong-eup	
Sangdong Middle School Sangdong High School	상동중학교 상동고등학교		Yeongwol County	Sangdong-eup	
Bongujae IS	봉우재삼거리	Seonbawi-gil	Yeongwol County	Sangdong-eup	
Naedeok Bridge	내덕교		Yeongwol County	Sangdong-eup	
Naedeok IS	내덕삼거리	Deokgu-ro	Yeongwol County	Sangdong-eup	
Naedeok IS	내덕 교차로	Seomjigol-gil	Yeongwol County	Sangdong-eup	
Jikdong IS	직동삼거리	Jikdong-ro	Yeongwol County	Jungdong-myeon	
Nokjeon IS	녹전 교차로	Taebaeksan-ro	Yeongwol County	Jungdong-myeon	
Nokjeon 1 Bridge	녹전1교		Yeongwol County	Jungdong-myeon	
Jungdong IS	중동 교차로	Eunggogae-gil	Yeongwol County	Jungdong-myeon	
Nokjeon 2 Bridge	녹전2교		Yeongwol County	Jungdong-myeon	
Nokjeon Tunnel	녹전터널		Yeongwol County	Jungdong-myeon	Approximately 200 m
Imok 1 Bridge	이목1교		Yeongwol County	Jungdong-myeon	
Imok Tunnel	이목터널		Yeongwol County	Jungdong-myeon	Approximately 95 m
Imok 2 Bridge	이목2교		Yeongwol County	Jungdong-myeon	
Imok IS	이목 교차로	Prefectural Route 28 (Taebaeksan-ro)	Yeongwol County	Jungdong-myeon	Prefectural Route 28 overlap
Garinae IS	가리내 교차로	Taebaeksan-ro	Yeongwol County	Jungdong-myeon	Prefectural Route 28 overlap
Surari Tunnel	수라리터널		Yeongwol County	Jungdong-myeon	Prefectural Route 28 overlap Approximately 869 m (Elevation 600 m)
Hwara IS	화라 교차로		Yeongwol County	Jungdong-myeon	Prefectural Route 28 overlap
Seokhang IS	석항삼거리	Yeongwol-ro	Yeongwol County	Jungdong-myeon	Prefectural Route 28 overlap
Yeongwol Elementary School Yeonsang Branch School	영월초등학교 연상분교		Yeongwol County	Jungdong-myeon	Prefectural Route 28 overlap
Yeonsang IS	연상삼거리	Yeongwol-ro	Yeongwol County	Jungdong-myeon	Prefectural Route 28 overlap
Seokhang IS	석항 교차로	National Route 38; National Route 59; Prefectural Route 28 (Gangwonnam-ro)	Yeongwol County	Jungdong-myeon	National Route 38, National Route 59 overlap Prefectural Route 28 overlap
Seokhang 2 Tunnel	석항2터널		Yeongwol County	Jungdong-myeon	National Route 38, National Route 59 overlap Right tunnel: Approximately 404 m Left tunnel: Approximately 325 m
Yeonsang Bridge	연상교		Yeongwol County	Jungdong-myeon	National Route 38, National Route 59 overlap
Seokhang 1 Tunnel	석항1터널		Yeongwol County	Jungdong-myeon	National Route 38, National Route 59 overlap Right tunnel: Approximately 990 m Left tunnel: Approximately 980 m
Seokhang 1 Tunnel			Yeongwol County	Yeongwol-eup	National Route 38, National Route 59 overlap Right tunnel: Approximately 990 m Left tunnel: Approximately 980 m
Yeonha Bridge	연하대교		Yeongwol County	Yeongwol-eup	National Route 38, National Route 59 overlap
Yeonha IS	연하 교차로	Yeongwol-ro	Yeongwol County	Yeongwol-eup	National Route 38, National Route 59 overlap
Bansong Tunnel	반송터널		Yeongwol County	Yeongwol-eup	National Route 38, National Route 59 overlap Right tunnel: Approximately 220 m Left tunnel: Approximately 265 m
Bansong Bridge Saetdol Bridge Dupyeong Bridge	반송교 샛돌교 두평교		Yeongwol County	Yeongwol-eup	National Route 38, National Route 59 overlap
Dongyeongwol IS	동영월 교차로	National Route 38; National Route 59 (Gangwonnam-ro); Yeongwol-ro	Yeongwol County	Yeongwol-eup	National Route 38, National Route 59 overlap
Tanbu Station	탄부역		Yeongwol County	Yeongwol-eup	
Donggang IS	동강 교차로	Donggang-ro	Yeongwol County	Yeongwol-eup	
Eorayeon Entrance	어라연입구	Donggang-ro	Yeongwol County	Yeongwol-eup	
Yeongwol Station	영월역 (영월역앞)		Yeongwol County	Yeongwol-eup	
Deokpo IS	덕포사거리	Jungang-ro	Yeongwol County	Yeongwol-eup	
Deokpo IS	덕포삼거리	Deokpo Underpass	Yeongwol County	Yeongwol-eup	
Donggang Bridge	동강대교		Yeongwol County	Yeongwol-eup	
Yeongheung IS	영흥사거리	Jebangan-gil	Yeongwol County	Yeongwol-eup	
Hasong IS	하송사거리	Jungang 1-ro Eunhaengnamu-gil	Yeongwol County	Yeongwol-eup	
Guncheong IS	군청사거리	Hasong-ro	Yeongwol County	Yeongwol-eup	
Yeongwol Public Stadium Yeongwol National Forest Service Office Yeongwol Weather Station Yeongwol Office of Education	영월공설운동장 영월국유림관리소 영월기상대 영월교육지원청		Yeongwol County	Yeongwol-eup	
Cheongnyeongpo Entrance	청령포입구	Cheongnyeongpo-ro	Yeongwol County	Yeongwol-eup	
Yeongwol Fire Station	영월소방서		Yeongwol County	Yeongwol-eup	
Jangneung IS (Jangneung)	장릉삼거리 (장릉)	Danjong-ro	Yeongwol County	Yeongwol-eup	
Sonagijae	소나기재		Yeongwol County	Yeongwol-eup	Elevation 320 m
Sonagijae			Yeongwol County	Buk-myeon	Elevation 320 m
Yeongwol IS	영월삼거리	Yeongwol-ro	Yeongwol County	Buk-myeon	
Ganggu IS	강구삼거리		Yeongwol County	Buk-myeon	
Mungok IS	문곡삼거리	Prefectural Route 415 (Bamjae-ro)	Yeongwol County	Buk-myeon	
Wondong IS	원동 교차로	Wondong-ro	Yeongwol County	Buk-myeon	
Wondongjae	원동재		Yeongwol County	Buk-myeon	Elevation 400 m
Wondongjae			Pyeongchang County	Pyeongchang-eup	Elevation 400 m
Maji IS	마지삼거리	Prefectural Route 82 (Pyeongchanggang-ro)	Pyeongchang County	Pyeongchang-eup	
Dodon Bridge	도돈교		Pyeongchang County	Pyeongchang-eup	
Iptan IS	입탄삼거리	Deuldun-gil	Pyeongchang County	Pyeongchang-eup	
Hari IS	하리삼거리	National Route 42 (Seodong-ro)	Pyeongchang County	Pyeongchang-eup	National Route 42 overlap
Hupyeong IS	후평사거리	Pyeongchangjungang-ro; Salgusil-gil	Pyeongchang County	Pyeongchang-eup	National Route 42 overlap
Dasu IS	다수삼거리	Okgogae-gil	Pyeongchang County	Pyeongchang-eup	National Route 42 overlap
Jujin Bridge	주진교		Pyeongchang County	Pyeongchang-eup	National Route 42 overlap
Jujin IS	주진삼거리	Nonggongdanji-gil	Pyeongchang County	Pyeongchang-eup	National Route 42 overlap
Baetjae	뱃재		Pyeongchang County	Pyeongchang-eup	National Route 42 overlap Elevation 470 m
Baetjae			Pyeongchang County	Bangrim-myeon	National Route 42 overlap Elevation 470 m
Bangrim IS	방림삼거리	National Route 42 (Seodong-ro)	Pyeongchang County	Bangrim-myeon	National Route 42 overlap
Bangrim IS	방림 교차로		Pyeongchang County	Bangrim-myeon	Under construction
Anmi Bridge	안미교		Pyeongchang County	Bangrim-myeon	
Anmi Bridge			Pyeongchang County	Daehwa-myeon	
Haanmi IS	하안미사거리	Prefectural Route 424 (Gapyeong-ro)	Pyeongchang County	Daehwa-myeon	
Haanmi IS	하안미삼거리	Haanmi-gil	Pyeongchang County	Daehwa-myeon	
Daehwa IS	대화삼거리	Daehwajungang-ro	Pyeongchang County	Daehwa-myeon	
Daehwa Bridge	대화교		Pyeongchang County	Daehwa-myeon	
Daehwa Bus Terminal	대화버스터미널		Pyeongchang County	Daehwa-myeon	
Daehwa IS	대화사거리	Daehwajungang-ro; Deonjitgol-gil	Pyeongchang County	Daehwa-myeon	
Daehwa IS	대화 교차로		Pyeongchang County	Daehwa-myeon	
Sinri IS	신리삼거리	Moritjae-ro	Pyeongchang County	Daehwa-myeon	
Sinri IS	신리 교차로		Pyeongchang County	Daehwa-myeon	
Jaesanjae	재산재		Pyeongchang County	Daehwa-myeon	Elevation 600 m
Jaesanjae			Pyeongchang County	Yongpyeong-myeon	Elevation 600 m
No name	(이름 없음)	Geumdang-gil	Pyeongchang County	Yongpyeong-myeon	
No name	(이름 없음)	National Route 6 (Gyeonggang-ro)	Pyeongchang County	Yongpyeong-myeon	National Route 6 overlap
Jangpyeong Intercity Bus Terminal	장평시외버스터미널		Pyeongchang County	Yongpyeong-myeon	National Route 6 overlap
Yongpyeong-myeon Office	용평면사무소		Pyeongchang County	Yongpyeong-myeon	National Route 6 overlap
Soksa IC	속사 나들목	Yeongdong Expressway	Pyeongchang County	Yongpyeong-myeon	National Route 6 overlap
Soksa IS	속사삼거리	National Route 6 (Gyeonggang-ro)	Pyeongchang County	Yongpyeong-myeon	National Route 6 overlap
Soksa Elementary School	속사초등학교		Pyeongchang County	Yongpyeong-myeon	
Lee Seung-bok Memorial Center	이승복기념관		Pyeongchang County	Yongpyeong-myeon	
Unduryeong	운두령		Pyeongchang County	Yongpyeong-myeon	Elevation 1,089 m
Unduryeong			Hongcheon County	Nae-myeon	Elevation 1,089 m
Jaun IS	자운 교차로	Prefectural Route 424 (Boraeryeong-ro)	Hongcheon County	Nae-myeon	
Changchon IS	창촌삼거리	National Route 56; Prefectural Route 56 (Guryongnyeong-ro)	Hongcheon County	Nae-myeon	National Route 56 overlap Prefectural Route 56 overlap
Sangbaetjae	상뱃재		Hongcheon County	Nae-myeon	National Route 56 overlap Prefectural Route 56 overlap Elevation 886 m
Yuljeon IS (Yuljeon Elementary School)	율전삼거리 (율전초등학교)	National Route 56 overlap Prefectural Route 56 (Guryongnyeong-ro)	Hongcheon County	Nae-myeon	National Route 56 overlap Prefectural Route 56 overlap
Gosarijae	고사리재		Hongcheon County	Nae-myeon	Elevation 700 m
Gosarijae			Inje County	Sangnam-myeon	Elevation 700 m
Goseokpyeong Bridge	고석평교	Prefectural Route 451 (Ahopsari-ro)	Inje County	Sangnam-myeon	
Sangnam Bridge	상남교	Prefectural Route 446 (Naerincheon-ro)	Inje County	Sangnam-myeon	Prefectural Route 446 overlap
Sangnam bus stop	상남정류장		Inje County	Sangnam-myeon	Prefectural Route 446 overlap
Sangnam IS	상남삼거리	Prefectural Route 446 (Gimbudaewang-ro)	Inje County	Sangnam-myeon	Prefectural Route 446 overlap
Omijaegogae	오미재고개		Inje County	Sangnam-myeon	Elevation 500 m
Hanam Elementary School	하남초등학교		Inje County	Sangnam-myeon	
Inje IC	인제 나들목	Seoul–Yangyang Expressway	Inje County	Sangnam-myeon	Under construction
Yongpo Bridge	용포교		Inje County	Sangnam-myeon	
Yongpo Bridge			Inje County	Girin-myeon	
Jinbang IS	진방삼거리	Prefectural Route 418 (Jochimnyeong-ro)	Inje County	Girin-myeon	
Hyeonri Bus Terminal Girin Elementary School	현리버스터미널 기린초등학교		Inje County	Girin-myeon	
No name	(이름 없음)	Hanseoksan-ro	Inje County	Girin-myeon	
Hadap Bridge	하답교	Sanghadap-ro	Inje County	Girin-myeon	
Hachu Bridge	하추교	Hachu-ro	Inje County	Inje-eup	
Wondae IS	원대삼거리	Wonnam-ro	Inje County	Inje-eup	
Piam Tunnel	(피암터널)		Inje County	Inje-eup	Approximately 80 m
Hapgang IS	합강삼거리	Deoksan-ro	Inje County	Inje-eup	
Hapgang Bridge	합강교		Inje County	Inje-eup	
Hapgang IS	합강 교차로	National Route 44; National Route 46 (Seorak-ro)	Inje County	Inje-eup	National Route 44, National Route 46 overlap
Deoksan IS	덕산 교차로	Hanseoksan-ro	Inje County	Inje-eup	National Route 44, National Route 46 overlap
Bukmyeon IS	북면 교차로	National Route 44; National Route 46 (Seorak-ro); Prefectural Route 453 (Wontong-ro)	Inje County	Inje-eup	National Route 44, National Route 46 overlap
Gaapiam Tunnel	가아피암터널		Inje County	Inje-eup	Approximately 110 m
Gwangchi Tunnel	광치터널		Inje County	Inje-eup	Approximately 570 m (Elevation 660 m)
Gwangchi Tunnel			Yanggu County	Nam-myeon	Approximately 570 m (Elevation 660 m)
Gaojak Bridge	가오작교		Yanggu County	Nam-myeon	
No name	(이름 없음)	Namdong-ro	Yanggu County	Nam-myeon	
Yachon IS	야촌 교차로	Jeongjungang-ro	Yanggu County	Nam-myeon	
Gao Bridge	가오교		Yanggu County	Nam-myeon	
Yongha 1 Bridge	용하1 교차로	Yangnam-ro	Yanggu County	Nam-myeon	
Sinsongu Bridge Seocheon 2 Bridge	신송우교 서천2교		Yanggu County	Nam-myeon	
Hwanggang Tunnel	황강터널		Yanggu County	Nam-myeon	Approximately 285 m
Hwanggang Bridge	황강교		Yanggu County	Nam-myeon	
Hwanggang IS	황강 교차로	Hwanggang-gil	Yanggu County	Nam-myeon	
Nammyeon Bridge Seocheon 1 Bridge	남면교 서천1교		Yanggu County	Nam-myeon	
Songcheong IS	송청 교차로	National Route 46 (Jeongjungang-ro) (Chunyang-ro)	Yanggu County	Nam-myeon	
Songcheonje 2 Bridge	송청제2교		Yanggu County	Nam-myeon	
Songcheonje 2 Bridge			Yanggu County	Yanggu-eup	
No name	(이름 없음)	Jungsim-ro	Yanggu County	Yanggu-eup	
Jeongrim Bridge	정림교 동단	Prefectural Route 403 (Yanggusaessak-ro)	Yanggu County	Yanggu-eup	
No name	(이름 없음)	Yangrok-gil	Yanggu County	Yanggu-eup	
Hari IS	하리삼거리	Bibong-ro	Yanggu County	Yanggu-eup	
Gangwon Foreign Language High School	강원외국어고등학교		Yanggu County	Yanggu-eup	
Jukgok IS	죽곡삼거리	Jukgok-ro	Yanggu County	Yanggu-eup	
Jukgok Bridge	죽곡교	Seonggok-ro	Yanggu County	Yanggu-eup	
Hanjeon IS	한전삼거리	Jukgok-ro 73beon-gil	Yanggu County	Yanggu-eup	
Hanjeon Elementary School	한전초등학교		Yanggu County	Yanggu-eup	
Dosa Bridge	도사교 동단	Dosari-gil	Yanggu County	Yanggu-eup	
No name	(이름 없음)	Prefectural Route 460 (Pyeonghwa-ro)	Yanggu County	Yanggu-eup	
Imdang Elementary School Dong-myeon Office	임당초등학교 동면사무소		Yanggu County	Dong-myeon	
No name	(이름 없음)	Prefectural Route 453 (Peonchibol-ro)	Yanggu County	Dong-myeon	
Battle of Bloody Ridge Monument	피의능선전투전적비		Yanggu County	Dong-myeon	
Wolun-ri Imdang-ri Bia-ri Satae-ri	월운리 임당리 비아리 사태리		Yanggu County	Dong-myeon	CIVILIAN CONTROL ZONE (CCZ); Terminus
Continuation into North Korea
