= Goseong Nam clan =

Korean clan from North Gyeongsang Province

- Country: Korea
- Current region: Goseong County, South Gyeongsang
- Founder: Nam Gwang bo

Goseong Nam clan (Korean: 고성 남씨; Hanja: 固城 南氏) was one of the Korean clans. Their Bon-gwan was in Yeongyang County, North Gyeongsang Province. According to the research in 2015, the number of Goseong Nam clan was 10801. Their founder was Nam Gwang bo. Nam Gwang bo was a 3rd son of Nam Jin yong (Hanja: 南鎭勇). Nam Jin yong (Hanja: 南鎭勇) was a 7th descendant of Nam Min who was a civil servant in Tang dynasty. Nam Min was dispatched to Japan as an embassy but he had a shipwreck during the trip and then was naturalized in Silla.

== See also ==
- Korean clan names of foreign origin
