= Yeongyang Kim clan =

Korean clan from North Gyeongsang Province

- Country: Korea
- Current region: Yeongyang County
- Founder: Kim Chung

Yeongyang Kim clan (Korean: 영양 김씨; Hanja: 英陽 金氏) was one of the Korean clans. Their Bon-gwan was in Yeongyang County, North Gyeongsang Province. According to the research in 2000, the number of Yeongyang Kim clan was 7462. Their founder was Kim Chung, Bureaucrat in Tang dynasty. He was dispatched to Japan as an embassy, but the ship he rode was wrecked. Then, he was naturalized in Silla. He changed his name to Nam Min (Hanja: 南敏) because he was given "Nam" from the region's name “Runan (Hanja: 汝南)” as a surname from Gyeongdeok of Silla. Seok jung (Hanja: 錫中), a Nam Min (Hanja: 南敏)'s son, was settled in Yeongyang County and began Yeongyang Kim clan using the original clan's name Kim clan.

== See also ==
- Korean clan names of foreign origin
