= Seoul–Yangyang Expressway =

Road in South Korea

Expressway No.60
- Seoul-Yangyang Expressway

Route information
- Length: 150.2 km (93.3 mi)
- Existed: 2009–present

Major junctions
- West end: Gangil IC, Seoul
- East end: Yangyang Junction, Yangyang

Location
- Country: South Korea

Highway system
- Highway systems of South Korea; Expressways; National; Local

- Seoul–Yangyang Expressway
- Hangul: 서울양양고속도로
- Hanja: 서울襄陽高速道路
- RR: Seoul Yangyang gosok doro
- MR: Sŏul Yangyang kosok toro

The Seoul–Yangyang Expressway (Korean: 서울양양고속도로) is an expressway in South Korea, connecting the cities of Seoul and Yangyang County. It is 78.5 kilometers long, with two lanes of traffic in each direction and ten interchanges. It shares the number "60" and operates by Seoul-Chuncheon Highway Corporation, as a privately financed toll road. The extension to the end at the eastcoast is to be opened June 30, 2017.

The estimated travel time between the two cities is roughly 40 minutes, saving about more than half of the previous travel time on the National Road No.46. Because the toll road was considered to be "privately funded", the toll for a passenger car is 5,900 won. After several complaints from the people and organizations of northwestern Gangwon, the toll for a user living in Chuncheon City and its surrounding region was reduced to 5,200 won.

Construction was completed on July 15, 2009, with an active passenger-passing and its official opening ceremony held on the same day, at a total cost of slightly over 2 trillion won. According to the South Korean Governmental decision made in December 2002, its original name is Seoul-Yangyang Expressway, however, it will be expanded completely on 2014, because, though the construction of a phase from Chuncheon Junction to East Hongcheon Interchange finished (earlier than expected) on October 30, 2009, by public-funded KEC, its last phase, East Hongcheon to Yangyang has been started in May 2009.

Gapyeong County Bus No. 8004, Gwangju Urban Bus No. 8002, and Namyangju Urban Bus No. 8012 use this highway.

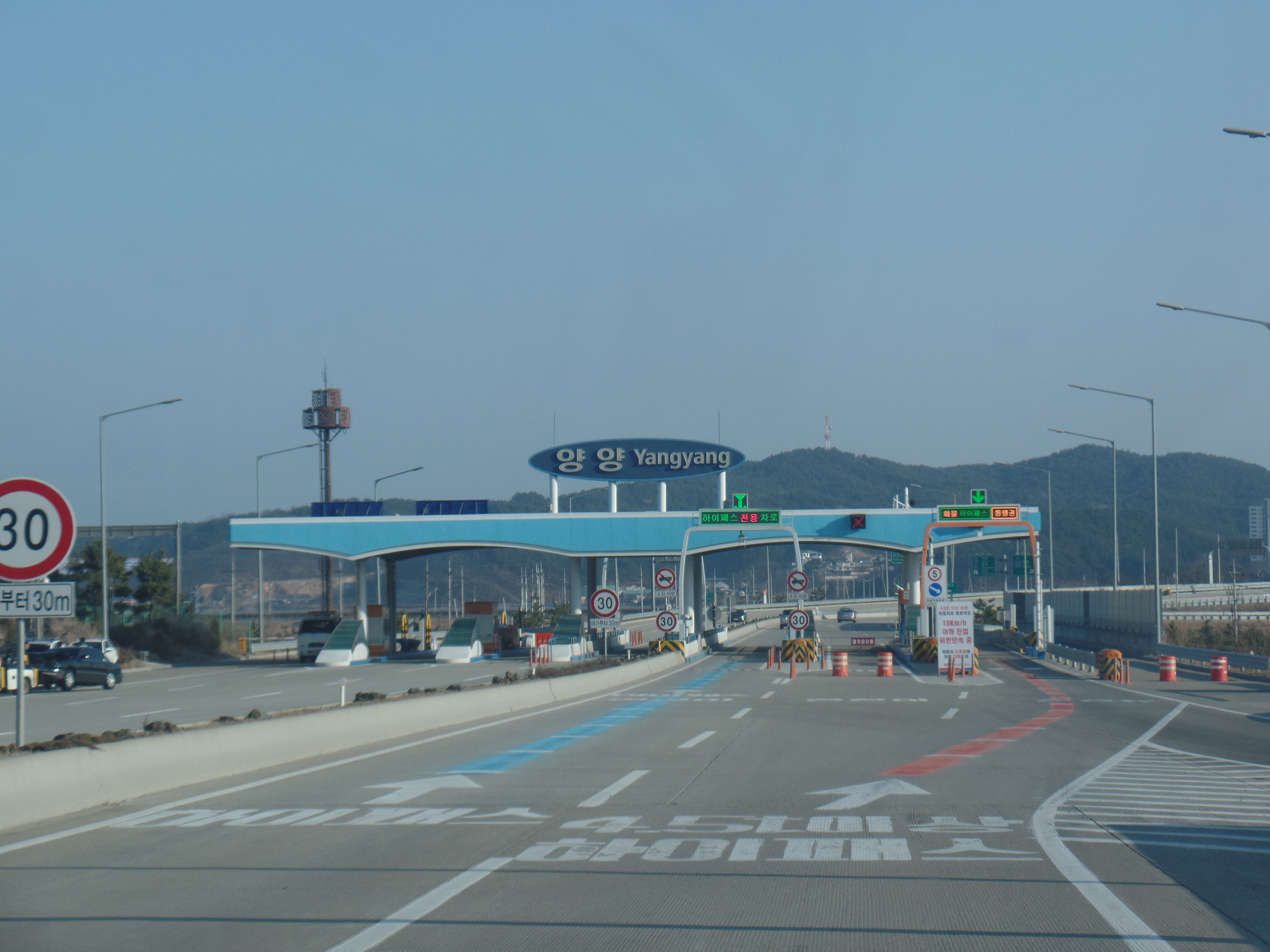
Yangyang IC Tollgate.

It has the longest road tunnel in South Korea, Inje-Yangyang Tunnel.

== List of facilities ==
- IC: Interchange, JC: Junction, SA: Service Area, TG:Tollgate

No.	Name	Korean name	Hanja name	Connections	Distance		Notes	Location	
Connected directly with Olympicdaero(올림픽대로)
	Seoul	서울 시점	서울 始點	Olympicdaero	-	0.00	Expressway Start Spot	Gangdong	Seoul
	Gangil IC	강일 나들목	江一나들목	Seoul Ring Expressway	0.96	0.96		Gangdong	Seoul
	Seondong IC	선동나들목	船洞나들목		0.96	1.92		Hanam	Gyeonggi
	Misa IC	미사나들목	渼沙나들목	Misa-daero	2.03	3.95	Seoul-bound Only	Hanam	Gyeonggi
1	Deokso·Sampae IC	덕소삼패나들목	德沼三牌나들목	National Route 6	10.91	14.86		Namyangju	Gyeonggi
TG	Namyangju TG	남양주요금소	南楊州料金所		-	-	Main Tollgate	Namyangju	Gyeonggi
2	Hwado IC	화도나들목	和道나들목	National Route 46	10.91	14.86		Namyangju	Gyeonggi
2-1	Hwado JC	화도분기점	和道分岐點	Sudogwon Je2sunhwan Expressway	-	-			Gyeonggi
3	Seojong IC	서종나들목	西宗나들목	Provincial Route 391	5.30	20.16		Yangpyeong	Gyeonggi
4	Seorak IC	설악나들목	雪岳나들목	National Route 37	12.88	33.04		Gapyeong	Gyeonggi
SA	Gapyeong SA	가평휴게소	加平休憩所		-	-		Gapyeong	Gyeonggi
5	Gangchon IC	강촌나들목	江村나들목	Provincial Route 403	14.20	47.24		Chuncheon	Gangwon
6	S. Chuncheon IC	남춘천나들목	南春川나들목	Provincial Route 70; Provincial Route 86	9.03	56.27		Chuncheon	Gangwon
TG	Dongsan TG	동산요금소	東山料金所		-	-	Yangyang-bound Only	Chuncheon	Gangwon
7	Joyang IC	조양나들목	朝陽나들목	National Route 5	5.50	61.77		Chuncheon	Gangwon
8	Chuncheon JC	춘천분기점	春川分岐點	Jungang Expressway	0.44	62.21		Chuncheon	Gangwon
9	E. Hongcheon IC	동홍천나들목	東洪川나들목	National Route 44	16.24	78.44		Hongcheon	Gangwon
SA	Hongcheon SA	홍천휴게소	洪川休憩所					Hongcheon	Gangwon
10	Naechon IC	내촌나들목	乃村나들목	Provincial Route 408	16.6			Hongcheon	Gangwon
11	Inje IC	인제나들목	麟蹄나들목	National Route 31	21.5			Inje	Gangwon
SA	Naerincheon SA	내린천휴게소	內麟川休憩所					Inje	Gangwon
12	Seorim IC	서림나들목	西林나들목	National Route 44; National Route 56; National Route 59	24.9			Yangyang	Gangwon
13	Yangyang JC	양양분기점	襄陽分岐點	Donghae Expressway	10.2			Yangyang	Gangwon
14	Yangyang IC	양양나들목	襄陽나들목	National Route 44; National Route 56				Yangyang	Gangwon

== See also ==
- Roads and expressways in South Korea
- Transport in South Korea
- Gangwon
- Chuncheon
- Gyeongchun Line, Railroad (operated by Korail)
