= National Route 44 (South Korea) =

Road in South Korea

National Route 44
- 국도 제44호선

Route information
- Length: 137.2 km (85.3 mi)
- Existed: 31 August 1971–present

Major junctions
- East end: Yangpyeong County, Gyeonggi Province
- West end: Yangyang County, Gangwon Province

Location
- Country: South Korea

Highway system
- Highway systems of South Korea; Expressways; National; Local

National Route 44 is a national highway in South Korea connects Yangpyeong County to Yangyang County. It established on 31 August 1971.

== Main stopovers ==
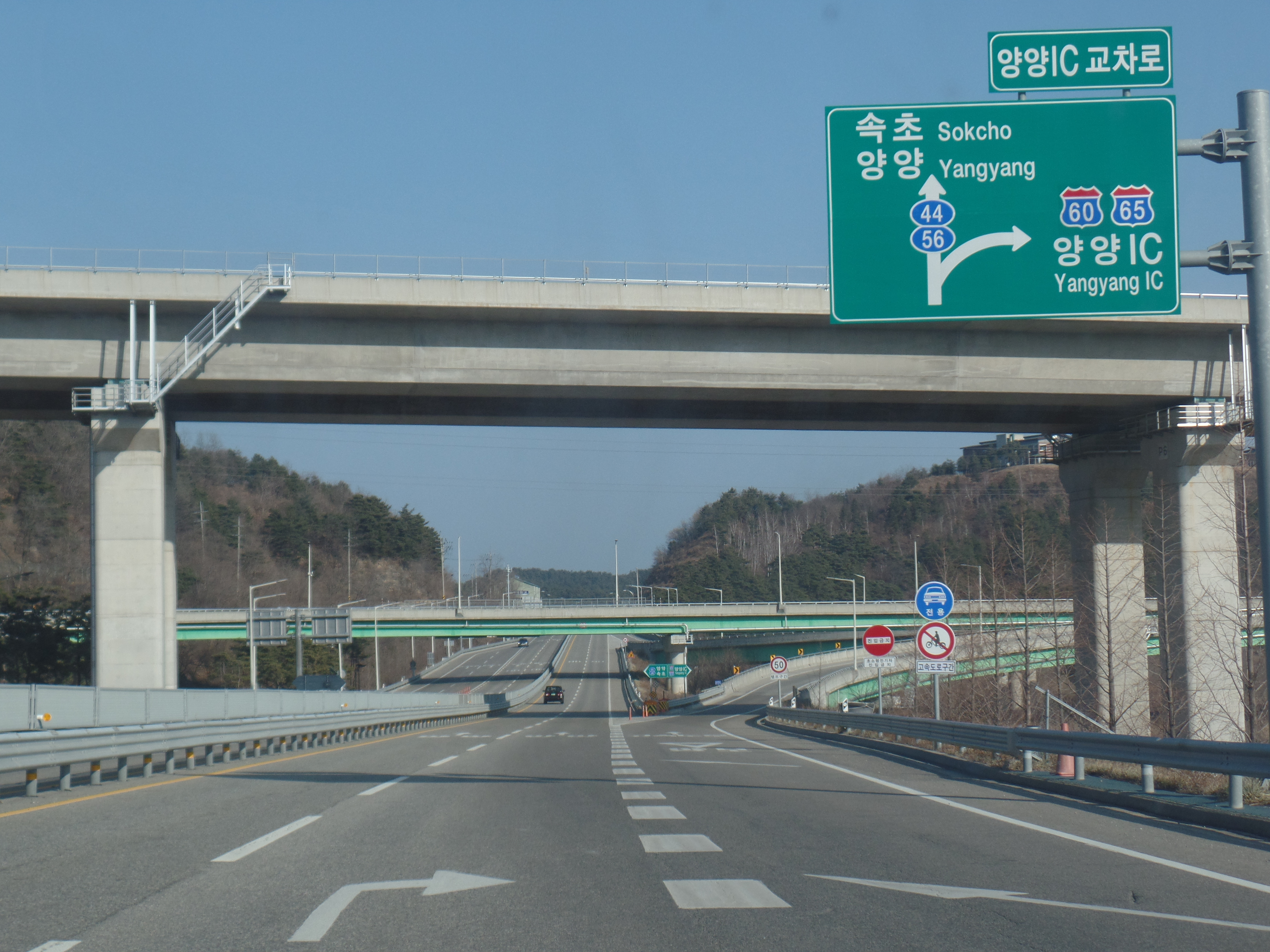
Yangyang IC entrance at Yangyang County

Gyeonggi Province

- Yangpyeong County

Gangwon Province

- Hongcheon County - Inje County - Yangyang County

== Major intersections ==
- (■): Motorway

IS: Intersection, IC: Interchange

=== Gyeonggi Province ===
Name	Hangul name	Connection	Location		Note
Sangpyeong IS	상평 교차로	National Route 37; Prefectural Route 98 (Mayusan-ro)	Yangpyeong County	Yangpyeong-eup	Terminus; National Route 6, National Route 37 overlap
Yangpyeong IS	양평 교차로	National Route 37 (Yeoju-Yangpyeong Motorway)	Yangpyeong County	Yangpyeong-eup	National Route 6, National Route 37 overlap
Yangpyeong Fire Station	양평소방서		Yangpyeong County	Yangpyeong-eup	National Route 6 overlap
Goheung Overpass	공흥육교	Baegun-gil	Yangpyeong County	Yangpyeong-eup	National Route 6 overlap
Baekdong Overpass	백동육교	Chorong-gil	Yangpyeong County	Yangpyeong-eup	National Route 6 overlap
Baekan Overpass	백안육교	Jungang-ro	Yangpyeong County	Yangpyeong-eup	National Route 6 overlap
Sinheung Overpass	신흥육교	Daeheung-ro	Yangpyeong County	Yangpyeong-eup	National Route 6 overlap
Yongmun Tunnel	용문터널		Yangpyeong County	Yongmun-myeon	National Route 6 overlap Right tunnel: Approximately 345m Left tunnel: Approximately 173m
Yongmun IS	용문 교차로	Garwol-gil	Yangpyeong County	Yongmun-myeon	National Route 6 overlap
Yongmun Bridge	용문교		Yangpyeong County	Yongmun-myeon	National Route 6 overlap
Maryong IS	마룡 교차로	Prefectural Route 341 (Yongmunsan-ro)	Yangpyeong County	Yongmun-myeon	National Route 6 overlap
Geumgok IS	금곡 교차로	Yongmun-ro	Yangpyeong County	Yongmun-myeon	National Route 6 overlap
Bongsang IS	봉상삼거리	Prefectural Route 70 (Yongmun-ro)	Yangpyeong County	Danwol-myeon	National Route 6 overlap Prefectural Route 70 overlap
Samga IS	삼가 교차로	Prefectural Route 345 (Yangdong-ro); Bongsang-gil	Yangpyeong County	Danwol-myeon	National Route 6 overlap Prefectural Route 70, 345 overlap
Danwol IS	단월 교차로	Boryong-gil	Yangpyeong County	Danwol-myeon	National Route 6 overlap Prefectural Route 70, 345 overlap
Boryong IS	보룡 교차로	Prefectural Route 70; Prefectural Route 345 (Danwol-ro)	Yangpyeong County	Danwol-myeon	National Route 6 overlap Prefectural Route 70, 345 overlap
Gyodong IS	교동 교차로	Baekdong-gil	Yangpyeong County	Cheongun-myeon	National Route 6 overlap
Biryong IS	비룡 교차로	Biryong 1-gil	Yangpyeong County	Cheongun-myeon	National Route 6 overlap
Yongdu IS	용두 교차로	National Route 6 (Gyeonggang-ro)	Yangpyeong County	Cheongun-myeon	National Route 6 overlap
Dadae IS	다대 교차로	Yongdu-ro	Yangpyeong County	Cheongun-myeon	
Samsung IS	삼성 교차로	Cheongunsamseongan-gil	Yangpyeong County	Cheongun-myeon	
Sindanggogae	신당고개		Yangpyeong County	Cheongun-myeon	Continuation into Gangwon Province

=== Gangwon Province ===
Name	Hangul name	Connection	Location		Note
Sindanggogae	신당고개		Hongcheon County	Nam-myeon	Gyeonggi Province - Gangwon Province border line
Yangdeok Middle School Gangwon Practical Science High School	양덕중학교 강원생활과학고등학교		Hongcheon County	Nam-myeon	
Yangdeokwon IS	양덕원 교차로	Yangdeokwon-ro	Hongcheon County	Nam-myeon	
Yangdeok 1 Bridge	양덕1교		Hongcheon County	Nam-myeon	
Wolcheon-ri IS	월천리삼거리	Yangdeokwon-ro	Hongcheon County	Nam-myeon	
Myeoneurigogae Tunnel	며느리고개터널		Hongcheon County	Nam-myeon	Right tunnel: Approximately 565m Left tunnel: Approximately 515m
Myeoneurigogae Tunnel			Hongcheon County	Hongcheon-eup	Right tunnel: Approximately 565m Left tunnel: Approximately 515m
Oan Elementary School	오안초등학교	Oan-ro	Hongcheon County	Hongcheon-eup	
Hongcheon IC	홍천 나들목	Jungang Expressway	Hongcheon County	Hongcheon-eup	
South of Dunji Bridge	둔지교 남단	Songhakjeong-ro	Hongcheon County	Hongcheon-eup	
Yeonbong IS	연봉 교차로	Mugunghwa-ro	Hongcheon County	Hongcheon-eup	
Yeonbong 1 Bridge	연봉1교	Jangjeonpyeong-ro	Hongcheon County	Hongcheon-eup	
Yeonbong 2 Bridge	연봉2교	Namsangangbyeon-ro	Hongcheon County	Hongcheon-eup	
South of Namsan Bridge	남산교 남단	Majigi-ro	Hongcheon County	Hongcheon-eup	
Hongcheon Culture and Arts Center	홍천문화예술회관		Hongcheon County	Hongcheon-eup	
Galmagok 1 Bridge	갈마곡1교	Prefectural Route 444 (Gongjaksan-ro)	Hongcheon County	Hongcheon-eup	
Galmagok 2 Bridge	갈마곡2교	Galun-ro	Hongcheon County	Hongcheon-eup	
Geomyul Bridge	검율교		Hongcheon County	Hongcheon-eup	
Wadong IS	와동 교차로	Wadong-ro	Hongcheon County	Hongcheon-eup	
Gulun IS	굴운 교차로	Gulun-ro	Hongcheon County	Hwachon-myeon	
Guseongpo IS	구성포 교차로	National Route 56; Prefectural Route 56 (Guryongnyeong-ro) (Garakjae-ro)	Hongcheon County	Hwachon-myeon	
East Hongcheon IC (Seongsan IS)	동홍천 나들목 (성산 교차로)	Seoul-Yangyang Expressway	Hongcheon County	Hwachon-myeon	
Wonpyeong IS	원평 교차로	Yasidae-ro	Hongcheon County	Hwachon-myeon	
Malgogae IS	말고개 교차로	Jueumchi-ro; Bumok-gil	Hongcheon County	Hwachon-myeon	
Seoljeong Tunnel	철정터널		Hongcheon County	Hwachon-myeon	Right tunnel: Approximately 330m Left tunnel: Approximately 345m
Seoljeong Tunnel			Hongcheon County	Duchon-myeon	Right tunnel: Approximately 330m Left tunnel: Approximately 345m
Cheoljeong IS	철정 교차로	Prefectural Route 451 (Ahopsari-ro)	Hongcheon County	Duchon-myeon	
Hyanggyogol IS	향교골 교차로	Hyanggyogol-gil	Hongcheon County	Duchon-myeon	
Chupyeong IS	추평 교차로	Garaedeul-gil	Hongcheon County	Duchon-myeon	
Garisan IS	가리산 교차로	Garisan-gil	Hongcheon County	Duchon-myeon	
Yeoknae IS	역내 교차로	Jaeun-ro	Hongcheon County	Duchon-myeon	
Duchon Bridge	두촌교		Hongcheon County	Duchon-myeon	
Yongsu IS	용소 교차로	Gyeongsu-gil	Hongcheon County	Duchon-myeon	
Jaeun IS	자은 교차로	Jaeun-ro	Hongcheon County	Duchon-myeon	
Wondong IS	원동 교차로	Prefectural Route 408 (Gwangseok-ro); Wondongjogyo-ro	Hongcheon County	Duchon-myeon	
Jangnam IS	장남 교차로	Namdeokdong-gil; Jangnam-gil	Hongcheon County	Duchon-myeon	
Wongeo IS	원거 교차로	Jangnam-gil	Hongcheon County	Duchon-myeon	
Geonnigogae	건니고개		Hongcheon County	Duchon-myeon	
Gwahundan IS	과훈단 교차로	Eungbong-gil	Inje County	Nam-myeon	
Aron Elementary School	어론초등학교		Inje County	Nam-myeon	
Eoron IS	어론 교차로	Eoron-gil	Inje County	Nam-myeon	
Damul IS	다물 교차로	Prefectural Route 446 (Gimbudaewang-ro)	Inje County	Nam-myeon	
Sinpung IS	신풍 교차로	Sinpung-gil	Inje County	Nam-myeon	
Sinnam IS	신남 교차로	National Route 46 (Sinnam-ro)	Inje County	Nam-myeon	
Sinnam Bridge	신남대교		Inje County	Nam-myeon	
Yumok IS	유목 교차로	National Route 46 (Sinnam-ro)	Inje County	Nam-myeon	National Route 46 overlap
Saemaeul IS	새마을교차로	Sidaekgol-gil	Inje County	Nam-myeon	National Route 46 overlap
Morubak IS	모루박교차로	Morubak-gil	Inje County	Nam-myeon	National Route 46 overlap
Bupyeong IS	부평교차로	Bupyeongjeongja-ro	Inje County	Nam-myeon	National Route 46 overlap
Bupyeong Bridge	부평교		Inje County	Nam-myeon	National Route 46 overlap
Maegogae	매고개		Inje County	Nam-myeon	National Route 46 overlap
Cheonggu IS	청구교차로		Inje County	Nam-myeon	National Route 46 overlap
Namjeon Bridge Namjeon IS	남전교 남전교차로	Gwandaedumu-ro	Inje County	Nam-myeon	National Route 46 overlap
No name	(이름 없음)	Sinsangchon-gil	Inje County	Nam-myeon	National Route 46 overlap
Inje Bridge	인제대교		Inje County	Nam-myeon	National Route 46 overlap
Inje Tunnel	인제터널		Inje County	Nam-myeon	National Route 46 overlap Right tunnel: Approximately 922m Left tunnel: Approximately 977m
Inje Tunnel			Inje County	Inje-eup	National Route 46 overlap Right tunnel: Approximately 922m Left tunnel: Approximately 977m
Inje Stadium	인제공설운동장	Inje-ro; Ganetgogae-gil	Inje County	Inje-eup	National Route 46 overlap
No name	(이름 없음)	Bibong-ro	Inje County	Inje-eup	National Route 46 overlap
Hapgang IS	합강교차로	National Route 31 (Naerincheon-ro); Inje-ro	Inje County	Inje-eup	National Route 31, National Route 46 overlap
Deoksan IS	덕산교차로	Hanseoksan-ro	Inje County	Inje-eup	National Route 31, National Route 46 overlap
Bukmyeon IS	북면교차로	National Route 31 (Gwangchiryeong-ro); Prefectural Route 453 (Wontong-ro)	Inje County	Inje-eup	National Route 31, National Route 46 overlap
Seoho Bridge	서호교		Inje County	Buk-myeon	National Route 46 overlap
No name	(이름 없음)	Geumgang-ro	Inje County	Buk-myeon	National Route 46 overlap
Wontong IS	원통교차로	Wontong-ro	Inje County	Buk-myeon	National Route 46 overlap
Gwanbeol IS	관벌교차로		Inje County	Buk-myeon	National Route 46 overlap
Hangye IS	한계교차로	National Route 46 (Misiryeong-ro)	Inje County	Buk-myeon	National Route 46 overlap
Oknyeo 1 Bridge Oknyeo 2 Bridge	옥녀1교 옥녀2교		Inje County	Buk-myeon	
Jangsudae	장수대		Inje County	Buk-myeon	
Hangyeryeong	한계령		Inje County	Buk-myeon	Elevation 920m
Hangyeryeong			Yangyang County	Seo-myeon	Elevation 920m
Pilryeyaksu Entrance	필례약수입구	Pillye-ro	Yangyang County	Seo-myeon	
Yongssopokpo Waterfall Entrance	용소폭포입구		Yangyang County	Seo-myeon	
Osaek Bus Terminal	오색버스터미널		Yangyang County	Seo-myeon	
Osaek Elementary School	오색초등학교		Yangyang County	Seo-myeon	
Osaek 1 IS	오색1 교차로		Yangyang County	Seo-myeon	
Namseolak Bridge	남설악교		Yangyang County	Seo-myeon	
Namseolak Tunnel	남설악터널		Yangyang County	Seo-myeon	Approximately 815m
Nonhwa IS	논화 교차로	National Route 56; Prefectural Route 56 (Guryongnyeong-ro); Ssangsolbaegi-gil	Yangyang County	Seo-myeon	National Route 56 overlap Prefectural Route 56 overlap
Sangpyeong IS	상평 교차로	Gombat-gil	Yangyang County	Seo-myeon	National Route 56 overlap Prefectural Route 56 overlap
Yangyang IC	양양 나들목	Seoul-Yangyang Expressway; Donghae Expressway	Yangyang County	Seo-myeon	National Route 56 overlap Prefectural Route 56 overlap
Imcheon IS	임천 교차로	Geomacheon-ro; Imcheon-gil; Yangyang-ro	Yangyang County	Yangyang-eup	National Route 56 overlap Prefectural Route 56 overlap
Gugyo IS	구교 교차로	Bukmun-gil; Hangogae-gil	Yangyang County	Yangyang-eup	National Route 56 overlap Prefectural Route 56 overlap
Cheonggok IS	청곡 교차로	National Route 7 Prefectural Route 56 (Donghae-daero)	Yangyang County	Yangyang-eup	National Route 56 overlap Prefectural Route 56 overlap Terminus
