= National Route 6 (South Korea) =

Road in South Korea

National Route 6
- 국도 제6호선

Route information
- Length: 274.3 km (170.4 mi)
- Existed: 31 August 1971–present

Major junctions
- West end: Jung-gu, Incheon; National Route 42; National Route 46; National Route 77
- East end: Gangneung, Gangwon Province; National Route 7

Location
- Country: South Korea

Highway system
- Highway systems of South Korea; Expressways; National; Local

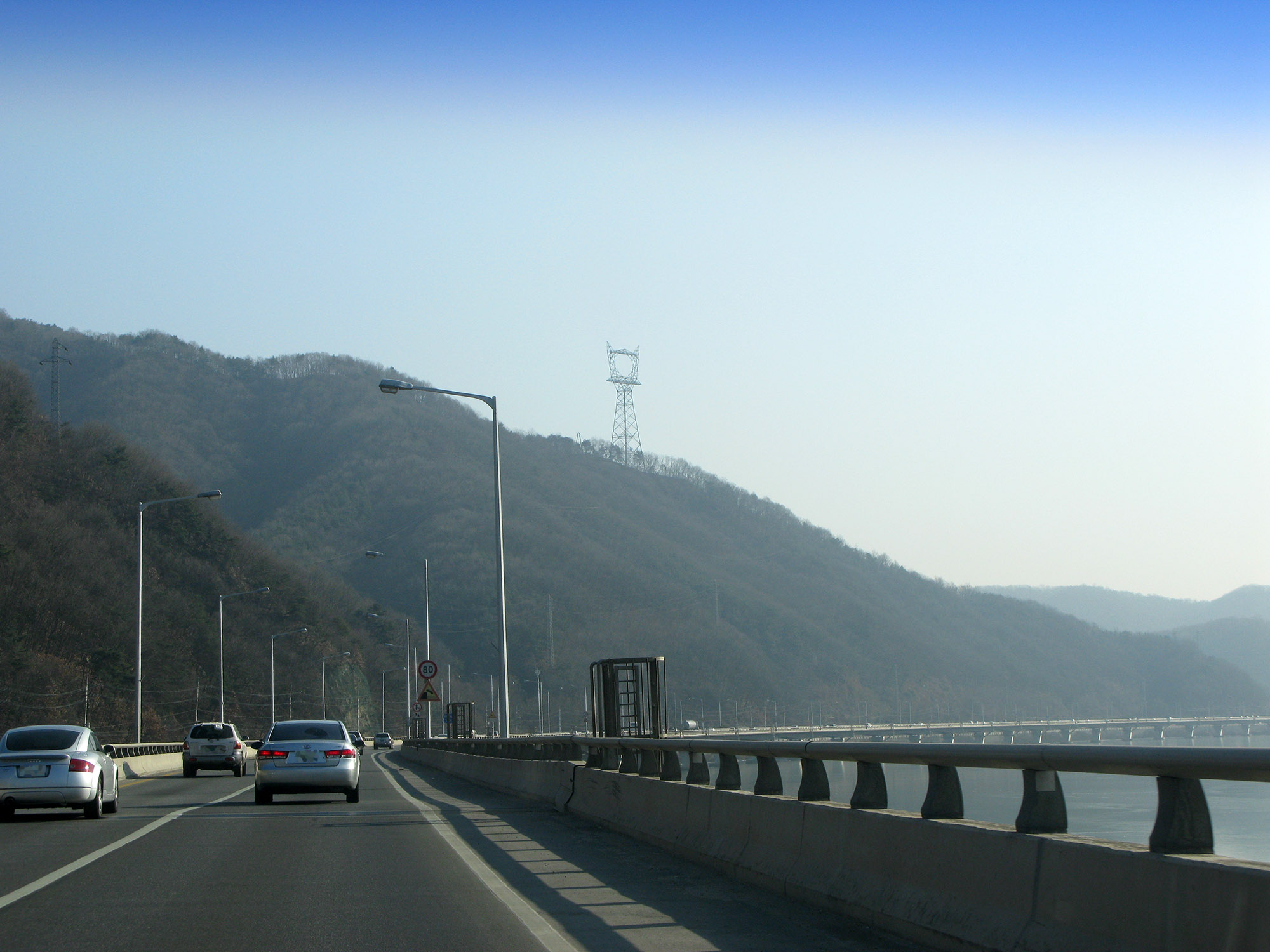
Route 6 at Yangseo, Yangpyeong, Gyeonggi Province

National Route 6 (Korean: 국도 제6호선; Gukdo Je Yuk(6) Hoseon)is a major highway on the Korea It connects Incheon with the city of Gangneung, Gangwon Province,

== History ==
- August 31, 1971: Designated as National Route 6 (Incheon–Gangneung Line) under the National Highway Designation Decree.
- December 20, 1972: Road section in Dogok-ri, Wabu-myeon, Yangju County, Gyeonggi Province changed from 450 m to 500 m due to route improvements.
- October 1, 1975: Opened a total of 280 m between Moyong-ri, Danwol-myeon, and Gahyeon-ri, Cheongun-myeon, Yangpyeong County, and closed 380 m of the existing section. Also opened a total of 360 m between Yuhyeon-ri, Seowon-myeon, and Chowon-ri, Gonggeun-myeon, Hoengseong County, and closed 620 m of the existing section.
- April 7, 1976: Upgraded a 10.087 km section from Hyeoncheon-ri, Dunnae-myeon, Hoengseong County, to Sangjinbu-ri, Jinbu-myeon, Pyeongchang County.
- March 14, 1981: Terminus changed from "Gyeonsojin, Gangneung City, Gangwon Province" to "Jumunjin-eup, Myeongju County, Gangwon Province." The route name was updated from "Incheon–Gangneung Line" to "Incheon–Jumunjin Line."
- April 13, 1981: Opened a 43 km section from Ganpyeong-ri, Jinbu-myeon, Pyeongchang County, to Seongnae-ri, Jumunjin-eup, Myeongju County, which had been elevated to national highway status. The existing 35 km section from Ganpyeong-ri, Jinbu-myeon, Pyeongchang County, to Seongnae-dong, Gangneung City, was closed.
- May 30, 1981: Road zone modified for an 8 km section following the revision of Presidential Decree No. 10247, the National Highway Designation Decree.
- January 25, 1982: Opened a 580 m section in Yanggeun-ri, Yangpyeong-eup, Yangpyeong County, and closed the previous 380 m bridge section.
- May 13, 1986: Starting point changed from "Incheon City, Gyeonggi Province" to "Jung-gu, Incheon Directly Governed City."
- July 15, 1994: Opened a 6.8 km section from Hageum-ri, Ucheon-myeon, Hoengseong County, to Chudong-ri, Hoengseong-eup.
- December 29, 1995: Opened a 2.8 km section from Sampae-dong, Namyangju City, to Paldang-ri, Wabu-eup, and closed the existing 3 km section from Sampae-dong to Dogok-ri, Wabu-eup.
- July 1, 1996: Starting point changed from "Jung-gu, Incheon Directly Governed City" to "Jung-gu, Incheon Metropolitan City," and terminus changed from "Jumunjin-eup, Myeongju County, Gangwon Province" to "Jumunjin-eup, Gangneung City, Gangwon Province." The name was restored to "Incheon–Gangneung Line."
- December 31, 1998: Opened expanded 3.925 km section of the road from Paldang Bridge to Joan (Paldang-ri, Wabu-eup, Namyangju City, to Neungnae-ri, Joan-myeon, Namyangju City) and closed 4.2 km of the old section. Opened expanded 4.186 km section of road from Joan to Yangsu (Neungnae-ri, Joan-myeon, Namyangju City, to Yongdam-ri, Yangseo-myeon, Yangpyeong County) and closed 5.49 km of the old section. Opened expanded 15.27 km section of road from Yangsu to Deokpyeong (Yongdam-ri, Yangseo-myeon, Yangpyeong County, to Obin-ri, Yangpyeong-eup) and closed 16.73 km of the old section.
- November 15, 1999: Opened expanded 4.1 km section of road from Deokpyeong-ri, Yangpyeong-eup, to Samseong-ri, Yongmun-myeon, Yangpyeong County, and closed the previous section.
- July 1, 2000: Opened expanded 2.26 km section of road from Biryong-ri to Yongdu-ri, Cheongun-myeon, Yangpyeong County, and closed 2.25 km of the existing section.
- December 31, 2000: Opened expanded 13.3 km section of road from Samseong-ri, Yongmun-myeon, to Biryong-ri, Cheongun-myeon, Yangpyeong County, and closed 14 km of the existing section.
- January 1, 2001: Opened expanded 6.7 km section from Masan-ri, Hoengseong-eup, Hoengseong County, to Sinchon-ri, Gonggeun-myeon, Hoengseong County, and closed 6.5 km of the existing section.
- November 17, 2003: Opened expanded 5.426 km section from Mui-ri to Pyeongchon-ri, Bongpyeong-myeon, Pyeongchang County.
- December 31, 2003: Opened expanded 5.737 km section from Masan-ri, Hoengseong-eup, to Yongdun-ri, Ucheon-myeon, Hoengseong County.
- December 24, 2010: Opened grade-separated 1.1 km section at Obin Interchange (Obin-ri, Yangpyeong-eup, Yangpyeong County).
- December 26, 2014: A 2.1 km section from Yanghwa Bridge to the south end of Yanghwa Bridge was removed from the motor vehicle-only road designation.
- June 23, 2017: Opened expanded 1.4 km section of Dunnae–Mui Road Section 1 (Maam-ri, Dunnae-myeon, Hoengseong County), closing 1.6 km of the old section.
- September 22, 2017: Opened expanded 10.8 km section of Dunnae–Mui Road Section 1 (Hyeoncheon-ri to Hwado-ri, Dunnae-myeon, Hoengseong County), closing the previous 1.6 km in Maam-ri.
- December 4, 2017: Opened expanded 8.64 km section of Seowon–Gonggeun Road (from Galun-ri, Cheongun-myeon, Yangpyeong County, to Chowon-ri, Gonggeun-myeon, Hoengseong County), closing the previous 1.35 km from Galun-ri to Yuhyeon-ri.
- December 27, 2017: Opened expanded 33.17 km section of Dunnae–Mui Road Section 2 (from Hwadong-ri, Dunnae-myeon, Hoengseong County, to Ganpyeong-ri, Jinbu-myeon, Pyeongchang County), closing 23.48 km from Hwadong-ri to Sangjinbu-ri. Closed 190 m section in Jangpyeong-ri, Yongpyeong-myeon, Pyeongchang County.

== Main stopovers ==
Incheon

- Jung District - Dong District - Nam District - Dong District - Seo District - Gyeyang District

Gyeonggi Province

- Bucheon

Seoul

- Gangseo District

Gyeonggi Province

- Bucheon

Seoul

- Gangseo District - Yangcheon District - Yeongdeungpo District - Yanghwa Bridge - Mapo District - Seodaemun District - Jongno District - Dongdaemun District - Jungnang District

Gyeonggi Province

- Guri - Namyangju - Yangpyeong County

Gangwon Province

- Hoengseong County - Pyeongchang County - Gangneung

== Major intersections ==
- (■): Motorway

IS: Intersection, IC: Interchange

=== Incheon ===
Name	Hangul name	Connection	Location		Note
Incheon station	인천역	National Route 42; National Route 46; National Route 77; Prefectural Route 84; Prefectural Route 98 (Jemullyang-ro); Wolmi-ro; China town-ro 51beon-gil	Incheon	Jung District	Terminus; National Route 77 overlap Prefectural Route 84, 98 overlap
Songwol Market	송월시장	Chamoejeon-ro	Incheon	Jung District	National Route 77 overlap Prefectural Route 84, 98 overlap
Manseok Overpass	만석고가교		Incheon	Jung District	National Route 77 overlap Prefectural Route 84, 98 overlap
Manseok Overpass			Incheon	Dong District	National Route 77 overlap Prefectural Route 84, 98 overlap
Dong-il Corp. Incheon Factory Incheon Manseok Elementary School	동일방직 인천공장 인천만석초등학교		Incheon	Dong District	National Route 77 overlap Prefectural Route 84, 98 overlap
Hwasu IS	화수사거리	Injung-ro; Jemullyang-ro	Incheon	Dong District	National Route 77 overlap Prefectural Route 84, 98 overlap
Songhyeon IS	송현사거리	Prefectural Route 84 (Jungbong-daero); Songhyeon-ro	Incheon	Dong District	National Route 77 overlap Prefectural Route 84, 98 overlap
Hwanggeumgogae IS	황금고개사거리	Saetgol-ro; Injung-ro	Incheon	Dong District	National Route 77 overlap Prefectural Route 98 overlap
Seoheung Elementary School	서흥초등학교		Incheon	Dong District	National Route 77 overlap Prefectural Route 98 overlap
Songrim IS	송림오거리	Dongsan-ro; Saetgol-ro; Songrim-ro	Incheon	Dong District	National Route 77 overlap Prefectural Route 98 overlap
No name	(이름 없음)	Saecheonnyeon-ro	Incheon	Dong District	National Route 77 overlap Prefectural Route 98 overlap
Songrim IS	송림삼거리	Bongsu-daero; Injung-ro	Incheon	Dong District	National Route 77 overlap Prefectural Route 98 overlap
Songrimgogae	송림고개		Incheon	Dong District	National Route 77 overlap Prefectural Route 98 overlap
Songrimgogae			Incheon	Nam District	National Route 77 overlap Prefectural Route 98 overlap
Incheondae IS	인천대삼거리	Sukgol-ro	Incheon	Nam District	National Route 77 overlap Prefectural Route 98 overlap
Incheon Seohwa Elementary School	인천서화초등학교		Incheon	Nam District	National Route 77 overlap Prefectural Route 98 overlap
Gunghyeon IS	궁현사거리	Yeomjeon-ro	Incheon	Nam District	National Route 77 overlap Prefectural Route 98 overlap
Incheongyo IS	인천교삼거리	Janggogae-ro	Incheon	Nam District	National Route 77 overlap Prefectural Route 98 overlap
Donggu Public Stadium	동구구민운동장		Incheon	Nam District	National Route 77 overlap Prefectural Route 98 overlap
Gajwa IS (Gajwa IC IS)	가좌 나들목 (가좌IC앞 교차로)	Gyeongin Expressway; Baekbeom-ro; Janggogae-ro	Incheon	Seo District	National Route 77 overlap Prefectural Route 98 overlap
Seoknamje 2 Overpass	석남제2고가교		Incheon	Seo District	National Route 77 overlap Prefectural Route 98 overlap Pass through
Seoknamje 1 Overpass	석남제1고가교	Gilju-ro	Incheon	Seo District	National Route 77 overlap Prefectural Route 98 overlap Pass through
Yuldo Entrance IS	율도입구삼거리	Yuldo-ro	Incheon	Seo District	National Route 77 overlap Prefectural Route 98 overlap
Ruwon IS	루원 교차로	Prefectural Route 98 (Seogot-ro); Bongo-daero	Incheon	Seo District	National Route 77 overlap Prefectural Route 98 overlap
(North of Hyoseong Overpass)	(효성고가교 북단)	Bongo-daero; Cheongan-ro; Hyoseo-ro	Incheon	Gyeyang District	National Route 77 overlap Continuation into Gyeonggi Province
Saemal IS	새말사거리	Majang-ro	Incheon	Gyeyang District	National Route 77 overlap Continuation into Gyeonggi Province
Hyoseong IS	효성사거리	Annam-ro	Incheon	Gyeyang District	National Route 77 overlap Continuation into Gyeonggi Province
Nadeulmok IS (Bupyeong IC)	나들목사거리 (부평 나들목)	Gyeongin Expressway; Gyeyang-daero	Incheon	Gyeyang District	National Route 77 overlap Continuation into Gyeonggi Province
Jakjeon Overpass IS	작전고가앞 교차로	Jubuto-ro	Incheon	Gyeyang District	National Route 77 overlap Continuation into Gyeonggi Province
Meddeul IS	메뜰사거리	Jangje-ro	Incheon	Gyeyang District	National Route 77 overlap Continuation into Gyeonggi Province
Seowoon Middle School Seowoon High School	서운중학교 서운고등학교		Incheon	Gyeyang District	National Route 77 overlap Continuation into Gyeonggi Province
Cheonsang Bridge	천상교		Incheon	Gyeyang District	National Route 77 overlap Continuation into Gyeonggi Province

=== Gyeonggi Province Bucheon ===
Name	Hangul name	Connection	Location		Note
Cheonsang Bridge	천상교		Bucheon City	Ojeong-dong	National Route 77 overlap Incheon - Bucheon border line
Automobile Inspection Station IS	자동차검사소삼거리	Ojeong-ro 39beon-gil	Bucheon City	Ojeong-dong	National Route 77 overlap Incheon - Bucheon border line
No name	(이름 없음)	National Route 39 (Seokcheon-ro)	Bucheon City	Ojeong-dong	National Route 39, National Route 77 overlap
Saneopgil IS (Bucheon IC)	산업길사거리 (부천 나들목)	National Route 39 (Sinheung-ro)	Bucheon City	Ojeong-dong	National Route 39, National Route 77 overlap
Naechon Overpass Entrance	내촌고가입구	Bucheon-ro	Bucheon City	Ojeong-dong	National Route 77 overlap Continuation into Seoul
Upyeon Mail Center IS	우편집중국삼거리	Ojeong-ro 211beon-gil	Bucheon City	Ojeong-dong	National Route 77 overlap Continuation into Seoul
OBS Gyeongin TV	OBS 경인TV		Bucheon City	Ojeong-dong	National Route 77 overlap Continuation into Seoul
Duksan High School	덕산고등학교	Ojeong-ro 251beon-gil Ojeong-ro 252beon-gil	Bucheon City	Ojeong-dong	National Route 77 overlap Continuation into Seoul
Bongo-daero IS	봉오대로사거리	Bongo-daero	Bucheon City	Ojeong-dong	National Route 77 overlap Continuation into Seoul
Daejangdong Entrance IS	대장동입구 교차로	Daejang-ro	Bucheon City	Gogang-dong	National Route 77 overlap Continuation into Seoul
Asiana Airlines Entrance	아시아나항공입구		Bucheon City	Gogang-dong	National Route 77 overlap Continuation into Seoul
Osoe IS	오쇠삼거리	Sosa-ro; Sosa-ro 970beon-gil	Bucheon City	Gogang-dong	National Route 77 overlap Continuation into Seoul

=== Seoul ===
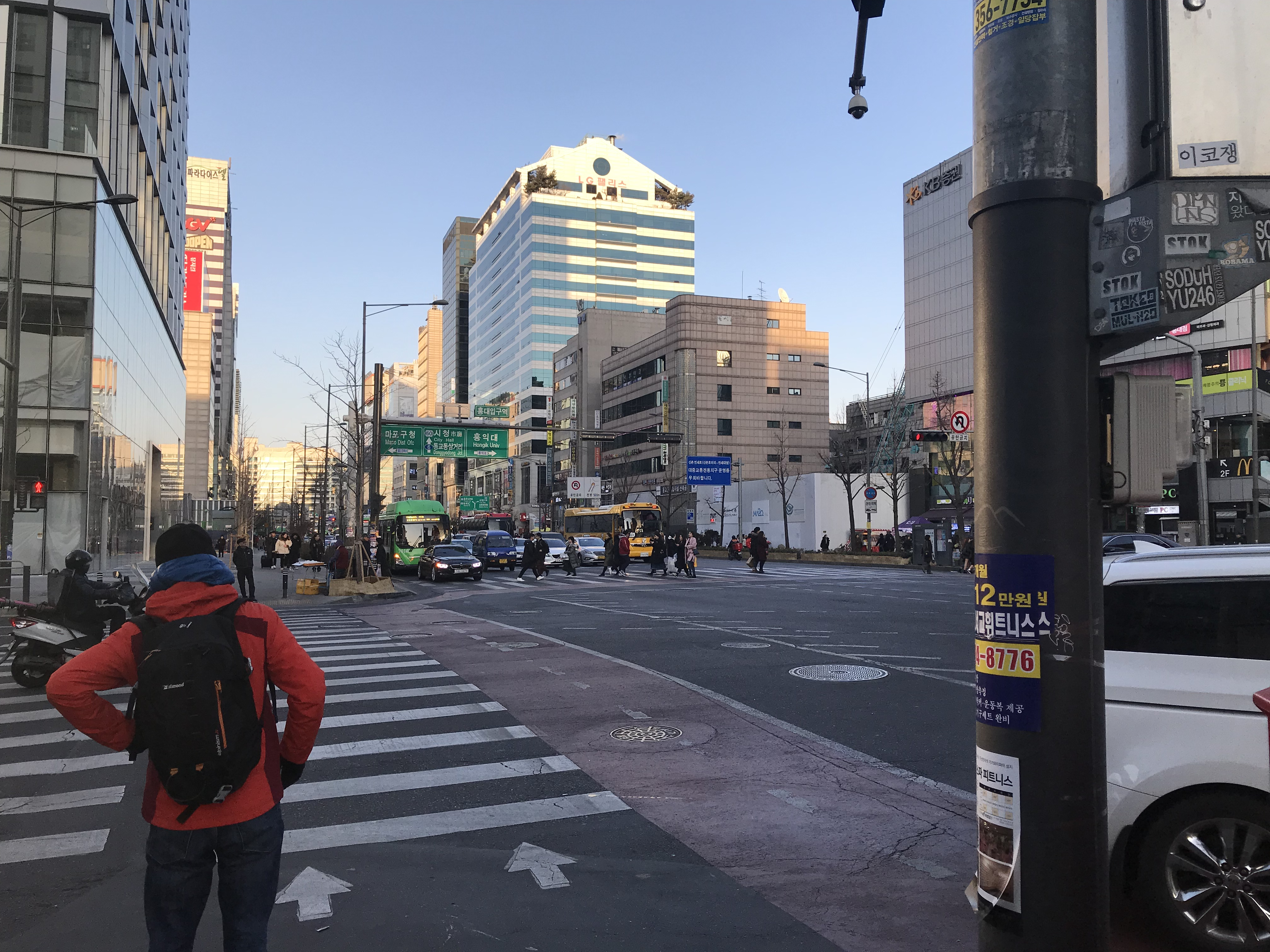
Hongik University Sta. in Mapo District

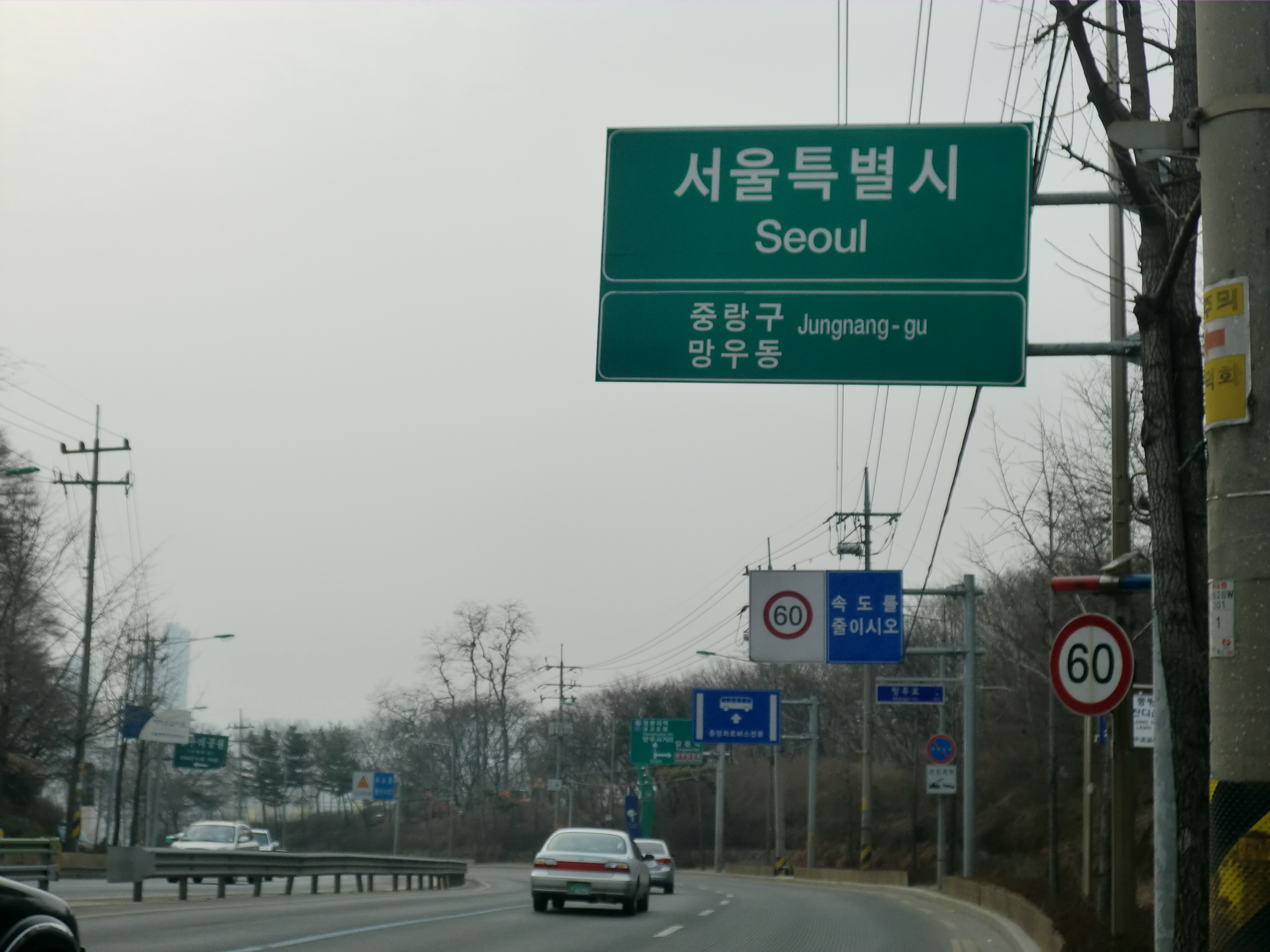
National Route 6 in Jungnang District, Seoul

Name	Hangul name	Connection	Location		Note
Osoe IS	오쇠삼거리	Sosa-ro; Sosa-ro 970beon-gil	Seoul	Gangseo District	National Route 77 overlap Gyeonggi Province - Seoul border line
Oebalsan IS	외발산사거리	Nambu Beltway; Banghwa-daero	Seoul	Gangseo District	National Route 77 overlap Gyeonggi Province - Seoul border line
Magok station IS	마곡역 교차로	National Route 48 (Gonghang-daero)	Seoul	Gangseo District	National Route 48, National Route 77 overlap
Balsan station IS	발산역 교차로	Gangseo-ro	Seoul	Gangseo District	National Route 48, National Route 77 overlap
Korea Gas Corporation KBS SPORTS WORLD	한국가스공사; KBS스포츠월드		Seoul	Gangseo District	National Route 48, National Route 77 overlap
Gangseo District Office IS	강서구청사거리	Hwagok-ro	Seoul	Gangseo District	National Route 48, National Route 77 overlap
Deungchon Middle School Seoul Baekseok Elementary School National Information Society Agency	등촌중학교 서울백석초등학교 한국정보화진흥원		Seoul	Gangseo District	National Route 48, National Route 77 overlap
Deungchon station IS	등촌역 교차로	Deungchon-ro; Gonghang-daero 59-gil	Seoul	Yangcheon District	National Route 48, National Route 77 overlap
Yeomchang station	염창역		Seoul	Yangcheon District	National Route 48, National Route 77 overlap
Yanghwa Bridge	양화교	Anyangcheon-ro; Yangcheon-ro	Seoul	Yangcheon District	National Route 48, National Route 77 overlap
Yanghwa Bridge			Seoul	Yeongdeungpo District	National Route 48, National Route 77 overlap
South of Seongsan Bridge IS	성산대교남단 교차로	National Route 1 National Route 48 (Seobu Expressway)	Seoul	Yeongdeungpo District	National Route 48, National Route 77 overlap
South of Yanghwa Bridge IS	양화대교남단 교차로	Nodeul-ro; Seonyu-ro	Seoul	Yeongdeungpo District	National Route 77 overlap
Yanghwa Bridge	양화대교		Seoul	Yeongdeungpo District	National Route 77 overlap
Yanghwa Bridge			Seoul	Mapo District	National Route 77 overlap
North of Yanghwa Bridge IS	양화대교북단 교차로	National Route 77; Prefectural Route 23 (Gangbyeon Expressway)	Seoul	Mapo District	National Route 77 overlap
Hapjeong station IS	합정역교차로	Dongmak-ro; World Cup-ro	Seoul	Mapo District	
Hongik University station Donggyo-dong IS	홍대입구역 동교동삼거리	Yeonhui-ro	Seoul	Mapo District	
Changcheon-dong IS	창천동삼거리	Wausan-ro	Seoul	Mapo District	
Sinchon Rotary Sinchon station	신촌로터리 지하 신촌역	Baekbeom-ro; Seogang-ro; Yonsei-ro	Seoul	Mapo District	
Sinchon station Entrance	신촌기차역입구	Sinchonyeok-ro	Seoul	Mapo District	
Ewha Womans University station IS	이대역교차로	Daeheung-ro; Ewhayeodae-gil	Seoul	Mapo District	
Ahyeon station IS	아현역교차로	Gullebang-ro; Bugahyeon-ro	Seoul	Seodaemun District	
Ahyeon IS	아현교차로	Mapo-daero	Seoul	Seodaemun District	
Chungjeongno IS (Chungjeongno station) (Ahyeon Overpass)	충정로사거리 (충정로역) (아현고가차도)	Seosomun-ro; Kyonggidae-ro	Seoul	Seodaemun District	
Seodaemun station IS (Seodaemun Station Overpass)	서대문역교차로 (서대문역고가차도)	Tongil-ro	Seoul	Seodaemun District	
Jeongdong IS	정동사거리	Songwol-gil; Jeongdong-gil	Seoul	Seodaemun District	
Gyeonghuigung	경희궁		Seoul	Jongno District	
Sejong-daero IS	세종대로사거리	National Route 48 (Sejong-daero)	Seoul	Jongno District	
Jongno 1-ga IS (Jonggak station)	종로1가교차로 (종각역)	Ujeongguk-ro	Seoul	Jongno District	
Jongno 2-ga IS	종로2가교차로	Samil-daero	Seoul	Jongno District	
Jongno 3-ga station	종로3가역	Donhwamun-ro	Seoul	Jongno District	
Jongno 4-ga IS	종로4가교차로	Changgyeonggung-ro	Seoul	Jongno District	
Jongno 5-ga IS (Jongno 5-ga station)	종로5가교차로 (종로5가역)	Daehak-ro; Dongho-ro	Seoul	Jongno District	
Heunginjimun IS (Dongdaemun station)	흥인지문교차로 (동대문역)	Yulgok-ro	Seoul	Jongno District	
Dongmyo station	동묘앞역	Jibong-ro	Seoul	Jongno District	
Sinseol-dong station IS	신설동역교차로	Nangye-ro; Bomun-ro; Cheonho-daero	Seoul	Dongdaemun District	
Yongdu-dong IS	용두동사거리	Muhak-ro	Seoul	Dongdaemun District	
Jegi-dong station	제기동역		Seoul	Dongdaemun District	
Kyungdong Market IS	경동시장사거리	Gosanja-ro	Seoul	Dongdaemun District	
Catholic Univ. of Korea St. Paul's Hospital IS	성바오로병원교차로	Dapsimni-ro	Seoul	Dongdaemun District	
Cheongnyangni station IS	청량리역교차로	Hongneung-ro	Seoul	Dongdaemun District	
Ddeokjeon Bridge IS	떡전교사거리	Jegi-ro; Jeonnong-ro	Seoul	Dongdaemun District	
Sijosa IS	시조사삼거리	Imun-ro	Seoul	Dongdaemun District	
Hoegi station	회기역		Seoul	Dongdaemun District	
Sahmyook Medical Center	삼육서울병원		Seoul	Dongdaemun District	
Jungnang Bridge	중랑교	Dongbu Expressway	Seoul	Dongdaemun District	
Dongbu Market IS (Jungnang station)	동부시장교차로 (중랑역)	Jungnangyeok-ro	Seoul	Jungnang District	
Dong1ro Underpass IS	동1로지하차도교차로	National Route 3 (Dongil-ro)	Seoul	Jungnang District	National Route 47 overlap
Sangbong IS (Sangbong station)	상봉삼거리 (상봉역)	Myeonmok-ro	Seoul	Jungnang District	National Route 47 overlap
Sangbong Underpass IS	상봉지하차도교차로	Sangbongjungang-ro	Seoul	Jungnang District	National Route 47 overlap
Mangu station IS	망우역교차로	Sangbong-ro	Seoul	Jungnang District	National Route 47 overlap
Sinnae Underpass IS	신내지하차도교차로	Sinnae-ro	Seoul	Jungnang District	National Route 47 overlap
Mangu IS	망우사거리	National Route 47 (Yongmasan-ro)	Seoul	Jungnang District	
Mangurigogae	망우리고개		Seoul	Jungnang District	Continuation into Gyeonggi Province

=== Gyeonggi Province ===
Name	Hangul name	Connection	Location		Note
Mangurigogae	망우리고개		Guri City	Gyomun-dong	Seoul - Gyeonggi Province border line
Gyomun IS	교문사거리	National Route 43; National Route 46 (Achasan-ro)	Guri City	Gyomun-dong	
Central Wedding Hall IS	중앙예식장앞교차로	Eungdalmal-ro; Cheyukgwan-ro	Guri City	Inchang-dong	
Dolda-ri IS	돌다리사거리	Geonwon-daero; Geombae-ro	Guri City	Inchang-dong	
Guri station Guri Intercity Bus Stop	구리역 구리시외버스정류장		Guri City	Inchang-dong	
Wangsuk Bridge	왕숙교		Guri City	Inchang-dong	
South Yangju IC (Donong IS)	남양주 나들목 (도농사거리)	Seoul Ring Expressway; Migeum-ro	Namyangju City	Dasan-dong	
No name	(이름 없음)	Donong-ro	Namyangju City	Dasan-dong	
Donong station	도농역		Namyangju City	Dasan-dong	
Donong IS	도농삼거리	Gyeongchun-ro	Namyangju City	Dasan-dong	
No name	(이름 없음)	Bukbu Expressway	Namyangju City	Yangjeong-dong	
Ipaebangatganap	이패방앗간앞	Prefectural Route 86 (Yangjeong-ro)	Namyangju City	Yangjeong-dong	Prefectural Route 86 overlap
Ipae IC	이패 나들목	Suseok-Hopyeong Urban Expressway	Namyangju City	Yangjeong-dong	Prefectural Route 86 overlap
Yangjeong station	양정역		Namyangju City	Yangjeong-dong	Prefectural Route 86 overlap
Sampae IS	삼패사거리	Gosan-ro	Namyangju City	Yangjeong-dong	Prefectural Route 86 overlap Deokso-Sampae IC (Seoul-Yangyang Expressway) indirectly connected
Deokso IC	덕소 나들목	Prefectural Route 86 (Deokso-ro)	Namyangju City	Yangjeong-dong	Prefectural Route 86 overlap
Deoksogangbyeon Bridge	덕소강변대교		Namyangju City	Wabu-eup	
Dogok IC	도곡 나들목	Deokso-ro	Namyangju City	Wabu-eup	
Hapaldang IS	하팔당삼거리	Paldang-ro	Namyangju City	Wabu-eup	
Paldang Bridge IC	팔당대교 나들목	Paldang Bridge; National Route 45 (Changu-ro)	Namyangju City	Wabu-eup	National Route 45 overlap
Paldang 1 Tunnel	팔당1터널		Namyangju City	Wabu-eup	National Route 45 overlap Right tunnel: Approximately 220m Left tunnel: Approximately 260m
Paldang 2 Tunnel	팔당2터널		Namyangju City	Joan-myeon	National Route 45 overlap Approximately 310m
Paldang 3 Tunnel	팔당3터널		Namyangju City	Joan-myeon	National Route 45 overlap Right tunnel: Approximately 175m Left tunnel: Approximately 235m
Paldang 4 Tunnel	팔당4터널		Namyangju City	Joan-myeon	National Route 45 overlap Right tunnel: Approximately 420m Left tunnel: Approximately 450m
Bongan Tunnel	봉안터널		Namyangju City	Joan-myeon	National Route 45 overlap Approximately 750m
Bongan Bridge	봉안대교		Namyangju City	Joan-myeon	National Route 45 overlap
Joan IC	조안 나들목	National Route 45 (Bukhangang-ro)	Namyangju City	Joan-myeon	National Route 45 overlap
Sinyangsu Bridge	신양수대교		Yangpyeong County	Yangseo-myeon	
Yangsu IS	양수 교차로	Yangsu-ro	Yangpyeong County	Yangseo-myeon	
Yongdam Bridge	용담대교		Yangpyeong County	Yangseo-myeon	
Sinwol station	신원역		Yangpyeong County	Yangseo-myeon	
Guksu IS (Guksu station)	(국수교차로) (국수역)		Yangpyeong County	Yangseo-myeon	
Yangpyeong IC	양평 나들목	Jungbu Naeryuk Expressway; Capital Region 2nd Ring Expressway	Yangpyeong County	Okcheon-myeon	
Asin station IS	아신역교차로		Yangpyeong County	Okcheon-myeon	
Goeup IS	고읍교차로	Goeup-ro	Yangpyeong County	Okcheon-myeon	
Okcheon IS	옥천교차로		Yangpyeong County	Okcheon-myeon	
Obin IS	오빈교차로	Yanggeun-ro	Yangpyeong County	Yangpyeong-eup	
Sangpyeong IS	상평 교차로	National Route 37; Prefectural Route 98 (Mayusan-ro)	Yangpyeong County	Yangpyeong-eup	National Route 37, National Route 44 overlap
Yangpyeong IS	양평 교차로	National Route 37 (Yeoju-Yangpyeong Motorway)	Yangpyeong County	Yangpyeong-eup	National Route 37, National Route 44 overlap
Yangpyeong Fire Station	양평소방서		Yangpyeong County	Yangpyeong-eup	National Route 44 overlap
Gongheung Overpass	공흥육교	Baegun-gil	Yangpyeong County	Yangpyeong-eup	National Route 44 overlap
Baekdong Overpass	백동육교	Chorong-gil	Yangpyeong County	Yangpyeong-eup	National Route 44 overlap
Baekan Overpass	백안육교	Jungang-ro	Yangpyeong County	Yangpyeong-eup	National Route 44 overlap
Sinheung Overpass	신흥육교	Daeheung-ro	Yangpyeong County	Yangpyeong-eup	National Route 44 overlap
Yongmun Tunnel	용문터널		Yangpyeong County	Yongmun-myeon	National Route 44 overlap Right tunnel: Approximately 345m Left tunnel: Approximately 173m
Yongmun IS	용문 교차로	Garwol-gil	Yangpyeong County	Yongmun-myeon	National Route 44 overlap
Yongmun Bridge	용문교		Yangpyeong County	Yongmun-myeon	National Route 44 overlap
Maryong IS	마룡 교차로	Prefectural Route 341 (Yongmunsan-ro)	Yangpyeong County	Yongmun-myeon	National Route 44 overlap
Geumgok IS	금곡 교차로	Yongmun-ro	Yangpyeong County	Yongmun-myeon	National Route 44 overlap
Bongsang IS	봉상삼거리	Prefectural Route 70 (Yongmun-ro)	Yangpyeong County	Danwol-myeon	National Route 44 overlap Prefectural Route 70 overlap
Samga IS	삼가 교차로	Prefectural Route 345 (Yangdong-ro); Bongsang-gil	Yangpyeong County	Danwol-myeon	National Route 44 overlap Prefectural Route 70, 345 overlap
Danwol IS	단월 교차로	Boryong-gil	Yangpyeong County	Danwol-myeon	National Route 44 overlap Prefectural Route 70, 345 overlap
Boryong IS	보룡 교차로	Prefectural Route 70; Prefectural Route 345 (Danwol-ro)	Yangpyeong County	Danwol-myeon	National Route 44 overlap Prefectural Route 70, 345 overlap
Gyodong IS	교동 교차로	Baekdong-gil	Yangpyeong County	Cheongun-myeon	National Route 44 overlap
Biryong IS	비룡 교차로	Biryong 1-gil	Yangpyeong County	Cheongun-myeon	National Route 44 overlap
Yongdu IS	용두 교차로	National Route 44 (Seorak-ro)	Yangpyeong County	Cheongun-myeon	National Route 44 overlap
No name	(이름 없음)	Prefectural Route 349 (Morungogaet-gil)	Yangpyeong County	Cheongun-myeon	
Dodeokgogae	도덕고개		Yangpyeong County	Cheongun-myeon	Continuation into Gangwon Province

=== Gangwon Province ===
Name	Hangul name	Connection	Location		Note
Dodeokgogae	도덕고개		Hoengseong County	Seowon-myeon	Gyeonggi Province - Gangwon Province border line
Seokhwa IS	석화삼거리	Prefectural Route 409 (Seowonseo-ro)	Hoengseong County	Seowon-myeon	
Yuhyeon Elementary School	유현초등학교		Hoengseong County	Seowon-myeon	
Hoengseong Gonggeun Agricultural Complex	횡성공근농공단지		Hoengseong County	Gonggeun-myeon	
Sinchon IC	신촌 나들목	National Route 5 (Yeongseo-ro)	Hoengseong County	Gonggeun-myeon	National Route 5 overlap
Hoengseong IC (Hakgok IC)	횡성 나들목 (학곡 나들목)	Jungang Expressway; Hanu-ro	Hoengseong County	Hoengseong-eup	National Route 5 overlap
Hoengseong Tunnel	횡성터널		Hoengseong County	Hoengseong-eup	National Route 5 overlap Right tunnel: Approximately 540m Left tunnel: Approximately 544m
Ipseok IC	입석 나들목	National Route 5 National Route 19 (Hoengseong-ro)	Hoengseong County	Hoengseong-eup	National Route 5, National Route 19 overlap
Eupsang IS	읍상교차로	Hanu-ro	Hoengseong County	Hoengseong-eup	National Route 19 overlap
Masan IS	마산교차로	Hanu-ro	Hoengseong County	Hoengseong-eup	National Route 19 overlap
Chudong IS	추동교차로	Prefectural Route 442 (Hanu-ro)	Hoengseong County	Hoengseong-eup	National Route 19 overlap
Yeongyeongpo IS	영영포교차로	National Route 19 (Seongdong-ro)	Hoengseong County	Hoengseong-eup	National Route 19 overlap
No name	(이름 없음)	Chuyong-ro	Hoengseong County	Ucheon-myeon	
No name	(이름 없음)	Sanghaga-ro	Hoengseong County	Ucheon-myeon	
No name	(이름 없음)	Jeongpo-ro	Hoengseong County	Ucheon-myeon	
No name	(이름 없음)	Deoksong-ro	Hoengseong County	Dunnae-myeon	
Hyeoncheon IS	현천삼거리	Prefectural Route 411 (Gangbyeon-ro)	Hoengseong County	Dunnae-myeon	
Dunnae IC	둔내 나들목	Yeongdong Expressway	Hoengseong County	Dunnae-myeon	
No name	(이름 없음)	Prefectural Route 420 (Gowon-ro)	Hoengseong County	Dunnae-myeon	Prefectural Route 420 overlap
Dunnae IS	둔내삼거리	Dunbang-ro; Gyeonggang-ro dunbang 6-gil	Hoengseong County	Dunnae-myeon	Prefectural Route 420 overlap
No name	(이름 없음)	Yonghyeon-ro	Hoengseong County	Dunnae-myeon	Prefectural Route 420 overlap
Maam 1-ri	마암1리	Prefectural Route 420 (Gapcheon-ro)	Hoengseong County	Dunnae-myeon	Prefectural Route 420 overlap
No name	(이름 없음)	Bongdeok-ro	Hoengseong County	Dunnae-myeon	
Yanggudumijae	양구두미재		Pyeongchang County	Bongpyeong-myeon	
Taegi IS	태기삼거리	Prefectural Route 408 (Taegi-ro)	Pyeongchang County	Bongpyeong-myeon	Prefectural Route 408 overlap
No name	(이름 없음)	Prefectural Route 408 (Palsong-ro)	Pyeongchang County	Bongpyeong-myeon	Prefectural Route 408 overlap
No name	(이름 없음)	Bongpyeongbuk-ro	Pyeongchang County	Bongpyeong-myeon	
No name	(이름 없음)	Ihyoseok-gil	Pyeongchang County	Bongpyeong-myeon	
No name	(이름 없음)	Prefectural Route 424 (Aegangnamu-gil)	Pyeongchang County	Bongpyeong-myeon	Prefectural Route 424 overlap
Baekok IS	백옥삼거리	Prefectural Route 408; Prefectural Route 424 (Taegi-ro)	Pyeongchang County	Yongpyeong-myeon	Prefectural Route 424 overlap
Pyeongchang IC	평창 나들목	Yeongdong Expressway	Pyeongchang County	Yongpyeong-myeon	
No name	(이름 없음)	National Route 31 (Pyeongchang-daero)	Pyeongchang County	Yongpyeong-myeon	National Route 31 overlap
Changpyeong Intercity Bus Terminal	장평시외버스터미널		Pyeongchang County	Yongpyeong-myeon	National Route 31 overlap
Yongpyeong-myeon Office	용평면사무소		Pyeongchang County	Yongpyeong-myeon	National Route 31 overlap
Soksa IC	속사 나들목	Yeongdong Expressway	Pyeongchang County	Yongpyeong-myeon	National Route 31 overlap
Soksa IS	속사삼거리	National Route 31 (Unduryeong-ro)	Pyeongchang County	Yongpyeong-myeon	National Route 31 overlap
Soksajae	속사재		Pyeongchang County	Jinbu-myeon	
No name	(이름 없음)	Cheongsong-ro	Pyeongchang County	Jinbu-myeon	
Hajinbu IS	하진부교차로	National Route 59 (Odaecheon-ro); Jinbujungang-ro	Pyeongchang County	Jinbu-myeon	National Route 59 overlap
Jinbu Sports Park IS	진부체육공원교차로	Seokdu-ro	Pyeongchang County	Jinbu-myeon	National Route 59 overlap
Odae Bridge IS (Jinbu IC)	오대교사거리 (진부 나들목)	Yeongdong Expressway	Pyeongchang County	Jinbu-myeon	National Route 59 overlap
No name	(이름 없음)	Jinbujungang-ro	Pyeongchang County	Jinbu-myeon	National Route 59 overlap
No name	(이름 없음)	Bangadari-ro	Pyeongchang County	Jinbu-myeon	National Route 59 overlap
Woljeong IS	월정삼거리	Prefectural Route 456 (Gyeonggang-ro)	Pyeongchang County	Jinbu-myeon	National Route 59 overlap
Byeongan IS	병안삼거리	Odaesan-ro	Pyeongchang County	Daegwalnyeong-myeon	National Route 59 overlap
Jingogae	진고개		Gangneung City	Yeongok-myeon	National Route 59 overlap
Buyeon-dong IS	부연동삼거리	National Route 59 (Buyeondong-gil)	Gangneung City	Yeongok-myeon	National Route 59 overlap
Sogeumgang River Entrance IS	소금강입구교차로	Sogeumgang-gil	Gangneung City	Yeongok-myeon	
Sinwang Elementary School	신왕초등학교	Jangdeokgogae-gil	Gangneung City	Yeongok-myeon	
(North of Haengsin Bridge)	(행신교 북단)	Prefectural Route 415 (Sinwang-gil)	Gangneung City	Yeongok-myeon	
Yeongok IS	연곡삼거리	Yeonju-ro	Gangneung City	Yeongok-myeon	
Yeongok IS	연곡교차로	National Route 7 (Donghae-daero)	Gangneung City	Yeongok-myeon	Terminus
