= Yeondaeam =

Buddhist temple

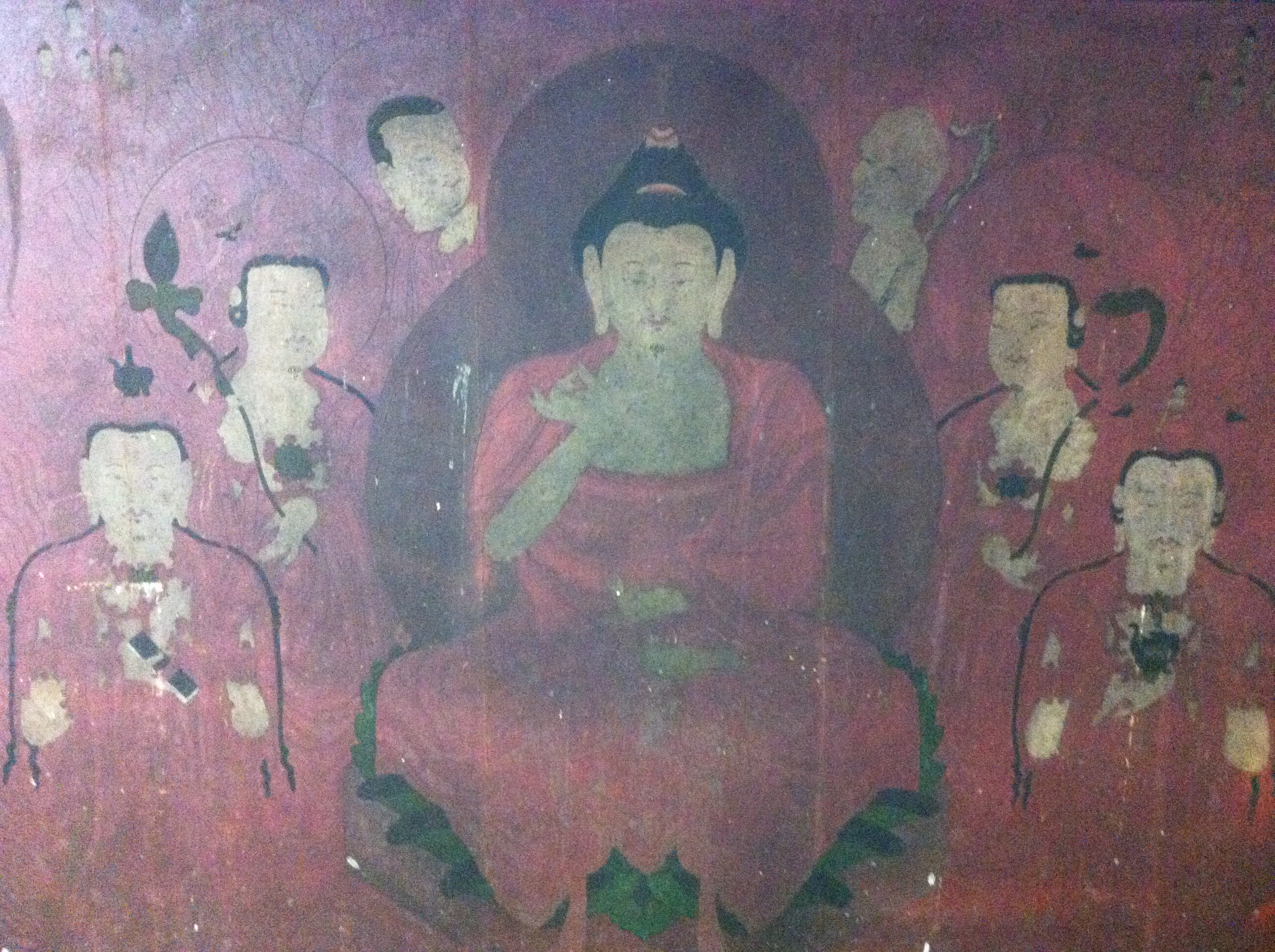
- Yeondaeam Amitabha Buddha

- Location within South Korea

Religion
- Affiliation: Buddhism

Location
- Location: Samji-ri, Yeongyang-eup, Yeongyang County, Gyeongsangbuk-do
- Country: South Korea
- Coordinates: 36.674°N 129.1377°E

Architecture
- Elevation: 264 m (866 ft)

Korean name
- Hangul: 연대암
- Hanja: 蓮臺庵
- RR: Yeondaeam
- MR: Yŏndaeam

Yeondaeam is a temple located in Yeongyang County, Gyeongsangbuk-do, South Korea.
