= Yeongyang County =

Coordinates: 36°40′0″N 129°06′44″E

Yeongyang
- County
- Panoramic view of Yeongyang-eup

- Flag Emblem of Yeongyang

- Location in South Korea
- Country: South Korea
- Region: Yeongnam
- Administrative divisions: 1 eup, 5 myeon

Area
  - Total: 815.14 km^{2} (314.73 sq mi)

Population (September 2024)
  - Total: 15,403
  - Density: 21.8/km^{2} (56/sq mi)
  - Dialect: Gyeongsang

Korean name
- Hangul: 영양군
- Hanja: 英陽郡
- RR: Yeongyang-gun
- MR: Yŏngyang-gun

Yeongyang County (Korean: 영양군) is an inland county in the north-eastern area of North Gyeongsang Province, South Korea.

== Geography ==
An isolated area difficult to access, Yeongyang is sometimes called an "inland island". The county has the lowest population of all counties in North Gyeongsang Province (without Ulleung County), being mountainous with deep ravines, and only 10 percent of land is cultivable.

== Local specialties ==
The county is famous for its apples and chili peppers, and is home to the Yeongyang Chili Pepper Experimental Station. Since 1984, the county has elected a "Miss Chili Pepper" to represent Yeongyang chili peppers.

== Culture ==
The area is known as a centre of literature, with the tradition of scholars reading and reciting poetry deep in the mountains, from which have emerged Oh Il-do, Cho Chi-hun and Yi Munyol. Within the county, the Yeondaeam historic temple is located in the village of Samji-Ri.

== Administrative divisions ==
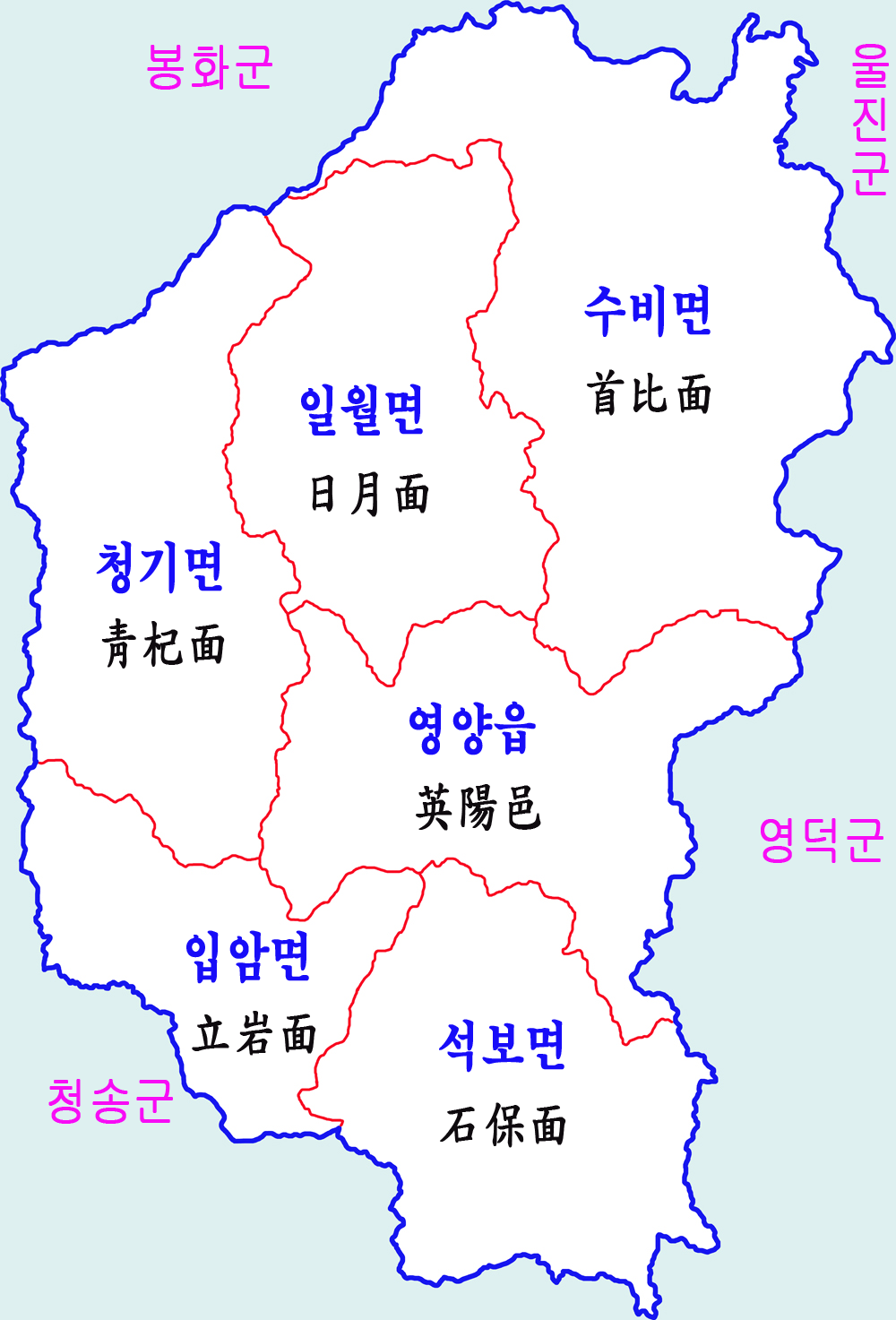
Map of Yeongyang County in Korean

Yeongyang County is divided into 1 eup and 5 myeon.

Name	Hangeul	Hanja
Yeongyang-eup	영양읍	英陽邑
Ibam-myeon	입암면	立岩面
Cheonggi-myeon	청기면	靑杞面
Irwol-myeon	일월면	日月面
Subi-myeon	수비면	首比面
Seokbo-myeon	석보면	石保面

== Twin towns – sister cities ==
Yeongyang is twinned with:

- Gangdong-gu, South Korea
- Eunpyeong-gu, South Korea
