= National Route 5 (South Korea) =

Road in South Korea

National Route 5
- 국도 제5호선

Route information
- Length: 1,295 km (805 mi)
- Existed: 31 August 1971–present

Major junctions
- South end: Changseon-myeon, Namhae
- North end: Junggang, Jaseong (official); North Korean border in Cheorwon (unofficial)

Location
- Country: South Korea

Highway system
- Highway systems of South Korea; Expressways; National; Local
← National Route 4	→ National Route 6

National Route 5 is a national highway in South Korea. It officially runs from Tongyeong to Jaseong in North Korea, but because of the division of Korea it ends in practice in Cheorwon County. It was established on 31 August 1971.

== Overview ==
The section between Daegu and Andong, known as the Gu-an National Road, is a four-lane road and a main transport route in North Gyeongsang Province. The section from Andong to Yeongju has also been widened.

The route runs parallel to the Jungang Expressway and to the former Guma Expressway, which is now part of the Jungbu Naeryuk Expressway. It is heavily used between Danyang and Jecheon in North Chungcheong Province, and between Wonju, Hoengseong, Hongcheon and Chuncheon in Gangwon Province. Most intercity buses from Wonju to Hongcheon use National Route 5. The section from Daegu to Changnyeong and Changwon in South Gyeongsang Province is also a four-lane road.

A section between Geoje and Changwon, including the Yi Sun-sin Bridge, is planned. The route formerly began in front of Masan City Hall; its starting point was later moved to Geoje, and the Changwon section was rerouted to run from the Yi Sun-sin Bridge via the Hyeondong Intersection and Ssaljae Tunnel to Jung-ri in Naeseo-eup.

On 22 June 2021, the starting point was extended again, to Donam-dong in Tongyeong.

== Main stopovers ==
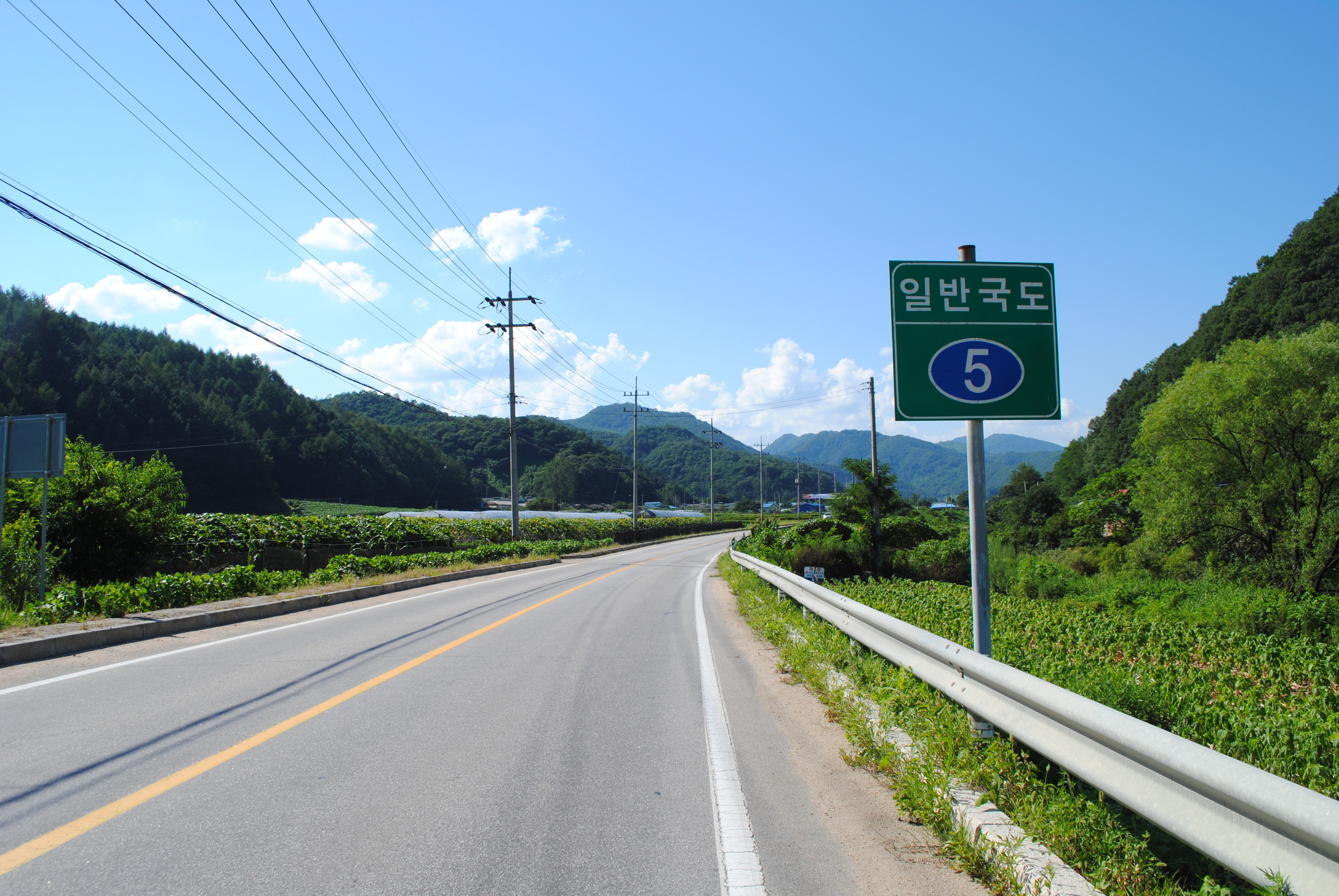
National Route 5 in Hwacheon

=== South Korea section ===
South Gyeongsang Province

- Geoje - Changwon - Haman County - Changnyeong County

Daegu

- Dalseong County - Dalseo District - Nam District - Dalseo District - Seo District - Buk District

North Gyeongsang Province

- Chilgok County - Gunwi County - Uiseong County - Andong - Yeongju

North Chungcheong Province

- Danyang County - Jecheon

Gangwon Province

- Wonju - Hoengseong County - Hongcheon County - Chuncheon - Hwacheon County - Cheorwon County

=== North Korea section ===
Kangwon Province

- Pyonggang County

South Hamgyong Province

- Anbyon County - Wonsan - Munchon - Kowon County - Kumya - Hamhung - Changjin County

North Pyongan Province

- Kimhyongjik County - Chasong County

== Major intersections ==
- (■): Motorway

IS: Intersection, IC: Interchange

=== South Gyeongsang Province ===
Name	Hangul name	Connection	Location		Note
Yeoncho IS	연초삼거리	Prefectural Route 58; Prefectural Route 1018 (Geoje-daero)	Geoje City	Yeoncho-myeon	Prefectural Route 1018 overlap Terminus
Yeoncho IS	연초삼거리	Jukto-ro	Geoje City	Yeoncho-myeon	Prefectural Route 1018 overlap Terminus
No name	(이름 없음)	Daegeumsan-ro	Geoje City	Yeoncho-myeon	Prefectural Route 1018 overlap Terminus
Jangteogogae (Deokchigogae)	장터고개 (덕치고개)		Geoje City	Yeoncho-myeon	Prefectural Route 1018 overlap Terminus
Jangteogogae (Deokchigogae)			Geoje City	Hacheong-myeon	Prefectural Route 1018 overlap Terminus
Hacheong IS	하청삼거리	Yeonhahaean-ro	Geoje City	Hacheong-myeon	Prefectural Route 1018 overlap Terminus
Maengjongjuk Theme Park	맹종죽테마공원		Geoje City	Hacheong-myeon	Prefectural Route 1018 overlap Terminus
Siljeon IS	실전삼거리	Chilcheon-ro	Geoje City	Hacheong-myeon	Prefectural Route 1018 overlap Terminus
Siljeon Ferry Pier	실전카페리부두		Geoje City	Hacheong-myeon	Prefectural Route 1018 overlap Terminus
Jangdong IS	장동삼거리	Okpodaecheop-ro	Geoje City	Jangmok-myeon	Prefectural Route 1018 overlap Terminus
Front of Jangmok Nonghyup IS	장목농협앞삼거리	Geojebuk-ro	Geoje City	Jangmok-myeon	Prefectural Route 1018 overlap Terminus
Jangmok Elementary School Debeach Golf Club Dapdapgogae	장목초등학교 드비치GC 답답고개		Geoje City	Jangmok-myeon	Prefectural Route 1018 overlap Terminus
Yi Sun-sin Bridge (Geoma Bridge)	이순신대교 (거마대교)		Geoje City	Jangmok-myeon	Under construction
Yi Sun-sin Bridge (Geoma Bridge)			Changwon City	Masanhappo District Gusan-myeon	Under construction
Simri IS	심리 교차로	Prefectural Route 1002 (Isunsin-ro)	Changwon City	Masanhappo District Gusan-myeon	Under construction
Simri 1 Tunnel	심리1터널		Changwon City	Masanhappo District Gusan-myeon	Under construction Approximately 100m
Simri 2 Tunnel	심리2터널		Changwon City	Masanhappo District Gusan-myeon	Under construction Approximately 120m
Yongho IS	용호 교차로	Yongho-ro	Changwon City	Masanhappo District Gusan-myeon	Under construction
Yongho Tunnel	용호터널		Changwon City	Masanhappo District Gusan-myeon	Under construction Approximately 140m
Nanpo IS	난포 교차로	Prefectural Route 1002 (Isunsin-ro)	Changwon City	Masanhappo District Gusan-myeon	Under construction
Naepo IS	내포 교차로	Prefectural Route 1002 (Isunsin-ro)	Changwon City	Masanhappo District Gusan-myeon	Under construction
Naepo Tunnel	내포터널		Changwon City	Masanhappo District Gusan-myeon	Under construction Approximately 620m
Naepo 2 Tunnel	내포2터널		Changwon City	Masanhappo District Gusan-myeon	Under construction Approximately 633m
Seokgok Tunnel	석곡터널		Changwon City	Masanhappo District Gusan-myeon	Under construction Approximately 412m
Seokgok IS	석곡 교차로	Prefectural Route 1002 (Isunsin-ro)	Changwon City	Masanhappo District Gusan-myeon	Under construction
Yusan Tunnel	유산터널		Changwon City	Masanhappo District Gusan-myeon	Under construction Approximately 440m
Yusan Bridge	유산교		Changwon City	Masanhappo District Gusan-myeon	Under construction
Yusan Bridge			Changwon City	Masanhappo District	Under construction
Hyeondong 1 Tunnel	현동1터널		Changwon City	Masanhappo District	Under construction Approximately 320m
Hyeondong 2 Tunnel	현동2터널		Changwon City	Masanhappo District	Under construction Approximately 290m
Hyeondong JCT	현동 분기점	National Route 2 National Route 14; National Route 77; National Route 79 (Bambatgogae-ro)	Changwon City	Masanhappo District	National Route 2, National Route 14, National Route 77, National Route 79 overlap
Hyeondong IS	현동 교차로	National Route 2 National Route 77 (Namhaean-daero); National Route 14; National Route 79 (Bambatgogae-ro)	Changwon City	Masanhappo District	National Route 2, National Route 14, National Route 77, National Route 79 overlap
No name	(이름 없음)	Yegok-gil	Changwon City	Masanhappo District	
Ssaljae Tunnel	쌀재터널		Changwon City	Masanhappo District	Approximately 1465m
Ssaljae Tunnel			Changwon City	Masanhoewon District Naeseo-eup	Approximately 1465m
Gamcheon IS	감천 교차로	Gamcheon-ro	Changwon City	Masanhoewon District Naeseo-eup	
Samgye IS	삼계삼거리	Gwangnyeo-ro	Changwon City	Masanhoewon District Naeseo-eup	Prefectural Route 67 overlap
Samgye IS	삼계사거리	Samgye-ro; Jungnigongdan-ro	Changwon City	Masanhoewon District Naeseo-eup	Prefectural Route 67 overlap
Lotte Mart Samgye Store	롯데마트 삼계점		Changwon City	Masanhoewon District Naeseo-eup	Prefectural Route 67 overlap
Sanggok IS	상곡사거리	Gwangnyeocheonseo-ro; Jungnigongdan-ro 1-gil	Changwon City	Masanhoewon District Naeseo-eup	Prefectural Route 67 overlap
Naeseo Bridge	내서교		Changwon City	Masanhoewon District Naeseo-eup	Prefectural Route 67 overlap Overpass
Jungri IS	중리 교차로	Gwangnyeocheonseo-ro	Changwon City	Masanhoewon District Naeseo-eup	Prefectural Route 67 overlap
Hogye IS	호계사거리	Hogyebondong-ro	Changwon City	Masanhoewon District Naeseo-eup	Prefectural Route 67 overlap
(Unnamed bridge)	(교량 이름 미상)		Changwon City	Masanhoewon District Naeseo-eup	Prefectural Route 67 overlap
(Unnamed bridge)			Haman County	Chirwon-eup	Prefectural Route 67 overlap
Yegok IS	예곡삼거리	Howon-ro	Haman County	Chirwon-eup	Prefectural Route 67 overlap
Yachon IS	야촌삼거리	Ogok-ro	Haman County	Chirwon-eup	Prefectural Route 67 overlap
Seokjeon IS	석전삼거리	Seokjeon 1-gil Seokjeon 2-gil	Haman County	Chirwon-eup	Prefectural Route 67 overlap
Galtigokgogae Guseong Bridge	갈티곡고개 구성교		Haman County	Chirwon-eup	Prefectural Route 67 overlap
Guseong IS	구성사거리	Samchil-ro; Mugisae-gil	Haman County	Chirwon-eup	Prefectural Route 67 overlap
Unseo IS	운서 교차로	Unmu-ro	Haman County	Chirwon-eup	Prefectural Route 67 overlap
Mureung 1 Tunnel	무릉1터널		Haman County	Chirwon-eup	Prefectural Route 67 overlap Right tunnel: Approximately 470m Left tunnel: Approximately 480m
Mureung 1 Tunnel			Haman County	Chilseo-myeon	Prefectural Route 67 overlap Right tunnel: Approximately 470m Left tunnel: Approximately 480m
Mureung 2 Tunnel	무릉2터널		Haman County	Chilseo-myeon	Prefectural Route 67 overlap Right tunnel: Approximately 602m Left tunnel: Approximately 580m
Mureung 3 Tunnel	무릉3터널		Haman County	Chilseo-myeon	Prefectural Route 67 overlap Right tunnel: Approximately 600m Left tunnel: Approximately 550m
Mureung 3 Tunnel			Haman County	Chilbuk-myeon	Prefectural Route 67 overlap Right tunnel: Approximately 600m Left tunnel: Approximately 550m
Chilbuk IS	칠북 교차로	Yuseong-ro	Haman County	Chilbuk-myeon	Prefectural Route 67 overlap
Deoknam IS	덕남 교차로	Gyeryong-ro	Haman County	Chilbuk-myeon	Prefectural Route 67 overlap
Gwangryecheon Bridge	광려천교		Haman County	Chilbuk-myeon	Prefectural Route 67 overlap
Gwangryecheon Bridge			Haman County	Chilseo-myeon	Prefectural Route 67 overlap
Iryong IS	이룡 교차로	Prefectural Route 1040 (Samchil-ro)	Haman County	Chilseo-myeon	Prefectural Route 67 overlap
Nakdong Bridge	낙동대교		Haman County	Chilseo-myeon	Prefectural Route 67 overlap
Nakdong Bridge			Changnyeong County	Docheon-myeon	Prefectural Route 67 overlap
Ugang IS	우강 교차로	Prefectural Route 1022 (Nakdong-ro)	Changnyeong County	Docheon-myeon	Prefectural Route 67 overlap
Nonri IS	논리 교차로	Chiigol-gil	Changnyeong County	Docheon-myeon	Prefectural Route 67 overlap
Yeongsancheon Bridge	영산천교		Changnyeong County	Docheon-myeon	Prefectural Route 67 overlap
Yeongsancheon Bridge			Changnyeong County	Yeongsan-myeon	Prefectural Route 67 overlap
Juksa IS	죽사 교차로	Yeongsandocheon-ro	Changnyeong County	Yeongsan-myeon	Prefectural Route 67 overlap Connected with Jeongsan IC
Gyeseong IS	계성 교차로	National Route 79; Prefectural Route 67 (Yeongsanjangma-ro)	Changnyeong County	Gyeseong-myeon	Prefectural Route 67 overlap
Myeongri IS	명리 교차로	Myeongnigongdan-gil; Yeongsangyeseong-ro	Changnyeong County	Gyeseong-myeon	
Gyeseong IS	계성 교차로	Prefectural Route 1080 (Gyeseonghwawangsan-ro)	Changnyeong County	Gyeseong-myeon	
Sindang IS	신당 교차로	Yeongsangyeseong-ro	Changnyeong County	Gyeseong-myeon	
Namtonggogae	남통고개		Changnyeong County	Gyeseong-myeon	
Namtonggogae			Changnyeong County	Jangma-myeon	
Yeocho IS	여초 교차로	Yeocho 1-gil Yeocho 3-gil	Changnyeong County	Changnyeong-eup	
Chomakgol IS	초막골 교차로	Yeocho-gil; Hwajeon-gil; Chomak 2-gil	Changnyeong County	Changnyeong-eup	
Public Stadium IS	공설운동장삼거리	Changnyeong-daero	Changnyeong County	Changnyeong-eup	
Gaesan Bridge	개산교	Tamha-ro	Changnyeong County	Changnyeong-eup	
Songgot Bridge	송곳교		Changnyeong County	Changnyeong-eup	
Daeji IS	대지 교차로	Prefectural Route 1080 (Upo 2-ro)	Changnyeong County	Daeji-myeon	
Wangsan Bridge	왕산교		Changnyeong County	Daeji-myeon	
Wangsan IS	왕산사거리	Eongmanmisan-ro	Changnyeong County	Daeji-myeon	
Eoeun IS	어은삼거리	Wonchoneoeun-gil	Changnyeong County	Daeji-myeon	
Mojeon IS	모전삼거리		Changnyeong County	Daehap-myeon	
Mojeon IS	모전사거리	Mojeon-ro; Seoksil-gil	Changnyeong County	Daehap-myeon	
Sujang IS	수장사거리	Sujangtoesan-ro; Sujang-gil	Changnyeong County	Daehap-myeon	
Janggi IS	장기사거리	Maetan-gil	Changnyeong County	Daehap-myeon	
Agriculture Complex IS	농공단지삼거리	Daehapgongdan-gil	Changnyeong County	Daehap-myeon	
Musol IS	무솔사거리	Pyeongjitoesan-ro	Changnyeong County	Daehap-myeon	
Deungji IS	등지 교차로	Prefectural Route 1034 (Palmundong-gil); Changhan-ro	Changnyeong County	Daehap-myeon	
Daegyeon IS	대견 교차로	Daegyeonwolpo-ro	Changnyeong County	Seongsan-myeon	Continuation into Daegu

=== Daegu ===
Name	Hangul name	Connection	Location		Note
Hanjeong 1 Bridge	한정1교	Gwahaknam-ro	Dalseong County	Guji-myeon	South Gyeongsang Province - Daegu border line
Pyeongchon IS	평촌 교차로	Gujidong-ro	Dalseong County	Guji-myeon	
Pyeongchon Bridge	평촌교		Dalseong County	Guji-myeon	
Guji Overpass	구지육교	Gukgasandanbuk-ro; Techno sunhwan-ro	Dalseong County	Hyeonpung-myeon	
Daegu Dalseong Fire Station	대구달성소방서	Technonam-ro; Biseul-ro 96-gil	Dalseong County	Hyeonpung-myeon	
Posan High School IS	포산고사거리	Techno-daero; Hyeonpungjungang-ro	Dalseong County	Hyeonpung-myeon	
(Front of Dalseong Post Office)	(달성우체국앞)	Hyeonpungseo-ro; Biseul-ro 130-gil	Dalseong County	Hyeonpung-myeon	
Hyeonpung 3 Bridge Hyeonpung High School Hyeonpung Middle School	현풍3교 현풍고등학교 현풍중학교		Dalseong County	Hyeonpung-myeon	
No name	(이름 없음)	Hyeonpungdong-ro; Hyeonpungjungang-ro	Dalseong County	Hyeonpung-myeon	
(East of Bakseokjin Bridge)	(박석진교 동단)	Nongong-ro	Dalseong County	Hyeonpung-myeon	
(Gongdan Wastewater Treatment Plant)	(공단하수처리장앞)	Nongongjungang-ro	Dalseong County	Nongong-eup	
Nongong IS	논공삼거리	Nongong-ro	Dalseong County	Nongong-eup	
Yaksan Oncheon Entrance IS	약산온천입구 교차로	Yaksandeotjae-gil	Dalseong County	Nongong-eup	
Wicheon IS	위천 교차로	National Route 26 (Donggoryeong-ro)	Dalseong County	Nongong-eup	National Route 26 overlap
Wicheon IS	위천삼거리	Seongsan-ro	Dalseong County	Nongong-eup	National Route 26 overlap
Seungho IS	승호 교차로	Sam-ri 2-gil	Dalseong County	Nongong-eup	National Route 26 overlap
Nongong-eup Office	논공읍사무소		Dalseong County	Nongong-eup	National Route 26 overlap
Geumpo 1 IS	금포1 교차로	Geumpo-ro	Dalseong County	Nongong-eup	National Route 26 overlap
Geumpo 2 IS	금포2 교차로	Dalseongguncheong-ro	Dalseong County	Nongong-eup	National Route 26 overlap
Gangrim 1 IS	강림1 교차로	Sijeo-ro	Dalseong County	Okpo-myeon	National Route 26 overlap
Kyungso Middle School	경서중학교		Dalseong County	Okpo-myeon	National Route 26 overlap
Gangrim 2 IS	강림2 교차로	Biseul-ro 387-gil	Dalseong County	Okpo-myeon	National Route 26 overlap
Gangrim 3 IS	강림3 교차로	Dolmi-ro	Dalseong County	Okpo-myeon	National Route 26 overlap
Okpo Underpass	옥포지하차도	Dolmisangeop-ro	Dalseong County	Okpo-myeon	National Route 26 overlap
Gyohang IS	교항 교차로	Dolmi-ro; Geumgye-gil	Dalseong County	Okpo-myeon	National Route 26 overlap
Okpo-myeon Office Daegu Okpo Elementary School	옥포면사무소 대구옥포초등학교		Dalseong County	Okpo-myeon	National Route 26 overlap
Bonri IS	본리 교차로	Biseul-ro 447-gil	Dalseong County	Okpo-myeon	National Route 26 overlap
Hwawon-Okpo IC (Hwawon-Okpo IC IS) (Gise Bridge)	화원옥포 나들목 (화원옥포IC네거리) (기세교)	Jungbu Naeryuk Expressway Branch; Biseul-ro 468-gil	Dalseong County	Okpo-myeon	National Route 26 overlap
(Former Hwawon IC Entrance)	(구 화원 나들목 입구)	Biseul-ro 481-gil	Dalseong County	Hwawon-eup	National Route 26 overlap
Hwawon High School	화원고등학교		Dalseong County	Hwawon-eup	National Route 26 overlap
Seolhwa-Myeonggok Station	설화명곡역	Seongcheon-ro; Hwaam-ro	Dalseong County	Hwawon-eup	National Route 26 overlap
Hwawon Bridge	화원교		Dalseong County	Hwawon-eup	National Route 26 overlap
Hwawon IS	화원삼거리	Samunjin-ro	Dalseong County	Hwawon-eup	National Route 26 overlap
Daegu Hwawon Elementary School Hwawon-eup Office	대구화원초등학교 화원읍사무소		Dalseong County	Hwawon-eup	National Route 26 overlap
Hwawon Station	화원역	Gura-ro	Dalseong County	Hwawon-eup	National Route 26 overlap
Hannam Beauty & Information High School Daewon High School	한남미용정보고등학교 대원고등학교		Dalseong County	Hwawon-eup	National Route 26 overlap
Daegok station	대곡역	Myeongcheon-ro; Biseul-ro 543-gil	Daegu	Dalseo District	National Route 26 overlap
Yucheon IS	유천네거리	Dalseo-daero; Sanghwa-ro	Daegu	Dalseo District	National Route 26 overlap
Jincheon IS (Jincheon Station)	진천네거리 (진천역)	Jincheon-ro	Daegu	Dalseo District	National Route 26 overlap
Wolbae Market IS	월배시장 교차로	Wolbae-ro 22-gil Wolbae-ro 23-gil Wolbae-ro 24-gil	Daegu	Dalseo District	National Route 26 overlap
Wolbae Elementary School (Wolbae Station)	월배초등학교 (월배역)		Daegu	Dalseo District	National Route 26 overlap
Sangin IS (Sangin Station)	상인네거리 (상인역)	Wolgok-ro	Daegu	Dalseo District	National Route 26 overlap
Lotte Department Store Sangin Store Daegu Sangwon High School Daegu Transportation Corporation Gyeongbuk Machinery Technical High School Daeseo Middle School	롯데백화점 상인점 대구상원고등학교 대구도시철도공사 경북기계공업고등학교 대서중학교		Daegu	Dalseo District	National Route 26 overlap
Wolchon Station IS (Wolchon Station)	월촌역 교차로 (월촌역)	Songhyeon-ro	Daegu	Dalseo District	National Route 26 overlap
Songhyeon Station	송현역		Daegu	Dalseo District	National Route 26 overlap
Kaya Hospital IS	가야기독병원삼거리	Wolbae-ro 85-gil	Daegu	Dalseo District	National Route 26 overlap
Seongdang IS (Seongdangmot Station) (Daegu Seobu Bus Terminal)	성당네거리 (성당못역) (대구서부정류장)	Prefectural Route 30 (Daemyeong-ro); Guma-ro	Daegu	Dalseo District	National Route 26 overlap Prefectural Route 30 overlap
Duribong IS	두리봉네거리	Daemyeongcheon-ro	Daegu	Dalseo District	National Route 26 overlap Prefectural Route 30 overlap
Duryu Park IS	두류공원네거리	Duryugongwon-ro; Seongdang-ro	Daegu	Dalseo District	National Route 26 overlap Prefectural Route 30 overlap
Duryu Stadium E-World Duryu Library	두류운동장 이월드 두류도서관		Daegu	Dalseo District	National Route 26 overlap Prefectural Route 30 overlap
No name	(이름 없음)	Yaoeeumakdang-ro	Daegu	Dalseo District	National Route 26 overlap Prefectural Route 30 overlap
Daegu Shinhung Elementary School	대구신흥초등학교		Daegu	Dalseo District	National Route 26 overlap Prefectural Route 30 overlap
Duryu IS (Duryu Station)	두류네거리 (두류역)	National Route 30 (Dalgubeol-daero)	Daegu	Seo District	National Route 26 overlap Prefectural Route 30 overlap
Nampyeong-ri IS	남평리네거리	Pyeongni-ro	Daegu	Seo District	
Sinpyeong-ri IS	신평리네거리	Gukchaebosang-ro	Daegu	Seo District	
Pyeongni Gwangmyeong IS	평리광명네거리	Munhwa-ro	Daegu	Seo District	
Pyeongni IS	평리네거리	Bukbisan-ro	Daegu	Seo District	
Pyeongni Underpass	평리지하차도		Daegu	Seo District	
Pyeongni Bridge	평리교	Dalseocheon-ro	Daegu	Seo District	
Daegu Bukbu Bus Terminal IS	대구북부정류장 교차로	Seodaegu-ro 62-gil	Daegu	Seo District	
Manpyeong IS (Seodaegu Express Bus Terminal) (Manpyeong Station)	만평네거리 (서대구고속버스터미널) (만평역)	National Route 4 National Route 25 (Nowon-ro)	Daegu	North:Buk District; South:Seo District	National Route 4, National Route 25 overlap
Gongdan Station	공단역		Daegu	North:Buk District; South:Seo District	National Route 4, National Route 25 overlap
Paldal Bridge IS	팔달교 교차로	Sincheon-daero	Daegu	North:Buk District; South:Seo District	National Route 4, National Route 25 overlap
Paldal Bridge	팔달교		Daegu	North:Buk District; South:Seo District	National Route 4, National Route 25 overlap
Paldal Bridge			Daegu	Buk District	National Route 4, National Route 25 overlap
Daegu Bukbu Freight Terminal	대구북부화물터미널		Daegu	Buk District	National Route 4, National Route 25 overlap
Paldal-ro IS (Paldal Overpass) (Maecheon Market Station)	팔달로 교차로 (팔달고가차도) (매천시장역)	Maecheon-ro 18-gil	Daegu	Buk District	National Route 4, National Route 25 overlap
Taejeon Station	태전역		Daegu	Buk District	National Route 4, National Route 25 overlap
Taejeon IS	태전삼거리	National Route 4 (Taejeon-ro)	Daegu	Buk District	National Route 4, National Route 25 overlap
Driver's License Test Center	운전면허시험장	Taeamnam-ro; Chilgokjungang-daero 65-gil	Daegu	Buk District	National Route 25 overlap
Taegu Science University IS	대구과학대학 교차로	Taeam-ro	Daegu	Buk District	National Route 25 overlap
Chilgok IS (Chilgok Underpass)	칠곡네거리 (칠곡지하차도)	Guam-ro	Daegu	Buk District	National Route 25 overlap Connected with Chilgok IC
Catholic University of Daegu Chilgok Catholic Hospital	대구가톨릭대학교 칠곡가톨릭병원		Daegu	Buk District	National Route 25 overlap Continuation into North Gyeongsang Province
Chilgok Elementary School IS	칠곡초등학교 교차로	Gwaneumjungang-ro	Daegu	Buk District	National Route 25 overlap Continuation into North Gyeongsang Province
Eupnae-dong Community Center	읍내동주민센터		Daegu	Buk District	National Route 25 overlap Continuation into North Gyeongsang Province
Chilgok Post Office IS	칠곡우체국 교차로	Dongam-ro; Chilgokjungang-daero 115-gil	Daegu	Buk District	National Route 25 overlap Continuation into North Gyeongsang Province
Chilgok Middle School	칠곡중학교		Daegu	Buk District	National Route 25 overlap Continuation into North Gyeongsang Province
No name	(이름 없음)	Hoguk-ro	Daegu	Buk District	National Route 25 overlap Continuation into North Gyeongsang Province
Dongho Police Station	동호치안센터		Daegu	Buk District	National Route 25 overlap Continuation into North Gyeongsang Province

=== North Gyeongsang Province ===
Name	Hangul name	Connection	Location		Note
Gangbuk Gas Station	강북주유소		Chilgok County	Dongmyeong-myeon	National Route 25 overlap Daegu - North Gyeongsang Province border line
Dongmyeong IS	동명사거리	Prefectural Route 79 (Hanti-ro); Geumam 2-gil	Chilgok County	Dongmyeong-myeon	National Route 25 overlap Prefectural Route 79 overlap
No name	(이름 없음)	Geumamjungang-gil	Chilgok County	Dongmyeong-myeon	National Route 25 overlap Prefectural Route 79 overlap
No name	(이름 없음)	Namwon-ro	Chilgok County	Dongmyeong-myeon	National Route 25 overlap Prefectural Route 79 overlap
Soyanggogae	소야고개		Chilgok County	Dongmyeong-myeon	National Route 25 overlap Prefectural Route 79 overlap
Soyanggogae			Chilgok County	Gasan-myeon	National Route 25 overlap Prefectural Route 79 overlap
Dabuwon	다부원앞	Prefectural Route 79; Prefectural Route 923 (Dabuwon 1-gil)	Chilgok County	Gasan-myeon	National Route 25 overlap Prefectural Route 79, 923 overlap
Dabudong Victory Monument Gasan Elementary School Gasan-myeon Office	다부동전승비 가산초등학교 가산면사무소		Chilgok County	Gasan-myeon	National Route 25 overlap Prefectural Route 923 overlap
Cheonpyeong IS	천평삼거리	National Route 25; Prefectural Route 923 (Nakdong-daero)	Chilgok County	Gasan-myeon	National Route 25 overlap Prefectural Route 923 overlap
Gasan IC	가산 나들목	Jungang Expressway	Chilgok County	Gasan-myeon	
No name	(이름 없음)	Prefectural Route 514 (Indonggasan-ro)	Chilgok County	Gasan-myeon	Prefectural Route 514 overlap
Nonghyup Gunwi Distribution Center	농협군위유통센터		Gunwi County	Hyoryeong-myeon	Prefectural Route 514 overlap
Guhyoryeong Bus Stop	구효령정류소	Prefectural Route 514 (Janggun-ro)	Gunwi County	Hyoryeong-myeon	Prefectural Route 514 overlap
Kyungpook University Natural History Museum (Former Janggun Elementary School)	경북대학교 자연사박물관 (구 장군초등학교)		Gunwi County	Hyoryeong-myeon	
Junggu IS	중구삼거리	Junggu 2-gil	Gunwi County	Hyoryeong-myeon	
Hyoryeong Bridge	효령교		Gunwi County	Hyoryeong-myeon	
Hyoryeong IS	효령삼거리	Prefectural Route 919 (Chisanhyoryeong-ro)	Gunwi County	Hyoryeong-myeon	Prefectural Route 919 overlap
Bulro IS	불로삼거리	Bullo-gil	Gunwi County	Hyoryeong-myeon	Prefectural Route 919 overlap
Byeongcheon Bridge	병천교		Gunwi County	Hyoryeong-myeon	Prefectural Route 919 overlap
Gandong IS	간동삼거리	Prefectural Route 919 (Hyou-ro)	Gunwi County	Hyoryeong-myeon	Prefectural Route 919 overlap
Gunwi Student Culture Experience Center (Former Gunwi Nambu Elementary School)	군위학생문화예술체험장 (구 군위남부초등학교)		Gunwi County	Gunwi-eup	
Gunwi IC (Gunwi IC IS)	군위 나들목 (군위IC 교차로)	Jungang Expressway; National Route 67 (Jangcheon-ro)	Gunwi County	Gunwi-eup	
No name	(이름 없음)	Guncheong-ro	Gunwi County	Gunwi-eup	
Gunwi Bridge	군위교	Prefectural Route 68; Prefectural Route 927 (Dogun-ro)	Gunwi County	Gunwi-eup	Prefectural Route 68 overlap
No name	(이름 없음)	Daebuk-gil	Gunwi County	Gunwi-eup	Prefectural Route 68 overlap
Uiseong IC (Uiseong Overpass)	의성 나들목 (의성고가차도)	Jungang Expressway	Uiseong County	Bongyang-myeon	Prefectural Route 68 overlap
Dowon IS	도원삼거리	Nonggongmajeon-gil	Uiseong County	Bongyang-myeon	Prefectural Route 68 overlap
(Dowon-ri)	(도원리)	Bonggi-gil	Uiseong County	Bongyang-myeon	Prefectural Route 68 overlap
Doriwon 2 Bridge	도리원2교		Uiseong County	Bongyang-myeon	Prefectural Route 68 overlap
Bongyang IS (Bongyang Viaduct)	봉양 교차로 (봉양고가교)	National Route 28 (Seobu-ro); Doriwon 3-gil	Uiseong County	Bongyang-myeon	National Route 28 overlap Prefectural Route 68 overlap
Oncheon IS	온천삼거리	Prefectural Route 927 (Bongho-ro); Doriwon 2-gil	Uiseong County	Bongyang-myeon	National Route 28 overlap Prefectural Route 68, 927 overlap
Gumi IS	구미삼거리	Prefectural Route 927 (Jomun-ro)	Uiseong County	Bongyang-myeon	National Route 28 overlap Prefectural Route 68, 927 overlap
Uiseong County Agricultural Technology Center	의성군농업기술센터		Uiseong County	Bongyang-myeon	National Route 28 overlap Prefectural Route 68 overlap
Bunto Bridge	분토교		Uiseong County	Bongyang-myeon	National Route 28 overlap Prefectural Route 68 overlap
Bunto Bridge			Uiseong County	Uiseong-eup	National Route 28 overlap Prefectural Route 68 overlap
Yongyeon-ri	용연리	Prefectural Route 68 (Bibong-gil)	Uiseong County	Uiseong-eup	National Route 28 overlap Prefectural Route 68 overlap
Yongyeon Bridge	용연교	Yongyeon 1-gil	Uiseong County	Uiseong-eup	National Route 28 overlap
Wondang IS	원당 교차로	National Route 28 (Dongbu-ro)	Uiseong County	Uiseong-eup	National Route 28 overlap
Wondang IS	원당삼거리	Prefectural Route 914 (Hongsul-ro)	Uiseong County	Uiseong-eup	Prefectural Route 914 overlap
Uiseong 2 Bridge	의성2교		Uiseong County	Uiseong-eup	Prefectural Route 914 overlap
Cheolpa IS	철파사거리	Prefectural Route 912 (Anpyeonguiseong-ro)	Uiseong County	Uiseong-eup	Prefectural Route 914 overlap
Jaeraetjae	재랫재		Uiseong County	Uiseong-eup	Prefectural Route 914 overlap
Jaeraetjae			Uiseong County	Danchon-myeon	Prefectural Route 914 overlap
North Uiseong IC	북의성 나들목	Dangjin-Yeongdeok Expressway	Uiseong County	Danchon-myeon	
Sechon IS	세촌삼거리	Singi-gil	Uiseong County	Danchon-myeon	Prefectural Route 914 overlap
Anse Bridge	안세교		Uiseong County	Danchon-myeon	Prefectural Route 914 overlap
Sechon IS	세촌 교차로	Singi-gil	Uiseong County	Danchon-myeon	Prefectural Route 914 overlap
Segok 1 IS	세곡1 교차로	Dongnaegaegol-gil	Uiseong County	Danchon-myeon	Prefectural Route 914 overlap
Sechon Overpass	세촌과선교		Uiseong County	Danchon-myeon	Prefectural Route 914 overlap
Sechon 2 IS	세촌2 교차로	Gwangyeon-gil	Uiseong County	Danchon-myeon	Prefectural Route 914 overlap
Sechon 2 IS		Gwangyeon-gil	Andong City	Iljik-myeon	Prefectural Route 914 overlap
Mangho IS	망호 교차로	Prefectural Route 79 (Iljikjeomgok-ro)	Andong City	Iljik-myeon	Prefectural Route 914 overlap
Iljik Bridge	일직교		Andong City	Iljik-myeon	Prefectural Route 914 overlap
Unsan IS	운산 교차로	Prefectural Route 914 (Pungil-ro)	Andong City	Iljik-myeon	Prefectural Route 914 overlap
Songri Bridge	송리교		Andong City	Iljik-myeon	
Gwangeum 1 Bridge	광음1교		Andong City	Iljik-myeon	
Gwangeum 1 Bridge			Andong City	Namhu-myeon	
Gwangeum IS	광음 교차로	Keungwangeum-gil	Andong City	Namhu-myeon	
Gwangeum 3 Bridge Namru Bridge	광음3교 남루교		Andong City	Namhu-myeon	
Mureung IS	무릉 교차로	Mureung-gil; Mureung 1-gil	Andong City	Namhu-myeon	
Namhu 1 Bridge Namhu 2 Bridge	남후1교 남후2교		Andong City	Namhu-myeon	
No name	(이름 없음)	Mureung-gil	Andong City	Namhu-myeon	
Saan Bridge	사안교		Andong City	Namhu-myeon	
Saan Bridge			Andong City	Gangnam-dong	
Mureung Overpass	무릉육교		Andong City	Gangnam-dong	
Hanti IS	한티 교차로	National Route 34 (Namsunhwan-ro)	Andong City	Gangnam-dong	
No name	(이름 없음)	Gangnam-ro	Andong City	Gangnam-dong	
Andong Bridge	안동대교		Andong City	Gangnam-dong	
Andong Bridge			Andong City	Taehwa-dong	
North of Andong Bridge	안동대교북단	Haima-ro	Andong City	Taehwa-dong	
Eogagol IS	어가골 교차로	Yuksa-ro	Andong City	Taehwa-dong	
Okdong IS	옥동사거리	Gwangmyeong-ro	Andong City	Ok-dong	
Okdong3jugong	옥동3주공 교차로	Eunhaengnamu-ro	Andong City	Songha-dong	
Songhyeon IS	송현오거리	Gyeongdong-ro	Andong City	Songha-dong	Songha 1-gil
Maehwagol IS	매화골 교차로	Maehwa-gil	Andong City	Angi-dong	
Duu Bridge	두우교		Andong City	Angi-dong	
Jebiwon Bridge	제비원교	Isongcheonhanti-gil	Andong City	Seohu-myeon	
Jebiwon IS	제비원 교차로	Jebiwon-ro	Andong City	Seohu-myeon	
Osan IS	오산 교차로	Prefectural Route 924 (Ihaosan-ro); Bukpyeong-ro	Andong City	Seohu-myeon	Prefectural Route 924 overlap
Seohu IS	서후 교차로	Prefectural Route 924 (Pungsantaesa-ro)	Andong City	Seohu-myeon	Prefectural Route 924 overlap
Dochon IS	도촌 교차로	Bukpyeong-ro; Mulhan-gil	Andong City	Bukhu-myeon	
Janggi Bridge	장기교		Andong City	Bukhu-myeon	
Bukhu IS	북후 교차로	Bukpyeong-ro	Andong City	Bukhu-myeon	
Jigok Bridge	지곡교		Andong City	Bukhu-myeon	
Jigok Bridge			Yeongju City	Pyeongeun-myeon	
Jigok IS	지곡 교차로	Prefectural Route 928 (Nokji-ro) (Bukpyeong-ro)	Yeongju City	Pyeongeun-myeon	
Gosa-dong IS	고사동 교차로	Gyeongbuk-daero 2229beon-gil	Yeongju City	Pyeongeun-myeon	
Oun Overpass	오운육교	Prefectural Route 915 (Yebong-ro)	Yeongju City	Pyeongeun-myeon	
Oun Tunnel	오운터널		Yeongju City	Pyeongeun-myeon	Right tunnel: Approximately 662m Left tunnel: Approximately 622m
Saeteo Overpass Saeteo Bridge	새터육교 새터교		Yeongju City	Pyeongeun-myeon	
Pyeongeun Tunnel	평은터널		Yeongju City	Pyeongeun-myeon	Right tunnel: Approximately 540m Left tunnel: Approximately 545m
Gangdong Bridge	강동교		Yeongju City	Pyeongeun-myeon	
Pyeongeun IS	평은 교차로	Cheonsang-ro	Yeongju City	Pyeongeun-myeon	
Naeseongcheon Bridge	내성천교		Yeongju City	Pyeongeun-myeon	
Naeseongcheon Bridge			Yeongju City	Isan-myeon	
Unmun IS	운문 교차로	Ganun-ro 494beon-gil	Yeongju City	Isan-myeon	
Munsu IS	문수 교차로	Ganun-ro; Jongneung-ro	Yeongju City	Munsu-myeon	
Jeokdong Overpass	적동과선교		Yeongju City	Munsu-myeon	
Jeokseo IS	적서 교차로	Ganun-ro; Jeokseo-ro	Yeongju City	Munsu-myeon	
Sail Bridge	사일교		Yeongju City	Munsu-myeon	
Sail Bridge			Yeongju City	Hyucheon-dong	
Chogok Overpass	초곡과선교		Yeongju City	Hyucheon-dong	
Munjeong Bridge	문정교		Yeongju City	Hyucheon-dong	
Munjeong Bridge			Yeongju City	Gaheung-dong	
Munjeong IS	문정 교차로	National Route 28 (Gaheung-ro)	Yeongju City	Gaheung-dong	
Gaheung IS	가흥 교차로	National Route 36 (Gyeongbuk-daero); Yeongju-ro	Yeongju City	Gaheung-dong	National Route 36 overlap
Naejul IS	내줄 교차로	Jangan-ro	Yeongju City	Anjeong-myeon	National Route 36 overlap
Sinjeon IS	신전 교차로	Sinjae-ro; Jangan-ro	Yeongju City	Anjeong-myeon	National Route 36 overlap
Anjeong 1 Bridge	안정1교		Yeongju City	Bonghyeon-myeon	National Route 36 overlap
Bonghyeon IS	봉현 교차로	Prefectural Route 28 (Ohyeon-ro); Prefectural Route 931 (Sobaek-ro)	Yeongju City	Bonghyeon-myeon	National Route 36 overlap
Punggi Bridge	풍기교		Yeongju City	Bonghyeon-myeon	National Route 36 overlap
Punggi Bridge			Yeongju City	Punggi-eup	National Route 36 overlap
Baekri IS	백리 교차로	Giju-ro	Yeongju City	Punggi-eup	National Route 36 overlap
Sobaeksan Punggi Spa	소백산풍기온천리조트		Yeongju City	Punggi-eup	National Route 36 overlap
Sucheol-ri Entrance	수철리입구	Jungnyeong-ro 1513beon-gil Sobaeksan Station	Yeongju City	Punggi-eup	National Route 36 overlap
Huibang IS	희방삼거리	Huibangsa	Yeongju City	Punggi-eup	National Route 36 overlap
Jungnyeong	죽령		Yeongju City	Punggi-eup	National Route 36 overlap Elevation 696m Continuation into North Chungcheong Province

=== North Chungcheong Province ===
Name	Hangul name	Connection	Location		Note
Jungnyeong	죽령		Danyang County	Daegang-myeon	National Route 36 overlap Elevation 696m North Gyeongsang Province - North Chungcheong Province border line
Jungnyeong Station	죽령역	Yongbuwon 2-gil	Danyang County	Daegang-myeon	National Route 36 overlap
Danyang IC (Daegang IS)	단양 나들목 (대강 교차로)	Jungang Expressway	Danyang County	Daegang-myeon	National Route 36 overlap
Jangrim IS	장림사거리	Prefectural Route 927 (Sainam-ro)	Danyang County	Daegang-myeon	National Route 36 overlap
Bukha IS	북하삼거리	National Route 36; National Route 59 (Worak-ro)	Danyang County	Danseong-myeon	National Route 36 overlap National Route 59 overlap
Danseong Station	단성역		Danyang County	Danseong-myeon	National Route 59 overlap
Deokseong Bridge Hyeoncheon Bridge Danyang Station Sangjin Bridge	덕상교 현천교 단양역 상진대교		Danyang County	Danyang-eup	National Route 59 overlap
Danyang IS (Danyang IS) (Sangjin IS)	단양삼거리 (단양 교차로) (상진 교차로)	National Route 59 (Sambong-ro)	Danyang County	Danyang-eup	National Route 59 overlap
Jeokseong IS	적성삼거리	Suyanggaeyujeok-ro	Danyang County	Danyang-eup	
Eouigok IS	어의곡 교차로	Eungsil-gil	Danyang County	Maepo-eup	
Hagoe IS	하괴삼거리	Sambong-ro	Danyang County	Maepo-eup	
Udeok IS	우덕삼거리	Danyangsaneopdanji-ro	Danyang County	Maepo-eup	
Maepo IS	매포삼거리	Pyeongdong-ro	Danyang County	Maepo-eup	
Andong IS	안동삼거리	Maepo-gil	Danyang County	Maepo-eup	
Pyeongdong IS	평동삼거리	Prefectural Route 532 (Pyeongdong 1-ro)	Danyang County	Maepo-eup	Prefectural Route 532 overlap
Pyeongdong Express Bus Stop Maepo Elementary School	평동직행버스정류소 매포초등학교		Danyang County	Maepo-eup	Prefectural Route 532 overlap
Hasi IS	하시삼거리	Prefectural Route 532 (Maepoeosangcheon-ro)	Danyang County	Maepo-eup	Prefectural Route 532 overlap
Danyang Underpass Andong 1 Bridge Andong 2 Bridge	단양지하차도 안동1교 안동2교		Danyang County	Maepo-eup	
Gomyeong Station Entrance	고명역입구	Danyang-ro 10-gil	Jecheon City	Sinbaek-dong	
Gomyeong IS	고명 교차로	National Route 38 (Bukbu-ro)	Jecheon City	Sinbaek-dong	National Route 38 overlap
Myeongji IS	명지 교차로	Prefectural Route 82 (Cheongpungho-ro)	Jecheon City	Hwasan-dong	National Route 38 overlap
Sindong IS	신동 교차로	Naeto-ro; Jecheonbuk-ro	Jecheon City	Yeongseo-dong	National Route 38 overlap
Gomo IS (Jecheon IC)	고모 교차로 (제천 나들목)	Jungang Expressway	Jecheon City	Bongyang-eup	National Route 38 overlap
Gosan IS (Jecheon IC)	고산 교차로 (제천 나들목)	Jungang Expressway	Jecheon City	Bongyang-eup	National Route 38 overlap
Bongyang Station	봉양역		Jecheon City	Bongyang-eup	National Route 38 overlap
Jangpyeong IS	장평삼거리	National Route 38 (Bukbu-ro)	Jecheon City	Bongyang-eup	National Route 38 overlap
Jupo IS	주포사거리	Jupo-ro; Jewon-ro 2-gil	Jecheon City	Bongyang-eup	
Jupo IS	주포삼거리	Jupo-ro 7-gil	Jecheon City	Bongyang-eup	
Bongyang IS	봉양삼거리	Yongdu-daero	Jecheon City	Bongyang-eup	
Palsong Bridge Guhak Station	팔송대교 구학역		Jecheon City	Bongyang-eup	
Baeronseongji IS	배론성지삼거리	Baeronseongji-gil	Jecheon City	Bongyang-eup	
Taksajeong IS	탁사정삼거리		Jecheon City	Bongyang-eup	
Guhak Bridge Taksajeong Haksan Bridge	구학교 탁사정 학산교		Jecheon City	Bongyang-eup	
Haksan-ri	학산리		Jecheon City	Bongyang-eup	Continuation into Gangwon Province

=== Gangwon Province ===
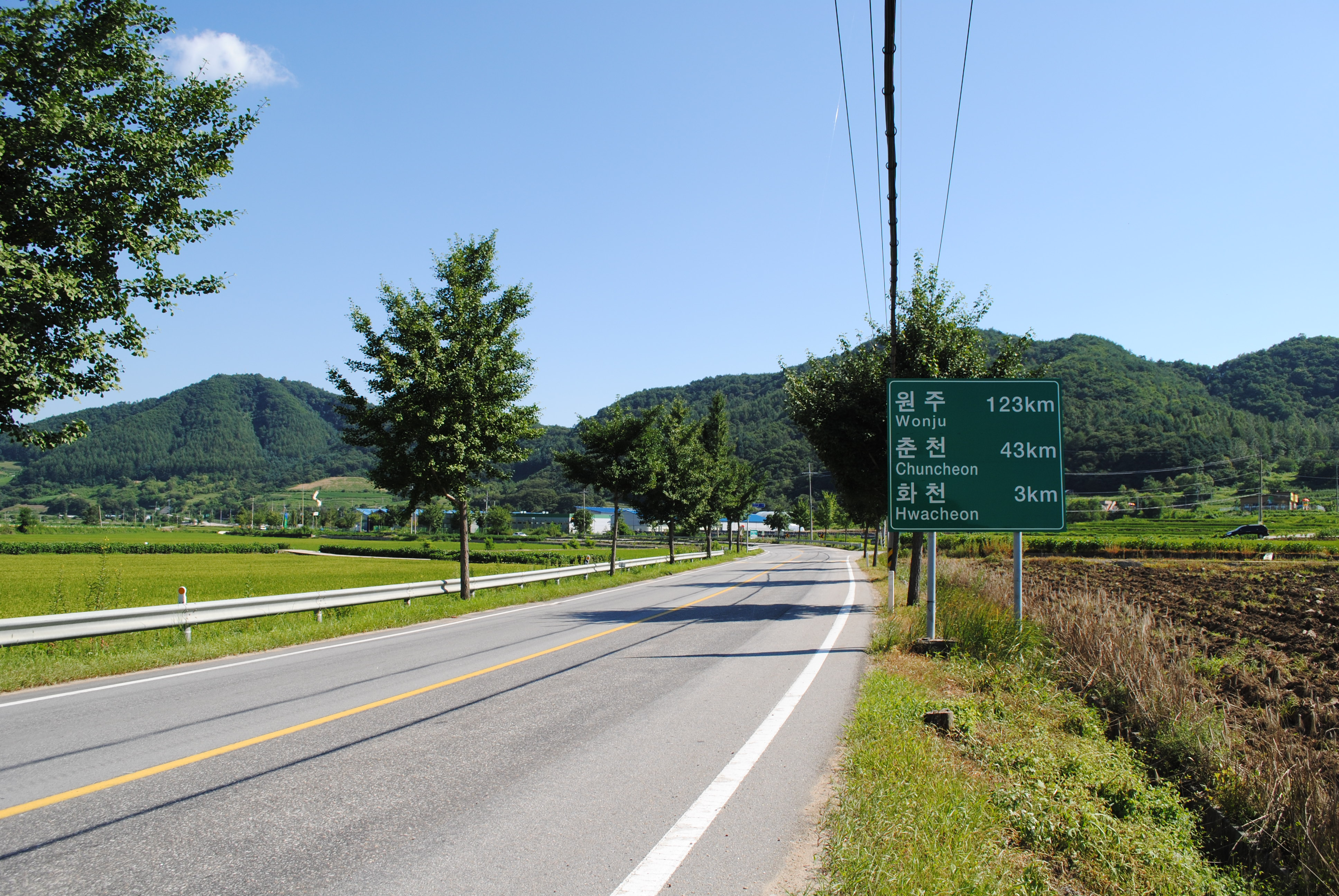
At Hwacheon

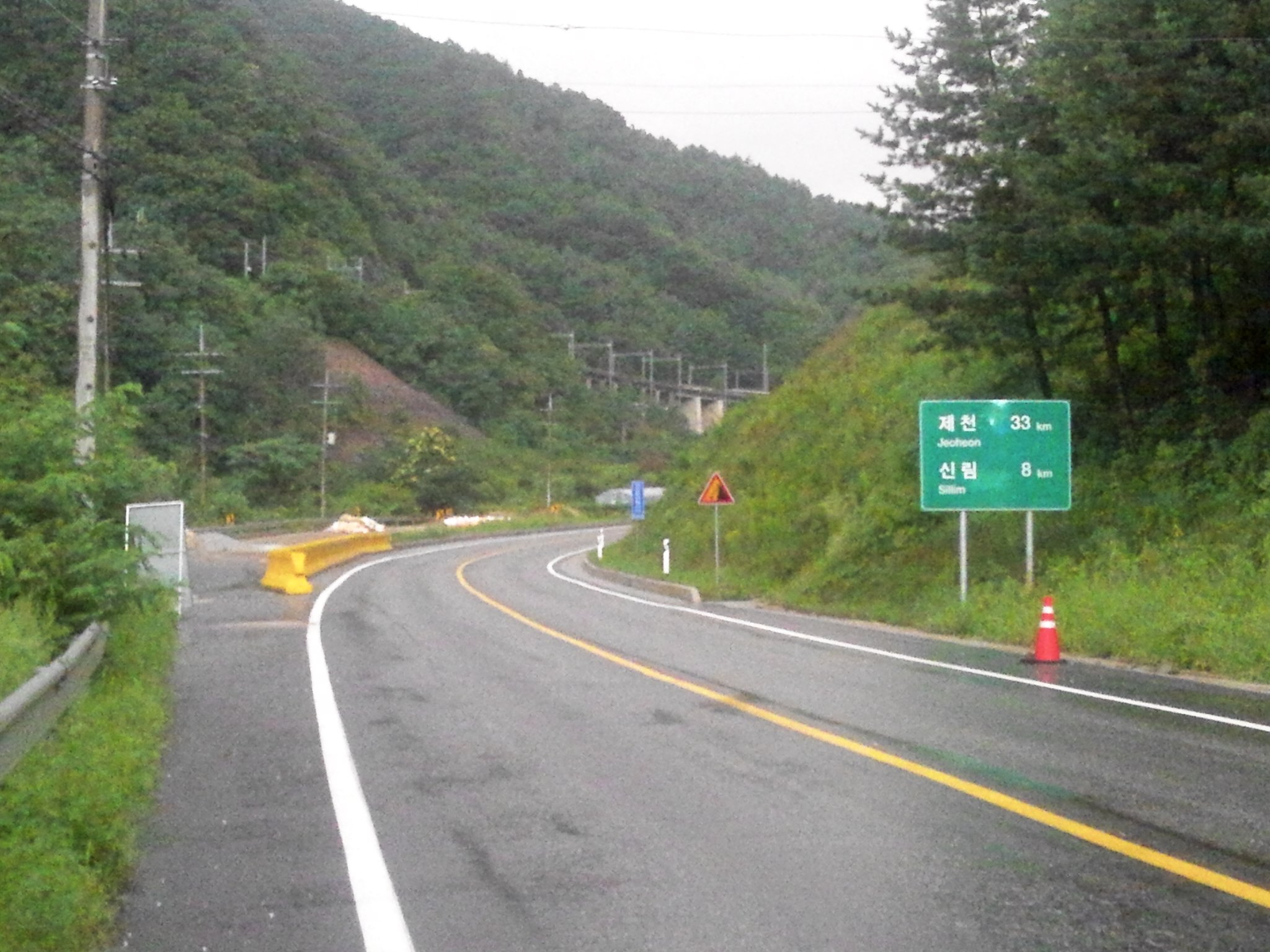
National Route 5 at Panbu-myeon, Gangwon Province.

Name	Hangul name	Connection	Location		Note
Yongam-ro	용암리		Wonju City	Sinlim-myeon	North Chungcheong Province - Gangwon Province border line
Yongam IS	용암삼거리	Prefectural Route 597 (Guhaksan-ro)	Wonju City	Sinlim-myeon	Former Prefectural Route 402
Sillim Station	신림역	Jeongam-gil	Wonju City	Sinlim-myeon	
Sinlim Intercity Bus Stop	신림시외버스정류장		Wonju City	Sinlim-myeon	
Sinlim IS	신림삼거리	Prefectural Route 88 (Sillimhwangdun-ro)	Wonju City	Sinlim-myeon	Prefectural Route 88 overlap
Sinlim-myeon Office Sinlim Elementary School Changgyo Station	신림면사무소 신림초등학교 창교역		Wonju City	Sinlim-myeon	Prefectural Route 88 overlap
Chiakjae (Garipagogae)	치악재 (가리파고개)		Wonju City	Sinlim-myeon	Prefectural Route 88 overlap Elevation 450m
Chiakjae (Garipagogae)			Wonju City	Panbu-myeon	Prefectural Route 88 overlap Elevation 450m
Chiak Station	치악역		Wonju City	Panbu-myeon	Prefectural Route 88 overlap
Geumdae IS	금대삼거리	Yeongwonsanseong-gil	Wonju City	Panbu-myeon	Prefectural Route 88 overlap
Geumdae Elementary School Entrance	금대초등학교입구	Geumdae-gil	Wonju City	Panbu-myeon	Prefectural Route 88 overlap
Gwanseol Bridge Gwanseol Elementary School	관설교 관설초등학교		Wonju City	Bangokgwanseol-dong	Prefectural Route 88 overlap
Yeongseo High School (Yeongseo High IS)	영서고등학교 (영서고삼거리)		Wonju City	Bangokgwanseol-dong	Prefectural Route 88 overlap
Gwanseol IS	관설 교차로	National Route 19; National Route 42; Prefectural Route 88 (Wonju Detour Road)	Wonju City	Bangokgwanseol-dong	National Route 19, National Route 42 overlap Prefectural Route 88 overlap
Bangok IS	반곡 교차로	Ipchun-ro	Wonju City	Bangokgwanseol-dong	National Route 19, National Route 42 overlap
Bangok Underpass	반곡지하차도		Wonju City	Bangokgwanseol-dong	National Route 19, National Route 42 overlap
Haenggu 1 Bridge	행구1교		Wonju City	Bangokgwanseol-dong	National Route 19, National Route 42 overlap
Haenggu 1 Bridge			Wonju City	Haenggu-dong	National Route 19, National Route 42 overlap
Haenggu IS	행구 교차로	Ungok-ro; Haenggu-ro	Wonju City	Haenggu-dong	National Route 19, National Route 42 overlap
Bongsan 2 Bridge	봉산2교		Wonju City	Bongsan-dong	National Route 19, National Route 42 overlap
Bongsan Tunnel	봉산터널		Wonju City	Bongsan-dong	National Route 19, National Route 42 overlap Approximately 870m
Bongsan Tunnel			Wonju City	Socho-myeon	National Route 19, National Route 42 overlap Approximately 870m
Heungyang IS	흥양 교차로	National Route 42 (Norugogae-gil)	Wonju City	Socho-myeon	National Route 19, National Route 42 overlap
Wonjung Bridge Sinyang Bridge	원중교 신양대교		Wonju City	Socho-myeon	National Route 19 overlap
No name	(이름 없음)	Bukwon-ro	Wonju City	Socho-myeon	National Route 19 overlap
Nammun IS	남문사거리	Seombae-ro	Wonju City	Socho-myeon	National Route 19 overlap
Wonju Airport	원주공항	Dundun-ro; Hoengseong-ro	Wonju City	Socho-myeon	National Route 19 overlap
No name	(이름 없음)	Hoengseong-ro	Hoengseong County	Hoengseong-eup	National Route 19 overlap
Seongnam Elementary School Hoengseong Girls' High School	성남초등학교 횡성여자고등학교		Hoengseong County	Hoengseong-eup	National Route 19 overlap
Ipseok IC	입석 나들목	National Route 6 (Gyeonggang-ro)	Hoengseong County	Hoengseong-eup	National Route 6 overlap National Route 19 overlap
Hoengseong Tunnel	횡성터널		Hoengseong County	Hoengseong-eup	National Route 6 overlap Right tunnel: Approximately 544m Left tunnel: Approximately 540m
Hoengseong IC (Hakgok IC)	횡성 나들목 (학곡 나들목)	Jungang Expressway; Hanu-ro	Hoengseong County	Hoengseong-eup	National Route 6 overlap
Sinchon IC	신촌 나들목	National Route 6 (Gyeonggang-ro)	Hoengseong County	Gonggeun-myeon	National Route 6 overlap
Singok Bridge Hoengseong Agricultural Technology Center Gonggeun Elementary School	신곡교 횡성농업기술센터 공근초등학교		Hoengseong County	Gonggeun-myeon	
Hakdam-ri IS	학담리 교차로	Gonggeunnam-ro; Hakdamsijang-gil	Hoengseong County	Gonggeun-myeon	
Dongmyeon Entrance IS	동면입구 교차로	Prefectural Route 406 (Geumgye-ro)	Hoengseong County	Gonggeun-myeon	
Chodang Bridge Malgurigogae Changbong Bridge	초당교 말구리고개 창봉교		Hoengseong County	Gonggeun-myeon	
Sidong Entrance IS	시동입구 교차로	Prefectural Route 494 (Sidong-ro)	Hoengseong County	Gonggeun-myeon	
Sammachi Tunnel	삼마치터널		Hoengseong County	Gonggeun-myeon	Approximately 780m (Keunsammachijae Elevation 460m)
Sammachi Tunnel			Hongcheon County	Hongcheon-eup	Approximately 780m (Keunsammachijae Elevation 460m)
Sammachi Bridge Sinchon 1 Bridge Sinchon 2 Bridge Jangjeonpyeong 1 Bridge Jangjeonpyeong 2 Overpass	삼마치교 신촌1교 신촌2교 장전평1교 장전평2육교		Hongcheon County	Hongcheon-eup	
Jangjeon Tunnel	장전터널		Hongcheon County	Hongcheon-eup	Right tunnel: Approximately 546m Left tunnel: Approximately 414m
Yeosangok Bridge Haoan Bridge Haoan Overpass	여산곡교 하오안교 하오안육교		Hongcheon County	Hongcheon-eup	
Hongcheon Bridge	홍천대교		Hongcheon County	Hongcheon-eup	
Hongcheon Bridge			Hongcheon County	Bukbang-myeon	
Dunji IS	둔지 교차로	Songhakjeong-ro	Hongcheon County	Bukbang-myeon	
Hwagye IS	화계 교차로	Dodun-gil; Hahwagye-gil	Hongcheon County	Bukbang-myeon	
Hwagye IS	화계삼거리	Hongcheon-ro	Hongcheon County	Bukbang-myeon	
Bukbang IS	북방삼거리	Dugaebisan-ro	Hongcheon County	Bukbang-myeon	
Bukbang-myeon Office Bukbang Bus Stop	북방면사무소 북방버스정류소		Hongcheon County	Bukbang-myeon	
No name	(이름 없음)	Palbongsan-ro	Hongcheon County	Bukbang-myeon	
Busawongogae	부사원고개		Chuncheon City	Dongsan-myeon	Elevation 340m
Dongsan Express Bus Stop	동산직행버스정류소	Joyang-gil	Chuncheon City	Dongsan-myeon	
Joyang IS	조양삼거리	Wonmudong-gil	Chuncheon City	Dongsan-myeon	
Dongsan Middle School	동산중학교		Chuncheon City	Dongsan-myeon	
Joyang IC (Joyang IC IS)	조양 나들목 (조양IC 교차로)	Seoul-Yangyang Expressway	Chuncheon City	Dongsan-myeon	
Joyang IS	조양삼거리	Prefectural Route 86 (Jongjari-ro)	Chuncheon City	Dongsan-myeon	
Chuncheon National Hospital	국립춘천병원		Chuncheon City	Dongsan-myeon	
Wonchang IS	원창삼거리	Saesulmak-gil	Chuncheon City	Dongsan-myeon	
Chuncheon Campus Of Korea Polytechnic III	한국폴리텍III대학 춘천캠퍼스		Chuncheon City	Dongsan-myeon	
Wonchanggogae	원창고개		Chuncheon City	Dongsan-myeon	Elevation 320m
Wonchanggogae			Chuncheon City	Dongnae-myeon	Elevation 320m
No name	(이름 없음)	Wonchanggogae-gil	Chuncheon City	Dongnae-myeon	
Hakgok IS	학곡사거리	National Route 46 (Sunhwan-daero); Yeongseo-ro	Chuncheon City	Dongnae-myeon	National Route 46 overlap
Chuncheon IC	춘천 나들목	Jungang Expressway	Chuncheon City	Dongnae-myeon	National Route 46 overlap
No name	(이름 없음)	Geodu-gil	Chuncheon City	Dongnae-myeon	National Route 46 overlap
Mancheon IS	만천사거리	Geumchon-ro; Hansolmancheon-ro	Chuncheon City	Dong-myeon	National Route 46 overlap
Gangwon Province Human Resources Development Institute	강원도인재개발원		Chuncheon City	Dong-myeon	National Route 46 overlap
Mancheon JCT	만천 분기점	Sunhwan-daero	Chuncheon City	Dong-myeon	National Route 46 overlap
Dongmyeon IC	동면 나들목	National Route 56; Prefectural Route 56 (Garakjae-ro); Chuncheon-ro	Chuncheon City	Dong-myeon	National Route 46, National Route 56 overlap Prefectural Route 56 overlap
Soyang 6 Bridge	소양6교		Chuncheon City	Dong-myeon	National Route 46, National Route 56 overlap Prefectural Route 56 overlap
Cheonjeon IC	천전 나들목	Sinsaembat-ro	Chuncheon City	Sinbuk-eup	National Route 46, National Route 56 overlap Prefectural Route 56 overlap
Sinbuk IS	신북 교차로	National Route 46 (Chunyang-ro)	Chuncheon City	Sinbuk-eup	National Route 46, National Route 56 overlap Prefectural Route 56 overlap
Jinae IS	지내 교차로	Prefectural Route 403 (Jinaegotan-ro)	Chuncheon City	Sinbuk-eup	National Route 56 overlap Prefectural Route 56 overlap
Yongsan IS	용산 교차로	Yeongseo-ro	Chuncheon City	Sinbuk-eup	National Route 56 overlap Prefectural Route 56 overlap
(Gotan Entrance)	(고탄입구)	Prefectural Route 407 (Chunhwa-ro)	Chuncheon City	Sinbuk-eup	National Route 56 overlap Prefectural Route 56 overlap
Chunseong Bridge	춘성교		Chuncheon City	Sinbuk-eup	National Route 56 overlap Prefectural Route 56 overlap
Chunseong Bridge			Chuncheon City	Seo-myeon	National Route 56 overlap Prefectural Route 56 overlap
Chuncheon Dam IS	춘천댐삼거리	Prefectural Route 70 (Seosang-ro)	Chuncheon City	Seo-myeon	National Route 56 overlap Prefectural Route 56 overlap
Galwol Piam Tunnel	갈월피암터널		Chuncheon City	Seo-myeon	National Route 56 overlap Prefectural Route 56 overlap Approximately 80m
Owol 1 Bridge	오월1교		Chuncheon City	Seo-myeon	National Route 56 overlap Prefectural Route 56 overlap
Napsil Piam Tunnel	납실피암터널		Chuncheon City	Seo-myeon	National Route 56 overlap Prefectural Route 56 overlap Approximately 75m
No name	(이름 없음)	Hwaakjiam-gil	Chuncheon City	Seo-myeon	National Route 56 overlap Prefectural Route 56 overlap
Owol Piam Tunnel	오월피암터널		Chuncheon City	Sabuk-myeon	National Route 56 overlap Prefectural Route 56 overlap Approximately 40m
No name	(이름 없음)	Malgogae-gil	Chuncheon City	Sabuk-myeon	National Route 56 overlap Prefectural Route 56 overlap
Malgogae Tunnel	말고개터널		Chuncheon City	Sabuk-myeon	National Route 56 overlap Prefectural Route 56 overlap Approximately 637m
Sinpo Bridge Sabuk-myeon Office	신포교 사북면사무소		Chuncheon City	Sabuk-myeon	National Route 56 overlap Prefectural Route 56 overlap
Jichon IS	지촌삼거리	National Route 56; Prefectural Route 56 (Sanaecheon-ro)	Chuncheon City	Sabuk-myeon	National Route 56 overlap Prefectural Route 56 overlap
Otan Bridge	오탄교		Chuncheon City	Sabuk-myeon	
Otan Bridge			Hwacheon County	Hanam-myeon	
Dalgeorigogae	달거리고개		Hwacheon County	Hanam-myeon	
(Dalgeo-ri)	(달거리)	Gyepa-ro	Hwacheon County	Hanam-myeon	
Woncheon Bridge Hanam-myeon Office	원천교 하남면사무소		Hwacheon County	Hanam-myeon	
Myowon IS	묘원삼거리		Hwacheon County	Hanam-myeon	
Janggeo Bridge	장거교		Hwacheon County	Hanam-myeon	
Nonmi IS	논미삼거리	Nonmi-ro	Hwacheon County	Hanam-myeon	
Bongeoseom IS	붕어섬삼거리	Gangbyeon-ro	Hwacheon County	Hwacheon-eup	
Hwacheon Tunnel	화천터널		Hwacheon County	Hwacheon-eup	Approximately 620m
Sangri IS	상리삼거리	Sangseung-ro	Hwacheon County	Hwacheon-eup	
Sindae IS	신대사거리	Mansandong-ro	Hwacheon County	Sangseo-myeon	
Yumok Bridge	유목교		Hwacheon County	Sangseo-myeon	
Jangchon IS	장촌삼거리	Jangcholli-gil	Hwacheon County	Sangseo-myeon	
Papo IS	파포삼거리	Prefectural Route 461 (Dapa-ro)	Hwacheon County	Sangseo-myeon	Prefectural Route 461 overlap
Papogogae	파포고개		Hwacheon County	Sangseo-myeon	Prefectural Route 461 overlap
Nodong IS	노동삼거리	Prefectural Route 461 (Nosin-ro)	Hwacheon County	Sangseo-myeon	Prefectural Route 461 overlap
Meotdun IS	멋둔삼거리	Meotdun-gil	Hwacheon County	Sangseo-myeon	
Sanyang Intercity Bus Terminal Sanyang Bridge	산양시외버스터미널 산양교		Hwacheon County	Sangseo-myeon	
No name	(이름 없음)	Juparyeong-ro	Hwacheon County	Sangseo-myeon	
Sanyang Elementary School	산양초등학교		Hwacheon County	Sangseo-myeon	
Malgogae	말고개		Hwacheon County	Sangseo-myeon	Elevation 690m
Malgogae			Cheorwon County	Geunnam-myeon	Elevation 690m
Mahyeon 2 Bridge	마현2교		Cheorwon County	Geunnam-myeon	
Yongam IS	용암삼거리	Hoguk-ro	Cheorwon County	Geunnam-myeon	
Yongam 1 Bridge	용암1교		Cheorwon County	Geunnam-myeon	
Yongyang IS	용양삼거리	Haojae-ro	Cheorwon County	Gimhwa-eup	
Amjeong Bridge	암정교		Cheorwon County	Gimhwa-eup	Civilian Control Zone (CCZ)
Eupnae IS	읍내삼거리	National Route 43 (Saengchang-gil)	Cheorwon County	Gimhwa-eup	
Eupnae-ri	읍내리		Cheorwon County	Gimhwa-eup	Civilian Control Zone (CCZ)
Geumgok-ri	금곡리		Cheorwon County	Geunbuk-myeon	Civilian Control Zone (CCZ)
Baekdeok-ri	백덕리		Cheorwon County	Geunbuk-myeon	Civilian Control Zone (CCZ)
Continuation into North Korea
