= National Route 56 (South Korea) =

Road in South Korea

National Route 56
- 국도 제56호선

Route information
- Length: 205.7 km (127.8 mi)
- Existed: 14 March 1981–present

Major junctions
- West end: Cheorwon County, Gangwon Province
- East end: Yangyang County, Gangwon Province

Location
- Country: South Korea

Highway system
- Highway systems of South Korea; Expressways; National; Local

National Route 56 is a national highway in South Korea connects Cheorwon County to Yangyang County. It established on 14 March 1981.

== Main stopovers ==
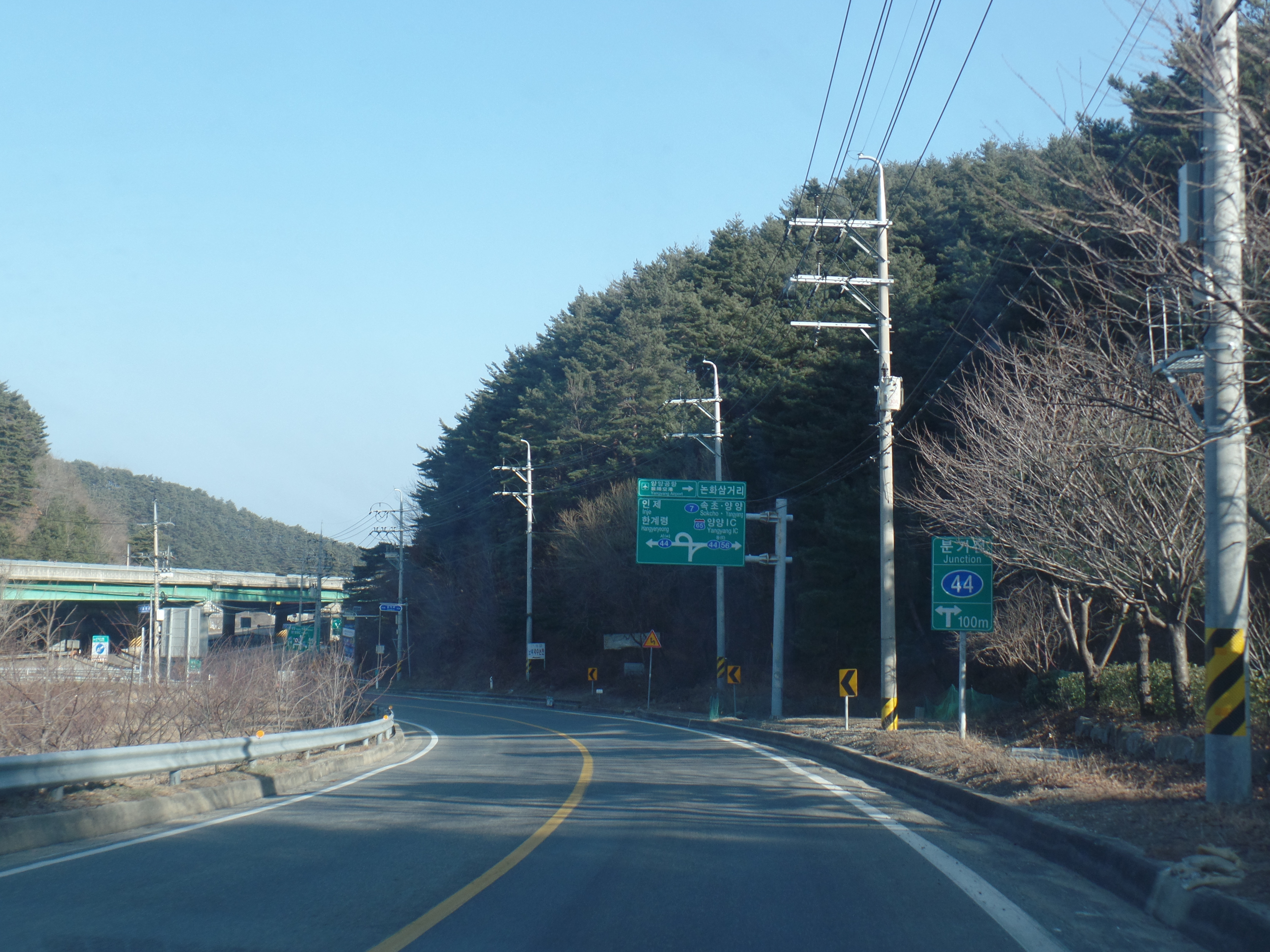
Nonhwa Intersection at Yangyang County.

Gangwon Province

- Cheorwon County - Hwacheon County - Chuncheon - Hongcheon County - Yangyang County

== Major intersections ==
- (■): Motorway

IS: Intersection, IC: Interchange

=== Gangwon Province ===
Name	Hangul name	Connection	Location		Note
Haksa IS	학사 교차로	National Route 43 (Saengchang-gil)	Cheorwon County	Gimhwa-eup	Terminus
Sinbeol IS	신벌 교차로	Sinbeol-ro	Cheorwon County	Seo-myeon	
Sagok IS	사곡 교차로	Geumgang-ro	Cheorwon County	Geunnam-myeon	
Sinsagok IS	신사곡 교차로	National Route 5 (Hoguk-ro)	Cheorwon County	Geunnam-myeon	
Geunnam Elementary School Yukdan-ri Intercity Bus Terminal Geunnam-myeon Office	근남초등학교 육단리시외버스터미널 근남면사무소		Cheorwon County	Geunnam-myeon	
No name	(이름 없음)	Prefectural Route 56 (Haojae-ro)	Cheorwon County	Geunnam-myeon	
Supiryeong	수피령		Cheorwon County	Geunnam-myeon	Elevation 780m
Supiryeong			Hwacheon County	Sangseo-myeon	Elevation 780m
No name	(이름 없음)	Prefectural Route 461 (Dapa-ro)	Hwacheon County	Sangseo-myeon	
Silnae Pass	실내고개		Hwacheon County	Sangseo-myeon	
Silnae Pass			Hwacheon County	Sanae-myeon	
Myeongwol Bridge	명월교	Bakdal-ro	Hwacheon County	Sanae-myeon	
Sachang-ri Public Bus Terminal	사창리공용버스터미널		Hwacheon County	Sanae-myeon	
Changam Bridge	창암교	National Route 75 (Sanae-ro)	Hwacheon County	Sanae-myeon	
Deokgogae	덕고개		Hwacheon County	Sanae-myeon	
Songjeong Bridge (east side)	송정교 동단	Gimsujeung-gil	Hwacheon County	Sanae-myeon	
Sanggu Bridge	상구교		Chuncheon City	Sabuk-myeon	
Jichon IS	지촌삼거리	National Route 5 (Yeongseo-ro)	Chuncheon City	Sabuk-myeon	National Route 5 overlap
Sabuk-myeon Office	사북면사무소		Chuncheon City	Sabuk-myeon	National Route 5 overlap
Malgogae Tunnel	말고개터널		Chuncheon City	Sabuk-myeon	National Route 5 overlap Approximately 637m
No name	(이름 없음)	Malgogae-gil	Chuncheon City	Sabuk-myeon	National Route 5 overlap
Owol Piam Tunnel	오월피암터널		Chuncheon City	Sabuk-myeon	National Route 5 overlap Approximately 40m
No name	(이름 없음)	Hwaakjiam-gil	Chuncheon City	Seo-myeon	National Route 5 overlap
Napsil Piam Tunnel	납실피암터널		Chuncheon City	Seo-myeon	National Route 5 overlap Approximately 75m
Owol 1 Bridge	오월1교		Chuncheon City	Seo-myeon	National Route 5 overlap
Galwol Piam Tunnel	갈월피암터널		Chuncheon City	Seo-myeon	National Route 5 overlap Approximately 80m
Chuncheon Dam IS	춘천댐삼거리	Prefectural Route 70 (Seosang-ro)	Chuncheon City	Seo-myeon	National Route 5 overlap
Chunseong Bridge	춘성교		Chuncheon City	Seo-myeon	National Route 5 overlap
(Gotan Entrance)	(고탄입구)	Prefectural Route 407 (Chunhwa-ro)	Chuncheon City	Sinbuk-eup	National Route 5 overlap
Yongsan IS	용산 교차로	Yeongseo-ro	Chuncheon City	Sinbuk-eup	National Route 5 overlap
Jinae IS	지내 교차로	Prefectural Route 403 (Jinaegotan-ro)	Chuncheon City	Sinbuk-eup	National Route 5 overlap
Sinbuk IS	신북 교차로	National Route 46 (Chunyang-ro)	Chuncheon City	Sinbuk-eup	National Route 5, National Route 46 overlap
Cheonjeon IC	천전 나들목	Sinsaembat-ro	Chuncheon City	Sinbuk-eup	National Route 5, National Route 46 overlap
Soyang 6 Bridge	소양6교		Chuncheon City	Dong-myeon	National Route 5, National Route 46 overlap
Dongmyeon IC	동면 나들목	National Route 5 National Route 46 (Sunhwan-daero)	Chuncheon City	Dong-myeon	National Route 5, National Route 46 overlap
Gamjeong IS	감정삼거리		Chuncheon City	Dong-myeon	
Neuratjae Tunnel	느랏재터널		Chuncheon City	Dong-myeon	Approximately 660m
Garakjae Tunnel	가락재터널		Chuncheon City	Dong-myeon	Approximately 590m
Garakjae Tunnel			Hongcheon County	Hwachon-myeon	Approximately 590m
Yeongsin Elementary School (Closed)	영신초등학교(폐교)		Hongcheon County	Hwachon-myeon	
Guseongpo Clinic	구성포보건진료소		Hongcheon County	Hwachon-myeon	
Anmal Bridge	안말교		Hongcheon County	Hwachon-myeon	
Sinnae IS	신내사거리	Hongcheon-ro	Hongcheon County	Hwachon-myeon	
Guseongpo IS	구성포 교차로	National Route 44 (Seorak-ro)	Hongcheon County	Hwachon-myeon	
Daejin Bridge	대진교		Hongcheon County	Hwachon-myeon	
Hwachon Middle School Sampo Elementary School	화촌중학교 삼포초등학교		Hongcheon County	Hwachon-myeon	
Malgogae	말고개		Hongcheon County	Hwachon-myeon	
Jogateo	조가터	Prefectural Route 406 (Dangmu-ro)	Hongcheon County	Hwachon-myeon	
Sampo Elementary School Gunpyeong Branch School (Closed)	삼포초등학교 군평분교장(폐교)		Hongcheon County	Hwachon-myeon	
Solchijae Tunnel	솔치재터널		Hongcheon County	Hwachon-myeon	Approximately 540m
Solchijae Tunnel			Hongcheon County	Seoseok-myeon	Approximately 540m
Eoron IS	어론삼거리	Prefectural Route 444 (Gongjaksan-ro)	Hongcheon County	Seoseok-myeon	Prefectural Route 444 overlap
No name	(이름 없음)	Prefectural Route 444 (Haengchiryeong-ro)	Hongcheon County	Seoseok-myeon	Prefectural Route 444 overlap
Seoseok-myeon Athletic Park	서석면 체육공원		Hongcheon County	Seoseok-myeon	
Seoseok Intercity Bus Terminal	서석시외버스터미널		Hongcheon County	Seoseok-myeon	
Seoseok Middle School Seoseok High School	서석중학교 서석고등학교		Hongcheon County	Seoseok-myeon	
Pungam Bridge (north side)	풍암교 북단	National Route 19 (Cheongjeong-ro)	Hongcheon County	Seoseok-myeon	
Samsaeng Elementary School	삼생초등학교		Hongcheon County	Seoseok-myeon	
Yuljeon IS Yuljeon Elementary School	율전삼거리 율전초등학교	National Route 31 (Bangnae-ro)	Hongcheon County	Nae-myeon	National Route 31 overlap
Sangbaetjae	상뱃재		Hongcheon County	Nae-myeon	National Route 31 overlap Elevation 886m
Changchon IS	창촌삼거리	National Route 31 (Unduryeong-ro)	Hongcheon County	Nae-myeon	National Route 31 overlap
Naemyeon High School Naemyeon Middle School Changchon Elementary School	내면고등학교 내면중학교 창촌초등학교		Hongcheon County	Nae-myeon	
Changchon Bridge	창촌교		Hongcheon County	Nae-myeon	
Wondang Bridge Wondang Elementary School	원당교 원당초등학교		Hongcheon County	Nae-myeon	
Wondang IS	원당삼거리	Prefectural Route 446 (Naerincheon-ro)	Hongcheon County	Nae-myeon	
Gwangwon Clinic	광원 보건진료소		Hongcheon County	Nae-myeon	
Gwangwon Bridge	광원교		Hongcheon County	Nae-myeon	
Myeonggae IS	명개삼거리	Myeonggae-ro	Hongcheon County	Nae-myeon	
Guryongryeong	구룡령		Hongcheon County	Nae-myeon	Elevation 1013m
Guryongryeong			Yangyang County	Seo-myeon	Elevation 1013m
Galcheon Bridge	갈천교		Yangyang County	Seo-myeon	
Seorim IS	서림삼거리	Prefectural Route 418 (Jochimnyeong-ro)	Yangyang County	Seo-myeon	
Sangpyeong Elementary School Hyeonseo Branch School	상평초등학교 현서분교장		Yangyang County	Seo-myeon	
West Yangyang IC	서양양 나들목	Seoul-Yangyang Expressway	Yangyang County	Seo-myeon	
Yeongdeok IS	영덕사거리	Sanitgol-gil	Yangyang County	Seo-myeon	
Sangpyeong Elementary School Gongsujeon Branch School	상평초등학교 공수전분교장		Yangyang County	Seo-myeon	
Nonhwa IS	논화 교차로	National Route 44 (Seorak-ro)	Yangyang County	Seo-myeon	National Route 44 overlap
Sangpyeong IS	상평 교차로	Gombat-gil	Yangyang County	Seo-myeon	National Route 44 overlap
Yangyang IC	양양 나들목	Seoul-Yangyang Expressway; Donghae Expressway	Yangyang County	Seo-myeon	National Route 44 overlap
Imcheon IS	임천 교차로	Geomacheon-ro; Imcheon-gil; Yangyang-ro	Yangyang County	Yangyang-eup	National Route 44 overlap
Gugyo IS	구교 교차로	Bungmun-gil; Hangogae-gil	Yangyang County	Yangyang-eup	National Route 44 overlap
Cheonggok IS	청곡 교차로	National Route 7 Prefectural Route 56 (Donghae-daero)	Yangyang County	Yangyang-eup	National Route 44 overlap Terminus
