= National Route 28 (South Korea) =

National highway in South Korea

National Route 28
- 국도 제28호선

Route information
- Length: 204.8 km (127.3 mi)
- Existed: 31 August 1971–present

Major junctions
- West end: Yeongju, North Gyeongsang Province
- East end: Pohang, North Gyeongsang Province

Location
- Country: South Korea

Highway system
- Highway systems of South Korea; Expressways; National; Local

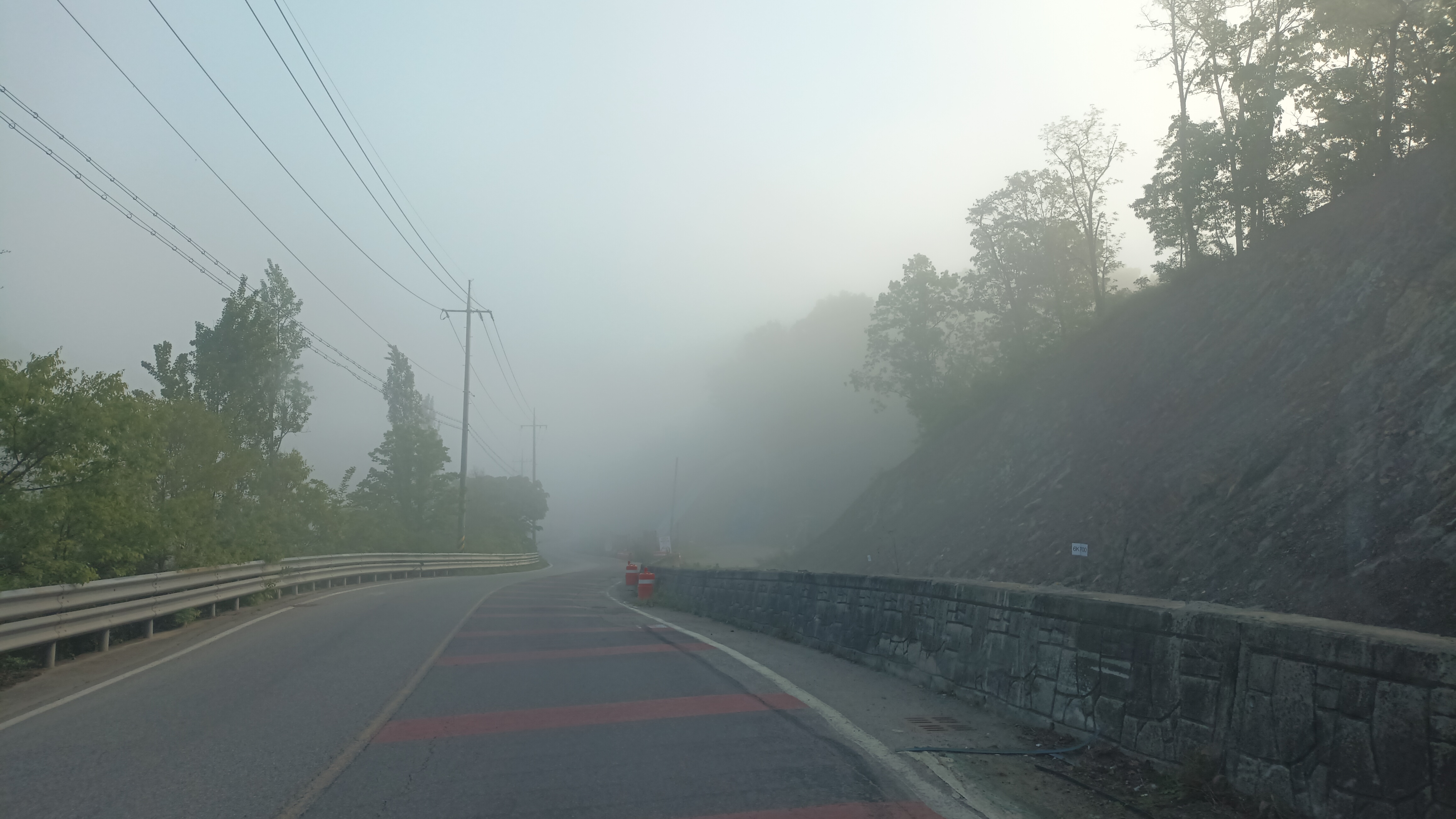

National Route 28 is a national highway in South Korea that connects Yeongju to Pohang. It was established on 31 August 1971.

== History ==
- August 31, 1971: Under the National Highway Route Designation Decree, the road was designated as the Uiseong–Pohang line of National Route 28.
- March 14, 1981: The starting point was extended from Uiseong-eup, Uiseong County, Gyeongsangbuk-do, to Yeongju City, changing the route from the "Uiseong–Pohang Line" to the "Yeongju–Pohang Line."
- May 8, 1981: An 84.9 km section upgraded to a national road — from Yeongju-dong, Yeongju City, to Hajeon-dong, Bongyang-myeon, Uiseong County — opened.
- May 30, 1981: The road zone was changed to include the extended 82 km section under the amendment to Presidential Decree No. 10247, General National Route Designation Decree.
- January 12, 1996: The 3.67 km section of the Uiheung Bypass between Suseo-ri and Eumnae-ri in Uiheung-myeon, Gunwi County, opened.
- June 16, 1997: The 12.7 km section of the Gangdong–Heunghae road between Yugeum-ri, Gangdong-myeon, Gyeongju City, and Seonggok-ri, Heunghae-eup, Pohang Buk-gu, was expanded and opened.
- February 24, 2000: The 10.0 km Yeongju (Munjeong-dong)–Pori (Gamcheon-myeon) section in Gyeongsangbuk-do was designated as a motorway. The 19.0 km Gimhae section (Hanlim-myeon, Toerae-ri–Bulam-dong) was designated as a motorway. The 22.8 km Yeongcheon section (Geumho-eup Gyodae-ri–Gogyeong-myeon Sangdeok-ri) was designated as a motorway.
- July 14, 2000: The 1.2 km section from Gawon-ri to Songho-ri, Dain-myeon, Uiseong County, opened, and the existing 1.1 km section was abolished.
- December 31, 2000: The 800 m section on the Gunwi–Uiseong road (Sechon-ri, Danchon-myeon, Uiseong County) was expanded and opened.
- January 22, 2001: The Daeryeon Intersection (Daeryeon-ri) on the Gangdong–Heunghae road in Heunghae-eup, Pohang Buk-gu was opened as a grade-separated interchange.
- May 10, 2001: The 4.12 km section from Sohwa-ri to Majon-ri, Jibo-myeon, Yecheon County, was widened and opened; the existing 4.1 km section was abolished.
- December 23, 2001: The 1.98 km Uiseong–Geumseong–Cheongro hazardous-road improvement (Cheongro-ri, Geumseong-myeon, Uiseong County) opened, and the existing 1.78 km section was abolished.
- September 19, 2002: The 3.84 km Yeongju–Galsan section (Munjeong-dong, Yeongju City ~ Galsan-ri, Jangsu-myeon) was expanded and opened.
- September 26, 2002: The 13.7 km Gangdong–Heunghae section (Gangdong-myeon, Gyeongju City ~ Seonggok-ri, Heunghae-eup, Pohang Buk-gu) was expanded and opened.
- January 1, 2004: The 3.0 km Gwanho Bridge section at the Gwanho Intersection (Gwanho-ri ~ Murim-ri, Yakmok-myeon, Chilgok County) opened; the Gadong level crossing (Sang-ri, Yechon-eup ~ Geum-ri, Gaepo-myeon) was grade-separated, a 1.34 km section opened, and the existing 840 m section was abolished.
- September 25, 2004: The 3.4 km Yeongju–Gamcheon section (Galsan-ri, Jangsu-myeon, Yeongju City ~ Yuri, Gamcheon-myeon, Yecheon County) was expanded and opened.
- December 28, 2004: The 14.14 km expansion of the Yeongcheon bypass (Geumho–Imgo and Yeongcheon–Gogyeong sections: Daejeon-dong, Yeongcheon City ~ Sangdeok-ri, Gogyeong-myeon) opened.
- June 30, 2005: The 13.2 km Yeongju–Gamcheon section (Gahung-dong, Yeongju City ~ Pori, Gamcheon-myeon, Yecheon County) was expanded and opened, and the existing 13.9 km section was abolished.
- December 30, 2005: The 9.92 km Bian–Bongyang section (Idu-ri, Bian-myeon ~ Hwajeon-ri, Bongyang-myeon, Uiseong County) was expanded and opened; the existing 11.5 km section was abolished.
- September 17, 2009: The 10.6 km Gamcheon–Yecheon section (Pori, Gamcheon-myeon ~ Cheongbok-ri, Yecheon-eup) was designated as a motorway.
- December 23, 2009: The 10.6 km Gamcheon–Yecheon section (Pori, Gamcheon-myeon ~ Cheongbok-ri, Yecheon-eup) was expanded and opened; the existing 13.9 km section (Pori, Gamcheon-myeon ~ Jinae-ri, Yecheon-eup) was abolished.
- December 27, 2011: The 9.5 km Section 1 of the Sinnyeong–Yeongcheon Road (Hwanam-ri, Sinnyeong-myeon, Yeongcheon City ~ Deokam-ri, Hwasan-myeon) was expanded and opened, and the existing section was abolished; the 8.84 km Section 2 (Deokam-ri, Hwasan-myeon ~ Seosandong) was expanded and opened, and the existing 9.1 km section was abolished. The 5.54 km Sinnyeong–Goro road (Hwanam-ri, Sinnyeong-myeon ~ Hwasu-ri, Goro-myeon, Gunwi County) also was expanded and opened, and the existing 6.3 km section was abolished.
- December 21, 2016: The 12.6 km Section 2 of the Dain–Bian Road (Sambun-ri, Dain-myeon ~ Idu-ri, Bian-myeon, Uiseong County) was expanded and opened; the existing 12.4 km section was abolished.
- December 20, 2018: The 10.94 km Section 1 of the Dain–Bian Road (Deokmi-ri ~ Sambun-ri, Dain-myeon, Uiseong County) was expanded and opened; the existing 10.88 km section was abolished.
- March 29, 2021: The 2.0 km Goro–Ubo section (Hwasu-ri, Samgukyusa-myeon, Gunwi County ~ Ihwa-ri, Ubo-myeon) was expanded and opened; the existing 340 m section in Ihwa-ri, Ubo-myeon, Gunwi County was abolished.

== Main stopovers ==
North Gyeongsang Province

- Yeongju – Yecheon County – Uiseong County – Gunwi County – Yeongcheon – Gyeongju – Pohang

== Major intersections ==
- (■): Motorway

IS: Intersection, IC: Interchange

=== North Gyeongsang Province ===
Name	Hangul name	Connection	Location		Note
Yeongju City Waterworks Office	(영주시수도사업부앞)	National Route 36 (Gwangbok-ro)	Yeongju City	Hamang-dong	Terminus; Prefectural Route 935 overlap
No name	(이름 없음)	Yeongju-ro	Yeongju City	Hamang-dong	Terminus; Prefectural Route 935 overlap
Yeongju Market	영주공설시장		Yeongju City	Hamang-dong	Terminus; Prefectural Route 935 overlap
Guseong IS	구성오거리	Prefectural Route 935 (Guseong-ro); Jungang-ro 80beon-gil	Yeongju City	Hamang-dong	Terminus; Prefectural Route 935 overlap
Yeongju Post Office	영주우체국		Yeongju City	Yeongju-dong	
Semuseo IS	세무서사거리	Seonbi-ro; Jungang-ro	Yeongju City	Yeongju-dong	
No name	(이름 없음)	Seonbi-ro	Yeongju City	Hyucheon-dong	
Kkochdongsan Rotary	꽃동산로터리	Kkochdongsan-ro; Daedong-ro; Jicheol-ro; Jicheon-ro 157beon-gil	Yeongju City	Gaheung-dong	
Gaheung Bridge	가흥교		Yeongju City	Gaheung-dong	
Hyundai 2nd Riverside Apartment	현대2차강변아파트	Gaheung-ro; Daedong-ro	Yeongju City	Gaheung-dong	
Yeongju Office of Education	영주교육지원청		Yeongju City	Gaheung-dong	
Rock-carved Buddha Triad and Seated Buddha in Gaheung-dong, Yeongju	가흥동 마애삼존불상		Yeongju City	Gaheung-dong	
No name	(이름 없음)	Daehak-ro	Yeongju City	Gaheung-dong	
Munjeong IS	문정 교차로	National Route 5 (Gyeongbuk-daero)	Yeongju City	Gaheung-dong	
Korea Polytechnic VI College Yeongju Campus	한국폴리텍6대학 영주캠퍼스		Yeongju City	Gaheung-dong	
Dujeon IS	두전 교차로	Jangsu-ro	Yeongju City	Gaheung-dong	
Yeongju IC (Jangsu IS)	영주 나들목 (장수 교차로)	Jungang Expressway; Chunghyo-ro	Yeongju City	Jangsu-myeon	
Yuri IS	유리 교차로	Chunghyo-ro	Yecheon County	Gamcheon-myeon	
Daemaek IS	대맥 교차로	Chunghyo-ro	Yecheon County	Gamcheon-myeon	
Gamcheon IS	감천 교차로	Chunghyo-ro	Yecheon County	Gamcheon-myeon	
Pori IS	포리 교차로	Chunghyo-ro	Yecheon County	Gamcheon-myeon	
Deokyul 1 IS	덕율1 교차로	Chunghyo-ro	Yecheon County	Gamcheon-myeon	
Deokyul 2 IS	덕율2 교차로	Chunghyo-ro	Yecheon County	Gamcheon-myeon	
Galgu IS	갈구 교차로	Chunghyo-ro; Dongmangmireuk-gil	Yecheon County	Yecheon-eup	
Tongmyeong IS	통명 교차로	Prefectural Route 928 (Bomun-ro)	Yecheon County	Yecheon-eup	
East Yecheon IS	동예천 교차로	National Route 34 (Gyeongseo-ro); Prefectural Route 927 (Yanggung-ro)	Yecheon County	Yecheon-eup	National Route 34 overlap
Sindaewang Bridge	신대왕교		Yecheon County	Yecheon-eup	National Route 34 overlap
Jinae Overpass	지내육교	Chunghyo-ro	Yecheon County	Yecheon-eup	National Route 34 overlap
Agricultural Complex IS (Underpass)	농공단지 사거리 (지하차도)	National Route 34 (Gyeongseo-ro)	Yecheon County	Yecheon-eup	National Route 34 overlap
Sangdong Bridge	상동교	Yangchon-gil; Sangdong-gil	Yecheon County	Yecheon-eup	
Jungpyeongcheon Bridge	중평천교		Yecheon County	Yecheon-eup	
Gyeongjin IS	경진삼거리	Prefectural Route 924 (Yonggae-ro)	Yecheon County	Gaepo-myeon	Prefectural Route 924 overlap
Gyeongjin Bridge	경진교		Yecheon County	Gaepo-myeon	Prefectural Route 924 overlap
Gyeongjin Bridge			Yecheon County	Homyeong-myeon	Prefectural Route 924 overlap
Bonpo IS	본포삼거리	Prefectural Route 924 (Homyeong-ro)	Yecheon County	Homyeong-myeon	Prefectural Route 924 overlap
Sohwa IS	소화 교차로	Jibo-ro	Yecheon County	Jibo-myeon	
No name	(이름 없음)	Jibo-ro	Yecheon County	Jibo-myeon	
(Gumajeon)	(구마전)	Prefectural Route 916; Prefectural Route 923 (Jipung-ro); Maechang-gil	Yecheon County	Jibo-myeon	Prefectural Route 916, 923 overlap
Jiin Bridge	지인교		Yecheon County	Jibo-myeon	Prefectural Route 916, 923 overlap
Jiin Bridge			Uiseong County	Dain-myeon	Prefectural Route 916, 923 overlap
Yonggok IS	용곡삼거리	Prefectural Route 916; Prefectural Route 923 (Yonggok-gil)	Uiseong County	Dain-myeon	Prefectural Route 916, 923 overlap
No name	(이름 없음)	Yangseobongjeong-gil	Uiseong County	Dain-myeon	
Deokmi IS	덕미삼거리	National Route 59 (Samgang-ro)	Uiseong County	Dain-myeon	National Route 59 overlap
Seoreung IS	서릉삼거리	National Route 59 (Sangjudain-ro)	Uiseong County	Dain-myeon	National Route 59 overlap
No name	(이름 없음)	Prefectural Route 923 (Danbukdain-ro) (Jami-ro)	Uiseong County	Dain-myeon	
Dain Bus stop	다인정류소		Uiseong County	Dain-myeon	
West Uiseong IC	서의성 나들목	Dangjin-Yeongdeok Expressway	Uiseong County	Danbuk-myeon	
Jeongan IS	정안삼거리	Jeongandeul-gil	Uiseong County	Danbuk-myeon	
Sian IS	시안삼거리	Angye-gil	Uiseong County	Angye-myeon	
Yonggi IS	용기삼거리	Prefectural Route 912 (Doan-ro)	Uiseong County	Angye-myeon	Prefectural Route 912 overlap
Yonggi IS	용기사거리	Prefectural Route 912 (Ansin-ro); Yonggi 3-gil	Uiseong County	Angye-myeon	Prefectural Route 912 overlap
Tomae IS	토매삼거리	Angye-gil	Uiseong County	Angye-myeon	
Yongnam IS	용남사거리	Geobugi-gil; Oenam-gil	Uiseong County	Bian-myeon	
Idu Bridge Bian Bridge	이두교 비안교	Yongcheon-gil; Gangbyeon-gil	Uiseong County	Bian-myeon	
Dongbu Bridge	동부교	Gupomanse-gil	Uiseong County	Bian-myeon	
Jangsong Bridge	장송교	Jangchun 2-gil	Uiseong County	Bian-myeon	
Jangchun Bridge	장춘교		Uiseong County	Bian-myeon	
Ssanggye Bridge	쌍계교	Jangchun-gil	Uiseong County	Bian-myeon	
Doam Bridge	도암교	Doam 1-gil	Uiseong County	Bian-myeon	
Bongyang IS (Bongyang Viaduct)	봉양 교차로 (봉양고가교)	National Route 5 Prefectural Route 68 (Geongbuk-daero); Doriwon 3-gil	Uiseong County	Bongyang-myeon	National Route 5 overlap Prefectural Route 68 overlap
Oncheon IS	온천삼거리	Prefectural Route 927 (Bongho-ro); Doriwon 2-gil	Uiseong County	Bongyang-myeon	National Route 5 overlap Prefectural Route 68, 927 overlap
Uiseong Fire Station	의성소방서		Uiseong County	Bongyang-myeon	National Route 5 overlap Prefectural Route 68, 927 overlap
Gumi IS	구미삼거리	Prefectural Route 927 (Jomun-ro)	Uiseong County	Bongyang-myeon	National Route 5 overlap Prefectural Route 68, 927 overlap
Uiseong County Agricultural Technology Center	의성군 농업기술센터		Uiseong County	Bongyang-myeon	National Route 5 overlap Prefectural Route 68 overlap
Bunto Bridge	분토교		Uiseong County	Bongyang-myeon	National Route 5 overlap Prefectural Route 68 overlap
Bunto Bridge			Uiseong County	Uiseong-eup	National Route 5 overlap Prefectural Route 68 overlap
Yongyeon-ri	용연리	Prefectural Route 68 (Bibong-gil)	Uiseong County	Uiseong-eup	National Route 5 overlap Prefectural Route 68 overlap
Yongyeon Bridge	용연교	Yongyeon 1-gil	Uiseong County	Uiseong-eup	National Route 5 overlap
Wondang IS	원당 교차로	National Route 5 (Gyeongbuk-daero)	Uiseong County	Uiseong-eup	National Route 5 overlap
Palseong Bridge	팔성교	Palseong-gil	Uiseong County	Uiseong-eup	
Oro IS	오로삼거리	Gubong-gil	Uiseong County	Uiseong-eup	
Bibong IS	비봉삼거리	Prefectural Route 68 (Bibong-gil)	Uiseong County	Uiseong-eup	Prefectural Route 68 overlap
Hakmi Bridge	학미교	Prefectural Route 930 (Gongnyong-ro)	Uiseong County	Geumseong-myeon	Prefectural Route 68, 930 overlap
Gyeongdeok Tomb	경덕왕릉		Uiseong County	Geumseong-myeon	Prefectural Route 68, 930 overlap
Daeri IS	대리삼거리	Prefectural Route 927 (Jomun-ro)	Uiseong County	Geumseong-myeon	Prefectural Route 68, 927, 930 overlap
No name	(이름 없음)	Tamni 5-gil	Uiseong County	Geumseong-myeon	Prefectural Route 68, 927, 930 overlap Connect with Tapri Station
Daeri-ri	대리리	Prefectural Route 68 (Geumseonghyeonseo-ro)	Uiseong County	Geumseong-myeon	Prefectural Route 68, 927, 930 overlap
Cheongro Bridge IS	청로교사거리	Prefectural Route 927; Prefectural Route 930 (Gunwigeumseong-ro); Cheongno 3-gil	Uiseong County	Geumseong-myeon	Prefectural Route 927, 930 overlap
Gaeil Overpass	개일육교		Uiseong County	Geumseong-myeon	
No name	(이름 없음)	Seondong-gil; Ihwa-gil	Gunwi County	Ubo-myeon	
Baekyang IS	백양삼거리	Prefectural Route 919 (Hyou-ro)	Gunwi County	Ubo-myeon	
Ubo Station	우보역		Gunwi County	Ubo-myeon	
No name	(이름 없음)	Cheolgil-ro	Gunwi County	Ubo-myeon	
No name	(이름 없음)	Prefectural Route 79 (Sanseonggaeum-ro)	Gunwi County	Uiheung-myeon	
Uiheunghyang Bridge	의흥향교	Eumnae-gil	Gunwi County	Uiheung-myeon	
Hwasu IS	화수삼거리	Prefectural Route 908 (Samgugyusa-ro)	Gunwi County	Goro-myeon	Prefectural Route 908 overlap
Goro IS	고로 교차로		Gunwi County	Goro-myeon	Prefectural Route 908 overlap
Hwasu IS	화수 교차로		Gunwi County	Goro-myeon	Prefectural Route 908 overlap
Gapryeongjae	갑령재		Yeongcheon City	Sinnyeong-myeon	Prefectural Route 908 overlap
Hwaseo IS	화서 교차로	Prefectural Route 908 (Gapti-ro)	Yeongcheon City	Sinnyeong-myeon	Prefectural Route 908 overlap
Gaphyeon IS	갑현 교차로	Jangsu-ro	Yeongcheon City	Sinnyeong-myeon	
Yeonjeong IS	연정 교차로	Sinhwa-ro	Yeongcheon City	Sinnyeong-myeon	
Hyojeong IS	효정 교차로	Sinhwa-ro	Yeongcheon City	Hwasan-myeon	
Danggok IS	당곡 교차로	Nabi-gil	Yeongcheon City	Hwasan-myeon	
Sambu IS	삼부 교차로	Garaesil-ro	Yeongcheon City	Hwasan-myeon	
Seosan IS	서산 교차로	Jangsu-ro	Yeongcheon City	Seobu-dong	
Daejeon IS	대전 교차로	National Route 35 (Yeongcheon City Detour Road)	Yeongcheon City	Seobu-dong	National Route 35 overlap
Nokjeon Bridge	녹전교		Yeongcheon City	Seobu-dong	National Route 35 overlap
Nokjeon Bridge			Yeongcheon City	Jungang-dong	National Route 35 overlap
Omi IS	오미 교차로	National Route 35 (Cheonmun-ro)	Yeongcheon City	Jungang-dong	National Route 35 overlap
Imgo IS	임고 교차로	Prefectural Route 69; Prefectural Route 921 (Poeun-ro)	Yeongcheon City	Imgo-myeon	
Jahocheon Bridge Imgocheon Bridge	자호천교 임고천교		Yeongcheon City	Imgo-myeon	
Yeongcheon Tunnel	영천터널		Yeongcheon City	Imgo-myeon	Approximately 420m
Yeongcheon Tunnel			Yeongcheon City	Gogyeong-myeon	Approximately 420m
Gogyeong IS	고경 교차로	Baegol-gil	Yeongcheon City	Gogyeong-myeon	
Haeseon IS	해선 교차로	Hoguk-ro	Yeongcheon City	Gogyeong-myeon	
Gogyeong Middle School Gogyeong Elementary School	고경중학교 고경초등학교		Yeongcheon City	Gogyeong-myeon	
Cheongjeong IS	청정 교차로	Prefectural Route 904 (Yongdam-ro)	Yeongcheon City	Gogyeong-myeon	
Sitijae	시티재		Yeongcheon City	Gogyeong-myeon	
Sitijae			Gyeongju City	Angang-eup	
Angang Bridge	안강대교		Gyeongju City	Angang-eup	
No name	(이름 없음)	Duryu-gil	Gyeongju City	Angang-eup	
No name	(이름 없음)	Angangjungang-ro	Gyeongju City	Angang-eup	
Angang IC	안강 나들목	Prefectural Route 68 (Anhyeon-ro)	Gyeongju City	Angang-eup	Prefectural Route 68 overlap
Angang IS	안강 교차로	Prefectural Route 68 (Hyeongsan-ro); Angangjungang-ro	Gyeongju City	Angang-eup	Prefectural Route 68 overlap
2nd Gangdong Bridge	제2강동대교		Gyeongju City	Gangdong-myeon	
Yangdong Village	양동마을입구	Yangdongmaeul-gil	Gyeongju City	Gangdong-myeon	
Indong Bridge	인동대교		Gyeongju City	Gangdong-myeon	
Gangdong IC	강동 나들목	National Route 7 (Saneom-ro)	Gyeongju City	Gangdong-myeon	National Route 7 overlap
Yugeum Overpass	유금지하교	Prefectural Route 945 (Cheongang-ro); Gangdong-ro	Gyeongju City	Gangdong-myeon	National Route 7 overlap
Yugeum IC	유금 나들목	National Route 7 (Saneom-ro)	Gyeongju City	Gangdong-myeon	National Route 7 overlap
Uiduk University	위덕대학교		Gyeongju City	Gangdong-myeon	
Chiljeon Bridge	칠전교	Jamyeong-ro	Pohang City	Nam District Yeonil-eup	
Daeryeon IC	대련 나들목	National Route 31 (Saemaeul-ro)	Pohang City	Buk District Heunghae-eup	
Pohang City Agricultural Products Wholesale Market	포항시농산물도매시장		Pohang City	Buk District Heunghae-eup	
Seonggok IC	성곡 나들목	National Route 7 (Donghae-daero); Sotijae-ro	Pohang City	Buk District Heunghae-eup	Terminus
