= National Route 34 (South Korea) =

Road in South Korea

National Route 34
- 국도 제34호선
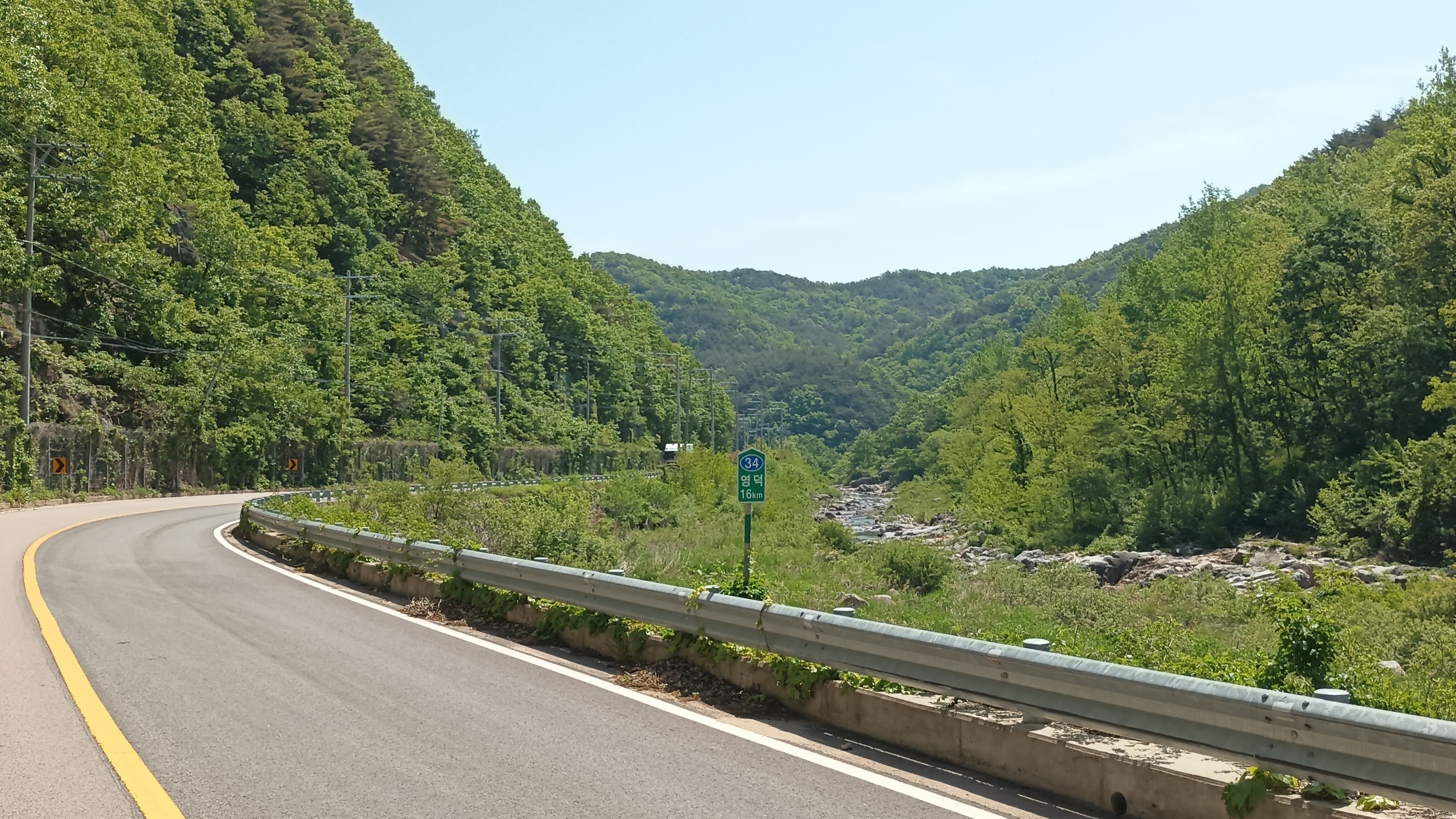

Route information
- Length: 311.5 km (193.6 mi)
- Existed: 31 August 1971–present

Major junctions
- West end: Dangjin, South Chungcheong Province
- East end: Yeongdeok, North Gyeongsang Province

Location
- Country: South Korea

Highway system
- Highway systems of South Korea; Expressways; National; Local

National Route 34 is a national highway in South Korea connects Dangjin to Yeongdeok. It established on 31 August 1971.

== History ==
- August 31, 1971: National Route 34 was designated as the Jeomchon–Yeongdeok Line under the General National Highway Route Designation Decree.
- October 1, 1975: A 410 m section between Mangcheon-ri, Imdong-myeon, Andong County, and Sinan-ri, Jipum-myeon, Yeongdeok County, was opened, while the existing 550 m section was abolished. A 6.26 km section between Bangok-ri, Sanyang-myeon, Mungyeong County, and Gaya-ri, Yonggung-myeon, Yecheon County, was also opened, replacing the existing 5.93 km section.
- March 14, 1981: The starting point was extended from Mungyeong-eup, Mungyeong County, Gyeongsangbuk-do, to Dangjin-eup, Dangjin County, Chungcheongnam-do. The route was consequently changed from the Jeomchon–Yeongdeok Line to the Dangjin–Yeongdeok Line.
- April 16, 1981: A 143.654 km section between Geosan-ri, Sinpyeong-myeon, Dangjin County, Chungcheongnam-do, and Jujin-ri, Yeonpung-myeon, Goesan County, Chungcheongbuk-do, which had been elevated to national highway status, was opened.
- May 30, 1981: The road district was changed to the extended 138 km section following the amendment of the General National Highway Route Designation Decree by Presidential Decree No. 10247.
- May 26, 1986: The existing designated section between Geolmae-ri and Gongse-ri, Inju-myeon, Asan County, was abolished.
- August 29, 1987: An 880 m section in Dunpo-ri, Dunpo-myeon, Asan County, was opened, while the existing 760 m section was abolished.
- November 9, 1987: A 620 m section in Miam-ri, Jeungpyeong-eup, Goesan County, was opened, while the existing 635 m section was abolished.

== National Route 35 ==
- March 14, 1981: National Route 35, the Busan–Gangneung Line, was newly designated.
- April 13, 1981: A 115.4 km section between Dongjeom-ri, Jangseong-eup, Samcheok County, and Seongnae-dong, Gangneung City, which had been elevated to national highway status, was opened.
- May 8, 1981: A 166.6 km section between Wolsan-ri, Naenam-myeon, Wolseong County, and Socheon 1-ri, Beopjeon-myeon, Bonghwa County, which had been elevated to national highway status, was opened.
- May 12, 1981: A 54.932 km section between Gasan-ri, Dong-myeon, Yangsan County, and Bungye-ri, Dudong-myeon, Ulju County, which had been elevated to national highway status, was opened.
- May 30, 1981: The road district was determined as the newly established 319 km section following the amendment of the General National Highway Route Designation Decree by Presidential Decree No. 10247.
- March 11, 1989: The former road sites in the areas of Yongyeon-ri, Habuk-myeon, and Seokgye-ri and Daeseok-ri, Sangbuk-myeon, Yangsan County, were abolished.
- July 15, 1994: A 13 km section between Gwangdong-ri and Tosan-ri, Hajang-myeon, Samcheok County, and a 660 m section between Songgye-ri and Bongsan-ri, Imgye-myeon, Jeongseon County, were opened.
- January 12, 1995: A 13 km section of the Tosan–Imgye road between Tosan-ri, Hajang-myeon, Samcheok County, and Bongsan-ri, Imgye-myeon, Jeongseon County, was opened.
- July 1, 1996: The starting point was changed from Busanjin-gu, Busan Direct-controlled Municipality, to Buk-gu, Busan Metropolitan City.

== National Route 36 ==
- August 31, 1971: National Route 36 was designated as the Daecheon–Uljin Line under the General National Highway Route Designation Decree.
- September 8, 1973: Due to alignment improvements, the road district was changed so that the 365 m section in Bonan-ri, Janggi-myeon, Gongju County, became 460 m, while the 180 m section between Gwangdae-ri and Daechi-ri, Daechi-myeon, Cheongyang County, became 222 m.
- August 8, 1975: A total of 1.11 km between Ansim-ri, Mok-myeon, Cheongyang County, and Eupnae-ri, Cheongyang-myeon, was opened and the existing 1.705 km section was abolished. A 125 m section in Dongdae-ri, Useong-myeon, Gongju County, was also opened and the existing 139 m section was abolished.
- May 13, 1986: The starting point was changed from Daecheon-eup, Daecheon County, Chungcheongnam-do, to Daecheon City, Chungcheongnam-do.
- June 21, 1986: Due to the construction of Chungju Dam, a relocated 7.7 km section between Sinhyeon-ri, Deoksan-myeon, Jewon County, and Susan-ri, Susan-myeon, was opened.

== Main stopovers ==
South Chungcheong Province

- Dangjin - Asan - Seobuk District (Cheonan)

Gyeonggi Province

- Anseong

North Chungcheong Province

- Jincheon County - Jeungpyeong County - Goesan County

North Gyeongsang Province

- Mungyeong - Yecheon County - Andong - Cheongsong County - Yeongdeok County

== Major intersections ==
- (■): Motorway

IS: Intersection, IC: Interchange

=== South Chungcheong Province ===
Name	Hangul name	Connection	Location		Note
Geosan 2 IS	거산2 교차로	National Route 32 (Yedangpyeongya-ro)	Dangjin City	Sinpyeong-myeon	Terminus
Geumcheon Bridge	금천교	Sinpyeong-gil	Dangjin City	Sinpyeong-myeon	
Sinpyeong IS	신평 교차로	Sinpyeong-gil	Dangjin City	Sinpyeong-myeon	
Sinheung IS	신흥 교차로	Sinpyeong-gil	Dangjin City	Sinpyeong-myeon	
Sindang IS	신당 교차로	Saetteo-ro; Wonsindang-ro	Dangjin City	Sinpyeong-myeon	
Unjeong IC	운정 나들목	National Route 38; National Route 77 (Bukbusaneom-ro)	Dangjin City	Sinpyeong-myeon	National Route 38, 77 overlap
Unjeong IS	운정 교차로	Datgeori-gil	Dangjin City	Sinpyeong-myeon	National Route 38, 77 overlap
Sapgyo Bridge	삽교대교		Dangjin City	Sinpyeong-myeon	National Route 38, 77 overlap
Sapgyo IS	삽교 교차로	Sapgyocheon-gil	Dangjin City	Sinpyeong-myeon	National Route 38, 77 overlap
Sapgyocheon Saewall			Dangjin City	Sinpyeong-myeon	National Route 38, 77 overlap
Sapgyocheon Saewall			Asan City	Inju-myeon	National Route 38, 77 overlap
Munbang IS	문방 교차로	Injusandan-ro; Asanman-ro1578beon-gil	Asan City	Inju-myeon	National Route 38, 77 overlap
Inju Industrial Complex IS	인주공단 교차로	Prefectural Route 623 (Injusandan-ro)	Asan City	Inju-myeon	National Route 38, 77 overlap
Mildu IS	밀두 교차로	Hyeondae-ro; Geolmae-gil	Asan City	Inju-myeon	National Route 38, 77 overlap
Inju Elementary School	인주초등학교		Asan City	Inju-myeon	National Route 38, 77 overlap
Gongse IS	공세 교차로	Gongse-gil	Asan City	Inju-myeon	National Route 38, 77 overlap
IC (No name)	입체 교차로 (이름 없음)	National Route 38; National Route 39; National Route 77 (Seohae-ro) (Asan-ro)	Asan City	Inju-myeon	National Route 38, 77 overlap
Sewon IS	세원 교차로	Asanho-ro	Asan City	Inju-myeon	
Baekseokpo IS	백석포사거리	Asanho-ro; Yeongin-ro; Baekseokpo-gil	Asan City	Yeongin-myeon	
Wau IS	와우 교차로	Asanho-ro	Asan City	Yeongin-myeon	
Cheolbong IS	철봉 교차로	Tojeong-ro	Asan City	Yeongin-myeon	
Sinbong IS	신봉 교차로	Sinbong-gil; Asanho-ro840beon-gil	Asan City	Yeongin-myeon	
Sinnam IS	신남 교차로	National Route 43	Asan City	Dunpo-myeon	Under construction
Dunpo IS	둔포 교차로	National Route 45 (Chungmu-ro)	Asan City	Dunpo-myeon	National Route 45 overlap
Seokgeun IS	석근 교차로	National Route 45 (Jangyeongsil-ro)	Asan City	Dunpo-myeon	National Route 45 overlap
Neungan IS	능안 교차로	Asanbaelli-ro; Chungmu-ro	Asan City	Dunpo-myeon	
Unyong IS	운용 교차로	Chungmu-ro	Asan City	Dunpo-myeon	
Wangnim IS	왕림사거리	Sinbang-ro	Cheonan City	Seonghwan-eup (Seobuk District)	
Usin 1 IS	우신1 교차로	Sinbang-ro; Waryong-gil	Cheonan City	Seonghwan-eup (Seobuk District)	
Usin 2 IS	우신2 교차로	National Route 1 (Seonghwan Detour)	Cheonan City	Seonghwan-eup (Seobuk District)	National Route 1 overlap
Maeju IS (Maeju Overpass)	매주 교차로 (매주육교)	Prefectural Route 70 (Yeonamyulgeum-ro)	Cheonan City	Seonghwan-eup (Seobuk District)	National Route 1 overlap
Sangdeokgwaseon Bridge			Cheonan City	Seonghwan-eup (Seobuk District)	National Route 1 overlap
Sangdeokgwaseon Bridge			Cheonan City	Jiksan-eup (Seobuk District)	National Route 1 overlap
Suheol IS	수헐 교차로	National Route 1 (Cheonan-daero)	Cheonan City	Jiksan-eup (Seobuk District)	National Route 1 overlap
Gundong IS	군동 교차로	Jiksan-ro; Jiksanan-gil	Cheonan City	Jiksan-eup (Seobuk District)	
North Cheongan IC (North Cheongan IC IS)	북천안 나들목 (북천안IC 교차로)	Gyeongbu Expressway	Cheonan City	Jiksan-eup (Seobuk District)	
Panjeong IS	판정 교차로	Seongjin-ro	Cheonan City	Jiksan-eup (Seobuk District)	
Yongjeong 1 Bridge Yongjeong 2 Bridge	용정1교 용정2교		Cheonan City	Ipjang-myeon (Seobuk District)	
Yuri IS	유리 교차로	Yeongok-gil	Cheonan City	Ipjang-myeon (Seobuk District)	
Dokjeong IS	독정 교차로	Anseongmatchum-daero; Ipjang-ro	Cheonan City	Ipjang-myeon (Seobuk District)	
Ipjang IS	입장 교차로	Prefectural Route 23 (Manghyang-ro)	Cheonan City	Ipjang-myeon (Seobuk District)	
Dorim IS	도림 교차로	Prefectural Route 57 (Seongjin-ro)	Cheonan City	Ipjang-myeon (Seobuk District)	Prefectural Route 57 overlap
Sanpyeong Bridge (South end)	산평교 남단	Prefectural Route 57 (Seoun-ro)	Cheonan City	Ipjang-myeon (Seobuk District)	Prefectural Route 57 overlap
Yeopjeonchi	엽전치		Cheonan City	Ipjang-myeon (Seobuk District)	Continuation into North Chungcheong Province

=== North Chungcheong Province ===
Name	Hangul name	Connection	Location		Note
Yeopjeonchi	엽전치		Jincheon County	Baekgok-myeon	South Chungcheong Province - North Chungcheong Province border line
Gusu IS	구수삼거리	Prefectural Route 313 (Baeti-ro)	Jincheon County	Baekgok-myeon	Prefectural Route 313 overlap
Baekgok IS	백곡삼거리	Prefectural Route 313 (Munsa-ro)	Jincheon County	Baekgok-myeon	Prefectural Route 313 overlap
Baekgok Middle School (Closed)	백곡중학교 (폐교)		Jincheon County	Baekgok-myeon	
Geonsong Bridge Jincheon Bell Museum Janggwan Bridge	건송교 진천종박물관 장관교		Jincheon County	Jincheon-eup	
Baekgok Reservoir IS	백곡저수지삼거리	Jeonsong-gil	Jincheon County	Jincheon-eup	
Haengjeong IS	행정 교차로	National Route 17 (Saenggeojincheon-ro)	Jincheon County	Jincheon-eup	
Byeokam IS	벽암사거리	National Route 21 (Munhwa-ro); Jungangbuk-ro	Jincheon County	Jincheon-eup	National Route 21 overlap
Seongseok IS	성석사거리	Jungangdong-ro; Jingwang-ro	Jincheon County	Jincheon-eup	National Route 21 overlap
Sinseong IS	신성사거리	National Route 21 (Deokgeum-ro); Wondeok-ro	Jincheon County	Jincheon-eup	National Route 21 overlap
Agricultural Complex Entrance	농공단지입구	Munhwa-ro	Jincheon County	Jincheon-eup	
Seoktan IS	석탄삼거리	Prefectural Route 513	Jincheon County	Chopyeong-myeon	
Ogap Bridge	오갑교		Jincheon County	Chopyeong-myeon	
Ogap IS	오갑삼거리	Chogeum-ro	Jincheon County	Chopyeong-myeon	
Yongjeong IS	용정 교차로	Prefectural Route 516 (Chopyeong-ro)	Jincheon County	Chopyeong-myeon	
Jijeon IS	지전삼거리	Jijeon-gil	Jincheon County	Chopyeong-myeon	
Dongjam Bridge	동잠교		Jincheon County	Chopyeong-myeon	
Sasan IS	사산 교차로	Chopyeong-ro	Jincheon County	Chopyeong-myeon	
Hwasan IS	화산 교차로	Chopyeong-ro	Jincheon County	Chopyeong-myeon	
Chopyeong 1 Tunnel	초평1터널		Jincheon County	Chopyeong-myeon	Right tunnel: Approximately 590m Left tunnel: Approximately 570m
Chopyeong 2 Tunnel	초평2터널		Jincheon County	Chopyeong-myeon	Right tunnel: Approximately 474m Left tunnel: Approximately 429m
Geumseong Bridge	금성교		Jincheon County	Chopyeong-myeon	
Yongjeon IS	용전 교차로	Guseong-ro	Jincheon County	Chopyeong-myeon	
Yonggi IS	용기 교차로	Prefectural Route 510 (Jungbu-ro)	Jincheon County	Chopyeong-myeon	Prefectural Route 510 overlap
Suui IS	수의삼거리	Guseong-ro	Jincheon County	Chopyeong-myeon	Prefectural Route 510 overlap
Yeontan Bridge	연탄교		Jeungpyeong County	Jeungpyeong-eup	Prefectural Route 510 overlap
Yeontan IS	연탄사거리	Prefectural Route 510 (Jungbu-ro)	Jeungpyeong County	Jeungpyeong-eup	Prefectural Route 510 overlap
Bantan Bridge (North end)	반탄교 북단	Insam-ro	Jeungpyeong County	Jeungpyeong-eup	
Bantan Bridge	반탄교		Jeungpyeong County	Jeungpyeong-eup	
Chojung IS	초중사거리	National Route 36 (Chungcheong-daero); Sambo-ro	Jeungpyeong County	Jeungpyeong-eup	National Route 36 overlap
Guncheong IS	군청사거리	Prefectural Route 540 (Gwangjang-ro)	Jeungpyeong County	Jeungpyeong-eup	National Route 36 overlap
Witjangtteul IS	윗장뜰사거리	Jungang-ro; Jeungpyeong-ro; Songsan-ro 4-gil	Jeungpyeong County	Jeungpyeong-eup	National Route 36 overlap
Eastern bypass road IS	동부우회도로삼거리	Dureum-ro	Jeungpyeong County	Jeungpyeong-eup	National Route 36 overlap
Miam Bridge	미암교		Jeungpyeong County	Jeungpyeong-eup	National Route 36 overlap
Hwaseong IS	화성 교차로	National Route 36 (Chungcheong-daero); Jungbu-ro	Jeungpyeong County	Jeungpyeong-eup	National Route 36 overlap
Sagok IS	사곡 교차로	Sagok-ro	Jeungpyeong County	Jeungpyeong-eup	
Cheongnyong Bridge	청룡교		Goesan County	Cheongan-myeon	
Cheongnyong IS	청룡 교차로	Cheonganeumnae-ro	Goesan County	Cheongan-myeon	
Sari IS	사리 교차로	Moraejae-ro	Goesan County	Sari-myeon	
Suam IS	수암 교차로	Moraejae-ro	Goesan County	Sari-myeon	
Sinchon IS	신촌 교차로	Prefectural Route 515 (Igong-ro)	Goesan County	Sari-myeon	
Yupyeong 1 Tunnel			Goesan County	Sari-myeon	
Yupyeong 1 Tunnel			Goesan County	Mungwang-myeon	Approximately 340m
Yupyeong 2 Tunnel	유평2터널		Goesan County	Mungwang-myeon	Approximately 650m
Daemyeong IS	대명 교차로	Eumnae-ro	Goesan County	Mungwang-myeon	
East Jincheon Bridge	동진천교		Goesan County	Goesan-eup	
Seobu IS	서부 교차로	Imkkeokjeong-ro	Goesan County	Goesan-eup	
Goesan IS	괴산 교차로	National Route 37; Prefectural Route 49 (Sanggyeong-ro)	Goesan County	Goesan-eup	National Route 37 overlap Prefectural Route 49 overlap
Dongbu IS	동부 교차로	Munmu-ro	Goesan County	Goesan-eup	National Route 37 overlap Prefectural Route 49 overlap
Dongjin IS	동진 교차로	National Route 19; National Route 37; Prefectural Route 49 (Goegang-ro); Jewol-ro	Goesan County	Goesan-eup	National Route 19, 37 overlap Prefectural Route 49 overlap
Geomseung IS	검승 교차로	National Route 19 (Chungmin-ro)	Goesan County	Goesan-eup	National Route 19 overlap
Chilseong IS	칠성 교차로	Prefectural Route 525 (Maengijae-ro)	Goesan County	Chilseong-myeon	
Gareup IS	갈읍 교차로	Dojeong-ro	Goesan County	Chilseong-myeon	
Jeungjeon IS	증전 교차로	Dojeong-ro; Bido-gil	Goesan County	Chilseong-myeon	
Ssanggok 1 IS	쌍곡1 교차로	Yeonpung-ro	Goesan County	Chilseong-myeon	
Ssanggok 2 IS	쌍곡2 교차로	Prefectural Route 517 (Yeonpung-ro)	Goesan County	Chilseong-myeon	
Jukseok 1 Tunnel			Goesan County	Chilseong-myeon	
Jukseok 1 Tunnel			Goesan County	Yeonpung-myeon	Approximately 1223m
Ipseok IS	입석 교차로	Ipseok-gil	Goesan County	Yeonpung-myeon	
Jukseok 2 Tunnel	적석2터널		Goesan County	Yeonpung-myeon	Approximately 310m
Jukseok IS	적석 교차로	Yeonpung-ro	Goesan County	Yeonpung-myeon	Connection with Jeonpung IC
Jeonpung IC IS	연풍IC 교차로	National Route 3 (Jungwon-daero)	Goesan County	Yeonpung-myeon	National Route 3 overlap
Ihwaryeong Tunnel	이화령터널		Goesan County	Yeonpung-myeon	National Route 3 overlap Approximately 1600m Continuation into North Gyeongsang Province

=== North Gyeongsang Province ===
Name	Hangul name	Connection	Location		Note
Ihwaryeong Tunnel	이화령터널		Mungyeong City	Mungyeong-eup	National Route 3 overlap Approximately 1600m North Chungcheong Province - North Gyeongsang Province border line
Gakseo IS	각서 교차로	Ihwaryeong-ro	Mungyeong City	Mungyeong-eup	National Route 3 overlap
Jinan Overpass	진안육교	Saejae-ro	Mungyeong City	Mungyeong-eup	National Route 3 overlap
Mungyeongsaejae IC (Namho IS)	문경새재 나들목 (남호 교차로)	Jungbu Naeryuk Expressway; Bongmyeong-gil	Mungyeong City	Maseong-myeon	National Route 3 overlap
Mogok IS	모곡 교차로	Prefectural Route 901 (Saejae-ro)	Mungyeong City	Maseong-myeon	National Route 3 overlap
Soya Bridge	소야교		Mungyeong City	Maseong-myeon	National Route 3 overlap
Sinhyeon IS	신현삼거리	Gurang-ro	Mungyeong City	Maseong-myeon	National Route 3 overlap
Jinnam 3 Bridge Jinnam 2 Bridge Jinnam 1 Bridge Buljeong 3 Bridge	진남3교 진남2교 진남1교 불정3교		Mungyeong City	Maseong-myeon	National Route 3 overlap
Buljeong 2 Bridge			Mungyeong City	Jeomchon-dong	National Route 3 overlap
Buljeong 2 Bridge			Mungyeong City	Hogye-myeon	National Route 3 overlap
Geontan IS	건탄사거리	Taebong 1-gil	Mungyeong City	Hogye-myeon	National Route 3 overlap
Buljeong 1 Bridge (North end)	불정1교 북단	National Route 3 (Mungyeong-daero)	Mungyeong City	Hogye-myeon	National Route 3 overlap
Gyeontan IS	견탄 교차로		Mungyeong City	Hogye-myeon	
Byeolam IS	별암삼거리	Singi-ro	Mungyeong City	Hogye-myeon	
Seongbochon Youth Hostels	성보촌		Mungyeong City	Hogye-myeon	
Uro IS	우로삼거리	Makgok-gil	Mungyeong City	Hogye-myeon	
No name	(이름 없음)	Bucheon-ro	Mungyeong City	Hogye-myeon	
Yeonggang Bridge	영강교 동단	Jungang-ro	Mungyeong City	Sanyang-myeon	
Bangokri	(반곡리)	Gyeongseo-ro	Mungyeong City	Sanyang-myeon	
Jinjeong IS	진정사거리	Sanyanggongdan 1-gil Sanyanggongdan 2-gil	Mungyeong City	Sanyang-myeon	
Jinjeong IS	진정삼거리	Prefectural Route 923 (Chusan-ro)	Mungyeong City	Sanyang-myeon	Prefectural Route 923 overlap
Jondo IS	존도삼거리	Prefectural Route 923 (Sannam-ro)	Mungyeong City	Sanyang-myeon	Prefectural Route 923 overlap
Sanyang Bridge	산양교		Mungyeong City	Sanyang-myeon	
Gaya IS	가야 교차로	Prefectural Route 924 (Yonggung-ro)	Yecheon County	Yonggung-myeon	
Santaek IS	산택 교차로	Santaek-gil	Yecheon County	Yonggung-myeon	
Jangsongma-eul	장송마을	Yeseong-ro	Yecheon County	Gaepo-myeon	
Gaepo IS	개포 교차로	Prefectural Route 924 (Yonggae-ro)	Yecheon County	Gaepo-myeon	
Airfield IS (near Yecheon Airport)	비행장 교차로	Maesan-gil	Yecheon County	Yucheon-myeon	
Hwaji Bridge			Yecheon County	Yucheon-myeon	
Hwaji Bridge			Yecheon County	Yecheon-eup	
Agricultural Complex IS (Underpass)	농공단지사거리 (지하차도)	National Route 28 (Yeji-ro)	Yecheon County	Yecheon-eup	National Route 28 overlap
Jinae Overpass	지내육교	Chunghyo-ro	Yecheon County	Yecheon-eup	National Route 28 overlap
Sindaewang Bridge	신대왕교		Yecheon County	Yecheon-eup	National Route 28 overlap
East Yecheon IS	동예천 교차로	National Route 28 (Yeyeong-ro); Prefectural Route 927 (Yanggung-ro)	Yecheon County	Yecheon-eup	National Route 28 overlap Prefectural Route 927 overlap
Gopyeong Bridge			Yecheon County	Yecheon-eup	
Gopyeong Bridge			Yecheon County	Homyeong-myeon	
Jiksan Tunnel	직산터널		Yecheon County	Homyeong-myeon	Right tunnel: Approximately 378m Left tunnel: Approximately 408m
Pungbuk Overpass	풍북육교	Goejeong 2-gil Saneopdanji-gil	Andong City	Pungsan-eup	
Sosan 1 Bridge Sosan 2 Bridge	소산1교 소산2교	Prefectural Route 924 (Pungsantaesa-ro); Saneopdanji-gil	Andong City	Pungsan-eup	
Nori 1 IS	노리1 교차로	Yutongdanji-gil	Andong City	Pungsan-eup	
West Andong IC	서안동 나들목	Jungang Expressway	Andong City	Pungsan-eup	
Nori IS	노리 교차로	Geumdang-gil; Seoseon-gil	Andong City	Pungsan-eup	
Makgok IS	막곡 교차로	Geumdang-gil; Gyoriungok-gil; Seoseon-gil; Hambaegi-gil	Andong City	Pungsan-eup	
Gyori IC	교리 나들목	Gyeongdong-ro	Andong City	Pungsan-eup	
Sugok Bridge	수곡교		Andong City	Pungsan-eup	
Hwagok IS	화곡 교차로	Cheonghoe-gil	Andong City	Pungsan-eup	
Gyepyeong IS	계평 교차로	Prefectural Route 924 (Pungsantaesa-ro)	Andong City	Pungsan-eup	
Nakdonggang Bridge	낙동강교		Andong City	Pungsan-eup	
Nakdonggang Bridge			Andong City	Gangnam-dong	
Namhu Tunnel	남후터널		Andong City	Gangnam-dong	Approximately 386m
Namhu Tunnel			Andong City	Namhu-myeon	Approximately 386m
Namhu IS	남후 교차로	Namil-ro	Andong City	Namhu-myeon	
Suha Tunnel	수하터널		Andong City	Namhu-myeon	Approximately 173m
Suha Tunnel			Andong City	Gangnam-dong	Approximately 173m
Suha Bridge	수하교		Andong City	Gangnam-dong	
Hanti IS	한티 교차로	National Route 5 (Gyeongbuk-daero)	Andong City	Gangnam-dong	
Jeongha 1 Bridge Jeongha 2 Bridge Jeongsang Bridge	정하1교 정하2교 정상교		Andong City	Gangnam-dong	
Jeongsang IS	정상 교차로	National Route 35 (Chunghyo-ro)	Andong City	Gangnam-dong	National Route 35 overlap
Namseon Tunnel			Andong City	Gangnam-dong	National Route 35 overlap Right tunnel: Approximately 400m Left tunnel: Approximately 460m
Namseon Tunnel			Andong City	Namseon-myeon	National Route 35 overlap Right tunnel: Approximately 400m Left tunnel: Approximately 460m
Sinseok 1 Bridge Sinseok 2 Bridge	신석1교 신석2교		Andong City	Namseon-myeon	National Route 35 overlap
Sinseok IS	신석 교차로	Chunghyo-ro	Andong City	Namseon-myeon	National Route 35 overlap
Icheon IS	이천 교차로	National Route 35 (Namsunhwan-ro)	Andong City	Namseon-myeon	National Route 35 overlap
Banbyeoncheon Bridge	반변천교		Andong City	Namseon-myeon	
Banbyeoncheon Bridge			Andong City	Yongsang-dong	
Songcheon IS	송천 교차로	Gyeongdong-ro	Andong City	Yongsang-dong	
Andong National University	안동대학교		Andong City	Yongsang-dong	
Imha Dam	임하댐		Andong City	Imha-myeon	
Ugok IS	우곡삼거리	Mangcheonugok-gil	Andong City	Imdong-myeon	
Mari IS	마리삼거리	Ganeuraeiseol-gil	Andong City	Imdong-myeon	
Bakgok Bridge Daepyeong Bridge Imdong Bridge	박곡교 대평교 임동교		Andong City	Imdong-myeon	
Jungpyeong IS	중평삼거리	Prefectural Route 935 (Imye-ro)	Andong City	Imdong-myeon	
Garaetjae			Andong City	Imdong-myeon	
Garaetjae			Cheongsong County	Jinbo-myeon	
Bugok Bridge Jinbo Bridge Jinbo Hospital	부곡교 진보교 진보병원		Cheongsong County	Jinbo-myeon	
Ichon IS	이촌삼거리	Jinbo-ro	Cheongsong County	Jinbo-myeon	
Jinan IS	진안사거리	National Route 31 (Cheongsong-ro); Jinan-ro	Cheongsong County	Jinbo-myeon	National Route 31 overlap
Gaksan IS	각산삼거리	Jinbo-ro	Cheongsong County	Jinbo-myeon	National Route 31 overlap
Woljeon IS	월전삼거리	National Route 31 (Yeongyang-ro)	Cheongsong County	Jinbo-myeon	National Route 31 overlap
Yeongyang IC	영양 나들목	Dangjin-Yeongdeok Expressway	Cheongsong County	Jinbo-myeon	
Hwangjangjae (Hwangjangjae Rest Area)	황장재 (황장재휴게소)		Cheongsong County	Jinbo-myeon	
Hwangjangjae (Hwangjangjae Rest Area)			Yeongdeok County	Jipum-myeon	
Hwangjang IS	황장삼거리	Prefectural Route 911 (Seokbo-ro)	Yeongdeok County	Jipum-myeon	
Wonjeon Bus stop	원전정류소		Yeongdeok County	Jipum-myeon	
Jipum-myeon Office	지품면사무소	Prefectural Route 69 (Jiyeong-ro)	Yeongdeok County	Jipum-myeon	Prefectural Route 69 overlap
Sinyang River Tunnel	신양강변터널		Yeongdeok County	Jipum-myeon	Prefectural Route 69 overlap Approximately 120m
Sinyang IS	신양삼거리	Prefectural Route 69 (Palgaksan-ro)	Yeongdeok County	Jipum-myeon	Prefectural Route 69 overlap
Yeongdeok Branch Courts (Daegu District Courts) Yeongdeok Supreme Prosecutors' Branch Office (Daegu District Supreme Prosecutors' Office) Yeongdeok County Stadium Yeongdeok Health Center Yeongdeok Fire Department	대구지방법원 영덕지원 대구지방검찰청 영덕지청 영덕군민운동장 영덕군보건소 영덕소방서		Yeongdeok County	Yeongdeok-eup	
Yeongdeok Bus Terminal	영덕버스터미널	Yeongdeok-ro; Guncheong-gil	Yeongdeok County	Yeongdeok-eup	
Deokgok IS	덕곡 교차로	National Route 7 (Donghae-daero)	Yeongdeok County	Yeongdeok-eup	Terminus
