= National Route 33 (South Korea) =

Road in South Korea

National Route 33
- 국도 제33호선

Route information
- Length: 211.3 km (131.3 mi)
- Existed: 14 March 1981–present

Major junctions
- South end: Goseong, South Gyeongsang Province
- North end: Gumi, North Gyeongsang Province

Location
- Country: South Korea

Highway system
- Highway systems of South Korea; Expressways; National; Local

National Route 33 is a national highway in South Korea connects Goseong to Gumi. It was established on 14 March 1981.

== History ==
- March 14, 1981: New construction of ‘’'National Highway Route 33'‘’ Goseong ~ Seonsan Line
- May 8, 1981: Opening of the 92 km section from Hapga-dong, Ssangnim-myeon, Goryeong-gun to Saenggok-dong, Seonsan-eup, Seonsan-gun, upgraded to a national highway
- May 12, 1981: Opening of the 110.745 km section from Songhak-dong, Goseong-eup, Goseong-gun to Wari, Yulgok-myeon, Hapcheon-gun, upgraded to a national highway
- May 30, 1981: Designated as a new 172km section under the amended Presidential Decree No. 10247 on the Designation of General National Highway Routes
- January 12, 1996: 900m section expansion and opening of the road between Yakmok and Gumi City Boundary (Yul-ri, Buksam-myeon, Chilgok-gun ~ Inpyeong-ri)
- July 1, 1996: Terminus changed from ‘Seonsan-eup, Seonsan-gun, Gyeongsangbuk-do’ to ‘Seonsan-eup, Gumi-si, Gyeongsangbuk-do’. Consequently, it became the ‘Goseong ~ Gumi Line’.
- May 8, 1998: Expansion and opening of the 3.2 km section from Gwanho-ri, Yakmok-myeon, Chilgok-gun to Yeongri, Gisan-myeon; existing 2.1 km section abolished
- July 20, 1999: Opening of the 2.04 km section of the Daeyang Bypass Road (Deokjeong-ri, Daeyang-myeon, Hapcheon-gun ~ Daemok-ri), closing the existing 1.72 km section
- September 3, 1999: Opening of the 2.4 km section of the Daeui Bypass Road (Chusan-ri, Daeui-myeon, Uiryeong-gun ~ Masang-ri)
- December 21, 1999: Opening of the 1.74 km section of the Ssangbaek Bypass Road (from Pyeonggu-ri to Hasin-ri, Ssangbaek-myeon, Hapcheon-gun), with the existing 1.02 km section closed
- November 22, 2003: Expansion and opening of the 4.56 km section of the Goseong Bypass Road (from Sinwol-ri to Gyosa-ri, Goseong-eup, Goseong-gun)
- December 31, 2003: Goseong ~ Jaeun-gan Road (Goseong-gun, Goseong-eup, Gyosa-ri ~ Sangri-myeon, Musan-ri) section, 8.47km expansion and opening and abolition of the existing 1.02 km section in Idang-ri, Goseong-eup, Goseong-gun
- January 1, 2004: Opening of the 3.0 km section of Gwanho Bridge (Gwanho-ri, Yakmok-myeon, Chilgok-gun ~ Muri-ri) at Gwanho Intersection; expansion and opening of the 7.8 km section of the Waegwan ~ Gumi Road (Gwanho-ri, Yakmok-myeon, Chilgok-gun ~ Imun-dong, Gumi-si)
- November 19, 2004: Hapcheon Bypass Road, Partial section of Hapcheon ~ Ssangnim Road (Jeongyang-ri, Daeyang-myeon, Hapcheon-gun ~ Yuljin-ri, Yulgok-myeon) 5.5km section expanded and opened, Abolition of the existing 4.1km section from Jeongyang-ri, Daeyang-myeon, Hapcheon-gun to Geumyang-ri, Hapcheon-eup
- December 28, 2004: Expansion and opening of the 8.0km section of the Jaeun ~ Sangri Road (Maseon-ri, Sangri-myeon, Goseong-gun ~ Hakchon-ri, Jeongdong-myeon, Sacheon-si), Abolition of the 270m section in Sinchon-ri, Sangri-myeon, former Goseong-gun
- July 1, 2005: Sanhwa Bridge access ramp section opened
- November 9, 2005: Designated the 9.64 km section from Bonggang-ri, Jiphyeon-myeon, Jinju-si to Pyeonggeo-dong as an expressway
- December 27, 2005: Sacheon Bypass Road (6.21 km section from Pungjeong-ri, Jeongdong-myeon, Sacheon-si to Baechun-ri, Chukdong-myeon) expansion opened to traffic, Abolition of the existing 3.18km section from Pungjeong-ri, Jeongdong-myeon, Sacheon-si to Suseok-ri, Sacheon-eup
- December 19, 2006: Expansion and opening of the 10.2 km section of the Jinju ~ Jipyeon Road (Jangjae-dong, Jinju-si ~ Jeongsu-ri, Jipyeon-myeon), Abolition of the existing 13.2 km section
- December 26, 2006: Expansion and opening of the 5.4 km section of the Hapcheon ~ Ssangnim Road (Wari, Yulgok-myeon, Hapcheon-gun ~ Hapga-ri, Ssangnim-myeon, Goryeong-gun), Abolition of the existing 6.6 km section
- September 21, 2007: Expansion and opening of the 10.98 km section of the Seongju–Whaegwan Road (Sam-san-ri, Seongju-eup, Seongju-gun ~ Yeong-ri, Gisan-myeon, Chilgok-gun), Abolition of Existing Section
- February 4, 2008: Expansion and opening of the 3.74 km section of the Ssangbaek ~ Hapcheon Road (Daemok-ri ~ Jeongyang-ri, Daeyang-myeon, Hapcheon-gun), Abolition of Existing Section
- September 10, 2008: Expansion and opening of the 2.6 km section of the Hapcheon ~ Ssangnim Road (Yuljin-ri, Yulgok-myeon, Hapcheon-gun ~ Wari), Abolition of the existing 2.7 km section
- December 30, 2008: Expansion and opening of the 5.0 km section of the Sangri ~ Sacheon Road (Hakchon-ri ~ Daegok-ri, Jeongdong-myeon, Sacheon-si), Abolition of Existing Sections
- June 9, 2009: Expansion and opening of the 5.8 km section of the Sangri ~ Sacheon Road (Hakchon-ri ~ Pungjeong-ri, Jeongdong-myeon, Sacheon-si), Abolition of the existing 5.68 km section
- September 25, 2009: Expansion and opening of the 2.84 km section of the Hapcheon ~ Ssangnim Road (Hapga-ri ~ Maechon-ri, Ssangnim-myeon, Goryeong-gun), Abolition of the existing 2.9 km section
- December 10, 2009: Expansion and opening of the 4.641 km section of the Seonsan ~ Dogae Road (Gumi-si, Seonsan-eup, Gyori ~ Dogae-myeon, Sillim-ri), Abolition of the existing 2.4 km section
- December 30, 2009: Expansion and opening of the 7.82 km section of the Jiphyun ~ Saengbiryang Road (Jeongsu-ri, Jiphyun-myeon, Jinju-si ~ Gage-ri, Saengbiryang-myeon, Sancheong-gun), Abolition of the existing 8.48 km section
- December 31, 2009: Expansion and opening of the 8.6 km section of the Ssangbaek ~ Hapcheon Road Section 1 (Jangjeon-ri, Ssangbaek-myeon ~ Deokjeong-ri, Daeyang-myeon, Hapcheon-gun), Abolition of Existing Section
- February 29, 2012: Expansion and opening of the 3.4 km section of the Jinju City National Highway Bypass Road between Yugok and Jeongchon (Doksan-ri, Naedong-myeon, Jinju City ~ Hwagae-ri, Jeongchon-myeon)
- June 29, 2012: Expansion and opening of the 3.3 km section of the Jinju City National Highway Bypass Road between Yugok and Jeongchon (Ihyeon-dong, Jinju City ~ Doksan-ri, Naedong-myeon)
- February 10, 2015: Opening of the 8.65 km section expansion of the Jipyeon ~ Yugok section of the Jinju City National Highway Bypass Road (Ihyeon-dong, Jinju City ~ Naengjeong-ri, Jipyeon-myeon)
- September 21, 2015: Expansion and opening of the 7.8 km section of the Saengbiryang ~ Ssangbaekgan Road (from Masang-ri, Daeui-myeon, Uiryeong-gun to Pyeonggu-ri, Ssangbaek-myeon, Hapcheon-gun), with the existing 6.6 km section discontinued
- November 20, 2015: Expansion and opening of the 1.0 km section of the Saengbiryang ~ Ssangbaekgan Road (Masang-ri, Daeui-myeon, Uiryeong-gun ~ Eojeon-ri, Samga-myeon, Hapcheon-gun)
- December 22, 2015: Expansion and opening of the 10.64 km section of the Goryeong ~ Seongju Intercity Road Section 1 (Kwaebin-ri, Goryeong-eup, Goryeong-gun ~ Gyejeong-ri, Suryeon-myeon, Seongju-gun); closure of the existing 140 m section in Wolsan-ri, Unsu-myeon, Goryeong-gun, Abolition of the existing 8.3km section (Kwaebin-ri, Daegaya-eup, Goryeong-gun ~ Gyejeong-ri, Suryeon-myeon)
- March 15, 2016: The existing 16.68 km section within Jinju City (Hwagae-ri, Jeongchon-myeon ~ Naengjeong-ri, Jiphyeon-myeon, Jinju-si) was abolished upon completion of the Jinju City National Highway Bypass Road.
- April 8, 2016: The section within Jinju City was removed and the route was changed to the National Highway Bypass Road section following the opening of the Jinju City National Highway Bypass Road.
- August 9, 2016: The 6.77 km section from Gupo-dong to Gupyeong-dong in Gumi City designated as an automobile-only road, Designated as an expressway for the 7.41 km section from Gupyeong-dong, Gumi-si to Deoksan-ri, Yakmok-myeon, Chilgok-gun, designating the 8.57 km section from Geogido-dong, Gumi-si to Songnim-ri, Goa-eup as an automobile-only road, designating the 11.2 km section from Songnim-ri, Goa-eup, Gumi-si to Wonjeom-ri, Seonsan-eup as an expressway
- November 23, 2016: Temporary opening of a 1.78 km section (Ponam-ri, Seokjeok-eup, Chilgok-gun ~ O-pyeong-ri, Buksam-eup) within the Gumi City National Highway Bypass Road (Gupo ~ Deoksan section) for resident convenience
- December 29, 2016: Expansion and opening of the 21.05 km section of the Goryeong ~ Seongju Intercity Road, Sections 2 and 3 (Gyejeong-ri, Suryeon-myeon, Seongju-gun ~ Daeheung-ri, Seongju-eup), abolishing the existing 6.1 km section from Gyejeong-ri to Sinjeong-ri, Suryeon-myeon, Seongju-gun
- September 28, 2017: Expansion and opening of the 2.2 km section of the Ssangnim ~ Goryeong Road (Annim-ri, Ssangnim-myeon, Goryeong-gun ~ Goari, Daegaya-eup) and the existing 9.0 km section from Gwewon-ri, Ssangnim-myeon, Goryeong-gun to Heonmun-ri, Daegaya-eup will be abolished
- December 27, 2019: Expansion and opening of the 2.2 km section of the Ssangnim ~ Goryeong Road (Annim-ri ~ Gwewon-ri, Ssangnim-myeon, Goryeong-gun)
- January 17, 2020: New 7.41 km section of Gumi City National Highway Bypass Road, Section 2 (Gupo ~ Deoksan) (Gupyeong-dong, Gumi City ~ Deoksan-ri, Yakmok-myeon, Chilgok-gun) opened to traffic
- March 9, 2020: The existing 2.8 km section from the Deoksan Intersection in O-pyeong-ri, Buk-sam-eup, Chilgok-gun to the boundary of O-tae-dong, Gumi-si was abolished due to the opening of the Gumi City National Highway Bypass Road between Gupo and Deoksan.
- March 17, 2020: The total length was reduced from 227.2 km to 211.3 km through a road route change notice
- June 30, 2020: New opening of the 6.95 km section of the Gumi City National Highway Bypass Road, Section 1 (Gupo ~ Deoksan) (Gumi City Geogido ~ Gupyeong-dong).
- June 30, 2021: New opening of the 9.7 km section of the Gumi City National Highway Bypass Road, Section 1 (Gumi City Geogido ~ Goaeup Songnim-ri) between Gupo and Saenggok
- December 17, 2021: New opening of the 11.86 km section of the Gumi City National Highway Bypass Road, Section 2 (Songnim-ri, Goa-eup, Gumi City ~ Imun-ri, Seonsan-eup, Gumi City) between Gupo and Saenggok
- December 29, 2021: The existing 11.7 km section of the Gumi City National Highway Bypass Road between Munseong-ri, Goa-eup and Dongbu-ri, Seonsan-eup was abolished due to the opening of the new Gupo ~ Saenggok section of the bypass road.

== Main stopovers ==
South Gyeongsang Province

- Goseong County - Sacheon - Jinju - Sancheong County - Uiryeong County - Hapcheon County

North Gyeongsang Province

- Goryeong County - Seongju County - Chilgok County - Gumi

== Major intersections ==
- (■): Motorway

IS: Intersection, IC: Interchange

=== South Gyeongsang Province ===
Name	Hangul name	Connection	Location		Note
Sinwol IC	신월 나들목	National Route 14; Prefectural Route 1018 (Namhaean-daero)	Goseong County	Goseong-eup	Terminus
Manlim IC	만림 나들목	Nampo-ro 79beon-gil	Goseong County	Goseong-eup	
No name	(이름 없음)	Songhakgobun-ro	Goseong County	Goseong-eup	
Bupo IS	부포사거리	Prefectural Route 1016 (Bupo-ro)	Goseong County	Sangni-myeon	Prefectural Route 1016 overlap
Cheokjeong IS	척정 교차로	Prefectural Route 1016 (Samsang-ro)	Goseong County	Sangni-myeon	Prefectural Route 1016 overlap
Sangri IS	상리 교차로	Osan 3-gil Cheokbeonjeong 7-gil	Goseong County	Sangni-myeon	
Gobong IS	고봉 교차로	Gobong-ro	Goseong County	Sangni-myeon	
Sogok IS	소곡삼거리	Sogok-gil	Sacheon City	Jeongdong-myeon	
Idong IS	이동삼거리	Soesil-gil	Sacheon City	Jeongdong-myeon	
Hakchon IS	학촌 교차로	Hakchon-gil	Sacheon City	Jeongdong-myeon	
Geonjeom IS	건점 교차로	Geonjeom 1-gil	Sacheon City	Jeongdong-myeon	
Jeongdong IS	정동 교차로	Nocheon-gil	Sacheon City	Jeongdong-myeon	
Daegok IS	대곡 교차로		Sacheon City	Jeongdong-myeon	
Singi IS	신기 교차로	Sucheong-gil; Jangsam-gil	Sacheon City	Jeongdong-myeon	
Pungjeong IS	풍정삼거리		Sacheon City	Jeongdong-myeon	
Pungjeong IS	풍정사거리	Pungjeong-gil	Sacheon City	Jeongdong-myeon	
Pungjeong IS	풍정 교차로	옥산로	Sacheon City	Jeongdong-myeon	
Hwaam Tunnel	화암터널		Sacheon City	Jeongdong-myeon	Approximately 505m
Banggok IS	방곡 교차로	Prefectural Route 30; Prefectural Route 1002 (Guamdumun-ro)	Sacheon City	Sacheon-eup	
Guam IS	구암 교차로	Prefectural Route 1002 (Duryang-ro)	Sacheon City	Sacheon-eup	
Baechun IS	배춘삼거리	National Route 3 (Sacheon-daero)	Sacheon City	Sacheon-eup	National Route 3 overlap
Suseok Bridge			Sacheon City	Sacheon-eup	National Route 3 overlap
Suseok Bridge			Sacheon City	Chukdong-myeon	National Route 3 overlap
No name	(이름 없음)	Prefectural Route 1002 (Seosam-ro)	Sacheon City	Chukdong-myeon	National Route 3 overlap
Ungye IS	운계 교차로	Prefectural Route 1002 (Ungye-gil)	Sacheon City	Chukdong-myeon	National Route 3 overlap Prefectural Route 1002 overlap
Sacheon IC IS	사천IC사거리	Prefectural Route 1002 (Seosam-ro); Gilpyeong-gil	Sacheon City	Chukdong-myeon	National Route 3 overlap Prefectural Route 1002 overlap
Sacheon IC IS	사천IC 교차로	Namhae Expressway	Sacheon City	Chukdong-myeon	National Route 3 overlap
Yeha IS	예하 교차로	Gangju-gil	Jinju City	Jeongchon-myeon	National Route 3 overlap
Yeha 1 Overpass	예하1육교	Daechuk-gil	Jinju City	Jeongchon-myeon	National Route 3 overlap
No name	(이름 없음)	Jeongchon-ro	Jinju City	Jeongchon-myeon	National Route 3 overlap
Hwagae IS	화개 교차로	National Route 2 (Jeongchon Bypass Road); Jinji-daero	Jinju City	Jeongchon-myeon	National Route 2 and National Route 3 overlap
Naedong IS	내동 교차로	National Route 2 (Gyeongseo-daero)	Jinju City	Naedong-myeon	National Route 2 and National Route 3 overlap
Namgang Bridge (South end)	(남강대교 남단)	Manggyeong-ro	Jinju City	Naedong-myeon	National Route 3 overlap
Namgang Bridge (Huimang Bridge)	남강대교 (희망교)		Jinju City	Naedong-myeon	National Route 3 overlap
Namgang Bridge (Huimang Bridge)			Jinju City	Pyeonggeo-dong	National Route 3 overlap
Huimang Bridge IS	희망교 교차로	Namgang-ro	Jinju City	Pyeonggeo-dong	National Route 3 overlap
No name	(이름 없음)	Pyeonggeo-ro; Saepyeonggeo-ro	Jinju City	Pyeonggeo-dong	National Route 3 overlap
10 Square IS	10호광장 교차로	Jinnyangho-ro	Jinju City	Pyeonggeo-dong	National Route 3 overlap
Daesa IS	대사 교차로	Seojang-daero; Sunhwan-ro 676beon-gil	Jinju City	Ihyeon-dong	National Route 3 overlap
Nabulcheon Bridge	나불천교		Jinju City	Ihyeon-dong	National Route 3 overlap
Myeongseok IS	명석 교차로	National Route 3 (Jinju-daero)	Jinju City	Ihyeon-dong	National Route 3 overlap
Hakgan Bridge	각한교		Jinju City	Ihyeon-dong	
Hakgan Bridge			Jinju City	Jiphyeon-myeon	
Gakhan Tunnel	각한터널		Jinju City	Jiphyeon-myeon	Right tunnel: Approximately 348m Left tunnel: Approximately 313m
Sachon 1 Bridge	사촌1교		Jinju City	Jiphyeon-myeon	
Sachon Tunnel	사촌터널		Jinju City	Jiphyeon-myeon	Right tunnel: Approximately 223m Left tunnel: Approximately 248m
Sachon 2 Bridge	사촌2교		Jinju City	Jiphyeon-myeon	
Sachon IS	사촌 교차로	Hanchigol-gil	Jinju City	Jiphyeon-myeon	
Gwandong Bridge Gidong Bridge	관동교 기동교		Jinju City	Jiphyeon-myeon	
Gwanji Tunnel	관지터널		Jinju City	Jiphyeon-myeon	Approximately 246m
Bonggang 1 Bridge Bonggang 2 Bridge	봉강1교 봉강2교		Jinju City	Jiphyeon-myeon	
Jiphyeon IS	집현 교차로	Daesin-ro	Jinju City	Jiphyeon-myeon	
Naengjeong IS	냉정 교차로	Naengjeong-gil 279beon-gil	Jinju City	Jiphyeon-myeon	
Jiphyeon Tunnel	집현터널		Jinju City	Jiphyeon-myeon	Approximately 130m
Daeam IS	대암 교차로	Prefectural Route 1007 (Jinsan-ro)	Jinju City	Jiphyeon-myeon	Prefectural Route 1007 overlap
Naedong IS	내동 교차로	Jinsan-ro; Jinsan-ro 1372beon-gil	Jinju City	Jiphyeon-myeon	Prefectural Route 1007 overlap
Cheolsu IS	철수 교차로	Jinsan-ro; Jinsan-ro 1497beon-gil	Jinju City	Jiphyeon-myeon	Prefectural Route 1007 overlap
Naerigok IS	내리곡 교차로	Jinsan-ro	Jinju City	Jiphyeon-myeon	Prefectural Route 1007 overlap
Angan IS	안간 교차로	Prefectural Route 1007 (Angan-gil)	Jinju City	Micheon-myeon	Prefectural Route 1007 overlap
Jeongchon Tunnel	정촌터널		Jinju City	Micheon-myeon	Approximately 40m
Banghwa IS	방화 교차로	Jinsan-ro; Taebong-ro	Sancheong County	Saengbiryang-myeon	
Sadae IS	사대 교차로	Jinsan-ro	Sancheong County	Saengbiryang-myeon	
Saengbiryang IS	생비량 교차로	National Route 20 (Jirisan-daero); Jirisan-daero 4763beon-gil	Sancheong County	Saengbiryang-myeon	National Route 20 overlap
Songgye Bridge	송계교		Sancheong County	Saengbiryang-myeon	National Route 20 overlap
Daeui IS	대의 교차로	National Route 20 (Uiryeong-daero); Daeui-ro	Uiryeong County	Daeui-myeon	National Route 20 overlap
Sinpyeong IS	신평 교차로	Moui-ro	Hapcheon County	Samga-myeon	
Samga 1 Tunnel	삼가1터널		Hapcheon County	Samga-myeon	Approximately 690m
Samga IS	삼가 교차로	Bongdu-gil	Hapcheon County	Samga-myeon	
Samga 2 Tunnel	삼가2터널		Hapcheon County	Samga-myeon	Approximately 431m
Yangjeon IS	양전 교차로	Prefectural Route 60 (Samga-ro)	Hapcheon County	Samga-myeon	Prefectural Route 60 overlap
No name	(이름 없음)	Prefectural Route 60 (Ssangbaekjungang-ro)	Hapcheon County	Ssangbaek-myeon	Prefectural Route 60 overlap
Ssangbaek Tunnel	쌍백터널		Hapcheon County	Ssangbaek-myeon	Approximately 175m
Ungok IS	운곡 교차로	Ssangbaekjungang-ro	Hapcheon County	Ssangbaek-myeon	
Myeokgok IS	멱곡 교차로	Ssangbaekjungang-ro; Jangjeon 2-gil	Hapcheon County	Ssangbaek-myeon	
Adeung IS	아등 교차로	Ssangbaekjungang-ro	Hapcheon County	Ssangbaek-myeon	
Hamji IS	함지 교차로	Daeya-ro; Dori-gil; Hamji-gil	Hapcheon County	Daeyang-myeon	
Baemidong IS Hapcheon IC	배미동 교차로 합천 나들목	Hamyang-Ulsan Expressway; Daeya-ro	Hapcheon County	Daeyang-myeon	
Hani IS	하니 교차로	Hani-gil	Hapcheon County	Daeyang-myeon	
Jeongyang IS	정양 교차로		Hapcheon County	Daeyang-myeon	
Hapcheon IS	합천 교차로	National Route 24 (Dongbu-ro)	Hapcheon County	Daeyang-myeon	National Route 24 overlap
Hapcheon Bridge	합천대교		Hapcheon County	Daeyang-myeon	National Route 24 overlap
Hapcheon Bridge			Hapcheon County	Hapcheon-eup	National Route 24 overlap
Gyodong IS	교동 교차로	Gangbyeon-ro; Oksan-ro	Hapcheon County	Hapcheon-eup	National Route 24 overlap
Sinsoyang Bridge	신소양교		Hapcheon County	Hapcheon-eup	National Route 24 overlap
Geumyang IS	금양 교차로	National Route 24; Prefectural Route 1034 (Daeya-ro)	Hapcheon County	Hapcheon-eup	National Route 24 overlap Prefectural Route 1034 overlap
Yuljin IS	율진 교차로	Prefectural Route 1034 (Jenae-ro)	Hapcheon County	Yulgok-myeon	Prefectural Route 1034 overlap
Noyang IS	노양 교차로	Prefectural Route 1084 (Noyang-gil); Daeya-ro	Hapcheon County	Yulgok-myeon	
Jiritjae Tunnel	지릿재터널		Hapcheon County	Yulgok-myeon	Approximately 618m Continuation into North Gyeongsang Province

=== North Gyeongsang Province ===
Name	Hangul name	Connection	Location		Note
Jiritjae Tunnel	지릿재터널		Goryeong County	Ssangnim-myeon	Approximately 618m South Gyeongsang Province - North Gyeongsang Province border line
Hapga IS	합가 교차로	Daegaya-ro; Gagok-gil	Goryeong County	Ssangnim-myeon	
Maechon IS	매촌 교차로		Goryeong County	Ssangnim-myeon	
Guiwon Bridge	귀원교		Goryeong County	Ssangnim-myeon	
Guiwon IS	귀원삼거리	National Route 26 (Yeongseo-ro)	Goryeong County	Ssangnim-myeon	National Route 26 overlap
Ssangnim-myeon Office Ssangnim Elementary School Ssangnim Middle School	쌍림면사무소 쌍림초등학교 쌍림중학교		Goryeong County	Ssangnim-myeon	National Route 26 overlap
Anrim IS	안림삼거리	Prefectural Route 907 (Ssangssang-ro)	Goryeong County	Ssangnim-myeon	National Route 26 overlap
Gogok IS	고곡삼거리	Prefectural Route 1036 (Misung-ro)	Goryeong County	Ssangnim-myeon	National Route 26 overlap
No name	(이름 없음)	Sinnam-ro	Goryeong County	Daegaya-eup	National Route 26 overlap
Kaya University Goryeong Campus (Closed)	가야대학교 고령캠퍼스 (폐교)		Goryeong County	Daegaya-eup	National Route 26 overlap
Jisan IS (Daegaya Museum)	지산삼거리 (대가야박물관)	Wangneung-ro	Goryeong County	Daegaya-eup	National Route 26 overlap
Goryeong Square (Goryeong Intercity Bus Terminal)	고령광장 (고령시외버스터미널)	Daegaya-ro; Jungang-ro	Goryeong County	Daegaya-eup	National Route 26 overlap
Janggi IS	장기삼거리	Illyang-ro	Goryeong County	Daegaya-eup	National Route 26 overlap
Heonmun IS	헌문 교차로	Prefectural Route 67; Prefectural Route 79 (Seongsan-ro); Jungang-ro	Goryeong County	Daegaya-eup	National Route 26 overlap Prefectural Route 67, 79 overlap
Goryeong IS	고령 교차로	National Route 26 (Donggoryeong-ro)	Goryeong County	Daegaya-eup	National Route 26 overlap Prefectural Route 67, 79 overlap
Naegokcheon Bridge	내곡천교		Goryeong County	Daegaya-eup	Prefectural Route 67, 79 overlap
Bongwan IS	본관 교차로	Daegaya-ro	Goryeong County	Daegaya-eup	Prefectural Route 67, 79 overlap
Wolsan IS	월산 교차로	Prefectural Route 67; Prefectural Route 79 (Unnyong-ro)	Goryeong County	Unsu-myeon	Prefectural Route 67, 79 overlap
Beopsan Bridge (South end)	법산교 남단	Nameun-gil	Seongju County	Suryun-myeon	
Sinpa Bridge Suryun Middle School	신파교 수륜중학교		Seongju County	Suryun-myeon	
Suryun IS	수륜삼거리	National Route 59 (Seongjugayasan-ro)	Seongju County	Suryun-myeon	National Route 59 overlap
Suryun-myeon Office Suryun Elementary School	수륜면사무소 수륜초등학교		Seongju County	Suryun-myeon	National Route 59 overlap
Yangjeong IS Hoeyeon Seowon	양정삼거리 회연서원	Prefectural Route 913 (Dongganghangang-ro)	Seongju County	Suryun-myeon	National Route 59 overlap
No name	(이름 없음)	National Route 59 (Chambyeol-ro)	Seongju County	Suryun-myeon	National Route 59 overlap
Daeseong Bridge	대성교		Seongju County	Suryun-myeon	
Daeseong Bridge			Seongju County	Daega-myeon	
No name	(이름 없음)	Chambyeol-ro	Seongju County	Daega-myeon	
No name	(이름 없음)	Daegeum-ro	Seongju County	Daega-myeon	
Daega Elementary School	대가초등학교		Seongju County	Daega-myeon	
Daega National Agricultural Cooperative Federation Bank	대가농협	Prefectural Route 913 (Dongganghangang-ro)	Seongju County	Daega-myeon	
Seongju IC (Seongju IC IS)	성주 나들목 (성주IC 교차로)	Jungbu Naeryuk Expressway	Seongju County	Daega-myeon	
Anteo IS	안터 교차로	Chambyeol-ro	Seongju County	Seongju-eup	
Daehwang IS	대황삼거리	National Route 30 (Simsan-ro)	Seongju County	Seongju-eup	National Route 30 overlap
Gyeongsan IS	경산 교차로	Prefectural Route 905 (Sangseong-ro)	Seongju County	Seongju-eup	National Route 30 overlap
Seongju IS	성주 교차로	National Route 30 (Seongju-ro); Seongsan 9-gil	Seongju County	Seongju-eup	National Route 30 overlap
Seongju Underpass	성주지하차도		Seongju County	Seongju-eup	Approximately 385m
Galmak IS	갈막 교차로	Jusan-ro	Seongju County	Seongju-eup	
Haksan 1 Bridge	학산1교		Seongju County	Seongju-eup	
Haksan 1 Bridge			Seongju County	Wolhang-myeon	
Anpo IS	안포 교차로	Jusan-ro	Seongju County	Wolhang-myeon	
Yuwol IS	유월 교차로	Yuwolgongdan-gil	Seongju County	Wolhang-myeon	
Haengjeong IS	행정 교차로	Jusan-ro; Haengjeong 1-gil	Chilgok County	Gisan-myeon	
Jukjeon IS	죽전 교차로	National Route 4 (Chilgok-daero)	Chilgok County	Gisan-myeon	National Route 4 overlap
Chilgok Fire Station	칠곡소방서		Chilgok County	Gisan-myeon	National Route 4 overlap
Gwanho IS (5-way IS)	관호오거리	Jungang-ro; Gwanho 8-gil Gwanho 10-gil	Chilgok County	Yakmok-myeon	National Route 4 overlap
Chilgok Police Station	칠곡경찰서		Chilgok County	Yakmok-myeon	National Route 4 overlap
Gwanho IS	관호 교차로	National Route 4 (Chilgok-daero)	Chilgok County	Yakmok-myeon	National Route 4 overlap
Gyeonghocheon Bridge	경호천교		Chilgok County	Yakmok-myeon	
Deoksan IS	덕산 교차로	Dongdeok-ro	Chilgok County	Buksam-eup	
Imo IS	임오삼거리	Nakdonggangbyeon-ro	Gumi City	Gongdan-dong	Connect with South Gumi IC
South Gumi Bridge	남구미대교 서단	Namgumi-ro; Sanho-daero	Gumi City	Gongdan-dong	
Gumi Bridge	구미대교 서단	Prefectural Route 514 (Suchul-daero)	Gumi City	Gongdan-dong	
Bisan IS (Sanho Bridge)	비산네거리 (산호대교 남단)	Sanho-daero	Gumi City	Bisan-dong	
Sinpyeong Bridge (South end)	신평교 남단	Yaeun-ro; Chilseong-ro	Gumi City	Wonpyeong-dong	
Sinpyeong Bridge	신평교		Gumi City	Wonpyeong-dong	
Sinpyeong Bridge			Gumi City	Jisan-dong	
Wonji Bridge	원지교 북단	Saneom-ro; Yaeun-ro	Gumi City	Jisan-dong	
Jisan-dong Community Center Gumi Public Health Center Geumo Girls' High School	지산동주민센터 구미보건소 금오여자고등학교		Gumi City	Jisan-dong	
Gumi Agricultural and Marine Products Market	구미농수산물시장		Gumi City	Goa-eup	
Songrim IS	송림삼거리	Deulseong-ro; Songpyeong-ro	Gumi City	Goa-eup	
No name	(이름 없음)	Prefectural Route 927 (Songseon-ro)	Gumi City	Goa-eup	
Goa Intercity Bus Terminal Goa-eup Office	고아시외버스정류장 고아읍사무소		Gumi City	Goa-eup	
Oro IS	오로삼거리	Prefectural Route 916 (Poa-ro)	Gumi City	Goa-eup	Prefectural Route 916 overlap
Oro IS	오로사거리	Oro 2-gil	Gumi City	Goa-eup	Prefectural Route 916 overlap
Seonju Bridge	선주교		Gumi City	Goa-eup	Prefectural Route 916 overlap
Seonju Bridge			Gumi City	Seonsan-eup	Prefectural Route 916 overlap
1st Square	1호 광장	National Route 59; Prefectural Route 68; Prefectural Route 916 (Seonsan-daero)	Gumi City	Seonsan-eup	National Route 59 overlap Prefectural Route 68, 916 overlap
Seonsan Terminal	선산터미널		Gumi City	Seonsan-eup	National Route 59 overlap Prefectural Route 68 overlap
Sinae IS	시내 교차로	선산중앙로	Gumi City	Seonsan-eup	National Route 59 overlap Prefectural Route 68 overlap
Gyori IS	교리삼거리	National Route 59 (Seonsangdong-ro)	Gumi City	Seonsan-eup	National Route 59 overlap Prefectural Route 68 overlap
Saenggok IS	생곡 교차로	Yuhak-gil	Gumi City	Seonsan-eup	Prefectural Route 68 overlap
Seonsan Bridge	선산대교		Gumi City	Seonsan-eup	Prefectural Route 68 overlap
Seonsan Bridge			Gumi City	Dogae-myeon	Prefectural Route 68 overlap
Dogae IS	도개 교차로	National Route 25 (Nakdong-daero); Prefectural Route 68 (Seonsan-daero)	Gumi City	Dogae-myeon	Terminus; Prefectural Route 68 overlap
Prefectural Route 68 overlap
