= National Route 20 (South Korea) =

National highway in South Korea

National Route 20
- 국도 제20호선

Route information
- Length: 230.2 km (143.0 mi)
- Existed: 14 March 1981–present

Major junctions
- West end: Sancheong County, South Gyeongsang Province
- East end: Pohang, North Gyeongsang Province

Location
- Country: South Korea

Highway system
- Highway systems of South Korea; Expressways; National; Local

National Route 20 is a national highway in South Korea connects Sancheong to Pohang. It was established on 14 March 1981.

== History ==
- March 14, 1981: National Route 20 Sicheon ~ Gyeongju Line newly established
- May 8, 1981: Geumgok-dong, Punggak-myeon, Cheongdo-gun ~ Geoncheon-ri, Geoncheon-eup, Wolseong-gun 79.7 km section upgraded to national highway opened
- May 12, 1981: Jungsan-ri, Sicheon-myeon, Sancheong-gun ~ Bang-ri, Seongsan-myeon, Changnyeong-gun 136.473 km section upgraded to national highway opened
- May 30, 1981: Road zone determined for newly established 186 km section according to the amendment of Presidential Decree No. 10247 General National Highway Route Designation Decree
- March 11, 1989: Old road sites in Seongsori, Bonchori, Youeo-myeon, Changnyeong-gun area abolished
- July 1, 1996: End point extended from 'Gyeongju-si, Gyeongsangbuk-do' to 'Pohang-si, Gyeongsangbuk-do'. Accordingly became 'Sancheong ~ Pohang Line'.
- May 23, 1998: Songgye Bridge (Gagye-ri, Saengbiryang-myeon, Sancheong-gun) 1.5 km section newly opened, existing 850m section abolished
- June 10, 1999: Chilgok Bypass Road (Dosan-ri ~ Sinpo-ri, Chilgok-myeon, Uiryeong-gun) 1 km section opened, existing section abolished
- July 19, 1999: Cheongdo Bridge (Beomgok-ri, Hwayang-eup ~ Wonjeong-ri, Cheongdo-eup, Cheongdo-gun) 3.22 km section opened, existing 7 km section abolished
- September 3, 1999: Daeui Bypass Road (Chusan-ri ~ Massang-ri, Daeui-myeon, Uiryeong-gun) 2.37 km section opened
- December 30, 1999: Saengbiryang Bypass Road (Oedo-ri ~ Dodong-ri, Saengbiryang-myeon, Sancheong-gun) 1.387 km section opened, existing 730m section abolished
- December 1999: Geoncheon Western Bypass Road 2.8 km section opened among Geoncheon ~ Pohang Road
- February 24, 2000: Cheonpo-ri, Geoncheon-eup, Gyeongju-si, Gyeongsangbuk-do ~ Jangheung-dong, Nam-gu, Pohang-si 32.9 km section designated as automobile-only road
- August 18, 2000: Burim Bypass Road (Seganri, Yugok-myeon ~ Gamam-ri, Burim-myeon, Uiryeong-gun) 4.29 km section opened, existing 2.6 km section abolished
- October 13, 2001: Danseong Bypass Road (Sawol-ri ~ Gangnu-ri, Danseong-myeon, Sancheong-gun) 4.637 km section opened, existing 4.2 km section abolished
- September 13, 2002: Sicheon Bypass Road (Won-ri ~ Sa-ri, Sicheon-myeon, Sancheong-gun) 3.56 km section expansion opening, existing Oegong-ri ~ Sa-ri, Sicheon-myeon, Sancheong-gun 3.7 km section abolished
- January 1, 2003: Punggak Bypass Road (Heukseok-ri, Punggak-myeon ~ Sindang-ri, Gangnam-myeon, Cheongdo-gun) 4.17 km section opened
- May 16, 2003: Cheonbuk ~ Pohang section among Geoncheon ~ Pohang Road (Sabang-ri, Angang-eup ~ Wangsin-ri, Gangdong-myeon, Gyeongju-si) 6.7 km section expansion opening
- December 4, 2003: Geumcheon Bypass Road (Donggok-ri, Geumcheon-myeon ~ Bangji-ri, Unmun-myeon, Cheongdo-gun) 4.4 km section opened
- September 24, 2004: Hwayang ~ Cheongdo Road (Seosang-ri ~ Beomgok-ri, Hwayang-eup, Cheongdo-gun) 2.52 km section expansion opening, existing 1 km section abolished
- December 29, 2004: With the opening of Gangdong ~ Pohang section 9.2 km, Geoncheon IC ~ Hyeongok 6.0 km section, Hyeongok ~ Cheonbuk 8.0 km section among Geoncheon ~ Pohang Road, entire Geoncheon ~ Pohang Road (Cheonpo-ri, Geoncheon-eup, Gyeongju-si ~ Jenae-ri, Daesong-myeon, Nam-gu, Pohang-si) 33.1 km section opened
- July 20, 2006: Geumgok-ri, Punggak-myeon, Cheongdo-gun 600m section alignment improvement opening, existing 420m section abolished
- June 19, 2008: Due to Geoncheon Western Bypass Road opening, existing Cheonpo-ri ~ Jojeon-ri, Geoncheon-eup, Gyeongju-si 1.3 km section abolished
- September 13, 2010: Chilgok ~ Garye Road (Sinpo-ri, Chilgok-myeon ~ Garye-ri, Garye-myeon, Uiryeong-gun) 4.33 km section expansion opening
- January 1, 2011: Due to Chilgok ~ Garye Road opening, existing Sinpo-ri, Chilgok-myeon ~ Garye-ri, Garye-myeon, Uiryeong-gun 3.0 km section abolished
- June 30, 2013: Namcheon ~ Cheongdo Road Section 1 and Gomtijae Tunnel (Buya-ri, Cheongdo-eup ~ Deoksan-ri, Maejeon-myeon, Cheongdo-gun) 4.88 km section expansion opening
- August 29, 2013: Due to Namcheon ~ Cheongdo Road Section 1 and Gomtijae Tunnel opening, existing Buya-ri, Cheongdo-eup ~ Deoksan-ri, Maejeon-myeon, Cheongdo-gun 4.76 km section abolished
- December 1, 2014: Daeui ~ Chilgok Road (Daeui Intersection, Massang-ri, Daeui-myeon ~ Chilgok Intersection, Oejo-ri, Chilgok-myeon, Uiryeong-gun) 8.256 km section expansion opening, existing Dasa-ri, Daeui-myeon ~ Sanbuk-ri, Chilgok-myeon, Uiryeong-gun 4.63 km section abolished
- December 19, 2014: Punggak ~ Hwayang Road (Sindang Intersection, Sindang-ri, Gangnam-myeon ~ Hapcheon Three-way Intersection, Seosan-ri, Hwayang-eup, Cheongdo-gun) 6.5 km section expansion opening, existing Sindang-ri ~ Chilseong-ri, Gangnam-myeon, Cheongdo-gun 4.2 km section abolished
- December 29, 2014: Saengbiryang ~ Ssangbaek Road (Dori ~ Gagye-ri, Saengbiryang-myeon, Sancheong-gun) 3.4 km section expansion opening, existing section abolished
- March 27, 2015: Starting point changed from Won-ri Intersection, Sicheon-myeon, Sancheong-gun to Jungsan-ri, Sicheon-myeon
- January 16, 2017: Boncho-ri, Daeji-myeon, Changnyeong-gun 440m section improvement opening, existing 500m section abolished
- July 31, 2017: Uiryeong ~ Jeonggok Road (Ungok-ri, Yongdeok-myeon ~ Jukjeon-ri, Jeonggok-myeon, Uiryeong-gun) 4.7 km section improvement opening, existing 3.9 km section abolished
- December 21, 2021: Jukjeon District dangerous road (Jukjeon-ri, Jeonggok-myeon, Uiryeong-gun) 200m section improvement opening, existing section abolished

== Main stopovers ==
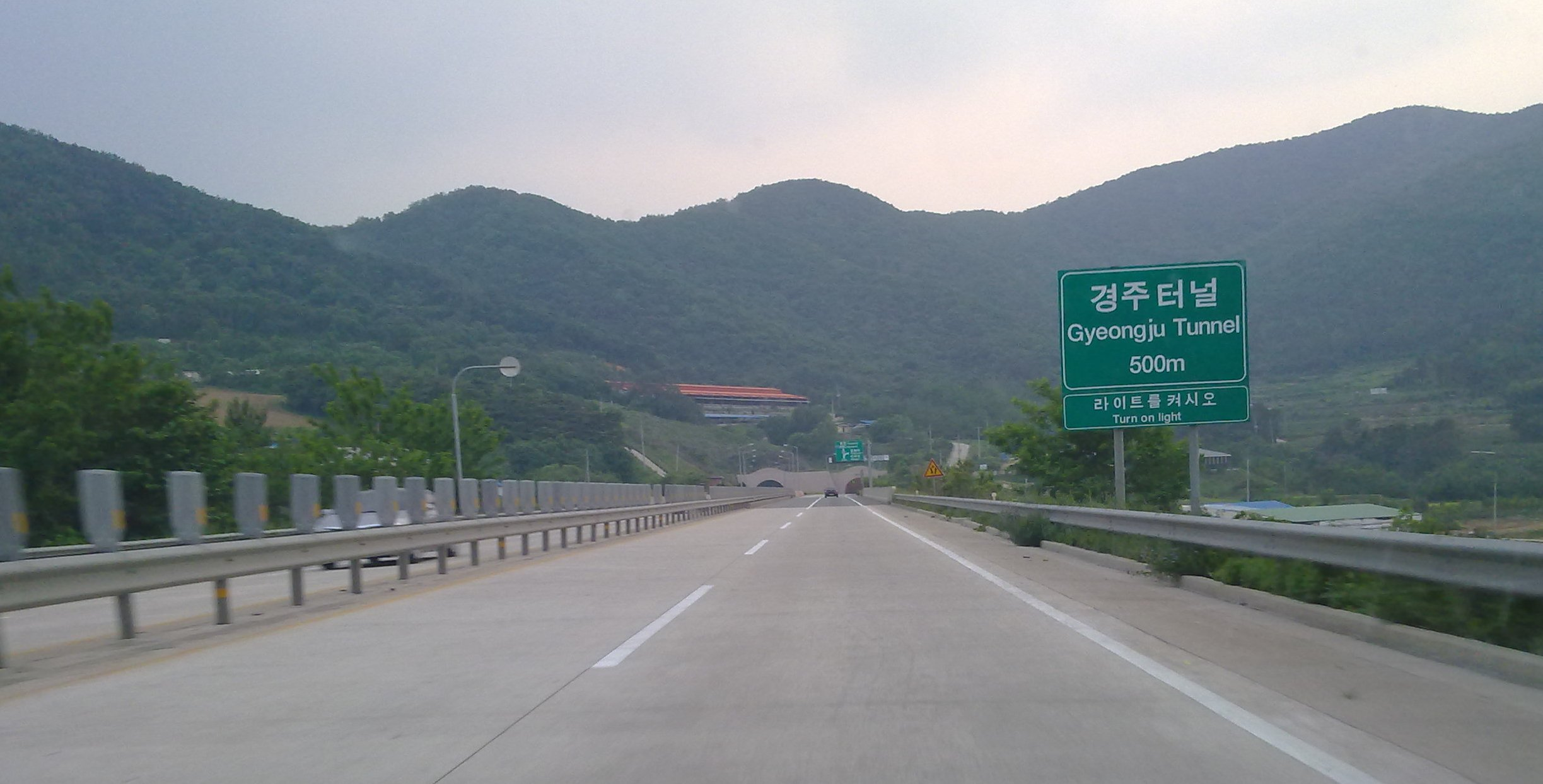
Gyeongju Tunnel

South Gyeongsang Province

- Sancheong County - Uiryeong County - Hapcheon County - Changnyeong County

North Gyeongsang Province

- Cheongdo County - Gyeongju - Pohang

== Major intersections ==
- (■): Motorway

IS: Intersection, IC: Interchange

=== South Gyeongsang Province ===
Name	Hangul name	Connection	Location		Note
Jungsan-ri	중산리		Sancheong County	Sicheon-myeon	Terminus
Jungsan Bridge	중산교		Sancheong County	Sicheon-myeon	
(Samdang Bridge)	(삼당교 동단)	Prefectural Route 1047 (Samsinbong-ro)	Sancheong County	Sicheon-myeon	Prefectural Route 1047 overlap
Sincheon Elementary School	신천초등학교		Sancheong County	Sicheon-myeon	Prefectural Route 1047 overlap
(Oegongma-eul)	(외공마을)	National Route 59	Sancheong County	Sicheon-myeon	Prefectural Route 1047 overlap National Route 59 overlap
Wonri IS	원리 교차로	National Route 59 (Jirisan-daero)	Sancheong County	Sicheon-myeon	National Route 59 overlap
No name	(이름 없음)	Chinhwangyeong-ro	Sancheong County	Sicheon-myeon	
Sari IS	사리 교차로	Nammyeong-ro	Sancheong County	Sicheon-myeon	
Changchon IS	창촌삼거리	Prefectural Route 1005 (Okdan-ro)	Sancheong County	Danseong-myeon	
(Hoam Bridge)	(호암교 남단)	Prefectural Route 1001 (Hoam-ro)	Sancheong County	Danseong-myeon	Prefectural Route 1001 overlap
Namsa IS	남사삼거리	Prefectural Route 1001 (Mokhwa-ro)	Sancheong County	Danseong-myeon	Prefectural Route 1001 overlap
No name	(이름 없음)	Prefectural Route 1049 (Mokhwa-ro)	Sancheong County	Danseong-myeon	
Baeyang Bridge	배양교	Prefectural Route 1049 (Mokhwa-ro) (Seongcheol-ro)	Sancheong County	Danseong-myeon	
Danseong IC	단성 나들목	Tongyeong–Daejeon Expressway; Mokhwa-ro	Sancheong County	Danseong-myeon	
Danseong High School IS	단성중고교앞사거리	Gangnubangmok-ro; Jirisan-daero 3362beon-gil	Sancheong County	Danseong-myeon	
Danseong Bridge	단성교		Sancheong County	Danseong-myeon	
Danseong Bridge			Sancheong County	Sinan-myeon	
Wonji IS	원지삼거리	Jungchongalcheon-ro	Sancheong County	Sinan-myeon	
No name	(이름 없음)	Wonji-ro	Sancheong County	Sinan-myeon	
Hajeong IS	하정 교차로	National Route 3 (Sancheong-daero)	Sancheong County	Sinan-myeon	
(Cheonghyeon Bridge)	(청현교 북단)	Prefectural Route 1006 (Cheonghyeon-ro)	Sancheong County	Sinan-myeon	Prefectural Route 1006 overlap
Mundae Clinic	문대보건진료소		Sancheong County	Sinan-myeon	Prefectural Route 1006 overlap
Mundae IS	문대삼거리	Prefectural Route 1006 (Sincha-ro)	Sancheong County	Sinan-myeon	Prefectural Route 1006 overlap
Sinan Bridge	신안교		Sancheong County	Sinan-myeon	
Dori IS	도리 교차로	Biryang-ro	Sancheong County	Saengbiryang-myeon	
Saengbiryang IS	생비량삼거리	Jinsan-ro	Sancheong County	Saengbiryang-myeon	
Saengbiryang IS	생비량 교차로	National Route 33 (Daesin-ro)	Sancheong County	Saengbiryang-myeon	National Route 33 overlap
Songgye Bridge	송계교		Sancheong County	Saengbiryang-myeon	National Route 33 overlap
Daeui IS	대의 교차로	National Route 33 (Hapcheon-daero)	Uiryeong County	Daeui-myeon	National Route 33 overlap
Massang IS	마쌍 교차로	Daeui-ro	Uiryeong County	Daeui-myeon	
No nane	(이름 없음)	Daeui-ro	Uiryeong County	Daeui-myeon	
Pyeongchon IS	평촌 교차로	Missang 2-gil	Uiryeong County	Daeui-myeon	
Jukjeon IS	죽전 교차로	Hanti-ro	Uiryeong County	Daeui-myeon	
Dasa IS	다사 교차로	Hanti-ro	Uiryeong County	Daeui-myeon	
Dasa Tunnel	다사터널		Uiryeong County	Daeui-myeon	Approximately 660m
Dasa Tunnel			Uiryeong County	Chilgok-myeon	Approximately 660m
Yangchon IS	양촌 교차로	Hanti-ro	Uiryeong County	Chilgok-myeon	
Sannam IS	산남 교차로	Hanti-ro	Uiryeong County	Chilgok-myeon	
Chilgok IS	칠곡 교차로	Chilgok-ro	Uiryeong County	Chilgok-myeon	
Ibam IS	입암 교차로	Prefectural Route 1013 (Chilgok-ro) (Jinui-ro)	Uiryeong County	Chilgok-myeon	
Bongdu IS	봉두 교차로	Hongui-ro	Uiryeong County	Garye-myeon	
Unam Overpass	운암육교		Uiryeong County	Garye-myeon	
Garye Overpass	가례육교	Hongui-ro	Uiryeong County	Garye-myeon	
Garye IS	가례 교차로	Uibyeong-ro	Uiryeong County	Garye-myeon	
Namcheon IS	남천삼거리	Prefectural Route 1037 (Byeokhwa-ro)	Uiryeong County	Uiryeong-eup	Prefectural Route 1037 overlap
Seobu IS	서부삼거리	Prefectural Route 1037 (Uibyeong-ro 8-gil)	Uiryeong County	Uiryeong-eup	Prefectural Route 1037 overlap
Uibyeong IS	의병사거리	Chungik-ro	Uiryeong County	Uiryeong-eup	
Guryong IS	구룡사거리	Guryong-ro; Namsan-ro	Uiryeong County	Uiryeong-eup	
Baekya IS	백야오거리	National Route 79 (Uiryeong-daero); Namgang-ro; Baeksan-ro	Uiryeong County	Uiryeong-eup	
Mujeon IS	무전삼거리	Baeksan-ro	Uiryeong County	Uiryeong-eup	
Gyoam IS	교암사거리	Deokam-ro; Sosang-ro	Uiryeong County	Yongdeok-myeon	
No name	(이름 없음)	Yongam-ro	Uiryeong County	Yongdeok-myeon	
Jindeungjae	진등재		Uiryeong County	Yongdeok-myeon	
Jindeungjae			Uiryeong County	Jeonggok-myeon	
Jukjeon-ri	죽전리	Prefectural Route 1029	Uiryeong County	Jeonggok-myeon	Under construction
Jeonggok IS	정곡삼거리	Beopjeong-ro	Uiryeong County	Jeonggok-myeon	
Junggyo IS	중교사거리	Prefectural Route 1011 (Beopjeong-ro)	Uiryeong County	Jeonggok-myeon	
Jeonggok Middle School	정곡중학교		Uiryeong County	Jeonggok-myeon	
Yasan IS	야산삼거리	Prefectural Route 1041 (Cheongjeong-ro)	Uiryeong County	Yugok-myeon	Prefectural Route 1041 overlap
Segan IS	세간삼거리	Prefectural Route 1041 (Hamui-ro)	Uiryeong County	Yugok-myeon	Prefectural Route 1041 overlap
Segan Bridge IS	세간교삼거리	Prefectural Route 60; Prefectural Route 1008 (Bakjin-ro)	Uiryeong County	Yugok-myeon	Prefectural Route 60 overlap
No name	(이름 없음)	Danwon-ro; Sinbeon-ro	Uiryeong County	Burim-myeon	Prefectural Route 60 overlap
Burim Bridge	부림교	Daehan-ro	Uiryeong County	Burim-myeon	
Uiryeong IC	의령 나들목	Hamyang-Ulsan Expressway	Uiryeong County	Burim-myeon	Under construction
Yeobae Bridge	여배교		Uiryeong County	Burim-myeon	
Wonjin Bridge	원진교		Hapcheon County	Cheongdeok-myeon	
Jeokpo IS	적포삼거리	National Route 24 (Dongbu-ro)	Hapcheon County	Cheongdeok-myeon	National Route 24 overlap
Seokpo Bridge	적포교		Hapcheon County	Cheongdeok-myeon	National Route 24 overlap
Seokpo Bridge			Changnyeong County	Ibang-myeon	National Route 24 overlap
Inam IS	이남삼거리	Prefectural Route 67; Prefectural Route 79 (Ibang-ro)	Changnyeong County	Ibang-myeon	National Route 24 overlap Prefectural Route 67, 79 overlap
Yueo Bridge	유어교		Changnyeong County	Ibang-myeon	National Route 24 overlap Prefectural Route 67, 79 overlap
Yueo Bridge			Changnyeong County	Yueo-myeon	National Route 24 overlap Prefectural Route 67, 79 overlap
Yueo-myeon Office	유어면사무소		Changnyeong County	Yueo-myeon	National Route 24 overlap Prefectural Route 67, 79 overlap
Yueo IS	유어삼거리	National Route 79; Prefectural Route 67 (Yeongsanjangma-ro)	Changnyeong County	Yueo-myeon	National Route 24 overlap Prefectural Route 67, 79 overlap
No name	(이름 없음)	Uponeup-gil	Changnyeong County	Yueo-myeon	National Route 24 overlap
Boncho IS	본초삼거리	Gwandong-gil	Changnyeong County	Daeji-myeon	National Route 24 overlap
Changnyeong IC (Changnyeong IC IS)	창녕 나들목 (창녕IC사거리)	Jungbu Expressway; Upoyueonong-ro	Changnyeong County	Changnyeong-eup	National Route 24 overlap
Orijeong IS	오리정사거리	Prefectural Route 1080 (Upo 2-ro)	Changnyeong County	Changnyeong-eup	National Route 24 overlap
Myeongdeok Elementary School Changnyeong Seokbinggo	명덕초등학교 창녕 석빙고		Changnyeong County	Changnyeong-eup	National Route 24 overlap
Songhyeon IS	송현사거리	Cheokgyeongbi-ro; Hwawangsan-ro	Changnyeong County	Changnyeong-eup	National Route 24 overlap
Changnyeong Gyo-dong and Songhyeon-dong Tombstone	창녕 교동과 송현동 고분군		Changnyeong County	Changnyeong-eup	National Route 24 overlap
Changnyeong Technical High School	창녕공업고등학교		Changnyeong County	Goam-myeon	National Route 24 overlap
Goam IS	고암사거리	Eonmanmisan-ro; Jungdae-gil	Changnyeong County	Goam-myeon	National Route 24 overlap
Goam IS	고암사거리	National Route 24 (Changmil-ro)	Changnyeong County	Goam-myeon	National Route 24 overlap
Goam-myeon Office Jungdae Bridge	고암면사무소 중대교		Changnyeong County	Goam-myeon	
Banggoljae	방골재		Changnyeong County	Goam-myeon	
Banggoljae			Changnyeong County	Seongsan-myeon	
Bangri IS	방리사거리	Prefectural Route 1034 (Seongsan-ro)	Changnyeong County	Seongsan-myeon	
Beotijae IS	버티재삼거리		Changnyeong County	Seongsan-myeon	
Beotijae	버티재		Changnyeong County	Seongsan-myeon	Continuation into North Gyeongsang Province

=== North Gyeongsang Province ===
Name	Hangul name	Connection	Location		Note
Beotijae	버티재		Cheongdo County	Punggak-myeon	South Gyeongsang Province - North Gyeongsang Province border line
Geumgok IS	금곡삼거리	Geumdong-gil	Cheongdo County	Punggak-myeon	
Punggak Overpass	풍각육교	Bonggi-ro; Wolbong-gil	Cheongdo County	Punggak-myeon	
Songseo 1 Bridge	송서1교		Cheongdo County	Punggak-myeon	
Songseo 2 Bridge	송서2교		Cheongdo County	Punggak-myeon	
Songseo 2 Bridge			Cheongdo County	Gaknam-myeon	
Sindang IS	신당 교차로	Prefectural Route 30; Prefectural Route 902 (Gaknam-ro) (Hanjae-ro) (Heolti-ro)	Cheongdo County	Gaknam-myeon	
Yeri IS	예리 교차로	Yeri 4-gil	Cheongdo County	Gaknam-myeon	
Gaknam IS	각남 교차로	Prefectural Route 30 (Iseo-ro)	Cheongdo County	Gaknam-myeon	
Seosang IS	서상 교차로	Dojugwan-ro; Yeonji-ro	Cheongdo County	Hwayang-eup	
Hapcheon IS	합천삼거리	Hwayang-ro	Cheongdo County	Hwayang-eup	
Hwayang IS	화양삼거리	Hwayang-ro	Cheongdo County	Hwayang-eup	
Nulmi IS	눌미사거리	Donggo-gil; Dongcheon 3-gil	Cheongdo County	Hwayang-eup	
Stadium IS (Cheongdo Public Stadium)	운동장앞사거리 (청도공설운동장)		Cheongdo County	Hwayang-eup	
Beomgok IS	범곡사거리	Cheonghwa-ro; Beomgok-gil	Cheongdo County	Hwayang-eup	
Cheongdo Bridge	청도대교		Cheongdo County	Hwayang-eup	
Cheongdo Bridge			Cheongdo County	Cheongdo-eup	
Mogang IS	모강 교차로	National Route 25 (Saemaeul-ro)	Cheongdo County	Cheongdo-eup	
Wondang IS	원당삼거리	Jungang-ro	Cheongdo County	Cheongdo-eup	
Buya IS	부야 교차로	Palchi-gil	Cheongdo County	Cheongdo-eup	
Gomtijae Tunnel	곰티재터널		Cheongdo County	Cheongdo-eup	Approximately 1,030m
Gomtijae Tunnel			Cheongdo County	Maejeon-myeon	Approximately 1,030m
Gomtae IS	곰태 교차로	Gomti-ro	Cheongdo County	Maejeon-myeon	
Gwanha-ri	관하리	Prefectural Route 925 (Gwanbang-ro)	Cheongdo County	Maejeon-myeon	
Maejeon Health Center Maejeon-myeon Office	매전보건지소 매전면사무소		Cheongdo County	Maejeon-myeon	
Maejeon IS	매전삼거리	National Route 58 (Cheongmae-ro)	Cheongdo County	Maejeon-myeon	
Maejeon Bridge IS	매전교삼거리	Prefectural Route 919 (Seonam-ro)	Cheongdo County	Maejeon-myeon	
Donggokjae	동곡재		Cheongdo County	Maejeon-myeon	
Donggokjae			Cheongdo County	Geumcheon-myeon	
Donggok IS	동곡네거리	Prefectural Route 69 (Geumcheon-ro)	Cheongdo County	Geumcheon-myeon	Prefectural Route 69 overlap
Geumcheon-myeon Office	금천면사무소		Cheongdo County	Geumcheon-myeon	Prefectural Route 69 overlap
Geumcheon IS	금천네거리	Prefectural Route 919 (Seonam-ro)	Cheongdo County	Geumcheon-myeon	Prefectural Route 69 overlap
Donggok IS	동곡삼거리	Prefectural Route 919 (Geumcheon-ro)	Cheongdo County	Geumcheon-myeon	Prefectural Route 69, 919 overlap
Bangji Elementary School	방지초등학교		Cheongdo County	Geumcheon-myeon	Prefectural Route 69, 919 overlap
Daecheon Public Bus Terminal	대천공용여객자동차터미널		Cheongdo County	Unmun-myeon	Prefectural Route 69, 919 overlap
Daecheon IS	대천삼거리	Prefectural Route 69 (Unmun-ri)	Cheongdo County	Unmun-myeon	Prefectural Route 69, 919 overlap
Unmundaem	운문댐		Cheongdo County	Unmun-myeon	Prefectural Route 919 overlap
Unmundaem IS	운문댐삼거리	Prefectural Route 919 (Unyong-ro)	Cheongdo County	Unmun-myeon	Prefectural Route 919 overlap
Jichon IS	지촌삼거리	Prefectural Route 921 (Unbuk-ro)	Cheongdo County	Unmun-myeon	Prefectural Route 921 overlap
Jichon 2 Bridge	지촌2교		Cheongdo County	Unmun-myeon	Prefectural Route 921 overlap
Sinwon 1 Bridge Sinwon 2 Bridge	신원1교 신원2교		Cheongdo County	Unmun-myeon	Prefectural Route 921 overlap
Sinwon 1 Bridge Sinwon 2 Bridge			Gyeongju City	Sannae-myeon	Prefectural Route 921 overlap
Sannae IS	산내네거리	Prefectural Route 921 (Munbok-ro)	Gyeongju City	Sannae-myeon	Prefectural Route 921 overlap
Uigok Bridge	의곡교		Gyeongju City	Sannae-myeon	
Danggogae	당고개		Gyeongju City	Sannae-myeon	
Danggogae			Gyeongju City	Geoncheon-eup	
Geocheon IC	건천 나들목	Gyeongbu Expressway	Gyeongju City	Geoncheon-eup	
(Cheonpo-ri)	(천포리)	Danseok-ro	Gyeongju City	Geoncheon-eup	
Yongmyeong Overpass	용명육교		Gyeongju City	Geoncheon-eup	
North Geoncheon IC	북건천 나들목	National Route 4 National Route 35 (Daegyeong-ro)	Gyeongju City	Geoncheon-eup	
Geoncheo Tunnel	건천터널		Gyeongju City	Geoncheon-eup	Right tunnel: Approximately 615m Left tunnel: Approximately 627m
Daegok IS	대곡 교차로	Daegogyongmyeong-gil	Gyeongju City	Geoncheon-eup	
Gyeongju Tunnel	경주터널		Gyeongju City	Geoncheon-eup	Right tunnel: Approximately 2,080m Left tunnel: Approximately 2,060m
Gyeongju Tunnel			Gyeongju City	Hyeongok-myeon	Right tunnel: Approximately 2,080m Left tunnel: Approximately 2,060m
Hyeongok IS	현곡 교차로	Prefectural Route 904 (Yongdam-ro)	Gyeongju City	Hyeongok-myeon	
Malgubul Tunnel	말구불터널		Gyeongju City	Hyeongok-myeon	Right tunnel: Approximately 465m Left tunnel: Approximately 440m
Malgubul Tunnel			Gyeongju City	Angang-eup	Right tunnel: Approximately 465m Left tunnel: Approximately 440m
Sabang IS	사방 교차로	Anhyeon-ro	Gyeongju City	Angang-eup	
Sabang Bridge	사방대교		Gyeongju City	Angang-eup	
Hyeongsangang Bridge	형산강교		Gyeongju City	Angang-eup	
Hyeongsangang Bridge			Gyeongju City	Cheonbuk-myeon	
North Gyeongju IC	북경주 나들목	National Route 7 (Saneop-ro)	Gyeongju City	Cheonbuk-myeon	
No name	(이름 없음)	Hwasangongdan-gil	Gyeongju City	Cheonbuk-myeon	
Sinwangsin Bridge	신왕신교		Gyeongju City	Cheonbuk-myeon	
Gangdong Tunnel	강동터널		Gyeongju City	Cheonbuk-myeon	Right tunnel: Approximately 1,215m Left tunnel: Approximately 1,235m
Gangdong Tunnel			Gyeongju City	Gangdong-myeon	Right tunnel: Approximately 1,215m Left tunnel: Approximately 1,235m
Gangdong Bridge	강동교		Gyeongju City	Gangdong-myeon	
Wangsin IC	왕신 나들목	Prefectural Route 945 (Cheongang-ro)	Gyeongju City	Gangdong-myeon	
Gangdongsandan Bridge	강동산단교	Gangdongsandan-ro	Gyeongju City	Gangdong-myeon	
Ubok IS	우복 교차로	National Route 31 (Yeongilman-daero)	Pohang City	Nam District Yeonil-eup	
Namseong IS	남성 교차로	Honggye-gil 62beon-gil Namseong-gil; Namseong-gil 1-gil	Pohang City	Nam District Daesong-myeon	
Namcheon Bridge	남천교	Unje-ro	Pohang City	Nam District Daesong-myeon	
(Dongkuk Steel)	(동국제강앞)	Jangheung-ro	Pohang City	Nam District	
(Pohang Electrical substation)	(포항변전소)	Goedong-ro; Cheolgang-ro	Pohang City	Nam District	
Jangheung-dong IS	장흥동사거리	Prefectural Route 20 (Cheolkang-ro)	Pohang City	Nam District	
Dongkuk Structures & Construction	동국에스앤씨		Pohang City	Nam District	
Hyundai Special Steel Pohang Factory	현대종합특수강 포항공장	Seoman-ro	Pohang City	Nam District	
POSCO Engineering & Construction Jenae Bridge Goedong Station	포스코건설 제내교 괴동역		Pohang City	Nam District	
Hyundai Steel IS	현대제철삼거리	Donghaean-ro	Pohang City	Nam District	Terminus
