= List of cities and counties of South Gyeongsang Province =

South Gyeongsang Province (Gyeongsangnam-do) is divided into 8 cities (si) and 10 counties (gun). Listed below is each entity's name in English, hangul and hanja.

== Cities ==
- Changwon (창원시; 昌原市, capital)
- Geoje (거제시; 巨濟市)
- Gimhae (김해시; 金海市)
- Jinju (진주시; 晉州市)
- Miryang (밀양시; 密陽市)
- Sacheon (사천시; 泗川市)
- Tongyeong (통영시; 統營市)
- Yangsan (양산시; 梁山市)

== Counties ==
- Changnyeong County (창녕군; 昌寧郡)
- Geochang County (거창군; 居昌郡)
- Goseong County (고성군; 固城郡)
- Hadong County (하동군; 河東郡)
- Haman County (함안군; 咸安郡)
- Hamyang County (함양군; 咸陽郡)
- Hapcheon County (합천군; 陜川郡)
- Namhae County (남해군; 南海郡)
- Sancheong County (산청군; 山淸郡)
- Uiryeong County (의령군; 宜寧郡)

== List by Population and Area ==
Name	Population (2012)	Area (km²)	Population Density (/km²)
Changwon	1,106,081	747.12	
Geoje	245,972	402.3	
Gimhae	531,383	463.26	
Jinju	341,221	712.63	
Miryang	109,967	799.03	
Sacheon	117,968	396.99	
Tongyeong	143,039	236.5	
Yangsan	274,770	484.52	
Changnyeong County	64,297	533.09	
Geochang County	63,536	804.09	
Goseong County	58,553	516.9	
Hadong County	51,235	675.53	
Haman County	70,443	417	
Hamyang County	41,155	725.03	
Hapcheon County	50,713	983.42	
Namhae County	48,899	357	
Sancheong County	36,079	794.59	
Uiryeong County	31,027	482.95	
