= National Route 59 (South Korea) =

Road in South Korea

National Route 59
- 국도 제59호선

Route information
- Length: 494.2 km (307.1 mi)
- Existed: 1 July 1996–present

Major junctions
- South end: Gwangyang, South Jeolla Province
- North end: Yangyang County, Gangwon Province

Location
- Country: South Korea

Highway system
- Highway systems of South Korea; Expressways; National; Local

National Route 59 is a national highway in South Korea connects Gwangyang to Yangyang County. It was established on 1 July 1996.

== Main stopovers ==
South Jeolla Province

- Gwangyang

South Gyeongsang Province

- Hadong County - Sancheong County - Geochang County - Hapcheon County - Geochang County - Hapcheon County

North Gyeongsang Province

- Seongju County - Gimcheon - Gumi - Sangju - Uiseong County - Yecheon County - Mungyeong

North Chungcheong Province

- Damyang County

Gangwon Province

- Yeongwol County - Jeongseon County - Pyeongchang County - Gangneung - Yangyang County

== Major intersections ==
- (■): Motorway

IS: Intersection, IC: Interchange

=== South Jeolla Province ===
Name	Hangul name	Connection	Location		Note
Yongji IS	용지삼거리	National Route 2 (Beagun 1-ro)	Gwangyang City	Taein-dong	Terminus
Seomjin Bridge IS	섬진대교삼거리	Saneop-ro	Gwangyang City	Taein-dong	
Seomjin Bridge	섬진대교		Gwangyang City	Taein-dong	Continuation into South Gyeongsang Province

=== South Gyeongsang Province ===
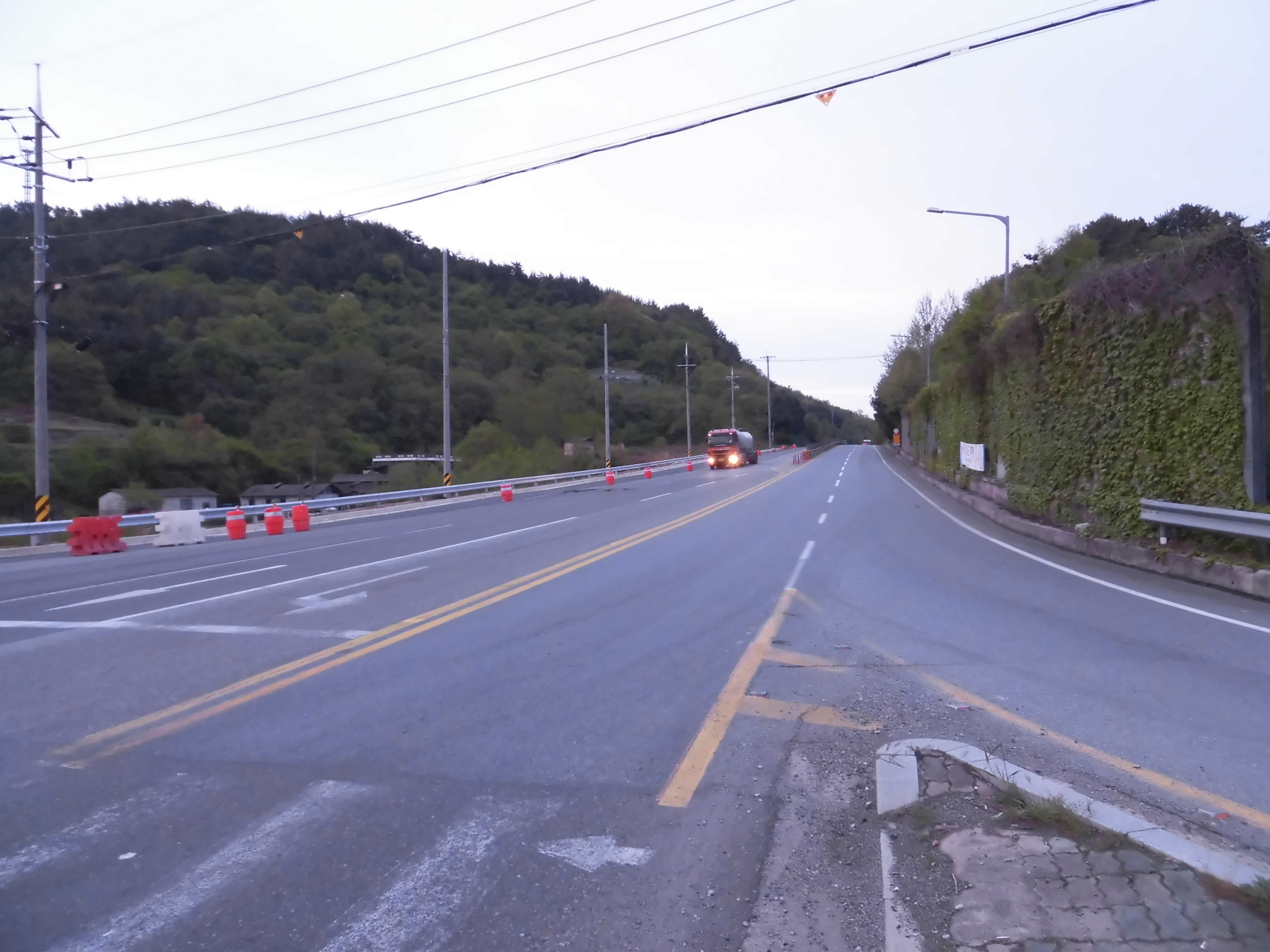
Hadong IC Intersection

Name	Hangul name	Connection	Location		Note
Seomjin Bridge	섬진대교		Hadong County	Geumseong-myeon	South Jeolla Province - South Gyeongsang Province border line
Jinjeongcheon Bridge	진정천교		Hadong County	Geumseong-myeon	
Jinjeongcheon Bridge			Hadong County	Geumnam-myeon	
Hadong IC (Gyecheon IS)	하동 나들목 (계천사거리)	Namhae Expressway; National Route 19 (Seomjingang-daero)	Hadong County	Geumnam-myeon	National Route 19 overlap
Gonam Bridge	고남교		Hadong County	Geumnam-myeon	National Route 19 overlap
Gonam Bridge			Hadong County	Gojeon-myeon	National Route 19 overlap
Jeondo IS	전도 교차로	Hadongeupseong-ro	Hadong County	Gojeon-myeon	National Route 19 overlap
Woljin IS	월진 교차로	Jaecheop-gil	Hadong County	Gojeon-myeon	National Route 19 overlap
Hadongpogu Tunnel	하동포구터널		Hadong County	Gojeon-myeon	National Route 19 overlap Right tunnel: Approximately 625m Left tunnel: Approximately 670m
Sinbang IS	신방 교차로	Jaecheop-gil	Hadong County	Gojeon-myeon	National Route 19 overlap
No name	(이름 없음)	Gongseolundongjang-ro	Hadong County	Gojeon-myeon	National Route 19 overlap
Hoengcheon Bridge	횡천교		Hadong County	Gojeon-myeon	National Route 19 overlap
Hoengcheon Bridge			Hadong County	Hadong-eup	National Route 19 overlap
Gyeseong Bridge	계성교		Hadong County	Hadong-eup	National Route 19 overlap
No name	(이름 없음)	Guncheong-ro	Hadong County	Hadong-eup	National Route 19 overlap
Seomjin Bridge IS	섬진교사거리	National Route 2 Prefectural Route 58 (Gyeongseo-daero); Seomjingang-daero	Hadong County	Hadong-eup	National Route 2, National Route 19 overlap Prefectural Route 58 overlap
Hadong High School Hadong Elementary School	하동고등학교 하동초등학교		Hadong County	Hadong-eup	National Route 2, National Route 19 overlap Prefectural Route 58 overlap
Hadong Police Station	하동경찰서	Guncheong-ro; Hyanggyo 1-gil	Hadong County	Hadong-eup	National Route 2, National Route 19 overlap Prefectural Route 58 overlap
Hadong Intercity Bus Terminal	하동시외버스터미널	National Route 19 (Jungang-ro)	Hadong County	Hadong-eup	National Route 2, National Route 19 overlap Prefectural Route 58 overlap
Hadong Station	하동역		Hadong County	Hadong-eup	National Route 2 overlap Prefectural Route 58 overlap
Bipa IS	비파삼거리	Gongseolundongjang-ro	Hadong County	Hadong-eup	National Route 2 overlap Prefectural Route 58 overlap
Jeokryang-myeon IS	적량면삼거리	Jeokryang-ro	Hadong County	Jeokryang-myeon	National Route 2 overlap Prefectural Route 58 overlap
Hoengcheon Elementary School	횡천초등학교		Hadong County	Hoengcheon-myeon	National Route 2 overlap Prefectural Route 58 overlap
Hoengcheon IS	횡천삼거리	Prefectural Route 1003 (Munhwa 3-gil)	Hadong County	Hoengcheon-myeon	National Route 2 overlap Prefectural Route 58, 1003 overlap
Hoengcheon-myeon Office Hoengcheon Middle School	횡천면사무소 횡천중학교		Hadong County	Hoengcheon-myeon	National Route 2 overlap Prefectural Route 58, 1003 overlap
Daedeok IS	대덕삼거리	National Route 2 Prefectural Route 58; Prefectural Route 1003 (Gyeongseo-daero)	Hadong County	Hoengcheon-myeon	National Route 2 overlap Prefectural Route 58, 1003 overlap
No name	(이름 없음)	Anyang-ro	Hadong County	Hoengcheon-myeon	
Hoesin IS	회신삼거리	Prefectural Route 1014 (Hogyecheon-ro)	Hadong County	Okjong-myeon	Prefectural Route 1014 overlap
Witae IS	위태삼거리	Prefectural Route 1014 (Gunghang-gil)	Hadong County	Okjong-myeon	Prefectural Route 1014 overlap
Witaema-eul	위태마을		Hadong County	Okjong-myeon	Unpaved section
Jalchijae	갈치재		Hadong County	Okjong-myeon	Unpaved section
Jalchijae			Sancheong County	Sicheon-myeon	Unpaved section
(Oegongma-eul)	(외공마을)	National Route 20; Prefectural Route 1047 (Jirisan-daero)	Sancheong County	Sicheon-myeon	National Route 20 overlap
Wonri IS	원리 교차로	National Route 20 (Jirisan-daero)	Sancheong County	Sicheon-myeon	National Route 20 overlap
Deoksan Middle School Deoksan High School	덕산중학교 덕산고등학교		Sancheong County	Sicheon-myeon	
Wonri IS	원리삼거리	Nammyeong-ro	Sancheong County	Sicheon-myeon	
Daeha IS	대하사거리	Chinhwangyeong-ro 293beon-gil	Sancheong County	Samyang-myeon	
Hucheon IS	후천삼거리	Deoksandaepo-ro	Sancheong County	Samyang-myeon	
Chansaem IS	찬샘사거리	Seodang-gil	Sancheong County	Samyang-myeon	
Seoknam IS	석남삼거리	Chinhwangyeong-ro 719beon-gil	Sancheong County	Samyang-myeon	
Samjang Elementary School	삼장초등학교		Sancheong County	Samyang-myeon	
Myeongsang IS	명상삼거리	Pyeongchonyupyeong-ro	Sancheong County	Samyang-myeon	
Bammeorijae	밤머리재		Sancheong County	Samyang-myeon	
Bammeorijae			Sancheong County	Geumseo-myeon	
No name	(이름 없음)	Chinhwangyeong-ro 2211beon-gil	Sancheong County	Geumseo-myeon	
Maechon IS	매촌삼거리	Prefectural Route 60; Prefectural Route 1001 (Donguibogam-ro)	Sancheong County	Geumseo-myeon	Prefectural Route 60, 1001 overlap
Geumseo-myeon Office	금서면사무소		Sancheong County	Geumseo-myeon	Prefectural Route 60, 1001 overlap
(North Gyeongho 1 Bridge)	(경호1교 북단)	Prefectural Route 1001 (Kkotbongsan-ro)	Sancheong County	Geumseo-myeon	Prefectural Route 60, 1001 overlap
Sancheong IC	산청 나들목	Tongyeong-Daejeon Expressway	Sancheong County	Geumseo-myeon	Prefectural Route 60 overlap
Gyeongho Bridge	경호교		Sancheong County	Geumseo-myeon	Prefectural Route 60 overlap
Gyeongho Bridge			Sancheong County	Sancheong-eup	Prefectural Route 60 overlap
Sancheong IS	산청 교차로	National Route 3 Prefectural Route 60 (Sancheong-daero); Prefectural Route 26 (Sansu-ro)	Sancheong County	Sancheong-eup	Prefectural Route 60 overlap
Dalimjae	달임재		Sancheong County	Sancheong-eup	
Dalimjae			Sancheong County	Chahwang-myeon	
Chahwang IS	차황삼거리	Chinhwangyeong-ro	Sancheong County	Chahwang-myeon	
Hwangsan Bridge IS	황산교삼거리	Prefectural Route 1006 (Sincha-ro)	Sancheong County	Chahwang-myeon	
Samgeo Bridge (east side)	삼거교 동단	Prefectural Route 1026 (Odong-ro)	Sancheong County	Chahwang-myeon	Prefectural Route 1026 overlap
No name	(이름 없음)	Prefectural Route 1026 (Chahwangdaebyeong-ro)	Sancheong County	Chahwang-myeon	Prefectural Route 1026 overlap
Geochang Event Memorial Park	거창사건추모공원		Geochang County	Sinwon-myeon	
Geochang Middle School Sinwon Branch Sinwon Elementary School Sinwon-myeon Office	거창중학교 신원분교 신원초등학교 신원면사무소		Geochang County	Sinwon-myeon	
Gwajeong IS	과정삼거리	Prefectural Route 1034 (Cheongsu-ro)	Geochang County	Sinwon-myeon	Prefectural Route 1034 overlap
Yangji IS	양지삼거리	Prefectural Route 1089 (Bamtijae-ro)	Geochang County	Sinwon-myeon	Prefectural Route 1034, 1089 overlap
Suwon IS	수원삼거리	Prefectural Route 1089 (Seobu-ro)	Geochang County	Sinwon-myeon	Prefectural Route 1034, 1089 overlap
Yangji Clinic	양지보건진료소		Hapcheon County	Bongsan-myeon	Prefectural Route 1034 overlap
Geoan IS	거안삼거리	Wolhaeng-ro	Hapcheon County	Bongsan-myeon	Prefectural Route 1034 overlap
Hapcheon Middle School Bongsan Branch (Closed)	합천중학교 봉산분교(폐교)		Hapcheon County	Bongsan-myeon	Prefectural Route 1034 overlap
Bongsan Bridge	봉산교		Hapcheon County	Bongsan-myeon	Prefectural Route 1034 overlap
Bongsan IS	봉산삼거리	National Route 24; National Route 26; Prefectural Route 34 (Yeongseo-ro)	Hapcheon County	Bongsan-myeon	Prefectural Route 1034 overlap
Disconnect
Dori	도리	Prefectural Route 1084 (Gajogaya-ro)	Geochang County	Gajo-myeon	Prefectural Route 1084 overlap
Adelscott CC	아델스코트CC		Hapcheon County	Gaya-myeon	Prefectural Route 1084 overlap
(Maean-ri)	(매안리)	Prefectural Route 1036 (Maean 1-gil)	Hapcheon County	Gaya-myeon	Prefectural Route 1084 overlap
No name	(이름 없음)	Maeandaejeon-gil	Hapcheon County	Gaya-myeon	Prefectural Route 1084 overlap
Gasan Elementary School	가산초등학교		Hapcheon County	Gaya-myeon	Prefectural Route 1084 overlap
Haein Middle School	해인중학교		Hapcheon County	Gaya-myeon	Prefectural Route 1084 overlap
Hwangsan Bridge (east side)	황산교 동단	Prefectural Route 1084 (Gayasijang-ro)	Hapcheon County	Gaya-myeon	Prefectural Route 1084 overlap
Gaya Bus Stop Gaya-myeon Office	가야합동버스정류장 가야면사무소		Hapcheon County	Gaya-myeon	
Gaya Bridge	가야교		Hapcheon County	Gaya-myeon	
Yacheon IS	야천삼거리	Gayasan-ro	Hapcheon County	Gaya-myeon	
Soltijae	솔티재		Hapcheon County	Gaya-myeon	Continuation into North Gyeongsang Province

=== North Gyeongsang Province ===
Name	Hangul name	Connection	Location		Note
Soltijae	솔티재		Seongju County	Suryun-myeon	South Gyeongsang Province - North Gyeongsang Province border line
Gayasan Baegun-dong	가야산 백운동		Seongju County	Suryun-myeon	
No name	(이름 없음)	Deogun-ro	Seongju County	Suryun-myeon	
Suryun IS	수륜삼거리	National Route 33 (Chambyeol-ro)	Seongju County	Suryun-myeon	National Route 33 overlap
Suryun-myeon Office Suryun Elementary School	수륜면사무소 수륜초등학교		Seongju County	Suryun-myeon	National Route 33 overlap
Yangjeong IS Hoeyeonseowon	양정삼거리 회연서원	Prefectural Route 913 (Dongganghangang-ro)	Seongju County	Suryun-myeon	National Route 33 overlap
No name	(이름 없음)	National Route 33 (Gaya-ro)	Seongju County	Suryun-myeon	National Route 33 overlap
Hwajuk Bridge	화죽교		Seongju County	Suryun-myeon	
Hwajuk Bridge			Seongju County	Gacheon-myeon	
Gacheon IS	가천삼거리	Chambyeol-ro	Seongju County	Gacheon-myeon	
Gacheon Elementary School Gacheon-myeon Office	가천초등학교 가천면사무소		Seongju County	Gacheon-myeon	
Changcheon IS	창천삼거리	Prefectural Route 903 (Changeum-ro)	Seongju County	Gacheon-myeon	
Changcheon Bridge	창천교		Seongju County	Gacheon-myeon	
Seongju Dam	성주댐		Seongju County	Gacheon-myeon	
Sinseong IS	신성삼거리	National Route 30 (Seongju-ro)	Seongju County	Geumsu-myeon	National Route 30 overlap
Hupyeong IS	후평삼거리	National Route 30 (Seongju-ro)	Seongju County	Geumsu-myeon	National Route 30 overlap
Saltajae	살타재		Seongju County	Geumsu-myeon	
Saltajae			Gimcheon City	Joma-myeon	
Yongho IS	용호삼거리	Yongho-ro	Gimcheon City	Gamcheon-myeon	
Dopyeong IS	도평삼거리	Muan-ro	Gimcheon City	Gamcheon-myeon	
Gamcheon Elementary School Gamcheon-myeon Office	감천초등학교 감천면사무소		Gimcheon City	Gamcheon-myeon	
Gamcheon IS	감천 교차로	National Route 3	Gimcheon City	Gamcheon-myeon	
Gamcheon IS	감천삼거리	National Route 4 (Hwangsan-ro)	Gimcheon City	Jijwa-dong	National Route 4 overlap
Gimcheon Bridge IS	김천교 교차로	Baedari-gil; Hwangsan 3-gil	Gimcheon City	Jijwa-dong	National Route 4 overlap
Gimcheon Bridge IS	김천교사거리	Gangbyeon-ro	Gimcheon City	Jasan-dong	National Route 4 overlap
Yongam IS	용암사거리	National Route 4 (Jasan-ro)	Gimcheon City	Jasan-dong	National Route 4 overlap
Jasan-dong Community Center	자산동주민센터		Gimcheon City	Jasan-dong	
Seonsantongro IS	선산통로사거리	Prefectural Route 514 (Yeongnam-daero); Gangbyeon-ro	Gimcheon City	Jasan-dong	
Agricultural Wholesale Market	농산물도매시장앞	Gongdan-ro	Gimcheon City	Daesin-dong	
No name	(이름 없음)	Prefectural Route 913 (Gammun-ro)	Gimcheon City	Daesin-dong	
Seobu IS	서부 교차로	National Route 3	Gimcheon City	Gaeryeong-myeon	
Gwangcheon Entrance	광천입구	Prefectural Route 997 (Gwanghan 1-gil)	Gimcheon City	Gaeryeong-myeon	
Gammun Bridge	감문교		Gimcheon City	Gaeryeong-myeon	
Gammun Bridge			Gimcheon City	Gammun-myeon	
Baesinae IS	배시내삼거리	Gammun-ro	Gimcheon City	Gammun-myeon	
Seuprye Bridge	습례교		Gumi City	Seonsan-eup	
Maesil Bridge	매실교		Gumi City	Seonsan-eup	
3rd Imun Square	이문3호광장	Prefectural Route 68; Prefectural Route 916 (Seonsangseo-ro)	Gumi City	Seonsan-eup	Prefectural Route 68, 916 overlap
1st Square	1호광장	National Route 33; Prefectural Route 916 (Seonsan-daero)	Gumi City	Seonsan-eup	National Route 33 overlap Prefectural Route 68, 916 overlap
Seonsan Terminal	선산터미널		Gumi City	Seonsan-eup	National Route 33 overlap Prefectural Route 68 overlap
Sinae IS	시내 교차로	Seonsanjungang-ro	Gumi City	Seonsan-eup	National Route 33 overlap Prefectural Route 68 overlap
Gyori IS	교리삼거리	National Route 33; Prefectural Route 68 (Seonsan-daero)	Gumi City	Seonsan-eup	National Route 33 overlap Prefectural Route 68 overlap
Saenggok IS	생곡삼거리	Gangdong-ro	Gumi City	Seonsan-eup	
Nongso Bridge	농소교		Gumi City	Okseong-myeon	
Okseong IS	옥성삼거리	Juaryeong-ro	Gumi City	Okseong-myeon	
Gubong IS	구봉삼거리	Prefectural Route 912 (Sanchonokgwan-ro)	Gumi City	Okseong-myeon	Prefectural Route 912 overlap
Nakdan IS	낙단 교차로	National Route 25 (Nakdong-daero)	Sangju City	Nakdong-myeon	Prefectural Route 912 overlap
Nakdong IS	낙동삼거리	Prefectural Route 912 (Yeongnamjeil-ro)	Sangju City	Nakdong-myeon	Prefectural Route 912 overlap
Nakdong Bus Stop	낙동버스정류장		Sangju City	Nakdong-myeon	
Gujam IS	구잠삼거리	Yeongnamjeil-ro	Sangju City	Nakdong-myeon	
East Sangju IC	동상주 나들목	Dangjin-Yeongdeok Expressway	Sangju City	Nakdong-myeon	
Jungdong Bridge	중동교		Sangju City	Nakdong-myeon	
Jungdong Bridge			Sangju City	Jungdong-myeon	
Deokji Bridge	덕지교		Uiseong County	Dain-myeon	
Seoreung IS	서릉삼거리	National Route 28 (Seobu-ro)	Uiseong County	Dain-myeon	National Route 28 overlap
Deokmi IS	덕미삼거리	National Route 28 (Seobu-ro)	Uiseong County	Dain-myeon	National Route 28 overlap
Pungyang IS	풍양사거리	Prefectural Route 916; Prefectural Route 923 (Sangpung-ro); Naksang 2-gil	Yecheon County	Pungyang-myeon	Prefectural Route 916, 923 overlap
Oji IS	오지사거리	Prefectural Route 916; Prefectural Route 923 (Pungji-ro); Naksang 1-gil	Yecheon County	Pungyang-myeon	Prefectural Route 916, 923 overlap
Cheongun IS	청운삼거리	Cheongun-gil	Yecheon County	Pungyang-myeon	
Samgang Bridge	삼강교		Yecheon County	Pungyang-myeon	
Samgang Bridge			Mungyeong City	Yeongsun-myeon	
Oryong IS	오룡삼거리	Prefectural Route 924 (Yeongsun-ro)	Mungyeong City	Yeongsun-myeon	
Wangtae IS	왕태삼거리	Taepyeong-gil	Mungyeong City	Yeongsun-myeon	
Bulam IS	불암사거리	Sanyang-ro; Buram 2-gil	Mungyeong City	Sanyang-myeon	
Bulam IS	불암삼거리	Sanyang-ro	Mungyeong City	Sanyang-myeon	
Bongjeong IS	봉정삼거리	Prefectural Route 923 (Chusan-ro)	Mungyeong City	Sanyang-myeon	Prefectural Route 923 overlap
Sanbuk Elementary School Sanbuk Middle School Sanbuk-myeon Office	산북초등학교 산북중학교 산북면사무소		Mungyeong City	Sanbuk-myeon	Prefectural Route 923 overlap
Daesang IS	대상삼거리	Gangdong-ro	Mungyeong City	Sanbuk-myeon	Prefectural Route 923 overlap
No name	(이름 없음)	Prefectural Route 923 (Undal-ro)	Mungyeong City	Sanbuk-myeon	Prefectural Route 923 overlap
Gyeongcheon Dam	경천댐		Mungyeong City	Dongno-myeon	
Supyeong IS	수평삼거리	Prefectural Route 928 (Yongmungyeongcheon-ro)	Mungyeong City	Dongno-myeon	
East Heogungdari	허궁다리 서단	Prefectural Route 901 (Seokhangmyeongbong-ro)	Mungyeong City	Dongno-myeon	Prefectural Route 901 overlap
Noeun IS	노은삼거리	Noeun 1-gil	Mungyeong City	Dongno-myeon	Prefectural Route 901 overlap
Dongno Bridge	동로교		Mungyeong City	Dongno-myeon	Prefectural Route 901 overlap
Jeokseong IS	적성삼거리	Prefectural Route 901 (Yeoumong-ro)	Mungyeong City	Dongno-myeon	Prefectural Route 901 overlap
Beoljae	벌재		Mungyeong City	Dongno-myeon	Elevation 625m
Jeokseong Bridge	적성교		Mungyeong City	Dongno-myeon	Continuation into North Chungcheong Province

=== North Chungcheong Province ===
Name	Hangul name	Connection	Location		Note
Jeokseong Bridge	적성교		Danyang County	Daegang-myeon	North Gyeongsang Province - North Chungcheong Province border line
Banggok-ri	방곡리	Doye-ro	Danyang County	Daegang-myeon	
Banggok IS	방곡삼거리	Doraksan-ro	Danyang County	Daegang-myeon	
Beolcheon IS	벌천삼거리	Beolcheon-ro	Danyang County	Danseong-myeon	
Teukseonam Bridge	특선암교		Danyang County	Danseong-myeon	
Gasan IS	가산삼거리	Sainam-ro	Danyang County	Danseong-myeon	
Dancheon Elementary School Gasan Branch School	단천초등학교 가산분교		Danyang County	Danseong-myeon	
Haseonam Bridge	하선암교		Danyang County	Danseong-myeon	
Soseonam Natural Forest	소선암자연휴양림		Danyang County	Danseong-myeon	
Uhwa IS	우화삼거리	National Route 36 (Worak-ro)	Danyang County	Danseong-myeon	National Route 36 overlap
Danseong Middle School	단성중학교		Danyang County	Danseong-myeon	National Route 36 overlap
Danseong IS	단성삼거리	Chunghon-ro	Danyang County	Danseong-myeon	National Route 36 overlap
Bukha IS	북하삼거리	National Route 5 National Route 36 (Danyang-ro)	Danyang County	Danseong-myeon	National Route 5, National Route 36 overlap
Danseong Station	단성역		Danyang County	Danseong-myeon	National Route 5 overlap
Deokseong Bridge Hyeoncheon Bridge	덕상교 현천교		Danyang County	Danyang-eup	National Route 5 overlap
Danyang Station	단양역		Danyang County	Danyang-eup	National Route 5 overlap
Sangjin Bridge	상진대교		Danyang County	Danyang-eup	National Route 5 overlap
Danyang IS (Danyang IS) (Sangjin IS)	단양삼거리 (단양 교차로) (상진 교차로)	National Route 5 (Danyang-ro)	Danyang County	Danyang-eup	National Route 5 overlap
Daemyung Resort Sogeumjeong Park	대명리조트 단양 소금정공원		Danyang County	Danyang-eup	
Danyang Market	단양시장		Danyang County	Danyang-eup	
Byeolgok IS	별곡사거리	Sambong-ro; Jungang 1-ro	Danyang County	Danyang-eup	
Danyang Intercity Bus Terminal	단양시외버스터미널		Danyang County	Danyang-eup	
Gosu Bridge	고수대교		Danyang County	Danyang-eup	
Gosu IS	고수삼거리	Darian-ro	Danyang County	Danyang-eup	
Gosujae	고수재		Danyang County	Danyang-eup	
Gosujae			Danyang County	Gagok-myeon	
Deokcheon Bridge IS	덕천교삼거리	Yeocheondeokcheon-ro	Danyang County	Gagok-myeon	
Apyeong IS	아평삼거리	Saebat-ro	Danyang County	Gagok-myeon	
Gagok Elementary School Gagok Middle School Gagok-myeon Office	가곡초등학교 가곡중학교 가곡면사무소		Danyang County	Gagok-myeon	
Gadae Bridge IS	가대교삼거리	Prefectural Route 519 (Eosangcheon-ro)	Danyang County	Gagok-myeon	
Hyangsan IS	향산삼거리	Prefectural Route 595 (Guinsa-ro)	Danyang County	Gagok-myeon	
Gungan Bridge	군간교		Danyang County	Gagok-myeon	
Gungan Bridge			Danyang County	Yeongchun-myeon	
Gungan Bridge IS	군간교삼거리	Prefectural Route 522 (Gangbyeon-ro)	Danyang County	Yeongchun-myeon	Prefectural Route 522 overlap
Yeongchun-myeon Sajiwon-ri IS	영춘면 사지원리 교차로	Sajiwon-ro	Danyang County	Yeongchun-myeon	Prefectural Route 522 overlap
Byeolbang IS	별방삼거리	Prefectural Route 522 (Byeolbangmanjong-ro)	Danyang County	Yeongchun-myeon	Prefectural Route 522 overlap
Myeongjeonma-eul	명전마을		Danyang County	Yeongchun-myeon	Continuation into Gangwon Province

=== Gangwon Province ===
Name	Hangul name	Connection	Location		Note
Changwon-ri	창원리		Yeongwol County	Nam-myeon	North Chungcheong Province - Gangwon Province border line
Jangwon IS	창원삼거리	Prefectural Route 519 (Yeongwol-ro)	Yeongwol County	Nam-myeon	
Yeondang Station	연당역		Yeongwol County	Nam-myeon	
Yeondang IS	연당 교차로	National Route 38 (Gangwonnam-ro); Prefectural Route 88 (Yeongwol-ro); Jeondang-ro	Yeongwol County	Nam-myeon	National Route 38 overlap Prefectural Route 88 overlap
Gakhan Tunnel	각한터널		Yeongwol County	Nam-myeon	National Route 38 overlap Prefectural Route 88 overlap Approximately 945m
Seondeul Bridge			Yeongwol County	Nam-myeon	National Route 38 overlap Prefectural Route 88 overlap
Seondeul Bridge			Yeongwol County	Yeongwol-eup	National Route 38 overlap Prefectural Route 88 overlap
Bangjeol Tunnel	방절터널		Yeongwol County	Yeongwol-eup	National Route 38 overlap Prefectural Route 88 overlap Approximately 230m
Seoyeongwol IS	서영월 교차로	Prefectural Route 88 (Yeongwoldong-ro)	Yeongwol County	Yeongwol-eup	National Route 38 overlap Prefectural Route 88 overlap
Yeongwol 1 Tunnel	영월1터널		Yeongwol County	Yeongwol-eup	National Route 38 overlap Right tunnel: Approximately 490m Left tunnel: Approximately 390m
Jangneung Overpass	장릉육교		Yeongwol County	Yeongwol-eup	National Route 38 overlap
Yeongwol 2 Tunnel	영월2터널		Yeongwol County	Yeongwol-eup	National Route 38 overlap Approximately 980m
Bongnae 1 Bridge	봉래1교		Yeongwol County	Yeongwol-eup	National Route 38 overlap
Bongnae Tunnel	봉래터널		Yeongwol County	Yeongwol-eup	National Route 38 overlap Right tunnel: Approximately 945m Left tunnel: Approximately 990m
Bongnae 2 Bridge Deokpo 1 Bridge Deokpo 2 Bridge	봉래2교 덕포1교 덕포2교		Yeongwol County	Yeongwol-eup	National Route 38 overlap
Dongyeongwol IS	동영월 교차로	National Route 31 (Yeongwol-ro)	Yeongwol County	Yeongwol-eup	National Route 31, 38 overlap
Dupyeong Bridge Saetdol Bridge Bansong Bridge	두평교 샛돌교 반송교		Yeongwol County	Yeongwol-eup	National Route 31, 38 overlap
Bansong Tunnel	반송터널		Yeongwol County	Yeongwol-eup	National Route 31, 38 overlap Approximately 270m
Yeonha IS	연하 교차로	Yeongwol-ro	Yeongwol County	Yeongwol-eup	National Route 31, 38 overlap
Yeonha Bridge	연하대교		Yeongwol County	Yeongwol-eup	National Route 31, 38 overlap
Seokhang 1 Tunnel			Yeongwol County	Yeongwol-eup	National Route 31, 38 overlap Approximately 1,050m
Seokhang 1 Tunnel			Yeongwol County	Jungdong-myeon	National Route 31, 38 overlap Approximately 1,050m
Yeonsang Bridge	연상교		Yeongwol County	Jungdong-myeon	National Route 31, 38 overlap
Seokhang 2 Tunnel	석항2터널		Yeongwol County	Jungdong-myeon	National Route 31, 38 overlap Right tunnel: Approximately 360m Left tunnel: Approximately 420m
Seokhang IS	석항 교차로	National Route 31; Prefectural Route 28 (Yeongwol-ro)	Yeongwol County	Jungdong-myeon	National Route 31, 38 overlap Prefectural Route 28 overlap
Sindong IS	신동 교차로	Prefectural Route 421 (Uirim-ro)	Jeongseon County	Sindong-eup	National Route 38 overlap Prefectural Route 28 overlap
Yemi IS	예미 교차로	Donggang-ro; Uirim-ro	Jeongseon County	Sindong-eup	National Route 38 overlap Prefectural Route 28 overlap
Uirim IS	의림삼거리	Uirim-ro	Jeongseon County	Sindong-eup	National Route 38 overlap Prefectural Route 28 overlap
Machajae (Macharyeong)	마차재(마차령)		Jeongseon County	Sindong-eup	National Route 38 overlap Prefectural Route 28 overlap
Machajae (Macharyeong)			Jeongseon County	Nam-myeon	National Route 38 overlap Prefectural Route 28 overlap
Mungok IS	문곡 교차로	National Route 38; Prefectural Route 28 (Gangwonnam-ro)	Jeongseon County	Nam-myeon	National Route 38 overlap Prefectural Route 28 overlap
Byeoreogok Bridge	별어곡교		Jeongseon County	Nam-myeon	
Nammyeon IS	남면사거리	Prefectural Route 421 (Jamiwon-gil); Muneundan-ro	Jeongseon County	Nam-myeon	
Nammyeon Elementary School Nam-myeon Office Byeoreogok Station	남선초등학교 남면사무소 별어곡역		Jeongseon County	Nam-myeon	
Mungok Bridge	문곡교	Yaksu-gil	Jeongseon County	Nam-myeon	
Yupyeong Bridge	유평교		Jeongseon County	Nam-myeon	
Nakdong IS	낙동삼거리	Gwangnak-ro	Jeongseon County	Nam-myeon	
Swaejae Tunnel	쇄재터널		Jeongseon County	Nam-myeon	Approximately 650m
Swaejae Tunnel			Jeongseon County	Jeongseon-eup	Approximately 650m
Deoku IS	덕우삼거리	Prefectural Route 424 (Sogeumgang-ro)	Jeongseon County	Jeongseon-eup	Prefectural Route 424 overlap
Woltong IS	월통 교차로	Saeteo-gil	Jeongseon County	Jeongseon-eup	Prefectural Route 424 overlap
Woltong 1 Bridge	월통1교		Jeongseon County	Jeongseon-eup	Prefectural Route 424 overlap
Kkachiljae Tunnel	까칠재터널		Jeongseon County	Jeongseon-eup	Prefectural Route 424 overlap Approximately 377m
Sinwol IS	신월 교차로	Wapyeong 1-gil Wapyeong 2-gil	Jeongseon County	Jeongseon-eup	Prefectural Route 424 overlap
Wapyeong 1 Bridge Beombawi Bridge	와평1교 범바위교		Jeongseon County	Jeongseon-eup	Prefectural Route 424 overlap
Aesan IS	애산 교차로	Aesan-ro; Saeteo-gil	Jeongseon County	Jeongseon-eup	Prefectural Route 424 overlap
(Piam Tunnel)	(피암터널)		Jeongseon County	Jeongseon-eup	Prefectural Route 424 overlap Approximately 60m
(Piam Tunnel)	(피암터널)		Jeongseon County	Jeongseon-eup	Prefectural Route 424 overlap Approximately 60m
(Piam Tunnel)	(피암터널)		Jeongseon County	Jeongseon-eup	Prefectural Route 424 overlap Approximately 20m
Jeongseon 1 Bridge IS	정선1교삼거리	Prefectural Route 424 (Jeongseon-ro)	Jeongseon County	Jeongseon-eup	Prefectural Route 424 overlap
County Office IS	군청앞삼거리	Bongyang 3-gil	Jeongseon County	Jeongseon-eup	
Eup Office	읍사무소앞	Bongyang 5-gil	Jeongseon County	Jeongseon-eup	
Bongyang IS	봉양사거리	Jeongseon-ro; Bongyang 6-gil	Jeongseon County	Jeongseon-eup	
Office of Education (Jeongseon Office of Education)	교육청앞 (정선교육지원청)	Bibong-ro; Bongyang 6-gil	Jeongseon County	Jeongseon-eup	
Jeongseon 2 Bridge IS	정선2교사거리	Noksong-ro; Jeongseon-ro	Jeongseon County	Jeongseon-eup	
Deoksong IS	덕송 교차로	National Route 42 (Seodong-ro)	Jeongseon County	Jeongseon-eup	National Route 42 overlap
Deoksong IS	덕송삼거리	Nampyeonggangbyeon-ro	Jeongseon County	Jeongseon-eup	National Route 42 overlap
Najeon IS	나전삼거리	National Route 42 (Seodong-ro)	Jeongseon County	Bukpyeong-myeon	National Route 42 overlap
Sukam Valley	숙암계곡		Jeongseon County	Bukpyeong-myeon	
Jangjeon Valley	장전계곡		Pyeongchang County	Jinbu-myeon	
Galdong Bridge	갈동교		Pyeongchang County	Jinbu-myeon	
Makdong 3 IS	막동3 교차로	Odaecheon-ro	Pyeongchang County	Jinbu-myeon	
(Bridge)	(교량)		Pyeongchang County	Jinbu-myeon	
Suhyang Tunnel	수향터널		Pyeongchang County	Jinbu-myeon	Approximately 496m
Dokga IS	독가 교차로	Odaecheon-ro	Pyeongchang County	Jinbu-myeon	
Mapyeong Bridge	마평교	Odaecheon-ro	Pyeongchang County	Jinbu-myeon	
Mapyeong 1 Tunnel	마평1터널		Pyeongchang County	Jinbu-myeon	Approximately 250m
Mapyeong 2 Tunnel	마평2터널		Pyeongchang County	Jinbu-myeon	Approximately 650m
Singi Bridge	신기교		Pyeongchang County	Jinbu-myeon	
Singi IS	신기 교차로	Prefectural Route 410 (Hasongjeong-gil)	Pyeongchang County	Jinbu-myeon	
Songjeong 1 Bridge Songjeong 2 Bridge	송정1교 송정2교		Pyeongchang County	Jinbu-myeon	
Geomun IS	거문 교차로	Odaecheon-ro	Pyeongchang County	Jinbu-myeon	
Songjeong IS	송정 교차로	Hasongjeong-gil	Pyeongchang County	Jinbu-myeon	
Hajinbu IS	하진부교차로	National Route 6 (Gyeonggang-ro); Jinbujungang-ro	Pyeongchang County	Jinbu-myeon	National Route 6 overlap
Jinbu Sports Park IS	진부체육공원교차로	Seokdu-ro	Pyeongchang County	Jinbu-myeon	National Route 6 overlap
Odae Bridge IS (Jinbu IC)	오대교사거리 (진부 나들목)	Yeongdong Expressway	Pyeongchang County	Jinbu-myeon	National Route 6 overlap
No name	(이름 없음)	Jinbujungang-ro	Pyeongchang County	Jinbu-myeon	National Route 6 overlap
No name	(이름 없음)	Bangadari-ro	Pyeongchang County	Jinbu-myeon	National Route 6 overlap
Woljeong IS	월정삼거리	Prefectural Route 456 (Gyeonggang-ro)	Pyeongchang County	Jinbu-myeon	National Route 6 overlap
Byeongan IS	병안삼거리	Odaesan-ro	Pyeongchang County	Daegwalnyeong-myeon	National Route 6 overlap
Jingogae	진고개		Pyeongchang County	Daegwalnyeong-myeon	National Route 6 overlap
Jingogae			Gangneung City	Yeongok-myeon	National Route 6 overlap
Buyeon-dong IS	부연동삼거리	National Route 6 (Jingogae-ro)	Gangneung City	Yeongok-myeon	
Baekdudaegan Income Insurance Support Office	백두대간 소득지원사업장		Gangneung City	Yeongok-myeon	Unpaved section
Jeonhuchi	전후치		Gangneung City	Yeongok-myeon	Unpaved section
Buyeon-dong Valley	부연동계곡		Gangneung City	Yeongok-myeon	Unpaved section
Badujae	바두재		Gangneung City	Yeongok-myeon	Unpaved section
Badujae			Yangyang County	Hyeonbuk-myeon	Unpaved section
Gojeokchi	고적치		Yangyang County	Hyeonbuk-myeon	Unpaved section
Eoseongjeon 1 Bridge Eoseongjeon 2 Bridge	어성전1교 어성전2교		Yangyang County	Hyeonbuk-myeon	Unpaved section
Hyeonseong IS	현성삼거리	Prefectural Route 418 (Songi-ro)	Yangyang County	Hyeonbuk-myeon	Unpaved section
Eoseongjeon Bridge Hwangpyeong Bridge	어성전교 황평교		Yangyang County	Hyeonbuk-myeon	
Eoseongjeon IS	어성전삼거리	Eoseongjeon-gil	Yangyang County	Hyeonbuk-myeon	
Woniljeon IS	원일전 교차로	Woniljeon-gil	Yangyang County	Hyeonbuk-myeon	
Nolgol IS	놀골 교차로	Busochi-gil	Yangyang County	Hyeonbuk-myeon	
Yangjimal Bridge	양지말교		Yangyang County	Hyeonbuk-myeon	
Yangjimal Bridge			Yangyang County	Seo-myeon	
Naehyeon Bridge Suri 2 Bridge Suri 1 Bridge Yongcheon 2 Bridge	내현교 수리2교 수리1교 용천2교		Yangyang County	Seo-myeon	
Hannam Elementary School	한남초등학교		Yangyang County	Seo-myeon	
Yongcheon 1 Bridge	용천1교		Yangyang County	Seo-myeon	
Yongcheon 1 Bridge			Yangyang County	Yangyang-eup	
Namdan IS	남단 교차로	Ansan 1-gil	Yangyang County	Yangyang-eup	
Songhyeon IS	송현사거리	National Route 7 (Donghae-daero)	Yangyang County	Sonyang-myeon	Terminus
