= Local Route 28 (South Korea) =

State-Funded Local Highway 28
- 국가지원지방도 제28호선
- Yeongju-Donghae Line 영주 ~ 동해선

Route information
- Length: 135.4 km (84.1 mi)
- Existed: 17 November 2008–present

Major junctions
- West end: Bonghyeon-myeon, Yeongju, North Gyeongsang
- East end: Danbong-dong, Donghae, Gangwon

Location
- Country: South Korea

Highway system
- Highway systems of South Korea; Expressways; National; Local

Local Route 28 Yeongju–Donghae Line (Korean: 국가지원지방도 제28호선 영주 ~ 동해선) is a local route of South Korea that is connecting Yeongju, North Gyeongsang Province to Donghae, Gangwon Province.

== History ==
This route was established on 17 November 2008.

== Stopovers ==
North Gyeongsang Province

- Yeongju

North Chungcheong Province

- Danyang County

Gangwon Province

- Yeongwol County - Jeongseon County - Samcheok - Donghae

== Major intersections ==
- (■): Motorway

IS: Intersection, IC: Interchange

=== North Gyeongsang Province ===
Name	Hangul name	Connection	Location		Note
Bonghyeon IS	봉현 교차로	National Route 5 (Jungnyeong-ro); Prefectural Route 931 (Sobaek-ro)	Yeongju City	Bonghyeon-myeon	Terminus; Prefectural Route 931 overlap
Bonghyeon-myeon Office	봉현면사무소	Ohyeon-ro	Yeongju City	Bonghyeon-myeon	Prefectural Route 931 overlap
Bonghyeon IS	봉현사거리	Sinjae-ro; Ohyeon-ro	Yeongju City	Bonghyeon-myeon	Prefectural Route 931 overlap
Punggi Bridge	풍기교		Yeongju City	Bonghyeon-myeon	Prefectural Route 931 overlap
Punggi Bridge			Yeongju City	Punggi-eup	Prefectural Route 931 overlap
Seongnae-ri	성내리	Giju-ro	Yeongju City	Punggi-eup	Prefectural Route 931 overlap
(Punggi IS)	(풍기오거리)	Dongseong-ro; Dongseong-ro 94beon-gil	Yeongju City	Punggi-eup	Prefectural Route 931 overlap
(Punggi Seobu Underpass)	(풍기서부지하도)	Geumgye-ro	Yeongju City	Punggi-eup	Prefectural Route 931 overlap
Geumgye Bridge Dongyang University	금계교 동양대학교		Yeongju City	Punggi-eup	Prefectural Route 931 overlap
Dongyang University IS	동양대삼거리	Sobaek-ro	Yeongju City	Punggi-eup	Prefectural Route 931 overlap
Punggi Ginseng Market	풍기인삼도매시장		Yeongju City	Punggi-eup	Prefectural Route 931 overlap
Taejang 1 IS	태장1 교차로	Daepyeong-ro; Taejang-ro	Yeongju City	Sunheung-myeon	Prefectural Route 931 overlap
Yeongju Bicycle Race School Garang Pass	영주경륜수련원 가랑고개		Yeongju City	Sunheung-myeon	Prefectural Route 931 overlap
Taejang 2 IS	태장2 교차로	Sobaek-ro 2481beon-gil	Yeongju City	Sunheung-myeon	Prefectural Route 931 overlap
Sunheung IS	순흥 교차로	Hoehyeon-ro; Sunheung-ro 55beon-gil	Yeongju City	Sunheung-myeon	Prefectural Route 931 overlap
Eupnae IS	읍내사거리	Sunheung-ro; Jukgye-ro	Yeongju City	Sunheung-myeon	Prefectural Route 931 overlap
Sosu Seowon Jewol Bridge Seonbichon	소수서원 제월교 선비촌		Yeongju City	Sunheung-myeon	Prefectural Route 931 overlap
Naegijae	내기재		Yeongju City	Sunheung-myeon	Prefectural Route 931 overlap
Naegijae			Yeongju City	Dansan-myeon	Prefectural Route 931 overlap
Dangok Bridge Okdae Bridge	단곡교 옥대교		Yeongju City	Dansan-myeon	Prefectural Route 931 overlap
Okdae IS	옥대삼거리	Danssan-ro; Okdae-ro	Yeongju City	Dansan-myeon	Prefectural Route 931 overlap
(Roundabout)	(회전교차로)	Okdae-ro	Yeongju City	Dansan-myeon	Prefectural Route 931 overlap
Socheon IS	소천사거리	Prefectural Route 935 (Uisang-ro); Socheon-ro	Yeongju City	Buseok-myeon	Prefectural Route 931, 935 overlap
Buseok Bridge	부석교		Yeongju City	Buseok-myeon	Prefectural Route 931, 935 overlap
Buseok Roundabout	부석 회전교차로	Prefectural Route 931 (Sobaek-ro)	Yeongju City	Buseok-myeon	Prefectural Route 931, 935 overlap
Dubong Bridge	두봉교	Buseoksa-ro	Yeongju City	Buseok-myeon	Prefectural Route 935 overlap
Yeongju Sobaeksan Arts Village (Former Buseok Bukbu Elementary School)	영주소백산예술촌 (구 부석북부초등학교)		Yeongju City	Buseok-myeon	Prefectural Route 935 overlap
Magyryeong	마구령		Yeongju City	Buseok-myeon	Prefectural Route 935 overlap Elevation: 820m
Namdae Bridge Buseok Bukbu Elementary School Namdae Branch (Closed)	남대교 부석북부초등학교 남대분교(폐교)		Yeongju City	Buseok-myeon	Prefectural Route 935 overlap Continuation into North Chungcheong Province

=== North Chungcheong Province ===
Name	Hangul name	Connection	Location		Note
Uipung 3 Bridge Uipung 1 Bridge Yeongchun Elementary School Uipung Branch	의풍3교 의풍1교 영춘초등학교 의풍분교		Danyang County	Yeongchun-myeon	Prefectural Route 935 overlap North Gyeongsang Province - North Chungcheong Province border line
(Uipung 1-ri)	(의풍1리)	Prefectural Route 935 (Yeongbu-ro)	Danyang County	Yeongchun-myeon	Prefectural Route 935 overlap
(Norumok)	(노루목)		Danyang County	Yeongchun-myeon	Continuation into Gangwon Province

=== Gangwon Province ===
Name	Hangul name	Connection	Location		Note
(Norumok) (Kim Sat Gat Tomb) Kim Satgat Bridge Satgat Bridge Deundol Bridge Waseok 1 Bridge	(노루목) 김삿갓묘 김삿갓교 삿갓교 든돌교 와석1교		Yeongwol County	Gimsatgat-myeon	North Chungcheong Province - Gangwon Province border line
Okdong Elementary School Juseok Branch (Closed)	옥동초등학교 주석분교 (폐교)	Prefectural Route 88 (Yeongwoldong-ro)	Yeongwol County	Gimsatgat-myeon	Prefectural Route 88 overlap
Gokdong Bridge Misa Bridge Oeryong Bridge Oeryong Elementary School (Closed)	곡동교 미사교 외룡교 외룡초등학교 (폐교)		Yeongwol County	Gimsatgat-myeon	Prefectural Route 88 overlap
Naeri Entrance (West Chilyong Bridge)	내리입구 (칠용교 서단)	Prefectural Route 88 (Naerigyegok-ro)	Yeongwol County	Gimsatgat-myeon	Prefectural Route 88 overlap
Nokjeon Middle School Nokjeon Bridge	녹전중학교 녹전대교		Yeongwol County	Jungdong-myeon	
Nokjeon IS	녹전사거리	Taebaeksan-ro; Eunggogae-gil	Yeongwol County	Jungdong-myeon	
Nokjeon Bridge Jungdong-myeon Office	녹전교 중동면사무소		Yeongwol County	Jungdong-myeon	
Imok IS	이목 교차로	National Route 31 (Yeongwol ~ Jungdong Road)	Yeongwol County	Jungdong-myeon	National Route 31 overlap
Garinae IS	가리내 교차로	Taebaeksan-ro	Yeongwol County	Jungdong-myeon	National Route 31 overlap
Sura-ri Tunnel	수라리터널		Yeongwol County	Jungdong-myeon	National Route 31 overlap L= 869m (Surarijae elevation: 600m)
Hwawon IS	화원 교차로	Taebaeksan-ro	Yeongwol County	Jungdong-myeon	National Route 31 overlap
Seokhang IS	석항삼거리	Yeongwol-ro	Yeongwol County	Jungdong-myeon	National Route 31 overlap
Seokhang Bus Stop Yeongwol Elementary School Yeonsang Branch	석항버스정류소 영월초등학교 연상분교		Yeongwol County	Jungdong-myeon	National Route 31 overlap
Seokhang IS (Yeonsang IS)	석항 교차로 (연상삼거리)	National Route 38; National Route 59 (Gangwonnam-ro); Yeongwol-ro	Yeongwol County	Jungdong-myeon	National Route 31 overlap National Route 38, National Route 59 overlap
Seokhang 3 Bridge	석항3교		Yeongwol County	Jungdong-myeon	National Route 38, National Route 59 overlap
Yangji Bridge	양지교		Jeongseon County	Sindong-eup	National Route 38, National Route 59 overlap
Sindong IS	신동 교차로	Prefectural Route 421 (Uirim-ro)	Jeongseon County	Sindong-eup	National Route 38, National Route 59 overlap
Sindong Bridge	신동교		Jeongseon County	Sindong-eup	National Route 38, National Route 59 overlap
Yemi IS	예미 교차로	Donggang-ro; Uirim-ro	Jeongseon County	Sindong-eup	National Route 38, National Route 59 overlap
Uirim IS (Yemi 1 Bridge)	의림삼거리 (예미1교)	Uirim-ro	Jeongseon County	Sindong-eup	National Route 38, National Route 59 overlap
Yemi 2 Bridge	예미2교	Uirim-ro	Jeongseon County	Sindong-eup	National Route 38, National Route 59 overlap
Yemi 3 Bridge Gasa 1 Bridge	예미3교 가사1교		Jeongseon County	Sindong-eup	National Route 38, National Route 59 overlap
Gasa Overpass	가사육교	Uirim-ro	Jeongseon County	Sindong-eup	National Route 38, National Route 59 overlap
Gasa 2 Bridge Gasa 3 Bridge Gasa 4 Bridge	가사2교 가사3교 가사4교		Jeongseon County	Sindong-eup	National Route 38, National Route 59 overlap
Wonpyeong Overpass	원평육교	Uirim-ro	Jeongseon County	Sindong-eup	National Route 38, National Route 59 overlap
Machajae (Macharyeong)	마차재(마차령)		Jeongseon County	Sindong-eup	National Route 38, National Route 59 overlap Elevation: 700m
Machajae (Macharyeong)			Jeongseon County	Nam-myeon	National Route 38, National Route 59 overlap Elevation: 700m
Gwangdeok 1 Bridge Mungok 1 Bridge Mungok 2 Bridge Mungok 4 Bridge Mungok 5 Bridge	광덕1교 문곡1교 문곡2교 문곡3교 문곡4교 문곡5교		Jeongseon County	Nam-myeon	National Route 38, National Route 59 overlap
Mungok IS	문곡 교차로	National Route 59 (Chilhyeon-ro)	Jeongseon County	Nam-myeon	National Route 38, National Route 59 overlap For Yeongwol-bound using Nammyeon IS
Mungok 6 Bridge Mungok 7 Bridge	문곡6교 문곡7교		Jeongseon County	Nam-myeon	National Route 38 overlap
Nammyeon IS	남면 교차로	Muneundan-ro	Jeongseon County	Nam-myeon	National Route 38 overlap
Mureung Bridge	무릉교		Jeongseon County	Nam-myeon	National Route 38 overlap Jeongseon-bound Only
Mindungsan IS	민둥산 교차로	Prefectural Route 421 (Mindungsan-ro); Jamutgol-gil	Jeongseon County	Nam-myeon	National Route 38 overlap
Jeungsan IS	증산 교차로	Mureung 2-ro Jijangcheon-ro	Jeongseon County	Nam-myeon	National Route 38 overlap
Jeungsan Railway Bridge Moksan 1 Bridge	증산과선교 목산1교		Jeongseon County	Nam-myeon	National Route 38 overlap
Jeungsan Tunnel	증산터널		Jeongseon County	Nam-myeon	National Route 38 overlap Right tunnel: Approximately 503m Left tunnel: Approximately 484m
Moksan 2 Bridge	목산2교	Jijangcheon-ro	Jeongseon County	Nam-myeon	National Route 38 overlap
Moksan 3 Bridge	목산3교		Jeongseon County	Nam-myeon	National Route 38 overlap
Moksan 3 Bridge			Jeongseon County	Sabuk-eup	National Route 38 overlap
Moksan 4 Bridge	목산4교		Jeongseon County	Sabuk-eup	National Route 38 overlap
Moksan 4 Bridge			Jeongseon County	Nam-myeon	National Route 38 overlap
Moksan 5 Bridge	목산5교		Jeongseon County	Nam-myeon	National Route 38 overlap
Moksan 5 Bridge			Jeongseon County	Sabuk-eup	National Route 38 overlap
Dosa Bridge Jijangcheon 1 Bridge	도사교 지장천1교		Jeongseon County	Sabuk-eup	National Route 38 overlap
Sabuk IS	사북 교차로	National Route 38 (Gangwonnam-ro); Sabuk 1-gil	Jeongseon County	Sabuk-eup	National Route 38 overlap
Sabuk IS	사북오거리	Sabukjungang-ro; High1-gil	Jeongseon County	Sabuk-eup	
Sabuk Station Sabuk 2 Bridge	사북역 사북2교		Jeongseon County	Sabuk-eup	
Sabuk 2 Bridge IS	사북2교삼거리	Sabukjungang-ro	Jeongseon County	Sabuk-eup	
Jeongseon County Medical Center IS	정선군립병원삼거리	Jijangcheon-ro	Jeongseon County	Sabuk-eup	
Sabuk Middle School Sabuk High School Sabuk Elementary School	사북중학교 사북고등학교 사북초등학교		Jeongseon County	Sabuk-eup	
Beombawi 1 Bridge	범바위1교	Bugiran-gil	Jeongseon County	Sabuk-eup	
Beombawi 1 Bridge Beombawi 2 Bridge	범바위1교 범바위2교		Jeongseon County	Sabuk-eup	
Noreun Bridge	노른교	Noreungari-gil	Jeongseon County	Sabuk-eup	
Nonamujae Tunnel	노나무재터널		Jeongseon County	Sabuk-eup	L= 600m
Nonamujae Tunnel			Jeongseon County	Hwaam-myeon	L= 600m
Baekjeon 2-ri	백전2리	Yongso-gil	Jeongseon County	Hwaam-myeon	
Baekjeon Bridge	백전교		Jeongseon County	Hwaam-myeon	
Baekjeon 1 Bridge	백전1교	Daejisan-gil	Jeongseon County	Hwaam-myeon	
Hapsu Bridge	합수교		Jeongseon County	Hwaam-myeon	
Hapsugeori	합수거리	Prefectural Route 424 (Sogeumgang-ro)	Jeongseon County	Hwaam-myeon	Prefectural Route 424 overlap
Yeokdun Bridge	역둔교	Yeokdun-gil	Samcheok City	Hajang-myeon	Prefectural Route 424 overlap
Hajang Elementary School Yeokdun Branch	하장초등학교 역둔분교		Samcheok City	Hajang-myeon	Prefectural Route 424 overlap
Hajang-myeon Office Yeokdun Branch	하장면사무소 역둔출장소	Prefectural Route 424 (Yeokdunwondong-ro)	Samcheok City	Hajang-myeon	Prefectural Route 424 overlap
Dunjeon Bridge	둔전교		Samcheok City	Hajang-myeon	
Odujae	오두재		Samcheok City	Hajang-myeon	Elevation: 879m
Chudong 2 Bridge Chudong 1 Bridge	추동2교 추동1교		Samcheok City	Hajang-myeon	
Jangjeon IS	장전삼거리	National Route 35 (Baekdudaegan-ro)	Samcheok City	Hajang-myeon	National Route 35 overlap
Gwangdong Bridge Hajang High School Hajang Middle School	광동교 하장고등학교 하장중학교		Samcheok City	Hajang-myeon	National Route 35 overlap
Gwangdong IS	광동삼거리	Hajang-gil	Samcheok City	Hajang-myeon	National Route 35 overlap
Gwangdong Dam	광동댐		Samcheok City	Hajang-myeon	National Route 35 overlap
Sukam IS	숙암삼거리	National Route 35 (Baekdudaegan-ro)	Samcheok City	Hajang-myeon	National Route 35 overlap
Beoncheon Bridge	번천교		Samcheok City	Hajang-myeon	
Daetjae	댓재		Samcheok City	Hajang-myeon	Elevation: 810m
Daetjae			Samcheok City	Miro-myeon	Elevation: 810m
Sangsajeon IS	상사전삼거리	Yeonggyeong-ro	Samcheok City	Miro-myeon	
Hageono IS	하거노삼거리	Gangwonambu-ro	Samcheok City	Miro-myeon	
Hajeong 2 Bridge	하정2교	Dongsan-gil	Samcheok City	Miro-myeon	
Hajeong 1 Bridge	하정1교		Samcheok City	Miro-myeon	
Hajeong IS	하정 교차로	National Route 38 (Gangwonnambu-ro)	Samcheok City	Miro-myeon	National Route 38 overlap
Hajeong Bridge Sanggeono Bridge	하정교 상거노교		Samcheok City	Miro-myeon	National Route 38 overlap
Miro IS	미로 교차로	Mirogangbyeon-ro	Samcheok City	Miro-myeon	National Route 38 overlap
Miro Bridge	미로교		Samcheok City	Miro-myeon	National Route 38 overlap
Musa Bridge	무사교		Samcheok City	Miro-myeon	National Route 38 overlap
Musa Bridge			Samcheok City	Seongnae-dong	National Route 38 overlap
Mapyeong 1 Bridge Mapyeong 2 Bridge	마평1교 마평2교		Samcheok City	Seongnae-dong	National Route 38 overlap
Dogyeong IS	도경 교차로	Gangwonnambu-ro; Osipcheon-ro	Samcheok City	Seongnae-dong	National Route 38 overlap
Samcheok City Public Cemetery	삼척시공설묘지		Samcheok City	Seongnae-dong	National Route 38 overlap
Sky Garden City Cemetery	하늘정원시립묘지		Donghae City	Bukpyeong-dong	National Route 38 overlap
Danbong IS	단봉삼거리	National Route 7 (Donghae-daero)	Donghae City	Bukpyeong-dong	Terminus; National Route 38 overlap

== See also ==
- Roads and expressways in South Korea
- Transportation in South Korea
