= Uiryeong County =

Coordinates: 35°19′09″N 128°15′40″E

Uiryeong
- County
- Panoramic view of Uiryeong-eup

- Flag Emblem of Uiryeong

- Location in South Korea
- Country: South Korea
- Region: Yeongnam
- Administrative divisions: 1 eup, 12 myeon

Area
  - Total: 482.95 km^{2} (186.47 sq mi)

Population (September 2024)
  - Total: 25,168
  - Density: 67/km^{2} (170/sq mi)
  - Dialect: Gyeongsang

Korean name
- Hangul: 의령군
- Hanja: 宜寧郡
- RR: Uiryeong-gun
- MR: Ŭiryŏng-gun

Uiryeong County (Korean: 의령군) is a county in South Gyeongsang Province, South Korea.

Uiryeong County has a population of 27,550 (2019) and is one of the least populated counties in South Korea.

== History ==
=== Early history ===
No presence of Neolithic artefacts have been confirmed, however Bronze Age artefacts such as tombstones have been found in the region. The region is thought to have been in the domain of Aragaya (modern day Haman County) and the Bisabeol (modern day Changnyeong County) region, during the Three Kingdoms period in Korea, and is thought to have been under the influence of the Kingdom of Silla, after the province of Haju (下州, 하주) was installed in the region of Changnyeong in 555 (under King Jinheung of Silla). The region was also known as Jangham prefecture (獐含縣, 장함현) under Silla, but the prefecture's name was changed to Uiryeong in 757 (under King Gyeongdeok of Silla), and became kind of a subprefecture under Haman prefecture. The Sinban (新反, 신반) region, then also known as Sinui prefecture (辛尒縣, 신이현), Juo township (朱烏村, 주오촌, directly translated as "town of the red raven") or Cheoncheon prefecture (泉川縣, 천천현, directly translated as the "prefecture of the spring streams"), became the subprefecture in the domains of Gangyang County (江陽郡,강양군, modern day Hapcheon County) with the new name "Uisang prefecture" (宜桑縣, 의상현).

=== Medieval history ===
In 1018 (under the Goryeo Dynasty), Uiryeong came under the domain of Jinjumok (晋州牧) and a high official called Gammu was appointed in the region in the year 1390. Uisang prefecture initially went through a name change as Sinbeon prefecture, and was part of Hapju, but it became part of the domain of Uiryeong prefecture in 1390. In 1413, the post of Gammu was abolished, and post of hyeongam was dispatched to the region instead. According to statistics during the reign of King Sejong, there were 504 houses in the Uiryeong region, with a population of 1629, and the Sinbeon region had 555 houses with population of AD 982.

=== Modern history ===
The region was the center of a righteous army led by general Gwak Jae-u, who rose up as a reaction to the Korean Japanese war of 1592.

==== 19th century ====
Uiryeong-gun (1899)

As part of an administrative division change, the region became part of Jinjubu as Uiryeong County in 1895, but it became part of South Gyeongsang province in 1896.

==== 20th century ====
During the Japanese colonial era, the county was called Ginei and was a part of the now-defunct Keishōnan Province.

The administrative division changed in 1914, which involved merging Gungryumyeon of Hapcheon County, which made Uiryeong County contain 13 myeons.

On March 14, 1919, a protest broke out in Uiryeong myeon, and protest was part of an independence movement. The protest went on for 3 days.

In 1938, Lee Byung-chull, a resident of Uiryeong, founded Samsung in the nearby city of Taikyu (now Daegu).

During the Korean War in the 1950s, the region was devastated by Communist attacks.

On the evening of 26 April 1982, policeman Woo Bum-kon went on a shooting and bombing rampage through several villages in Uiryeong County, killing 56 people and wounding around 35 others in the worst non-terrorist spree killing in history.

== Climate ==
Climate data for Uiryeong (2011–2020 normals, extremes 2010–present)
Month	Jan	Feb	Mar	Apr	May	Jun	Jul	Aug	Sep	Oct	Nov	Dec	Year
Record high °C (°F)	18.1 (64.6)	24.6 (76.3)	25.0 (77.0)	30.0 (86.0)	36.0 (96.8)	35.1 (95.2)	38.7 (101.7)	38.3 (100.9)	36.5 (97.7)	31.3 (88.3)	28.5 (83.3)	20.0 (68.0)	38.7 (101.7)
Mean daily maximum °C (°F)	7.2 (45.0)	9.7 (49.5)	15.3 (59.5)	20.3 (68.5)	26.2 (79.2)	28.2 (82.8)	30.1 (86.2)	31.1 (88.0)	26.3 (79.3)	21.8 (71.2)	15.6 (60.1)	8.5 (47.3)	20.0 (68.0)
Daily mean °C (°F)	−0.3 (31.5)	2.3 (36.1)	7.7 (45.9)	12.9 (55.2)	18.6 (65.5)	22.2 (72.0)	25.4 (77.7)	25.7 (78.3)	20.3 (68.5)	14.2 (57.6)	8.1 (46.6)	1.2 (34.2)	13.2 (55.8)
Mean daily minimum °C (°F)	−6.4 (20.5)	−4.1 (24.6)	0.6 (33.1)	5.7 (42.3)	11.5 (52.7)	17.3 (63.1)	21.6 (70.9)	21.6 (70.9)	15.8 (60.4)	8.6 (47.5)	2.3 (36.1)	−4.5 (23.9)	7.5 (45.5)
Record low °C (°F)	−17.1 (1.2)	−14.5 (5.9)	−8.8 (16.2)	−3.5 (25.7)	1.7 (35.1)	9.2 (48.6)	14.2 (57.6)	13.5 (56.3)	7.0 (44.6)	−2.0 (28.4)	−6.3 (20.7)	−12.8 (9.0)	−17.4 (0.7)
Average precipitation mm (inches)	22.5 (0.89)	34.7 (1.37)	73.5 (2.89)	118.4 (4.66)	88.0 (3.46)	121.5 (4.78)	267.2 (10.52)	254.4 (10.02)	188.4 (7.42)	109.7 (4.32)	48.1 (1.89)	28.6 (1.13)	1,355 (53.35)
Average precipitation days (≥ 0.1 mm)	4.2	5.3	7.7	9.4	9.3	9.8	15.0	13.8	10.8	6.3	7.0	5.1	103.7
Average relative humidity (%)	64.1	61.0	61.5	63.9	66.7	75.2	83.0	83.8	85.1	80.4	76.4	68.2	72.4
Mean monthly sunshine hours	198.3	188.1	225.6	211.8	212.8	169.0	148.7	170.2	149.8	193.9	167.2	187.7	2,223.1
Source: Korea Meteorological Administration

== Transportation ==
Uiryeong has a convenient location as it sits between Jinju to the west and Haman/Masan/Changwon to the East. A bus runs regularly from the bus terminal in Uiryeong-Eup to all major cities in South Korea. A bus journey to Masan or Jinju takes approximately 35 minutes and 45 minutes respectively from Uiryeong bus terminal, while the journey to Busan takes 1 hour. It is also possible to take a bus directly to Seoul from Uiryeong.

The biggest problem in terms of transportation is that the intercity buses stop running to Uiryeong from the nearby cities fairly early in the evening. The last bus from Busan is 6:40 PM, from Jinju, it's 7:30 PM and from Masan, it's 9:00 PM.

== Sister cities ==
Uiryeong is twinned with:

- Sacheon, South Korea
- Muan, South Korea
- Yongsan-gu, South Korea
- Uiseong, South Korea
- Liaocheng, China
- Mandal, Mongolia

== See also ==
- Yeongnam
- Administrative divisions of South Korea
- Geography of South Korea
