= Hapcheon County =

Coordinates: 35°33′59″N 128°09′58″E

Hapcheon
- County
- Panoramic view of Hapcheon-eup

- Flag Emblem of Hapcheon

- Location in South Korea
- Country: South Korea
- Region: Yeongnam
- Administrative divisions: 1 eup, 16 myeon

Area
  - Total: 983.42 km^{2} (379.70 sq mi)

Population (September 2024)
  - Total: 40,440
  - Density: 61.2/km^{2} (159/sq mi)
  - Dialect: Gyeongsang

Korean name
- Hangul: 합천군
- Hanja: 陜川郡
- RR: Hapcheon-gun
- MR: Hapch'ŏn-gun

Hapcheon County (Korean: 합천군) is a county in South Gyeongsang Province, South Korea.

Located in northwestern South Gyeongsang Province, the county is surrounded by Changnyeong as well as Euiryeong to the Southeast, Geochang as well as Sancheong-gun to the West. High and precipitous hills are densely situated and the eastern part is flatter by the flowing streams of the Nakdong River.

Famous people born in the county include former South Korean president Chun Doo-hwan.

== Places of interest ==
Haeinsa is a famous temple located in Hapcheon county. There is a Tripitaka Koreana in Haeinsa Temple.

Mt. Namsan Jeilbong is known for its climbing trails year-round views. Its address is Chiin-li, Gaya-myun, Hapcheon, Gyeongnam.

== Special products ==
Paprika is a popular agriculture good cultivated on the highlands of Mt. Gaya during the summer season. It is hence called Gaya paprika. This paprika is often exported to Japan.

== Tourism ==
Hapcheon has a video theme park. It is a set set from the 1920s to the 1990s. In the summer, it operates as a ghost park.

Hapcheon lake is also a tourist spot bordering Sancheong county. It is an artificial lake generated by the comprehensive development plan of Nakdong River in 1988. It also meets Hwangmae mountain which is possible to climb and from the peak, there are views of the lake.

Paragliding is also possible in Hapcheon. There were people killed during the county paragliding championship in 2007.

== Climate ==
As Hapcheon-gun is landlocked, the climate is quite extreme. Average annual temperature is 13.0 °C with the lowest temperature of -16.9 °C (in 1974) and the highest of 39.2 °C (in 1994). The rainfall is approximately 1275.6mm which is quite low compared to other Korean regions. The rainfall is heaviest in the summer.

Climate data for Hapcheon (1991–2020 normals, extremes 1973–present)
Month	Jan	Feb	Mar	Apr	May	Jun	Jul	Aug	Sep	Oct	Nov	Dec	Year
Record high °C (°F)	17.7 (63.9)	24.4 (75.9)	27.8 (82.0)	31.8 (89.2)	36.2 (97.2)	36.6 (97.9)	39.5 (103.1)	39.2 (102.6)	36.6 (97.9)	30.9 (87.6)	26.4 (79.5)	20.5 (68.9)	39.5 (103.1)
Mean daily maximum °C (°F)	7.0 (44.6)	9.7 (49.5)	14.6 (58.3)	20.7 (69.3)	25.6 (78.1)	28.5 (83.3)	30.4 (86.7)	31.1 (88.0)	27.1 (80.8)	22.3 (72.1)	15.6 (60.1)	9.0 (48.2)	20.1 (68.2)
Daily mean °C (°F)	−0.2 (31.6)	2.2 (36.0)	7.3 (45.1)	13.2 (55.8)	18.2 (64.8)	22.2 (72.0)	25.3 (77.5)	25.6 (78.1)	20.9 (69.6)	14.5 (58.1)	7.8 (46.0)	1.7 (35.1)	13.2 (55.8)
Mean daily minimum °C (°F)	−5.9 (21.4)	−4.1 (24.6)	0.5 (32.9)	5.8 (42.4)	11.3 (52.3)	16.8 (62.2)	21.4 (70.5)	21.5 (70.7)	16.2 (61.2)	8.7 (47.7)	2.0 (35.6)	−4.0 (24.8)	7.5 (45.5)
Record low °C (°F)	−16.9 (1.6)	−16.7 (1.9)	−10.1 (13.8)	−4.6 (23.7)	1.7 (35.1)	6.8 (44.2)	12.8 (55.0)	12.2 (54.0)	4.6 (40.3)	−3.6 (25.5)	−9.9 (14.2)	−14.8 (5.4)	−16.9 (1.6)
Average precipitation mm (inches)	19.7 (0.78)	31.3 (1.23)	54.0 (2.13)	81.9 (3.22)	94.1 (3.70)	146.7 (5.78)	289.5 (11.40)	294.8 (11.61)	158.6 (6.24)	64.5 (2.54)	34.7 (1.37)	20.1 (0.79)	1,289.9 (50.78)
Average precipitation days (≥ 0.1 mm)	4.0	4.7	6.8	8.2	8.9	9.7	14.4	14.0	9.5	5.0	5.2	3.9	94.3
Average snowy days	3.2	2.4	1.1	0.1	0.0	0.0	0.0	0.0	0.0	0.0	0.4	2.1	9.3
Average relative humidity (%)	60.5	57.3	56.5	56.2	60.5	66.7	74.3	74.8	74.2	70.6	67.3	62.6	65.1
Mean monthly sunshine hours	182.3	185.3	208.2	213.8	224.7	172.0	147.9	163.7	161.3	190.4	167.7	172.4	2,189.7
Percentage possible sunshine	60.5	60.2	55.4	55.7	52.2	42.2	36.1	42.3	45.9	57.7	56.3	59.9	51.2
Source: Korea Meteorological Administration (snow and percent sunshine 1981–2010)

== Sister cities ==
- Bergen County, New Jersey, United States
- Mitoyo, Kagawa, Japan
- Jangsu, North Jeolla, South Korea
- Xinchang, China

== See also ==
- Geography of South Korea
