= Beonyeong-ro =

Beonyeong-ro (Korean: 번영로) is road name in South Korea.

- Beonyeong-ro (Busan)
- Beonyeong-ro (Gunsan~Jeonju)
- Beonyeong-ro (Ansan~Siheung)
- Beonyeong-ro (Gunpo)
- Beonyeong-ro (Paju)
- Beonyeong-ro (Sokcho)
- Beonyeong-ro (Taebaek)
- Beonyeong-ro (Hongcheon)
- Beonyeong-ro (Nonsan)
- Beonyeong-ro (Boryeong)
- Beonyeong-ro (Asan)
- Beonyeong-ro (Cheonan)
- Beonyeong-ro (Gyeryong)
- Beonyeong-ro (Buan)
- Beonyeong-ro (Mokpo)
- Beonyeong-ro (Yeongju)
- Beonyeong-ro (Yangsan)
- Beonyeong-ro (Jeju)
