= Buramsan Tunnel =

Road tunnel in South Korea

Buramsan Tunnel 불암산터널
- Interactive map of Buramsan Tunnel 불암산터널

Overview
- Line: Seoul Ring Expressway
- Location: Hanam, Gyeonggi Province
- Coordinates: 37°40′20″N 127°5′55.7″E
- Status: Active
- Start: Byeollae-dong, Namyangju, Gyeonggi Province
- End: Sanggye-dong, Nowon-gu, Seoul

Operation
- Opened: 30 June 2006
- Operator: Seoul Beltway

Technical
- Length: Pangyo-bound: 1,685m Ilsan-bound: 1,665m
- No. of lanes: 8
- Operating speed: 100km/h

The Buramsan Tunnel (Korean: 불암산터널) is a road tunnel started at Byeollae-dong, Namyangju, Gyeonggi Province, South Korea and ended at Sanggye-dong, Nowon-gu, Seoul. The tunnel constitutes the Seoul Ring Expressway.

The Suraksan Tunnel lies nearby to the north-westwards of the Bulamsan Tunnel.

== See also ==
- Gwangam Tunnel: Pangyo direction, next tunnel
- Suraksan Tunnel: Guri direction, next tunnel
