= Gwangam Tunnel =

Road tunnel in South Korea

Gwang-am Tunnel 광암터널
- Interactive map of Gwang-am Tunnel 광암터널

Overview
- Line: Seoul Ring Expressway
- Location: Hanam, Gyeonggi Province
- Coordinates: 37°31′1″N 127°10′45″E
- Status: Active
- Start: Gambuk-dong, Hanam, Gyeonggi Province
- End: Chun-gung-dong, Hanam, Gyeonggi Province

Operation
- Opened: Pangyo-bound: 31 October 1991; Guri-bound: 10 December 2002
- Operator: Korea Expressway Corporation

Technical
- Length: Pangyo-bound 1: 743m Pangyo-bound 2: 752m Guri-bound: 726m
- No. of lanes: 8
- Operating speed: 100km/h

The Gwangam Tunnel (광암터널) is a road tunnel located on Hanam, Gyeonggi Province, South Korea. The tunnel constitutes the Seoul Ring Expressway.

The tunnel is constituted of 3 tunnels. 2 tunnels are to Pangyo Junction, and opened to traffic on 31 October 1991. At first, one is to Pangyo, and the other is to Guri. Each tunnels had 2 lanes. But, there was a road-widening project between Pangyo JC and Toegyewon Interchange, and the new tunnel, which has 4 lanes, opened on 10 December 2002. After opening the new tunnel, 2 tunnels, which has 2 lanes, is to Pangyo. And the new tunnel is to Guri.

== See also ==
- Cheonggye Tunnel: Pangyo direction, next tunnel
- Buramsan Tunnel: Guri direction, next tunnel
