= Gyeongbu Expressway =

Expressway in South Korea

Expressway No.1
- Gyeongbu Expressway

Route information
- Part of AH 1
- Length: 416 km (258 mi)
- Existed: 1968–present

Major junctions
- South end: Geumjeong-gu, Busan
- North end: Seocho-gu, Seoul

Location
- Country: South Korea
- Major cities: Yangsan, Ulsan, Gyeongju, Yeongcheon, Gyeongsan, Daegu, Gumi, Gimcheon, Daejeon, Cheongju, Cheonan, Anseong, Osan, Hwaseong, Yongin, Seongnam

Highway system
- Highway systems of South Korea; Expressways; National; Local

- Gyeongbu Expressway
- Hangul: 경부고속도로
- Hanja: 京釜高速道路
- RR: Gyeongbu gosok doro
- MR: Kyŏngbu kosok toro

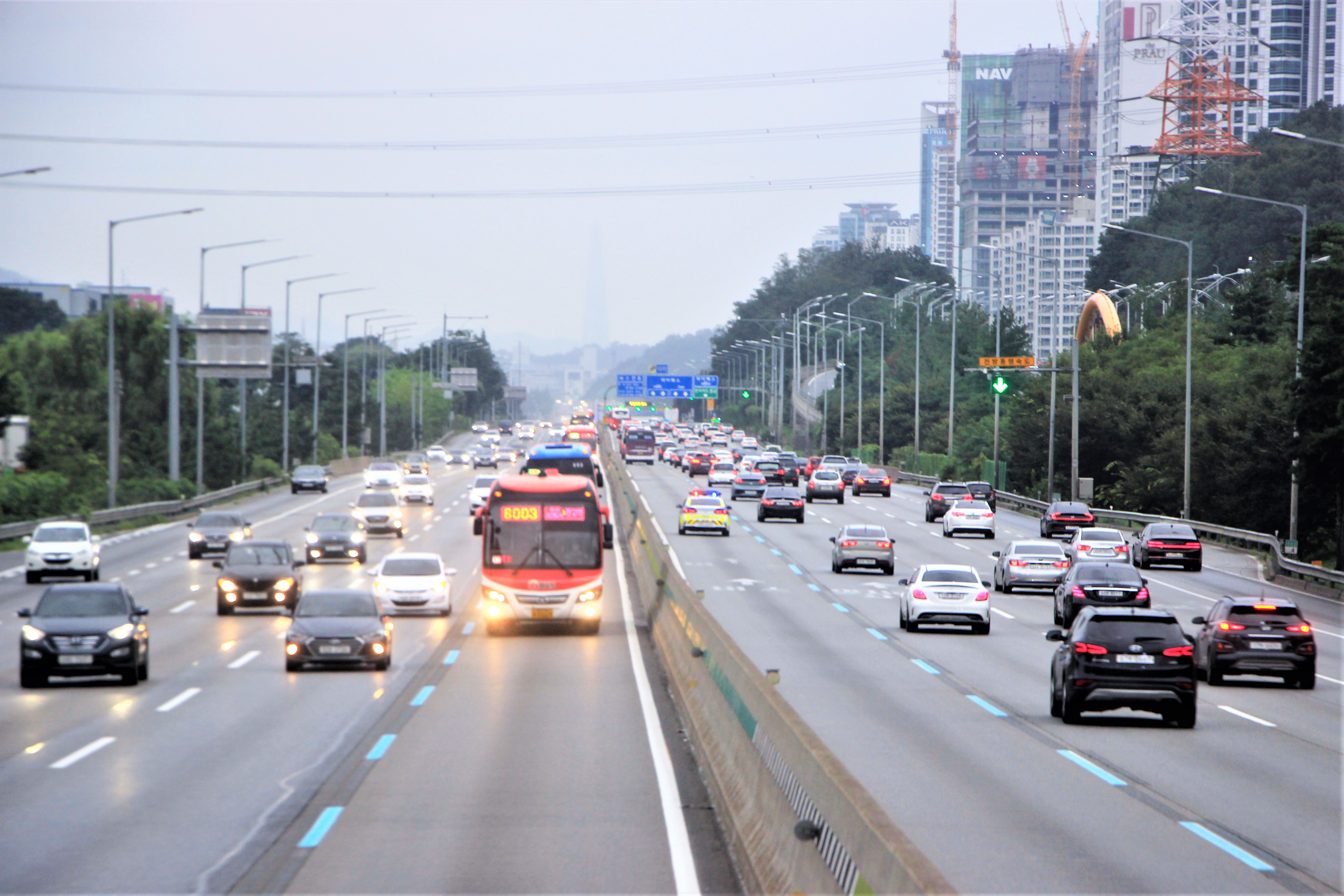
Gyeongbu Expressway in Seongnam, Gyeonggi Province

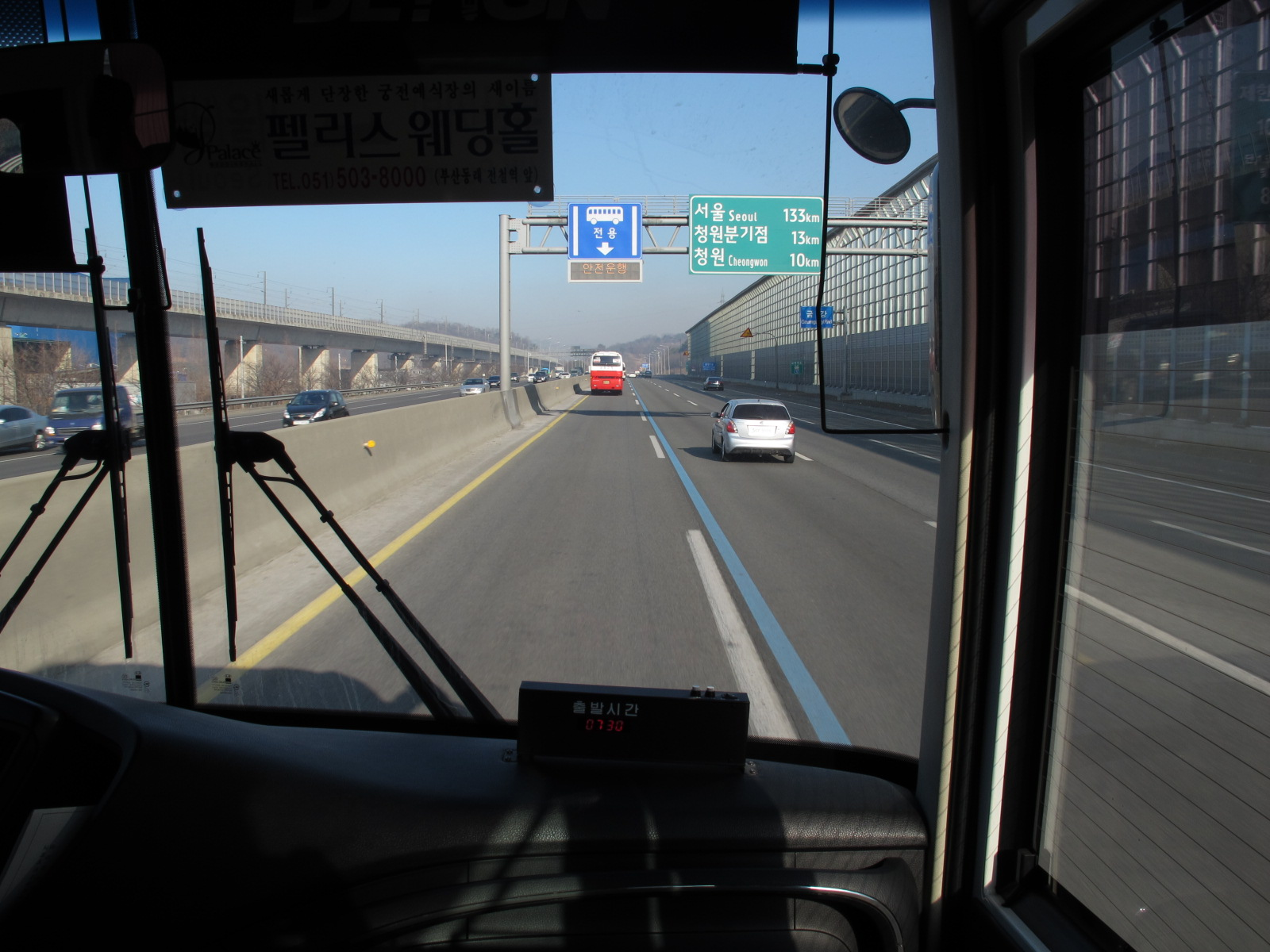
Highway bus lane on Gyeongbu Expressway in Daejeon

The Gyeongbu Expressway (Korean: 경부고속도로; Asian Highway Network AH 1) is the second oldest and most heavily travelled expressway in South Korea, connecting Seoul to Suwon, Daejeon, Gumi, Daegu, Gyeongju, Ulsan and Busan. It has the route number 1, signifying its role as South Korea's most important expressway. The entire length from Seoul to Busan is 416 kilometers (258 mi) and the posted speed limit is usually 110 kilometers per hour (68 mph), enforced primarily by speed cameras.

== History ==
Inspired by the Autobahn during a trip to Germany, South Korean President Park Chung Hee proposed the construction of the Gyeongbu Expressway as an election pledge in 1967.

- February 1968 - Construction begins at the behest of South Korean President Park Chung Hee, who named Park Myung-keun in charge of construction.
- 21 December 1968 - Seoul-Suwon segment opens to traffic.
- 30 December 1968 - Suwon-Osan segment opens to traffic.
- 29 September 1969 - Anseong-Cheonan segment opens to traffic.
- 10 December 1969 - Cheonan-Daejeon segment opens to traffic.
- 19 December 1969 - Busan-Daegu (via Gyeongju) segment opens to traffic.
- 7 July 1970 - The last segment, the mountainous Daejeon-Daegu segment, opens to traffic, completing South Korea's first long-distance limited access expressway.
- December 1987 - Work begins to widen to six lanes in selected areas. Some areas are widened to 8 or 10 lanes by 1996.
- February 1995 - Bus-only lane (essentially an HOV-9) established between the northern terminus and Sintanjin for important holidays.
- 14 July 2000 - Eight vehicles, including three buses and a five-ton truck, collide near Gimcheon, killing 18 and injuring over 100.
- 25 August 2001 - All expressways in South Korea reorganize under a pattern modeled after the United States' Interstate Highway System. The Gyeongbu Expressway's route number of 1 is the only one not to change; however, its kilometer markers change from a north–south progression to south–north.
- December 2002 - Korea National Expressway Corporation passes control of the northernmost 9 km stretch of expressway (between Yangjae and Hannam Bridge) to the City of Seoul.
- 1 July 2008 - Bus lane enforcement between Seoul and Osan (Sintanjin on weekends) becomes daily between 6 AM and 10 PM. On 1 October this is adjusted to 7 AM to 9 PM weekdays, 9 AM to 9 PM weekends.

== Compositions ==
=== Speed limit ===
- Cheonan JC ~ Yangjae IC : 110 km/h
- Guseo IC ~ Cheonan JC : 100 km/h

== List of facilities ==
- IC: Interchange, JC: Junction, SA: Service Area, TG: Tollgate

No.	Name	Hangul Name	Hanja Name	Connections	Notes	Location	
	Busan	부산 시점	釜山 始點	National Route 7 Jungang-daero		Geumjeong	Busan
1	Guseo IC	구서 나들목	久瑞나들목	Beonyeong-ro		Geumjeong	Busan
1-1	Yeongnak IC	영락 나들목	永樂나들목			Geumjeong	Busan
TG	Busan TG	부산 요금소	釜山料金所			Geumjeong	Busan
2	Nopo IC	노포 나들목	老圃나들목	National Route 7		Geumjeong	Busan
2-1	Nopo JC	노포 분기점	老圃分岐點	Busan Ring Expressway		Geumjeong	Busan
SA	Yangsan SA	양산 휴게소	梁山休憩所		Seoul-bound Only	Yangsan	Gyeongnam
3	Yangsan JC	양산 분기점	梁山分岐點	Jungang Expressway Branch		Yangsan	Gyeongnam
4	Yangsan IC	양산 나들목	梁山나들목	National Route 35		Yangsan	Gyeongnam
4-1 SA	Tongdosa Hipass IC; Tongdosa SA	통도사 하이패스 나들목	通度寺 하이패스 나들목	National Route 35	Hi-pass only for Busan-bound	Yangsan	Gyeongnam
5	Tongdosa IC	통도사 나들목	通度寺나들목	National Route 35		Ulju	Ulsan
5-1	W.Ulju JC	서울주 분기점	西蔚州分岐點	Hamyang-Ulsan Expressway		Ulju	Ulsan
6	W.Ulsan IC (Samnam)	서울산 나들목 (삼남)	西蔚山나들목 (三南)	National Route 35		Ulju	Ulsan
7	Eonyang JC	언양 분기점	彦陽分岐點	Ulsan Expressway		Ulju	Ulsan
SA	Eonyang SA	언양 휴게소	彦陽休憩所			Ulju	Ulsan
8	Hwalcheon IC	활천 나들목				Ulju	Ulsan
SA	Gyeongju SA	경주 휴게소	慶州休憩所		Busan-bound Only	Gyeongju	Gyeongbuk
9	Gyeongju IC	경주나들목	慶州나들목	National Route 7 ( AH 6); National Route 35		Gyeongju	Gyeongbuk
SA	Geoncheon SA	건천 휴게소	乾川休憩所		No Gas Station on Busan-bound	Gyeongju	Gyeongbuk
10	W. Gyeongju IC	서경주나들목	西慶州나들목	National Route 20		Gyeongju	Gyeongbuk
10-1	Yeongcheon JC	영천 분기점	永川分岐點	Yeongcheon–Sangju Expressway		Yeongcheon	Gyeongbuk
11	Yeongcheon IC	영천 나들목	永川나들목	National Route 4		Yeongcheon	Gyeongbuk
SA	Pyeongsa SA	평사 휴게소	坪沙休憩所		Busan-bound only	Gyeongsan	Gyeongbuk
SA	Gyeongsan SA	경산 휴게소	慶山休憩所		Seoul-bound only	Gyeongsan	Gyeongbuk
12	Gyeongsan IC	경산 나들목	慶山나들목	Local Route 919		Gyeongsan	Gyeongbuk
13	E.Daegu JC	동대구 분기점	東大邱分岐點	Jungang Expressway		Dong-gu	Daegu
14	Dodong JC	도동 분기점	道洞分岐點	Iksan-Pohang Expressway		Dong-gu	Daegu
16	N.Daegu IC	북대구 나들목	北大邱나들목	National Route 4 National Route 5 Sincheon-daero; Seobyeonnam-ro		Buk-gu	Daegu
17	Geumho JC	금호 분기점	琴湖分岐點	Jungang Expressway; Jungbu Naeryuk Expressway Branch		Buk-gu	Daegu
17-1	Chilgok JC	칠곡 분기점	漆谷分岐點	Daegu Ring Expressway		Chilgok	Gyeongbuk
18	Chilgok Logistics IC	칠곡물류 나들목	漆谷物流나들목	National Route 4		Chilgok	Gyeongbuk
19	Waegwan IC	왜관 나들목	倭館나들목	National Route 4 Local Route 79		Chilgok	Gyeongbuk
SA	Chilgok SA	칠곡 휴게소	漆谷休憩所			Chilgok	Gyeongbuk
20	S.Gumi IC	남구미 나들목	南龜尾나들목	National Route 33		Gumi	Gyeongbuk
21	Gumi IC	구미 나들목	龜尾나들목	National Route 33		Gumi	Gyeongbuk
21-1	N.Gumi IC	북구미 나들목	北龜尾나들목			Gumi	Gyeongbuk
22	Gimcheon JC	김천 분기점	金泉分岐點	Jungbu Naeryuk Expressway		Gimcheon	Gyeongbuk
22-1	E.Gimcheon IC	동김천 나들목	東金泉나들목	National Route 3		Gimcheon	Gyeongbuk
SA	Gimcheon SA	김천 휴게소	金泉休憩所			Gimcheon	Gyeongbuk
23	Gimcheon IC	김천 나들목	金泉나들목	National Route 4		Gimcheon	Gyeongbuk
SA	Chupungnyeong SA	추풍령 휴게소	秋風嶺休憩所			Gimcheon	Gyeongbuk
24	Chupungnyeong IC	추풍령 나들목	秋風嶺나들목	National Route 4	in Chupungnyeong SA	Gimcheon	Gyeongbuk
25	Hwanggan IC	황간 나들목	黃澗나들목	National Route 4		Yeongdong	Chungbuk
SA	Hwanggan SA	황간 휴게소	黃澗休憩所			Yeongdong	Chungbuk
26	Yeongdong IC	영동 나들목	永同나들목	National Route 4		Yeongdong	Chungbuk
SA	Geumgang SA	금강 휴게소	錦江休憩所			Okcheon	Chungbuk
27	Geumgang IC	금강 나들목	錦江나들목	National Route 4	in Geumgang SA	Okcheon	Chungbuk
SA	Okcheon SA	옥천 휴게소	沃川休憩所			Okcheon	Chungbuk
28	Okcheon IC	옥천 나들목	沃川나들목	National Route 4		Okcheon	Chungbuk
29	Biryong JC	비룡 분기점	飛龍分岐點	Tongyeong-Daejeon Expressway; Daejeon Southern Ring Expressway		Dong-gu	Daejeon
30	Daejeon IC	대전 나들목	大田나들목	National Route 17; Korail; Daejeon Station		Daedeok-gu	Daejeon
31	Hoedeok JC	회덕 분기점	懷德分岐點	Seosan–Yeongdeok Expressway; Honam Expressway Branch		Daedeok-gu	Daejeon
31-1 SA	Sangseo IC; Sintanjin SA	신탄진 휴게소	新灘津休憩所		Hi-pass only Seoul-bound only	Daedeok-gu	Daejeon
32	Sintanjin IC	신탄진 나들목	新灘津나들목	National Route 17		Daedeok-gu	Daejeon
SA	Jugam SA	죽암 휴게소	竹岩休憩所			Cheongju	Chungbuk
33	S.Cheongju IC	남청주 나들목	南淸州 나들목	National Route 17; Cheongnamdae; Daecheong Lake		Cheongju	Chungbuk
34	Cheongju JC	청주 분기점	淸州分岐點	Seosan–Yeongdeok Expressway		Cheongju	Chungbuk
35	Nami JC	남이 분기점	南二分岐點	Jungbu Expressway		Cheongju	Chungbuk
36	Cheongju IC	청주 나들목	淸州나들목	National Route 36		Cheongju	Chungbuk
SA 36-1	Oksan SA; Oksan IC	옥산 휴게소 옥산 나들목	玉山休憩所 玉山나들목	Local Route 507; Local Route 508	Busan-bound only Hi-pass only	Cheongju	Chungbuk
36-2	Oksan JC	옥산 분기점	玉山分岐點	Asan-Cheongju Expressway		Cheongju	Chungbuk
SA	Cheongju SA	청주 휴게소	淸州休憩所		Seoul-bound only	Cheongju	Chungbuk
SA	Cheonan Walnut SA	천안호두휴게소	天安核桃休憩所		Busan-bound only	Cheonan	Chungnam
37	Mokcheon IC	목천 나들목	木川나들목	National Route 21; Independence Hall of Korea		Cheonan	Chungnam
38	Cheonan JC	천안 분기점	天安分岐點	Nonsan-Cheonan Expressway		Cheonan	Chungnam
SA	Cheonansamgeori SA	천안삼거리 휴게소	天安三거리休憩所		Seoul-bound Only	Cheonan	Chungnam
39	Cheonan IC	천안 나들목	天安나들목	National Route 1 Local Route 23; Dujeong Station; Cheonan Station		Cheonan	Chungnam
SA	Manghyang SA	망향 휴게소	望鄕休憩所		Busan-bound Only	Cheonan	Chungnam
39-1	N.Cheonan IC	북천안 나들목	北天安나들목	National Route 34		Cheonan	Chungnam
SA	Ipjang Geobong Grape SA	입장 휴게소	笠場休憩所		Seoul-bound Only	Cheonan	Chungnam
40	Anseong IC	안성 나들목	安城나들목	National Route 38		Anseong	Gyeonggi
SA	Anseong SA	안성 휴게소	安城休憩所		Busan-bound Only	Anseong	Gyeonggi
41	Anseong JC	안성 분기점	安城分岐點	Pyeongtaek–Jecheon Expressway		Anseong	Gyeonggi
SA	Anseong SA	안성 휴게소	安城休憩所		Seoul-bound Only	Anseong	Gyeonggi
41-1	Namsa-Jinwi IC	남사진위 나들목	南四振威나들목	Local Route 23	Busan-bound Only	Pyeongtaek	Gyeonggi
42	Osan IC	오산 나들목	烏山나들목	National Route 1		Osan	Gyeonggi
42-1	Dongtan JC	동탄 분기점	東灘分岐點	Capital Region 2nd Ring Expressway; Pyeongtaek–Paju Expressway		Hwaseong	Gyeonggi
43	Giheung-Dongtan IC	기흥동탄나들목	器興東灘나들목	National Route 43; Samsung Electronics (Giheung Campus)		Suwon	Gyeonggi
43	Giheung IC	기흥나들목	器興나들목	National Route 43	Seoul-bound only	Yongin	Gyeonggi
SA	Giheung SA	기흥 휴게소	器興休憩所		Busan-bound only	Yongin	Gyeonggi
44	Suwon·Singal IC	수원신갈 나들목	水原新葛나들목	National Route 42		Yongin	Gyeonggi
45	Singal JC	신갈 분기점	新葛分岐點	Yeongdong Expressway		Yongin	Gyeonggi
SA	Jukjeon SA	죽전 휴게소	竹田休憩所		Seoul-bound Only	Yongin	Gyeonggi
TG	Seoul TG	서울 요금소	서울料金所			Seongnam	Gyeonggi
47	Pangyo IC	판교 나들목	板橋나들목	Local Route 23	Busan-bound Only	Seongnam	Gyeonggi
48	Pangyo JC	판교 분기점	板橋分岐點	Seoul Ring Expressway		Seongnam	Gyeonggi
48	Daewang-Pangyo IC	대왕판교 나들목	大往板橋나들목	Local Route 23	Busan-bound Only; Small Car Only	Seongnam	Gyeonggi
48-1	Geumto JC	금토 분기점	金土分岐點	Yongin-Seoul Expressway		Seongnam	Gyeonggi
SA	Seoul Underground Rendezvous SA	서울 만남의 광장 휴게소	서울 만남의 廣場 休憩所		Busan-bound Only	Seocho	Seoul
49	Yangjae IC	양재 나들목	良才나들목	National Route 47; Yangjae Citizen's Forest station		Seocho	Seoul
	Seoul	서울 종점	서울 終點	Yangjae-Hannam Motorway		Seocho	Seoul

== Gyeongbu Urban Expressway ==
Seoul Special Metropolitan City Route 06
- Gyeongbu Urban Expressway 경부간선도로 서울특별시도 제06호선
- Location: Seocho-Gangnam, Seoul
- Length: 6.86 km (4.26 mi)

In the past, this section was a part of Gyeongbu Expressway, but in 2002 the Seoul Metropolitan Government has takes control of this segment from Korea Expressway Corporation. As a results, this expressway became a part of Seoul Special Metropolitan Route 06. However, the name remains the same, on Traffic Broadcasting System, it is still called Gyeongbu Expressway or the name "Sigugan", and this section is also designated as Asian Highway 1.

=== Main stopovers ===
- Seoul
  - Seocho District - Gangnam District

=== Speed limit ===
- Maximum 80 km/h
- Minimum: 50 km/h

No.	Name	Hangul name	Distance	Total distance	Connection	Location		Notes
Directly connected with Gyeongbu Expressway
49	Yangjae	양재	-	0.00	Gyeongbu Expressway; National Route 47 (Yangjae-daero); Yangjae-daero 12-gil Seoul City Route 41 (Heolleung-ro)	Seoul	Seocho District	
50	Seocho	서초	2.56	2.56	Seoul City Route 92 (Nambu Beltway)	Seoul	Seocho District	
51	Banpo	반포	2.28	4.84	Sapyeong-daero	Seoul	Seocho District	
52	Jamwon	잠원	0.74	5.58	Sinbanpo-ro	Seoul	Seocho District	
53	Hannamdaegyo Br.	한남대교분기점	1.28	6.86	Hannam-daero; Seoul City Route 41 (Gangnam-daero); Seoul City Route 88 (Olympic-daero); Apgujeong-ro·Jamwon-ro	Seoul	Gangnam District	
Connected with Gangnam-daero

== See also ==
- Roads and expressways in South Korea
- Transport in South Korea
