= Tongyeong Interchange =

- 통영 나들목, 統營나들목

Location
- Yongnam-myeon, Tongyeong, South Gyeongsang, South Korea
- Coordinates: 34°52′00″N 128°26′34″E
- Roads at junction: Tongyeong–Daejeon Expressway; Namhaean-daero (National Route 14 & Gukjido 58)

Construction
- Type: Trumpet
- Constructed: by Korea Expressway Corporation
- Opened: 12 December 2005

Tongyeong Interchange (Korean: 통영 나들목; Hanja: 統營나들목), shortly Tongyeong IC, is an interchange located in Yongnam-myeon, Tongyeong, South Gyeongsang, South Korea. Tongyeong–Daejeon Expressway (No. 35) and Namhaean-daero, part of National Route 14 and Gukjido 58, meet here. The type of interchange is trumpet.

== Roads ==
Tongyeong–Daejeon Expressway
toward Tongyeong	←	1 Tongyeong Interchange	→	toward Hanam
Beginning Point	←	1 Tongyeong Interchange	→	1 N. Tongyeong IC; 4.39 km

== History ==
- 12 December 2005: It opened with Tongyeong ~ Jinju segment of Tongyeong–Daejeon Expressway and It was named East Tongyeong Interchange.
- 1 January 2007: The name was changed to Tongyeong Interchange.

== Location ==
- Gyeongsangnam-do
  - Tongyeong-si
    - Yongnam-myeon
      - Dongdal-ri

== Tongyeong Tollgate ==
34°59′27.96″N 127°32′20.01″E

- 'Tongyeong Tollgate'
- Hangul: 통영요금소
- Hanja: 統營料金所
- Revised Romanization: Tongyeong-yogeumso
- McCune–Reischauer: T'ongyŏng-yogŭmso

Tongyeong Tollgate is a tollgate that marks the start of Tongyeong–Daejeon Expressway in the Republic of Korea. It is located in Dongdal-ri, Yongnam-myeon, Tongyeong City, South Gyeongsang Province.

== In popular culture ==
The tollgate was shown in the episode 1 of the drama Who Are You: School 2015 which was broadcast by KBS in 2015.
