= Suraksan Tunnel =

Suraksan Tunnel 수락산터널
- Interactive map of Suraksan Tunnel 수락산터널

Overview
- Line: Seoul Ring Expressway
- Location: Jangam-dong, Uijeongbu Gyeonggi Province; Sanggye-dong, Nowon-gu, Seoul
- Coordinates: 37°41′4″N 127°4′17″E
- Status: Active
- Start: Jangam-dong, Uijeongbu, Gyeonggi Province
- End: Sanggye-dong, Nowon-gu, Seoul

Operation
- Opened: 30 June 2006
- Operator: Seoul Beltway

Technical
- Length: Ilsan-bound: 2,950 m Toegyewon-bound: 2,950 m
- No. of lanes: 8
- Operating speed: 100km/h
- Tunnel clearance: 9.1 m (30 ft)

Suraksan Tunnel is a tunnel on the Seoul Ring Expressway connecting Sanggye-dong, Nowon-gu, Seoul and Jangam-dong, Uijeongbu, Gyeonggi-do. It is made up of a pair of tunnels with four lanes going each way, and the length is 2,950 m in both directions. The width and height are the same as the other tunnels on the same route. Uijeongbu IC is to the north-west of the tunnel, and Sanggye-dong is to the southeast of the tunnel.
