= National Route 4 (South Korea) =

Road in South Korea

National Route 4
- 국도 제4호선
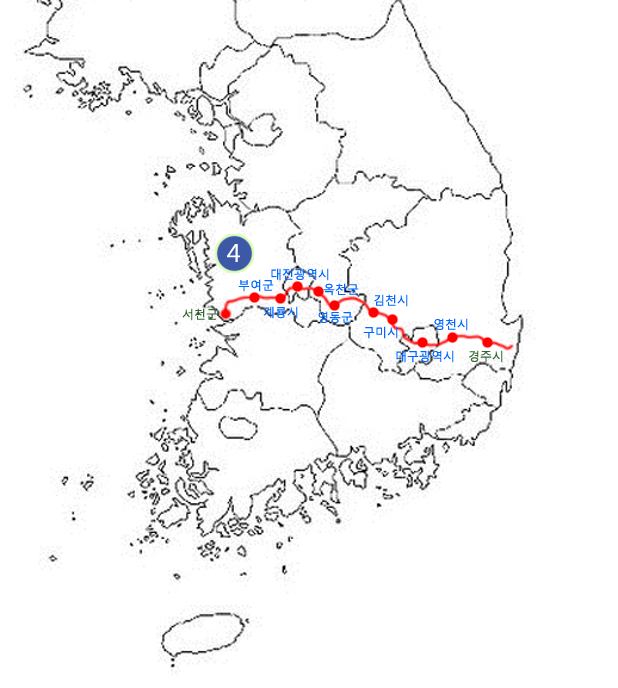

Route information
- Length: 416.9 km (259.0 mi)
- Existed: 31 August 1971–present

Major junctions
- West end: National Route 30 in Haseo-myeon, Buan County
- East end: Gyeonggam-ro in Gyeongju

Location
- Country: South Korea

Highway system
- Highway systems of South Korea; Expressways; National; Local

National Route 4 is a national highway in South Korea that connects the cities of Gunsan and Gyeongju. It opened on 31 August 1971.

== History ==
=== 1970s–2000s ===
- August 31, 1971: The Gunsan-Gyeongju line became National Route No. 4 by the General National Route Designation Ordinance.
- September 8, 1973: Due to alignment improvements, the 1.8 km section from Deukyun-ri, Gwangseok-myeon, Nonsan-gun to Galsan-ri, Seongdong-myeon, the 650m section from Namchon-ri, Hongsan-myeon, Buyeo-gun to Bukchon-ri were changed to 400m, the 4 km section from Gyuam-ri, Gyuam-myeon, Buyeo-gun to Gugyo-ri, Buyeo-eup was changed to 3 km, and the 160m section from Songnae-ri, Maseo-myeon, Seocheon-gun were changed to 140m.
- March 23, 1988: The 1.57 km section from Gyesan-ri, Yeongdong-eup, Yeongdong-gun opened, discontinuing the existing 1.5 km section.
- February 18, 1995: The 5 km section from Buyong-ri to Jugok-ri, Yeongdong-eup, Yeongdong-gun opened, discontinuing the existing 3.8 km section.
- July 1, 1996: The terminus was changed from 'Gampo-eup, Wolseong-gun, Gyeongsangbuk-do' to 'Gampo-eup, Gyeongju-si, Gyeongsangbuk-do'.
- January 12, 1998: A new 2.7 km section opened from Gyuam-ri, Gyuam-myeon, Buyeo-gun to Dongnam-ri, Buyeo-eup, and the existing 1.5 km section was abolished.
- May 8, 1998: The 6 km section from Gwanho-ri, Yakmok-myeon, Chilgok-gun to Samcheong-ri, Waegwan-eup was expanded and opened, and the existing 4.68 km section was abolished.
- April 1, 1999: The 9.72 km section from Godang-ri, Simcheon-myeon, Yeongdong-gun to Buyong-ri, Yeongdong-eup was expanded and opened, and the existing 2.4 km section was abolished.
- July 23, 1999: The 1.32 km section between Jwahong-ri and Namchon-ri, Hongsan-myeon, Buyeo-gun, opened for expansion, and the existing 1.21 km section was abolished.
- June 26, 2000: 2.8 km section of The Guryong Bypass Road (Dongbang-ri, Guryong-myeon, Buyeo-gun - Jujeong-ri) opened, existing 1.75 km section was closed

=== 2000s–present ===
- September 21, 2001: The 8.3 km section from Wonbuk-ri, Seongdong-myeon, Nonsan City to Magupyeong-ri, Bujeok-myeon was expanded and opened. The existing 4.3 km section from Sandong-ri, Gwangjeok-myeon, Nonsan City to Magupyeong-ri, Bujeok-myeon was closed.
- January 30, 2002: Temporary expansion and opening of the Yeongcheon – Bukangan Road of the 7.4 km section of the Bukangan Road (Seokseom-ri, Geumho-eup, Yeongcheon-si ~ Jaksan-dong)
- September 30, 2002: The 18.94 km section of the Waegwan IC - Daegu City Expressway (Samcheong-ri, Waegwan-eup, Chilgok-gun, Gyeongsangbuk-do ~ Taejeon-dong, Buk-gu, Daegu Metropolitan City) opened for expansion.
- October 5, 2002: The 1.21 km section of Masan-ri, Hwanggan-myeon, Yeongdong-gun, Chungcheongbuk-do Opening
- November 1, 2002: The existing 4.55 km section from Wonbuk-ri, Seongdong-myeon, Nonsan City to Sandong-ri, Gwangseok-myeon was closed.
- January 1, 2004: The 3.0 km section of Gwanho Bridge at Gwanho Intersection (Gwanho-ri, Yakmok-myeon, Chilgok-gun, to Murim-ri) opened.
- April 15, 2004: The 11.3 km section of the Yeongcheon-Bukang Road (Seoksim-ri, Geumho-eup, Yeongcheon-si, to Banjeong-ri, Bukang-myeon) was expanded and opened.
- December 28, 2004: The entire 30.5 km section of the Yeongcheon-Bukang Road and the Bukang-Gyeongju Road (Seokseom-ri, Geumho-eup, Yeongcheon-si, to Gwangmyeong-dong, Gyeongju-si) was expanded and opened. The existing 36.3 km section was abolished.
- December 22, 2005: The 6.4 km section from Gwangpyeong-ri, Hwanggan-myeon, Yeongdong-gun, Chungcheongbuk-do to Chupungnyeong-ri, Chupungnyeong-myeon opened, and the existing 5.48 km section was abolished. A 7.32 km section of Chupungnyeong - Gimcheon road (Gwangcheon-ri - Taehwa-ri, Bongsan-myeon, Gimcheon-si) expanded and opened, and the existing 6.5 km section was abolished.
- January 3, 2007: Opening of the 2.2 km section from Yeonhwa Intersection, Geumam-dong, Gyeryong-si, Chungcheongnam-do to Bangdong, Yuseong-gu, Daejeon, expanded and the existing section was abolished.
- November 30, 2007: Partial opening of the 3.5 km section of the Nammyeon ~ Yakmokgan Road (Busangri, Nammyeon, Gimcheon-si - Bosonri, Buksam-eup, Chilgok-gun) to connect with the Nam Gimcheon IC
- January 3, 2008: The starting point was extended from Gunsan-si, Jeollabuk-do to Okdo-myeon, Gunsan-si, Jeollabuk-do.
- December 17, 2008: The entire 19.22 km section of the Gimcheon-Yakmok Road (Deokgok-dong, Gimcheon-si - Bokseong-ri, Yakmok-myeon, Chilgok-gun) was widened and opened.
- December 31, 2008: The 9.49 km section of the Guryong-Buyeo Road (Taeyang-ri, Guryong-myeon, Buyeo-gun, to Dongnam-ri, Buyeo-eup) was expanded and opened. The existing 6.7 km section from Jujeong-ri, Guryong-myeon, Buyeo-gun, to Dongnam-ri, Buyeo-eup, was discontinued.
- January 7, 2009: The Gimcheon-Yakmok Road opened, replacing the existing 14.1 km section from Wolgok-ri, Nongso-myeon, Gimcheon-si, to Seungori, Buk-sam-eup, Chilgok-gun.
- July 17, 2009: The 500m section of the Seocheon-eup Gunsuri ~ Samsanri section in Seocheon-gun was renovated and opened, and the existing 320m section was abolished.
- December 31, 2009: Buyeo ~ Nonsan Road (Buyeo-eup Gunsu-ri, Buyeo-gun ~ Nonsan-si Seongdong-myeon Wonbuk-ri) 13.5 km section expanded and opened, existing 16.2 km section abolished
- December 22, 2011: The 11.88 km section from Bokdae-ri, Pangyo-myeon, Seocheon-gun to Dongbang-ri, Guryong-myeon, Buyeo-gun opened for expansion.
- January 8, 2014: The 1.34 km section of the Ibaek District Hazardous Road (Ibaek-ri, Gunbuk-myeon, Okcheon-gun) was improved and opened, and the former 800m section was discontinued.
- July 31, 2014: The 1.2 km section of Madae-ri ~ Bokdae-ri, Pangyo-myeon, Seocheon-gun, opened for expansion, up from the existing 1.1 km section.
- December 30, 2014: Opening of the 24.9 km section of the Gyeongju-Gampo road (Bodeok-dong, Gyeongju-si - Jeonchon-ri, Gampo-eup), the existing 22.33 km section abolished.
- December 31, 2014: The 8.18 km section of the Seocheon Interchange ~ Pangyo Road (Oseok-ri, Seocheon-eup, Seocheon-gun, Chungcheongnam-do ~ Madae-ri, Pangyo-myeon) was expanded and opened, and the existing 7.75 km section was abolished.
- July 5, 2016: New construction of 4.39 km section of Gogunsan Islands connecting road sections 1 and 2 (Sinsi-do-ri ~ Munyeodo-ri, Okdo-myeon, Gunsan-si) including Gogunsan Bridge opened
- October 21, 2016: Yeongdong ~ Chupungnyeong Road Section 2 (Yeongdong-eup, Gari, Yeongdong-gun ~ Hwanggan-myeon, Gwangpyeong-ri) 9.54 km section opened
- March 15, 2017: Yeongdong ~ Chupungnyeong Road Section 1 (Yeongdong-eup, Yeongdong-gun) opened Buyong-ri ~ Gari) 8.9 km section expanded and opened, existing 9.0 km section abolished
- December 28, 2017: Newly opened 4.38 km section of the 3rd section of the Gogunsan Islands connecting road (Muneodo-ri ~ Jangjado-ri, Okdo-myeon, Gunsan-si)
- October 7, 2018: Due to the collapse of a 150m section of slope near the Janghang intersection on Tohamsan-ro in Yangbuk-myeon, Gyeongju-si, the 2.4 km section from Janghang intersection to Andong intersection was completely closed, Detour traffic using the existing 2.9 km section of the national road.
- December 27, 2018: Dongbaek Bridge (Haemang-dong, Gunsan-si, Jeollabuk-do - Seongju-ri, Janghang-eup, Seocheon-gun, Chungcheongnam-do) 3.185 km section opened
- June 22, 2021: Starting point changed to Okdo-myeon, Gunsan-si, Jeollabuk-do Changed from Gwanri-ri to Baekryeon-ri, Haseo-myeon, Buan-gun, Jeollabuk-do. Accordingly, 'Gunsan - Gyeongju Line' was changed to 'Buan - Gyeongju Line'.
- December 29, 2022: Opening of the 12.7 km section of the first phase of the Saemangeum North-South Road.
- July 23, 2023: New 14.4 km section of the second phase of the Saemangeum North-South Road opens.
- December 19, 2023: New 6.95 km section of the Gimcheon National Road Bypass (Okryul-Daeryong) opened,

== Main stopovers ==
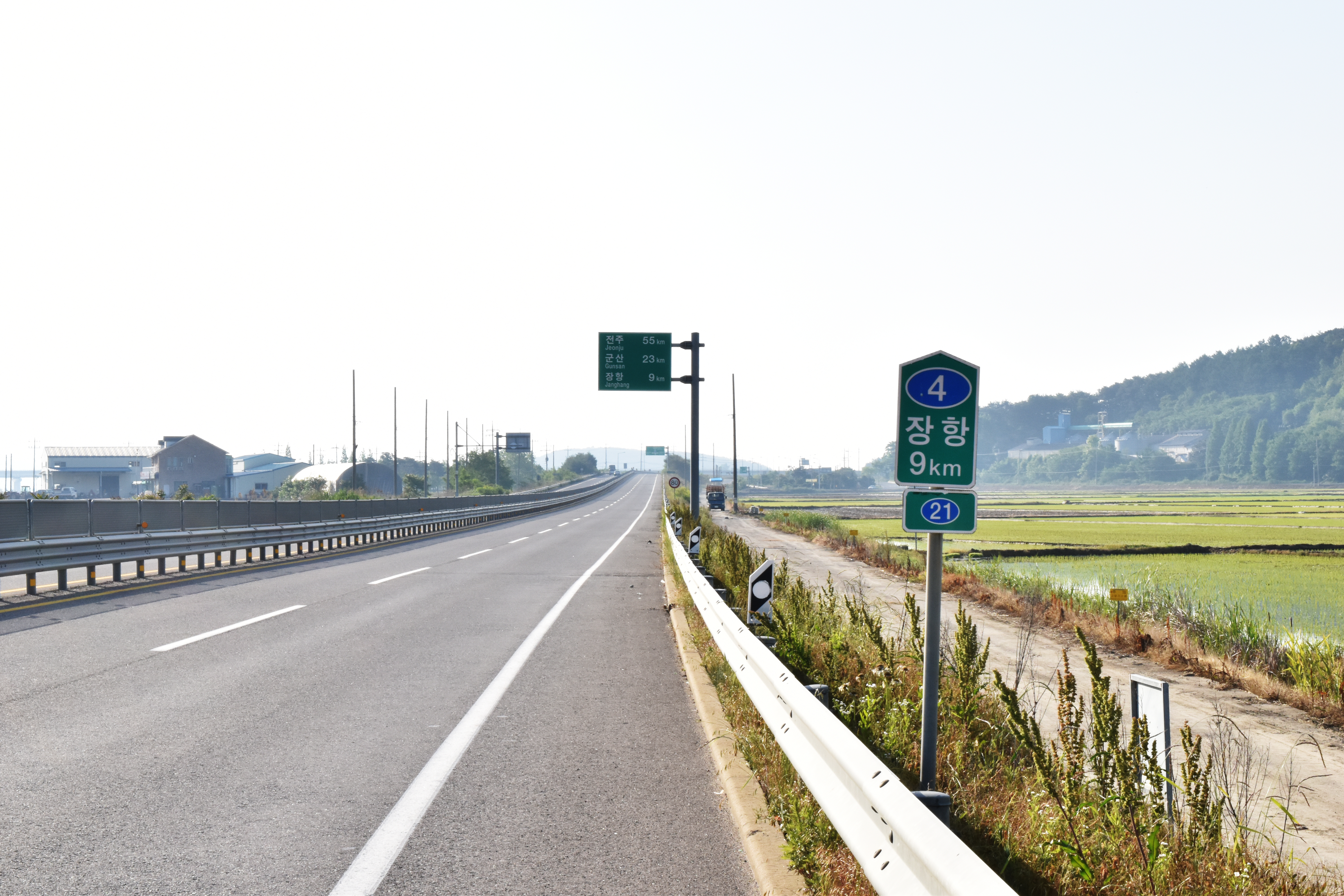
Korean National Route 4 nearby Janghang

North Jeolla Province

- Gunsan

South Chungcheong Province

- Seocheon County - Buyeo County - Nonsan - Gyeryong

Daejeon

- Yuseong District - Seo District - Jung District - Dong District

North Chungcheong Province

- Okcheon County - Yeongdong County

North Gyeongsang Province

- Gimcheon - Chilgok County

Daegu

- Buk District - Seo District - Buk District - Dong District - Suseong District - Dong District

North Gyeongsang Province

- Gyeongsan - Yeongcheon - Gyeongju

== Major intersections ==
- (■): Motorway

IS: Intersection, IC: Interchange

=== North Jeolla Province ===
| Name | Hangul name | Connection | Location | | Note |
|---|---|---|---|---|---|
| Gwanri-do Port | 관리도항 | | Gunsan City | Okdo-myeon | Terminus |
| (Unnamed bridge) | (교량 이름 미상) | | Gunsan City | Okdo-myeon | Under construction Connecting Gwanri-do - Jangja-do |
| Jangja IS (Jangja-do) | 장자 교차로 (장자도) | Jangjado 1-gil | Gunsan City | Okdo-myeon | |
| Jangja Bridge | 장자교 | | Gunsan City | Okdo-myeon | |
| Seonyu Tunnel | 선유터널 | | Gunsan City | Okdo-myeon | Approximately 90m |
| Seonyu 2 IS | 선유2 교차로 | Seonyubuk-gil | Gunsan City | Okdo-myeon | |
| Seonyu 1 IS | 선유1 교차로 | Seonyunam-gil | Gunsan City | Okdo-myeon | |
| Seonyu Bridge | 선유대교 | | Gunsan City | Okdo-myeon | |
| Munyeo 2 IS | 무녀2 교차로 | Munyeodo 4-gil | Gunsan City | Okdo-myeon | |
| Munyeo 2 IS | 무녀2 교차로 | Munyeododong-gil | Gunsan City | Okdo-myeon | |
| Munyeo Bridge Gogunsan Bridge Sinsi Bridge | 무녀교 고군산대교 신시교 | | Gunsan City | Okdo-myeon | |
| Sinsi Elementary School IS | 신시초교삼거리 | Sinsido-gil | Gunsan City | Okdo-myeon | |
| Sinsi 3 IS | 신시3삼거리 | Sinsido-gil | Gunsan City | Okdo-myeon | |
| Sinsi 2 IS | 신시2사거리 | | Gunsan City | Okdo-myeon | |
| Sinsihaean Bridge | 신시해안교 | | Gunsan City | Okdo-myeon | |
| Sinsi-do Port | 신시도항 | | Gunsan City | Okdo-myeon | |
| Sinsi 1 IS | 신시1교차로 | National Route 77 (Saemangeum-ro) | Gunsan City | Okdo-myeon | National Route 77 overlap |
| Saemangeum Seawall (No.3) | 새만금 방조제 (3호) | | Gunsan City | Okdo-myeon | National Route 77 overlap |
| Yami-do | 야미도 | | Gunsan City | Okdo-myeon | National Route 77 overlap |
| Saemangeum Seawall (No.4) | 새만금 방조제 (4호) | | Gunsan City | Okdo-myeon | National Route 77 overlap |
| Saemangeum Seawall (No.4) | | | Gunsan City | Soryong-dong | National Route 77 overlap |
| Sinsi-do Entrance IS | 신시도입구삼거리 | Bieung-ro | Gunsan City | Soryong-dong | National Route 77 overlap |
| Expo IS | 엑스포사거리 | National Route 21 (Saemangeumbuk-ro) | Gunsan City | Soryong-dong | National Route 21, National Route 77 overlap |
| Electrical Substation IS | 변전소사거리 | Dongjangsan-ro; Oehang-ro | Gunsan City | Soryong-dong | National Route 21, National Route 77 overlap |
| Daeu IS | 대우삼거리 | Jangsan-ro | Gunsan City | Soryong-dong | National Route 21, National Route 77 overlap |
| Passenger Terminal IS | 여객터미널삼거리 | Imhae-ro | Gunsan City | Soryong-dong | National Route 21, National Route 77 overlap |
| Gongdan IS | 공단삼거리 | Gongdan-daero | Gunsan City | Soryong-dong | National Route 21, National Route 77 overlap |
| Oego IS | 외고삼거리 | National Route 26 (Gonghang-ro) | Gunsan City | Soryong-dong | National Route 21, National Route 77 overlap |
| Dongbaek Bridge | 동백대교 | | Gunsan City | Haesin-dong | National Route 77 overlap Continuation into South Chungcheong Province |

=== South Chungcheong Province ===
| Name | Hangul name | Connection | Location | | Note |
|---|---|---|---|---|---|
| Dongbaek Bridge | 동백대교 | | Seocheon County | Janghang-eup | National Route 77 overlap North Jeolla Province - South Chungcheong Province border line |
| Wonsu IS | 원수 교차로 | Prefectural Route 68 (Jangsan-ro) | Seocheon County | Janghang-eup | National Route 77 overlap North Jeolla Province - South Chungcheong Province border line |
| Songnae IS | 송내 교차로 | National Route 21 (Geumgang-ro) | Seocheon County | Maseo-myeon | National Route 21, National Route 77 overlap |
| Janghang Station IS | 장항역사거리 | Janghangyeok-gil; Janghangsandan-ro | Seocheon County | Maseo-myeon | National Route 21, National Route 77 overlap |
| Deokam IS | 덕암 교차로 | Okdo-ro | Seocheon County | Maseo-myeon | National Route 21, National Route 77 overlap |
| Samsan IS | 삼산 교차로 | Samsan-gil | Seocheon County | Seocheon-eup | National Route 21, National Route 77 overlap |
| Gunsa 2 IS | 군사2 교차로 | Jangseo-ro | Seocheon County | Seocheon-eup | National Route 21, National Route 77 overlap |
| Gunsa IS | 군사 교차로 | Chungjeol-ro | Seocheon County | Seocheon-eup | National Route 21, National Route 77 overlap |
| No name | (이름 없음) | Sagok-ro | Seocheon County | Seocheon-eup | National Route 21, National Route 77 overlap |
| Oseok IS | 오석사거리 | National Route 21; National Route 77 (Chungseo-ro); Seocheon-ro | Seocheon County | Seocheon-eup | National Route 21, National Route 77 overlap |
| Seocheon IC (Seocheon IC IS) | 서천 나들목 (서천IC삼거리) | Seohaean Expressway | Seocheon County | Seocheon-eup | |
| Hwaseong IS (Hwaseong 1 Bridge) | 화성 교차로 (화성1교) | Daebaekje-ro | Seocheon County | Seocheon-eup | |
| Hwaseong 2 Bridge | 화성2교 | | Seocheon County | Seocheon-eup | |
| Hwaseong 3 Bridge | 화성3교 | | Seocheon County | Seocheon-eup | |
| Hwaseong 3 Bridge | | | Seocheon County | Jongcheon-myeon | |
| Jiseok IS | 지석 교차로 | Jiseok-gil | Seocheon County | Jongcheon-myeon | |
| Heungrim Bridge | 흥림교 | | Seocheon County | Pangyo-myeon | |
| Mungok IS | 문곡 교차로 | Hudong-gil | Seocheon County | Pangyo-myeon | |
| Hyeonam Bridge | 현암교 | | Seocheon County | Pangyo-myeon | |
| Suseong IS | 수성 교차로 | Prefectural Route 617 (Jongpan-ro) | Seocheon County | Pangyo-myeon | Prefectural Route 617 overlap |
| Suseong Bridge Jisangwaseon Bridge | 수성교 지산과선교 | | Seocheon County | Pangyo-myeon | Prefectural Route 617 overlap |
| Pangyo IS | 판교 교차로 | Prefectural Route 617 (Panmi-ro) | Seocheon County | Pangyo-myeon | Prefectural Route 617 overlap |
| Bokdae 1 IS | 복대1 교차로 | Daebaekje-ro; Daebaekje-ro 2171beon-gil | Seocheon County | Pangyo-myeon | |
| Daedeok IS | 대덕 교차로 | Daedeok-ro | Buyeo County | Oksan-myeon | |
| Oksan 1 IS | 옥산1 교차로 | Sinan-ro | Buyeo County | Oksan-myeon | |
| Oksan 2 IS | 옥산2 교차로 | Oksandong-ro; Oksanbuk-ro | Buyeo County | Oksan-myeon | |
| Suam 1 IS | 수암1 교차로 | Annam-ro | Buyeo County | Oksan-myeon | |
| Suam 2 IS | 수암2 교차로 | Annam-ro | Buyeo County | Oksan-myeon | |
| Hongsan 1 IS | 홍산1 교차로 | Biheung-ro; Daebaekje-ro 576beon-gil | Buyeo County | Hongsan-myeon | |
| Hongsan 2 IS | 홍산2 교차로 | Hanhuidong-ro | Buyeo County | Hongsan-myeon | |
| Namchon IS | 남촌사거리 | Prefectural Route 611; Prefectural Route 613 (Palchung-ro); Hongsansijang-ro | Buyeo County | Hongsan-myeon | Prefectural Route 611, 613 overlap |
| Hongsan IS | 홍산 교차로 | Prefectural Route 611 (Namseong-ro); Bukto-ro | Buyeo County | Hongsan-myeon | Prefectural Route 611, 613 overlap |
| Jwahong IS | 좌홍 교차로 | Prefectural Route 613 (Hongsan-ro) | Buyeo County | Hongsan-myeon | Prefectural Route 613 overlap |
| Gyowon IS | 교원 교차로 | Daebaekje-ro 817beon-gil Daebaekje-ro 848beon-gil | Buyeo County | Hongsan-myeon | |
| Jeomdong IS | 점동 교차로 | Samyong-ro; Hongsanjeomdong-ro | Buyeo County | Nam-myeon | |
| Songjeong IS | 송정 교차로 | Songsu-ro; Jomu-ro | Buyeo County | Nam-myeon | |
| West Buyeo IC (West Buyeo IC IS) | 서부여 나들목 (서부여IC 교차로) | Seocheon-Gongju Expressway | Buyeo County | Hongsan-myeon | |
| Dongbang IS | 동방 교차로 | Banggye-ro; Heungsu-ro | Buyeo County | Guryong-myeon | |
| No name | (이름 없음) | Prefectural Route 723 (Guryong-ro) | Buyeo County | Guryong-myeon | Prefectural Route 723 overlap |
| Guryong IS | 구룡 교차로 | National Route 40; Prefectural Route 723 (Heungsu-ro) | Buyeo County | Guryong-myeon | Prefectural Route 723 overlap Connected with Jujeong IS |
| Gubong IS | 구봉 교차로 | National Route 40 (Heungsu-ro) | Buyeo County | Guryong-myeon | National Route 40 overlap |
| Hapsong IS | 합송 교차로 | Hapsongseo-ro | Buyeo County | Gyuam-myeon | National Route 40 overlap |
| Naeri IS | 내리 교차로 | National Route 29; National Route 39 (Gyuam Bypass Road) | Buyeo County | Gyuam-myeon | National Route 39, National Route 40 overlap |
| Gyuam IS | 규암 교차로 | Prefectural Route 625 (Chungjeol-ro) | Buyeo County | Gyuam-myeon | National Route 39, National Route 40 overlap |
| Buyeo Bridge | 부여대교 | | Buyeo County | Gyuam-myeon | National Route 39, National Route 40 overlap |
| Buyeo Bridge | | | Buyeo County | Buyeo-eup | National Route 39, National Route 40 overlap |
| Buyeo IS | 부여 교차로 | Seongwang-ro | Buyeo County | Buyeo-eup | National Route 39, National Route 40 overlap |
| Daewang IS | 대왕 교차로 | Geumseong-ro | Buyeo County | Buyeo-eup | National Route 39, National Route 40 overlap |
| Gatap IS | 가탑 교차로 | National Route 40 (Seongwang-ro) | Buyeo County | Buyeo-eup | National Route 39, National Route 40 overlap |
| Wangneung IS | 왕릉 교차로 | Dongmun-ro | Buyeo County | Buyeo-eup | |
| Neungsan IS | 능산 교차로 | Wangneung-ro | Buyeo County | Buyeo-eup | |
| Yeomchang IS | 염창 교차로 | Wangneung-ro | Buyeo County | Buyeo-eup | |
| Sabi Tunnel | 사비터널 | | Buyeo County | Buyeo-eup | Right tunnel: Approximately 860m Left tunnel: Approximately 820m |
| Sabi Tunnel | | | Buyeo County | Seokseong-myeon | Right tunnel: Approximately 860m Left tunnel: Approximately 820m |
| Seokseong IS | 석성 교차로 | Prefectural Route 799 (Geumbaek-ro) | Buyeo County | Seokseong-myeon | |
| Jeungsan IS | 증산 교차로 | Wangneung-ro | Buyeo County | Seokseong-myeon | |
| Yeonhwa IS | 연화 교차로 | Yeonhwa-ro | Buyeo County | Seokseong-myeon | |
| Gungye Bridge | 군계교 | | Buyeo County | Seokseong-myeon | |
| Gungye Bridge | | | Nonsan City | Gwangseok-myeon | |
| Wonbuk IS | 원북 교차로 | Nonsanpyeongya-ro | Nonsan City | Gwangseok-myeon | |
| No name | (이름 없음) | Nonsanpyeongya-ro | Nonsan City | Gwangseok-myeon | |
| West Nonsan IC | 서논산 나들목 | Nonsan-Cheonan Expressway | Nonsan City | Gwangseok-myeon | |
| Nonsan IS | 논산 교차로 | National Route 23 (Deugan-daero); Daebaekje-ro | Nonsan City | Gwangseok-myeon | National Route 23 overlap |
| Gwangseok IS | 광석 교차로 | National Route 23 (Deugan-daero); Prefectural Route 643 (Jangmaru-ro) | Nonsan City | Gwangseok-myeon | National Route 23 overlap |
| Noseong Bridge | 노성대교 | | Nonsan City | Gwangseok-myeon | |
| Noseong Bridge | | | Nonsan City | Bujeok-myeon | |
| Yulrim Overpass | 율림과선교 | | Nonsan City | Bujeok-myeon | |
| Bujeok IS | 부적 교차로 | National Route 1 (Gyebaek-ro) | Nonsan City | Bujeok-myeon | National Route 1 overlap |
| Magupyeong IS | 마구평삼거리 | Prefectural Route 691 (Baekilhyeon-ro) | Nonsan City | Bujeok-myeon | National Route 1 overlap |
| Oeseong IS | 외성삼거리 | Chunggok-ro; Buhwang-gil | Nonsan City | Bujeok-myeon | National Route 1 overlap |
| Imri IS | 임리삼거리 | Gwanchang-ro | Nonsan City | Bujeok-myeon | National Route 1 overlap |
| Yeonsan IS | 연산사거리 | Prefectural Route 697 (Hwangsanbeol-ro) | Nonsan City | Yeonsan-myeon | National Route 1 overlap |
| Gaetaesa Station | 개태사역 | | Nonsan City | Yeonsan-myeon | National Route 1 overlap |
| Gyeryong Culture & Arts Center | 계룡문화예술의전당 | | Gyeryong City | Eomsa-myeon | National Route 1 overlap |
| Yudong IS | 유동삼거리 | Prefectural Route 645 (Munhwa-ro) | Gyeryong City | Eomsa-myeon | National Route 1 overlap |
| Samjin IS | 삼진삼거리 | Eomsajungang-ro | Gyeryong City | Eomsa-myeon | National Route 1 overlap |
| Yangjeong Intercity Bus Stop | 양정시외버스정류소 | | Gyeryong City | Eomsa-myeon | National Route 1 overlap |
| Yangjeong IS | 양정삼거리 | Geumam-ro | Gyeryong City | Eomsa-myeon | National Route 1 overlap |
| Yeonhwa IS | 연화 교차로 | Gyeryong-daero | Gyeryong City | Eomsa-myeon | National Route 1 overlap Gyeryong IC indirect connected with (Honam Expressway Branch) |
| Gyeryong Bridge | 계룡대교 | | Gyeryong City | Eomsa-myeon | National Route 1 overlap Continuation into Daejeon |

=== Daejeon ===
| Name | Hangul name | Connection | Location | | Note |
|---|---|---|---|---|---|
| Gyeryong Bridge | 계룡대교 | | Daejeon | Yuseong District | National Route 1 overlap South Chungcheong Province - Daejeon border line |
| Duma IS | 두마 교차로 | National Route 1 (Baegun-ro) | Daejeon | Yuseong District | National Route 1 overlap South Chungcheong Province - Daejeon border line |
| North of Gyeryong Overpass | 계룡과선교 북단 | Wangdae-ro | Daejeon | Yuseong District | |
| Eonggogae | 엉고개 | | Daejeon | Yuseong District | |
| Bangdong Bridge | 방동대교 | | Daejeon | Yuseong District | |
| West Daejeon IC | 서대전 나들목 | Daejeon Southern Ring Expressway | Daejeon | North: Yuseong District; South: Seo District | |
| West Daejeon IC IS | 서대전 나들목삼거리 | Jinjam-ro; Gyebaek-ro 828beon-gil | Daejeon | North: Yuseong District; South: Seo District | |
| Jinjam Town Apartment | 진잠타운아파트 | Gubongsanbuk-ro | Daejeon | North: Yuseong District; South: Seo District | |
| Jinjam IS | 진잠네거리 | Prefectural Route 32 (Yuseong-daero); Gubong-ro | Daejeon | North: Yuseong District; South: Seo District | |
| Gubong Middle IS | 구봉중삼거리 | Gwanjeoseo-ro | Daejeon | North: Yuseong District; South: Seo District | |
| Gwanjeo IS (Gwanjeo Underpass) | 관저네거리 (관저지하차도) | Doan-daero; Gwanjeojung-ro | Daejeon | Seo District | |
| Gwanjeo·Konyang University Hospital Intercity Bus Terminal | 관저·건양대병원시외버스정류소 | | Daejeon | Seo District | |
| Konyang Hospital IS | 건양병원네거리 | Gưanjeodong-ro | Daejeon | Seo District | |
| Gasuwon IS | 가수원네거리 | Doan-daero; Beolgok-ro | Daejeon | Seo District | |
| Gasuwon Bridge | 가수원교 | | Daejeon | Seo District | |
| Jeongnim IS | 정림삼거리 | Jeongnim-ro | Daejeon | Seo District | |
| Bultigureum Bridge | 불티구름다리 | Baejae-ro; Hyecheon-ro | Daejeon | Seo District | |
| Daejeon Nambu Fire Station | 대전남부소방서 | Boksuseo-ro | Daejeon | Seo District | |
| Doma IS | 도마삼거리 | Dosol-ro | Daejeon | Seo District | |
| Doma-dong Intercity Bus Stop Daejeon Seobu Office of Education | 도마동시외버스정류장 대전서부교육지원청 | | Daejeon | Seo District | |
| Doma IS | 도마네거리 | Dosan-ro | Daejeon | Seo District | |
| Doma Underpass | 도마지하차도 | Yudeung-ro | Daejeon | Seo District | |
| Yudeung Bridge | 유등교 | | Daejeon | Seo District | |
| Yudeung Bridge | | | Daejeon | Jung District | |
| Beodeunae IS | 버드내네거리 | Daedunsan-ro; Taepyeong-ro | Daejeon | Jung District | |
| Yucheon IS | 유천네거리 | Yucheon-ro | Daejeon | Jung District | |
| Seodaejeon Overpass | 서대전육교 | | Daejeon | Jung District | |
| Seodaejeon station IS | 서대전역네거리 | Oryu-ro | Daejeon | Jung District | |
| Seodaejeon Negeori station (Seodaejeon IS) | 서대전네거리역 (서대전네거리) | National Route 32 (Gyeryong-ro); Jungang-ro | Daejeon | Jung District | |
| Chungnam National University Hospital IS | 충대병원네거리 | Muhwa-ro; Bomunsan-ro | Daejeon | Jung District | |
| Temi IS | 테미삼거리 | Temi-ro | Daejeon | Jung District | |
| Bomun IS | 보문오거리 | Bomun-ro; Bomunsangongwon-ro | Daejeon | Jung District | |
| Hanbat Sports Complex | 한밭종합운동장 | | Daejeon | Jung District | |
| Chungmu-ro IS | 충무로네거리 | Daejong-ro | Daejeon | Jung District | |
| Bomun Bridge | 보문교 | | Daejeon | Jung District | |
| Bomun Bridge | | | Daejeon | Dong District | |
| Indong IS | 인동네거리 | National Route 17 (Daejeon-ro) | Daejeon | Dong District | |
| 1st Chisu Bridge | 제1치수교앞 | Chungmu-ro; Daedongcheonuan 3-gil | Daejeon | Dong District | |
| 2nd Chisu Bridge IS | 제2치수교앞네거리 | Gyejok-ro | Daejeon | Dong District | |
| Sinheung Station | 신흥역 | | Daejeon | Dong District | |
| Panam Station | 판암역 | Dongbu-ro; Donggucheong-ro | Daejeon | Dong District | |
| Panam IS | 판암네거리 | Saeul-ro | Daejeon | Dong District | |
| Panam IC (Panam Underpass) | 판암 나들목 (판암 지하차도) | Tongyeong-Daejeon Expressway | Daejeon | Dong District | |
| Daejeon Dongsin Science High School | 동신과학고등학교 | | Daejeon | Dong District | |
| Biryong IS | 비룡삼거리 | Daecheonghosu-ro | Daejeon | Dong District | |
| Sikjangsan IS | 식장산삼거리 | Secheongongwon-ro | Daejeon | Dong District | |
| Secheon Elementary School Daecheong-dong Community Center | 세천초등학교 대청동주민센터 | | Daejeon | Dong District | |
| Secheon IS | 세천삼거리 | Hoenam-ro | Daejeon | Dong District | |
| Madalryeong | 마달령 | | Daejeon | Dong District | Continuation into North Chungcheong Province |

=== North Chungcheong Province ===
| Name | Hangul name | Connection | Location | | Note |
|---|---|---|---|---|---|
| Madalryeong | 마달령 | | Okcheon County | Gunbuk-myeon | Daejeon - North Chungcheong Province border line |
| Jeungyak Elementary School | 증약초등학교 | | Okcheon County | Gunbuk-myeon | |
| Ibaek IS | 이백삼거리 | Hwansan-ro | Okcheon County | Gunbuk-myeon | |
| Gunbuk-myeon Office | 군북면사무소 | | Okcheon County | Gunbuk-myeon | |
| Seojeong 2 IS | 서정2 교차로 | National Route 37 (Daecheong-ro) | Okcheon County | Okcheon-eup | Connected with Seojeong 1 IS |
| Samyang IS | 삼양사거리 | Seongwang-ro | Okcheon County | Okcheon-eup | |
| Samyang IS | 삼양삼거리 | Samyang-ro | Okcheon County | Okcheon-eup | |
| Okcheon Intericty Bus Terminal Okcheon Bridge | 옥천시외버스공용정류장 옥천대교 | | Okcheon County | Okcheon-eup | |
| Gahwa Underpass | 가화지하차도 | Prefectural Route 501 (Geumjang-ro) | Okcheon County | Okcheon-eup | |
| Okcheon station (Okcheon IS) | 옥천역 (역전삼거리) | | Okcheon County | Okcheon-eup | |
| Maam IS | 마암삼거리 | Jungang-ro 1-gil | Okcheon County | Okcheon-eup | |
| Overpass IS | 과선교사거리 | Maam-ro | Okcheon County | Okcheon-eup | |
| Wongak IS | 원각사거리 | Cheongpung-ro | Okcheon County | Okcheon-eup | |
| Jeokha IS | 적하삼거리 | Prefectural Route 501 (Donginonggong-gil) | Okcheon County | Dongi-myeon | Prefectural Route 501 overlap |
| Gujimti IS | 구짐티삼거리 | Myomok-ro | Okcheon County | Iwon-myeon | Prefectural Route 501 overlap |
| Geomjin Bridge | 검진교 | | Okcheon County | Iwon-myeon | Prefectural Route 501 overlap |
| Iwon IS | 이원삼거리 | Prefectural Route 501 (Myomok-ro) | Okcheon County | Iwon-myeon | Prefectural Route 501 overlap |
| Wondong IS | 원동삼거리 | Prefectural Route 514 (Iwonsimcheon-ro) | Okcheon County | Iwon-myeon | |
| Godang Bridge | 고당교 | | Yeongdong County | Simcheon-myeon | |
| Yakmok IS | 약목사거리 | Prefectural Route 505 (Iwonsimcheon-ro) | Yeongdong County | Simcheon-myeon | |
| Gakgye Bridge | 각계교 | | Yeongdong County | Simcheon-myeon | |
| Gakgye Bridge | | | Yeongdong County | Yeongdong-eup | |
| Sanri Bridge | 산리교 | | Yeongdong County | Yeongdong-eup | |
| Ojeong IS | 오정삼거리 | Ojeong-gil | Yeongdong County | Yeongdong-eup | |
| Buyong IS | 부용 교차로 | National Route 19 (Nambu-ro) | Yeongdong County | Yeongdong-eup | National Route 19 overlap |
| Buyong IS | 부용사거리 | Jungang-ro; Haksanyeongdong-ro | Yeongdong County | Yeongdong-eup | National Route 19 overlap |
| Maecheon IS | 매천 교차로 | Prefectural Route 68 (Yeongdonghwanggan-ro); Buyongdong 1-ro | Yeongdong County | Yeongdong-eup | National Route 19 overlap Prefectural Route 68 overlap |
| Yeongdong IS | 영동 교차로 | National Route 19; Prefectural Route 68 (Yeongdong-ro) | Yeongdong County | Yeongdong-eup | National Route 19 overlap Prefectural Route 68 overlap |
| Neulmeoni IS | 늘머니 교차로 | Yeongdonghwanggan-ro; Yongdugongwon-ro | Yeongdong County | Yeongdong-eup | |
| Maecheon Bridge Sambongcheon Bridge | 매천교 삼봉천교 | | Yeongdong County | Yeongdong-eup | |
| Jugok IS | 주곡 교차로 | Sanmakgol-gil | Yeongdong County | Yeongdong-eup | |
| Imgye Bridge | 임계교 | | Yeongdong County | Yeongdong-eup | |
| Imgye Tunnel | 임계터널 | | Yeongdong County | Yeongdong-eup | Right tunnel: Approximately 246m Left tunnel: Approximately 311m |
| Gari Tunnel | 가리터널 | | Yeongdong County | Yeongdong-eup | Right tunnel: Approximately 252m Left tunnel: Approximately 128m |
| Hagari Bridge Junggari Bridge Samgari Bridge | 하가리교 중가리교 상가리교 | | Yeongdong County | Yeongdong-eup | |
| Gari IS | 가리 교차로 | Yeongdonghwanggan-ro; Sangga-gil | Yeongdong County | Yeongdong-eup | |
| Seosongwon 1 Bridge | 서송원1교 | | Yeongdong County | Hwanggan-myeon | |
| Seosongwon IS | 서송원 교차로 | Sintan-ro; Seosongwon-gil | Yeongdong County | Hwanggan-myeon | |
| Seosongwon 2 Bridge Anhwa 1 Bridge Anhwa 2 Bridge | 서송원2교 안화1교 안화2교 | | Yeongdong County | Hwanggan-myeon | |
| Masan IS | 마산 교차로 | Yeongdonghwanggan-ro | Yeongdong County | Hwanggan-myeon | |
| Masan Tunnel | 마산터널 | | Yeongdong County | Hwanggan-myeon | Right tunnel: Approximately 335m Left tunnel: Approximately 310m |
| Ansin 1 Bridge | 안신1교 | | Yeongdong County | Hwanggan-myeon | |
| Sogye IS | 소계 교차로 | Prefectural Route 49; Prefectural Route 901 (Minjujisan-ro) | Yeongdong County | Hwanggan-myeon | |
| Marae 1 Bridge Marae 2 Bridge | 마래1교 마래2교 | | Yeongdong County | Hwanggan-myeon | |
| Saedongne IS | 새동네 교차로 | Yeongdonghwanggan-ro | Yeongdong County | Hwanggan-myeon | |
| Gwangpyeong IS | 광평 교차로 | Gwangpyeong-gil | Yeongdong County | Hwanggan-myeon | |
| Gyeryong IS | 계룡 교차로 | Chupungnyeong-ro; Gyeryong 1-gil | Yeongdong County | Chupungnyeong-myeon | |
| Chupungnyeong 1 Bridge Chupungnyeong 2 Bridge Chupungnyeong 3 Bridge Chupungnyeong 4 Bridge | 추풍령1교 추풍령2교 추풍령3교 추풍령4교 | | Yeongdong County | Chupungnyeong-myeon | |
| Saburi IS | 사부리 교차로 | Chupungnyeong-ro | Yeongdong County | Chupungnyeong-myeon | |
| Wongwan Overpass Chupungnyeong 5 Bridge | 원관과선교 추풍령5교 | | Yeongdong County | Chupungnyeong-myeon | |
| Eunpyeon IS | 은편 교차로 | Eunpyeon-gil | Yeongdong County | Chupungnyeong-myeon | |
| Chupungnyeong Overpass | 추풍령과선교 | | Yeongdong County | Chupungnyeong-myeon | |
| Chupungnyeong IS | 추풍령 교차로 | Bongsan-ro; Sinan-ro | Yeongdong County | Chupungnyeong-myeon | |
| Chupungnyeong | 추풍령 | | Yeongdong County | Chupungnyeong-myeon | Continuation into North Gyeongsang Province |

=== North Gyeongsang Province (West Daegu) ===
| Name | Hangul name | Connection | Location | | Note |
|---|---|---|---|---|---|
| Chupungnyeong | 추풍령 | | Gimcheon City | Bongsan-myeon | North Chungcheong Province - North Gyeongsang Province border line |
| Gwangcheon IS | 광천네거리 | Bongsan-ro; Gwangcheon 2-gil | Gimcheon City | Bongsan-myeon | |
| Taehwa Overpass | 태화고가교 | | Gimcheon City | Bongsan-myeon | |
| Deokcheon IS | 덕천네거리 | Prefectural Route 903 (Hwangang-ro) | Gimcheon City | Bongsan-myeon | |
| Yongbok Bridge | 용복교 | | Gimcheon City | Bongsan-myeon | |
| Yongbok Bridge | | | Gimcheon City | Daehang-myeon | |
| KT&G | KT&G | | Gimcheon City | Daehang-myeon | |
| Gimcheon Dasu Elementary School | 김천다수초등학교 | | Gimcheon City | Daegok-dong | |
| Daegok IS | 대곡삼거리 | Prefectural Route 514 (Yeongnam-daero) | Gimcheon City | Daegok-dong | |
| Daegok-dong Community Center Gimcheon Middle School Gimcheon High School | 대곡동주민센터 김천중학교 김천고등학교 | | Gimcheon City | Daegok-dong | |
| Simintap IS | 시민탑삼거리 | Simin-ro | Gimcheon City | Daegok-dong | |
| Gimcheon Station | 김천역 | | Gimcheon City | Pyeonghwanamsan-dong | |
| Seongnam Bridge IS | 성남교삼거리 | Chunghyo-gil | Gimcheon City | Pyeonghwanamsan-dong | |
| Gimcheon Jungang Elementary School Gimcheon Police Station | 김천중앙초등학교 김천경찰서 | | Gimcheon City | Pyeonghwanamsan-dong | |
| No name | (이름 없음) | Yanggeum-ro | Gimcheon City | Yanggeum-dong | Used Seongnam Bridge IS |
| No name | (이름 없음) | Jasan-ro | Gimcheon City | Jasan-dong | Used Seongnam Bridge IS |
| Yongam IS | 용암사거리 | National Route 59 (Yongam-ro) | Gimcheon City | Jasan-dong | National Route 59 overlap |
| Gimcheon Bridge IS | 김천교사거리 | Gangbyeon-ro | Gimcheon City | Jasan-dong | National Route 59 overlap |
| Gimcheon Bridge | 김천교 | | Gimcheon City | Jasan-dong | National Route 59 overlap |
| Gimcheon Bridge | | | Gimcheon City | Jijwa-dong | National Route 59 overlap |
| Gimcheon Bridge IS | 김천교 교차로 | Baedari-gil; Hwangsan 3-gil | Gimcheon City | Jijwa-dong | National Route 59 overlap |
| Gamcheon IS | 감천삼거리 | National Route 59 (Geumgang-ro) | Gimcheon City | Jijwa-dong | National Route 59 overlap |
| Gimcheon Fire Station Gimcheon Dongbu Elementary School | 김천소방서 김천동부초등학교 | | Gimcheon City | Jijwa-dong | |
| Jijwa Overpass | 지좌육교 | Prefectural Route 514 (Yeongnam-daero) | Gimcheon City | Jijwa-dong | Prefectural Route 514 overlap |
| Munseong Middle School | 문성중학교 | | Gimcheon City | Jijwa-dong | Prefectural Route 514 overlap |
| Musil IS | 무실삼거리 | Prefectural Route 514 (Apo-daero) | Gimcheon City | Jijwa-dong | Prefectural Route 514 overlap |
| Nongso IS | 농소 교차로 | National Route 3 (Gimcheonsunhwan-ro) | Gimcheon City | Nongso-myeon | |
| Wolgok IS | 월곡 교차로 | Nongnam-ro; Yongsi-gil | Gimcheon City | Nongso-myeon | |
| Ipseok IS | 입석 교차로 | Prefectural Route 913 (Nammyeon-ro) (Byeokso-ro) | Gimcheon City | Nongso-myeon | |
| Ungok IS | 운곡 교차로 | Unyang-gil | Gimcheon City | Nam-myeon | |
| Songgok IS | 송곡 교차로 | Nongnam-ro; Obong-ro | Gimcheon City | Nam-myeon | |
| Magok IS | 마곡 교차로 | Nongnam-ro | Gimcheon City | Nam-myeon | |
| Samosil IS | 사모실 교차로 | Nongnam-ro | Gimcheon City | Nam-myeon | |
| South Gimcheon IC (Busang IS) | 남김천 나들목 (부상 교차로) | Jungbu Naeryuk Expressway; Nongnam-ro | Gimcheon City | Nam-myeon | |
| Nambuk IS | 남북 교차로 | Nongnam-ro | Gimcheon City | Nam-myeon | |
| Jigyeong Bridge | 지경교 | | Gimcheon City | Nam-myeon | |
| Jigyeong Bridge | | | Chilgok County | Buksam-eup | |
| Sungo IS | 숭오 교차로 | Geumodongcheon-ro | Chilgok County | Buksam-eup | |
| Bokseong IS | 복성네거리 | Geumo-daero | Chilgok County | Yakmok-myeon | |
| Yangmok station (Yangmok Station IS) | 약목역 (약목역삼거리) | Yangmok-ro | Chilgok County | Yakmok-myeon | |
| Namgye IS | 남계삼거리 | Yangmok-ro | Chilgok County | Yakmok-myeon | |
| Gwanho IS | 관호 교차로 | National Route 33 (Gangbyeonseo-ro) | Chilgok County | Yakmok-myeon | National Route 33 overlap |
| Chilgok Police Station | 칠곡경찰서 | | Chilgok County | Yakmok-myeon | National Route 33 overlap |
| Gwanho IS | 관호오거리 | Waegwan Bridge; Gwanho 8-gil | Chilgok County | Yakmok-myeon | National Route 33 overlap |
| Chilgok Fire Station | 칠곡소방서 | | Chilgok County | Gisan-myeon | National Route 33 overlap |
| Jukjeon IS | 죽전 교차로 | National Route 33 (Gaya-ro) | Chilgok County | Gisan-myeon | National Route 33 overlap |
| 2nd Waegwan Bridge | 제2왜관교 | | Chilgok County | Gisan-myeon | |
| 2nd Waegwan Bridge | | Prefectural Route 67; Prefectural Route 79 (Gangbyeon-daero) | Chilgok County | Waegwan-eup | Prefectural Route 79 overlap |
| Maewon IS | 매원사거리 | Prefectural Route 79 (Hoguk-ro); Gwanmun-ro | Chilgok County | Waegwan-eup | Prefectural Route 79 overlap |
| Waegwan IC | 왜관 나들목 | Gyeongbu Expressway | Chilgok County | Waegwan-eup | |
| Gongdan IS | 공단삼거리 | Gongdan-ro | Chilgok County | Waegwan-eup | |
| Chilgok-Mulryu IC (Yeonhwa IS) (Yeonhwa station) | 칠곡물류 나들목 (연화 교차로) (연화역) | Gyeongbu Expressway; Geumho-ro | Chilgok County | Jicheon-myeon | |
| No name | (이름 없음) | Sindong-ro | Chilgok County | Jicheon-myeon | |
| Sindong IS | 신동 교차로 | Habin-ro | Chilgok County | Jicheon-myeon | |
| No name | (이름 없음) | Prefectural Route 923 (Jicheon-ro) | Chilgok County | Jicheon-myeon | |
| Yeonho IS | 연호 교차로 | Sasu-ro | Chilgok County | Jicheon-myeon | |
| Naksan IS | 낙산삼거리 | Sindongjae-ro | Chilgok County | Jicheon-myeon | Continuation into Daegu |

=== Daegu ===
| Name | Hangul name | Connection | Location | | Note |
|---|---|---|---|---|---|
| Taecheon Overpass | 태전고가교 | Gwaneum-ro; Naksan-ro | Daegu | Buk District | North Gyeongsang Province - Daegu border line |
| Kangbuk High School Daegu Taehyeon Elementary School Youngsong Girl's High School Daegu Health College | 강북고등학교 대구태현초등학교 영송여자고등학교 대구보건대학교 | | Daegu | Buk District | |
| Taejeon IS | 태전삼거리 | National Route 5 National Route 25 (Chilgokjungang-daero) | Daegu | Buk District | National Route 5, National Route 25 overlap |
| Taejeon Station | 태전역 | | Daegu | Buk District | National Route 5, National Route 25 overlap |
| Paldal-ro IS (Paldal Overpass) (Maecheon Market Station) | 팔달로 교차로 (팔달고가차도) (매천시장역) | Maecheon-ro 18-gil | Daegu | Buk District | National Route 5, National Route 25 overlap |
| North Daegu Freight Terminal | 대구북부화물터미널 | | Daegu | Buk District | National Route 5, National Route 25 overlap |
| Paldal Bridge | 팔달교 | | Daegu | Buk District | National Route 5, National Route 25 overlap |
| Paldal Bridge | | | Daegu | Seo District | National Route 5, National Route 25 overlap |
| Paldal Bridge IS | 팔달교 교차로 | Sincheon-daero | Daegu | Seo District | National Route 5, National Route 25 overlap |
| Gongdan Station | 공단역 | | Daegu | Seo District | National Route 5, National Route 25 overlap |
| Manpyeong IS (Seodaegu Express Bus Terminal) (Manpyeong Station) | 만평네거리 (서대구고속버스터미널) (만평역) | National Route 5 (Seodaegu-ro); Paldal-ro | Daegu | Seo District | National Route 5, National Route 25 overlap |
| Nowon IS | 노원네거리 | Obong-ro | Daegu | Buk District | National Route 25 overlap |
| Baeksabeol IS | 백사벌네거리 | Chimsan-ro | Daegu | Buk District | National Route 25 overlap |
| (Chimsan Bridge Underpass) | (침산교지하차도) | Sincheon-daero | Daegu | Buk District | National Route 25 overlap |
| Chimsan Bridge IS | 침산교 교차로 | Sincheondong-ro | Daegu | Buk District | National Route 25 overlap |
| Yeonam IS | 연암네거리 | Yeonam-ro | Daegu | Buk District | National Route 25 overlap |
| Yutongdanji IS | 유통단지삼거리 | Hoguk-ro | Daegu | Buk District | National Route 25 overlap |
| Sangyeok Middle School IS | 산격중학교 교차로 | Sangyeok-ro | Daegu | Buk District | National Route 25 overlap |
| Bokhyeon IS (Bokhyeon Overpass) | 복현오거리 (복현고가교) | Geomdan-ro; Gonghang-ro; Daehak-ro | Daegu | Buk District | National Route 25 overlap |
| Bokhyeon IS | 복현네거리 | Gyeongdae-ro; Bokhyeon-ro | Daegu | Buk District | National Route 25 overlap |
| Keungogae IS (Hyomok Overpass) | 큰고개오거리 (효목고가차도) | Sinamnam-ro; Ayang-ro | Daegu | Dong District | National Route 25 overlap |
| (Hyomok Underpass) | (효목지하차도) | Dongbu-ro | Daegu | Dong District | National Route 25 overlap |
| Hyomok IS (Hyomok IS Underpass) | 효목네거리 (효목네거리지하차도) | National Route 25 (Muyeol-ro); Hwarang-ro | Daegu | Dong District | National Route 25 overlap |
| Mangudang IS (Mangudang Underpass) | 망우당네거리 (망우당고가차도) | Hyodong-ro; Hyohaeng-ro | Daegu | Dong District | |
| Hwarang Bridge | 화랑교 | | Daegu | Dong District | |
| Yonggye Station Intercity Bus Stop | 용계역시외버스정류소 | | Daegu | Dong District | |
| East Daegu IC | 동대구 나들목 | Expressway 55 (Daegu-Busan Expressway) | Daegu | Dong District | |
| Banyawol IS | 반야월삼거리 | Dongchon-ro; Banyawol-ro | Daegu | Dong District | |
| Yulha Station (Yulha Station IS) | 율하역 (율하역 교차로) | Beoman-ro | Daegu | Dong District | |
| Anil Elementary School IS | 안일초교삼거리 | Yulhadong-ro 23-gil | Daegu | Dong District | |
| Singi Station (Ansim Jugong IS) | 신기역 (안심주공네거리) | Yulhadong-ro | Daegu | Dong District | |
| Ansim Middle School IS | 안심중삼거리 | Ansim-ro 41-gil | Daegu | Dong District | |
| Ansim Middle School | 안심중학교 | | Daegu | Dong District | |
| Banyawol Station (Banyawol IS) | 반야월역 (반야월네거리) | Gyeongan-ro | Daegu | Dong District | |
| Gaksan Station | 각산역 | Geumgang-ro | Daegu | Dong District | |
| Ansim Station (Songjeong IS) | 안심역 (송정삼거리) | Banyawol-ro | Daegu | Dong District | |
| Sabok-dong Entrance | 사복동입구 | Medibaelri-ro | Daegu | Dong District | |
| Sukcheon Bridge | 숙천교 | | Daegu | Dong District | Continuation into North Gyeongsang Province |

=== North Gyeongsang Province (East Daegu) ===
| Name | Hangul name | Connection | Location | | Note |
|---|---|---|---|---|---|
| Cheongcheon Station Cheongcheon Elementary School Hosan University | 청천역 청천초등학교 호산대학교 | | Gyeongsan City | Hayang-eup | Daegu - North Gyeongsang Province border line |
| Catholic University of Daegu | 대구가톨릭대학교 | Hayang-ro | Gyeongsan City | Hayang-eup | |
| Hayang Station | 하양역 | | Gyeongsan City | Hayang-eup | |
| Geumrak IS (Hayang Overpass) | 금락네거리 (하양고가도로) | Prefectural Route 69; Prefectural Route 919 (Daehak-ro) | Gyeongsan City | Hayang-eup | Prefectural Route 69 overlap |
| Dongseo IS | 동서 교차로 | Hayang-ro; Hansadeul-gil | Gyeongsan City | Hayang-eup | Prefectural Route 69 overlap |
| Ha Bridge | 하교 | | Gyeongsan City | Wachon-myeon | Prefectural Route 69 overlap |
| Gyodae IS | 교대사거리 | Prefectural Route 909 (Sail-ro) (Gyodae-gil) | Yeongcheon City | Geumho-eup | Prefectural Route 69 overlap |
| Geumho IS | 금호 교차로 | National Route 35 (Yeongcheon Bypass Road) | Yeongcheon City | Geumho-eup | National Route 35 overlap Prefectural Route 69 overlap |
| Naengcheon IS | 냉천 교차로 | Prefectural Route 69 (Geumho-ro) | Yeongcheon City | Geumho-eup | National Route 35 overlap Prefectural Route 69 overlap |
| Geumho Bridge | 금호대교 | | Yeongcheon City | Geumho-eup | National Route 35 overlap |
| Geumho Bridge | | | Yeongcheon City | Nambu-dong | National Route 35 overlap |
| Dodong IS | 도동 교차로 | Cheonmun-ro | Yeongcheon City | Nambu-dong | National Route 35 overlap |
| Bongjak IS | 봉작 교차로 | Yeongcheon IC-ro | Yeongcheon City | Nambu-dong | National Route 35 overlap |
| Jaksan IS | 작산 교차로 | Hanbang-ro; Jeongmo-gil; Joam-gil | Yeongcheon City | Nambu-dong | National Route 35 overlap |
| Yucheon Bridge | 유천대교 | | Yeongcheon City | Bukan-myeon | National Route 35 overlap |
| Bukan Complex IS | 북안공단 교차로 | Bukangongdan-gil | Yeongcheon City | Bukan-myeon | National Route 35 overlap |
| Banjeong IS | 반정 교차로 | Prefectural Route 921 (Unbuk-ro) | Yeongcheon City | Bukan-myeon | National Route 35 overlap |
| Bukan Tunnel | 북안터널 | | Yeongcheon City | Bukan-myeon | National Route 35 overlap Approximately 936m |
| Manbul IS | 만불 교차로 | Naeseo-ro | Yeongcheon City | Bukan-myeon | National Route 35 overlap |
| Hachu IS | 하추 교차로 | Naeseo-ro; Hwachon-gil | Gyeongju City | Seo-myeon | National Route 35 overlap |
| Ahwa IS | 아화 교차로 | Prefectural Route 909 (Simgok-ro) | Gyeongju City | Seo-myeon | National Route 35 overlap |
| Sara Bridge | 사라교 | Buunnyuljeon-gil; Sariundae-gil; Jangjagol-gil | Gyeongju City | Seo-myeon | National Route 35 overlap |
| North Geoncheon IC | 북건천 나들목 | National Route 20 (Geonposaneop-ro) | Gyeongju City | Geoncheon-eup | National Route 35 overlap |
| Cheonpo IS | 천포 교차로 | Naeseo-ro | Gyeongju City | Geoncheon-eup | National Route 35 overlap |
| No name | (이름 없음) | Yongmyeonggongdan-gil | Gyeongju City | Geoncheon-eup | National Route 35 overlap |
| Moryang Bridge | 모량교 | | Gyeongju City | Geoncheon-eup | National Route 35 overlap |
| Goran Bridge | 고란교 | Moryanggoran-gil | Gyeongju City | Geoncheon-eup | National Route 35 overlap |
| Moryang IS | 모량 교차로 | Naeseo-ro; Naenam - Oedong Motorway | Gyeongju City | Geoncheon-eup | National Route 35 overlap |
| Gocheon Bridge | 고천대교 | | Gyeongju City | Geoncheon-eup | National Route 35 overlap |
| Gocheon Bridge | | | Gyeongju City | Hwangnam-dong | National Route 35 overlap |
| Naenam IC | 내남 나들목 | Prefectural Route 904 (Naeoe-ro); Taejong-ro | Gyeongju City | Hwangnam-dong | National Route 35 overlap |
| Hyohyeon Bridge | 효현교 | | Gyeongju City | Hwangnam-dong | National Route 35 overlap |
| Hyohyeon Bridge | | | Gyeongju City | Seondo-dong | National Route 35 overlap |
| Sotigogae | 소티고개 | | Gyeongju City | Seondo-dong | National Route 35 overlap |
| Muyeolwangreung | 태종 무열왕릉 | | Gyeongju City | Seondo-dong | National Route 35 overlap |
| East of Seocheon Bridge | 서천교 서단 | Taejong-ro; Heungmu-ro | Gyeongju City | Seondo-dong | National Route 35 overlap |
| Seocheon Bridge | 서천교 | | Gyeongju City | Seondo-dong | National Route 35 overlap |
| Seocheon Bridge | | | Gyeongju City | Jungbu-dong | National Route 35 overlap |
| Terminal IS (Gyeongju Express Bus Terminal) | 터미널네거리 (경주고속버스터미널) | Gangbyeon-ro | Gyeongju City | Jungbu-dong | National Route 35 overlap |
| Seorabeol IS | 서라벌네거리 | Geumseong-ro | Gyeongju City | Jungbu-dong | National Route 35 overlap |
| Naenam IS (Daereungwon Tomb) | 내남네거리 (경주 대릉원) | National Route 35 (Poseok-ro) | Gyeongju City | Hwangnam-dong | National Route 35 overlap |
| Palujeong IS | 팔우정삼거리 | National Route 7 (Wonhwa-ro) | Gyeongju City | Hwango-dong | National Route 7 overlap |
| Seondeok IS | 선덕네거리 | National Route 7 (Wonhwa-ro); Cheomseong-ro | Gyeongju City | Wolseong-dong | National Route 7 overlap |
| Seondeok Girls' Middle School Seondeok Girls' High School | 선덕여자중학교 선덕여자고등학교 | | Gyeongju City | Wolseong-dong | |
| No name | (이름 없음) | Yangjeong-ro | Gyeongju City | Wolseong-dong | |
| Bunhwangsa | 분황사 | | Gyeongju City | Wolseong-dong | |
| No name | (이름 없음) | Alcheonnam-ro | Gyeongju City | Wolseong-dong | |
| Guhwang Bridge IS | 구황교네거리 | Saneop-ro | Gyeongju City | Wolseong-dong | |
| Bomun Bridge IS | 보문교삼거리 | Bomun-ro | Gyeongju City | Wolseong-dong | |
| Cheongun IS (Gyeongju World) | 천군네거리 (경주월드) | Bomun-ro | Gyeongju City | Bodeok-dong | |
| Bodeok-dong Community Center | 보덕동주민센터 | | Gyeongju City | Bodeok-dong | |
| Expo IS | 엑스포삼거리 | Expo-ro | Gyeongju City | Bodeok-dong | |
| Bobul-ro IS | 보불로삼거리 | Gyeonggam-ro | Gyeongju City | Bodeok-dong | |
| Daldongnae of Olden Times Gyeongju Dinosaur World Madong Bridge | 추억의달동네 경주공룡월드 마동교 | | Gyeongju City | Bulguk-dong | |
| (Tapma-eulap) | (탑마을앞) | Bulguk-ro | Gyeongju City | Bulguk-dong | |
| (Kolon Garden Golf Course) | (코오롱가든골프장) | Bulguk-ro | Gyeongju City | Bulguk-dong | |
| KT&G Gyeongju Training Center | KT&G 경주수련관 | | Gyeongju City | Bulguk-dong | |
| (Daedong Gas Station) | (대동주유소) | Yeongbul-ro | Gyeongju City | Bulguk-dong | |
| (Jinhyeon-dong) | (진현동) | Yeongbul-ro | Gyeongju City | Bulguk-dong | |
| Toamsan 1 Bridge | 토암산1교 | | Gyeongju City | Bulguk-dong | |
| Singye IS | 신계 교차로 | Jinhyeonsingye-gil | Gyeongju City | Wadong-eup | |
| Tohamsan 2 Bridge | 토함산2교 | | Gyeongju City | Wadong-eup | |
| Sangsin IS | 상신 교차로 | Singyesangsin-gil | Gyeongju City | Wadong-eup | |
| Tohamsan Tunnel | 토함산터널 | | Gyeongju City | Wadong-eup | Right tunnel: Approximately 4,345m Left tunnel: Approximately 4,300m |
| Tohamsan Tunnel | | | Gyeongju City | Yangbuk-myeon | Right tunnel: Approximately 4,345m Left tunnel: Approximately 4,300m |
| Janghang IS | 장항 교차로 | Bulguk-ro | Gyeongju City | Yangbuk-myeon | |
| Gamnamu Bridge Chukam Bridge | 감나무교 축암교 | | Gyeongju City | Yangbuk-myeon | |
| Andong IS | 안동 교차로 | Gyeonggam-ro | Gyeongju City | Yangbuk-myeon | |
| Andong Bridge Waeup Bridge | 안동교 와읍교 | | Gyeongju City | Yangbuk-myeon | |
| Waeup IS | 와읍 교차로 | National Route 14; Prefectural Route 929 (Gameun-ro) (Gyeonggam-ro) | Gyeongju City | Yangbuk-myeon | |
| Junggi Bridge | 중기교 | | Gyeongju City | Yangbuk-myeon | |
| Nodong IS | 노동 교차로 | Gyeonggam-ro | Gyeongju City | Gampo-eup | |
| Seocheon Bridge Paljo Bridge | 서천교 팔조교 | | Gyeongju City | Gampo-eup | |
| Paljo IS | 팔조 교차로 | Paljosuje-gil | Gyeongju City | Gampo-eup | |
| Seombi Bridge | 섬비교 | | Gyeongju City | Gampo-eup | |
| Gampo IS | 감포 교차로 | National Route 31 (Donghaean-ro) | Gyeongju City | Gampo-eup | National Route 31 overlap |
| Jeonchon IS | 전촌삼거리 | Gyeonggam-ro | Gyeongju City | Gampo-eup | Terminus |
