= Daejeon Southern Ring Expressway =

Road in South Korea

Expressway No.300
- Deajeon South Ring Expressway

Route information
- Length: 20.8 km (12.9 mi)
- Existed: 1999–present

Major junctions
- West end: W.Daejeon JC in Yuseong-gu, Daejeon; Honam Branch Expressway
- 4
- East end: Biryong JC in Dong-gu, Daejeon; Gyeongbu Expressway

Location
- Country: South Korea

Highway system
- Highway systems of South Korea; Expressways; National; Local

- Daejeon Southern Ring Expressway
- Hangul: 대전남부순환고속도로
- Hanja: 大田南部循環高速道路
- RR: Daejeon nambu sunhwan gosok doro
- MR: Taejŏn nambu sunhwan kosok toro

The Daejeon Southern Ring Expressway (Korean: 대전남부순환고속도로), Daejeon Nambu Sunhwan Expressway or Daejeon Southern Beltway is an expressway in South Korea, connecting Honam Expressway Branch (Expressway 251) to Gyeongbu Expressway (Expressway 1) in Daejeon. Numbered 300, it covers a length of 20.8 kilometers.

== History ==
- December 1993: Construction Begin.
- 6 September 1999: Opens to traffic.

== Composition ==
=== Lane ===
- 4 Lanes

=== Length ===
- 20.8 km

=== Limited Speed ===
- 100 km/h

== List of facilities ==
- IC: Interchange, JC: Junction, SA: Service Area, TG:Tollgate

No.	Name	Korean name	Hanja name	Connections	Notes	Location
1	W.Daejeon JC	서대전분기점	西大田分岐點	Honam Expressway Branch (Expressway 251)		Yuseong-gu, Daejeon
2	W.Daejeon IC	서대전나들목	西大田나들목	National Route 4		Seo-gu, Daejeon
3	Anyeong IC	안영나들목	安永나들목	Provincial Route 635		Jung-gu, Daejeon
4	Sannae JC	산내분기점	山內分岐點	Tongyeong–Daejeon Expressway (Expressway 35)		Dong-gu, Daejeon
5	Panam IC	판암나들목	板岩나들목	National Route 4		Dong-gu, Daejeon
6	Biryong JC	비룡분기점	飛龍分岐點	Gyeongbu Expressway (Expressway 1)		Dong-gu, Daejeon

== See also ==
- Transportation in South Korea
- Roads and expressways in South Korea
