= Cheonan Junction =

Road junction in Hoseo, South Korea

- 천안 분기점, 天安分岐點

Location
- Dongnam-gu, Cheonan, South Chungcheong, South Korea
- Coordinates: 36°46′07″N 127°10′57″E
- Roads at junction: Gyeongbu Expressway; Nonsan–Cheonan Expressway; Asan–Cheongju Expressway

Construction
- Type: Y-shape
- Constructed: by Korea Expressway Corporation
- Opened: December 23, 2002

Cheonan Junction (Korean: 천안 분기점; Hanja: 天安分岐點), shortly Cheonan JC, is a junction located in Dongnam-gu, Cheonan, South Chungcheong, South Korea. Gyeongbu Expressway (No. 1), Nonsan–Cheonan Expressway (No. 25), and Asan–Cheongju Expressway (No. 32) meet here. The type of junction is Y-shape junction. Asan–Cheongju Expressway will be opened, and Cheonan JC – Oksan JC segment will be overlapped with Gyeongbu Expressway and Asan–Cheongju Expressway in January 2018.

== Roads ==
Gyeongbu Expressway
toward Busan	←	38; Cheonan Junction	→	toward Seoul
37; Mokcheon IC; 3.53 km	←	38; Cheonan Junction	→	39; Cheonan IC; 6.70 km
Nonsan–Cheonan Expressway
toward Nonsan	←	37; Cheonan Junction	→	toward Cheonan
36; S. Cheonan IC; 2.44 km	←	37; Cheonan Junction	→	Ending point
Asan–Cheongju Expressway
toward Asan	←	no number Cheonan Junction	→	toward Cheongju
no number W. Cheonan IC not opened	←	no number Cheonan Junction	→	no number Mokcheon IC; 3.53 km

== History ==
- 23 December 2002 : It opened with Nonsan–Cheonan Expressway
- January 2018 : Asan–Cheongju Expressway will be opened to traffic.

== Location ==
- South Chungcheong Province
  - Cheonan
    - Dongnam-gu
      - Mokcheon-eup
        - Eungwon-ri
      - Samnyong-dong (Cheongnyong-dong)
