= Tongyeong–Daejeon Expressway =

Expressway in South Korea

Expressway No.35
- Tongyeong–Daejeon Expressway

Route information
- Existed: 1996–present

Location
- Country: South Korea

Highway system
- Highway systems of South Korea; Expressways; National; Local

- Tongyeong–Daejeon Expressway
- Hangul: 통영대전고속도로
- Hanja: 統營大田高速道路
- RR: Tongyeong Daejeon gosok doro
- MR: T'ongyŏng Taejŏn kosok toro

Expressway No.35: Tongyeong to Hanam

The Tongyeong–Daejeon Expressway (Korean: 통영대전고속도로) is an expressway in South Korea. It connects Tongyeong to Daejeon. The expressway's route number is 35, which it shares with the Jungbu Expressway. This expressway joins the Gyeongbu Expressway at Cheongju and they divide again at Daejeon.

== History ==
- March 1992 - Construction begins as Daejeon–Tongyeong Expressway
- 20 December 1996 - Jinju-West Jinju segment opens to traffic.
- 22 October 1998 - West Jinju-Hamyang segment opens to traffic.
- 6 September 1999 - Sannae-Biryong segment opens to traffic.
- 22 December 2000 - Muju-Sannae segment opens to traffic.
- August 2001 - Numbered 35, which it shares with the Jungbu Expressway.
- 29 November 2001 - Hamyang-Muju segment opens to traffic.
- December 2002 - Renamed to Tongyeong–Daejeon Expressway
- 14 December 2005 - Tongyeong-Jinju segment opens to traffic.

== List of facilities ==
- IC: Interchange, JC: Junction, SA: Service Area, TG: Tollgate

No.	Name	Korean name	Hanja name	Connections	Notes	Location
1	Tongyeong IC	통영나들목	統營나들목	National Route 14	Expressway Begin	Tongyeong, Gyeongsangnam-do
TG	Tongyeong TG	통영요금소	統營料金所			
2	N. Tongyeong IC	북통영나들목	北統營나들목	National Route 14, National Route 77		
3	E. Goseong IC	동고성나들목	東固城나들목	Local Route 1009		Goseong, Gyeongsangnam-do
4	Goseong IC	고성나들목	固城나들목	National Route 14		
SA	Goseong Dinosaur Park SA	고성공룡나라휴게소	固城恐龍나라休憩所			
5	Yeonhwasan IC	연화산나들목	蓮花山나들목	Local Route 30, Local Route 1002, Local Route 1009		
6	Jinju JC	진주분기점	晉州分岐點	Namhae Expressway (Expressway Route 10)		Jinju, Gyeongsangnam-do
7	W. Jinju IC	서진주나들목	西晉州나들목	National Route 2, National Route 3		
8	Danseong IC	단성나들목	丹城나들목	National Route 20		Sancheong, Gyeongsangnam-do
SA	Sancheong SA	산청휴게소	山淸休憩所			
9	Sancheong IC	산청나들목	山淸나들목	National Route 59, Local Route 60		
10	Saengcho IC	생초나들목	生草나들목	National Route 3		
11	Hamyang JC	함양분기점	咸陽分岐點	88 Olympic Expressway (Expressway Route 12)		Hamyang, Gyeongsangnam-do
SA	Hamyang SA	함양휴게소	咸陽休憩所			
12	Jigok IC	지곡나들목	池谷나들목	National Route 24		
13	Seosang IC	서상나들목	西上나들목	National Route 26		
14	Jangsu JC	장수분기점	長水分岐點	Iksan–Pohang Expressway (Expressway Route 20)		Jangsu, Jeollabuk-do
SA	Deogyusan SA	덕유산휴게소	德裕山休憩所			Muju, Jeollabuk-do
15	Deogyusan IC	덕유산나들목	德裕山나들목	National Route 19, Local Route 727		
16	Muju IC	무주나들목	茂朱나들목	National Route 19, National Route 30, National Route 37		
17	Geumsan IC	금산나들목	錦山나들목	Local Route 68		Geumsan, Chungcheongnam-do
SA	Insam Land SA	인삼랜드휴게소	人蔘랜드休憩所			
18	Chubu IC	추부나들목	秋富나들목	National Route 17, National Route 37		
19	S. Daejeon IC	남대전나들목	南大田나들목	National Route 17		Dong-gu, Daejeon
20	Sannae JC	산내분기점	山內分岐點	Daejeon Nambu Sunhwan Expressway (Expressway Route 300)		
21	Panam IC	판암나들목	板岩나들목	National Route 4		
22	Biryong JC	비룡분기점	飛龍分岐點	Gyeongbu Expressway (Expressway Route 1)	Join to Gyeongbu Expressway	

- Nami (Cheongju) ~ Hanam (East Seoul) segment's name is Jungbu Expressway.

== See also ==
- Transport in South Korea
