= Honam Expressway Branch =

Expressway in South Korea

Expressway No.251
- Honam Expressway Branch Line 호남고속도로지선

Route information
- Length: 58.5 km (36.4 mi)
- Existed: 1970–present

Major junctions
- South end: Nonsan, Chungnam
- North end: Daedeok, Daejeon

Location
- Country: South Korea

Highway system
- Highway systems of South Korea; Expressways; National; Local

- Honam Expressway Branch
- Hangul: 호남고속도로지선
- Hanja: 湖南高速道路支線
- RR: Honam gosok doro jiseon
- MR: Honam kosok toro chisŏn

The Honam Expressway Branch (Korean: 호남고속도로지선) is an expressway in South Korea, connecting Nonsan to Daejeon. The expressway's route number is 251.

This route was origin way of Honam Expressway until August 2001.

== History ==
- September 28, 2001 : Gyeryong IC open
- July 25, 2013 : Yangchon Hi-pass IC open

== Compositions ==
=== Lanes ===
- 4

=== Length ===
- 53.97 km

=== Speed limits ===
- 100 km/h

== List of facilities ==
- IC: Interchange, JC: Junction, SA: Service Area, TG:Tollgate

No.	Name	Korean name	Hanja name	Connections	Distance		Notes	Location	
Connected directly with Honam Expressway, Nonsan–Cheonan Expressway
1	Nonsan JC	논산분기점	論山分岐點	Honam Expressway Nonsan-Cheonan Expressway	-	0.00		Nonsan	Chungnam
2	Nonsan IC	논산나들목	論山나들목	Local Route 68	5.52	5.52		Nonsan	Chungnam
2-1	Yangchon Hi-pass IC	양촌(하이패스)나들목	陽村나들목	Local Route 68	9.85	15.37	Hi-pass Only	Nonsan	Chungnam
SA	Beolgok SA	벌곡휴게소	筏谷休憩所					Nonsan	Chungnam
3	Gyeryong IC	계룡나들목	鷄龍나들목	National Route 1 National Route 4 Gyeryong-daero	12.58	27.95		Gyeryong	Chungnam
4	W.Daejeon JC	서대전분기점	西大田岐點	Daejeon Southern Ring Expressway	6.43	34.38		Yuseong	Daejeon
5	Yuseong IC	유성나들목	儒城나들목	National Route 32; World Cup-daero	8.43	42.81		Yuseong	Daejeon
6	Yuseong JC	유성분기점	儒城分岐點	Dangjin-Yeongdeok Expressway	2.89	45.70		Yuseong	Daejeon
7	N.Daejeon IC (Daedeok Valley)	북대전나들목	北大田나들목	Local Route 32	4.61	50.31	near of Daedeok Valley	Yuseong	Daejeon
8	Hoedeok JC	회덕분기점	懷德分岐點	Gyeongbu Expressway( AH 1)	3.66	53.97		Yuseong	Daejeon

== See also ==
- Roads and expressways in South Korea
- Transportation in South Korea
