= Park Myung-keun =

South Korean politician (1928–2004)

- 박명근

Member of the Korean National Assembly

Personal details
- Born: September 7, 1928 Hashū, Keiki Province, Korea, Empire of Japan
- Died: December 9, 2004 (aged 76) Seoul, South Korea
- Children: 5 daughters and 1 son
- Education: Seoul National University

Military service
- Allegiance: South Korea
- Branch/service: Army
- Rank: Captain
- Battles/wars: The Korean War

Park Myung-keun (Korean: 박명근; Hanja: 朴命根; September 7, 1928 – December 9, 2004) was a former South Korean Army captain, prosecutor, and a member of the 8th, 9th, 10th, and 14th South Korean National Assembly. He represented the Democratic Republican Party for his first three terms and the Democratic Libertarian Party for his last term. Under the Park Chung Hee administration, he worked as the chief of the Office of the President (大統領秘書室) and the Vice Leader of the Democratic Republican Party.

== Early life and education ==
Park was born on September 7, 1928, in 199th district, Yeongtae-ri, Wollong-myeon, Paju, Korea, Empire of Japan. He was the only son of Park Seung-nyun and Kim Jong-sun. When he was two years old, his father died.

After graduating from high school, he received a degree in political science from Seoul National University.

Park was fluent in Japanese.

== Political career ==
When Park was a secretary to President Park Chung Hee, he was known to be one of the President's favorites. Some of the largest projects under the administration in which Park had an instrumental role included the construction of the Gyeongbu Expressway, the most used highway in the country, where he worked with his close friend Chung Ju-yung, the founder of Hyundai Group.

== Death and funeral ==
Park died on December 9, 2004, at Samsung Medical Center. The funeral was held on the 11th at 8 a.m. He is survived by his wife and children.

=== Monument construction ===
In early 2008, the 14-member "Monument Construction Committee" (송덕비 건립추진위원회) was found. The committee was headed by Kim Chul-young, who was a former town mayor of Moon-san.

In December 14, 2008, the monument unveiling ceremony was held. The ceremony was attended by over hundred people, including members of the National Assembly, the mayor of Paju, the representative of the Gyeonggi Province, members of the provincial council of Gyeonggi, the chair of the Gyeonggi department of education, and the alderman. The monument was funded by donations.

Below is the text engraved on the monument, written by Song Dal-yong, who was a former mayor of Paju, and engraved by Lim Jae-cheol. The text is written in Korean mixed script.

先生은 1982年 9月 7日 京畿道 坡州郡 月籠面 英太里 199番地에서 父, 朴承年 氏와 母, 金鐘善 女史의 외아들로 태어났다.

어려서부터 聰明하고 意志가 굳세며 남다른 氣像과 大望을 품고 成長하면서 서울大學校 文理科大學 政治外交學科에 在學中 1950年 韓國戰爭이 勃發하자 學徒兵으로 參戰하여 銀星式功花郞勳章을 받는 빛나는 戰果를 올린 후 陸軍大尉로 豫編하였다.

先生은 1957年 公職을 始作하여 審計院(現 監査院). 財務部, 經濟企劃院을 거쳐 1967年 靑瓦臺 農林·建設擔富秘書官으로 朴正熙 大統領을 補佐하면서 우리나라 經濟發展의 大動脈인 京釜高速道路와 食糧 自給自足의 기틀을 만드는 데 中樞的 役割을 하였다.

先生은 보다 높은 理想을 가지고 國家發展에 奉仕하겠다는 信念으로 政界에 投身하여 1971年 故鄕인 坡州에서 第8代 國會議員으로 當選된 以來 9代, 10代, 14代의 4選 議員을 지냈다. 國會議員으로 活動하는 동안 國會 豫算決算委員會 委員長으로서 나라 살림을 구석구석까지 챙기는 責務를 다했다. 特히 故鄕 坡州를 남다른 愛着心을 가지고 農民의 所得增大를 爲해서는 가뭄과 洪水에서 벗어나는 것이 最優先策이라 生覺하고 豊富한 臨津江 물을 利用한 臨津地區 農業綜合 開發計劃 構想을 政府에 强力히 建議한 結果 1975年부터 8年間에 걸쳐 內資 363億 원과, 外資 109億 원을 投資하여 耕地整理를 비롯한 揚水, 排水場施設, 堤防工事 等으로 가뭄과 洪水 없는 肥沃한 農地를 만들어 農民의 所得增大는 勿論 生活基盤이 劣惡하고 落後된 農村의 生活環境을 改善하기 爲하여 接敵地區 開發事業, 基地村 整備事業, 統一路 周邊 整備事業, 廣域上水道事業을 政府가 投資하도록 誘導하여 坡州를 살기 좋은 고장으로 탈바꿈하는데 至大한 貢獻을 하였다. 한때, 大韓投資信託株式會社 社長으로 在任하는 동안 故鄕 젊은이들이 經濟界와 各界要路에 進出할 수 있도록 일자리 創出에도 獻身的인 勞力을 아끼지 않았다.

先生의 爲國忠情과 故鄕 坡州에 對한 熱情的인 사랑으로 이루어 낸 크고 작은 功德을 이루 헤아릴 수 없으나 그 業績을 記錄으로 남겨 後代에 傳하지 못하는 아쉬움이 있을 뿐이다.

先生이 2004年 12月 9日 77才를 一期로 그토록 사랑했던 아내와 愛之重之 키워온 子息들과 同苦同樂했던 先後輩, 同僚들을 남겨 두고 떠난 지도 어언 4年이란 歲月이 흘렀으나 아직도 그분의 情趣가 우리 곁을 맴돌고 있어 그 崇高한 精神과 功德을 後世에 傳하고 싶어 당신을 좋아했던 사람들의 작은 精誠을 모아 이에 碑를 세우는 바이다.

2008年 12月 14日

牛步 宋達鏞 지음

雲巖 林濟喆 씀

— Song Dal-yong
