= Pangyo Junction =

Road junction in Korea

- 판교 분기점, 板橋分岐點

Location
- Bundang-gu and Sujeong-gu, Seongnam, Gyeonggi, South Korea
- Coordinates: 37°24′20.96″N 127°5′41.39″E
- Roads at junction: Gyeongbu Expressway ( AH 1); Seoul Ring Expressway

Construction
- Type: Changed Y interchange
- Constructed: by Korea Expressway Corporation
- Opened: October 31, 1991

Pangyo Junction (Korean: 판교 분기점; Hanja: 板橋分岐點), also known as Pangyo JC, is a junction located in Bundang-gu and Sujeong-gu, Seongnam, Gyeonggi, South Korea. It serves as the meeting point of Gyeongbu Expressway (No. 1) and Seoul Ring Expressway (No. 100). It is named after the new town in which it is located, Pangyo. The type of junction is Changed Y interchange.
