= Capital Region First Ring Expressway =

Expressway in South Korea

Expressway No.100
- Capital Region First Ring Expressway 수도권제1순환고속도로

Route information
- Length: 128.02 km (79.55 mi)
- Existed: 1992–present

Major junctions
- Beltway around Seoul
- Cycle end: Pangyo JC in Seongnam, Gyeonggi Province; Gyeongbu Expressway
- 33
- Cycle end: Pangyo JC in Seongnam, Gyeonggi Province; Gyeongbu Expressway

Location
- Country: South Korea
- Major cities: Seongnam, Hanam, Guri, Uijeongbu, Goyang, Gimpo, Incheon, Bucheon, Siheung, Anyang

Highway system
- Highway systems of South Korea; Expressways; National; Local

- Capital Region First Ring Expressway
- Hangul: 수도권제1순환고속도로
- Hanja: 首都圈第一循環高速道路
- RR: Sudogwon je1 sunhwan gosok doro
- MR: Sudokwŏn che1 sunhwan kosok toro

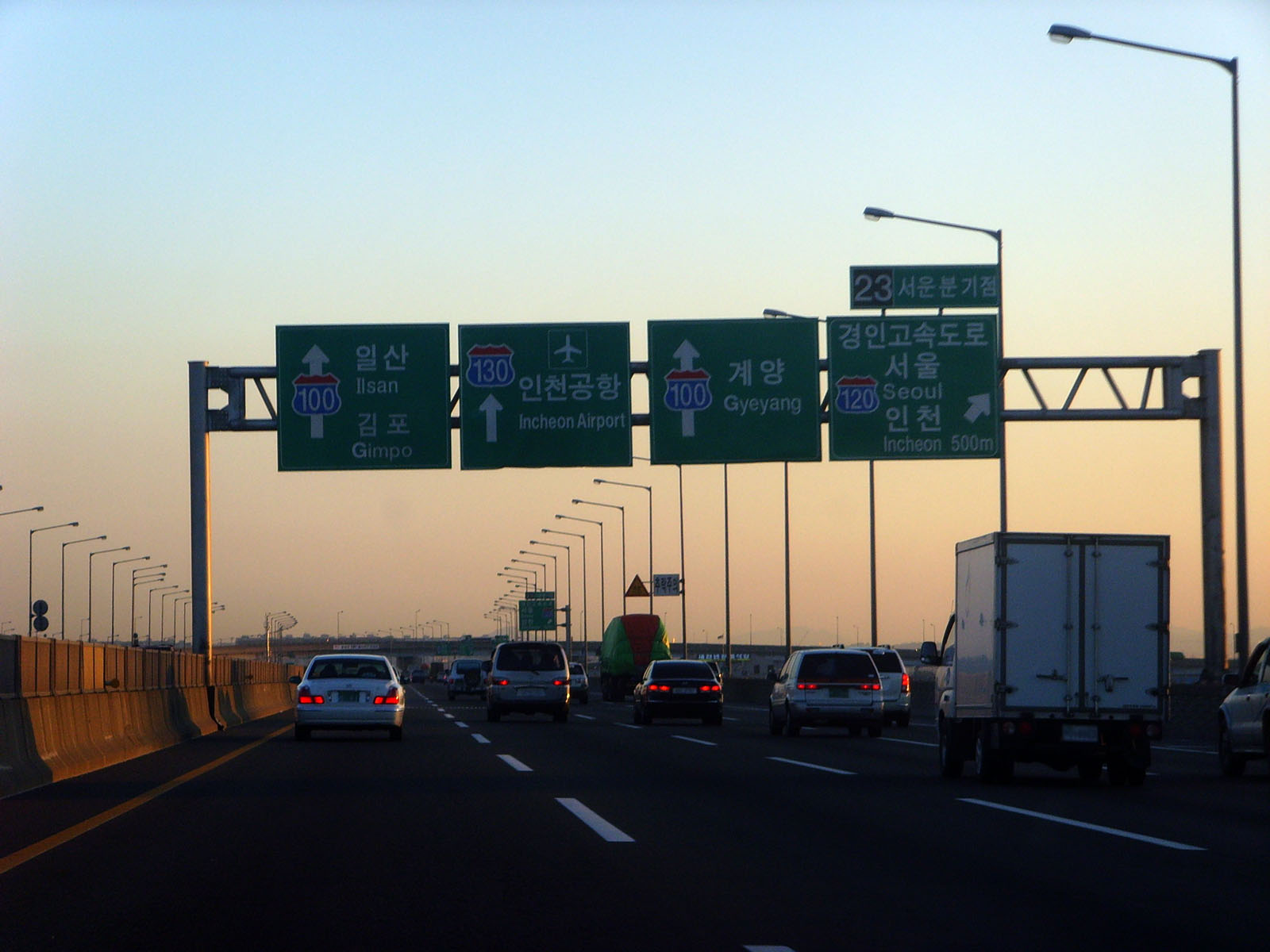
Seoun Junction, 2008

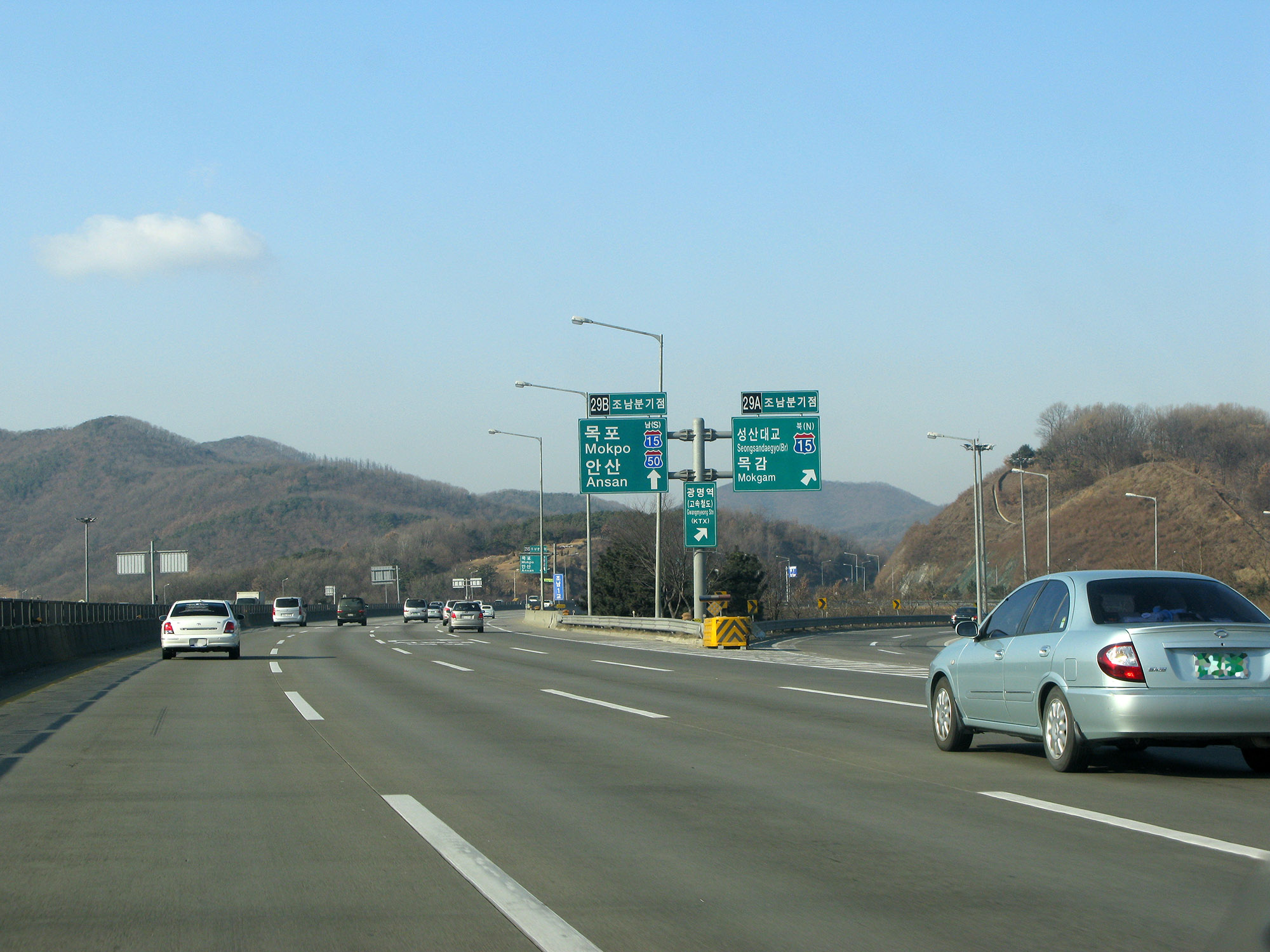
Jonam Junction, 2009

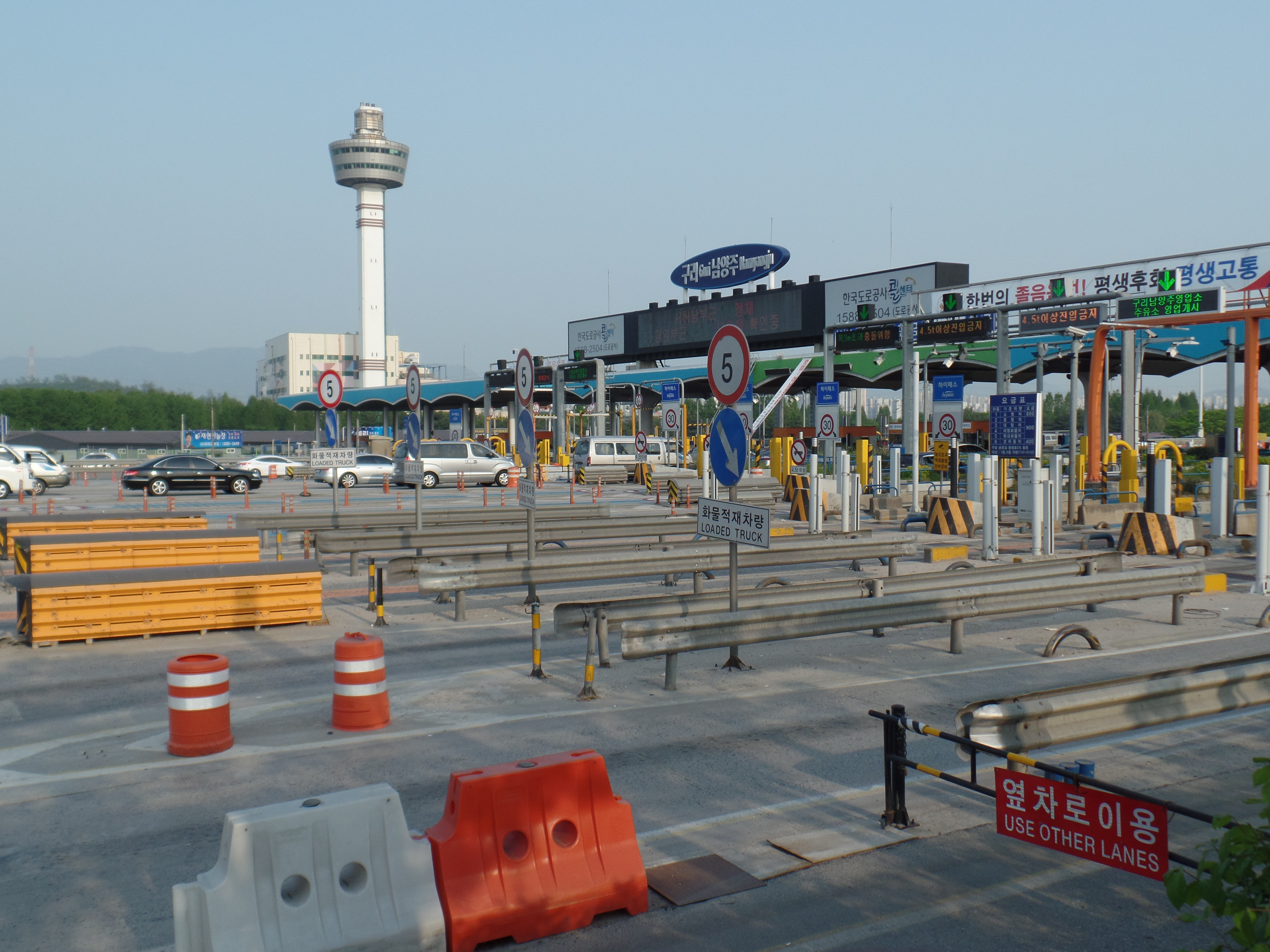
Guri-Namyangju Tollgate, 2017

The Capital Region First Ring Expressway (Formerly as Seoul Ring Expressway) (Expressway No.100) (Korean: 수도권제1순환고속도로) is an expressway, circular beltway or ring road around Seoul, South Korea. It connects satellite cities around Seoul, Ilsan, Namyangju, Hanam, Pyeongchon, Jungdong, Bundang, Pangyo, Sanbon and Gimpo. The expressway runs 127.6 km. Seoul Ring Expressway is currently under construction to widen the expressway between Anhyeon Junction to Seongnam which is expected to be finished in 2016.

Since 2010, Gyeonggi Loop Bus connects the many Satellite towns to each other through this Expressway.

== History ==
- February 1988: Construction begins from Pangyo to Toegyewon.
- 29 November 1991: Section from Pangyo to Toegyewon opens to traffic.
- December 1991: Construction begins from Sanbon to Pangyo.
- May 1992: Construction begins from Seoun to Jangsu.
- December 1992: Construction begins from Ilsan to Gimpo.
- June 1995: Construction begins from Gimpo to Seoun and from Jangsu to Sanbon.
- 28 December 1995: Section from Pangyo to Sanbon opens to traffic.
- 3 November 1997: Section from Gimpo to Jayuro opens to traffic.
- 24 July 1998: Section from Seoun to Jangsu opens to traffic.
- 26 November 1999: Sections from Jangsu to Sanbon and from Gimpo to Seoun open to traffic.
- 11 September 2001: Section from Ilsan to Jayuro opens to traffic.
- 30 June 2006: Sections from Ilsan to Songchu and from Uijeongbu to Toegyewon open to traffic.
- 28 December 2007: Section from Songchu to Uijeongbu opens to traffic.
- 3 May 2010: Dori JC opens to traffic.
- 28 May 2015: Howon IC opens to traffic.
- Winter 2015: Road expansion construction
- September 1, 2020: The Seoul Ring Expressway is renamed Capital Region First Ring Expressway.

== Composition ==
=== Lanes ===
- Hanam JC~Gangil IC, Ilsan IC~Jayuro (Rigid Pavement) IC: 10
- Gangil JC~Ilsan IC, Jayuro IC~Hanam-Jirisan Mountain-Seongsan (Rigid Pavement) (68 km) (42.25 mi) JC: 8

=== Length ===
- 128.02 km

=== Limited Speed ===
- 100 km/h

=== Tunnel ===
| Name | Korean name | Location | Length | Date of Completion | Notes |
|---|---|---|---|---|---|
| Gwangam Tunnel(Guri) | 광암터널(구리) | Hanam, Gyeonggi-do | 726m | 2002 | |
| Gwangam Tunnel(Pangyo1) | 광암터널(판교1) | Hanam, Gyeonggi-do | 743m | 1991 | |
| Gwangam Tunnel(Pangyo2) | 광암터널(판교2) | Hanam, Gyeonggi-do | 752m | 1991 | |
| Buramsan Tunnel(Ilsan) | 불암산터널(일산) | Nowon, Seoul | 1,685m | 2006 | |
| Buramsan Tunnel(Guri) | 불암산터널(구리) | Nowon, Seoul | 1,665m | 2006 | |
| Suraksan Tunnel | 수락산터널 | Uijeongbu, Gyeonggi-do | 2,950m | 2006 | |
| Howon Tunnel(Ilsan) | 호원터널(일산) | Uijeongbu, Gyeonggi-do | 180m | 2007 | |
| Howon Tunnel(Guri) | 호원터널(구리) | Uijeongbu, Gyeonggi-do | 149m | 2007 | |
| Sapaesan Tunnel(Ilsan) | 사패산터널(일산) | Yangju, Gyeonggi-do | 3,997m | 2007 | |
| Sapaesan Tunnel(Guri) | 사패산터널(구리) | Yangju, Gyeonggi-do | 3,993m | 2007 | |
| Nogosan 1 Tunnel(Ilsan) | 노고산1터널(일산) | Yangju, Gyeonggi-do | 2,177m | 2006 | |
| Nogosan 1 Tunnel(Guri) | 노고산1터널(구리) | Yangju, Gyeonggi-do | 2,197m | 2006 | |
| Nogosan 2 Tunnel(Ilsan) | 노고산2터널(일산) | Yangju, Gyeonggi-do | 975m | 2006 | |
| Nogosan 2 Tunnel(Guri) | 노고산2터널(구리) | Yangju, Gyeonggi-do | 995m | 2006 | |
| Sorae Tunnel(Pangyo) | 소래터널(판교) | Siheung, Gyeonggi-do | 421m | 1999 | |
| Sorae Tunnel(Ilsan) | 소래터널(일산) | Siheung, Gyeonggi-do | 446m | 1999 | |
| Suam Tunnel(Pangyo) | 수암터널(판교) | Anyang, Gyeonggi-do | 1,254m | 1999 | |
| Suam Tunnel(Ilsan) | 수암터널(일산) | Anyang, Gyeonggi-do | 1,294m | 1999 | |
| Suri Tunnel(Pangyo) | 수리터널(판교) | Gunpo, Gyeonggi-do | 1,865m | 1999 | |
| Suri Tunnel(Ilsan) | 수리터널(일산) | Gunpo, Gyeonggi-do | 1,882m | 1999 | |
| Anyang Tunnel | 안양터널 | Anyang, Gyeonggi-do | 390m | 1996 | |
| Cheonggye Tunnel(Pangyo) | 청계터널(판교) | Uiwang, Gyeonggi-do | 550m | 1995 | |
| Cheonggye Tunnel(Ilsan) | 청계터널(일산) | Uiwang, Gyeonggi-do | 450m | 1995 | |

== List of Facilities ==
- IC: Interchange, JC: Junction, SA: Service Area, TG:Tollgate

| No. | Name | Korean name | Hanja name | Connections | Distance | | Notes | Location | |
|---|---|---|---|---|---|---|---|---|---|
| 1 | Pangyo JC | 판교분기점 | 板橋分岐點 | Gyeongbu Expressway( AH 1) | - | 0.00 | Busan-bound Only | Seongnam | Gyeonggi |
| 2 | Seongnam IC | 성남나들목 | 城南나들목 | National Route 3 Moran station ( Line 8, Suin–Bundang) | 4.16 | 4.16 | | Seongnam | Gyeonggi |
| TG | Seongnam TG | 성남요금소 | 城南料金所 | | | | Main Tollgate | Seongnam | Gyeonggi |
| 3 | Songpa IC | 송파나들목 | 松坡나들목 | National Route 3 Local Route 342; Heolleung-ro(헌릉로); Wiryejungang-ro(위례중앙로); Suseo Station ( Line 3, Suin–Bundang); Bokjeong station ( Line 8, Suin–Bundang) | 5.20 | 9.36 | | Songpa | Seoul |
| 4 | W. Hanam IC | 서하남나들목 | 西河南나들목 | Gangdong-daero (Seoul City Route 60); Dunchon Oryun station ( Line 9) | 5.00 | 14.36 | | Hanam | Gyeonggi |
| 4-1 | W. Hanam JC | 서하남분기점 | 西河南分岐點 | Sejong-Pocheon Expressway | | | | Hanam | Gyeonggi |
| SA | Seohanam SA | 하남휴게소 | 西河南休憩所 | | | | Pangyo-bound Only | Hanam | Gyeonggi |
| 5 | Hanam JC | 하남분기점 | 河南分岐點 | Jungbu Expressway | 4.96 | 19.32 | | Hanam | Gyeonggi |
| 6 | Sangil IC | 상일나들목 | 上一나들목 | National Route 43 (Jojeong-daero-Cheonho-daero); Seoul City Route 50 (Cheonho-daero); Sangil-dong station ( Line 5) | 2.53 | 21.85 | | Gangdong | Seoul |
| 7 | Gangil IC | 강일 나들목 | 江一나들목 | Seoul-Yangyang Expressway; Olympicdaero | 3.04 | 24.89 | | Gangdong | Seoul |
| BR | Gangdong Bridge | 강동대교 | 江東大橋 | | | | | Gangdong | Seoul |
| 8 | Topyeong IC | 토평나들목 | 土坪나들목 | National Route 6 Gangbyeonbuk-ro | 0.99 | 25.88 | | Guri | Gyeonggi |
| TG | Guri·Namyangju TG | 구리·남양주요금소 | 九里·南楊州料金所 | | | | Main Tollgate | Guri | Gyeonggi |
| 9 | Namyangju IC | 남양주나들목 | 南楊州나들목 | National Route 6 Guri station ( Gyeongui·Jungang) | 2.40 | 28.28 | | Namyangju | Gyeonggi |
| 10 | Guri IC | 구리나들목 | 九里나들목 | National Route 43; National Route 46; Bukbu Urban Expressway | 1.90 | 30.18 | | Guri | Gyeonggi |
| SA | Guri SA | 구리휴게소 | 九里休憩所 | | | | Uijeongbu-bound Only | Guri | Gyeonggi |
| 12 | Toegyewon IC | 퇴계원나들목 | 退溪院나들목 | National Route 43; National Route 46; National Route 47; Byeollae station ( Gyeongchun) | 2.73 | 32.91 | | Namyangju | Gyeonggi |
| TG | Buramsan TG | 불암산요금소 | 佛巖山料金所 | | | | Main Tollgate | Namyangju | Gyeonggi |
| 13 | Byeollae IC | 별내나들목 | 別內나들목 | Buram-ro(불암로) | 2.39 | 35.30 | | Namyangju | Gyeonggi |
| 14 | Uijeongbu IC | 의정부나들목 | 議政府나들목 | National Route 3 Dongbu Urban Expressway; Jangam station ( Line 7) | 7.30 | 42.60 | | Uijeongbu | Gyeonggi |
| 14-1 | Howon IC | 호원나들목 | 虎院나들목 | National Route 3 Seobu-ro(서부로) | 1.60 | 44.20 | | Uijeongbu | Gyeonggi |
| TN | Sapaesan TN | 사패산터널 | 賜牌山터널 | | | | World's Largest; Double-width Tunnel; L=3,997m | Uijeongbu | Gyeonggi |
| 15 | Songchu IC | 송추나들목 | 松楸나들목 | National Route 39; Bukhansan-ro(북한산로) | 6.20 | 50.40 | | Yangju | Gyeonggi |
| TG | Yangju TG | 양주요금소 | 楊州料金所 | | | | Main Tollgate | Yangju | Gyeonggi |
| 16 | Tongilro IC | 통일로나들목 | 統一路나들목 | National Route 1 (Tongil-ro / 통일로) | 9.20 | 59.60 | | Goyang | Gyeonggi |
| 16-1 | Goyang JC | 고양분기점 | 高陽分岐點 | Pyeongtaek–Paju Expressway (Seoul-Munsan) | | | | Goyang | Gyeonggi |
| 17 | Goyang IC | 고양나들목 | 高陽나들목 | Local Route 356; Goyang City Hall; Wondang station ( Line 3) | 7.40 | 67.00 | | Goyang | Gyeonggi |
| 18 | Ilsan IC | 일산나들목 | 一山나들목 | Goyang Jungang-ro(고양 중앙로); Daegok station ( Line 3, Gyeongui·Jungang) | 2.97 | 69.97 | | Goyang | Gyeonggi |
| 19 | Jayuro IC | 자유로나들목 | 自由路나들목 | National Route 77 (Jayu-ro / 자유로) | 2.21 | 72.18 | | Goyang | Gyeonggi |
| BR | Gimpo Bridge | 김포대교 | 金浦大橋 | | | | | Gimpo | Gyeonggi |
| 20 | Gimpo IC | 김포나들목 | 金浦나들목 | National Route 48 | 3.11 | 75.29 | | Gimpo | Gyeonggi |
| TG | Gimpo TG | 김포요금소 | 金浦料金所 | | | | Main Tollgate | Gimpo | Gyeonggi |
| 21 | No-oji JC | 노오지분기점 | 老梧地分岐點 | Incheon Int'l Airport Expressway | 3.75 | 79.04 | Incheon Airport-bound Only | Gyeyang | Incheon |
| 22 | Gyeyang IC | 계양나들목 | 桂陽나들목 | National Route 39; Imhak station (● Incheon Line 1) | 3.02 | 82.06 | | Gyeyang | Incheon |
| 23 | Seoun JC | 서운분기점 | 瑞雲分岐點 | Gyeongin Expressway | 2.25 | 84.31 | | Gyeyang | Incheon |
| 24 | Jungdong IC | 중동나들목 | 中洞나들목 | Gilju-ro(길주로); Sangdong station ( Line 7); Sangdong Lake Park; Incheon Samsan World Stadium | 2.08 | 86.39 | | Bucheon | Gyeonggi |
| 25 | Songnae IC | 송내나들목 | 松內나들목 | National Route 46; Songnae station ( Line 1) | 2.02 | 88.41 | | Bucheon | Gyeonggi |
| 26 | Jangsu IC | 장수나들목 | 長壽나들목 | National Route 39; Yeongdong Expressway; Incheon Grand Park; Munemi-ro(무네미로) | 2.41 | 90.82 | | Namdong | Incheon |
| 27 | Siheung IC | 시흥나들목 | 始興나들목 | National Route 39 | 4.21 | 95.03 | | Siheung | Gyeonggi |
| TG | Siheung TG | 시흥요금소 | 始興料金所 | | | | Main Tollgate | Siheung | Gyeonggi |
| 28 | Anhyeong JC | 안현분기점 | 鞍峴分岐點 | 2nd Gyeongin Expressway | 2.66 | 97.69 | | Siheung | Gyeonggi |
| 28-1 | Dori JC | 도리분기점 | 道理分岐點 | 3rd Gyeongin Highway (Local Route 330) | 4.81 | 102.50 | | Siheung | Gyeonggi |
| SA | Siheung Sky SA | 시흥하늘휴게소 | 始興海底休憩所 | | | | | Siheung | Gyeonggi |
| 29 | Jonam JC | 조남분기점 | 鳥南分岐點 | Seohaean Expressway | 4.44 | 106.94 | | Siheung | Gyeonggi |
| 30 | Sanbon IC | 산본나들목 | 山本나들목 | National Route 47; Gunpo City Hall; Sanbon station ( Line 4) | 5.27 | 112.21 | | Gunpo | Gyeonggi |
| 31 | Pyeongchon IC | 평촌나들목 | 平村나들목 | National Route 1 National Route 47; Anyang City Hall; Beomgye station ( Line 4) | 4.13 | 116.34 | | Anyang | Gyeonggi |
| 32 | Hagui JC | 학의분기점 | 鶴儀分岐點 | Gwacheon-Bongdam Highway (Local Route 309) | 2.86 | 119.20 | | Uiwang | Gyeonggi |
| SA | Uiwang-Cheonggye SA | 의왕청계휴게소 | 義王淸溪休憩所 | | | | | Uiwang | Gyeonggi |
| TG | Cheonggye TG | 청계요금소 | 淸溪料金所 | | | | Main Tollgate | Uiwang | Gyeonggi |
| 1 | Pangyo JC | 판교분기점 | 板橋分岐點 | Gyeongbu Expressway( AH 1) | 8.82 | 128.02 | Busan-bound Only | Seongnam | Gyeonggi |
Connected directly to Seongnam IC(Cycle Line)

== See also ==
- Roads and expressways in South Korea
- Transportation in South Korea
