= Beonyeong-ro (Busan) =

Road in South Korea

Busan Metropolitan City Route 11
- Beonyeong-ro Road

Route information
- Part of AH 1

Location
- Country: South Korea

Highway system
- Highway systems of South Korea; Expressways; National; Local

- Beonyeong-ro
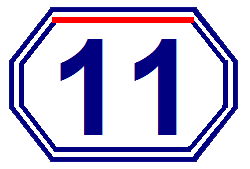

Korean name
- Hangul: 번영로
- Hanja: 繁榮路
- RR: Beonyeong-ro
- MR: Pŏnyŏng-ro

The Beonyeong-ro Road (Korean: 번영로; Hanja: 繁榮路; Asian Highway Network AH 1) is an urban expressway in Busan, Korea. It is the 1st urban expressway in South Korea. It constructed from May 1977 to October 1980, from Busan Harbor to Guseo IC, on Gyeongbu Expressway: runs north and south and the length is about 15.7 km (9.8 mi).

It begins at 4th Pier in Dong-gu, Busan and it ends at Guseo IC in Geumjeong-gu, Busan. It was toll road but now you can run this road no charge from January 2004.

It touches with Gyeongbu Expressway and National Route 7. So you can approach downtown in Busan rapidly.

It is on the Asian Highway Network AH 1. To south, you can go to Japan by ferry and to north, you can go to Gyeongbu Expressway.

Friend was filmed at Chungjang Elevated Road on this road: in Dong-gu, Busan.

== Interchange and Junction ==
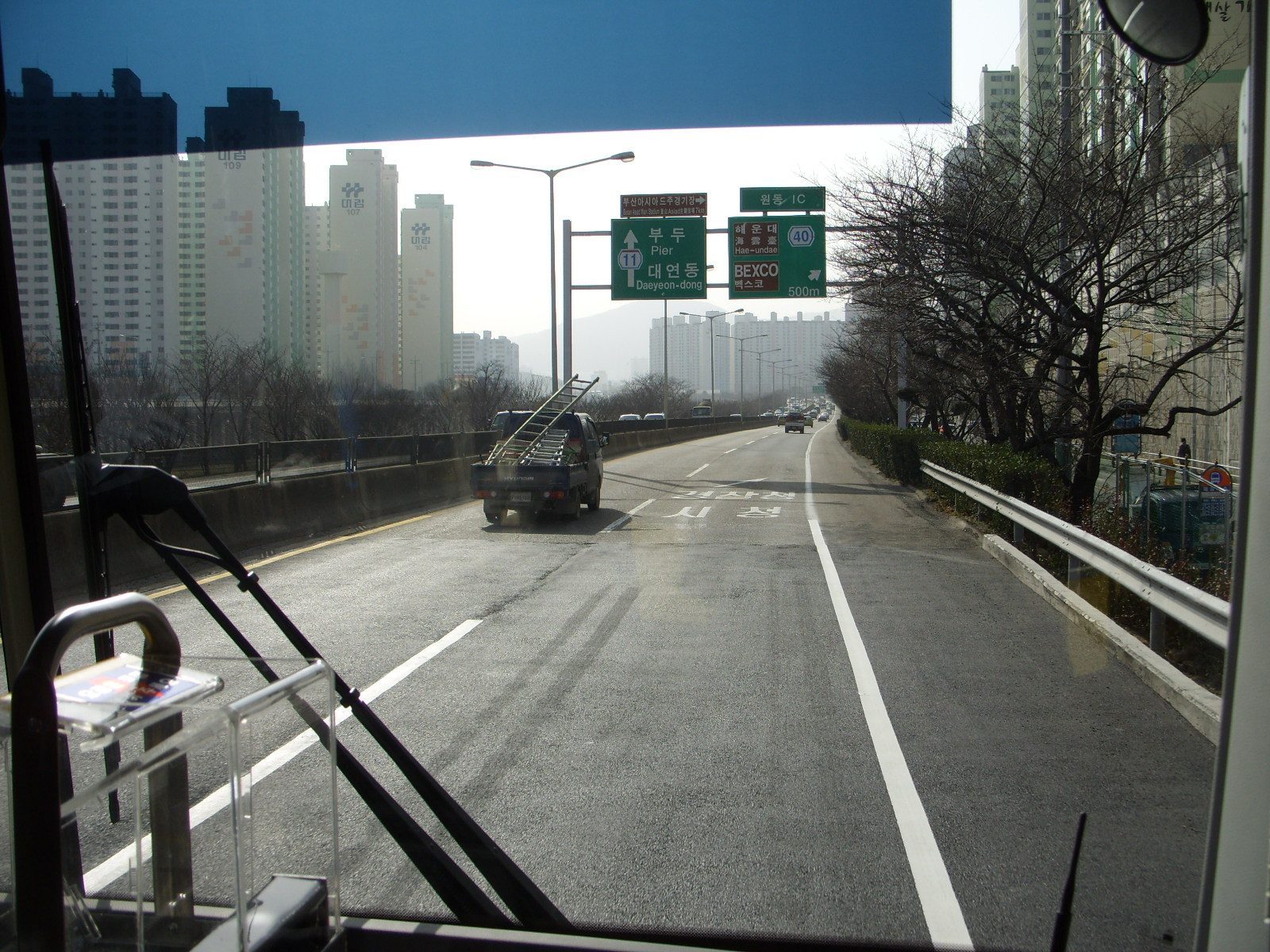
Wondong IC (to Downtown) in Beonyeong-no Road, Busan, South Korea.

- 4th Pier IC
- Dongcheon Junction
- Munhyeon IC
- Daeyeon IC
- Mangmi IC
- Wondong IC
- Geumsa IC
- Seokdae Elevated Road IC
- Hoedong JC (Gateway of Jeonggwan Indus Zn.)
- Guseo IC (Gyeongbu Expressway, National Route 7 and Asian Highway Network AH 6)

== Tunnels ==
On Beonyeong-no Road, there are 5 tunnels.

- Munhyeon Tunnel
- Daeyeong Tunnel
- Gwangan Tunnel
- Suyeong Tunnel
- Oryun Tunnel

== Information ==
- You can't run this road by Motorcycle (An Emergency vehicle is excluded. A thing as an emergency vehicle says a Police motorcycle), Moped, Agricultural machinery (Rotary tiller, Tractor), Bicycle, and on foot because this road is a motorway.

== Transport ==
Bus routes which use the crossing:

- Busan Urban Bus 1007: from Wondong IC to Hoedong JC.
- Intercity bus : Haeundae ~ Busan (Nopo-dong) ~ Osan·Suwon·Ansan·Bucheon - from Wondong IC to Guseo IC (by Gyeongnam Express: 경남고속).

== See also ==
- AH1
- AH6
- Gyeongbu Expressway
