= Sintanjin =

Coordinates: 36°26′21″N 127°27′55″E

Shintanjin is a city located north of Daejeon, South Korea. This city is famous for the biggest cigarette factory in Korea, especially the ESSE brand, the best seller in the superslim cigarette category overseas. Although it's a suburb of Daejeon, there is a train station connecting other cities and Seoul. In April, there is an annual cherry blossom festival near the famous cigarette factory. There are many motels and pubs around the train station. There is a big famous dam near this town.
