= Namhae Expressway Branch =

Namhae Expressway has 3 branches.

- Namhae Expressway Branch 1 (Expressway 102): Haman County, South Gyeongsang ~ Uichang-gu, Changwon, South Gyeongsang
- Namhae Expressway Branch 2 (Expressway 104): Gimhae, South Gyeongsang ~ Sasang District, Busan
- Namhae Expressway Branch 3 (planned; Expressway 105): Jinhae-gu, Changwon, South Gyeongsang ~ Gimhae, South Gyeongsang
- Namhae Expressway Branch 3 (abolished): Hadong County, South Gyeongsang ~ Gwangyang, South Jeolla
