= Road transport in South Korea =

Highway system of South Korea
- Highway markers for the Namhae Expressway, the National Route 3, Seoul Inner Loop, and Local Route 13

System information
- Maintained by Ministry of Land, Infrastructure and Transport (South Korea) and Korea Expressway Corporation

Highway names

System links
- Highway systems of South Korea; Expressways; National; Local

Road transport is an essential element of the South Korean transport network, and vital part of the South Korean economy. The total length of the country's road and highway networks is 110,714 km. As of 2023, a total of about 25.85 million vehicles were registered.

South Korea has taken various measures to improve road safety. Strict penalties for drunk driving, stricter speed limits, and seat belt mandates are some of them.

== Highway systems ==
South Korea has seven highway systems:

- National expressways
- General national highways
- Special Metropolitan City roads and Metropolitan City roads
- Local highways
- Si roads
- Gun roads
- Gu roads

== Road signs ==
Korea uses standard international road signs and traffic signals.

== See also ==
- Hi-pass, electronic toll collection system in South Korea
- Rail transport in South Korea
