= Expressway 12 (South Korea) =

Expressway 12 may refer to the following roads in South Korea:

- Muan–Gwangju Expressway : Muan County, South Jeolla ~ Gwangsan District, Gwangju
- Gwangju–Daegu Expressway : Buk District, Gwangju ~ Dalseong County, Daegu
