= Sincheon-daero =

Sincheon-daero (Korean: 신천대로) is road name in South Korea.

- Sincheon-daero (Daegu)
- Sincheon-daero (Busan)
