= Seo-myeon =

Seo-myeon in South Korea may refers to

- Seomyeon, Busan in Busan
- Seo-myeon, Yangyang County in Gangwon-do
- Seo-myeon, Seocheon in Chungcheongnam-do
- Seo-myeon, Chuncheon County in Gangwon-do
- Seo-myeon, Suncheon in Jeollanam-do
- Seo-myeon, Ulleung County in Gyeongsangbuk-do
- Seo-myeon, Uljin County in Gyeongsangbuk-do
- Seo-myeon, Namhae County in Gyeongsangnam-do
- Seo-myeon, Yeongi County in Chungcheongnam-do
- Seo-myeon, Gyeongju in Gyeongsangbuk-do
- Seo-myeon, Yeongwol County in Gangwon-do
- Seo-myeon, Hongcheon County in Gangwon-do
- Seo-myeon, Cheorwon County in Gangwon-do
