= Local Route 37 (South Korea) =

Road in South Korea

State-Funded Local Highway 37
- 국가지원지방도 제37호선
- Namwon-Geochang Line 남원 ~ 거창선

Route information
- Length: 75.4 km (46.9 mi)
- Existed: 25 August 2001–present

Major junctions
- South end: Inwol-myeon, Namwon, South Jeolla Province
- North end: Mari-myeon, Geochang County, South Gyeongsang Province

Location
- Country: South Korea

Highway system
- Highway systems of South Korea; Expressways; National; Local

Local Route 37 Namwon–Geochang Line (Korean: 국가지원지방도 제37호선 남원 ~ 거창선) is a local route of South Korea that connecting Namwon, South Jeolla Province to Geochang County, South Gyeongsang Province.

== History ==
This route was established on 25 August 2001.

== Stopovers ==
South Jeolla Province

- Namwon

South Gyeongsang Province

- Hamyang County - Geochang County

== Major intersections ==
- (■): Motorway

IS: Intersection, IC: Interchange

=== South Jeolla Province ===
| Name | Hangul name | Connection | Location | | Note |
|---|---|---|---|---|---|
| Inwol IS | 인월 교차로 | National Route 24; Prefectural Route 60 (Hwangsan-ro) | Namwon City | Inwol-myeon | Terminus |
| No name | (이름 없음) | Inwoljangteo-ro | Namwon City | Inwol-myeon | Gwangju-Daegu Expressway; Indirect connected with Jirisan IC |
| Chwiam Bridge Jisan Elementary School (Closed) | 취암교 지산초등학교(폐교) | | Namwon City | Inwol-myeon | |
| Adong Bridge | 아동교 | | Namwon City | Inwol-myeon | |
| Adong Bridge | | | Namwon City | Ayeong-myeon | |
| Ayeong IS | 아영사거리 | Prefectural Route 751 (Heungbu-ro); Abaek-ro | Namwon City | Ayeong-myeon | |
| Uiji Bridge | 의지교 | | Namwon City | Ayeong-myeon | |
| Yuldong IS | 율동삼거리 | Yuldong 1-gil | Namwon City | Ayeong-myeon | Continuation into South Gyeongsang Province |

=== South Gyeongsang Province ===
| Name | Hangul name | Connection | Location | | Note |
|---|---|---|---|---|---|
| Ocheon 2 Overpass Ocheon Bridge | 오천2육교 오천교 | | Hamyang County | Baekjeon-myeon | South Jeolla Province - South Gyeongsang Province border line |
| Daepyeong IS | 대평삼거리 | Prefectural Route 1001 (Hamyangnamseo-ro) | Hamyang County | Baekjeon-myeon | Prefectural Route 1001 overlap |
| No name | (이름 없음) | Gusandaean-ro | Hamyang County | Baekjeon-myeon | Prefectural Route 1001 overlap |
| Unsan Bridge | 운산교 | Prefectural Route 742 (Unsan-gil) | Hamyang County | Baekjeon-myeon | Prefectural Route 1001 overlap |
| Baekun Elementary School (Closed) Baekun Bridge | 백운초등학교(폐교) 백운교 | | Hamyang County | Baekjeon-myeon | Prefectural Route 1001 overlap |
| No name | (이름 없음) | Baegun-ro | Hamyang County | Baekjeon-myeon | Prefectural Route 1001 overlap |
| Wontongjae | 원통재 (빼빼재) | | Hamyang County | Baekjeon-myeon | Prefectural Route 1001 overlap |
| Wontongjae | | | Hamyang County | Seoha-myeon | Prefectural Route 1001 overlap |
| Seoha Elementary School Unjeong Branch (Closed) Ungok Bridge Songgye Bridge Seoha-myeon Office | 서하초등학교 운정분교(폐교) 운곡교 송계교 서하면사무소 | | Hamyang County | Seoha-myeon | Prefectural Route 1001 overlap |
| Songgye IS | 송계삼거리 | National Route 26 (Yuksimnyeong-ro); Songgye-gil | Hamyang County | Seoha-myeon | National Route 26 overlap Prefectural Route 1001 overlap |
| (Songgye Connecting Road) | (송계통로) | Seosang-ro | Hamyang County | Seosang-myeon | National Route 26 overlap Prefectural Route 1001 overlap Connected with Seosang IC |
| Docheon Bridge | 도천교 | | Hamyang County | Seosang-myeon | National Route 26 overlap Prefectural Route 1001 overlap |
| Osan 2 Bridge | 오산2교 | Daenam-ro | Hamyang County | Seosang-myeon | National Route 26 overlap Prefectural Route 1001 overlap Connected with Seosang IC |
| Osan 1 Bridge Jungnam Bridge | 오산1교 중남교 | | Hamyang County | Seosang-myeon | National Route 26 overlap Prefectural Route 1001 overlap |
| Jungnam IS | 중남사거리 | National Route 26 (Yuksimnyeong-ro); Seosang-ro | Hamyang County | Seosang-myeon | National Route 26 overlap Prefectural Route 1001 overlap |
| Dongdae 1 Bridge Dongdae 2 Bridge Dongdae 3 Bridge Deoknam Elementary School (Closed) Yeonggak Bridge Yeonggaksa | 동대1교 동대2교 동대3교 덕남초등학교(폐교) 영각교 영각사 | | Hamyang County | Seosang-myeon | Prefectural Route 1001 overlap |
| Namryeong | 남령 | | Hamyang County | Seosang-myeon | Prefectural Route 1001 overlap |
| Namryeong | | | Geochang County | Buksang-myeon | Prefectural Route 1001 overlap |
| Wolseong 2 Bridge Wolseong 1 Bridge Sansu Bridge Nongsan Bridge Buksang Bridge | 월성2교 월성1교 산수교 농산교 북상교 | | Geochang County | Buksang-myeon | Prefectural Route 1001 overlap |
| Buksang-myeon Office | 북상면사무소 | Prefectural Route 1001 (Songgye-ro) | Geochang County | Buksang-myeon | Prefectural Route 1001 overlap |
| Suseungdae Hwangsan Bridge | 수승대 황산교 | | Geochang County | Wicheon-myeon | |
| (Roundabout) | (회전 교차로) | Modong-gil; Wonhak-gil | Geochang County | Wicheon-myeon | |
| Wicheon 2 Bridge | 위천2교 | | Geochang County | Wicheon-myeon | |
| No name | (이름 없음) | Songgye-ro; Wonhak-gil | Geochang County | Wicheon-myeon | |
| Geochang Namsan Argo-Industrial Complex | 거창남산농공단지 | Songgye-ro | Geochang County | Wicheon-myeon | |
| Jangpung IS | 장풍삼거리 | National Route 37 (Ppaejae-ro) | Geochang County | Mari-myeon | Terminus |

== See also ==
- Roads and expressways in South Korea
- Transportation in South Korea
