= Namhae Expressway Branch 1 =

Expressway in South Korea

Expressway No.102
- Namhae Expressway 1st Branch

Route information
- Length: 17.88 km (11.11 mi)

Major junctions
- West end: Sanin JC in Haman, Gyeongsangnam-do; Namhae Expressway
- 4
- East end: Changwon JC in Changwon, Gyeongsangnam-do; Namhae Expressway

Location
- Country: South Korea

Highway system
- Highway systems of South Korea; Expressways; National; Local

- Namhae Expressway Branch 1
- Hangul: 남해고속도로제1지선
- Hanja: 南海高速道路第一支線
- RR: Namhae gosok doro je1 jiseon
- MR: Namhae kosok toro che1 chisŏn

The Namhae Expressway Branch 1, or the Namhae Expressway 1st Branch (Korean: 남해고속도로제1지선) is an expressway in South Korea, connecting Haman to Changwon. It is Branch Line of Namhae Expressway.

== History ==
- 14 November 1973: Open to Traffic.(This segment is one of the Namhae Expressway)
- 25 August 2001: Masan Oegwak Expressway(마산외곽고속도로) opens to traffic.(Sanin~Changwon)
- 17 November 2008: This segment is endowed name with Namhae 1st Branch Expressway, And Masan Oegwak Expressway is changed name with Namhae Expressway.

== Constructions ==
=== Lanes ===
- 4 lanes

=== Length ===
- 17.88 km

=== Limited Speed ===
- 100 km/h

== List of facilities ==
- IC: Interchange, JC: Junction, SA: Service Area, TG:Tollgate

No.	Name	Korean name	Hanja name	Connections	Notes	Location
1	Sanin JC	산인분기점	山仁分岐點	Namhae Expressway (Expressway route 10)	Expressway Begin	Haman, Gyeongsangnam-do
TG	Sanin TG	산인요금소	山仁料金所			
2	Naeseo JC	내서분기점	內西分岐點	Jungbu Naeryuk Expressway (Expressway route 45); National Route 5, Local Route 30		Changwon, Gyeongsangnam-do
3	W.Masan IC	서마산나들목	西馬山나들목	National Route 5		
4	E.Masan IC	동마산나들목	東馬山나들목	National Route 14, National Route 79		
TG	Masan TG	마산요금소	馬山料金所			
5	Changwon JC	창원분기점	昌原分岐點	Namhae Expressway (Expressway route 10)		
	Changwon End	창원 종점	昌原 終點	Namhae Expressway (Expressway route 10)	Expressway End	

== See also ==
- Namhae Expressway
- Namhae Expressway Branch 2
