= Suncheon Junction =

Road junction in South Korea

- 순천 분기점, 順天分岐點

Location
- Seo-myeon, Suncheon, South Jeolla, South Korea
- Coordinates: 34°59′27.96″N 127°32′20.01″E
- Roads at junction: Namhae Expressway; Suncheon–Wanju Expressway

Construction
- Type: Deleted turbine interchange
- Constructed: by Korea Expressway Corporation
- Opened: January 31, 2011

Suncheon Junction (Korean: 순천 분기점; Hanja: 順天分岐點), shortly Suncheon JC, is a junction located in Seo-myeon, Suncheon, South Jeolla, South Korea. Namhae Expressway (No. 10) and Suncheon–Wanju Expressway (No. 27) meet here. The type of junction is deleted turbine.

== Roads ==
Namhae Expressway
toward Yeongam	←	12; Suncheon Junction	→	toward Busan
11; Suncheon IC; 2.19 km	←	12; Suncheon Junction	→	13; Gwangyang IC; 6.58 km
Suncheon–Wanju Expressway
toward Suncheon	←	2 Suncheon Junction	→	toward Wanju
1 E. Suncheon IC; 5.12 km	←	2 Suncheon Junction	→	3 Hwangjeon IC; 19.38 km

== History ==
31 January 2011 : It opened with W. Namwon ~ Suncheon segment of Suncheon–Wanju Expressway

== Location ==
- Jeollanam-do
  - Suncheon-si
    - Seo-myeon
      - Gusang-ri
      - Apgok-ri
