= Sincheon-daero (Daegu) =

Road in South Korea

Daegu Metropolitan City Route11
- Sincheon-daero 신천대로

Route information
- Length: 20.4 km (12.7 mi)
- Existed: 1987–present

Major junctions
- West end: Dalseo, Daegu (South Daegu Interchange); Jungbu Naeryuk Expressway Branch
- National Route 30; Gyeongbu Expressway
- East end: Dalseong County, Daegu(Gachang-myeon)

Location
- Country: South Korea

Highway system
- Highway systems of South Korea; Expressways; National; Local

- Sincheon-daero

Korean name
- Hangul: 신천대로
- Hanja: 新川大路
- Literal meaning: Sincheon Boulevard
- Revised Romanization: Sincheon-daero
- McCune–Reischauer: Sinch'ŏn-daero

The Sincheon-daero (Korean: 신천대로; Hanja: 新川大路) is an 8-lane highway located in Daegu, Republic of Korea. This route links the Jungbu Naeryuk Expressway Branch and downtown of Daegu, with a total length of 20.4 km (12.7 mi). South Daegu IC ~ West Daegu IC section runs parallel with Jungbu Naeryuk Expressway and is called the City Expressway (도시고속도로).

== History ==
- 29 September 1987 : Samdeok-dong ~ Daebong-dong (1.0 km), Paldalgyo ~ Chimsangyo (4.0 km) section opens to traffic.
- March 1994 : Paldalgyo ~ Sangdonggyo section opens to traffic.
- July 1996 : Guma Expressway Branch (구마고속도로 지선 / West Daegu IC ~ Paldalgyo Ramp) went out of use for expressway and was incorporated into Sincheon-daero.
- June 2010 : South Daegu IC ~ West Daegu IC section opens to traffic.
- 20 September 2011 : Ihyeon Ramp opens to traffic.
- 27 December 2013 : Sicheon Jwaan-doro section (6.69 km) opens to traffic.
