= Jungbu Naeryuk Expressway Branch =

Road in South Korea

Expressway No.451
- Jungbu Naeryuk Expressway Branch 중부내륙고속도로지선

Route information
- Length: 30.0 km (18.6 mi)
- Existed: 1977–present

Major junctions
- South end: Hyeonpung JC in Dalseong County, Daegu
- Gwangju-Daegu Expressway
- North end: Geumho JC in Buk-gu, Daegu

Location
- Country: South Korea

Highway system
- Highway systems of South Korea; Expressways; National; Local

- Jungbu Naeryuk Expressway Branch
- Hangul: 중부내륙고속도로지선
- Hanja: 中部內陸高速道路支線
- RR: Jungbu naeryuk gosok doro jiseon
- MR: Chungbu naeryuk kosok toro chisŏn

The Jungbu Naeryuk Expressway Branch (Korean: 중부내륙고속도로지선) is an expressway in South Korea, connecting Dalseong County to Buk District, Daegu (30 km). It is numbered 451 and was formerly named the Guma Expressway (구마고속도로).

Originally, this route was called Daegu–Masan section (86.4 km). Due to a reform of Korean expressway route numbers in August 2001, the Masan–Hyeonpung JCT section was incorporated into the Jungbu Naeryuk Expressway.

In 2008, the Guma Expressway changed its name to Jungbu Naeryuk Expressway Branch.

== Information ==
=== Lanes ===
- Hyeonpung–Okpo: 4 Lanes
- South Daegu–West Daegu: 6 Lanes
- Hwawon Okpo–South Daegu, West Daegu–Geumho: 8 Lanes
- Okpo–Hwawon Okpo: 10 Lanes

=== Lengths ===
- 30.0 km

=== Speed limit ===
- 100 km/h

== List of facilities ==
- IC: Interchange, JC: Junction, SA: Service Area, TG:Tollgate

No.	Name	Korean name	Hanja name	Connections	Notes	Location
Connected directly with Jungbu Naeryuk Expressway
1	Hyeonpung JC	현풍분기점	玄風分岐點	Jungbu Naeryuk Expressway		Dalseong County, Daegu
SA 1-1	Hyeonpung SA; N. Hyeonpung	현풍휴게소 북현풍	玄風休憩所 北玄風	National Route 5 Local Route 67	Two-way Hi-pass exclusive interchange	Dalseong County, Daegu
2	Dalseong IC	달성나들목	達城나들목	Nongong-ro		Dalseong County, Daegu
3	Okpo JC	옥포분기점	玉浦分岐點	Gwangju-Daegu Expressway	Geumho-bound Only	Dalseong County, Daegu
4	Hwawon·Okpo IC	화원·옥포나들목	花園玉浦나들목	National Route 5 National Route 26		Dalseong County, Daegu
~~5~~	~~Hwawon Amusement Park IC~~			~~Samunjin-ro~~	Closed 30 June 2007	Dalseong County, Daegu
5	Yucheon IC	유천	有泉	Daegu Metropolitan City Road 10 (Dalseo-daero); Seongcheon-ro	Hi-pass exclusive interchange	Dalseong County, Daegu
6	S. Daegu IC	남대구나들목	南大邱나들목	Sincheon-daero	Hyeonpung-bound Only	Dalseo-gu, Daegu
~~7~~	~~Seongseo IC~~	~~성서나들목~~	~~城西나들목~~	~~National Route 30~~	Abolished as a highway interchange on 30 June 2010 and downgraded to an interchange on Sincheon-daero	Dalseo-gu, Daegu
8	W. Daegu IC	서대구나들목	西大邱나들목	Sincheon-daero	Geumho-bound Only	Seo-gu, Daegu
9	Geumho JC	금호분기점	琴湖分岐點	Gyeongbu Expressway ( AH 1); Jungang Expressway		Buk-gu, Daegu
Connected directly with Jungang Expressway

== See also ==
- Sincheon-daero, Daegu
- Roads and expressways in South Korea
- Transportation in South Korea
