= Namhae Expressway Branch 2 =

Expressway in South Korea

Expressway No.104
- Namhae Expressway 2nd Branch

Route information
- Length: 20.6 km (12.8 mi)
- Existed: 1981–present

Major junctions
- West end: Naengjeong JC in Gimhae, Gyeongsangnam-do; Namhae Expressway
- 5
- East end: Sasang IC in Sasang-gu, Busan

Location
- Country: South Korea

Highway system
- Highway systems of South Korea; Expressways; National; Local

- Namhae Expressway Branch 2
- Hangul: 남해고속도로제2지선
- Hanja: 南海高速道路第二支線
- RR: Namhae gosok doro je2 jiseon
- MR: Namhae kosok toro che2 chisŏn

The Namhae Expressway Branch 2, or the Namhae Expressway 2nd Branch (Korean: 남해고속도로제2지선) is an expressway in South Korea, connecting Gimhae to Busan. It is Branch Line of Namhae Expressway. Former name is Buma Expressway (부마고속도로).

== History ==
- 22 May 1978: Construction Begin
- 4 September 1981: Opens to traffic.(Name: Buma Expressway)
- 29 April 1992: Name is changed to Namhae 2nd Branch Expressway

== Constructions ==
=== Lanes ===
- 4 lanes

=== Length ===
- 20.6 km

=== Limited Speed ===
- 90 km/h

== List of facilities ==
- IC: Interchange, JC: Junction, SA: Service Area, TG:Tollgate

No.	Name	Korean name	Hanja name	Connections	Notes	Location
1	Naengjeong JC	냉정분기점	冷井分岐點	Namhae Expressway ( Namhae Expressway Branch 3)	Indirect connection to Namhae Expressway Branch 3 when exiting towards Suncheon	Gimhae, Gyeongsangnam-do
SA	Jangyu SA	장유휴게소	長有休憩所		Busan-bound only	Gimhae, Gyeongsangnam-do
2	Jangyu IC	장유나들목	長有나들목	National Route 58; Geumgwan-daero, Jangyu-ro		Gimhae, Gyeongsangnam-do
2-1	Namjangyu IC	남장유 나들목	南長由 交叉路	Yulha 4-ro	Hi-pass exclusive interchange; entrance towards Gimhae and exit towards Busan only	Gimhae, Gyeongsangnam-do
TG	W. Busan TG	서부산요금소	西釜山料金所		Main tollgate	Gangseo-gu, Busan
3	Garak IC	가락나들목	駕洛나들목	Local Route 58 (Garak-daero); Local Route 69 (Garak-daero); Garak-daero		Gangseo-gu, Busan
SA	W. Busan SA	서부산휴게소	西 부산休息所		Gimhae-bound only Former W. Busan TG	Gangseo-gu, Busan
4	W. Busan IC	서부산나들목	西釜山나들목	Busan city expressway route 31 (Airport-ro)		Gangseo-gu, Busan
5	Sasang IC	사상나들목	沙上나들목	Dongseo Goga-ro; Busan city expressway route 30 (Gaya-daero); Busan city expressway route 41 (Nakdong-daero)	Route terminus	Sasang-gu, Busan
Directly connected to Dongseo Goga-ro
