= Jungang Expressway Branch =

Road in South Korea

Expressway No.551
- Jungang Expressway Branch 중앙고속도로지선

Route information
- Length: 18.2 km (11.3 mi)
- Existed: 1996–present

Major junctions
- South end: Gimhae, Gyeongnam; Namhae Expressway
- Jungang Expressway
- North end: Yangsan, Gyeongnam; Gyeongbu Expressway( AH 1)

Location
- Country: South Korea

Highway system
- Highway systems of South Korea; Expressways; National; Local

- Jungang Expressway Branch
- Hangul: 중앙고속도로지선
- Hanja: 中央高速道路支線
- RR: Jungang gosok doro jiseon
- MR: Chungang kosok toro chisŏn

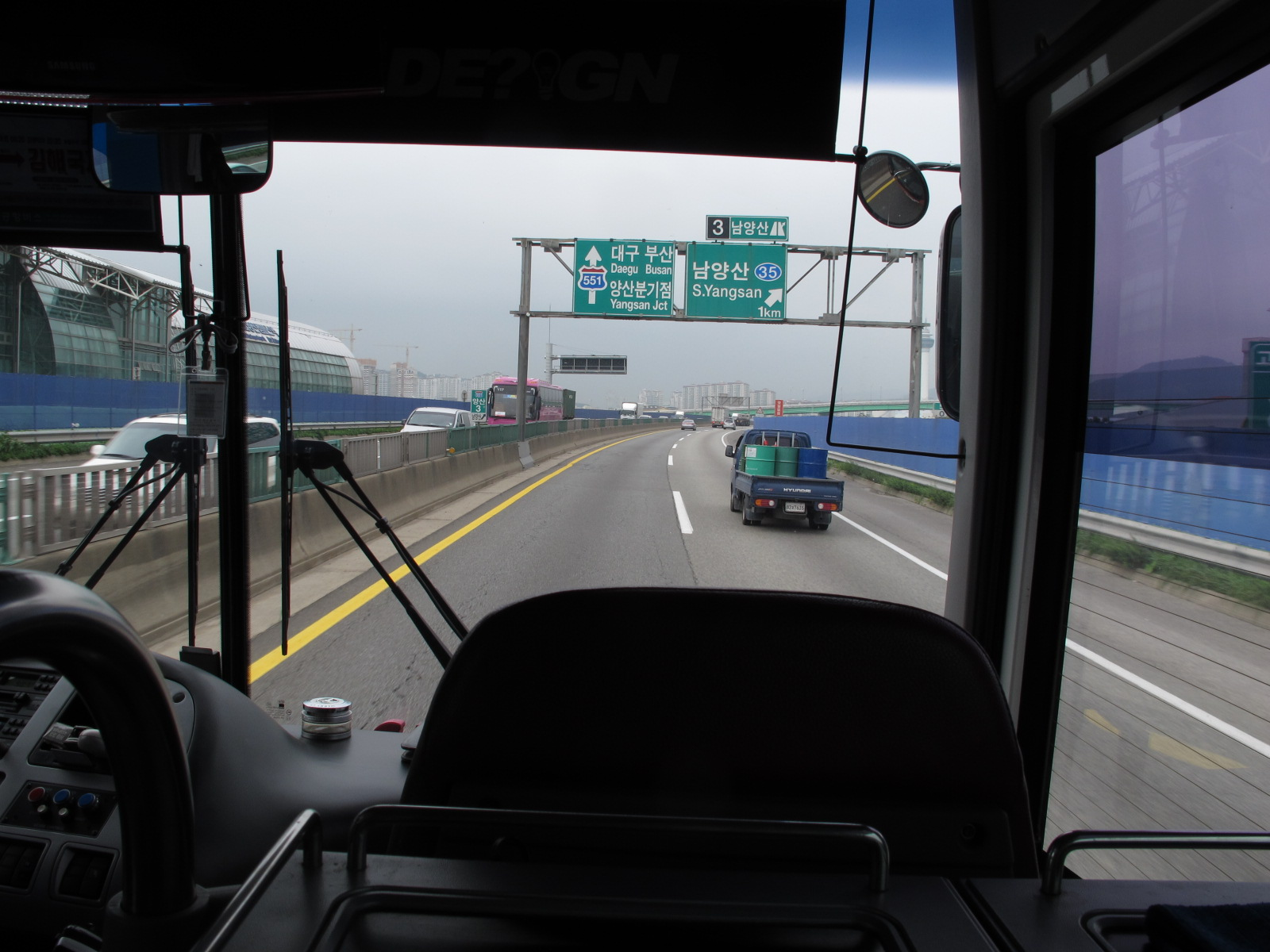
South Yangsan IC, 2012

The Jungang Expressway Branch (Korean: 중앙고속도로지선) is an expressway in South Korea. It connects Gimhae to Yangsan of South Gyeongsang Province. The expressway's route number is 551.

It link Namhae Expressway(Gimhae) and Gyeongbu Expressway(Yangsan). and doesn't have any Service Area.

== Information ==
=== Lanes ===
- Gimhae JCT ~ Daedong JCT : 4 Lanes
- Daedong JCT ~ Yangsan JCT : 6 Lanes

== List of facilities ==
- IC: Interchange, JC: Junction, SA: Service Area, TG:Tollgate

== See also ==
- Jungang Expressway
- Expressways in South Korea
- Transport in South Korea
