= Seo-myeon, Suncheon =

Seo-myeon
- Township (myeon)
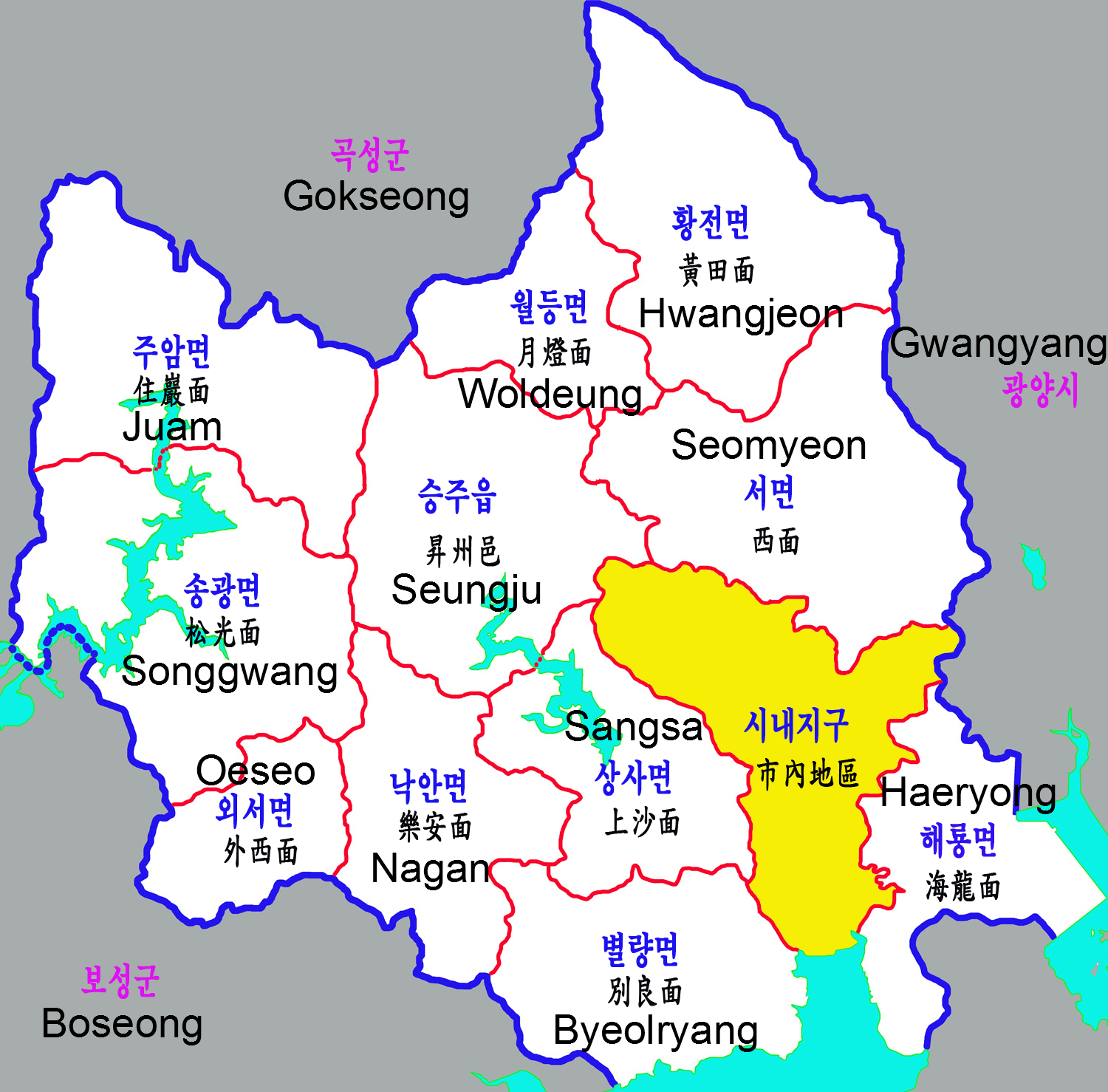
- Seo-myeon(서면) in the map of Suncheon
- Coordinates: 35.0°N 127.5°E
- Country: South Korea
- Province (do): South Jeolla
- City (si): Suncheon
- Administrative divisions: 14 jurisdiction: 59 administrative district; 87 ban

Area
  - Total: 103.54 km^{2} (39.98 sq mi)

Population
  - Total: 12,346
  - Density: 119.24/km^{2} (308.83/sq mi)
- Time zone: UTC+9 (Korea Standard Time)

Korean name
- Hangul: 서면
- Hanja: 西面
- RR: Seo-myeon
- MR: Sŏ-myŏn

Seo-myeon (Korean: 서면; lit. 'West Township'), also called Seo Township, is a myeon (township) in Suncheon, a city in the South Jeolla Province, South Korea. Name of the township means West Township, but it is located in the eastern part, not western part, of the city with a total area of 103.54 square kilometres (39.98 sq mi). The population was recorded to be 12346 people, 6141 males and 6205 females, and the number of houses totaled 4979. The township office is located in 94, Imchondong-gil in Dongsan-ri. There are Bonggang-myeon, Gwangyang in the east of the township, Seungju-eup in the west; Samsan-dong and Wangjo-dong in the south; Woldeung-myeon in the north-west; and Hwangjeon-myeon in the north.

== History ==
It was in Seungpyeong-gun (Korean: 승평군) in the 16th year of Gyeongdeok of Silla (757 CE). It became Bukseo-myeon, Seungju-gun (Korean: 승주군 북서면) in the 14th year of Seongjong of Goryeo (995 CE). It became Seo-myeon, Suncheon-gun (Korean: 순천군 서면) in the 32nd year of Gojong of Joseon (1895 CE). It became Seo-myeon, Seungju-gun (Korean: 승주군 서면) on 15 August 1945. It became Seo-myeon, Suncheon-si (Korean: 순천시 서면) on 1 January 1995.

== Ri ==
Seo-myeon has fourteen jurisdictions and fifty-nine administrative districts.

=== Guman-ri ===
Guman-ri (Korean: 구만리) has five administrative districts: Guman-ri(구만리), Dundae-ri(둔대리), Suchon-ri(수촌리), Gaeun-ri(개운리), and Hoeryong-ri(회룡리).

=== Gusang-ri ===
Gusang-ri (Korean: 구상리) has two administrative districts: Gusang-ri(구상리), and Maryun-ri(마륜리). It has Suncheon Junction on Namhae Expressway and Suncheon–Wanju Expressway.

=== Daegu-ri ===
Daegu-ri (Korean: 대구리) has two administrative districts: Daegu 1-ri(대구1리), and Daegu 2-ri(대구2리).

=== Dongsan-ri ===
Dongsan-ri (Korean: 동산리) has five administrative districts: Dongsan-ri(동산리), Wolsan-ri(월산리), Imchon-ri(임촌리), Munhwa-ri(문화리), and Bukcha-ri(북차리). It has township office on 94, Imchondong-gil; Suncheon Electronic High School on 86, Suncheon-ro; and West Suncheon Interchange on Namhae Expressway and Honam Expressway.

=== Biwol-ri ===
Biwol-ri (Korean: 비월리) has three administrative districts: Biwol-ri(비월리), Deokjin-ri(덕진리), and Singi-ri(신기리).

=== Seonpyeong-ri ===
Seonpyeong-ri (Korean: 선평리) has eleven administrative districts: Seonpyeong-ri(선평리), Geonbo-ri(건보리), Sinheung-ri(신흥리), Gangcheong 1-ri(강청1리), Gangcheong 2-ri(강청2리), Gangcheong 3-ri(강청3리), Baedeul 1-ri(배들1리), Baedeul 2-ri(배들2리), Baedeul 3-ri(배들3리), Jugong 1-ri(주공1리), and Jugong 2-ri(주공2리).

=== Apgok-ri ===
Apgok-ri (Korean: 압곡리) has seven administrative districts: Apgok-ri(압곡리), Dangbon 1-ri(당본1리), Dangbon 2-ri(당본2리), Hwajeong-ri(화정리), Geoncheon-ri(건천리), Yongrim-ri(용림리), and Yul-ri(율리). It has Suncheon Interchange on Namhae Expressway.

=== Unpyeong-ri ===
Unpyeong-ri (Korean: 운평리) has six administrative districts: Unpyeong-ri(운평리), Dangcheon-ri(당천리), Wolgok-ri(월곡리), Yongdang-ri(용당리), Jukdong-ri(죽동리), and Jukcheong-ri(죽청리).

=== Jukpyeong-ri ===
Jukpyeong-ri (Korean: 죽평리) has two administrative districts: Jukpyeong-ri(죽평리), and Ipseok-ri(입석리).

=== Jibon-ri ===
Jibon-ri (Korean: 지본리) has three administrative districts: Jibon-ri(지본리), Guryong-ri(구룡리), and Geumpyeong-ri(금평리).

=== Cheongso-ri ===
Cheongso-ri (Korean: 청소리) has three administrative districts: Cheongso-ri(청소리), Simwon-ri(심원리), and Songnae-ri(송내리).

=== Pangyo-ri ===
Pangyo-ri (Korean: 판교리) has four administrative districts: Pangyo-ri(판교리), Noeun-ri(노은리), Chudong-ri(추동리), and Gidong-ri(기동리).

=== Hakgu-ri ===
Hakgu-ri (Korean: 학구리) has three administrative districts: Hakgu-ri(학구리), Jangcheok-ri(장척리), and Sinchon-ri(신촌리).

=== Heungdae-ri ===
Heungdae-ri (Korean: 흥대리) has three administrative districts: Heungdae-ri(흥대리), Yeondong-ri(연동리), and Hakdong-ri(학동리).
