= Gyeongin Expressway =

Oldest expressway in South Korea

Expressway No.120
- Gyeongin Expressway

Route information
- Length: 24 km (15 mi)
- Existed: 1968–present

Major junctions
- east end: Sinwol Interchange in Yangcheon-gu, Seoul
- west end: Nam-gu, Incheon

Location
- Country: South Korea

Highway system
- Highway systems of South Korea; Expressways; National; Local

- Gyeongin Expressway
- Hangul: 경인고속도로
- Hanja: 京仁高速道路
- RR: Gyeongin gosok doro
- MR: Kyŏngin kosok toro

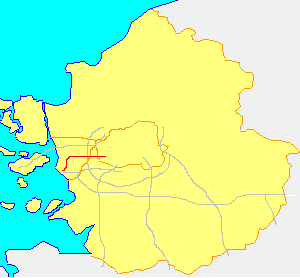
Road sections are painted red

The Gyeongin Expressway (Korean: 경인고속도로), officially Expressway No. 120, is an expressway in South Korea connecting the Yangcheon District of Seoul to the Nam District of Incheon. It is the oldest expressway in South Korea, predating Gyeongbu Expressway by 3 years. Upon its opening, it reduced the travel time between Incheon and Seoul from one hour to 18 minutes, effectively integrating the two cities into a single living zone.

Construction began March 24, 1967. The initial segment between Gajwa in the Seo District of Incheon and Yangpyeong-dong in the Yeongdeungpo District of Seoul opened on December 21, 1968. This was followed by the opening of the section from Gajwa to Incheon Port. In 1985, the easternmost segment between Yangpyeong and the Shinwol Interchange was transferred to Seoul, making Shinwol in the Yancheong District the new terminus.

It was assigned route number 2 in 1983. In 2001, South Korea re-rationalized its expressway numbering system, and it was redesignated route 120.

== History ==
Construction of the highway began on 24 March 1967 and was completed on 21 December 1968, becoming South Korea's first expressway. Originally a four-lane highway, it was expanded to six to eight lanes in various sections to accommodate surging traffic volume.

The region's infrastructure was further developed with the opening of the Second Gyeongin Expressway in December 1996, which connects Incheon to Seongnam, and the Third Gyeongin Expressway in May 2010, which connects Incheon to Siheung.

== Gallery ==
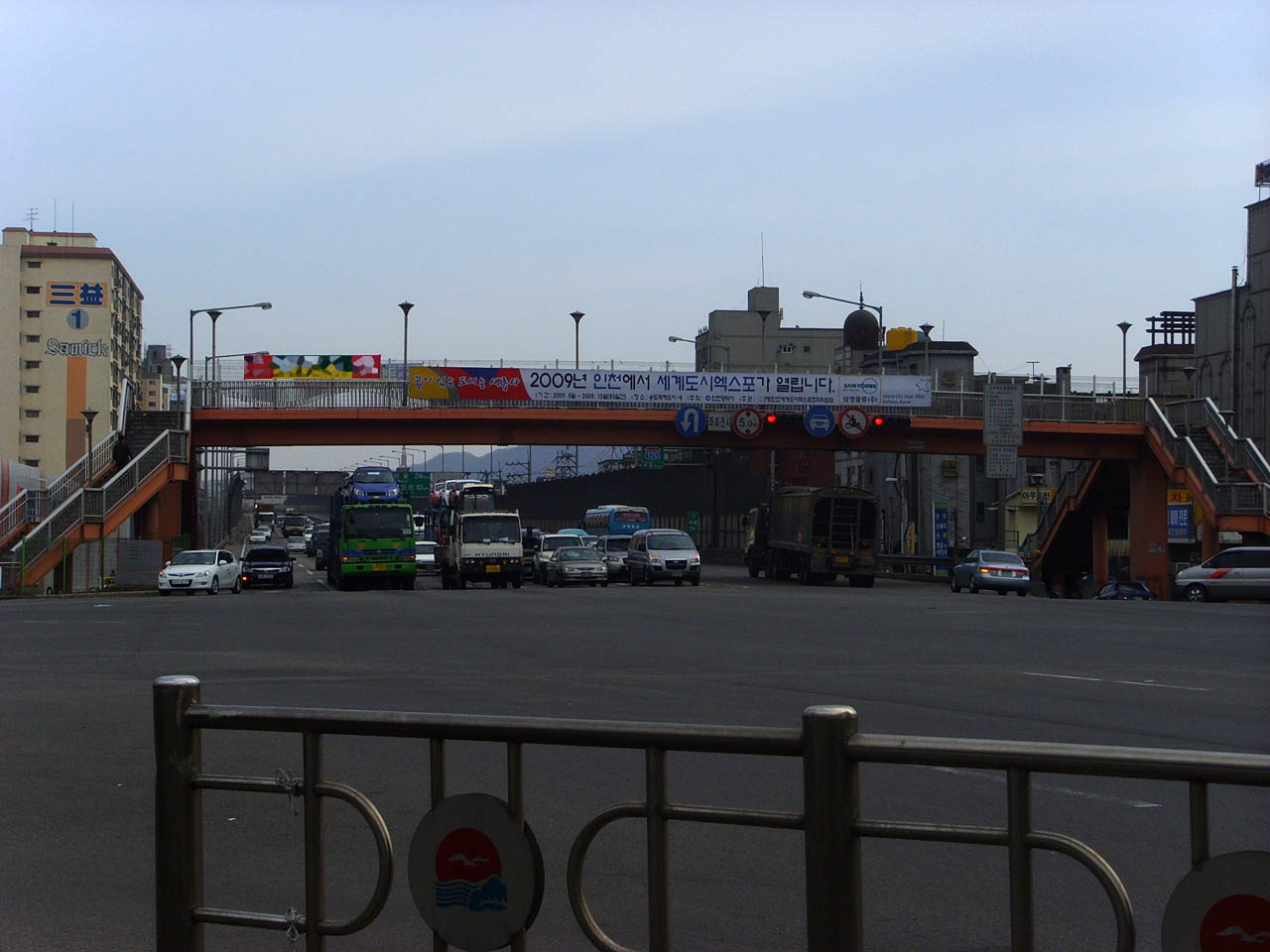
Expressway Start

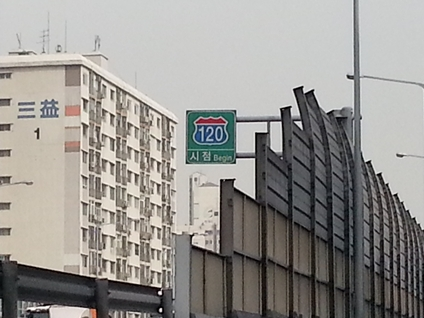
Expressway Start Sign(Incheon)

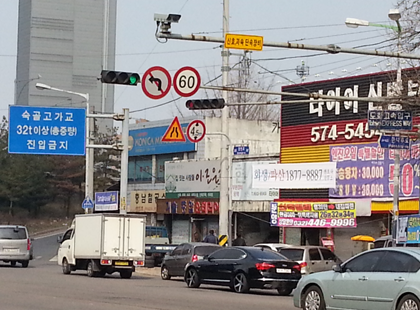
Dowha IC (Nam-gu, Incheon)

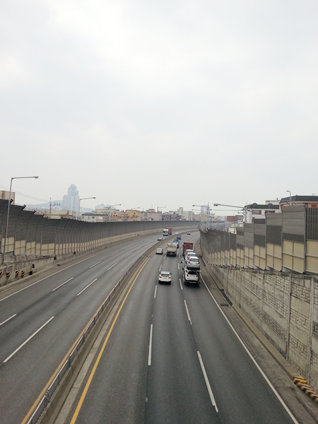
Gyeonginbuk-gil 387, on the overhead bridge
(West, Incehon direction)

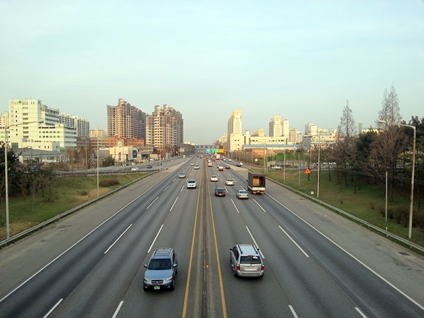
On the Bupyeong IC Viaduct
(East, Seoul direction)

== Sources ==
- Incheon Metropolitan City (March–April 2020). 신호등 없는 최초의 도로와 꽃 피고 새 우는 신개념 도로 [The First Road Without Traffic Lights and a New Concept Road Where Flowers Bloom and Birds Sing]. Incheon Now Vol. 62 (in Korean). Incheon Metropolitan City.

== See also ==
- Roads and expressways in South Korea
- Transportation in South Korea
- Incheondae-ro
