= Muan–Gwangju Expressway =

Expressway in South Korea

Expressway No.12
- Muan-Gwangju Expressway 무안광주고속도로

Route information
- Length: 41.3 km (25.7 mi)
- Existed: 11 September 2007–present

Major junctions
- East end: Muan County, South Jeolla Province
- West end: Gwangsan District, Gwangju

Location
- Country: South Korea
- Major cities: Muan County, Hampyeong County, Naju, Gwangju

Highway system
- Highway systems of South Korea; Expressways; National; Local

- Muan–Gwangju Expressway
- Hangul: 무안광주고속도로
- Hanja: 務安光州高速道路
- RR: Muan Gwangju gosok doro
- MR: Muan Kwangju kosok toro

Muan–Gwangju Expressway (Korean: 무안광주고속도로) also known as 12th Expressway is an expressway in South Korea connecting Muan County to Gwangju.

Formerly, this route designated as part of the Olympic Expressway but on January 3, 2008, it was separated into two segments that shared the same designation number with Gwangju-Daegu Expressway.

== History ==
- November 8, 2007: Muan Airport IC - Naju IC (30.4 km) opened.
- May 28, 2008: Naju IC - Unsu IC (11 km) opened.
- September 29, 2009: West Gwangsan IC opened.

== Compositions ==
Lanes

- All section: 4 lanes

Length

- 41.35 km

Speed limit

- 100 km/h

== Major stopovers ==
South Jeolla Province

- Muan County (Mangun-myeon - Hyeongyeong-myeon - Muan-eup) - Hampyeong County (Hampyeong-eup - Eomda-myeon - Hakgyo-myeon - Daedong-myeon) - Naju (Munpyeong-myeon - Noan-myeon)

Gwangju

- Gwangsan District (Dongsan-dong - Yonggok-dong - Yong-dong - Jijuk-dong - Seobong-dong - Seonam-dong - Unsu-dong)

== List of facilities ==
- IC: Interchange, JC: Junction, SA: Service Area, TG:Tollgate

No.	Name	Korean name	Distance		Connection	Location		Note
1	Muan Airport	무안공항	-	0.00	National Route 77 (Gonghang-ro); Local Route 815 (Unhae-ro)	South Jeolla	Muan County	
2	Muan Airport TG	무안공항 요금소			National Route 24 (Hamjang-ro·Hyeonhae-ro); National Route 77 (Gonghang-ro·Hyeonhae-ro); Local Route 60 (Gonghang-ro)	South Jeolla	Muan County	Main-tollgate
2	N.Muan	북무안	4.65	4.65	National Route 24 (Hamjang-ro·Hyeonhae-ro); National Route 77 (Gonghang-ro·Hyeonhae-ro); Local Route 60 (Gonghang-ro)	South Jeolla	Muan County	Main-tollgate
3	Hampyeong JC	함평 분기점	4.97	9.62	Seohaean Expressway	South Jeolla	Hampyeong County	
SA	Hampyeong-Nabi SA	함평나비휴게소				South Jeolla	Hampyeong County	Both-direction
4	E.Hampyeong	동함평	6.02	15.64	National Route 1 (Yeongsan-ro); National Route 23 (Hamyeong-ro); National Route 24 (Hamjang-ro); Local Route 60 (Yeongsan-ro); Hakdong-ro	South Jeolla	Hampyeong County	
5	Munpyeong	문평	5.13	20.77	Local Route 825 (Cheam-ro)	South Jeolla	Naju	
6	Naju	나주	9.63	30.40	Local Route 822 (Noansamdo-ro)	South Jeolla	Naju	
7	W.Gwangsan	서광산	4.38	34.78	Local Route 49 (Bitgaramjangseong-ro); Yeonsan-ro	Gwangju	Gwangsan District	
TG	E.Gwangsan TG	동광산 요금소				Gwangju	Gwangsan District	Main-tollgate
8	Unsu	운수	6.57	41.35	National Route 13 (Donggok-ro); National Route 22 (Eodeung-daero); Mujin-daero	Gwangju	Gwangsan District	Terminus
Connected with Mujin-daero Next segment: Gwangju-Daegu Expressway

== See also ==
- Roads and expressways in South Korea
- Transportation in South Korea
