= Namhae Expressway Branch 3 =

Expressway in South Korea

Expressway No.105
- Namhae Expressway 3rd Branch

Route information
- Length: 15.3 km (9.5 mi)
- Existed: 2017–present

Major junctions
- South end: Jinhae-gu, Changwon, South Gyeongsang
- 5
- North end: Gimhae, S. Gyeongsang

Location
- Country: South Korea

Highway system
- Highway systems of South Korea; Expressways; National; Local

The Namhae Expressway Branch 3, or the Namhae Expressway 3rd Branch (Korean: 남해고속도로제3지선) is an expressway in South Korea, connecting Changwon to Gimhae. It is branch line of Namhae Expressway.

== Constructions ==
=== Lanes ===
- 4 lanes

=== Length ===
- 15.26 km

=== Limited Speed ===
- 50-100 km/h
