= Hi-pass =

Wireless toll payment system

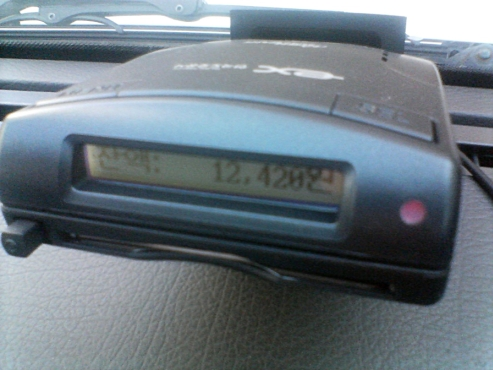
Hi-pass vehicle terminal

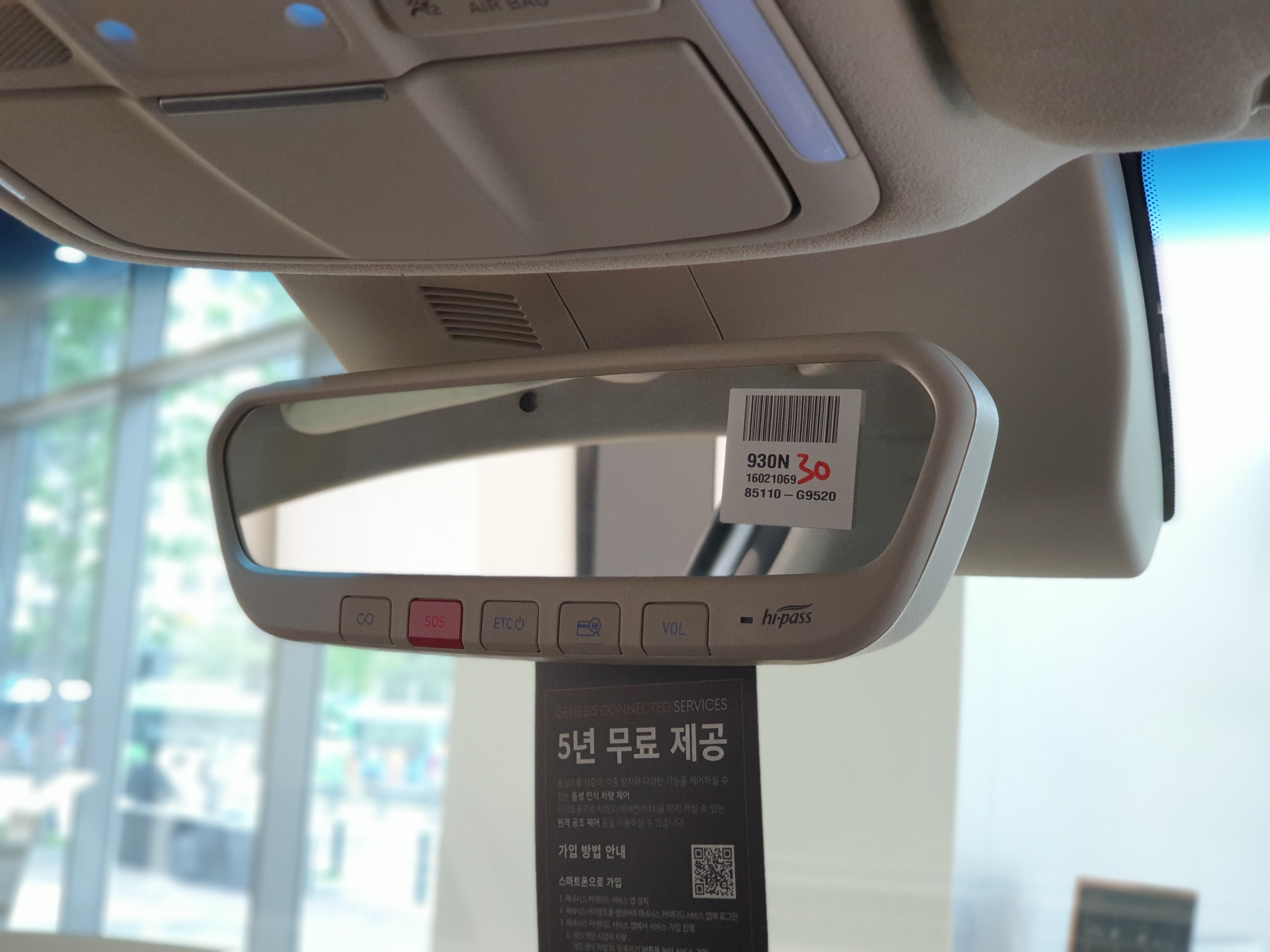
Genesis G70 vehicle with Hi-pass Terminal

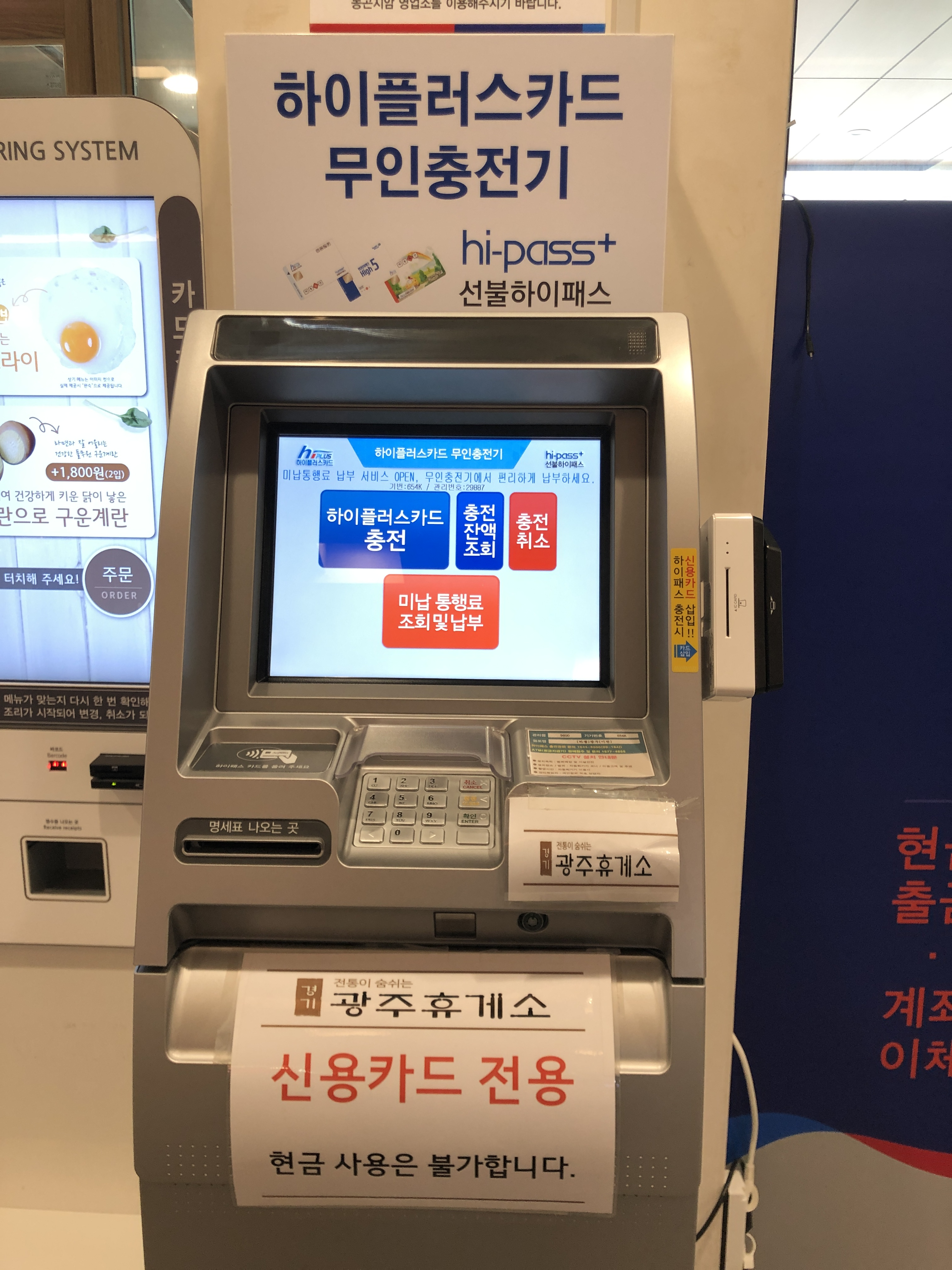
Gyeonggi Gwangju Rest Area Hi Plus Card Unmanned Charger

Hi-pass (Korean: 하이패스) is an electronic toll collection system for the expressways in South Korea that allows motorists to make wireless toll payments, without the need to stop.

Hi-Pass was created to avoid congestion on major roads and in urban areas. It’s a system that can be installed in vehicles, and once passed through a toll gate, it will automatically charge the road usage fee to the rechargeable Hi-pass card. There is no need to stop or reduce speed to pay. It helps prevent mismatches between the number of vehicles and the limited road capacity, which could otherwise lead to significant traffic jams on main highways.

Automobile ownership in Korea increased from just over 2 million in 1988 to over 11 million in 1999, resulting in a 40% annual increase (Chang, 2002). Transportation experts in Korea had to take action in response to the rising pressure on urban mobility. With a growing number of vehicles traveling farther and more frequently, the nation’s primary highway networks were reaching their limits. Toll road funding essentially charges tolls to fund road improvements and to repay project costs (Chang, 2002). It was necessary to recoup the money borrowed from international banks to build new roads and mitigate the increasing traffic problems, especially in the metropolitan areas of the Peninsula.

Hi-Pass is also used in public transportation, railways, and subways. However, it does not fully consider accessibility for disabled individuals, such as those with mental disabilities, wheelchair users, or the blind. Hi-Pass designed antennas for use in a free-pass system for people with disabilities. Subway free-pass system allows transportation for disadvantaged individuals with a gate-free pass card in their possession to approach the gate, which then opens automatically (Lee, 2025). This system provides more convenience and better meets their needs.

It uses DSRC (Dedicated Short-Range Communication), allowing for automatic settlement of tolls, by communication between the car terminal and the toll gate equipment.

== Usage ==
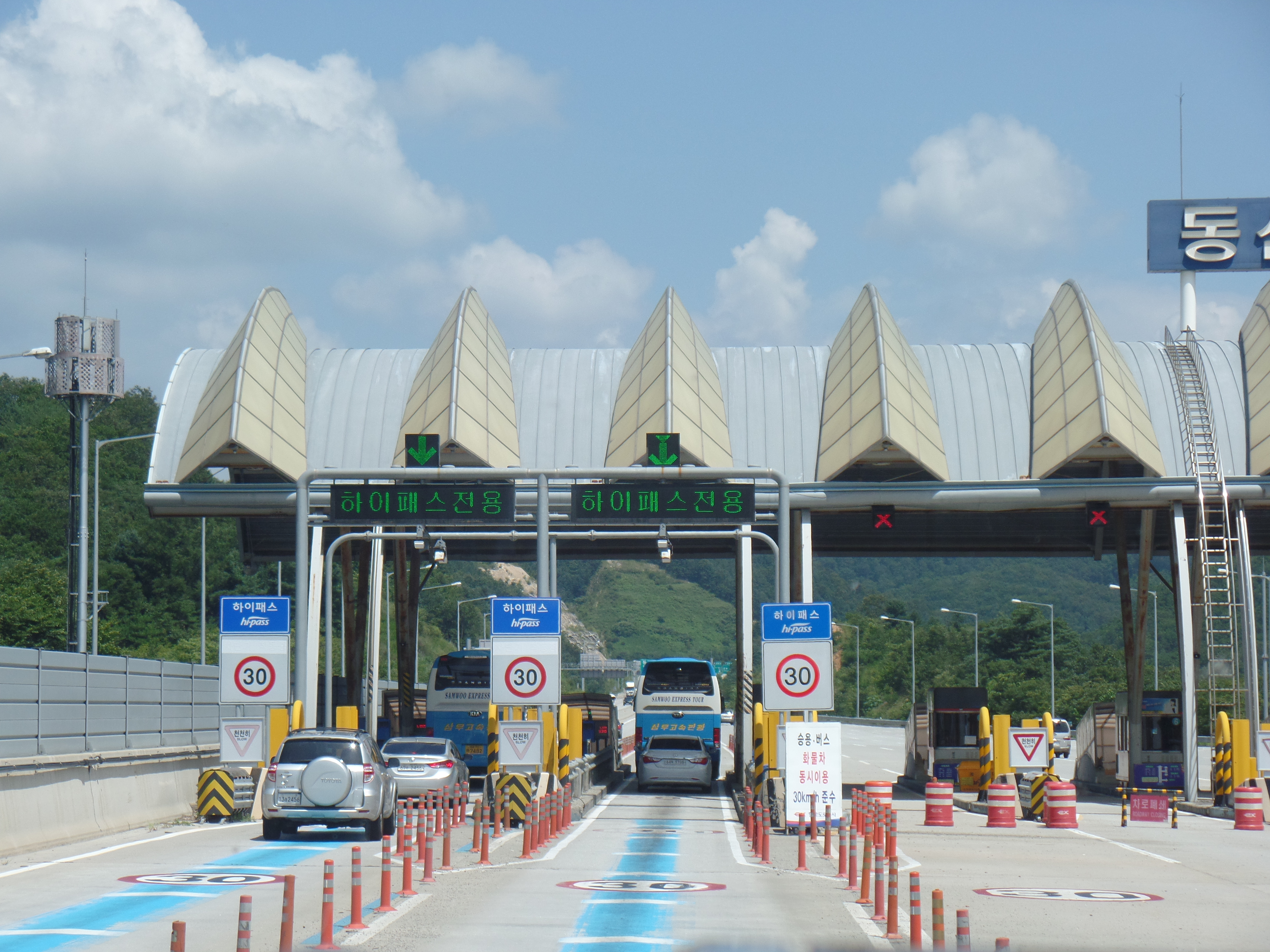
Hipass-only lane in Dongsan TG, Seoul-Yangyang Expressway

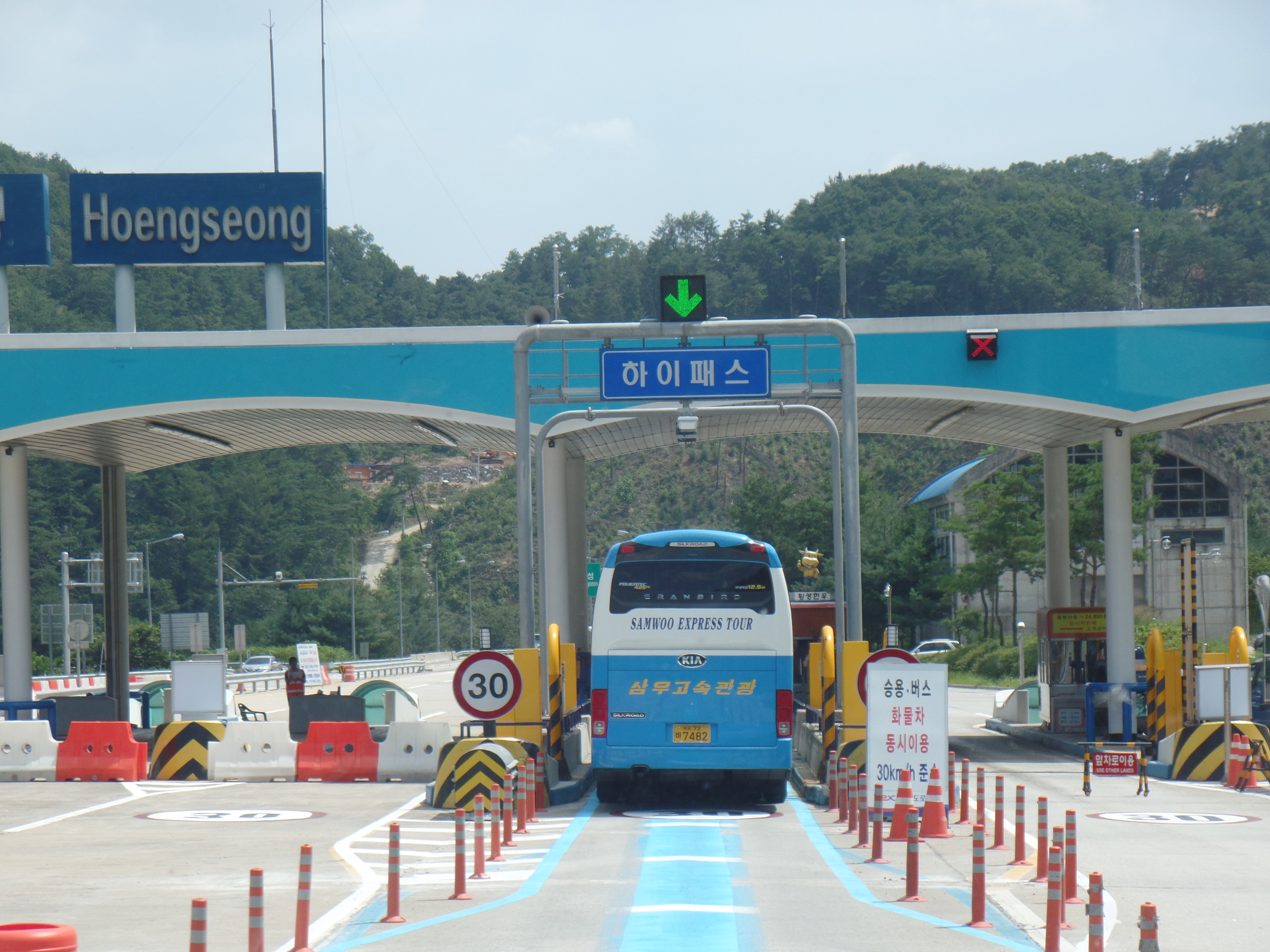
Hipass-only lane in Hoengseong IC TG, Jungang Expressway

Pre-paid Hi-Pass cards can be bought and charge at convenience stores, highway rest areas, the Hi-Plus Card website, and sales offices. The card can be registered on the official website; it is necessary to have a vehicle registration and a driver’s license. Card must have money in order to use it. When passing through a toll gate, the fare will be deducted from the Hi-Pass card balance.

There is also a post-paid Hi-Pass card, which works like a credit card and has an annual fee of 5,000 won. This card can be linked to a credit or debit card and automatically pays tolls each month. It can be purchased from various companies, such as Hyundai and Shinhan.

To use the Hi-Pass card, it is necessary to have an On-Board Unit (OBU). The OBU holds the Hi-Pass card and allows toll gates to read it using RFID technology. Additionally, tolls are discounted for users who purchase toll cards in advance and use the system during peak periods—06:00 to 09:00 in the morning and 18:00 to 22:00 in the evening (Chang, 2002).

From the highway toll gate to the Hi-pass lane, it is a blue line. If you accidentally pass through the toll gate with a Hi-pass lane without a Hi-Pass terminal, you can explain it to the staff at the last toll gate.

== History ==
2000

- January 6: Korea Expressway Corporation announces plan for trial run from March 2000
- June 30: Hi-pass trial run conducted at three toll gate locations, Seongnam, Cheonggye, and Pangyo; one car for each south-bound lane, total of six cars

2001

- April: Suspension of leases of new terminals due to an issue of using frequencies of the Ministry of Information and Communication

2005

- October 31: Introduction of additional Hi-pass toll gate locations, including Incheon, Nam-Incheon, Hanam, and Topyeong

2007

- December 20: Full operation at all toll gate locations country-wide

2008

- April 1: Management of Hi-pass+ card transferred from Korea Expressway Corporation to Hi-pass+ Card Co., Ltd.
- September 1: Commencement of issuance of Hi-pass terminals for box trucks under 4.5 tons and trucks under 1.5 tons
- October 6: Achieved a 30% average usage rate country-wide
- October 16: Suspension of new leases of Hi-pass terminals, continued instead with selling terminals

2009

- March 25: Introduction of post-pay Hi-pass car service / Discontinuation of pre-pay electronic card charging system

2010

- July 1: Expansion of Hi-pass usage of trucks under 4.5 tons (box trucks and open freight trucks)
- December 2: Achieved a 50% average usage rate country-wide

2011

- November 28: Expansion of Hi-pass usage of specialized vehicles, including tow trucks

2014

- September 1: Introduction of Hi-pass "Happy Terminal"

2015

- October 12: Introduction of Hi-pass "Happy Terminal" for trucks prior to expanding Hi-pass usage for trucks over 4.5 tons
- October 15: Expansion of usage of Hi-pass for trucks over 4.5 tons (length of less than 2.5 m, height of loaded freight less than 3.0 m)

2016

- March 29: Conversion to Hi-pass exclusive usage for trucks more than 4.5 tons

2017

- October: Introduction of smart tolling system at Nam-Sooncheon toll gate and Namhae Expressway Seoyeongam toll gate

== See also ==
- Electronic toll collection
- Expressway in South Korea
- Road transport in South Korea
- Korea Expressway Corporation
