= Gwangju–Daegu Expressway =

Expressway in South Korea

Coordinates: 35.159545°N 126.852601°E

Expressway No.12
- Gwangju-Daegu Expressway

Route information
- Length: 183 km (114 mi)

Major junctions
- West end: Munheung Junction in Gwangju; Honam Expressway
- East end: Okpo Junction in Dalseong County, Daegu; Guma Expressway(Jungbu naeryuk Expressway Branch Line)

Location
- Country: South Korea
- Major cities: Namwon

Highway system
- Highway systems of South Korea; Expressways; National; Local

- Gwangju–Daegu Expressway
- Hangul: 광주대구고속도로
- Hanja: 光州大邱高速道路
- RR: Gwangju Daegu gosok doro
- MR: Kwangju Taegu kosok toro

The Gwangju–Daegu Expressway (Korean: 광주대구고속도로) formerly 88 Olympic Expressway (88올림픽고속도로) is a freeway in South Korea, connecting Gwangju to Daegu (175.3 km). It was only expressway that has 2 lanes in South Korea.

== History ==
- 14 November 1973: Goseo-Damyang Segment opens to traffic for Branch Line of Honam Expressway
- 11 October 1981: Construction Begin
- 11 August 1984: Damyang-Okpo segment opens to traffic. (2 Lanes)
- 7 December 2006: Goseo-Damyang, Goryeong-Okpo segments widen 4~6 lanes.
- 8 November 2007: Muan Airport-Gwangju segment opens to traffic. (4 Lanes)
- 22 December 2015: Damyang~Goryeong segment will widen 4 lanes.

== Compositions ==
=== Lanes ===
- Goseo JC~Damyang JC, E.Goryeong IC~Okpo JC: 6
- Damyang JC~Damyang IC~E.Goryeong IC: 4

=== Length ===
- 181.6 km

=== Limited Speed ===
- Goseo IC~Damyang IC~ E.Goryeong IC~Okpo JC: 100 km/h

== List of facilities ==
- IC: Interchange, JC: Junction, SA: Service Area, TG:Tollgate
- Muan Airport ~ Gwangju segment's name is Muan–Gwangju Expressway.
- ■: Overlap with Honam expressway

No.	Name	Korean name	Hanja name	Connections	Notes	Location
	Munheung JC	문흥분기점	文興分岐點	Honam Expressway (Expressway route 25); 2sunhwan-ro National Route 29; Provincial Route 55; Provincial Route 60		Buk District, Gwangju
TG	East Gwangju Tollgate	동광주요금소	東光州料金所			
12	Goseo JC	고서분기점	古西分岐點	Honam Expressway (Expressway route 25)		Damyang, Jeollanam-do
13	Damyang JC	담앙분기점	潭陽分岐點	Gochang–Damyang Expressway (Expressway route 253)		
14	Damyang IC	담양나들목	潭陽나들목	National Route 29		
15	Sunchang IC	순창나들목	淳昌나들목	National Route 27		Sunchang, Jeollabuk-do
16	Namwon JC	남원분기점	南原分岐點	Suncheon–Wanju Expressway (Expressway route 27)		Namwon, Jeollabuk-do
17	Namwon IC	남원나들목	南原나들목	National Route 17		
18	E.Namwon IC	동남원나들목	東南原나들목	National Route 19	function of S.Jangsu IC removed on 12 November 2015	
~~18~~	~~S.Jangsu IC~~	~~남장수나들목~~	~~南長水나들목~~	~~National Route 19~~	level crossing Junction, It closed on 12 November 2015. Now used as a 743 road.	~~Jangsu,~~; ~~Jeollabuk-do~~
SA	Jirisan SA	지리산휴게소	智異山休憩所			Namwon, Jeollabok-do
19	Jirisan IC	지리산나들목	智異山나들목	Provincial Route 37		
20	Hamyang IC	함양나들목	咸陽나들목	Provincial Route 37		Hamyang, Gyeongsangnam-do
21	Hamyang JC	함양분기점	咸陽分岐點	Tongyeong–Daejeon Expressway (Expressway route 35)		
22	Geochang IC	거창나들목	居昌나들목	National Route 24, National Route 37		Geochang, Gyeongsangnam-do
23	Gajo IC	가조나들목	加祚나들목	Provincial Route 1099		
SA	Geochang SA	거창휴게소	居昌休憩所			
24	Haeinsa IC	해인사나들목	海印寺나들목	Provincial Route 1084		Hapcheon, Gyeongsangnam-do
25	Goryeong IC	고령나들목	高靈나들목	National Route 26, National Route 33		Goryeong, Gyeongsangbuk-do
26	E.Goryeong IC	동고령나들목	東高靈나들목	National Route 26		
27	Goryeong JC	고령분기점	高靈分岐點	Jungbu Naeryuk Expressway (Expressway route 45)		
SA	Nongong SA	논공휴게소	論工休憩所			Dalseong County, Daegu
28	Okpo JC	옥포분기점	玉浦分岐點	Jungbu Naeryuk Branch Expressway (Expressway route 451)		

== See also ==
- Roads and expressways in South Korea
- Transportation in South Korea
