= Korea Expressway Corporation =

South Korean toll road company

- Type: Government-owned corporation
- Industry: Road transport
- Founded: February 15, 1969
- Headquarters: 77, Hyeoksin 8 ro, Gimcheon-si, Gyeongsangbuk-do, South Korea
- Key people: Ham Jin-gyu, President
- Products: Expressway
- Number of employees: 4,220 (2014)
- Parent: Ministry of Land, Infrastructure and Transport
- Subsidiaries: Busan–Ulsan Expressway Co., Ltd.
- Website: http://www.ex.co.kr/eng/

- Korea Expressway Corporation
- Hangul: 한국도로공사
- Hanja: 韓國道路公社
- RR: Hanguk doro gongsa
- MR: Han'guk toro kongsa

Former logo (1989–2007)

Korea Expressway Corporation (Korean: 한국도로공사) is a South Korean corporation running the toll roads of South Korea.

== Timeline ==
- 1968 – Started construction of Gyeongbu Expressway
- 1969 – KEC founded (capital stock of 50billion won)
- 1970 – Opened whole section of 428 km Gyeongbu Expressway
- 1973 – Opened the era of 1,000 km Expressway network
- 1973 – Established a Survey Institute (Currently Transport Research Institute)
- 1978 – Daily number of vehicles using expressways surpassed 100,000
- 1980 – Launched integrated tolling system
- 1984 – Opened a traffic information broadcasting studio
- 1987 – Total length of expressway exceed 1,500 km
- 1988 – Daily toll revenue surpassed 1 billion won
- 1990 – Total assets exceeded 1 trillion Korea won
- 1994 – Mechanized toll collection system (TCS) at all toll gates
- 1994 – Total assets surpassed 5 trillion won
- 1994 – Introduced the first bus-only lane
- 1997 – Built nationwide independent communications network
- 1999 – Started Hi-Pass pilot project
- 1999 – Opened the era of 2,000 km Expressway network
- 2001 – Opened 423.2 km expressways
- 2003 – Arranged foreign capital at low interest rates (US$500mil, 10year maturity)
- 2007 – Expanded Hi-Pass service to nationwide
- 2007 – Total length of expressways exceed 3,000 km
- 2010 – Rate of Hi-Pass use surpassed 50% and number of Hi-Pass users surpassed 5 million
- 2012 – Opened the era of 4,000 km Expressway network

== See also ==
- Expressways in South Korea
