= Jungbu Naeryuk Expressway =

Road in South Korea

Expressway No.45
- Jungbu Naeryuk Expressway 중부내륙고속도로

Route information
- Length: 301.77 km (187.51 mi)
- Existed: 1977–present

Major junctions
- South end: Naeseo IC in Changwon, Gyeongsangnam-do; Namhae Expressway Branch Line
- Gyeongbu Expressway( AH 1); Dangjn–Yeongdeok Expressway; Pyeongtaek–Yeongwol Expressway; Yeongdong Expressway
- North end: Chasan JC in Namyangju, Gyeonggi-do; Seoul-Yangyang Expressway

Location
- Country: South Korea
- Major cities: Daegu, Gimcheon, Sangju, Chungju, Yeoju, Yangpyeong

Highway system
- Highway systems of South Korea; Expressways; National; Local

- Jungbu Naeryuk Expressway
- Hangul: 중부내륙고속도로
- Hanja: 中部内陸高速道路
- RR: Jungbu naeryuk gosok doro
- MR: Chungbu naeryuk kosok toro

The Jungbu Naeryuk Expressway (Korean: 중부내륙고속도로) is an expressway in South Korea. Numbered 45, it was first constructed in three parts: connecting Yangpyeong to Chungju and Sangju to Gimcheon and Hyeonpung to Changwon. The part of the expressway between Chungju and Sangju was completed at the end of 2004, with the last remaining section being that between Gimcheon and Hyeonpung. The Jungbu Naeryuk Expressway Branch Line (a.k.a. Guma Expressway) is route number 451 and connects Hyeonpung to N. Daegu.

A speed zone exists from Exit 1 to Exit 13 (Masan-Gimcheon). The maximum speed is 100 km/h, and the minimum speed is 50 km/h. Another speed zone exists from north of exit 13 to exit 28 (Gimcheon-N. Yeoju). The maximum speed limit is 110 km/h, and the minimum speed limit is 50 km/h.

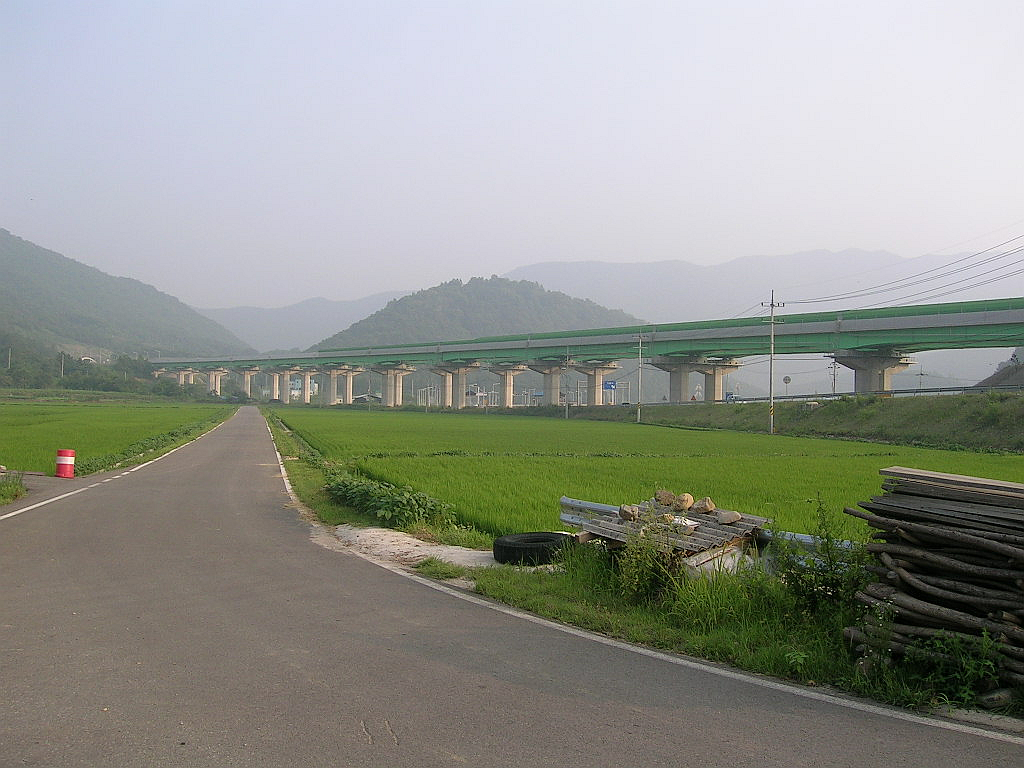
J-N Exp'way in Maseong-myeon, Mungyeong

== History ==
- December, 1977 - Daegu~Masan Section opens to traffic (Guma Expressway)
- September 28, 2001 - Sangju~Gimcheon Section opens to traffic.
- December 20, 2002 - Yeoju~Chungju Section opens to traffic.
- December 15, 2004 - Sangju~Chungju Section opens to traffic.
- November 30, 2007 - Gimcheon~Hyeonpung JC Section opens to traffic.
- September 15, 2010 - Yeoju~N.Yeoju Section opens to traffic.
- December 28, 2012 - N.Yeoju~Yangpyeong Section opens to traffic.

== Information ==
=== Lanes ===
- 4 Lanes

=== Lengths ===
- 301.77 km

=== Speed limit ===
- Naeseo JC ~ Gimcheon JC / N.Yeoju IC~Yangpyeong IC : 100 km/h
- Gimcheon JC ~ N.Yeoju IC : 110 km/h

== Branch line ==
- See Jungbu Naeryuk Expressway Branch

== List of facilities ==
- IC: Interchange, JC: Junction, SA: Service Area, TG:Tollgate

No.	Name	Korean name	Hanja name	Connections	Notes	Location
	Changwon(Naeseo)	창원(내서) 시점	昌原(內西) 始點	Local Route 1004	Expressway Start Spot	Changwon, Gyeongsangnam-do
1	Naeseo JC	내서분기점	內西分岐點	Local Route 30; Local Route 67; Local Route 1004; Namhae Expressway Branch Line	Gwangju-bound only	Changwon, Gyeongsangnam-do
TG	Chirwon TG	칠원요금소	漆原料金所		Main Tollgate	Haman, Gyeongsangnam-do
2	Chirwon JC	칠원분기점	漆原分岐點	Namhae Expressway	Namyangju-bound only	Haman, Gyeongsangnam-do
3	Chilseo IC	칠서나들목	漆西나들목	National Route 5 Local Route 60; Local Route 1041		Haman, Gyeongsangnam-do
SA	Chilseo SA	칠서휴게소	漆西休憩所		Namyangju-bound only	Haman, Gyeongsangnam-do
4	Namji IC	남지나들목	南旨나들목	National Route 5 Local Route 1021; Local Route 1025		Changnyeong, Gyeongsangnam-do
SA	Yeongsan SA	영산휴게소	靈山休憩所		Changwon-bound only	Changnyeong, Gyeongsangnam-do
5	Yeongsan IC	영산나들목	靈山나들목	National Route 5 National Route 79		Changnyeong, Gyeongsangnam-do
6	Changnyeong IC	창녕나들목	昌寧나들목	National Route 20; National Route 24		Changnyeong, Gyeongsangnam-do
8	Hyeonpung JC	현풍분기점	玄風分岐點	Jungbu Naeryuk Expressway; Branch Line		Dalseong County, Daegu
9	Goryeong JC	고령분기점	高靈分岐點	Gwangju-Daegu Expressway		Goryeong, Gyeongsangbuk-do
10	S. Seongju IC	남성주나들목	南星州나들목	Local Route 67		Seongju, Gyeongsangbuk-do
SA	South Seongju·Korea Melon SA	남성주참외휴게소	南星州참외休憩所			Seongju, Gyeongsangbuk-do
11	Seongju IC	성주나들목	星州나들목	National Route 30; National Route 35		Seongju, Gyeongsangbuk-do
SA	Seongju SA	성주휴게소	星州休憩所			Seongju, Gyeongsangbuk-do
12	S. Gimcheon IC	남김천나들목	南金泉나들목	National Route 4		Gimcheon, Gyeongsangbuk-do
13	Gimcheon JC	김천분기점	金泉分岐點	Gyeongbu Expressway( AH 1)		Gimcheon, Gyeongsangbuk-do
14	Seonsan IC	선산나들목	善山나들목	National Route 59		Gumi, Gyeongsangbuk-do
SA	Seonsan SA	선산휴게소	善山休憩所			Gumi, Gyeongsangbuk-do
15	Nakdong JC	낙동분기점	洛東分岐點	Dangjin-Yeongdeok Expressway		Sangju, Gyeongsangbuk-do
16	Sangju IC	상주나들목	尙州나들목	National Route 25		Sangju, Gyeongsangbuk-do
17	N. Sangju IC	북상주나들목	北尙州나들목	National Route 3		Sangju, Gyeongsangbuk-do
18	Jeomchon·Hamchang IC	점촌함창나들목	店村咸昌나들목	National Route 3		Sangju, Gyeongsangbuk-do
SA	Mungyeong SA	문경휴게소	聞慶休憩所			Mungyeong, Gyeongsangbuk-do
19	Mungyeongsaejae IC	문경새재나들목	聞慶새재나들목	National Route 3 National Route 34		Mungyeong, Gyeongsangbuk-do
20	Yeonpung IC	연풍나들목	延豊나들목	National Route 3 National Route 34		Goesan, Chungcheongbuk-do
SA	Goesan SA	괴산휴게소	槐山休憩所			Goesan, Chungcheongbuk-do
21	Goesan IC	괴산나들목	槐山나들목	National Route 19		Goesan, Chungcheongbuk-do
22	Chungju IC	충주나들목	忠州나들목	National Route 3 National Route 36; Local Route 525; Local Route 599		Chungju, Chungcheongbuk-do
22-1 SA	Jungangtap Chungju SA	충주휴게소	忠州休憩所			Chungju, Chungcheongbuk-do
23	Noeun JC	노은분기점	老隱分岐點	Pyeongtaek–Yeongwol Expressway	Changwon-bound only Jecheon-bound only	Chungju, Chungcheongbuk-do
23	N.Chungju IC	북충주나들목	北忠州나들목	Local Route 82; Local Route 525		Chungju, Chungcheongbuk-do
24	Chungju JC	충주분기점	忠州分岐點	Pyeongtaek–Yeongwol Expressway		Chungju, Chungcheongbuk-do
25	Gamgok IC	감곡나들목	甘谷나들목	National Route 38		Eumseong, Chungcheongbuk-do
26	Yeoju JC	여주분기점	驪州分岐點	Yeongdong Expressway		Yeoju, Gyeonggi-do
27	S. Yeoju IC	남여주나들목	南驪州나들목	Local Route 333		Yeoju, Gyeonggi-do
SA	W. Yeoju SA	서여주휴게소	西驪州休憩所			Yeoju, Gyeonggi-do
28	W. Yeoju IC	서여주나들목	西驪州나들목	National Route 42		Yeoju, Gyeonggi-do
29	N. Yeoju JC	북여주분기점	北驪州分岐點	~~Gwangju-Wonju Expressway~~; Local Route 70		Yeoju, Gyeonggi-do
29-1	S. Yangpyeong IC; Yangpyeong Namhangang SA	북여주분기점	北驪州分岐點	Local Route 88; Local Route 98		Yeoju, Gyeonggi-do
30	Yangpyeong IC	양평나들목	楊平나들목	National Route 6		Yangpyeong, Gyeonggi-do

== See also ==
- Roads and expressways in South Korea
- Transportation in South Korea
