= Expressways in South Korea =

National Expressways 고속국도 / Gosokgukdo
- The sign of Gyeongbu Expressway

- A map of the South Korean National Expressway network

System information
- Formed: 2 September 1967 (assigned); 21 December 1968 (opened)

Highway names
- Expressways: XX고속도로 고속국도 n호선 XX선; Expressway n XX Expressway (Expwy)

System links
- Highway systems of South Korea; Expressways; National; Local

Expressways (Korean: 고속도로; Hanja: 高速道路; RR: Gosokdoro) in South Korea, officially known as National Expressways (Korean: 고속국도; Hanja: 高速國道; RR: Gosokgukdo), are controlled-access highways that form the highest level of the country's road network. Most sections are tolled and maintained by the Korea Expressway Corporation, though a few routes are built and managed by approved private companies.

== History ==
On 2 September 1967, the first expressway of South Korea, nowadays Gyeongin Expressway, was assigned as Second-class National Highway 95 Seoul–Incheon (2급국도 제95호선 서울인천선) by the presidential decree. The very first section of expressway was opened on 21 December 1968. At first, expressways were assigned as a part of national highways, but since 31 August 1971, they were assigned as the new separated class: National Expressways.

Under the new numbering scheme implemented on 25 August 2001, expressway numbers were assigned based on a grid system, reflecting the layout proposed in the 3rd Comprehensive National Territorial Planning (Korean: 제3차국토종합개발계획) in 1992. This updated system was influenced by the numbering conventions of the Interstate Highway System in the United States. The details are:

- Trunk routes: These are numbered with two digits. North–south routes are assigned odd numbers, while east–west routes are given even numbers. Primary routes are numbered progressively from south to north or west to east, with the first digit increasing and the last digit ending in either 5 or 0.
- Branch routes: Branch routes off trunk routes have three-digit numbers, with the first two digits corresponding to the main trunk route number.
- Circular routes: Circular routes are numbered in increments of 100, based on the postal code system used from 1988 to 2015.
  - Seoul: 1, Capital Region First Ring Expressway (Expressway 100)
  - Daejeon/Chungcheong: 3, Daejeon Southern Ring Expressway (Expressway 300)
  - Incheon/Gyeonggi: 4, Capital Region Second Ring Expressway (Expressway 400)
  - Gwangju/Jeolla: 5, Gwangju Ring Expressway (Expressway 500)
  - Busan/South Gyeongsang: Busan Ring Expressway (Expressway 600)
  - Daegu/North Gyeongsang: Daegu Ring Expressway (Expressway 700)
- Route numbers ranging from 70 to 99 are reserved for potential use following Korean reunification and are currently unused.
- There are a few exceptions:
  - The Gyeongbu Expressway is an exception to the numbering rules. Due to its critical importance in the network, it retains the route number 1.
  - There are multiple east–west branches on Capital Region First Ring Expressway (Expressway 100), but they are not numbered as the rule of branch routes; instead, they are numbered 110, 120, and 130, respectively.

The current highway shield for expressways is inspired by U.S. highway signage, combining the shape of U.S. Highway shields with the red, white, and blue color scheme of U.S. Interstate shields which are the same colors used in the South Korean flag.

Most of the expressway network is managed by the Korea Expressway Corporation. Since 2000, however, some routes have been constructed and operated by private companies under government approval. These privately operated routes are managed for a limited time before transitioning to public control.

== List of expressways ==
| Number | Name | | Origin | Terminus | Length | | Note |
| Number | English | Korean | Origin | Terminus | km | mi | Note |
|---|---|---|---|---|---|---|---|
| | Gyeongbu | 경부고속도로 | Geumjeong, Busan | Seocho, Seoul | 416.1 | 258.6 | |
| | Namhae | 남해고속도로 | Haksan, Yeongam | Haeryong, Suncheon | 106.8 | 66.4 | |
| | Namhae | 남해고속도로 | Seo, Suncheon | Buk, Busan | 166.3 | 103.3 | |
| | Muan–Gwangju | 무안광주고속도로 | Mang-un, Muan | Gwangsan, Gwangju | 41.3 | 25.7 | |
| | Gwangju–Daegu | 광주대구고속도로 | Buk District, Gwangju | Okpo, Dalseong | 176.0 | 109.4 | Partially concurrent with Honam Expwy |
| | Hamyang–Ulsan | 함양울산고속도로 | Jigok, Hamyang | Cheongnyang, Ulju | 144.6 | 89.9 | Partially opened |
| | Seohaean | 서해안고속도로 | Samhyang, Muan | Geumcheon, Seoul | 336.1 | 208.8 | |
| | Ulsan | 울산고속도로 | Eonyang, Ulju | Nam, Ulsan | 14.3 | 8.9 | |
| | Iksan–Pyeongtaek | 익산평택고속도로 | Wanggung, Iksan | Anjung, Pyeongtaek | 131.7 | 81.8 | Partially opened Private operation |
| | Pyeongtaek–Paju | 평택파주고속도로 | Oseong, Pyeongtaek | Gunnae, Paju | 117.7 | 73.1 | Partially opened Private operation |
| | Saemangeum–Pohang | 새만금포항고속도로 | Jinbong, Gimje | Sanggwan, Wanju | 55.1 | 34.2 | Under construction |
| | Saemangeum–Pohang | 새만금포항고속도로 | Sanggwan, Wanju | Janggye, Jangsu | 36.5 | 22.7 | |
| | Saemangeum–Pohang | 새만금포항고속도로 | Dong, Daegu | Heunghae, Pohang | 69.4 | 43.1 | |
| | Honam | 호남고속도로 | Seo, Suncheon | Mokcheon, Cheonan | 276.2 | 171.6 | Partially in private operation (previously separated as Nonsan–Cheonan Expwy) |
| | Suncheon–Wanju | 순천완주고속도로 | Haeryong, Suncheon | Yongjin, Wanju | 117.8 | 73.2 | |
| | Sejong–Pocheon | 세종포천고속도로 | Guri | Sinbuk, Pocheon | 44.6 | 27.7 | Private operation |
| | Sejong–Pocheon | 세종포천고속도로 | Geumgwang, Anseong | Guri | 72.2 | 44.9 | |
| | Sejong–Pocheon | 세종포천고속도로 | Janggun, Sejong | Geumgwang, Anseong | 55.9 | 34.7 | Under construction |
| | Seosan–Yeongdeok | 서산영덕고속도로 | Daesan, Seosan | Yeongdeok, Yeongdeok | 330.8 | 205.5 | Partially opened Partially concurrent with Honam Branch and Gyeongbu Expwy |
| | Dangjin–Cheongju | 당진청주고속도로 | Songak, Dangjin | Ochang, Cheongju | 71.8 | 44.6 | Partially opened Partially in private operation Partially concurrent with Gyeongbu Expwy |
| | Tongyeong–Daejeon | 통영대전고속도로 | Yongnam, Tongyeong | Dong, Daejeon | 215.3 | 133.8 | |
| | Jungbu | 중부고속도로 | Nami, Cheongju | Hanam | 117.2 | 72.8 | |
| | 2nd Jungbu | 제2중부고속도로 | Majang, Icheon | Hanam | 31.1 | 19.3 | |
| | Pyeongtaek–Yeongwol | 평택제천고속도로 | Cheongbuk, Pyeongtaek | Yeongwol | 127.4 | 79.2 | |
| | Jungbu Naeryuk | 중부내륙고속도로 | Naeseo, Changwon | Okcheon, Yangpyeong | 301.7 | 187.5 | |
| | Yeongdong | 영동고속도로 | Namdong, Incheon | Seongsan, Gangneung | 234.4 | 145.6 | |
| | Gwangju–Wonju | 광주원주고속도로 | Chowol, Gwangju | Wonju | 57.0 | 35.4 | Private operation |
| | Jungang | 중앙고속도로 | Sasang, Busan | Chuncheon | 388.1 | 241.2 | Partially in private operation Partially concurrent with Gyeongbu Expwy |
| | Seoul–Yangyang | 서울양양고속도로 | Gangdong, Seoul | Seo, Yangyang | 150.2 | 93.3 | Partially in private operation |
| | Donghae | 동해고속도로 | Haeundae, Busan | Ganggu, Yeongdeok | 131.8 | 81.9 | Partially opened Partially in private operation |
| | Donghae | 동해고속도로 | Geundeok, Samcheok | Sokcho | 122.6 | 76.2 | |
| | Capital Region 1st Ring | 수도권제1순환고속도로 | Seongnam | Seongnam | 128.0 | 79.5 | Partially in private operation |
| | Namhae Branch 1 | 남해고속도로제1지선 | Sanin, Haman | Dong, Changwon | 17.9 | 11.1 | |
| | Namhae Branch 2 | 남해고속도로제2지선 | Gimhae | Sasang, Busan | 20.6 | 12.8 | |
| | Namhae Branch 3 | 남해고속도로제3지선 | Changwon | Jillye, Gimhae | 15.3 | 9.5 | Private operation |
| | 2nd Gyeongin | 제2경인고속도로 | Yeongjong, Incheon | Seongnam | 70.0 | 43.5 | Partially in private operation |
| | Gyeongin | 경인고속도로 | Seohae, Incheon | Yangcheon, Seoul | 13.4 | 8.3 | |
| | Incheon Int'l Airport | 인천국제공항고속도로 | Yeongjong, Incheon | Goyang | 36.5 | 22.7 | Private operation |
| | Gyeyang-Ganghwa | 계양강화고속도로 | Gyegang, Incheon | Ganghwa, Incheon | 29.9 | 18.6 | |
| | Hamyang-Ulsan Branch | 함양울산고속도로지선 | Ulju, Ulsan | Buk, Ulsan | 15.1 | 9.4 | |
| | Seocheon–Gongju | 서천공주고속도로 | Hwayang, Seocheon | Useong, Gongju | 61.4 | 38.2 | |
| | Pyeongtaek–Siheung | 평택시흥고속도로 | Cheongbuk, Pyeongtaek | Siheung | 42.6 | 26.5 | Private operation |
| | Osan–Hwaseong | 오산화성고속도로 | Osan | Hwaseong | 2.6 | 1.6 | Private operation |
| | Yongin–Seoul | 용인서울고속도로 | Yongin | Seocho, Seoul | 22.9 | 14.2 | Private operation |
| | Iksan–Pyeongtaek Branch | 익산평택고속도로지선 | Hyeondeok, Pyeongtaek | Poseung, Pyeongtaek | 5.7 | 3.5 | Private operation |
| | Saemangeum–Pohang Branch | 새만금포항고속도로지선 | Gigye, Pohang | Heunghae, Pohang | 24.0 | 14.9 | Planned |
| | Saemangeum–Pohang Branch | 새만금포항고속도로지선 | Wanggung, Iksan | Sanggwan, Wanju | 24.5 | 15.2 | |
| | Honam Branch | 호남고속도로지선 | Yeonmu, Nonsan | Daedeok, Daejeon | 54.0 | 33.6 | |
| | Gochang–Damyang | 고창담양고속도로 | Gosu, Gochang | Daedeok, Damyang | 42.5 | 26.4 | |
| | Gangjin–Gwangju | 강진광주고속도로 | Jakcheon, Gangjin | Seo, Gwangju | 51.1 | 31.8 | Under construction |
| | Osong Branch | 세종포천고속도로오송지선 | Jeondong, Sejong | Osong, Cheongju | 6.2 | 3.9 | Under construction |
| | Daejeon Southern Ring | 대전남부순환고속도로 | Yuseong, Daejeon | Dong, Daejeon | 20.9 | 13.0 | Partially concurrent with Tongyeong–Daejeon Expwy |
| | Yeongcheon–Sangju | 영천상주고속도로 | Bugan, Yeongcheon | Nakdong, Sangju | 93.9 | 58.3 | Private operation |
| | Seosan-Yeongdeok Branch | 서산영덕고속도로지선 | Hagi, Daejeon | Janggun, Sejong City | 19.1 | 11.9 | |
| | Capital Region 2nd Ring | 수도권제2순환고속도로 | Mado, Hwaseong | Docheok, Gwangju | 63.0 | 39.1 | Private operation |
| | Capital Region 2nd Ring | 수도권제2순환고속도로 | Docheok, Gwangju | Sanbuk, Yeoju | 19.4 | 12.1 | Under construction |
| | Capital Region 2nd Ring | 수도권제2순환고속도로 | Mado, Hwaseong | Ansan | 13.5 | 8.4 | Fully concurrent with Pyeongtaek–Siheung Expwy |
| | Capital Region 2nd Ring | 수도권제2순환고속도로 | Ansan | Siheung | 2.4 | 1.5 | |
| | Capital Region 2nd Ring | 수도권제2순환고속도로 | Jung, Incheon | Yangchon, Gimpo | 28.9 | 18.0 | Private operation |
| | Capital Region 2nd Ring | 수도권제2순환고속도로 | Yangchon, Gimpo | Paju, Paju | 25.4 | 15.8 | Under construction |
| | Capital Region 2nd Ring | 수도권제2순환고속도로 | Paju, Paju | Yangju | 24.8 | 15.4 | Partially opened |
| | Capital Region 2nd Ring | 수도권제2순환고속도로 | Yangju | Soheul, Pocheon | 6.0 | 3.7 | Private operation |
| | Capital Region 2nd Ring | 수도권제2순환고속도로 | Soheul, Pocheon | Okcheon, Yangpyeong | 46.3 | 28.8 | |
| | Jungbu Naeryuk Branch | 중부내륙고속도로지선 | Hyeonpung, Dalseong | Buk, Daegu | 30.0 | 18.6 | |
| | Gwangju Ring | 광주외곽순환고속도로 | Gwangsan, Gwangju | Nam, Jangseong | 9.7 | 6.0 | |
| | Jungang Branch | 중앙고속도로지선 | Gimhae | Yangsan | 18.1 | 112 | |
| | Busan Ring | 부산외곽순환고속도로 | Jinyeong, Gimhae | Ilgwang, Gijang | 48.8 | 30.3 | |
| | Daegu Ring | 대구외곽순환고속도로 | Dalseo, Daegu | Dong, Daegu | 32.9 | 20.4 | |

=== Numbering scheme until 2001 ===
| Route number | | Route name | | Origins (former) | Terminal (former) | Approval |
| Former | Current | English | Korean | Origins (former) | Terminal (former) | Approval |
|---|---|---|---|---|---|---|
| 1 | 1 | Gyeongbu | 경부선 | Seoul | Busan | 8 April 1969 |
| 2 | 120 | Gyeongin | 경인선 | Seoul | Incheon | 2 September 1967 |
| 3 | 25, 251 | Honam | 호남선 | Daejeon | Suncheon | 21 April 1970 |
| 3-2 | 253 | Gwangju Bypass | 광주외곽선 | Jangseong | Damyang | 27 August 1997 |
| 4 | 50 | Yeongdong | 영동선 | Yongin | Gangneung | 31 August 1971 |
| 5 | 65 | Donghae | 동해선 | Sokcho | Donghae | 23 August 1973 |
| 6 | 10, 102 | Namhae | 남해선 | Busan | Suncheon | 8 December 1971 |
| 6-2 | 104 | Namhae 2nd Branch | 남해제2지선 | Busan | Gimhae | 22 June 1978 |
| 6-3 | 10 | Masan Bypass | 마산외곽선 | Changwon | Haman | 27 August 1997 |
| 7 | 45, 451 | Guma | 구마선 | Daegu | Masan | 19 March 1976 |
| 8 | 16 | Ulsan | 울산선 | Ulju | Ulsan | 22 June 1978 |
| 9 | 12 | 88 Olympic | 88올림픽선 | Dalseong | Damyang | 22 June 1978 |
| 10 | 35 | Jungbu | 중부선 | Hanam | Cheongwon | 29 May 1985 |
| 10-2 | 37 | 2nd Jungbu | 제2중부선 | Hanam | Icheon | 27 August 1997 |
| 11 | 15, 50, 110 | Seohaean | 서해안선 | Incheon | Muan | 25 July 1991 |
| 12 | 50 | Singal–Ansan | 신갈~안산선 | Yongin | Ansan | 14 July 1988 |
| 13 | 300 | Daejeon Southern Ring | 대전남부순환선 | Daejeon | Daejeon | 14 July 1988 |
| 14 | 55 | Jungang | 중앙선 | Daegu | Chuncheon | 20 October 1989 |
| 15 | 110 | 2nd Gyeongin | 제2경인선 | Anyang | Incheon | 25 July 1991 |
| 16 | 15 | Seoul–Ansan | 서울~안산선 | Seoul | Ansan | 29 April 1992 |
| 17 | 35 | Daejeon–Tongyeong | 대전~통영선 | Daejeon | Tongyeong | 29 April 1992 |
| 18 | 45 | Jungbu Naeryuk | 중부내륙선 | Yeoju | Dalseong | 29 April 1992 |
| 19 | 55 | Busan–Daegu | 부산~대구선 | Busan | Daegu | 29 April 1992 |
| 19-2 | 551 | Branch of Busan–Daegu | 부산~대구선 지선 | Gimhae | Yangsan | 29 April 1992 |
| 20 | 130 | Incheon International Airport | 인천국제공항선 | Goyang | Incheon | 27 September 1993 |
| 21 | 25 | Cheonan–Nonsan | 천안~논산선 | Cheonan | Nonsan | 1 July 1996 |
| 22 | 30 | Daejeon–Dangjin | 대전~당진선 | Daejeon | Dangjin | 1 July 1996 |
| 23 | 30 | Cheongju–Sangju | 청주~상주선 | Cheongwon | Sangju | 1 July 1996 |
| 24 | 40 | Pyeongtaek–Eumseong | 평택~음성선 | Pyeongtaek | Eumseong | 27 August 1997 |
| 25 | 151 | Gongju–Seocheon | 공주~서천선 | Gongju | Seocheon | 27 August 1997 |
| 26 | 20 | Iksan–Jangsu | 익산~장수선 | Iksan | Jangsu | 27 August 1997 |
| 27 | 22, 20 | Gimcheon–Pohang | 김천~포항선 | Gimcheon | Pohang | 27 August 1997 |
| 27-2 | 20 | Branch of Gimcheon–Pohang | 김천~포항선 지선 | Daegu | Yeongcheon | 27 August 1997 |
| 101 | 100 | Seoul Ring | 서울외곽순환선 | Seongnam | Seongnam | 14 January 1988 |

== Electronic toll collection ==
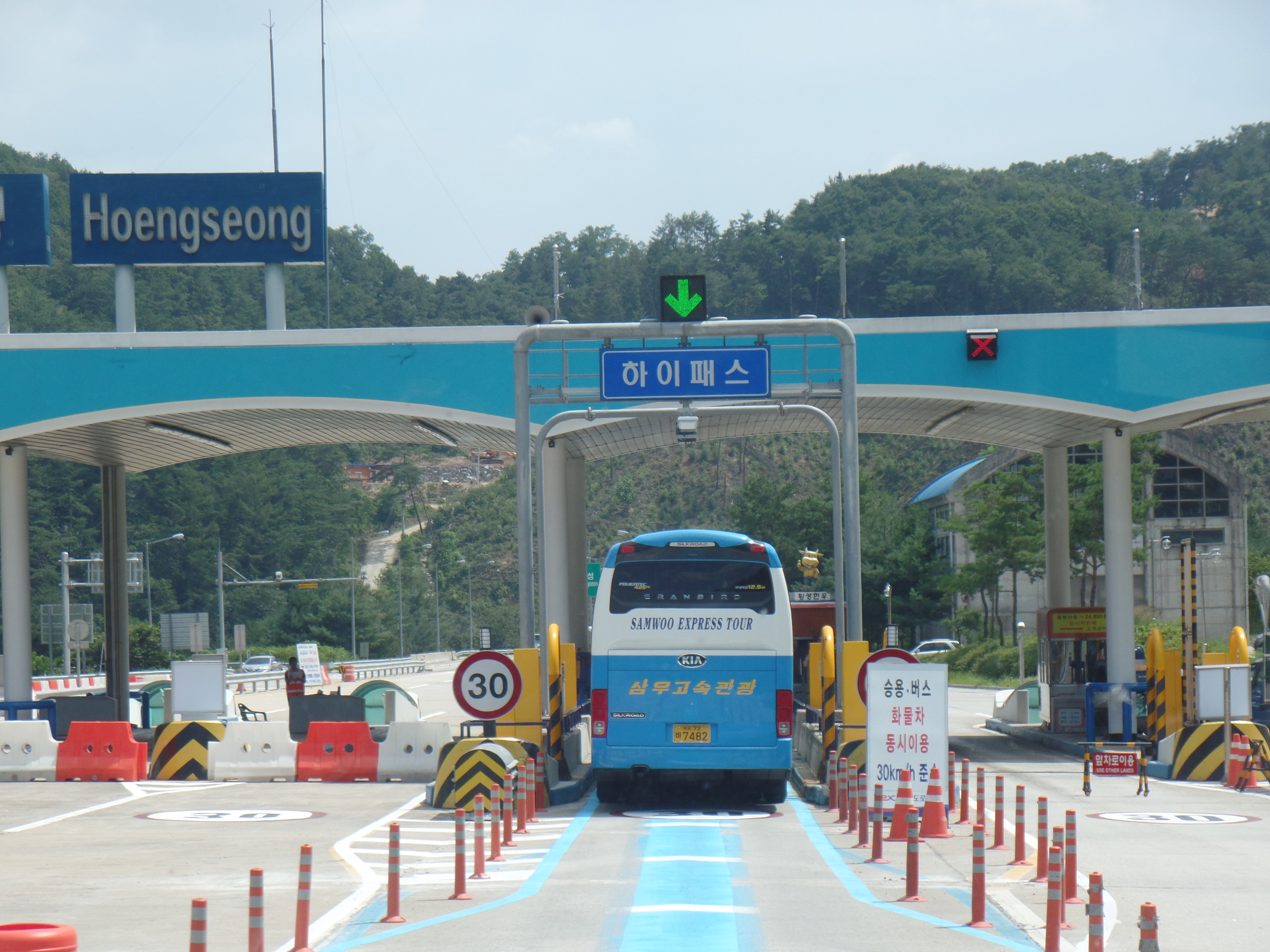
Hipass-only lane in Hoengseong IC TG, Jungang Expressway

Hi-pass is an electronic toll collection system for the expressways in South Korea.

Some interchanges are designed only for cars with hi-pass.

== Traffic restrictions ==
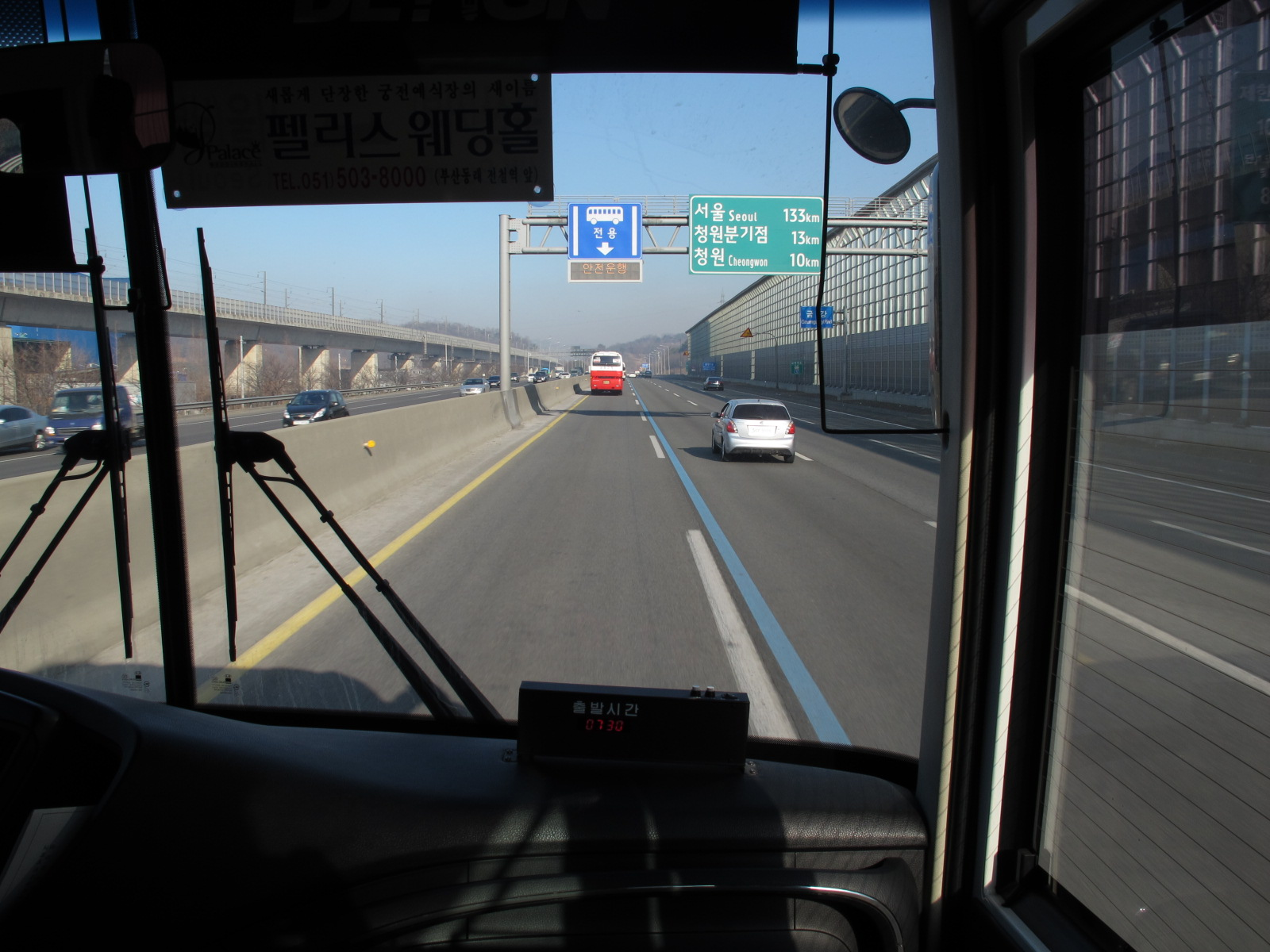
Highway bus lane on Gyeongbu Expressway in the Republic of Korea

From Sintanjin interchange, Daejeon to Yangjae interchange, Seoul, a pair of central lanes are dedicated as a bus lane on holidays; technically, it is operated as HOV-6 with cars with 9+ passenger capacity. On weekdays, the restriction is narrowed to Anseong interchange, Anseong to Yangjae interchange.

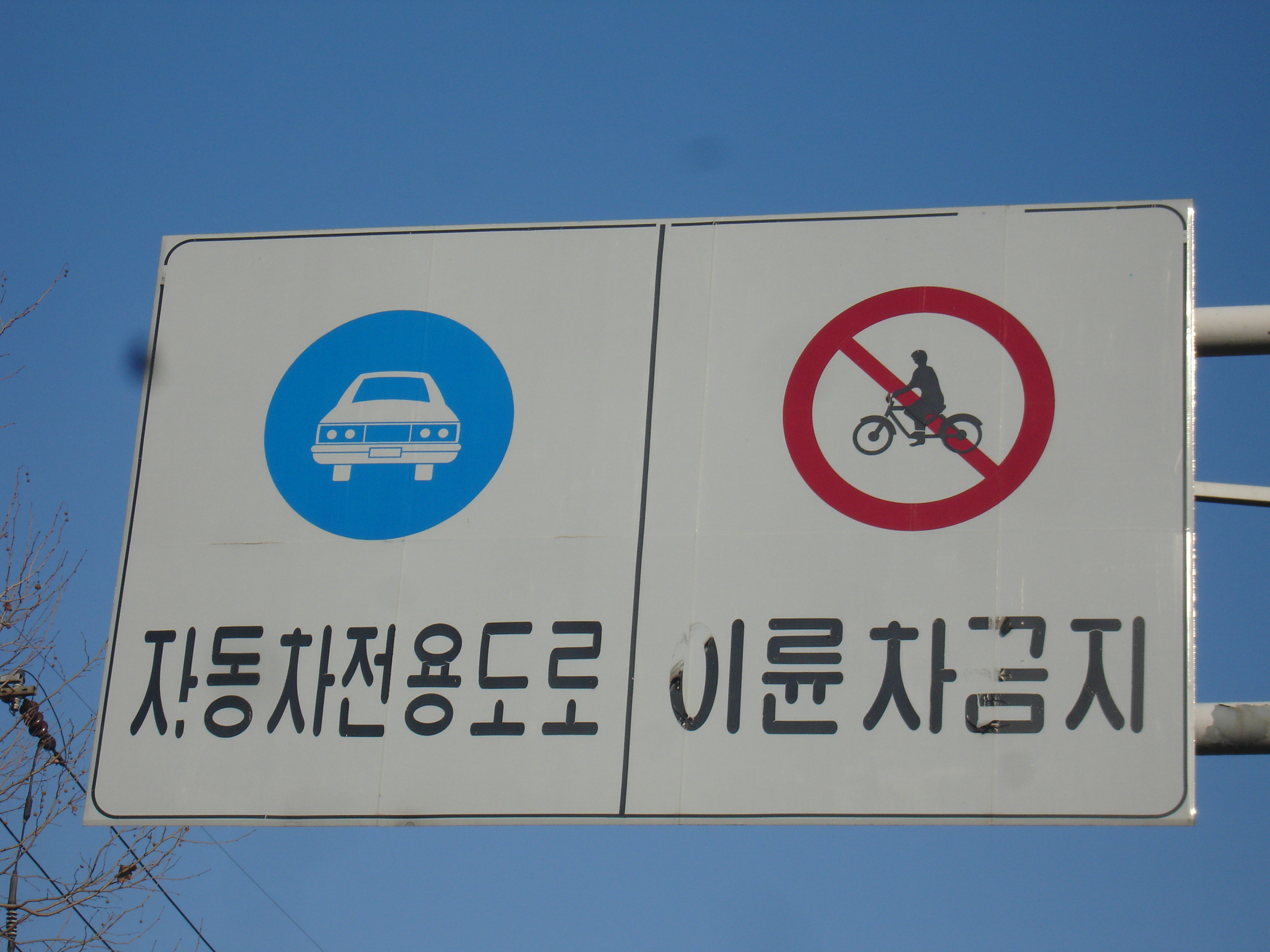
Motorway ahead and no motorcycles sign

Since June 1, 1972, all motorcycles except police motorcycles are prohibited from driving on expressways in South Korea, regardless of engine displacement. Before 1972, motorcycles with an engine displacement greater than 250 cc were permitted on expressways.

Since March 15, 1992, all motorcycles except police motorcycles have been banned from certain other roads designated for motor vehicles only. These roads are marked by a circular blue sign with a white silhouette of a car.

== See also ==
- Transport in South Korea
  - Road transport in South Korea
  - Rail transport in South Korea
  - Rapid transit in South Korea
- Highway system in South Korea
  - National highways of South Korea
  - Local highways of South Korea
  - Motorways in North Korea
