= Namhae Expressway =

Road in South Korea

Expressway No.10
- Namhae Expressway

Route information
- Length: 273.17 km (169.74 mi)
- Existed: 1973–present

Major junctions
- West end: W.Yeongam IC in Yeongam, Jeollanam-do; Seohaean Expressway
- 40
- East end: Deokchen IC in Buk-gu, Busan

Location
- Country: South Korea
- Major cities: Suncheon, Gwangyang, Jinju, Changwon, Gimhae

Highway system
- Highway systems of South Korea; Expressways; National; Local

- Namhae Expressway
- Hangul: 남해고속도로
- Hanja: 南海高速道路
- RR: Namhae gosok doro
- MR: Namhae kosok toro

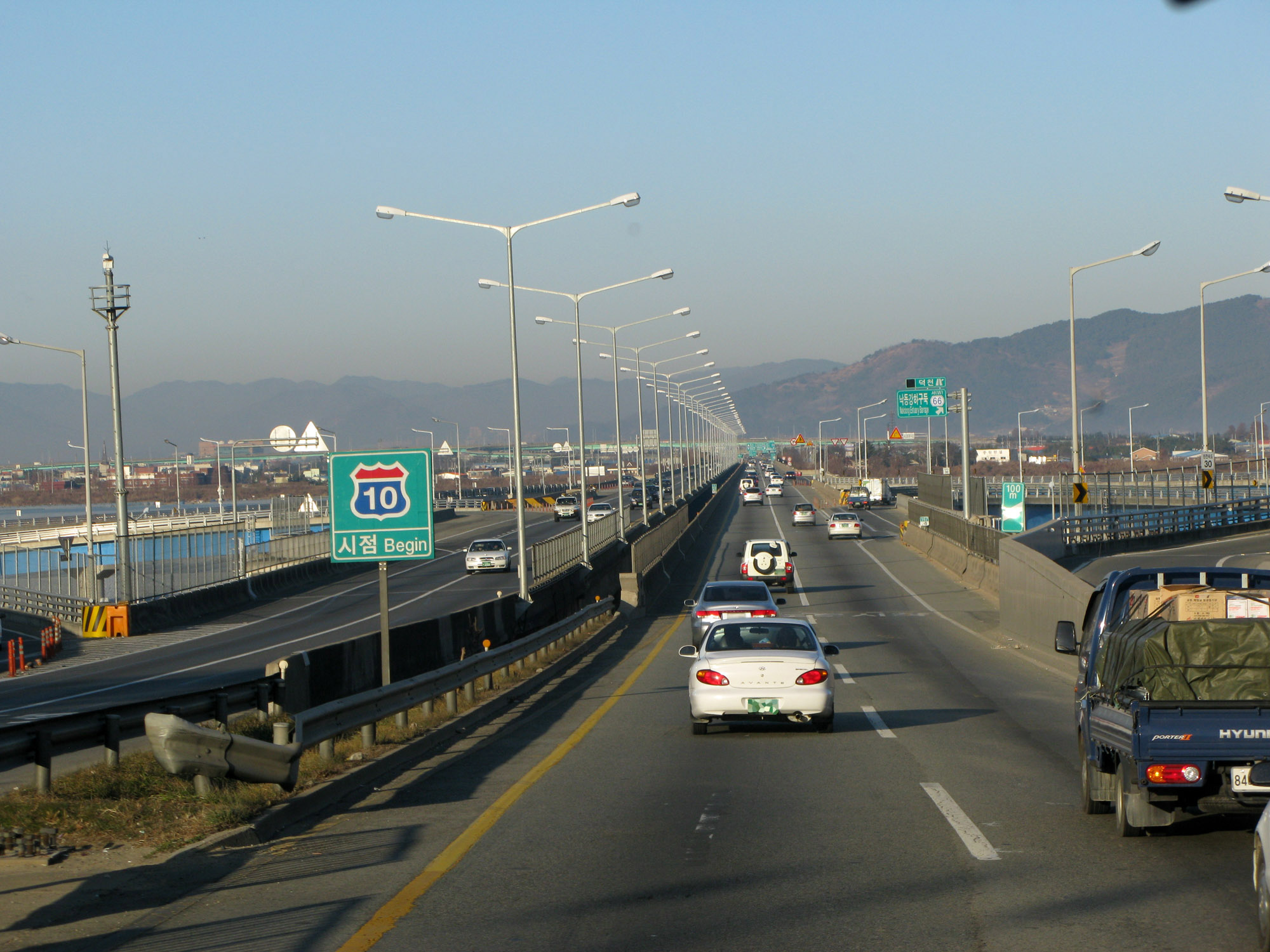
Deokcheon IC, Busan

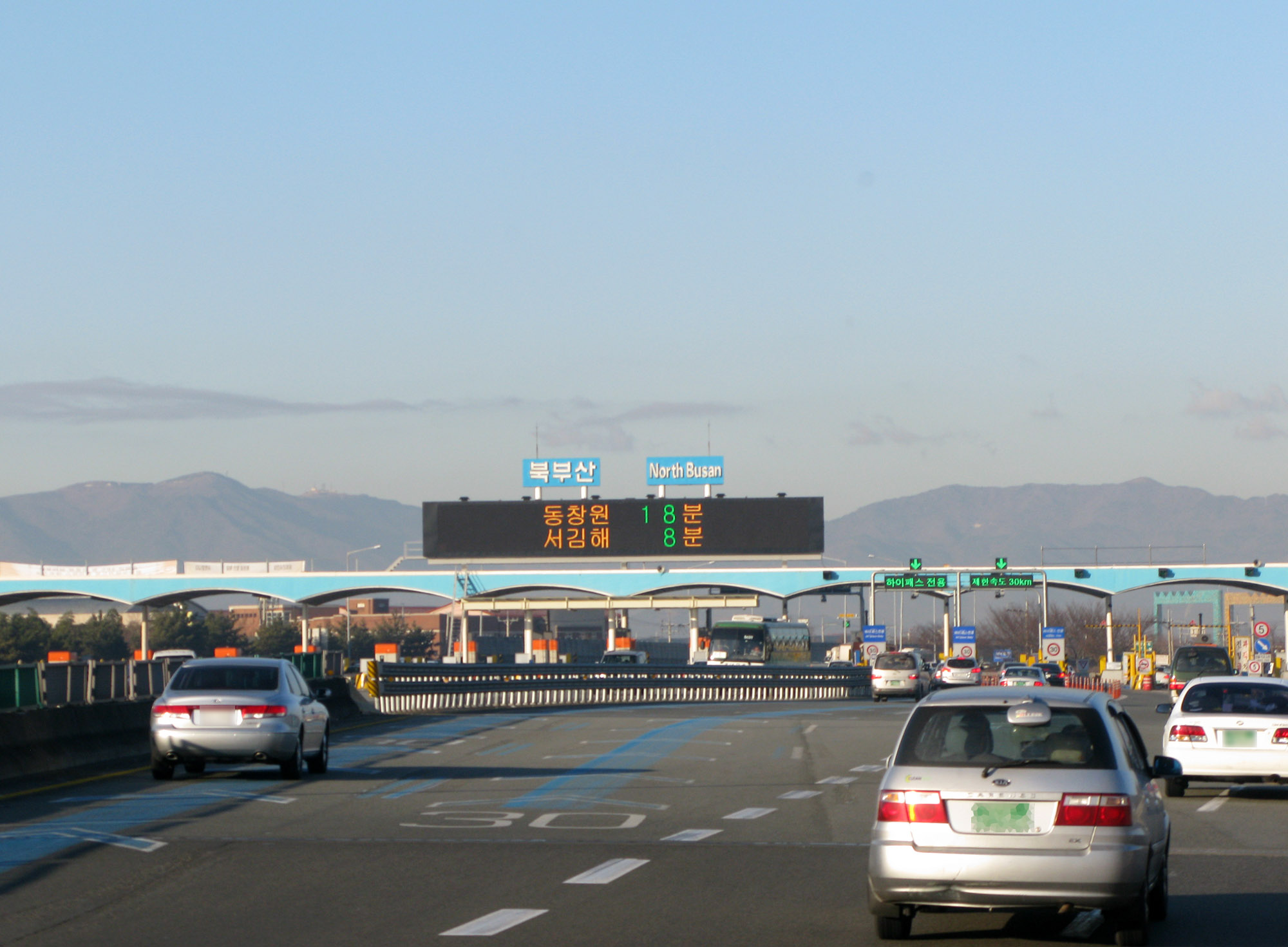
North Busan Tollgate, 2009

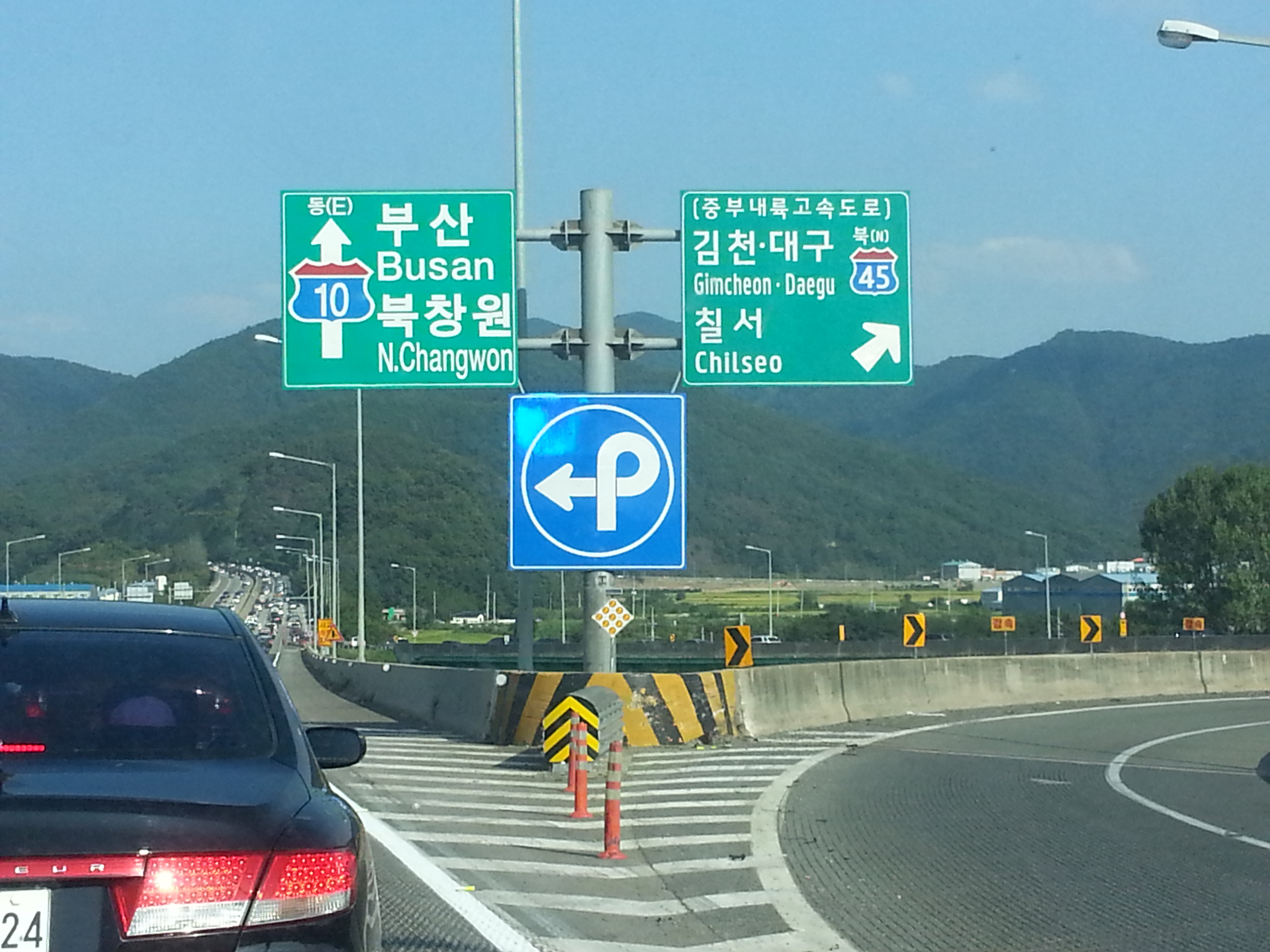
Chirwon JCT, 2013

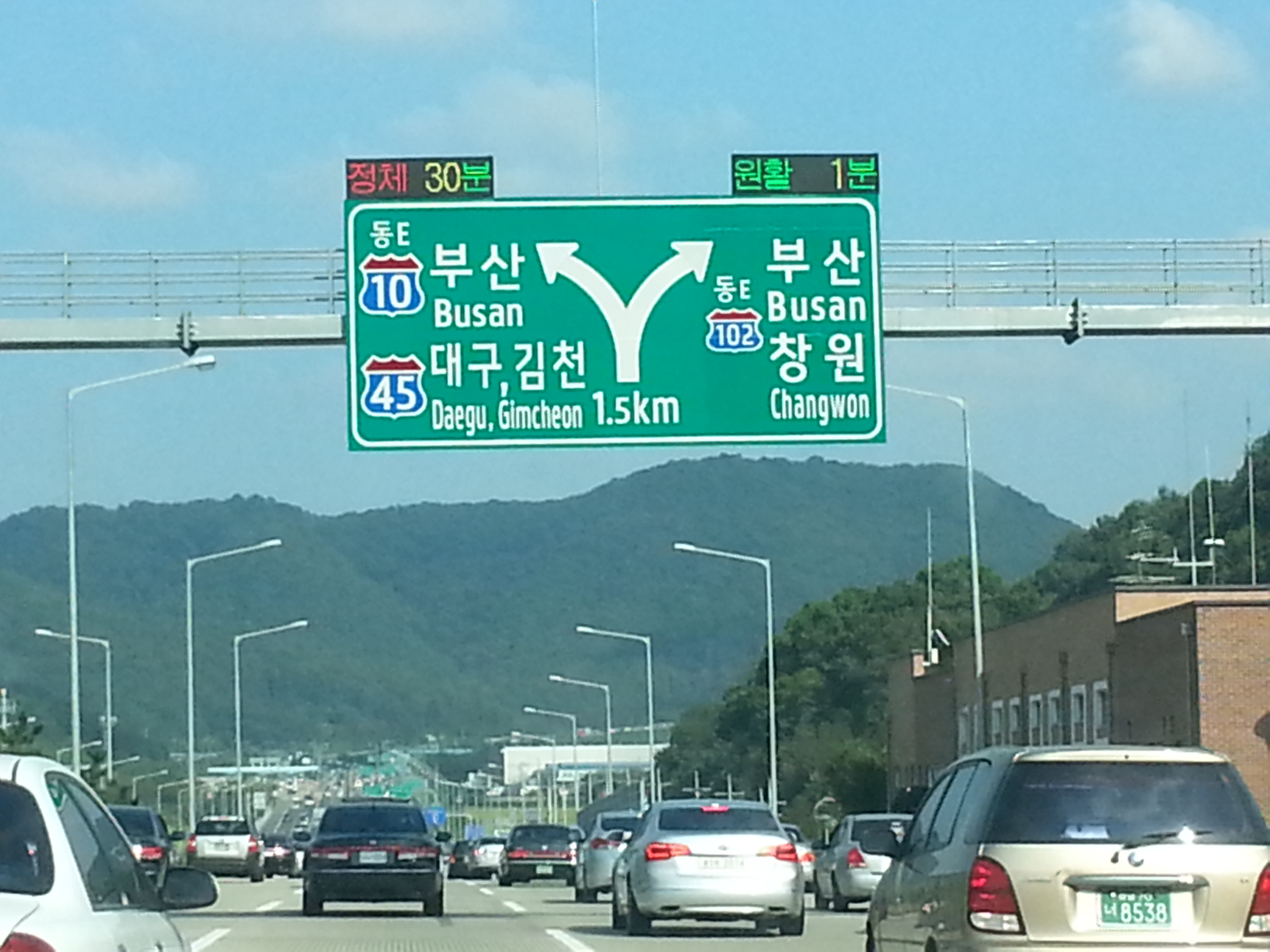
Sanin JCT, 2012

The Namhae Expressway (Korean: 남해고속도로) is a freeway in South Korea, connecting Yeongam to Suncheon, Gwangyang, Jinju, Changwon, and Busan.

It was opened in 1973 with Honam Expressway's Jeonju - Suncheon section, through W.Suncheon IC is connected to the Honam Expressway.

At the time, this was an opening round two-lane road. However, through the expansion progressed from 1977 to 1996 was expanded to four lanes round the entire section.

It was expanded to 8 lanes 2001 Naengjeong JCT ~ Changwon JCT section, with 8 lanes 2011 Sanin JCT ~ Jinju section, Sacheon ~ Jinju section has been expanded to 6 lanes, December 2014 Naengjeong JCT ~ Daejeo JCT section is extended to 6-8 lanes some section have been expanded such that at least 6 lanes.

Yeongam - Suncheon section's construction period by 2002 was inaugurated April 27, 2012. Mokpo and Busan opening section, but this is easily linked to the, not directly in some sections it has the disadvantage of an indirect linkage to the national highway.

== History ==
- 10 November 1972 - Busan-Suncheon construction sector.
- 14 November 1973 - Busan-Suncheon opening section.
- 22 May 1978 - Highway Namhae 2nd Branch construction sector.
- 4 September 1981 - Naengjeong-Sasang of highway Namhae 2nd Branch and 4-lane round-trip of W.Masan - Naejeong opening.
- 7 September 1989 - 4-lane round-trip of Jinju - W.Masan opening.
- 9 November 1991 - Highway Namhae 3rd Branch construction sector.
- 27 December 1995 - Highway Namhae 3rd Branch opens to traffic.
- 1 July 1996 - Highway Namhae 3rd Branch lowered to National Highway(National Route 59)
- 27 April 2012 - Jungnim~Suncheonman opening section. (indirect Connected with Suncheon-Busan)

== Constructions ==
=== Lanes ===
- Jungnim JC~Sacheon IC, Sanin JC~Changwon JC: 4
- Sacheon IC~Jinju JC: 6
- Jinju JC~Sanin JC, Changwon JC~Deokcheon JC: 8

=== Length ===
- Yeongam~Suncheon: 106.84 km
- Suncheon~Busan: 166.33 km

=== Limited Speed ===
- 100 km/h

== List of facilities ==
- IC: Interchange, JC: Junction, SA: Service Area, TG:Tollgate

=== Yeongam~Suncheon(Mokpo~Gwangyang) 106.84km ===
No.	Name	Korean name	Hanja name	Connections	Notes	Location
Connected directly to National Route 2 (Muyeong-ro)
1	W.Yeongam IC	서영암나들목	西靈巖나들목	National Route 2		Yeongam, Jeollanam-do
TG	W. Yeongam TG	서영암요금소	西靈巖料金所		Main Tollgate	Yeongam, Jeollanam-do
2	Seoho-Haksan IC	서호학산나들목	西湖鶴山나들목	Provincial Route 819	Mokpo-bound Only	Yeongam, Jeollanam-do
SA	Yeongam SA	영암휴게소	靈岩休憩所			Yeongam, Jeollanam-do
3	Gangjin·Muwisa IC	강진무위사나들목	康津無爲寺나들목	National Route 2 National Route 13		Gangjin, Jeollanam-do
	~~Gangjin JC~~	~~강진분기점~~	~~康津分岐點~~	~~Gangjin-Gwangju Expressway~~		Gangjin, Jeollanam-do
4	Jangheung IC	장흥나들목	長興나들목	National Route 23		Jangheung, Jeollanam-do
SA	Jangheung Jeongnamjin SA	보성녹차휴게소	寶城綠茶休憩所			Jangheung, Jeollanam-do
5	Boseong IC	보성나들목	寶城나들목	National Route 18; National Route 29		Boseong, Jeollanam-do
SA	Boseong Nokcha SA	보성녹차휴게소	寶城綠茶休憩所			Boseong, Jeollanam-do
6	Beolgyo IC	벌교나들목	筏橋나들목	National Route 2		Boseong, Jeollanam-do
7	Goheung IC	고흥나들목	高興나들목	National Route 15; National Route 27	Gwangyang-bound Only	Goheung, Jeollanam-do
TG	S.Suncheon TG	남순천요금소	南順天料金所			Suncheon, Jeollanam-do
8	Suncheonman IC	순천만나들목	順天灣나들목	National Route 2		Suncheon, Jeollanam-do
9	Dorong IC	도롱나들목	道弄나들목	National Route 17	Mokpo-bound Only; Yeosu-bound Only	Suncheon, Jeollanam-do
9	Haeryong IC	해룡나들목	海龍나들목	National Route 17	Gwangyang-bound Only	Suncheon, Jeollanam-do
Connected directly with National Route 17						Suncheon, Jeollanam-do

=== West Suncheon~Busan 166.33km ===
No.	Name	Korean name	Hanja name	Connections	Notes	Location
Connected directly with Honam Expressway
	Suncheon	순천 시점	順天 始點	Honam Expressway		Suncheon, Jeollanam-do
10	W.Suncheon IC	서순천나들목	西順天나들목	National Route 17; National Route 22		Suncheon, Jeollanam-do
11	Suncheon IC	순천나들목	順天나들목	National Route 17		Suncheon, Jeollanam-do
12	Suncheon JC	순천분기점	順天分岐點	Suncheon–Wanju Expressway		Suncheon, Jeollanam-do
13	Gwangyang IC	광양나들목	光陽나들목	National Route 2 ( Yeongam~Suncheon Section) (indirect connection)		Gwangyang, Jeollanam-do
14	E.Gwangyang IC	동광양나들목	光陽나들목	National Route 2		Gwangyang, Jeollanam-do
15	Okgok IC	옥곡나들목	玉谷나들목	Provincial Route 861		Gwangyang, Jeollanam-do
16	Jinwol IC	진월나들목	津月나들목	National Route 2		Gwangyang, Jeollanam-do
SA	Seomjingang SA	섬진강휴게소	蟾津江休憩所			Gwangyang, Jeollanam-do
17	Hadong IC	하동나들목	河東나들목	National Route 19; National Route 59		Hadong, Gyeongsangnam-do
18	Jingyo IC	진교나들목	辰橋나들목	Provincial Route 1002		Hadong, Gyeongsangnam-do
19	Gonyang IC	곤양나들목	昆陽나들목	Provincial Route 58		Sacheon; Gyeongsangnam-do
SA	Sacheon SA	사천휴게소	泗川休憩所			Sacheon; Gyeongsangnam-do
20	Chukdong IC	축동나들목	杻洞나들목	Provincial Route 1002		Sacheon; Gyeongsangnam-do
21	Sacheon IC	사천나들목	泗川나들목	National Route 3 National Route 33		Sacheon; Gyeongsangnam-do
22	Jinju JC	진주분기점	晉州分岐點	Tongyeong–Daejeon Expressway		Jinju, Gyeongsangnam-do
23	Jinju IC	진주나들목	晉州나들목	National Route 2 National Route 3 National Route 33		Jinju, Gyeongsangnam-do
SA	Jinju SA	진주휴게소	晉州休憩所			Jinju, Gyeongsangnam-do
24	Munsan IC	문산나들목	文山나들목	Provincial Route 1009		Jinju, Gyeongsangnam-do
SA	Munsan SA	문산휴게소	文山休憩所			Jinju, Gyeongsangnam-do
25	Jinseong IC	진성나들목	晉城나들목	Provincial Route 1007		Jinju, Gyeongsangnam-do
26	Jisu IC	지수나들목	智水나들목	Provincial Route 1037		Jinju, Gyeongsangnam-do
27	Gunbuk IC	군북나들목	郡北나들목	National Route 79		Haman; Gyeongsangnam-do
28	Jangji IC	장지나들목	長池나들목	Provincial Route 1029		Haman; Gyeongsangnam-do
SA	Haman SA	함안휴게소	咸安休憩所			Haman; Gyeongsangnam-do
29	Haman IC	함안나들목	咸安나들목	Provincial Route 1011		Haman; Gyeongsangnam-do
30	Sanin JC	산인분기점	山仁分岐點	Namhae 1st Branch Expressway		Haman; Gyeongsangnam-do
31	Chirwon JC	칠원분기점	漆原分岐點	Jungbu Naeryuk Expressway	Daegu-bound Only	Haman; Gyeongsangnam-do
32	N.Changwon IC	북창원나들목	北昌原나들목	National Route 79		Changwon, Gyeongsangnam-do
33	Changwon JC	창원분기점	昌原分岐點	Namhae 1st Branch Expressway		Changwon, Gyeongsangnam-do
34	E.Changwon IC	동창원나들목	東昌原나들목	National Route 14		Changwon, Gyeongsangnam-do
SA 34-1	Jinyeong SA; Jinyeong JC	진영휴게소	進永休憩所	Busan Outer Ring Expressway		Gimhae, Gyeongsangnam-do
35	Jillye IC	진례나들목	進禮나들목	Provincial Route 1042		Gimhae, Gyeongsangnam-do
36	Naengjeong Junction	냉정분기점	冷井分岐點	Namhae 2nd Branch Expressway		Gimhae, Gyeongsangnam-do
37	W.Gimhae IC	서김해나들목	西金海나들목	National Route 14		Gimhae, Gyeongsangnam-do
38	E.Gimhae IC	동김해나들목	東金海나들목	National Route 14		Gimhae, Gyeongsangnam-do
38-1	Gimhae JC	김해분기점	金海分岐點	Jungang Expressway Branch		Gimhae, Gyeongsangnam-do
TG	N. Busan TG	북부산요금소	北釜山料金所		Main Tollgate	Gangseo-gu, Busan
39	Daejeo JC	대저분기점	大渚分岐點	Jungang Expressway; National Route 14		Gangseo-gu, Busan
40	Deokcheon IC	덕천나들목	德川나들목	Gangbyeon-daero		Buk-gu, Busan
	Busan	부산 종점	釜山 終點	Gangbyeon-daero	Expressway Ending Point	Buk-gu, Busan
Connected directly with Gupo~Deokcheon Highway

== Branch lines ==
=== Namhae 1st Branch Expressway ===
Expressway No.102
- Namhae 1st Branch Expressway

Route information
- Length: 17.88 km (11.11 mi)
- Existed: 1973–present

Major junctions
- West end: Sanin JC in Haman, Gyeongsangnam-do; Namhae Expressway
- 4
- East end: Changwon JC in Changwon, Gyeongsangnam-do; Namhae Expressway

Location
- Country: South Korea

Highway system
- Highway systems of South Korea; Expressways; National; Local

The Namhae 1st Branch Expressway (Korean: 남해고속도로 제1지선, Namhae Gosok Doro Je-il(1) Jiseon) is a freeway in South Korea, connecting Haman to Changwon. It is a branch line of the Namhae Expressway.

=== Namhae 2nd Branch Expressway ===
Expressway No.104
- Namhae 2nd Branch Expressway

Route information
- Length: 20.6 km (12.8 mi)
- Existed: 1981–present

Major junctions
- West end: Naengjeong JC in Gimhae, Gyeongsangnam-do; Namhae Expressway
- 5
- East end: Sasang IC in Sasang-gu, Busan

Location
- Country: South Korea

Highway system
- Highway systems of South Korea; Expressways; National; Local

The Namhae 2nd Branch Expressway(Korean:남해고속도로 제2지선, Namhae Gosok Doro Je-i(2) Jiseon) is a freeway in South Korea, connecting Gimhae to Busan. It is Branch Line of Namhae Expressway. Former name is Buma Expressway(부마고속도로).

== See also ==
- Roads and expressways in South Korea
- Transportation in South Korea
