= National Route 17 (South Korea) =

Road in South Korea

National Route 17
- 국도 제17호선

Route information
- Length: 437.8 km (272.0 mi)
- Existed: August 31, 1971–present

Major junctions
- South end: Dolsan-eup, Yeosu
- North end: Docheok-myeon, Gwangju

Location
- Country: South Korea
- Major cities: Suncheon, Namwon, Jeonju, Daejeon, Cheongju, Anseong

Highway system
- Highway systems of South Korea; Expressways; National; Local
← National Route 16	→ National Route 18

National Route 17 (Korean: 국도 제17호선; RR: Gukdo Je Sipchil(17) Hoseon) is a national highway in South Korea. It connects the city of Yeosu to the cities of Suncheon, Namwon, Jeonju, Daejeon, Cheongju, Yongin and Gwangju.

This Road runs parallel to the Jeolla Line(전라선) and the Suncheon–Wanju Expressway, Jungbu Expressway.

== History ==
- August 31, 1971: Became National Route 17 Yeosu ~ Cheongju Line by the General National Highway Route Designation Decree.
- April 28, 1972: Due to route improvement, road zone changed from 2.44 km section in Sangseo-ri ~ Seokbong-ri, Buk-myeon, Daedeok-gun to 2.62 km
- November 30, 1972: Due to route improvement, road zone changed from 254m section in Samgoe-ri, Sannae-myeon, Daedeok-gun to 280m
- April 26, 1974: Due to alignment improvement, road zone changed from 10.5 km section in Gukpyeong-ri, Dunnam-myeon ~ Dugok-ri, Imsil-myeon, Imsil-gun to 9.7 km
- August 8, 1975: Total 736m section from Yongjin-ri, Boksu-myeon ~ Moksan-ri, Jinsan-myeon, Geumsan-gun opened, existing 1.292 km section abolished
- 1976 ~ 1978 Gokseong-gun ~ Namwon-si section starting and 1993 ~ 1997 Chubu-myeon ~ Geumsan-gun section completed.
- January 10, 1981: Jusan-ri, Ssangbong-myeon ~ Deokyang-ri, Sora-myeon, Yeocheon-gun 3.28 km section opened and existing 4.42 km section abolished, Johwa-ri, Yulchon-myeon, Yeocheon-gun ~ Hodu-ri, Haeryong-myeon, Seungju-gun 2.744 km section opened and existing 3.01 km section abolished
- March 14, 1981: Starting point extended from 'Yeosu-si, Jeollanam-do' to 'Dolsan-eup, Yeocheon-gun, Jeollanam-do', end point extended from 'Cheongju-si, Chungcheongbuk-do' to 'Naesa-myeon, Yongin-gun, Gyeonggi-do'. Accordingly became 'Dolsan ~ Yangji Line'.
- April 6, 1981: Dugyo-ri County Line, Ijuk-myeon, Anseong-gun ~ Yangji-ri, Naesa-myeon, Yongin-gun 35 km section upgraded to national highway opened
- April 16, 1981: Yangji-ri, Hyeondo-myeon, Cheongwon-gun ~ Sirwon-ri, Manseung-myeon, Jincheon-gun 49.338 km section upgraded to national highway opened
- May 30, 1981: Road zone changed to the extended 107 km section according to the amendment of Presidential Decree No. 10247 General National Highway Route Designation Decree
- August 17, 1981: Gunnae-ri, Dolsan-myeon, Yeocheon-gun ~ Orim-dong, Yeosu-si 28.07 km section upgraded to national highway opened
- August 11, 1986: Majeon-ri, Chubu-myeon, Geumsan-gun ~ Haso-ri, Sannae-myeon, Daedeok-gun (including Chubu Tunnel) 1.56 km section opened
- September 29, 1986: Existing designated Majeon-ri, Chubu-myeon, Geumsan-gun ~ Haso-ri, Sannae-myeon, Daedeok-gun (old Chubu Tunnel) 1.8 km section abolished
- May 26, 1987: Existing designated Chang-ri, Ochang-myeon, Cheongwon-gun ~ Doha-ri, Munbaek-myeon, Jincheon-gun, Eumnae-ri, Jincheon-eup, Jincheon-gun, Majeon-ri, Chubu-myeon, Geumsan-gun, Chungcheongnam-do sections abolished
- September 22, 1987: Jugam-ri, Hyeondo-myeon, Cheongwon-gun 960m section opened
- August 9, 1993: Gosan Bypass Road (Seobong-ri ~ Eumnae-ri, Gosan-myeon, Wanju-gun) 2.12 km section opened
- December 29, 1994: Total 4.811 km section from Gama-ri, Nami-myeon ~ Yangji-ri, Hyeondo-myeon, Cheongwon-gun opened and existing total 2.294 km section abolished
- July 1, 1996: Starting point changed from 'Dolsan-eup, Yeocheon-gun, Jeollanam-do' to 'Dolsan-eup, Yeosu-si, Jeollanam-do'.
- September 1, 1996: Jeonju ~ Bongdong Road (Ua-dong, Deokjin-gu, Jeonju-si ~ Janggi-ri, Bongdong-eup, Wanju-gun) section opened
- April 28, 1998: Dotong-dong ~ Gwangchi-dong, Namwon-si 6.86 km section opened
- December 16, 1998: Suncheon ~ Gurye Road (Apgok-ri, Seo-myeon ~ Yongnim-ri, Hwangjeon-myeon, Suncheon-si) 24.54 km section expansion opening
- December 30, 1998: Gwanghye-won-ri, Manseung-myeon, Jincheon-gun 1.91 km section opened, existing 1.6 km section abolished
- December 31, 1998: Jangseong-ri, Unju-myeon, Wanju-gun 2.029 km section opened
- December 23, 2000: Juksan-ri, Juksan-myeon, Anseong-si ~ Yangji-ri, Yangji-myeon, Yongin-si 23.17 km section expansion opening, existing 15.3 km section abolished
- January 15, 2001: Wolsan Intersection and Johwa Intersection 1.54 km section alignment improvement and grade separation opening, existing 1.4 km section abolished
- June 2001: Dolsan ~ Udu-ri Road (Udu-ri, Dolsan-eup, Yeosu-si) 120m section expansion opening and existing 150m section abolished
- September 29, 2001: Hyochon-ri, Namil-myeon, Cheongwon-gun ~ Hyuam-dong, Heungdeok-gu, Cheongju-si 11.4 km section designated as automobile-only road
- January 7, 2002: Gokseong Bypass Road (Oji-ri, Ogok-myeon ~ Jangseong-ri, Gokseong-eup, Gokseong-gun) 5.54 km section expansion opening, existing 4.46 km section abolished
- February 15, 2002: Deokchung Interchange, Deokchung-dong ~ Jusan Interchange, Jusan-dong, Yeosu-si 12.064 km section designated as automobile-only road
- December 30, 2002: Yullyang-dong, Sangdang-gu, Cheongju-si ~ Bokhyeon-ri, Ochang-myeon, Cheongwon-gun 9.97 km section expansion opening, existing section abolished
- December 20, 2003: Bokhyeon-ri, Ochang-myeon, Cheongwon-gun ~ Sagok-ri, Iwol-myeon, Jincheon-gun 16.47 km section expansion opening
- September 13, 2004: Jungheung ~ Wangji Road among Suncheon-si National Highway Alternative Bypass Roads (Seonwol-ri, Haeryong-myeon ~ Apgok-ri, Seo-myeon, Suncheon-si) 13.2 km section designated as automobile-only road
- February 28, 2005: Gongnam-ri, Boksu-myeon, Geumsan-gun 460m section improvement opening, existing 110m section abolished
- April 4, 2005: Automobile-only road designated section of Jungheung ~ Wangji Road among Suncheon-si National Highway Alternative Bypass Roads changed from "Seonwol-ri, Haeryong-myeon ~ Gagok-dong, Suncheon-si" to "Seonwol-ri, Haeryong-myeon ~ Apgok-ri, Seo-myeon, Suncheon-si" 10.0 km section
- November 21, 2005: Sangdong-ri, Jusaeng-myeon, Namwon-si 510m section designated as automobile-only road
- June 20, 2006: Deokyang-ri, Sora-myeon, Yeosu-si ~ Hodu-ri, Haeryong-myeon, Suncheon-si 15.14 km section designated as automobile-only road
- September 14, 2006: Chubu ~ Daejeon Road (Majeon-ri, Chubu-myeon, Geumsan-gun, Chungcheongnam-do ~ Samgoe-dong, Dong-gu, Daejeon Metropolitan City) 9.24 km section temporarily opened
- November 8, 2006: Sinji-ri, Yongjin-myeon ~ Jong-ri, Hwasan-myeon, Wanju-gun 10.65 km section opened
- December 26, 2006: Chubu ~ Daejeon Road (Majeon-ri, Chubu-myeon, Geumsan-gun, Chungcheongnam-do ~ Samgoe-dong, Dong-gu, Daejeon Metropolitan City) 9.24 km section expansion opening, existing Majeon-ri, Chubu-myeon, Geumsan-gun 1.7 km section abolished
- December 31, 2006: Jungsan-ri ~ Sinwol-ri, Iwol-myeon, Jincheon-gun 4.1 km section opened
- January 13, 2007: Jincheon ~ Dugyo-ri Road (Sinwol-ri ~ Naechon-ri, Iwol-myeon, Jincheon-gun) 1.18 km section opened
- January 19, 2007: Jungheung ~ Wangji Road among Suncheon-si National Highway Alternative Bypass Roads (Seonwol-ri, Haeryong-myeon ~ Apgok-ri, Seo-myeon, Suncheon-si) 10.9 km section expansion opening
- March 6, 2007: Due to Jungheung ~ Wangji Road opening, existing Hodu-ri ~ Dae-an-ri, Haeryong-myeon, Suncheon-si 6.427 km section abolished
- December 20, 2007: Cancellation of existing road abolition for Hodu-ri ~ Dae-an-ri, Haeryong-myeon, Suncheon-si 6.427 km section
- December 31, 2007: Sinjeong-dong, Namwon-si 500m section bypass road opened, Jungdong-ri ~ Sangdong-ri, Jusaeng-myeon, Namwon-si 900m section expansion opening
- January 12, 2009: Gokseong ~ Namwon Road (Jangseong-ri, Gokseong-eup, Gokseong-gun, Jeollanam-do ~ Jungdong-ri, Jusaeng-myeon, Namwon-si, Jeollabuk-do) 11.85 km section designated as automobile-only road
- October 1, 2010: Wangji Junction (Wangji-dong, Suncheon-si) Yeosu direction ramp opened
- May 12, 2011: Gangsangchon Junction, Suui-dong, Heungdeok-gu ~ Odong Intersection, Odong-dong, Sangdang-gu, Cheongju-si 13.33 km section designated as automobile-only road
- January 20, 2012: Yeosu ~ Suncheon Road (Deokyang-ri, Sora-myeon, Yeosu-si ~ Sindae-ri, Haeryong-myeon, Suncheon-si) 17.36 km section temporarily opened
- April 12, 2012: Yeosu ~ Suncheon Road and Udu ~ Jonghwa Road, Geobukseon Bridge (Udu-ri, Dolsan-eup, Yeosu-si ~ Sindae-ri, Haeryong-myeon, Suncheon-si) 38.8 km section expansion opening
- December 28, 2012: Jincheon ~ Dugyo-ri Road (Sinwol-ri, Iwol-myeon, Jincheon-gun, Chungcheongbuk-do ~ Dugyo-ri, Juksan-myeon, Anseong-si, Gyeonggi-do) 9.4 km section expansion opening, existing Nowon-ri, Iwol-myeon, Jincheon-gun, Chungcheongbuk-do ~ Dugyo-ri, Juksan-myeon, Anseong-si, Gyeonggi-do 11.0 km section abolished, Dugyo-ri, Juksan-myeon, Anseong-si 800m section expansion opening
- May 27, 2013: Due to Yeosu ~ Suncheon Road and Udu ~ Jonghwa Road, Geobukseon Bridge opening, existing Jusan-dong ~ Udu-ri, Dolsan-eup, Yeosu-si 14.8 km section and Deokyang-ri, Sora-myeon, Yeosu-si ~ Apgok-ri, Seo-myeon, Suncheon-si 23.6 km section abolished
- April 30, 2014: Automobile-only road section starting point of Gokseong ~ Namwon Road changed from Jangseong-ri, Gokseong-eup, Gokseong-gun, Jeollanam-do to Gwiseok-ri, Geumji-myeon, Namwon-si, Jeollabuk-do, reduced to 10.97 km
- December 23, 2014: Gokseong ~ Namwon Road (Jangseong-ri, Gokseong-eup, Gokseong-gun ~ Jungdong-ri, Jusaeng-myeon, Namwon-si) 12.29 km section expansion opening
- September 23, 2015: Dugyo-ri ~ Juksan Road (Dugyo-ri ~ Maesan-ri, Juksan-myeon, Anseong-si) 8.71 km section expansion opening, existing Jangwon-ri ~ Dugyo-ri, Juksan-myeon, Anseong-si 8.38 km section abolished
- September 30, 2015: Due to Namwon ~ Gokseong Road opening, existing national highway (Jangseong-ri, Gokseong-eup, Gokseong-gun ~ Jungdong-ri, Jusaeng-myeon, Namwon-si) 11.9 km section abolished
- January 25, 2016: Cheongju Station Intersection ~ Munam Park Intersection among Cheongju-si National Highway Alternative Bypass Roads (Suui-dong, Heungdeok-gu ~ Jeongsang-dong, Cheongwon-gu, Cheongju-si) 9.85 km section newly opened
- August 31, 2016: Munam Park Intersection ~ Odong Intersection among Cheongju-si National Highway Alternative Bypass Roads (Jeongsang-dong ~ Odong-dong, Cheongwon-gu, Cheongju-si) 3.31 km section newly opened and existing Yangchon-ri, Nami-myeon, Seowon-gu ~ Odong-dong, Cheongwon-gu, Cheongju-si 13.1 km section abolished
- December 20, 2016: Osu ~ Galma Road (Daemyeong-ri, Osu-myeon ~ Wolpyeong-ri, Seongsu-myeon, Imsil-gun) 7.79 km section expansion opening and existing Daemyeong-ri ~ O-am-ri, Osu-myeon, Imsil-gun 1.6 km section abolished
- November 20, 2017: Seungju Bypass Road (Guman-ri ~ Hakgu-ri, Seo-myeon, Suncheon-si) 1.16 km section expansion opening
- January 24, 2018: Osu ~ Wollak Road (Gwangchi-dong ~ Wolpyeong-ri, Samae-myeon, Namwon-si 6.18 km section and Geum-am-ri ~ Daemyeong-ri, Osu-myeon, Imsil-gun 2.52 km section) expansion opening, existing Daeyul-ri ~ Osin-ri, Samae-myeon, Namwon-si total 1.48 km section and Geum-am-ri, Osu-myeon, Imsil-gun 1.62 km section abolished
- September 5, 2018: Due to Yeosu ~ Suncheon Road opening, existing Seonwol-ri ~ Sindae-ri, Haeryong-myeon, Suncheon-si 3.68 km section abolished
- December 19, 2019: Dolsan ~ Udu Road (Sinbok-ri ~ Udu-ri, Dolsan-eup, Yeosu-si) 16.7 km section expansion opening, existing Jukpo-ri ~ Dunjeon-ri, Dolsan-eup, Yeosu-si 3.8 km section abolished
- February 5, 2020: Yongbok Tunnel (Gacheon-ri ~ Yongbok-ri, Gyeongcheon-myeon, Wanju-gun) 570m section improvement opening, existing 340m section abolished
- June 22, 2021: End point extended from Yangji-ri, Yangji-myeon, Cheoin-gu, Yongin-si, Gyeonggi-do to Chugok-ri, Docheok-myeon, Gwangju-si, Gyeonggi-do. Accordingly changed from 'Yeosu ~ Yongin Line' to 'Yeosu ~ Gwangju Line'.

== Main stopovers ==
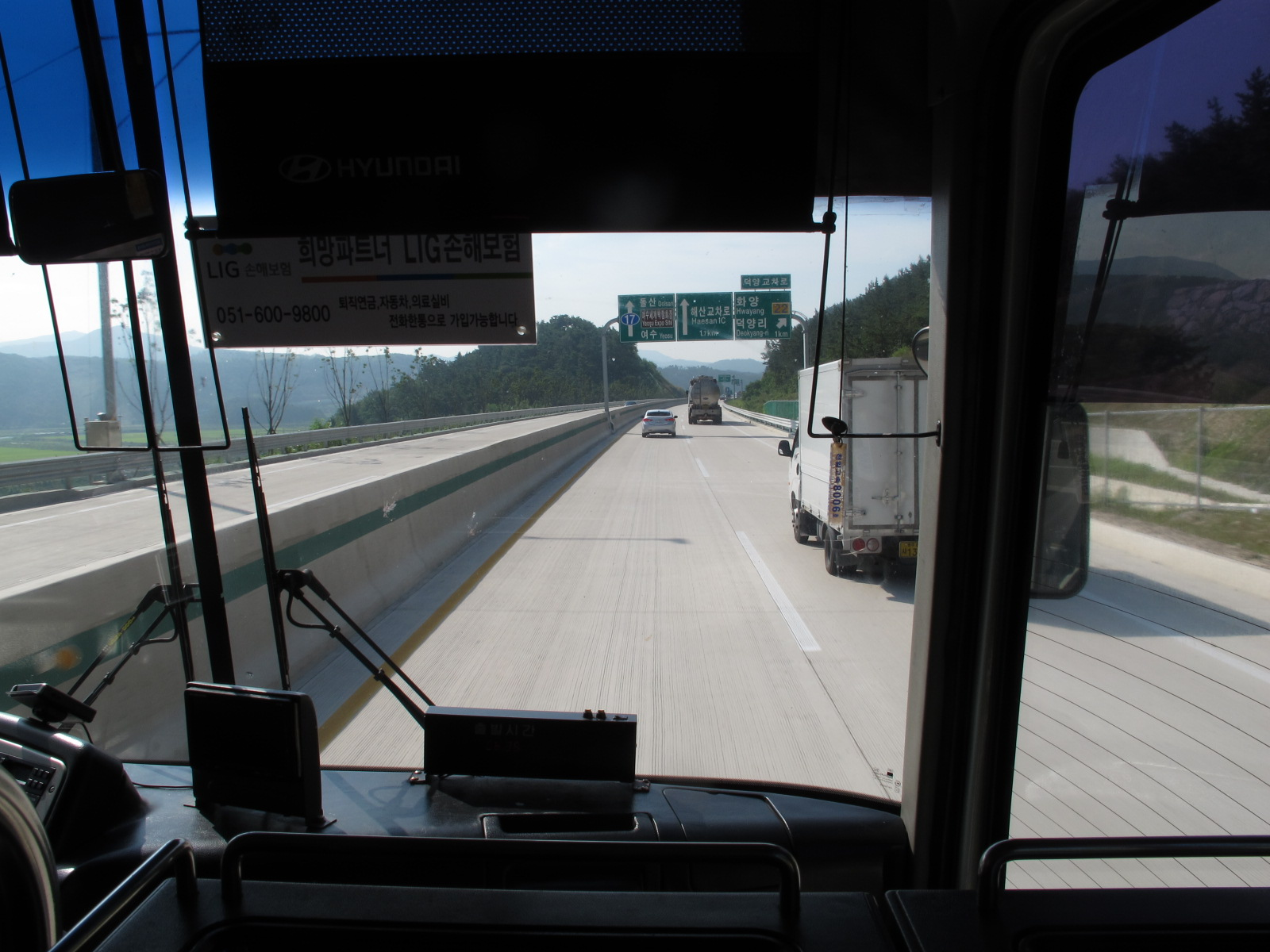
Deogyang IC in Expo-daero

South Jeolla Province

- Yeosu – Suncheon – Gurye County – Suncheon – Gokseong County

North Jeolla Province

- Namwon – Imsil County – Wanju County – Jeonju – Wonju County

South Chungcheong Province

- Geumsan County

Daejeon

- Dong District – Jung District – Dong District – Daedeok District

North Chungcheong Province

- Cheongju – Jincheon County

Gyeonggi Province

- Anseong – Yongin

== Major intersections ==
- (■): Motorway

IS: Intersection, IC: Interchange

=== South Jeolla Province ===
Name	Hangul name	Connection	Location		Note
Gunnae-ri	군내리		Yeosu City	Dolsan-eup	Terminus; National Route 77 overlap
Dolsan Elementary School Dolsan Middle School Yeosu Marine Science High School	돌산초등학교 돌산중학교 여수해양과학고등학교		Yeosu City	Dolsan-eup	National Route 77 overlap
Dongnae IS	동내삼거리	Mangwoldae-gil	Yeosu City	Dolsan-eup	National Route 77 overlap
Dolsan-eup Office	돌산읍사무소		Yeosu City	Dolsan-eup	National Route 77 overlap
Geumbong IS	금봉삼거리	Pyeongsa-ro	Yeosu City	Dolsan-eup	National Route 77 overlap
Deokgokjae	덕곡재		Yeosu City	Dolsan-eup	National Route 77 overlap
Jukpo IS	죽포삼거리	Hyangiram-ro	Yeosu City	Dolsan-eup	National Route 77 overlap
Jakgokjae IS	작곡재삼거리	Gyedong-ro	Yeosu City	Dolsan-eup	National Route 77 overlap
Dolsan Jungang Middle School	돌산중앙중학교		Yeosu City	Dolsan-eup	National Route 77 overlap
Dosil IS	도실삼거리	Pyeongsa-ro	Yeosu City	Dolsan-eup	National Route 77 overlap
Musulmok IS	무술목삼거리	Gyedong-ro	Yeosu City	Dolsan-eup	National Route 77 overlap
Admiral Lee Monument	이충무공전적비		Yeosu City	Dolsan-eup	National Route 77 overlap
No name	(이름 없음)	Gangnamhaean-ro	Yeosu City	Dolsan-eup	National Route 77 overlap
Seguji IS	세구지삼거리	Gangnam-ro	Yeosu City	Dolsan-eup	National Route 77 overlap
Dolsan IS	돌산 교차로	National Route 77 (Dolsan-ro)	Yeosu City	Dolsan-eup	National Route 77 overlap
Geobukseon Bridge	거북선대교		Yeosu City	Dolsan-eup	
Geobukseon Bridge			Yeosu City	Dongmun-dong	
Jasan Tunnel	자산터널		Yeosu City	Dongmun-dong	Approximately 443m
Jasan Tunnel			Yeosu City	Halnyeo-dong	Approximately 443m
Yeosu Station (Underpass)	여수역앞 (지하차도)	Dongmun-ro	Yeosu City	Halnyeo-dong	
Yeosu Expo	여수엑스포		Yeosu City	Mandeok-dong	
Mandeok IS	만덕사거리	Deokchungan-gil	Yeosu City	Mandeok-dong	
Yeosu Expo station	여수엑스포역		Yeosu City	Mandeok-dong	
Deokchung IC	덕충 나들목	Mangyang-ro	Yeosu City	Mandeok-dong	
Marae Tunnel	마래터널		Yeosu City	Mandeok-dong	Right tunnel: Approximately 1,397m Left tunnel: Approximately 1,351m
Manheung sanitary landfill	만흥위생매립장		Yeosu City	Mandeok-dong	
Manheung IC	만흥 나들목	Manseong-ro	Yeosu City	Mandeok-dong	
Dundeok IC (Dundeok 1 Tunnel)	둔덕 나들목 (둔덕1터널)	National Route 77 (Sangam-ro)	Yeosu City	Mipyeong-dong	Approximately 321m
Dundeok IC (Dundeok 1 Tunnel)		National Route 77 (Sangam-ro)	Yeosu City	Dundeok-dong	Approximately 321m
Expo Tunnel	엑스포터널		Yeosu City	Dundeok-dong	Approximately 2014m
Expo Tunnel			Yeosu City	Samil-dong	Approximately 2014m
Jusam IC	주삼 나들목	Yeosusandan-ro	Yeosu City	Samil-dong	
Gongdan IS	공단삼거리	Yeosusandan 2-ro	Yeosu City	Jusam-dong	
Yeosu IC	여수 나들목	Jwasuyeong-ro	Yeosu City	Jusam-dong	
Haesam IC	해산 나들목	Yeosusandan 1-ro	Yeosu City	Jusam-dong	
Sora Bridge	소라교		Yeosu City	Jusam-dong	
Sora Bridge			Yeosu City	Sora-myeon	
Deogyang IS	덕양 교차로	Prefectural Route 22 (Deogyang-ro)	Yeosu City	Sora-myeon	Prefectural Route 22 overlap
Daepo Bridge	대포교		Yeosu City	Sora-myeon	Prefectural Route 22 overlap
(2nd Industrial IC)	(제2산단 나들목)	Yeosun-ro	Yeosu City	Sora-myeon	Prefectural Route 22 overlap
Singi Bridge	신기교		Yeosu City	Sora-myeon	Prefectural Route 22 overlap
Daepo Tunnel	대포터널		Yeosu City	Sora-myeon	Prefectural Route 22 overlap Approximately 788m
Daepo Tunnel			Yeosu City	Yulchon-myeon	Prefectural Route 22 overlap Approximately 788m
Sangok Bridge	산곡교		Yeosu City	Yulchon-myeon	Prefectural Route 22 overlap
Sangok Tunnel	산곡터널		Yeosu City	Yulchon-myeon	Prefectural Route 22 overlap Approximately 580m
Chwijeok Bridge	취적교		Yeosu City	Yulchon-myeon	Prefectural Route 22 overlap
Chwijeok Tunnel	취적터널		Yeosu City	Yulchon-myeon	Prefectural Route 22 overlap Right tunnel: Approximately 490m Left tunnel: Approximately 475m
Yulchon IS	율촌 교차로	Seobu-ro	Yeosu City	Yulchon-myeon	Prefectural Route 22 overlap
Yulchon Tunnel	율촌터널		Yeosu City	Yulchon-myeon	Prefectural Route 22 overlap Right tunnel: Approximately 510m Left tunnel: Approximately 445m
Yulchon Tunnel			Suncheon City	Haeryong-myeon	Prefectural Route 22 overlap Right tunnel: Approximately 510m Left tunnel: Approximately 445m
Dorong IS (Dorong IC)	도롱 교차로 (도롱 나들목)	Namhae Expressway	Suncheon City	Haeryong-myeon	Prefectural Route 22 overlap
Haeryong 2 Tunnel	해룡2터널		Suncheon City	Haeryong-myeon	Prefectural Route 22 overlap Right tunnel: Approximately 620m Left tunnel: Approximately 630m
Haeryong IS (Haeryong IC)	해룡 교차로 (해룡 나들목)	Namhae Expressway; Yeosun-ro	Suncheon City	Haeryong-myeon	Prefectural Route 22 overlap
Maean IS	매안 교차로	Prefectural Route 863 (Haegwang-ro)	Suncheon City	Haeryong-myeon	Prefectural Route 22 overlap
Sindae IS	신대 교차로	Woljeon ~ Sepung Motorway; Mupyeong-ro	Suncheon City	Haeryong-myeon	Prefectural Route 22 overlap
East Suncheon IC	동순천 나들목	Suncheon–Wanju Expressway	Suncheon City	Haeryong-myeon	Prefectural Route 22 overlap
Sangbi IS	상비 교차로	National Route 2 Prefectural Route 22 (Sungwang-ro)	Suncheon City	Wangjo-dong	Prefectural Route 22 overlap
Wangji IC (Suncheon IC)	왕지 분기점 (순천 나들목)	Namhae Expressway; Baekgang-ro	Suncheon City	Wangjo-dong	
Wangji IC (Suncheon IC)		Namhae Expressway; Baekgang-ro	Suncheon City	Seo-myeon	
Gongdan IS	공단사거리	Prefectural Route 840 (Maecheon-ro); Sandan 1-gil	Suncheon City	Seo-myeon	Prefectural Route 840 overlap
Jibon IS	지본삼거리	Prefectural Route 840 (Cheongso-gil)	Suncheon City	Seo-myeon	Prefectural Route 840 overlap
Seonpyeong IS	선평삼거리	National Route 22 (Jungang-ro)	Suncheon City	Seo-myeon	National Route 22 overlap
Dongsan Elementary School	동산초등학교		Suncheon City	Seo-myeon	National Route 22 overlap
Seo-myeon Office	서면사무소입구	Imchondong-gil; Jukpyeong-gil	Suncheon City	Seo-myeon	National Route 22 overlap
Suncheon Electronic High School	순천전자고등학교		Suncheon City	Seo-myeon	National Route 22 overlap
West Suncheon IC	서순천 나들목	Namhae Expressway; Honam Expressway	Suncheon City	Seo-myeon	National Route 22 overlap
Dongsan IS	동산삼거리	Dongsan-gil	Suncheon City	Seo-myeon	National Route 22 overlap
Hakgu IS	학구삼거리	National Route 22 (Seungju-ro)	Suncheon City	Seo-myeon	National Route 22 overlap
Songchi Tunnel	송치터널		Suncheon City	Seo-myeon	Approximately 780m
Songchi Tunnel			Suncheon City	Woldeung-myeon	Approximately 780m
Seungju Bridge	승주교		Suncheon City	Woldeung-myeon	
Mangryong IS	망룡삼거리		Suncheon City	Hwangjeon-myeon	
Goemok Station IS (Goemok Station)	괴목역삼거리 (괴목역)	Prefectural Route 840 (Geonguchildong-ro)	Suncheon City	Hwangjeon-myeon	Prefectural Route 840 overlap
Goemok IS	괴목사거리	Prefectural Route 840; Prefectural Route 857 (Boksagol-gil)	Suncheon City	Hwangjeon-myeon	Prefectural Route 840 overlap
Yongdu IS	용두삼거리	Seomjingang-ro; Yongseo-gil	Suncheon City	Hwangjeon-myeon	Indirect connected with Hwangjeon IC
Hwangjeon Railway Overpass	황전철도육교		Suncheon City	Hwangjeon-myeon	
Gurye 1 Bridge	구례1교		Gurye County	Muncheok-myeon	
Gurye 1 Bridge			Gurye County	Gurye-eup	
Muncheok IS	문척 교차로	Prefectural Route 861 (Sudalsaengtae-ro)	Gurye County	Gurye-eup	
Seosi 1 Bridge	서시1교		Gurye County	Gurye-eup	
Seosi 1 Bridge			Gurye County	Masan-myeon	
Naengcheon IS	냉천 나들목	National Route 18; National Route 19 (Seomjingang-daero) (Saneom-ro)	Gurye County	Masan-myeon	National Route 18 overlap
Seosi Bridge	서시교		Gurye County	Masan-myeon	National Route 18 overlap
Seosi Bridge			Gurye County	Gurye-eup	National Route 18 overlap
Seosi Bridge (southbound)	서시교 남단	Seosicheon-ro	Gurye County	Gurye-eup	National Route 18 overlap
Gurye Social Welfare Center	구례종합사회복지관		Gurye County	Gurye-eup	National Route 18 overlap
Gurye Public Bus Terminal	구례공영버스터미널	Jungang-ro	Gurye County	Gurye-eup	National Route 18 overlap
(Unnamed rotary)	(로터리 이름 없음)	Prefectural Route 861 (Sudalsaengtae-ro) (Bongseong-ro)	Gurye County	Gurye-eup	National Route 18 overlap
Gurye County Office Gurye Middle School Jeonnam Natural Science High School	구례군청 구례중학교 전남자연과학고등학교		Gurye County	Gurye-eup	National Route 18 overlap
Checkpoint Entrance IS	검문소입구 교차로	Seomjingang-ro; Sinchon-gil	Gurye County	Gurye-eup	National Route 18 overlap
Gurye Bridge	구례교		Gurye County	Gurye-eup	National Route 18 overlap
Gurye Bridge			Suncheon City	Hwangjeon-myeon	National Route 18 overlap
Guryegu Station (Seonbyeon IS)	구례구역 (선변삼거리)	Seomjingang-ro	Suncheon City	Hwangjeon-myeon	National Route 18 overlap
Bokhoje 1 Bridge	복호제1교		Suncheon City	Hwangjeon-myeon	National Route 18 overlap
Apnok Bridge	압록교		Gokseong County	Jukgok-myeon	National Route 18 overlap
Apnok Bridge			Gokseong County	Ogok-myeon	National Route 18 overlap
Apnok IS	압록사거리	National Route 18 (Daehwanggang-ro)	Gokseong County	Ogok-myeon	National Route 18 overlap
Apnok Station	압록역		Gokseong County	Ogok-myeon	
Ijeong Bridge	이정교		Gokseong County	Ogok-myeon	
Chimgok Station	침곡역		Gokseong County	Ogok-myeon	
Oji IS	오지 교차로	Gichamaeul-ro	Gokseong County	Ogok-myeon	
Daepyeong 1 Bridge	대평1교		Gokseong County	Ogok-myeon	
Daepyeong 1 Bridge			Gokseong County	Gokseong-eup	
Eupnae IS	읍내 교차로	Prefectural Route 60 (Gokgo-ro)	Gokseong County	Gokseong-eup	
Singi IS	신기 교차로	Prefectural Route 840 (Nakdongwon-ro)	Gokseong County	Gokseong-eup	Prefectural Route 840 overlap
Jangseon IS	장선 교차로	Prefectural Route 840 (Cheonggyedong-ro)	Gokseong County	Gokseong-eup	Prefectural Route 840 overlap
Geumgok Bridge	금곡교		Gokseong County	Gokseong-eup	Continuation into North Jeolla Province

- Motorway sections
  - Yeosu Expo Tunnel ~ Jusam IC (Expo-daero)
  - Yeosu Deogyang IS ~ Suncheon Sindae IS (Expo-daero)

=== North Jeolla Province ===
Name	Hangul name	Connection	Location		Note
Geumgok Bridge	금곡교		Namwon City	Geumji-myeon	South Jeolla Province – North Jeolla Province border line
Geumji IS	금지 교차로	Prefectural Route 730 (Nosong-ro)	Namwon City	Geumji-myeon	
Yocheon 2 Bridge	요천2교		Namwon City	Geumji-myeon	
Yocheon 2 Bridge			Namwon City	Songdong-myeon	
Yangpyeong IS	양평 교차로	Mulmeori-ro	Namwon City	Songdong-myeon	
Sinpyeong IS	신평 교차로	Yongtusan-ro	Namwon City	Songdong-myeon	
Songdong IS	송동 교차로	Jusong-gil	Namwon City	Songdong-myeon	Indirect connected with West Namwon IC; Indirect connected with Prefectural Route 745
Yocheon Bridge	요천교		Namwon City	Songdong-myeon	
Yocheon Bridge			Namwon City	Jusaeng-myeon	
Josan IS (Josan Underpass)	조산 교차로 (조산지하차도)	Yocheon-ro	Namwon City	Jusaeng-myeon	
Sinjeong IS	신정 교차로	National Route 24 (Nammun-ro)	Namwon City	Wangjeong-dong	
Namwon Station IS	남원역 교차로	Buknamwon-ro	Namwon City	Wangjeong-dong	
Sangok Tunnel	산곡터널		Namwon City	Wangjeong-dong	Approximately 580m
Sangok Tunnel			Namwon City	Hyanggyo-dong	Approximately 580m
Sanseong IS	산성 교차로	Sanseong-gil	Namwon City	Hyanggyo-dong	
Hyangdan IS	향단 교차로	Chunhyang-ro	Namwon City	Hyanggyo-dong	
Bangja IS	방자 교차로	Saneom-ro	Namwon City	Hyanggyo-dong	
Yulchi IS	율치 교차로	Chunhyang-ro	Namwon City	Hyanggyo-dong	
Chunhyang Tunnel	춘향터널		Namwon City	Hyanggyo-dong	Approximately 480m
Chunhyang Tunnel			Namwon City	Samae-myeon	Approximately 480m
Samae IS	사매 교차로	Deoko-ro	Namwon City	Samae-myeon	
Wolpyeong Bridge	월평교	Daesa-ro	Namwon City	Samae-myeon	
Yulcheon Bridge	율천교		Imsil County	Osu-myeon	
Daejeong IS	대정 교차로	Daejeong-gil	Imsil County	Osu-myeon	
Osu IS	오수 교차로	Deoko-ro; Osu-ro; Yongjeong-gil	Imsil County	Osu-myeon	
Namak IS	남악 교차로	National Route 13 (Chunghyo-ro)	Imsil County	Osu-myeon	
Osu IC (Osu IC IS)	오수 나들목 (오수IC 교차로)	Suncheon–Wanju Expressway	Imsil County	Osu-myeon	
Gukpyeong IS	국평삼거리	Osu-ro	Imsil County	Osu-myeon	
Bongcheon Station	봉천역		Imsil County	Osu-myeon	
Wolpyeong IS (Wolpyeong IS)	월평삼거리 (월평 교차로)	National Route 30 (Imjil-ro)	Imsil County	Seongsu-myeon	National Route 30 overlap
Imsil IC (Imsil IS)	임실 나들목 (임실 교차로)	Suncheon–Wanju Expressway; National Route 30 (Hoguk-ro)	Imsil County	Imsil-eup	National Route 30 overlap
Dugok IS	두곡삼거리	Bonghwang-ro	Imsil County	Imsil-eup	
Imsil Station	임실역		Imsil County	Imsil-eup	
Yongeun Bridge	용은교		Imsil County	Imsil-eup	
Yongeun Bridge			Imsil County	Gwanchon-myeon	
Yewon Arts University IS	예원대사거리	Changin-ro; Yongsan 1-gil	Imsil County	Gwanchon-myeon	
Byeongam Underpass IS (Gwanchon Station)	병암지하차도 교차로 (관촌역)	Prefectural Route 49 (Sindeokpyeong-ro)	Imsil County	Gwanchon-myeon	Prefectural Route 49 overlap
Byeongam IS (Byeongam IS)	병암삼거리 (병암 교차로)	Prefectural Route 49 (Gwanjin-ro)	Imsil County	Gwanchon-myeon	Prefectural Route 49 overlap
Owon Bridge	오원교		Imsil County	Gwanchon-myeon	
Gwanchon IS	관촌 교차로	Prefectural Route 745 (Gwanma-ro)	Imsil County	Gwanchon-myeon	Prefectural Route 745 overlap
Gwanchon IS	관촌삼거리	Saseon-ro; Saseon 1-gil	Imsil County	Gwanchon-myeon	Prefectural Route 745 overlap
Seulchima-eul	슬치마을	Prefectural Route 745 (Seokdongseulchi-ro)	Imsil County	Gwanchon-myeon	Prefectural Route 745 overlap
Myeongdeok Bridge	명덕교		Wanju County	Sanggwan-myeon	
Sanggwan IC	상관 나들목	Suncheon–Wanju Expressway	Wanju County	Sanggwan-myeon	
Sinri IS	신리삼거리	Prefectural Route 749 (Silli-ro)	Wanju County	Sanggwan-myeon	Prefectural Route 749 overlap
Sinri Bridge	신리교		Wanju County	Sanggwan-myeon	Prefectural Route 749 overlap
Sinri IS	신리 교차로	Prefectural Route 749 (Waemok-ro)	Wanju County	Sanggwan-myeon	Prefectural Route 749 overlap
Sanggwan IS	상관 교차로	National Route 21 (Honam-ro)	Wanju County	Sanggwan-myeon	National Route 21 overlap
Wolam 2 Bridge	월암2교		Wanju County	Sanggwan-myeon	National Route 21 overlap
No name	(이름 없음)	Silli-ro	Jeonju City	Wansan District	National Route 21 overlap
No name	(이름 없음)	Chunhyang-ro	Jeonju City	Wansan District	National Route 21 overlap
Anjeok Bridge	안적교		Jeonju City	Wansan District	National Route 21 overlap
Ajung Station Square (Ajung Station)	아중역광장 (아중역)	Ajung-ro	Jeonju City	Deokjin District	National Route 21 overlap
Ua IS (Andeokwon Underpass)	우아네거리 (안덕원지하차도)	National Route 26 (Jeonjin-ro)	Jeonju City	Deokjin District	National Route 21, National Route 26 overlap
Station Square (Jeonju Station)	역전광장 (전주역)	Baekje-daero	Jeonju City	Deokjin District	National Route 21, National Route 26 overlap
Hoseong IS	호성네거리	Gyeonhwon-ro; Chopodari-ro	Jeonju City	Deokjin District	National Route 21, National Route 26 overlap
Hosung-dong Community Center	호성동주민센터		Jeonju City	Deokjin District	National Route 21, National Route 26 overlap
Vehicle Registration Office	차량등록사업소앞	National Route 21; National Route 26 (Dongbu-daero)	Jeonju City	Deokjin District	National Route 21, National Route 26 overlap
Dongsangwa Bridge	동산과교		Jeonju City	Deokjin District	
Godang IS	고당네거리	Chopo-ro; Sageori-gil	Jeonju City	Deokjin District	
Je2soyang Bridge	제2소양교		Jeonju City	Deokjin District	
Je2soyang Bridge			Wanju County	Yongjin-eup	
Yongjin IS	용진삼거리	Chopodari-ro	Wanju County	Yongjin-eup	
Yongjin-eup Office Sangun Bridge	용진읍사무소 상운교		Wanju County	Yongjin-eup	
Wanju IC (Wanju IS)	완주 나들목 (완주 교차로)	Iksan-Pohang Expressway	Wanju County	Yongjin-eup	
Byuksung College Wanju Campus (Closed)	벽성대학 완주캠퍼스 (폐교)		Wanju County	Yongjin-eup	
No name	(이름 없음)	Jiam-ro	Wanju County	Yongjin-eup	
Yongbong Elementary School	용봉초등학교		Wanju County	Yongjin-eup	
Bongdong IS	봉동삼거리	Bongdongjungang-ro	Wanju County	Yongjin-eup	
Wanju National Sports Center	완주국민체육센터		Wanju County	Yongjin-eup	
Yongjin IS	용진 교차로	Gosancheon-ro; Sambong-ro	Wanju County	Yongjin-eup	
Apdaesan Tunnel	앞대산터널		Wanju County	Yongjin-eup	Approximately 171m
Apdaesan Tunnel			Wanju County	Gosan-myeon	Approximately 171m
Yanghwa IS	양화 교차로	Yanghwa-ro	Wanju County	Gosan-myeon	
Nambong IS	남봉 교차로	Nambong-ro	Wanju County	Gosan-myeon	
Gosan Bridge	고산교		Wanju County	Gosan-myeon	
Gosan IS	고산 교차로	Nungireogi-ro	Wanju County	Gosan-myeon	
Samgi Bridge	삼기교		Wanju County	Gosan-myeon	
Samgi IS	삼기 교차로	Gosancheon-ro	Wanju County	Gosan-myeon	Indirect connected with Prefectural Route 732
Yongso Bridge	용소교		Wanju County	Hwasan-myeon	
No name	(이름 없음)	Gosancheon-ro	Wanju County	Hwasan-myeon	Indirect connected with Prefectural Route 643
No name	(이름 없음)	Gosancheon-ro	Wanju County	Hwasan-myeon	
Gyeongcheon Bridge	경천교		Wanju County	Gyeongcheon-myeon	
Gyeongcheon-myeon Office	경천면사무소		Wanju County	Gyeongcheon-myeon	
No name	(이름 없음)	Prefectural Route 740 (Gyeonggacheon-gil)	Wanju County	Gyeongcheon-myeon	Prefectural Route 740 overlap
No name	(이름 없음)	Prefectural Route 740 (Hwasan-ro)	Wanju County	Gyeongcheon-myeon	Prefectural Route 740 overlap
Yongbok Bridge	용복교		Wanju County	Gyeongcheon-myeon	
Malgoljae	말골재		Wanju County	Unju-myeon	
Unju Bypass Road IS	운주우회도로 교차로	Jangseon-ro	Wanju County	Unju-myeon	
Jangseon Bridge	장선교		Wanju County	Unju-myeon	
Jangseon IS	장선삼거리	Prefectural Route 697 (Unju-ro)	Wanju County	Unju-myeon	
Korea Game Science High School	한국게임과학고등학교		Wanju County	Unju-myeon	
Sanbuk-ri	산북리	Prefectural Route 740 (Sutgogae-gil)	Wanju County	Unju-myeon	
Daedunsan IS	대둔산삼거리	Daedunsangongwon-gil	Wanju County	Unju-myeon	
Baetijae	배티재		Wanju County	Unju-myeon	Elevation 349m Continuation into South Chungcheong Province

- Motorway section
  - Namwon Geumji IS ~ Bangja IS (Seobu-ro)

=== South Chungcheong Province ===
Name	Hangul name	Connection	Location		Note
Baetijae	배티재		Geumsan County	Jinsan-myeon	Elevation 349m North Jeolla Province – South Chungcheong Province border line
Jinsan IS	진산삼거리	Prefectural Route 68 (Taegosa-ro)	Geumsan County	Jinsan-myeon	Prefectural Route 68 overlap
Eupnae IS	읍내삼거리	Eupnae-ro	Geumsan County	Jinsan-myeon	Prefectural Route 68 overlap
No name	(이름 없음)	Eupnae-ro	Geumsan County	Jinsan-myeon	Prefectural Route 68 overlap
Jinsan Middle School	진산중학교		Geumsan County	Jinsan-myeon	Prefectural Route 68 overlap
Eupnae-ri IS	읍내리 교차로	Dangdi-ro	Geumsan County	Jinsan-myeon	Prefectural Route 68 overlap
Bangchuk IS	방축삼거리	Prefectural Route 68 (Jinsan-ro)	Geumsan County	Jinsan-myeon	Prefectural Route 68 overlap
Boksu Bridge	복수교		Geumsan County	Jinsan-myeon	
Boksu Bridge			Geumsan County	Boksu-myeon	
Goknam IS	곡남삼거리	Prefectural Route 635 (Baenaemi-ro)	Geumsan County	Boksu-myeon	Prefectural Route 635 overlap
Boksu IS	복수삼거리	Prefectural Route 635 (Boksu-ro)	Geumsan County	Boksu-myeon	Prefectural Route 635 overlap
Wonyongjin IS	원용진사거리	Yongcheon-ro	Geumsan County	Boksu-myeon	
Yongji IS	용지삼거리	Motgol-ro	Geumsan County	Chubu-myeon	
Majeon IS	마전사거리	Daehak-ro; Samyuk-ro	Geumsan County	Chubu-myeon	
Yangcheong IS	양청사거리	Majeon-ro; Seodaesan-ro	Geumsan County	Chubu-myeon	
Majeon IS	마전 교차로	National Route 37 (Geumsan-ro)	Geumsan County	Chubu-myeon	National Route 37 overlap
Chubu IC	추부 나들목	Tongyeong–Daejeon Expressway	Geumsan County	Chubu-myeon	National Route 37 overlap
Maeum IS	마음 교차로	Seodaesan-ro; Chupung-ro	Geumsan County	Chubu-myeon	National Route 37 overlap
Yogwang IS	요광 교차로	National Route 37 (Seodaesan-ro)	Geumsan County	Chubu-myeon	National Route 37 overlap
Geumsan Tunnel	금산터널		Geumsan County	Chubu-myeon	Right tunnel: Approximately 1470m Left tunnel: Approximately 1450m Continuation into Daejeon

=== Daejeon ===
Name	Hangul name	Connection	Location		Note
Geumsan Tunnel	금산터널		Daejeon	Dong District	Right tunnel: Approximately 1470m Left tunnel: Approximately 1450m South Chungcheong Province – Daejeon border line
Meodeulryeong Tunnel	머들령터널		Daejeon	Dong District	Approximately 200m
Samgoe 2 Bridge	삼괴2교		Daejeon	Dong District	
Wolgye IS	월계 교차로	Sannae-ro	Daejeon	Dong District	
Samgoe 1 Bridge	삼괴1교		Daejeon	Dong District	
South Daejeon IC	남대전 나들목	Tongyeong–Daejeon Expressway	Daejeon	Dong District	
Nangwoldari	낭월다리		Daejeon	Dong District	
Daebyeol IS	대별삼거리	Sannae-ro	Daejeon	Dong District	
Daeseongdong IS	대성동삼거리	Daejeon-ro	Daejeon	Dong District	
Okgye Bridge	옥계교		Daejeon	Dong District	
Okgye Bridge			Daejeon	Jung District	
No name	(이름 없음)	Euneosong-ro	Daejeon	Jung District	
Daejeon Seokgyo Elementary School	대전석교초등학교		Daejeon	Jung District	
Doldari IS	돌다리네거리	Daejong-ro; Doldari-ro	Daejeon	Jung District	
Cheonseok Bridge	천석교		Daejeon	Jung District	
Cheonseok Bridge			Daejeon	Dong District	
No name	(이름 없음)	Daejeon-ro	Daejeon	Dong District	
Hyodong IS	효동네거리	Gyejok-ro; Bomun-ro	Daejeon	Dong District	
Indong IS	인동네거리	National Route 4 (Chungmu-ro)	Daejeon	Dong District	
Wondong IS	원동네거리	Daeheung-ro; Dongdaejeon-ro	Daejeon	Dong District	
Jungang Market IS	중앙시장삼거리	Junggyo-ro	Daejeon	Dong District	
Daejeon Station (Daejeon Station IS)	대전역 (대전역네거리)	Jungang-ro	Daejeon	Dong District	
Daejeon Samsung Elementary School	대전삼성초등학교		Daejeon	Dong District	
Samsung IS	삼성네거리	Uam-ro	Daejeon	Dong District	
Samsung Bridge	삼성교		Daejeon	Dong District	
No name	(이름 미상)	Seongnam-ro	Daejeon	Dong District	Under construction
Hongdo Overpass IS	홍도육교오거리	Dongseo-daero; Hyeonam-ro	Daejeon	Dong District	
Hongdo 3 Crossing	홍도3 건널목		Daejeon	Dong District	
Hongdo 3 Crossing			Daejeon	Daedeok District	
Hannam IS	한남오거리	Ojeong-ro; Hannam-ro	Daejeon	Daedeok District	
Ojeong IS	오정네거리	Hanbat-daero	Daejeon	Daedeok District	
Daehwa Industrial Complex IS	대화공단삼거리	Daehwa-ro	Daejeon	Daedeok District	
Eupnae IS	읍내네거리	Arirang-ro	Daejeon	Daedeok District	
Hoedeok Elementary School	회덕초등학교		Daejeon	Daedeok District	
Hoedeok-dong Community Center	회덕동주민센터		Daejeon	Daedeok District	
Eupnae IS (CJ Korea Express Daejeon Cargo Terminal)	읍내삼거리 (대한통운 대전화물터미널)	Gyejok-ro	Daejeon	Daedeok District	
Sindaegwadogyo	신대과도교		Daejeon	Daedeok District	
Wadong Elementary School Korea Water Resources Corporation	와동초등학교 한국수자원공사		Daejeon	Daedeok District	
Hoedeok station	회덕역		Daejeon	Daedeok District	
Deokjigoga	덕지고가		Daejeon	Daedeok District	
Wadong IC (Wadong Overpass)	와동 나들목 (와동육교)	Riverside Urban Expressway	Daejeon	Daedeok District	
Sangseo IS	상서삼거리	Saneopdanji-ro	Daejeon	Daedeok District	
Sintanjin IC	신탄진 나들목	Gyeongbu Expressway	Daejeon	Daedeok District	Connect to Sintanjin via Route 681
Sintanjin Railway Bridge	신탄진과선교		Daejeon	Daedeok District	
No name (KT&G)	(이름 없음) (KT&G)	Deogambuk-ro; Beotkkot-gil	Daejeon	Daedeok District	
Seokbonggureumdari	석봉구름다리 동단	Sintanjindong-ro	Daejeon	Daedeok District	
Sintanjin station	신탄진역		Daejeon	Daedeok District	
Sintanjin IS	신탄진네거리	Prefectural Route 32 (Daedeok-daero) (Daecheong-ro)	Daejeon	Daedeok District	
Hyeondo Bridge	현도교		Daejeon	Daedeok District	Continuation into North Chungcheong Province

=== North Chungcheong Province ===
Name	Hangul name	Connection	Location		Note
Hyeondo Bridge	현도교		Cheongju City	Seowon District Hyeondo-myeon	Daejeon – North Chungcheong Province border line
Maebong IS	매봉삼거리	Prefectural Route 591 (Dalgyenosan-ro)	Cheongju City	Seowon District Hyeondo-myeon	Prefectural Route 591 overlap
Hyeondo Elementary School Hyeondo Middle School	현도초등학교 현도중학교		Cheongju City	Seowon District Hyeondo-myeon	Prefectural Route 591 overlap
Seondong IS	선동삼거리	Prefectural Route 591 (Simokbugang-ro)	Cheongju City	Seowon District Hyeondo-myeon	Prefectural Route 591 overlap
Hyeondo-myeon Office	현도면사무소		Cheongju City	Seowon District Hyeondo-myeon	
No name	(이름 없음)	Hyeondogongdan-ro	Cheongju City	Seowon District Hyeondo-myeon	
Urok Bridge Oecheontae Bridge	우록교 외천태교		Cheongju City	Seowon District Hyeondo-myeon	
Oecheon IS	외천삼거리	Prefectural Route 96 (Yeoncheong-ro)	Cheongju City	Seowon District Nami-myeon	Prefectural Route 96 overlap Connected with South Cheongju IC
Namioecheon IS	남이외천삼거리	Namseok-ro	Cheongju City	Seowon District Nami-myeon	Prefectural Route 96 overlap
Cheoksan IS	척산삼거리	Cheoksanhoedang-ro	Cheongju City	Seowon District Nami-myeon	Prefectural Route 96 overlap
Daeryeon IS	대련삼거리	Daerim-ro	Cheongju City	Seowon District Nami-myeon	Prefectural Route 96 overlap
Gajwa IS	가좌삼거리	Gajwasinsong-ro	Cheongju City	Seowon District Nami-myeon	Prefectural Route 96 overlap
Yangchon IS	양촌 분기점	3sunhwan-ro	Cheongju City	Seowon District Nami-myeon	Prefectural Route 96 overlap
Gama IS	가마 교차로	2sunhwan-ro	Cheongju City	Seowon District Nami-myeon	Prefectural Route 96 overlap
e-mart Cheongju	이마트 청주점		Cheongju City	Seowon District	Prefectural Route 96 overlap
Mipyeong IS	미평사거리	Gungtteul-ro; Cheongnam-ro 1887beon-gil	Cheongju City	Seowon District	Prefectural Route 96 overlap
Chamsarang Hospital Chungcheongbuk-do Office of Education	참사랑병원 충청북도교육청		Cheongju City	Seowon District	Prefectural Route 96 overlap
Bunpyeong IS	분평사거리	1sunhwan-ro	Cheongju City	Seowon District	Prefectural Route 96 overlap
Namseong Elementary School Chungbuk High School Namseong Middle School	남성초등학교 충북고등학교 남성중학교		Cheongju City	Seowon District	Prefectural Route 96 overlap
No name	(이름 없음)	Wolpyeong-ro; Cheongnam-ro 2005beon-gil	Cheongju City	Seowon District	Prefectural Route 96 overlap
Cheongju Nam Middle School	청주남중학교		Cheongju City	Seowon District	Prefectural Route 96 overlap
Namjung IS	남중삼거리	Suyeong-ro	Cheongju City	Seowon District	Prefectural Route 96 overlap
Cheongju National University of Education Affiliated Elementary School of Cheongju National University of Education	청주교육대학교 청주교대부설초등학교		Cheongju City	Seowon District	Prefectural Route 96 overlap
No name	(이름 없음)	Guryongsan-ro	Cheongju City	Seowon District	Prefectural Route 96 overlap
Mochung IS	모충사거리	Musimseo-ro	Cheongju City	Seowon District	Prefectural Route 96 overlap
Cheongnam Bridge	청남교		Cheongju City	Seowon District	Prefectural Route 96 overlap
Cheongnam Bridge			Cheongju City	Sangdang District	Prefectural Route 96 overlap
Cheongnam Bridge IS	청남교사거리	Musimdong-ro	Cheongju City	Sangdang District	Prefectural Route 96 overlap
Seokgyo IS	석교육거리	National Route 25 (Danjae-ro); Yeongun-ro; Sangdang-ro 1beon-gil Sangdang-ro 3beon-gil Sangdang-ro 5beon-gil	Cheongju City	Sangdang District	Prefectural Route 96 overlap
Gunamgong Hospital IS	구남궁병원사거리	Namsa-ro; Yongdam-ro	Cheongju City	Sangdang District	Prefectural Route 96 overlap
Docheon IS (Chungcheongbuk-do Office)	도청사거리 (충청북도청)	Sangdang-ro 69beon-gil Sangdang-ro 70beon-gil	Cheongju City	Sangdang District	Prefectural Route 96 overlap
Sangdang IS (Sangdang Park)	상당사거리 (상당공원)	National Route 36; Prefectural Route 96 (Sajik-daero); Gyodong-ro	Cheongju City	Sangdang District	National Route 36 overlap Prefectural Route 96 overlap
Cheongju City Hall	청주시청		Cheongju City	Sangdang District	National Route 36 overlap
Bangadari IS	방아다리사거리	Sabuk-ro; Sangdang-ro 186beon-gil	Cheongju City	Sangdang District	National Route 36 overlap
Uam IS	우암오거리	Hyanggun-ro; Jungang-ro 103beon-gil Sangdang-ro 204beon-gil	Cheongju City	Cheongwon District	National Route 36 overlap
Uam Elementary School	우암초등학교		Cheongju City	Cheongwon District	National Route 36 overlap
Cheongdae IS (Cheongju University)	청대사거리 (청주대학교)	Jikji-daero; Daeseong-ro	Cheongju City	Cheongwon District	National Route 36 overlap
Naedeok IS	내덕삼거리	Saeteo-ro	Cheongju City	Cheongwon District	National Route 36 overlap
Naedeok IS	내덕칠거리	National Route 36 (Chungcheong-daero); Naedeok-ro; Andeokbeol-ro; Uam-ro; Chungcheong-daero 1beon-gil	Cheongju City	Cheongwon District	National Route 36 overlap
No name	(이름 없음)	1sunhwan-ro	Cheongju City	Cheongwon District	
Sacheon Bridge	사천교		Cheongju City	Cheongwon District	
Sacheon Bridge IS	사천교사거리	Yulcheonbuk-ro	Cheongju City	Cheongwon District	
Deokseong Elementary School	덕성초등학교		Cheongju City	Cheongwon District	
Nonghyeop IS	농협사거리	Yulbong-ro	Cheongju City	Cheongwon District	
Saint Mary's Hospital IS	성모병원삼거리	Juseong-ro	Cheongju City	Cheongwon District	
Yullyang IS	율량 교차로	2sunhwan-ro	Cheongju City	Cheongwon District	
Chungcheongbuk-do Student Education Center	충청북도 학생교육문화원	Gonghang-ro 287beon-gil	Cheongju City	Cheongwon District	
Jongchukjang IS	종축장삼거리	Palgyeol-ro	Cheongju City	Cheongwon District	
Odong IS	오동 교차로	3sunhwan-ro	Cheongju City	Cheongwon District	
Ogeunjang Overpass	오근장육교		Cheongju City	Cheongwon District	
(Gonghang IS)	(공항 교차로)	Prefectural Route 540 (Ochang-daero)	Cheongju City	Cheongwon District	
Palgyeol Bridge	팔결교		Cheongju City	Cheongwon District	
Palgyeol Bridge			Cheongju City	Cheongwon District Ochang-eup	
Gagok IS	가곡삼거리	Palgyeol-ro	Cheongju City	Cheongwon District Ochang-eup	
Changri IS	창리사거리	Prefectural Route 508; Prefectural Route 510 (Jungbu-ro)	Cheongju City	Cheongwon District Ochang-eup	Prefectural Route 510 overlap
Ochang IS	오창사거리	Prefectural Route 510 (Dureungyuri-ro)	Cheongju City	Cheongwon District Ochang-eup	Prefectural Route 510 overlap
Bokhyeon IS	복현 교차로	Hwabuk-ro	Cheongju City	Cheongwon District Ochang-eup	
Bokhyeon Bridge	복현교		Cheongju City	Cheongwon District Ochang-eup	
Wonri IS	원리 교차로	Wolliyeocheon-gil	Cheongju City	Cheongwon District Ochang-eup	
Doha IS	도하 교차로	Munjin-ro	Jincheon County	Munbaek-myeon	
Okseong IS	옥성 교차로	Okseong 2-gil	Jincheon County	Munbaek-myeon	
Taerak IS	태락 교차로	Munjin-ro	Jincheon County	Munbaek-myeon	
Jincheon Tunnel	진천터널		Jincheon County	Munbaek-myeon	Approximately 1,080m
Jincheon Tunnel			Jincheon County	Jincheon-eup	Approximately 1,080m
Wondeok IS	원덕 교차로	Wondeok-ro	Jincheon County	Jincheon-eup	
Haengjeong IS	행정 교차로	National Route 34 (Baekgong-ro)	Jincheon County	Jincheon-eup	
Baekgok Bridge	백곡교		Jincheon County	Jincheon-eup	
Sagok IS	사곡 교차로	Jingwang-ro	Jincheon County	Iwol-myeon	
Jungsan Bridge	중산대교		Jincheon County	Iwol-myeon	
Sinwol IS	신월 교차로	Jungmi-ro	Jincheon County	Iwol-myeon	
Sadang Bridge	사당교		Jincheon County	Iwol-myeon	
North Jincheon IC (Jangyang IS)	북진천 나들목 (장양 교차로)	Pyeongtaek-Jecheon Expressway; Prefectural Route 302 (Ideong-ro)	Jincheon County	Iwol-myeon	Connected with Mijam IS
Geumgok IS	금곡 교차로	Salcheoni-gil	Jincheon County	Gwanghyewon-myeon	
Somul IS	소물 교차로	Jingwang-ro	Jincheon County	Gwanghyewon-myeon	
Gwanghyewon IS	광혜원 교차로	Gwanghyewonsandan-gil	Jincheon County	Gwanghyewon-myeon	
Hwaryang Bridge	화량교		Jincheon County	Gwanghyewon-myeon	
Silwon IS	실원 교차로	Prefectural Route 82 (Jingwang-ro)	Jincheon County	Gwanghyewon-myeon	
Dugyo Bridge	두교교		Jincheon County	Gwanghyewon-myeon	Continuation into Gyeonggi Province

=== Gyeonggi Province ===
Name	Hangul name	Connection	Location		Note
Dugyo Bridge Dugyo 1 Bridge	두교교 두교1교		Anseong City	Juksan-myeon	North Chungcheong Province – Gyeonggi Province border line
Dugyo IS (Dugyo 2 Bridge)	두교 교차로 (두교2교)	Prefectural Route 82 (Geolmi-ro); Yongdae-gil	Anseong City	Juksan-myeon	
Dugyo 3 Bridge	두교3교		Anseong City	Juksan-myeon	
Dangmok IS	당목 교차로	Yongseol-ro	Anseong City	Juksan-myeon	
Yongseol IS (Yongseol 1 Bridge)	용설 교차로 (용설1교)	Yongseol-ro; Geogok-gil	Anseong City	Juksan-myeon	
Yongseol 2 Bridge Yongseol 3 Bridge	용설2교 용설3교		Anseong City	Juksan-myeon	
Jangwon IS	장원 교차로	Jangwonnamsan-gil	Anseong City	Juksan-myeon	
Juksan IS (Juksan 1 Bridge)	죽산 교차로 (죽산1교)	National Route 38; Prefectural Route 70 (Seodong-daero)	Anseong City	Juksan-myeon	Prefectural Route 70 overlap
Maesan IS	매산삼거리	Hagusan-gil	Anseong City	Juksan-myeon	Prefectural Route 70 overlap
No name	(이름 없음)	Sanggusan-gil	Anseong City	Juksan-myeon	Prefectural Route 70 overlap
Hanpyeong Bridge	한평교		Anseong City	Juksan-myeon	Prefectural Route 70 overlap
Hanpyeong Bridge			Anseong City	Iljuk-myeon	Prefectural Route 70 overlap
Bangcho Bridge	방초교		Anseong City	Iljuk-myeon	Prefectural Route 70 overlap
Obang IS	오방삼거리	Prefectural Route 70 (Sasil-ro)	Anseong City	Iljuk-myeon	Prefectural Route 70 overlap
Bangcho IS	방초 교차로	Obang-gil	Anseong City	Iljuk-myeon	
Goan IS	고안 교차로	Goan-ro; Goan-ro 181beon-gil	Yongin City	Cheoin District Baegam-myeon	
Baekbong IS	백봉삼거리	Goan-ro 51beon-gil	Yongin City	Cheoin District Baegam-myeon	
Yangyang Gas Station IS National Ready-mixed IS	양양주유소앞삼거리 국민레미콘앞삼거리		Yongin City	Cheoin District Baegam-myeon	
Baekbong IS	백봉 교차로	Prefectural Route 318 (Wonseol-ro)	Yongin City	Cheoin District Baegam-myeon	
Baekam IS	백암 교차로	Baekam-ro	Yongin City	Cheoin District Baegam-myeon	
Wondae Bridge	원대교		Yongin City	Cheoin District Baegam-myeon	
Baekam IS	백암사거리	Bakgok-ro; Baekwon-ro	Yongin City	Cheoin District Baegam-myeon	
Geungok IS	근곡사거리	Prefectural Route 325 (Deokpyeong-ro) (Baegam-ro)	Yongin City	Cheoin District Baegam-myeon	
Geungok IS	근곡삼거리	Jugyang-daero1342 beon-gil	Yongin City	Cheoin District Baegam-myeon	
Nodong IS	노동삼거리	Geungok-ro	Yongin City	Cheoin District Baegam-myeon	
Taepyeongchon Entrance IS	태평촌입구삼거리	Seoksil-ro	Yongin City	Cheoin District Baegam-myeon	
Duchang IS	두창삼거리	Duchang-ro; Seoksil-ro	Yongin City	Cheoin District Baegam-myeon	
Duchang IS	두창삼거리	Duchang-ro; Seoksil-ro	Yongin City	Cheoin District Wonsam-myeon	
Gajaewol IS	가재월사거리	Bogaewonsam-ro	Yongin City	Cheoin District Wonsam-myeon	
Neungan IS	능안삼거리	Mipyeong-ro	Yongin City	Cheoin District Wonsam-myeon	
Wonsam IS	원삼사거리	Maengri-ro; Jugyang-daero1763 beon-gil	Yongin City	Cheoin District Wonsam-myeon	
Wonsam IS	원삼 교차로	Jwajeon-ro	Yongin City	Cheoin District Wonsam-myeon	
Pyeongchang IS	평창사거리	Dochang-ro; Jwajeon-ro	Yongin City	Cheoin District Yangji-myeon	
Youth training center Entrance IS	청소년수련원입구삼거리	Jugyang-daero2071 beon-gil	Yongin City	Cheoin District Yangji-myeon	
Jeil IS	제일삼거리	Nampyeong-ro	Yongin City	Cheoin District Yangji-myeon	
Yonggurigogae	용구리고개		Yongin City	Cheoin District Yangji-myeon	
Jeil IS	제일사거리	Nampyeong-ro	Yongin City	Cheoin District Yangji-myeon	
Yangji IC	양지 나들목	Yeongdong Expressway; National Route 42 (Jungbu-daero)	Yongin City	Cheoin District Yangji-myeon	Terminus
