= National Route 36 (South Korea) =

Road in South Korea

National Route 36
- 국도 제36호선

Route information
- Length: 388.2 km (241.2 mi)
- Existed: 31 August 1971–present

Major junctions
- West end: Boryeong, Chungcheongnam-do; National Route 77
- East end: Uljin, Gyeongsangbuk-do; National Route 7

Location
- Country: South Korea

Highway system
- Highway systems of South Korea; Expressways; National; Local

National Route 36 (Korean: 국도 제 36호선, Gukdo Je Samsip-yuk(36) Hoseon) is a national highway in South Korea connects Boryeong to Sejong City, Cheongju, Chungju, and Uljin. It established on 31 August 1971.

== History ==
- August 31, 1971: The Daecheon–Uljin Line, was designated under the General National Highway Route Designation Decree.
- September 8, 1973: Due to improvements to the road alignment, the road district was changed so that the 365 m section in Bong'an-ri, Janggi-myeon, Gongju County, became 460 m, while the 180 m section between Gwangdae-ri and Dae'chi-ri, Dae'chi-myeon, Cheongyang County, became 222 m.
- August 8, 1975: A total 1.11 km section between Ansim-ri, Mok-myeon, Cheongyang County, and Eupnae-ri, Cheongyang-myeon, was opened, and the existing 1.705 km section was abolished. A 125 m section in Dongdae-ri, Useong-myeon, Gongju County, was also opened, while the existing 139 m section was abolished.
- May 13, 1986: The starting point was changed from Daecheon-eup, Daecheon County, Chungcheongnam-do, to Daecheon City, Chungcheongnam-do.
- June 21, 1986: Due to the construction of Chungju Dam, a 7.7 km section between Sinhyeon-ri, Deoksan-myeon, Jewon County, and Susan-ri, Susan-myeon, was relocated and opened.
- September 29, 1986: Due to the construction of Chungju Dam, the 23.9 km section between Naesadong, Salmi-myeon, Jungwon County, and Susan-ri and Gyeran-ri, Susan-myeon, Jewon County, as well as the 9.7 km section between Janghui-ri and Sangbang-ri, Danyang-eup, Danyang County, were abolished because the roads were submerged.
- November 9, 1987: A total 12.02 km section between Jujung-ri, Bugil-myeon, Cheongwon County, and Jeungpyeong-ri, Jeungpyeong-eup, Goesan County, was opened, while the existing 12.73 km section was abolished.
- January 17, 1992: A 340 m section in Uipyeong-ri, Cheongna-myeon, Boryeong County, was opened.
- August 13, 1994: The Jeungpyeong–Chungju section was expanded to four lanes and opened.
- July 1, 1996: The starting point was changed from Daecheon City, Chungcheongnam-do, to Boryeong City, Chungcheongnam-do. The route consequently became the Boryeong–Uljin Line.
- January 8, 1999: A new 2.56 km section between Janggye-ri and Gujae-ri, Hwaseong-myeon, Cheongyang County, was opened, while the existing 2.8 km section was abolished.
- December 9, 1999: A new 1.371 km section between Maesan-ri and Sinjeong-ri, Hwaseong-myeon, Cheongyang County, was opened, while the existing 1.4 km section was abolished.
- August 26, 2000: A new 600 m section in Jigok-ri, Jeongsan-myeon, Cheongyang County, was opened, while the existing section was abolished.
- December 30, 2000: The 3.27 km Cheongna bypass road between Uipyeong-ri and Soyang-ri, Cheongna-myeon, Boryeong City, was opened.
- September 29, 2001: The 11.4 km section between Hyochon-ri, Namil-myeon, Cheongwon County, and Hyuam-dong, Heungdeok-gu, Cheongju City, was designated as an automobile-only road.
- January 10, 2002: A 4.76 km section of the Beopjeon–Socheon road between Eoji-ri, Beopjeon-myeon, Bonghwa County, and Hyeondong-ri, Socheon-myeon, was widened and opened. The existing 7.5 km section was abolished.
- January 16, 2004: A 220 m section in Mureung-ri, Salmi-myeon, Chungju City, was widened and opened.
- December 1, 2004: A 5.24 km section between Jangseung-ri, Cheongyang-eup, Cheongyang County, and Tanjeong-ri, Dae'chi-myeon, was widened and opened, while the existing 3.5 km section was abolished.
- December 31, 2004: A 21.38 km section between Dongdae-ri, Useong-myeon, Gongju City, and Jongchon-ri, Nam-myeon, Yeongi County, was widened and opened, while the existing 21.44 km section was abolished.
- September 6, 2005: The 13.43 km section between Yullyang-dong, Sangdang-gu, Cheongju City, and Oksu-ri, Bugimyeon, Cheongwon County, was designated as an automobile-only road.
- December 12, 2005: A 14.48 km section of the Yeongju–Bonghwa road between Sangmang-dong, Yeongju City, and Geumbong-ri, Bongseong-myeon, Bonghwa County, was widened and opened, while the existing 16.0 km section was abolished.
- December 21, 2005: The 5.44 km Yeongju National Highway Bypass Road, consisting of the Sinjeon–Gaheung road between Gaheung-dong, Yeongju City, and Sinjeon-ri, Anjeong-myeon, was widened and opened, while the existing 4.75 km section was abolished.
- December 21, 2007: A 14.2 km section of the Bonghwa–Beopjeon road and part of the Beopjeon–Socheon road, between Geumbong-ri, Bongseong-myeon, Bonghwa County, and Soji-ri, Beopjeon-myeon, was widened and opened. The existing 15.2 km section was abolished.
- December 24, 2007: The 3.8 km Mok-myeon bypass road between Daepyeong-ri and Songam-ri, Mok-myeon, Cheongyang County, was newly constructed and opened, while the existing 2.4 km section between Daepyeong-ri and Ansim-ri was abolished.
- April 3, 2008: On the Yullyang–Bugyi road, the endpoint of the automobile-only section between Yullyang-dong, Sangdang-gu, Cheongju City, and Oksu-ri, Bugimyeon, was changed to Geumam-ri, Bugimyeon, shortening the section by 1.92 km.
- May 4, 2010: The 6.05 km section between Gaheung-dong and Sangmang-dong, Yeongju City, was designated as an automobile-only road.
- December 30, 2011: Sections of the Beopjeon–Socheon road, consisting of 4.97 km between Soji-ri and Eoji-ri, Beopjeon-myeon, Bonghwa County, and 2.45 km in Hyeondong-ri, Socheon-myeon, were widened and opened. The existing 2.0 km section between Soro-ri, Chunyang-myeon, and Socheon-ri, Beopjeon-myeon, and the existing 1.6 km section in Hyeondong-ri, Socheon-myeon, were abolished.
- December 30, 2013: The 13.4 km Cheongju–Jeungpyeong road between Yullyang-dong, Sangdang-gu, Cheongju City, and Oksu-ri, Bugimyeon, Cheongwon County, was widened and opened, while the existing 11.2 km section was abolished.
- January 5, 2016: A 6.2 km section of Section 3 of the Socheon–Seomyeon road between Ssangjeon-ri and Samgeun-ri, Geumgangsong-myeon, Uljin County, was widened and opened. The existing 8.45 km section was abolished.
- February 5, 2016: A 3.3 km section of Section 2 of the Socheon–Seomyeon road between Gwanghoe-ri and Ssangjeon-ri, Geumgangsong-myeon, Uljin County, was widened and opened. The existing 6.0 km section was abolished.
- May 3, 2016: Following the opening of the Socheon–Seomyeon road, the route between Buncheon-ri, Socheon-myeon, Bonghwa County, and Ssangjeon-ri, Geumgangsong-myeon, Uljin County, was changed from 10.0 km to 6.8 km.
- May 4, 2016: A 2.4 km section of Section 1 of the Socheon–Seomyeon road between Buncheon-ri, Socheon-myeon, Bonghwa County, and Gwanghoe-ri, Geumgangsong-myeon, Uljin County, was widened and opened, while the existing 3.3 km section was abolished. A 3.5 km section of Section 2 in Gwanghoe-ri, Geumgangsong-myeon, Uljin County, was also widened and opened, while the existing 7.3 km section was abolished.
- July 20, 2016: A new 5.5 km section of Section 1 of the Socheon–Seomyeon road between Hyeondong-ri and Buncheon-ri, Socheon-myeon, Bonghwa County, was opened. The existing 8.0 km section was abolished.
- August 31, 2016: Following the opening of the Huam–Odong road of the Cheongju National Highway Bypass Road, the existing 15.7 km section between Suui-dong, Heungdeok-gu, Cheongju City, and Gukdong-ri, Naesu-eup, Cheongwon-gu, was abolished.
- December 28, 2016: A 5.1 km section of the Punggi–Dogye road between Baeksin-ri and Sucheol-ri, Punggi-eup, Yeongju City, was widened and opened, while the existing 2.0 km section was abolished.
- January 1, 2017: A 12.2 km section of the first construction section of the Cheongyang Dae'chi–Gongju Useong road between Tanjeong-ri, Dae'chi-myeon, and Daebak-ri, Jeongsan-myeon, Cheongyang County, was widened and opened, while the existing 14.9 km section between Tanjeong-ri and Seojeong-ri was abolished. A total 13.3 km section of the second construction section between Daebak-ri, Jeongsan-myeon, and Daepyeong-ri, Mok-myeon, Cheongyang County, and between Songam-ri, Mok-myeon, and Danji-ri, Useong-myeon, Gongju City, was also widened and opened, while the existing 4.1 km section between Seojeong-ri, Jeongsan-myeon, and Daepyeong-ri, Mok-myeon, and the existing 1.8 km section between Bangheung-ri and Dongdae-ri, Useong-myeon, Gongju City, were abolished.
- April 13, 2017: Due to an improvement to the road alignment, a total 325 m section in Naesa-ri, Salmi-myeon, Chungju City, was abolished.
- December 1, 2017: A 1.5 km section of the Danyang IC–Danyang road between Jangnim-ri and Bukha-ri, Daegang-myeon, Danyang County, was widened and opened.
- September 21, 2018: The 6.6 km Gaheung–Sangmang road of the Yeongju National Highway Bypass Road between Gaheung-dong and Sangmang-dong, Yeongju City, was widened and opened, while the existing 5.7 km section through the city center was abolished.
- December 31, 2018: A total 6.9 km section of the first construction section of the Boryeong–Cheongyang road, consisting of a 3.84 km section between Hwasan-dong and Uipyeong-ri, Cheongna-myeon, Boryeong City, and a 3.06 km section between Soyang-ri, Cheongna-myeon, and Janggye-ri, Hwaseong-myeon, Cheongyang County, was widened and opened.
- August 20, 2019: Following the opening of the first construction section of the Boryeong–Cheongyang road, the existing 1.0 km section in Hyangcheon-ri, Cheongna-myeon, Boryeong City, was abolished.
- September 30, 2019: A 900 m section of the second construction section of the Seomyeon–Geunnam road in Onyang-ri, Uljin-eup, Uljin County, was partially widened and opened.
- December 30, 2019: A 5.74 km section of the second construction section of the Boryeong–Cheongyang road between Gujae-ri, Hwaseong-myeon, and Jangseung-ri, Cheongyang-eup, was widened and opened, while the existing 3.79 km section between Maesan-ri, Hwaseong-myeon, and Jangseung-ri, Cheongyang-eup, was abolished.
- April 1, 2020: An 18.08 km section of Sections 1 and 2 of the Seomyeon–Geunnam road between Samgeun-ri, Geumgangsong-myeon, and Onyang-ri, Uljin-eup, Uljin County, was newly constructed and opened.
- July 25, 2024: Section 1-1 of the Chungcheong Inland Expressway, between Geumam-ri, Bugimyeon, Cheongwon-gu, Cheongju City, and Hwaseong-ri, Doan-myeon, Jeungpyeong County, was opened.
- December 31, 2024: Section 1-2 of the Chungcheong Inland Expressway, between Hwaseong-ri and Songjeong-ri, Doan-myeon, Jeungpyeong County, and Bocheon-ri, Wonnam-myeon, Eumseong County, was opened.
- April 30, 2025: Section 1-2 of the Chungcheong Inland Expressway, between Bocheon-ri and Sangdang-ri, Wonnam-myeon, Eumseong County, was opened.
- September 29, 2025: Section 2 of the Chungcheong Inland Expressway, between Hano-ri, Wonnam-myeon, Eumseong County, and Daejang-ri, Soi-myeon, was opened.
- November 18, 2025: Section 2-3 of the Chungcheong Inland Expressway, between Daejang-ri, Soi-myeon, Eumseong County, and Manjeong-ri, Daesowon-myeon, Chungju City, was opened.
- December 30, 2025: Sections 4-5 of the Chungcheong Inland Expressway, between Manjeong-ri, Daesowon-myeon, Chungju City, and Bongyang-eup, Jecheon City, as well as the Eumseong 2 interchange, were opened.

== Main stopovers ==
South Chungcheong Province

- Boryeong - Cheongyang County - Gongju

Sejong City

- Janggun-myeon - Hansol-dong - Yeongi-myeon - Yeonseo-myeon - Jochiwon-eup

North Chungcheong Province

- Cheongju (Heungdeok District - Seowon District - Sangdang District - Cheongwon District) - Jeungpyeong County - Eumseong County - Chungju - Jecheon - Danyang County

North Gyeongsang Province

- Yeongju - Bonghwa County - Uljin County

== Major intersections ==
- (■): Motorway
- IS: Intersection(Korean: 교차로)
- 3-IS: 3-way Intersection(Korean: 삼거리)
- 4-IS: 4-way Intersection(Korean: 사거리)
- 5-IS: 5-way Intersection(Korean: 오거리)
- 6-IS: 6-way Intersection(Korean: 육거리)
- 7-IS: 7-way Intersection(Korean: 칠거리)
- IC: Interchange(Korean: 나들목)

=== South Chungcheong Province and Sejong City ===
Name	Hangul name	Connection	Location		Note
Daecheon Port	대천항		Boryeong City	Daecheon-dong	Terminus; National Route 77 overlap
Daecheonseo Middle School (Daecheon Beach Bus Terminal)	대천서중학교 (대천해수욕장시외버스정류장)		Boryeong City	Daecheon-dong	National Route 77 overlap
Heukpo 3-IS	흑포삼거리	Prefectural Route 607 (Daehae-ro)	Boryeong City	Daecheon-dong	National Route 77 overlap
Cheongnyong Elementary School	청룡초등학교		Boryeong City	Daecheon-dong	National Route 77 overlap
Haemangsan 3-IS	해망산삼거리	Haemangsan-gil	Boryeong City	Daecheon-dong	National Route 77 overlap
Yoam 3-IS	요암삼거리	Dwitgol-gil	Boryeong City	Daecheon-dong	National Route 77 overlap
Daecheon IC	대천 나들목	Seohaean Expressway	Boryeong City	Daecheon-dong	National Route 77 overlap
Namgok 4-IS	남곡사거리	Hwanggol-gil	Boryeong City	Daecheon-dong	National Route 77 overlap
Daecheon Station (Daecheon Station 4-IS)	대천역 (대천역사거리)		Boryeong City	Daecheon-dong	National Route 77 overlap
Boryeong Bus Terminal (Terminal 4-IS)	보령종합버스터미널 (터미널사거리)	Namdaecheon-ro; Myeonghae-ro	Boryeong City	Daecheon-dong	National Route 77 overlap
Gungchon 4-IS	궁촌사거리	Hyeonchungtap-gil	Boryeong City	Daecheon-dong	National Route 77 overlap
Sucheong 4-IS	수청사거리	Boryeongnam-ro; Jungang-ro	Boryeong City	Daecheon-dong	National Route 77 overlap
Jugong 4-IS	주공사거리	Jugong-ro	Boryeong City	Daecheon-dong	National Route 77 overlap
Dongdae 4-IS	동대사거리	Boryeongbuk-ro; Hannae-ro	Boryeong City	Daecheon-dong	National Route 77 overlap
Sinseol 4-IS	신설사거리	Donghyeon-ro; Sinpyeong-ro	Boryeong City	Daecheon-dong	National Route 77 overlap
Hwasan IS	화산교차로	National Route 21; National Route 40; National Route 77 (Chungseo-ro)	Boryeong City	Daecheon-dong	National Route 77 overlap
Hwasan 4-IS	화산사거리	Ongma-ro	Boryeong City	Daecheon-dong	
Goindol 3-IS	고인돌삼거리	Daecheon-ro	Boryeong City	Daecheon-dong	
Hyangcheon IS	향천교차로	Cheongseong-ro	Boryeong City	Cheongna-myeon	
Euepyeong 3-IS	의평삼거리	Naengpungyokjang-gil	Boryeong City	Cheongna-myeon	
Euepyeong IS	의평교차로	Wonmoru-gil	Boryeong City	Cheongna-myeon	
Cheongna IS	청라교차로	Prefectural Route 609 (Dangan-gil)	Boryeong City	Cheongna-myeon	
Soyang 3-IS	소양삼거리	Wonmoru-gil	Boryeong City	Cheongna-myeon	
Gukwon IS	국원교차로	Muhal-ro	Cheongyang County	Hwaseong-myeon	
Gujae 3-IS	구제삼거리	Gusutgol-gil	Cheongyang County	Hwaseong-myeon	
Yeojujae	여주재		Cheongyang County	Cheongyang-eup	
No name	(이름 없음)	Gundeuljae-gil	Cheongyang County	Cheongyang-eup	
Jangseung IS	장승교차로	Chilgapsal-ro	Cheongyang County	Cheongyang-eup	
Songbang IS	송방교차로	Gubong-ro	Cheongyang County	Cheongyang-eup	
Byeokcheon IS	벽천교차로	National Route 29 (Chungjeol-ro); Munhwayesul-ro	Cheongyang County	Cheongyang-eup	
Tanjeong 3-IS	탄정삼거리	Prefectural Route 70; Prefectural Route 645 (Chilgapsal-ro)	Cheongyang County	Daechi-myeon	Prefectural Route 645 overlap
Tanjeong Bridge IS	탄정교교차로	Jujeon-ro	Cheongyang County	Daechi-myeon	Prefectural Route 645 overlap
Sujeong Elementary School Daechi-myeon Office	수정초등학교 대치면사무소		Cheongyang County	Daechi-myeon	Prefectural Route 645 overlap
Jujeong 3-IS	주정삼거리	Prefectural Route 645 (Kkachinae-ro)	Cheongyang County	Daechi-myeon	Prefectural Route 645 overlap
Chilgap Bridge	칠갑대교		Cheongyang County	Daechi-myeon	
Daechi Tunnel	대치터널		Cheongyang County	Daechi-myeon	Approximately 425m
Cheonjang 3-IS	천장삼거리	Sindeok-gil	Cheongyang County	Jeongsan-myeon	
Jeongsan-myeon Office Jeongsan High School Jeongsan Bus Terminal	정산면사무소 정산고등학교 정산시외버스터미널		Cheongyang County	Jeongsan-myeon	
Seojeongri 4-IS	서정리사거리	National Route 39 (Chungui-ro)	Cheongyang County	Jeongsan-myeon	
Jigok 4-IS	지곡사거리	Keunbaek-gil	Cheongyang County	Mok-myeon	
Munseong Elementary School (Closed)	문성초등학교 (폐교)		Cheongyang County	Mok-myeon	
Ansim IS	안심교차로	Ansimdong-gil	Cheongyang County	Mok-myeon	
Mokmyeon IS	목면교차로	Musul-gil	Cheongyang County	Mok-myeon	
Songam 4-IS	송암사거리		Cheongyang County	Mok-myeon	
Gongsuwon 4-IS	공수원사거리	Prefectural Route 96 (Yongbongipdong-ro) (Yongbongeocheon-gil)	Gongju City	Useong-myeon	
West Gongju IC (Bangheung IS)	서공주 나들목 (방흥교차로)	Seocheon-Gongju Expressway	Gongju City	Useong-myeon	
Useong IS	우성교차로	National Route 32 (Dongdaeri-gil)	Gongju City	Useong-myeon	National Route 32 overlap
No name	(이름 없음)	Useong-gil	Gongju City	Useong-myeon	National Route 32 overlap
No name	(이름 없음)	Okseong-gil	Gongju City	Useong-myeon	National Route 32 overlap
Jilma IS	질마교차로	National Route 32 (Geumbyeong-ro)	Gongju City	Useong-myeon	National Route 32 overlap
No name	(이름 없음)	Museongsan-ro	Gongju City	Useong-myeon	
No name	(이름 없음)	Wolmidong-gil	Gongju City	Shinkwan-dong	
Gwisan Overpass	귀산육교	Gwisan-gil	Gongju City	Shinkwan-dong	
Mokcheon IS	목천교차로	National Route 23 (Charyeong-daero)	Gongju City	Useong-myeon	National Route 23 overlap
Cheongryong IS	청룡교차로	Prefectural Route 627 (Uidangjeonui-ro)	Gongju City	Uidang-myeon	National Route 23 overlap
Songseon IS	송선교차로	National Route 23 (Charyeong-daero); Janggi-ro	Gongju City	Wolsong-dong	National Route 23 overlap
No name	(이름 없음)	Jangcheok-ro	Gongju City	Wolsong-dong	
West Sejong IC	서세종 나들목	Dangjin-Yeongdeok Expressway	Gongju City	Wolsong-dong	
Habong IS	하봉교차로	Jangcheok-ro	Sejong City	Janggun-myeon	
Eunyong IS	은용교차로	Prefectural Route 691 (Sinhakri-gil)	Sejong City	Janggun-myeon	
Bongan IS	봉안교차로	Jangcheok-ro	Sejong City	Janggun-myeon	
No name	(이름 없음)	National Route 1 (Sejong-ro)	Sejong City	Jongchon-dong	National Route 1 overlap
No name	(이름 없음)	Mirinae-ro	Sejong City	Yeongi-myeon	National Route 1 overlap
Bitdol Tunnel	빗돌터널		Sejong City	Yeongi-myeon	National Route 1 overlap Approximately 310m
No name	(이름 없음)	Sejong 1-ro	Sejong City	Yeongi-myeon	National Route 1 overlap
Mogae Overpass	모개고가차도	National Route 43 (Jeongansejong-ro); Mirinae-ro	Sejong City	Yeongi-myeon	National Route 1 overlap
Yeongi 3-IS	연기삼거리	Suwang-ro	Sejong City	Yeongi-myeon	National Route 1 overlap
Yeongi 4-IS	연기사거리	Prefectural Route 627 (Dangsan-ro)	Sejong City	Yeongi-myeon	National Route 1 overlap
Yeongi Complex 4-IS	연기공단사거리	Gongdan-ro	Sejong City	Yeongi-myeon	National Route 1 overlap
No name	(이름 없음)	Bongam-gil	Sejong City	Yeonseo-myeon	National Route 1 overlap
Wolha 5-IS	월하오거리	Dangsan-ro	Sejong City	Yeonseo-myeon	National Route 1 overlap
Beonam 4-IS	번암사거리	National Route 1 (Sejong-ro)	Sejong City	Jochiwon-eup	National Route 1 overlap
Juklim 3-IS	죽림삼거리	Chunghyeon-ro	Sejong City	Jochiwon-eup	
Sangri 4-IS	상리사거리	Jochiwon-ro; Heomanseok-ro	Sejong City	Jochiwon-eup	
Jocheon Bridge	조천교		Sejong City	Jochiwon-eup	Out of Sejong City; Continuation into North Chungcheong

=== North Chungcheong Province ===
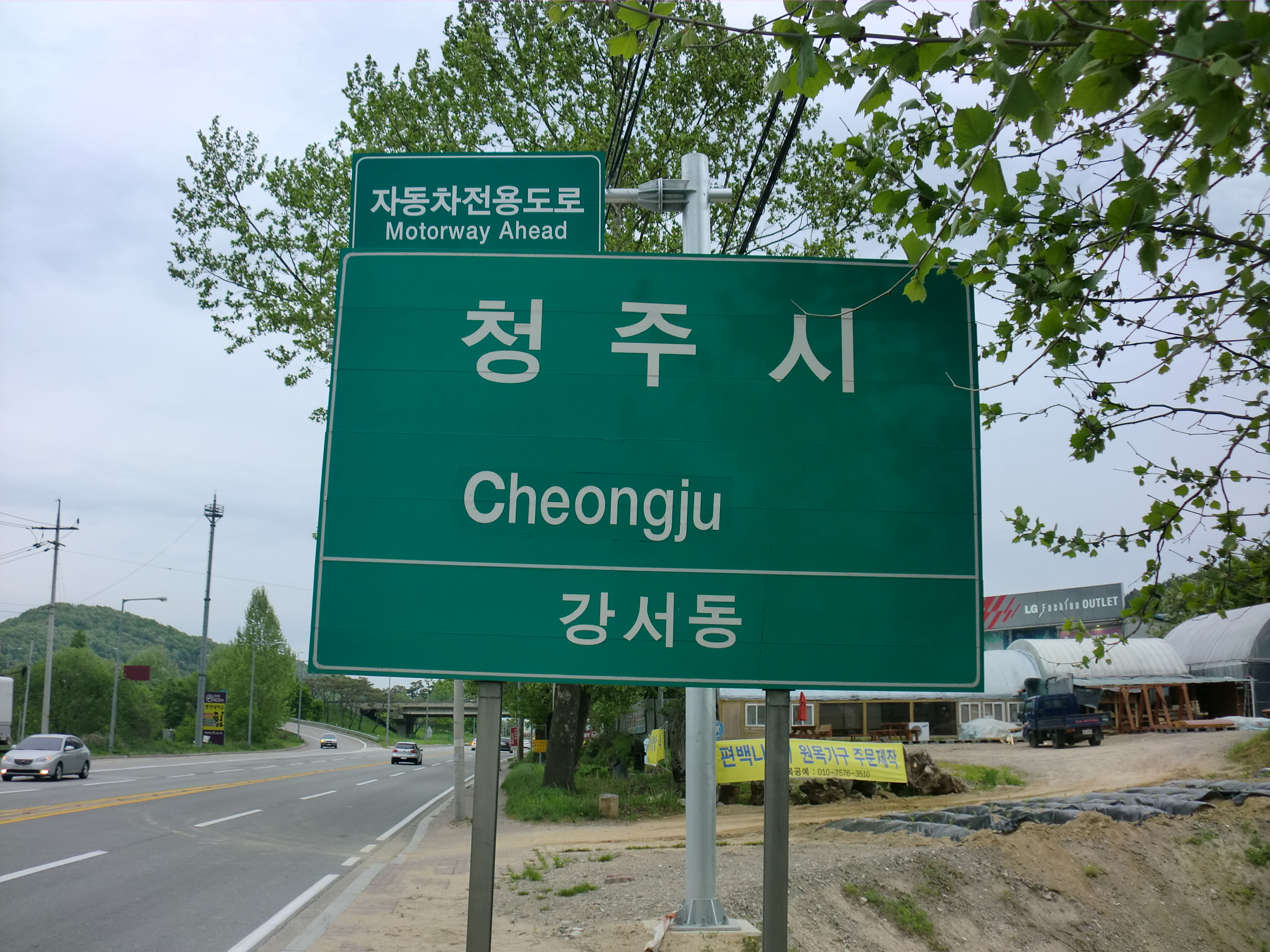
National Route 36 at Cheongju

Name	Hangul name	Connection	Location		Note
Jocheon Bridge	조천교		Cheongju City	Osong-eup (Heungdeok District)	Sejong City - North Chungcheong border line
Jeongjung 3-IS	정중삼거리	Mihocheon-gil; Jeongjungyeonje-ro	Cheongju City	Osong-eup (Heungdeok District)	
Seopyeong 3-IS	서평삼거리	Prefectural Route 604 (Cheongyeon-ro)	Cheongju City	Osong-eup (Heungdeok District)	
New market 3-IS	새장터삼거리	Osonggarak-ro	Cheongju City	Osong-eup (Heungdeok District)	
Osong 3-IS	오송삼거리	Prefectural Route 508 (Osong 2-gil)	Cheongju City	Osong-eup (Heungdeok District)	
Osong 2 IS	오송2교차로	Prefectural Route 604	Cheongju City	Osong-eup (Heungdeok District)	
Gungpyeong 1 IS	궁평1교차로	Osongsaengmyeong-ro	Cheongju City	Osong-eup (Heungdeok District)	
Tapyeon 3-IS	탑연삼거리	Prefectural Route 507 (Taeseongtabyeon-ro)	Cheongju City	Gangnae-myeon (Heungdeok District)	Prefectural Route 507 overlap
Wolgok 4-IS	월곡사거리	Prefectural Route 507 (Cheongjuyeok-ro); Wolgok-gil	Cheongju City	Gangnae-myeon (Heungdeok District)	Prefectural Route 507 overlap
Cheongju IC	청주 나들목	Gyeongbu Expressway	Cheongju City	Heungdeok District	
Cheongju Avenue of Trees	청주가로수길		Cheongju City	Heungdeok District	
Hyuamdong IS	휴암동교차로	Sinjeon-ro	Cheongju City	Heungdeok District	
Gangseo 4-IS Gangseo 1-dong Community Center	강서사거리 강서1동주민센터	Biha-ro	Cheongju City	Heungdeok District	
Terminal 4-IS	터미널사거리	2 Sunhwan-ro	Cheongju City	Heungdeok District	
No name	(이름 없음)	Gagyeong-ro; Daesin-ro	Cheongju City	Heungdeok District	
Bokdae 4-IS	복대사거리	Bokdae-ro	Cheongju City	Heungdeok District	
Industrial Complex 6-IS	산업단지육거리	Gongdan-ro; Naesudong-ro; Sandan-ro; Sinyul-ro	Cheongju City	Heungdeok District	
Chungdae 4-IS	충대사거리	Seongbong-ro; Wolmyeong-ro	Cheongju City	Heungdeok District	
Cheongju High School	청주고등학교		Cheongju City	Heungdeok District	
Sachang 4-IS	사창사거리	1 Sunhawn-ro	Cheongju City	Seowon District	
Clock Tower 5-IS	시계탑오거리	Naesudong-ro; Yeche-ro	Cheongju City	Seowon District	
Stadium 3-IS Cheongju Stadium	운동장삼거리 청주종합운동장		Cheongju City	Seowon District	
Gukporo 4-IS	국보로사거리	Hoguk-ro	Cheongju City	Seowon District	
Sajik 4-IS	사직사거리	Saun-ro	Cheongju City	Seowon District	
Cheongju Bridge	청주대교		Cheongju City	Seowon District	
Cheongju Bridge 4-IS	청주대교사거리	Musimdong-ro	Cheongju City	Sangdang District	
Sangdang 4-IS (Cheongju Underground Shopping Mall)	상당사거리 (청주지하상가)	National Route 17 (Sangdang-ro); Gyodong-ro	Cheongju City	Sangdang District	National Route 17 overlap
Cheongju City Hall	청주시청		Cheongju City	Sangdang District	National Route 17 overlap
Bangadari 4-IS	방아다리사거리	Sabuk-ro; Sangdang-ro 186beon-gil	Cheongju City	Sangdang District	National Route 17 overlap
Uam 5-IS	우암오거리	Hyanggun-ro; Jungang-ro 103beon-gil Sangdang-ro 204beon-gil	Cheongju City	Cheongwon District	National Route 17 overlap
Uam Elementary School	우암초등학교		Cheongju City	Cheongwon District	National Route 17 overlap
Cheongdae 4-IS (Cheongju University)	청대사거리 (청주대학교)	Daeseong-ro; Jikji-daero	Cheongju City	Cheongwon District	National Route 17 overlap
Naedeok 3-IS	내덕삼거리	Saeteo-ro	Cheongju City	Cheongwon District	National Route 17 overlap
Naedeok 7-IS	내덕칠거리	National Route 17 (Gonghang-ro); Naedeok-ro; Andeokbeol-ro; Uam-ro; Chungcheong-daero 1beon-gil	Cheongju City	Cheongwon District	National Route 17 overlap
Naedeok 2-dong Community Center	내덕2동주민센터		Cheongju City	Cheongwon District	
Yullyang Bridge 4-IS	율량교사거리	1 Sunhawn-ro; Chungcheong-daero	Cheongju City	Cheongwon District	
Sangri IS	상리 교차로	2 Sunhwan-ro	Cheongju City	Cheongwon District	
Sangri Tunnel	상리터널		Cheongju City	Cheongwon District	Approximately 470m
Mukbang IS	묵방 교차로	Mukbang 2-gil	Cheongju City	Naesu-eup (Cheongwon District)	
Dowon IS	도원 교차로	Dowonsegyo-ro	Cheongju City	Naesu-eup (Cheongwon District)	
Hakpyeong IS	학평 교차로	Prefectural Route 511; Prefectural Route 540 (Chojeongyaksu-ro)	Cheongju City	Naesu-eup (Cheongwon District)	
Hakpyeong Underpass	학평지하차도		Cheongju City	Naesu-eup (Cheongwon District)	
Singi IS	신기 교차로	Singichojeong-ro	Cheongju City	Buki-myeon (Cheongwon District)	
Jangjae IS	장재 교차로	Jangjaegeum-daero	Cheongju City	Buki-myeon (Cheongwon District)	
Naechu IS	내추 교차로	Prefectural Route 592 (Chungcheong-daero)	Cheongju City	Buki-myeon (Cheongwon District)	Prefectural Route 592 overlap
Oksu IS	옥수 교차로	Naechuoksu-gil	Cheongju City	Buki-myeon (Cheongwon District)	Prefectural Route 592 overlap
Oksu 3-IS	옥수삼거리	Jungang-ro	Cheongju City	Buki-myeon (Cheongwon District)	Prefectural Route 592 overlap
Chojung 4-IS	초중사거리	National Route 34 (Sambo-ro)	Jeungpyeong County	Jeungpyeong-eup	National Route 34 overlap Prefectural Route 592 overlap
Guncheong 4-IS	군청사거리	Prefectural Route 540; Prefectural Route 592 (Gwangjang-ro)	Jeungpyeong County	Jeungpyeong-eup	National Route 34 overlap Prefectural Route 592 overlap
Witjangtteul 4-IS	윗장뜰사거리	Jungang-ro; Jeungpyeong-ro; Songsan-ro 4-gil	Jeungpyeong County	Jeungpyeong-eup	National Route 34 overlap
Eastern bypass road 3-IS	동부우회도로삼거리	Dureum-ro	Jeungpyeong County	Jeungpyeong-eup	National Route 34 overlap
Miam Bridge	미암교		Jeungpyeong County	Jeungpyeong-eup	National Route 34 overlap
Hwaseong IS	화성교차로	National Route 34 (Jungbu-ro)	Jeungpyeong County	Jeungpyeong-eup	National Route 34 overlap
Hwaseong 3-IS	화성삼거리	Moraejae-ro	Jeungpyeong County	Doan-myeon	
No name	(이름 없음)	Hwaseong-ro	Jeungpyeong County	Doan-myeon	
Doan 3-IS	도안삼거리	Hwaseong-ro	Jeungpyeong County	Doan-myeon	
Gwangdeok 4-IS	광덕사거리	Prefectural Route 510 (Wonmyeong-ro) (Insam-ro)	Jeungpyeong County	Doan-myeon	
No name	(이름 없음)	Chungcheong-daero 374beon-gil	Eumseong County	Wonnam-myeon	
Baengmaryeong Tunnel	백마령터널		Eumseong County	Wonnam-myeon	Right tunnel: Approximately 441m Left tunnel: Approximately 480m
No name	(이름 없음)	Bocheon-ro	Eumseong County	Wonnam-myeon	
Bocheon 3-IS (Bocheon Station)	보천삼거리 (보천역)	Prefectural Route 515 (Bocheon-ro)	Eumseong County	Wonnam-myeon	Prefectural Route 515 overlap
Masong 3-IS	마송삼거리	Prefectural Route 515 (Wonso-ro)	Eumseong County	Wonnam-myeon	Prefectural Route 515 overlap
Ban Ki-moon birthplace	반기문사무총장 생가		Eumseong County	Wonnam-myeon	
Hadang 3-IS	하당삼거리	National Route 37 (Sanggyeong-ro)	Eumseong County	Wonnam-myeon	National Route 37 overlap
Eumseong IS	음성교차로	National Route 37 (Saengeum-daero)	Eumseong County	Wonnam-myeon	National Route 37 overlap
Sincheon 3-IS	신천삼거리	Bangimun-ro	Eumseong County	Wonnam-myeon	
Pyeonggok 4-IS	평곡사거리	Prefectural Route 516 (Hanbul-ro)	Eumseong County	Eumseong-eup	
Hanbeol 3-IS	한벌삼거리	Jungang-ro	Eumseong County	Eumseong-eup	
Bisan 4-IS	비산사거리	Prefectural Route 49 (Soi-ro)	Eumseong County	Soi-myeon	
Soi 3-IS	소이삼거리	Bisan-ro	Eumseong County	Soi-myeon	
Yangji 3-IS	양지삼거리	Husam-ro	Chungju City	Judeok-eup	
Judeok 3-IS	주덕삼거리	Sinyang-ro	Chungju City	Judeok-eup	
Judeok 5-IS	주덕오거리	Prefectural Route 525 (Solgogae-ro); Sindeok-ro	Chungju City	Judeok-eup	Prefectural Route 525 overlap
Judeok IS	주덕교차로	National Route 3 (Jungwon-daero)	Chungju City	Judeok-eup	National Route 3 overlap Prefectural Route 525 overlap
Sinyang IS (Sinyang Overpass)	신양교차로 (신양육교)	Sinyang-ro	Chungju City	Judeok-eup	National Route 3 overlap Prefectural Route 525 overlap
Daesowon 4-IS	대소원사거리	Prefectural Route 599 (Soesil-ro)	Chungju City	Daesowon-myeon	National Route 3 overlap Prefectural Route 525, 599 overlap
Cheomdan 3-IS Daesowon Elementary School	첨단삼거리 대소원초등학교	Prefectural Route 599 (Cheomdansaneom-ro)	Chungju City	Daesowon-myeon	National Route 3 overlap Prefectural Route 525, 599 overlap
Chungju IC (Chungju IS)	충주 나들목 (충주교차로)	Jungbu Naeryuk Expressway	Chungju City	Daesowon-myeon	National Route 3 overlap Prefectural Route 525 overlap
Manjeok Bridge	만적교	Seongjongdudam-gil	Chungju City	Daesowon-myeon	National Route 3 overlap Prefectural Route 525 overlap
No name	(이름 없음)	Korea National University of Transportation; Gangdong College campus	Chungju City	Daesowon-myeon	National Route 3 overlap Prefectural Route 525 overlap
Dalcheon Station	달천역	Sangyongdu 2-gil	Chungju City	Dalcheon-dong	National Route 3 overlap Prefectural Route 525 overlap
Yongdu 4-IS	용두사거리	Prefectural Route 525 (Changhyeon-ro)	Chungju City	Dalcheon-dong	National Route 3 overlap Prefectural Route 525 overlap
Yongdu IS	용두 교차로	National Route 19 (Seobusunhwan-daero); Jungwon-daero	Chungju City	Dalcheon-dong	National Route 3, 19 overlap
Yonggwan Tunnel	용관터널		Chungju City	Dalcheon-dong	National Route 3, 19 overlap Right tunnel: Approximately 513m Left tunnel: Approximately 435m
Gaju IS	가주 교차로	Sogaju 1-gil	Chungju City	Dalcheon-dong	National Route 3, 19 overlap
Hapung IS	하풍 교차로	Pungdongdongmak-gil	Chungju City	Dalcheon-dong	National Route 3, 19 overlap
General Im Gyeong-eop IS	임경업장군 교차로	Sangpung 2-gil	Chungju City	Dalcheon-dong	National Route 3, 19 overlap
Pungdong IS	풍동 교차로	Jungwon-daero	Chungju City	Dalcheon-dong	National Route 3, 19 overlap
Hyangsan 3-IS	향산삼거리	Yujumang-ro	Chungju City	Salmi-myeon	National Route 3, 19 overlap
Hoeumsil 3-IS	호음실삼거리	Hoeumsil 1-gil	Chungju City	Salmi-myeon	National Route 3, 19 overlap
Munsan 3-IS	문산삼거리	Mungang-ro	Chungju City	Salmi-myeon	National Route 3, 19 overlap
Salmi 3-IS	살미삼거리	Seseong-ro	Chungju City	Salmi-myeon	National Route 3, 19 overlap
Seseong IS	세성교차로	National Route 19	Chungju City	Salmi-myeon	National Route 3, 19 overlap
Yongcheon 3-IS	용천삼거리	National Route 3 (Jungwon-daero)	Chungju City	Salmi-myeon	National Route 3 overlap
No name	(이름 없음)	Chungjuhosu-ro	Chungju City	Salmi-myeon	
Gongi 3-IS	공이삼거리	Gongidong-gil	Chungju City	Salmi-myeon	
Worak Bridge	월악교		Chungju City	Salmi-myeon	
Tanji 3-IS	탄지삼거리	Prefectural Route 597 (Mireuksonggye-ro)	Jecheon City	Hansu-myeon	
Seongcheon Bridge	성천교		Jecheon City	Deoksan-myeon	
Seongam 3-IS	성암삼거리	Prefectural Route 534 (Yakcho-ro)	Jecheon City	Deoksan-myeon	
Jeokgok-ri Entrance	적곡리입구	Insam-ro	Jecheon City	Susan-myeon	
Susan 4-IS	수산사거리	Prefectural Route 82 (Cheongpungho-ro); Worak-ro 26-gil	Jecheon City	Susan-myeon	
Susan Elementary School Susan Middle School	수산초등학교 수산중학교		Jecheon City	Susan-myeon	
Wondae 3-IS	원대삼거리	Oksunbong-ro	Jecheon City	Susan-myeon	
Gyeranjae	계란재		Jecheon City	Susan-myeon	
Janghoe Naru IS	장회나루교차로	Seolma-ro	Danyang County	Danseong-myeon	
Janghoe Bus stop	장회직행공동정류소		Danyang County	Danseong-myeon	
Uhwa 3-IS	우화삼거리	National Route 59 (Seonamgyegong-ro)	Danyang County	Danseong-myeon	National Route 59 overlap
Danseong Middle School	단성중학교		Danyang County	Danseong-myeon	National Route 59 overlap
Danseong 3-IS	단성삼거리	Chunghon-ro	Danyang County	Danseong-myeon	National Route 59 overlap
Bugha 3-IS	북하삼거리	National Route 5 National Route 59 (Danyang-ro)	Danyang County	Danseong-myeon	National Route 5, 59 overlap
Jangrim 4-IS	장림사거리	Prefectural Route 927 (Sainam-ro)	Danyang County	Daegang-myeon	National Route 5 overlap
Danyang IC (Daegang IS)	단양 나들목 (대강교차로)	Jungang Expressway	Danyang County	Daegang-myeon	National Route 5 overlap
Jungnyeong Station	죽령역	Yongbuwon 2-gil	Danyang County	Daegang-myeon	National Route 5 overlap
Jungnyeong	죽령		Danyang County	Daegang-myeon	National Route 5 overlap Continuation into North Gyeongsang

- Motorway

=== North Gyeongsang Province ===
Name	Hangul name	Connection	Location		Note
Jungnyeong	죽령		Yeongju City	Punggi-eup	National Route 5 overlap North Chungcheong - North Gyeongsang border line
Huibang 3-IS	희방삼거리	Huibangsa	Yeongju City	Punggi-eup	National Route 5 overlap
Sucheol-ri Entrance	수철리입구	Jungnyeong-ro 1513beon-gil Sobaeksan Station	Yeongju City	Punggi-eup	National Route 5 overlap
Sobaeksan Punggi Spa	소백산풍기온천리조트		Yeongju City	Punggi-eup	National Route 5 overlap
Baekri IS	백리교차로	Giju-ro	Yeongju City	Punggi-eup	National Route 5 overlap
Bonghyeon IS	봉현교차로	Prefectural Route 931 (Sobaek-ro) (Hohyeon-ro)	Yeongju City	Bonghyeon-myeon	National Route 5 overlap
Sinjeon IS	신전 교차로	Sinjae-ro; Jangan-ro	Yeongju City	Anjeong-myeon	National Route 5 overlap
Naejul IS	내줄 교차로	Jangan-ro	Yeongju City	Anjeong-myeon	National Route 5 overlap
Gaheung IS	가흥 교차로	National Route 5 (Gyeongbuk-daero); Yeongju-ro	Yeongju City	Gaheung-dong	National Route 5 overlap
Gaheung 3-IS	가흥삼거리	Sinjae-ro	Yeongju City	Gaheung-dong	
Seobu 3-IS	서부삼거리	Banjimi-ro	Yeongju City	Gaheung-dong	
Yeongju Jeil High School Yeongju Girls' Middle School Yeongju Seobu Elementary School Seobu 4-IS	영주제일고등학교 영주여자중학교 영주서부초등학교 서부사거리	Gaheung-ro; Changjin-ro	Yeongju City	Gaheung-dong	
Seocheon Bridge 4-IS	서천교사거리	Hoehyeon-ro	Yeongju City	Yeongju-dong	
Yeongju Overpass	영주육교		Yeongju City	Yeongju-dong	
Yeongju Bus Terminal	영주시외버스터미널	Guseong-ro	Yeongju City	Yeongju-dong	
Yeonggwang Middle School Yeongju Elementary School	영광중학교 영주초등학교		Yeongju City	Yeongju-dong	
(Yeongju City Waterworks Office)	(영주시수도사업부앞)	National Route 28; Prefectural Route 935 (Jungang-ro)	Yeongju City	Yeongju-dong	Prefectural Route 935 overlap
Sangmang-dong Community Center	상망동주민센터		Yeongju City	Sangmang-dong	Prefectural Route 935 overlap
No name	(이름 없음)	Wondang-ro	Yeongju City	Sangmang-dong	Prefectural Route 935 overlap
No name	(이름 없음)	Seowon-ro	Yeongju City	Sangmang-dong	Prefectural Route 935 overlap
Sangmang IS	상망교차로	Prefectural Route 935 (Uisang-ro)	Yeongju City	Sangmang-dong	Prefectural Route 935 overlap
Danun IS	단운교차로	Bonghwa-ro	Yeongju City	Sangmang-dong	
Sinam IS	신암교차로	Sinam-ro	Yeongju City	Isan-myeon	
Isan Bridge	아산교		Yeongju City	Isan-myeon	
Yusan Bridge	유산교		Bonghwa County	Bonghwa-eup	
Bonghwa IS	봉화교차로	Prefectural Route 915 (Yebong-ro)	Bonghwa County	Bonghwa-eup	
Geochon IS	거촌교차로	Geochon-ro	Bonghwa County	Bonghwa-eup	
Geumbong IS	금봉교차로	Prefectural Route 918 (Bongmyeong-ro)	Bonghwa County	Bongseong-myeon	
Changpyeong Tunnel	창평터널		Bonghwa County	Bongseong-myeon	Approximately 350m
Dadeok IS	다덕교차로	Dadeok-ro	Bonghwa County	Bongseong-myeon	
Yongdong IS	용동교차로	Dadeok-ro	Bonghwa County	Beopjeon-myeon	
Beopjeon IS	법전교차로	Beopjeon-ro	Bonghwa County	Beopjeon-myeon	
Beopjeon Station	법전역		Bonghwa County	Beopjeon-myeon	
Soji IS	소지교차로	Hanti-ro	Bonghwa County	Beopjeon-myeon	
Sucheong IS	수청교차로	Hanti-ro	Bonghwa County	Beopjeon-myeon	
Chunyang IS	춘양교차로	Socheon-ro	Bonghwa County	Chunyang-myeon	
Okcheon IS	옥천교차로	National Route 35 (Cheongnyang-ro); Prefectural Route 88 (Socheon-ro)	Bonghwa County	Chunyang-myeon	National Route 35 overlap Prefectural Route 88 overlap
Eoreumal IS	어르말교차로	Socheon-ro	Bonghwa County	Chunyang-myeon	National Route 35 overlap Prefectural Route 88 overlap
Nokdong IS	녹동교차로		Bonghwa County	Chunyang-myeon	National Route 35 overlap Prefectural Route 88 overlap
No name	(이름 없음)	National Route 31; Prefectural Route 88 (Galsan-ro)	Bonghwa County	Chunyang-myeon	National Route 31, 35 overlap Prefectural Route 88 overlap
Norujae Tunnel			Bonghwa County	Chunyang-myeon	National Route 31, 35 overlap Approximately 1690m
Norujae Tunnel			Bonghwa County	Socheon-myeon	
Hyeondong 1 IS	현동1교차로	National Route 31; National Route 35 (Cheongok-ro)	Bonghwa County	Socheon-myeon	National Route 31, 35 overlap
Hyeondong 1 Bridge Hyeondong 2 Bridge	현동제1대교 현동제2대교		Bonghwa County	Socheon-myeon	
Hyeondong 3 IS	현동3교차로	Socheon-ro	Bonghwa County	Socheon-myeon	
Hoe Pass	회고개		Bonghwa County	Socheon-myeon	
Buncheon 3-IS	분천삼거리	Buncheon-gil	Bonghwa County	Socheon-myeon	
Kkochibijae	꼬치비재		Bonghwa County	Socheon-myeon	Elevation 486m
Gwangbi Rest Area	광비정류소		Bonghwa County	Socheon-myeon	
Okbang Bridge	옥방교		Bonghwa County	Socheon-myeon	
No name	(이름 없음)	Prefectural Route 917 (Namhoeryong-ro)	Uljin County	Geumgangsong-myeon	Prefectural Route 917 overlap
Dapunjae	답운재		Uljin County	Geumgangsong-myeon	Prefectural Route 917 overlap Elevation 619.8m
Gwangcheon Bridge	광천교	Prefectural Route 917 (Sibiryeong-ro)	Uljin County	Geumgangsong-myeon	Prefectural Route 917 overlap
Samgun Elementary School Geumgangsong-myeon Office	삼근초등학교 금강송면사무소		Uljin County	Geumgangsong-myeon	
Buryeongsa Valley			Uljin County	Uljin-eup	
Buryeongsa Valley			Uljin County	Geunnam-myeon	
Freshwater Fish Research Center	민물고기연구센터		Uljin County	Geunnam-myeon	
No name	(이름 없음)	Prefectural Route 917 (Uljinbuk-ro)	Uljin County	Geunnam-myeon	Prefectural Route 917 overlap
Susan IS (Uljinnambu IS)	수산 교차로 (울진남부 교차로)	National Route 7 (Donghae-daero); Prefectural Route 917 (Uljinbuk-ro); Chinhwangyeong Expo-ro	Uljin County	Geunnam-myeon	Prefectural Route 917 overlap Terminus

- Motorway
