= National Route 16 (South Korea) =

Road in South Korea

National Route 16
- 국도 제16호선

Route information
- Length: 59.3 km (36.8 mi)
- Existed: 11 July 2025–present

Major junctions
- East end: Gyeongbuk New Airport, Daegu
- West end: Hyeondong-myeon, Cheongsong County

Location
- Country: South Korea

Highway system
- Highway systems of South Korea; Expressways; National; Local
← National Route 15	→ National Route 17

National Route 16 (Korean: 국도 제16호선) is a national highway in South Korea. It connects the planned location of the Daegu-Gyeonbuk New Airport in Daegu and Hyeondong-myeon in Cheongsong County. It was created by upgrading sections of Local Road 68 and portions of Local Road 927 to a national highway.

== History ==
On July 11, 2025, National Highway No. 16 was constructed as the "Gunwi–Cheongsong Line".
