= Local Route 22 (South Korea) =

Road in South Korea

State-Funded Local Highway 22
- 국가지원지방도 제22호선
- Yeosu–Suncheon Line 여수~순천선

Route information
- Length: 43.4 km (27.0 mi)
- Existed: 19 July 1996–present

Major junctions
- From: Hwayang-myeon, Yeosu, South Jeolla; National Route 77
- Namhae Expressway; Suncheon–Wanju Expressway; National Route 2 National Route 17; National Route 77 Local Route 58 Local Route 863
- To: Jangcheon-dong, Suncheon, South Jeolla

Location
- Country: South Korea
- Major cities: Yeosu, Suncheon

Highway system
- Highway systems of South Korea; Expressways; National; Local

Local Route 22 Yeosu–Suncheon Line (Korean: 국가지원지방도 제22호선 여수 ~ 순천선) is a local route of South Korea that connecting Sepo 3-IS in Hwayang-myeon, Yeosu, South Jeolla Province to Sungo 5-IS in Jangcheon-dong, Suncheon, South Jeolla Province.

== History ==
This route was established on 19 July 1996.

- 19 July 1996 : Established Hwajeong-myeon, Yeocheon County – Suncheon segment Local Route 22 Yeocheon – Suncheon Line
- 25 August 2001: Changed the name to Local Route 22 Yeosu – Suncheon Line
- 31 October 2013 : Moved 298m in Anpo-ri, Hwayang-myeon, Yeosu

== Stopovers ==
South Jeolla Province

- Yeosu (Hwayang-myeon - Sora-myeon - Hwajang-dong - Sora-myeon - Yulchon-myeon) - Suncheon (Haeryong-myeon - Jorye-dong - Yeonhyang-dong - Pungdeok-dong - Ocheon-myeon - Deokwol-dong - Namjeong-dong - Inje-dong)

== Major intersections ==
- (■): Motorway

IS: Intersection, IC: Interchange

=== South Jeolla Province ===
Name	Hangul name	Connection	Location		Note
Sepo IS	세포삼거리	National Route 77; Prefectural Route 863 (Jangsu-ro) (Hwayang-ro)	Yeosu City	Hwayang-myeon	Terminus
Anil Elementary School	안일초등학교		Yeosu City	Hwayang-myeon	
Sepo Tunnel	세포터널		Yeosu City	Hwayang-myeon	
Hwadong IS	화동삼거리	Hwadong-ro	Yeosu City	Hwayang-myeon	
Hwayang Argo-Industrial Complex	화양농공단지		Yeosu City	Hwayang-myeon	
Hwayang-myeon Najin-ri IS	화양면나진리 교차로	Prefectural Route 863 (Okcheon-ro)	Yeosu City	Hwayang-myeon	Prefectural Route 863 overlap
(Ungdongma-eul)	(웅동마을)	Sangjeon-gil	Yeosu City	Hwayang-myeon	Prefectural Route 863 overlap
Yeosu Yeomyeong School	여수여명학교		Yeosu City	Sora-myeon	Prefectural Route 863 overlap
Jukrim IS	죽림사거리	Prefectural Route 863 (Seobu-ro)	Yeosu City	Sora-myeon	Prefectural Route 863 overlap
Jukrim Square	죽림광장	Dowon-ro	Yeosu City	Sora-myeon	
No name	(이름 없음)	Jukrim-ro	Yeosu City	Sora-myeon	
No name	(이름 없음)	Hwasan-ro	Yeosu City	Hwajang-dong	
No name	(이름 없음)	Seongsan-ro	Yeosu City	Hwajang-dong	
Gangdoguljae	강도굴재		Yeosu City	Hwajang-dong	
Gangdoguljae			Yeosu City	Sora-myeon	
Yeoyang Middle School Yeoyang High School	여양중학교 여양고등학교		Yeosu City	Sora-myeon	
Deogyang IS	덕양삼거리	Jusamdeogyang-ro	Yeosu City	Sora-myeon	
Sora-myeon Office Sora Elementary School Deogyang Intercity Bus Stop	소라면사무소 소라초등학교 덕양시외버스정류장		Yeosu City	Sora-myeon	
Deogyang IS	덕양 교차로	National Route 17 (Expo-daero)	Yeosu City	Sora-myeon	National Route 17 overlap
Daepo Bridge	대포교		Yeosu City	Sora-myeon	National Route 17 overlap
(2nd Industrial IC)	(제2산단 나들목)	Yeosun-ro	Yeosu City	Sora-myeon	National Route 17 overlap
Singi Bridge	신기교		Yeosu City	Sora-myeon	National Route 17 overlap
Daepo Tunnel	대포터널		Yeosu City	Sora-myeon	National Route 17 overlap Approximately 788m
Daepo Tunnel			Yeosu City	Yulchon-myeon	National Route 17 overlap Approximately 788m
Sangok Bridge	산곡교		Yeosu City	Yulchon-myeon	National Route 17 overlap
Sangok Tunnel	산곡터널		Yeosu City	Yulchon-myeon	National Route 17 overlap Approximately 580m
Chwijeok Bridge	취적교		Yeosu City	Yulchon-myeon	National Route 17 overlap
Chwijeok Tunnel	취적터널		Yeosu City	Yulchon-myeon	National Route 17 overlap Right tunnel: Approximately 490m Left tunnel: Approximately 475m
Yulchon IS	율촌 교차로	Seobu-ro	Yeosu City	Yulchon-myeon	National Route 17 overlap
Yulchon Tunnel	율촌터널		Yeosu City	Yulchon-myeon	National Route 17 overlap Right tunnel: Approximately 510m Left tunnel: Approximately 445m
Yulchon Tunnel			Suncheon City	Haeryong-myeon	National Route 17 overlap Right tunnel: Approximately 510m Left tunnel: Approximately 445m
Dorong IS (Dorong IC)	도롱 교차로 (도롱 나들목)	Namhae Expressway	Suncheon City	Haeryong-myeon	National Route 17 overlap
Haeryong 2 Tunnel	해룡2터널		Suncheon City	Haeryong-myeon	National Route 17 overlap Right tunnel: Approximately 620m Left tunnel: Approximately 630m
Haeryong IS (Haeryong IC)	해룡 교차로 (해룡 나들목)	Namhae Expressway; Yeosun-ro	Suncheon City	Haeryong-myeon	National Route 17 overlap
Maean IS	매안 교차로	Prefectural Route 863 (Haegwang-ro)	Suncheon City	Haeryong-myeon	National Route 17 overlap
Sindae IS	신대 교차로	Woljeon ~ Sepung Motorway; Mupyeong-ro	Suncheon City	Haeryong-myeon	National Route 17 overlap
East Suncheon IC	동순천 나들목	Suncheon–Wanju Expressway	Suncheon City	Haeryong-myeon	National Route 17 overlap
Sangbi IS	상비 교차로	National Route 2 Prefectural Route 58 (Sungwang-ro); National Route 17 (Mupyeong-ro)	Suncheon City	Wangjo-dong	National Route 2, National Route 17 overlap Prefectural Route 58 overlap
No name	(이름 없음)	Jibong-ro	Suncheon City	Wangjo-dong	National Route 2 overlap Prefectural Route 58 overlap
Human Resources Development Service of Korea Jeonnam Branch Suncheon Jorye Elementary School	한국산업인력공단 전남지사 순천조례초등학교		Suncheon City	Wangjo-dong	National Route 2 overlap Prefectural Route 58 overlap
Jorye IS	조례사거리	Baekgang-ro; Isu-ro	Suncheon City	Wangjo-dong	National Route 2 overlap Prefectural Route 58 overlap
Yeonhyang Overpass	연향육교		Suncheon City	Deogyeon-dong	National Route 2 overlap Prefectural Route 58 overlap
Palma IS	팔마사거리	Yeosun-ro; Palma-ro	Suncheon City	Deogyeon-dong	National Route 2 overlap Prefectural Route 58 overlap
Haeryong Bridge	해룡교		Suncheon City	Deogyeon-dong	National Route 2 overlap Prefectural Route 58 overlap
Haeryong Bridge			Suncheon City	Pungdeok-dong	National Route 2 overlap Prefectural Route 58 overlap
Suncheon Lake Garden	순천호수정원		Suncheon City	Pungdeok-dong	National Route 2 overlap Prefectural Route 58 overlap
Dongcheon Bridge	동천교		Suncheon City	Pungdeok-dong	National Route 2 overlap Prefectural Route 58 overlap
Dongcheon Bridge			Suncheon City	Dosa-dong	National Route 2 overlap Prefectural Route 58 overlap
No name	(이름 없음)	Gangbyeon-ro	Suncheon City	Dosa-dong	National Route 2 overlap Prefectural Route 58 overlap
Seomun IS	서문삼거리		Suncheon City	Dosa-dong	National Route 2 overlap Prefectural Route 58 overlap
Hohyeon IS	호현삼거리	National Route 2 Prefectural Route 58 (Noksaek-ro)	Suncheon City	Dosa-dong	National Route 2 overlap Prefectural Route 58 overlap
Deokheung Bridge	덕흥교		Suncheon City	Dosa-dong	
Sinheung IS	신흥삼거리	Namsan-ro	Suncheon City	Namje-dong	
Suncheon Seongnam Elementary School Suncheon High School	순천성남초등학교 순천고등학교		Suncheon City	Namje-dong	
Sungo IS	순고오거리	Isu-ro; Jungang-ro; Palma-ro; Cheongsakeun-gil	Suncheon City	Jangcheon-dong	Terminus

== Road names ==
- Yeosu
  - Sepo 3-IS – Jungnim 4-IS : Hwayang-ro
  - Jungnim 4-IS – Jungnim Gwangjang : Dowon-ro
  - Jungnim Gwangjang – Deogyang IS : Deogyang-ro
  - Deogyang IS – Yulchon Tunnel: Expo-daero
- Suncheon
  - Yulchon Tunnel – Seongsangyo : Expo-daero
  - Seongsangyo – Sindae IS : No name
  - Sindae IS – Sangbi IS : Mupyeong-ro
  - Sangbi IS – Jorye 4-IS : Sungwang-ro
  - Jorye 4-IS – Palma 4-IS : Baekgang-ro
  - Palma 4-IS – Hohyeon 3-IS : Namseungnyong-ro
  - Hohyeon 3-IS – Sungo 5-IS : Useok-ro

== Motorway ==
Deogyang IS – Sangbi IS segment is a motorway, so only car can be driven.
