= Suncheon–Wanju Expressway =

Expressway in South Korea

Expressway No.27
- Suncheon-Wanju Expressway

Route information
- Length: 117.8 km (73.2 mi)
- Existed: 2011–present

Major junctions
- South end: E. Suncheon IC in Suncheon, Jeollanam-do; National Route 17
- North end: Wanju JC in Wanju, Jeollabuk-do; Iksan-Pohang Expressway

Location
- Country: South Korea
- Major cities: Suncheon, Gurye, Namwon, Imsil, Jeonju

Highway system
- Highway systems of South Korea; Expressways; National; Local

- Suncheon–Wanju Expressway
- Hangul: 순천완주고속도로
- Hanja: 順天完州高速道路
- RR: Suncheon Wanju gosok doro
- MR: Sunch'ŏn Wanju kosok toro

The Suncheon–Wanju Expressway (Korean: 순천완주고속도로) is an expressway in South Korea. It connects Suncheon to Wanju.

== List of facilities ==
- IC: Interchange, JC: Junction, SA: Service Area, TG:Tollgate

No.	Name	Korean name	Distance		Connection	Location		Note
	E.Suncheon	동순천기점	-	0.00		South Jeolla Province	Suncheon	
1	E.Suncheon	동순천 나들목	0.51	0.51	National Route 17 (Mupyeong-ro); Local Route 22 (Mupyeong-ro) (Namhae Expressway) (Motorway No. 2)	South Jeolla Province	Suncheon	
TG	E.Suncheon-W.Gwangyang TG	동순천서광양 요금소				South Jeolla Province	Gwangyang	
2	Suncheon JC	순천 분기점	5.12	5.63	Namhae Expressway	South Jeolla Province	Suncheon	
3	Hwangjeon IC	황전 나들목	19.38	25.01	National Route 17 (Seomjingang-ro·Suncheon-ro); National Route 18 (Gurye-ro·Seomjingang-ro)	South Jeolla Province	Suncheon	
SA	Hwangjeon SA	황전휴게소				South Jeolla Province	Suncheon	
4	Gurye-Hwaeomsa IC	구례화엄사 나들목	12.79	37.80	National Route 19 (Saneom-ro)	South Jeolla Province	Gurye County	
SA	Chunhyang SA	춘향휴게소				North Jeolla Province	Namwon	
5	W.Namwon IC	서남원 나들목	14.79	52.59	National Route 17 (Seobu-ro); Jusong-gil	North Jeolla Province	Namwon	
6	Namwon JC	남원 분기점	5.68	58.27	Gwangju–Daegu Expressway	North Jeolla Province	Namwon	
7	N.Namwon IC	북남원 나들목	3.82	62.09	National Route 17 (Seobu-ro); Local Route 745 (Daegoksingye-gil); Daesa-ro	North Jeolla Province	Namwon	
SA	Osu SA	오수휴게소				North Jeolla Province	Imsil County	
8	Osu IC	오수 나들목	13.68	75.77	National Route 17 (Chunhyang-ro)	North Jeolla Province	Imsil County	
9	Imsil IC	임실 나들목	9.80	85.57	National Route 17 (Chunhyang-ro); National Route 30 (Chunhyang-ro·Hoguk-ro)	North Jeolla Province	Imsil County	
SA	Gwanchon SA	관촌휴게소				North Jeolla Province	Imsil County	
10	Sanggwan IC	상관 나들목	17.88	103.45	National Route 17 (Chunhyang-ro)	North Jeolla Province	Wanju County	
10-1	Jeonju JC	전주 분기점			Saemangeum–Pohang Expressway	North Jeolla Province	Jeonju	
11	E.Jeonju IC	동전주 나들목	9.80	113.25	National Route 26 (Jeonjin-ro)	North Jeolla Province	Jeonju	
12	Wanju JC	완주 분기점	4.53	117.78	Iksan–Pohang Expressway	North Jeolla Province	Wanju County	

== See also ==
- Roads and expressways in South Korea
- Transportation in South Korea
