= Saemangeum–Pohang Expressway =

Road in South Korea

Expressway No.20
- Iksan-Pohang Expressway

Route information
- Length: 161 km (100 mi)

Major junctions
- West end: Gimje, Jeollabuk-do
- East end: Pohang, Gyeongsangbuk-do

Location
- Country: South Korea

Highway system
- Highway systems of South Korea; Expressways; National; Local

- Saemangeum–Pohang Expressway
- Hangul: 새만금포항고속도로
- Hanja: 새萬金浦項高速道路
- RR: Saemangeum Pohang gosok doro
- MR: Saeman'gŭm P'ohang kosok toro

The Saemangeum–Pohang Expressway (Korean: 새만금포항고속도로) is an Expressway in South Korea connecting Gimje to Pohang. Numbered 20, it is in two parts, so a complete journey along this route must make use of other roads.

== List of facilities ==
- IC: Interchange, JC: Junction, SA: Service Area, TG:Tollgate

No.	Name	Korean name	Hanja name	Connections	Notes	Location
1	Saemangeum IC			National Route 12; Local Road 702		Gimje, Jeollabuk-do
TG	Saemangeum TG					Gimje, Jeollabuk-do
2	Gimje JC			Seohaean Expressway		Gimje, Jeollabuk-do
SA	Gimje SA					Gimje, Jeollabuk-do
3	N. Gimje IC			National Route 23		Gimje, Jeollabuk-do
4	W. Wanju JC			Honam Expressway		Wanju-gun, Jeollabuk-do
SA	Jeonju SA					Jeonju, Jeollabuk-do
5	S. Jeonju IC			Suncheon–Wanju Expressway; National Route 21		Jeonju, Jeollabuk-do
6	Jeonju IC			Suncheon–Wanju Expressway		Jeonju, Jeollabuk-do
4-1	E. Wanju JC			Saemangeum-Pohang Expressway Branch		Wanju-gun, Jeollabuk-do
SA	Jinan Maisan SA	진안마이산휴게소	鎭安馬耳山休憩所			Jinan-gun, Jeollabuk-do
4	Jinan IC	진안나들목	鎭安나들목	National Route 30		Jinan-gun, Jeollabuk-do
5	Jangsu IC	장수나들목	長水나들목	National Route 19		Jangsu, Jeollabuk-do
6	Jangsu JC	장수분기점	長水分岐點	Tongyeong–Daejeon Expressway		Jangsu, Jeollabuk-do
Muju ~ Palgongsan section is under planning
TG	Palgongsan TG	팔공산나들목	八公山나들목	Palgong-ro		Dong-gu, Daegu
21	Dodong JC	도동분기점	道洞分岐點	Gyeongbu Expressway( AH 1)		Dong-gu, Daegu
SA	Wachon SA	와촌휴게소	瓦村休憩所		Pohang-bound only	Gyeongsan, Gyeongsangbuk-do
22	Cheongtong·Wachon IC	청통·와촌나들목	淸通瓦村나들목	Provincial Route 919		Yeongcheon, Gyeongsangbuk-do
SA	Cheongtong SA	청통휴게소	淸通休憩所		Daegu-bound only	Yeongcheon, Gyeongsangbuk-do
22-1	Hwasan JC	화산분기점	華山分岐點	Sangju-Yeongcheon Expressway		Yeongcheon, Gyeongsangbuk-do
23	N. Yeongcheon IC	북영천나들목	北永川나들목	National Route 35		Yeongcheon, Gyeongsangbuk-do
23-1	Imgo IC			Local Route 69		Yeongcheon, Gyeongsangbuk-do
SA	Yeongcheon SA	영천휴게소	永川休憩所			Yeongcheon, Gyeongsangbuk-do
24	W. Pohang IC	서포항나들목	西浦項나들목	National Route 31		Pohang, Gyeongsangbuk-do
TG	Pohang TG	포항요금소	浦項料金所		Main Tollgate	Pohang, Gyeongsangbuk-do
25	Hakjeon IC	학전나들목	鶴田나들목	National Route 31	Former Expressway's Ending Spot until 2009	Pohang, Gyeongsangbuk-do
26	Pohang IC	포항나들목	浦項나들목	National Route 31		Pohang, Gyeongsangbuk-do
	Pohang	포항 종점	浦項 終點	Huimang-daero		Pohang, Gyeongsangbuk-do

== See also ==
- Roads and expressways in South Korea
- Transportation in South Korea
