= Cheongwon District =

Coordinates: 36.712°N 127.514°E

- Non-autonomous District
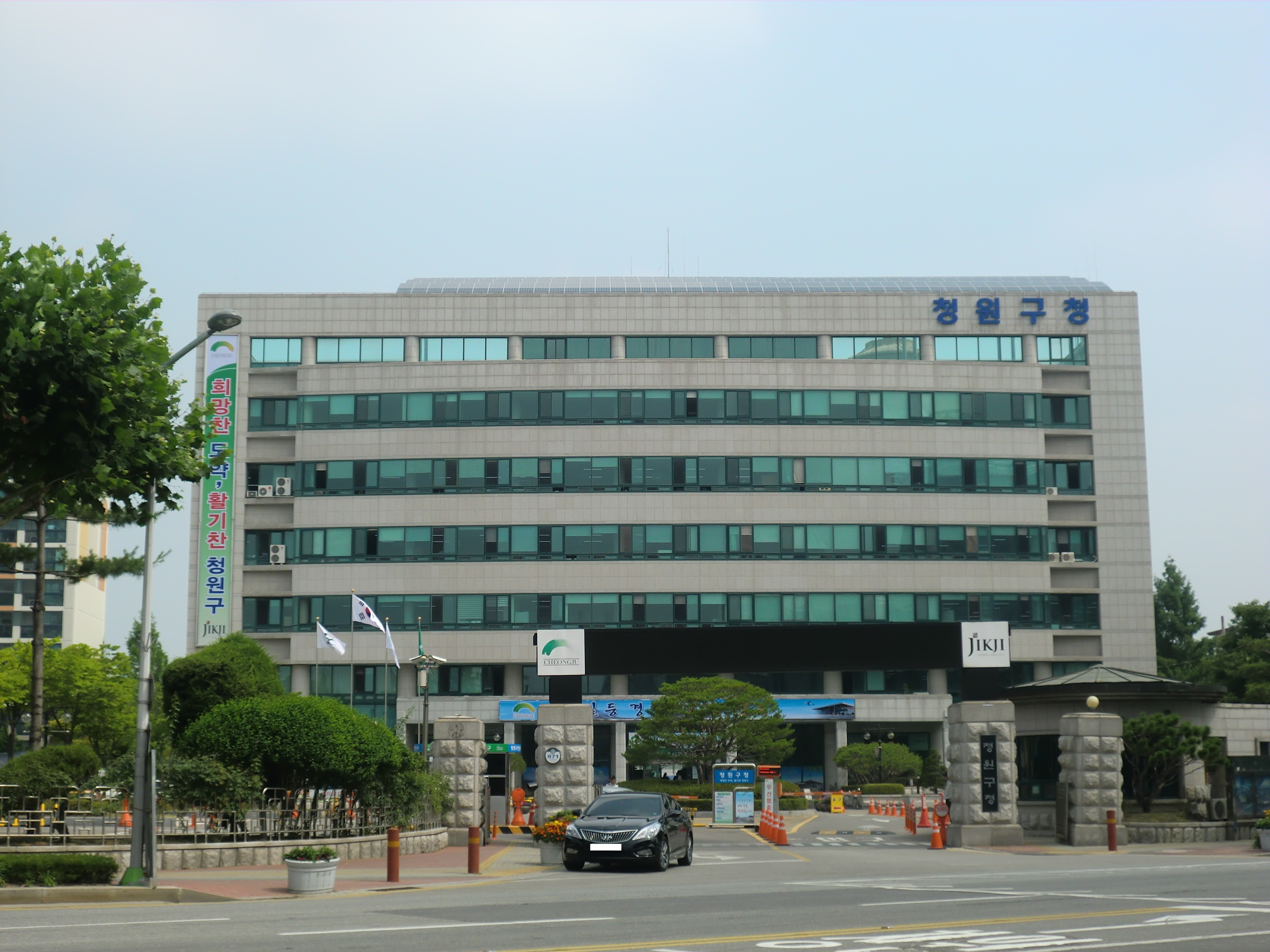
- Cheongwon District office (Former Sangdang District office)
- Interactive map of Cheongwon District
- Country: South Korea
- Region: Hoseo
- Province: North Chungcheong
- City: Cheongju
- Administrative divisions: 2 eup, 1 myeon and 5 dong

Area
  - Total: 214.99 km^{2} (83.01 sq mi)

Population (2014)
  - Total: 166,349
  - Density: 773.75/km^{2} (2,004.0/sq mi)
  - Dialect: Chungcheong
- Website: cheongju.go.kr

Korean name
- Hangul: 청원구
- Hanja: 淸原區
- RR: Cheongwon-gu
- MR: Ch'ŏngwŏn-gu

Cheongwon District (Korean: 청원구) is a non-autonomous district of Cheongju in North Chungcheong Province, South Korea. Cheongwon District was established from a part of Sangdang District and a part of Cheongwon County in July 2014.

== Administrative divisions ==
Cheongwon District is divided into 2 towns (eup), one township (myeon), and 5 neighborhoods (dong).

	Hangul	Hanja
Naesu-eup	내수읍	內秀邑
Ochang-eup	오창읍	梧倉邑
Bugi-myeon	북이면	北二面
Uam-dong	우암동	牛岩洞
Naedeok-dong	내덕1동	內德洞
Naedeok-dong	내덕2동	內德洞
Yuryang-dong; Sacheon-dong	율양사천동	栗陽洞 斜川洞
Ogeunjang-dong	오근장동	梧根場洞
