= Seowon District =

- Non-autonomous District
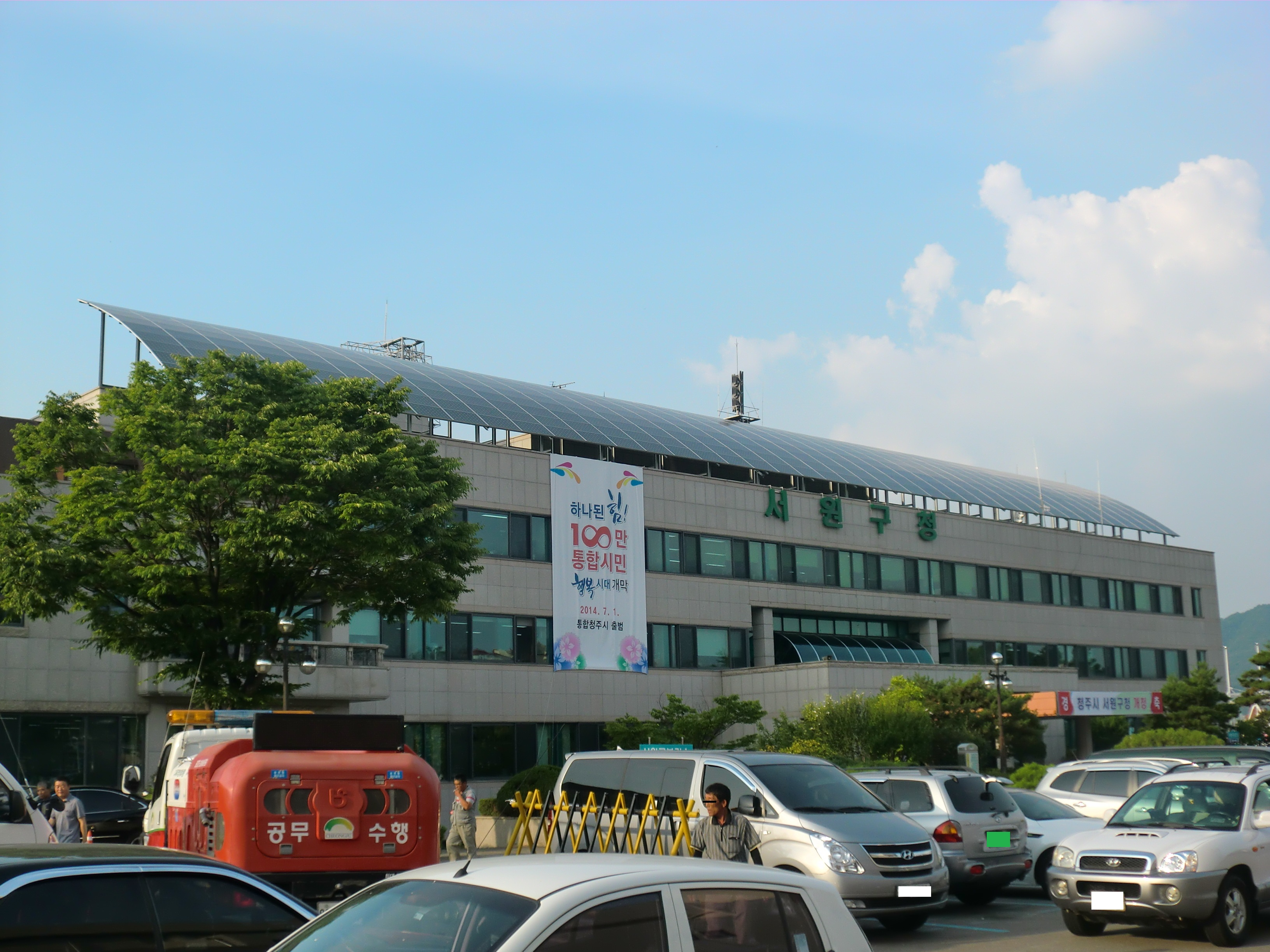
- Seowon-gu office (Former Heungdeok-gu office)
- Country: South Korea
- Region: Hoseo
- Province: North Chungcheong
- City: Cheongju
- Administrative divisions: 2 myeon and 9 dong

Area
  - Total: 122.59 km^{2} (47.33 sq mi)

Population (2014)
  - Total: 227,245
  - Density: 1,853.7/km^{2} (4,801.1/sq mi)
  - Dialect: Chungcheong
- Website: cheongju.go.kr

Korean name
- Hangul: 서원구
- Hanja: 西原區
- RR: Seowon-gu
- MR: Sŏwŏn-gu

Seowon District (Korean: 서원구) is a non-autonomous district of Cheongju, North Chungcheong Province, South Korea. Seowon District was established from a part of Heungdeok District and a part of Cheongwon County in July 2014.

== Administrative divisions ==
Seowon District is divided into 2 townships (myeon) and 9 neighborhoods (dong).

	Hangul	Hanja
Nami-myeon	남이면	南二面
Hyeondo-myeon	현도면	賢都面
Sajik-dong	사직1동	社稷洞
Sajik-dong	사직2동	社稷洞
Sachang-dong	사창동	司倉洞
Mochung-dong	모충동	慕忠洞
Sannam-dong	산남동	山南洞
Bunpyeong-dong	분평동	紛坪洞
Sugok-dong	수곡1동	秀谷洞
Sugok-dong	수곡2동	秀谷洞
Seonghwa-dong; Gaesin-dong; Jungnim-dong	성화개신죽림동	聖化洞 開新洞 竹林洞
