= National Route 25 (South Korea) =

Road in South Korea

National Route 25
- 국도 제25호선

Route information
- Length: 326.0 km (202.6 mi)
- Existed: 31 August 1971–present

Major junctions
- South end: Jinhae District, Changwon
- North end: Cheongwon District, Cheongju

Location
- Country: South Korea

Highway system
- Highway systems of South Korea; Expressways; National; Local
← National Route 24	→ National Route 26

National Route 25 is a national highway in South Korea connecting Changwon to Sangdang District, Cheongju. It was established on 31 August 1971.

== History ==
- August 31, 1971: Became National Route No. 25 Jinhae ~ Cheongju Line by the General National Highway Route Designation Decree.
- November 30, 1972: Due to route improvement, road zone changed from 648m section in Jedong-ri, Daesan-myeon, Changwon-gun to 533m
- October 1, 1975: Total 300m section from Pyeongchon-ri ~ Dusan-ri, Namil-myeon, Cheongwon-gun opened and existing 280m section abolished, Imhan-ri, Tanbu-myeon, Boeun-gun 900m section opened and existing 690m section abolished, total 1.39 km section from Seowon-ri, Naeseo-myeon ~ Sinbong-ri, Hwaseo-myeon, Sangju-gun opened and existing total 1.5 km section abolished
- March 11, 1989: Old road sites in Pyeongchon-ri, Sangnam-myeon, Paseo-ri, Yangdong-ri, Hanam-myeon, Joeum-ri, Yeongeumri, Masan-ri, Sangnam-myeon, Insan-ri, Dugok-ri, Cheongdo-myeon, Heegok-ri, Sanoe-myeon, Milyang-gun area abolished
- January 31, 1998: Imhan-ri, Tanbu-myeon ~ Gwangi-ri, Maro-myeon, Boeun-gun 920m section opened, existing section abolished
- November 26, 1998: Ipyeong-ri, Boeun-eup, Boeun-gun 340m section opened
- May 15, 2000: Songpyeong-ri, Hwabuk-myeon, Boeun-gun 420m section opened and existing 440m section abolished, Sangjang-ri, Tanbu-myeon ~ Hagae-ri, Naesongni-myeon, Boeun-gun 330m section opened, existing 360m section abolished
- November 20, 2000: Hanam ~ Milyang Road (Susan-ri, Hanam-eup ~ Yerim-ri, Sangnam-myeon, Milyang-si) 12 km section partial opening
- December 21, 2000: Daeya-ri ~ Gilsang-ri, Boeun-eup, Boeun-gun 474m section opened and existing 560m section abolished, Geonsong-ri, Jincheon-eup, Jincheon-gun 600m section opened and existing 590m section abolished
- December 31, 2000: Hanam ~ Milyang Road (Yerim-ri, Sangnam-myeon ~ Naei-dong, Milyang-si) 4.55 km section expansion opening, existing Susan-ri, Hanam-eup ~ Yerim-ri, Sangnam-myeon, Milyang-si 12.6 km section abolished
- December 4, 2001: Nucheong-ri, Boeun-eup, Boeun-gun 720m section opened, existing 750m section abolished
- August 15, 2002: Anmin Tunnel (Cheonseon-dong, Changwon-si ~ Seok-dong, Jinhae-si) 2.33 km section opened
- December 2003: Namcheon ~ Gyeongsan section 9.5 km expansion opening.
- December 31, 2003: Nakdong ~ Sangju Road (Gujam-ri ~ Seongdong-ri, Nakdong-myeon, Sangju-si) 7.76 km section expansion opening and existing 9.98 km section abolished
- March 22, 2004: Cheonseon-dong ~ Towol-dong section, Seongsan-gu, Changwon-si 5 km opened.
- May 2004: Samjeongja Intersection ~ Towol Interchange 5.0 km section designated as an automobile-only road
- July 1, 2004: Wollim-ri, Dogae-myeon, Gumi-si ~ Gujam-ri, Nakdong-myeon, Sangju-si 6.4 km section expansion opening
- September 20, 2004: Existing 7.89 km section in Namcheon-myeon, Gyeongsan-si area abolished
- September 25, 2004: Gasan ~ Sangnim Road (Cheonpyeong-ri ~ Songhak-ri, Gasan-myeon, Chilgok-gun) 2.4 km section expansion opening
- November 30, 2004: Part of Sangnim ~ Haepyeong Road (Haepyeong-ri, Haepyeong-myeon, Gumi-si) 880m section expansion opening
- July 15, 2005: Gilsang-ri, Boeun-eup, Boeun-gun 400m section expansion opening
- September 20, 2005: Odong-dong, Sangdang-gu, Cheongju-si ~ Guseong-ri, Naesu-eup, Cheongwon-gun 4.02 km section designated as an automobile-only road
- November 3, 2005: Haepyeong ~ Dogae Road (Silim-ri ~ Wollim-ri, Dogae-myeon, Gumi-si) 7.03 km section expansion opening, existing 7.1 km section abolished
- November 14, 2005: Part of Sangnim ~ Haepyeong Road (Haepyeong-ri, Haepyeong-myeon, Gumi-si) 1.9 km section expansion opening
- November 22, 2005: Gasan ~ Sangnim Road, Sangnim ~ Haepyeong Road, Haepyeong ~ Dogae Road (Cheonpyeong-ri, Gasan-myeon, Chilgok-gun ~ Wollim-ri, Dogae-myeon, Gumi-si) 38.6 km section expansion opening, existing 37.6 km section abolished
- August 22, 2006: Towol Interchange ~ Namsan Interchange 5.8 km section designated as automobile-only road
- April 1, 2008: Songpyeong-ri, Hoein-myeon, Boeun-gun 400m section improvement opening, existing section abolished
- October 23, 2009: Jeongbyeong Tunnel breakthrough ceremony, part of Towol ~ Dong-eup section
- December 16, 2009: Cheongju Bypass Road (Hyochon-ri, Namil-myeon ~ Yangchon-ri, Nami-myeon, Cheongwon-gun) 4.0 km section opened
- January 11, 2010: Mukbang-ri ~ Gukdong-ri, Naesu-eup, Cheongwon-gun 1.35 km section designated as an automobile-only road
- May 12, 2011: Gangsangchon Junction, Suui-dong, Heungdeok-gu ~ Odong Intersection, Odong-dong, Sangdang-gu, Cheongju-si 13.33 km section designated as an automobile-only road
- May 15, 2011: Odong ~ Guseong Road (Odong-dong, Sangdang-gu, Cheongju-si ~ Guseong-ri, Naesu-eup, Cheongwon-gun) 4.19 km section opened
- March 27, 2012: Towol Interchange, Towol-dong, Seongsan-gu ~ Namsan Interchange, Namsan-ri, Dong-eup, Uichang-gu, Changwon-si 5.849 km section temporarily opened
- February 28, 2013: Namcheon ~ Cheongdo Road Section 2 (Wonjeong-ri, Cheongdo-eup ~ Daro-ri, Hwayang-eup, Cheongdo-gun) 8.0 km section expansion opening, existing Songeup-ri, Cheongdo-eup ~ Daro-ri, Hwayang-eup, Cheongdo-gun 5.7 km section abolished
- May 3, 2013: Changwon ~ Gimhae Dong-eup Bypass Road (Namsan Intersection, Deoksan-ri, Dong-eup, Uichang-gu, Changwon-si ~ Deokcheon 2nd Bridge, Yongjam-ri) 800m section expansion opening
- May 20, 2013: Heonsin-dong ~ Buwon-dong section, Sangju-si 6.34 km opened.
- June 30, 2013: Namcheon ~ Cheongdo Road Section 1 (Daro-ri, Hwayang-eup, Cheongdo-gun ~ Heungsan-ri, Namcheon-myeon, Gyeongsan-si) 5.35 km section expansion opening
- August 29, 2013: Due to Namcheon ~ Cheongdo Road Section 1 opening, existing Daro-ri, Hwayang-eup, Cheongdo-gun ~ Heungsan-ri, Namcheon-myeon, Gyeongsan-si 6.21 km section abolished
- October 7, 2013: Yanggok-dong ~ Wanam-dong, Seongsan-gu, Changwon-si 2.908 km section designated as an automobile-only road
- December 26, 2013: Changwon ~ Gimhae Dong-eup Bypass Road (Namsan Interchange, Deoksan-ri, Dong-eup, Uichang-gu, Changwon-si ~ Jinyeong Intersection, Jinyeong-ri, Jinyeong-eup, Gimhae-si) 7.31 km section expansion opening
- February 27, 2014: Dogye-dong, Uichang-gu, Changwon-si ~ Jinyeong-ri, Jinyeong-eup section 11.4 km opened.
- April 7, 2014: Due to Dong-eup Bypass Road opening, existing Deoksan-ri, Dong-eup, Uichang-gu, Changwon-si ~ Jinyeong-ri, Jinyeong-eup, Gimhae-si 7.4 km section abolished
- March 27, 2015: End point changed from Sangdang Four-way Intersection to Seokgyo Six-way Intersection, Sangdang-gu, Cheongju-si
- April 29, 2015: Bukil ~ Namil Road Section 1-1 among Cheongju-si National Highway Alternative Bypass Roads (Guseong-ri ~ Gukdong-ri, Naesu-eup, Cheongwon-gu, Cheongju-si) 1.35 km section newly opened
- January 25, 2016: Cheongju Station Intersection ~ Munam Park Intersection among Cheongju-si National Highway Alternative Bypass Roads (Suui-dong, Heungdeok-gu ~ Jeongsang-dong, Cheongwon-gu, Cheongju-si) 9.85 km section newly opened
- August 31, 2016: Munam Park Intersection ~ Odong Intersection among Cheongju-si National Highway Alternative Bypass Roads (Jeongsang-dong ~ Odong-dong, Cheongwon-gu, Cheongju-si) 3.31 km section newly opened and existing Hyochon-ri, Namil-myeon ~ Sangdang Four-way Intersection Milestone, Sangdang-gu, Cheongju-si 6.2 km section abolished
- February 1, 2021: The 11.74km section from Gukdong Intersection in Gukdong-ri, Naesu-eup, Cheongwon-gu, Cheongju to Hyochon Junction in Hyochon-ri, Namil-myeon, Sangdang-gu was designated as a motorway.
- May 19, 2023: A new 3.4km section of the Cheongju National Road Bypass between Bukil and Namil (from Undong-dong, Sangdang-gu, Cheongju to Hyochon-ri, Namil-myeon) opened.
- August 2, 2024: The starting route in Changwon was changed from Anmin Tunnel to Seokdong Tunnel.
- August 23, 2024: A new 5.6km section of the Namil–Boeun2 Road (from Hupyeong-ri, Suhan-myeon to Nulgok-ri, Hoein-myeon, Boeun County, Chungcheongbuk-do) opened.

== Main stopovers ==
South Gyeongsang Province

- Changwon (Jinhae District - Seongsan District - Uichang District) - Gimhae - Uichang District - Miryang

North Gyeongsang Province

- Cheongdo County - Gyeongsan

Daegu

- Suseong District - Dong District - Buk District - Seo District - Buk District

North Gyeongsang Province

- Chilgok County - Gumi - Uiseong County - Sangju

North Chungcheong Province

- Boeun County - Cheongju (Sangdang District)

== Major intersections ==
- (■): Motorway

IS: Intersection, IC: Interchange

=== South Gyeongsang Province ===
Name	Hangul name	Connection	Location		Note
3rd Square	3호광장	National Route 2 National Route 77 (Jinhae-daero)	Changwon	Jinhae District	Terminus
Anmin Tunnel	안민터널		Changwon	Jinhae District	Approximately 1818m
Anmin Tunnel			Changwon	Seongsan District	Approximately 1818m
Seongjusa IS	성주사 교차로	Prefectural Route 1030 (Namhaean-daero)	Changwon	Seongsan District	
Anmin Tunnel IS (Overpass)	안민터널사거리 (고가차도)	Gongdan-ro	Changwon	Seongsan District	
Samjeongja IS	삼정자 교차로	Prefectural Route 1020 (Changwon-daero)	Changwon	Seongsan District	
Daebang IS	대방 교차로	Daeam-ro; Changi-daero 899beon-gil Changi-daero 901beon-gil Samjeongja-ro 71beon-gil	Changwon	Seongsan District	
Towol IC	토월 나들목	Changi-daero	Changwon	Seongsan District	
Yongju Bridge	용주교		Changwon	Uichang District	
Jeongbyeong Tunnel	정병터널		Changwon	Uichang District	Approximately 2200m
Jeongbyeong Tunnel			Changwon	Dong-eup (Uichang District)	Approximately 2200m
Namsan IC	남산 나들목	National Route 14; Prefectural Route 30	Changwon	Dong-eup (Uichang District)	National Route 14 overlap Prefectural Route 30 overlap
Deoksan IS	덕산 교차로	Uichang-daero	Changwon	Dong-eup (Uichang District)	National Route 14 overlap Prefectural Route 30 overlap
Deokcheon IS	덕천 교차로	Prefectural Route 30 (Dongeup-ro)	Changwon	Dong-eup (Uichang District)	National Route 14 overlap Prefectural Route 30 overlap
Mujeom Tunnel	무점터널		Changwon	Dong-eup (Uichang District)	National Route 14 overlap Approximately 350m
Dongeup IS	동읍 교차로	National Route 14 (Jinsan-daero)	Gimhae City	Jinyeong-eup	National Route 14 overlap
Pungnyeon Bridge	풍년교		Gimhae City	Jinyeong-eup	
Pungnyeon Bridge			Changwon City	Daesan-myeon (Uichang District)	
Gasul IS	가술삼거리	Jinsan-daero 355beon-gil	Changwon City	Daesan-myeon (Uichang District)	
Changwon Daesan High School Changwon Daesan Middle School Gasul Bus Stop Daesan Elementary School	창원대산고등학교 창원대산중학교 가술정류소 대산초등학교		Changwon City	Daesan-myeon (Uichang District)	
Mosan IS	모산삼거리	Mosan-gil	Changwon City	Daesan-myeon (Uichang District)	
Mosan IS	모산사거리	Prefectural Route 60 (Daesanbuk-ro); Mosan-gil	Changwon City	Daesan-myeon (Uichang District)	
Susan Bridge	수산대교		Changwon City	Daesan-myeon (Uichang District)	
Susan Bridge			Miryang City	Hanam-eup	
Susan IS	수산 교차로	Prefectural Route 1008 (Oncheon-ro); Susanjungang-ro; Susanuhoe-ro	Miryang City	Hanam-eup	
Yangdong Overpass	양동육교	Hanam-ro	Miryang City	Hanam-eup	
Paseo Overpass	파서육교	Hanam-ro	Miryang City	Hanam-eup	
Paseo Bridge	파서교		Miryang City	Hanam-eup	
Paseo Bridge			Miryang City	Sangnam-myeon	
Masan Bridge	마산교	Joeum-ro	Miryang City	Sangnam-myeon	
Yeongeum IS	연금 교차로	Sangnam-ro	Miryang City	Sangnam-myeon	
South Miryang IC (South Miryang IC IS)	남밀양 나들목 (남밀양IC 교차로)	Jungang Expressway	Miryang City	Sangnam-myeon	
Yerim IS	예림오거리	Yepyeong-ro; Yerim-gil; Unha-gil	Miryang City	Sangnam-myeon	
Yerim IS	예림사거리	National Route 58 (Gagok 7-gil); Yangnimganjebang-gil	Miryang City	Sangnam-myeon	National Route 58 overlap
Maam Tunnel	마암터널		Miryang City	Sangnam-myeon	National Route 58 overlap Approximately 430m South-bound only
Maam Tunnel			Miryang City	Bubuk-myeon	National Route 58 overlap Approximately 430m South-bound only
Maam IS	마암 교차로	National Route 58 (Sapo-ro)	Miryang City	Bubuk-myeon	National Route 58 overlap
Mirju Bridge	밀주교		Miryang City	Bubuk-myeon	
Mirju Bridge			Miryang City	Sammun-dong	
Sammun-dong Community Center	삼문동주민센터	Miribeol-ro; Sammunjungang-ro	Miryang City	Sammun-dong	
Jugong Apartment	주공아파트앞	Sammun 1-gil	Miryang City	Sammun-dong	
Namcheon Bridge	남천교		Miryang City	Sammun-dong	
National Institute of Crop Science IS	국립식량과학원사거리	Prefectural Route 1080 (Jeompiljae-ro); Yaksan-ro	Miryang City	Naei-dong	
Youngnam General Hospital	영남종합병원	Bukseong-ro	Miryang City	Naei-dong	
Sinchon IS (Changwon District Court Miryang Branch) (Changwon Prosecutors' Office Miryang Branch)	신촌오거리 (창원지방법원 밀양지원) (창원지방검찰청 밀양지청)	National Route 24 (Changmil-ro); Jungang-ro	Miryang City	Naei-dong	National Route 24 overlap
City Hall IS	시청서문사거리	Baekmin-ro; Sicheong-ro	Miryang City	Gyo-dong	National Route 24 overlap
Miryang City Hall	밀양시청		Miryang City	Gyo-dong	National Route 24 overlap
Gyodong IS	교동사거리	Gyodong-ro; Seokjeong-ro	Miryang City	Gyo-dong	National Route 24 overlap
Miryang Park	밀양대공원	Miryangdaegongwon-ro	Miryang City	Gyo-dong	National Route 24 overlap
Gyo-dong Community Center Entrance	교동주민센터입구	Gyodong-ro	Miryang City	Gyo-dong	National Route 24 overlap
Gyodong IS	교동 교차로	Anin-ro; Yongpyeong-ro	Miryang City	Gyo-dong	National Route 24 overlap
Mirsan Bridge	밀산교		Miryang City	Gyo-dong	National Route 24 overlap
Mirsan Bridge			Miryang City	Sanoe-myeon	National Route 24 overlap
Ginneup IS	긴늪사거리	National Route 24 (Miryang-daero)	Miryang City	Sanoe-myeon	National Route 24 overlap
Anin IS	안인삼거리	Anin-ro	Miryang City	Sangdong-myeon	
Sangdong-myeon Office Sangdong Middle School Sangdong Elementary School Sangdong Station Yucheon Bus Terminal	상동면사무소 상동중학교 상동초등학교 상동역 유천버스정류장		Miryang City	Sangdong-myeon	
Singok IS	신곡삼거리	Prefectural Route 1077 (Sangdong-ro)	Miryang City	Sangdong-myeon	
Oksan IS	옥산삼거리	National Route 58 (Oncheon-ro)	Miryang City	Sangdong-myeon	
Yucheon Overpass	유천육교		Miryang City	Sangdong-myeon	Continuation into North Gyeongsang Province

=== North Gyeongsang Province (South Daegu) ===
Name	Hangul name	Connection	Location		Note
Yucheon Overpass	유천육교		Cheongdo County	Cheongdo-eup	South Gyeongsang Province - North Gyeongsang Province border line
No name	(이름 없음)	Prefectural Route 902 (Hanjae-ro)	Cheongdo County	Cheongdo-eup	
Chohyeon Bridge	초현교		Cheongdo County	Cheongdo-eup	
Wondong IS	원동삼거리	Geumho-gil	Cheongdo County	Cheongdo-eup	
Hawolgok IS	월곡삼거리	Cheonghwa-ro	Cheongdo County	Cheongdo-eup	
Cheongdo 2 Bridge	청도2교		Cheongdo County	Cheongdo-eup	
Wonjeong IS	원정사거리	Jungang-ro	Cheongdo County	Cheongdo-eup	
Mogang IS	모강 교차로	National Route 20 (Cheongnyeo-ro)	Cheongdo County	Cheongdo-eup	
Chunghon IS	충혼 교차로		Cheongdo County	Cheongdo-eup	
Cheongdo Police Station	청도경찰서		Cheongdo County	Cheongdo-eup	
Cheongdo IC (Cheongdo IC IS)	청도 나들목 (청도IC 교차로)	Jungang Expressway	Cheongdo County	Cheongdo-eup	
Songeup IS	송읍 교차로	Songeup-gil	Cheongdo County	Cheongdo-eup	
Jinra IS	진라 교차로	Songeup-gil	Cheongdo County	Hwayang-eup	
Samsin 2 Bridge	삼신2교	Namseonghyeon-ro; Iseulmi-ro	Cheongdo County	Hwayang-eup	
Yongam Bridge	용암교	Namseonghyeon-ro; Oncheon-gil	Cheongdo County	Hwayang-eup	
Namseonghyeon IS	남성현 교차로	Namseonghyeon-ro; Samsin-gil	Cheongdo County	Hwayang-eup	
Namseonghyeon Bridge (level crossing)	남성현과선교		Cheongdo County	Hwayang-eup	
Namseonghyeon Tunnel	남성현터널		Cheongdo County	Hwayang-eup	Approximately 1730m
Namseonghyeon Tunnel			Gyeongsan City	Namcheon-myeon	Approximately 1730m
Gorae IS	고래 교차로	Namseonghyeon-ro	Gyeongsan City	Namcheon-myeon	
Namcheon Bridge (level crossing)	남천과선교		Gyeongsan City	Namcheon-myeon	
Geumgok IS	금곡 교차로	Namcheon-ro	Gyeongsan City	Namcheon-myeon	
Samseong IS	삼성 교차로	Samseongyeok-gil	Gyeongsan City	Namcheon-myeon	Connected with Samseong Station
Hyeopseok IS	협석 교차로	Namcheon-ro; Guil-gil	Gyeongsan City	Namcheon-myeon	
Baekcheon IS	백천 교차로	Namseonghyeon-ro	Gyeongsan City	Nambu-dong	
Gyeongsan Joongang Hospital	경산중앙병원		Gyeongsan City	Nambu-dong	
Sangbang IS	상방삼거리	Nammae-ro	Gyeongsan City	Nambu-dong	
Sangbang IS	상방사거리	Gangbyeondong-ro; Seosang-gil	Gyeongsan City	Nambu-dong	
Nambu-dong Community Center Gyeongsan Elementary School	남부동주민센터 경산초등학교		Gyeongsan City	Nambu-dong	
No name	(이름 없음)	Jangsan-ro	Gyeongsan City	Jungang-dong	
Gyeongsan IS	경산오거리	Prefectural Route 919 (Wonhyo-ro); Jungang-ro; Gyeongan-ro 38-gil	Gyeongsan City	Jungang-dong	Prefectural Route 919 overlap
Gyeongsan Intercity Bus Stop	경산시외버스정류장		Gyeongsan City	Jungang-dong	Prefectural Route 919 overlap
Jungbang IS	중방네거리	Jungbang-ro	Gyeongsan City	Jungbang-dong	Prefectural Route 919 overlap
Gyeongsan IS	경산네거리	Prefectural Route 919 (Daehak-ro); Gyeongan-ro	Gyeongsan City	Jungbang-dong	Prefectural Route 919 overlap
Yeongdae Bridge	영대교		Gyeongsan City	Jungbang-dong	
Yeongpyeong Station	정평역		Gyeongsan City	Seobu-dong	
Jungsan IS	중산삼거리	Gyeongsan-ro	Gyeongsan City	Seobu-dong	
Sawol Bridge	사월교		Gyeongsan City	Seobu-dong	Continuation into Daegu

=== Daegu ===
Name	Hangul name	Connection	Location		Note
Sawol Bridge	사월교		Daegu	Suseong District	North Gyeongsang Province - Daegu border line
Sawol Station	사월역		Daegu	Suseong District	
Gosan 1-dong Community Center	고산1동주민센터		Daegu	Suseong District	
Sinmae IS (Sinmae Station)	신매네거리 (신매역)	Gosan-ro	Daegu	Suseong District	
Siji Bridge Daegu Gosan Elementary School (Gosan Station)	시지교 대구고산초등학교 (고산역)		Daegu	Suseong District	
Woldeukeom IS	월드컵삼거리	Woldeukeom-ro	Daegu	Suseong District	Connected with Suseong IC
Daegu Grand Park Station	대공원역		Daegu	Suseong District	
Yeonho IS (Yeonho Station)	연호네거리 (연호역)	Beoman-ro	Daegu	Suseong District	
Air Defense Artillery School	방공포병학교	Dalgubeol-daero 568-gil	Daegu	Suseong District	
Damti Viaduct	담티고가교	Cheongsu-ro	Daegu	Suseong District	
Daeryun Middle School Daeryun High School	대륜중학교 대륜고등학교		Daegu	Suseong District	
Damti Station	담티역		Daegu	Suseong District	
Suseong College IS	수성대학교 교차로	Dalgubeol-daero 528-gil	Daegu	Suseong District	
Daegu Nambu Bus Terminal	대구남부정류장		Daegu	Suseong District	
Manchon IS (Manchon Station)	만촌네거리 (만촌역)	Dalgubeol-daero; Cheongho-ro	Daegu	Suseong District	
Manchon 2-dong Community Center	만촌2동주민센터		Daegu	Suseong District	
Muyeoldae IS	무열대삼거리	Gukchaebosang-ro	Daegu	Suseong District	
Manchon 1-dong Community Center	만촌1동주민센터	Gomo-ro	Daegu	Suseong District	
Hyomok IS (Hyomok IS Underpass)	효목네거리 (효목네거리지하차도)	National Route 4 (Hwarang-ro)	Daegu	Dong District	National Route 4 overlap
(Hyomok Underpass)	(효목지하차도)	Dongbu-ro	Daegu	Dong District	National Route 4 overlap
Keungogae IS (Hyomok Overpass)	큰고개오거리 (효목고가차도)	Sinamnam-ro; Ayang-ro	Daegu	Dong District	National Route 4 overlap
Bokhyeon IS	복현네거리	Gyeongdae-ro; Bokhyeon-ro	Daegu	Buk District	National Route 4 overlap
Bokhyeon IS (Bokhyeon IS)	복현오거리 (복현오거리)	Geomdan-ro; Gonghang-ro; Daehak-ro	Daegu	Buk District	National Route 4 overlap
Sangyeok Middle School IS	산격중학교 교차로	Sangyeok-ro	Daegu	Buk District	National Route 4 overlap
No name	(이름 없음)	Hoguk-ro	Daegu	Buk District	National Route 4 overlap
Yeonam IS	연암네거리	Yeonam-ro	Daegu	Buk District	National Route 4 overlap
Chimsan Bridge IS	침산교 교차로	Sincheondong-ro	Daegu	Buk District	National Route 4 overlap
(Chimsan Bridge Underpass)	(침산교지하차도)	Sincheon-daero	Daegu	Buk District	National Route 4 overlap
Baeksabeol IS	백사벌네거리	Chimsan-ro	Daegu	Buk District	National Route 4 overlap
Nowon IS	노원네거리	Obong-ro	Daegu	Buk District	National Route 4 overlap
Manpyeong IS (Seodaegu Express Bus Terminal) (Manpyeong Station)	만평네거리 (서대구고속버스터미널) (만평역)	National Route 5 (Seodaegu-ro); Paldal-ro	Daegu	Seo District	National Route 4, National Route 5 overlap
Gongdan Station	공단역		Daegu	Seo District	National Route 4, National Route 5 overlap
Paldal Bridge IS	팔달교 교차로	Sincheon-daero	Daegu	Seo District	National Route 4, National Route 5 overlap
Paldal Bridge	팔달교		Daegu	Seo District	National Route 4, National Route 5 overlap
Paldal Bridge			Daegu	Buk District	National Route 4, National Route 5 overlap
North Daegu Freight Terminal	대구북부화물터미널		Daegu	Buk District	National Route 4, National Route 5 overlap
Paldalro IS (Paldal Overpass) (Maecheon Market Station)	팔달로 교차로 (팔달고가차도) (매천시장역)	Maecheon-ro 18-gil	Daegu	Buk District	National Route 4, National Route 5 overlap
Taejeon Station	태전역		Daegu	Buk District	National Route 4, National Route 5 overlap
Taejeon IS	태전삼거리	National Route 4 (Taejeon-ro)	Daegu	Buk District	National Route 4, National Route 5 overlap
Driver's License Test Center	운전면허시험장	Taeamnam-ro; Chilgokjungang-daero 65-gil	Daegu	Buk District	National Route 5 overlap
Taegu Science University IS	대구과학대학 교차로	Taeam-ro	Daegu	Buk District	National Route 5 overlap
Chilgok IS (Chilgok Underpass)	칠곡네거리 (칠곡지하차도)	Guam-ro	Daegu	Buk District	National Route 5 overlap Connected with Chilgok IC
Catholic University of Daegu Chilgok Catholic Medical Center	대구가톨릭대학교 칠곡가톨릭병원		Daegu	Buk District	National Route 5 overlap Continuation into North Gyeongsang Province
Chilgok Elementary School IS	칠곡초등학교 교차로	Gwaneumjungang-ro	Daegu	Buk District	National Route 5 overlap Continuation into North Gyeongsang Province
Eupnae-dong Community Center	읍내동주민센터		Daegu	Buk District	National Route 5 overlap Continuation into North Gyeongsang Province
Chilgok Post Office IS	칠곡우체국 교차로	Dongam-ro; Chilgokjungang-daero 115-gil	Daegu	Buk District	National Route 5 overlap Continuation into North Gyeongsang Province
Chilgok Middle School	칠곡중학교		Daegu	Buk District	National Route 5 overlap Continuation into North Gyeongsang Province
No name	(이름 없음)	Hoguk-ro	Daegu	Buk District	National Route 5 overlap Continuation into North Gyeongsang Province
Dongho Police Station	동호치안센터		Daegu	Buk District	National Route 5 overlap Continuation into North Gyeongsang Province

=== North Gyeongsang Province (North Daegu) ===
Name	Hangul name	Connection	Location		Note
Gangbuk Gas Station	강북주유소		Chilgok County	Dongmyeong-myeon	Daegu - North Gyeongsang Province border line National Route 5 overlap
Dongmyeong IS	동명사거리	Prefectural Route 79 (Hanti-ro); Geumam 2-gil	Chilgok County	Dongmyeong-myeon	National Route 5 overlap Prefectural Route 79 overlap
No name	(이름 없음)	Geumamjungang-gil	Chilgok County	Dongmyeong-myeon	National Route 5 overlap Prefectural Route 79 overlap
No name	(이름 없음)	Namwon-ro	Chilgok County	Dongmyeong-myeon	National Route 5 overlap Prefectural Route 79 overlap
Soya Pass	소야고개		Chilgok County	Dongmyeong-myeon	National Route 5 overlap Prefectural Route 79 overlap
Soya Pass			Chilgok County	Gasan-myeon	National Route 5 overlap Prefectural Route 79 overlap
Dabuwon	다부원앞	Prefectural Route 79; Prefectural Route 923 (Dabuwon 1-gil)	Chilgok County	Gasan-myeon	National Route 5 overlap Prefectural Route 79, 923 overlap
Dabudong Monument Gasan Elementary School Gasan-myeon Office	다부동전승비 가산초등학교 가산면사무소		Chilgok County	Gasan-myeon	National Route 5 overlap Prefectural Route 923 overlap
Cheonpyeong IS	천평삼거리	National Route 5 (Gyeongbuk-daero)	Chilgok County	Gasan-myeon	National Route 5 overlap Prefectural Route 923 overlap
Gasan IC	가산 나들목	Jungang Expressway	Chilgok County	Gasan-myeon	Prefectural Route 923 overlap
Hapan 1 Bridge	하판1교	Songsin-ro	Chilgok County	Gasan-myeon	Prefectural Route 923 overlap
Songhak IS	송학 교차로	Prefectural Route 514 (Indonggasan-ro)	Chilgok County	Gasan-myeon	Prefectural Route 923 overlap
Sinjang IS	신장 교차로	Sinjang 4-gil	Chilgok County	Gasan-myeon	Prefectural Route 923 overlap
Sinjang IS		Sinjang 4-gil	Gumi City	Jangcheon-myeon	Prefectural Route 923 overlap
Hajang 2 Bridge	하장2교	National Route 67; Prefectural Route 923 (Hajang 3-gil); Sanho-daero	Gumi City	Jangcheon-myeon	National Route 67 overlap Prefectural Route 923 overlap
Yongmun IS	용문 교차로	Imcheonindeok-ro	Gumi City	Sandong-myeon	National Route 67 overlap
Sandong IS	산동 교차로	Gangdong-ro	Gumi City	Sandong-myeon	National Route 67 overlap
Seongsu Bridge	성수교		Gumi City	Sandong-myeon	National Route 67 overlap
Goegok IS	괴곡 교차로	National Route 67 (Okgye 2gongdan-ro)	Gumi City	Sandong-myeon	National Route 67 overlap
Munryang IS	문량 교차로	Seongsumullyang-gil	Gumi City	Haepyeong-myeon	
Seupmun Bridge	습문교		Gumi City	Haepyeong-myeon	
Haepyeong IS	해평 교차로	Prefectural Route 927 (Sungseon-ro)	Gumi City	Haepyeong-myeon	
Gilsu IS	길수 교차로	Prefectural Route 927 (Sungseon-ro)	Gumi City	Haepyeong-myeon	
Dorisa IS	도리사 교차로	Gangdong-ro	Gumi City	Haepyeong-myeon	
Sungam Bridge	숭암교		Gumi City	Haepyeong-myeon	
Wolgok IS	월곡 교차로	Gangdong-ro	Gumi City	Haepyeong-myeon	
Ilseon IS	일선 교차로	Gangdong-ro	Gumi City	Dogae-myeon	
Dogae IS	도개 교차로	National Route 33; Prefectural Route 68 (Seonsan-daero)	Gumi City	Dogae-myeon	
(Gunggi IS)	(궁기 교차로)	Doan-ro	Gumi City	Dogae-myeon	
Singok Bridge	신곡교		Gumi City	Dogae-myeon	
Dogae IC	도개 나들목	Sangju-Yeongcheon Expressway	Gumi City	Dogae-myeon	Under construction
Gasan IS	가산 교차로	Yongsangasan-gil	Gumi City	Dogae-myeon	
Nakjeong Bridge	낙정교		Uiseong County	Danmil-myeon	
Nakdong Bridge	낙단대교		Uiseong County	Danmil-myeon	
Nakdong Bridge			Sangju City	Nakdong-myeon	
Nakdan IS	낙단 교차로	National Route 59; Prefectural Route 912 (Seonsangdong-ro)	Sangju City	Nakdong-myeon	
Gujam IS	구잠 교차로	Nakun-ro	Sangju City	Nakdong-myeon	
East Sangju IC	동상주 나들목	Dangjin-Yeongdeok Expressway	Sangju City	Nakdong-myeon	
Nakdong Pass	낙동고개		Sangju City	Nakdong-myeon	
Gusan Bridge	구산교	Yeongnamjeil-ro	Sangju City	Nakdong-myeon	
Bunhwang 1 Bridge	분황1교	Bunhwang 1-gil	Sangju City	Nakdong-myeon	
Sinsang IS	신상 교차로	Deokam-ro	Sangju City	Nakdong-myeon	
Heonsin IS	헌신 교차로	Yeongnamjeil-ro	Sangju City	Dongmun-dong	Connected with Sangju IC
Oedap Overpass	외답육교	Gyeongcheon-ro	Sangju City	Dongmun-dong	
Byeongseoncheon Bridge	병선천교		Sangju City	Dongmun-dong	
Hwasan Overpass	화산육교	Prefectural Route 916 (Arirang-ro)	Sangju City	Gyerim-dong	
Chosan Overpass	초산육교	National Route 3 (Gyeongsang-daero)	Sangju City	Bungmun-dong	National Route 3 overlap
Jukjeon IS	죽전 교차로	Buksangju-ro	Sangju City	Bungmun-dong	National Route 3 overlap
Mansan IS	만산삼거리	Buksangju-ro	Sangju City	Bungmun-dong	National Route 3 overlap
Mansan IS	만산사거리	Mansan 7-gil	Sangju City	Bungmun-dong	National Route 3 overlap
Sangju Tax Office e-mart Sangju	상주세무서 이마트 상주점		Sangju City	Bungmun-dong	National Route 3 overlap
Bukcheon Bridge IS (Sangju Bukcheon Battleground)	북천교북측삼거리 (상주 임란북천전적지)	Bukcheon-ro	Sangju City	Bungmun-dong	National Route 3 overlap
Bukcheon Bridge	북천교		Sangju City	Bungmun-dong	National Route 3 overlap
Bukcheon Bridge IS	북천교 교차로	National Route 3 (Gyeongsang-daero); Yeongnamjeil-ro	Sangju City	Bungmun-dong	National Route 3 overlap
Yeonwon 1 Bridge	연원1교		Sangju City	Bungmun-dong	
Yeonwon 1 Bridge			Sangju City	Namwon-dong	
No name	(이름 없음)	Jungang-ro	Sangju City	Namwon-dong	
Seopo Bridge	서보교		Sangju City	Namwon-dong	
Naeseo IS	내서삼거리	Prefectural Route 901 (Sinchon 2-gil)	Sangju City	Naeseo-myeon	Prefectural Route 901 overlap
No name	(이름 없음)	Prefectural Route 901 (Baekhwa-ro); Nakseo 1-gil	Sangju City	Naeseo-myeon	Prefectural Route 901 overlap
No name	(이름 없음)	Eosan-ro	Sangju City	Naeseo-myeon	
No name	(이름 없음)	Nakseo 1-gil	Sangju City	Naeseo-myeon	
Nakseo Elementary School Naeseo Junior High School Seowon Health Clinic	낙서초등학교 내서중학교 서원보건진료소		Sangju City	Naeseo-myeon	
Hasong IS	하송삼거리	Munjang-ro	Sangju City	Hwaseo-myeon	
Hwaryeong	화령		Sangju City	Hwaseo-myeon	Elevation 320m
Sucheonggeori IS	수청거리삼거리	Prefectural Route 49 (Sanggok-ro)	Sangju City	Hwaseo-myeon	Prefectural Route 49 overlap
Hwaseo IC	화서 나들목	Dangjin-Yeongdeok Expressway	Sangju City	Hwaseo-myeon	Prefectural Route 49 overlap
Sinbong IS	신봉네거리	Prefectural Route 49 (Junghwa-ro)	Sangju City	Hwaseo-myeon	Prefectural Route 49 overlap
Hwanam Health Clinic	화남보건지소		Sangju City	Hwanam-myeon	
Pyeongon-ri	평온리		Sangju City	Hwanam-myeon	Continuation into North Chungcheong Province

=== North Chungcheong Province ===
Name	Hangul name	Connection	Location		Note
Jeokam-ri	적암리		Boeun County	Maro-myeon	North Gyeongsang Province - North Chungcheong Province border line
Songhyeon IS	송현삼거리	Gwangisonghyeon-ro	Boeun County	Maro-myeon	
Gwangi IS	관기 교차로	Prefectural Route 505 (Cheongsangwangi-ro) (Gwangi 3-gil)	Boeun County	Maro-myeon	
Tanbu 2 Bridge	탄부2교		Boeun County	Maro-myeon	
Tanbu 2 Bridge			Boeun County	Tanbu-myeon	
Tanbu IS	탄부 교차로	Prefectural Route 502; Prefectural Route 505 (Gwangisonghyeon-ro) (Samseungtanbu-ro)	Boeun County	Tanbu-myeon	Prefectural Route 505 overlap
Sangjang IS	상장삼거리	Pyeonggaksangjang-ro	Boeun County	Tanbu-myeon	Prefectural Route 505 overlap
Songnisan IC (Sangjang IS)	속리산 나들목 (상장 교차로)	Dangjin-Yeongdeok Expressway	Boeun County	Tanbu-myeon	Prefectural Route 505 overlap
Hwanggok Bridge	황곡교		Boeun County	Tanbu-myeon	Prefectural Route 505 overlap
Hwanggok Bridge			Boeun County	Jangan-myeon	Prefectural Route 505 overlap
Jangnae IS	장내삼거리	Prefectural Route 505 (Jangan-ro); Hwanggok-gil	Boeun County	Jangan-myeon	Prefectural Route 505 overlap
Guin IS	구인삼거리	Jangjae-ro	Boeun County	Jangan-myeon	
Agriculture Complex IS	농공단지삼거리	Maehwaguin-ro	Boeun County	Jangan-myeon	
Fun Park	펀파크		Boeun County	Boeun-eup	
Malti IS	말티삼거리	Songnisan-ro; Nucheong 1-gil	Boeun County	Boeun-eup	
Nucheong IS	누청삼거리	National Route 37 (Donghak-ro)	Boeun County	Boeun-eup	National Route 37 overlap
Boeun IS	보은 교차로	National Route 19 (Boeunmiwon-ro)	Boeun County	Boeun-eup	National Route 37 overlap
Guncheong IS	군청사거리	Guncheong-gil; Marudeul-gil	Boeun County	Boeun-eup	National Route 37 overlap
Ipyeong IS	이평삼거리	Baetdeul-ro	Boeun County	Boeun-eup	National Route 37 overlap
Ipyeong Bridge IS	이평교사거리	Nambu-ro	Boeun County	Boeun-eup	National Route 37 overlap
Gyosa IS	교사사거리	Boeun-ro	Boeun County	Boeun-eup	National Route 37 overlap
KT Corporation Boeun Office	KT 보은지사		Boeun County	Boeun-eup	National Route 37 overlap
Jangsin IS	장신사거리	Samsanjebang-ro; Jangsokjungcho-ro	Boeun County	Boeun-eup	National Route 37 overlap
Jangsin Bridge	장신교		Boeun County	Boeun-eup	National Route 37 overlap
Jangsin Bridge			Boeun County	Suhan-myeon	National Route 37 overlap
Hupyeong IS	후평사거리	National Route 37 (Annaeboeun-ro)	Boeun County	Suhan-myeon	National Route 37 overlap
Gyoam IS	교암삼거리	Geohyeongyoam-ro	Boeun County	Suhan-myeon	
Bocheong Bridge	보청교		Boeun County	Suhan-myeon	
Dongjeong IS	동정삼거리	Prefectural Route 575 (Annaesuhan-ro)	Boeun County	Suhan-myeon	Prefectural Route 575 overlap
Chajeong IS	차정사거리	Prefectural Route 575 (Sancheoksanggung-ro); Yongchonchajeong-ro	Boeun County	Suhan-myeon	Prefectural Route 575 overlap
Suritijae	수리티재		Boeun County	Suhan-myeon	Elevation 321m
Suritijae			Boeun County	Hoein-myeon	Elevation 321m
Geoncheon IS	건천삼거리	Aegok-ro	Boeun County	Hoein-myeon	
Hoein IC (Songpyeong IS)	회인 나들목 (송평사거리)	Dangjin-Yeongdeok Expressway	Boeun County	Hoein-myeon	
Nulgok IS	눌곡삼거리	Prefectural Route 571 (Hoenam-ro)	Boeun County	Hoein-myeon	Prefectural Route 571 overlap
Hoein Bus Terminal Hoein Middle School Hoein-myeon Office	회인버스공동정류소 회인중학교 회인면사무소		Boeun County	Hoein-myeon	Prefectural Route 571 overlap
Goseok IS	고석삼거리	Prefectural Route 571 (Hoeinnaebuk-ro)	Boeun County	Hoein-myeon	Prefectural Route 571 overlap
Pibanryeong	피반령		Boeun County	Hoein-myeon	Elevation 360m
Pibanryeong			Cheongju City	Sangdang District Gadeok-myeon	Elevation 360m
Incha IS	인차삼거리	Prefectural Route 509 (Inchasidong-ro)	Cheongju City	Sangdang District Gadeok-myeon	Prefectural Route 509 overlap
Gadeok-myeon Office	가덕면사무소		Cheongju City	Sangdang District Gadeok-myeon	Prefectural Route 509 overlap
Incha IS	인차삼거리	Prefectural Route 509 (Sangjangincha-ro)	Cheongju City	Sangdang District Gadeok-myeon	Prefectural Route 509 overlap
Incha Bridge	인차교		Cheongju City	Sangdang District Gadeok-myeon	
Incha Bridge			Cheongju City	Sangdang District Namil-myeon	
Dusan IS	두산삼거리	Prefectural Route 32 (Danjae-ro)	Cheongju City	Sangdang District Namil-myeon	Prefectural Route 32 overlap
Goeun IS	고은삼거리	Goeundusan-ro	Cheongju City	Sangdang District Namil-myeon	Prefectural Route 32 overlap
Goeun IS	고은사거리	Prefectural Route 32 (Micheongoeun-ro); Goeundusan-ro	Cheongju City	Sangdang District Namil-myeon	Prefectural Route 32 overlap
Korea Air Force Academy Namil Elementary School	공군사관학교 남일초등학교		Cheongju City	Sangdang District Namil-myeon	
Hyochon Branch	효촌 분기점	3sunhwan-ro	Cheongju City	Sangdang District Namil-myeon	
Hyochon IS	효촌삼거리	Sinsonghyochon-ro	Cheongju City	Sangdang District Namil-myeon	
Namil-myeon Office Cheongwon County Public Health Center Cheongwon County Agricultural Technology Center	남일면사무소 청원군보건소 청원군농업기술센터		Cheongju City	Sangdang District Namil-myeon	
Jibuk IS	지북 교차로	2sunhwan-ro Mokryeon-ro	Cheongju City	Sangdang District	
Bangseo IS	방서사거리	1sunhwan-ro	Cheongju City	Sangdang District	
Yongam IS	용암사거리	Wolpyeong-ro	Cheongju City	Sangdang District	
Yeongun IS	영운사거리	Suyeong-ro	Cheongju City	Sangdang District	
Yeongun-dong Community Center Cheongnam Elementary School	영운동주민센터 청남초등학교		Cheongju City	Sangdang District	
Geumseok IS	금석교사거리	Sanseong-ro; Musimdong-ro	Cheongju City	Sangdang District	
Seokgyo IS	석교육거리	National Route 17; Prefectural Route 96 (Cheongnam-ro); Yeongun-ro; Sangdang-ro 1beon-gil Sangdang-ro 3beon-gil Sangdang-ro 5beon-gil	Cheongju City	Sangdang District	Terminus
