= National Route 67 (South Korea) =

Road in South Korea

National Route 67
- Chilgok-Gunwi Line 국도 제67호선

Route information
- Length: 40.5 km (25.2 mi)
- Existed: 1 July 1996–present

Major junctions
- South end: Chilgok County, North Gyeongsang Province
- North end: Gunwi County, North Gyeongsang Province

Location
- Country: South Korea

Highway system
- Highway systems of South Korea; Expressways; National; Local

National Route 67 is a national highway in South Korea which connects Chilgok County to Gunwi County. It was established on 1 July 1996.

== Main stopovers ==
North Gyeongsang Province

- Chilgok County - Gumi - Gunwi County

== Major intersections ==
- (■): Motorway

IS: Intersection, IC: Interchange

=== North Gyeongsang Province ===
Name	Hangul name	Connection	Location		Note
Connected with Prefectural Route 67
Waegwan IS	왜관 교차로	Gwanmun-ro	Chilgok County	Waegwan-eup	Terminus
Unnamed bridge	(교량 이름 미상)		Chilgok County	Waegwan-eup	
Chilgokbo Jwaan	칠곡보 좌안		Chilgok County	Seokjeok-eup	
Jungji IS	중지 교차로	Seokjeok-ro	Chilgok County	Seokjeok-eup	
Jungji Bridge	중지교		Chilgok County	Seokjeok-eup	
Ponam 1 IS	포남1 교차로	Seokjeok-ro	Chilgok County	Seokjeok-eup	
Ponam 2 IS	포남2 교차로	Ponam 2-gil	Chilgok County	Seokjeok-eup	
Seokjeok IS	석적 교차로	Seokjeok-ro; Pomang-ro	Chilgok County	Seokjeok-eup	
Namyul IS	남율 교차로	Namyul-ro	Chilgok County	Seokjeok-eup	
Ubang 1 IS Ubang 2 IS	우방1 교차로 우방2 교차로		Chilgok County	Seokjeok-eup	
Jungri Entrance	중리입구	Yuhak-ro	Chilgok County	Seokjeok-eup	
No name	(이름 없음)	3gongdan-ro	Gumi City	Jinmi-dong	
Gumi 3 Complex	구미3공단		Gumi City	Jinmi-dong	
No name	(이름 없음)	Prefectural Route 514 (Suchul-daero)	Gumi City	Jinmi-dong	Prefectural Route 514 overlap
Indong Square	인동광장	Prefectural Route 514 (Samil-ro); Suchul-daero	Gumi City	Indong-dong	Prefectural Route 514 overlap
Gumi Cheokhwabi	구미척화비		Gumi City	Yangpo-dong	
Gumi 2 Complex	구미2공단		Gumi City	Yangpo-dong	
Gupo Bridge	구포교		Gumi City	Yangpo-dong	
No name	(이름 없음)	Sanho-daero	Gumi City	Yangpo-dong	
Okgye Daebaek Town Entrance	옥계대백타운입구	Heungan-ro	Gumi City	Yangpo-dong	
Seongsu IS	성수 교차로	Seongnim-gil	Gumi City	Sandong-myeon	
Seongsu Bridge	성수교		Gumi City	Sandong-myeon	
Goegok IS	괴곡 교차로	National Route 25 (Nakdong-daero)	Gumi City	Sandong-myeon	National Route 25 overlap
Seongsu Bridge	성수교		Gumi City	Sandong-myeon	National Route 25 overlap
Sandong IS	산동 교차로	Gangdong-ro	Gumi City	Sandong-myeon	National Route 25 overlap
Yongmun IS	용문 교차로	Imcheonindeok-ro	Gumi City	Sandong-myeon	National Route 25 overlap
Hajang 2 Bridge	하장2교	National Route 25; Prefectural Route 923 (Nakdong-daero)	Gumi City	Jangcheon-myeon	National Route 25 overlap Prefectural Route 923 overlap
Hajang IS	하장삼거리	Gangdong-ro	Gumi City	Jangcheon-myeon	Prefectural Route 923 overlap
Sangnim IS	상림삼거리	Prefectural Route 923 (Gangdong-ro)	Gumi City	Jangcheon-myeon	Prefectural Route 923 overlap
No name	(이름 없음)	Prefectural Route 923 (Songbaek-ro)	Gumi City	Jangcheon-myeon	Prefectural Route 923 overlap
Suseo Bridge	수서교		Gunwi County	Gunwi-eup	
Gunwi IC (Gunwi IC IS)	군위 나들목 (군위IC 교차로)	Jungang Expressway; National Route 5 (Gyeongbuk-daero)	Gunwi County	Gunwi-eup	Terminus
