= Jungnyeong Tunnel =

Tunnel in South Korea

Coordinates: 36.9028°N 128.4337°E

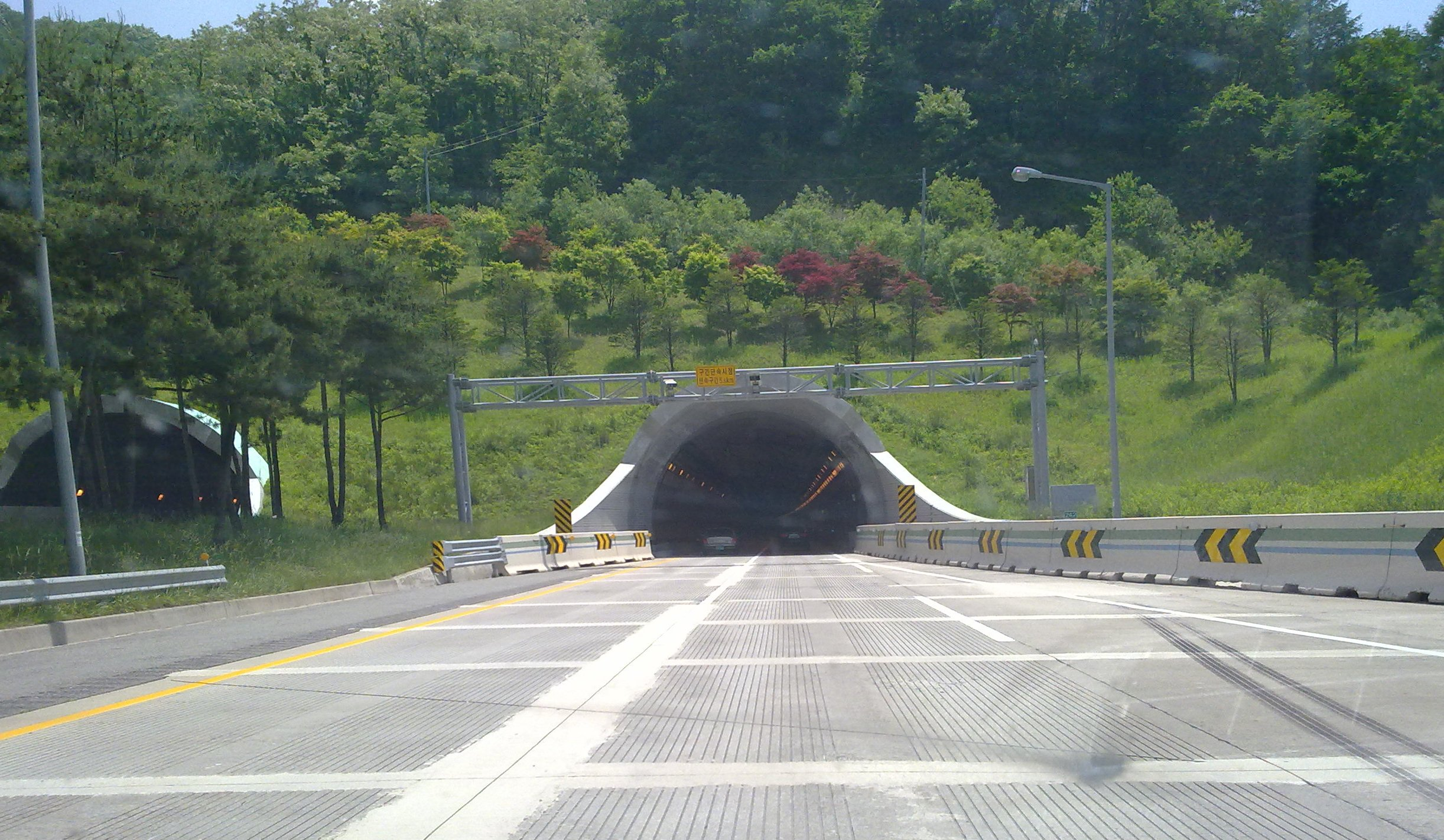

Korean name
- Hangul: 죽령터널
- Hanja: 竹嶺터널
- RR: Jungnyeong teoneol
- MR: Chungnyŏng t'ŏnŏl

Jungnyeong Tunnel, (also spelled Jukryeong Tunnel or Jungryeong Tunnel), is one of Korea's longest tunnels with a length of 4.6 kilometers. This tunnel carries the Jungang Expressway, an expressway running through central South Korea. It connects Yeongju City with Danyang County. It was opened by the National Highway Corporation.
