= 中央高速 =

中央高速 may refer to:

- Central Expressway, Singapore (中央高速公路), an expressway in Singapore
- Chūō Expressway (中央自動車道), an expressway in Japan
- Jungang Expressway (中央高速道路), an expressway in South Korea
