= Gwanmun-daero =

Gwanmun-daero (Busan City Expressway No.3 and Busan Metropolitan City Line No.33) is the city expressway located in Busan, South Korea. The road opened on December 10, 2001, connecting Busan Harbor Part 5 ~ Sujeong Tunnel ~ Gaya Viaduct ~ Busanjin-gu Danggam-dong ~ Baekyang Tunnel ~ Mora Overpass ~ Samrak IC.

== History ==
- 26 July 2001: Designated 13.8 km (8.57 mi) section route by Busan Metropolitan City Line No. 33, Urban Expressway No.3 (Gwanmun-daero)
- 21 March 2007: Designated 10.8 km (6.71 mi) section of Beomil-dong, Dong-gu, Busan Metropolitan City ~ Samrak IC as motorway except for the 2.34 km (1.45 mi) section in front of Gaewon Elementary School in Danggam-dong ~ Baekyang Tunnel ~ in front of Mosan Elementary School in Mora 3-dong
- 27 December 2017: Changed route extension from 13.8 km (8.57 mi) to 10.8 km (6.71 mi)

== Compositions ==
=== Capacity ===
The road includes multiple lanes in each direction, viz:

- Busan Harbor Part 5: Sujeong Tunnel ~ Gaewon Elementary School : 2 Lanes
- Gaewon Elementary School: Gukjebaekyang Apartment : 3 lanes (Pedestrian·Bicycle Road included)
- Baekyang Tunnel: 2 Lanes
- Baekyang Tunnel: Mora Overpass ~ Samrak IC : 3 Lanes

=== Tunnel ===
2 sections (Sujeong Tunnel, Baekyang Tunnel)

== Facilities ==
- IC: Interchange, IS: Intersection, TG: Toll Gate, TN: Tunnel, BR: Bridge
  - Blue Section (■): motorway section

Section	Name	Access Route	Location		Note
IC	Harbor Part 5	Busan Metropolitan City Line No. 22 (Dongseogoga-ro); Busan Metropolitan City Line No. 71 (Chunjang-daero); Seongnam-ro	Busan	Dong-gu	Can enter from Dongseogoga-ro, Chungjang-daero; Only open to Seongnam-ro
BR	Jwacheon Viaduct		Busan	Dong-gu	
IC	Jwacheon	Busan Metropolitan City Line No. 61 (Jungang-daero)	Busan	Dong-gu	Unable to enter Samrak direction Unable to enter Harbor direction
TN	Sujeong Tunnel		Busan	Dong-gu	Extension 2,356m (1.46 mi)
TN	Sujeong Tunnel		Busan	Busanjin-gu	Extension 2,356m (1.46 mi)
TG	Sujeong Tunnel Toll Gate		Busan	Busanjin-gu	
IS	Dongeuidaeeogwi Intersection	Busan Metropolitan City Line No. 30 (Gaya-daero)	Busan	Busanjin-gu	
BR	Gaya Viaduct		Busan	Busanjin-gu	Two-Storied Bridge
IS	Gaegeumjugong Apartment Intersection	Busan Metropolitan City Line No. 30 (Baekyang-daero)	Busan	Busanjin-gu	Lower Part Baekyanggwanmun-ro section
IS	Baekyangteoneoleogwi Three-way Intersection	Busan Metropolitan City Line No. 3202 (Dongpyeong-ro)	Busan	Busanjin-gu	Lower Part Baekyanggwanmun-ro section
TN	Baekyang Tunnel		Busan	Busanjin-gu	Extended 2,340m
TN	Baekyang Tunnel		Busan	Sasang-gu	Extended 2,340m
TG	Baekyang Tunnel Toll Gate		Busan	Sasang-gu	
IS	Mora	Mora-ro	Busan	Sasang-gu	Unable to enter Samrak direction Unable to enter Harbor direction
BR	Mora Viaduct		Busan	Sasang-gu	
IC	Samrak IC	Busan Metropolitan City Line No. 66 (Gangbyeon-daero)	Busan	Sasang-gu	
Directly connected to Jungang Expressway
