= National Route 24 (South Korea) =

Road in South Korea

National Route 24
- 국도 제24호선

Route information
- Length: 414.5 km (257.6 mi)
- Existed: 31 August 1971–present

Major junctions
- West end: Sinan County, South Jeolla Province
- East end: Nam District, Ulsan

Location
- Country: South Korea

Highway system
- Highway systems of South Korea; Expressways; National; Local
| ← National Route 23 | → National Route 25 |

National Route 24 is a national highway in South Korea that connects Sinan County to Nam District, Ulsan. It was established on 31 August 1971.

== History ==
- August 31, 1971: Became National Route No. 24 Gwangju ~ Ulsan Line by the General National Highway Route Designation Decree.
- July 31, 1980: Wonnyul-ri, Geumseong-myeon, Damyang-gun, Jeollanam-do ~ Sangdong-ri, Jusaeng-myeon, Namwon-gun, Jeollabuk-do 35.2 km section opened
- March 14, 1981: Starting point extended from 'Gwangju-si, Jeollanam-do' to 'Jido-eup, Sinan-gun, Jeollanam-do'. Accordingly changed from 'Gwangju ~ Ulsan Line' to 'Jido ~ Ulsan Line'.
- May 30, 1981: Road zone changed to the extended 89 km section according to the amendment of Presidential Decree No. 10247 General National Highway Route Designation Decree
- August 17, 1981: Nae-ri, Jido-eup, Sinan-gun ~ Yeongcheon-ri, Jangseong-eup, Jangseong-gun 86.619 km section, Danggwang-ri, Jangseong-eup, Jangseong-gun ~ Gaeksa-ri, Damyang-eup, Damyang-gun 12.12 km section upgraded to national highway opened
- March 11, 1989: Old road sites in Bansong-ri, Eonyang-myeon, Ulju-gun, Heegok-ri, Sanoe-myeon, Milyang-gun, Gyo-dong-ri, Milyang-eup area abolished
- January 19, 1993: Hampyeong Bypass Road (Gigak-ri, Hampyeong-eup, Hampyeong-gun) 700m section, Damyang Bypass Road (Yanggak-ri ~ Gaeksa-ri, Damyang-eup, Damyang-gun) 3.22 km section opened
- April 28, 1998: Dotong-dong ~ Gojuk-dong, Namwon-si 2.2 km section opened
- July 15, 1998: Sayeon Bridge (Sayeon-ri ~ Ipam-ri, Beomseo-myeon, Ulju-gun, Ulsan Metropolitan City) 1.2 km section reconstruction opening, existing section abolished
- November 12, 1998: Sotae-ri ~ Insan-ri, Cheongdo-myeon, Milyang-si 1.86 km section newly opened, existing 1.6 km section abolished
- December 21, 1999: Anui Bypass Road (Dangbon-ri ~ Seokcheon-ri, Anui-myeon, Hamyang-gun) 1.65 km section opened and existing 1.85 km section abolished, Geumcheon-ri ~ Geumgok-ri, Sanoe-myeon, Milyang-si 2.3 km section opened and existing 1.7 km section abolished
- December 31, 1999: Hakgyo ~ Hampyeong Road (Gigak-ri, Hampyeong-eup ~ Gangun-ri, Daedong-myeon, Hampyeong-gun) 3.9 km section expansion opening, existing section abolished
- February 24, 2000: Gunggeunjang-ri, Sangbuk-myeon ~ Bancheon-ri, Eonyang-eup, Ulju-gun, Ulsan Metropolitan City 13.3 km section designated as automobile-only road
- March 21, 2000: Chunhwa-ri, Bubuk-myeon ~ Naei-dong, Milyang-si 2.04 km section newly opened, existing 1.62 km section abolished
- August 25, 2001: Starting point extended from 'Jido-eup, Sinan-gun, Jeollanam-do' to 'Imja-myeon, Sinan-gun, Jeollanam-do', end point changed from 'Ulsan-si, Gyeongsangnam-do' to 'Nam-gu, Ulsan Metropolitan City'. Accordingly became 'Sinan ~ Ulsan Line'.
- December 30, 2002: Myosan Bypass Road (Banpo-ri ~ Gwangi-ri, Myosan-myeon, Hapcheon-gun) 2.58 km section expansion opening, existing 3.8 km section abolished
- December 18, 2003: Sangmudae Front (Daegok-ri, Samseo-myeon ~ Wolyeon-ri, Samgye-myeon, Jangseong-gun) 2.3 km section partial opening
- December 22, 2003: Mugeo-dong, Nam-gu, Ulsan ~ Jikdong-ri, Eonyang-eup section 16.06 km 4-lane expansion opening
- December 26, 2003: Route changed for Songjeong-ri ~ Daepyeong-ri, Geochang-eup, Geochang-gun section to not pass through Daedong-ri. Accordingly, Songjeong-ri ~ Daepyeong-ri, Geochang-eup, Geochang-gun section changed from 4.0 km to 2.6 km
- November 10, 2004: Haeje Bypass Road (Gwangjeong-ri, Jido-eup, Sinan-gun ~ Yuwol-ri, Haeje-myeon, Muan-gun) 11.0 km section expansion opening
- November 19, 2004: Hapcheon Bypass Road, part of Hapcheon ~ Ssangnim Road (Jeongyang-ri, Daeyang-myeon ~ Geumyang-ri, Hapcheon-eup, Hapcheon-gun) 4.0 km section expansion opening existing section abolished
- December 23, 2004: Due to Hapcheon Bypass Road and Hapcheon ~ Ssangnim Road expansion opening, existing Jeongyang Rotary, Jeongyang-ri, Daeyang-myeon ~ Hapcheon Intersection, Jeongyang-ri, Hapcheon-eup, Hapcheon-gun 530m section abolished
- December 29, 2004: Sangbuk ~ Eonyang Road (Gunggeunjang-ri, Sangbuk-myeon ~ Jakdong-ri, Eonyang-eup, Ulju-gun) 6.58 km section expansion opening, existing Sanjeon-ri ~ Cheonjeon-ri, Sangbuk-myeon, Ulju-gun 4.02 km section abolished
- January 20, 2005: Haebo ~ Samseo Road (Uchi-ri, Nasan-myeon, Hampyeong-gun ~ Daegok-ri, Samseo-myeon, Jangseong-gun) 10.82 km section expansion opening
- February 4, 2005: Samseo ~ Jangseong Road (Sachang-ri ~ Suok-ri, Samgye-myeon, Jangseong-gun) upbound 2.5 km section partial opening
- August 10, 2005: Samseo ~ Jangseong Road (Wolyeon-ri ~ Sachang-ri, Samgye-myeon, Jangseong-gun) 1.5 km section expansion opening, Sachang-ri ~ Suok-ri, Samgye-myeon, Jangseong-gun 2.5 km section partial opening
- October 27, 2005: Inwol-myeon Bypass Road (Samae Bypass Road), Namwon-si 1.7 km section opened
- December 23, 2005: Jisan-ri, Ingye-myeon ~ Gwaejeong-ri, Jeokseong-myeon, Sunchang-gun 4.95 km section expansion opening
- December 28, 2005: Gyo-dong ~ Geumcheon-ri, Sanoe-myeon, Milyang-si 4.74 km section and Dajuk-ri ~ Heegok-ri, Sanoe-myeon, Milyang-si 3.2 km section expansion opening, existing Namgi-ri ~ Geumcheon-ri, Sanoe-myeon, Milyang-si 2.79 km section and Dajuk-ri ~ Heegok-ri, Sanoe-myeon 1.51 km section abolished
- December 30, 2005: Due to Samseo ~ Jangseong Road expansion opening, existing Suhae-ri, Samseo-myeon ~ Sinho-ri, Hwangryong-myeon, Jangseong-gun 15.04 km section abolished
- June 2, 2006: Gyo-dong ~ Geumcheon-ri, Sanoe-myeon, Milyang-si 4.88 km section and Dajuk-ri ~ Heegok-ri, Sanoe-myeon, Milyang-si 3.3 km section full opening, abolished section changed to existing Namgi-ri ~ Sanoe-myeon Geumcheon-ri, Milyang-si 2.649 km section and Dajuk-ri ~ Geumgok-ri, Sanoe-myeon, Milyang-si 1.562 km section
- February 19, 2008: Sanoe ~ Sangbuk Road (Samyang-ri, Sannae-myeon, Milyang-si, Gyeongsangnam-do ~ Gunggeunjang-ri, Sangbuk-myeon, Ulju-gun, Ulsan Metropolitan City) 8.663 km section designated as automobile-only road
- March 24, 2008: Section 3 Gajisan Tunnel among Sannae ~ Sangbuk Road (Samyang-ri, Sannae-myeon, Milyang-si, Gyeongsangnam-do ~ Gunggeunjang-ri, Sangbuk-myeon, Ulju-gun, Ulsan Metropolitan City) 11.36 km section opened. However, Nammyeong Checkpoint, Samyang-ri, Sannae-myeon, Milyang-si ~ Guyeon Tunnel terminus section used temporarily. existing 18 km section abolished
- December 3, 2008: Naegyo-ri, Hampyeong-eup ~ Hyanggyo-ri, Daedong-myeon, Hampyeong-gun 1.8 km section expansion opening, existing section abolished
- December 21, 2009: Section to Eoreumgol Intersection among Sannae ~ Sangbuk Road (Nammyeong-ri ~ Samyang-ri, Sannae-myeon, Milyang-si) 4.0 km section partial opening
- April 30, 2010: Geumgok-ri, Sanoe-myeon ~ Yongjeon-ri, Sannae-myeon, Milyang-si 4.112 km section expansion opening, existing 2.29 km section abolished
- November 23, 2010: Mari ~ Songjeong Road (Malheul-ri, Mari-myeon ~ Songjeong-ri, Geochang-eup, Geochang-gun) 3.8 km section expansion opening, existing 5.2 km section abolished
- September 27, 2011: Nammyeong-ri ~ Samyang-ri, Sannae-myeon, Milyang-si 4.0 km section designated as automobile-only road
- June 21, 2013: Namjeong Bridge among Geumyang ~ Daeyang Road (Hapcheon-ri, Hapcheon-eup ~ Jeongyang-ri, Daeyang-myeon, Hapcheon-gun) 337m section newly opened
- July 26, 2013: Gain-ri ~ Nammyeong-ri, Sannae-myeon, Milyang-si 6.21 km section expansion opening, existing Gain-ri ~ Samyang-ri, Sannae-myeon, Milyang-si 7.0 km section abolished
- November 14, 2013: Jido ~ Imjado land bridge construction groundbreaking ceremony
- February 10, 2015: Songjeong Intersection ~ Mokdong Intersection among Songjeong ~ Masan Road (Songjeong-ri, Hyeongyeong-myeon, Muan-gun) 2.2 km section temporarily opened
- July 18, 2016: Geumyang ~ Daeyang Road (Nakmin-ri, Yulgok-myeon, Hapcheon-gun) 1.4 km section newly opened, existing Jeongyang-ri, Daeyang-myeon ~ Imbuk-ri, Yulgok-myeon, Hapcheon-gun 1.3 km and Nakmin-ri, Yulgok-myeon, Hapcheon-gun 1.2 km section abolished
- March 23, 2017: Sudeok-ri, Daesan-myeon ~ Sangdong-ri, Jusaeng-myeon, Namwon-si 360m section improvement opening, existing 380m section abolished
- February 9, 2018: Holtong Intersection ~ Songjeong Intersection among Songjeong ~ Masan Road (Masan-ri ~ Songjeong-ri, Hyeongyeong-myeon, Muan-gun) 6.5 km section temporarily opened
- February 12, 2018: Damyang ~ Sunchang Road (Gorye-ri, Geumgwa-myeon ~ Baeksan-ri, Sunchang-eup, Sunchang-gun) 2.97 km section partial expansion opening
- April 23, 2018: Songjeong ~ Masan Road (Masan-ri ~ Oeban-ri, Hyeongyeong-myeon, Muan-gun) 8.05 km entire section expansion opening, existing Masan-ri ~ Oryu-ri, Hyeongyeong-myeon, Muan-gun 610m section and Masan-ri ~ Pyeongsan-ri, Hyeongyeong-myeon, Muan-gun 8.8 km section abolished
- December 18, 2018: Damyang ~ Sunchang Road (Namsan-ri, Damyang-eup, Damyang-gun, Jeollanam-do ~ Baeksan-ri, Sunchang-eup, Sunchang-gun, Jeollabuk-do) 11.8 km entire section expansion opening, existing Hakdong-ri, Damyang-eup, Damyang-gun, Jeollanam-do ~ Gorye-ri, Geumgwa-myeon, Sunchang-gun, Jeollabuk-do 6.84 km section abolished
- February 10, 2021: Imja ~ Jido Road (Jin-ri, Imja-myeon ~ Gamjeong-ri, Jido-eup, Sinan-gun) 4.99 km section temporarily opened until February 15
- March 19, 2021: Imja ~ Jido Road and Imja Bridge (Jin-ri, Imja-myeon ~ Gamjeong-ri, Jido-eup, Sinan-gun) 4.99 km section newly opened

== Main stopovers ==
South Jeolla Province

- Sinan County - Muan County - Hampyeong County - Jangseong County - Damyang County

North Jeolla Province

- Sunchang County - Namwon

South Gyeongsang Province

- Hamyang County - Geochang County - Hapcheon County - Changnyeong County - Miryang

Ulsan

- Ulju County - Nam District

== Major intersections ==
- (■): Motorway

IS: Intersection, IC: Interchange

=== South Jeolla Province ===
| Name | Hangul name | Connection | Location | | Note |
|---|---|---|---|---|---|
| Imja-myeon Office | 임자면사무소 | Prefectural Route 825 (Imja-ro) | Sinan County | Imja-myeon | Terminus; Prefectural Route 825 overlap |
| (Unnamed bridge) | (교량 명칭 미상) | | Sinan County | Imja-myeon | Under construction Prefectural Route 825 overlap Connect Imjado ~ Sudo |
| Sudo | 수도 | | Sinan County | Imja-myeon | Prefectural Route 825 overlap |
| (Unnamed bridge) | (교량 명칭 미상) | | Sinan County | Imja-myeon | Prefectural Route 825 overlap Under construction Connect Sudo ~ Jido |
| (Unnamed bridge) | | | Sinan County | Jido-eup | Prefectural Route 825 overlap Under construction Connect Sudo ~ Jido |
| Jeomam Port | 점암항 | | Sinan County | Jido-eup | Prefectural Route 825 overlap |
| Jimyung High School Jidoseo Bus stop | 지명고등학교 지도서부정류소 | | Sinan County | Jido-eup | Prefectural Route 825 overlap |
| Jido IS | 지도사거리 | Prefectural Route 805 (Jidojeungdo-ro) | Sinan County | Jido-eup | Prefectural Route 805, 825 overlap |
| Jido Bus Terminal | 지도자동차여객공용터미널 | Prefectural Route 805 (Bongri-gil) | Sinan County | Jido-eup | Prefectural Route 805, 825 overlap |
| Eupnae IS | 읍내삼거리 | Wongwangjeong-gil | Sinan County | Jido-eup | Prefectural Route 825 overlap |
| Jadong IS | 자동 교차로 | Prefectural Route 825 (Dongcheon-gil) | Sinan County | Jido-eup | Prefectural Route 825 overlap |
| Myeongyang IS | 명양 교차로 | | Muan County | Haeje-myeon | |
| Cheonma IS | 천마 교차로 | Hyeonhae-ro | Muan County | Haeje-myeon | |
| Cheonjang IS | 천장 교차로 | Changmae-ro | Muan County | Haeje-myeon | |
| Masil Bridge | 마실교 | | Muan County | Haeje-myeon | |
| Suam IS | 수암 교차로 | National Route 77 (Hyeonhae-ro) | Muan County | Haeje-myeon | National Route 77 overlap |
| Jindeung IS | 진등 교차로 | Gaip-gil | Muan County | Hyeongyeong-myeon | National Route 77 overlap Under construction |
| Holtong IS | 홀통 교차로 | Masan-gil | Muan County | Hyeongyeong-myeon | National Route 77 overlap Under construction |
| Masan IS | 마산 교차로 | Masan-gil; Sinjeong-gil | Muan County | Hyeongyeong-myeon | National Route 77 overlap Under construction |
| Hyeongyeongbuk Elementary School | 현경북초등학교 | | Muan County | Hyeongyeong-myeon | National Route 77 overlap |
| Bongoje IS | 봉오제삼거리 | Bongwol-ro | Muan County | Hyeongyeong-myeon | National Route 77 overlap |
| Yongjeong IS | 용정 교차로 | Bongwol-ro | Muan County | Hyeongyeong-myeon | National Route 77 overlap Under construction |
| Songjeong IS | 송정 교차로 | Sangsujang-gil | Muan County | Hyeongyeong-myeon | National Route 77 overlap |
| Songjeong IS | 송정삼거리 | Mangun-ro | Muan County | Hyeongyeong-myeon | National Route 77 overlap |
| Mokdong IS | 목동 교차로 | National Route 77 (Gonghang-ro) | Muan County | Hyeongyeong-myeon | National Route 77 overlap |
| Hyeongyeong IS | 현경삼거리 | Prefectural Route 815 (Unhae-ro) | Muan County | Hyeongyeong-myeon | National Route 77 overlap |
| Hyeongyeong-myeon Office | 현경면사무소 | | Muan County | Hyeongyeong-myeon | National Route 77 overlap |
| Pyeongsan IS | 평산삼거리 | Hyeonnam-gil | Muan County | Hyeongyeong-myeon | National Route 77 overlap |
| Hyeongyeong IS | 현경 교차로 | National Route 77; Prefectural Route 60 (Gonghang-ro) | Muan County | Hyeongyeong-myeon | National Route 77 overlap |
| Dosanje IS | 도산제삼거리 | Jimang-gil | Muan County | Hyeongyeong-myeon | |
| Dosan IS | 도산삼거리 | Bopyeong-ro | Muan County | Muan-eup | |
| No name | (이름 없음) | Prefectural Route 811 (Japung-gil) (Jakdongsinpung-gil) | Hampyeong County | Hampyeong-eup | |
| Seongnam Elementary School (Closed) Hampyeong Cheonji CC | 성남초등학교 (폐교) 함평나비CC | | Hampyeong County | Hampyeong-eup | |
| Suho IS | 수호삼거리 | Hammu-gil | Hampyeong County | Hampyeong-eup | |
| Hampyeongsilgo IS | 함평실고삼거리 | Yeongsu-gil | Hampyeong County | Hampyeong-eup | |
| Hampyeongyeogo IS | 함평여고사거리 | Gonjea-ro; Seobu-gil | Hampyeong County | Hampyeong-eup | |
| Expo IS (Hampyeong Expo Park) | 엑스포삼거리 (함평엑스포공원) | | Hampyeong County | Hampyeong-eup | |
| Geomjeong IS | 검정오거리 | National Route 23 (Hamnyeong-ro); Hampyeongcheonjwa-gil | Hampyeong County | Hampyeong-eup | |
| East Hampyeong IC (Hyanggyo IS) | 동함평 나들목 (향교 교차로) | Muan-Gwangju Expressway; Hakdong-ro | Hampyeong County | Daedong-myeon | |
| Hampyeong Stadium | 함평공설운동장 | | Hampyeong County | Daedong-myeon | |
| No name | (이름 없음) | Daedong-gil | Hampyeong County | Daedong-myeon | |
| Gangun IS | 강운삼거리 | Sanggang-gil | Hampyeong County | Daedong-myeon | |
| Nasan-myeon Gusan-ri IS | 나산면구산리 교차로 | Gusanwonseon-gil | Hampyeong County | Nasan-myeon | |
| Nasan-myeon Deokrim-ri IS | 나산면덕림리 교차로 | Gomakcheon-ro | Hampyeong County | Nasan-myeon | |
| Nasan-myeon Samchuk-ri IS | 나산면삼축리 교차로 | Nasanwolbong-gil | Hampyeong County | Nasan-myeon | |
| No name | (이름 없음) | Nasan-gil | Hampyeong County | Nasan-myeon | |
| Nasan IS | 나산삼거리 | Nasan-gil | Hampyeong County | Nasan-myeon | |
| Nasan Elementary School | 나산초등학교 | | Hampyeong County | Nasan-myeon | |
| Daechang Bridge | 대창교 | | Hampyeong County | Nasan-myeon | |
| Daechang IS | 대창 교차로 | Haesam-ro | Hampyeong County | Haebo-myeon | |
| Yongsan IS | 용산 교차로 | National Route 22 (Yeonggwang-ro) | Hampyeong County | Haebo-myeon | |
| No name | (이름 없음) | Prefectural Route 838 (Miljae-ro) | Hampyeong County | Haebo-myeon | |
| Jeongsan IS | 정산 교차로 | Munhwa-ro | Hampyeong County | Wolya-myeon | |
| (Jujeon Overpass) | (주전육교) | | Hampyeong County | Wolya-myeon | |
| Hwahae IS | 화해 교차로 | Haesam-ro | Jangseong County | Samseo-myeon | |
| Sangmudaejinipro | 상무대진입로 | Haesam-ro | Jangseong County | Samseo-myeon | |
| Suyang IS | 수양사거리 | Haesam-ro | Jangseong County | Samseo-myeon | |
| Woljeong IS | 월정 교차로 | Prefectural Route 734 (Yeongjang-ro) | Jangseong County | Samgye-myeon | |
| Sachang IS | 사창사거리 | Sachang-ro; Samdong-ro | Jangseong County | Samgye-myeon | |
| Okcheon IS | 옥천사거리 | Prefectural Route 893 (Pyeongnimamchi-ro); Neungseong-ro | Jangseong County | Samgye-myeon | |
| Gunsan IS | 구산사거리 | Gurim-ro; Samdong-ro | Jangseong County | Donghwa-myeon | |
| Donghwa IC | 동화 나들목 | Prefectural Route 49 (Bichgaramjangseong-lo) | Jangseong County | Donghwa-myeon | |
| Donghwa IS | 동화사거리 | Suyeon-ro; Yowoljeong-ro | Jangseong County | Donghwa-myeon | |
| Jangseungbaeki IS | 장승백이사거리 | Mulmoe-gil; Samdong-ro | Jangseong County | Hwangryong-myeon | |
| Sinchon IS | 신촌사거리 | Baennadeuri-ro | Jangseong County | Hwangryong-myeon | |
| Jangsan IS | 장산사거리 | Honggildong-ro; Hwangryong-ro; Hasa 1-gil | Jangseong County | Hwangryong-myeon | |
| Hwangryong IS | 황룡 교차로 | Prefectural Route 734 (Gangbyeon-ro) | Jangseong County | Hwangryong-myeon | |
| Jangseong Overpass | 장성육교 | | Jangseong County | Jangseong-eup | |
| Jangseong IS | 장성 교차로 | National Route 1 (Haseo-daero) | Jangseong County | Jangseong-eup | National Route 1 overlap |
| Jangseong IC (Gajak IS) | 장성 나들목 (가작 교차로) | Honam Expressway; National Route 1 (Haseo-daero) | Jangseong County | Jangseong-eup | National Route 1 overlap |
| Jinwon IS | 진원삼거리 | Jinnam 1-ro | Jangseong County | Jinwon-myeon | |
| Jinwon-myeon Office | 진원면사무소 | | Jangseong County | Jinwon-myeon | |
| Jakdong IS | 작동삼거리 | Bultae 1-ro | Jangseong County | Jinwon-myeon | |
| Yangyu Bridge | 양유교 | | Jangseong County | Jinwon-myeon | |
| Yangyu Bridge | | | Damyang County | Daejeon-myeon | |
| Daechi IS | 대치사거리 | Daejeon-ro; Daechi 5-gil | Damyang County | Daejeon-myeon | |
| Hanjae Elementary School | 한재초등학교 | | Damyang County | Daejeon-myeon | |
| Wonchon IS | 원촌사거리 | Prefectural Route 898 (Byeongpung-ro); Chuseong 1-ro | Damyang County | Daejeon-myeon | Prefectural Route 898 overlap |
| Wolbon IS | 월본사거리 | National Route 13 (Chuseong-ro); Prefectural Route 898 (Byeongpung-ro) | Damyang County | Daejeon-myeon | National Route 13 overlap Prefectural Route 898 overlap |
| Seongsan IS | 성산사거리 | Deokjinoksan-gil; Seongsan-gil | Damyang County | Daejeon-myeon | National Route 13 overlap |
| Goseong IS | 고성사거리 | Goridae-gil | Damyang County | Subuk-myeon | National Route 13 overlap |
| Subuk IS | 수북사거리 | Hansudong-ro | Damyang County | Subuk-myeon | National Route 13 overlap |
| Pungsu IS | 풍수사거리 | Dongsang-gil | Damyang County | Subuk-myeon | National Route 13 overlap |
| Pungsu Bridge | 풍수교 | | Damyang County | Subuk-myeon | National Route 13 overlap |
| Jupyeong IS | 주평사거리 | Gasan-gil; Misan-gil | Damyang County | Subuk-myeon | National Route 13 overlap |
| Samda Bridge | 삼다교 | | Damyang County | Damyang-eup | National Route 13 overlap |
| Yanggak IS (Damyang Fire Station) | 양각사거리 (담양소방서) | National Route 13; Prefectural Route 15 (Jukhyangmunhwa-ro) | Damyang County | Damyang-eup | National Route 13 overlap |
| Yanggak Bridge | 양각교 | | Damyang County | Damyang-eup | |
| Cheonbyeon IS | 천변사거리 | Prefectural Route 887 (Cheonbyeon 5-gil) (Myeonangjeong-ro) | Damyang County | Damyang-eup | |
| Korea Bamboo Museum | 한국대나무박물관 | | Damyang County | Damyang-eup | |
| Baekdong IS | 백동사거리 | National Route 13; National Route 15; National Route 29; Prefectural Route 15; Prefectural Route 887 (Jukyang-daero); Prefectural Route 55 (Mujeong-ro) | Damyang County | Damyang-eup | National Route 13, National Route 15, National Route 29 overlap Prefectural Route 15, 55, 887 overlap |
| Damyang-eup IS | 담양읍삼거리 | National Route 13; National Route 15; National Route 29; Prefectural Route 15; Prefectural Route 887 (Jungang-ro) | Damyang County | Damyang-eup | National Route 13, National Route 15, National Route 29 overlap Prefectural Route 15, 55, 887 overlap |
| Namchon IS | 남촌 교차로 | Namchon-gil | Damyang County | Damyang-eup | Prefectural Route 55 overlap |
| Seokdanggan IS | 석당간 교차로 | Chuseong-ro | Damyang County | Damyang-eup | Prefectural Route 55 overlap |
| Hakdong IS | 학동 교차로 | Jukhyangmunhwa-ro | Damyang County | Damyang-eup | Prefectural Route 55 overlap |
| Geumwol IS | 금월 교차로 | Metasekwoia-ro | Damyang County | Damyang-eup | Prefectural Route 55 overlap |
| Geumwol Bridge | 금월교 | | Damyang County | Damyang-eup | Prefectural Route 55 overlap |
| Geumwol Bridge | | | Damyang County | Geumseong-myeon | Prefectural Route 55 overlap |
| Bangok IS | 반곡사거리 | Prefectural Route 897 (Byeongmong-ro) (Siamgol-ro) | Damyang County | Geumseong-myeon | Prefectural Route 55 overlap |
| Seokhyeon Bridge | 석현교 | | Damyang County | Geumseong-myeon | Prefectural Route 55 overlap |
| Wonyul IS | 원율삼거리 | Geumseongsanseong-gil | Damyang County | Geumseong-myeon | Prefectural Route 55 overlap |
| Agricultural Complex (Geumseong Agricultural Complex) | 농공단지앞 (담양금성농공단지) | Geumseonggongdan-gil | Damyang County | Geumseong-myeon | Prefectural Route 55 overlap |
| Deokseong IS | 덕성 교차로 | | Damyang County | Geumseong-myeon | Prefectural Route 55 overlap Under construction |
| Dalmaji Park (Geumgwadongsan) | 달맞이공원(금과동산) | | Damyang County | Geumseong-myeon | Prefectural Route 55 overlap Continuation into North Jeolla Province |

=== North Jeolla Province ===
| Name | Hangul name | Connection | Location | | Note |
|---|---|---|---|---|---|
| Geumgwadongsan (Dalmajigongwon) | 금과동산(달맞이공원) | | Sunchang County | Geumgwa-myeon | Prefectural Route 55 overlap South Jeolla Province - North Jeolla Province border line |
| Bangchuk IS | 방축삼거리 | Prefectural Route 730 (Geumpung-ro); Gorye-gil | Sunchang County | Geumgwa-myeon | Prefectural Route 55 overlap South Jeolla Province - North Jeolla Province border line |
| No name | (이름 없음) | Gwangdeok-ro | Sunchang County | Geumgwa-myeon | Prefectural Route 55 overlap South Jeolla Province - North Jeolla Province border line |
| Geumgwa Golf Course | 금과골프장 | | Sunchang County | Geumgwa-myeon | Prefectural Route 55 overlap South Jeolla Province - North Jeolla Province border line |
| Songjeong IS | 송정 교차로 | | Sunchang County | Sunchang-eup | Prefectural Route 55 overlap Under construction |
| Gochujang Complex IS | 고추장단지 교차로 | Prefectural Route 55 (Jangryu-ro) | Sunchang County | Sunchang-eup | Prefectural Route 55 overlap |
| Chungsin IS | 충신 교차로 | Sunhwa-ro | Sunchang County | Sunchang-eup | |
| Sunchang High School | 순창고교 교차로 | National Route 27; Prefectural Route 729 (Okcheon-ro) | Sunchang County | Sunchang-eup | National Route 27 overlap Prefectural Route 729 overlap |
| Gwanseo IS | 관서삼거리 | Sunchang-ro | Sunchang County | Sunchang-eup | National Route 27 overlap |
| Jeilgo IS (Sunchang Jeil High School) | 제일고삼거리 (순창제일고등학교) | National Route 27 (Daedong-ro) | Sunchang County | Sunchang-eup | National Route 27 overlap |
| Sunchang Junior High School | 순창중학교 | | Sunchang County | Sunchang-eup | |
| Jisan IS | 지산사거리 | Ogyo-ro | Sunchang County | Yudeung-myeon | |
| Taeja IS | 태자삼거리 | Injung-ro | Sunchang County | Ingye-myeon | |
| Jibuk IS | 지북사거리 | Yuhwa-ro; Inseok-ro | Sunchang County | Jeokseong-myeon | |
| Gwanpyeong IS | 관평사거리 | Yujeok-ro; Jeokseong-ro | Sunchang County | Jeokseong-myeon | |
| Wonchon IS | 원촌삼거리 | Jeokseong-ro | Sunchang County | Jeokseong-myeon | |
| Jeokseong Bridge | 적성교 | | Sunchang County | Jeokseong-myeon | |
| Goejeong IS | 괴정삼거리 | National Route 13; National Route 21 (Chunghyo-ro) | Sunchang County | Jeokseong-myeon | National Route 13, National Route 21 overlap |
| Suhong IS | 수홍삼거리 | National Route 13; National Route 21 (Seomjin-ro) | Namwon City | Daegang-myeon | National Route 13, National Route 21 overlap |
| Pungsan IS | 풍산삼거리 | Donggye-ro | Namwon City | Daegang-myeon | |
| Bihongjae | 비홍재 | | Namwon City | Daegang-myeon | |
| Bihongjae | | | Namwon City | Jusaeng-myeon | |
| Gamdong IS | 감동사거리 | Geumpung-ro; Gamdong 1-gil | Namwon City | Daesan-myeon | |
| Jeongsong IS | 정송삼거리 | Prefectural Route 745 (Jusong-gil) | Namwon City | Jusaeng-myeon | Prefectural Route 745 overlap |
| Daegok IS | 대곡삼거리 | Prefectural Route 745 (Daegoksingye-gil) | Namwon City | Jusaeng-myeon | Prefectural Route 745 overlap |
| Jeongsong Bridge | 정송교 | | Namwon City | Daesan-myeon | |
| Namwon Seowon Elementary School | 남원서원초등학교 | | Namwon City | Daesan-myeon | |
| Sinjeong IS | 신정 교차로 | National Route 17 (Seobu-ro) | Namwon City | Wangjeong-dong | |
| No name | (이름 없음) | Gyoryong-ro | Namwon City | Wangjeong-dong | Connected with Namwon Station |
| Manboksaji Namwon Office of Education | 만복사지 남원교육지원청 | | Namwon City | Wangjeong-dong | |
| Sijang IS | 시장사거리 | Nammun-ro; Uichong-ro | Namwon City | Wangjeong-dong | |
| Seomun IS | 서문사거리 | Seomun-ro; Yongseong-ro; Uichong-ro | Namwon City | Wangjeong-dong | |
| Seomun IS | | Seomun-ro; Yongseong-ro; Uichong-ro | Namwon City | Dongchung-dong | |
| Namwon Station | (구)남원역 | Hyangdan-ro | Namwon City | Dongchung-dong | |
| Hyanggyo IS | 향교오거리 | Dongrim-ro; Dongmun-ro | Namwon City | Hyanggyo-dong | |
| Sicheong IS | 시청삼거리 | Sicheong-ro | Namwon City | Hyanggyo-dong | |
| Baekgongsan IS | 백공산사거리 | Chunhyang-ro | Namwon City | Hyanggyo-dong | |
| Namwon IC (Namwon IS) | 남원 나들목 (남원 교차로) | Gwangju-Daegu Expressway | Namwon City | Dotong-dong | |
| Namwon Stadium | 남원공설운동장 | | Namwon City | Dotong-dong | |
| Namwon Medical Center | 남원의료원 | Hwangjuk-ro | Namwon City | Dotong-dong | |
| Nureundae IS | 누른대삼거리 | Yocheon-ro | Namwon City | Dotong-dong | |
| Gojuk IS | 고죽 교차로 | National Route 19 (Sanneom-ro) | Namwon City | Dotong-dong | National Route 19 overlap |
| Namwon Fire Station | 남원소방서 | | Namwon City | Dotong-dong | National Route 19 overlap |
| Galchi IS | 갈치삼거리 | Prefectural Route 721 (Bosan-ro) | Namwon City | Dotong-dong | National Route 19 overlap |
| Yocheon IS | 요천삼거리 | National Route 19 (Yocheon-ro) | Namwon City | Dotong-dong | National Route 19 overlap |
| Yocheon Bridge | 요천교 | | Namwon City | Dotong-dong | |
| Yocheon Bridge | | | Namwon City | Ibaek-myeon | |
| Nampyeong IS | 남평삼거리 | Yocheonsang-ro | Namwon City | Ibaek-myeon | |
| Ganggi IS | 강기삼거리 | Ibaengnaecheok-gil | Namwon City | Ibaek-myeon | |
| Byeonjeonso IS | 변전소삼거리 | Ibaek-ro | Namwon City | Ibaek-myeon | |
| Yeowonchi | 여원치 | | Namwon City | Ibaek-myeon | Elevation 470m |
| Horseman High School | 한국경마축산고등학교 | | Namwon City | Unbong-eup | |
| Unbong IS | 운봉삼거리 | Prefectural Route 730 (Unseong-ro) | Namwon City | Unbong-eup | |
| Unbong-eup Office | 운봉읍사무소 | | Namwon City | Unbong-eup | |
| Bukcheon IS | 북천삼거리 | Prefectural Route 60 (Unbong-ro) | Namwon City | Unbong-eup | Prefectural Route 60 overlap |
| Beonam IS | 번암사거리 | Prefectural Route 743 (Seungjeon-ro); Unseong-ro | Namwon City | Unbong-eup | Prefectural Route 60 overlap |
| Hwasu Bridge | 화수교 | | Namwon City | Unbong-eup | Prefectural Route 60 overlap |
| Seomu IS | 서무 교차로 | Inwol-ro; Inwol 1-gil | Namwon City | Inwol-myeon | Prefectural Route 60 overlap |
| Inwol IS | 인월 교차로 | Prefectural Route 37 (Inwoljangteo-ro) | Namwon City | Inwol-myeon | Prefectural Route 60 overlap |
| Sinchon IS | 신촌 교차로 | Prefectural Route 60 (Cheonwangbong-ro) | Namwon City | Inwol-myeon | Prefectural Route 60 overlap |
| Sangu IS | 상우 교차로 | Inwol-ro | Namwon City | Inwol-myeon | |
| Palryeong | 팔령 | | Namwon City | Inwol-myeon | Continuation into South Gyeongsang Province |

=== South Gyeongsang Province ===
| Name | Hangul name | Connection | Location | | Note |
|---|---|---|---|---|---|
| Palryeong | 팔령 | | Hamyang County | Hamyang-eup | North Jeolla Province - South Gyeongsang Province border line |
| No name | (이름 없음) | Prefectural Route 1023 (Jirisanganeun-gil) | Hamyang County | Hamyang-eup | |
| Nanpyeong IS | 난평삼거리 | Hamyang-ro | Hamyang County | Hamyang-eup | |
| Indang IS | 인당사거리 | Prefectural Route 1001 (Hamyangnamseo-ro) | Hamyang County | Hamyang-eup | |
| Hamyang County Public Health Center | 함양군보건소 | Yongpyeongjungang-gil | Hamyang County | Hamyang-eup | |
| Hamyang Intercity Bus Terminal | 함양시외버스터미널 | | Hamyang County | Hamyang-eup | |
| Juchajang IS | 주차장사거리 | Prefectural Route 1084 (Goun-ro) | Hamyang County | Hamyang-eup | |
| No name | (이름 없음) | Hamyang-ro | Hamyang County | Hamyang-eup | |
| Bosan Bridge | 보산교 | Gongbae-gil | Hamyang County | Jigok-myeon | |
| No name | (이름 없음) | Jigokchangchon-gil | Hamyang County | Jigok-myeon | |
| Jigok-myeon Office | 지곡면사무소 | | Hamyang County | Jigok-myeon | |
| Jigok IC | 지곡 나들목 | Tongyeong-Daejeon Expressway | Hamyang County | Jigok-myeon | |
| Dangbon Overpass | 당본육교 | Gwangpung-ro | Hamyang County | Anui-myeon | |
| Namgang Bridge | 남강교 | | Hamyang County | Anui-myeon | |
| Anui IS | 안의 교차로 | National Route 3 (Geoham-daero) | Hamyang County | Anui-myeon | National Route 3 overlap |
| Seokcheon IS | 석천 교차로 | Hwangma-ro | Hamyang County | Anui-myeon | National Route 3 overlap |
| Geumcheon IS | 금천 교차로 | Gwangpung-ro; Anuidojanggol-gil | Hamyang County | Anui-myeon | National Route 3 overlap |
| Gyobuk IS | 교북 교차로 | National Route 26 (Yuksimnyeong-ro) | Hamyang County | Anui-myeon | National Route 3, National Route 26 overlap |
| Yongchu IS | 용추 교차로 | Yongchugyegok-ro | Hamyang County | Anui-myeon | National Route 3, National Route 26 overlap |
| Samsan IS | 삼산 교차로 | Geoan-ro | Hamyang County | Anui-myeon | National Route 3, National Route 26 overlap |
| Baraegijae | 바래기재 | | Hamyang County | Anui-myeon | National Route 3, National Route 26 overlap |
| Baraegijae | | | Geochang County | Mari-myeon | National Route 3, National Route 26 overlap |
| Samgeo-ri IS | 삼거리 교차로 | Geoan-ro | Geochang County | Mari-myeon | National Route 3, National Route 26 overlap |
| Jidong IS | 지동 교차로 | National Route 37 (Geoan-ro) | Geochang County | Mari-myeon | National Route 3, National Route 26, National Route 37 overlap |
| Malheul IS | 말흘 교차로 | Geoan-ro | Geochang County | Mari-myeon | National Route 3, National Route 26, National Route 37 overlap |
| Jangbaek Tunnel | 장백터널 | | Geochang County | Mari-myeon | National Route 3, National Route 26, National Route 37 overlap Approximately 639m |
| Jangbaek Tunnel | | | Geochang County | Geochang-eup | National Route 3, National Route 26, National Route 37 overlap Approximately 639m |
| Geojeol Tunnel | 거열터널 | | Geochang County | Geochang-eup | National Route 3, National Route 26, National Route 37 overlap Approximately 544m |
| Songjeong IS | 송정 교차로 | National Route 3 (Ongyang-ro) | Geochang County | Geochang-eup | National Route 3, National Route 26, National Route 37 overlap |
| Jeolbu IS | 절부사거리 | Gangnam-ro; Gangbyeon-ro | Geochang County | Geochang-eup | National Route 26 overlap |
| No name | (이름 없음) | Gangnam-ro 1-gil | Geochang County | Geochang-eup | National Route 26 overlap |
| Gimcheon IS | 김천사거리 | Prefectural Route 1084 (Sunam-ro) | Geochang County | Geochang-eup | National Route 26 overlap |
| No name | (이름 없음) | Geoham-daero 4-gil Changnam 2-gil | Geochang County | Geochang-eup | National Route 26 overlap |
| No name | (이름 없음) | Geochang-daero | Geochang County | Geochang-eup | National Route 26 overlap |
| No name | (이름 없음) | Prefectural Route 1089 (Changdong-ro) | Geochang County | Geochang-eup | National Route 26 overlap Prefectural Route 1089 overlap |
| Geochang Fire Station | 거창소방서 | Geoham-daero | Geochang County | Geochang-eup | National Route 26 overlap Prefectural Route 1089 overlap |
| Geochang IC | 거창 나들목 | Gwangju-Daegu Expressway | Geochang County | Geochang-eup | National Route 26 overlap Prefectural Route 1089 overlap |
| Guknongso IS | 국농소삼거리 | Prefectural Route 1089 (Bamtijae-ro) | Geochang County | Geochang-eup | National Route 26 overlap Prefectural Route 1089 overlap |
| Namha Bridge | 남하교 | | Geochang County | Geochang-eup | National Route 26 overlap |
| Namha Bridge | | | Geochang County | Namha-myeon | National Route 26 overlap |
| Namha-myeon Office Namha Elementary School | 남하면사무소 남하초등학교 | | Geochang County | Namha-myeon | National Route 26 overlap |
| Sanpo IS | 산포삼거리 | Prefectural Route 1099 (Jisan-ro) | Geochang County | Namha-myeon | National Route 26 overlap |
| Seoku Bridge | 석우교 | | Geochang County | Namha-myeon | National Route 26 overlap |
| Gacheon Bridge | 가천교 | | Geochang County | Namha-myeon | National Route 26 overlap |
| Gacheon Bridge | | | Hapcheon County | Bongsan-myeon | National Route 26 overlap |
| Bongsan IS | 봉산삼거리 | National Route 59; Prefectural Route 1034 (Seobu-ro) | Hapcheon County | Bongsan-myeon | National Route 26 overlap Prefectural Route 1034 overlap |
| Gwonbin IS | 권빈삼거리 | Prefectural Route 1034 (Indeok-ro) | Hapcheon County | Bongsan-myeon | National Route 26 overlap Prefectural Route 1034 overlap |
| Banpo Bridge | 반포교 | Myosan-ro | Hapcheon County | Myosan-myeon | National Route 26 overlap |
| Myosan IS | 묘산 교차로 | National Route 26 (Yeongseo-ro) | Hapcheon County | Myosan-myeon | National Route 26 overlap |
| Maryeongjae | 마령재 | Dusang-ro | Hapcheon County | Myosan-myeon | |
| Maryeongjae | | Dusang-ro | Hapcheon County | Hapcheon-eup | |
| Geumyang IS | 금양삼거리 | Daeya-ro | Hapcheon County | Hapcheon-eup | |
| Geumgang IS | 금양 교차로 | National Route 33 (Hapcheon-daero); Prefectural Route 1034 (Daeya-ro) | Hapcheon County | Hapcheon-eup | National Route 33 overlap |
| Sinsoyang Bridge | 신소양교 | | Hapcheon County | Hapcheon-eup | National Route 33 overlap |
| Gyodong IS | 교동 교차로 | Gangbyeon-ro; Oksan-ro | Hapcheon County | Hapcheon-eup | National Route 33 overlap |
| Hapcheon Bridge | 합천대교 | | Hapcheon County | Hapcheon-eup | National Route 33 overlap |
| Hapcheon Bridge | | | Hapcheon County | Daeyang-myeon | National Route 33 overlap |
| Hapcheon IS | 합천 교차로 | National Route 33 (Hapcheon-daero); Dongbu-ro | Hapcheon County | Daeyang-myeon | National Route 33 overlap |
| Yeongjeongyo IS | 영전교 교차로 | Prefectural Route 1034 (Jenae-ro) | Hapcheon County | Yulgok-myeon | Prefectural Route 1034 overlap |
| Nakmin IS | 낙민삼거리 | Prefectural Route 1034 (Hwanggangokjeon-ro) | Hapcheon County | Yulgok-myeon | Prefectural Route 1034 overlap |
| No name | (이름 없음) | Uhoe-ro | Hapcheon County | Chogye-myeon | |
| No name | (이름 없음) | Chogyejungang-ro | Hapcheon County | Chogye-myeon | |
| Chogye Health Center | 초계보건지소 | | Hapcheon County | Chogye-myeon | |
| No name | (이름 없음) | Chogyejungang-ro | Hapcheon County | Chogye-myeon | |
| Jeokjung IS | 적중삼거리 | Prefectural Route 907 (Jeokjung-ro) | Hapcheon County | Chogye-myeon | Prefectural Route 907 overlap |
| Jeokjung Bridge | 적중교 서단 | Prefectural Route 907 (Hwanggangokcheon-ro) | Hapcheon County | Jeokjung-myeon | Prefectural Route 907 overlap |
| No name | (이름 없음) | Uhoe-ro | Hapcheon County | Jeokjung-myeon | |
| Cheongdeok-myeon Office | 청덕면사무소 | | Hapcheon County | Cheongdeok-myeon | |
| No name | (이름 없음) | Gangbuk-ro | Hapcheon County | Cheongdeok-myeon | |
| Jeokpo IS | 적포삼거리 | National Route 20 (Uihap-daero) | Hapcheon County | Cheongdeok-myeon | National Route 20 overlap |
| Jeokpo Bridge | 적포교 | | Hapcheon County | Cheongdeok-myeon | National Route 20 overlap |
| Jeokpo Bridge | | | Changnyeong County | Ibang-myeon | National Route 20 overlap |
| Inam IS | 이남삼거리 | Prefectural Route 67 (Ibang-ro) | Changnyeong County | Ibang-myeon | National Route 20 overlap Prefectural Route 67 overlap |
| Yueo Bridge | 유어교 | | Changnyeong County | Ibang-myeon | National Route 20 overlap Prefectural Route 67 overlap |
| Yueo Bridge | | | Changnyeong County | Yueo-myeon | National Route 20 overlap Prefectural Route 67 overlap |
| Yueo-myeon Office | 유어면사무소 | | Changnyeong County | Yueo-myeon | National Route 20 overlap Prefectural Route 67 overlap |
| Yueo IS | 유어삼거리 | National Route 79; Prefectural Route 67 (Yeongsanjangma-ro) | Changnyeong County | Yueo-myeon | National Route 20 overlap Prefectural Route 67 overlap |
| No name | (이름 없음) | Uponeup-gil | Changnyeong County | Yueo-myeon | National Route 20 overlap |
| Boncho IS | 본초삼거리 | Gwandong-gil | Changnyeong County | Daeji-myeon | National Route 20 overlap |
| Changnyeong IC (Changnyeong IC IS) | 창녕 나들목 (창녕IC사거리) | Jungbu Expressway; Upoyueonong-ro | Changnyeong County | Changnyeong-eup | National Route 20 overlap |
| Orijeong IS | 오리정사거리 | Prefectural Route 1080 (Upo 2-ro) | Changnyeong County | Changnyeong-eup | National Route 20 overlap |
| Myeongdeok Elementary School Changnyeong Seokbinggo | 명덕초등학교 창녕 석빙고 | | Changnyeong County | Changnyeong-eup | National Route 20 overlap |
| Songhyeon IS | 송현사거리 | Cheokgyeongbi-ro; Hwawangsan-ro | Changnyeong County | Changnyeong-eup | National Route 20 overlap |
| Changnyeong Gyo-dong and Songhyeon-dong Tombstone | 창녕 교동과 송현동 고분군 | | Changnyeong County | Changnyeong-eup | National Route 20 overlap |
| Changnyeong Technical High School | 창녕공업고등학교 | | Changnyeong County | Goam-myeon | National Route 20 overlap |
| Goam IS | 고암사거리 | Eongmanmisan-ro; Jungdae-gil | Changnyeong County | Goam-myeon | National Route 20 overlap |
| Goam IS | 고암사거리 | National Route 20 (Goamseongsan-daero) | Changnyeong County | Goam-myeon | National Route 20 overlap |
| Cheonwangjae | 천왕재 | | Changnyeong County | Goam-myeon | |
| Cheonwangjae | | | Miryang City | Cheongdo-myeon | |
| Gugi IS | 구기 교차로 | Cheongdo-ro; Sotae-gil; Sotae 1-gil | Miryang City | Cheongdo-myeon | |
| Cheongdo IS | 청도삼거리 | Cheongdo-ro | Miryang City | Cheongdo-myeon | |
| Miryang Middle School Cheongdo Branch | 밀양중학교 청도분교 | | Miryang City | Cheongdo-myeon | |
| Oyeon Bridge | 오연교 | | Miryang City | Cheongdo-myeon | |
| Oyeon Bridge | | | Miryang City | Muan-myeon | |
| No name | (이름 없음) | Prefectural Route 30 (Yogo-gil) | Miryang City | Muan-myeon | Prefectural Route 30 overlap |
| Dongsan IS | 동산삼거리 | Prefectural Route 30 (Samyeong-ro) | Miryang City | Muan-myeon | Prefectural Route 30 overlap |
| Apgogae | 앞고개 | | Miryang City | Muan-myeon | |
| Apgogae | | | Miryang City | Bubuk-myeon | |
| Gyesan Bridge | 계산교 | | Miryang City | Bubuk-myeon | |
| Gasan Clinic | 가산보건진료소 | | Miryang City | Bubuk-myeon | |
| Chunhwa IS | 춘화삼거리 | National Route 58 (Wiyang-ro) | Miryang City | Bubuk-myeon | National Route 58 overlap |
| Chunhwa Overpass | 춘화육교 | Chungi 3-gil | Miryang City | Bubuk-myeon | National Route 58 overlap |
| Unjeon IS | 운전 교차로 | National Route 58 (Sapo-ro) | Miryang City | Bubuk-myeon | National Route 58 overlap |
| Sinchon IS (Changwon District Court Miryang Branch) (Changwon District Prosecutors' Office) | 신촌오거리 (창원지방법원 밀양지원) (창원지방검찰청 밀양지청) | National Route 25 (Miryang-daero); Jungan-ro | Miryang City | Naei-dong | National Route 25 overlap |
| Sicheongseomun IS | 시청서문사거리 | Baengmin-ro; Sicheong-ro | Miryang City | Gyo-dong | National Route 25 overlap |
| Miryang City Hall | 밀양시청 | | Miryang City | Gyo-dong | National Route 25 overlap |
| Gyodong IS | 교동사거리 | Gyodong-ro; Seokjeong-ro | Miryang City | Gyo-dong | National Route 25 overlap |
| Miryang Park | 밀양대공원 | Miryangdaegongwon-ro | Miryang City | Gyo-dong | National Route 25 overlap |
| Gyo-dong Community Center Entrance | 교동주민센터입구 | Gyodong-ro | Miryang City | Gyo-dong | National Route 25 overlap |
| Gyodong IS | 교동 교차로 | Anin-ro; Yongpyeong-ro | Miryang City | Gyo-dong | National Route 25 overlap |
| Mirsan Bridge | 밀산교 | | Miryang City | Gyo-dong | National Route 25 overlap |
| Mirsan Bridge | | | Miryang City | Sanoe-myeon | National Route 25 overlap |
| Ginneup IS | 긴늪사거리 | National Route 25 (Sangdong-ro) | Miryang City | Sanoe-myeon | National Route 25 overlap |
| Miryang IC (Miryang IC IS) | 밀양 나들목 (밀양IC 교차로) | Jungang Expressway | Miryang City | Sanoe-myeon | |
| Geumcheon IS | 금천 교차로 | Sanoe-ro | Miryang City | Sanoe-myeon | |
| Dajuk IS | 다죽 교차로 | Sanoe-ro; Sanoenam-ro | Miryang City | Sanoe-myeon | |
| Geumgok IS | 금곡 교차로 | Pyochung-ro | Miryang City | Sanoe-myeon | |
| Bora IS | 보라 교차로 | Huigok 1-gil | Miryang City | Sanoe-myeon | |
| Baksan IS | 박산 교차로 | Huigok 2-gil | Miryang City | Sanoe-myeon | |
| Goegok IS | 괴곡 교차로 | | Miryang City | Sanoe-myeon | |
| Hachon IS | 하촌 교차로 | Sannaeyongjeon-gil | Miryang City | Sannae-myeon | |
| Yongjeon IS | 용전 교차로 | Sannae-ro; Sannaeyongjeon-gil | Miryang City | Sannae-myeon | |
| Gain IS | 가인 교차로 | Prefectural Route 1077 (Sannae-ro) | Miryang City | Sannae-myeon | Prefectural Route 1077 overlap |
| Wonseo IS | 원서 교차로 | Sannae-ro | Miryang City | Sannae-myeon | Prefectural Route 1077 overlap |
| Eoleumgol IS | 얼음골 교차로 | Prefectural Route 1077 (Doraejae-ro) | Miryang City | Sannae-myeon | Prefectural Route 1077 overlap |
| Eoleumgol Bridge | 얼음골대교 | | Miryang City | Sannae-myeon | |
| Hobakso Tunnel | 호박소터널 | | Miryang City | Sannae-myeon | Approximately 2,580m |
| Guyeon Bridge | 구연교 | | Miryang City | Sannae-myeon | |
| Gajisan Tunnel | 가지산터널 | | Miryang City | Sannae-myeon | Right tunnel: Approximately 4,580m Left tunnel: Approximately 4,534m Continuation into Ulsan |

=== Ulsan ===
| Name | Hangul name | Connection | Location | | Note |
|---|---|---|---|---|---|
| Gajisan Tunnel | 가지산터널 | | Ulsan | Ulju County Sangbuk-myeon | Right tunnel: Approximately 4,580m Left tunnel: Approximately 4,534m South Gyeongsang Province - Ulsan border line |
| Deokhyeon IS | 덕현 교차로 | Prefectural Route 69 (Unmun-ro) | Ulsan | Ulju County Sangbuk-myeon | |
| Gunggeunjeong IS | 궁근정 교차로 | Seongnam-ro | Ulsan | Ulju County Sangbuk-myeon | |
| Jangseong IS | 장성 교차로 | Seongnam-ro | Ulsan | Ulju County Sangbuk-myeon | |
| Yangdeung IS | 양등 교차로 | Sangbung-ro; Chanmullaegi-gil | Ulsan | Ulju County Sangbuk-myeon | |
| Dodong IS | 도동 교차로 | Dodongsilli-ro; Mallangmol-gil; Bisim-gil; Songragol-gil | Ulsan | Ulju County Sangbuk-myeon | |
| Jinae IS | 지내 교차로 | Hyangsandagae-ro | Ulsan | Ulju County Sangbuk-myeon | |
| Jikdong IS | 직동 교차로 | Naegongneunggol-gil; Sinhwa-gil | Ulsan | Ulju County Eonyang-eup | |
| Eonyang IS | 언양 교차로 | National Route 35 (Bangudae-ro) | Ulsan | Ulju County Eonyang-eup | |
| Eoeumhaburaempeu | 어음하부램프 | Eonyang-ro | Ulsan | Ulju County Eonyang-eup | |
| Gusu IS | 구수 교차로 | Ulsanyeong-ro | Ulsan | Ulju County Eonyang-eup | |
| Bansong IS | 반송 교차로 | Daeamdungi-ro | Ulsan | Ulju County Eonyang-eup | |
| Cheonso IS | 천소 교차로 | Miyeon 1-gil Bancheongangbyeon-gil | Ulsan | Ulju County Eonyang-eup | |
| Cheonso Bridge | 천소교 | | Ulsan | Ulju County Eonyang-eup | |
| No name | (이름 없음) | Eonyang-ro | Ulsan | Ulju County Eonyang-eup | |
| Mudeung Bridge | 무등교 | | Ulsan | Ulju County Eonyang-eup | |
| Mudeung Bridge | | | Ulsan | Ulju County Beomseo-eup | |
| Gwagidaehaburaempeu | 과기대하부램프 | UNIST-gil | Ulsan | Ulju County Beomseo-eup | |
| Sayeon Bridge | 사연교 | | Ulsan | Ulju County Beomseo-eup | |
| Jinmokma-eul | 진목마을 | Jinmogaraet-gil | Ulsan | Ulju County Beomseo-eup | |
| Ipam IS | 입암 교차로 | Songhyeon-gil | Ulsan | Ulju County Beomseo-eup | |
| Ipamhaburaempeu | 입암하부램프 | Dudong-ro | Ulsan | Ulju County Beomseo-eup | |
| Cheonsanghaburaempeu | 천상하부램프 | Cheonsangjungang-gil; Songhyeon-gil | Ulsan | Ulju County Beomseo-eup | |
| Guyeonggyohaburaempeu (Guyeong Overpass) | 구영교하부램프 (구영육교) | Daeri-ro | Ulsan | Ulju County Beomseo-eup | |
| Janggeomma-eul (Janggeom IC) | 장검마을 (장검 나들목) | Ulsan Expressway; Janggeom-gil | Ulsan | Ulju County Beomseo-eup | |
| Gulhwama-eul | 굴화마을 | | Ulsan | Ulju County Beomseo-eup | |
| Gulhwa IS | 굴화삼거리 | Gulhwa 1-gil | Ulsan | Ulju County Beomseo-eup | |
| Gangbyeon Greenville | 강변그린빌앞 | Gulhwa 3-gil | Ulsan | Nam District | |
| Munsugoap (Munsu High School) | 문수고앞 (문수고등학교) | Gulhwa 4-gil | Ulsan | Nam District | |
| Samhogyonam IS | 삼호교남 교차로 | National Route 7 National Route 14 (Bukbusunhwan-doro); Namsal-ro | Ulsan | Nam District | Terminus |
