= National Route 58 (South Korea) =

Road in South Korea

National Route 58
- 국도 제58호선

Route information
- Length: 82.8 km (51.4 mi)
- Existed: 25 August 2001–present

Major junctions
- West end: Jinhae District, Changwon, South Gyeongsang Province
- East end: Cheongdo County, North Gyeongsang Province

Location
- Country: South Korea

Highway system
- Highway systems of South Korea; Expressways; National; Local

National Route 58 is a national highway in South Korea connects Changwon to Cheongdo County. It was established on 25 August 2001.

== Main stopovers ==
South Gyeongsang Province

- Jinhae District, Changwon

Busan

- Gangseo District

South Gyeongsang Province

- Gimhae - Miryang

North Gyeongsang Province

- Cheongdo County

== Major intersections ==
- (■): Motorway

IS: Intersection, IC: Interchange

=== South Gyeongsang Province·Busan ===
Name	Hangul name	Connection	Location		Note
Macheon Overpass	마천육교	National Route 2 National Route 77 (Jinhae-daero)	Changwon City	Jinhae District	Terminus
Ungdong IC	웅동 나들목	National Route 2 National Route 77 (Jinhae-daero)	Changwon City	Jinhae District	
Sosa IC	소사 나들목	Sosa-Noksan Motorway	Changwon City	Jinhae District	
Ungdong Tunnel	웅동터널		Changwon City	Jinhae District	Approximately 2112m
Ungdong Tunnel			Busan	Gangseo District	Approximately 2112m
Jisa IC	지사 나들목	Gwahaksandan-ro	Busan	Gangseo District	
Jisa Tunnel	지사터널		Busan	Gangseo District	Approximately 1270m
Jisa Tunnel			Gimhae City	Jangyu-dong	Approximately 1270m
Jangyu IS	장유 교차로	Yulha-ro	Gimhae City	Jangyu-dong	
Eungdal IS	응달 교차로	Jangyu-ro	Gimhae City	Jangyu-dong	
Idong IS	이동 교차로	Prefectural Route 1020 (Chilsan-ro)	Gimhae City	Chilsan Seobu-dong	
Pungyu IS	풍유 교차로	Geumgwan-daero	Gimhae City	Chilsan Seobu-dong	
Nongso IS	농소 교차로	National Route 14 (Dongseo-daero)	Gimhae City	Juchon-myeon	Under construction National Route 14 overlap
Juchon IS	주촌 교차로	Prefectural Route 1042 (Seobu-ro)	Gimhae City	Juchon-myeon	National Route 14 overlap
No name	(이름 없음)	National Route 14 (Dongseo-daero)	Gimhae City	Juchon-myeon	Under construction National Route 14 overlap
Daeri IS	대리 교차로		Gimhae City	Juchon-myeon	Under construction
(Tunnel)	(터널)		Gimhae City	Juchon-myeon	Under construction
Samgye IS	삼계 교차로	Saengnim-daero	Gimhae City	Samgye-dong	Under construction
Nabatgogae IS	나밭고개사거리	Najeon-ro	Gimhae City	Saengnim-myeon	
Harajeon IS	하라전 교차로	Najeon-ro 249beon-gil	Gimhae City	Saengnim-myeon	
Sachon IS	사촌삼거리	Prefectural Route 60 (Najeon-ro)	Gimhae City	Saengnim-myeon	Prefectural Route 60 overlap
Sachon IS	사촌 교차로	Prefectural Route 60	Gimhae City	Saengnim-myeon	Under construction
Bongnim IS	봉림 교차로	Prefectural Route 60 (Bongnim-ro)	Gimhae City	Saengnim-myeon	Prefectural Route 60 overlap
Bongnim IS	봉림삼거리	Bongnim-ro	Gimhae City	Saengnim-myeon	
Saengcheol IS	생철 교차로	Masa-ro	Gimhae City	Saengnim-myeon	
Masa IS	마사 교차로	Masa-ro	Gimhae City	Saengnim-myeon	
Samnangjin Bridge	삼랑진교		Gimhae City	Saengnim-myeon	
Samnangjin Bridge			Miryang City	Samnangjin-eup	
Samnangjin Bridge IS	삼랑진교 교차로	Prefectural Route 1022 (Samnangjin-ro)	Miryang City	Samnangjin-eup	Prefectural Route 1022 overlap
Nakdonggang station	낙동강역		Miryang City	Samnangjin-eup	Prefectural Route 1022 overlap
Songjin Elementary School	송진초등학교		Miryang City	Samnangjin-eup	Prefectural Route 1022 overlap
Songji IS	송지사거리	Prefectural Route 1022 (Cheontae-ro)	Miryang City	Samnangjin-eup	Prefectural Route 1022 overlap
Samnangjin IC	삼랑진 나들목	Jungang Expressway	Miryang City	Samnangjin-eup	
Majeon IS	마전삼거리	Sangsam-ro	Miryang City	Samnangjin-eup	
Saenarugogae	새나루고개		Miryang City	Samnangjin-eup	
Pusan National University Miryang Campus Sungjin Elementary School Samnangjin-eup Welfare Center Imcheon Branch	부산대학교 밀양캠퍼스 숭진초등학교 삼랑진읍행정복지센터임천출장소		Miryang City	Samnangjin-eup	
Meongesil Entrance	멍에실입구	Meongesil-ro	Miryang City	Gagok-dong	
Wongok Underpass	원곡지하차도		Miryang City	Gagok-dong	
Miryang station	밀양역	Yeogapgwangjang-ro	Miryang City	Gagok-dong	
Gagok IS	가곡삼거리	Jungang-ro	Miryang City	Gagok-dong	
Yerim Bridge	예림교		Miryang City	Gagok-dong	
Yerim IS	예림사거리	National Route 25 (Miryang-daero); Yangnimganjebang-gil	Miryang City	Sangnam-myeon	National Route 25 overlap
Maam IS	마암 교차로	National Route 25 (Miryang-daero)	Miryang City	Bubuk-myeon	National Route 25 overlap
Sapo IS	사포 교차로	Saposandanjungang-ro	Miryang City	Bubuk-myeon	
Jeonsapo IS	전사포 교차로	Sapojungang-gil; Dongam 3-gil	Miryang City	Bubuk-myeon	
Husapo IS	후사포 교차로	Yerimseowon-ro	Miryang City	Bubuk-myeon	
Songak IS	송악 교차로	Songpo-ro	Miryang City	Bubuk-myeon	
Jedae IS	제대 교차로	Prefectural Route 1080 (Jeompiljae-ro)	Miryang City	Bubuk-myeon	
Unjeon IS	운전 교차로	National Route 24 (Changmil-ro)	Miryang City	Bubuk-myeon	National Route 24 overlap
Chunhwa Overpass	춘화육교	Chungi 3-gil	Miryang City	Bubuk-myeon	National Route 24 overlap
Chunhwa IS	춘화삼거리	National Route 24 (Changmil-ro)	Miryang City	Bubuk-myeon	National Route 24 overlap
Wiyangji	위양지		Miryang City	Bubuk-myeon	
Malchigogae	말치고개		Miryang City	Bubuk-myeon	Under construction
Malchigogae			Miryang City	Sangdong-myeon	Under construction
Yeosuma-eul	여수마을		Miryang City	Sangdong-myeon	One lane
(Oksanma-eul)	(옥산마을)	National Route 25 (Saemaeul-ro)	Miryang City	Sangdong-myeon	National Route 25 overlap
Oksan IS	옥산삼거리	National Route 25 (Saemaeul-ro)	Miryang City	Sangdong-myeon	National Route 25 overlap
Yucheon Bridge	유천교		Miryang City	Sangdong-myeon	Continuation into North Gyeongsang Province

=== North Gyeongsang Province ===
Name	Hangul name	Connection	Location		Note
Yucheon Bridge	유천교		Cheongdo County	Cheongdo-eup	South Gyeongsang Province - North Gyeongsang Province border line
No name	(이름 없음)	Guchon 2-gil Jijeon-gil	Cheongdo County	Maejeon-myeon	
Maejeon Elementary School	매전초등학교		Cheongdo County	Maejeon-myeon	
Maejeon IS	매전삼거리	National Route 20 (Cheongnyeo-ro)	Cheongdo County	Maejeon-myeon	Terminus
