= Jungang Expressway =

Road in South Korea

Expressway No.55
- Jungang Expressway 중앙고속도로

Route information
- Length: 388.1 km (241.2 mi)

Major junctions
- South end: Sasang-gu, Busan; Gwanmun-daero
- North end: Chuncheon, Gangwon Province; National Route 5

Location
- Country: South Korea
- Major cities: Andong, Yeongju, Jecheon, Wonju

Highway system
- Highway systems of South Korea; Expressways; National; Local

- Jungang Expressway
- Hangul: 중앙고속도로
- Hanja: 中央高速道路
- RR: Jungang gosok doro
- MR: Chungang kosok toro

The Jungang Expressway (Korean: 중앙고속도로) is an expressway in South Korea. Its name literally means "Central Expressway," and for much of its length it runs through mountainous terrain near the country's east-west center line, including the national parks of Chiaksan and Sobaeksan. It covers a total distance of roughly 388.1 kilometers.

The southern end is in Sasang-gu, Busan, although for much of the distance between Busan and Daegu it runs together with the Gyeongbu Expressway. Its northern end is in Chuncheon, Gangwon Province. The expressway was completed in December 2001.

There is also a short branch named Jungang Expressway Branch near the southern end. This is numbered 551.

Chuncheon ~ Cheorwon section (63.0 km) is on the drawing boards.

== History ==
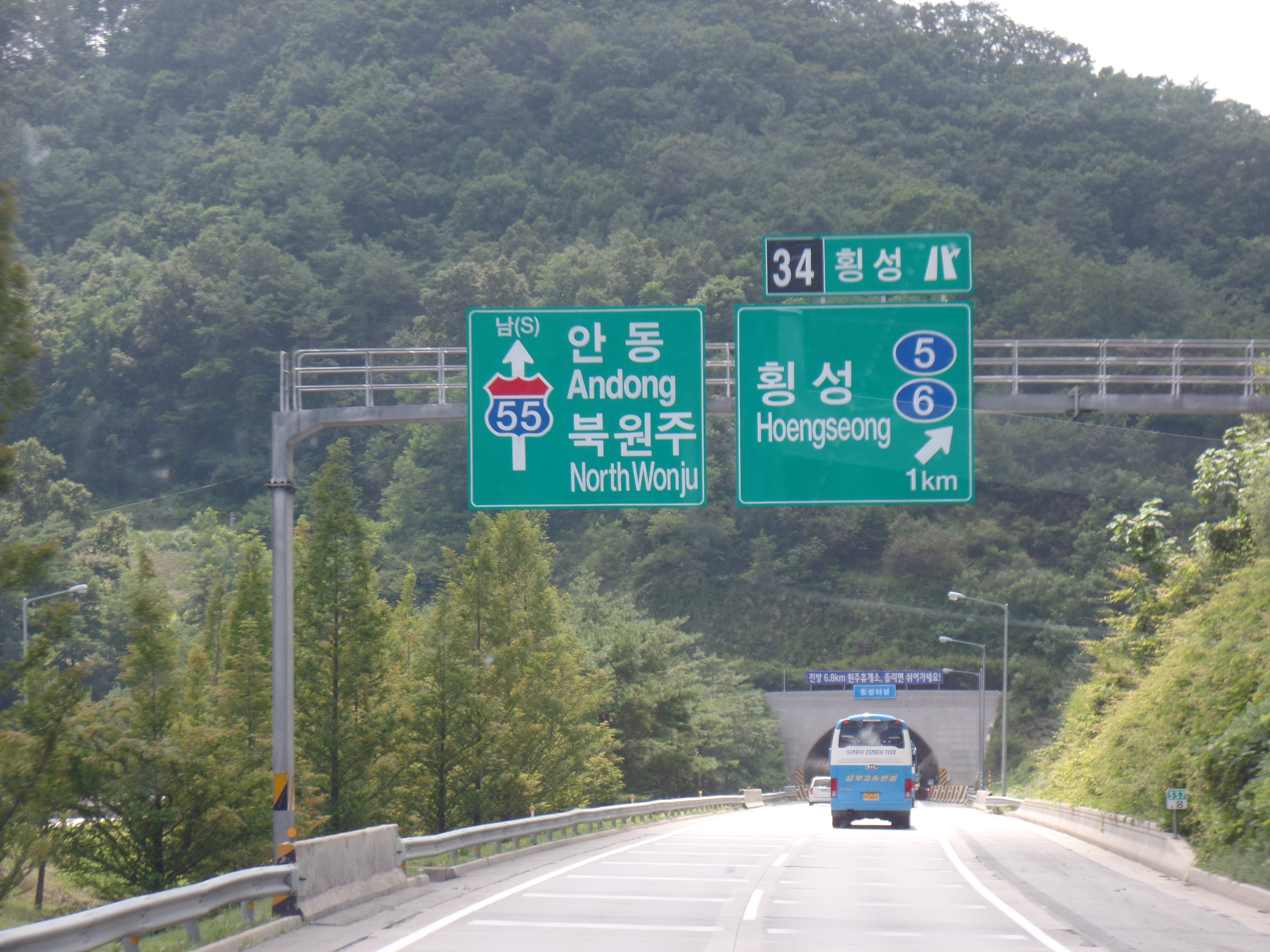
Hoengseong IC sign.

- September 20, 1989 : Under Construction (Chuncheon ~ Daegu)
- December 15, 1994 : Geumho JCT ~ Chilgok (6.1 km), S.Wonju ~ Manjong JCT (6.2 km) section opened the traffic. (2 Lanes)
- August 29, 1995 : Chilgok ~ W.Andong (79.8 km), S.Jecheon ~ S.Wonju (30.1 km), Hongcheon~Chuncheon (25.2 km) Section opened the traffic. (2 Lanes)
- July 1, 1999 : Gangseo Nakdongganggyo (br) (강서낙동강교, 1.6 km) opened the traffic.
- September 16, 1999 : W.Andong ~ Yeongju section opened the traffic.
- June 1, 2000 : Chilgok ~ W.Andong, Yeongju ~ Punggi (9.5 km), Jecheon ~ S.Wonju (37.6 km), Hongcheon ~ Chuncheon (26.2 km) opened the traffic. (4 Lanes)
- February 12, 2001 : construction began on the Daegu-Busan Expressway segment
- August 17, 2001 : Manjong JCT ~ Hongcheon (42.5 km) opened the traffic.
- December 14, 2001 : Punggi ~ Jecheon (51.2 km) opened the traffic.
- January 2005 : East Daegu Junction ~ East Daegu IC Section opened the traffic.
- January 15, 2006 : East Daegu JCT ~ Daedong JCT (Daegu-Busan Expressway) section opened the traffic.

== Information ==
=== Lanes ===
- Samnak IC ~ Chojeong IC, Daedong JC ~ E.Daegu JC, Geumho JC ~ Chuncheon IC : 4 Lanes
- Chojeong IC ~ Daedong JC : 6 Lanes
- E.Daegu JC ~ Geumho JC : 8 Lanes

=== Lengths ===
- Total: 388.10 km

=== Speed limit ===
- Samnak IC ~ Daedong JC, E.Daegu JC ~ Chuncheon IC : 100 km/h
- Daedong IC ~ E.Daegu JC: 110 km/h

== Daegu–Busan Expressway ==
- Jungang Expressway
- Hangul: 대구부산고속도로
- Hanja: 大邱釜山高速道路
- RR: Daegu Busan gosok doro
- MR: Taegu Pusan kosok toro

The Daegu–Busan Expressway is a segment of the Jungang Expressway which runs north from Daegu to Busan. Officially, it is part of the Jungang Expressway, but some maps use this name for this section. The estimated travel time between the two cities is roughly 1 hour, saving about half an hour over the previous travel time on the Gyeongbu Expressway. The toll for a passenger car is 8,500 won, slightly less than the cost of a KTX ticket between the two cities.

Construction was completed in February 2006, at a total cost of slightly over 1 trillion won. The project was overseen by Hyundai Development Company, also known as I-Park, which has promoted the project under the name "I-Way." It was heavily supported by loans from the Korean Road Infrastructure Fund operated by Australia's Macquarie Bank. The term of the financing is 30 years.

It has 4 lanes over a length of 82.05 km with a speed limit of 100 km/h.

== List of facilities ==
- IC: Interchange, JC: Junction, SA: Service Area, TG:Tollgate
  - Blue Section (■): reiteration section of Gyeongbu Expressway ( AH 1)
  - (■): Daegu-Busan Expressway

No.	Name	Korean name	Hanja name	Connections	Notes	Location	
Connected directly with Gwanmun-daero (관문대로)
	Busan	부산 시점	釜山 始點	Gwanmun-daero (Busan Metropolitan City Route 33)	Expressway Start Spot	Sasang	Busan
1	Samnak IC	삼락나들목	三樂나들목	Gangbyeon-daero (Busan Metropolitan City Route 66)		Sasang	Busan
1	Gimhae Airport IC	김해공항나들목	金海空港	National Route 14; Gonghang-ro; Gimhae International Airport		Gangseo	Busan
2	Daejeo JC	대저분기점	大渚分岐點	Namhae Expressway; National Route 14		Gangseo	Busan
2-1	Chojeong IC	초정나들목	草亭나들목	Local Route 69		Gimhae	Gyeongnam
2-2	Daedong IC	대동나들목	大東나들목	Local Route 69		Gimhae	Gyeongnam
2-2	Daedong TG	대동요금소	大東料金所		Main Tollgate	Gimhae	Gyeongnam
2-3	Daegam JC	대감분기점	大甘分岐點	Busan Ring Expressway		Gimhae	Gyeongnam
3	Daedong JC	대동분기점	大東分岐點	Jungang Expressway Branch		Gimhae	Gyeongnam
TG	Gimhae·Busan TG	김해·부산요금소	金海·釜山料金所		Main Tollate	Gimhae	Gyeongnam
4	Sangdong IC	상동나들목	上東나들목	Local Route 60		Gimhae	Gyeongnam
5	Samnangjin IC	삼랑진나들목	三浪津나들목	National Route 58		Milyang	Gyeongnam
6	S. Milyang IC	남밀양나들목	南密陽나들목	National Route 25		Milyang	Gyeongnam
7	Milyang IC	밀양나들목	密陽나들목	National Route 24		Milyang	Gyeongnam
7-1	Milyang JC	밀양분기점	密陽分岐點	Hamyang-Ulsan Expressway		Milyang	Gyeongnam
SA	Cheongdo Saemaeul SA	청도새마을휴게소	淸道새마을休憩所			Cheongdo	Gyeongnam
8	Cheongdo IC	청도나들목	淸道나들목	National Route 20, National Route 25		Cheongdo	Gyeongnam
9	Suseong IC	수성나들목	壽城나들목	National Route 25		Suseong	Daegu
TG	Daegu TG	대구요금소	大邱料金所		Main Tollate	Suseong	Daegu
10	E. Daegu IC	동대구나들목	東大邱나들목	National Route 4		Dong-gu	Daegu
11	E. Daegu JC	동대구분기점	東大邱分岐點	Gyeongbu Expressway ( AH 1); Daegu Ring Expressway (Sangmae JC Branch)		Dong-gu	Daegu
12	Dodong JC	도동분기점	道洞分岐點	Iksan-Pohang Expressway; Daegu International Airport		Dong-gu	Daegu
13	N. Daegu IC	북대구나들목	北大邱나들목	National Route 4 National Route 5 Sincheon-daero; Seobyeonnam-ro		Buk-gu	Daegu
14	Geumho JC	금호분기점	琴湖分岐點	Gyeongbu Expressway ( AH 1); Jungbu Naeryuk Expressway Branch		Buk-gu	Daegu
15	Chilgok IC	칠곡나들목	漆谷나들목	National Route 4 National Route 5 National Route 25		Buk-gu	Daegu
15-1	Dongmyeong·Dongho JC	동명동호분기점	東明東湖分岐點	Daegu Ring Expressway		Buk-gu	Daegu
SA	Dongmyeong SA	동명휴게소	東明休憩所			Chilgok	Gyeongbuk
16	Dabu IC	다부나들목	多富나들목	National Route 5 National Route 25		Chilgok	Gyeongbuk
17	Gasan IC	가산나들목	架山나들목	National Route 5 National Route 25		Chilgok	Gyeongbuk
17-1	Gunwi JC	군위분기점	軍威分岐點	Sangju-Yeongcheon Expressway		Gunwi	Daegu
18	Gunwi IC	군위나들목	軍威나들목	National Route 5 National Route 67		Gunwi	Daegu
SA	Gunwi SA	군위휴게소	軍威休憩所			Gunwi	Daegu
19	Uiseong IC	의성나들목	義城나들목	National Route 5		Uiseong	Gyeongbuk
20	Andong JC	안동분기점	安東分岐點	Dangjin-Yeongdeok Expressway		Andong	Gyeongbuk
21	S. Andong IC	남안동나들목	南安東나들목	Local Route 914		Andong	Gyeongbuk
SA	Andong SA	안동휴게소	安東休憩所			Andong	Gyeongbuk
22	W. Andong IC	서안동나들목	西安東나들목	National Route 34		Andong	Gyeongbuk
23	Yecheon IC	예천나들목	醴泉나들목	Local Route 928		Yecheon	Gyeongbuk
24	Yeongju IC	영주나들목	榮州나들목	National Route 28		Yeongju	Gyeongbuk
SA	Yeongju SA	영주휴게소	榮州休憩所			Yeongju	Gyeongbuk
25	Punggi IC	풍기나들목	豊基나들목	National Route 5 National Route 36		Yeongju	Gyeongbuk
26	Danyang IC	단양나들목	丹陽나들목	National Route 5 National Route 36		Danyang	Chungbuk
SA	Danyang SA	단양휴게소	丹陽休憩所			Danyang	Chungbuk
27	N. Danyang IC	북단양나들목	北丹陽나들목	Local Route 532		Danyang	Chungbuk
28	S. Jecheon IC	남제천나들목	南堤川나들목	Local Route 82		Jecheon	Chungbuk
28-1	Jecheon JC	제천분기점	堤川分岐點	Pyeongtaek–Jecheon Expressway		Jecheon	Chungbuk
SA	Jecheon SA	제천휴게소	堤川休憩所			Jecheon	Chungbuk
29	Jecheon IC	제천나들목	堤川나들목	National Route 5 National Route 38		Jecheon	Chungbuk
30	Sillim IC	신림나들목	神林나들목	National Route 5		Wonju	Gangwon
SA	Chiak SA	치악휴게소	雉岳休憩所			Wonju	Gangwon
31	S. Wonju IC	남원주나들목	南原州나들목	National Route 19		Wonju	Gangwon
32	Manjong JC	만종분기점	萬鍾分岐點	Yeongdong Expressway		Wonju	Gangwon
32-1	Sinpyeong JC	신평분기점	新坪分岐點	Gwangju-Wonju Expressway		Wonju	Gangwon
33	N. Wonju IC	북원주나들목	北原州나들목	National Route 5 National Route 19		Wonju	Gangwon
SA	Wonju SA	원주휴게소	原州休憩所			Wonju	Gangwon
34	Hoengseong IC	횡성나들목	橫城나들목	National Route 5 National Route 6 Wonju Airport		Hoengseong	Gangwon
35	Hongcheon IC	홍천나들목	洪川나들목	National Route 44		Hongcheon	Gangwon
SA	Hongcheongang SA	홍천강휴게소	洪川江休憩所		Chuncheon-bound; Only	Hongcheon	Gangwon
36	Chuncheon JC	춘천분기점	春川分岐點	Seoul-Yangyang Expressway		Chuncheon	Gangwon
SA	Chuncheon SA	춘천휴게소	春川休憩所			Chuncheon	Gangwon
TG	Chuncheon TG	춘천요금소	春川料金所		Main Tollgate	Chuncheon	Gangwon
37	Chuncheon IC	춘천나들목	春川나들목	National Route 46		Chuncheon	Gangwon
	Chuncheon	춘천 종점	春川 終點	National Route 5	Expressway Ending Spot	Chuncheon	Gangwon

== See also ==
- Roads and expressways in South Korea
- Transportation in South Korea

== See also ==
- Roads and expressways in South Korea
- Transportation in South Korea
- Jungang Line (railroad)
