= Chilgok County =

Coordinates: 35°57′N 128°32′E

Chilgok
- County
- Flag Emblem of Chilgok

- Location in South Korea
- Country: South Korea
- Region: Yeongnam
- Administrative divisions: 3 eup, 5 myeon

Area
  - Total: 451 km^{2} (174 sq mi)

Population (August 2025)
  - Total: 105,308
  - Density: 237.6/km^{2} (615/sq mi)
  - Dialect: Gyeongsang

Korean name
- Hangul: 칠곡군
- Hanja: 漆谷郡
- RR: Chilgok-gun
- MR: Ch'ilgok-kun

Chilgok County (Korean: 칠곡군) is in southwest North Gyeongsang Province, South Korea. It is near Gunwi County to the east and adjoins Gimchon-si, Seongju County to the west. The county is administratively divided into three towns and five townships. The county seat is Waegwan, located along the Nakdong River, which is crossed by rail, road, and pedestrian bridges.

== Geography and climate ==
Its geographical coordinate is 128°18'-128°38' to the east longitude and the north latitude 35°52' - 36°38' with average temperature of 14.8 °C and 948mm amount of rainfall. Chilgok County borders Gunwi-gun and Daegu to the east, Seongju-gun and Gimcheon-si to the west, Daegu to the south, and Gumi to the northwest. The county has a continental inland climate, with cold winters and hot summers. The average annual temperature is 12.8 °C, ranging from -2.1 °C in January to 26.5 °C in August, with average annual rainfall of 993.9 mm.

== History ==
Chilgok has played an important role in Korean history, particularly during the Joseon Dynasty and the Korean War. During war, the county was strategically significant in defending the Pusan Perimeter along the Nakdong River, with many lives lost in battles against North Korean forces.. The area is also home to Camp Carroll, a United States military base, and several war memorials.

== Landmarks and attractions ==
Notable sites in the county include:

- Gasansanseong Mountain Fortress, a Joseon-era fortress.
- Dabudong War Memorial Museum, commemorating the Battle of Dabudong.
- Chilgok Patriots & Peace Memorial, focusing on battles near the Nakdong River.
- Songjeong Recreational Forest, a popular site for camping and picnics.

== Administrative divisions ==
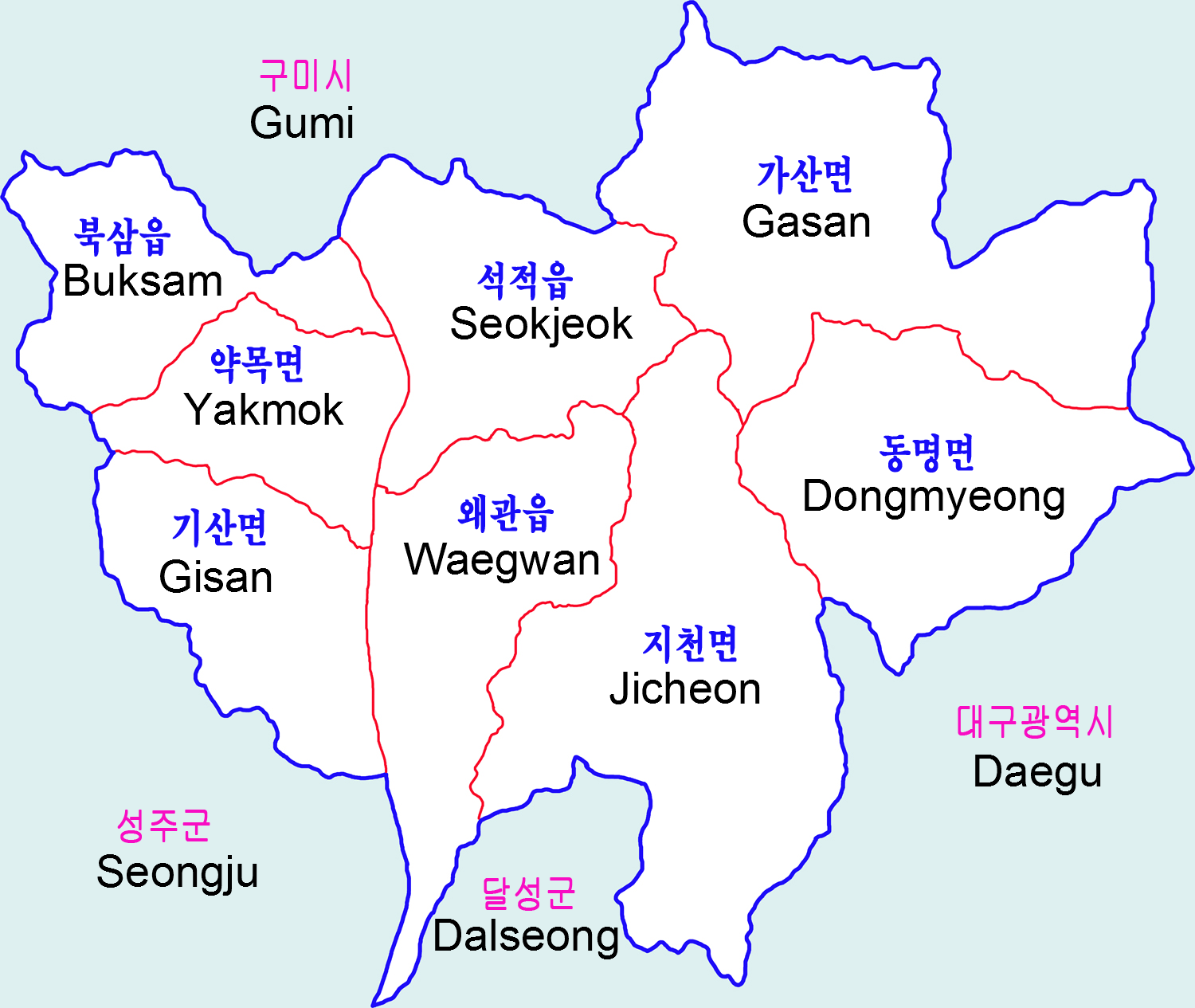
Map of Chilgok County

Chilgok County is divided into 3 eup and 5 myeon.

Name	Hangeul	Hanja
Waegwan-eup	왜관읍	倭館邑
Buksam-eup	북삼읍	北三邑
Seokjeok-eup	석적읍	石積邑
Jicheon-myeon	지천면	枝川面
Dongmyeong-myeon	동명면	東明面
Gasan-myeon	가산면	架山面
Yakmok-myeon	약목면	若木面
Gisan-myeon	기산면	岐山面
