= Special Metropolitan City roads of Seoul =

The Seoul Metropolitan City roads, known as 서울특별시도 in Korean (Seoulteukbyeolsido), is a form network of highways that cover the metropolitan region of Seoul. These highways are maintained and designated by urban municipalities and are distinguished from other road systems by their official number and guide number. The official numbering system is specifically used in the legal context, while the guide numbering system is utilized for signage and is widely acknowledged by the public.

== Classification ==
Seoul Metropolitan City roads consist of three categories: urban expressways (도시고속도로 in Korean), trunk routes (주간선도로 in Korean), and auxiliary routes (보조간선도로 in Korean).

=== Urban expressways ===
There are a total of 10 routes in the Seoul Metropolitan City road network, and some of these routes may overlap with each other.

| Official number | Guided number | Name | Korean name | Length (km) | Note |
|---|---|---|---|---|---|
| C3 | - | Seoul Inner Loop; Naebusunhwan-ro | 내부순환로 (내부순환도시고속도로) | 40.1 | |
| 01 | nr 1 | Seobu Ganseondoro; Seobuganseon-doro | 서부간선도로 (서부간선) | 16.8 | Portion of National Route 1 |
| 02 | | Dongbu Expressway; Dongbuganseon-doro | 동부간선도로 (동부간선) | 32.5 | overlap with National Route 46, Local Route 23 and Seoul City Expressway C3 |
| 03 | - | Bukbu Expressway; Bukbuganseon-doro | 북부간선도로 (북부간선) | 7.8 | |
| 04 | | Gangbyeon Northern Highway; Gangbyeonbuk-ro | 강변북로 | 29.0 | overlap with National Route 46, National Route 77 and Local Route 23; also signed as Seoul City Expressway C3 |
| 05 | | Olympic-daero; Olympic-daero | 올림픽대로 | 42.5 | |
| | ex 1 | Gyeongbu Urban Expressway; Gyeongbuganseon-doro | 경부간선도로 (경부간선) | 6.8 | Original routing of Gyeongbu Expressway into Seoul |
| 07 | cr 94 | Gangnam Beltway; Gangnamsunhwan-ro | 강남순환로 | 13.8 | |
| 08 | - | Shinwol-Yeoui Underpass; Sinwolyeoui-jihadololeul | 신월여의지하도로를 | 7.7 | Underground bypass of Gukhoe-daero |
| 09 | - | Western Arterial Underpass; Seobuganseon-jihadolo | 서부간선지하도로 | 9.0 | Underground bypass of Seobu Ganseondoro |

==== Other guided routes ====
| Number | Link | Length (km) | Note |
|---|---|---|---|
| cr 20 | Seoul City Route 20 | 21.3 | |
| cr 21 | Seoul City Route 21 | 24.2 | |
| cr 30 | Seoul City Route 30 | 22 | |
| cr 31 | Seoul City Route 31 | 17 | |
| cr 41 | Seoul City Route 41 | 27.5 | |
| cr 50 | Seoul City Route 50 | 30.4 | |
| cr 51 | Seoul City Route 51 | 31 | |
| cr 60 | Seoul City Route 60 | 33.6 | |
| cr 71 | Seoul City Route 71 | 18.7 | |
| cr 90 | Seoul City Route 90 | 28.3 | |
| cr 92 | Seoul City Route 92 | 44.6 | |

=== Trunk routes ===
| Number | Name | Korean name | Length (km) | Note |
|---|---|---|---|---|
| cr C1 | Downtown Ring Road | 도심순환도로 | 11.44 | Part of National Route 48 |
| cr 21 | Siheung-Jungnim Line | 시흥 ~ 중림선 | 17.69 | Part of National Route 1 |
| cr 22 | Sillim-Jingwan Inner Line | 신림 ~ 진관내선 | 22.6 | Part of National Route 1, overlaps Route C1 |
| cr 23 | Galhyeon-Jeokseon Line | | 9.7 | |
| cr 24 | Bongrae-Sejongro Line | | 2.24 | |
| cr 25 | Sadang-Seobinggo Line | | 8.25 | |
| cr 26 | Umyeon-Junghag Line | | 14.34 | |
| cr 27 | Jangji-Gahoe Line | | 21.22 | |
| cr 28 | Pildong-Dobong Line | | 16.48 | |
| cr 29 | Yangjae-Hyehwa Line | | 12.94 | |
| cr 30 | Naegok-Wolgok Line | | 19.56 | |
| cr 31 | Jangji-Seongsu Line | | 11.73 | |
| cr 32 | Segok-Sanggye Line | | 29.08 | |
| cr 41 | Umyeon-Suseo Line | | 9.18 | |
| cr 42 | Banghwa-Sagajeong Line | | 51.76 | |
| cr 43 | Sinjeong-Bongcheon Line | | 9.8 | |
| cr 44 | Sadang-Amsa Line | | 17.07 | |
| cr 45 | Gwahae-Samsung Line | | 26.84 | Unsigned; overlaps National Route 6, National Route 47, National Route 77 and Seoul City Route 23 |
| cr 46 | Yangpyeong-Nogosan Line | | 5.64 | |
| cr 47 | Gongdeok-Penglai Line | | 2.56 | |
| cr 48 | Eulji-Dunchon Line | | 16.24 | |
| cr 49 | Sinwol-Sindang Line | | 17.05 | Overlaps National Route 6 |
| cr 50 | Seorin-Sangil Line | | 19.85 | |
| cr 51 | Onsu-Mangu Line | | 30.27 | Unsigned; overlaps National Route 6 and National Route 47 |
| cr 52 | Sinseol-Gongneung Line | | 11.03 | |
| cr 53 | Gayang-Hyeonjeo Line | | 12.24 | |

=== Auxiliary routes ===
==== Three-digit routes ====
| Number | Name | Korean name | Via road | Length (km) | Note |
|---|---|---|---|---|---|
| cr 101 | Gwangmyeong-Siheung Line | 광명 - 시흥선 | Kia-ro | 0.35 | |
| cr 103 | Siheung-Sillim Line | 시흥 - 신림선 | Geumha-ro, Hoam-ro | 6.29 | |
| cr 105 | Siheung Line | 시흥선 | Hoam-ro | 1.28 | |
| cr 107 | Garibong-Doksan Line | 가리봉 - 독산선 | Beoman-ro | 1.72 | |
| cr 111 | Seongsan-Jingwan Line | | Nongsusansijang-ro, World Cup-ro, Jeungsan-ro, Yeonseo-ro | 12.56 | Part of National Route 1 |
| cr 112 | Sangam Line | | World Cup Bridge, Jeungsan-ro | 3.29 | |
| cr 113 | Seongsan-Hongje Line | | Nongsusansijang-ro, World Cup-ro, Sandnae-ro | 5.69 | |
| cr 115 | Sangam-Daeheung Line | | World Cup-ro, Dokmak-ro, Daeheung-ro | 8.73 | |
| cr 117 | Sangam-Seogyo Line | | Worldcupbuk-ro, Hongik-ro | 5.53 | |
| cr 119 | Sangam-Seongsan Line | | Sungam-ro | 3.65 | |
| cr 121 | Jeungsan-Yeonhui Line | | Jeungga-ro | 2.70 | |
| cr 123 | Sinsa-Hongeun Line | | Gajwa-ro | 4.21 | |
| cr 125 | Seooleung-Jingwanoe Line | | Jingwan 1-ro | 1.04 | |
| cr 127 | Jingwannae-Jingwanoe Line | | Bukhansan-ro | 2.19 | |
| cr 301 | Wolgog Line | | Opaesan-ro | 0.90 | |
| cr 401 | Cheong-Wonhyo Line | | Wonhyo-ro | 0.70 | |
| cr 403 | Seongsu Line | | Wangsimni-ro | 0.41 | |
| cr 405 | Noyu-Junggog Line | | Neungdong-ro | 4.51 | |
| cr 407 | Jamsil Railway Bridge | | Jamsil Railway Bridge, Gangbyeon Station Road | 2.04 | |
| cr 501 | Jamsil-Bangi Line | | Baekje Gobun-ro | 5.15 | |

==== 2000-3000 series ====
| Number | Name | Korean name | Via road | Length (km) | Note |
|---|---|---|---|---|---|
| cr 2101 | Siheung-Doksan Main Line | | Doksan-ro | 3.70 | |
| cr 2103 | Doksan-Deungchon Main Line | | Gasan-ro, Nambusunhwan-ro, Gurodong-ro, Gurojungang-ro, Mokdong-ro, Deungchon-ro | 10.06 | Duplicates City Route 42 |
| cr 2105 | Doksan-Bongcheon Line | | Munseong-ro, Sillim-ro, Ssukgogae-ro | 4.38 | Overlaps City Route 4223 |
| cr 2107 | Garibong-Singil Line | | Gamasan-ro | 5.38 | |
| cr 2109 | Daelim-Yeongdeungpo Line | | Singil-ro | 2.95 | |
| cr 2111 | Yeouido Line | | Yeouidong-ro, Yeouiseo-ro | 7.20 | |
| cr 2112 | Yeouido Dunchi Line | | Yeoui Interchange entrance and exit road | 3.85 | |
| cr 2113 | Uisadang-daero | | Uisadang-daero | 1.63 | |
| cr 2115 | Bongrae-Gwanhun Line | | Chilpae-ro, Sejong-daero, Namdaemun-ro, Ujeongguk-ro | 2.61 | Duplicates City Routes 24 and C1 |
| cr 2201 | Sangdo-Sadang Line | | Sadang-ro | 2.35 | |
| cr 2203 | Yongsan-Seobingo Line | | Seobinggo-ro | 2.68 | Duplicates City Route 25 |
| cr 2205 | Galwol-Dongja Line | | Duteopbawi-ro, Hoam-ro | 1.78 | |
| cr 2207 | Hannam-Taepyeong Line | | Sowol-ro | 3.78 | |
| cr 2209 | Namchang-Namsan Line | | Sopa-ro | 1.41 | |
| cr 2301 | Yeokchon-Nokbeon Line | | Seooreung-ro, Eunpyeong-ro | 1.32 | |
| cr 2303 | Palpan-Hyoja Line | | Cheongwa-daero, Hyoja-ro | 1.00 | |
| cr 2305 | Yeokchon-Daejo Line | | Jinheung-ro | 1.90 | Duplicates City Route 23 |
| cr 2501 | Yongsan-Seongsu Line | | Seobinggo-ro, Ttukseom-ro | 1.00 | Former portion of Gangbyeon North Road |
| cr 2503 | Kumho-Cheong Line | | Kumho-ro, Cheonggu-ro | 2.27 | |
| cr 2601 | Seocho-Cheongdam Line | | Saimdang-ro, Yeoksam-ro | 6.29 | |
| cr 2603 | Namsan Tunnel 2 Line | | Noksapyeong-daero 58-gil | 1.93 | |
| cr 2701 | Sinsa-Cheongdam Line | | Dosan-daero | 3.00 | |
| cr 2702 | Wirye Tunnel Line | | Wirye Tunnel | 2.27 | |
| cr 2703 | Hannam-Eungbong Line | | Dogseodang-ro | 4.95 | |
| cr 2705 | Chungmu-Nakwon Line | | Supyo-ro | 1.23 | |
| cr 2707 | Pildong-Waryong Line | | Chungmu-ro, Donhwamun-ro | 1.87 | |
| cr 2709 | Jeodong-Eulji Line | | Mareunnae-ro | 1.73 | |
| cr 2801 | Dongseon-Jeongleung Line | | Alilang-ro | 1.51 | |
| cr 2803 | Donam-Changdong Line | | Samyang-ro, Haedeung-ro | 9.83 | |
| cr 2805 | Mia-Sanggye Line | | Wolgye-ro, Hangeulbiseok-ro | 9.79 | |
| cr 2807 | Jeongneung-Beondong Line | | Bogukmun-ro, Solsaem-ro, Ohyeon-ro | 6.51 | |
| cr 2809 | Mia-Suyu Line | | Insubong-ro | 3.15 | |
| cr 2811 | Suyu-Sanggye Line | | Deokneung-ro | 9.82 | |
| cr 2813 | Suyu-Sanggye 7 Line | | Nohae-ro | 5.19 | |
| cr 2815 | Ssangmun-Dobong Line | | Sirubong-ro | 3.10 | |
| cr 2817 | Gongneung-Uiseon Line | | Nowon-ro, Banghak-ro | 10.87 | |
| cr 2819 | Dobong Station Line | | Dobong-ro 170-gil, Dongil-ro 243-gil | 0.99 | Overlaps National Route 3 |
| cr 2821 | Dobongsan Entrance Line | | Dobongsan Road | 0.53 | |
| cr 2901 | Hannam-Gwanghui Line | | Jangchungdan-ro | 2.15 | |
| cr 3001 | Seongsu-dong 1-ga Line | | Gwangnaru-ro | 1.33 | |
| cr 3003 | Heungin-Myeonmok Line | | Majang-ro, Sagajeong-ro | 7.75 | |
| cr 3005 | Majang-Sagun Line | | Salgoji-gil, Majolo | 5.22 | |
| cr 3007 | Jongam-Hoegi Line | | Hoe-ro | 1.66 | |
| cr 3009 | Geumho-Haengdang Line | | Haengdang-ro | 1.33 | |
| cr 3101 | Jangji-Geoyeo Line | | Wiryeseo-ro, Yangsan-ro | 1.38 | |
| cr 3102 | Jangji-Munjeong Line | | Wirye Jungang-ro, Tancheondong-ro | 3.81 | |
| cr 3103 | Munjeong-Godeok Line | | Chungmin-ro 2-gil, Saemal-ro 8-gil, Munjeong-ro 4-gil, Songi-ro 32-gil, Dongnam-ro 12-gil, Dongnam-ro | 9.82 | |
| cr 3105 | Sincheon-dong Line | | Olympic-ro 35-gil | 1.51 | |
| cr 3107 | Guui-Gwangjang Line | | Achasan-ro | 3.88 | Overlaps National Route 43 and National Route 46 |
| cr 3109 | Guui Line | | Jayang-ro | 1.69 | Overlaps National Route 3 |
| cr 3111 | Seongsu-Jayang Line | | Ttukseom-ro | 5.50 | |
| cr 3201 | Myeonmok-Sangbong Line | | Myeonmokcheon-ro, Mangwu-ro 52-gil | 1.65 | |
| cr 3203 | Hwigyeong-Myeonmok Line | | Gyeomjae-ro | 2.64 | |
| cr 3205 | Bongujae Line | | Bongujae-ro | 2.40 | |
| cr 3207 | Imun-Sinnae Line | | Hancheon-ro 58-gil, Bonghwasan-ro | 4.06 | |
| cr 3209 | Nowon Station-Buramsan Station Line | | Sanggye-ro | 3.15 | |
| cr 3211 | Jagok-Moonjeong Line | | Jagok-ro, Saemal-ro | 1.74 | |
