= Naebu Expressway =

Road in South Korea

Seoul Special Metropolitan City Route 30
- 서울특별시도 제30호선
- Naebu Expressway 내부순환로

Route information
- Length: 22 km (14 mi)
- Existed: 1995–present

Major junctions
- From: Mapo District, Seoul
- To: Seongdong District, Seoul

Location
- Country: South Korea

Highway system
- Highway systems of South Korea; Expressways; National; Local

Naebu Expressway (Korean: 내부순환로) is a highway located in Seoul, South Korea. It is part of Seoul City Route C3. With a total length of 22 km (14 mi), this road starts from the north end of Seongsan Bridge to Seongdong Bridge through Hongjimun Tunnel and Jeongneung Tunnel. The inner loop runs concurrently with Gangbyeon Expressway for 18.33 km and Dongbu Expressway for 2.04 km.

== History ==
This route was established on 31 October 1995

== Stopovers ==
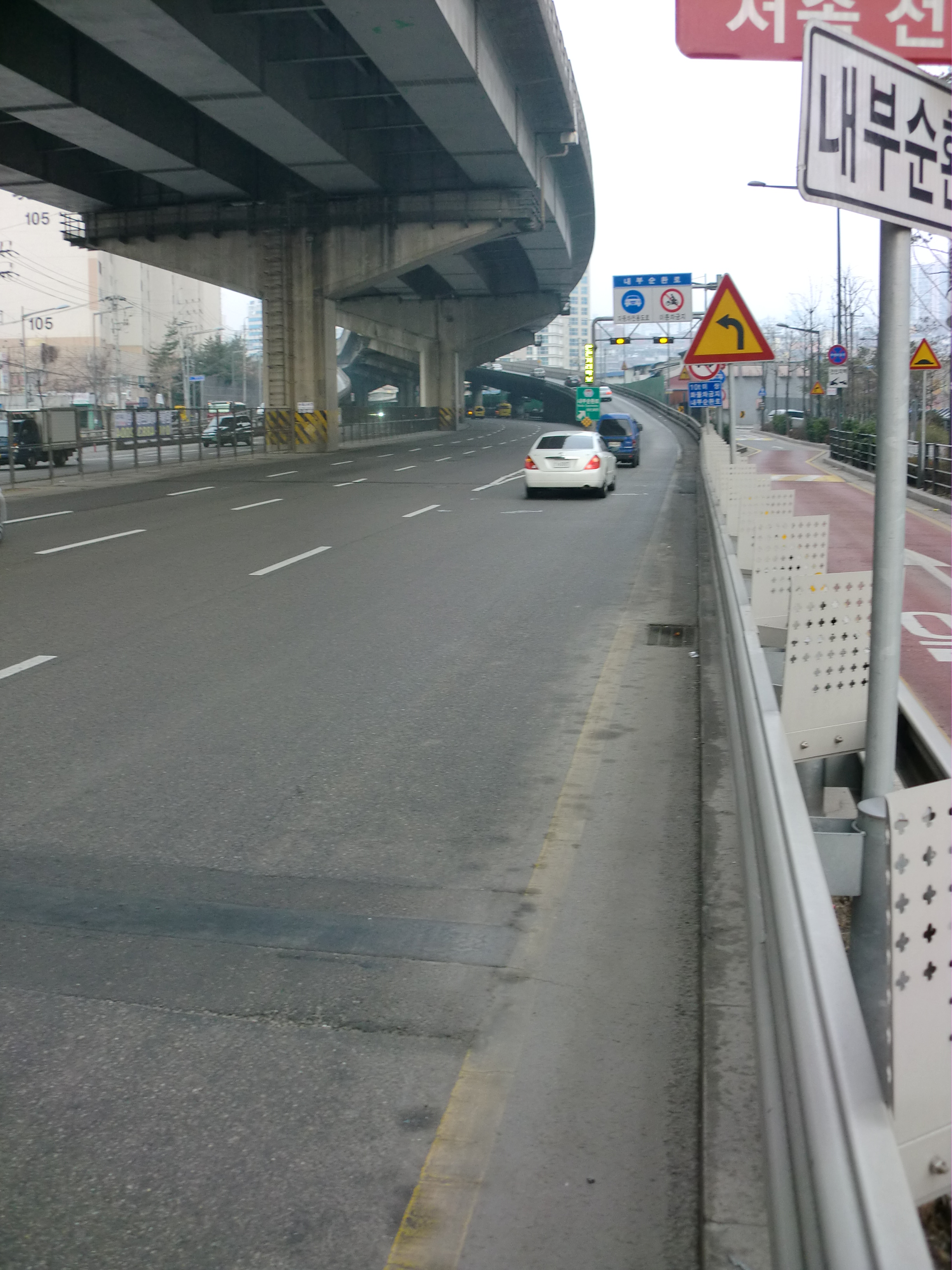
Naebu Expressway Gireum IC.

Seoul

- Mapo District - Seodaemun District - Jongno District - Seongbuk District - Dongdaemun District - Seongdong District

== List of Facilities ==
  - IC : 나들목(Interchange)
  - JC : 분기점(Junction)
  - TR : 터널(Tunnel)
- (■): Motorway section

Type	No.	Name	Korean name	Connection	Location		Note
JC		Seongsan Br.	성산대교북단	National Route 77; Prefectural Road 23; Seoul City Route 70 (Gangbyeonbuk-ro)	Seoul	Mapo District	Starting point
IC	1	Seongsan Ramp	성산램프	National Route 1 National Route 48; Seobu Urban Expressway (Seongsan-ro); World Cup Bridge	Seoul	Mapo District	
IC	2	Yeonhui Ramp	연희램프	Moraenae-ro; Hongjecheon-ro; Susaek-ro	Seoul	Seodaemun District	Seongsan-bound Only
IC	3	Hongje Ramp	홍제램프	Yeonhui-ro	Seoul	Seodaemun District	Seongdong-bound Only
IC	4	Hongeun Ramp	홍은램프	Segeomjeong-ro	Seoul	Seodaemun District	Seongsan-bound Only
TR		Hongjimun Tunnel	홍지문터널		Seoul	Seodaemun District	L= 1,890m
TR		Hongjimun Tunnel	홍지문터널		Seoul	Jongno District	L= 1,890m
TR		Jeongneung Tunnel	정릉터널		Seoul	Jongno District	L= 1,650m
TR		Jeongneung Tunnel	정릉터널		Seoul	Seongbuk District	L= 1,650m
IC	5	Kookmin University Entrance	국민대입구	Jeongneung-ro	Seoul	Seongbuk District	Seongsan-bound Only
IC	5	Jeongneung Ramp	정릉램프	Jeongneung-ro	Seoul	Seongbuk District	Seongdong-bound Only
IC	6	Gileum Ramp	길음램프	Jeongneung-ro; Jongam-ro	Seoul	Seongbuk District	Seongdong-bound Only
JC	7	Hawolgok	하월곡 분기점	Bukbu Expressway	Seoul	Seongbuk District	
IC	8	Wolgok Ramp	월곡램프	Wolgok-ro	Seoul	Seongbuk District	Seongsan-bound Only
IC	9	Majang Ramp	마장램프	Cheonggyecheon-ro	Seoul	Dongdaemun District	Seongdong-bound Only
-	-	~~Cheonggye Ramp~~	~~청계램프~~	~~Cheonggye Expressway~~	Seoul	Seongdong District	Demolished on 1 July 2003
IC	10	Sageun Ramp	사근램프	Salgoji-gil	Seoul	Seongdong District	Seongsan-bound Only
JC		Seongdong	성동 분기점	Seoul City Route 61 (Dongbu Expressway)	Seoul	Seongdong District	End point
