= Seoul City Route 41 =

Road in South Korea

Seoul Special Metropolitan City Route 41
- 서울특별시도 제41호선

Route information
- Length: 27.5 km (17.1 mi)

Major junctions
- From: Seocho District, Seoul
- To: Gangbuk District, Seoul

Location
- Country: South Korea

Highway system
- Highway systems of South Korea; Expressways; National; Local

Seoul Metropolitan City Route 41 (Korean: 서울특별시도 제41호선) is an urban road located in Seoul, South Korea. With a total length of 27.5 km (17.1 mi), this road starts from the Naegok Interchange in Seocho District, Seoul to Doseonsa Temple in Gangbuk District.

== Stopovers ==
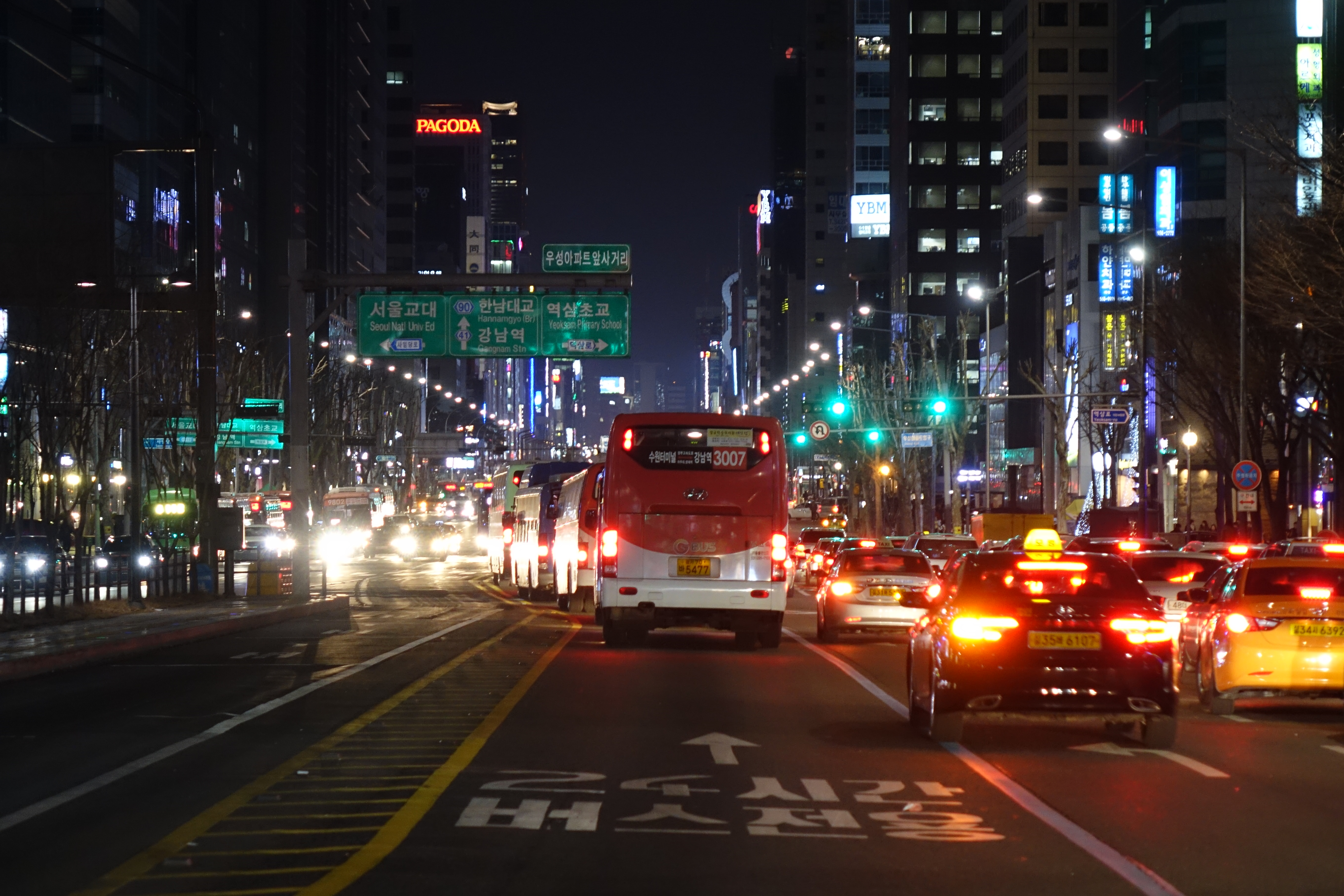
Woosung Apartment Intersection on Gangnam-daero.

Seoul

- Seocho District - Gangnam District - Yongsan District - Jung District - Jongno District - Seongbuk District - Gangbuk District - Dobong District - Gangbuk District

== List of Facilities ==
IS: Intersection, IC: Interchange

| Road name | Name | Hangul name | Connection | Location | | Note |
Connected with Heolleung-ro
| Heolleung-ro | Naegok IC | 내곡 나들목 | Seoul City Route 51 (Eonju-ro); Bundang-Naegok Urban Expressway | Seoul | Seocho District | |
| Heolleung-ro | Seoul Child Hospital | 서울시 어린이병원 | | Seoul | Seocho District | |
| Heolleung-ro | Yeomgok IC | 염곡 나들목 | Yangjae-daero 12-gil (Sinwon Underpass) | Seoul | Seocho District | |
| Heolleung-ro | Cheonggyesan Entrance IS | 청계산입구 교차로 | Cheonggyesan-ro | Seoul | Seocho District | |
| Heolleung-ro | Yeomgok IS | 염곡사거리 | National Route 47 (Yangjae-daero) | Seoul | Seocho District | Yeomgok Underpass section |
| Gangnam-daero | Yeomgok IS | | National Route 47 (Yangjae-daero) | Seoul | Seocho District | Yeomgok Underpass section |
| Gangnam-daero | aT Center IS | aT센터 교차로 | Dongsan-ro | Seoul | Seocho District | |
| Gangnam-daero | Citizen's Forest IS (Yangjae Citizen's Forest station) | 시민의숲 교차로 (양재시민의숲역) | Maeheon-ro | Seoul | Seocho District | |
| Gangnam-daero | Yeongdong 1 Bridge IS | 영동1교 교차로 | Mabang-ro | Seoul | Seocho District | |
| Gangnam-daero | Yeongdong 1 Bridge | 영동1교 | | Seoul | Seocho District | |
| Gangnam-daero | No name | (이름 없음) | Yangjaecheon-ro | Seoul | Seocho District | |
| Gangnam-daero | Korean Educational Development Institute IS | 교육개발원입구 교차로 | Baumoe-ro | Seoul | Seocho District | |
| Gangnam-daero | Yangjae station IS | 양재역 교차로 | Seoul City Route 92 (Nambu Beltway) | Seoul | West: Seocho District; East: Gangnam District | |
| Gangnam-daero | Baengbaeng IS | 뱅뱅사거리 | Hyoryeong-ro; Dogok-ro | Seoul | West: Seocho District; East: Gangnam District | |
| Gangnam-daero | Woosung Apartment IS | 우성아파트앞 사거리 | Saimdang-ro; Yeoksam-ro | Seoul | West: Seocho District; East: Gangnam District | |
| Gangnam-daero | Gangnam station IS | 강남역 교차로 | Seoul City Route 90 (Seocho-daero, Teheran-ro) | Seoul | West: Seocho District; East: Gangnam District | |
| Gangnam-daero | Kyobo Tower IS (Sinnonhyeon station) | 교보타워사거리 (신논현역) | Sapyeong-daero; Bongeunsa-ro | Seoul | West: Seocho District; East: Gangnam District | Former Jeilsaengmyeong IS (First Life IS) |
| Gangnam-daero | Nonhyeon station IS | 논현역 교차로 | Sinbanpo-ro; Hakdong-ro | Seoul | West: Seocho District; East: Gangnam District | Former Yeongdong IS |
| Gangnam-daero | Sinsa station IS | 신사역 교차로 | Naruteo-ro; Dosan-daero | Seoul | West: Seocho District; East: Gangnam District | |
| Gangnam-daero | Hannam Br. IC (South) | 한남대교남단 나들목 | Gyeongbu Urban Expressway; Jamwon-ro; Apgujeong-ro; Olympic-daero (Seoul City Route 88) | Seoul | West: Seocho District; East: Gangnam District | |
| Gangnam-daero | Hannam Bridge | 한남대교 | | Seoul | Gangnam District | |
| Hannam-daero | Hannam Br. IC (North) | 한남대교북단 나들목 | National Route 46 (Gangbyeonbuk-ro); Local Route 23 (Gangbyeonbuk-ro) (Seoul City Route 70) | Seoul | Yongsan District | |
| Hannam-daero | Hannam IS | 한남오거리 | Dokseodang-ro; Daesagwan-ro | Seoul | Yongsan District | Hanam 2 Overpas section |
| Hannam-daero | (Hannam 1 Overpass Entrance) | (한남1고가차도 입구) | Samil-daero | Seoul | Yongsan District | |
| Hannam-daero | Bukhannam IS | 북한남삼거리 | Itaewon-ro | Seoul | Yongsan District | |
| Hannam-daero | No name | (이름 없음) | Sowol-ro | Seoul | Yongsan District | |
| Hannam-daero | (Beotigogae IS) | (버티고개삼거리) | Dasan-ro | Seoul | Yongsan District | |
| Jangchungdan-ro | (Beotigogae IS) | | Dasan-ro | Seoul | Yongsan District | |
| Jangchungdan-ro | National Theater of Korea IS | 국립극장 교차로 | Namsangongwon-gil | Seoul | Jung District | |
| Jangchungdan-ro | Namsan 2nd Tunnel Entrance IS | 남산2호터널입구 교차로 | Noksapyeong-daero 58-gil (Namsan 2nd Tunnel) | Seoul | Jung District | |
| Jangchungdan-ro | Dongguk University IS | 동국대학교앞 교차로 | | Seoul | Jung District | |
| Jangchungdan-ro | Jangchung Arena (Dongguk University station) | 장충체육관 교차로 (동대입구역) | Dongho-ro; Jangchungdan-ro | Seoul | Jung District | |
| Dongho-ro | Jangchung Arena (Dongguk University station) | | Dongho-ro; Jangchungdan-ro | Seoul | Jung District | |
| Dongho-ro | Toegye-ro 5-ga IS | 퇴계로5가 교차로 | Toegye-ro | Seoul | Jung District | |
| Dongho-ro | Ojang-dong IS | 오장동사거리 | Mareunnae-ro | Seoul | Jung District | |
| Dongho-ro | Eulji-ro 5-ga IS | 을지로5가 교차로 | Seoul City Route 60 (Eulji-ro) | Seoul | Jung District | |
| Dongho-ro | Cheonggye 5-ga IS | 청계5가 교차로 | Cheonggyecheon-ro | Seoul | Jung District | |
| Dongho-ro | Cheonggye 5-ga IS | | Cheonggyecheon-ro | Seoul | Jongno District | |
| Dongho-ro | Jongno 5-ga IS (Jongno 5-ga station) | 종로5가 교차로 (종로5가역) | National Route 6 (Jongno) | Seoul | Jongno District | |
| Daehang-ro | Jongno 5-ga IS (Jongno 5-ga station) | | National Route 6 (Jongno) | Seoul | Jongno District | |
| Daehang-ro | No name | (이름 없음) | Kimsangok-ro | Seoul | Jongno District | |
| Daehang-ro | Ihwa IS | 이화사거리 | Seoul City Route 50 (Yulgok-ro) | Seoul | Jongno District | |
| Daehang-ro | Hyehwa station | 혜화역 | | Seoul | Jongno District | |
| Daehang-ro | Hyehwa-dong Rotary | 혜화동로터리 | Changgyeonggung-ro; Hyehwa-ro | Seoul | Jongno District | |
| Changgyeonggung-ro | Hyehwa-dong Rotary | | Changgyeonggung-ro; Hyehwa-ro | Seoul | Jongno District | |
| Changgyeonggung-ro | Hansung University station (Samseon Bridge) | 한성대입구역 교차로 (삼선교) | Seongbuk-ro; Samseongyo-ro | Seoul | Seongbuk District | |
| Dongsomun-ro | Hansung University station (Samseon Bridge) | | Seongbuk-ro; Samseongyo-ro | Seoul | Seongbuk District | |
| Dongsomun-ro | Seongbuk District Office Entrance IS | 성북구청입구 교차로 | Bomun-ro | Seoul | Seongbuk District | |
| Dongsomun-ro | Sungshin Women's University station IS | 성신여대입구역 교차로 | Arirang-ro; Dongsomun-ro 20-gil | Seoul | Seongbuk District | |
| Dongsomun-ro | Miarigogae | 미아리고개 | Bugaksan-ro | Seoul | Seongbuk District | |
| Dongsomun-ro | Gireum Bridge IS | 길음교 교차로 | Seoul City Route 20 (Jeongneung-ro) | Seoul | Seongbuk District | |
| Dongsomun-ro | Gireum station IS | 길음역 교차로 | Dongsomun-ro | Seoul | Seongbuk District | |
| Samyang-ro | Gireum station IS | | Dongsomun-ro | Seoul | Seongbuk District | |
| Samyang-ro | Seoul Mia Elementary School | 서울미아초등학교 | Sungin-ro; Samyang-ro 13-gil | Seoul | Seongbuk District | |
| Samyang-ro | Samyang-dong IS | 삼양동사거리 | Solsaem-ro | Seoul | Gangbuk District | |
| Samyang-ro | Samyang Market IS | 삼양시장 교차로 | Solmae-ro | Seoul | Gangbuk District | |
| Samyang-ro | No name | (이름 없음) | Suyu-ro; Samyang-ro 77-gil | Seoul | Gangbuk District | |
| Samyang-ro | Hwagyesa Entrance IS | 화계사입구 교차로 | Deongneung-ro | Seoul | Gangbuk District | |
| Samyang-ro | Wooi Elementary School IS | 우이초등교앞 교차로 | Samgaksan-ro | Seoul | Gangbuk District | |
| Samyang-ro | April 19 National Cemetery Entrance IS | 국립4.19민주묘지입구사거리 | 4.19-ro Hancheon-ro | Seoul | Gangbuk District | |
| Samyang-ro | Duksung Women's University Dobong Library | 덕성여자대학교 도봉도서관 | | Seoul | West: Gangbuk District; East: Dobong District | |
| Samyang-ro | Cheonghan Villa IS | 청한빌라앞 교차로 | Haedeung-ro | Seoul | West: Gangbuk District; East: Dobong District | |
| Samyang-ro | (Doseonsa Entrance ) | (도선사 입구) | Banghak-ro; Samyang-ro 177-gil Samyang-ro 179-gil | Seoul | Gangbuk District | |
Connected with Samyang-ro 181-gil
