= Seoul City Route 50 =

Road in South Korea

Seoul Special Metropolitan City Route 50
- 서울특별시도 제50호선

Route information
- Length: 30.4 km (18.9 mi)

Major junctions
- From: Eunpyeong District, Seoul
- To: Gangdong District, Seoul

Location
- Country: South Korea

Highway system
- Highway systems of South Korea; Expressways; National; Local

Seoul Metropolitan City Route 50 (Korean: 서울특별시도 제50호선) is an urban road located in Seoul, South Korea. With a total length of 30.4 km (18.9 mi), this road starts from the Susaek-dong in Eunpyeong District, Seoul to Sangil IC in Gangdong District.

== Stopovers ==
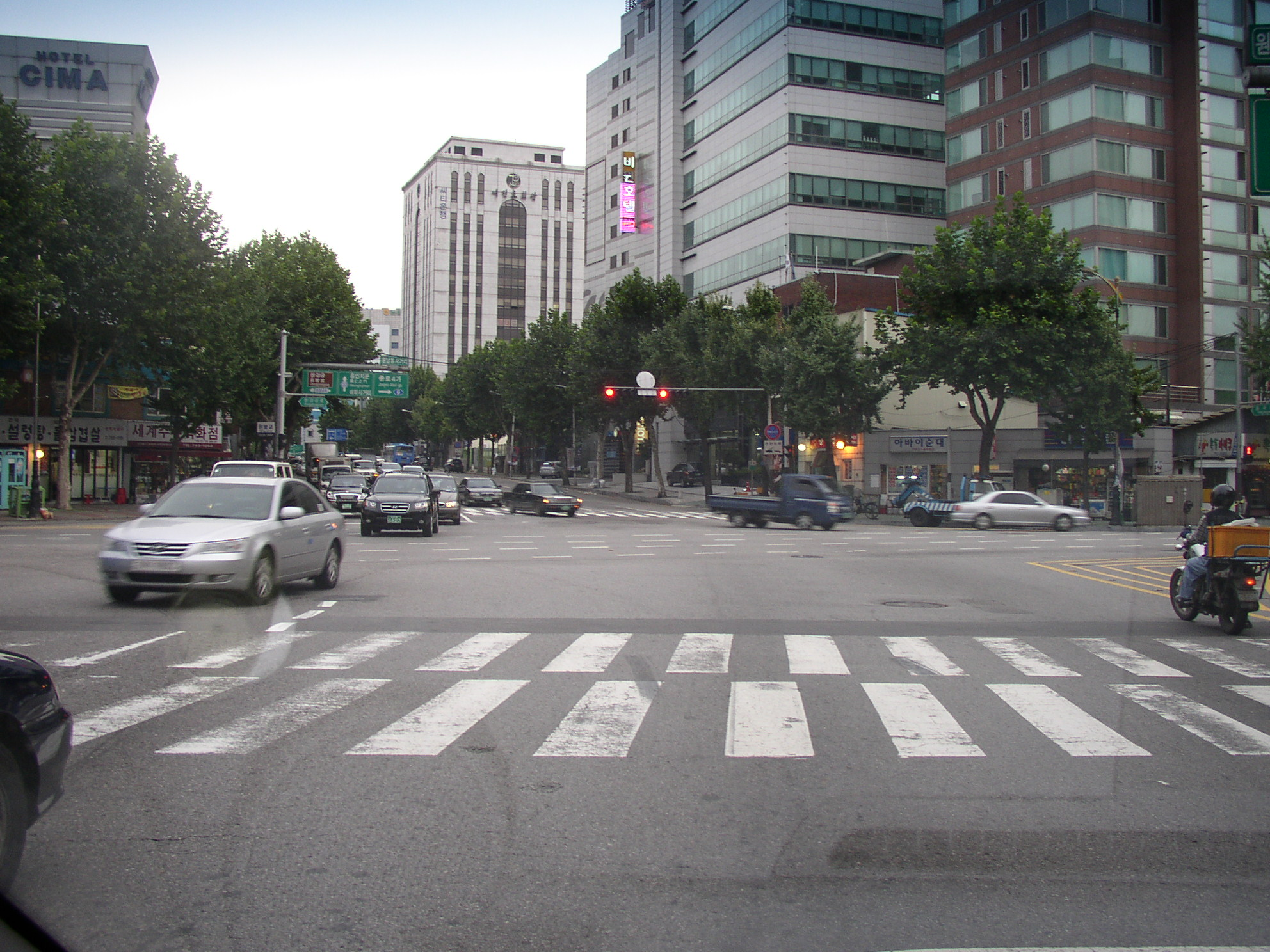
Wonnam-dong IS

Seoul

- Eunpyeong District - Seodaemun District - Mapo District - Seodaemun - Jongno District - Dongdaemun District - Gwangjin District - Gangdong District

Gyeonggi Province

- Hanam

Seoul

- Gangdong District

== List of Facilities ==
IS: Intersection, IC: Interchange

| Road name | Name | Hangul name | Connection | Location | | Note |
Directly connected with Jungang-ro
| Susaek-ro | Deokun Bridge | 덕은교 | | Seoul | Eunpyeong District | |
| Susaek-ro | Deokun Bridge IS (Eunpyeong Public Garage) | 덕은교 교차로 (은평공영차고지) | Susaek-ro 24-gil | Seoul | Eunpyeong District | |
| Susaek-ro | Susaek Bridge IS | 수색교 교차로 | Gayang-daero | Seoul | Eunpyeong District | |
| Susaek-ro | Susaek station IS | 수색역 교차로 | Eunpyeongteoneol-ro | Seoul | Eunpyeong District | |
| Susaek-ro | (Unnamed) | (명칭 미상) | Jeungsanseo-gil | Seoul | Eunpyeong District | |
| Susaek-ro | Jeungsan Bridge IS (Jeungsan Bridge) (Digital Media City station) | 증산교 교차로 (증산교) (디지털미디어시티역) | National Route 1 (Jeungsan-ro); Bulgwangcheon-gil | Seoul | Eunpyeong District | |
| Susaek-ro | Jeungsan Bridge IS (Jeungsan Bridge) (Digital Media City station) | | National Route 1 (Jeungsan-ro); Bulgwangcheon-gil | Seoul | Seodaemun District | |
| Susaek-ro | Bukgajwa IS | 북가좌삼거리 | Eungam-ro | Seoul | Seodaemun District | |
| Susaek-ro | Gajwa IS | 가좌삼거리 | Susaek-ro 6-gil | Seoul | Seodaemun District | |
| Susaek-ro | (Gajwa station) | (가좌역) | | Seoul | Seodaemun District | |
| Susaek-ro | Sacheon Bridge IS (Sacheon Bridge) | 사천교 교차로 (사천교) | Moraenae-ro | Seoul | Seodaemun District | National Route 48 overlap |
| Seongsan-ro | Sacheon Bridge IS (Sacheon Bridge) | | National Route 48 (Seongsan-ro); Hongjecheon-ro | Seoul | Mapo District | National Route 48 overlap |
| Seongsan-ro | Yeonhui IC | 연희 나들목 | Yeonhui-ro | Seoul | Seodaemun District | National Route 48 overlap |
| Seongsan-ro | Yonsei University IS | 연세대 교차로 | Yonsei-ro | Seoul | Seodaemun District | National Route 48 overlap |
| Seongsan-ro | (Sinchon station) | (신촌역) | Sinchonnyeok-ro | Seoul | Seodaemun District | National Route 48 overlap |
| Seongsan-ro | Bongwon Overpass | 봉원고가차도 | Bongwonsa-gil | Seoul | Seodaemun District | National Route 48 overlap |
| Seongsan-ro | Geumhwa Tunnel | 금화터널 | | Seoul | Seodaemun District | National Route 48 overlap |
| Seongsan-ro | Dongnimmun station (Dongnimmun Overpass) (Dongnimmun) | 독립문역 교차로 (독립문고가차도) (독립문) | Seoul City Route 21 (Tongil-ro) | Seoul | Jongno District | National Route 48 overlap |
| Sajik-ro | Dongnimmun station (Dongnimmun Overpass) (Dongnimmun) | | Seoul City Route 21 (Tongil-ro) | Seoul | Jongno District | National Route 48 overlap |
| Sajik-ro | Sajik Tunnel | 사직터널 | | Seoul | Jongno District | National Route 48 overlap |
| Sajik-ro | Sajik Park IS | 사직공원 교차로 | Pirundae-ro; Sajik-ro 8-gil | Seoul | Jongno District | National Route 48 overlap |
| Sajik-ro | Gyeongbokgung station IS | 경복궁역 교차로 | Jahamun-ro; Saemunan-ro 3-gil | Seoul | Jongno District | National Route 48 overlap |
| Sajik-ro | Central Government Complex IS | 정부서울청사 교차로 | Hyoja-ro | Seoul | Jongno District | National Route 48 overlap |
| Sajik-ro | Gwanghwamun IS | 광화문 교차로 | National Route 48 (Sejong-daero); Seoul City Route 31 (Sejong-daero) | Seoul | Jongno District | National Route 48 overlap |
| Sajik-ro | Gyeongbokgung IS | 경복궁 교차로 | Samcheong-ro; Jong-ro 1-gil | Seoul | Jongno District | National Route 48 overlap |
| Yulgok-ro | Gyeongbokgung IS | | Samcheong-ro; Jong-ro 1-gil | Seoul | Jongno District | National Route 48 overlap |
| Yulgok-ro | Anguk-dong IS | 안국동사거리 | Ujeongguk-ro; Insadong-gil; Yulgok-ro 3-gil | Seoul | Jongno District | |
| Yulgok-ro | Anguk station IS | 안국역 교차로 | Samil-daero; Bukchon-ro | Seoul | Jongno District | |
| Yulgok-ro | Changdeokgung IS (Donhwamun) | 창덕궁 교차로 (돈화문) | Donhwamun-ro | Seoul | Jongno District | |
| Yulgok-ro | Wonnam-dong IS | 원남동사거리 | Changgyeonggung-ro | Seoul | Jongno District | |
| Yulgok-ro | Ihwa IS | 이화사거리 | Seoul City Route 41 (Daehangno) | Seoul | Jongno District | |
| Yulgok-ro | (Unnamed) | (명칭 미상) | Kimsangok-ro | Seoul | Jongno District | |
| Yulgok-ro | Honginjimun IS (Dongdaemun station) | 흥인지문 교차로 (동대문역) | National Route 6 (Jongno) | Seoul | Jongno District | |
| Yulgok-ro | Cheonggye 6-ga IS (Ogansu Bridge) | 청계6가 교차로 (오간수교) | Jangchungdan-ro; Cheonggyecheon-ro | Seoul | North:Jongno District; South:Jung District | |
| Cheonggyecheon-ro | Cheonggye 6-ga IS (Ogansu Bridge) | | Jangchungdan-ro; Cheonggyecheon-ro | Seoul | North:Jongno District; South:Jung District | |
| Cheonggyecheon-ro | (Malgeunnaedari) | (맑은내다리) | | Seoul | North:Jongno District; South:Jung District | |
| Cheonggyecheon-ro | Cheonggye 7-ga IS (Dasi Bridge) | 청계7가 교차로 (다산교) | Jibong-ro; Dasan-ro | Seoul | North:Jongno District; South:Jung District | |
| Cheonggyecheon-ro | (Yeongdo Bridge) | (영도교) | Jong-ro 58-gil Majang-ro 9-gil | Seoul | North:Jongno District; South:Jung District | |
| Cheonggyecheon-ro | Cheonggye 8-ga IS (Hwanghak Bridge) | 청계8가 교차로 (황학교) | Nangye-ro | Seoul | North:Jongno District; South:Jung District | |
| Cheonggyecheon-ro | Cheonggye 8-ga IS (Hwanghak Bridge) | | Nangye-ro | Seoul | North:Dongdaemun District; South:Seongdong District | |
| Cheonggyecheon-ro | (Biudang Bridge) | (비우당교) | Hajeong-ro; Majang-ro 19-gil | Seoul | North:Dongdaemun District; South:Seongdong District | |
| Cheonggyecheon-ro | Seongbukcheon Bridge | 성북천교 | | Seoul | North:Dongdaemun District; South:Seongdong District | |
| Cheonggyecheon-ro | Cheonggye 9-ga IS (Muhak Bridge) | 청계9가 교차로 (무학교) | Muhak-ro | Seoul | North:Dongdaemun District; South:Seongdong District | |
| Cheonggyecheon-ro | (Dumuldari) | (두물다리) | | Seoul | North:Dongdaemun District; South:Seongdong District | |
| Cheonggyecheon-ro | Majang Ramp (Jeongneungcheon Bridge) | 마장램프 (정릉천교) | Naebu Expressway (Seoul City Route 30); Jeongneungcheondong-ro | Seoul | North:Dongdaemun District; South:Seongdong District | |
| Cheonggyecheon-ro | Seoul Facilities Management Corporation IS | 서울시설공단 교차로 | Seoul City Route 51 (Gosanja-ro) | Seoul | North:Dongdaemun District; South:Seongdong District | |
| Cheonggyecheon-ro | Cheonggye Hanshin Hue Plus IS | 청계한신휴플러스 교차로 | Cheonho-daero; Seoulsiripdae-ro | Seoul | North:Dongdaemun District; South:Seongdong District | |
| Cheonho-daero | Cheonggye Hanshin Hue Plus IS | | Cheonho-daero; Seoulsiripdae-ro | Seoul | North:Dongdaemun District; South:Seongdong District | |
| Cheonho-daero | Sindap station IS (Sindap Underpass) | 신답역 교차로 (신답지하차도) | Majang-ro; Sagajeong-ro | Seoul | North:Dongdaemun District; South:Seongdong District | |
| Cheonho-daero | Dapsimni station | 답십리역 | | Seoul | North:Dongdaemun District; South:Seongdong District | |
| Cheonho-daero | Dapsimni station IS | 답십리역 교차로 | Jeonnong-ro; Yongdapjungang 15-gil | Seoul | North:Dongdaemun District; South:Seongdong District | |
| Cheonho-daero | Seoul Metropolitan Rapid Transit Corporation IS | 도시철도공사 교차로 | Hancheon-ro; Jadongchasijang-gil | Seoul | North:Dongdaemun District; South:Seongdong District | |
| Cheonho-daero | Janghanpyeong station IS | 장한평역 교차로 | Janghan-ro | Seoul | North:Dongdaemun District; South:Seongdong District | |
| Cheonho-daero | Gunja Bridge | 군자교 | Dongbu Expressway (Seoul City Route 61); Garam-gil | Seoul | North:Dongdaemun District; South:Seongdong District | |
| Cheonho-daero | Gunja Bridge | | Dongbu Expressway (Seoul City Route 61); Garam-gil | Seoul | North:Gwangjin District; South:Seongdong District | |
| Cheonho-daero | Gunja Bridge IS | 군자교 교차로 | National Route 3 (Dongil-ro); National Route 47 (Dongil-ro) | Seoul | North:Gwangjin District; South:Seongdong District | National Route 3 overlap |
| Cheonho-daero | Gunja Bridge IS | | National Route 3 (Dongil-ro); National Route 47 (Dongil-ro) | Seoul | Gwangjin District | National Route 3 overlap |
| Cheonho-daero | Gunja station IS | 군자역 교차로 | Neungdong-ro | Seoul | Gwangjin District | National Route 3 overlap |
| Cheonho-daero | Achasan Station IS | 아차산역삼거리 | Seoul City Route 71 (Yongmasan-ro) | Seoul | Gwangjin District | National Route 3 and Seoul City Route 71 overlap |
| Cheonho-daero | Achasan station | 아차산역 | | Seoul | Gwangjin District | National Route 3 and Seoul City Route 71 overlap |
| Cheonho-daero | Achasan Station IS | 아차산역사거리 | National Route 3 (Jayang-ro); Seoul City Route 71 (Jayang-ro) | Seoul | Gwangjin District | National Route 3 and Seoul City Route 71 overlap |
| Cheonho-daero | Walkerhill Entrance IS | 워커힐입구 교차로 | Walkerhill-ro | Seoul | Gwangjin District | |
| Cheonho-daero | Gwangjang IS (Gwangnaru station) | 광장사거리 (광나루역) | National Route 43 (Achasan-ro); National Route 46 (Achasan-ro) | Seoul | Gwangjin District | National Route 43, National Route 46 overlap |
| Cheonho-daero | Cheonho Br. IC | 천호대교북단 나들목 | Gangbyeonbuk-ro (Seoul City Route 70); National Route 46 (Gangbyeonbuk-ro) | Seoul | Gwangjin District | National Route 43, National Route 46 overlap |
| Cheonho-daero | Cheonho Bridge | 천호대교 | | Seoul | Gwangjin District | National Route 43 overlap |
| Cheonho-daero | Cheonho Bridge | 천호대교 | | Seoul | Gangdong District | National Route 43 overlap |
| Cheonho-daero | Cheonho Br. IC | 천호대교남단 나들목 | Olympic-daero (Seoul City Route 88) | Seoul | Gangdong District | National Route 43 overlap |
| Cheonho-daero | Cheonho IS (Cheonho Underpass) (Cheonho station) | 천호사거리 (천호지하차도) (천호역) | Seoul City Route 90 (Olympic-ro) | Seoul | Gangdong District | National Route 43 overlap |
| Cheonho-daero | Gangdong station | 강동역 | | Seoul | Gangdong District | National Route 43 overlap |
| Cheonho-daero | Kangdong Sacred Heart Hospital IS | 강동성심병원 교차로 | Seongan-ro | Seoul | Gangdong District | National Route 43 overlap |
| Cheonho-daero | Gildong IS | 길동사거리 | Seoul City Route 92 (Yangjae-daero) | Seoul | Gangdong District | National Route 43 overlap |
| Cheonho-daero | Doonchon High School Entrance IS | 둔촌고교입구 교차로 | Myeongil-ro | Seoul | Gangdong District | National Route 43 overlap |
| Cheonho-daero | Ecological Park IS | 생태공원앞 교차로 | Dongnam-ro | Seoul | Gangdong District | National Route 43 overlap |
| Cheonho-daero | (Unnamed) | (명칭 미상) | Cheonho-daero 213-gil | Gyeonggi Province | Hanam | National Route 43 overlap |
| Cheonho-daero | (Unnamed) | (명칭 미상) | Sangam-ro | Seoul | Gangdong District | National Route 43 overlap |
| Cheonho-daero | Sangil 2 Bridge | 상일2교 | Sangil-ro | Seoul | Gangdong District | National Route 43 overlap |
| Cheonho-daero | Sangil IC | 상일 나들목 | Seoul Ring Expressway | Seoul | Gangdong District | National Route 43 overlap |
Directly connected with "National Route 43 (Jojeong-daero)
