= Seoul City Route 90 =

Road in South Korea

Seoul Special Metropolitan City Route 90
- 서울특별시도 제90호선

Route information
- Length: 28.3 km (17.6 mi)

Major junctions
- From: Yangcheon District, Seoul
- To: Gangdong District, Seoul

Location
- Country: South Korea

Highway system
- Highway systems of South Korea; Expressways; National; Local

Seoul Metropolitan City Route 90 (Korean: 서울특별시도 제90호선) is an urban road located in Seoul, South Korea. With a total length of 28.3 km (17.6 mi), this road starts from the Sinjeong-dong in Yangcheon District, Seoul to Amsa-dong in Gangdong District.

== Stopovers ==
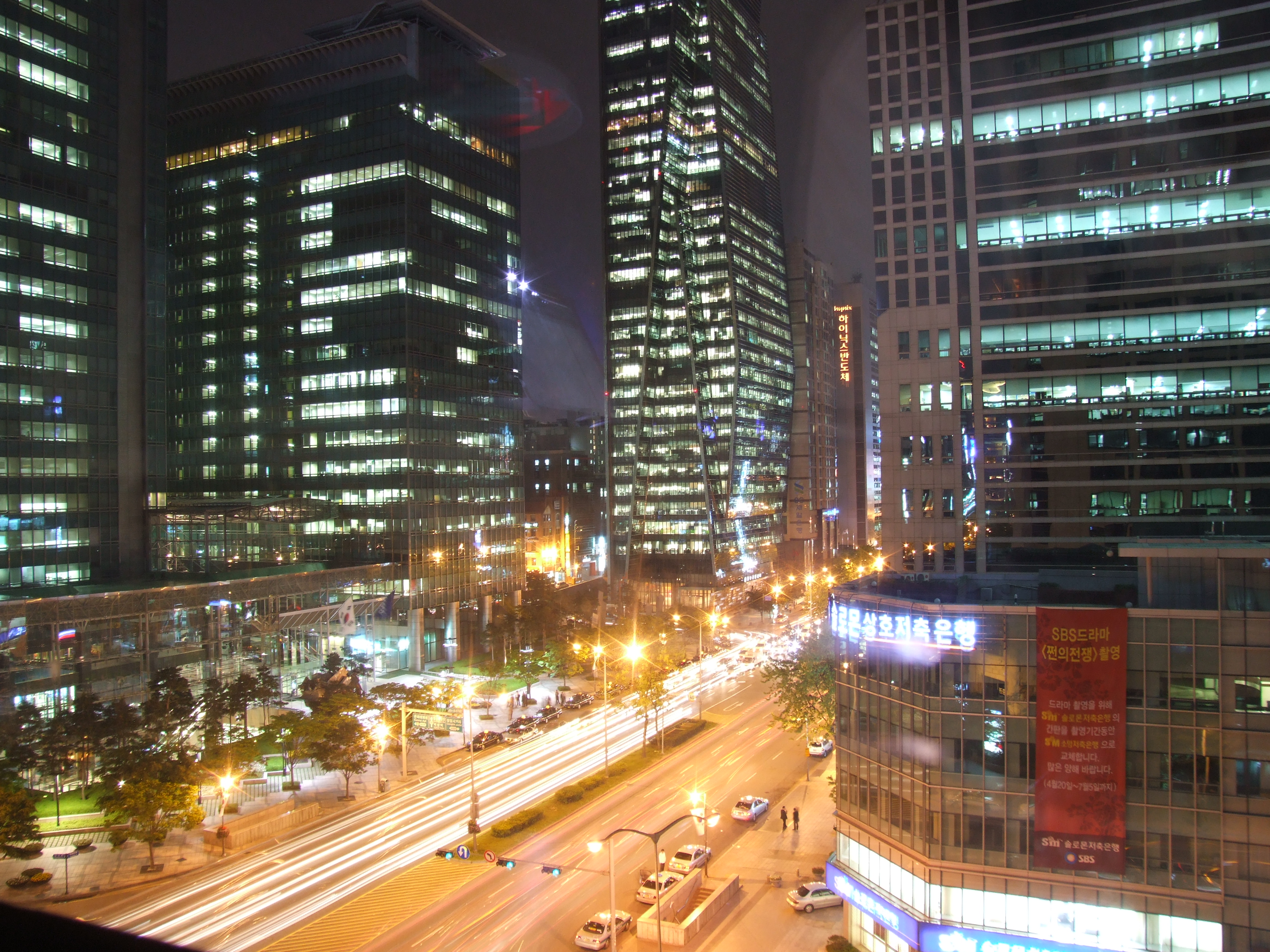
POSCO IS

Seoul

- Yangcheon District - Yeongdeungpo District - Dongjak District - Seocho District - Gangnam District - Songpa District - Gangdong District

== List of Facilities ==
IS: Intersection, IC: Interchange

Road name	Name	Hangul name	Connection	Location		Note
Connected with Sinmok-ro
Dorimcheon-ro	Sinjeong Bridge IS (West)	신정교 교차로 (서단)	Anyangcheon-ro	Seoul	Yangcheon District	
Dorimcheon-ro	Sinjeong Bridge	신정교		Seoul	Guro District	
Dorimcheon-ro	Sinjeong Bridge IS (East)	신정교 교차로 (동단)	National Route 1 (Seobu Expressway)	Seoul	Yeongdeungpo District	Sindorim Overpass section (Dorimcheon Overpass)
Dorimcheon-ro	No name	(이름 없음)	Gyeongin-ro 71-gil National Route 46 (Gyeongin-ro); Seoul City Route 60 (Gyeongin-ro)	Seoul	Yeongdeungpo District	Sindorim Overpass section (Dorimcheon Overpass)
Dorimcheon-ro	(Sindorim Ramp)	(신도림고가램프)	Dorimcheon-ro	Seoul	Yeongdeungpo District	Sindorim Overpass section (Dorimcheon Overpass)
Daebangcheon-ro	(Sindorim Ramp)		Dorimcheon-ro	Seoul	Yeongdeungpo District	Sindorim Overpass section (Dorimcheon Overpass)
Daebangcheon-ro	(Sindorim Overpass Entrance)	(신도림고가입구)	Doyeong-ro	Seoul	Yeongdeungpo District	Sindorim Overpass section (Dorimcheon Overpass)
Daebangcheon-ro	Sindorim Overpass IS	신도림고가차도앞 교차로	Dosin-ro	Seoul	Yeongdeungpo District	
Daebangcheon-ro	Sungrak Building IS	성락빌딩앞 교차로	Gamasan-ro	Seoul	Yeongdeungpo District	
Daebangcheon-ro	Singil Square Park IS	신길광장공원 교차로	Daebangcheon-ro; Dorim-ro	Seoul	Yeongdeungpo District	
Dorim-ro	Singil Square Park IS		Daebangcheon-ro; Dorim-ro	Seoul	Yeongdeungpo District	
Dorim-ro	Daeyoung Elementary School IS	대영초교 교차로	Dorim-ro	Seoul	Yeongdeungpo District	
Sinpung-ro	Daeyoung Elementary School IS		Dorim-ro	Seoul	Yeongdeungpo District	
Sinpung-ro	Sinpung station IS	신풍역 교차로	Singil-ro	Seoul	Yeongdeungpo District	
Sinpung-ro	Boramae station IS	보라매역 교차로	Seoul City Route 21 (Yeouidaebang-ro)	Seoul	Yeongdeungpo District	
Sangdo-ro	Boramae station IS		Seoul City Route 21 (Yeouidaebang-ro)	Seoul	Dongjak District	
Sangdo-ro	Sindaebangsamgeori station IS	신대방삼거리역 교차로	Boramae-ro	Seoul	Dongjak District	
Sangdo-ro	No name	(이름 없음)	Seongdae-ro	Seoul	Dongjak District	
Sangdo-ro	Jangseungbaegi IS (Jangseungbaegi station)	장승배기 교차로 (장승배기역)	Jangseungbaegi-ro	Seoul	Dongjak District	
Sangdo-ro	No name	(이름 없음)	Manyang-ro; Sangdo-ro 34-gil	Seoul	Dongjak District	
Sangdo-ro	Sangdo station IS	상도역 교차로	Yangnyeong-ro	Seoul	Dongjak District	
Sangdo-ro	Soongsil University station IS	숭실대입구역 교차로	Sangdo-ro	Seoul	Dongjak District	
Sadang-ro	Soongsil University station IS		Sangdo-ro	Seoul	Dongjak District	
Sadang-ro	Soongsil University	숭실대학교		Seoul	Dongjak District	
Sadang-ro	No name	(이름 없음)	Seodal-ro; Gwanak-ro 40-gil Sadang-ro 2-gil	Seoul	Dongjak District	
Sadang-ro	Chongshin University Sadang Campus	총신대학교 사당캠퍼스		Seoul	Dongjak District	
Sadang-ro	Namseong station IS	남성역 교차로	Solbat-ro	Seoul	Dongjak District	
Sadang-ro	Namsung Elementary School IS	남성초등학교 교차로	Sadang-ro 23-gil	Seoul	Dongjak District	
Sadang-ro	Isu station IS	이수역 교차로	Dongjak-daero	Seoul	Dongjak District	
Seocho-daero	Isu station IS		Dongjak-daero	Seoul	Seocho District	
Seocho-daero	(Sabang Bridge)	(사방교)	Bangbaecheon-ro	Seoul	Seocho District	
Seocho-daero	Bangbae Elementary School Entrance IS	방배초교입구 교차로	Dogu-ro	Seoul	Seocho District	
Seocho-daero	No name	(이름 없음)	Bangbaejungang-ro	Seoul	Seocho District	
Seocho-daero	Naebang station IS	내방역 교차로	Bangbae-ro	Seoul	Seocho District	
Seocho-daero	Seoripul Tunnel	서리풀터널		Seoul	Seocho District	
Seocho-daero	No name	(이름 없음)	Donggwang-ro; Myeongdal-ro	Seoul	Seocho District	
Seocho-daero	Supreme Court	대법원		Seoul	Seocho District	
Seocho-daero	Seocho station IS	서초역 교차로	Seoul City Route 31 (Banpo-daero)	Seoul	Seocho District	
Seocho-daero	(Unnamed IS) Seoul Central District Prosecutor's Office Seoul High Court Seoul Central District Court	(교차로 이름 없음) 서울중앙지방검찰청 서울고등법원 서울중앙지방법원	Beopwon-ro	Seoul	Seocho District	
Seocho-daero	Supreme Court.Supreme Prosecutors' Office (National University of Education Station)	법원.검찰청 교차로 (교대역)	Seochojungang-ro	Seoul	Seocho District	
Seocho-daero	Jinheung Apartment IS	진흥아파트 교차로	Seoun-ro	Seoul	Seocho District	
Seocho-daero	Gangnam station IS	강남역 교차로	Seoul City Route 41 (Gangnam-daero)	Seoul	Seocho District	
Teheran-ro	Gangnam station IS		Seoul City Route 41 (Gangnam-daero)	Seoul	Gangnam District	
Teheran-ro	Kukkiwon Entrance IS	국기원입구 교차로	Teheran-ro 7-gil Teheran-ro 8-gil	Seoul	Gangnam District	
Teheran-ro	Yeoksam station IS	역삼역 교차로	Nonhyeon-ro	Seoul	Gangnam District	
Teheran-ro	Renaissance Hotel IS	르네상스호텔 교차로	Seoul City Route 51 (Eonju-ro)	Seoul	Gangnam District	
Teheran-ro	Seolleung station IS	선릉역 교차로	Seolleung-ro	Seoul	Gangnam District	
Teheran-ro	Seonjeongneung	선정릉		Seoul	Gangnam District	
Teheran-ro	POSCO IS	포스코사거리	Samseong-ro	Seoul	Gangnam District	
Teheran-ro	Samseong station IS (COEX)	삼성역 교차로 (코엑스)	National Route 47 (Yeongdong-daero); Prefectural Route 23 (Yeongdong-daero)	Seoul	Gangnam District	
Teheran-ro	Gangnam Police Station IS	강남경찰서 교차로	Teheran-ro 113-gil Teheran-ro 114-gil	Seoul	Gangnam District	
Teheran-ro	Samseong Bridge IS	삼성교 교차로	Teheran-ro 114-gil Yeoksam-ro 107-gil	Seoul	Gangnam District	
Teheran-ro	Samseong Bridge	삼성교		Seoul	Gangnam District	
Olympic-ro	Samseong Bridge			Seoul	Songpa District	
Olympic-ro	Sports Complex IS	종합운동장 교차로	Tancheondong-ro	Seoul	Songpa District	
Olympic-ro	Seoul Sports Complex (South gate) (Sports Complex station)	서울종합운동장 (남문) (종합운동장역)		Seoul	Songpa District	
Olympic-ro	Sports Complex IS	종합운동장 교차로	Baekjegobun-ro	Seoul	Songpa District	
Olympic-ro	Jamsilsaenae station IS	잠실새내역 교차로	Seokchonhosu-ro	Seoul	Songpa District	
Olympic-ro	Jamsil 3 IS	잠실3사거리	Jamsil-ro	Seoul	Songpa District	
Olympic-ro	Lotte World	롯데월드		Seoul	Songpa District	
Olympic-ro	Jamsil station IS (Lotte World Tower)	잠실역 교차로 (롯데월드타워)	National Route 3 (Songpa-daero); Seoul City Route 71 (Songpa-daero)	Seoul	Songpa District	
Olympic-ro	Songpa District Office	송파구청 교차로	Ogeum-ro	Seoul	Songpa District	
Olympic-ro	Olympic Park IS (World Peach Gate) (Mongchontoseong station)	올림픽공원 교차로 (평화의 문) (몽촌토성역)	Wiryeseong-daero	Seoul	Songpa District	
Olympic-ro	Olympic Hall IS (Olympic Park 1st West Gate)	올림픽회관 교차로 (올림픽공원 서1문)	Olympic-ro 35-gil	Seoul	Songpa District	
Olympic-ro	Seongnae Bridge	성내교		Seoul	Songpa District	
Olympic-ro	Olympic Br. IS	올림픽대교남단 교차로	Seoul City Route 60 (Gangdong-daero)	Seoul	Songpa District	
Olympic-ro	Pungnap IS	풍납사거리	Toseong-ro; Gangdong-daero connection road	Seoul	Songpa District	
Olympic-ro	Pungnap IS		Toseong-ro; Gangdong-daero connection road	Seoul	West: Songpa District; East: Gangdong District	
Olympic-ro	Gangdong-gu Office station IS (Gangdong District Office)	강동구청역 교차로 (강동구청)	Seongnae-ro; Cheonhoyet-gil	Seoul	West: Songpa District; East: Gangdong District	
Olympic-ro	Youngpa Girls' High School IS	영파여중고앞 교차로	Pungseong-ro	Seoul	West: Songpa District; East: Gangdong District	
Olympic-ro	Cheonho IS (Cheonho station) (Pungnaptoseong)	천호사거리 (천호역) (풍납토성)	National Route 43 (Cheonho-daero); Seoul City Route 50 (Cheonho-daero)	Seoul	West: Songpa District; East: Gangdong District	
Olympic-ro	Cheonho IS (Cheonho station) (Pungnaptoseong)		National Route 43 (Cheonho-daero); Seoul City Route 50 (Cheonho-daero)	Seoul	Gangdong District	
Olympic-ro	Gwangjin Bridge IS	광진교남단 교차로	Gucheonmyeon-ro	Seoul	Gangdong District	
Olympic-ro	Cheonho-dong Park IS	천호동공원 교차로	Cheonjung-ro	Seoul	Gangdong District	
Olympic-ro	Amsa station IS	암사역 교차로	Sangam-ro	Seoul	Gangdong District	
Olympic-ro	Seonsa IS	선사사거리	Godeok-ro	Seoul	Gangdong District	
Connected with Olympic-ro
