= Gangbyeonbuk-ro =

Road in Seoul, South Korea

Seoul Special Metropolitan City Route 70
- 서울특별시도 제70호선
- Gangbyeon Expressway 강변북로

Route information
- Length: 37.37 km (23.22 mi)
- Existed: 1969–present

Major junctions
- West end: National Route 77 in Mapo, Seoul (Gayang Bridge)
- National Route 1; Seobu Ganseondoro; Naebu Expressway; National Route 6; National Route 46; Dongbu Expressway; National Route 3; National Route 43; Expressway No.100
- East end: National Route 6 in Namyangju, Gyeonggi (Jigeum Jct.)

Location
- Country: South Korea

Highway system
- Highway systems of South Korea; Expressways; National; Local

- Gangbyeonbuk-ro
- Hangul: 강변북로
- Hanja: 江邊北路
- Literal meaning: Riverside Northern Road
- Revised Romanization: Gangbyeonbungno
- McCune–Reischauer: Kangbyŏnbungno

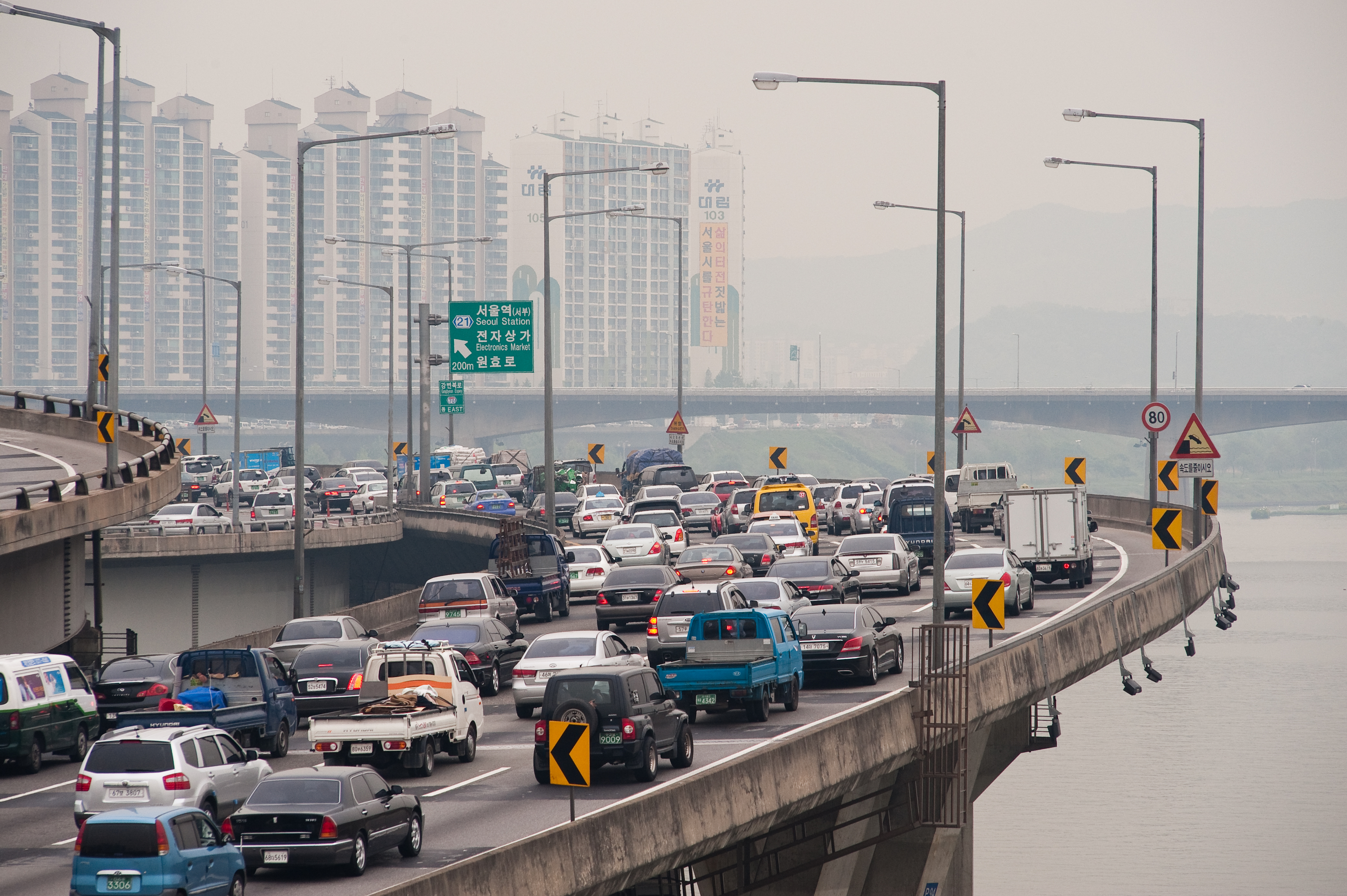
Gangbyeon Expressway in Northern Wonhyo Bridge

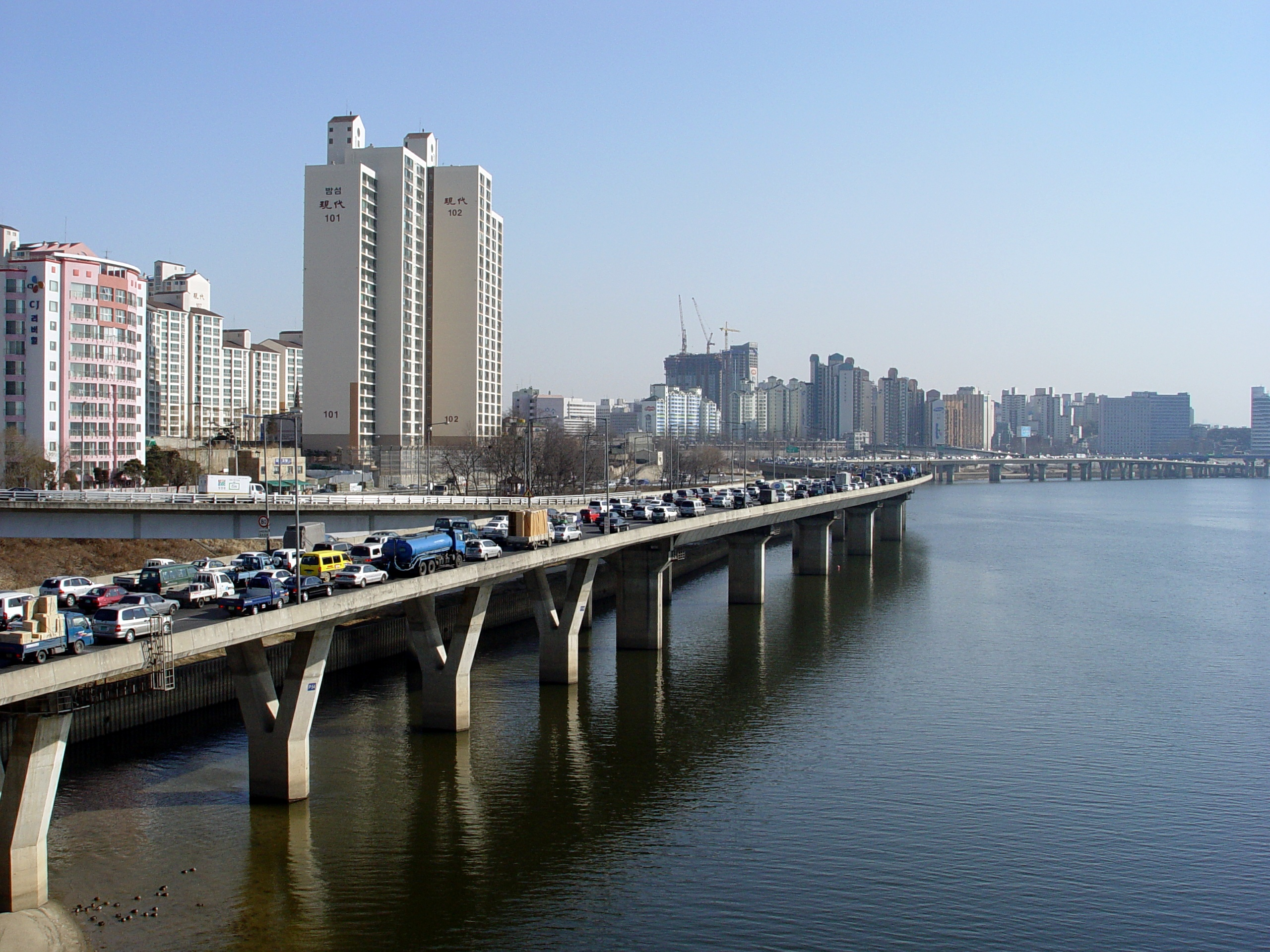
Gangbyeon Expressway in Northern Seogang Bridge

The Gangbyeon Expressway (Korean: 강변북로) is an eight-lane highway located in Seoul, South Korea. It is part of National Route 46 and National Route 77. This route connects Seoul to Namyangju, with a total length of 37.37 km (23.22 mi). The highway is directly connected with the Jayu Motorway (자유로) in the border city located on the Gayang Bridge. The Mapo Bridge–Namyangju section has been designated as National Route 46, while the Yanghwa Bridge–Goyang section is specified as National Route 77. The highway is the main arterial road that connects northern Seoul with satellite cities such as Goyang, Paju, and Namyangju.

== History ==
Construction of the expressway began in 1969, and it opened in 1972. In 1985, it was extended to Haengju Bridge and Cheonho Bridge. At the time the road was completed, it had sections with two, three, and four lanes.

After rapid economic growth and the 1988 Summer Olympics the road was the site of chronic traffic jams. An expansion project began in 1989 and was completed in 1998.

In 2012, Seoul City was expanded and road improvement projects were proposed to the Gangbyeon Expressway, including the underground relocation of the road construction.

== List of facilities ==
- IC: Interchange, JC: Junction, SA: Service Area, TG:Tollgate
- (■): National Route 77
- (■): National Route 46

No.	Name	Korean name	Hanja name	Connections	Notes	Location	
Connected directly with National Route 77(Jayu-ro)(자유로)
6	Gayang Br. IC	가양대교북단	加陽大橋	Gayang-daero (가양대로); Hwagok-ro(화곡로)	Highway start	Mapo	Seoul
7	Nanji Park IC (World Cup Bridge)	난지공원IC (월드컵대교북단)	蘭芝公園交叉路 (월드컵大橋)	Jeungsan-ro (증산로); World Cup Bridge (월드컵대교)		Mapo	Seoul
8	Seongsan JC (Seongsan Bridge)	성산분기점 (성산대교북단)	城山分岐點 (城山大橋)	National Route 1 (Seobu Urban Expressway); National Route 48; Naebu Expressway (내부순환로); Seoul World Cup Stadium; Mapo District Office		Mapo	Seoul
9	Yanghwa Br. IC	양화대교북단	楊花大橋	National Route 6 National Route 77		Mapo	Seoul
10	Seogang Br. IC	서강대교북단	西江大橋	Seogang-ro (서강로); Gukhoe-daero(국회대로) ( Gyeongin Expressway); Nat'l Assembly Hall		Mapo	Seoul
11	Mapo Br. IC	마포대교북단	麻浦大橋	National Route 46; Mapo-daero (마포대로); Yeoui-daero (여의대로); IFC Seoul; FKI Tower; Yeouido Park		Mapo	Seoul
12	Wonhyo Br. IC	원효대교북단	元曉大橋	Yeouidaebang-ro (여의대방로); 63 Building		Yongsan	Seoul
13	Hangang Br. IC	한강대교북단	漢江大橋	Hangang-daero (한강대로); Yongsan Station		Yongsan	Seoul
14	Dongjak Br. IC	동작대교북단	銅雀大橋	Dongjak-daero (동작대로); Ichon station National Museum of Korea	Namyangju-bound only	Yongsan	Seoul
15	Banpo Br. IC	반포대교북단	盤浦大橋	Banpo-daero (반포대로)		Yongsan	Seoul
16	Hannam Br. IC	한남대교북단	漢南大橋	Gangnam-daero (강남대로) ( Gyeongbu Urban Expressway( AH 1)); Hannam station N Seoul Tower		Yongsan	Seoul
17	Seongsu JC (Dongbu Expway Entrance)	성수분기점 (동부간선도로입구)	聖水分岐點 (東部幹線道路入口)	Dongbu Expressway (동부간선도로)		Seongdong	Seoul
18	Seongsu Br. IC	성수대교북단	聖水大橋	Eonju-ro (언주로); Gosanja-ro (고산자로)		Seongdong	Seoul
19	Yeongdong Br. IC	영동대교북단	永東大橋	National Route 47; Yeongdongdaero (영동대로); Dosandaero (도산대로)		Gwangjin	Seoul
20	Cheongdam Br. IC	청담대교북단	淸潭大橋	Dongbu Expressway (동부간선도로); Cheongdam Station		Gwangjin	Seoul
21	Jamsil Br. IC	잠실대교북단	蠶室大橋	National Route 3 (Jamsil-daero/잠실대로); Lotte World Mall		Gwangjin	Seoul
22	Jamsil Railway Br. IC	잠실철교북단	蠶室鐵橋	Gangbyeon Station	Ilsan-bound only	Gwangjin	Seoul
23	Olympic Br. IC	올림픽대교북단	올림픽大橋	Gangdong-daero(강동대로)		Gwangjin	Seoul
24	Cheonho Br. IC	천호대교북단	千戶大橋	National Route 43 (Cheon-daero/천호대로); Achasanseong		Gwangjin	Seoul
25	Gwangjin Br. Ramp	광진교램프	光津橋램프			Gwangjin	Seoul
IC	Acheon IC	아천나들목	峨川나들목	Yangjae-daero; Guri-Amsa Bridge		Guri	Gyeonggi
IC	S. Guri IC	남구리나들목	南九里나들목	Sejong–Pocheon Expressway		Guri	Gyeonggi
IC	Topyeong IC (Gangdong Bridge)	토평나들목	土坪나들목	Capital Region First Ring Expressway		Guri	Gyeonggi
IC	Suseok IC	수석나들목	水石나들목	Suseok-Hopyeong Motorway		Namyangju	Gyeonggi
	Jigeum Jct.	지금삼거리	芝錦交叉路	National Route 6	Highway end	Namyangju	Gyeonggi

== See also ==
- List of streets in Seoul
- Olympicdaero
