= Dongbu Expressway =

Expressway in Seoul, South Korea

Seoul Special Metropolitan City Route 61
- 서울특별시도 제61호선
- Dongbu Expressway 동부간선도로

Route information
- Length: 32.5 km (20.2 mi)
- Existed: 1992–present

Major junctions
- West end: Songpa District, Seoul
- East end: Uijeongbu, Gyeonggi

Location
- Country: South Korea

Highway system
- Highway systems of South Korea; Expressways; National; Local

Dongbu Expressway (Korean: 동부간선도로) is an urban expressway located in Gyeonggi and Seoul, South Korea. With a total length of 32.5 km (20.2 mi), this expressway starts from the Bokjeong Interchange in Songpa District, Seoul to Sangchon Interchange in Uijeongbu City, Gyeonggi.

== Stopovers ==
Seoul

- Songpa District - Gangnam District - Gwangjin District - Seongdong District - Dongdaemun District / Gwangjin District - Dongdaemun District / Jungnang District - Nowon District

Gyeonggi Province

- Uijeongbu

== List of Facilities ==
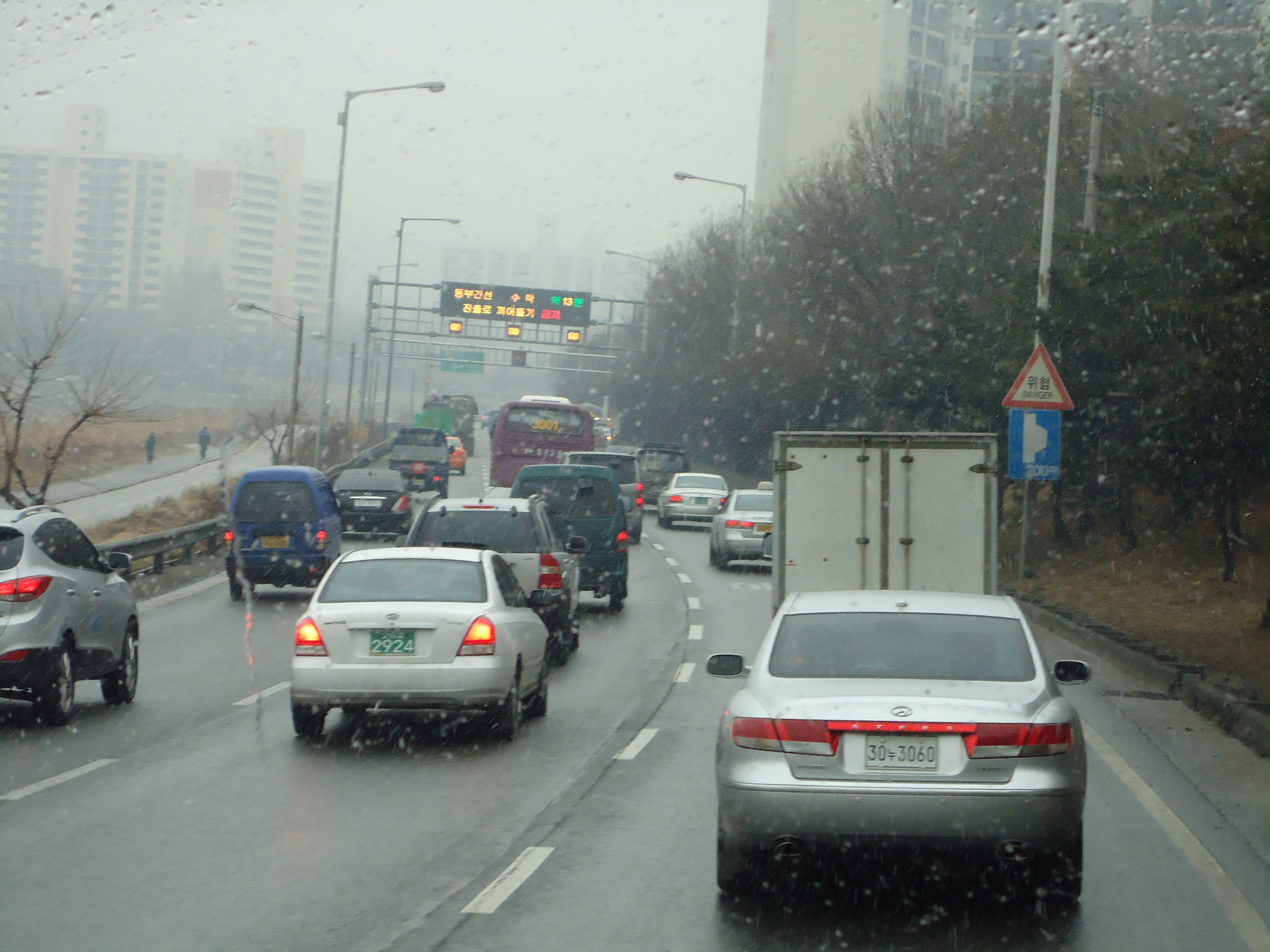
This expressway always has traffic congestion.

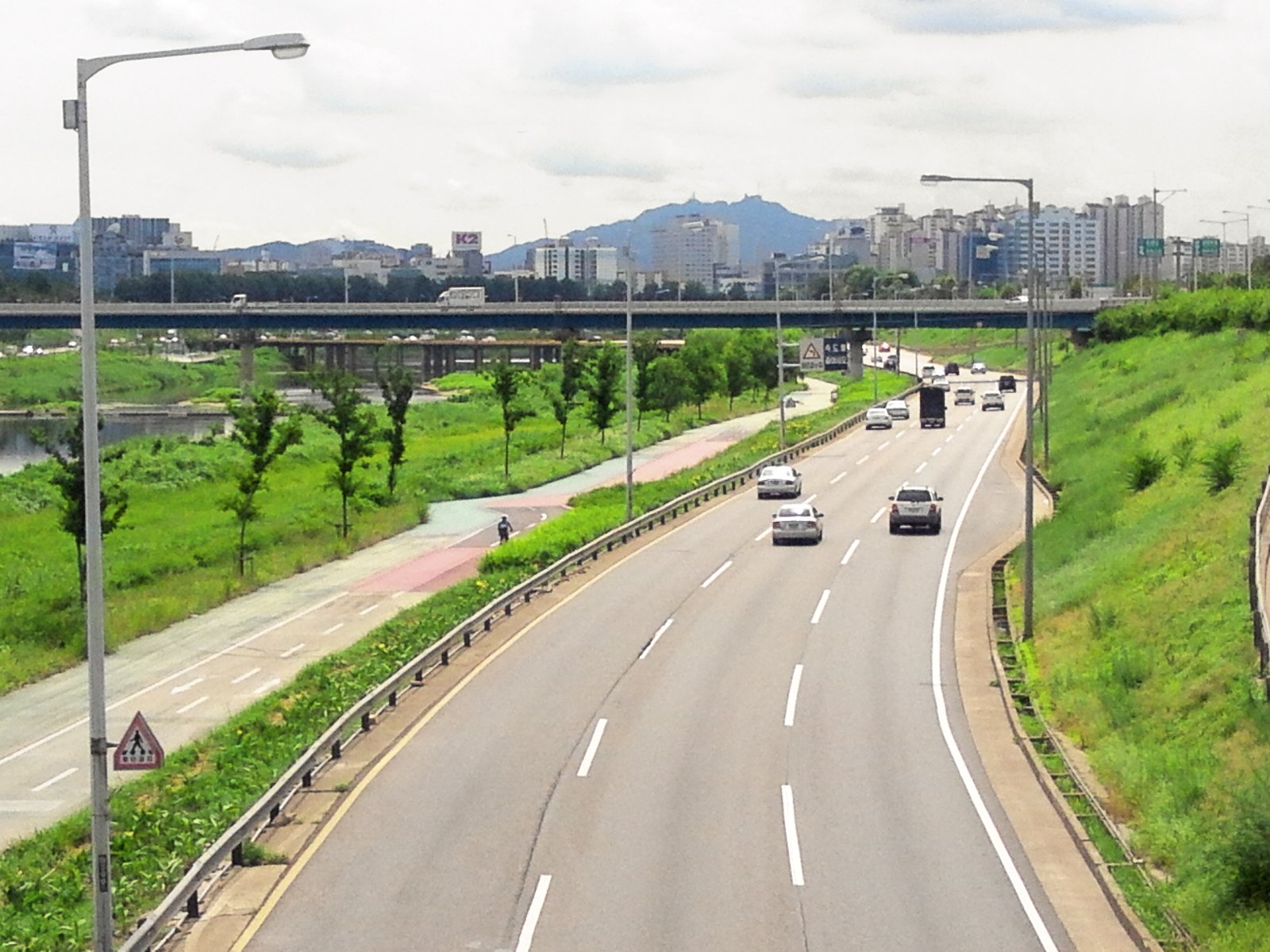
Near Songjeong Bridge

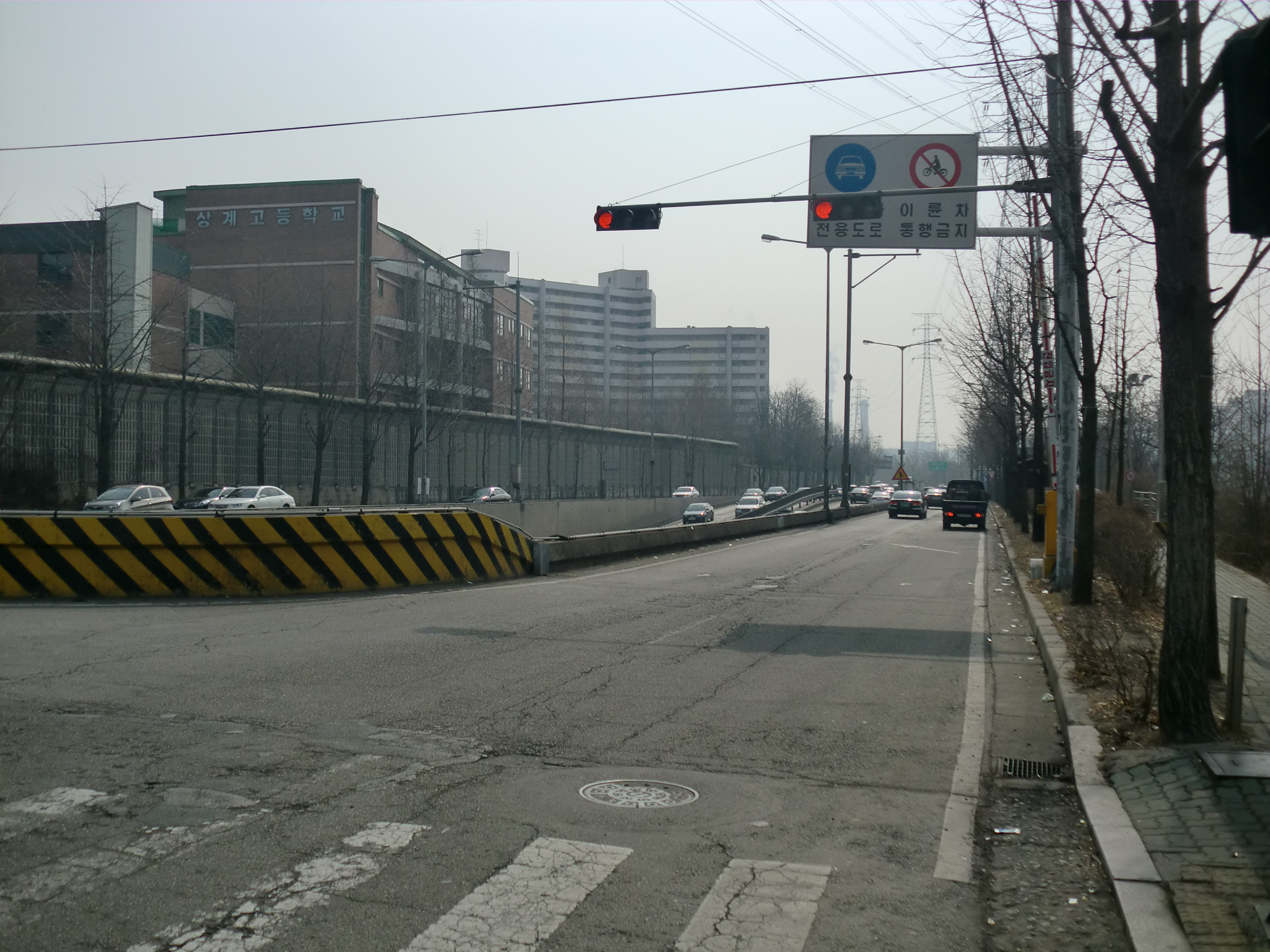
Changdong IC

IC : Interchange (나들목)
JC : Junction (분기점)
IS : Intersection (평면교차로)
BR : Bridge (교량)

Type	Name	Hangul name	Connection	Location		Note
Connected with Bundang-Suseo Urban Expressway
IC	Bokjeong	복정 교차로	Heolleung-ro	Seoul	Songpa District	Terminus
IC	Jagok	자곡 나들목	Jagok-ro	Seoul	Gangnam District	
IC	Tancheon 1 Bridge	탄천1교	Seoul City Route 92 (Nambu Beltway)	Seoul	Gangnam District	
IC	Suseo	수서 나들목	Local Route 23 (Yangjae-daero)	Seoul	Gangnam District	
JC	Cheongdam Br. JC	청담대교 분기점	Seoul City Route 88 (Olympic-daero); Bongeusa-ro	Seoul	Gangnam District	
BR	Cheongdam Bridge	청담대교		Seoul	Gangnam District	
BR	Cheongdam Bridge	청담대교		Seoul	Gwangjin District	
JC	Cheongdam Br. JC (North side)	청담대교 북단	National Route 46; Seoul City Route 70 (Gangbyeonbuk-ro); Neungdong-ro	Seoul	Gwangjin District	
IC	Yeongdong Br.	영동대교 북단	National Route 47; Local Route 23 (Yeongdong-daero) (Dongil-ro)	Seoul	Gwangjin District	Local Route 23 overlap
IC	Yeongdong Br.	영동대교 북단	National Route 47; Local Route 23 (Yeongdong-daero) (Dongil-ro)	Seoul	Seongdong District	Local Route 23 overlap
IC	Unnamed	명칭 미상	Wangsimni-ro	Seoul	Seongdong District	National Route 46, Local Route 23 overlap
JC	Seongsu Br. JC	성수대교 분기점	National Route 46; Seoul City Route 70 (Gangbyeonbuk-ro); Seoul City Route 51 (Eonju-ro) (Gosanja-ro); Ttukseom-ro	Seoul	Seongdong District	National Route 46, Local Route 23 overlap
IC	Yongbi Bridge	용비교	Ttukseom-ro	Seoul	Seongdong District	
IC	Eungbong Bridge	응봉교	Seoul City Route 51 (Gosanja-ro)	Seoul	Seongdong District	
-	Seongdong Bridge Seongdong Railway Bridge	성동교 성동철교	Wangsimni-ro; Line 2	Seoul	Seongdong District	Can't access from both directions
JC	Seongdong JC	성동 분기점	Seoul City Route 30 (Naebu Expressway)	Seoul	Seongdong District	
-	Jangan Railway Bridge	장안철교	Line 2	Seoul	Seongdong District	
IC	Gunja Bridge	군자교	Seoul City Route 50 (Cheonho-daero)	Seoul	Seongdong District	
IC	Gunja Bridge	군자교	Seoul City Route 50 (Cheonho-daero)	Seoul	West: Dongdaemun District; East: Gwangjin District	
-	Jangpyeong Bridge	장평교	Dapsimni-ro	Seoul	West: Dongdaemun District; East: Gwangjin District	Can't access from both directions
IC	Jangan Bridge	장안교	Sagajeong-ro	Seoul	West: Dongdaemun District; East: Jungnang District	
-	Gyeomjae Bridge	겸재교	Gyeomjae-ro	Seoul	West: Dongdaemun District; East: Jungnang District	Can't access from both directions
IC	Jungnang Bridge	중랑교	National Route 6 (Mangu-ro)	Seoul	West: Dongdaemun District; East: Jungnang District	
-	Jungnang Railway Bridge	중랑철교	Jungang Line	Seoul	West: Dongdaemun District; East: Jungnang District	
-	Imun Railway Bridge	이문철교	Mangu Line	Seoul	West: Dongdaemun District; East: Jungnang District	
-	Ihwa Bridge	이화교	Bonghwasan-ro	Seoul	West: Dongdaemun District; East: Jungnang District	Can't access from both directions
JC	Wolleung (Wolleung Bridge)	월릉 나들목 (월릉교)	Bukbu Expressway; Seoul City Route 20 (Hwarang-ro); Madeul-ro; Seombat-ro	Seoul	Nowon District	
-	Hancheon Bridge	한천교	Seombat-ro	Seoul	Nowon District	Can't access from both directions
-	Gyeongchun Railway Bridge	경춘철교		Seoul	Nowon District	
IC	Wolgye 1 Bridge	월계1교	Wolgye-ro; Hangeulbiseong-ro	Seoul	Nowon District	
IS	Nokcheon Bridge	녹천교	Deongneung-ro	Seoul	Nowon District	Madeul Underpass section
IS	Unnamed	명칭 미상	Dongil-ro 213-gil	Seoul	Nowon District	
IS	Unnamed	명칭 미상	Dongil-ro 215-gil	Seoul	Nowon District	
IS	Changdong Bridge	창동교	Nohae-ro	Seoul	Nowon District	Nowon Underpass section
-	Changdong Railway Bridge	창동철교	Line 4	Seoul	Nowon District	
IS	Sanggye Bridge	상계교	Nowon-ro; Banghak-ro	Seoul	Nowon District	Sanggye Underpass section
IS	Unnamed	명칭 미상	Hangeulbiseong-ro	Seoul	Nowon District	
IS	Unnamed	명칭 미상	Dongil-ro 227-gil	Seoul	Nowon District	
IS	Unnamed	명칭 미상	Suraksan-ro	Seoul	Nowon District	
IS	Nowon Bridge	노원교	National Route 3 (Dongil-ro 243-gil)	Seoul	Nowon District	Surak Overpass section
IC	Surak Underpass	수락지하차도	National Route 3 (Dongil-ro)	Seoul	Nowon District	Underpass only for Uijeongbu-bound
IC	Sangchon	상촌 교차로	National Route 3 (Dongil-ro)	Gyeonggi	Uijeongbu	Terminus
Connected with National Route 3 Dongil-ro

== See also ==
- Roads and expressways in South Korea
- Transportation in South Korea
