= Bukbu Expressway =

Highway in South Korea

Seoul Special Metropolitan City Route 03 Bukbu Expressway
- 서울특별시도 제03호선 북부간선도로

Route information
- Length: 14.4 km (8.9 mi)
- Existed: 1997–present

Major junctions
- From: Seongbuk District, Seoul
- To: Namyangju, Gyeonggi Province

Location
- Country: South Korea

Highway system
- Highway systems of South Korea; Expressways; National; Local

Bukbu Expressway (Korean: 북부간선도로) is a highway located in Seoul and Gyeonggi Province, South Korea. With a total length of 14.4 km (8.9 mi), this road starts from the Hawolgok Interchange in Seongbuk District, Seoul to Donong Interchange in Namyangju.

== History ==
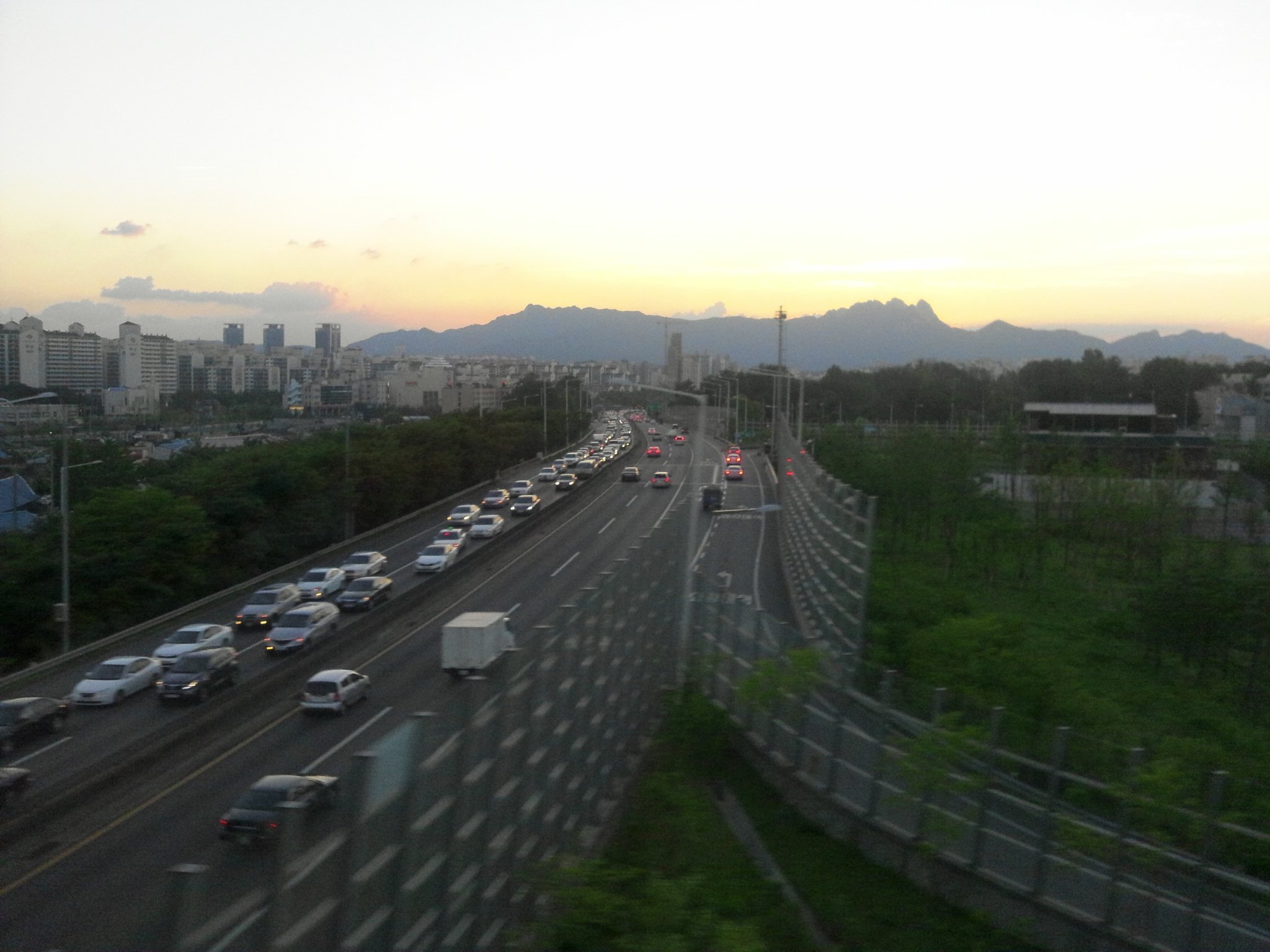
Sinnae Interchange in evening

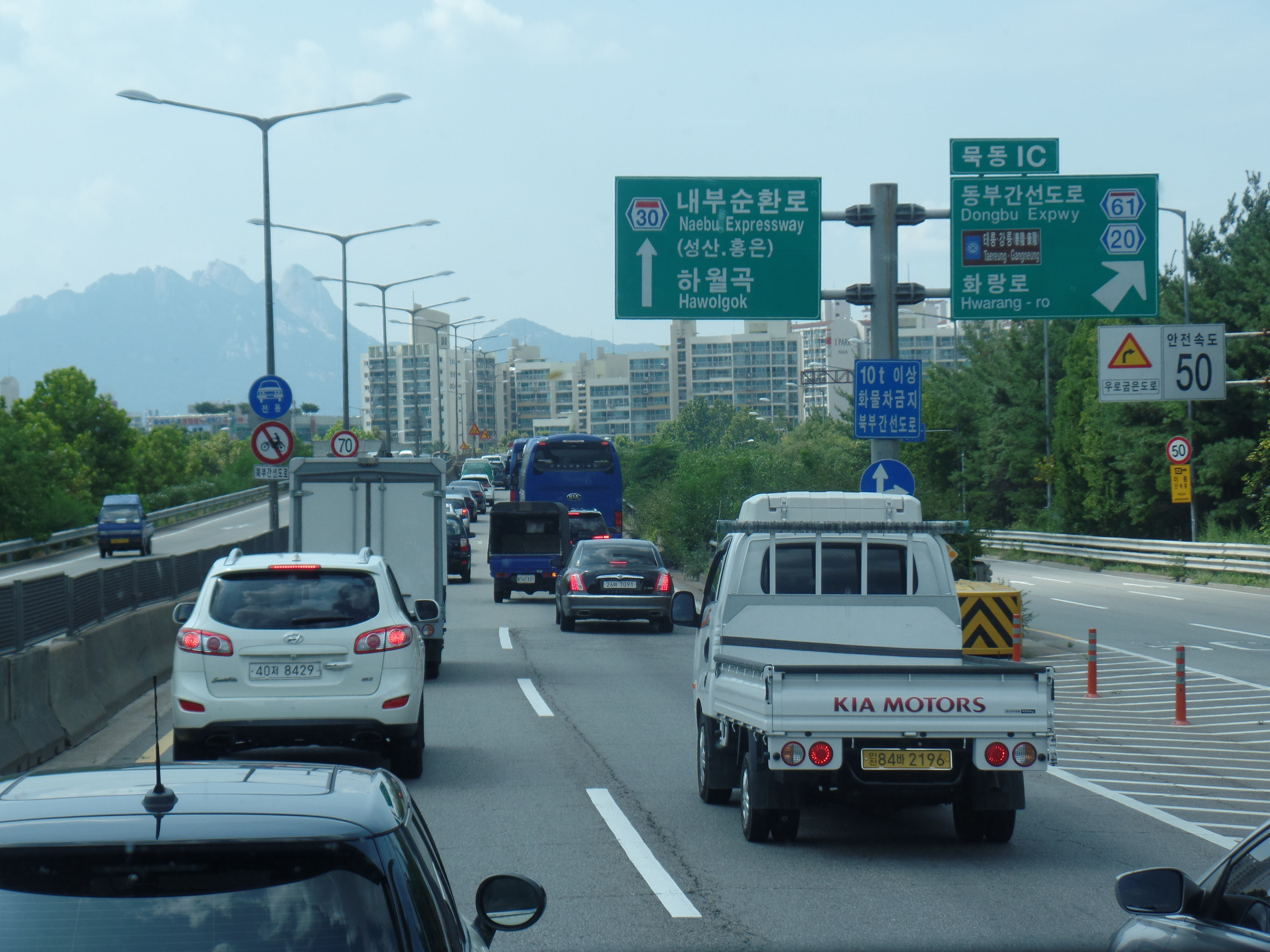
Mukdong Interchange

This route was established on 10 May 1997.

== Stopovers ==
Seoul

- Seongbuk District - Nowon District - Jungnang District

Gyeonggi Province

- Guri - Namyangju

== List of Facilities ==
  - IC : 나들목(Interchange)
  - JC : 분기점(Junction)
  - BR : 교량(Bridge)
- (■) : Motorway section

Type	Name	Korean name	Connection	Location		Note
Connected with Naebu Expressway
JC	Hawolgok	하월곡 분기점	Seoul City Route 30 (Naebu Expressway)	Seoul	Seongbuk District	
IC	Hawolgok IC	하월곡 나들목	Seoul City Route 20 (Hwarang-ro); Wolgok-ro	Seoul	Seongbuk District	Namyangju-bound Only
IC	Wolleung IC	월릉 나들목	Seoul City Route 61 (Dongbu Expressway)	Seoul	Seongbuk District	Namyangju-bound Only
IC	Mukdong IC	묵동 나들목	Seoul City Route 20 (Hwarang-ro); Nowon-ro	Seoul	Jungnang District	Namyangju-bound Only
BR	Bonghwa Bridge	봉화교		Seoul	Jungnang District	
IC	Sinnae IC	신내 나들목	National Route 47; Seoul City Route 71 (Gyeongchunbuk-ro, Yongmasan-ro)	Seoul	Jungnang District	
IC	Jungnang IC	중랑 나들목	Sejong-Pocheon Expressway	Seoul	Jungnang District	
IS	(Underpass)	(지하차도)	Inchang 2-ro	Guri	Inchang-dong	
IC	Inchang IC	인창 나들목	Inchang 1-ro	Guri	Inchang-dong	
IC	Dongchang IC	동창 나들목	National Route 43; National Route 46 (Donggureung-ro)	Guri	Inchang-dong	Seoul-bound Only
IC	Guri IC	구리 나들목	Seoul Ring Expressway	Guri	Inchang-dong	
BR	Wangsukcheon Bridge	왕숙천교		Guri	Inchang-dong	
BR	Wangsukcheon Bridge	왕숙천교		Namyangju	Dasan-dong	
IC	(Donong 1 Bridge)	(도농1교)	Donong-ro	Namyangju	Dasan-dong	
BR	(Donong 2 Bridge)	(도농2교)		Namyangju	Dasan-dong	
IC	(Donong 3 Bridge)	(도농3교)	Migeum-ro 189beon-gil	Namyangju	Dasan-dong	Seoul-bound Only
IC	(Donong 5 Bridge)	(도농5교)	Local Route 383 (Jingwan-ro)	Namyangju	Dasan-dong	Namyangju-bound Only
IC	Donong IC	도농 나들목	National Route 6 (Gyeonggang-ro); Gyeongchun-ro	Namyangju	Dasan-dong	Seoul-bound Only
Connected with Gyeonggang-ro
