= Jamsil Railway Bridge =

Railway bridge in Seoul, South Korea

Coordinates: 37.52894°N 127.09864°E

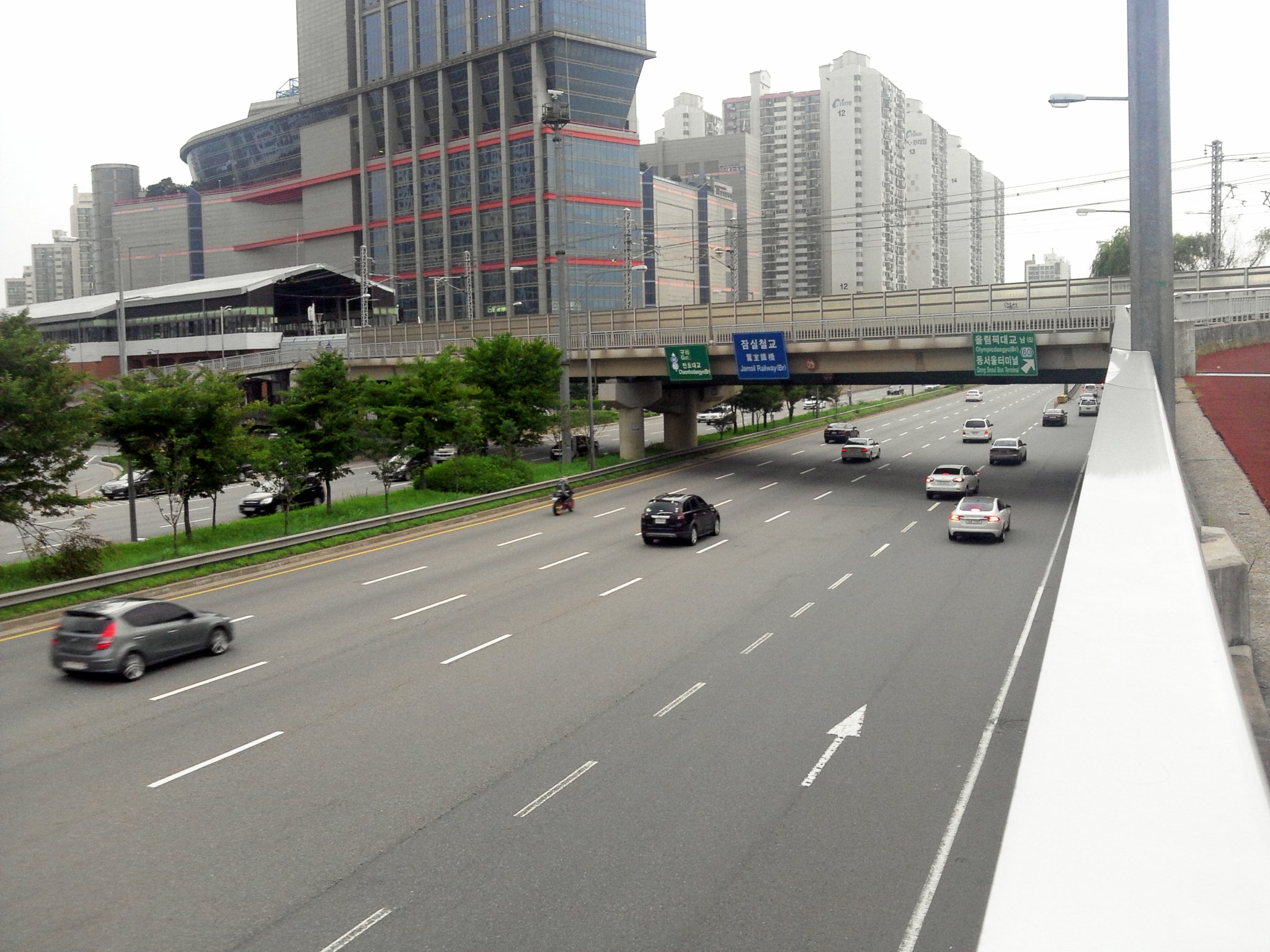
- Road on the bridge (lower)

Korean name
- Hangul: 잠실철교
- Hanja: 蠶室鐵橋
- RR: Jamsil cheolgyo
- MR: Chamsil ch'ŏlgyo

The Jamsil Railway Bridge (Korean: 잠실철교) is a bridge over the Han River in Seoul, South Korea. The bridge was completed in 1979. It is 1,270 m (4,170 ft) long.
