= Seoul City Route 51 =

Road in South Korea

Seoul Special Metropolitan City Route 51
- 서울특별시도 제51호선

Route information
- Length: 31 km (19 mi)

Major junctions
- From: Seocho District, Seoul
- To: Dobong District, Seoul

Location
- Country: South Korea

Highway system
- Highway systems of South Korea; Expressways; National; Local

Seoul Metropolitan City Route 51 (Korean: 서울특별시도 제51호선) is an urban road located in Seoul, South Korea. With a total length of 31 km (19 mi), this road starts from the Naegok Tunnel in Seocho District, Seoul to Dobongsan Station in Dobong District.

== Stopovers ==
Seoul

- Seocho District - Gangnam District - Seongdong District - Dongdaemun District - Seongbuk District - Gangbuk District - Dobong District

== List of Facilities ==
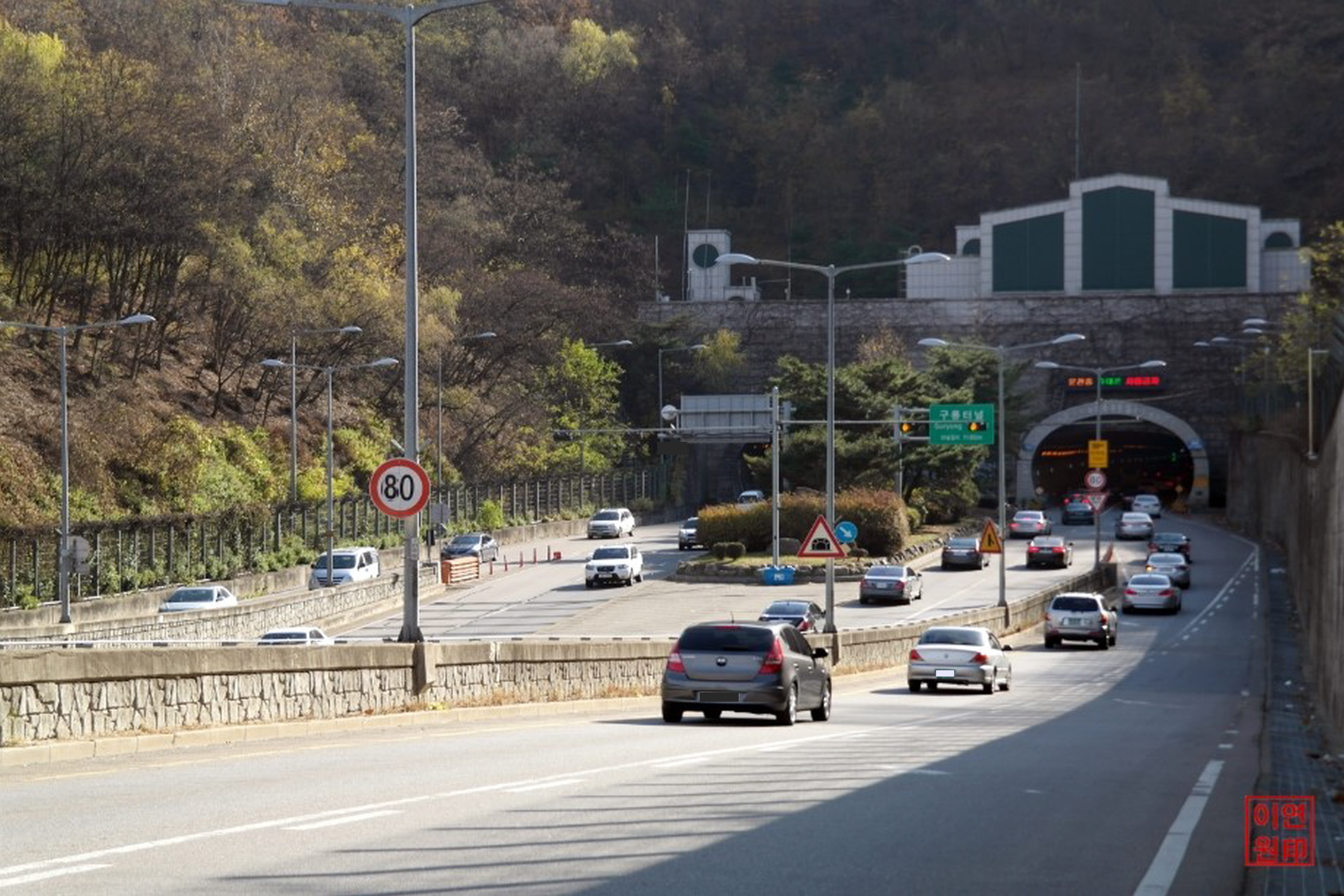
Guryong Tunnel

IS: Intersection, IC: Interchange

- (■): Motorway section

Road name	Name	Hangul name	Connection	Location		Note
Connected with Bundang-Naegok Urban Expressway
Eonju-ro	Naegok Tunnel	내곡터널		Seoul	Seocho District	Approximately 1,059m
Eonju-ro	Naegok IC	내곡 나들목	Seoul City Route 41 (Heolleung-ro)	Seoul	Seocho District	
Eonju-ro	Guryong Tunnel	구룡터널		Seoul	Seocho District	Approximately 1,180m
Eonju-ro	Guryong Tunnel			Seoul	Gangnam District	Approximately 1,180m
Eonju-ro	Guryong Tunnel IS (Gaepi Underpass)	구룡터널 교차로 (개포지하차도)	National Route 47 (Yangjae-daero)	Seoul	Gangnam District	
Eonju-ro	Kuryong Elementary School IS	구룡초교 교차로	Gaepo-ro	Seoul	Gangnam District	
Eonju-ro	Yeongdong 3 Bridge	영동3교		Seoul	Gangnam District	
Eonju-ro	Maebong Tunnel IS	매봉터널 교차로	Seoul City Route 92 (Nambu Beltway)	Seoul	Gangnam District	
Eonju-ro	Maebong Tunnel	매봉터널		Seoul	Gangnam District	Approximately 250m
Eonju-ro	Yonsei University Gangnam Severance Hospital	연세대학교 강남세브란스병원		Seoul	Gangnam District	
Eonju-ro	Gangnam Severance IS	강남세브란스 교차로	Dogok-ro	Seoul	Gangnam District	
Eonju-ro	Gaenari Apartment IS	개나리아파트 교차로	Yeoksam-ro	Seoul	Gangnam District	
Eonju-ro	Renaissance Hotels	르네상스호텔사거리	Seoul City Route 90 (Teheran-ro)	Seoul	Gangnam District	
Eonju-ro	Kyeongbok Apartment	경복아파트 교차로	Bongeunsa-ro	Seoul	Gangnam District	
Eonju-ro	Seoul Main Customs IS	서울세관사거리	Hakdong-ro	Seoul	Gangnam District	
Eonju-ro	Seoul Main Customs	서울세관		Seoul	Gangnam District	
Eonju-ro	Dosan Park IS	도산공원 교차로	Dosan-daero	Seoul	Gangnam District	
Eonju-ro	Seongsu Bridge IS (South)	성수대교남단 교차로	Apgujeong-ro	Seoul	Gangnam District	
Eonju-ro	Seongsu Bridge IC (South)	성수대교남단 나들목	Seoul City Route 88 (Olympic-daero)	Seoul	Gangnam District	
Eonju-ro	Seongsu Bridge	성수대교		Seoul	Gangnam District	
Gosanja-ro	Seongsu Bridge			Seoul	Seongdong District	
Gosanja-ro	Seongsu Bridge IC (North)	성수대교북단 나들목	National Route 46; Prefectural Route 23; Seoul City Route 70 (Gangbyeonbuk-ro); Seoul City Route 61 (Dongbu Expressway)	Seoul	Seongdong District	
Gosanja-ro	Seongsu Bridge IS (North)	성수대교북단 교차로	Ttukseom-ro	Seoul	Seongdong District	
Gosanja-ro	Eungbong Bridge IS (Eungbong Underpass)	응봉교 교차로 (응봉지하차도)	Seoul City Route 61 (Dongbu Expressway); Gwangnaru-ro	Seoul	Seongdong District	You can enter Dongbu Expressway by using Eungbong Underpass
Gosanja-ro	Eungbong Bridge	응봉교		Seoul	Seongdong District	Former Seongsu Bridge
Gosanja-ro	Eungbong Station	응봉역		Seoul	Seongdong District	
Gosanja-ro	Eungbong IS	응봉삼거리	Dokseodang-ro	Seoul	Seongdong District	
Gosanja-ro	Muhak Girls' High School IS	무학여고앞 교차로	Haengdang-ro; Gosanja-ro 10-gil	Seoul	Seongdong District	
Gosanja-ro	Wangsimni Station (Seongdong Underpass)	왕십리역 교차로 (성동지하차도)	Seoul City Route 60 (Wangsimni-ro); Wangsimnigwangjang-ro	Seoul	Seongdong District	
Gosanja-ro	Seongdong-gu Office	성동구청		Seoul	Seongdong District	
Gosanja-ro	Doseon IS	도선사거리	Majang-ro	Seoul	Seongdong District	
Gosanja-ro	Seoul Facility Management Corporation IS (Gosanja Bridge)	서울시설공단 교차로 (고산자교)	Seoul City Route 50 (Cheonggyecheon-ro); Salgoji-gil	Seoul	Seongdong District	
Gosanja-ro	Dongdaemun-gu Office (Yongdu Station)	동대문구청 교차로 (용두역)	Cheonho-daero	Seoul	Dongdaemun District	
Gosanja-ro	Gyeongdong Market IS	경동시장사거리	National Route 6 (Wangsan-ro)	Seoul	Dongdaemun District	
Gosanja-ro	Gyeongdong Market	경동시장		Seoul	Dongdaemun District	
Gosanja-ro	Jegi IS	제기사거리	Yangnyeongsi-ro	Seoul	Dongdaemun District	
Gosanja-ro	Hongpa Elementary School IS	홍파초교 교차로	Jegi-ro	Seoul	Dongdaemun District	
Gosanja-ro	2nd Jegi Bridge	제2제기교	Gosanja-ro 58-gil Gosanja-ro 60-gil Jegi-ro 7-gil Jegi-ro 9-gil	Seoul	Dongdaemun District	
Gosanja-ro	Korea University IS (Korea University Station IS)	고려대삼거리 (고려대역 교차로)	Anam-ro	Seoul	Dongdaemun District	
Jongam-ro	Korea University IS (Korea University Station IS)		Anam-ro	Seoul	Dongdaemun District	
Jongam-ro	Korea University IS	고려대앞 교차로	Hoegi-ro	Seoul	Seongbuk District	
Jongam-ro	Gaeunsan Entrance IS	개운산입구 교차로	Bugaksan-ro	Seoul	Seongbuk District	
Jongam-ro	University High School IS	사대부고앞 교차로	Wolgok-ro	Seoul	Seongbuk District	
Jongam-ro	Seoul Jongam Police Station	서울종암경찰서		Seoul	Seongbuk District	
Jongam-ro	Jongam IS	종암사거리	Seoul City Route 20 (Jeongneung-ro) (Hwarang-ro)	Seoul	Seongbuk District	
Jongam-ro	Mia IS	미아사거리	Dongsomun-ro; Wolgye-ro	Seoul	Seongbuk District	
Dobong-ro	Mia IS		Dongsomun-ro; Wolgye-ro	Seoul	Gangbuk District	
Dobong-ro	Miasageori Station	미아사거리역	Sungin-ro	Seoul	Gangbuk District	
Dobong-ro	Samyang Entrance IS	삼양입구사거리	Solsaem-ro; Ohyeon-ro; Dobong-ro 15-gil Dobong-ro 10-gil	Seoul	Gangbuk District	
Dobong-ro	Mia Station IS	미아역 교차로	Solmae-ro	Seoul	Gangbuk District	
Dobong-ro	Suyu IS	수유사거리	Deongneung-ro; Nohae-ro	Seoul	Gangbuk District	
Dobong-ro	Suyu Station IS	수유역 교차로	Opaesan-ro; Dobong-ro 87-gil	Seoul	Gangbuk District	
Dobong-ro	Gangbuk-gu Office IS	강북구청 교차로	Hancheon-ro	Seoul	Gangbuk District	
Dobong-ro	Ui Bridge	우이교		Seoul	Gangbuk District	
Dobong-ro	Ui Bridge			Seoul	Dobong District	
Dobong-ro	Ui Bridge IS	우이교 교차로	Uicheon-ro	Seoul	Dobong District	
Dobong-ro	Changdong Market Entrance	창동시장입구	Dobong-ro 109-gil Dobong-ro 110-gil	Seoul	Dobong District	
Dobong-ro	Ssangmun Station	쌍문역		Seoul	Dobong District	
Dobong-ro	Jeongui Girls' Middle School Entrance IS	정의여중입구 교차로	Nohae-ro	Seoul	Dobong District	
Dobong-ro	Dobong Health Center IS	도봉보건소 교차로	Haedong-ro	Seoul	Dobong District	
Dobong-ro	(Unnamed)	(명칭 미상)	Dobong-ro 136-gil	Seoul	Dobong District	
Dobong-ro	Banghak IS	방학사거리	Banghak-ro	Seoul	Dobong District	
Dobong-ro	Banghak Station IS	방학역 교차로	Dodang-ro	Seoul	Dobong District	
Dobong-ro	Sindobong IS	신도봉사거리	Sirubong-ro; Dobong-ro 154-gil	Seoul	Dobong District	
Dobong-ro	Dobong Station IS	도봉역 교차로	National Route 3 (Dobong-ro 170-gil); Dobong-ro 169-gil	Seoul	Dobong District	National Route 3 overlap
Dobong-ro	Dobong Bridge	도봉교		Seoul	Dobong District	National Route 3 overlap
Dobong-ro	(Unnamed)	(명칭 미상)	Dobong-ro 180-gil Dobong-ro 181-gil	Seoul	Dobong District	National Route 3 overlap
Dobong-ro	Dobongsan Station IS	도봉산역 교차로	Dobongsan-gil	Seoul	Dobong District	National Route 3 overlap
Dobong-ro	(Unnamed)	(명칭 미상)	Madeul-ro	Seoul	Dobong District	National Route 3 overlap
Connected with National Route 3 (Pyeonghwa-ro)
