= Seoul City Route 20 =

Road in Seoul, South Korea

Seoul Special Metropolitan City Route 20
- 서울특별시도 제20호선

Route information
- Length: 21.3 km (13.2 mi)

Major junctions
- From: Eunpyeong District, Seoul
- To: Nowon District, Seoul

Location
- Country: South Korea

Highway system
- Highway systems of South Korea; Expressways; National; Local

Seoul Metropolitan City Route 20 (Korean: 서울특별시도 제20호선) is a road located in Seoul, South Korea. With a total length of 21.3 km (13.2 mi), this road starts from the Seooreung Nature Park in Eunpyeong District, Seoul to Sahmyook University in Nowon District.

== Stopovers ==
Seoul

- Eunpyeong District - Jongno District - Seongbuk District - Nowon District

== List of Facilities ==
IS: Intersection, IC: Interchange

Road name	Name	Hangul name	Connection	Location		Note
Connected with Seooreung-ro
Seooreung-ro	City boundary (Seooreung Entrance)	시경계 (서오릉입구)		Seoul	Eunpyeong District	
Seooreung-ro	Gusan IS	구산사거리	Galhyeon-ro	Seoul	Eunpyeong District	
Seooreung-ro	Gusan Station IS	구산역 교차로	National Route 1 (Yeonseo-ro)	Seoul	Eunpyeong District	
Seooreung-ro	Yeokchon IS	역촌사거리	Yeongmal-ro	Seoul	Eunpyeong District	
Seooreung-ro	Yeokchon Station IS	역촌역 교차로	Seooreung-ro; Jinheung-ro	Seoul	Eunpyeong District	
Jinheung-ro	Yeokchon Station IS		Seooreung-ro; Jinheung-ro	Seoul	Eunpyeong District	
Jinheung-ro	Bulgwang Market IS	대조,불광시장 교차로	Bulgwang-ro	Seoul	Eunpyeong District	
Jinheung-ro	(Former Korea Centers for Disease Control and Prevention Headquarter)	(구 질병관리본부)	Seoul City Route 21 (Tongil-ro)	Seoul	Eunpyeong District	
Jinheung-ro	Gugi Tunnel	구기터널		Seoul	Eunpyeong District	Length: 610m
Jinheung-ro	Gugi Tunnel	구기터널		Seoul	Jongno District	Length: 610m
Jinheung-ro	(Gugi Tunnel)	(구기터널앞)	Bibong-gil	Seoul	Jongno District	
Jinheung-ro	Sinyeong-dong IS	신영동삼거리	Segeomjeong-ro	Seoul	Jongno District	
Pyeongchangmunhwa-ro	Sinyeong-dong IS		Segeomjeong-ro	Seoul	Jongno District	
Pyeongchangmunhwa-ro	Bukak Tunnel	북악터널		Seoul	Jongno District	Length: 810m
Jeongneung-ro	Bukak Tunnel	북악터널		Seoul	Seongbuk District	Length: 810m
Jeongneung-ro	Kookmin University	국민대학교		Seoul	Seongbuk District	
Jeongneung-ro	Kookmin University Entrance IC	국민대입구IC	Seoul City Route 30 (Naebu Expressway)	Seoul	Seongbuk District	Below Naebu Expressway
Jeongneung-ro	Unnamed	(명칭 미상)	Solsaem-ro	Seoul	Seongbuk District	Below Naebu Expressway
Jeongneung-ro	Jeongneung IC	정릉IC	Seoul City Route 30 (Naebu Expressway)	Seoul	Seongbuk District	Below Naebu Expressway
Jeongneung-ro	Jeongneung Entrance IS	정릉입구 교차로	Bogukmun-ro	Seoul	Seongbuk District	Below Naebu Expressway
Jeongneung-ro	Arirang Pass Entrance IS	아리랑고개입구 교차로	Arirang-ro	Seoul	Seongbuk District	Below Naebu Expressway
Jeongneung-ro	Gileum Bridge IS	길음교 교차로	Seoul City Route 41 (Dongsomun-ro)	Seoul	Seongbuk District	Below Naebu Expressway
Jeongneung-ro	(Gireum Station)	(길음역)	Seoul City Route 41 (Samyang-ro · Dongsomun-ro)	Seoul	Seongbuk District	Below Naebu Expressway
Jeongneung-ro	Gileum IC	길음IC	Seoul City Route 30 (Naebu Expressway)	Seoul	Seongbuk District	Below Naebu Expressway
Jeongneung-ro	Jongam IS	종암사거리	Seoul City Route 51 (Jongam-ro)	Seoul	Seongbuk District	Below Naebu Expressway
Hwarang-ro	Jongam IS		Seoul City Route 51 (Jongam-ro)	Seoul	Seongbuk District	Below Naebu Expressway
Hwarang-ro	Seongbuk Teurijeum Building	성북트리즘빌딩	Opaesan-ro	Seoul	Seongbuk District	Below Bukbu Expressway; One way section
Hwarang-ro	Wolgok Station IS (Wolgok IC)	월곡역 교차로 (월곡IC)	Wolgok-ro; Seoul City Route 30 (Naebu Expressway)	Seoul	Seongbuk District	Below Bukbu Expressway; One way section
Hwarang-ro	Hawolgok IC	하월곡IC	Bukbu Expressway	Seoul	Seongbuk District	Below Bukbu Expressway
Hwarang-ro	Sangwolgok Station IS	상월곡역 교차로	Jangwol-ro	Seoul	Seongbuk District	Below Bukbu Expressway
Hwarang-ro	Dolgoji Station IS	돌곶이역 교차로	Dolgoji-ro	Seoul	Seongbuk District	Below Bukbu Expressway
Hwarang-ro	Jangwi IS	장위사거리	Hancheon-ro	Seoul	Seongbuk District	Below Bukbu Expressway
Hwarang-ro	Seokgye Station IS(West)	석계역 교차로(서부)	Seokgye-ro; Hancheon-ro 66-gil	Seoul	Seongbuk District	Elevated section
Hwarang-ro	Seokgye Station IS(East)	석계역 교차로(동부)	Hancheon-ro 45-gil Hancheon-ro 48-gil	Seoul	Seongbuk District	Elevated section
Hwarang-ro	Wolleung Bridge (Wolleung IC)	월릉교 (월릉IC)	Seoul City Route 61 (Dongbu Expressway); Bukbu Expressway; Madeul-ro; Seombat-ro	Seoul	Nowon District	
Hwarang-ro	Taereung Station IS	태릉입구역 교차로	National Route 3 (Dongil-ro)	Seoul	Nowon District	
Hwarang-ro	(Former Bukbu Prosecutor's Office Entrance)	(구 북부검찰청입구)	Gongneung-ro	Seoul	Nowon District	
Hwarang-ro	Hwarangdae Station IS	화랑대역 교차로	Sinnae-ro	Seoul	Nowon District	
Hwarang-ro	Hwarangdae IS (Mokdong IC)	화랑대사거리 (묵동IC)	Bukbu Expressway; Nowon-ro	Seoul	Nowon District	
Hwarang-ro	(Korea Military Academy Entrance)	(육군사관학교 입구)	Korea Military Academy	Seoul	Nowon District	
Hwarang-ro	Seoul Women's University Taereung·Gangreung Korea National Training Center Sahmyook University	서울여자대학교 태릉·강릉 태릉선수촌 삼육대학교		Seoul	Nowon District	
Hwarang-ro	Damteo IS (city boundary)	담터사거리 (시경계)	Bulam-ro; Damteo-gil	Seoul	Nowon District	
Connected with Geumgang-ro
