= World Cup Bridge =

Bridge in Seoul, South Korea

Coordinates: 37.55608°N 126.88511°E

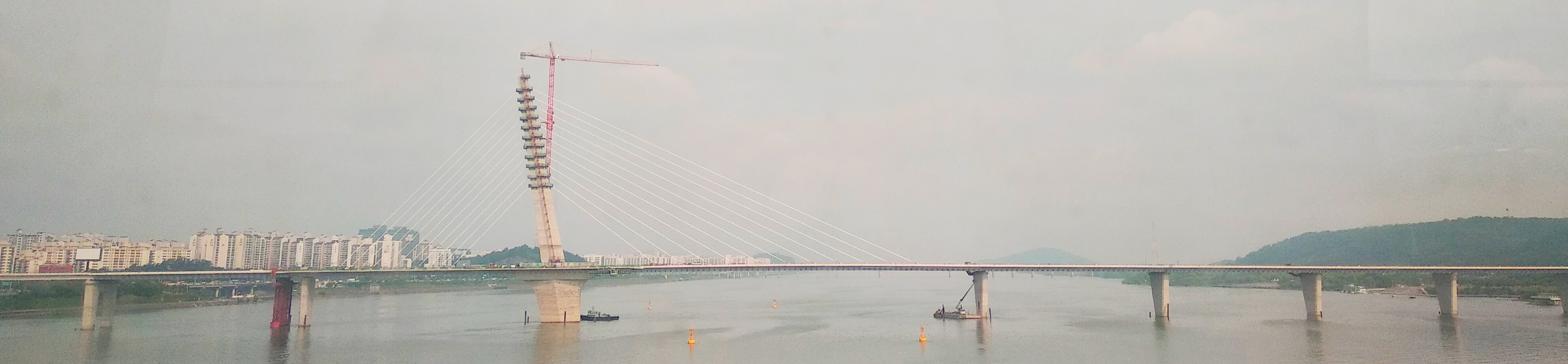
- World Cup Bridge under construction

Korean name
- Hangul: 월드컵대교
- RR: Woldeukeop daegyo
- MR: Wŏldŭk'ŏp taegyo

The World Cup Bridge (Korean: 월드컵대교) is a bridge over the Han River in Seoul, South Korea. It connects Mapo District and Yeongdeungpo District.

Construction on the bridge began in March 2010 and was originally slated to be completed by August 2015, but budget cuts slowed its pace. The main part of the bridge was completed on September 1, 2021. Construction on the bridge fully concluded on December 29, 2023, when two ramps on the southern portion of the bridge were opened for use.

The bridge connects the Seobu Expressway to Mapo District.

The K-pop group BTS performed the song "Butter" on the bridge for the July 14, 2021 airing of The Tonight Show Starring Jimmy Fallon.
