= Seoul City Route 30 (Trunk) =

Road in South Korea

Seoul Special Metropolitan City Route 30
- 서울특별시도 제30호선
- Naegok - Wolgok Line

Route information
- Length: 19.96 km (12.40 mi)

Major junctions
- From: Seocho District, Seoul
- To: Seongbuk District, Seoul

Location
- Country: South Korea

Highway system
- Highway systems of South Korea; Expressways; National; Local

Seoul Metropolitan City Route 30 (Korean: 서울특별시도 제30호선) is a trunk road located in Seoul, South Korea. With a total length of 19.96 km (12.40 mi), this road starts from the Naegok-dong in Seocho District, Seoul to Wolgok-dong in Seongbuk District.

== Stopovers ==
Seoul

- Seocho District - Gangnam District - Seongdong District - Dongdaemun District - Seongbuk District

== List of Facilities ==
IS: Intersection, IC: Interchange

Road name	Name	Hangul name	Connection	Location				Note
Connected with Bundang-Naegok Urban Expressway
Eonju-ro	Naegok Tunnel (Inreungsan)	내곡터널 (인릉산)		Seocho District		Naegok-dong		
Eonju-ro	Naegok IC	내곡나들목	Heolleung-ro	Seocho District		Naegok-dong		
Eonju-ro	Guryong Tunnel (Guryongsan)	구룡터널 (구룡산)		Seocho District		Naegok-dong		
Eonju-ro	Guryong Tunnel (Guryongsan)			Gangnam District		Gaepo 1-dong		
Eonju-ro	Guryong Tunnel IS	구룡터널사거리	Yangjae-daero	Gangnam District		Gaepo 1-dong	Gaepo 4-dong	Gaepo Underpass section
Eonju-ro	Kuryong Elementary School	구룡초교	Gaepo-ro	Gangnam District		Gaepo 1-dong	Gaepo 4-dong	
Eonju-ro	Yeongdong 3 Bridge (Yangjaecheon)	영동3교 (양재천)		Gangnam District		Gaepo 1-dong	Gaepo 4-dong	
Eonju-ro	Yeongdong 3 Bridge (Yangjaecheon)			Gangnam District		Dogok 2-dong		
Eonju-ro	Maebong Tunnel	매봉터널	Nambu Beltway	Gangnam District		Dogok 1-dong	Dogok 2-dong	
Eonju-ro	Maebong Tunnel (Maebongsan)	매봉터널 (매봉산)		Gangnam District		Dogok 1-dong	Dogok 2-dong	
Eonju-ro	Gangnam Severance Hospital IS	강남세브란스사거리	Dogok-ro	Gangnam District		Dogok 1-dong	Dogok 2-dong	
Eonju-ro	Gangnam Severance Hospital IS		Dogok-ro	Gangnam District		Yeoksam 2-dong		
Eonju-ro	Gaenari Apartment IS	개나리아파트사거리	Yeoksam-ro	Gangnam District		Yeoksam 2-dong		
Eonju-ro	Renaissance Hotels	르네상스호텔	Teheran-ro	Gangnam District		Yeoksam 2-dong		
Eonju-ro	Renaissance Hotels		Teheran-ro	Gangnam District		Yeoksam 1-dong		
Eonju-ro	Kyeongbok Apartment	경복아파트	Bongeunsa-ro	Gangnam District		Yeoksam 1-dong		
Eonju-ro	Kyeongbok Apartment		Bongeunsa-ro	Gangnam District		Nonhyeon 2-dong		
Eonju-ro	Seoul Main Customs	서울세관	Hakdong-ro	Gangnam District		Nonhyeon 2-dong		
Eonju-ro			Eonju-ro 140-gil	Gangnam District		Nonhyeon 2-dong		Unnamed
Eonju-ro	Dosan Park IS	도산공원사거리	Dosan-daero	Gangnam District		Nonhyeon 2-dong		
Eonju-ro	Dosan Park IS		Dosan-daero	Gangnam District		Apgujeong-dong		
Eonju-ro	Seongsu Bridge (South)	성수대교남단	Apgujeong-ro	Gangnam District		Apgujeong-dong		
Eonju-ro	Seongsu Bridge (Hangang)	성수대교 (한강)		Gangnam District		Apgujeong-dong		
Gosanja-ro	Seongsu Bridge (Hangang)			Seongdong District		Oksu-dong		
Gosanja-ro	Seongsu Bridge (Hangang)			Seongdong District		Seongsu 1-ga 1-dong		
Gosanja-ro	Seongsu Bridge (North)	성수대교북단	Ttukseom-ro	Seongdong District		Seongsu 1-ga 1-dong		
Gosanja-ro	Eungbong Bridge	응봉교	Gwangnaru-ro	Seongdong District		Seongsu 1-ga 1-dong	Seongsu 1-ga 2-dong	
Gosanja-ro	Eungbong Bridge (Jungnangcheon)	응봉교 (중랑천)		Seongdong District		Seongsu 1-ga 1-dong	Seongsu 1-ga 2-dong	
Gosanja-ro	Eungbong Bridge (Jungnangcheon)			Seongdong District		Eungbong-dong		
Gosanja-ro	Eungbong IS	응봉삼거리	Dokseodang-ro	Seongdong District		Eungbong-dong		
Gosanja-ro	Eungbong IS		Gosanja-ro 4-gil	Seongdong District		Haengdang 1-dong	Haengdang 2-dong	
Gosanja-ro	Muhak Girls' High School	무학여고앞	Haengdang-ro	Seongdong District		Haengdang 1-dong	Haengdang 2-dong	
Gosanja-ro	Muhak Girls' High School		Gosanja-ro 10-gil	Seongdong District		Haengdang 1-dong	Haengdang 2-dong	
Gosanja-ro	Wangsimni Station	왕십리역	Wangsimni-ro; Wangsimnigwangjang-ro	Seongdong District		Haengdang 1-dong	Wangsimnidoseon-dong	Seongdong Underpass section
Gosanja-ro	Doseon IS	도선사거리	Majang-ro	Seongdong District		Haengdang 1-dong	Wangsimnidoseon-dong	
Gosanja-ro	Doseon IS		Majang-ro	Seongdong District		Majang-dong		
Gosanja-ro	Facility Management Corporation	시설관리공단	Cheonggyecheon-ro	Seongdong District		Majang-dong		
Gosanja-ro	Facility Management Corporation		Salgoji-gil	Seongdong District		Majang-dong		
Gosanja-ro	Gosanja Bridge (Cheonggyecheon)	고산자교 (청계천)		Seongdong District		Majang-dong		
Gosanja-ro	Gosanja Bridge (Cheonggyecheon)			Dongdaemun District		Yongsin-dong		
Gosanja-ro	Facility Management Corporation	시설관리공단	Cheonggyecheon-ro	Dongdaemun District		Yongsin-dong		
Gosanja-ro	Dongdaemun-gu Office	동대문구청	Cheonho-daero	Dongdaemun District		Yongsin-dong		
Gosanja-ro	Gyeongdong Market	경동시장	Wangsan-ro	Dongdaemun District		Yongsin-dong		
Gosanja-ro	Gyeongdong Market		Wangsan-ro	Dongdaemun District		Jegi-dong		
Gosanja-ro	Jegi IS	제기사거리	Yangnyeongsi-ro	Dongdaemun District		Jegi-dong		
Gosanja-ro			Gosanja-ro 50-gil	Dongdaemun District		Jegi-dong		Unnamed
Gosanja-ro	Hongpa Elementary School IS	홍파초교사거리	Jegi-ro	Dongdaemun District		Jegi-dong		
Gosanja-ro	2nd Jegi Bridge (Cheongneungcheon)	제2제기교 (정릉천)		Dongdaemun District		Jegi-dong		
Gosanja-ro	Korea University Station IS	고려대역사거리	Anam-ro	Dongdaemun District	Jegi-dong	Seongbuk District	Anam-dong	
Jongam-ro	Korea University Station IS		Anam-ro	Dongdaemun District	Jegi-dong	Seongbuk District	Anam-dong	
Jongam-ro	Korea University Station IS	고려대역사거리	Hoegi-ro	Dongdaemun District	Jegi-dong	Seongbuk District	Anam-dong	
Jongam-ro	Korea University Station IS		Hoegi-ro	Seongbuk District		Jongam-dong	Anam-dong	
Jongam-ro	University High School	사대부고앞	Wolgok-ro	Seongbuk District		Jongam-dong		
Jongam-ro	Jongam IS	종암사거리	Jeongneung-ro	Seongbuk District		Jongam-dong		
Jongam-ro	Jongam IS		Hwarang-ro	Seongbuk District		Gireum 2-dong	Wolgok 1-dong	
Jongam-ro	Mia IS	미아사거리	Dobong-ro	Seongbuk District		Gireum 2-dong	Wolgok 1-dong	
Jongam-ro	Mia IS		Dongsomun-ro	Seongbuk District		Gireum 2-dong	Wolgok 1-dong	
Jongam-ro	Mia IS		Wolgye-ro	Seongbuk District		Gireum 2-dong	Wolgok 1-dong	
Connected with Dobong-ro
