= Highway system in South Korea =

South Korea has seven highway systems.

1. National expressways (Korean: 고속국도; Hanja: 高速國道; RR: Gosokgukdo)
2. General national highways (Korean: 일반국도; Hanja: 一般國道; RR: Ilbangukdo)
3. Special Metropolitan City roads and Metropolitan City roads (Korean: 특별시도·광역시도; Hanja: 特別市道·廣域市道; RR: Teukbyeolsido·Gwangyeoksido)
4. Local highways (Korean: 지방도; Hanja: 地方道; RR: Jibangdo)
5. Si roads (Korean: 시도; Hanja: 市道; RR: Sido)
6. Gun roads (Korean: 군도; Hanja: 郡道; RR: Gundo)
7. Gu roads (Korean: 구도; Hanja: 區道; RR: Gudo)

== National Expressways ==

National Expressways (Korean: 고속국도; Hanja: 高速道路; RR: Gosokgukdo) or Expressways (Korean: 고속도로; Hanja: 高速道路; RR: Gosokdoro)

== General National highways ==
General National highways (Korean: 일반국도; Hanja: 一般國道; RR: Ilbangukdo) or National highways (Korean: 국도; Hanja: 國道; RR: gukdo)

== Special Metropolitan City roads and Metropolitan City roads ==
Special Metropolitan City roads and Metropolitan City roads (Korean: 특별시도·광역시도; Hanja: 特別市道·廣域市道; RR: Teukbyeolsido·Gwangyeoksido)

=== Special Metropolitan City roads ===
Special Metropolitan City roads (Korean: 특별시도; Hanja: 特別市道; RR: Teukbyeolsido) are the highway in the special city (Seoul).

=== Metropolitan City roads ===
Metropolitan City roads (Korean: 광역시도; Hanja: 廣域市道; RR: Gwangyeoksido) are the highway in the metropolitan city.

- Metropolitan City roads of Busan
- Metropolitan City roads of Daegu
- Metropolitan City roads of Incheon
- Metropolitan City roads of Gwangju
- Metropolitan City roads of Daejeon
- Metropolitan City roads of Ulsan

== Local highways ==
Local highways (Korean: 지방도; Hanja: 地方道; RR: Jibangdo)

=== State-funded local highways ===
State-funded local highways (Korean: 국가지원지방도; Hanja: 國家支援地方道; RR: Gukgajiwonjibangdo, shortly Korean: 국지도; Hanja: 國支道; RR: Gukjido)

=== General local highways ===

General local highways (Korean: 일반지방도; Hanja: 一般地方道; RR: Ilbanjibangdo

== Si roads ==
Si roads (Korean: 시도; Hanja: 市道; RR: Sido) are the highways in the cities (Si).

== Gun roads ==
Gun roads (Korean: 군도; Hanja: 郡道; RR: Gundo) are the highways in the counties (Gun).

== Gu roads ==
Gu roads (Korean: 구도; Hanja: 區道; RR: Gudo) are the highways in the districts (Gu).
