= Seoul City Route 31 =

Road in South Korea

Seoul Special Metropolitan City Route 31
- 서울특별시도 제31호선

Route information
- Length: 17 km (11 mi)

Major junctions
- From: Seocho District, Seoul
- To: Jongno District, Seoul

Location
- Country: South Korea

Highway system
- Highway systems of South Korea; Expressways; National; Local

Seoul Metropolitan City Route 31 (Korean: 서울특별시도 제31호선) is an urban road located in Seoul, South Korea. With a total length of 17 km (11 mi), this road starts from the Juam 2 Bridge in Seocho District, Seoul to Sejong-daero Intersection in Jongno District.

== Stopovers ==
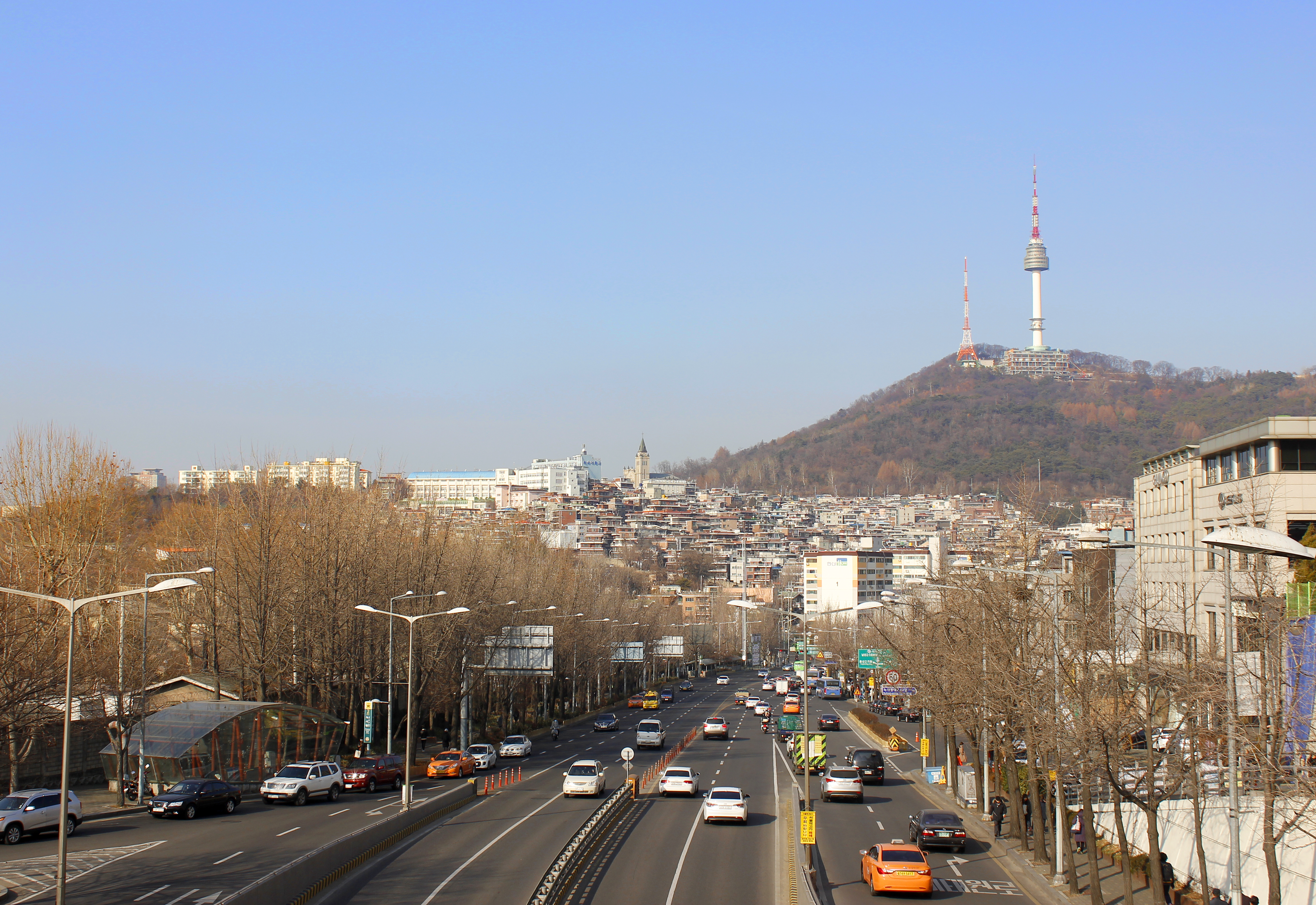
Noksapyeong-daero.

Seoul

- Seocho District - Yongsan District - Jung District - Jongno District

== List of Facilities ==
IS: Intersection, IC: Interchange

Road name	Name	Hangul name	Connection	Location		Note
Connected with Local Route 309 (Umyeonsan-ro)
Umyeonsan-ro	Juam 2 Bridge	주암2교		Seoul	Seocho District	Boundary
Umyeonsan-ro	Seonam IC	선암 나들목	National Route 47 (Jungang-ro, Yangjae-daero)	Seoul	Seocho District	
Umyeonsan-ro	Omyeonsan Tunnel Tollgate	우면산터널 요금소		Seoul	Seocho District	
Umyeonsan-ro	Umyeonsan Tunnel	우면산터널		Seoul	Seocho District	Total length: 2070m
Umyeonsan-ro	Seoul Arts Center IS	예술의전당 교차로	Seoul City Route 92 (Nambu Beltway)	Seoul	Seocho District	
Banpo-daero	Seoul Arts Center IS		Seoul City Route 92 (Nambu Beltway)	Seoul	Seocho District	
Banpo-daero	Seocho 3-dong IS	서초3동사거리	Hyoryeong-ro	Seoul	Seocho District	
Banpo-daero	University of Education Entrance IS	교대입구 교차로	Saimdang-ro	Seoul	Seocho District	
Banpo-daero	Seocho Station IS	서초역 교차로	Seoul City Route 90 (Seocho-daero)	Seoul	Seocho District	
Banpo-daero	Supreme Court Seoul Central District Prosecutor's Office	대법원 서울중앙지방검찰청		Seoul	Seocho District	
Banpo-daero	Seoul St. Mary's Hospital IS	서울성모병원 교차로	Sapyeong-daero	Seoul	Seocho District	
Banpo-daero	Seoul Express Bus Terminal IS (Banpo-dong IS)	고속터미널 교차로 (반포동 교차로)	Sinbanpo-ro	Seoul	Seocho District	Gangnam Terminal Overpass section
Banpo-daero	Banpo Br. IC (South)	반포대교남단 나들목	Olympic-daero	Seoul	Seocho District	
Banpo-daero	Banpo Bridge Jamsu Bridge	반포대교 잠수교		Seoul	Seocho District	
Banpo-daero	Banpo Bridge Jamsu Bridge			Seoul	Yongsan District	
Banpo-daero	Banpo Br. IC (North)	반포대교북단 나들목	Gangbyeonbuk-ro; National Route 46 (Gangbyeonbuk-ro); Local Route 23 (Gangbyeonbuk-ro); Seobinggo-ro	Seoul	Yongsan District	
Noksapyeong-daero	Banpo Br. IC (North)		Gangbyeonbuk-ro; National Route 46 (Gangbyeonbuk-ro); Local Route 23 (Gangbyeonbuk-ro); Seobinggo-ro	Seoul	Yongsan District	
Noksapyeong-daero	(Banpo Br. IS)	(반포대교북단 교차로)	Seobinggo-ro	Seoul	Yongsan District	
Noksapyeong-daero	Hangang Middle School IS	한강중교앞 교차로	Seobinggo-ro 51-gil	Seoul	Yongsan District	
Noksapyeong-daero	Yongsan District Office	용산구청		Seoul	Yongsan District	
Noksapyeong-daero	Noksapyeong Station IS	녹사평역 교차로	Itaewon-ro	Seoul	Yongsan District	Itaewon Underpass section
Noksapyeong-daero	Service Support Corps IS	재정관리단앞 교차로	Hoenamu-ro; Sinheung-ro	Seoul	Yongsan District	
Noksapyeong-daero	No name	(이름 없음)	Noksapyeong-daero 58-gil (Namsan 2nd Tunnel)	Seoul	Yongsan District	
Noksapyeong-daero	Namsan 3rd Tunnel	남산3호터널		Seoul	Yongsan District	Total length: 1270m
Noksapyeong-daero	Namsan 3rd Tunnel			Seoul	Jung District	Total length: 1270m
Sogong-ro	Namsan 3rd Tunnel Tollgate	남산3호터널 요금소		Seoul	Jung District	
Sogong-ro	Hoehyeon IS	회현사거리	Toegye-ro	Seoul	Jung District	
Sogong-ro	Bank of Korea IS	한국은행앞 교차로	Namdaemun-ro	Seoul	Jung District	
Sogong-ro	City Hall IS (Seoul City Hall, Seoul Square)	시청 교차로 (서울특별시청, 서울광장)	Seoul City Route 60 (Eulji-ro)	Seoul	Jung District	Seoul City Route 60 overlap One-way
Sogong-ro	City Hall IS (Seoul Square, Daehanmun, City Hall Station	시청 교차로 (서울광장, 대한문, 시청역)	Seoul City Route 60 (Sejong-daero)	Seoul	Jung District	Seoul City Route 60 overlap One-way
Sejong-daero	City Hall IS (Seoul Square, Daehanmun, City Hall Station		Seoul City Route 60 (Sejong-daero)	Seoul	Jung District	Seoul City Route 60 overlap One-way
Sejong-daero	No name	(이름 없음)	Sejong-daero 20-gil	Seoul	Jung District	
Sejong-daero	Cheonggye Square IS	청계광장 교차로	Cheonggyecheon-ro	Seoul	Jung District	
Sejong-daero	Sejong-daero IS	세종대로사거리	National Route 6 (Saemunan-ro, Jongno)	Seoul	Jongno District	
Connected with National Route 48 (Sejong-daero)
