= Local Route 23 (South Korea) =

Road in South Korea

State-Funded Local Highway 23
- 국가지원지방도 제23호선
- Cheonan-Seoul Line 천안 ~ 서울선

Route information
- Length: 105 km (65 mi)
- Existed: 19 July 1996–present

Major junctions
- South end: Anseo-dong, Cheonan, South Chungcheong
- North end: Hapjeong-dong, Mapo District, Seoul

Location
- Country: South Korea
- Major cities: Cheonan, Anseong, Yongin, Hwaseong, Seongnam, Seoul

Highway system
- Highway systems of South Korea; Expressways; National; Local

Local Route 23 Cheonan–Seoul Line (Korean: 국가지원지방도 제23호선 천안 ~ 서울선) is a local route of South Korea that connecting, Cheonan, South Chungcheong Province to Mapo District, Seoul.

== History ==
The route was originally planned as part of an extension of National Route 23 from Cheonan to Munsan, but due to a lack of funding, the route was never upgraded and was designated as a state-funded local route on 19 July 1996 running from Cheonan to Paju, replacing Local Route 315. On 17 November 2008, the section from Seoul to Paju was upgraded to National Route 77, shortening Route 23 to its current configuration.

== Stopovers ==
South Chungcheong Province

- Cheonan

Gyeonggi Province

- Anseong

South Chungcheong Province

- Cheonan

Gyeonggi Province

- Anseong - Yongin - Hwaseong - Yongin - Seongnam

Seoul

- Gangnam District - Gwangjin District - Seongdong District - Yongsan District - Mapo District

== Major intersections ==
- (■): Motorway

IS: Intersection, IC: Interchange

=== South Chungcheong Province ===
Name	Hangul name	Connection	Location		Note
Connected with National Route 23
Cheonan IC	천안 나들목	Gyeongbu Expressway; National Route 1 (Samseong-daero); National Route 23 (Mannam-ro)	Cheonan City	Dongnam District	Terminus
Cheonhoji IS	천호지삼거리		Cheonan City	Dongnam District	
Anseo-dong IS	안서동삼거리	Gagwonsa-gil	Cheonan City	Dongnam District	
Sangmyung University IS	상명대삼거리	Sangmyeongdae-gil	Cheonan City	Dongnam District	
Baekseok University IS	백석대삼거리	Munam-ro	Cheonan City	Dongnam District	
Dankook University Cheonan Campus	단국대학교 천안캠퍼스		Cheonan City	Dongnam District	
Seokmun IS	석문 교차로	Seongmun-gil	Cheonan City	Seobuk District Seonggeo-eup	
Manghyang National Cemetery	망향의동산 교차로		Cheonan City	Seobuk District Seonggeo-eup	
Seokgyo IS	석교 교차로	Doldari-gil; Seokgyo 2-gil	Cheonan City	Seobuk District Seonggeo-eup	
Songnam IS	송남 교차로	Seonggeo-gil	Cheonan City	Seobuk District Seonggeo-eup	
Jeori IS	저리 교차로	Bongju-ro; Sucheong 2-gil	Cheonan City	Seobuk District Seonggeo-eup	
Sucheong IS	수청 교차로	Mosiul 1-gil Sucheong 1-gil	Cheonan City	Seobuk District Seonggeo-eup	
Jeori 1 Bridge	저리1교		Cheonan City	Seobuk District Seonggeo-eup	
Omok IS	오목 교차로	Seonggeo-gil	Cheonan City	Seobuk District Seonggeo-eup	
Surigogae	수리고개		Cheonan City	Seobuk District Seonggeo-eup	
Surigogae			Cheonan City	Seobuk District Ipjang-myeon	
Sijang IS	시장 교차로	Ipjang-ro	Cheonan City	Seobuk District Ipjang-myeon	
Wirye IS	위례 교차로	Sindeok 4-gil Wiryesan-gil	Cheonan City	Seobuk District Ipjang-myeon	
Sijang Bridge	시장교		Cheonan City	Seobuk District Ipjang-myeon	
Hongcheon IS	홍천 교차로	Seokjae-gil; Hongcheon-gil	Cheonan City	Seobuk District Ipjang-myeon	
Sangjang IS	상장 교차로	Seongjin-ro	Cheonan City	Seobuk District Ipjang-myeon	
Sangjang Bridge	상장교		Cheonan City	Seobuk District Ipjang-myeon	
Ipjang IS	입장 교차로	National Route 34 (Samsa-ro)	Cheonan City	Seobuk District Ipjang-myeon	Continuation into Gyeonggi Province

=== Gyeonggi Province ===
Name	Hangul name	Connection	Location		Note
Ipjang IS	입장 교차로	National Route 34 (Seonghwan Detour Road)	Anseong City	Seoun-myeon	South Chungcheong Province - Gyeonggi Province border line
Songsan Bridge	송산교		Anseong City	Seoun-myeon	
Songsan IS	송산 교차로	Solmoe-ro	Anseong City	Seoun-myeon	
Dongchon Bridge	동촌교		Anseong City	Seoun-myeon	
Dongchon Bridge			Anseong City	Miyang-myeon	
Yangbyeon IS	양변 교차로	Anseongmatchum-daero	Anseong City	Miyang-myeon	
Moraegogae	모래고개		Anseong City	Miyang-myeon	
(Unnamed bridge)	(교량 명칭 미상)		Anseong City	Miyang-myeon	
South Anseong IC (Neukdong IS) (Underpass)	남안성 나들목 (늑동 교차로) (지하차도)	Pyeongtaek-Jecheon Expressway; Je2gongdan 1-gil	Anseong City	Miyang-myeon	
Gurye Bridge	구례교		Anseong City	Miyang-myeon	
Singi IS	신기 교차로	70 Prefectural Route 70 (Miyang-ro)	Anseong City	Miyang-myeon	
Singi Bridge	신기교		Anseong City	Miyang-myeon	
Geonji IS	건지 교차로	Jungang-ro	Anseong City	Daedeok-myeon	
(Unnamed bridge)	(교량 명칭 미상)		Anseong City	Daedeok-myeon	
Mosan IS	모산 교차로	70 Prefectural Route 70 (Manse-ro) (Anseong-daero)	Anseong City	Daedeok-myeon	
Sinryeong-ri Entrance	신령리입구	Sillyeong-ro	Anseong City	Daedeok-myeon	
Sonae Bridge	소내교		Anseong City	Daedeok-myeon	
Myeongdang Bridge	명당교		Anseong City	Daedeok-myeon	
Myeongdang Bridge			Anseong City	Yangseong-myeon	
Gujang Bridge	구장교		Anseong City	Yangseong-myeon	
Donghang IS	동항사거리	306 Prefectural Route 306 (Yangseong-ro); Jangteo-gil	Anseong City	Yangseong-myeon	Prefectural Route 306 overlap
Yangseong IS	양성사거리	321 Prefectural Route 321 (Deokbongseowon-ro)	Anseong City	Yangseong-myeon	Prefectural Route 306, Prefectural Route 321 overlap
No name	(이름 없음)	Jangteo-gil	Anseong City	Yangseong-myeon	Prefectural Route 306, Prefectural Route 321 overlap
Mansegogae (Anseong 3.1 Movement Memorial)	만세고개 (안성3.1운동기념관)	Manse-ro	Anseong City	Yangseong-myeon	Prefectural Route 306, Prefectural Route 321 overlap
Seongeun IS	성은삼거리	306 Prefectural Route 306 (Jimun-ro)	Anseong City	Wongok-myeon	Prefectural Route 306, Prefectural Route 321 overlap
Sanjik Bridge	산직교		Anseong City	Wongok-myeon	Prefectural Route 321 overlap
Sanjik Bridge			Yongin City	Cheoin District Namsa-myeon	Prefectural Route 321 overlap
Sinchon Bridge	신촌교		Yongin City	Cheoin District Namsa-myeon	Prefectural Route 321 overlap
Front of Namchon Elementary School IS	남촌초교앞삼거리	Manchon-ro	Yongin City	Cheoin District Namsa-myeon	Prefectural Route 321 overlap
Namchon Elementary School	남촌초등학교		Yongin City	Cheoin District Namsa-myeon	Prefectural Route 321 overlap
Jinmok IS	진목 교차로	314 Prefectural Route 314 (Eojin-ro)	Yongin City	Cheoin District Namsa-myeon	Prefectural Route 321 overlap
Jinmok Bridge	진목교		Yongin City	Cheoin District Namsa-myeon	Prefectural Route 321 overlap
Bongmyeong IS	봉명삼거리	321 Prefectural Route 321 (Cheoinseong-ro)	Yongin City	Cheoin District Namsa-myeon	Prefectural Route 321 overlap
Yupyeong 1 Bridge	유평1교		Yongin City	Cheoin District Namsa-myeon	
Yupyeong 2 IS	유평2 교차로	Tongsam-ro	Yongin City	Cheoin District Namsa-myeon	Prefectural Route 310 overlap
Yupyeong 1 IS (Namsa IC)	유평1 교차로 (남사 나들목)	Gyeongbu Expressway; 310 Prefectural Route 310 (Cheondeoksan-ro)	Yongin City	Cheoin District Namsa-myeon	Prefectural Route 310 overlap
Dongmak IS	동막 교차로	Seochon-ro	Yongin City	Cheoin District Namsa-myeon	
Jangji IS	장지 교차로	82 Prefectural Route 82 (Gyeonggidong-ro)	Hwaseong City	Dongtan-dong	
Sancheok Underpass	산척지히차도		Hwaseong City	Dongtan-dong	
Sinri IS (Sinri Underpass)	신리 교차로 (신리지하차도)	Dongtansancheok-ro	Hwaseong City	Dongtan-dong	
Sinri Bridge	신리교		Hwaseong City	Dongtan-dong	
Jungri Tunnel	중리터널		Hwaseong City	Dongtan-dong	Right tunnel: Approximately 650m Left tunnel: Approximately 600m
Mubong Bridge	무봉교		Hwaseong City	Dongtan-dong	
Jungri IS	중리 교차로	84 Prefectural Route 84 (Dongtanchidongcheon-ro)	Hwaseong City	Dongtan-dong	
Gomae 1 Bridge	고매1교		Hwaseong City	Dongtan-dong	
Gomae 1 Bridge			Yongin City	Giheung District	
(Unnamed tunnel)	(터널 명칭 미상)		Yongin City	Giheung District	Right tunnel: Approximately 730m Left tunnel: Approximately 745m
Gomae 2 Bridge	고매2교		Yongin City	Giheung District	
Gomae IS	고매 교차로	Gomae-ro	Yongin City	Giheung District	
Gongse 1 Bridge	공세1교		Yongin City	Giheung District	
Gyeongin Gas Station IS	경인주유소앞 삼거리	Tapsil-ro	Yongin City	Giheung District	
Gongse 2 Bridge	공세2교		Yongin City	Giheung District	
Hanbora Village Entrance	한보라마을입구	317 Prefectural Route 317 (Dongtangiheung-ro); Hanbora 2-ro	Yongin City	Giheung District	
Bora Pedestrian Bridge IS	보라횡단교삼거리	315 Prefectural Route 315 (Borahagal-ro)	Yongin City	Giheung District	Prefectural Route 315 overlap
Borajigu Entrance IS	보라지구입구삼거리	Hanbora 1-ro 64beon-gil	Yongin City	Giheung District	Prefectural Route 315 overlap
Bora Bridge	보라교		Yongin City	Giheung District	Prefectural Route 315 overlap
Bora Bridge IS	보라교사거리	315 Prefectural Route 315 (Saeun-ro); Yonggu-daero 1855beon-gil	Yongin City	Giheung District	Prefectural Route 315 overlap
Korean Folk Village	민속촌입구	Minsokchon-ro	Yongin City	Giheung District	
Tongmi Village IS	통미마을삼거리	Yonggu-daero 1855beon-gil	Yongin City	Giheung District	
Amorepacific IS	아모레퍼시픽삼거리		Yongin City	Giheung District	
Geumhwa Village Entrance IS	금화마을입구삼거리	Geumhwa-ro	Yongin City	Giheung District	
Bora Elementary School IS	보라초등학교앞삼거리	Geumhwa-ro 105beon-gil	Yongin City	Giheung District	
Sanggal IS	상갈 교차로	Geumhwa-ro; Singal-ro	Yongin City	Giheung District	
Sanggal Bridge IS	상갈교사거리	Galcheon-ro	Yongin City	Giheung District	
Sanggal Bridge	상갈교		Yongin City	Giheung District	
Singal IS	신갈오거리	National Route 42; 98 Prefectural Route 98 (Jungbu-daero); Singal-ro 58beon-gil	Yongin City	Giheung District	
Shingal Elementary School	신갈초등학교	Singal-ro 57beon-gil Singal-ro 84beon-gil	Yongin City	Giheung District	
Samik Apartment IS	삼익아파트사거리	Singal-ro 89beon-gil Singal-ro 124beon-gil	Yongin City	Giheung District	
Samsung Guseong Overpass	삼성구성고가차도	Yonggu-daero; Yonggu-daero 2152beon-gil	Yongin City	Giheung District	
Shinan Apartment IS	신안아파트사거리	Gwangok-ro; Heungdeok 4-ro	Yongin City	Giheung District	
Punglim Apartment IS Hyundai Apartment IS	풍림아파트삼거리 현대아파트삼거리		Yongin City	Giheung District	
Yongin Driver's License Test Center	용인운전면허시험장	Giheung-ro	Yongin City	Giheung District	
Suwon Land Office IS Gyeonggi Women's Development Center	수원국토삼거리 경기도여성능력개발센터		Yongin City	Giheung District	
Guseong IS	구성사거리	Seokseong-ro	Yongin City	Giheung District	
Samgeo Bridge	삼거교		Yongin City	Giheung District	
Mabuk IS	마북삼거리	Guseong-ro	Yongin City	Giheung District	
Yeonwon Village IS	연원마을삼거리	Yeonwon-ro	Yongin City	Giheung District	
Green Gas Station IS Keumho Bestvill Guseong E-mart Traders	그린주유소앞삼거리 금호베스트빌삼거리 이마트트레이더스 구성점		Yongin City	Giheung District	
Guseong E-mart IS	구성이마트삼거리	Guggyodong-ro	Yongin City	Giheung District	
Bojeong IS	보정 교차로	Yonggu-daero 2469beon-gil	Yongin City	Giheung District	
Bojeong Bridge	보정교		Yongin City	Giheung District	
Sinchon Village IS (Donga Overpass)	신촌마을앞삼거리 (동아고가교)	Yonggu-daero 2518beon-gil	Yongin City	Giheung District	
Bojeong Station	보정역		Yongin City	Giheung District	
Jukhyeon IS	죽현 교차로	Jukjeon-ro	Yongin City	Giheung District	
Dokjeong Bridge	독정교		Yongin City	Giheung District	
Jukjeon IS (Jukjeon Overpass)	죽전사거리 (죽전고가차도)	National Route 43 (Poeun-daero); Yonggu-daero	Yongin City	Suji District	National Route 43 overlap
Jukjeon Station (Gyeonggi Shinsegae) Jukjeon 2-dong Community Center Yongin Arpia Sports Park	죽전역 (신세계백화점 경기점) 죽전2동행정복지센터 용인아르피아체육공원		Yongin City	Suji District	National Route 43 overlap
Pungdeokcheon IS	풍덕천삼거리	Bundang-Suseo Urban Expressway; Yonggu-daero 2469beon-gil	Yongin City	Suji District	National Route 43 overlap
Pungdeokcheon IS (Pungdeok Overpass)	풍덕천사거리 (풍덕고가차도)	National Route 43 (Poeun-daero); Sinsu-ro	Yongin City	Suji District	National Route 43 overlap
Pungdeokcheon Pedestrian Overpass	풍덕천보도육교	Pungdeokcheon-ro	Yongin City	Suji District	
Family Gas Station IS	훼미리주유소삼거리	Sinsu-ro 683beon-gil	Yongin City	Suji District	
KT Corporation Suji Branch Office IS	KT수지지사앞삼거리	Munin-ro	Yongin City	Suji District	
No name	(이름 없음)	Songok-ro	Yongin City	Suji District	
Mandang Gas Station IS	만당주유소앞삼거리	Suji-ro	Yongin City	Suji District	
Meonae Industrial Bank of Korea	머내기업은행		Yongin City	Suji District	
Meonae Overpass	머내고가교		Yongin City	Suji District	
Meonae Overpass			Seongnam City	Bundang District	
Geumgok IC	금곡 나들목	334 Prefectural Route 334 (Dongmak-ro); Dolma-ro	Seongnam City	Bundang District	
Bo Bath Memorial Hospital	보바스기념병원		Seongnam City	Bundang District	
Seongnam Foreign Language High School Entrance	성남외고입구	Daewangpangyo-ro 385beon-gil	Seongnam City	Bundang District	
Baekhyeon Overpass	백현고가교	Baekhyeon-ro; 57 Prefectural Route 57 (Anyangpangyo-ro)	Seongnam City	Bundang District	Prefectural Route 57 overlap
Naksaeng High School	낙생고등학교		Seongnam City	Bundang District	Prefectural Route 57 overlap
Nakwon Bridge	낙원교		Seongnam City	Bundang District	Prefectural Route 57 overlap
No name	(이름 없음)	Unjung-ro	Seongnam City	Bundang District	Prefectural Route 57 overlap
Nakwon Underpass	낙원지하차도		Seongnam City	Bundang District	Prefectural Route 57 overlap
Pangyo IC	판교 나들목	Gyeongbu Expressway; Seoul Ring Expressway; 57 Prefectural Route 57 (Seohyeon-ro)	Seongnam City	Bundang District	Prefectural Route 57 overlap Hwarang Underpass
Hwarang Bridge	화랑교		Seongnam City	Bundang District	Hwarang Underpass
Hwarang Park IS	화랑공원삼거리	Daewangpangyo-ro 606beon-gil	Seongnam City	Bundang District	Hwarang Underpass
Ssangryong Bridge	쌍룡교		Seongnam City	Bundang District	Hwarang Underpass
Pangyo Techno Jungang IS	판교테크노중앙사거리	Pangyo-ro	Seongnam City	Bundang District	Hwarang Underpass
Geumto-dong IS	금토동삼거리	Dallaenae-ro	Seongnam City	Sujeong District	
Korea Expressway Corporation Sejong Institute IS	한국도로공사 세종연구소앞 교차로		Seongnam City	Sujeong District	
Siheung IS	시흥사거리	Bundang-Naegok Urban Expressway; Yeosu-daero	Seongnam City	Sujeong District	
Godeung-dong Community Center Godeung Bridge	고등동행정복지센터 고등교		Seongnam City	Sujeong District	
(Cheonggye-ro Entrance)	(청계로입구)	Cheonggyesan-ro	Seongnam City	Sujeong District	Indirect connects with Godeung IC
Seoul Air Base Entrance IS	서울공항정문사거리	Simgok-ro	Seongnam City	Sujeong District	
Hyosung High School	효성고등학교		Seongnam City	Sujeong District	
Segok 3 Bridge	세곡3교		Seongnam City	Sujeong District	Continuation into Seoul

=== Seoul ===
Name	Hangul name	Connection	Location		Note
Segok 3 Bridge	세곡3교		Seoul	Gangnam District	Gyeonggi Province - Seoul border line
Segok-dong IS	세곡동사거리	Heolleung-ro	Seoul	Gangnam District	
Segok-dong Community Center	세곡동행정복지센터		Seoul	Gangnam District	
Motgol Village	못골마을	Jagok-ro	Seoul	Gangnam District	
Suseo Station IS (Suseo station)	수서역 교차로 (수서역)	Gwangpyeong-ro	Seoul	Gangnam District	
Suseo IC	수서 나들목	Dongbu Expressway; Nambu Beltway; Yangjae-daero	Seoul	Gangnam District	
Irwon 1-dong Community Center	일원1동행정복지센터	Yangjae-daero 55-gil	Seoul	Gangnam District	
Samsung Seoul Hospital IS	삼성서울병원사거리	Irwon-ro	Seoul	Gangnam District	
Irwon Tunnel IS (Irwon Underpass)	일원터널 교차로 (일원지하차도)	National Route 47 (Yangjae-daero); Gwangpyeong-ro	Seoul	Gangnam District	National Route 47 overlap
Official pension shop	공무원연금매점	Yeongdong-daero 3-gil Yeongdong-daero 4-gil	Seoul	Gangnam District	National Route 47 overlap
Daemosan Station (Gaewon Middle School)	대모산입구역 (개원중학교)	Gaepo-ro	Seoul	Gangnam District	National Route 47 overlap
Yeongdong 6 Bridge	영동6교		Seoul	Gangnam District	National Route 47 overlap
Hangnyeoul Station (Seoul Trade Exhibition Center, SETEC)	학여울역 (서울무역전시컨벤션센터)	Nambu Beltway	Seoul	Gangnam District	National Route 47 overlap
Daechi Useong Apartment	대치우성아파트	Dogok-ro	Seoul	Gangnam District	National Route 47 overlap
Ottogi	오뚜기		Seoul	Gangnam District	National Route 47 overlap
Samseong Station	삼성역	Teheran-ro	Seoul	Gangnam District	National Route 47 overlap
COEX World Trade Center Seoul (Trade Tower) Korea Electric Power Corporation	코엑스 한국종합무역센터 (트레이드 타워) 한국전력공사		Seoul	Gangnam District	National Route 47 overlap
COEX IS	코엑스 교차로	Bongeunsa-ro	Seoul	Gangnam District	National Route 47 overlap
Kyunggi High School (Cheongdam Station)	경기고등학교앞 (청담역)	Hakdong-ro	Seoul	Gangnam District	National Route 47 overlap
South of Yeongdong Bridge	영동대교 남단	Dosan-daero; Olympic-daero	Seoul	Gangnam District	National Route 47 overlap
Yeongdong Bridge	영동대교		Seoul	Gangnam District	National Route 47 overlap
Yeongdong Bridge			Seoul	Gwangjin District	National Route 47 overlap
North Yeongdong Bridge IC	영동대교북단 나들목	Gangbyeonbuk-ro (National Route 46); National Route 47 (Dongil-ro)	Seoul	Gwangjin District	National Route 47 and National Route 46 overlap
No name	(이름 없음)	Wangsimni-ro	Seoul	Seongdong District	National Route 46 overlap
Seongsu Bridge IC	성수대교북단 나들목	Gosanja-ro; Eonju-ro	Seoul	Seongdong District	National Route 46 overlap
Dongbu Expressway Entrance	동부간선도로 입구	Dongbu Expressway	Seoul	Seongdong District	National Route 46 overlap
Hannam Bridge IC	한남대교북단 나들목	Hannam-daero	Seoul	Yongsan District	National Route 46 overlap
No name	(이름 없음)	Seobinggo-ro	Seoul	Yongsan District	National Route 46 overlap
Banpo Bridge IC	반포대교북단 나들목	Banpo-daero; Noksapyeong-daero	Seoul	Yongsan District	National Route 46 overlap
Shindonga Apartment	신동아아파트	Ichon-ro	Seoul	Yongsan District	National Route 46 overlap
Dongjak Bridge IC	동작대교북단 나들목	Dongjak-daero	Seoul	Yongsan District	National Route 46 overlap
Hangang Bridge IC	한강대교북단 나들목	Hangang-daero; Ichon-ro	Seoul	Yongsan District	National Route 46 overlap
Wonhyo Bridge IC	원효대교북단 나들목	Yeouidaebang-ro; Cheongpa-ro	Seoul	Yongsan District	National Route 46 overlap
No name	(이름 없음)	Wonhyo-ro	Seoul	Mapo District	National Route 46 overlap
Mapo Bridge IC	마포대교북단 나들목	National Route 46 (Yeoui-daero); Mapo-daero	Seoul	Mapo District	National Route 46 overlap
No name	(이름 없음)	Daeheung-ro	Seoul	Mapo District	
Seogang Bridge IC	서강대교북단 나들목	Gukhoe-daero; Seogang-ro	Seoul	Mapo District	
No name	(이름 없음)	Wausan-ro	Seoul	Mapo District	
Yanghwa Bridge IC	양화대교북단 나들목	National Route 6 National Route 77 (Seonyu-ro) (Yanghwa-ro)	Seoul	Mapo District	National Route 77 overlap
No name	(이름 없음)	Donggyo-ro	Seoul	Mapo District	National Route 77 overlap
Seongsan Bridge IC	성산대교북단 나들목	National Route 1 National Route 48 (Seobu Expressway) (Seongsan-ro); Naebu Expressway	Seoul	Mapo District	National Route 77 overlap
Nanji Park IS	난지공원 교차로	Jeungsan-ro	Seoul	Mapo District	National Route 77 overlap
Noeul Park IS	노을공원 교차로	Haneulgongwon-ro	Seoul	Mapo District	National Route 77 overlap
Gayang Bridge IS	가양대교북단 교차로	Gayang-daero; Hwagok-ro	Seoul	Mapo District	National Route 77 overlap Terminus
Connected with National Route 77 (Jayu-ro)

== See also ==
- Roads and expressways in South Korea
- Transportation in South Korea
