= Umyeonsan-ro =

Korean road

- 우면산로

Route information
- Length: 6.3 km (3.9 mi)
- Existed: 6 January 2004–present

Major junctions
- From: Gwacheon, Gyeonggi Province
- To: Seocho District, Seoul

Location
- Country: South Korea

Highway system
- Seoul City Route 31; Local Route 309

Umyeonsan-ro (Korean: 우면산로) is a road in Gyeonggi Province and Seoul, South Korea. With a total length of 6.3 km (3.9 mi), this road starts from the Sangabeol Underpass in Gwacheon, Gyeonggi to Umyeonsan Tunnel in Seocho District.

== Stopovers ==
Gyeonggi Province

- Gwacheon

Seoul

- Seocho District

== List of Facilities ==
- Notes
  - IC : Interchange (나들목)
  - IS : Intersection (평면 교차로)
  - TG : Tollgate (요금소)
  - BR : Bridge (교량)
  - TN : Tunnel (터널)
- Light purple(■): Local Route 309 section
- Light pink(■): Seoul City Route 31 section

Type	Name	Hangul name	Connection	Location		Note
Connected with National Route 47 and Local Route 309 (Gwacheon-daero)
IC	Daegongwon Entrance	대공원입구	National Route 47 (Gwacheon-daero); Daegongwon-daero	Gyeonggi Province	Gwacheon	Sangabeol Underpass section
IC	Gyeongma	경마	Gyeongmagongwon-daero	Gyeonggi Province	Gwacheon	
BR	Juam 2 Bridge	주암2교		Gyeonggi Province	Gwacheon	
BR	Juam 2 Bridge	주암2교		Seoul	Seocho District	
IC	Seonam	선암	National Route 47 (Jungang-ro, Yangjae-daero); Taebong-ro	Seoul	Seocho District	
TG	Umyeonsan Tunnel Tollgate	우면산터널 요금소		Seoul	Seocho District	
TN	Umyeonsan Tunnel	우면산터널		Seoul	Seocho District	Length: 2070m
~~IS~~	~~Seoul Arts Center IS~~	~~예술의전당 교차로~~	~~Seoul City Route 92~~; ~~(Nambu Beltway)~~	Seoul	Seocho District	Under crossing
IC	(Terminus)	(종점)	Seoul City Route 31 (Banpo-daero)	Seoul	Seocho District	Directly connected
Connected with Seoul City Route 31 (Banpo-daero)
