= Yangjae-daero =

Road in South Korea

- 양재대로

Route information
- Length: 19.36 km (12.03 mi)
- Existed: 12 July 1988–present

Major junctions
- From: Seocho District, Seoul
- To: Guri, Gyeonggi Province

Location
- Country: South Korea

Highway system
- National Route 47; Seoul City Route 31; Local Route 23

Yangjae-daero (Korean: 양재대로) is a road located in Gyeonggi Province and Seoul, South Korea. With a total length of 19.36 km (12.03 mi), this road starts from the Seonam Interchange in Seocho District, Seoul to Acheon Interchange in Guri, Gyeonggi.

== Stopovers ==
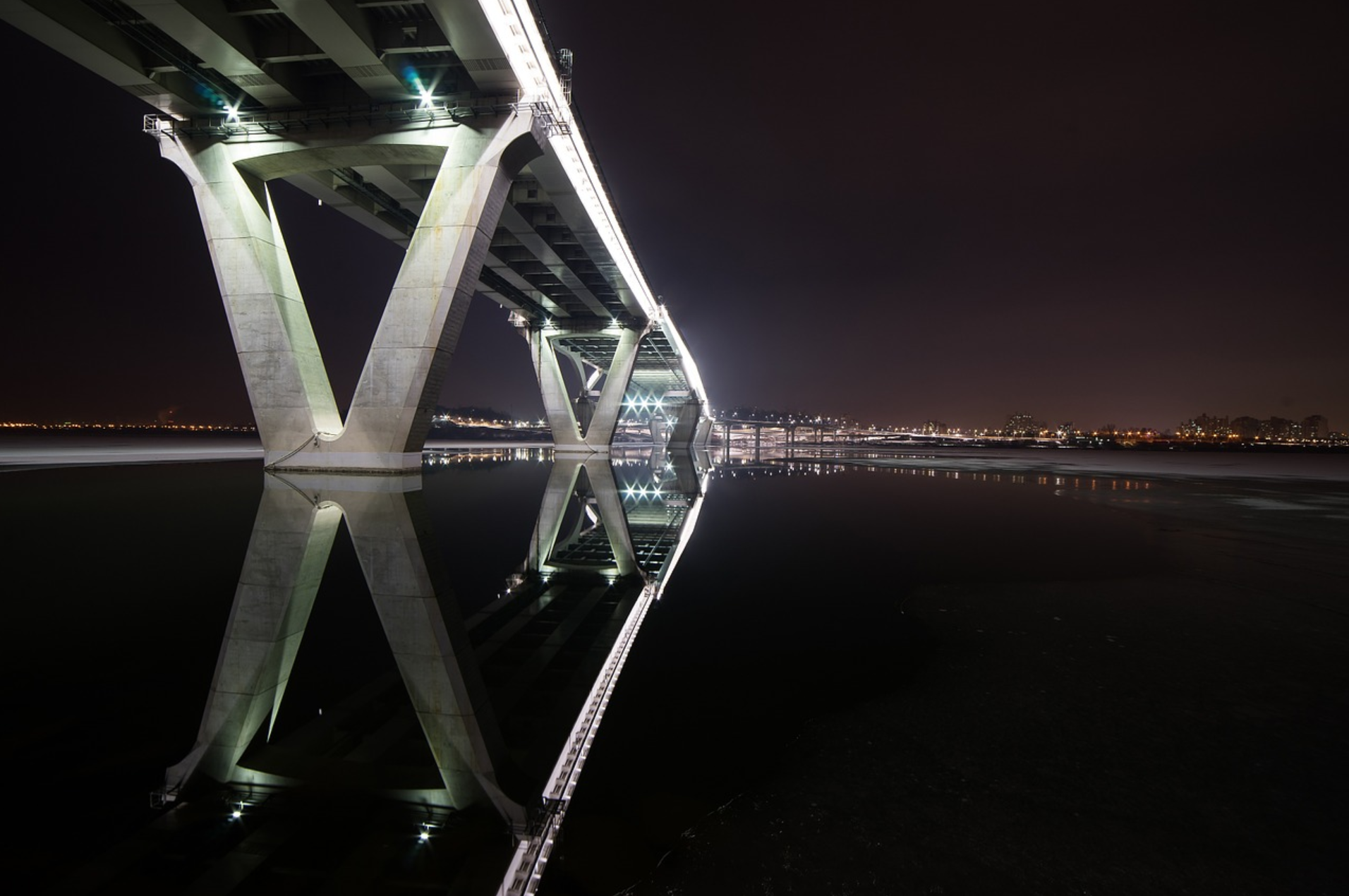
Below Guri-Amsa Bridge at night.

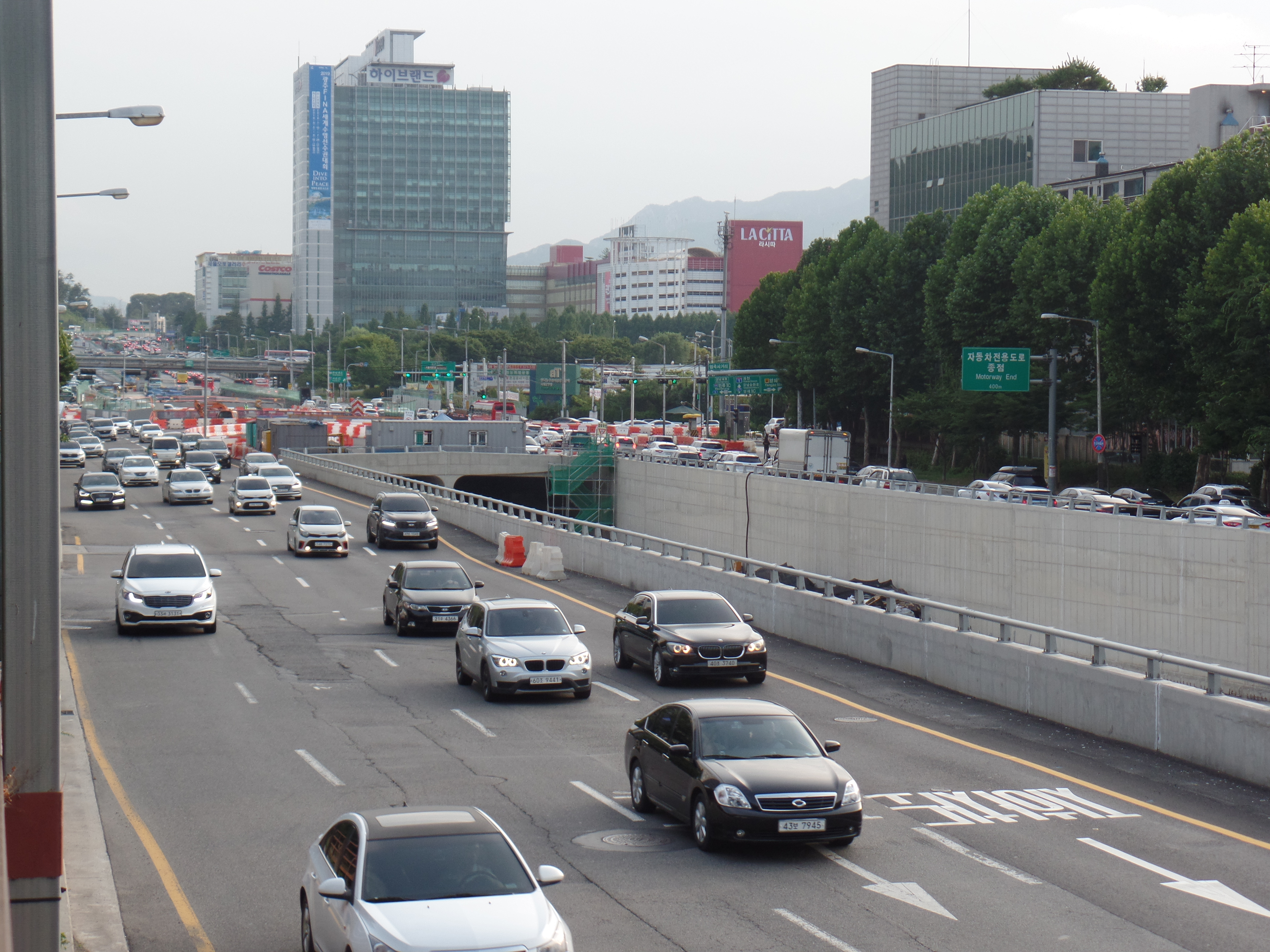
Yangjae-daero near Yeomgok Intersection.

Seoul

- Seocho District

Gyeonggi Province

- Gwacheon

Seoul

- Seocho District - Gangnam District - Songpa District - Gangdong District

Gyeonggi Province

- Guri

== List of Facilities ==
- (■): Motorway section

IS: Intersection, IC: Interchange

Name	Hangul name	Connection	Location		Note
Connected with Seoul City Route 94 Gangnam Beltway, Jungang-ro
Seonam IC	선암 나들목	Seoul City Route 31 (Umyeonsan-ro); Seoul City Route 94 (Gangnam Beltway); Taebong-ro	Seoul	Seocho District	Seonam Underpass(One-way)
Juam Bridge	주암교		Gwacheon	Juam-dong	National Route 47 overlap
Truck Terminal	트럭터미널앞	Maeheon-ro; Yangjae-daero 11-gil Yangjae-daero 12-gil	Seoul	Seocho District	National Route 47 overlap
Yangjae IC	양재 나들목	Gyeongbu Expressway	Seoul	Seocho District	National Route 47 overlap
Yeomgok IS	염곡사거리	Seoul City Route 41 (Gangnam-daero) (Heolleung-ro)	Seoul	Seocho District	National Route 47 overlap
Guryongsa IS	구룡사앞 교차로	Nonhyeon-ro	Seoul	Gangnam District	Guryong Underpass section National Route 47 overlap
Guryong Tunnel IS	구룡터널 교차로	Seoul City Route 51 (Eonju-ro) (Bundang-Naegok Urban Expressway)	Seoul	Gangnam District	National Route 47 overlap
Guryongma-eul Entrance IS	구룡마을입구 교차로	Seolleung-ro; Yangjae-daero 16-gil	Seoul	Gangnam District	National Route 47 overlap
Gaepo 3, 4 Complex IS	개포3,4단지 교차로	Samseong-ro	Seoul	Gangnam District	National Route 47 overlap
Irwon Tunnel IS	일원터널 교차로	National Route 47; Local Route 23 (Yeongdong-daero); Gwangpyeong-ro	Seoul	Gangnam District	Irwon Underpass section National Route 47 overlap Local Route 23 overlap
Samsung Seoul Hospital IS	삼성서울병원사거리	Irwon-ro	Seoul	Gangnam District	Local Route 23 overlap
Irwon 1-dong Community Center IS	일원1동주민센터앞 교차로	Yangjae-daero 55-gil	Seoul	Gangnam District	Local Route 23 overlap
Suseo IC	수서 나들목	Local Route 23 (Bamgogae-ro); Seoul City Route 61 (Dongbu Expressway); Seoul City Route 92 (Nambu Beltway)	Seoul	Gangnam District	Local Route 23 overlap Seoul City Route 92 overlap
Tancheon Bridge	탄천교		Seoul	Gangnam District	Seoul City Route 92 overlap
Tancheon Bridge			Seoul	Songpa District	Seoul City Route 92 overlap
Tancheon Bridge IS	탄천교 교차로	Tancheondong-ro	Seoul	Songpa District	Seoul City Route 92 overlap
Garak Market Entrance IS	가락시장입구 교차로	Garak Market	Seoul	Songpa District	Garak Underpass section Seoul City Route 92 overlap
Garak Market IS	가락시장 교차로	National Route 3 Seoul City Route 71 (Songpa-daero)	Seoul	Songpa District	Seoul City Route 92 overlap
Singa Elementary School IS	신가초교앞 교차로	Sungi-ro	Seoul	Songpa District	Seoul City Route 92 overlap
Ogeum IS	오금사거리	Ogeum-ro	Seoul	Songpa District	Seoul City Route 92 overlap
Bangi station IS	방이역사거리	Macheon-ro	Seoul	Songpa District	Seoul City Route 92 overlap
Olympic Park IS	올림픽공원사거리	Wiryeseong-daero	Seoul	Songpa District	Seoul City Route 92 overlap
Olympic Park East Gate IS (Olympic Park station)	올림픽공원동문 교차로 (올림픽공원역)		Seoul	Songpa District	Seoul City Route 92 overlap
Dunchondari	둔촌다리		Seoul	Songpa District	Seoul City Route 92 overlap
Korea National Sport University Seoul Seryun Elementary School Boseong High School Boseong Middle School	한국체육대학교 서울세륜초등학교 보성고등학교 보성중학교		Seoul	Songpa District	Seoul City Route 92 overlap
Dunchon IS	둔촌사거리	Seoul City Route 60 (Gangdong-daero)	Seoul	Songpa District	Seoul City Route 92 overlap
Dunchon IS		Seoul City Route 60 (Gangdong-daero)	Seoul	Gangdong District	Seoul City Route 92 overlap
Dunchon-dong station IS	둔촌동역 교차로	Pungseong-ro	Seoul	Gangdong District	Seoul City Route 92 overlap
Gildong IS	길동사거리	National Route 43; Seoul City Route 50 (Cheonho-daero)	Seoul	Gangdong District	Seoul City Route 92 overlap
Gildong station	길동역		Seoul	Gangdong District	Seoul City Route 92 overlap
Cheondong Elementary School Entrance IS	천동초교입구 교차로	Cheonjung-ro	Seoul	Gangdong District	Seoul City Route 92 overlap
Gubeundari station IS	굽은다리역 교차로	Sangam-ro	Seoul	Gangdong District	Seoul City Route 92 overlap
Myeongil station IS	명일역 교차로	Gucheonmyeon-ro	Seoul	Gangdong District	Seoul City Route 92 overlap
Dongbu Technical Education Center IS	동부기술교육원 교차로	Godeok-ro	Seoul	Gangdong District	Seoul City Route 92 overlap
Amsa Water Purification Facilities IS	암사정수센터 교차로	Arisu-ro	Seoul	Gangdong District	Seoul City Route 92 overlap
Amsa IC	암사 나들목	Seoul City Route 88 (Olympic-daero)	Seoul	Gangdong District	Seoul City Route 92 overlap
Guri-Amsa Bridge	구리암사대교		Seoul	Gangdong District	Seoul City Route 92 overlap
Guri-Amsa Bridge			Guri	Gyomun-dong	Seoul City Route 92 overlap
Acheon IC	아천 나들목	Gangbyeonbuk-ro	Guri	Gyomun-dong	Seoul City Route 92 overlap
Connected with Sagajeong-ro
