= Olympic Boulevard =

Olympic Boulevard may refer to:

- Olympic Boulevard (Los Angeles), a major arterial in Los Angeles
- Olympic Boulevard, an inner city road in Melbourne, formerly part of Swan Street
- Olympic Blvd Expressway, an urban expressway in Seoul, South Korea
