= Seoul City Route 60 =

Road in South Korea

Seoul Special Metropolitan City Route 60
- 서울특별시도 제60호선

Route information
- Length: 33.6 km (20.9 mi)

Major junctions
- From: Guro District, Seoul
- To: Gangdong District, Seoul

Location
- Country: South Korea

Highway system
- Highway systems of South Korea; Expressways; National; Local

Seoul Metropolitan City Route 60 (Korean: 서울특별시도 제60호선) is an urban road located in Seoul, South Korea. With a total length of 33.6 km (20.9 mi), this road starts from the Yuhan University in Guro District, Seoul to West Hanam Interchange in Gangdong District.

== Stopovers ==
Seoul

- Guro District - Yeongdeungpo District - Mapo District - Seodaemun District - Jung District - Seongdong District - Gwangjin District - Songpa District - Gangdong District

== List of Facilities ==
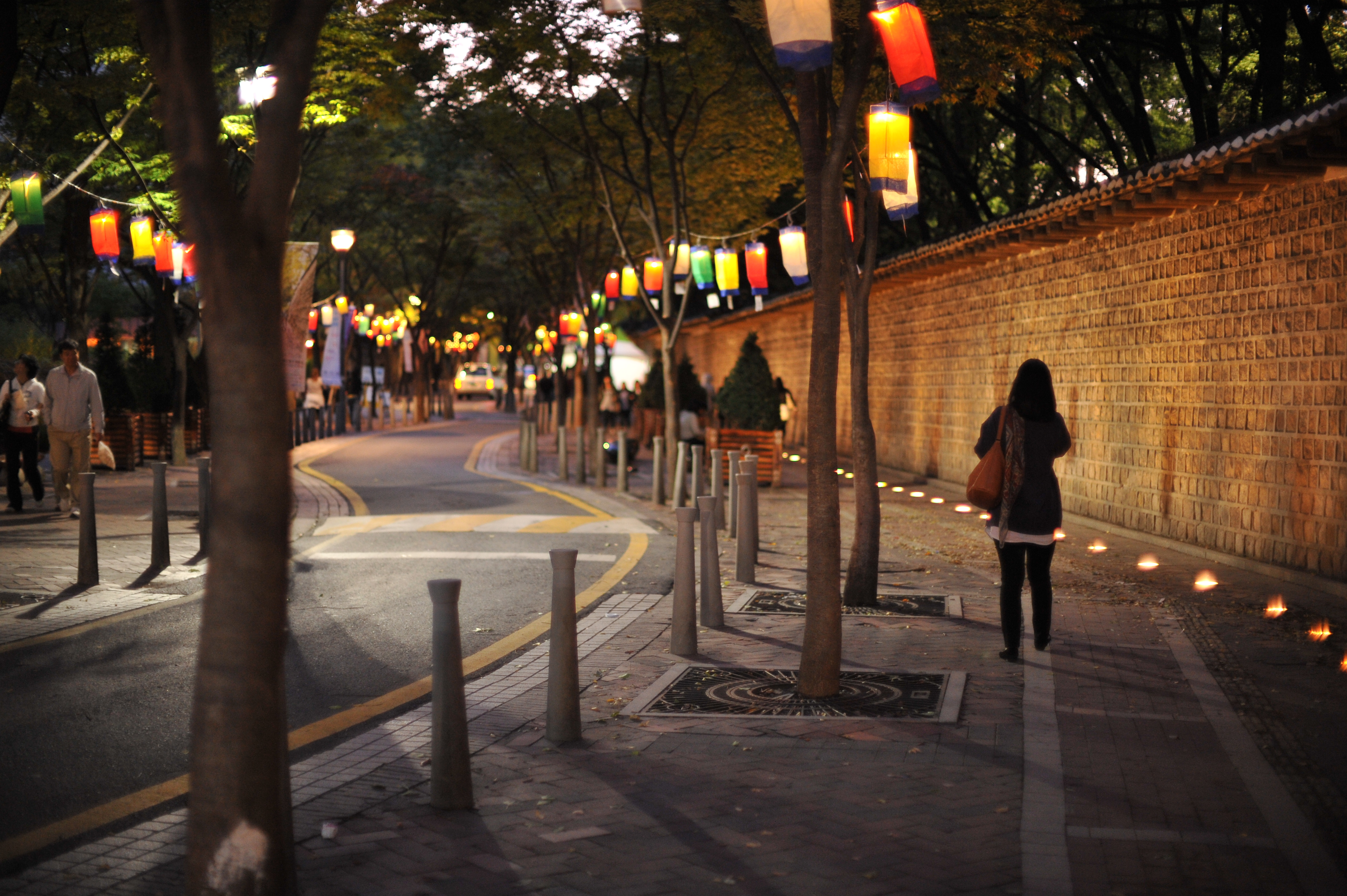
Deoksugung-gil in the night

IS: Intersection, IC: Interchange

- (■): Motorway section

Road name	Name	Hangul name	Connection	Location		Note
Connected with National Route 46 (Gyeongin-ro)
Gyeongin-ro	Sungkonghoe University Entrance IS	성공회대입구 교차로	Yeondong-ro	Seoul	Guro District	National Route 46 overlap
Gyeongin-ro	Onsu station Entrance	온수역입구 교차로	Gyeongin-ro 3-gil	Seoul	Guro District	National Route 46 overlap
Gyeongin-ro	Dongbu Steel Entrance IS	동부제강입구 교차로	Ori-ro	Seoul	Guro District	National Route 46 overlap
Gyeongin-ro	No name	(이름 없음)	Buil-ro	Seoul	Guro District	National Route 46 overlap
Gyeongin-ro	Front of City World IS	시티월드앞 교차로	Oryu-ro	Seoul	Guro District	National Route 46 overlap
Gyeongin-ro	Oryu-dong IS	오류동삼거리	Gocheok-ro	Seoul	Guro District	National Route 46 overlap
Gyeongin-ro	Oryu-dong station IS	오류동역앞 교차로	Gyeongin-ro 20-gil	Seoul	Guro District	National Route 46 overlap
Gyeongin-ro	Oryu IC	오류 나들목	Seoul City Route 92 (Nambu Beltway)	Seoul	Guro District	National Route 46 overlap
Gyeongin-ro	Gaebong IS	개봉사거리	Gaebong-ro; Gyeongseo-ro	Seoul	Guro District	National Route 46 overlap
Gyeongin-ro	Guro Fire Station IS	구로소방서 교차로	Jungang-ro	Seoul	Guro District	National Route 46 overlap
Gyeongin-ro	Gocheok Sky Dome	고척스카이돔		Seoul	Guro District	National Route 46 overlap
Gyeongin-ro	Dongyang Mirae University IS	동양미래대학앞 교차로	Anyangcheon-ro	Seoul	Guro District	National Route 46 overlap
Gyeongin-ro	Gocheok Bridge	고척교		Seoul	Guro District	National Route 46 overlap
Gyeongin-ro	Gocheok Bridge IS	고척교 교차로	National Route 1 (Seobu Urban Expressway)	Seoul	Guro District	National Route 46 overlap
Gyeongin-ro	Guro station IS	구로역 교차로	Gurojungang-ro	Seoul	Guro District	National Route 46 overlap Guro Underpass
Gyeongin-ro	Geori Park Entrance IS	거리공원입구 교차로	Gongwon-ro; Gyeongin-ro 61-gil	Seoul	Guro District	National Route 46 overlap
Gyeongin-ro	Dorim Bridge	도림교		Seoul	Guro District	National Route 46 overlap
Gyeongin-ro	Dorim Bridge			Seoul	Yeongdeungpo District	National Route 46 overlap
Gyeongin-ro	Dorim Bridge IS	도림교 교차로	Seoul City Route 90; Gyeongin-ro 71-gil	Seoul	Yeongdeungpo District	National Route 46 overlap
Gyeongin-ro	Mullae-dong IS	문래동사거리	Dorim-ro	Seoul	Yeongdeungpo District	National Route 46 overlap
Gyeongin-ro	Cheonggwa Market Entrance IS	청과시장입구 교차로	Yeongsin-ro	Seoul	Yeongdeungpo District	National Route 46 overlap
Gyeongin-ro	Yeongdeungpo station IS	영등포역 교차로	Yeongjung-ro	Seoul	Yeongdeungpo District	National Route 46 overlap
Gyeongin-ro	Yeongdeungpo Rotary	영등포로터리	Yeongdeungpo-ro; Singil-ro; Beodeunaru-ro; Nodeul-ro	Seoul	Yeongdeungpo District	National Route 46 overlap Yeongdeungpo Overpass
Gyeongin-ro	Seoul Bridge	서울교		Seoul	Yeongdeungpo District	National Route 46 overlap
Gyeongin-ro	Seoul Bridge IS	서울교 교차로	Yeouiseo-ro; Yeouidong-ro	Seoul	Yeongdeungpo District	National Route 46 overlap
Yeoui-daero	Seoul Bridge IS		Yeouiseo-ro; Yeouidong-ro	Seoul	Yeongdeungpo District	National Route 46 overlap
Yeoui-daero	Yeouido Park IS	여의도공원앞 교차로	Uisadang-daero	Seoul	Yeongdeungpo District	National Route 46 overlap
Yeoui-daero	No name	(이름 없음)	Gukjegeumyung-ro	Seoul	Yeongdeungpo District	National Route 46 overlap
Yeoui-daero	Mapo Bridge IS	마포대교 교차로	Yeouiseo-ro; Yeouidong-ro	Seoul	Yeongdeungpo District	National Route 46 overlap
Yeoui-daero	Mapo Bridge	마포대교		Seoul	Yeongdeungpo District	National Route 46 overlap
Yeoui-daero	Mapo Bridge			Seoul	Mapo District	National Route 46 overlap
Yeoui-daero	Mapo Br. IC	마포대교북단 나들목	Gangbyeonbuk-ro (Seoul City Route 70); National Route 46 (Gangbyeonbuk-ro); Prefectural Route 23 (Gangbyeonbuk-ro)	Seoul	Mapo District	National Route 46 overlap
Mapo-daero	Mapo Br. IC		Gangbyeonbuk-ro (Seoul City Route 70); National Route 46 (Gangbyeonbuk-ro); Prefectural Route 23 (Gangbyeonbuk-ro)	Seoul	Mapo District	National Route 46 overlap
Mapo-daero	Mapo Bridge Entrance IS (Mapo station)	마포대교입구 교차로 (마포역)	Tojeong-ro	Seoul	Mapo District	
Mapo-daero	No name	(이름 없음)	Keunumul-ro	Seoul	Mapo District	
Mapo-daero	No name	(이름 없음)	Dongmak-ro; Saechang-ro	Seoul	Mapo District	
Mapo-daero	Gongdeok IS (Gongdeok station)	공덕오거리 (공덕역)	Baekbeom-ro; Mallijae-ro	Seoul	Mapo District	
Mapo-daero	Aeogae station	애오개역		Seoul	Mapo District	
Mapo-daero	(Ahyeon Middle School)	(아현중학교)	Gullebang-ro	Seoul	Mapo District	
Mapo-daero	Ahyeon IS	아현교차로	National Route 6 (Sinchon-ro)	Seoul	Mapo District	National Route 6 overlap
Sinchon-ro	Ahyeon IS		National Route 6 (Sinchon-ro)	Seoul	Mapo District	National Route 6 overlap
Sinchon-ro	No name	(이름 없음)	Songijeong-ro	Seoul	Seodaemun District	National Route 6 overlap
Sinchon-ro	Chungjeong-ro IS	충정로사거리	National Route 6 (Chungjeong-ro); Gyeonggi-daero	Seoul	Seodaemun District	National Route 6 overlap
Seosomun-ro	Chungjeong-ro IS		National Route 6 (Chungjeong-ro); Gyeonggi-daero	Seoul	Seodaemun District	National Route 6 overlap
Seosomun-ro	(Chungjeongno station)	(충정로역)	Jungnim-ro	Seoul	Seodaemun District	
Seosomun-ro	Office of Waterworks IS	상수도사업본부 교차로	Cheongpa-ro	Seoul	Seodaemun District	Seosomun Overpass
Seosomun-ro	National Police Agency IS	경찰청앞 교차로	Seoul City Route 21 (Tongil-ro)	Seoul	Jung District	Seosomun Overpass
Seosomun-ro	City Hall IS (City Hall station)	시청 교차로 (시청역)	Sejong-daero; Sejong-daero 18-gil	Seoul	Jung District	One-way
Sejong-daero	City Hall IS (City Hall station)		Sejong-daero; Sejong-daero 18-gil	Seoul	Jung District	One-way
Sejong-daero	City Hall IS (Seoul Square, Daehan Gate, City Hall station)	시청 교차로 (서울광장, 대한문, 시청역)	Seoul City Route 31 (Sejong-daero); Deoksugung-gil	Seoul	Jung District	Seoul City Route 31 overlap One-way
Sogong-ro	City Hall IS (Seoul Square, Daehan Gate, City Hall station)		Seoul City Route 31 (Sejong-daero); Deoksugung-gil	Seoul	Jung District	Seoul City Route 31 overlap One-way
Sogong-ro	City Hall IS (City Hall, Seoul Square)	시청 교차로 (서울특별시청, 서울광장)	Seoul City Route 31 (Sogong-ro); Mugyo-ro	Seoul	Jung District	Seoul City Route 31 overlap One-way
Eulji-ro	City Hall IS (City Hall, Seoul Square)		Seoul City Route 31 (Sogong-ro); Mugyo-ro	Seoul	Jung District	Seoul City Route 31 overlap One-way
Eulji-ro	Eulji-ro 1-ga IS (Euljiro 1-ga station)	을지로1가 교차로 (을지로입구역)	Namdaemun-ro	Seoul	Jung District	
Eulji-ro	Eulji-ro 2-ga IS	을지로2가 교차로	Samil-daero	Seoul	Jung District	
Eulji-ro	Eulji-ro 3-ga IS (Euljiro 3-ga station)	을지로3가 교차로 (을지로3가역)	Chungmu-ro	Seoul	Jung District	
Eulji-ro	Seun Sangga (Sampung Sangga·Daelim Sangga)	세운상가 (삼풍상가·대림상가)	Eulji-ro 19-gil Eulji-ro 20-gil	Seoul	Jung District	
Eulji-ro	Eulji-ro 4-ga IS (Euljiro 4-ga station)	을지로4가 교차로 (을지로4가역)	Changgyeonggung-ro	Seoul	Jung District	
Eulji-ro	Eulji-ro 5-ga IS	을지로5가 교차로	Seoul City Route 41 (Dongho-ro)	Seoul	Jung District	
Eulji-ro	National Medical Center	국립중앙의료원		Seoul	Jung District	
Eulji-ro	Dongdaemun History & Culture Park IS	동대문역사문화공원 교차로	Jangchungdan-ro	Seoul	Jung District	
Eulji-ro	Dongdaemun History & Culture Park station IS	동대문역사문화공원역 교차로	Eulji-ro 45-gil	Seoul	Jung District	
Eulji-ro	Hanyang Technical High School IS	한양공고앞 교차로	Toegye-ro	Seoul	Jung District	
Toegye-ro	Hanyang Technical High School IS		Toegye-ro	Seoul	Jung District	
Toegye-ro	Sindang station IS	신당역 교차로	Dasan-ro	Seoul	Jung District	
Toegye-ro	The Road Traffic Authority IS	도로교통공단 교차로	Nangye-ro	Seoul	Jung District	
Wangsimni-ro	The Road Traffic Authority IS		Nangye-ro	Seoul	Jung District	
Wangsimni-ro	Sangwangsimni station IS	상왕십리역 교차로	Muhak-ro	Seoul	Seongdong District	
Wangsimni-ro	Wangsimni station IS	왕십리역 교차로	Seoul City Route 51 (Gosanja-ro); Wangsimnigwangjang-ro	Seoul	Seongdong District	
Wangsimni-ro	Hanyang University Hospital IS	한양대.병원 교차로	Majo-ro; Salgoji-gil	Seoul	Seongdong District	
Wangsimni-ro	Hanyang University Hanyang University station	한양대학교 한양대역		Seoul	Seongdong District	
Wangsimni-ro	Seongdong Bridge	성동교		Seoul	Seongdong District	
Wangsimni-ro	Seongdong Bridge IS	성동교 교차로	Wangsimni-ro; Gwangnaru-ro; Garam-gil	Seoul	Seongdong District	
Gwangnaru-ro	Seongdong Bridge IS		Wangsimni-ro; Gwangnaru-ro; Garam-gil	Seoul	Seongdong District	
Gwangnaru-ro	No name	(이름 없음)	Seongsuil-ro	Seoul	Seongdong District	
Gwangnaru-ro	Dental Uisa Hall IS	치과의사회관앞 교차로	Seongsui-ro	Seoul	Seongdong District	
Gwangnaru-ro	Hwayang IS	화양사거리	National Route 47 (Dongil-ro)	Seoul	Seongdong District	
Gwangnaru-ro	Hwayang IS		National Route 47 (Dongil-ro)	Seoul	Gwangjin District	
Gwangnaru-ro	Hwayang IS	화양삼거리	Gunja-ro	Seoul	Gwangjin District	
Gwangnaru-ro	Children's Grand Park station (Children's Grand Park)	어린이대공원역 교차로 (어린이대공원)	Neungdong-ro	Seoul	Gwangjin District	
Gwangnaru-ro	Guui IS	구의사거리	National Route 3 (Jayang-ro); Seoul City Route 71 (Jayang-ro)	Seoul	Gwangjin District	
Gwangnaru-ro	Guui Market IS	구의시장 교차로	Guui-ro	Seoul	Gwangjin District	
Gwangnaru-ro	No name	(이름 없음)	Walkerhill-ro	Seoul	Gwangjin District	
Gwangnaru-ro	Olympic Br. IS (North)	올림픽대교북단 교차로	Achasan-ro	Seoul	Gwangjin District	
Gwangnaru-ro	Gwangnam Middle School & High School Entrance IS	광남중·고교입구 교차로	Gwangnaru-ro 56-gil Achasan-ro 70-gil	Seoul	Gwangjin District	Can not enter the Olympic Bridge on the lower road
Gwangnaru-ro	Olympic Br. IC (North)	올림픽대교북단 나들목	Gangbyeonbuk-ro (Seoul City Route 70); National Route 46 (Gangbyeonbuk-ro)	Seoul	Gwangjin District	
Gwangnaru-ro	Olympic Bridge	올림픽대교		Seoul	Gwangjin District	
Gangdong-daero	Olympic Bridge			Seoul	Songpa District	
Gangdong-daero	Olympic Br. IC (South)	올림픽대교남단 나들목	Olympic-daero (Seoul City Route 88)	Seoul	Songpa District	
Gangdong-daero	Olympic Br. IS (South)	올림픽대교남단 교차로	Seoul City Route 90 (Olympic-ro)	Seoul	Songpa District	
Gangdong-daero	No name	(이름 없음)	Toseong-ro	Seoul	Songpa District	
Gangdong-daero	No name		Toseong-ro	Seoul	North:Gangdong District; South:Songpa District	
Gangdong-daero	Olympic Park 2nd North Gate IS	올림픽공원북2문 교차로		Seoul	North:Gangdong District; South:Songpa District	
Gangdong-daero	Dunchon IS (Korea National Sport University)	둔촌사거리 (한국체육대학교)	Seoul City Route 92 (Yangjae-daero)	Seoul	North:Gangdong District; South:Songpa District	
Gangdong-daero	West Hanam IC Entrance IS	서하남IC입구 교차로	Dongnam-ro	Seoul	North:Gangdong District; South:Songpa District	
Connected with Hanam City Route 180 (Seohanam-ro)
