= Seoul City Route 92 =

Road in South Korea

Seoul Special Metropolitan City Route 92
- 서울특별시도 제92호선

Route information
- Length: 44.6 km (27.7 mi)

Major junctions
- From: Gangseo District, Seoul
- To: Gangdong District, Seoul

Location
- Country: South Korea

Highway system
- Highway systems of South Korea; Expressways; National; Local

Seoul Metropolitan City Route 92 (Korean: 서울특별시도 제92호선) is an urban road located in Gyeonggi Province and Seoul, South Korea. With a total length of 44.6 km (27.7 mi), this road starts from the Haengju Bridge in Gangseo District, Seoul to Amsa Water Purification Facilities in Gangdong District. Nambu Beltway is a part of this route.

== Stopovers ==
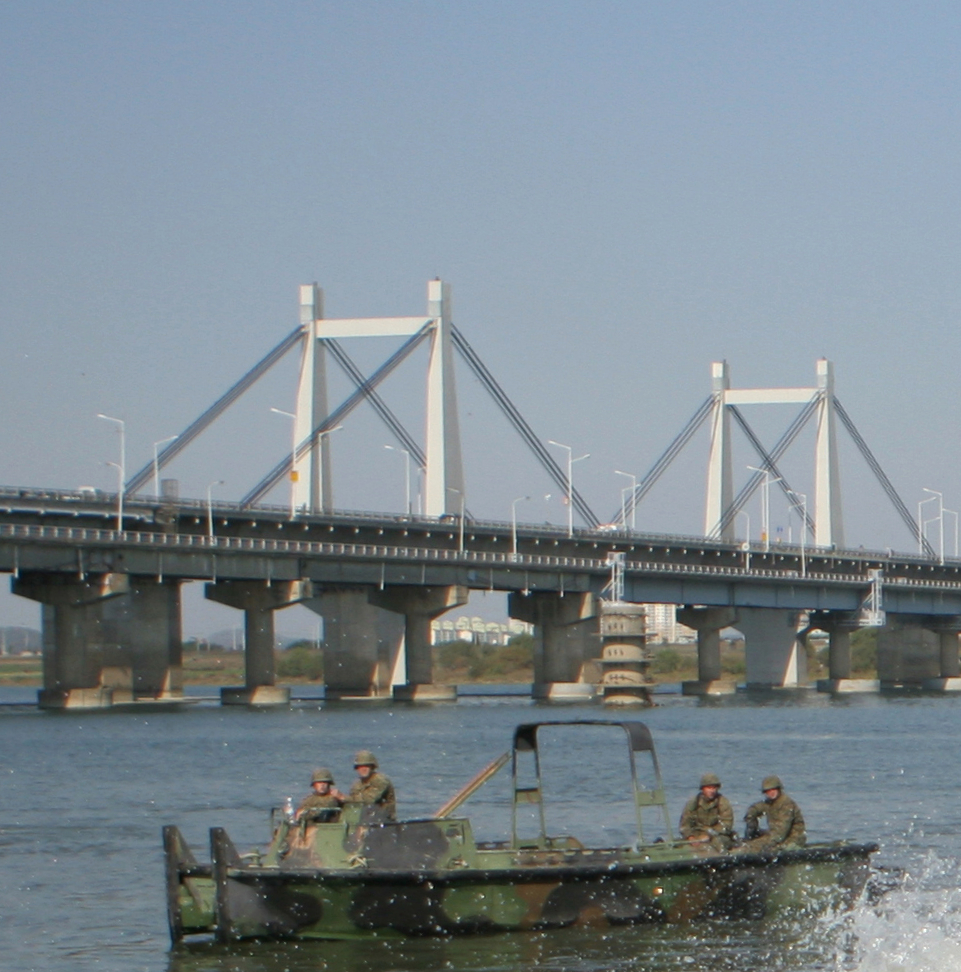
Haengju Bridge during Republic of Korea Army exercise.

Seoul

- Gangseo District - Yangcheon District - Guro District

Gyeonggi Province

- Gwangmyeong

Seoul

- Guro District - Geumcheon District - Gwanak District - Dongjak District - Seocho District - Gangnam District - Songpa District - Gangdong District

== List of Facilities ==
IS: Intersection, IC: Interchange

| Road name | Name | Hangul name | Connection | Location | | Note |
Connected with Hoguk-ro
| Gaehwadong-ro | Haengju Bridge | 행주대교 | | Seoul | Gangseo District | National Route 39 overlap Prefectural Route 78 overlap |
| Gaehwadong-ro | Gaehwa IC | 개화 나들목 | National Route 39 (Beolmal-ro); Seoul City Route 88 (Olympic-daero); Gimpohangang-ro | Seoul | Gangseo District | National Route 39 overlap Prefectural Route 78 overlap |
| Gaehwadong-ro | No name | (이름 없음) | Prefectural Route 78 (Geumpo-ro) | Seoul | Gangseo District | Prefectural Route 78 overlap |
| Gaehwadong-ro | Sangsama-eul | 상사마을 | National Route 48 (Gimpo-daero) | Seoul | Gangseo District | National Route 48 overlap |
| Gaehwadong-ro | Gaehwa Station Entrance | 개화역입구 | Gaehwadong-ro 8-gil | Seoul | Gangseo District | National Route 48 overlap |
| Gaehwadong-ro | Gaehwa IS (Gimpo Airport IC) | 개화사거리 (김포공항 나들목) | Incheon International Airport Expressway; Yangcheon-ro | Seoul | Gangseo District | National Route 48 overlap |
| Gaehwadong-ro | Gimpo Airport IS | 김포공항 교차로 | Gimpo International Airport; Chowon-ro | Seoul | Gangseo District | National Route 48 overlap Gaehwa-dong Underpass section |
| Gaehwadong-ro | Banghwa Middle School | 방화중학교 | | Seoul | Gangseo District | National Route 48 overlap |
| Gaehwadong-ro | Gimpo Airport Entrance IS | 김포공항입구 교차로 | Gimpo International Airport (Haneul-gil); National Route 48 (Gonghang-daero); Banghwadong-ro | Seoul | Gangseo District | National Route 48 overlap Gonghang Underpass section |
| | Continuation into Nambu Beltway | | | | | |
Yangjae-daero
| Yangjae-daero | Tancheon Bridge | 탄천교 | | Seoul | Songpa District | |
| Yangjae-daero | Tancheon Bridge IS | 탄천교 교차로 | Tancheondong-ro | Seoul | Songpa District | |
| Yangjae-daero | Garak Market Entrance IS | 가락시장입구 교차로 | Garak Market | Seoul | Songpa District | Garak Underpass section |
| Yangjae-daero | Garak Market IS | 가락시장 교차로 | National Route 3 Seoul City Route 71 (Songpa-daero) | Seoul | Songpa District | |
| Yangjae-daero | Singa Elementary School IS | 신가초교앞 교차로 | Sungi-ro | Seoul | Songpa District | |
| Yangjae-daero | Ogeum IS | 오금사거리 | Ogeum-ro | Seoul | Songpa District | |
| Yangjae-daero | Bangi Station IS | 방이역사거리 | Macheon-ro | Seoul | Songpa District | |
| Yangjae-daero | Olympic Park IS | 올림픽공원사거리 | Wiryeseong-daero | Seoul | Songpa District | |
| Yangjae-daero | Olympic Park East Gate IS (Olympic Park station) | 올림픽공원동문 교차로 (올림픽공원역) | | Seoul | Songpa District | |
| Yangjae-daero | Dunchondari | 둔촌다리 | | Seoul | Songpa District | |
| Yangjae-daero | Korea National Sport University Seoul Seryun Elementary School Boseong High School Boseong Middle School | 한국체육대학교 서울세륜초등학교 보성고등학교 보성중학교 | | Seoul | Songpa District | |
| Yangjae-daero | Dunchon IS | 둔촌사거리 | Seoul City Route 60 (Gangdong-daero) | Seoul | Songpa District | |
| Yangjae-daero | Dunchon IS | | Seoul City Route 60 (Gangdong-daero) | | Gangdong District | |
| Yangjae-daero | Dunchon-dong Station IS | 둔촌동역 교차로 | Pungseong-ro | | Gangdong District | |
| Yangjae-daero | Gildong IS | 길동사거리 | National Route 43; Seoul City Route 50 (Cheonho-daero) | | Gangdong District | |
| Yangjae-daero | Gildong Station | 길동역 | | | Gangdong District | |
| Yangjae-daero | Cheondong Elementary School Entrance IS | 천동초교입구 교차로 | Cheonjung-ro | | Gangdong District | |
| Yangjae-daero | Gubeundari Station IS | 굽은다리역 교차로 | Sangam-ro | | Gangdong District | |
| Yangjae-daero | Myeongil Station IS | 명일역 교차로 | Gucheonmyeon-ro | | Gangdong District | |
| Yangjae-daero | Dongbu Technical Education Center IS | 동부기술교육원 교차로 | Godeok-ro | | Gangdong District | |
| Yangjae-daero | Amsa Water Purification Facilities IS | 암사정수센터 교차로 | Arisu-ro | | Gangdong District | |
| Yangjae-daero | Connected with Guri-Amsa Bridge | | | | | |
