= Nambu Beltway =

South Korean urban road

Seoul Special Metropolitan City Route 92
- 서울특별시도 제92호선
- Nambu Beltway 남부순환로

Route information
- Length: 32.6 km (20.3 mi)
- Existed: 1977–present

Major junctions
- West end: Gangseo District, Seoul
- Sinwol IC; Oryu IC; Guro IC; Siheung IC; Seocho IC; Suseo IC
- East end: Gangnam District, Seoul

Location
- Country: South Korea
- Major cities: Seoul, Gwangmyeong

Highway system
- Highway systems of South Korea; Expressways; National; Local

Nambu Beltway (Korean: 남부순환로) is a 6-10 lanes urban road located in Gyeonggi Province and Seoul, South Korea. With a total length of 32.6 km (20.3 mi), this road starts from the Gimpo International Airport Entrance Intersection in Gangseo District, Seoul to Suseo Interchange in Gangnam District. Nambu Beltway is a part of Seoul City Route 92.

== Stopovers ==
Seoul

- Gangseo District - Yangcheon District - Guro District

Gyeonggi Province

- Gwangmyeong

Seoul

- Guro District - Geumcheon District - Gwanak District - Dongjak District - Seocho District - Gangnam District

== List of Facilities ==
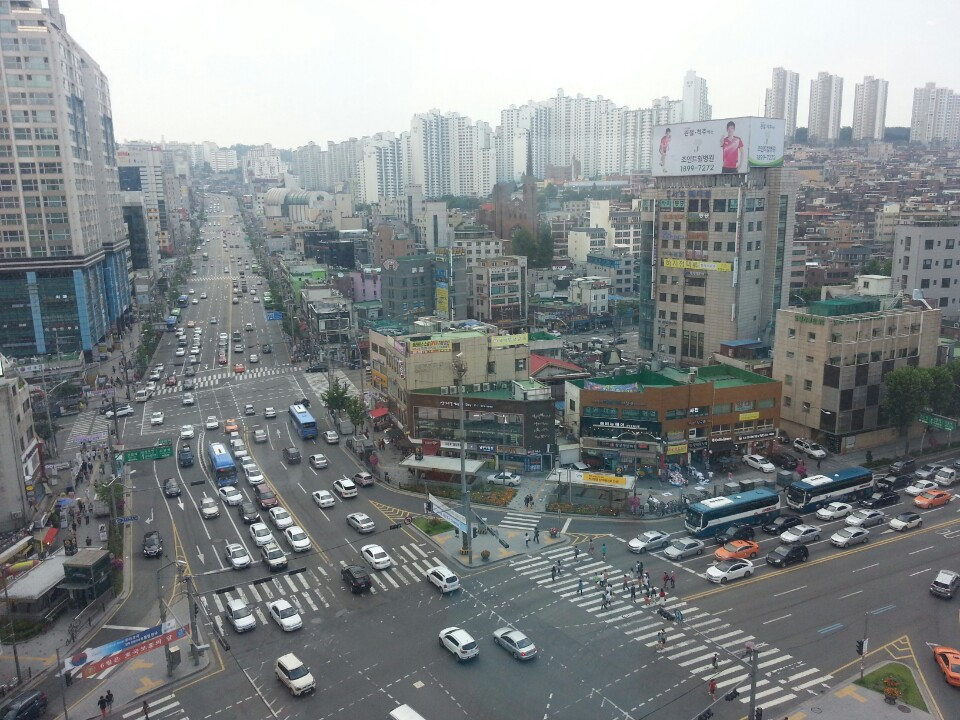
Seoul National University Station Intersection and Bongcheon-ro Intersection.

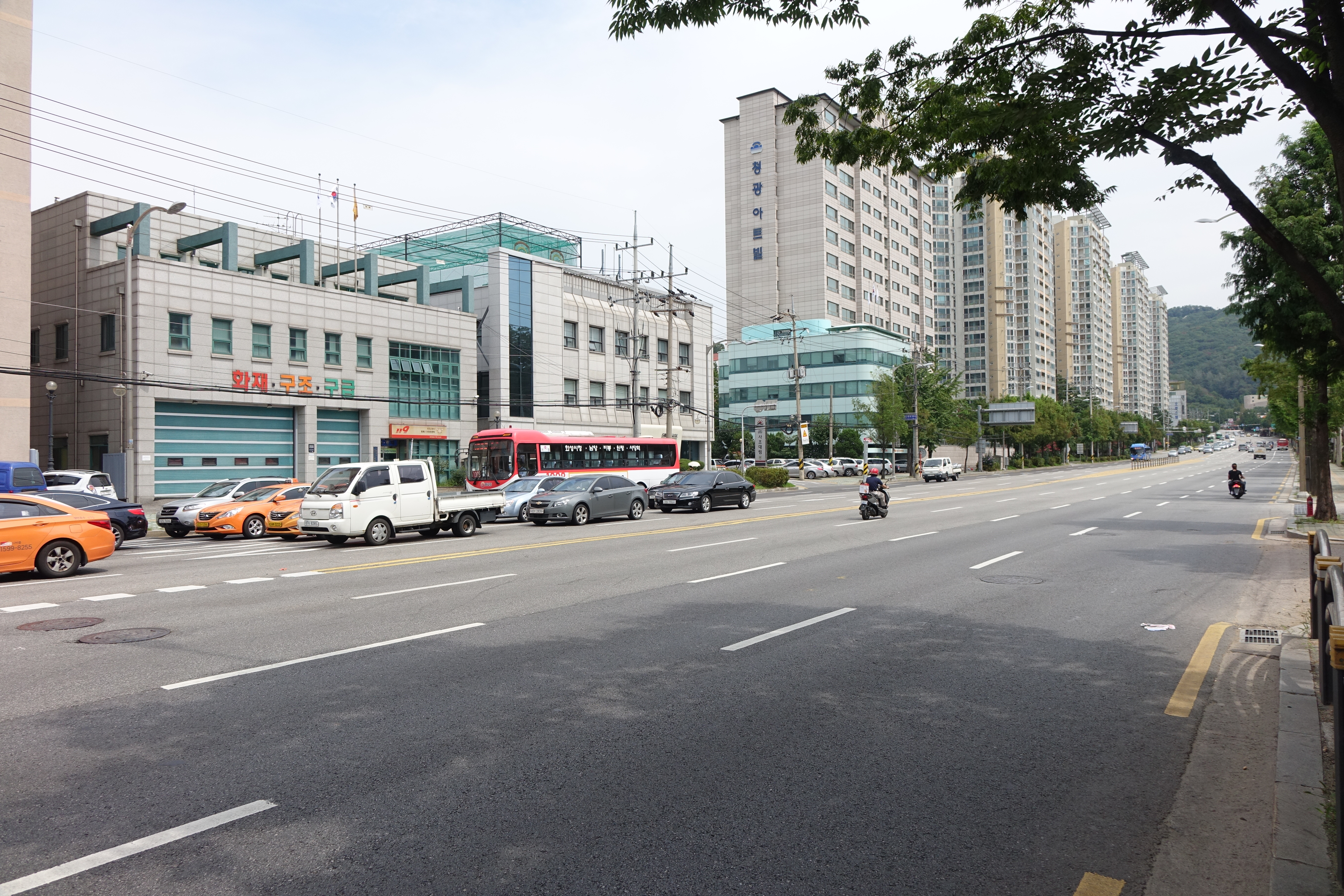
Sadang Station Intersection - Kyungnam Apartment Intersection.

IS: Intersection, IC: Interchange

Name	Hangul name	Connection	Location		Note
Directly connected with Seoul City Route 92 (Gaehwadong-ro)
Gimpo Airport Entrance IS	김포공항입구 교차로	Gimpo International Airport (Haneul-gil); National Route 48 (Gonghang-daero); Banghwadong-ro	Seoul	Gangseo District	Gonghang Underpass
Gonghang-dong Catholic Church	공항동천주교회	Songjeong-ro	Seoul	Gangseo District	
Songjeong Middle School	송정중학교		Seoul	Gangseo District	
Oebalsan IS	외발산사거리	National Route 6 National Route 77 (Banghwa-daero) (Balsan-ro)	Seoul	Gangseo District	Oebalsan Underpass
Gangseo License Examination Center	강서운전면허시험장		Seoul	Gangseo District	Oebalsan Underpass
Gangseo License Examination Center IS	강서면허시험장 교차로	Sumyeong-ro	Seoul	Gangseo District	Oebalsan Underpass
Hwagok-ro Entrance IS	화곡로입구 교차로	Hwagok-ro	Seoul	Yangcheon District	
Sinwol IS	신월사거리	Garogongwon-ro	Seoul	Yangcheon District	
Yangseo Middle School	양서중학교		Seoul	Yangcheon District	
West Seoul Lake Park IS	서서울호수공원앞 교차로	Gomdallae-ro; Nambusunhwan-ro 58-gil	Seoul	Yangcheon District	
Sinwol IC	신월 나들목	Gyeongin Expressway; Gukhoe-daero	Seoul	Yangcheon District	
National Forensic Service IS	과학수사연구원입구 교차로	Omok-ro; Nambusunhwan-ro 72-gil	Seoul	Yangcheon District	
Gangwol Elementary School Entrance IS	강월초교입구 교차로	Sinwol-ro	Seoul	Yangcheon District	
Seobu Truck Terminal IS	서부트럭터미널 교차로	Sinjeong-ro	Seoul	Yangcheon District	Seobu Truck Terminal Underpass
Gaebong 1-dong IS	개봉1동사거리	Gocheok-ro	Seoul	Guro District	
Oryu IC	오류 나들목	National Route 46; Seoul City Route 60 (Gyeongin-ro)	Seoul	Guro District	
Gaebong Railway Underpass	개봉철도지하차도	Seohaean-ro	Seoul	Guro District	Can't entry from Gaehwa-bound
Gaebong Overpass	개봉고가차도	Gaebong-ro 19-gil Nambusunhwan-ro 95-gil	Seoul	Guro District	Gaebong Underpass
Gwangbok Bridge	광복교		Seoul	Guro District	
Gwangbok Bridge			Gyeonggi Province	Gwangmyeong	
Anyang Bridge	안양교		Gyeonggi Province	Gwangmyeong	
Anyang Bridge			Seoul	Guro District	
Guro IC	구로 나들목	Gamasan-ro; Guil-ro	Seoul	Guro District	
Garibong Overpass	가리봉고가차도		Seoul	Guro District	
No name	(이름 없음)	Gurodong-ro; Beotkkot-ro 36-gil	Seoul	Guro District	
Digital Complex IS	디지털단지오거리	Gasa-ro; Digital-ro	Seoul	Geumcheon District	
Seoul Yunhee Beauty High School Entrance IS	서울연희미용고입구 교차로	Nambusunhwan-ro 108-gil Nambusunhwan-ro 407-gil	Seoul	Geumcheon District	
Seoul Gasan Elementary School	서울가산초등학교		Seoul	Geumcheon District	
Siheung IC	시흥 나들목	Seoul City Route 21 (Siheung-daero)	Seoul	Geumcheon District	
Siheung IC		Seoul City Route 21 (Siheung-daero)	Seoul	Gwanak District	
Guro Telephone Office IS	구로전화국 교차로	Doksan-ro; Jowonjungang-ro	Seoul	Gwanak District	
Seoul Geumcheon Police Station	서울금천경찰서		Seoul	Gwanak District	
Nangok IS	난곡사거리	Nangok-ro	Seoul	Gwanak District	Sillim-Bongcheon Tunnel (Under construction)
Bongnim Bridge	봉림교	Gwancheon-ro	Seoul	Gwanak District	
Sillim Station IS (Sillim Station)	신림역사거리 (신림역)	Sillim-ro	Seoul	Gwanak District	
Gwanak Post Office IS	관악우체국 교차로	Nambusunhwan-ro 191-gil	Seoul	Gwanak District	
Bongcheon Station	봉천역		Seoul	Gwanak District	
No name	(이름 없음)	Yangnyeong-ro	Seoul	Gwanak District	
Seoul National University Station IS (Seoul National University Station)	서울대입구역 교차로 (서울대입구역)	Gwanak-ro	Seoul	Gwanak District	
Wondang Elementary School Entrance IS	원당초교입구 교차로	Bongcheon-ro	Seoul	Gwanak District	
Nakseongdae Entrance IS	낙성대입구 교차로	Nakseongdae-ro; Nambusunhwan-ro 237-gil	Seoul	Gwanak District	
Nakseongdae Station	낙성대역		Seoul	Gwanak District	
Kkachigogae IS	까치고개 교차로	Inhyeon-gil; Nambusunhwan-ro 249-gil	Seoul	Gwanak District	
Sadang Station IS (Sadang Station) (Sadang Overpass)	사당역사거리 (사당역) (사당고가차도)	Gwacheon-daero; Dongjak-daero	Seoul	Gwanak District	
Sadang Station IS (Sadang Station) (Sadang Overpass)		Gwacheon-daero; Dongjak-daero	Seoul	Seocho District	
Seoul Metro IS	서울메트로 교차로	Hyoryeong-ro	Seoul	Seocho District	
Kyungnam Apartment IS	경남아파트앞 교차로	Bangbae-ro	Seoul	Seocho District	
Raemian Art Hill IS	래미안아트힐 교차로	Myeongdal-ro	Seoul	Seocho District	
National Gugak Center Seoul Arts Center	국립국악원 예술의 전당		Seoul	Seocho District	
Arts Center IS	예술의전당 교차로	Seoul City Route 31 (Banpo-daero)	Seoul	Seocho District	
Umyeong IS	우면삼거리	Seochojungang-ro	Seoul	Seocho District	
Seocho IC	서초 나들목	Old Gyeongbu Expressway	Seoul	Seocho District	
Seocho District Office IS	서초구청 교차로	Seoun-ro	Seoul	Seocho District	
Seocho District Office	서초구청		Seoul	Seocho District	
Yangjae Station IS (Yangjae Station)	양재역사거리 (양재역)	Seoul City Route 41 (Gangnam-daero)	Seoul	Seocho District	
Yangjae 1-dong Community Center	양재1동주민센터		Seoul	Seocho District	
Yangjae Telephone Office IS	양재전화국사거리	Nonhyeon-ro	Seoul	Seocho District	
Yangjae Telephone Office IS		Nonhyeon-ro	Seoul	Gangnam District	
Maebong Station IS (Maebong Station)	매봉역 교차로 (매봉역)	Nambusunhwan-ro 377-gil Nambusunhwan-ro 378-gil	Seoul	Gangnam District	
Educational Broadcasting System (EBS)	한국교육방송공사		Seoul	Gangnam District	
Maebong Tunnel IS	매봉터널 교차로	Seoul City Route 51 (Eonju-ro)	Seoul	Gangnam District	
Sookmyung Girls' High School Sookmyung Girls' Middle School	숙명여자고등학교 숙명여자중학교		Seoul	Gangnam District	
Dogok Station IS (Dogok Station)	도곡역 교차로 (도곡역)	Seolleung-ro	Seoul	Gangnam District	
Daechi Station IS (Daechi Station)	대치역 교차로 (대치역)	Samseong-ro	Seoul	Gangnam District	
Seoul Daegok Elementary School	서울대곡초등학교		Seoul	Gangnam District	
Hangnyeoul Station IS (Hangnyeoul Station)	학여울역 교차로 (학여울역)	National Route 47; Prefectural Route 23 (Yeongdong-daero)	Seoul	Gangnam District	
Seoul Trade Exhibition Center Daechi Bridge	서울무역전시컨벤션센터 대치교		Seoul	Gangnam District	
Tancheon 1 Bridge (Daechi Underpass)	탄천1교 교차로 (대치지하차도)	Samjeon-ro	Seoul	Gangnam District	Underpass Gaehwa-bound Only
No name	(이름 없음)	Gaepo-ro	Seoul	Gangnam District	
Suseo IC	수서 나들목	Seoul City Route 61 (Dongbu Expressway); Prefectural Route 23; Seoul City Route 92 (Yangjae-daero)	Seoul	Gangnam District	
Directly connected with Bamgogae-ro Go to Yangjae-daero if want to continue on Seoul City Route 92.
