= National Route 47 (South Korea) =

Road in South Korea

National Route 47
- Ansan-Gimhwa Line 국도 제47호선

Route information
- Length: 133.8 km (83.1 mi)
- Existed: 14 March 1981–present

Major junctions
- South end: Ansan, Gyeonggi Province
- North end: Cheorwon County, Gangwon Province

Location
- Country: South Korea

Highway system
- Highway systems of South Korea; Expressways; National; Local

National Route 47 (Korean: 국도 제47호선) is a national highway in South Korea connects Ansan to Cheorwon County. It established on 14 March 1981.

== Main stopovers ==
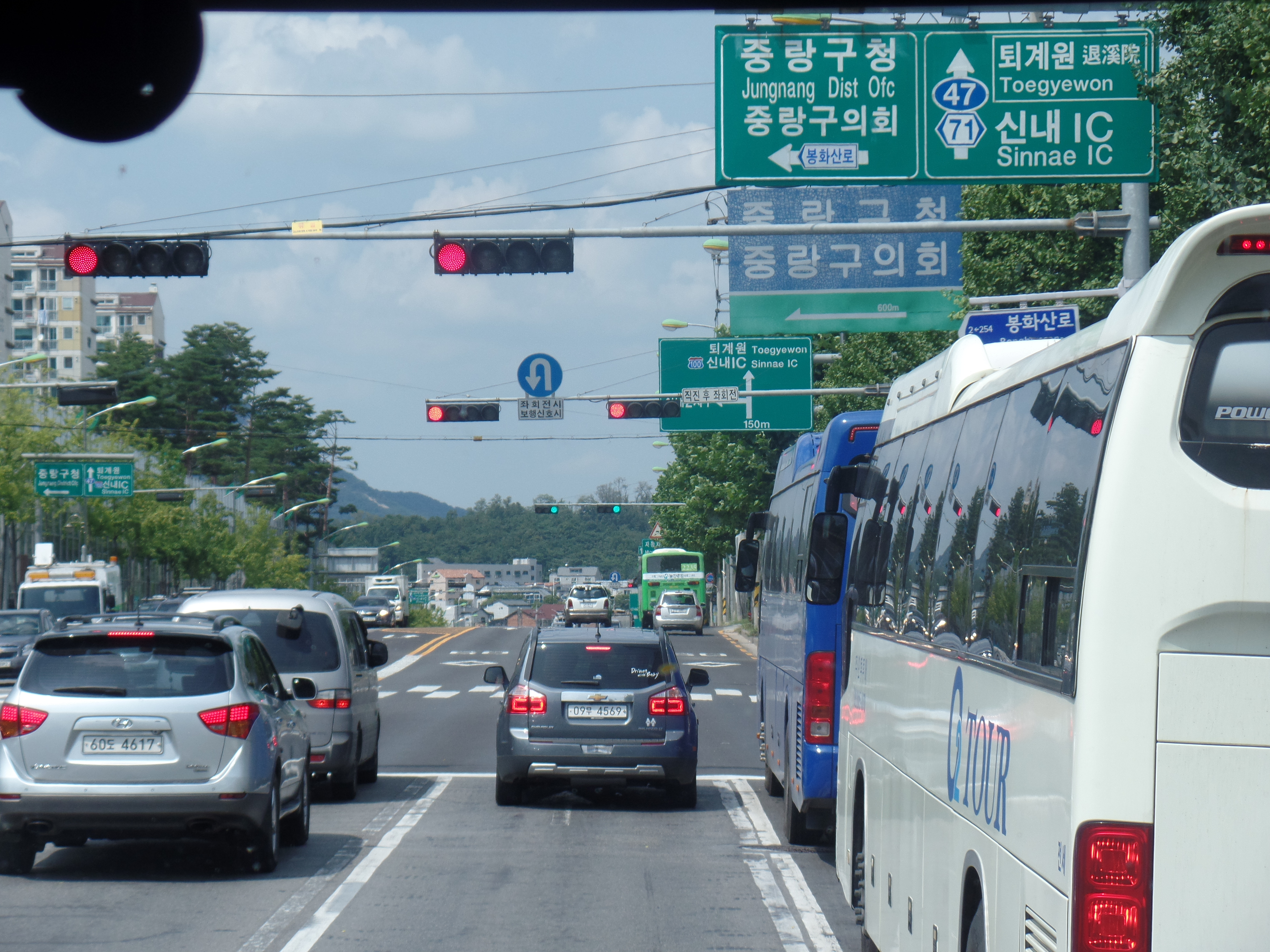
Neungsan Intersection at Jungnang District, Seoul.

Gyeonggi Province

- Ansan (Sangnok District) - Gunpo - Ansan - Gunpo - Anyang (Dongan District) - Uiwang - Anyang - Gwacheon

Seoul

- Seocho District - Gangnam District - Yeongdong Bridge - Gwangjin District - Jungnang District

Gyeonggi Province

- Guri - Namyangju - Pocheon - Gapyeong - Pocheon

Gangwon Province

- Cheorwon County

== Major intersections ==
- (■): Motorway

IS: Intersection, IC: Interchange

=== Gyeonggi Province (South of Seoul) ===
Name	Hangul name	Connection	Location		Note
Yangchon IC	양촌 나들목	National Route 39 (Seohae-ro); National Route 42 (Suin-ro)	Ansan City	Sangnok District	Terminus
Gunpo IC	군포 나들목	Yeongdong Expressway	Gunpo City	Daeya-dong	
Daeyami IS (Daeyami station)	대야미삼거리 (대야미역)	Daeya 1-ro	Gunpo City	Daeya-dong	
Health Center IS (Daeya Underpass)	보건소사거리 (대야지하차도)	Beonyeong-ro	Gunpo City	Gunpo-dong	South Gunpo IC; Indirect connected with (Pyeongtaek-Paju Expressway); East Gunpo IC; Indirect connected with (Yeongdong Expressway)
Samsung Underpass IS (Samsung Underpass)	삼성지하차도사거리 (삼성지하차도)	Samsung-ro	Gunpo City	Gunpo-dong	
Anyang Benest Golf Club IS	안양베네스트골프클럽앞삼거리	Samsung-ro	Gunpo City	Gunpo-dong	
Yongho IS	용호사거리	Yongho 1-ro Yongho 2-ro	Gunpo City	Gunpo-dong	
Gunpo Elementary IS (Doraemal Underpass)	군포초교사거리 (도래말지하차도)	Gosan-ro	Gunpo City	Gunpo-dong	
Gunpo Elementary School	군포초등학교		Gunpo City	Gunpo-dong	
Dangdong Post Office IS	당동우체국사거리	Dangdong-ro; Bongseong-ro	Gunpo City	Gunpo-dong	
Gunpo station (Gunpo Station Entrance IS) Gunpo 1-dong Community Center	군포역 (군포역입구사거리) 군포1동주민센터	Gunpoyeok 1-gil Gunpo-ro 529beon-gil	Gunpo City	Gunpo-dong	
Gunpo Station Market	군포역전시장		Gunpo City	Gunpo-dong	
Woori Bank IS	우리은행사거리	Sanbon-ro	Gunpo City	Gunpo-dong	
Dangdong Underpass	당동지하차도	Gongdan-ro; Nongsim-ro	Gunpo City	Gunpo-dong	
Dangdong Underpass		Gongdan-ro; Nongsim-ro	Gunpo City	Geumjeong-dong	
Geumjeong Overpass	금정고가차도	Gunpo-ro; Beonyeong-ro	Gunpo City	Geumjeong-dong	
Gunpo Bridge	군포교		Gunpo City	Geumjeong-dong	
Gunpo Bridge			Anyang City	Dongan District	
Distribution Complex IS (Hogye Overpass)	유통단지사거리 (호계고가차도)	LS-ro	Anyang City	Dongan District	
Hogye IS (Hogye 1-dong Community Center)	호계사거리 (호계1동주민센터)	National Route 1 (Gyeongsu-daero)	Anyang City	Dongan District	
Deokgogae IS	덕고개사거리	Morang-ro; Pyeongchon-daero	Anyang City	Dongan District	
Gyewondae IS	계원대사거리	Gwanpyeong-ro; Gyewondaehang-ro	Anyang City	Dongan District	Pyeongchon IC; Connected with (Seoul Ring Expressway)
Anyang Wholesale Market	안양농수산물도매시장	Naeson-ro; Singi-daero	Anyang City	Dongan District	
Minbaek IS (Pyeongchon Underpass)	민백사거리 (평촌지하차도)	Gwiin-ro; Poil-ro	Anyang City	Dongan District	
Beolmal IS	벌말오거리	Simin-daero; Hagui-ro	Anyang City	Dongan District	
Indeogwon IS (Indeogwon station)	인덕원사거리 (인덕원역)	Prefectural Route 57 (Gwanak-daero) (Anyangpangyo-ro)	Anyang City	Dongan District	
North Uiwang IC	북의왕 나들목	Second Gyeongin Expressway	Gwacheon City	Galhyeon-dong	
Galhyeon IS	갈현삼거리	Jungang-ro	Gwacheon City	Galhyeon-dong	
Gwacheon IC	과천 나들목	Prefectural Route 309 (Bongdam-Gwacheon Urban Expressway); Koorong-ro	Gwacheon City	Munwon-dong	
Daegongwon Entrance	대공원입구	Daegongwon-daero; Prefectural Route 309 (Umyeonsan-ro)	Gwacheon City	Gwacheon-dong	
Gwanmun IS	관문사거리	Gwacheon-daero; Jungang-ro	Gwacheon City	Gwacheon-dong	
Seonam IS (Seonbawi station)	선암삼거리 (선바위역)	Gyeongmagongwon-daero	Gwacheon City	Gwacheon-dong	Continuation into Seoul

=== Seoul ===
Name	Hangul name	Connection	Location		Note
Seonam IC	선암 나들목	Prefectural Route 309 (Bongdam-Gwacheon Urban Expressway) (Umyeonsan-ro); Taebong-ro; Gangnam Beltway	Seoul	Seocho District	Gyeonggi Province - Seoul border line
Yeomgok IC Connect Road	염곡 나들목 진입로	Yangjae-daero 12-gil	Seoul	Seocho District	
Truck Terminal	트럭터미널앞	Maeheon-ro	Seoul	Seocho District	
Yangjae IC	양재 나들목	Gyeongbu Expressway	Seoul	Seocho District	
Yeomgok IS (KOTRA) (Hyundai Motor Company)	염곡사거리 (대한무역투자진흥공사) (현대자동차)	Seoul City Route 41 (Gangnam-daero) (Heolleung-ro)	Seoul	Seocho District	
Korea Consumer Agency	한국소비자원		Seoul	Seocho District	
Guryongsa (Guryong Underpass)	구룡사앞 (구룡지하차도)	Nonhyeon-ro	Seoul	Gangnam District	
Guryong Tunnel IS	구룡터널 교차로	Bundang-Naegok Urban Expressway; Eonju-ro	Seoul	Gangnam District	
Guryongma-eul Entrance	구룡마을입구	Seolleung-ro; Yangjae-daero 16-gil	Seoul	Gangnam District	
Gaepo 3, 4 Complex IS	개포3,4단지 교차로	Samseong-ro	Seoul	Gangnam District	
Ilwon Tunnel IS	일원터널 교차로	Prefectural Route 23 (Yangjae-daero); Gwangpyeong-ro	Seoul	Gangnam District	Prefectural Route 23 overlap
Official pension shop	공무원연금매점	Yeongdong-daero 3-gil Yeongdong-daero 4-gil	Seoul	Gangnam District	Prefectural Route 23 overlap
Daemosan station (Gaewon Middle School)	대모산입구역 (개원중학교)	Gaepo-ro	Seoul	Gangnam District	Prefectural Route 23 overlap
Yeongdong 6 Bridge	영동6교		Seoul	Gangnam District	Prefectural Route 23 overlap
Hangnyeoul station (Seoul Trade Exhibition Center, SETEC)	학여울역 (서울무역전시컨벤션센터)	Nambu Beltway	Seoul	Gangnam District	Prefectural Route 23 overlap
Daechi Useong Apartment	대치우성아파트	Dogok-ro	Seoul	Gangnam District	Prefectural Route 23 overlap
Ottogi	오뚜기		Seoul	Gangnam District	Prefectural Route 23 overlap
Samseong station	삼성역	Teheran-ro	Seoul	Gangnam District	Prefectural Route 23 overlap
COEX World Trade Center Seoul (Trade Tower) Korea Electric Power Corporation	코엑스 한국종합무역센터 (트레이드 타워) 한국전력공사		Seoul	Gangnam District	Prefectural Route 23 overlap
COEX IS	코엑스 교차로	Bongeunsa-ro	Seoul	Gangnam District	Prefectural Route 23 overlap
Kyunggi High School (Cheongdam station)	경기고등학교앞 (청담역)	Hakdong-ro	Seoul	Gangnam District	Prefectural Route 23 overlap
South of Yeongdong Bridge	영동대교 남단	Dosan-daero; Olympic-daero	Seoul	Gangnam District	Prefectural Route 23 overlap
Yeongdong Bridge	영동대교		Seoul	Gangnam District	Prefectural Route 23 overlap
Yeongdong Bridge			Seoul	Gwangjin District	Prefectural Route 23 overlap
Yeongdong Bridge IC	영동대교북단 나들목	Gangbyeonbuk-ro (National Route 46) (Prefectural Route 23)	Seoul	Gwangjin District	Prefectural Route 23 overlap
Yeongdong Bridge IS (Yeongdong Bridge Overpass)	영동대교북단 교차로 (영동대교북단고가차도)	Ttukseom-ro	Seoul	Gwangjin District	
Seongsu IS	성수사거리	Achasan-ro	Seoul	Gwangjin District	
Hwayang IS	화양사거리	Gwangnaru-ro	Seoul	Gwangjin District	
Gunja Bridge IS (Gunja Underpass)	군자교 교차로 (군자지하차도)	National Route 3 (Cheonho-daero)	Seoul	Gwangjin District	National Route 3 overlap
Donggok IS	동곡삼거리	Gingorang-ro	Seoul	Gwangjin District	National Route 3 overlap
Jangpyeong Bridge IS	장평교 교차로	Dapsimni-ro	Seoul	Gwangjin District	National Route 3 overlap
Jangpyeong Bridge IS		Dapsimni-ro	Seoul	Jungnang District	National Route 3 overlap
Myeonmok Bridge IS	면목교 교차로	Myeonmokcheon-ro	Seoul	Jungnang District	National Route 3 overlap
Jangan Bridge IS	장안교사거리	Sagajeong-ro	Seoul	Jungnang District	National Route 3 overlap
Myeonmok 5-dong Community Center	면목5동주민센터		Seoul	Jungnang District	National Route 3 overlap
Myeonmok 2-dong IS	면목2동사거리	Gyeomjae-ro	Seoul	Jungnang District	National Route 3 overlap
Seoul Joongmok Elementary School	서울중목초등학교		Seoul	Jungnang District	National Route 3 overlap
Jungnang Telephone Office	중랑전화국 교차로	Bongujae-ro	Seoul	Jungnang District	National Route 3 overlap
Dong 1-ro Underpass IS	동1로지하차도 교차로	National Route 3 (Dongil-ro); National Route 6 (Mangu-ro)	Seoul	Jungnang District	National Route 3 overlap National Route 6 overlap
Sangbong IS (Sangbong station)	상봉삼거리 (상봉역)	Myeonmok-ro	Seoul	Jungnang District	National Route 6 overlap
Sangbong Underpass IS	상봉지하차도교차로	Sangbongjungang-ro	Seoul	Jungnang District	National Route 6 overlap
Mangu station IS	망우역교차로	Sangbong-ro	Seoul	Jungnang District	National Route 6 overlap
Sinnae Underpass IS	신내지하차도교차로	Sinnae-ro	Seoul	Jungnang District	National Route 6 overlap
Mangu IS	망우사거리	National Route 6 (Mangu-ro); Seoul City Route 71 (Yongmasan-ro)	Seoul	Jungnang District	National Route 6 overlap Seoul City Route 71 overlap
Neungsan Underpass	능산지하차도		Seoul	Jungnang District	Seoul City Route 71 overlap
Seoul Sinnae Elementary School	서울신내초등학교		Seoul	Jungnang District	Seoul City Route 71 overlap
Neungsan IS	능산삼거리	Bonghwasan-ro	Seoul	Jungnang District	Seoul City Route 71 overlap
Sinnae station	신내역		Seoul	Jungnang District	Seoul City Route 71 overlap
Sinnae IC	신내 나들목	Bukbu Expressway	Seoul	Jungnang District	Seoul City Route 71 overlap
Seoul Jungnang Police Station	서울중랑경찰서		Seoul	Jungnang District	Continuation into Gyeonggi Province

=== Gyeonggi Province (North of Seoul) ===
Name	Hangul name	Connection	Location		Note
Galmae station	갈매역		Guri City	Galmae-dong	Seoul - Gyeonggi Province border line
Galmae IS Byeollae station	갈매 교차로 별내역	Gyeongchunbuk-ro; Geumgang-ro	Guri City	Galmae-dong	
Galmae IC	갈매 나들목	Gyeongchunbuk-ro; Songsan-ro	Guri City	Galmae-dong	
Toegyewon IC	퇴계원 나들목	Seoul Ring Expressway	Guri City	Donggu-dong	
Sano IC	사노 나들목	National Route 43; National Route 46 (Donggureung-ro)	Guri City	Donggu-dong	National Route 43, National Route 46 overlap
Sano Bridge	사노교		Guri City	Donggu-dong	National Route 43, National Route 46 overlap
Sano Bridge			Namyangju City	Jingeon-eup	National Route 43, National Route 46 overlap
Jingwan IC	진관 나들목	National Route 46 (Gyeongchunbuk-ro)	Namyangju City	Jingeon-eup	National Route 43, National Route 46 overlap
Gujingwan IC	구진관 나들목	Prefectural Route 383 (Gyeongchunbuk-ro)	Namyangju City	Jingeon-eup	National Route 43 overlap
Sinwol IS	신월 교차로	Jingwan-ro 562beon-gil	Namyangju City	Jingeon-eup	National Route 43 overlap
Imsong IS	임송 교차로	Toegyewon-ro	Namyangju City	Jinjeop-eup	National Route 43 overlap
Naegok IC	내곡 나들목	National Route 43 (Jeondochi-ro)	Namyangju City	Jinjeop-eup	National Route 43 overlap
Naegok-ri Entrance	내곡리입구	Geumgang-ro 960beon-gil Geumgang-ro 961beon-gil	Namyangju City	Jinjeop-eup	
Naegok IS	내곡 교차로	Prefectural Route 98 (Namga-ro); Deoknae-ro	Namyangju City	Jinjeop-eup	Prefectural Route 98 overlap
Bamseom Amusement Park	밤섬유원지		Namyangju City	Jinjeop-eup	Prefectural Route 98 overlap
Naegak-ri Entrance	내각리입구	Naegak 1-ro	Namyangju City	Jinjeop-eup	Prefectural Route 98 overlap
Naegak IS	내각사거리	Geumgang-ro 1190beon-gil	Namyangju City	Jinjeop-eup	Prefectural Route 98 overlap
Janghyeon-ri Entrance	장현리입구	Janghyeon-ro	Namyangju City	Jinjeop-eup	Prefectural Route 98 overlap
Janghyeon IS	장현사거리	Prefectural Route 86 (Jingeononam-ro); Bonghyeon-ro	Namyangju City	Jinjeop-eup	Prefectural Route 98 overlap
Jinjeop-eup Office	진접읍사무소앞		Namyangju City	Jinjeop-eup	Prefectural Route 98 overlap
Janghyeon Intercity Bus Stop	장현시외버스정류장		Namyangju City	Jinjeop-eup	Prefectural Route 98 overlap
Jangseung Village Entrance	장승부락입구	Geumgang-ro 1573beon-gil Geumgang-ro 1576beon-gil	Namyangju City	Jinjeop-eup	Prefectural Route 98 overlap
Jinjeop Middle School	진접중학교		Namyangju City	Jinjeop-eup	Prefectural Route 98 overlap
Bupyeong Bridge	부평교	Gwangneungsumokwon-ro	Namyangju City	Jinjeop-eup	Prefectural Route 98 overlap
Gwangneungnae	광릉내	Gwangneungnae-ro; Jinbeol-ro	Namyangju City	Jinjeop-eup	Prefectural Route 98 overlap
Palya-ri Entrance	팔야리입구	Geumgang-ro 1845beon-gil	Namyangju City	Jinjeop-eup	Prefectural Route 98 overlap
Eumhyeon 2-ri IS	음현2리 교차로	Geumgang-ro 2110beon-gil	Pocheon City	Naechon-myeon	Prefectural Route 98 overlap
Eumhyeon 4-ri IS	음현4리 교차로	Geumgang-ro 2194beon-gil	Pocheon City	Naechon-myeon	Prefectural Route 98 overlap
Naechon Middle School	내촌중학교앞	Naechon-ro	Pocheon City	Naechon-myeon	Prefectural Route 98 overlap
Naechon Overpass	내촌육교	National Route 87; Prefectural Route 98; Prefectural Route 364 (Pocheon-ro)	Pocheon City	Naechon-myeon	Prefectural Route 98, 364 overlap
Gijangdae IS	기장대 교차로	Naechon-ro	Pocheon City	Naechon-myeon	Prefectural Route 364 overlap
Bearstown	베어스타운		Pocheon City	Naechon-myeon	Prefectural Route 364 overlap
Sohak 3-ri	소학3리	Geumgang-ro 2895beon-gil	Pocheon City	Naechon-myeon	Prefectural Route 364 overlap
Cheongdamma-eul Entrance	청담마을입구	Geumgang-ro 3029beon-gil	Pocheon City	Naechon-myeon	Prefectural Route 364 overlap
Seopa Checkpoint	서파검문소	Geumgang-ro 3211beon-gil	Pocheon City	Naechon-myeon	Prefectural Route 364 overlap
Seopa IS	서파 교차로	National Route 37; Prefectural Route 56; Prefectural Route 364 (Cheonggun-ro)	Pocheon City	Naechon-myeon	National Route 37 overlap Prefectural Route 56, 364 overlap
Bongsu IS	봉수 교차로	Bongsu-ro	Gapyeong County	Sang-myeon	National Route 37 overlap Prefectural Route 56 overlap
Unak IS	운악 교차로	Hwadong-ro	Pocheon City	Hwahyeon-myeon	National Route 37 overlap Prefectural Route 56 overlap
Hwahyeon Bridge	화현교		Pocheon City	Hwahyeon-myeon	National Route 37 overlap Prefectural Route 56 overlap
Hwahyeon IS	화현 교차로	Hwadong-ro	Pocheon City	Hwahyeon-myeon	National Route 37 overlap Prefectural Route 56 overlap
Seonchon IS	선촌 교차로		Pocheon City	Hwahyeon-myeon	National Route 37 overlap Prefectural Route 56 overlap
Ildong IS	일동 교차로	National Route 37 (Sinnyeongil-ro)	Pocheon City	Ildong-myeon	National Route 37 overlap Prefectural Route 56 overlap
Suip IS	수입 교차로	Prefectural Route 387 (Suip-ro)	Pocheon City	Ildong-myeon	Prefectural Route 56 overlap
Sinyeongok IS	신연곡삼거리	Hwadong-ro	Pocheon City	Idong-myeon	Prefectural Route 56 overlap
Jangam 1 Bridge Jangdong 2 Bridge	장암1교 장암2교		Pocheon City	Idong-myeon	Prefectural Route 56 overlap
Idong Tunnel	이동터널		Pocheon City	Idong-myeon	Prefectural Route 56 overlap Right tunnel: Approximately 275m Left tunnel: Approximately 320m
Jangam 3 Bridge	장암3교		Pocheon City	Idong-myeon	Prefectural Route 56 overlap Continuation into Gangwon Province
Idong IS	이동 교차로	Prefectural Route 78 (Yeougogae-ro)	Pocheon City	Idong-myeon	Prefectural Route 56 overlap Continuation into Gangwon Province
Dopyeong IS	도평 교차로	Prefectural Route 372 (Hwadong-ro)	Pocheon City	Idong-myeon	Prefectural Route 56 overlap Continuation into Gangwon Province
Ildangogae	일단고개		Pocheon City	Idong-myeon	Prefectural Route 56 overlap Continuation into Gangwon Province
Jadeunghyeon (Jadeunggogae)	자등현 (자등고개)		Pocheon City	Idong-myeon	Prefectural Route 56 overlap Continuation into Gangwon Province

=== Gangwon Province ===
Name	Hangul name	Connection	Location		Note
Jadeunghyeon (Jadeunggogae)	자등현 (자등고개)		Cheorwon County	Seo-myeon	Prefectural Route 56 overlap Gyeonggi Province - Gangwon Province border line
(Jadeung-ri)	(자등리)	Prefectural Route 463; Prefectural Route 56 (Taebong-ro)	Cheorwon County	Seo-myeon	
Seomyeon Elementary School	서면초등학교		Cheorwon County	Seo-myeon	
Wasu Elementary School	와수초등학교		Cheorwon County	Seo-myeon	
(Wasu Rotary)	(와수로터리)	Wasu-ro	Cheorwon County	Seo-myeon	
Wasu Intercity Bus Terminal	와수시외버스터미널		Cheorwon County	Seo-myeon	
No name	(이름 없음)	Wasu 1-ro	Cheorwon County	Seo-myeon	
Gimhwa Middle School Gimhwa Technical High School Gimhwa High School Gimhwa Girls' Middle School	김화중학교 김화공업고등학교 김화고등학교 김화여자중학교		Cheorwon County	Seo-myeon	
Hakpo Bridge	학포교		Cheorwon County	Seo-myeon	
Hakpo Bridge			Cheorwon County	Gimhwa-eup	
Gimhwa IS	김화 교차로	National Route 43 (Hoguk-ro)	Cheorwon County	Gimhwa-eup	Terminus
