= Olympic-daero =

Road in South Korea

Seoul Special Metropolitan City Route 88
- 서울특별시도 제88호선
- Olympic Expressway 올림픽대로

Route information
- Length: 40.67 km (25.27 mi)
- Existed: 1986–present

Major junctions
- West end: Gangseo, Seoul (Haengju Bridge); Gimpo International Airport
- Incheon International Airport Expressway; Seobu Urban Expressway; National Route 6 National Route 46; Gyeongbu Expressway ( AH 1); Dongbu Urban Expressway; National Route 3 National Route 43
- East end: Gangdong, Seoul (Gangdong Bridge); Seoul Ring Expressway

Location
- Country: South Korea

Highway system
- Highway systems of South Korea; Expressways; National; Local

- Olympic-daero
- Hangul: 올림픽대로
- Hanja: 올림픽大路
- Literal meaning: 1988 Olympic Blvd Expressway
- Revised Romanization: Olrimpik Daero
- McCune–Reischauer: Olrimpik Taero

Olympic-daero from above, 2019

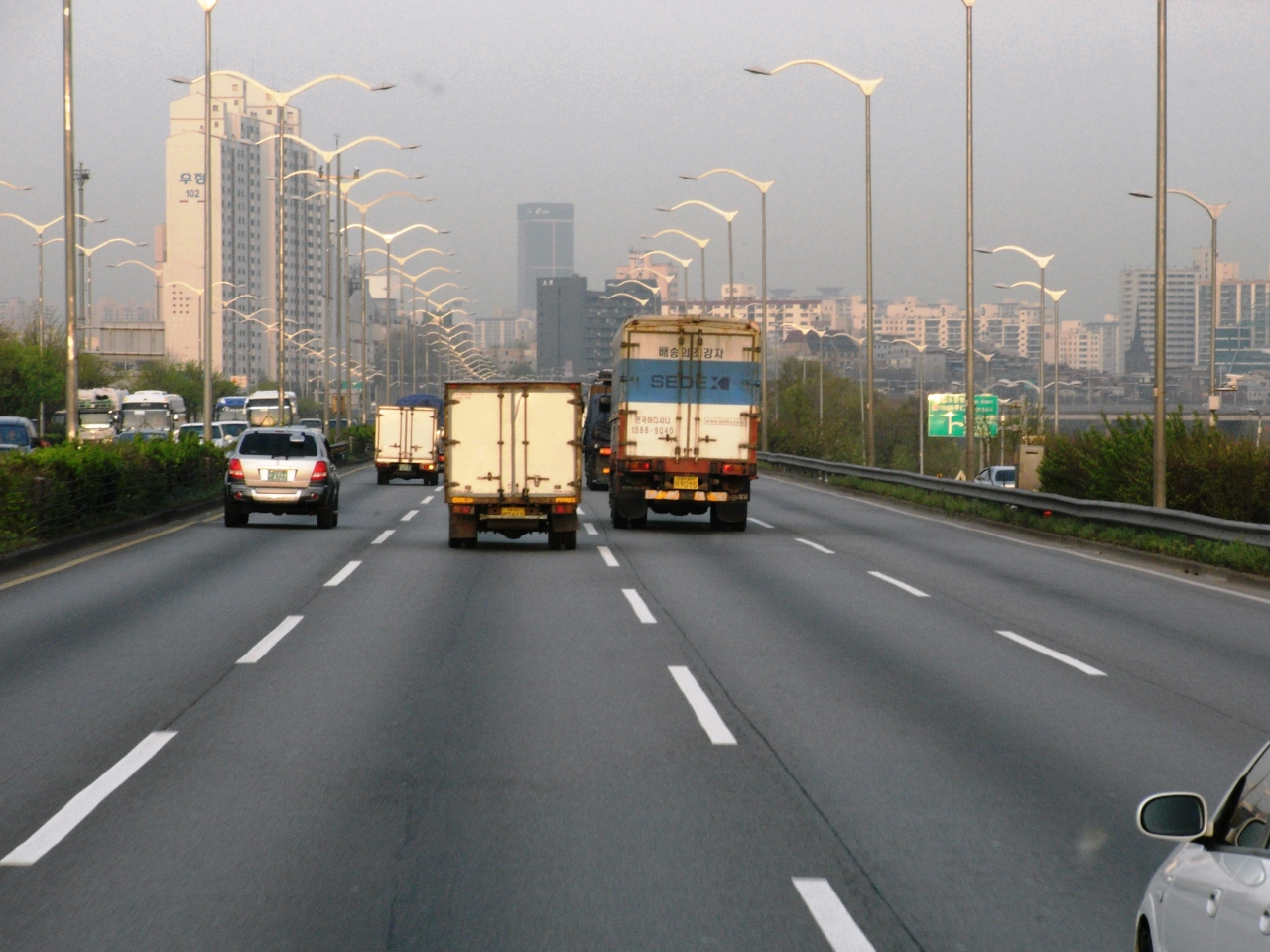
Olympic Blvd Expressway

The Olympic-daero (also called Olympic Blvd Korean: 올림픽대로; Olrimpik Daero) is 8-lane highway located in Seoul, South Korea.

This route connects Seoul to Gimpo, Hanam and Gimpo International Airport, with a total length of 40.67 km (25.27 mi)

This highway is a main route of Seoul, especially on the southern part of the Han River, and is connected directly with Gimpo Hangang Highway (West), and Seoul-Yangyang Expressway (East).

== History ==
This Highway was built between 1982 and 1986 for the 1988 Summer Olympics.

- 1982 : Beginning of Construction.
- May 2, 1986 : Opened to traffic.

== List of facilities ==
- IC: Interchange, JC: Junction, SA: Service Area, TG:Tollgate

No.	Name	Korean name	Hanja name	Connections	Notes	Location	
Connected directly with Gimpo Hangang Highway(김포한강로)
IC	Gaehwa IC (Haengju Br.)	개화나들목	開花나들목	National Route 39; Gimpo International Airport; Gaehwa station	Highway Start Spot	Gangseo	Seoul
JC	88 JC (Banghwa Br.)	88분기점	88分岐點	Incheon International Airport Expressway; Suwon-Munsan Expressway(2021); Sinbanghwa station		Gangseo	Seoul
IC	Gayang Br. IC	가양대교남단	加陽大橋	Hwagok-ro(화곡로)		Gangseo	Seoul
IC	Yeomchang IC	염창나들목	鹽倉	National Route 6 National Route 48; National Route 77; Anyangcheon-ro; Yangcheon-ro; Hyperion Tower; Mokdong Stadium		Gangseo	Seoul
IC	World Cup Br. IC	월드컵대교남단	월드컵大橋			Gangseo	Seoul
IC	Seongsan Br. IC	성산대교남단	城山大橋	National Route 1 (Seobu Urban Expressway); National Route 6 National Route 48; National Route 77 ( Seohaean Expressway) ( Gyeongin Expressway)		Yeongdeungpo	Seoul
IC	Yeoui-downstream IC	여의하류나들목	汝矣下流나들목	Nodeul-ro(노들로); Yeouiseo-ro(여의서로); Nat'l Assembly Hall; IFC Seoul; FKI Tower		Yeongdeungpo	Seoul
IC	Yeoui-upstream IC	여의상류나들목	汝矣上流나들목	Nodeul-ro(노들로); Yeouidong-ro(여의동로); 63 Building		Dongjak	Seoul
IC	Dongjak Br. IC	동작대교남단	銅雀大橋	Dongjakdaero(동작대로); Hyeonchung-ro(현충로)	Gaehwa-bound Only	Dongjak	Seoul
IC	Banpo Br. IC	반포대교남단	盤浦大橋	Banpodaero(반포대로)		Dongjak	Seoul
JC	Hannam JC	한남분기점	漢南分岐點	Gangnam-daero(강남대로) ( Gyeongbu Expressway( AH 1)); Sinsa station		Gangnam	Seoul
IC	Dongho Br. IC	동호대교남단	東湖大橋	Nonhyeon-ro(논현로); Apgujeong station		Gangnam	Seoul
IC	Seongsu Br. IC	성수대교남단	聖水大橋	Eonju-ro(언주로)		Gangnam	Seoul
IC	Yeongdong Br. IC	영동대교남단	永東大橋	National Route 47 (Yeongdongdaero/영동대로); Dosandaero(도산대로)		Gangnam	Seoul
IC	Cheongdam Br. IC	청담대교남단	淸潭大橋	Dongbu Urban Expressway (동부간선도로)		Gangnam	Seoul
IC	Cheongdam IC	청담나들목	淸潭나들목	Tancheondong-ro(탄천동로); Bongeunsa-ro(봉은사로); World Trade Center Seoul; COEX	Gangil-bound Only	Songpa	Seoul
IC	Sports Compx. IC	종합운동장나들목	綜合運動場나들목	Baekjegobun-ro(백제고분로); Hangaram-ro(한가람로); Seoul Sports Complex		Songpa	Seoul
IC	Jamsil Br. IC	잠실대교남단	蠶室大橋	National Route 3 (Jamsil-daero/잠실대로); Lotte World Mall		Songpa	Seoul
IC	Olympic Br. IC	올림픽대교남단	올림픽大橋	Gangdong-daero(강동대로)		Songpa	Seoul
IC	Cheonho Br. IC (Gwangjin Br.)	천호대교남단 (광진교)	千戶大橋 (光津橋)	National Route 43 (Cheon-daero/천호대로)		Songpa	Seoul
IC	Amsa IC	암사나들목	岩寺나들목	Yangjae-daero; Guri-Amsa Bridge		Gangdong	Seoul
JC	Gangdong Godeok IC (Guri-Topyeong Br.)	강동고덕나들목	江東高德나들목	Sejong-Pocheon Expressway		Gangdong	Seoul
JC	Gangil JC (Gangdong Br.)	강일분기점	江一分岐點	Seoul Ring Expressway		Gangdong	Seoul
Connected directly with Seoul-Yangyang Expressway

== See also ==
- List of streets in Seoul
- Gangbyeonbuk-ro
