= Bundang-Naegok Urban Expressway =

- 분당내곡도시고속도로

Route information
- Length: 7.9 km (4.9 mi)
- Existed: 1994–present

Major junctions
- South end: Bundang District, Seongnam, Gyeonggi Province
- North end: Sujeong District, Seongnam, Gyeonggi Province

Location
- Country: South Korea

Highway system
- Highway systems of South Korea; Expressways; National; Local

The Bundang-Naegok Urban Expressway (Korean: 분당내곡도시고속도로; Bundang Naegok Dosi Gosok Doro), is an urban expressway in South Korea, connecting Bundang-gu to Sujeong-gu in Seongnam, Gyeonggi Province.

== Main stopovers ==
Gyeonggi Province

- Seongnam (Bundang-gu - Sujeong-gu)

== Composition ==
- Notes
  - IC : Interchange
  - IS : Intersection
  - BR : Bridge
  - TN : Tunnel

Type	Name	Korean name	Connection	Location		Notes
Directly connected with Sunae-ro
IS	Sunae IS	수내사거리	Bundang-Suseo Urban Expressway	Seongnam	Bundang District	
IS	Baekhyeon IS	백현사거리	Dongpangyo-ro	Seongnam	Bundang District	Gwangyang Underpass section
IS	Gwangyang-ro IS	광장로사거리	Local Route 57 (Seohyeon-ro)	Seongnam	Bundang District	Gwangyang Underpass section
IS	(Unnamed)	(명칭 미상)	Pangyoyeok-ro 146beon-gil	Seongnam	Bundang District	Gwangyang Underpass section
IS	Pangyo Station IS	판교역사거리	Daewangpangyo-ro 606beon-gil	Seongnam	Bundang District	Gwangyang Underpass section
IS	Botdeul Bridge IS	봇들교사거리	Pangyoyeok-ro 192beon-gil Dongpangyo-ro 177beon-gil	Seongnam	Bundang District	Gwangyang Underpass section
IS	Sampyeong IS	삼평사거리	Daewangpangyo-ro 644beon-gil	Seongnam	Bundang District	Gwangyang Underpass section
IS	Botdeul IS	봇들사거리	Pangyo-ro	Seongnam	Bundang District	Gwangyang Underpass section
TN	Saspong Underpass	사송지하차도		Seongnam	Bundang District	
TN	Saspong Underpass			Seongnam	Sujeong District	
TN	Songhyeon Underpass	송현지하차도		Seongnam	Sujeong District	
IC	East Pangyo IC	동판교 나들목	2nd Gyeongin Expressway	Seongnam	Sujeong District	
IS	Siheung IS	시흥사거리	Local Route 23 (Daewangpangyo-ro); Yeosu-daero	Seongnam	Sujeong District	Sinpheung Underpass section
BR	Sangjeok Bridge	상적교		Seongnam	Sujeong District	
TN	Naegok Tunnel	내곡터널		Seongnam	Sujeong District	L= 1,059m
Connected with Eonju-ro

== See also ==
- Roads and expressways in South Korea
- Transportation in South Korea
