= Haengju Bridge =

Bridge in Seoul, South Korea

Coordinates: 37.59797°N 126.80952°E

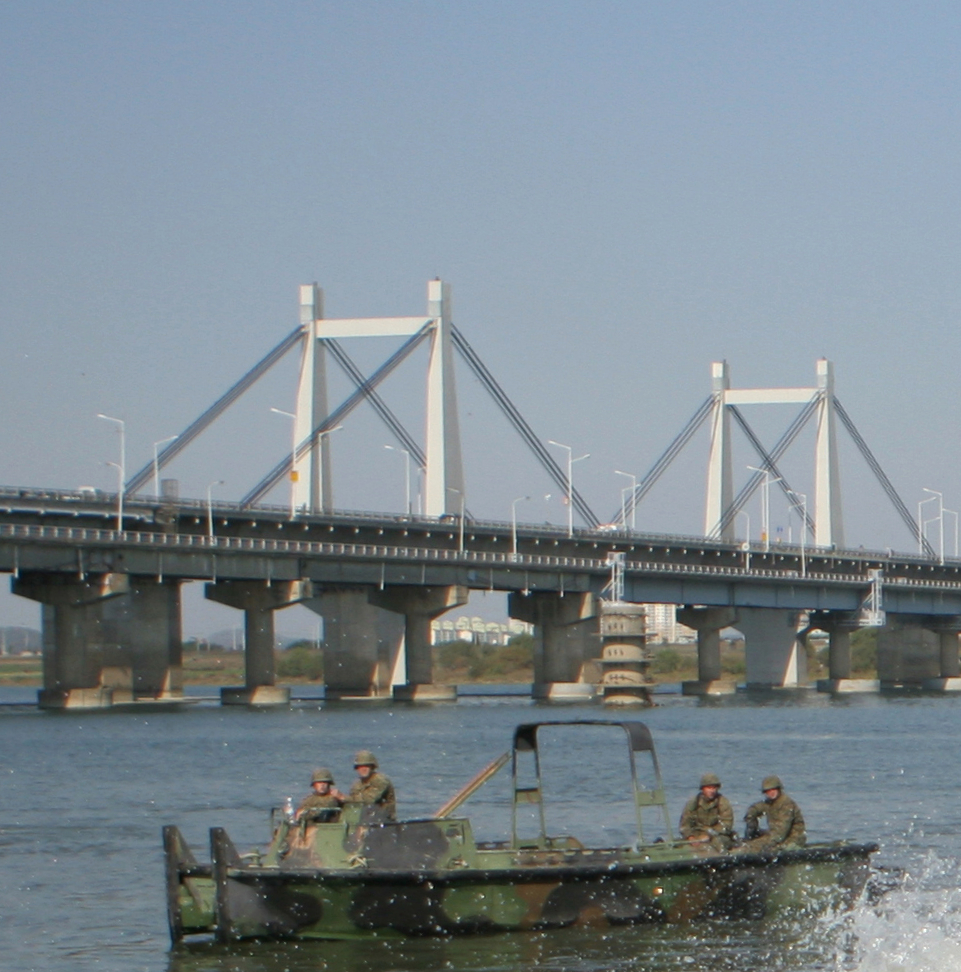
- Haengju Bridge in 2005

Korean name
- Hangul: 행주대교
- Hanja: 幸州大橋
- RR: Haengju daegyo
- MR: Haengju taegyo

The second Haengju Bridge collapsed during construction in 1992

The Haengju Bridge (Korean: 행주대교) crosses the Han River in South Korea and connects the city of Goyang and the Gangseo District, Seoul. The bridge was first completed in 1978, but the bridge was very narrow and could not handle the increased traffic as the neighboring cities of Ilsan and Bucheon experienced housing booms.

Construction of the second bridge (called the New Haengju Bridge) adjacent to the original began in October 1987. During construction in 1992, the new bridge collapsed. Repairs took three more years, and the bridge opened in 1995.

Construction on a third bridge began in the space between the first and the second in 1996 and finished in December 2000. With the completion of the third bridge, the first bridge was closed. Currently, the second bridge handles southward traffic and the third bridge handles northward traffic.
