= National Route 48 (South Korea) =

Road in South Korea

National Route 48
- 국도 제48호선

Route information
- Length: 68.0 km (42.3 mi)
- Existed: 31 August 1971–present

Major junctions
- West end: Ganghwa County, Incheon
- East end: Jongno District, Seoul

Location
- Country: South Korea

Highway system
- Highway systems of South Korea; Expressways; National; Local

National Route 48 is a national highway in South Korea connects Ganghwa County to Jongno District. It established on 31 August 1971.

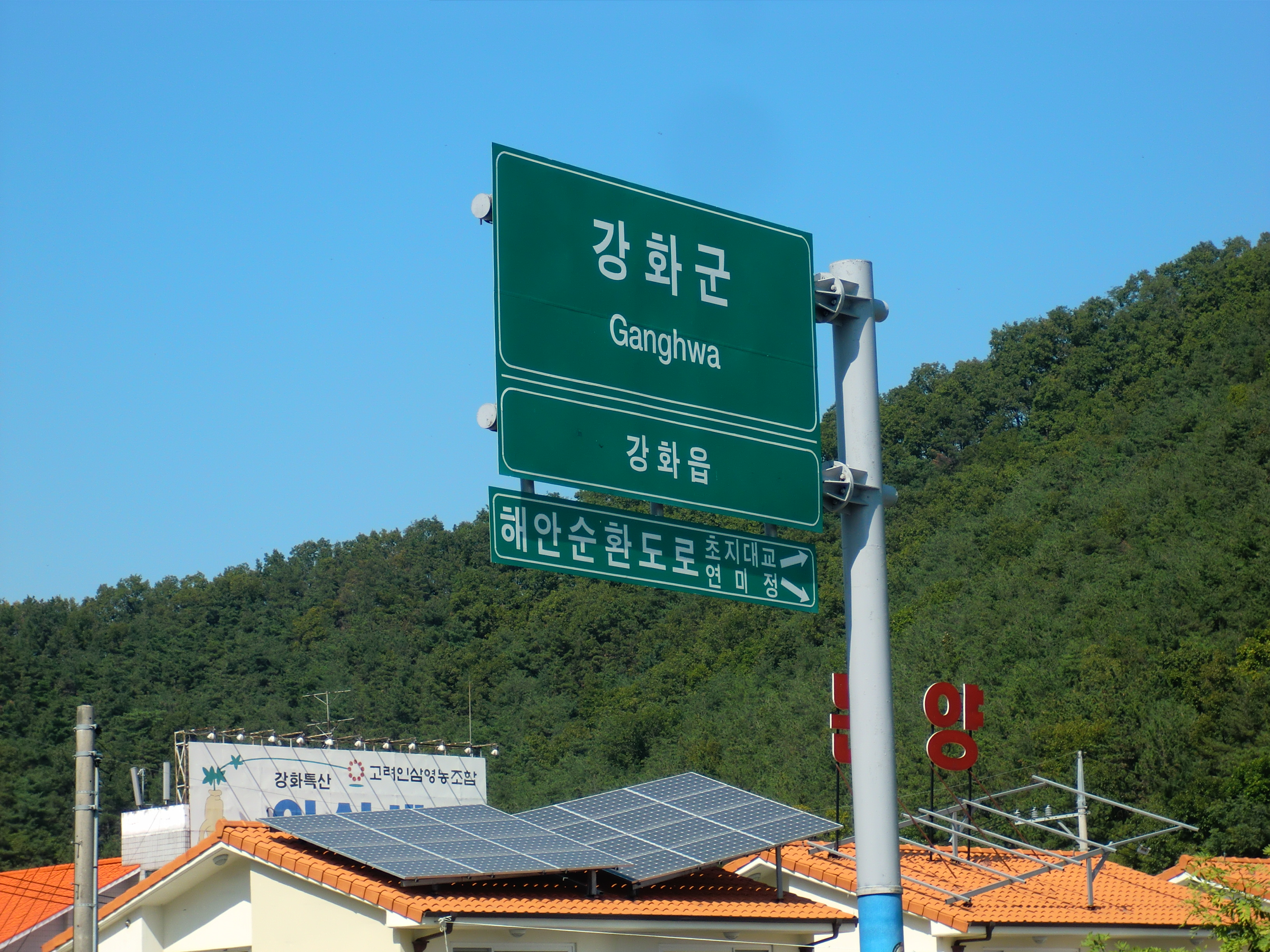
Ganghwa-eup sign on Gyeonggi-Incheon boundary

== Main stopovers ==
Incheon

- Ganghwa County

Gyeonggi Province

- Gimpo

Seoul

- Gangseo District - Yeongdeungpo District - Mapo District - Seodaemun District - Jongno District

== Major intersections ==
- (■): Motorway

IS: Intersection, IC: Interchange

=== Incheon (Ganghwa County) ===
Name	Hangul name	Connection	Location		Note
Inhwa-ri	인화리		Ganghwa County	Yangsa-myeon	Terminus
Songsan IS	송산삼거리		Ganghwa County	Yangsa-myeon	
Baeu Pass	배우고개		Ganghwa County	Yangsa-myeon	
Igang IS	이강삼거리	Ganghwaseo-ro	Ganghwa County	Hajeom-myeon	
Sinbong IS	신봉삼거리	Bongdeok-ro	Ganghwa County	Hajeom-myeon	
Hajeom-myeon Office Hajeom Elementary School	하점면사무소 하점초등학교		Ganghwa County	Hajeom-myeon	
Ganghwa History Museum Ganghwa dolmen	강화역사박물관 강화지석묘		Ganghwa County	Hajeom-myeon	
Songhae IS	송해삼거리	Jeonmang-daero	Ganghwa County	Songhae-myeon	
Incheon Asian Games Ganghwa Stadium	인천아시안게임강화경기장		Ganghwa County	Ganghwa-eup	
Seomun IS Ganghwasanseong East Gate	서문삼거리 강화산성서문	Gobigogae-ro	Ganghwa County	Ganghwa-eup	
Sinmun IS	신문사거리	Hyangnamu-gil 31beon-gil	Ganghwa County	Ganghwa-eup	
Ganghwa County Office Entrance	강화군청입구		Ganghwa County	Ganghwa-eup	
Suhyeop IS	수협사거리	Nammun-ro; Dongmun-ro	Ganghwa County	Ganghwa-eup	
Almigol IS	알미골사거리	Prefectural Route 84 (Jungang-ro)	Ganghwa County	Ganghwa-eup	
Ganghwa Hospital IS Ganghwa Registration Office	강화병원삼거리 강화등기소		Ganghwa County	Ganghwa-eup	
Ganghwa Bridge IS	강화대교 교차로	Haeandong-do 136beon-gil	Ganghwa County	Ganghwa-eup	
Ganghwa Bridge	강화대교		Ganghwa County	Ganghwa-eup	Continuation into Gyeonggi Province

=== Gyeonggi Province Gimpo ===
Name	Hangul name	Connection	Location		Note
Ganghwa Bridge	강화대교		Gimpo City	Wolgot-myeon	Incheon - Gyeonggi Province border line
Seongdongma-eul Entrance Seongdong Checkpoint IS	성동마을입구 성동검문소 교차로	Munsusan-ro; Gimpo-daero 3023beon-gil	Gimpo City	Wolgot-myeon	
Kimpo University Entrance	김포대학입구	Gimpodaehak-ro	Gimpo City	Wolgot-myeon	
Gimpo CC IS	김포CC 교차로	Prefectural Route 56 (Gunha-ro)	Gimpo City	Wolgot-myeon	
Galsan IS	갈산사거리	Gunha-ro	Gimpo City	Wolgot-myeon	
Gimpo Foreign Language High School	김포외국어고등학교		Gimpo City	Wolgot-myeon	
Olijeong Entrance Galsan IS	오리정입구 갈산삼거리		Gimpo City	Wolgot-myeon	
Saeteoma-eul IS Ongjeong IS	새터마을교차로 옹정삼거리	Gimpo-daero 2435beon-gil	Gimpo City	Tongjin-eup	
Masong Bypass Road IS	마송우회도로사거리	Yulsaengmasonggan-ro	Gimpo City	Tongjin-eup	
Tongjin High School Masongsinae Entrance (Masong Underpass)	통진중고사거리 마송시내입구 (마송지하차도)	Jogang-ro	Gimpo City	Tongjin-eup	
Masong Elementary School IS	마송초교 교차로	Prefectural Route 355 (Seoamgojeong-ro) (Heungsin-ro)	Gimpo City	Tongjin-eup	
Dosa 4-ri Doso-dong IS Baekseokma-eul Dosa 5-ri	도사4리 도소동교차로 백석마을 도사5리		Gimpo City	Tongjin-eup	
West Gimpo-Tongjin IS (West Gimpo-Tongjin IC)	서김포통진 교차로 (서김포통진 나들목)	Capital Region 2nd Ring Expressway	Gimpo City	Yangchon-eup	
Haseong IS	하성삼거리	Haseong-ro	Gimpo City	Yangchon-eup	
Rusan Bridge	루산교		Gimpo City	Yangchon-eup	
Nusan IS	누산삼거리	Gimpo-daero 1759beon-gil	Gimpo City	Yangchon-eup	
Nusan IS	누산 교차로	Prefectural Route 356 (Yanggok-ro)	Gimpo City	Yangchon-eup	
Seoksan Entrance IS	석산입구 교차로	Gimpo-daero 1685beon-gil	Gimpo City	Yangchon-eup	
Balsan-ri IS	발산리 교차로	Nusan-ro	Gimpo City	Yangchon-eup	
Daechon Jechonma-eul Entrance	대촌제촌마을입구	Unyang-ro	Gimpo City	Janggi-dong	
Janggibon-dong Community Service Center	장기본동행정복지센터	Cheongsong-ro	Gimpo City	Janggi-dong	Janggi Underpass
Hangang-ro IS	한강로사거리	Gimpohangang 1-ro	Gimpo City	Janggi-dong	Janggi Underpass
Janggi IS	장기사거리	Gimpohangang 2-ro	Gimpo City	Janggi-dong	Janggi Underpass
Janggi IS	장기 교차로	Gimpo-daero; Taejang-ro	Gimpo City	Janggi-dong	Janggi Underpass
Geolpo IC	걸포 나들목	Prefectural Route 98; Prefectural Route 356 (Ilsan Bridge)	Gimpo City	Gimpobon-dong	
Hyangsan IS	향산 교차로	Sangmi-ro	Gimpo City	Gochon-eup	
Taeri IS	태리 교차로	Gimpo-daero	Gimpo City	Gochon-eup	
Janggok IS	장곡 교차로	Janggok-ro	Gimpo City	Gochon-eup	
Cheondeung IS	천등 교차로	Singok-ro	Gimpo City	Gochon-eup	
Singok IS	신곡사거리	Inhyang-ro	Gimpo City	Gochon-eup	
Gimpo IC	김포 나들목	Seoul Ring Expressway	Gimpo City	Gochon-eup	
Gimpo Ara Bridge	김포아라대교		Gimpo City	Gochon-eup	
Gochon IC	고촌 나들목	National Route 39 (Beolmal-ro)	Gimpo City	Gochon-eup	Continuation into Seoul

=== Seoul ===
Name	Hangul name	Connection	Location		Note
Sangsama-eul	상사마을	Seoul City Route 92 (Gaehwadong-ro)	Seoul	Gangseo District	Seoul City Route 92 overlap Gyeonggi Province - Seoul border line
Gaehwa station Entrance	개화역입구	Gaehwadong-ro 8-gil	Seoul	Gangseo District	Seoul City Route 92 overlap
Gaehwa IS (Gimpo Airport IC)	개화사거리 (김포공항 나들목)	Incheon International Airport Expressway; Yangcheon-ro	Seoul	Gangseo District	Seoul City Route 92 overlap
Gimpo Airport IS (Gaehwa-dong Underpass)	김포공항 교차로 (개화동지하차도)	Chowon-ro	Seoul	Gangseo District	Seoul City Route 92 overlap
Banghwa Middle School	방화중학교		Seoul	Gangseo District	Seoul City Route 92 overlap
Gimpo Airport Entrance IS (Airport Underpass)	김포공항입구교차로 (공항지하차도)	Gimpo International Airport (Haneul-gil); Seoul City Route 92 (Nambu Beltway); Banghwadong-ro	Seoul	Gangseo District	Seoul City Route 92 overlap
Songjeong station	송정역		Seoul	Gangseo District	
Magok station IS	마곡역교차로	National Route 6 National Route 77 (Balsan-ro)	Seoul	Gangseo District	National Route 6, National Route 77 overlap
Balsan station IS	발산역교차로	Gangseo-ro	Seoul	Gangseo District	National Route 6, National Route 77 overlap
Saemaul Sports Hall	kbs스포츠월드		Seoul	Gangseo District	National Route 6, National Route 77 overlap
Gangseo District Office IS	강서구청입구 교차로	Hwagok-ro	Seoul	Gangseo District	National Route 6, National Route 77 overlap
Deungchon Middle School Seoul Baekseok Elementary School National Information Society Agency Korea Electric Power Corporation	등촌중학교 서울백석초등학교 한국정보화진흥원 한국전기공사협회		Seoul	Gangseo District	National Route 6, National Route 77 overlap
Deungchon station IS	등촌역교차로	Gonghang-daero 59-gil Deungchon-ro	Seoul	Yangcheon District	National Route 6, National Route 77 overlap
Yeomchang station Yanghwa Bridge	염창역 양화교		Seoul	Yangcheon District	National Route 6, National Route 77 overlap
Seongsan Bridge IS	성산대교남단교차로	National Route 1 (Seobu Ganseondoro); National Route 6 National Route 77 (Nodeul-ro)	Seoul	Yeongdeungpo District	National Route 1 overlap
Seongsan Bridge	성산대교		Seoul	Yeongdeungpo District	National Route 1 overlap
Seongsan Bridge			Seoul	Mapo District	National Route 1 overlap
Seongsan Bridge IS	성산대교북단교차로	National Route 77 (Gangbyeonbuk-ro)	Seoul	Mapo District	National Route 1 overlap
Naebusunhwan-ro Entrance (Seongsan Underpass)	내부순환로입구 (성산지하차도)	National Route 1 (Nongsusansijang-ro); Naebu Expressway	Seoul	Mapo District	National Route 1 overlap
Mapo-gu Office station IS	마포구청역사거리	World Cup-ro	Seoul	Mapo District	
Seongsan 2 Bridge IS	성산2교사거리	World cup buk-ro	Seoul	Mapo District	
Yeonnam Bridge IS	연남교 교차로	Seongam-ro; Yeonnam-ro	Seoul	Mapo District	Moraenae Overpass
Sacheon Bridge IS	사천교 교차로	Susaek-ro	Seoul	Seodaemun District	Moraenae Overpass
Yeonhui IC	연희나들목	Yeonhui-ro	Seoul	Seodaemun District	
Yonsei University	연세대학교	Yonsei-ro	Seoul	Seodaemun District	
Severance Hospital Sinchon station	신촌세브란스병원 지상 신촌역		Seoul	Seodaemun District	
Ewha Womans University	이화여자대학교		Seoul	Seodaemun District	
Bongwon Overpass	봉원고가차도		Seoul	Seodaemun District	
Geumhwa Tunnel	금화터널		Seoul	Seodaemun District	Approximately 535m
Dongnimmun station (Dongnimmun Overpass)	독립문역사거리 (독립문고가차도)	Tongil-ro	Seoul	Seodaemun District	
Sajik Tunnel	사직터널		Seoul	Jongno District	Approximately 160m
Sajik Park Sajik-dong Community Center	사직공원 사직동주민센터	Sajik-ro 8-gil	Seoul	Jongno District	
Gyeongbokgung station IS	경복궁역사거리	Saemunan-ro 3-gil Jahamun-ro	Seoul	Jongno District	
Gwanghwamun IS Central Government Complex (Seoul)	광화문교차로 정부서울청사	Yulgok-ro	Seoul	Jongno District	
Gwanghwamun station Sejong Center	광화문역 세종문화회관		Seoul	Jongno District	
Sejong-daero IS	세종대로사거리	National Route 6 (Saemunan-ro, Jong-ro); Sejong-daero	Seoul	Jongno District	Terminus
