= Sookmyung Women's University station =

Station of the Seoul Metropolitan Subway

Coordinates: 37.54456°N 126.97213°E

숙대입구 (서울시교육청); Sookmyung Women's Univ. (Seoul Metropolitan Office of Education)
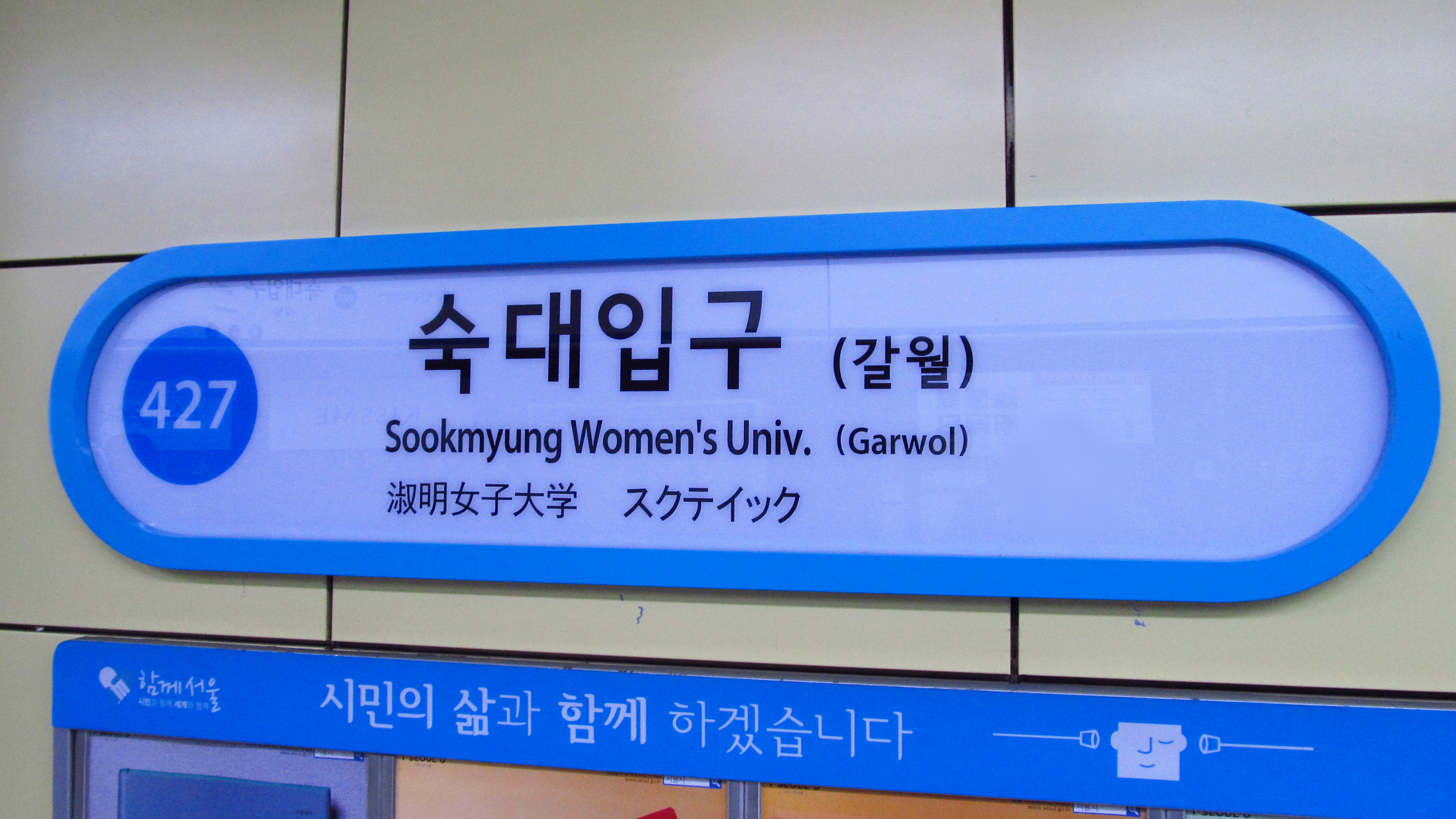
- Station Sign

Korean name
- Hangul: 숙대입구역
- Hanja: 淑大入口驛
- Revised Romanization: Sukdaeipgu-yeok
- McCune–Reischauer: Suktaeipku-yŏk

General information
- Location: 306 Hangang-daero, 101 Garwol-dong, Yongsan-gu, Seoul
- Operator: Seoul Metro
- Line: Line 4
- Platforms: 2
- Tracks: 2

Construction
- Structure type: Underground

Key dates
- October 18, 1985: Line 4 opened
Location

Sookmyung Women's University Station is subway station 427, on the Seoul Subway Line 4 in Yongsan-gu, Seoul. The station has the subname Seoul Metropolitan Office of Education (서울시교육청). It is located in front of the main entrance of the Sookmyung Women's University. There are many restaurants in the neighborhood of the subway station.

Though not connected by transfer, Sookmyung Women's University Station is only a two- to three-minute walk from Namyeong station on Line 1.

== Station layout ==
G	Street level	Exit

L1; Concourse	Lobby	Customer Service, Shops, Vending machines, ATMs

L2; Platforms	Side platform, doors will open on the right
L2; Platforms	Northbound	← Line 4 toward Jinjeop (Seoul Station)
L2; Platforms	Southbound	Line 4 toward Oido (Samgakji) →
L2; Platforms	Side platform, doors will open on the right

Preceding station	Seoul Metropolitan Subway	Following station
Seoul Station towards Jinjeop	Line 4	Samgakji towards Oido
