= Namyeong station =

Metro station on Seoul Subway Line 1

남영 (민주화운동기념관); Namyeong (Nat'l Museum of Korean Democracy)
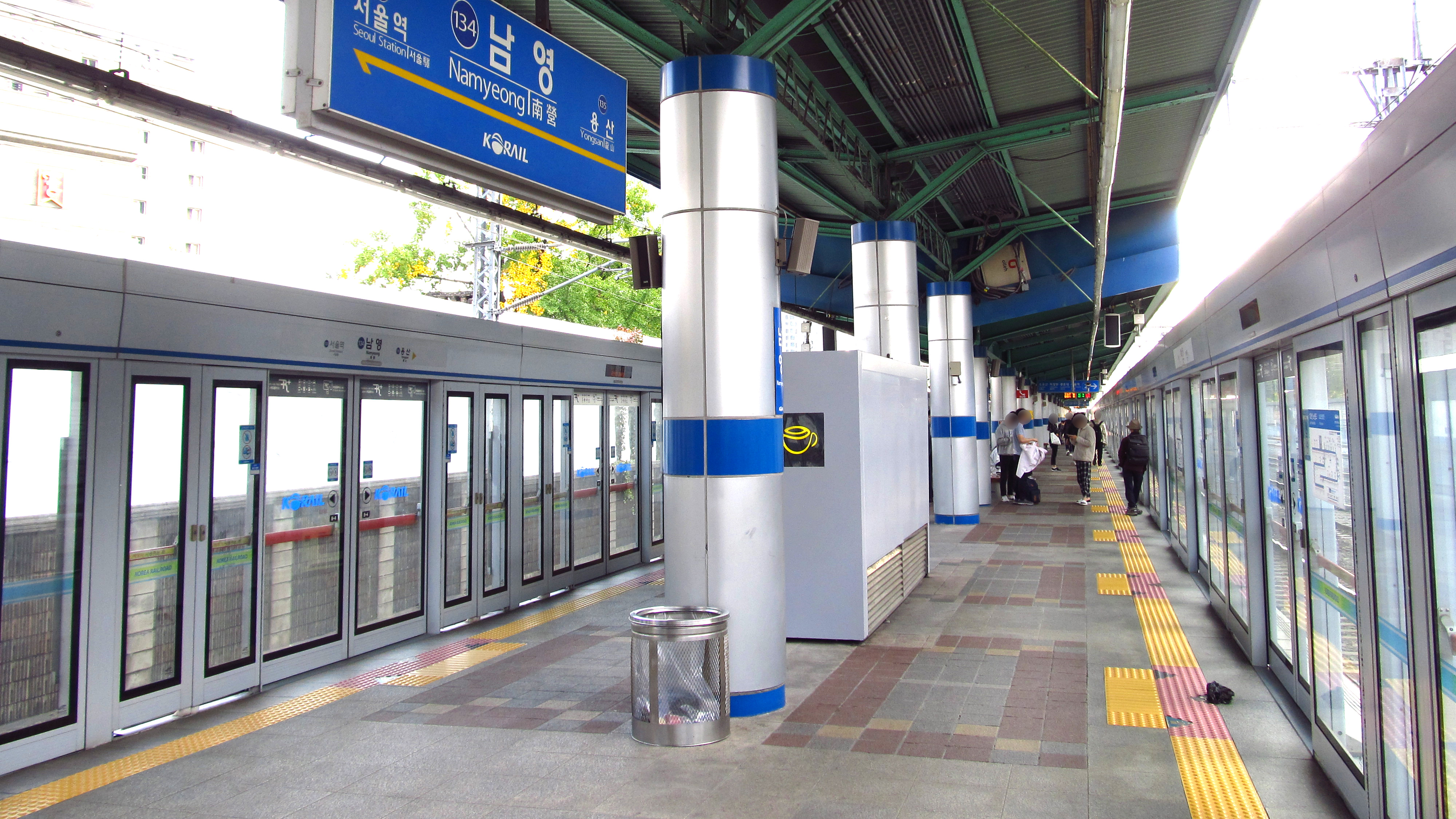

Korean name
- Hangul: 남영역
- Hanja: 南營驛
- RR: Namyeong-yeok
- MR: Namyŏng-yŏk

General information
- Location: 96-1 Garwol-dong, 25 Hangang-daero 77 gil, Yongsan-gu, Seoul
- Coordinates: 37°32′26″N 126°58′17″E
- Operator: Korail
- Line: Gyeongbu Line
- Platforms: 1
- Tracks: 2

Construction
- Structure type: Aboveground

History
- Opened: August 15, 1974

Passengers
- (Daily) Based on Jan-Dec of 2012. Line 1: 23,526
Services
Preceding station	Seoul Metropolitan Subway	Following station
Seoul Station towards Kwangwoon University or Yeoncheon	Line 1	Yongsan towards Incheon, Seodongtan or Sinchang
Seoul Station towards Dongducheon	Line 1 Gyeongwon Express	Yongsan towards Incheon
Seoul Station towards Cheongnyangni	Line 1 Gyeongbu Express	Yongsan towards Sinchang
Location

Namyeong station is a ground-level metro station on Seoul Subway Line 1 in Galwol Dong, Yongsan-gu, Seoul, South Korea. Subways of Line 1 move on Gyeongbu Line from this station. The station's sole exit offers access to a range of schools and Yongsan Railway Office. Travel time from Namyeong Station to Incheon on Line 1 is 65 minutes.

Though not connected by transfer, Namyeong station is only a two- to three-minute walk from Sookmyung Women's University station or Samgakji station on Line 4 and Line 6. (Only for Samgakji station) (Line 6)

== History ==
Namyeong station opened on August 15, 1974, with services on Line 1 to Incheon and Suwon.
