= Seoul City Route 21 (Trunk) =

Road in South Korea

Seoul Special Metropolitan City Route 21
- 서울특별시도 제21호선
- Siheung - Jungnim Line

Route information
- Length: 17.7 km (11.0 mi)

Major junctions
- From: Geumcheon District, Seoul
- To: Jung District, Seoul

Location
- Country: South Korea

Highway system
- Highway systems of South Korea; Expressways; National; Local

Seoul Metropolitan City Route 21 (Korean: 서울특별시도 제21호선) is a road located in Seoul, South Korea. With a total length of 17.7 km (11.0 mi), this road starts from the Siheung-dong in Geumcheon District, Seoul to Jungnim-dong in Jung District.

== Stopovers ==
Seoul

- Geumcheon District - Gwanak District - Guro District - Dongjak District - Yeongdeungpo District - Yongsan District - Jung District

== List of Facilities ==
IS: Intersection, IC: Interchange

- (■): National Route 1 overlap

Road name	Name	Hangul name	Connection	Location				Note
Connected with Gyeongsu-daero
Siheung-daero			National Route 1 Gyeongsu-daero	Geumcheon District		Siheung 3-dong		
Siheung-daero			Samseongsan-gil	Geumcheon District		Siheung 3-dong		Unnamed
Siheung-daero			Siheung-daero 6-gil	Geumcheon District		Siheung 3-dong		Unnamed
Siheung-daero			Siheung-daero 8-gil	Geumcheon District		Siheung 3-dong		Unnamed
Siheung-daero	Gia Bridge	기아대교앞	Gia-ro	Geumcheon District		Siheung 3-dong		
Siheung-daero			Siheung-daero 28-gil	Geumcheon District		Siheung 3-dong		Unnamed
Siheung-daero			Siheung-daero 36-gil	Geumcheon District		Siheung 3-dong		Unnamed
Siheung-daero			Siheung-daero 39-gil	Geumcheon District		Siheung 3-dong	Siheung 1-dong	Unnamed
Siheung-daero	Bakmi IS	박미삼거리	Doksan-ro	Geumcheon District		Siheung 5-dong	Siheung 1-dong	
Siheung-daero			Eunpyeongnamu-ro	Geumcheon District		Siheung 1-dong		Unnamed
Siheung-daero			Siheung-daero 51-gil	Geumcheon District		Siheung 1-dong		Unnamed
Siheung-daero	Siheung IS	시흥사거리	National Route 1 Geumha-ro	Geumcheon District		Siheung 1-dong		
Siheung-daero	Geumcheon-gu Office Entrance	금천구청입구	Siheung-daero 71-gil	Geumcheon District		Siheung 1-dong		
Siheung-daero	Geumcheon-gu Office Entrance		Siheung-daero 73-gil	Geumcheon District		Siheung 1-dong		
Siheung-daero			Siheung-daero 90-gil	Geumcheon District		Doksan 1-dong	Doksan 2-dong	Unnamed
Siheung-daero	Malmi IS	말미사거리	Beoman-ro	Geumcheon District		Doksan 1-dong	Doksan 2-dong	
Siheung-daero	Malmi IS		Beoman-ro	Geumcheon District		Doksan 1-dong	Doksan 4-dong	
Siheung-daero	Geumcheon Post Office	금천우체국	Dusan-ro	Geumcheon District		Doksan 1-dong	Doksan 4-dong	
Siheung-daero	Geumcheon Post Office		Siheung-daero 122-gil	Geumcheon District		Doksan 1-dong	Doksan 4-dong	
Siheung-daero	Doksan IS	독산사거리	Gasan-ro	Geumcheon District		Doksan 1-dong	Doksan 4-dong	
Siheung-daero	Doksan IS		Gasan-ro	Geumcheon District		Doksan 1-dong	Doksan 3-dong	
Siheung-daero			Siheung-daero 150-gil	Geumcheon District		Doksan 1-dong	Doksan 3-dong	Unnamed
Siheung-daero	Siheung IC	시흥나들목	Nambu Beltway	Geumcheon District		Doksan 1-dong	Doksan 3-dong	
Siheung-daero	Siheung IC		Digital-ro 31ga-gil	Geumcheon District		Doksan 1-dong	Doksan 3-dong	
Siheung-daero	Siheung IC		Siheung-daero 161-gil	Guro District	Guro 3-dong	Gwanak District	Jowon-dong	
Siheung-daero	Siheung IC		Siheung-daero 161ga-gil	Guro District	Guro 3-dong	Gwanak District	Jowon-dong	
Siheung-daero	Digital Complex Entrance	디지털단지입구	Digital-ro 32-gil	Guro District	Guro 3-dong	Gwanak District	Jowon-dong	
Siheung-daero	Digital Complex Entrance		Siheung-daero 164-gil	Guro District	Guro 3-dong	Gwanak District	Jowon-dong	
Siheung-daero	Guro Digital Complex station	구로디지털단지역	Sinsa-ro	Guro District	Guro 3-dong	Gwanak District	Jowon-dong	
Siheung-daero	Guro Bridge (Dorimcheon)	구로교 (도림천)		Guro District	Guro 3-dong	Gwanak District	Jowon-dong	
Siheung-daero	Guro Bridge (Dorimcheon)			Yeongdeungpo District	Daerim 2-dong	Dongjak District	Sindaebang 1-dong	
Siheung-daero	Daerim IS	대림사거리	Daerim-ro	Yeongdeungpo District	Daerim 2-dong	Dongjak District	Sindaebang 1-dong	
Siheung-daero	Daerim IS		Daerim-ro	Yeongdeungpo District	Daerim 1-dong	Dongjak District	Sindaebang 1-dong	
Siheung-daero			Siheung-daero 187-gil	Yeongdeungpo District	Daerim 1-dong	Dongjak District	Sindaebang 1-dong	Unnamed
Siheung-daero	Daerim IS	대림삼거리	Singil-ro	Yeongdeungpo District	Daerim 1-dong	Dongjak District	Sindaebang 1-dong	
Yeouidaebang-ro	Daerim IS		Singil-ro	Yeongdeungpo District	Singil 6-dong	Dongjak District	Sindaebang 1-dong	
Yeouidaebang-ro			Yeouidodaebang-ro 2-gil	Yeongdeungpo District	Singil 6-dong	Dongjak District	Sindaebang 1-dong	Unnamed
Yeouidaebang-ro			Yeouidodaebang-ro 10-gil	Yeongdeungpo District	Singil 6-dong	Dongjak District	Sindaebang 1-dong	Unnamed
Yeouidaebang-ro			Yeouidodaebang-ro 10-gil	Yeongdeungpo District	Singil 6-dong	Dongjak District	Sindaebang 2-dong	Unnamed
Yeouidaebang-ro	Boramae Park Entrance	보라매공원입구	Yeouidodaebang-ro 20-gil	Yeongdeungpo District	Singil 6-dong	Dongjak District	Sindaebang 2-dong	
Yeouidaebang-ro	Daebangcheon IS	대방천사거리	Daebangcheon-ro	Yeongdeungpo District	Singil 6-dong	Dongjak District	Sindaebang 2-dong	
Yeouidaebang-ro	Daebangcheon IS		Yeouidodaebang-ro 24-gil	Yeongdeungpo District	Singil 6-dong	Dongjak District	Daebang-dong	
Yeouidaebang-ro	Boramae station	보라매역	Sangdo-ro	Yeongdeungpo District	Singil 6-dong	Dongjak District	Daebang-dong	
Yeouidaebang-ro	Boramae station		Sinpung-ro	Yeongdeungpo District	Singil 6-dong	Dongjak District	Daebang-dong	
Yeouidaebang-ro	Navy Hall	해군회관앞	Gamasan-ro	Yeongdeungpo District	Singil 7-dong	Dongjak District	Daebang-dong	
Yeouidaebang-ro	Navy Hall		Yeouidodaebang-ro 36-gil	Yeongdeungpo District	Singil 7-dong	Dongjak District	Daebang-dong	
Yeouidaebang-ro	Sungnam High School Entrance	성남고교입구	Yeouidodaebang-ro 43-gil	Yeongdeungpo District	Singil 7-dong	Dongjak District	Daebang-dong	
Yeouidaebang-ro			Yeouidodaebang-ro 46-gil	Yeongdeungpo District	Singil 7-dong	Dongjak District	Daebang-dong	Unnamed
Yeouidaebang-ro			Yeouidodaebang-ro 49-gil	Yeongdeungpo District	Singil 7-dong	Dongjak District	Daebang-dong	Unnamed
Yeouidaebang-ro	Daebang Underpass (Gyeongbu Line)	대방지하차도 (경부선)		Yeongdeungpo District		Singil 7-dong		
Yeouidaebang-ro	Yeoui Bridge (Yeouido Saetgang)	여의교 (샛강)		Dongjak District		Daebang-dong		
Yeouidaebang-ro	Yeoui Bridge (Yeouido Saetgang)			Yeongdeungpo District		Yeoui-dong		
Yeouidaebang-ro	Yeoui Bridge IS	여의교오거리	Uisadang-daero	Yeongdeungpo District		Yeoui-dong		
Yeouidaebang-ro	Yeoui Bridge IS		Yeouidong-ro	Yeongdeungpo District		Yeoui-dong		
Yeouidaebang-ro			Yeouidodaebang-ro 65-gil	Yeongdeungpo District		Yeoui-dong		Unnamed
Yeouidaebang-ro	Hanyang Apartment	한양아파트앞	Gukjegeumyung-ro	Yeongdeungpo District		Yeoui-dong		
Yeouidaebang-ro	Wonhyo Bridge (Hangang)	원효대교 (한강)		Yeongdeungpo District		Yeoui-dong		
Cheongpa-ro	Wonhyo Bridge (Hangang)			Yongsan District		Wonhyoro 2-dong	Ichon 2-dong	
Cheongpa-ro			Wonhyo-ro	Yongsan District		Hangangro-dong		Unnamed
Cheongpa-ro			Cheongpa-ro 20-gil	Yongsan District		Hangangro-dong		Unnamed
Cheongpa-ro	Yongsan Electronics Market	용산전자상가	Saechang-ro	Yongsan District		Hangangro-dong		
Cheongpa-ro	Ukcheon Overpass (Yongsan Line)	욱천고가 (용산선)		Yongsan District		Hangangro-dong		
Cheongpa-ro	Ukcheon Overpass (Yongsan Line)			Yongsan District		Wonhyoro 1-dong		
Cheongpa-ro			Wonhyo-ro 90-gil	Yongsan District		Wonhyoro 1-dong		Unnamed
Cheongpa-ro	Namyeong station	남영역	Wonhyo-ro	Yongsan District		Wonhyoro 1-dong		
Cheongpa-ro	Namyeong station		Hangang-daero 77-gil	Yongsan District		Cheongpa-dong		
Cheongpa-ro			Cheongpa-ro 45-gil	Yongsan District		Cheongpa-dong		Unnamed
Cheongpa-ro			Hangang-daero 87-gil	Yongsan District		Cheongpa-dong		Unnamed
Cheongpa-ro	Sookmyung Women's University Entrance	숙명여대입구	Cheongpa-ro 47-gil	Yongsan District		Cheongpa-dong		
Cheongpa-ro			Cheongpa-ro 71-gil	Yongsan District		Cheongpa-dong		Unnamed
Cheongpa-ro			Cheongpa-ro 85-gil	Yongsan District		Cheongpa-dong	Namyeong-dong	Unnamed
Cheongpa-ro	Seoul Station (West)	서울역서부	Mallijae-ro	Jung District		Jungnim-dong	Hoehyeon-dong	
Cheongpa-ro	Seoul Station (West)		Jungnim-ro	Jung District		Jungnim-dong	Hoehyeon-dong	
Cheongpa-ro	Jungnim-dong IS	중림동삼거리	Chilpae-ro	Jung District		Jungnim-dong	Hoehyeon-dong	
Cheongpa-ro	Jungnim-dong IS		Cheongpa-ro 103-gil	Jung District		Jungnim-dong	Hoehyeon-dong	
Cheongpa-ro	Seoul Waterworks Office IS	상수도사업본부삼거리	Seosomun-ro	Jung District		Jungnim-dong		
