= Seoul City Route 21 =

Road in South Korea

Seoul Special Metropolitan City Route 21
- 서울특별시도 제21호선

Route information
- Part of AH 1
- Length: 24.2 km (15.0 mi)

Major junctions
- From: Geumcheon District, Seoul
- To: Eunpyeong District, Seoul

Location
- Country: South Korea

Highway system
- Highway systems of South Korea; Expressways; National; Local

Seoul Metropolitan City Route 21 (Korean: 서울특별시도 제21호선) is an urban road located in Seoul, South Korea. With a total length of 24.2 km (15.0 mi), this road starts from the Siheung Intersection in Geumcheon District, Seoul to Yeonsinnae station in Eunpyeong District. This route is a part of Asian Highway 1.

== Stopovers ==
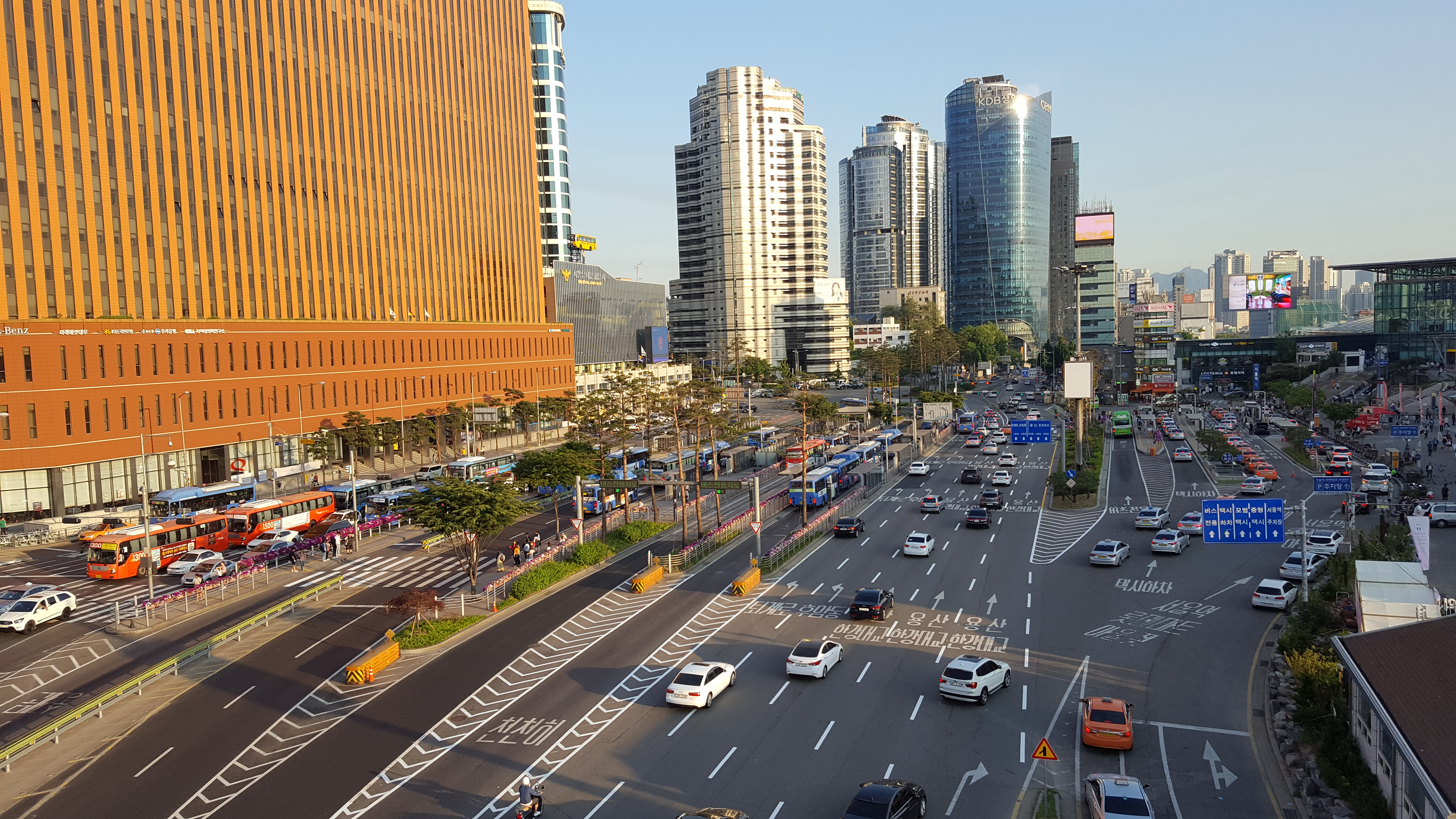
Hangang-daero (on the right corner, you can see Seoul Station entrance.

Seoul

- Geumcheon District - Gwanak District / Guro District - Dongjak District / Yeongdeungpo District - Dongjak District - Yongsan District - Jung District - Jongno District - Seodaemun District - Eunpyeong District

== List of Facilities ==
IS: Intersection, IC: Interchange

| Road name | Name | Hangul name | Connection | Location | | Note |
Directly connected with National Route 1 (Gyeongsu-daero)
| Siheung-daero | Siheung IS | 시흥사거리 | National Route 1 (Geumha-ro) | Seoul | Geumcheon District | |
| Siheung-daero | Geumcheon District Office Entrance IS | 금천구청입구 교차로 | Siheung-daero 73-gil | Seoul | Geumcheon District | |
| Siheung-daero | Malmi IS | 말미사거리 | Beoman-ro | Seoul | Geumcheon District | |
| Siheung-daero | Geumcheon Post Office IS | 금천우체국 교차로 | Dusan-ro; Siheung-daero 122-gil | Seoul | Geumcheon District | |
| Siheung-daero | Doksan IS | 독산사거리 | Gasan-ro | Seoul | Geumcheon District | |
| Siheung-daero | Siheung IC | 시흥 나들목 | Seoul City Route 92 (Nambu Beltway) | Seoul | Geumcheon District | |
| Siheung-daero | Siheung IC | | Seoul City Route 92 (Nambu Beltway) | Seoul | West: Guro District; East: Gwanak District | |
| Siheung-daero | Digital Complex Entrance IS | 디지털단지입구 교차로 | Digital-ro 32-gil | Seoul | West: Guro District; East: Gwanak District | |
| Siheung-daero | Guro Digital Complex Station IS (Guro Bridge) | 구로디지털단지역 교차로 (구로교) | Dorimcheon-ro; Sinsa-ro | Seoul | West: Guro District; East: Gwanak District | |
| Siheung-daero | Guro Digital Complex Station IS (Guro Bridge) | | Dorimcheon-ro; Sinsa-ro | Seoul | West: Yeongdeungpo District; East: Dongjak District | |
| Siheung-daero | Daerim IS | 대림사거리 | Daerim-ro | Seoul | West: Yeongdeungpo District; East: Dongjak District | |
| Siheung-daero | Daerim IS | 대림삼거리 | Singil-ro | Seoul | West: Yeongdeungpo District; East: Dongjak District | |
| Yeouidaebang-ro | Daerim IS | | Singil-ro | Seoul | West: Yeongdeungpo District; East: Dongjak District | |
| Yeouidaebang-ro | Boramae Park Entrance IS (Korea Meteorological Administration) | 보라매공원입구 교차로 (기상청) | Yeouidaebang-ro 20-gil | Seoul | West: Yeongdeungpo District; East: Dongjak District | |
| Yeouidaebang-ro | Daebangcheon IS | 대방천사거리 | Daebangcheon-ro | Seoul | West: Yeongdeungpo District; East: Dongjak District | |
| Yeouidaebang-ro | Boramae Station IS | 보라매역 교차로 | Seoul City Route 90 (Sinpung-ro, Sangdo-ro) | Seoul | West: Yeongdeungpo District; East: Dongjak District | |
| Yeouidaebang-ro | Navy Hall IS | 해군해관앞 교차로 | Gamasan-ro; Yeouidaebang-ro 36-gil | Seoul | West: Yeongdeungpo District; East: Dongjak District | |
| Yeouidaebang-ro | Sungnam High School Entrance IS (Seoul Regional Military Manpower Administration) | 성남고교입구 교차로 (서울지방병무청) | Yeouidaebang-ro 43-gil | Seoul | West: Yeongdeungpo District; East: Dongjak District | |
| Yeouidaebang-ro | Daelim Apartment IS | 대림아파트 교차로 | Yeouidaebang-ro 44-gil Yeouidaebang-ro 47-gil | Seoul | West: Yeongdeungpo District; East: Dongjak District | |
| Yeouidaebang-ro | Daebang Station IS | 대방역 교차로 | Yeongdeungpo-ro; Yeouidaebang-ro | Seoul | West: Yeongdeungpo District; East: Dongjak District | |
| Noryangjin-ro | Daebang Station IS | | Yeongdeungpo-ro; Yeouidaebang-ro | Seoul | Dongjak District | |
| Noryangjin-ro | Dongjak Telephone Office Entrance IS | 동작전화국입구 교차로 | Deungyong-ro | Seoul | Dongjak District | |
| Noryangjin-ro | Yuhan | 유한양행 | | Seoul | Dongjak District | |
| Noryangjin-ro | Noryangjin IS (Noryangjin Station) | 노량진삼거리 (노량진역) | Jangseungbaegi-ro | Seoul | Dongjak District | |
| Noryangjin-ro | No name | (이름 없음) | Manyang-ro | Seoul | Dongjak District | |
| Noryangjin-ro | Susan Market Entrance IS | 수산시장입구 교차로 | Noryangjin-ro 17-gil | Seoul | Dongjak District | |
| Noryangjin-ro | Noryangjin Drainage IS | 노량진배수지 교차로 | Maebong-ro; Noryangjin-ro 23-gil | Seoul | Dongjak District | |
| Noryangjin-ro | Nodeul Station | 노들역 | Yangnyeong-ro | Seoul | Dongjak District | |
| Yangnyeong-ro | Nodeul Station | | Yangnyeong-ro | Seoul | Dongjak District | |
| Yangnyeong-ro | Hangang Br. IS | 한강대교남단 교차로 | Nodeul-ro; Hyeonchung-ro | Seoul | Dongjak District | |
| Yangnyeong-ro | Hangang Bridge | 한강대교 | | Seoul | Dongjak District | |
| Yangnyeong-ro | Hangang Bridge | | | Seoul | Yongsan District | |
| Yangnyeong-ro | Hangang Br. IS | 한강대교북단 교차로 | Ichon-ro; National Route 46 (Gangbyeonbuk-ro); Local Route 23 (Gangbyeonbuk-ro); Seoul City Route 70 (Gangbyeonbuk-ro) | Seoul | Yongsan District | |
| Hangang-daero | Hangang Br. IS | | Ichon-ro; National Route 46 (Gangbyeonbuk-ro); Local Route 23 (Gangbyeonbuk-ro); Seoul City Route 70 (Gangbyeonbuk-ro) | Seoul | Yongsan District | |
| Hangang-daero | Yongsan Station IS | 용산역앞 교차로 | Seobinggo-ro; Hangang-daero 21-gil | Seoul | Yongsan District | |
| Hangang-daero | Yongsan Electronics Market Entrance IS (Sinyongsan Station) | 전자상가입구 교차로 (신용산역) | Saechang-ro | Seoul | Yongsan District | |
| Hangang-daero | Yongsan Post Office IS | 용산우체국 교차로 | Hangang-daero 38-gil | Seoul | Yongsan District | |
| Hangang-daero | Samgakji Station IS | 삼각지역 교차로 | Baekbeom-ro; Itaewon-ro | Seoul | Yongsan District | |
| Hangang-daero | War Memorial of Korea | 전쟁기념관 | | Seoul | Yongsan District | |
| Hangang-daero | Namyeong IS | 남영삼거리 | Hangang-daero 77-gil Wonhyo-ro | Seoul | Yongsan District | |
| Hangang-daero | Sookmyung Women's University Station IS | 숙대입구역 교차로 | Duteopbawi-ro; Cheongpa-ro 47-gil | Seoul | Yongsan District | |
| Hangang-daero | Cheongpa-dong Entrance IS | 청파동입구 교차로 | Cheongpa-ro | Seoul | Yongsan District | |
| Hangang-daero | Seoul Station IS | 서울역 교차로 | Sejong-daero; Toegye-ro; Huam-ro | Seoul | Yongsan District | |
| Tongil-ro | Seoul Station IS | | Sejong-daero; Toegye-ro; Huam-ro | Seoul | Jung District | |
| Tongil-ro | Yeomcheon Bridge IS (Uiju-ro Underpass) | 염천교 교차로 (의주로지하차도) | Chilpae-ro | Seoul | Jung District | |
| Tongil-ro | National Police Agency IS | 경찰청앞 교차로 | Seoul City Route 60 (Seosomun-ro) | Seoul | Jung District | |
| Tongil-ro | National Police Agency | 경찰청 | | Seoul | Jung District | |
| Tongil-ro | Seodaemun Station IS | 서대문역 교차로 | National Route 6 (Saemunan-ro, Chungjeong-ro) | Seoul | Jung District | |
| Tongil-ro | Seodaemun Station IS | | National Route 6 (Saemunan-ro, Chungjeong-ro) | Seoul | Seodaemun District | |
| Tongil-ro | Dongnimmun Station IS (Independence Gate) | 독립문역 교차로 (독립문) | National Route 48; Seoul City Route 50 (Sajik-ro) (Seongsan-ro) | Seoul | Seodaemun District | |
| Tongil-ro | Dongnimmun Station | 독립문역 | | Seoul | Seodaemun District | |
| Tongil-ro | Seodaemun Independence Park IS | 독립공원 교차로 | Tongil-ro 18-gil | Seoul | Seodaemun District | |
| Tongil-ro | Muakjae Station | 무악재역 | Tongil-ro 25-gil | Seoul | Seodaemun District | |
| Tongil-ro | Inwang Apartment IS | 인왕아파트 교차로 | Tongil-ro 34-gil | Seoul | Seodaemun District | |
| Tongil-ro | Hongje IS | 홍제삼거리 | Moraenae-ro | Seoul | Seodaemun District | |
| Tongil-ro | Hongje Station | 홍제역 | | Seoul | Seodaemun District | |
| Tongil-ro | Hongeun IS | 홍은사거리 | Yeonhui-ro; Segeomjeong-ro | Seoul | Seodaemun District | |
| Tongil-ro | Nokbeon Station IS | 녹번역 교차로 | Eunpyeong-ro | Seoul | Eunpyeong District | |
| Tongil-ro | (Former Korea Centers for Disease Control and Prevention Headquarter) | (구 질병관리본부) | Seoul City Route 20 (Jinheung-ro) | Seoul | Eunpyeong District | |
| Tongil-ro | Bulgwang Station IS | 불광역 교차로 | Bulgwang-ro | Seoul | Eunpyeong District | |
| Tongil-ro | Dongmyung Girls' High School IS | 동명여고 교차로 | Yeongmal-ro | Seoul | Eunpyeong District | |
| Tongil-ro | Yeonsinnae station IS | 연신내역 교차로 | National Route 1 (Yeonseo-ro) | Seoul | Eunpyeong District | |
Connected with National Route 1 (Tongil-ro)
