= Samgakji Station =

Train station in South Korea

Coordinates: 37.53551°N 126.97393°E

삼각지 (전쟁기념관); Samgakji (The War Memorial of Korea)
삼각지 (전쟁기념관); Samgakji (The War Memorial of Korea)
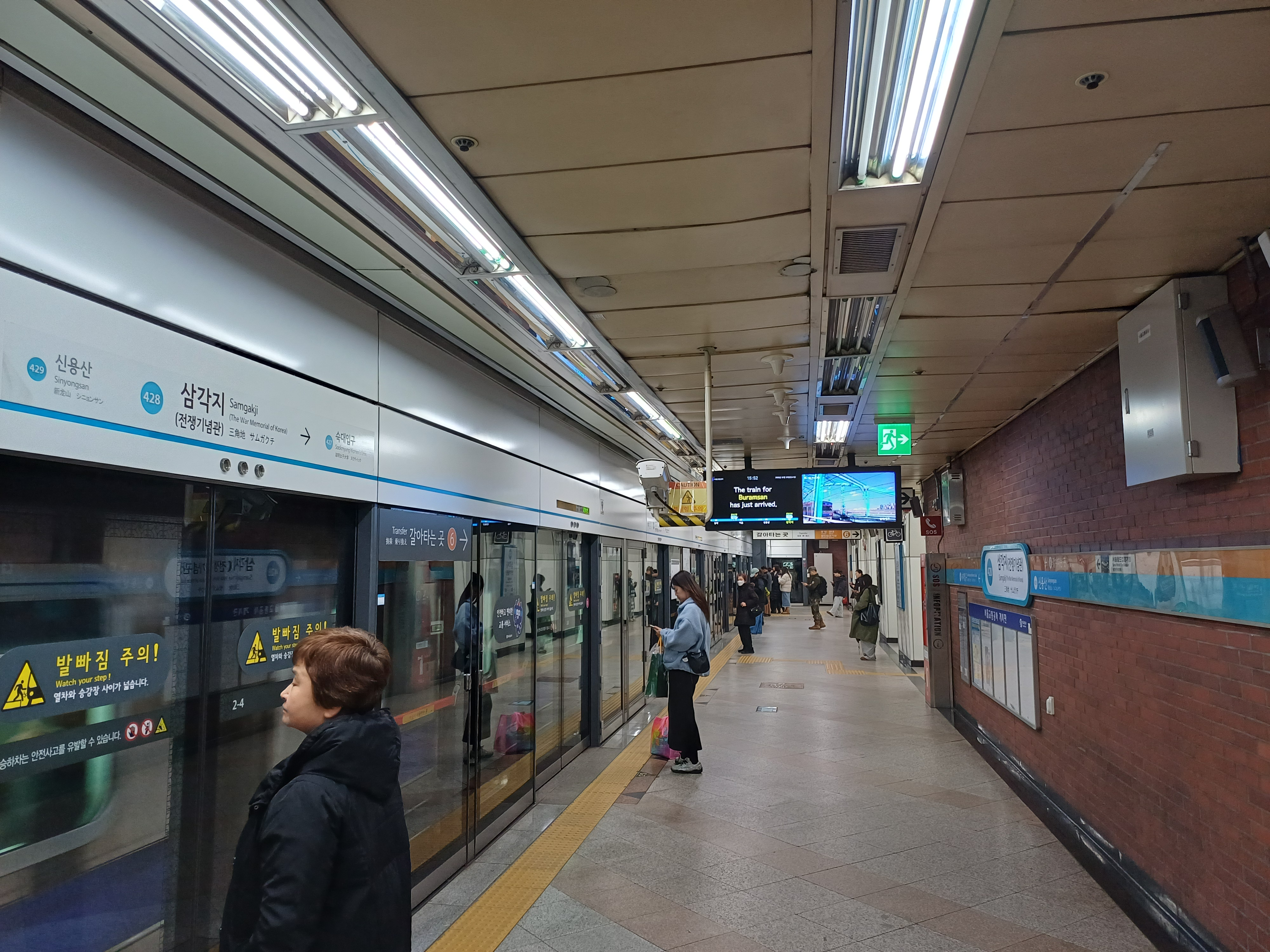
- Station Platform (Line 4)

Korean name
- Hangul: 삼각지역
- Hanja: 三角地驛
- Revised Romanization: Samgakji-yeok
- McCune–Reischauer: Samgakchi-yŏk

General information
- Location: 180 Hangang-daero, 293 Hangangno 1-ga, Yongsan-gu, Seoul
- Operator: Seoul Metro
- Lines: Line 4 Line 6
- Platforms: 3
- Tracks: 4

Construction
- Structure type: Underground

Key dates
- October 18, 1985: Line 4 opened
- December 15, 2000: Line 6 opened
Location

Samgakji Station is a subway station on the Line 4 and Line 6 of the Seoul Metropolitan Subway. The Seoul War Memorial is a short walk away from exits 11 and 12. This station is on the west end of the Yongsan Garrison, which is a short walk from exit 13. Although not connected to this station by a transfer passageway, Namyeong Station on Line 1 is a short walk from here.

The Samgakji area was made famous in Korea because of a 1967 song by Bae Ho titled "Return to Samgakji." A statue dedicated to the song was erected in front of the station.

Line 4 has two-sided, two-track, opposite-side platforms, while Line 6 is equipped with a single-sided, two-track island platform. Both lines have screen doors installed on their respective platforms. In the case of Line 4, it was possible to cross the other side via a transit passageway, but this has recently been changed to allow for cross-platform crossing. There are 14 exits.

== Station layout ==
G	Street level	Exit

L1; Concourse	Lobby	Customer Service, Shops, Vending machines, ATMs

L2; Line 4 platforms	Side platform, doors will open on the right
L2; Line 4 platforms	Northbound	← Line 4 toward Jinjeop (Sookmyung Women's Univ.)
L2; Line 4 platforms	Southbound	Line 4 toward Oido (Sinyongsan) →
L2; Line 4 platforms	Side platform, doors will open on the right

L3; Line 6 platforms	Westbound	← Line 6 toward Eungam (Hyochang Park)
L3; Line 6 platforms	Island platform, doors will open on the left
L3; Line 6 platforms	Eastbound	Line 6 toward Sinnae (Noksapyeong) →

== Vicinity ==
- Exit 1 : MND Club, Army Club
- Exit 5 : Yongsan Fire Station
- Exit 8 : Yongsan Elementary School
- Exit 12 : Seoul War Memorial
- Exit 13 : Ministry of National Defense and Yongsan Garrison, U.S. Army Base

== Gallery ==
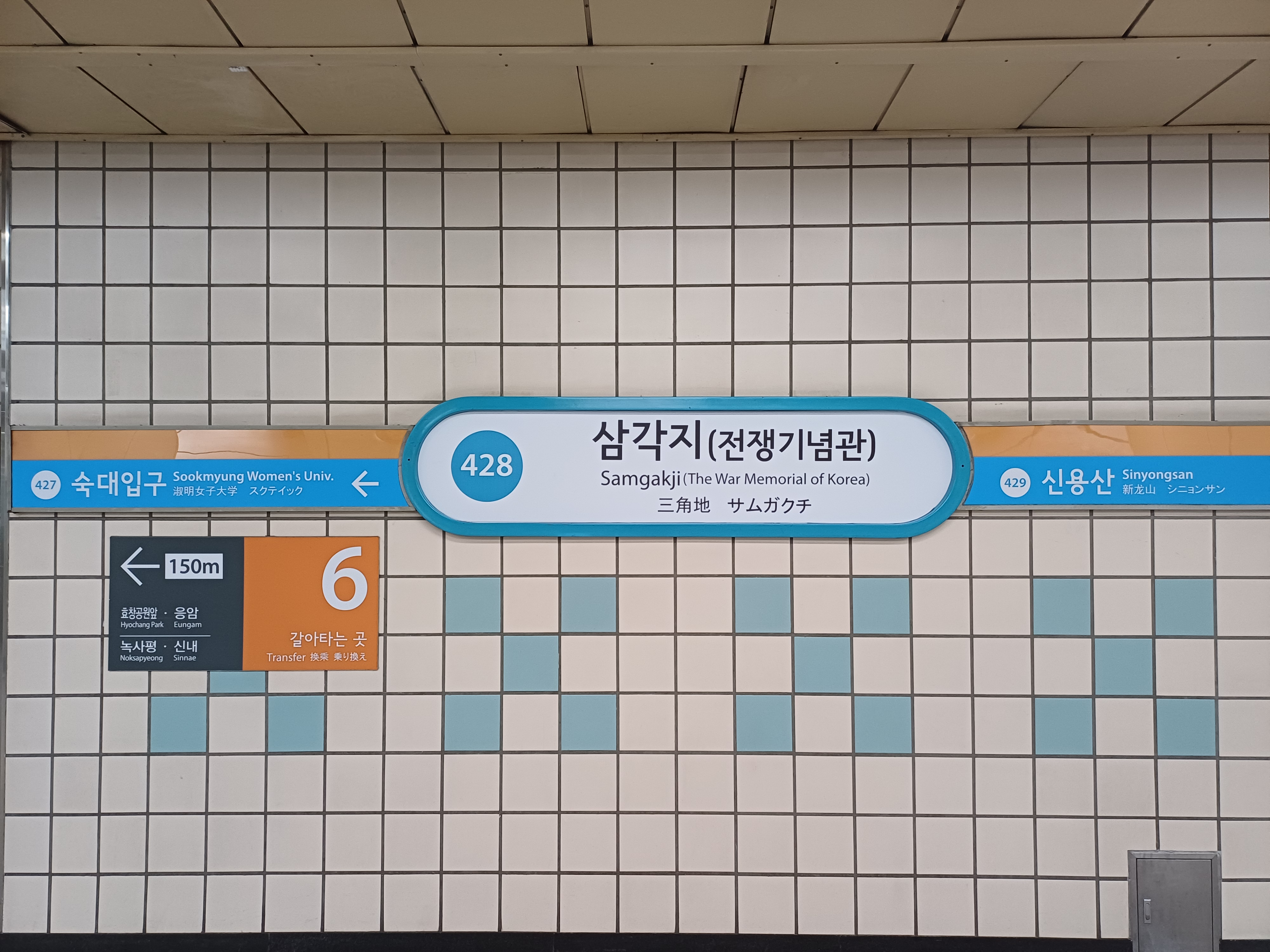
Line 4 station nameplate

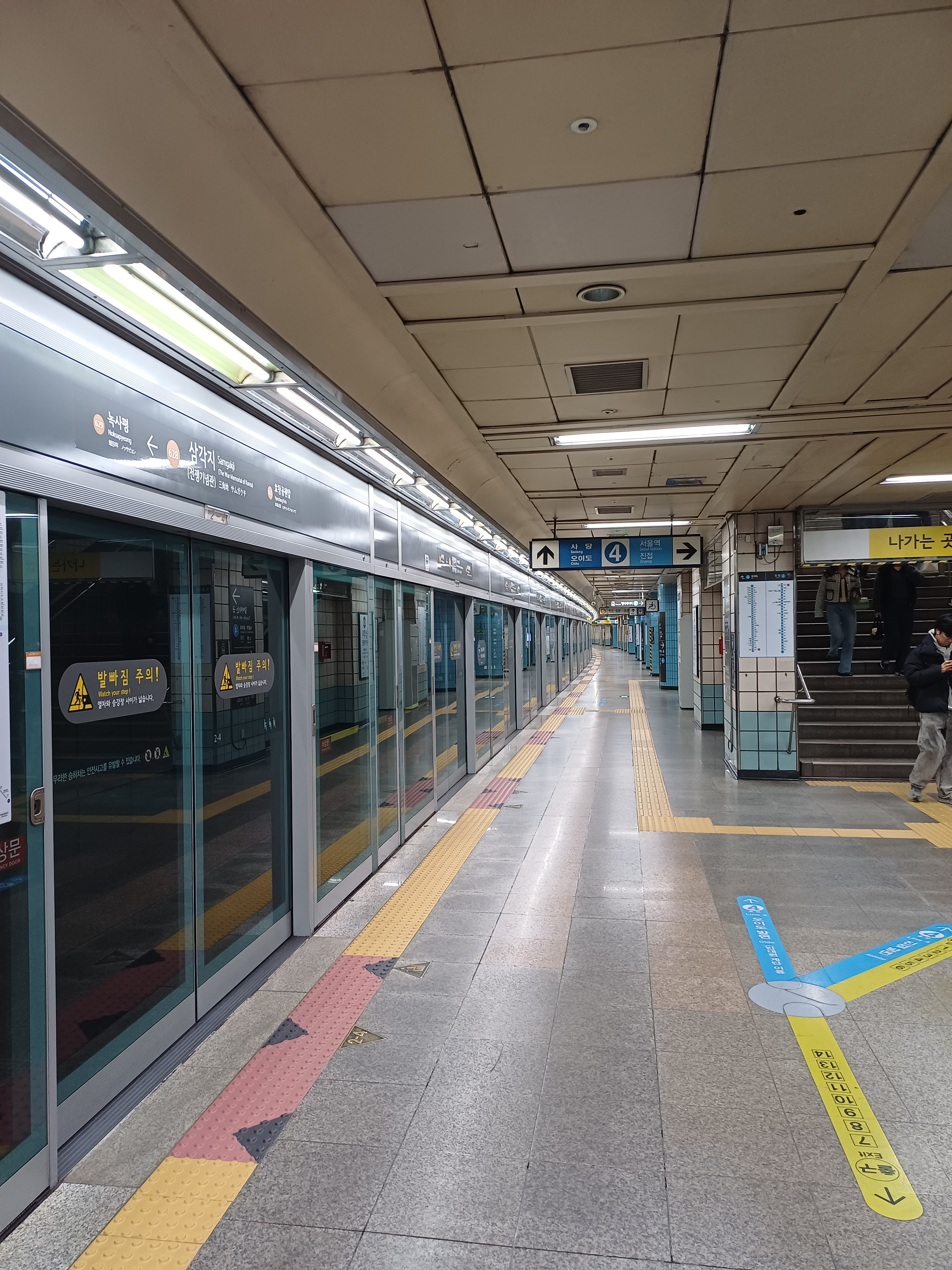
Line 6 platform

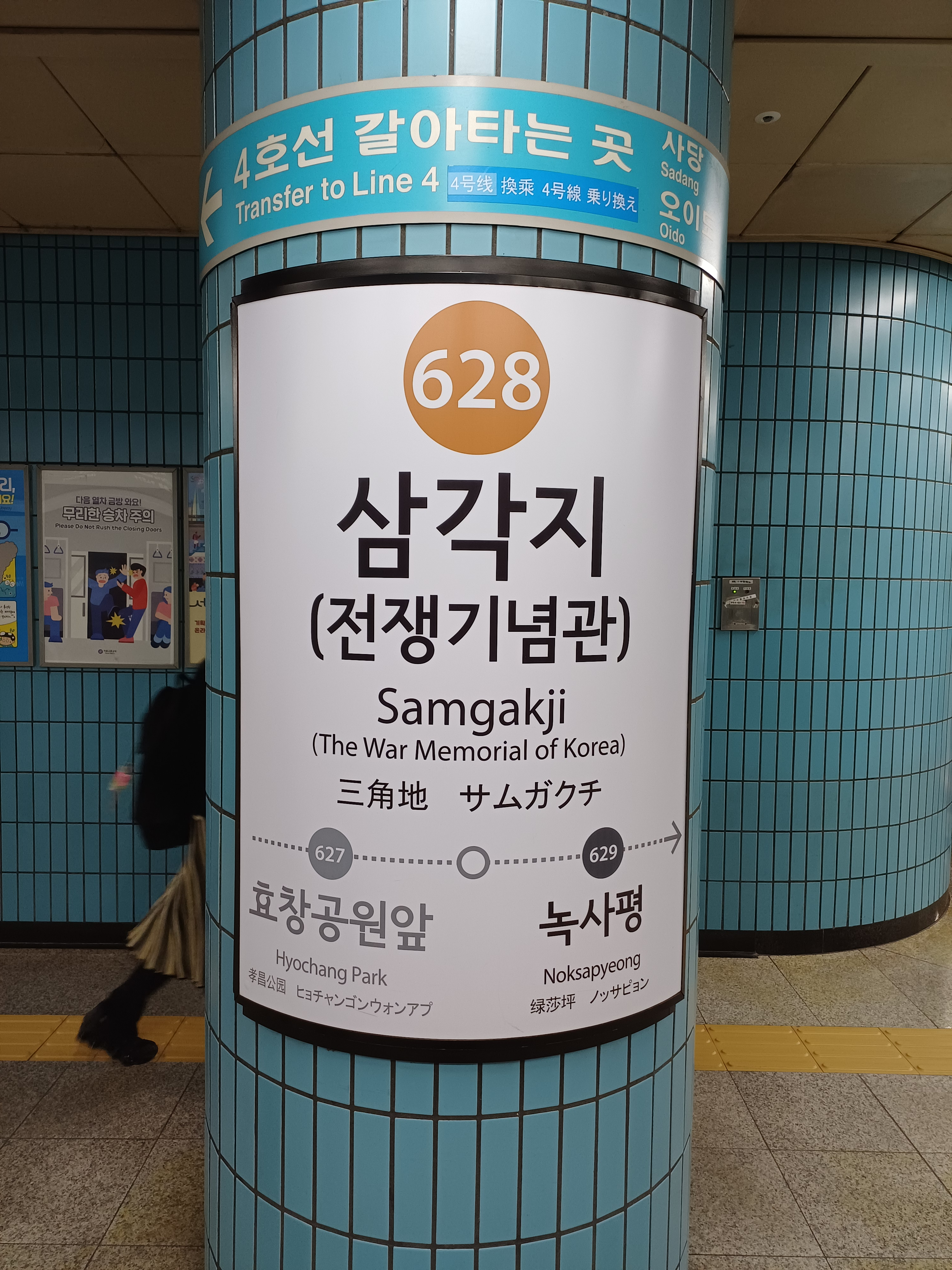
Line 6 station nameplate

Preceding station	Seoul Metropolitan Subway	Following station
Sookmyung Women's University towards Jinjeop	Line 4	Sinyongsan towards Oido
Hyochang Park towards Eungam	Line 6	Noksapyeong towards Sinnae
