= Sinyongsan station =

Station of the Seoul Metropolitan Subway

Coordinates: 37.52913°N 126.96790°E

신용산 (아모레퍼시픽); Sinyongsan (AMOREPACIFIC)
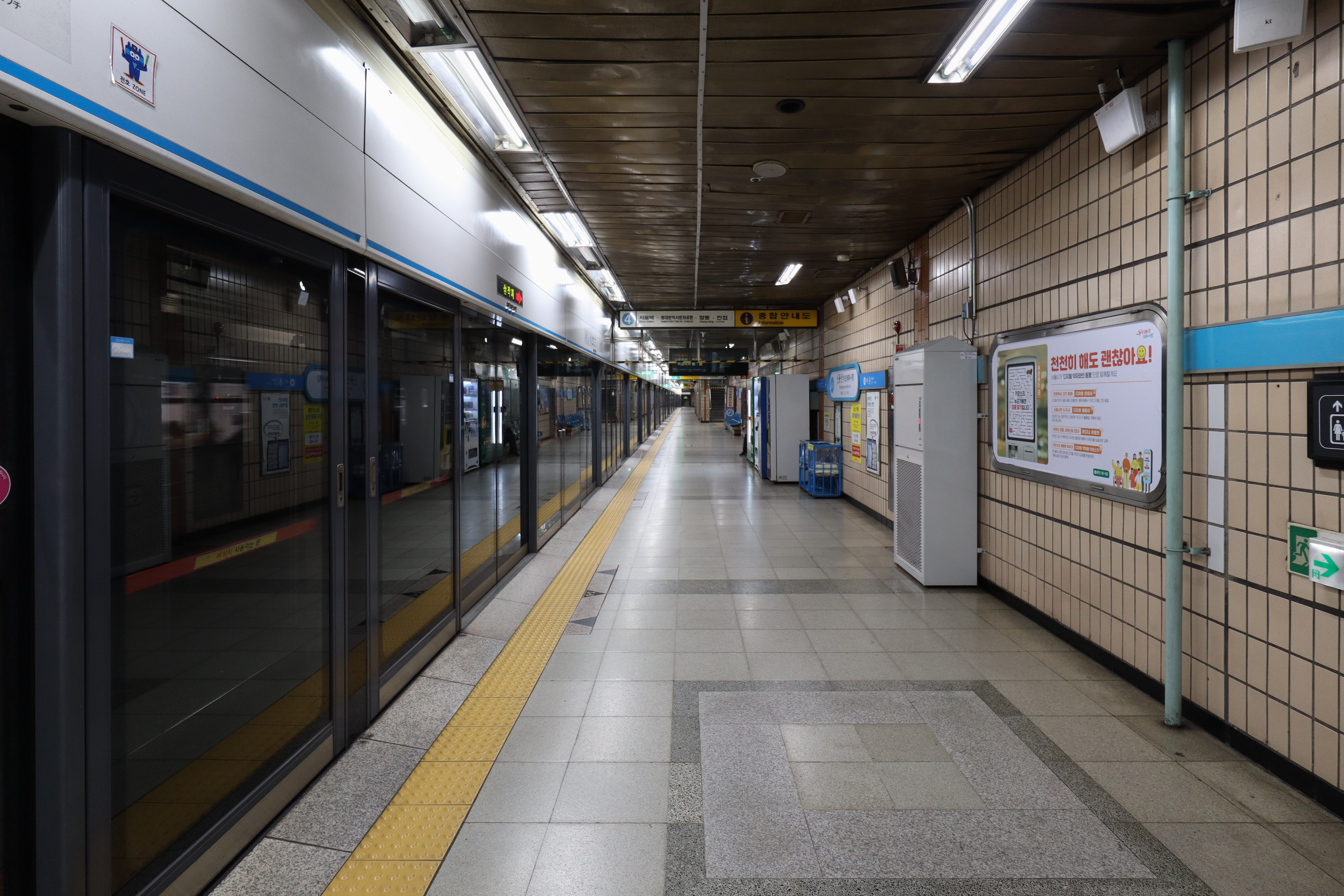

Korean name
- Hangul: 신용산역
- Hanja: 新龍山驛
- Revised Romanization: Sinnyongsan-yeok
- McCune–Reischauer: Sinnyongsan-yŏk

General information
- Location: B 112, Hangang-daero, Yongsan-gu, Seoul
- Operator: Seoul Metro
- Line: Line 4
- Platforms: 2
- Tracks: 2

Construction
- Structure type: Underground

Key dates
- October 18, 1985: Line 4 opened
Location

Sinyongsan station is a station on the Seoul Subway Line 4 in Hangang-daero, Yongsan-gu, Seoul. Although not connected to this station by a transfer passageway, Yongsan station on Line 1 is a short walk away. The southwestern section of Yongsan Garrison can be accessed easily from this station. Its station subname is AMOREPACIFIC, as the headquarters for Amorepacific Corporation are located outside of the station.

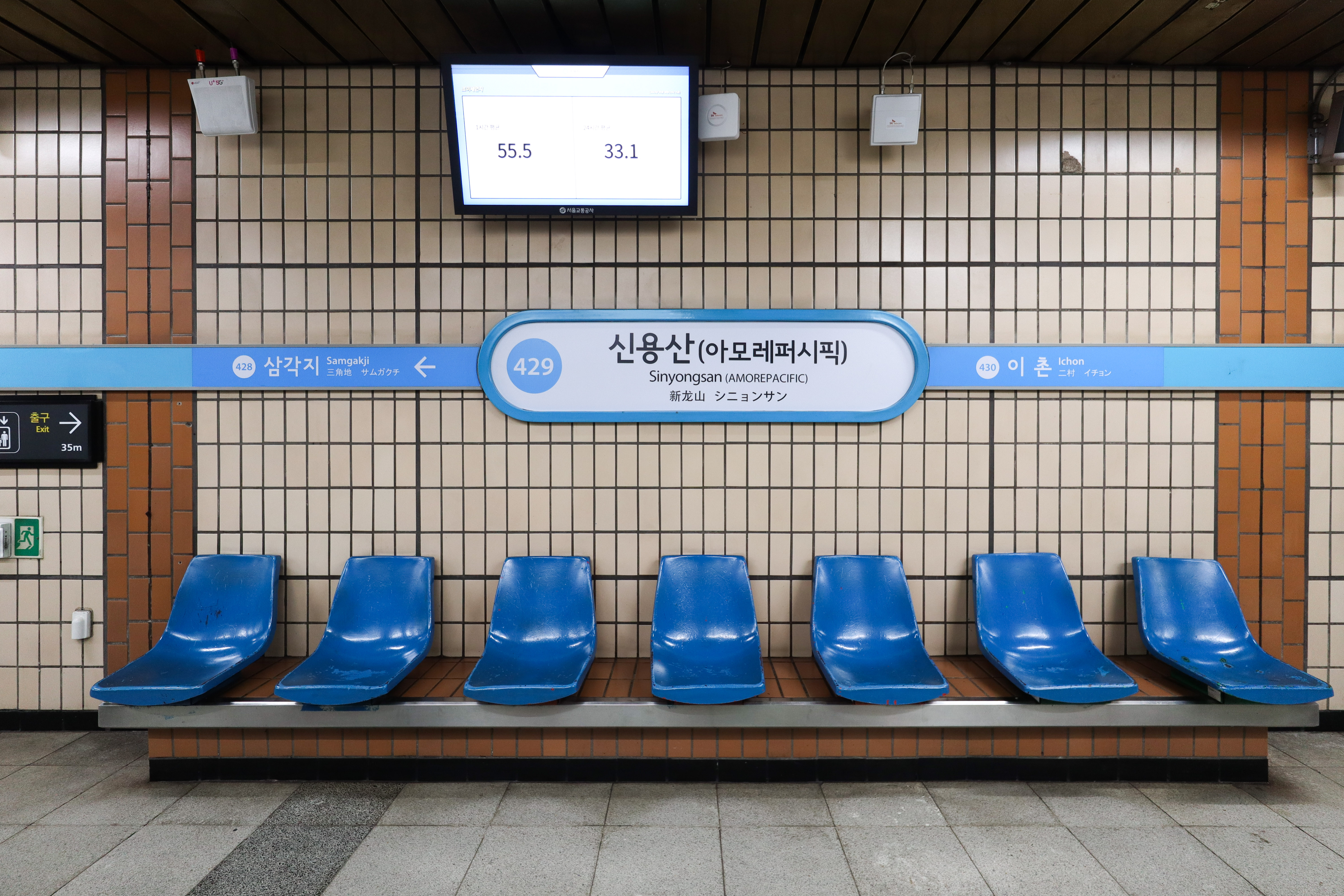

== Station layout ==
G	Street level	Exit

L1; Concourse	Lobby	Customer service, shops, vending machines, ATMs

L2; Platforms	Side platform, doors will open on the right
L2; Platforms	Northbound	← Line 4 toward Jinjeop (Samgakji)
L2; Platforms	Southbound	Line 4 toward Oido (Ichon) →
L2; Platforms	Side platform, doors will open on the right

== Neighborhood ==
- Korail Yongsan station for KTX, ITX-Saemaeul, Mugunghwa-ho trains.

Preceding station	Seoul Metropolitan Subway	Following station
Samgakji towards Jinjeop	Line 4	Ichon towards Oido
