= Seoul Station =

Major railway station in South Korea

서울
Seoul
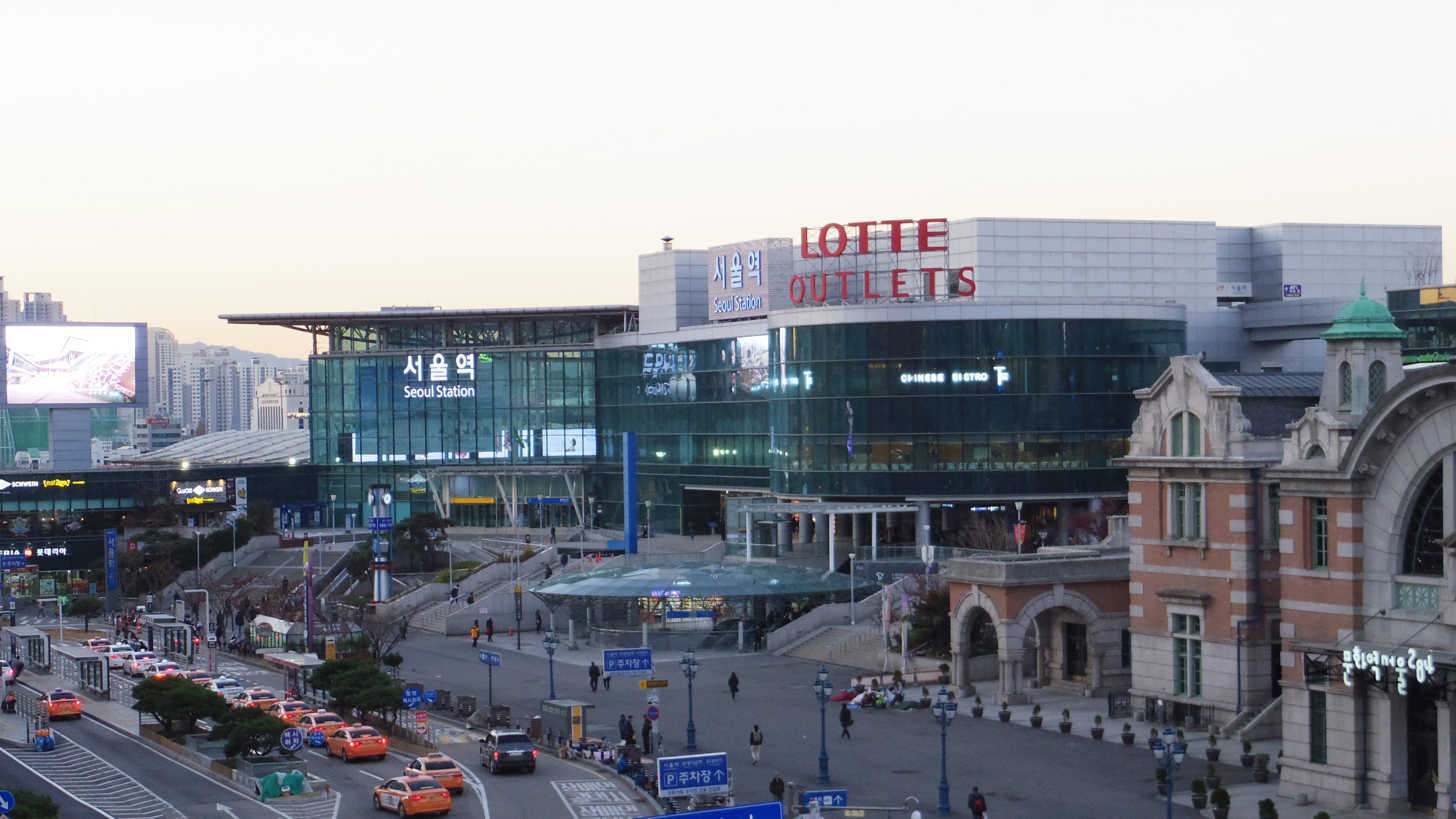

Korean name
- Hangul: 서울역
- Hanja: 서울驛
- RR: Seoul-yeok
- MR: Sŏul-yŏk

General information
- Location: Bongnae-dong and Dongja-dong, Seoul; South Korea
- Coordinates: 37°33′11″N 126°58′21″E
- Operator: Korail
- Platforms: 14
- Tracks: 7

Construction
- Structure type: At-grade

History
- Opened: July 8, 1900 (original station building)

Passengers
- 93,171 (Korail Intercity)
Services
Preceding station	Korea Train Express	Following station
Haengsin Terminus	Gyeongbu KTX	Gwangmyeong towards Busan
Haengsin Terminus	Gyeongjeon KTX	Gwangmyeong towards Jinju
Haengsin Terminus	Donghae KTX	Gwangmyeong towards Pohang
Terminus	Gyeongbu KTX via Suwon	Yeongdeungpo towards Busan
Haengsin Terminus	Gangneung KTX	Cheongnyangni towards Gangneung
Terminus	Gangneung KTX	Cheongnyangni towards Donghae
Terminus	Jungang KTX	Cheongnyangni towards Bujeon
Haengsin Terminus	Honam KTX	Yongsan towards Mokpo
Terminus	Honam KTX	Yongsan towards Mokpo
Preceding station	Korail	Following station
Terminus	Mugunghwa-ho Gyeongbu Line	Yeongdeungpo towards Busan
Terminus	Mugunghwa-ho Chungbuk Line	Yeongdeungpo towards Jecheon
Terminus	S-Train West	Yeongdeungpo towards Yeosu-Expo
Terminus	DMZ Peace Link Train	Unjeong towards Dorasan
Terminus	Chungbuk Yeongdong Gugak Wine Train	Yongsan towards Yeongdong
Terminus	ITX-Saemaeul Gyeongbu Line	Yeongdeungpo towards Busan
Terminus	ITX-Maum Gyeongbu Line	Yeongdeungpo towards Busan
Preceding station	Seoul Metropolitan Subway	Following station
Terminus	Line 1 Gyeongbu Express	Geumcheon-gu Office towards Sinchang
Terminus	Line 1 Gyeongbu Express	Yeongdeungpo One-way operation
Location

Seoul Station (Korean: 서울역) is a major railway station in Seoul, the capital of South Korea. The station is served by the Korail Intercity Lines and the commuter trains of the Seoul Metropolitan Subway.

== Services ==
14·13 | | 12·11 | | 10·9 | | 8·7 | | 6·5 | | 4·3 | | 2·1 |
Namyeong ↓

Platform No.	Line	Train	Destination
1·2	Seoul Subway Line 1	Express	Suwon; Byeongjeom; Pyeongtaek; Cheonan
3·12	Mainline trains Gyeongbu Line	KTX·ITX-Saemaeul·Mugunghwa-ho	Daejeon; Dongdaegu; Busan; Pohang; Masan; Suncheon; Sinhaeundae; Sinchang; Haengsin (Seoul Arrival)
13·14	Mainline trains Gangneung LineㆍDonghae LineㆍJungang Line	KTX	Cheongnyangni; Gangneung; Donghae; Wonju; Jecheon; Yeongju; Andong; Yeonghcheon; Gyeongju; Taehwagang; Bujeon

=== KTX ===
Seoul Station is the terminus of most KTX trains including:

- All trains along the Gyeongbu High Speed Line to Busan, Daejeon, Daegu, Pohang, Masan and Jinju.
- Some trains exclusively Honam High Speed Line and Jeolla lines to GwangjuSongjeong, Mokpo, Suncheon and Yeosu Expo.
- Almost all trains along the Gyeonggang line to Pyeongchang, Jinbu, Gangneung & Donghae; and
- All KTX trains operating along sections of the conventional Gyeongbu line.

Some KTX services operating along sections of the conventional Honam Line bound for GwangjuSongjeong, Mokpo and Yeosu Expo arrive and depart Yongsan station.

=== ITX-Saemaeul ===
Seoul Station is the terminus of all ITX-Saemaeul trains along the Gyeongbu and Gyeongjeon Lines to Busan, Daejeon, Daegu, Pohang, Masan and Jinju. ITX-Saemaeul trains on the Honam and Jeolla lines arrive and depart Yongsan station. ITX-Saemaeul trains to the east of Korea serve Cheongnyangni station.

=== Mugunghwa-ho ===
Seoul Station is the terminus of all Mugunghwa-ho trains along the Gyeongbu and Gyeongjeon Lines to Busan, Daejeon, Daegu, Pohang, Masan and Jinju; along the and along the Chungbuk Line to Jecheon. Mugunghwa-ho trains on the Honam and Jeolla lines arrive and depart Yongsan station. Mugunghwa-ho trains to the east of Korea serve Cheongnyangni station.

=== Korail tourist trains ===
Seoul Station is the terminus of a number of Korail's tourist trains, including, but not limited to:

- The DMZ Peace Link Train to Dorasan station
- The S-train to Yeosu-Expo

=== AREX Airport Railway ===
AREX operate two trains from Seoul Station. AREX Express trains run non-stop to Incheon Airport stopping only at Incheon Terminal 1 and Incheon Terminal 2. AREX All-Stop trains are commuter style trains that stop 11 times, including at Seoul's Gimpo International Airport.

AREX Express passengers have exclusive access to Seoul Station's City Air Terminal which allows passengers travelling on most Korean airlines from Incheon Airport to check bags and receive boarding passes before boarding the train. Access to the underground Airport Railroad station and City Air Terminal is either from the central station concourse or via a dedicated drop off area and car park on the west side of the station.

=== Seoul Subway ===
The Seoul Subway serves the station with GTX Line A, Line 1 and Line 4, and an hourly train on the Gyeongui–Jungang Line.

Around 2015, a large bus transfer center was built in front of the station's main entrance. It has about nine platforms that services different bus routes in Seoul. It is separated from the main roads with a barrier around the platforms. Yet having a rather complicated structure with many bus platforms, the transfer center is built in a simple manner as it is not a separate terminal building.

=== Gyeongui–Jungang Line ===
서울역; Seoul Station
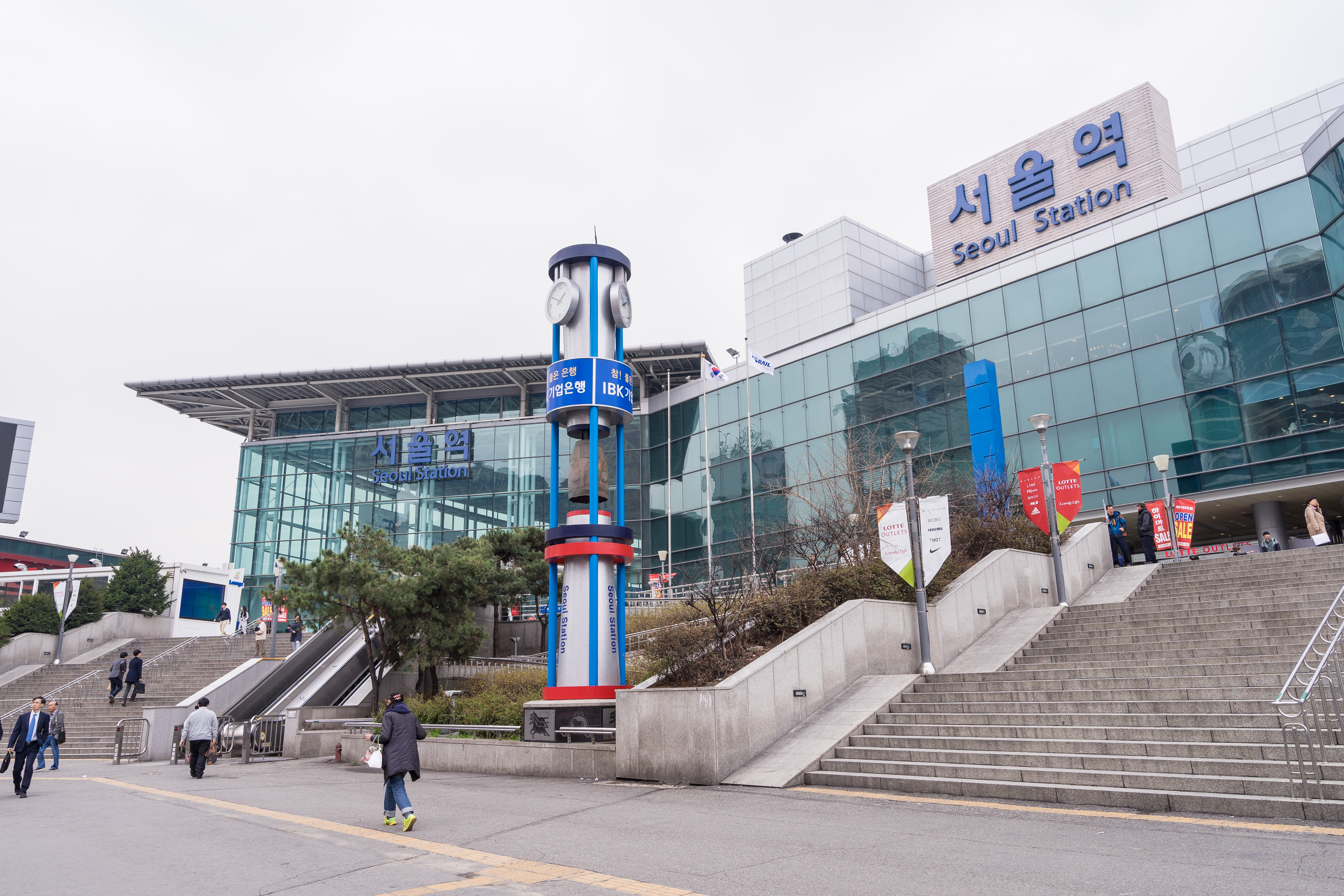

General information
- Location: 43–205, Dongja-dong, Yongsan-gu, Seoul (1 Namdaemunno)
- Owner: Korea Rail Network Authority
- Operator: Korail
- Line: Gyeongui Line
- Platforms: 1
- Tracks: 1

Construction
- Structure type: Ground

Other information
- Station code: P313

History
- Opened: September 12, 1988

Key dates
- July 1, 2009: Gyeongui–Jungang Line opened

Passengers
- 13,263 (Gyeongui–Jungang Line)
Services
Preceding station	Seoul Metropolitan Subway	Following station
Sinchon towards Munsan	Gyeongui–Jungang Line	Terminus
Sinchon towards Munsan	Gyeongui–Jungang Line Gyeongui Express	Terminus
Location

↑Sinchon
| 1 |
Terminus

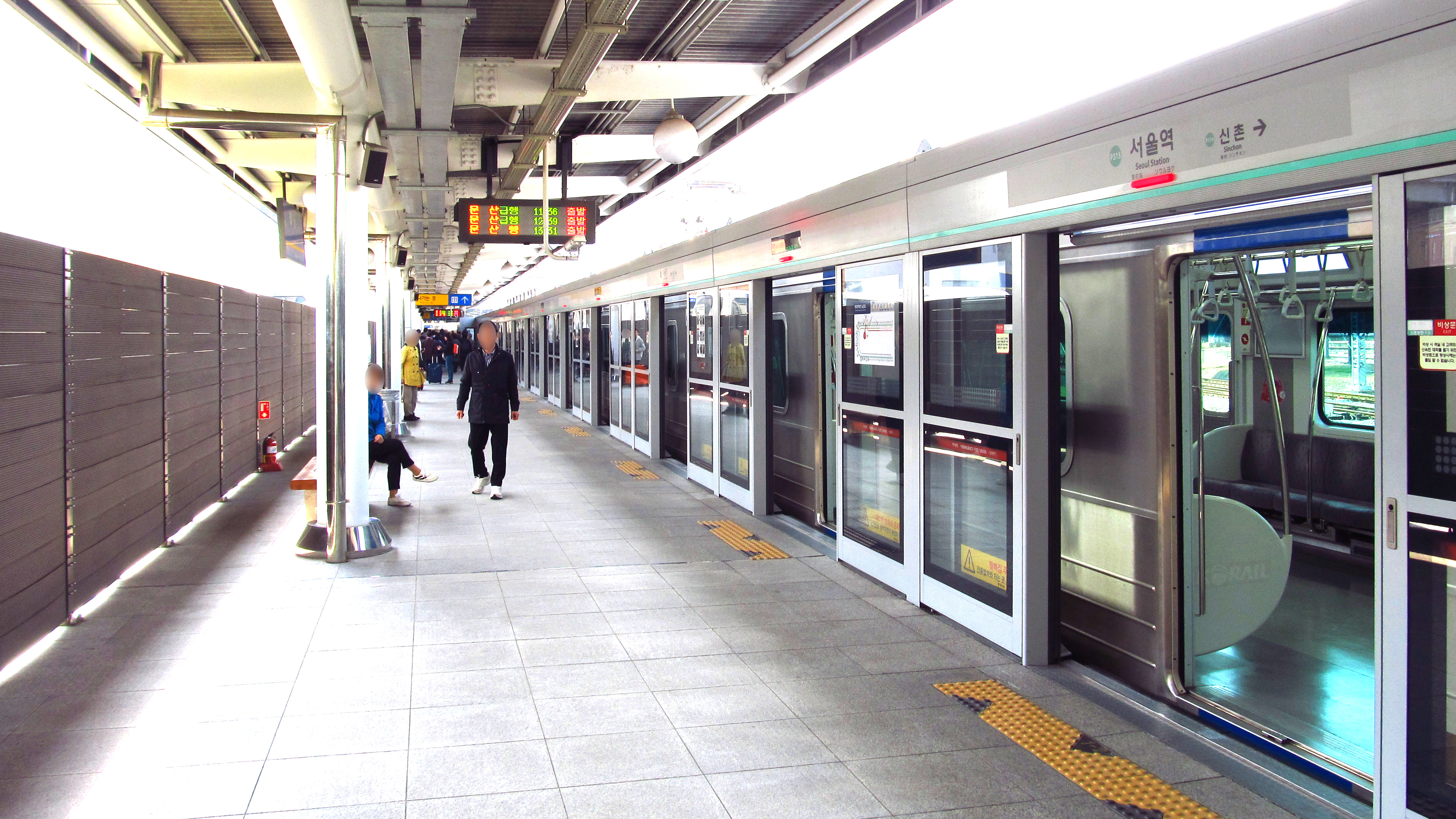
The Gyeongui-Jungang Line platform

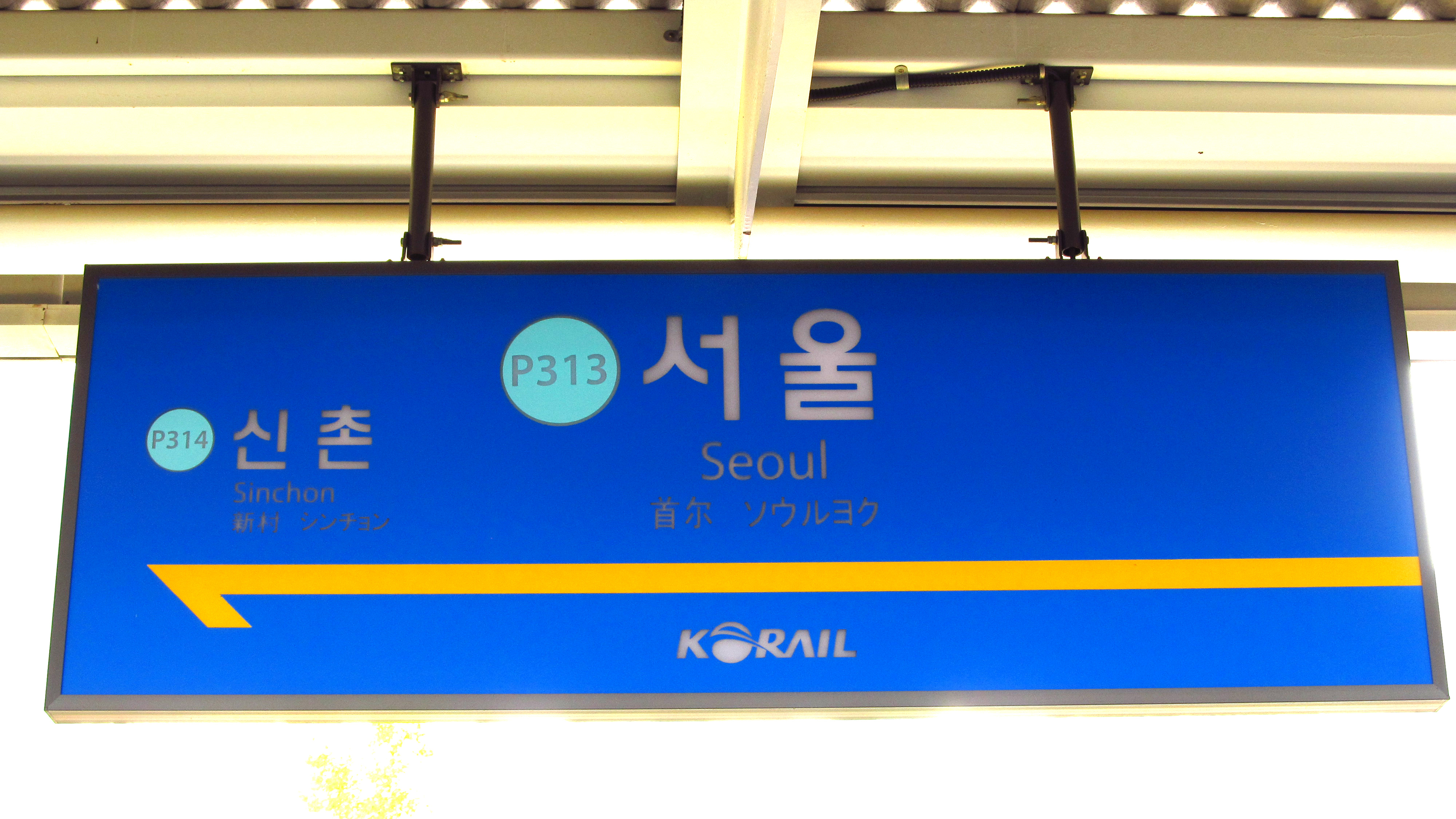
Gyeongui-Jungang Line Seoul Station sign

=== AREX ===
서울역; Seoul Station
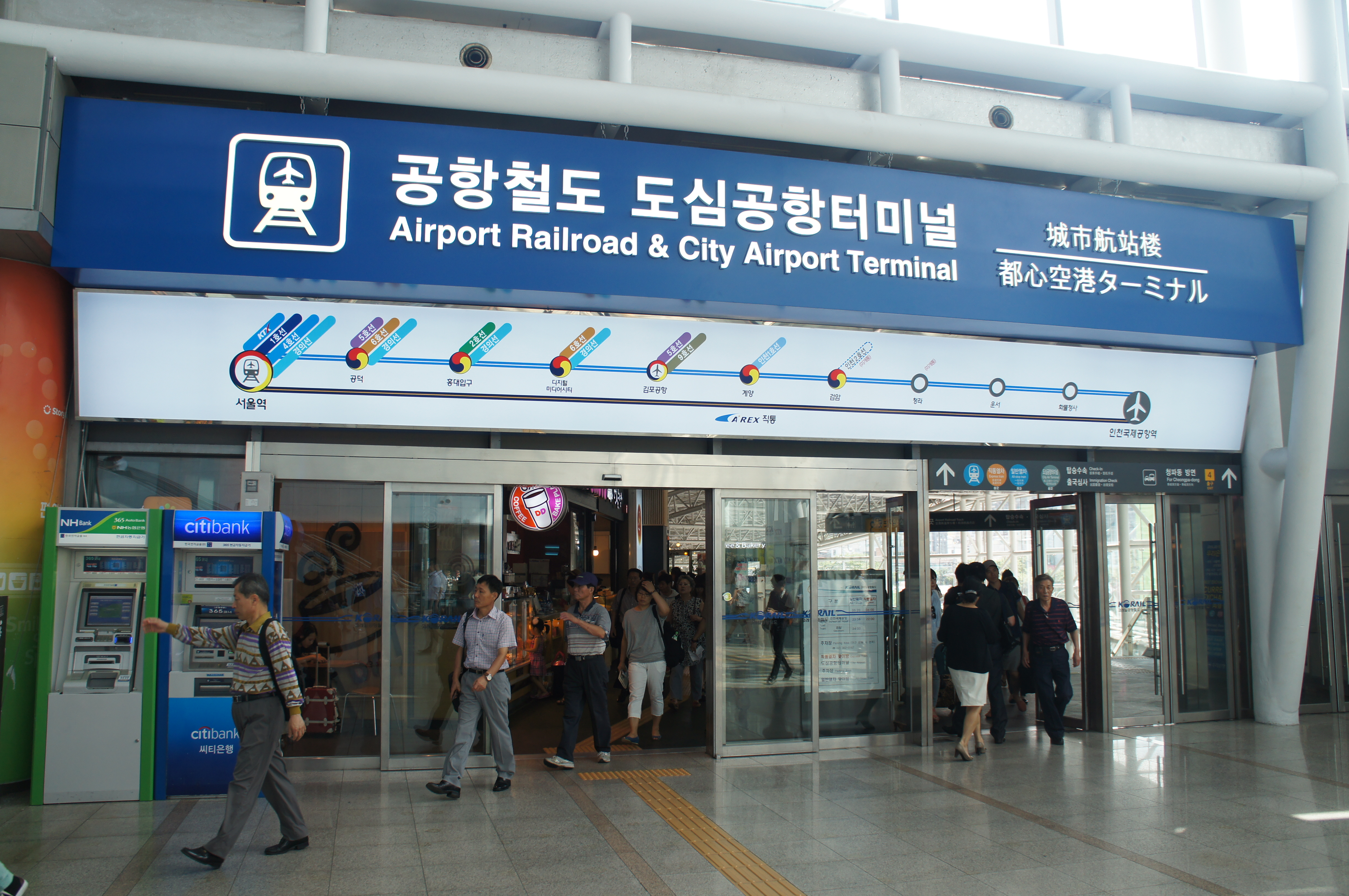
- Entrance for AREX

General information
- Owner: Korea Rail Network Authority
- Operator: Airport Railroad Co., Ltd.
- Line: AREX
- Platforms: 2
- Tracks: 3

Construction
- Structure type: Underground

Other information
- Station code: A01

History
- Opened: December 29, 2010

Passengers
- 29,796
Services
Preceding station	Seoul Metropolitan Subway	Following station
Terminus	AREX	Gongdeok towards Incheon International Airport Terminal 2
Terminus	AREX Express	Incheon International Airport Terminal 1 towards Incheon International Airport Terminal 2
Location

↑ Terminus ↑

Local	Express

Gongdeok ↓ / Incheon Int'l Airport Terminal 1 ↓

Line	Train	Destination
●AREX	Local; Express	Terminate Platform
●AREX	Local	Gimpo Int'l Airport; Incheon Int'l Airport Terminal 1; Incheon Int'l Airport Terminal 2
●AREX	Express	Incheon Int'l Airport Terminal 1; Incheon Int'l Airport Terminal 2

- Platform numbers are not assigned; instead, platforms are classified as "express" or "local"

==== Platform layout (AREX) ====
AREX platform level	Eastbound local	← AREX Local Alighting passengers only
AREX platform level	Island platform, doors will open on the right
AREX platform level	Westbound local	AREX Local toward Incheon Int'l Airport Terminal 2 (Gongdeok) →
AREX platform level	Express	AREX Express toward Incheon Int'l Airport Terminal 2 (Incheon Int'l Airport Terminal 1) →
AREX platform level	Express	← AREX Express Alighting passengers only
AREX platform level	Side platform, doors will open on the right

=== Seoul Metro ===
서울역; Seoul Station
서울역; Seoul Station
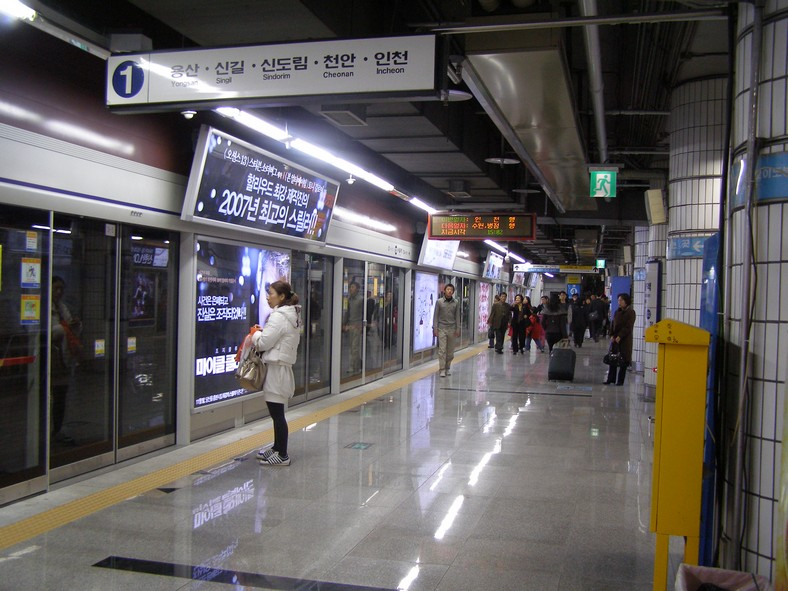
- Line 1 platform

General information
- Location: Bongnaedong 2-ga, Jung-gu (Line 1); Dongja-dong, Yongsan-gu (Line 4); Seoul
- Operator: Seoul Metro
- Platforms: 1 (Line 1); 1 (Line 4)
- Tracks: 2 (Line 1); 2 (Line 4)

Construction
- Structure type: Underground

History
- Opened: August 15, 1974 (Line 1); October 18, 1985 (Line 4)

Passengers
- 133,833 (Line 1); 32,687 (Line 4)
Services
Preceding station	Seoul Metropolitan Subway	Following station
City Hall towards Kwangwoon University or Yeoncheon	Line 1	Namyeong towards Incheon, Seodongtan or Sinchang
City Hall towards Dongducheon	Line 1 Gyeongwon Express	Namyeong towards Incheon
City Hall towards Cheongnyangni	Line 1 Gyeongbu Express	Namyeong towards Sinchang
Hoehyeon towards Jinjeop	Line 4	Sookmyung Women's University towards Oido
Location

Platform	Line	Destination
Line 1 Platform
To Sinchang / Incheon	●Line 1	Guro; Incheon; Byeongjeom; Seodongtan; Cheonan; Sinchang
To Yeoncheon	●Line 1	Cheongnyangni; Kwangwoon University; Uijeongbu; Dongducheon; Yeoncheon
Line 4 Platform
To Jinjeop	●Line 4	Chungmuro; Dongdaemun; Nowon; Jinjeop
To Oido	●Line 4	Dongjak; Sadang; Geumjeong; Oido

==== Platform layout (Seoul Metro) ====
Line 1 platforms	Southbound	Line 1 toward Incheon, Sinchang or Seodongtan (Namyeong) →
Line 1 platforms	Island platform, doors will open on the right
Line 1 platforms	Northbound	← Line 1 toward Yeoncheon, Uijeongbu or Kwangwoon University (City Hall)
Line 4 platforms	Northbound	← Line 4 toward Jinjeop (Hoehyeon)
Line 4 platforms	Island platform, doors will open on the left
Line 4 platforms	Southbound	Line 4 toward or Oido (Sookmyung Women's Univ.) →

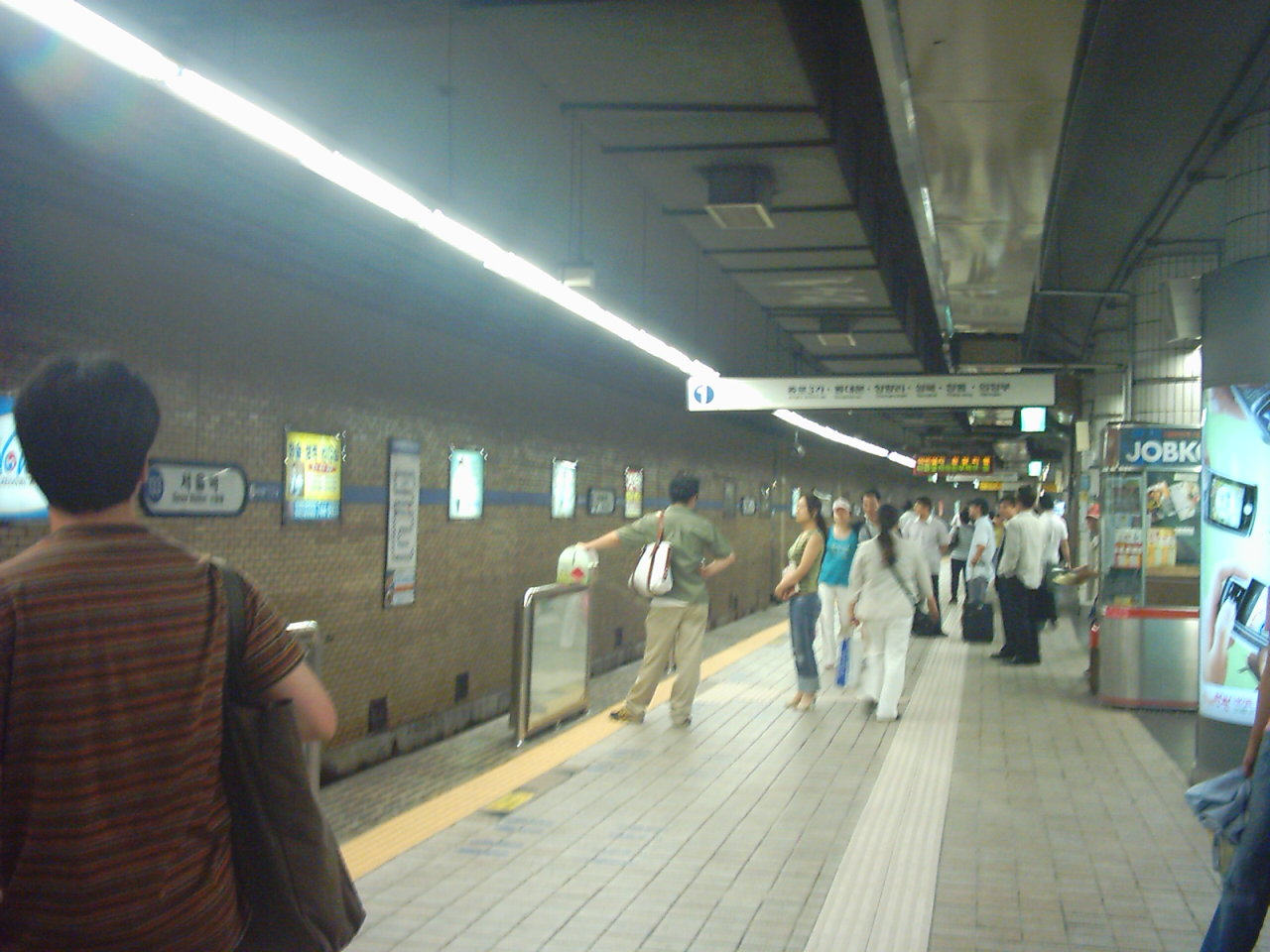
The Seoul Subway Line 1 platforms in July 2006, before interior refurbishment and platform screen doors retrofit

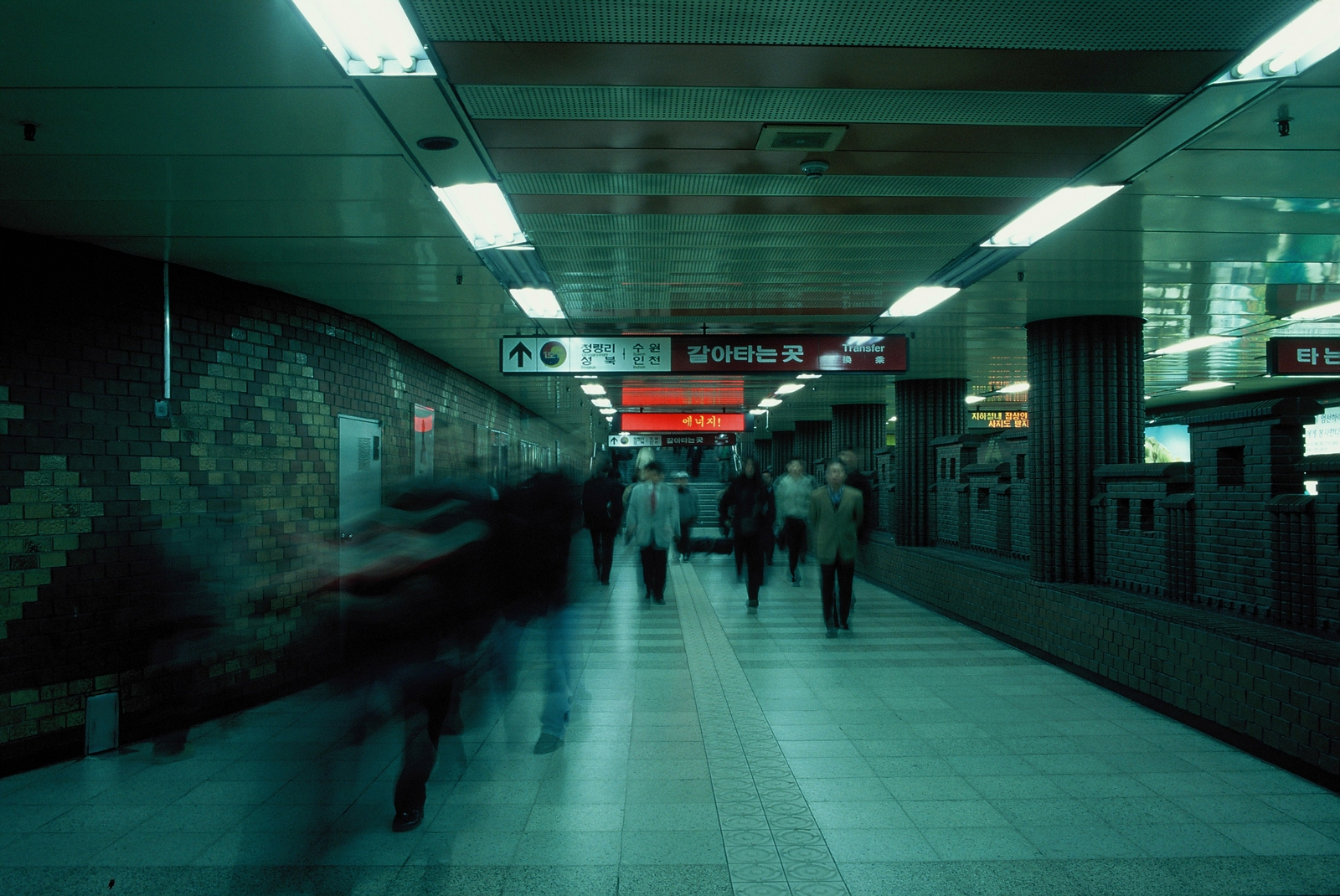
Transfer passage to Line 1 (November 1999)

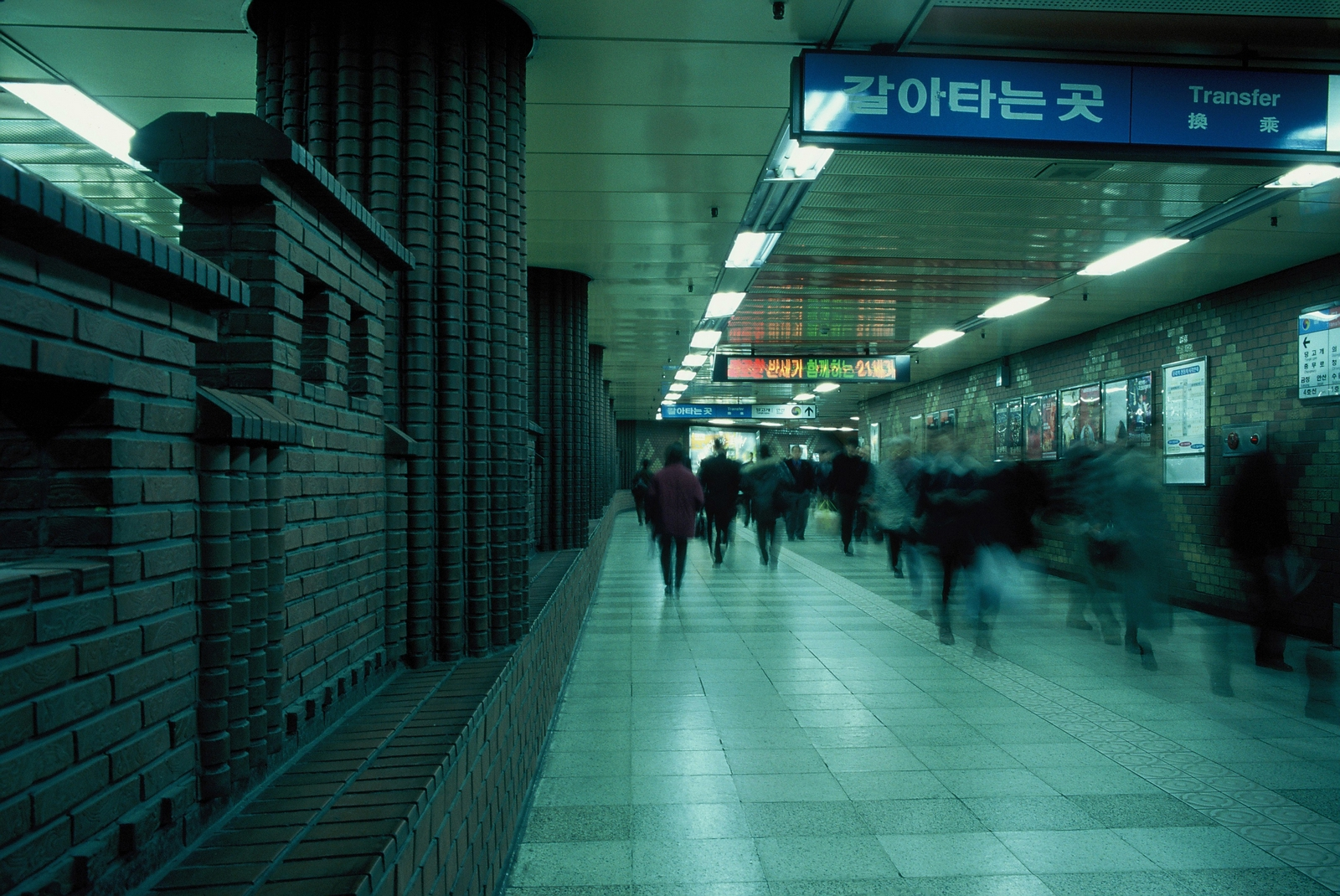
Transfer passage to Line 4 (November 1999)

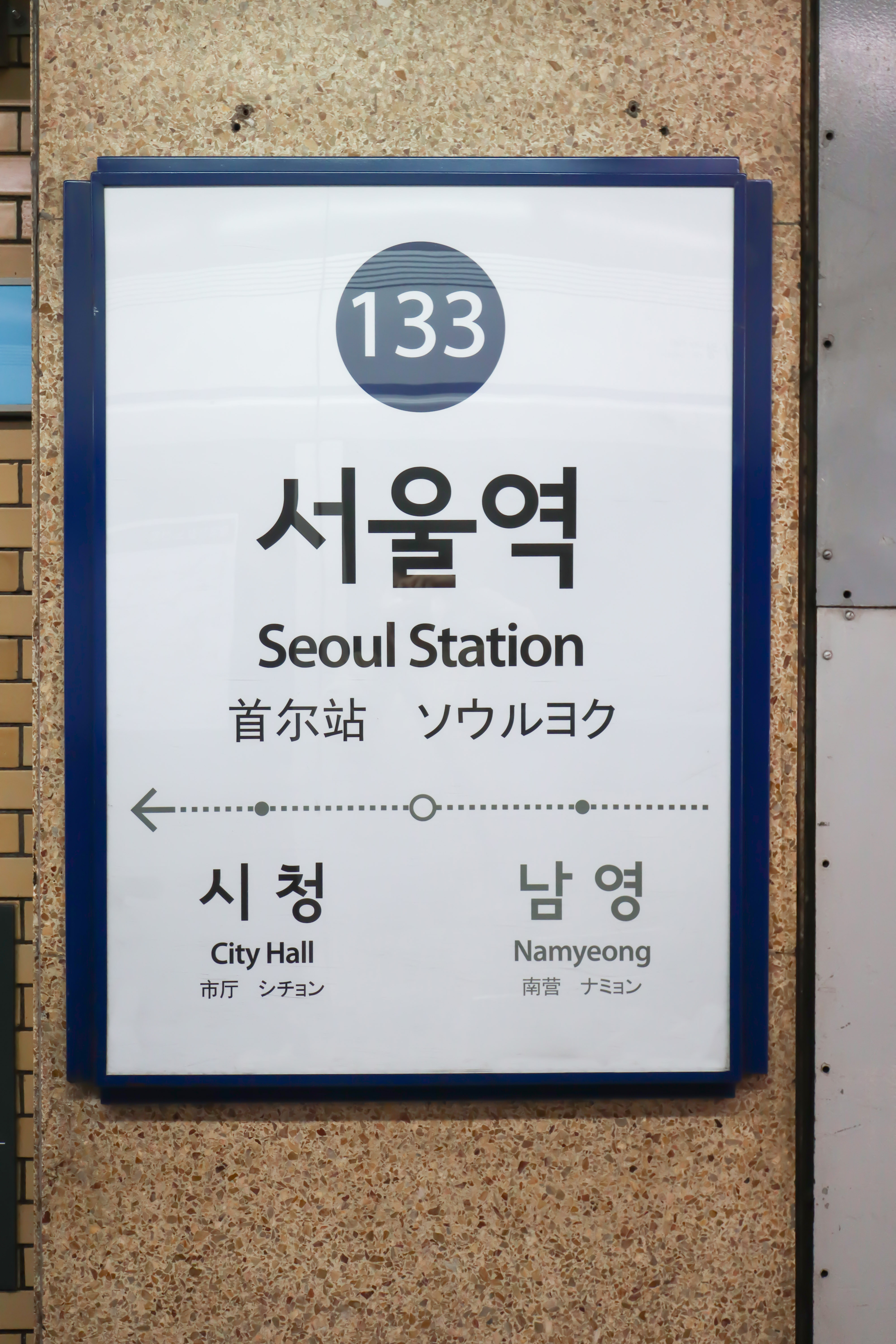
Line 1 Seoul Station station sign

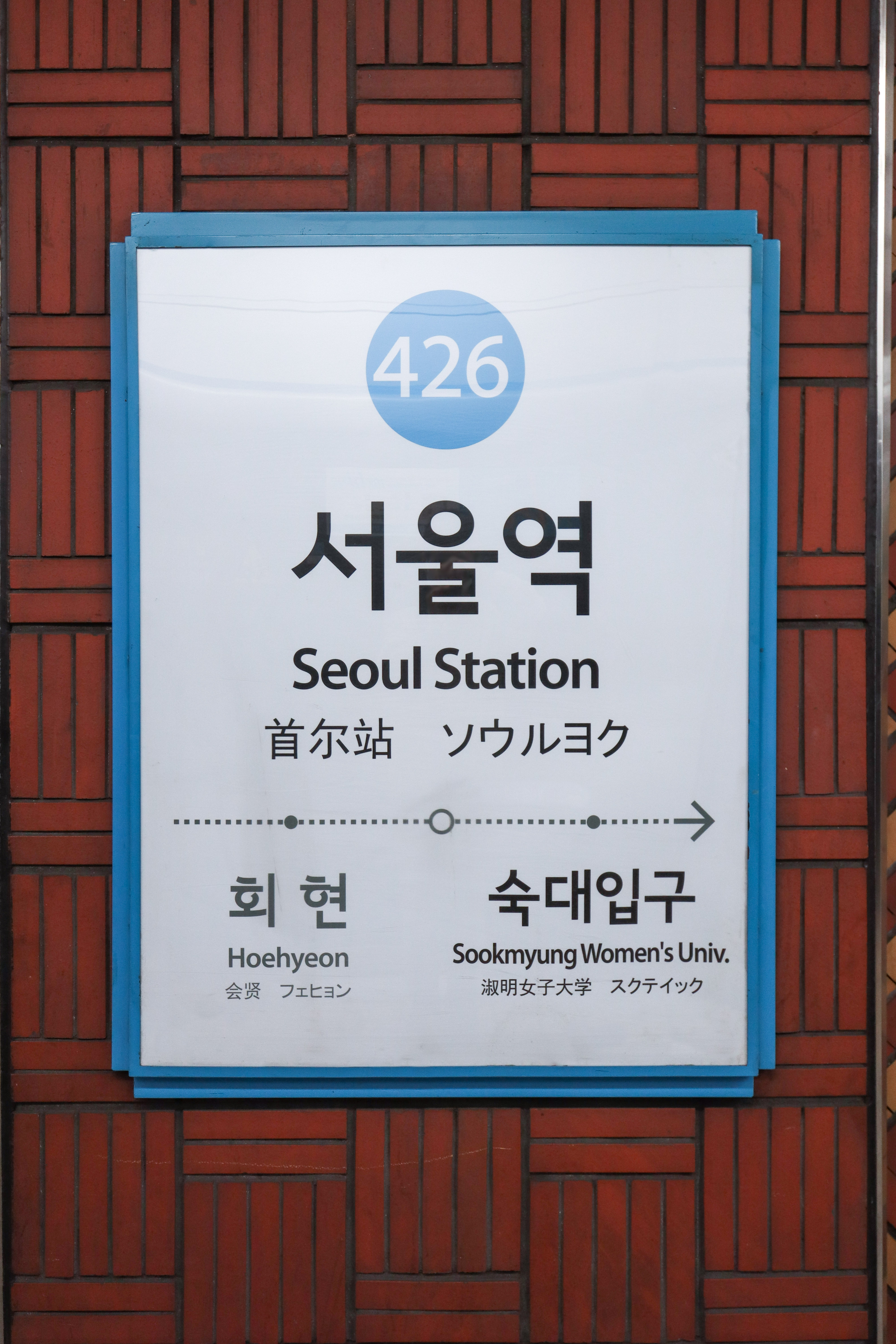
Line 4 Seoul Station station sign

=== GTX-A ===
서울역; Seoul Station
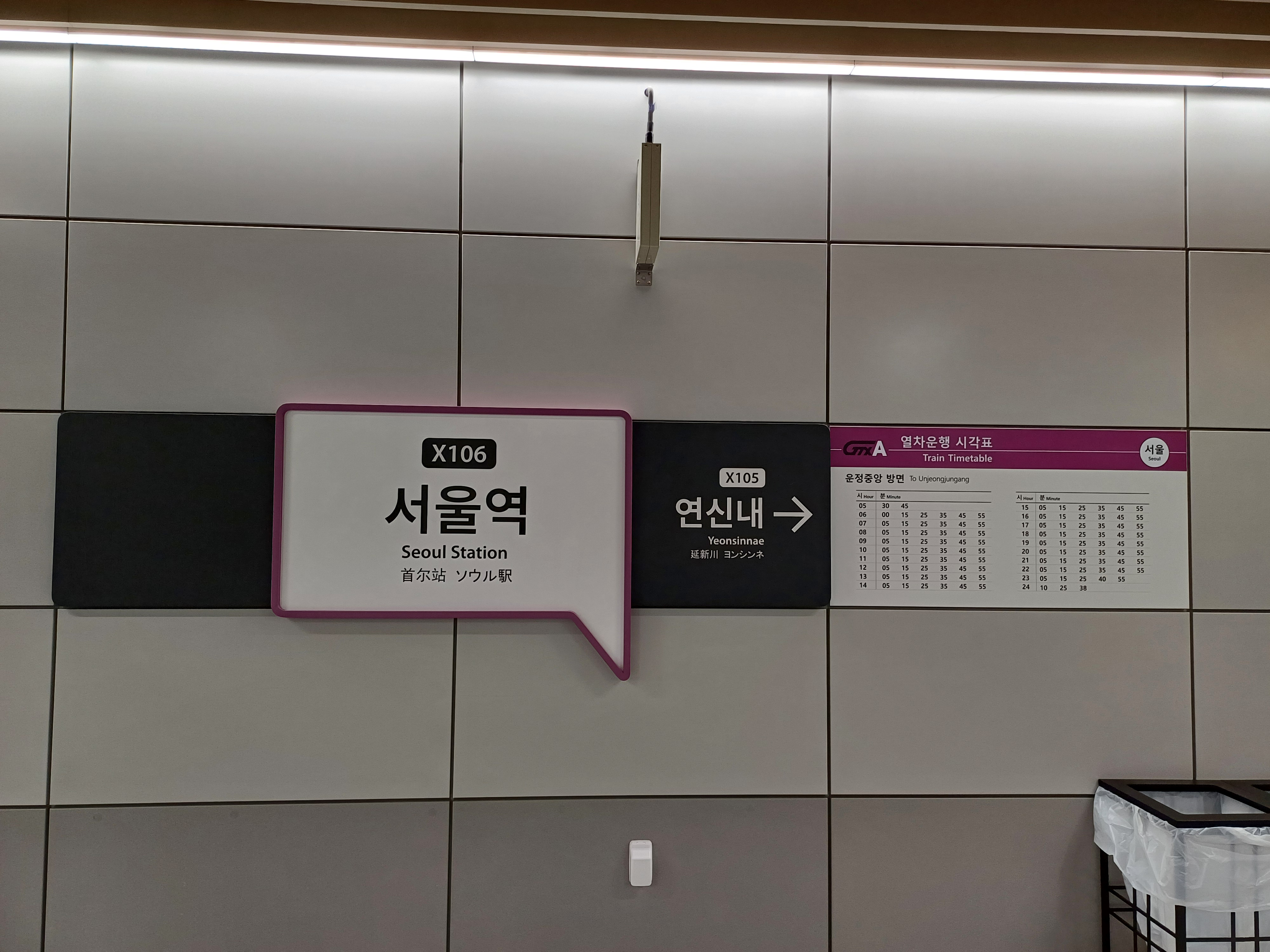
- GTX-A Seoul station sign

General information
- Location: 405 Hangang-daero, Yongsan-gu; Seoul
- Operator: GTX-A Operation
- Line: GTX-A
- Platforms: 2 (side)
- Tracks: 2

Construction
- Structure type: Underground

History
- Opened: December 28, 2024

Services
Preceding station	Seoul Metropolitan Subway	Following station
Yeonsinnae towards Unjeongjungang	GTX-A	Terminus
Location

== Old Seoul Station ==
The old Seoul Station (Korean: 구서울역사; Hanja: 舊서울驛舍, literally meaning "old Seoul Station building"), also known as "Culture Station Seoul 284" (Korean: 문화역서울 284), originally named Keijō (Gyeongseong) station and designed by Tsukamoto Yasushi of Tokyo Imperial University, was finished in November 1925. This red brick building, designed in an eclectic style, features a Byzantine-style central dome and a centralized and symmetrical layout. The floor of the Central Hall on the ground floor was covered with granite and the walls were covered with man-made stone. The wooden floor inside the building's VIP Lounge was covered with birch wood and a western style restaurant was located on the 2nd floor.

On September 25, 1981, the old station was designated as Historic Site 284. A restoration project of the old station began in September 2007 to "transform the former Seoul Station, which had lost its functionality as a train station since the opening of the new KTX station, into a premier national multidisciplinary cultural facility". On the same year, the management was transferred from the Cultural Heritage Administration to the Ministry of Culture, Sports and Tourism. After the design for former Seoul Station's remodeling was developed in 2009, the remodeling construction began.

On August 9, 2011, the station was reopened as a culture complex with its original exterior, after a two-year restoration project by the Ministry of Culture, Sports and Tourism and the state-run Korea Craft and Design Foundation (KCDF). On April 2, 2012, "Culture Seoul Station 284" was officially launched "as a space for diverse artistic and cultural creation and exchange". The official name, which combines the station's historic, spatial, and urban symbolisms, was selected through a national open call. By combining the notion of a cultural space with the old Seoul Station's historic site number 284, the name aims to embody the concepts of preserving its appearance and value as a historic site while simultaneously cultivating the meaning of the station as a place of various cultural intersections. The restored station is a 9,202m^{2} building with two stories above ground and one story below ground level. The former station, before the renovation, has the main lobby, a waiting room, and a VIP room on the first floor, and a barber shop and restaurants on the second floor. Post-renovation, the first floor contains a venue for performances, exhibitions and events, and a multipurpose hall on the floor above.

Old Seoul Station (Keijō Station) 구서울역사
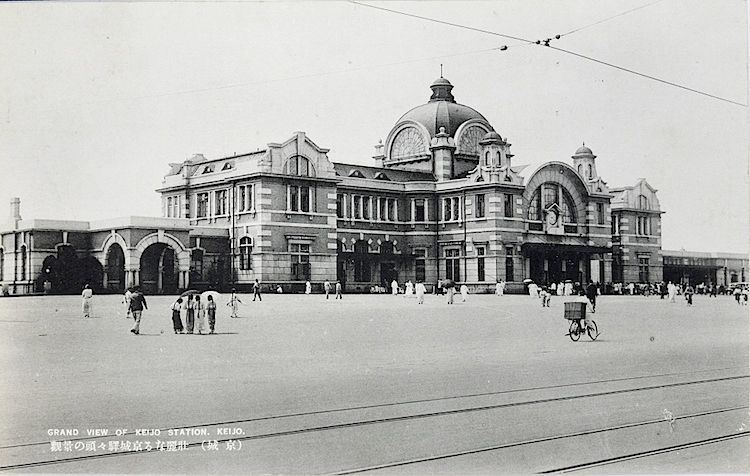
- Old Seoul Station, in 1924

General information
- Other names: Culture Station Seoul 284
- Location: 1 Tongil-ro, Bongnaedong 2(i)-ga, Jung-gu, Seoul
- Coordinates: 37.5559°N 126.9716°E
- Operator: Chōsen Government Railway (1925-1945); Korea National Railroad (1945-1988)

History
- Opened: September 30, 1925
- Closed: September 12, 1988
- Former names: Keijō (Gyeongseong); Seoul (1925-1988)
Location

== Gallery ==
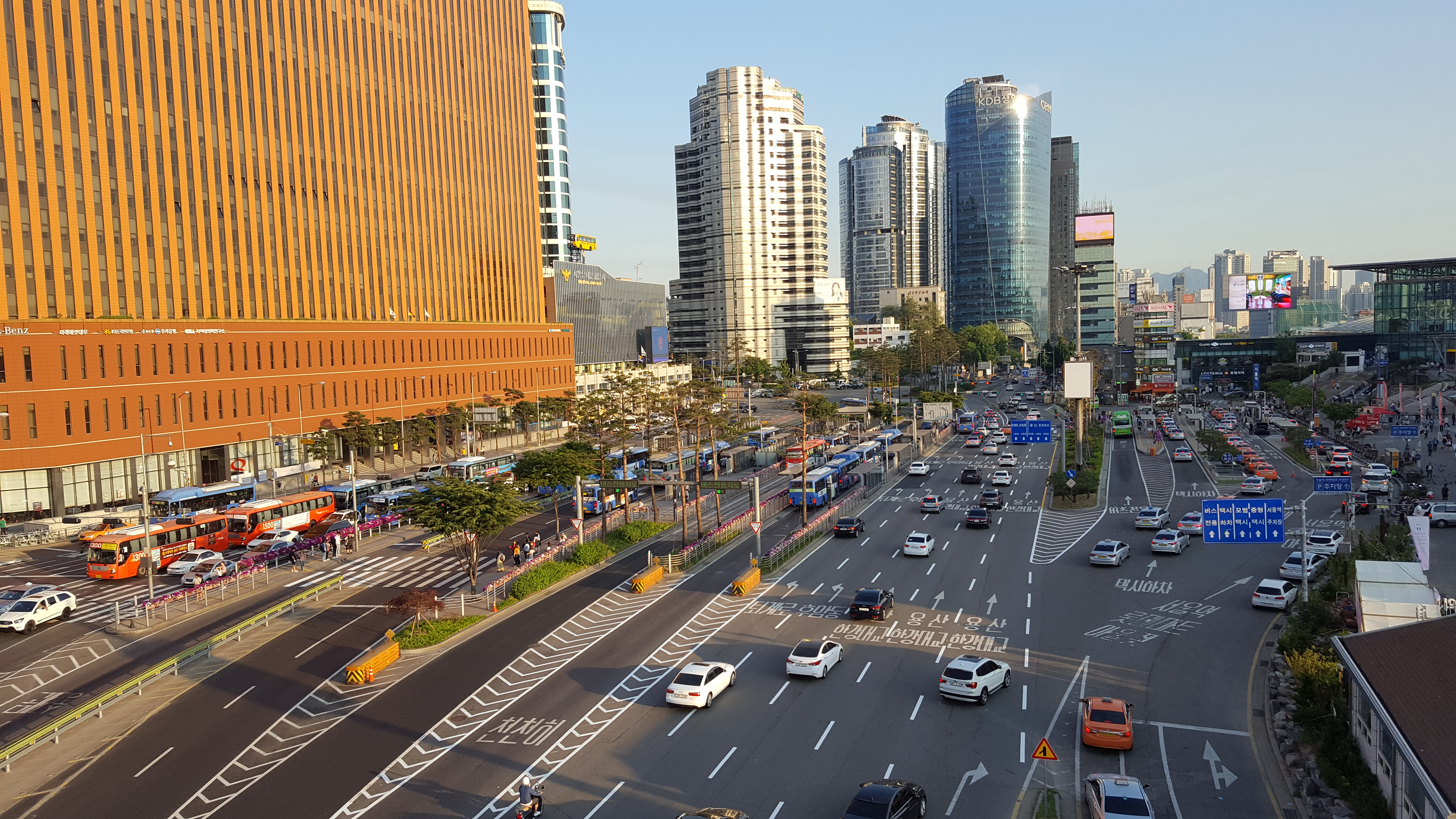
Seoul station and former Daewoo Group headquarters building

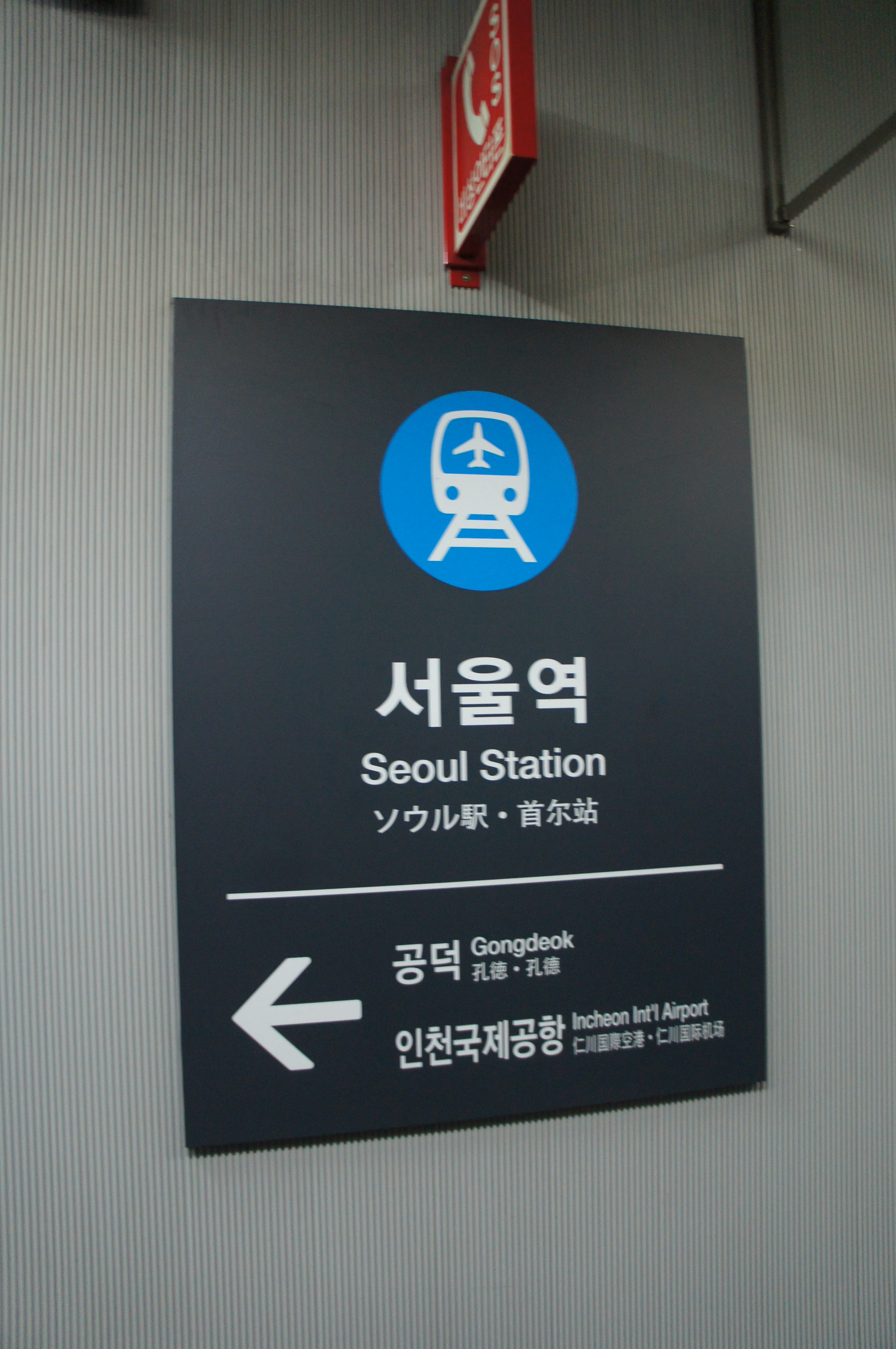
AREX Seoul station sign

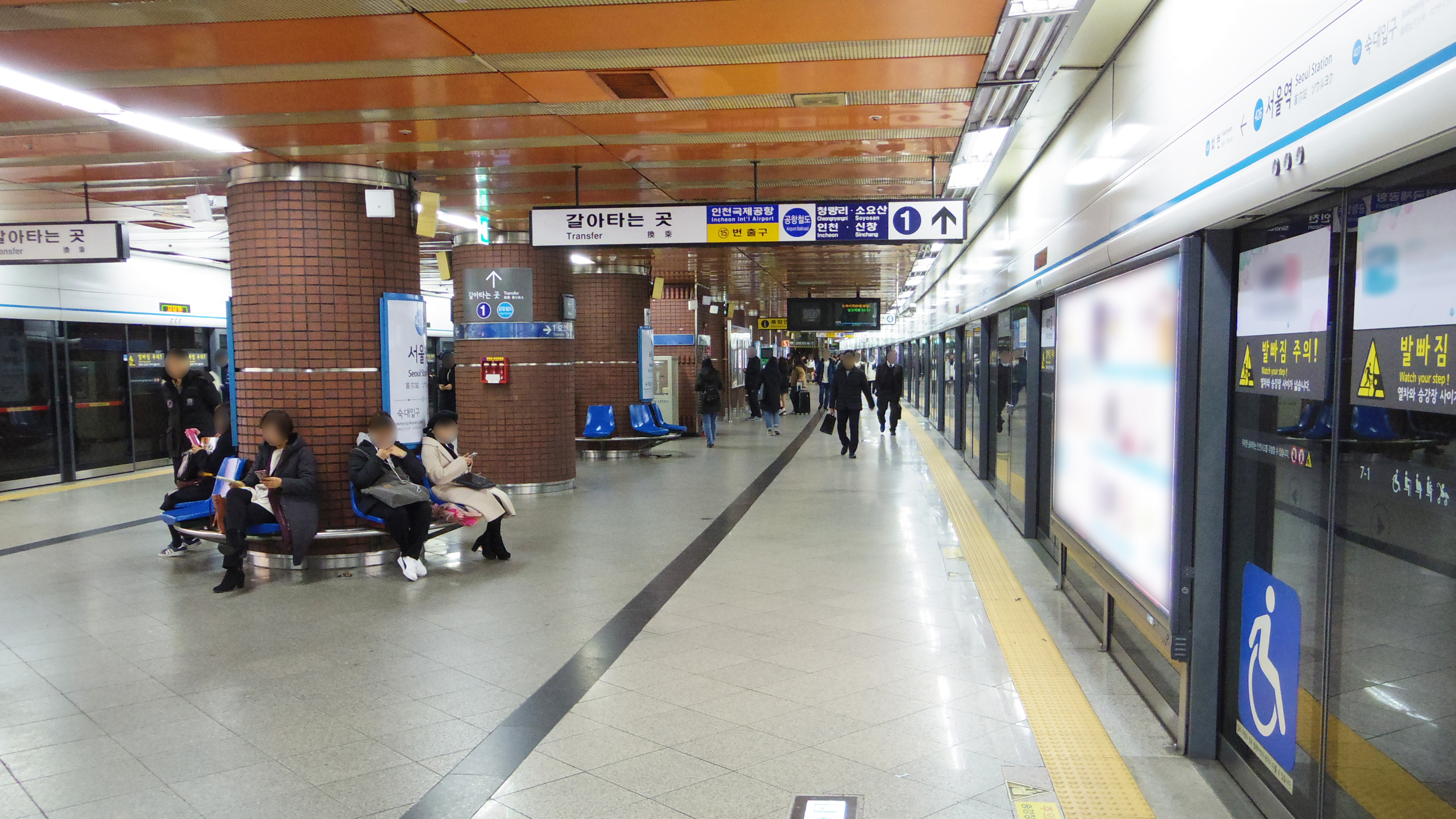
Station Platform (Line 4)

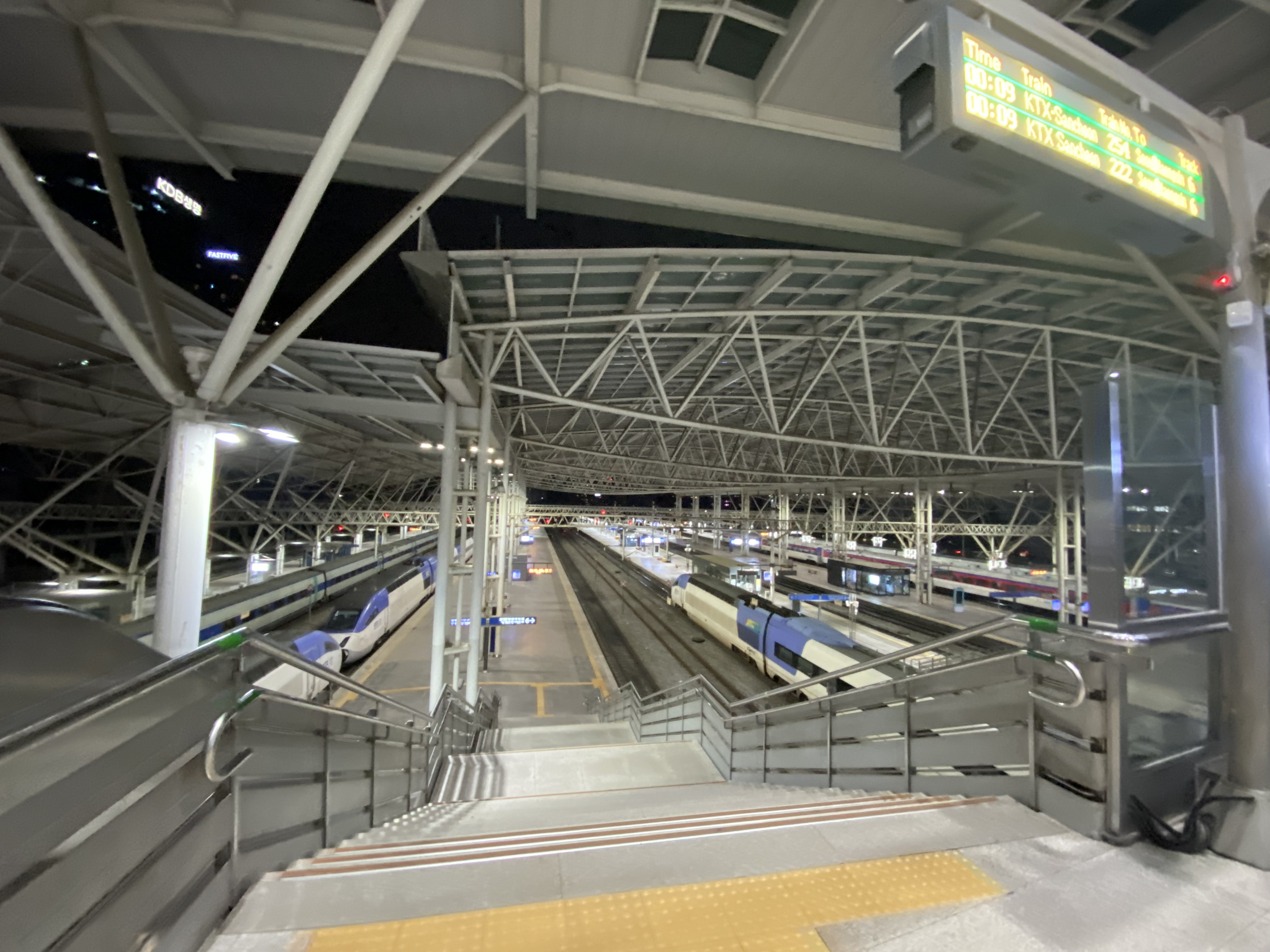
The KTX's platform at midnight

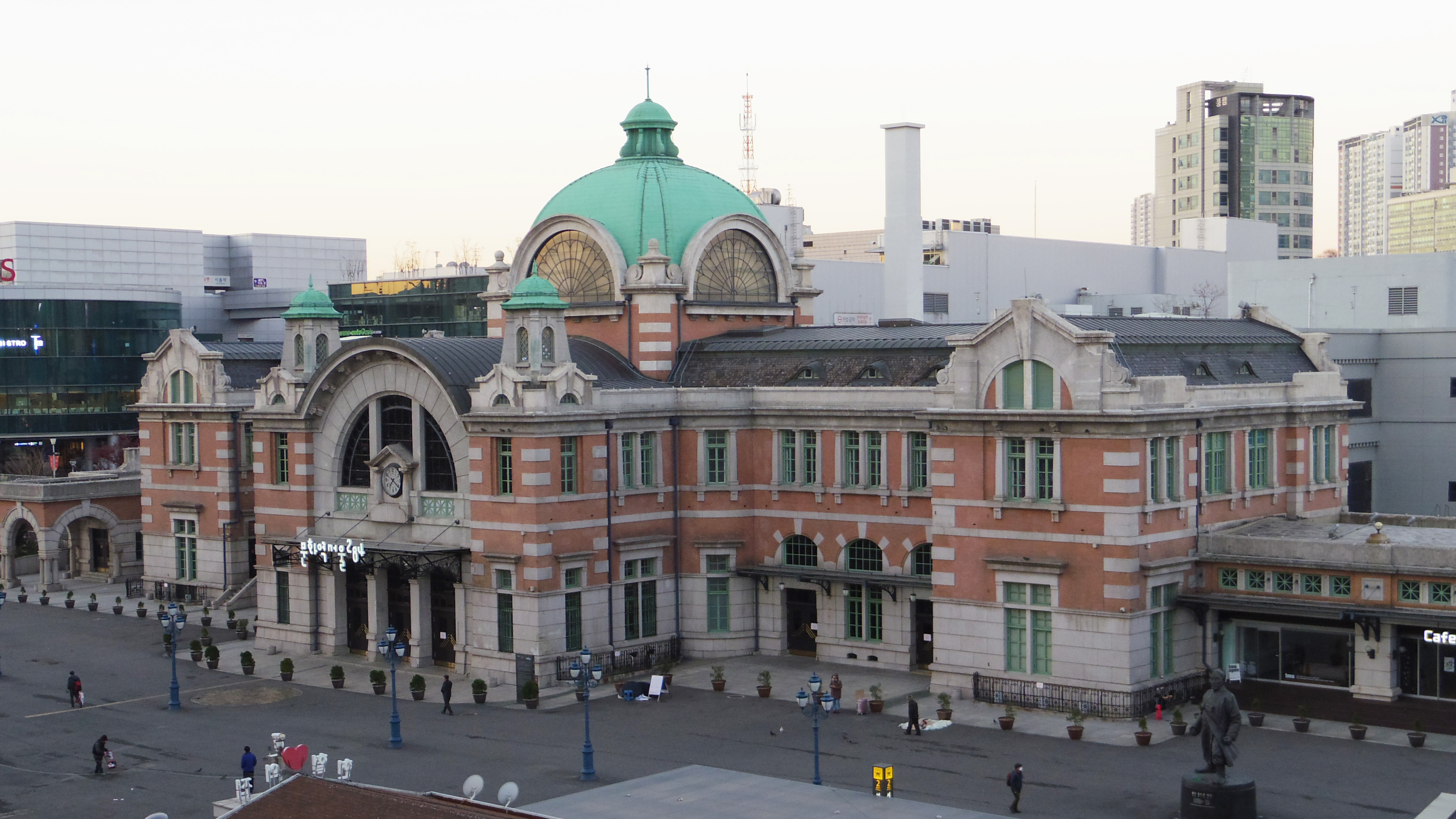
Old Seoul Station

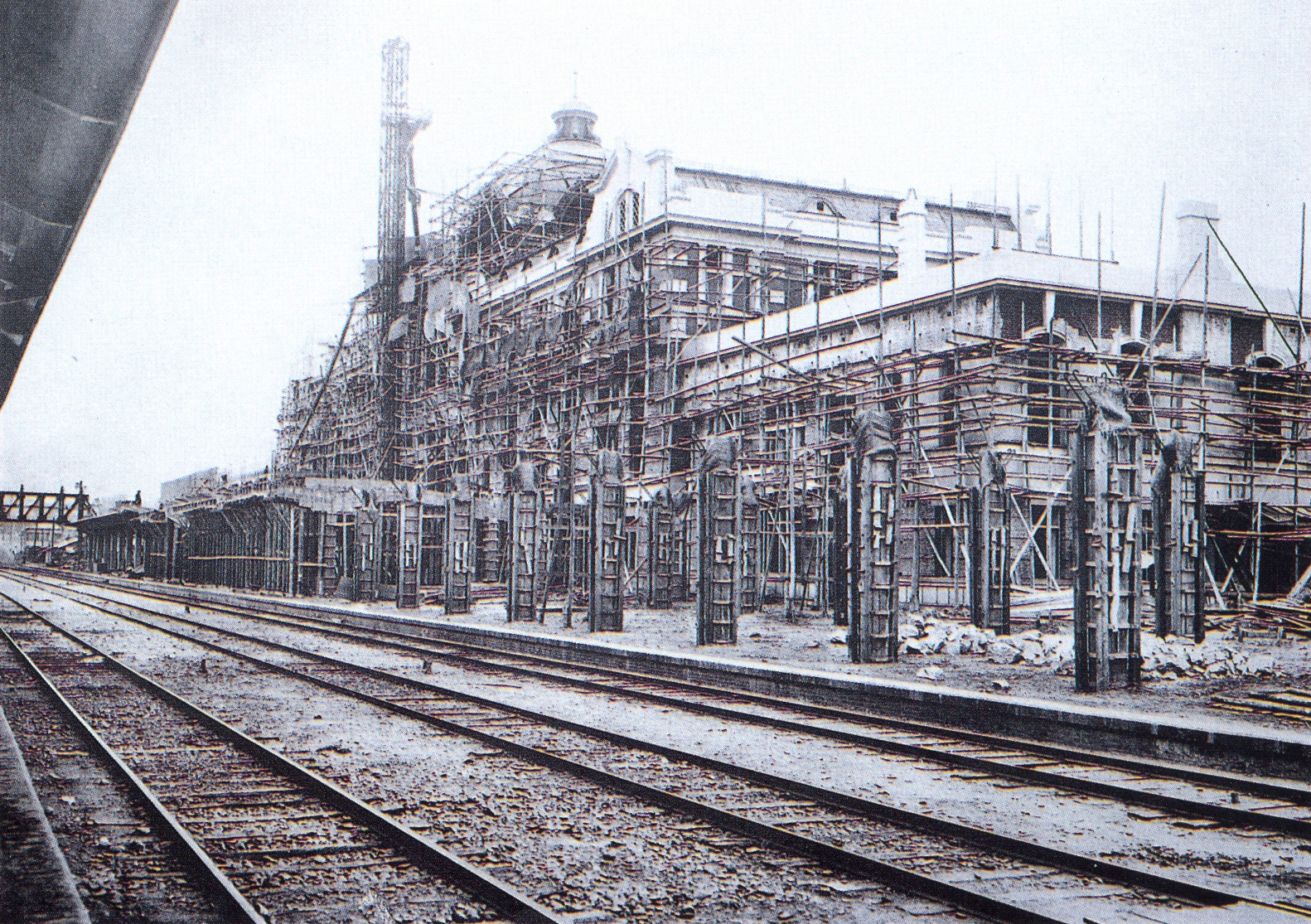
Construction of the original station in 1924

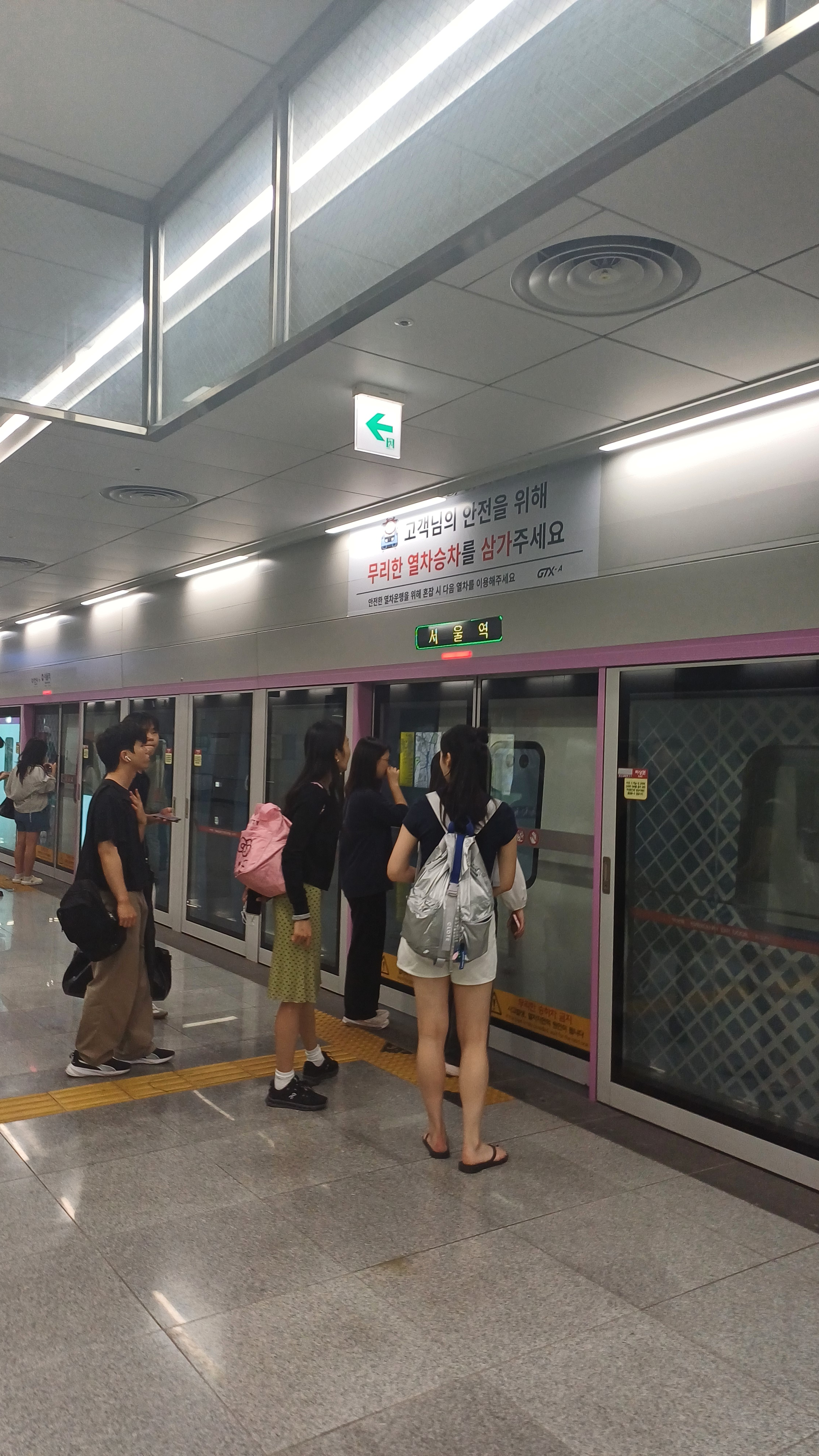
Station Platform (GTX-A)

== See also ==
- Transportation in South Korea
- Seoul Station City Airport Terminal
