= Bongnae-dong =

Neighborhood in Seoul, South Korea

Coordinates: 37.559°N 126.972°E

- Interactive map of Bongnae-dong
- Country: South Korea

Area
  - Total: 0.13 km^{2} (0.050 sq mi)

Korean name
- Hangul: 봉래동
- Hanja: 蓬萊洞
- RR: Bongnae-dong
- MR: Pongnae-dong

Bongnae-dong (Korean: 봉래동) is a legal dong (neighborhood) of Jung District, Seoul, South Korea and governed by its administrative dongs, Sogong-dong and Hoehyeon-dong.

Global Logistics System Co., Ltd., the Jungsuck Educational Foundation, and the Korea Research Foundation for the 21st Century are in the Hanil Building in Bongnae-dong.

== See also ==
- Administrative divisions of South Korea
