= Garwol-dong =

- Interactive map of Garwol-dong
- Country: South Korea

Area
  - Total: 0.29 km^{2} (0.11 sq mi)

Korean name
- Hangul: 갈월동
- Hanja: 葛月洞
- RR: Garwol-dong
- MR: Karwŏl-tong

Garwol-dong (Korean: 갈월동) is a dong (neighborhood) of Yongsan District, Seoul, South Korea. It is a legal dong (법정동 法定洞) administered by its administrative dong (행정동 行政洞), Namyeong-dong.

== See also ==
- Administrative divisions of South Korea
