= Seoul City Route 71 =

Road in South Korea

Seoul Special Metropolitan City Route 71
- 서울특별시도 제71호선

Route information
- Length: 18.7 km (11.6 mi)

Major junctions
- From: Prefectural Route 342 in Songpa District, Seoul
- To: Bukbu Expressway in Jungnang District, Seoul

Location
- Country: South Korea

Highway system
- Highway systems of South Korea; Expressways; National; Local

Seoul Metropolitan City Route 71 (Korean: 서울특별시도 제71호선) is an urban road located in Seoul, South Korea. With a total length of 18.7 km (11.6 mi), this road starts from the Bokjeong station in Songpa District, Seoul to Sinnae IC in Jungnang District.

== Stopovers ==
Seoul

- Songpa District - Gwangjin District - Jungnang District

== List of Facilities ==
IS: Intersection, IC: Interchange

Road name	Name	Hangul name	Connection	Location		Note
Connected with Seongnam-daero
Songpa-daero	Bokjeong Station IS (Bokjeong station)	복정역 교차로 (복정역)	Prefectural Route 342 (Heolleung-ro)	Seoul	Songpa District	Terminus; National Route 3 overlap
Songpa-daero	Songpa IC	송파 나들목	Seoul Ring Expressway	Seoul	Songpa District	National Route 3 overlap
Songpa-daero	Jangji Bridge IS	장지교 교차로	Tancheondong-ro; Songpa-daero 4-gil	Seoul	Songpa District	National Route 3 overlap
Songpa-daero	Jangji Bridge	장지교		Seoul	Songpa District	National Route 3 overlap
Songpa-daero	Jangji station (GARDEN 5)	장지역 (가든파이브)	Chungmin-ro	Seoul	Songpa District	National Route 3 overlap
Songpa-daero	Munjeong Station IS (Munjeong station)	문정역 교차로 (문정역)	Munjeong-ro	Seoul	Songpa District	National Route 3 overlap
Songpa-daero	Olympic Family Town	올림픽훼밀리타운	Dongnam-ro	Seoul	Songpa District	National Route 3 overlap
Songpa-daero	Garak Market Station IS (Garak Market station) (Central Radio Management Service)	가락시장역 교차로 (가락시장역) (중앙전파관리소)	Jungdae-ro	Seoul	Songpa District	National Route 3 overlap
Songpa-daero	Garak Market IS (Songpa Underpass)	가락시장 교차로 (송파지하차도)	Seoul City Route 92 (Yangjae-daero)	Seoul	Songpa District	National Route 3 overlap
Songpa-daero	Songpa station	송파역		Seoul	Songpa District	National Route 3 overlap
Songpa-daero	Songpa IS	송파사거리	Garak-ro	Seoul	Songpa District	National Route 3 overlap
Songpa-daero	Seokchon Station IS (Seokchon station)	석촌역 교차로 (석촌역)	Baekjegobun-ro	Seoul	Songpa District	National Route 3 overlap
Songpa-daero	Seokchon Lake IS	석촌호수 교차로	Seokchonhosu-ro	Seoul	Songpa District	National Route 3 overlap
Songpa-daero	Jamsil Station IS (Jamsil station)	잠실역 교차로 (잠실역)	Seoul City Route 90 (Olympic-ro)	Seoul	Songpa District	National Route 3 overlap
Songpa-daero	Jamsil Bridge IC (South)	잠실대교 남단	Olympic-ro 35-gil	Seoul	Songpa District	National Route 3 overlap
Songpa-daero	Jamsil Bridge JCT	잠실대교 분기점	Seoul City Route 88 (Olympic-daero)	Seoul	Songpa District	National Route 3 overlap
Songpa-daero	Jamsil Bridge	잠실대교		Seoul	Songpa District	National Route 3 overlap
Jayang-ro	Jamsil Bridge			Seoul	Gwangjin District	National Route 3 overlap
Jayang-ro	Jamsil Bridge IC (North)	잠실대교 북단	National Route 46; Seoul City Route 70 (Gangbyeonbuk-ro)	Seoul	Gwangjin District	National Route 3 overlap
Jayang-ro	Jamsil Bridge IS (North)	잠실대교북단 교차로	Ttukseom-ro	Seoul	Gwangjin District	National Route 3 overlap
Jayang-ro	Jayang IS	자양사거리	Achasan-ro	Seoul	Gwangjin District	National Route 3 overlap
Jayang-ro	Gwangjin District Office Seoul Gwangjin Police Station	광진구청 서울광진경찰서		Seoul	Gwangjin District	National Route 3 overlap
Jayang-ro	Guui IS	구의사거리	Seoul City Route 60 (Gwangnaru-ro)	Seoul	Gwangjin District	National Route 3 overlap
Jayang-ro	Achasan Station IS	아차산역사거리	Seoul City Route 50 (Cheonho-daero)	Seoul	Gwangjin District	National Route 3 overlap Seoul City Route 50 overlap
Cheonho-daero	Achasan Station IS		Seoul City Route 50 (Cheonho-daero)	Seoul	Gwangjin District	National Route 3 overlap Seoul City Route 50 overlap
Cheonho-daero	Achasan station	아차산역		Seoul	Gwangjin District	National Route 3 overlap Seoul City Route 50 overlap
Cheonho-daero	Achasan Station IS	아차산역삼거리	National Route 3 Seoul City Route 50 (Cheonho-daero)	Seoul	Gwangjin District	National Route 3 overlap Seoul City Route 50 overlap
Yongmasan-ro	Achasan Station IS		National Route 3 Seoul City Route 50 (Cheonho-daero)	Seoul	Gwangjin District	National Route 3 overlap Seoul City Route 50 overlap
Yongmasan-ro	Sinseong Market Entrance	신성시장입구	Yeonghwasa-ro; Yongmasan-ro 7-gil	Seoul	Gwangjin District	
Yongmasan-ro	Junggok IS	중곡사거리	Gingorang-ro	Seoul	Gwangjin District	
Yongmasan-ro	Yonggok IS	용곡삼거리	Neungdong-ro	Seoul	Gwangjin District	
Yongmasan-ro	Yongmasan station Yongmasan Overpass	용마산역 용마고가교		Seoul	Jungnang District	
Yongmasan-ro	Yongma Hanshin Apartment IS	용마한신아파트 교차로	Sagajeong-ro	Seoul	Jungnang District	
Yongmasan-ro	Junghwa Middle School	중화중학교		Seoul	Jungnang District	
Yongmasan-ro	Junghwa Middle School IS	중화중교 교차로	Sangbong-ro	Seoul	Jungnang District	
Yongmasan-ro	Gyeomjae IS	겸재삼거리	Gyeomjae-ro; Yongmasan-ro 96-gil	Seoul	Jungnang District	
Yongmasan-ro	Mangu 3-dong Community Center	망우3동주민센터		Seoul	Jungnang District	
Yongmasan-ro	Urim IS	우림시장 교차로	Bongujae-ro; Yongmagongwon-ro	Seoul	Jungnang District	
Yongmasan-ro	Mangu IS	망우사거리	National Route 6 National Route 47 (Mangu-ro)	Seoul	Jungnang District	National Route 47 overlap
Yongmasan-ro	Neungsan Underpass	능산지하차도		Seoul	Jungnang District	National Route 47 overlap
Yongmasan-ro	Neungsan IS	능산삼거리	Bonghwasan-ro	Seoul	Jungnang District	National Route 47 overlap
Yongmasan-ro	Sinnae IC	신내 나들목	Bukbu Expressway	Seoul	Jungnang District	National Route 47 overlap
Connected with Gyeongchunbuk-ro
