= Garak =

Garak may refer to:

== Places ==
- Garak, Iran (disambiguation)
- Garak-dong, a neighborhood of Songpa-gu, Seoul, South Korea
  - Garak Market, an extensive farmers fish market in the neighborhood of Garak-dong
  - Garak Market station, a station on the Seoul Subway Line 8
- Gaya confederacy (also Garak), a confederacy of territorial polities in the Nakdong River basin of southern Korea

== Other uses ==
- Elim Garak, a fictional character from the television series Star Trek: Deep Space Nine
- garak, an LLM vulnerability scanner

== See also ==
- Gerak, a recurring alien character from the TV series Stargate SG-1
