= Seoul City Route 31 (Trunk) =

Road in South Korea

Seoul Special Metropolitan City Route 31
- 서울특별시도 제31호선
- Jangji - Seongsu Line

Route information
- Length: 11.73 km (7.29 mi)

Major junctions
- From: Songpa District, Seoul
- To: Seongdong District, Seoul

Location
- Country: South Korea

Highway system
- Highway systems of South Korea; Expressways; National; Local

Seoul Metropolitan City Route 31 (Korean: 서울특별시도 제31호선) is a trunk road located in Seoul, South Korea. With a total length of 11.73 km (7.29 mi), this road starts from the Jangji-dong in Songpa District, Seoul to Seongsu-dong 1-ga in Seongdong District.

== Stopovers ==
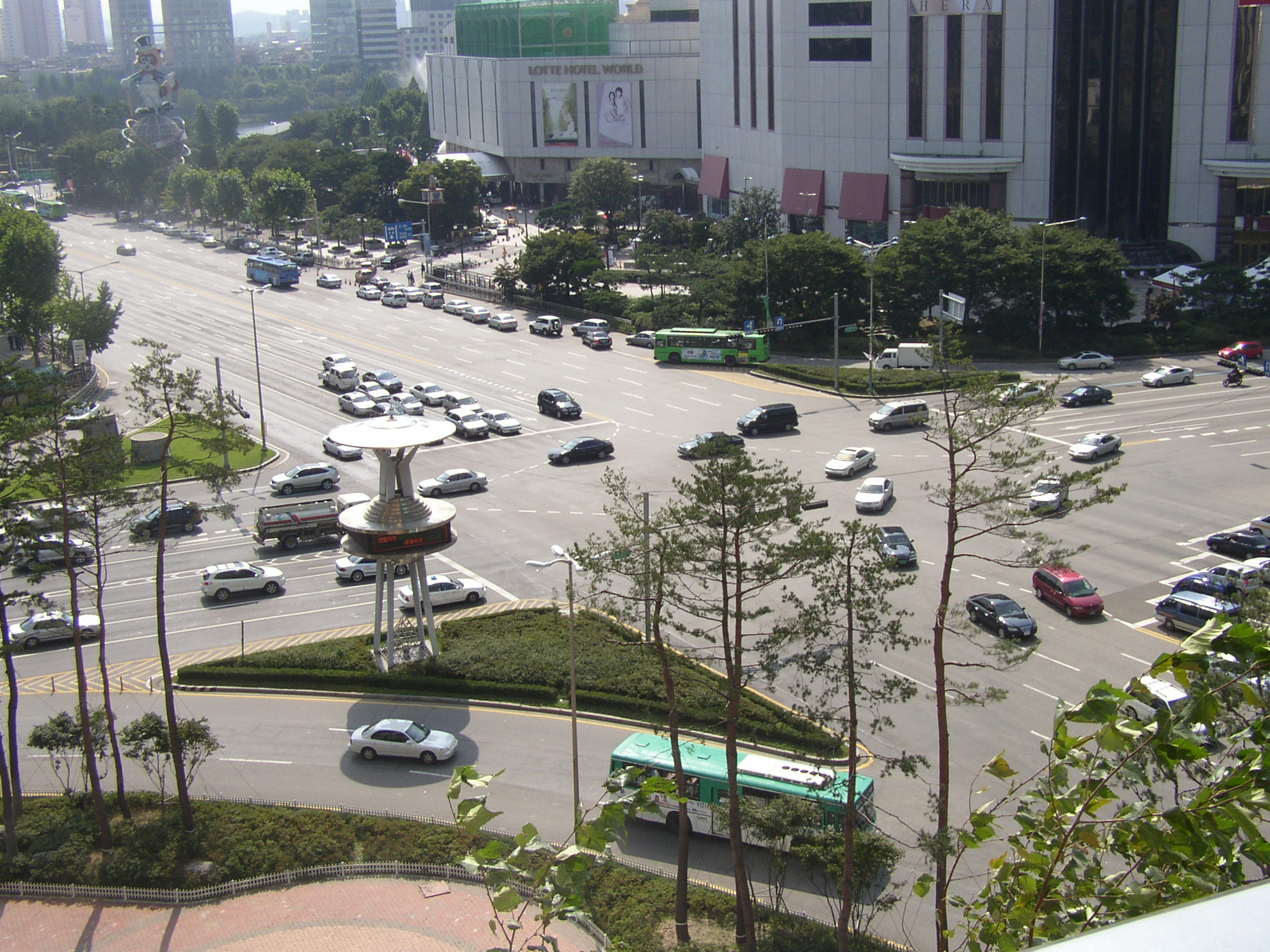
Jamsil Station Intersection.

Seoul

- Songpa District - Gwangjin District - Seongdong District

== List of Facilities ==
IS: Intersection, IC: Interchange

Road name	Name	Hangul name	Connection	Location		Note
Connected with National Route 3 (Seongnam-daero)
Songpa-daero	Bokjeong station IS	복정역 교차로	Seoul City Route 27 (Heolleung-ro); Prefectural Route 342 (Heolleung-ro)	Seoul	Songpa District	
Songpa-daero	Songpa IC	송파 나들목	Seoul Ring Expressway	Seoul	Songpa District	
Songpa-daero	Jangji Bridge IS	장지교 교차로	Seoul City Route 3102 (Tancheondong-ro); Wiryejungang-ro	Seoul	Songpa District	
Songpa-daero	Jangji Bridge	장지교		Seoul	Songpa District	Jangjicheon
Songpa-daero	Jangji station	장지역	Chungmin-ro	Seoul	Songpa District	
Songpa-daero	Geonyeong Apartment IS	건영아파트앞 사거리	Saemal-ro	Seoul	Songpa District	
Songpa-daero	Munjeong station IS	문정역 교차로	Munjeong-ro	Seoul	Songpa District	
Songpa-daero	Olympic Family Town IS	올림픽훼밀리타운 교차로	Dongnam-ro	Seoul	Songpa District	
Songpa-daero	Garak Market station IS	가락시장역 교차로	Seoul City Route 4101 (Jungdae-ro)	Seoul	Songpa District	
Songpa-daero	Garak Market IS	가락시장 교차로	Seoul City Route 42 (Yangjae-daero)	Seoul	Songpa District	Songpa Underpass section
Songpa-daero	Songpa station	송파역		Seoul	Songpa District	
Songpa-daero	Songpa IS	송파사거리	Garak-ro	Seoul	Songpa District	
Songpa-daero	Seokchon station IS	석촌역 교차로	Seoul City Route 0501 (Baekjegobun-ro)	Seoul	Songpa District	
Songpa-daero	Seokchon Lake IS	석촌호수 교차로	Seokchonhosu-ro	Seoul	Songpa District	
Songpa-daero	Jamsil Lake Bridge	잠실호수교		Seoul	Songpa District	Seokchon Lake Park
Songpa-daero	Seokchon Lake IS	석촌호수 교차로	Jamsil-ro	Seoul	Songpa District	
Songpa-daero	Jamsil station IS	잠실역 교차로	Seoul City Route 44 (Olympic-ro)	Seoul	Songpa District	
Songpa-daero	Jamsil Bridge IC	잠실대교남단	Seoul City Route 3105 (Olympic-ro 35-gil)	Seoul	Songpa District	
Songpa-daero	Jamsil Bridge JCT	잠실대교분기점	Seoul City Route 05 (Olympic-daero); Hangaram-ro	Seoul	Songpa District	
Songpa-daero	Jamsil Bridge	잠실대교		Seoul	Songpa District	
Songpa-daero	Jamsil Bridge			Seoul	Gwangjin District	
Songpa-daero	Jamsil Bridge IC	잠실대교북단	National Route 46 (Gangbyeonbuk-ro); Seoul City Route 04 (Gangbyeonbuk-ro)	Seoul	Gwangjin District	
Jayang-ro	Jamsil Bridge IC		National Route 46 (Gangbyeonbuk-ro); Seoul City Route 04 (Gangbyeonbuk-ro)	Seoul	Gwangjin District	
Jayang-ro	Jamsil Bridge IC	잠실대교북단	Seoul City Route 3111 (Ttukseom-ro)	Seoul	Gwangjin District	
Jayang-ro	Jayang IS (Guui station)	자양사거리 (구의역)		Seoul	Gwangjin District	
Achasan-ro	Jayang IS (Guui station)			Seoul	Gwangjin District	
Achasan-ro	(Unnamed)	(명칭미상)	Jayanggangbyeon-ro	Seoul	Gwangjin District	
Achasan-ro	(Konkuk University)	(건국대학교)	Achasan-ro 36-gil	Seoul	Gwangjin District	
Achasan-ro	Konkuk University station IS (Konkuk University Medical Center)	건대입구역 교차로 (건국대학교병원)	Seoul City Route 0405 (Neungdong-ro)	Seoul	Gwangjin District	Subway station
Achasan-ro	Seongsu IS	성수사거리	National Route 47 (Tongil-ro); Seoul City Route 32 (Dongil-ro)	Seoul	Gwangjin District	
Achasan-ro	Seongsu IS		National Route 47 (Tongil-ro); Seoul City Route 32 (Dongil-ro)	Seoul	Seongdong District	
Achasan-ro	Seongsu station	성수역	Seongsui-ro	Seoul	Seongdong District	Subway station
Achasan-ro	Kyungdong Elementary School IS	경동초등학교입구 교차로	Seongsuil-ro	Seoul	Seongdong District	
Achasan-ro	Ttukseom station	뚝섬역		Seoul	Seongdong District	Subway station
Achasan-ro	Ttukseom Station IS	뚝섬역 교차로	Wangsimni-ro	Seoul	Seongdong District	
Wangsimni-ro	Ttukseom Station IS		Wangsimni-ro	Seoul	Seongdong District	
Wangsimni-ro	Seongdong Bridge IS	성동교 교차로	Seoul City Route 48 (Gwangnaru-ro); Seoul City Route 3001 (Gwangnaru-ro)	Seoul	Seongdong District	
Connected with Seoul City Route 48 (Gwangnaru-ro)
