= Xinjian =

Xinjian (Chinese: 新建) may refer to these places in China:

- Xinjian District, a suburban district of Nanchang, Jiangxi

== Towns ==
- Xinjian, Guizhou, in Fenggang County, Guizhou
- Xinjian, Hunan, in Zhongfang County, Hunan
- Xinjian, Jiangsu, in Yixing, Jiangsu
- Xinjian, Zhejiang, in Jinyun County, Zhejiang

== Townships ==
- Xinjian Township, Ningnan County, in Ningnan County, Sichuan
- Xinjian Township, Yingjing County, in Yingjing County, Sichuan

== Subdistricts ==
- Xinjian Subdistrict, Qiqihar, in Ang'angxi District, Qiqihar, Heilongjiang
- Xinjian Subdistrict, Baishan, in Hunjiang District, Baishan, Jilin
- Xinjian Subdistrict, Jilin City, in Changyi District, Jilin City, Jilin
- Xinjian Subdistrict, Yingkou, in Zhanqian District, Yingkou, Liaoning
- Xinjian Subdistrict, Jinzhong, in Yuci District, Jinzhong, Shanxi
- Xinjian Subdistrict, Nanchong, in Shunqing District, Nanchong, Sichuan

== See also ==
- Xinjiang, an autonomous region of China
- Xinjiang (disambiguation)
