= Munjeong =

Munjeong may refer to any of the listed ones.

- Queen Munjeong, third queen consort of King Jungjong of Joseon
- Munjeong-dong, a dong (neighbourhood) of Songpa-gu, Seoul, South Korea
- Munjeong station, subway station near Munjeong-dong
- Munjeong-dong Rodeo Street, located in Munjeong-dong, a big shopping district in South Korea
