= Xianjing =

Xianjing may refer to

- Xianjing, Zhuzhou, township in Zhuzhou County, Zhuzhou City, Hunan, China
- Xiānjìng, the place where Xian ("fairies" or "immortals") reside in Chinese mythology
- Xiànjǐng or "snare", an element in the Chinese board game Jungle

== People with the given name ==
- Princess Xianjing (1085–1115), a daughter of Emperor Shenzong of Song
- Lü Xianjing (born 1998), Chinese cyclist

== See also ==
- Xinjiang, a provincial-level autonomous region of China
- Xinjing (disambiguation)
