= Changqi =

Changqi may refer to:

- Changqi, Hongjiang (长碛村), a village in Longtian Township, Hongjiang City, Hunan, China
- Changqi, Guizhou (长碛村), village in Xinjian Township, Fenggang County, Zunyi City, Guizhou, China
- Changqi, Guangzhou (长岐镇), town in Huazhou, Maoming, Guangzhou, China; see List of township-level divisions of Guangdong#Huazhou
- Ying Changqi (1917–1997), Taiwanese industrialist and Go promoter
- Chang Qi, a fictional character in Chapter 67 of the Romance of the Three Kingdoms
- Changqi Cup, Chinese Go tournament

== See also ==
- Janggi (also spelled changgi), Korean board game
- Jangji-dong, a neighbourhood of Seoul
- Changji (disambiguation)
- Nagasaki, a Japanese city
