= Bundang-Suseo Urban Expressway =

- 분당수서도시고속도로

Route information
- Length: 25.338 km (15.744 mi)
- Existed: 1996–present

Major junctions
- South end: Bundang District, Seongnam, Gyeonggi Province
- North end: Sujeong District, Seongnam, Gyeonggi Province

Location
- Country: South Korea

Highway system
- Highway systems of South Korea; Expressways; National; Local

The Bundang-Suseo Urban Expressway (Korean: 분당수서도시고속도로; Bundang Suseo Dosi Gosok Doro), is an urban expressway in South Korea, connecting Bundang-gu to Sujeong-gu in Seongnam, Gyeonggi Province.

== Main stopovers ==
Gyeonggi Province

- Seongnam (Bundang-gu - Jungwon-gu - Sujeong-gu)

== Composition ==
- Notes
  - IC : Interchange
  - IS : Intersection
- (■): Motorway section

Type	Name	Korean name	Connection	Location		Notes
IS	Agricultural and Marine Products Center IS	농수산물센터사거리	Yonggu-daero; Seongnam-daero; Seongnam-daero 2beon-gil	Seongnam	Bundang District	Terminus
	Seongnam Agricultural and Marine Products Center	성남농수산물센터		Seongnam	Bundang District	
IS	Kyunggi Express IS	경기고속삼거리	Tancheonsang-ro	Seongnam	Bundang District	
BR	Dongmakcheon 1 Bridge	동막천1교		Seongnam	Bundang District	
IC	No name	(이름 없음)	Connection road (Yonggu-daero 2469beon-gil)	Seongnam	Bundang District	
IS	Geumgok Overpass	금곡고가차도	Dolma-ro; Prefectural Route 334 (Dongmak-ro); Prefectural Route 23 (Daewangpangyo-ro)	Seongnam	Bundang District	
IS	No name	(이름 없음)	Migeum-ro	Seongnam	Bundang District	
IS	No name	(이름 없음)	Geumgok-ro	Seongnam	Bundang District	
IS	No name	(이름 없음)	Buljeong-ro	Seongnam	Bundang District	Jeongja Underpass section
IS	No name	(이름 없음)	Jeongja-ro	Seongnam	Bundang District	Jeongja Underpass section
IS	No name	(이름 없음)	Neuti-ro	Seongnam	Bundang District	
IS	No name	(이름 없음)	Seongnam-daero 407beon-gil	Seongnam	Bundang District	Baekhyeon Underpass section
IS	Job World	잡월드사거리	Baekhyeon-ro	Seongnam	Bundang District	Baekhyeon Underpass section
IS	Sunae IS	수내사거리	Bundang-Naegok Urban Expressway; Sunae-ro	Seongnam	Bundang District	Chorim Underpass section
IS	Seohyeon Bridge IS	서현교사거리	Bundang-ro; Dongpangyo-ro 60beon-gil	Seongnam	Bundang District	Seohyeon Underpass section
IS	Maesong IS	매송사거리	Prefectural Route 57 (Seohyeon-ro)	Seongnam	Bundang District	Maesong Underpass section
IS	No name	(이름 없음)	Imae-ro	Seongnam	Bundang District	
BR	Maesong 2 Bridge	매송2교		Seongnam	Bundang District	
IS	Beolmal IS	벌말사거리	Pangyo-ro	Seongnam	Bundang District	Beolmal Underpass section
IS	No name	(이름 없음)	Yatap-ro	Seongnam	Bundang District	
IS	No name	(이름 없음)	Tancheon-ro; Jangmi-ro	Seongnam	Bundang District	
BR	Tancheon Bridge	탄천교		Seongnam	Bundang District	
BR	Tancheon Bridge	탄천교		Seongnam	Jungwon District	
BR	Daewoncheon Bridge	대원천고가교		Seongnam	Jungwon District	
IC	Tancheon IC	탄천 나들목	Sanseong-daero	Seongnam	Jungwon District	
IC	Tancheon IC	탄천 나들목	Sanseong-daero	Seongnam	Sujeong District	
BR	Dokjeongcheon Bridge	독정천교		Seongnam	Sujeong District	
TN	Taepyeong Underpass	태평지하차도		Seongnam	Sujeong District	
IC	Bokjeong	복정교차로	Heolleung-ro; National Route 3 Seoul City Route 71 (Songpa-daero)	Seongnam	Sujeong District	
Connected with Dongbu Expressway

== See also ==
- Roads and expressways in South Korea
- Transportation in South Korea
