= Xinjing =

Xinjing may refer to:

- Heart Sutra or Xinjing (心經), a Chinese-language sutra in Mahāyāna Buddhism

== Places in China ==
- Changchun, the capital city of Jilin, known as Xinjing (新京) during the Manchukuo era (1932–1945)
- Xinjing Special Municipality, the first-level administrative division of Manchukuo that covered the city of Changchun.
- Xinjing Township (新景乡), a township in Tongwei County, Gansu

=== Towns ===
- Xinjing, Guangxi (新靖), in Jingxi, Guangxi
- Xinjing, Guizhou (新景), in Yanhe Tujia Autonomous County, Guizhou
- Xinjing, Shanghai (新泾), in Changning District, Shanghai

== See also ==
- Xinjiang (disambiguation)
- Xingjing (disambiguation)
