= Xinjiang (disambiguation) =

Xinjiang (Chinese: 新疆; pinyin: Xīnjiāng), officially the Xinjiang Uyghur Autonomous Region (XUAR), is a province-level administrative autonomous region of China.

Xinjiang may also refer to:

- Xinjiang (historical area) (新疆) (Uyghur: شىنجاڭ), an area in Central Asia that includes the current region of China
- Xin River (信江), an inflow of the Poyang Lake and tributary of the Gan River, Jiangxi
- Xinjiang (新疆星), Minor planet 2336 in List of minor planets
- Xinjiang Clique (新疆), a military clique that ruled Xinjiang during China's warlord era

== Subdivisions of China ==
- Xinjiang County (新绛县), a county in Yuncheng, Shanxi
- Xinjiang Township (新江乡), a township in Suichuan County, Jiangxi

=== Towns ===
- Xinjiang, Wengyuan County (新江), in Wengyuan County, Guangdong
- Xinjiang, Guangxi (新江), in Nanning, Guangxi

=== Subdistricts ===
- Xinjiang Subdistrict, Heyuan (新江街道), in Heyuan, Guangdong
- Xinjiang Subdistrict, Harbin (新疆街道), in Harbin, Heilongjiang
- Xinjiang Subdistrict, Neijiang (新江街道), in Neijiang, Sichuan

== Related to XUAR ==
- East Turkestan, used mainly by the Uyghur diaspora to define this region
- Chinese Turkestan, a geographical region term corresponding to the Tarim Basin or Xinjiang
- Western Regions, a term used by Chinese before Xinjiang under Qing rule
- Xinjiang Province (disambiguation), several historical administrative areas of China from 1884 to 1955
- Xinjiang Production and Construction Corps, a province-level unique economic and paramilitary organization set up inside the Xinjiang Uyghur Autonomous Region in 1955, which is not affiliated to it but operates in parallel

== Xinjiang Road ==
- Xinjiang Road, in Jing'an District, Shanghai
- Xinjiang Road, in Heping District, Tianjin
- Xinjiang Road, in Gushan District, Kaohsiung, Taiwan
- Xinjiang Road, in Shibei District, Qingdao, Shandong

== See also ==
- Xinjian (disambiguation)
