= Seoul City Route 41 (Trunk) =

Road in South Korea

Seoul Special Metropolitan City Route 41
- 서울특별시도 제41호선
- Umyeon - Suseo Line

Route information
- Length: 9.18 km (5.70 mi)

Major junctions
- From: Seocho District, Seoul
- To: Gangnam District, Seoul

Location
- Country: South Korea

Highway system
- Highway systems of South Korea; Expressways; National; Local

Seoul Metropolitan City Route 41 (Korean: 서울특별시도 제41호선) is a trunk road located in Seoul, South Korea. With a total length of 9.18 km (5.70 mi), this road starts from Umyeon-dong in Seocho District, Seoul to Suseo station in Gangnam District.

== Stopovers ==
Seoul

- Seocho District

Gyeonggi Province

- Gwacheon

Seoul

- Seocho District - Gangnam District

== List of Facilities ==
IS: Intersection, IC: Interchange

Road name	Name	Hangul name	Connection	Location		Note
National Route 47 (Jungang-ro)
Jungang-ro	(Boundary)	(시계)	Gopdolmeori-gil	Seoul	Seocho District	National Route 47 overlap
Jungang-ro	No name	(이름 없음)	Yangjae-daero 2-gil	Seoul	Seocho District	National Route 47 overlap
Jungang-ro	Seonam IC	선암IC	Seoul City Route 26 (Umyeonsan-ro); Taebong-ro	Seoul	Seocho District	Seonam Underpass section Underpass Gwacheon-bound Only; National Route 47 overlap
Yangjae-daero	Seonam IC		Seoul City Route 26 (Umyeonsan-ro); Taebong-ro	Seoul	Seocho District	Seonam Underpass section Underpass Gwacheon-bound Only; National Route 47 overlap
Yangjae-daero	No name	(이름 없음)	Yangjae-daero 2-gil	Seoul	Seocho District	National Route 47 overlap
Yangjae-daero	Seonam IC	선암IC	Seoul City Route 07 (Gangnam Beltway)	Seoul	Seocho District	National Route 47 overlap
Yangjae-daero	No name	(이름 없음)	Mulsarang-ro; Chusa-ro	Gyeonggi Province	Gwacheon	National Route 47 overlap
Yangjae-daero	No name	(이름 없음)	Seoul City Route 4103 (Yangjae-daero 12-gil); Yangjae-daero 11-gil	Seoul	Seocho District	National Route 47 overlap
Yangjae-daero	Truck Terminal	트럭터미널앞	Maeheon-ro	Seoul	Seocho District	National Route 47 overlap
Yangjae-daero	Yangjae IC	양재IC	Gyeongbu Expressway; Seoul City Route 06 (Gyeongbu Urban Expressway)	Seoul	Seocho District	National Route 47 overlap
Yangjae-daero	Yeomgok IS	염곡사거리	Seoul City Route 27 (Gangnam-daero, Heolleung-ro)	Seoul	Seocho District	National Route 47 overlap
Yangjae-daero	Guryongsa IS	구룡사앞 교차로	Seoul City Route 29 (Nonhyeon-ro)	Seoul	Gangnam District	Guryong Underpass section National Route 47 overlap
Yangjae-daero	Guryong Tunnel IS	구룡터널 교차로	Seoul City Route 30 (Eonju-ro)	Seoul	Gangnam District	National Route 47 section
Yangjae-daero	Guryong Village Entrance IS	구룡마을입구 교차로	Seolleung-ro	Seoul	Gangnam District	National Route 47 section
Yangjae-daero	Gaepo 3, 4 Complex IS	개포3,4단지 교차로	Seoul City Route 4231 (Samseong-ro)	Seoul	Gangnam District	National Route 47 section
Yangjae-daero	Irwon Tunnel IS	일원터널 교차로	National Route 47 (Yeongdong-daero); Prefectural Route 23 (Yeongdong-daero); Seoul City Route 32 (Yeongdong-daero, Gwangmyeong-ro)	Seoul	Gangnam District	Irwon Underpass section National Route 47 overlap Prefectural Route 23 overlap
Yangjae-daero	Samsung Medical Center IS	삼성서울병원 교차로	Irwon-ro	Seoul	Gangnam District	Prefectural Route 23 overlap
Yangjae-daero	Irwon 1-dong Community Center	일원1동주민센터앞	Yangjae-daero 55-gil	Seoul	Gangnam District	Prefectural Route 23 overlap
Yangjae-daero	Suseo IC	수서IC	Seoul City Route 02 (Dongbu Expressway); Seoul City Route 42 (Nambu Beltway, Yangjae-daero)	Seoul	Gangnam District	Prefectural Route 23 overlap
Bamgogae-ro	Suseo IC		Seoul City Route 02 (Dongbu Expressway); Seoul City Route 42 (Nambu Beltway, Yangjae-daero)	Seoul	Gangnam District	Prefectural Route 23 overlap
Bamgogae-ro	Suseo station IS	수서역 교차로	Seoul City Route 32 (Gwangmyeong-ro, Bamgogae-ro); Seoul City Route 4101 (Gwangmyeong-ro)	Seoul	Gangnam District	Prefectural Route 23 overlap
Connected with Prefectural Route 23 (Bamgogae-ro)
