= Fengyan =

Fengyan may refer to:

- Fengyan, Guizhou (蜂岩; Fēngyán), a town in Fenggang County, Guizhou, China
- Fengyan Township (峰岩乡; 峰岩鄉; Fēngyán Xiāng), in Chongqing, China

== See also ==
- Feng Yan (disambiguation)
