= Rodeo Street =

Rodeo Street may refer to:

- Rodeo Drive
- Munjeong-dong Rodeo Street
- Apgujeong Rodeo Street
  - Apgujeongrodeo Station
