= Changji (disambiguation) =

Changji is a county-level city and seat of the Changji Hui Autonomous Prefecture, Xinjiang, China.

Changji may also refer to:

- Changji Hui Autonomous Prefecture, a prefecture of Xinjiang, China

== See also ==
- Changqi (disambiguation)
- Janggi (also spelled changgi), Korean board game
- Jangji-dong, a neighbourhood of Seoul
