= Heolleung-ro =

- 헌릉로

Route information
- Length: 10.9 km (6.8 mi)
- Existed: 15 June 1955–present

Major junctions
- From: Seocho District, Seoul
- To: Sujeong District, Seongnam

Location
- Country: South Korea

Highway system
- Highway systems of South Korea; Expressways; National; Local

Heolleung-ro (Korean: 헌릉로) is a road located in Gyeonggi Province and Seoul, South Korea. With a total length of 10.9 km (6.8 mi), this road starts from the Yeomgok intersection in Seocho District, Seoul to Sanseong station intersection in Seongnam.

== Stopovers ==
Seoul

- Seocho District - Gangnam District - Songpa District

Gyeonggi Province

- Goyang

== List of Facilities ==
IS: Intersection, IC: Interchange

Name	Hangul name	Connection	Location		Note
Connected with Gangnam-daero
Yeomgok IS (Yeomgok Underpass)	염곡사거리 (염곡지하차도)	National Route 47 (Yangjae-daero)	Seoul	Seocho District	Seoul City Route 41 section
Cheonggyesan Entrance IS	청계산입구삼거리	Cheonggyesan-ro	Seoul	Seocho District	Seoul City Route 41 section
Yeomgok IC	염곡 나들목	Yangjae-daero 12-gil	Seoul	Seocho District	Seoul City Route 41 section
Naegok IC	내곡 나들목	Seoul City Route 51 (Eonju-ro)	Seoul	Seocho District	Seoul City Route 41 section
Heonilleung Entrance IS	헌인릉입구 교차로	Heonilleung-gil	Seoul	Seocho District	
Heolleung IC	헌릉 나들목	Yongin-Seoul Expressway	Seoul	Seocho District	
(Segok Prugio)	(세곡푸르지오)	Jagok-ro	Seoul	Gangnam District	
Segok 1 Bridge	세곡1교		Seoul	Gangnam District	
Segok-dong IS	세곡동사거리	Local Route 23 (Bamgogae-ro)	Seoul	Gangnam District	
Segok IS	세곡삼거리	Wirye Tunnel; Heolleung-ro 718-gil	Seoul	Gangnam District	
Yulhyeon IS	율현삼거리	Heolleung-ro 745-gil	Seoul	Gangnam District	
Daegok Bridge	대곡교		Seoul	Gangnam District	
Daegok Bridge			Seoul	Songpa District	
Bokjeong IS	복정 교차로	Seoul City Route 61 (Dongbu Expressway); Bundang-Suseo Urban Expressway	Seoul	Songpa District	
Bokjeong station IS	복정역 교차로	National Route 3 Seoul City Route 71 (Songpa-daero) (Seongnam-daero)	Seoul	Songpa District	
Songpa IC	송파 나들목	Seoul Ring Expressway	Seoul	Songpa District	
Changgokcheon Bridge	창곡천교		Seoul	Songpa District	Local Route 342 section
Changgokcheon Bridge			Seongnam	Sujeong District	Local Route 342 section
Bokjeong IS	복정삼거리	Heolleung-ro 890beon-gil	Seongnam	Sujeong District	Local Route 342 section
No name	(이름 없음)	Wirye Tunnel; Wiryeseo-ro	Seongnam	Sujeong District	Local Route 342 section
Changgok IS	창곡 교차로	Wirye-daero; Gongwon-ro	Seongnam	Sujeong District	Local Route 342 section
Sanseong station IS	산성역사거리	Local Route 342 (Sujeong-ro); Sujeong-ro 366beon-gil	Seongnam	Sujeong District	Local Route 342 section
