= Xingjing =

Xingjing may refer to:

- Xingjing, Ningxia (兴泾), a town in Xixia District, Yinchuan, Ningxia Hui Autonomous Region, China
- Hetu Ala, the capital of Later Jin (1616–1636), also known as Xingjing (興京) after 1636, located in Xinbin Manchu Autonomous County, Liaoning, China
- Gun Metal Grey (刑警), a 2010 Hong Kong TV series
- Classic of Stars - Xingjing (星經), work on astronomy

== See also ==
- Xinjing (disambiguation)
