= Feng Yan =

Feng Yan may refer to:

- Northern Yan (?–436), dynastic state of China, known as Feng Yan after 409 when Feng Ba took over the throne
- Feng Yan (director), Chinese documentary film maker
- Yan Feng (athlete), Chinese Paralympic athlete
- Yan Feng (born 1982), Chinese footballer

== See also ==
- Fengyan (disambiguation)
