= Bamgogae-ro =

Road in Seoul, South Korea

- 밤고개로

Route information
- Length: 3.6 km (2.2 mi)

Major junctions
- From: Suseo-dong, Gangnam District, Seoul
- To: Segok-dong, Gangnam District, Seoul

Location
- Country: South Korea

Highway system
- Highway systems of South Korea; Expressways; National; Local

Bamgogae-ro (Korean: 밤고개로) is a road located in Seoul, South Korea. With a total length of 3.6 km (2.2 mi), this road starts from the Suseo Interchange Intersection in Suseo-dong to Segok 3 Bridge in Segok-dong, Gangnam District, Seoul.

== Stopovers ==
Seoul

- Gangnam District

== List of Facilities ==
IS: Intersection, IC: Interchange

Name	Hangul name	Connection	Location		Note
Connected with Nambu Beltway
Suseo IC	수서 나들목	Seoul City Route 61 (Dongbu Expressway); Seoul City Route 92; Prefectural Route 23 (Yangjae-daero) (Nambu Beltway)	Seoul	Gangnam District	
Suseo station IS	수서역 교차로	Gwangpyeong-ro	Seoul	Gangnam District	
Jagok IS	자곡사거리	Jagok-ro	Seoul	Gangnam District	
Seoul Yulhyeon Elementary IS	서울율현초교삼거리	Bamgogae-ro 23-gil	Seoul	Gangnam District	
Segok-dong IS	세곡동사거리	Seoul City Route 41 (Heolleung-ro)	Seoul	Gangnam District	
Segok 3 Bridge	세곡3교		Seoul	Gangnam District	
Connected with Daewangpangyo-ro
