= Yanhe Tujia Autonomous County =

Yanhe County 沿河县 · Yanrhef xianr Yenho
- Autonomous county
- 沿河土家族自治县; Yanrhef bifzivkar zivzixxianr Yanhe Tujia Autonomous County
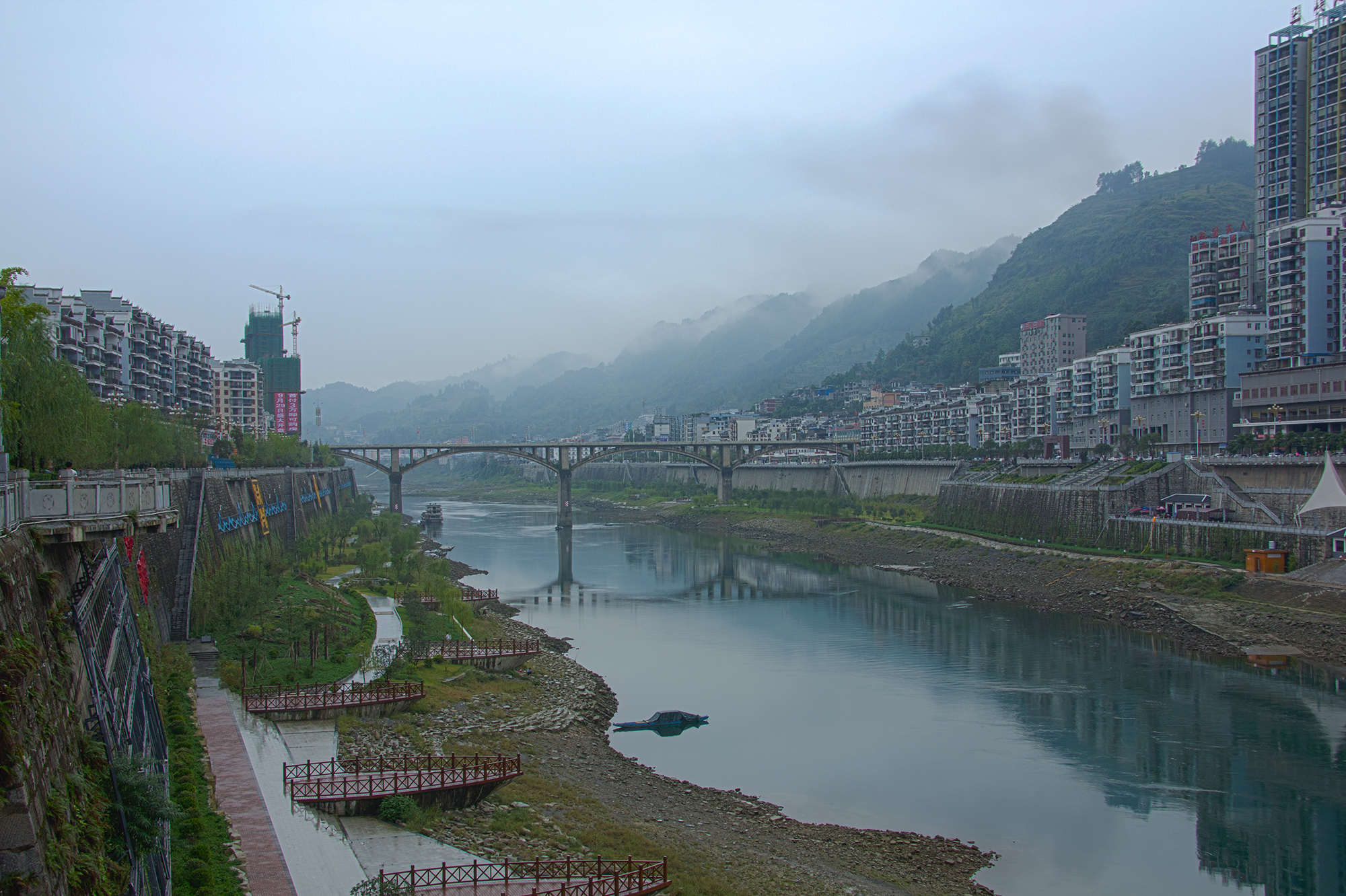
- Yanhe County seat

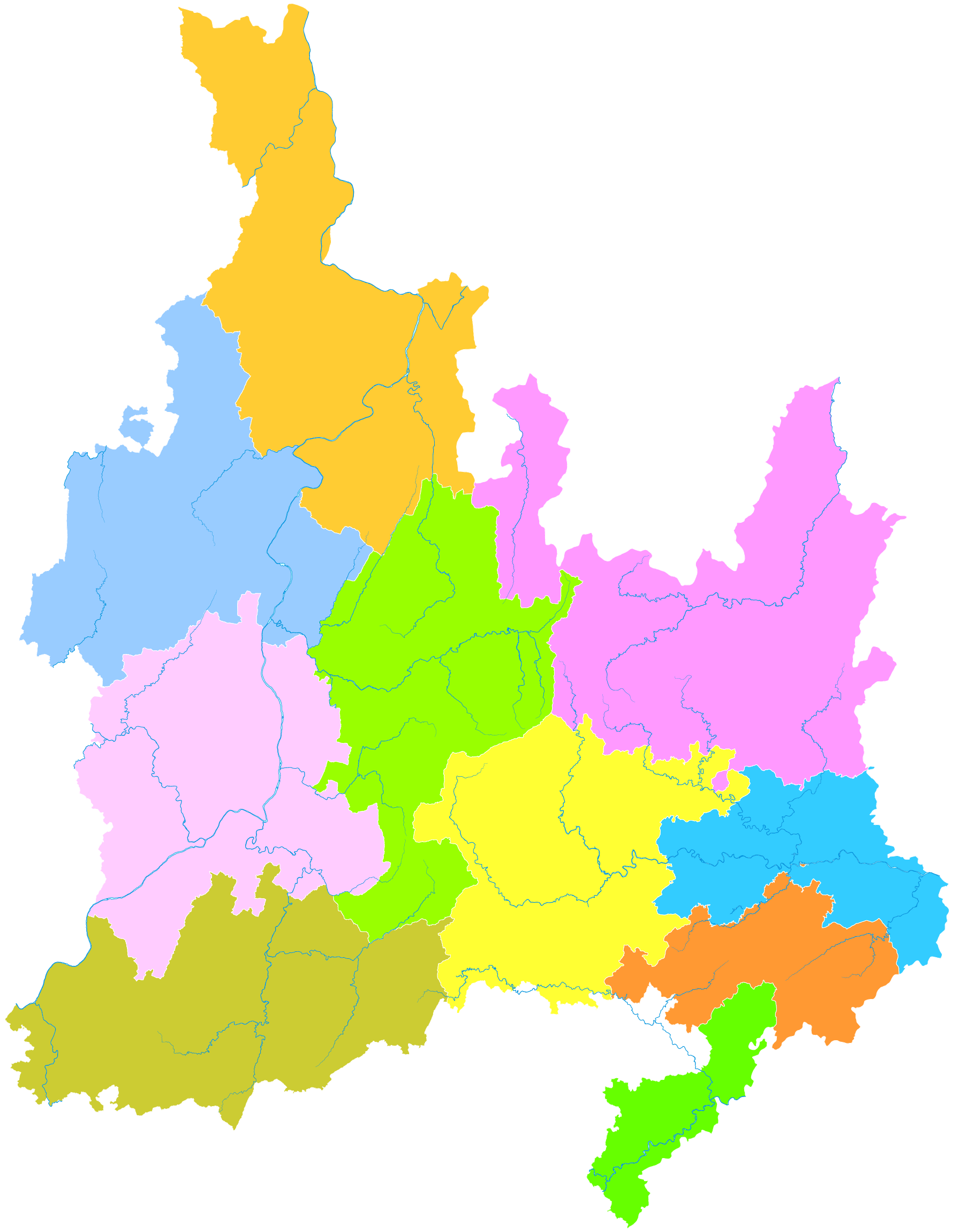
- Yanhe is the northernmost division in this map of Yanhe

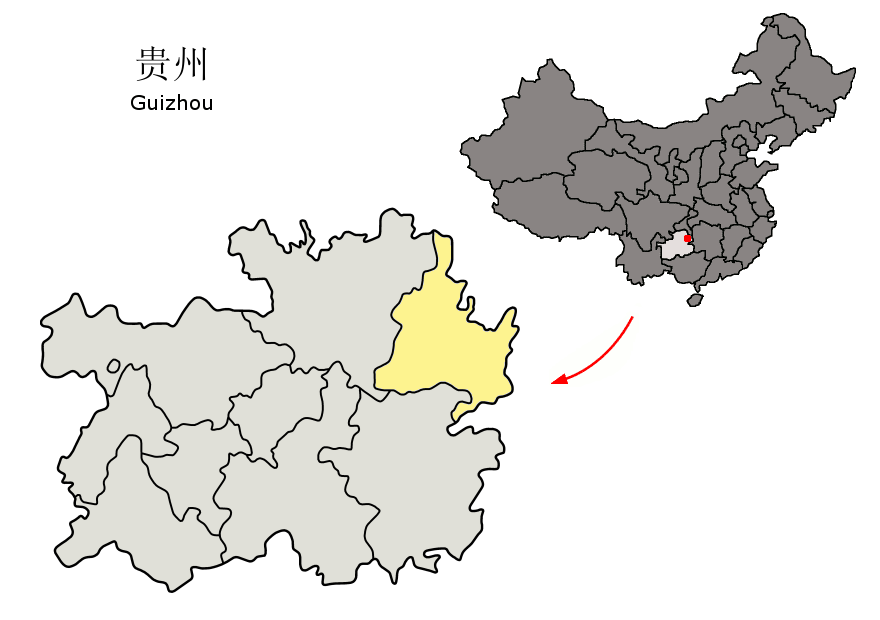
- Tongren in Guizhou

- Location of the seat in Guizhou Yanhe (Southwest China)
- Coordinates (Yanhe County government): 28°33′51″N 108°30′12″E
- Country: China
- Province: Guizhou
- Prefecture-level city: Tongren
- County seat: Tuanjie Subdistrict

Area
  - Total: 2,468.8 km^{2} (953.2 sq mi)

Population (2020 census)
  - Total: 429,893
  - Density: 174.13/km^{2} (451.00/sq mi)
- Time zone: UTC+8 (China Standard)
- Website: www.yanhe.gov.cn

Yanhe Tujia Autonomous County (simplified Chinese: 沿河土家族自治县; traditional Chinese: 沿河土家族自治縣; pinyin: Yánhé Tǔjiāzú Zìzhìxiàn; lit. 'along river'; Tujia: Yanrhef bifzivkar zivzixxianr) is a county in the northeast of Guizhou province, China, bordering Chongqing to the north. It is under the administration of the prefecture-level city of Tongren.

== Administrative divisions ==
Yanhe is divided into 4 subdistricts, 17 towns and 2 townships:

Subdistricts

- Heping Subdistrict (和平街道)
- Tuanjie Subdistrict (团结街道)
- Shazi Subdistrict (沙子街道)
- Youxi Subdistrict (祐溪街道)

Towns

- Zhongjie Town (中界镇)
- Qiaojia Town (谯家镇)
- Jiashi Town (夹石镇)
- Ganxi Town (甘溪镇)
- Qitan Town (淇滩镇)
- Heishui Town (黑水镇)
- Banchang Town (板场镇)
- Guanzhou Town (官舟镇)
- Tudi'ao Town (土地坳镇)
- Quanba Town (泉坝镇)
- Zhongzhai Town (中寨镇)
- Siqu Town (思渠镇)
- Huangtu Town (黄土镇)
- Xinjing Town (新景镇)
- Ketian Town (客田镇)
- Hongdu Town (洪渡镇)
- Tangba Town (塘坝镇)

Townships

- Xiaojing Township (晓景乡)
- Houping Township (后坪乡)

== Climate ==
Climate data for Yanhe, elevation 335 m (1,099 ft), (1991–2020 normals, extremes 1981–2010)
Month	Jan	Feb	Mar	Apr	May	Jun	Jul	Aug	Sep	Oct	Nov	Dec	Year
Record high °C (°F)	24.2 (75.6)	31.1 (88.0)	34.3 (93.7)	36.0 (96.8)	39.1 (102.4)	39.9 (103.8)	41.6 (106.9)	42.0 (107.6)	40.4 (104.7)	36.6 (97.9)	30.3 (86.5)	21.9 (71.4)	42.0 (107.6)
Mean daily maximum °C (°F)	10.0 (50.0)	12.8 (55.0)	17.4 (63.3)	23.4 (74.1)	27.3 (81.1)	30.0 (86.0)	33.6 (92.5)	33.9 (93.0)	29.7 (85.5)	23.1 (73.6)	18.0 (64.4)	12.1 (53.8)	22.6 (72.7)
Daily mean °C (°F)	6.8 (44.2)	8.9 (48.0)	12.8 (55.0)	18.1 (64.6)	22.0 (71.6)	25.0 (77.0)	27.9 (82.2)	27.8 (82.0)	24.2 (75.6)	18.6 (65.5)	13.7 (56.7)	8.7 (47.7)	17.9 (64.2)
Mean daily minimum °C (°F)	4.6 (40.3)	6.4 (43.5)	9.8 (49.6)	14.6 (58.3)	18.5 (65.3)	21.7 (71.1)	24.0 (75.2)	23.7 (74.7)	20.7 (69.3)	15.9 (60.6)	11.2 (52.2)	6.4 (43.5)	14.8 (58.6)
Record low °C (°F)	−3.2 (26.2)	−2.3 (27.9)	0.1 (32.2)	5.8 (42.4)	10.1 (50.2)	14.6 (58.3)	18.3 (64.9)	17.6 (63.7)	13.2 (55.8)	7.1 (44.8)	0.7 (33.3)	−2.4 (27.7)	−3.2 (26.2)
Average precipitation mm (inches)	26 (1.0)	24.9 (0.98)	51.0 (2.01)	109.0 (4.29)	177.7 (7.00)	210.2 (8.28)	185.2 (7.29)	129.8 (5.11)	81.5 (3.21)	96.7 (3.81)	50.4 (1.98)	18.7 (0.74)	1,161.1 (45.7)
Average precipitation days (≥ 0.1 mm)	10.3	9.8	13.3	15.1	16.6	16.4	13.5	11.7	9.6	14.3	10.3	9.0	149.9
Average snowy days	3.0	1.2	0.4	0	0	0	0	0	0	0	0	0.9	5.5
Average relative humidity (%)	75	74	74	77	79	82	78	75	75	80	79	75	77
Mean monthly sunshine hours	35.8	41.5	68.4	89.3	108.3	102.2	173.3	183.6	122.7	78.8	63.0	43.3	1,110.2
Percentage possible sunshine	11	13	18	23	26	24	41	46	34	22	20	14	24
Source: China Meteorological Administration
