= Seoul International School =

Private day school in Seongnam, South Korea

Coordinates: 37.4658°N 127.1291°E

서울국제학교 Seoul International School
- Seongnam; South Korea

Information
- Type: Private, Day; International school
- Motto: "Seoul International School develops inquisitive, independent thinkers and collaborative learners, who acquire the essential knowledge necessary to be caring and creative contributors to the world around them."
- Established: June 5, 1973
- Grades: K-12
- Campus size: 8 acres
- Campus type: Suburban
- Colors: Orange and Black
- Mascot: Tiger
- Newspaper: Tiger Times & Tiger Times Online
- Yearbook: Tiger's Eye
- Website: www.siskorea.org www.ttonl.org

Seoul International School (SIS) is a secular international private college preparatory school situated in Seongnam, South Korea, offering an American curriculum in an English-only setting.

== History ==
When Seoul International School first opened in 1973, it was the first foreign school since Korea's liberation from the Japanese annex to be fully recognized by the South Korean Ministry of Education. The school was first located on the campus of Konkuk University where a new classroom facility was completed in 1976.

The school graduated its first four-year high school senior class in 1978. As SIS expanded, the school required more facilities and a larger campus. In 1981, the present 8-acre (32,000 m^{2}) site was selected, and the school buildings were designed with Korean architectural motifs. The 150,000 square feet (14,000 m^{2}) campus was completed just over four years later. The move to the current campus was made in May 1985. Located in the city of Seongnam (on the border of southeast Seoul), the school is about 25 minutes south of Lotte World, the Jamsil subway station and Olympic Park. The school is located near the Bokjeong station on Seoul Subway Line 8.

The Western Association of Schools and Colleges (WASC), based in California, accredited Seoul International School for a six-year term in 1979. Subsequent reaccreditations were received in 1985, 1991, 1997, 2003 and the spring of 2009. As a condition of attending the school, every student is required to hold non-Korean permanent residency or citizenship.

In 2018, the headmaster of the school, Kim Hyung-shik, was investigated for embezzling 20 billion won ($17.8 million) while illegally managing the school.

== Campus and facilities ==
The school has a WiFi network integrated into all classrooms, campus areas and facilities. There are two libraries and several science laboratories. All students in grades 4–12 are part of a one-to-one learning network, accompanied by an Apple company technician who is full-time on campus and a professional technology learning staff who takes care of student and teacher needs in a 100% Macintosh computer program. Athletic facilities include three gymnasiums, a five-lane indoor 25-meter heated swimming pool, a soccer field with artificial turf, and weights and gymnastics rooms. Playgrounds, soccer fields, and libraries are available for student use during classes, for recess, and after school. One of the gymnasiums was demolished for the construction of a new elementary building, which was completed as of 2013. It contains seven floors with elementary school classrooms, a full-sized gymnasium in the basement level, six stories of classrooms, learning spaces, two multi-purpose rooms, specialist Art, teacher preparation, ESL/SN rooms and a sixth-floor gymnasium for elementary students. It also has two basement floors, with the B2 consisting of the gymnasium and swimming pool.

The 350-seat school auditorium is used for school assemblies, teacher and parent functions, fine arts productions and concerts and is equipped with lighting and sound systems. The auditorium was completely renovated in 2016. Music students have access to facilities including band, strings and choir rooms and soundproofed practice, instrument, choral and strings rooms.

In elementary and middle school, there are about 20 (ES) to 20 (MS) students per homeroom. There are four to five homerooms in each grade. In high school, there are about 12 to 20 students per class. In the school year of 2017–2018, the average class size is 15.0 for all classes and 15.2 for Advanced Placement classes. Every year, 100% of the graduating class matriculate into colleges and universities, with the majority going to the United States upon graduation along with a few students moving on to Korean universities. Less than 5% of students graduate to different countries, mostly to the UK, Korea, Japan, or China.

=== Academics ===
Seoul International School (SIS) offers 23 Advanced Placement (AP) courses. Depending on the academic year, student grade point averages (GPA) range between 96 and 97 on a 100-point scale. Student performance data reflects high average scores on AP exams, the SAT, and the ACT.

SIS also offers non-academic courses, including classes in art, drama, and music. There are many non-AP classes including arts, music and design classes, government, statistics, anatomy, mathematical functions and models, history, communications, and life sports. The school also offers the AP Capstone program classes in Seminar and Research as of the 2016–2017 school year.

=== Higher Education Outcomes ===
Graduates from the institution matriculate into highly selective universities internationally. Acceptances include institutions such as Harvard University, Yale University, Stanford University, the University of Pennsylvania, Columbia University, Brown University, and Cornell University.

=== Languages courses ===
For foreign language courses, students are given two options: Chinese and Spanish. There are five levels for language courses, from 1 to 4 and an AP course. For English, students are required to take two English courses until their senior year. Freshmen take English 9 and Communications, sophomores take English 10 or Advanced Grammar and Composition 10, juniors take English 11 or Advanced Grammar and Composition 11 and are given an option of AP Language, seniors are given an option of English 12, AP Language or AP Literature. Many students are involved in teaching Korean for foreigners after school.

== Sports ==
Seoul International School is a Division 1, but primarily Division 2 member of the Korean-American Interscholastic Activities Conference. SIS fields teams in tennis, cross country, and swimming for Division 1 and volleyball, basketball, cheerleading, and soccer for Division 2.

== Student life and activities ==
=== Middle school ===
==== Sports ====
In middle school, there are eight sports that students can choose to be part of. Some occur in the same season.

- Soccer
- Cross Country
- Swimming
- Volleyball
- Table Tennis
- Basketball
- Badminton
- AQT (Academic Quiz Team)

==== Advisory and electives ====
Advisory is a period that allows students to meet with their homeroom teacher and interact through activities and games. It was established with the aim that students will bond with their teachers and engage in a non-academic environment.

Middle school students have multiple electives that they can choose from. The list includes MS Global Issues Network (GIN), Drama, Music (Band, Choir, or Strings), Art, Yoga, and more.

==== Student council (MSSC) ====
Officers that make up the student council are elected through a democratic process. Speeches are made in front of the entire middle school student body and each individual votes for the candidates of their choosing. MSSC is in charge of organizing multiple events, including an annual carnival that is hosted towards the end of the school year.

=== High school ===
The high school has a faculty of over 50 teachers. The high school offers over 23 AP classes in 55 different sections, including the AP Capstone Diploma, which the school has adopted for the 2016–2017 school year and onward. The current administration and faculty is led by Gray Macklin.

==== Clubs ====
There are numerous student organizations in high school. The existing clubs include Business Club, Habitat for Humanity (HFH), Global Issues Network (GIN), Mu Alpha Theta (MAT), Korean Service for Foreigners (KSF), Amnesty International, National Honor Society (NHS), Korean Animal Service Association (KASA), North Korea Human Rights (NKHR), Tri-M Music Honor Society, Kaleidoscope, Seoulite, Model United Nations (MUN), Community Service Club, Science Club, and more.

Students are asked in the beginning of the year to fill out an application to apply for clubs, but can also choose to switch, remove, or add clubs at the beginning of the second semester as well. Many commit to clubs in freshmen year and work to earn leadership positions in future years.

== Notable alumni ==
- Daniel Armand Lee
