= Xinjing Township =

Xinjing Township 新景乡
- township
- Location in Gansu
- Coordinates: 35°12′1″N 105°34′10″E
- Country: People's Republic of China
- Province: Gansu
- Prefecture-level city: Dingxi
- County: Tongwei County
- Time zone: UTC+8 (China Standard)

Xinjing Township (Chinese: 新景乡; pinyin: Xīnjǐng Xiāng) is a township in Tongwei County, Gansu province, China. As of 2018, it has 13 villages under its administration.

== See also ==
- List of township-level divisions of Gansu
