= Xinjian Subdistrict, Nanchong =

Xinjian Subdistrict 新建街道
- Subdistrict
- Location in Sichuan
- Coordinates: 30°47′49″N 106°4′9″E
- Country: People's Republic of China
- Province: Sichuan
- Prefecture-level city: Nanchong
- District: Shunqing District
- Time zone: UTC+8 (China Standard)

Xinjian Subdistrict (Chinese: 新建街道; pinyin: Xīnjiàn Jiēdào) is a subdistrict in Shunqing District, Nanchong, Sichuan province, China. As of 2018, it has five residential communities under its administration.

== See also ==
- List of township-level divisions of Sichuan
