= Xinjiang Subdistrict, Neijiang =

Xinjiang Subdistrict 新江街道
- Subdistrict
- Location in Sichuan
- Coordinates: 29°34′49″N 105°4′41″E
- Country: People's Republic of China
- Province: Sichuan
- Prefecture-level city: Neijiang
- District: Dongxing District
- Time zone: UTC+8 (China Standard)

Xinjiang Subdistrict (Chinese: 新江街道; pinyin: Xīnjiāng Jiēdào) is a subdistrict in Dongxing District, Neijiang, Sichuan province, China. As of 2018, it has 10 residential communities under its administration.

== See also ==
- List of township-level divisions of Sichuan
