= Xianjing, Zhuzhou =

Xianjing Township
- Township

Chinese transcription(s)
  - Simplified: 仙井乡
  - Traditional: 仙井鄉
  - Pinyin: Xianjing Xiang
- Location in China
- Coordinates: 27°42′29″N 113°13′08″E
- Country: People's Republic of China
- Province: Hunan
- City: Zhuzhou
- County: Zhuzhou County

Area
  - Total: 74.2 km^{2} (28.6 sq mi)

Population
  - Total: 31,190
  - Density: 420/km^{2} (1,090/sq mi)
- Time zone: UTC+8 (China Standard)
- Area code: 0733

Xianjing Township (simplified Chinese: 仙井乡; traditional Chinese: 仙井鄉; pinyin: Xianjing Xiang), is a rural township in Zhuzhou County, Zhuzhou City, Hunan Province, People's Republic of China.

== Cityscape ==
The township is divided into 24 villages, the following areas: Leijiaqiao Village, Xiaoling Village, Gaoquan Village, Wangzhu Village, Huangxia Village, Yitang Village, Gaoba Village, Piaoshajing Village, Meixian Village, Youzhen Village, Qiangongtang Village, Luxiaqiao Village, Guanwangmiao Village, Zhanggongling Village, Dengtou Village, Xiaoliang Village, Chenjiashan Village, Wutianshan Village, Longfengchong Village, Zengjiachong Village, Shizitang Village, Quantang Village, Banzhuyuan Village, and Tanmuqiao Village (雷家桥村、晓岭村、高泉村、王竹村、黄霞村、倚塘村、高坝村、漂沙井村、梅仙村、油圳村、千弓塘村、芦下桥村、关王庙村、张公岭村、凳头村、小良村、陈家山村、吴田山村、龙凤冲村、曾家冲村、石子塘村、泉塘村、斑竹园村、檀木桥村).
