= Garak Market =

Fish market in Seoul, South Korea

Coordinates: 37.494°N 127.113°E

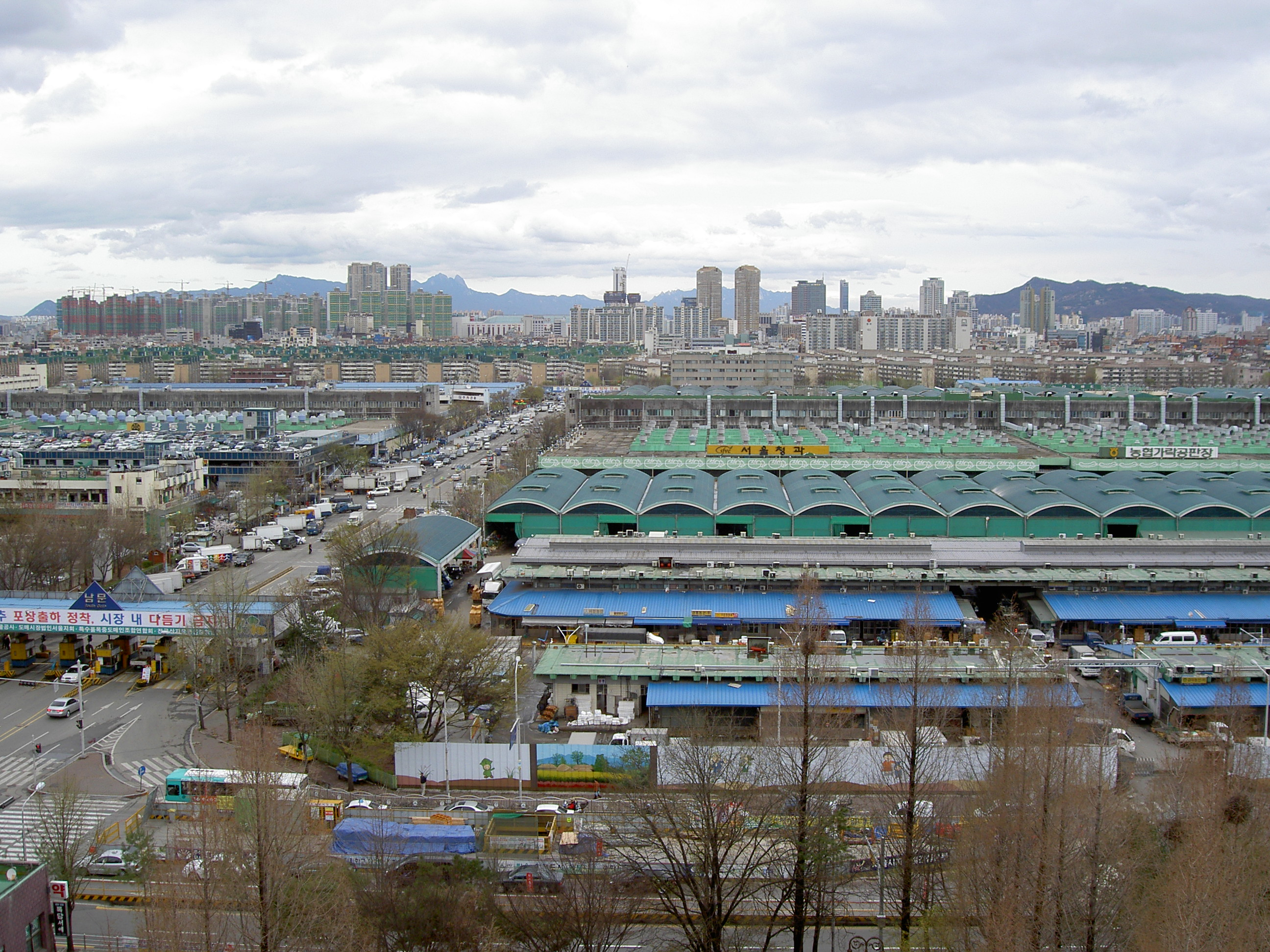
- Birdseye view of the market
- Interactive map of the Garak Market area

General information
- Location: Garak-dong, Songpa District, Seoul, South Korea

Korean name
- Hangul: 가락시장
- Hanja: 可樂市場
- RR: Garak sijang
- MR: Karak sijang

Garak Fish Market (Korean: 가락시장) or Garak-dong Agricultural Market is an extensive farmers fish market in the neighborhood of Garak-dong in Songpa District, Seoul, South Korea. It is served by the Garak Market station of the Seoul Metropolitan Subway.

It opened in June 1985.

== Gallery ==
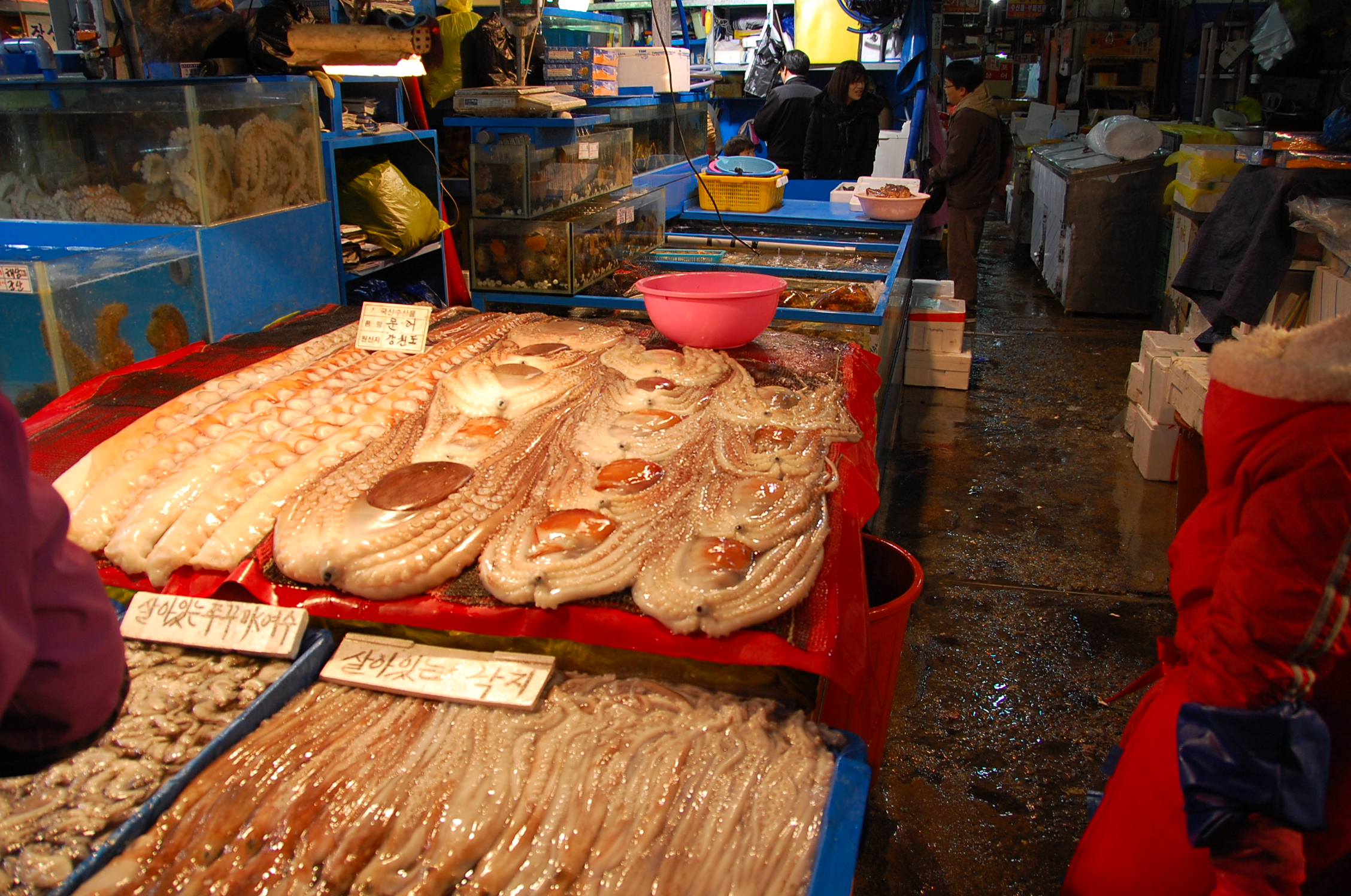
Fish on display

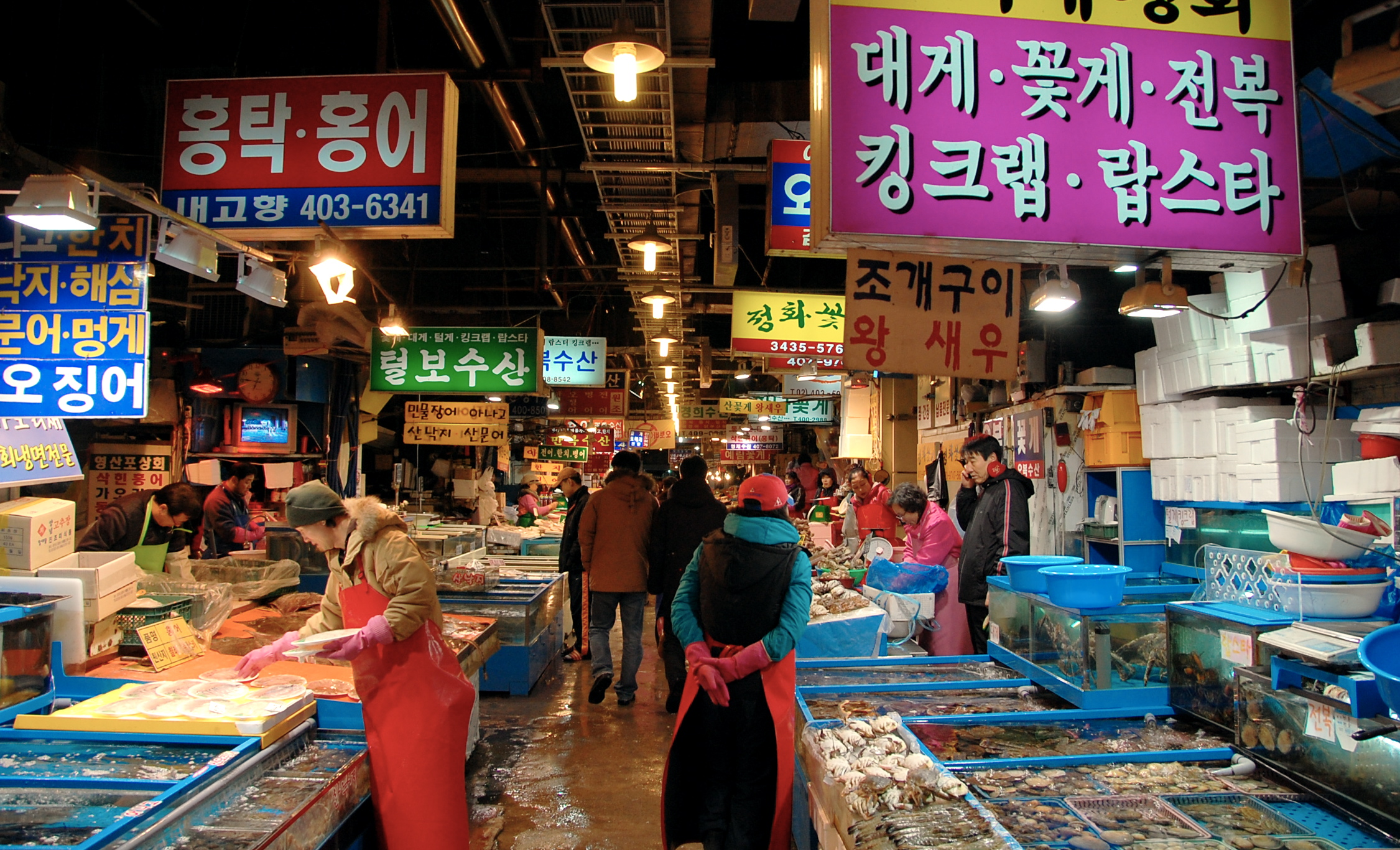
Garak Fish Market

== See also ==
- List of markets in South Korea
- List of South Korean tourist attractions
