= Xinjing, Guizhou =

Xinjing 新景镇
- Town
- Location within Guizhou Location within China
- Coordinates: 28°53′16″N 108°18′1″E
- Country: People's Republic of China
- Province: Guizhou
- Prefecture-level city: Tongren
- County: Yanhe Tujia Autonomous County
- Time zone: UTC+8 (China Standard)

Xinjing (Chinese: 新景; pinyin: Xīnjǐng) is a town in Yanhe Tujia Autonomous County, Guizhou province, China. As of 2018, it has two residential communities and 11 villages under its administration.

== See also ==
- List of township-level divisions of Guizhou
