= Fenggang County =

Fenggang County 凤冈县 Fengkang
- County
- Location of the seat in Guizhou Fenggang (Southwest China)
- Coordinates (Fenggang County government): 27°57′16″N 107°42′59″E
- Country: China
- Province: Guizhou
- Prefecture-level city: Zunyi
- County seat: Longquan

Area
  - Total: 1,883 km^{2} (727 sq mi)

Population (2010)
  - Total: 313,005
  - Density: 166.2/km^{2} (430.5/sq mi)
- Time zone: UTC+8 (China Standard)
- Postal code: 564200
- Area code: 0852
- Website: www.gzfenggang.gov.cn

Fenggang County (simplified Chinese: 凤冈县; traditional Chinese: 鳳岡縣; pinyin: Fènggāng Xiàn; lit. 'phoenix mound') is a county in the north of Guizhou province, China. It is under the administration of Zunyi city.

== History ==
Fenggang was founded in 1601. It is located at the southern foot of Dalou Mountain and the northern bank of Wujiang River. The landscape in the county includes the fossilized terrestrial plant Qian Yuzhi, the "Ancient Military Cave Fortress" on Agate Mountain, the "Yelang Gudian" cliff carvings of the Ming Dynasty, and the "Wangu Huiyou" on Zhonghuashan Mountain.

Fenggang County is the first batch of national experimental demonstration zones for sustainable agricultural development. On September 25, 2018, Guizhou Province agreed to Fenggang County and other 14 counties (districts) to withdraw from the impoverished counties. In March 2019, it was ranked on the list of the first batch of counties of revolutionary cultural relics protection and utilization of piecemeal districts.

On October 9, 2020, it was awarded the title of the fourth batch of national ecological civilization construction demonstration cities and counties by the Ministry of Ecology and Environment.

== Administrative Divisions ==
Fenggang County consists of 2 subdistricts and 11 towns:

subdistricts

- Longquan Subdistrict (龙泉街道)
- Heba Subdistrict (何坝街道)

towns

- Jinhua Town (进化镇)
- Yachuan Town (琊川镇)
- Fengyan Town (蜂岩镇)
- Yonghe Town (永和镇)
- Huaping Town (花坪镇)
- Suiyang Town (绥阳镇)
- Tuxi Town (土溪镇)
- Yong'an Town (永安镇)
- Tianqiao Town (天桥镇)
- Wangzhai Town (王寨镇)
- Xinjian Town (新建镇)

== Climate ==
Climate data for Fenggang, elevation 710 m (2,330 ft), (1991–2020 normals, extremes 1981–present)
Month	Jan	Feb	Mar	Apr	May	Jun	Jul	Aug	Sep	Oct	Nov	Dec	Year
Record high °C (°F)	23.4 (74.1)	30.2 (86.4)	34.5 (94.1)	34.2 (93.6)	36.8 (98.2)	34.2 (93.6)	36.8 (98.2)	37.1 (98.8)	37.2 (99.0)	32.1 (89.8)	27.9 (82.2)	21.9 (71.4)	37.2 (99.0)
Mean daily maximum °C (°F)	7.5 (45.5)	10.3 (50.5)	15.1 (59.2)	20.9 (69.6)	24.7 (76.5)	27.3 (81.1)	30.3 (86.5)	30.6 (87.1)	26.5 (79.7)	20.3 (68.5)	15.5 (59.9)	9.7 (49.5)	19.9 (67.8)
Daily mean °C (°F)	4.4 (39.9)	6.6 (43.9)	10.6 (51.1)	15.9 (60.6)	19.8 (67.6)	22.9 (73.2)	25.3 (77.5)	24.9 (76.8)	21.3 (70.3)	16.1 (61.0)	11.4 (52.5)	6.3 (43.3)	15.5 (59.8)
Mean daily minimum °C (°F)	2.4 (36.3)	4.2 (39.6)	7.6 (45.7)	12.4 (54.3)	16.3 (61.3)	19.7 (67.5)	21.6 (70.9)	21.1 (70.0)	18.0 (64.4)	13.6 (56.5)	8.8 (47.8)	4.0 (39.2)	12.5 (54.5)
Record low °C (°F)	−4.9 (23.2)	−4.4 (24.1)	−2.7 (27.1)	3.2 (37.8)	8.0 (46.4)	13.1 (55.6)	14.2 (57.6)	15.2 (59.4)	9.9 (49.8)	4.0 (39.2)	−1.9 (28.6)	−3.9 (25.0)	−4.9 (23.2)
Average precipitation mm (inches)	30.7 (1.21)	29.7 (1.17)	53.9 (2.12)	100.9 (3.97)	173.4 (6.83)	241.4 (9.50)	184.1 (7.25)	135.9 (5.35)	100.1 (3.94)	110.0 (4.33)	51.2 (2.02)	23.6 (0.93)	1,234.9 (48.62)
Average precipitation days (≥ 0.1 mm)	13.9	13.4	16.3	16.3	18.2	17.2	14.1	12.6	11.7	16.4	12.7	12.3	175.1
Average snowy days	4.0	2.1	0.5	0	0	0	0	0	0	0	0.1	1.6	8.3
Average relative humidity (%)	81	81	81	81	82	84	82	81	82	85	84	81	82
Mean monthly sunshine hours	26.3	34.9	55.7	81.9	96.3	91.4	157.6	175.8	115.9	68.8	57.4	38.3	1,000.3
Percentage possible sunshine	8	11	15	21	23	22	37	44	32	20	18	12	22
Source: China Meteorological Administration
