= Xinjian, Guizhou =

Xinjian 新建镇
- Town
- Location within Guizhou Location within China
- Coordinates: 28°11′26″N 107°40′19″E
- Country: People's Republic of China
- Province: Guizhou
- Prefecture-level city: Zunyi
- County: Fenggang County
- Time zone: UTC+8 (China Standard)

Xinjian (Chinese: 新建; pinyin: Xīnjiàn) is a town in Fenggang County, Guizhou province, China. As of 2018, it has one residential community and 3 villages under its administration.

== See also ==
- List of township-level divisions of Guizhou
