= Xinjiang Province =

Xinjiang Province may refer to one of three historical provinces in China:

- Xinjiang Province, Great Qing (1884–1912)
- Xinjiang Province, Republic of China (1912–1949, de facto; 1912–1992, de jure)
- Xinjiang Province, People's Republic of China (1949–1955), replaced by the Xinjiang Uyghur Autonomous Region
