= Xinjiang Subdistrict, Heyuan =

Xinjiang Subdistrict 新江街道
- Subdistrict
- Location in Guangdong
- Coordinates: 23.7365°N 114.6913°E
- Country: People's Republic of China
- Province: Guangdong
- Prefecture-level city: Heyuan
- District: Yuancheng District
- Time zone: UTC+8 (China Standard)

Xinjiang Subdistrict (Chinese: 新江街道; pinyin: Xīnjiāng Jiēdào) is a subdistrict in Yuancheng District, Heyuan, Guangdong province, China. As of 2018, it has 6 residential communities under its administration.

== See also ==
- List of township-level divisions of Guangdong
