= Xinjian Township, Yingjing County =

Xinjian Township 新建乡
- Township
- Location in Sichuan
- Coordinates: 29°50′33″N 102°40′36″E
- Country: People's Republic of China
- Province: Sichuan
- Prefecture-level city: Ya'an
- County: Yingjing County
- Time zone: UTC+8 (China Standard)

Xinjian Township (simplified Chinese: 新建乡; traditional Chinese: 新建鄉; pinyin: Xīnjiàn Xiāng) is a township under the administration of Yingjing County, in central Sichuan, China. As of 2018, it has four villages under its administration.
