= Fengyan, Guizhou =

Fengyan 蜂岩镇
- Town
- Location within Guizhou Location within China
- Coordinates: 27°45′34″N 107°48′33″E
- Country: People's Republic of China
- Province: Guizhou
- Prefecture-level city: Zunyi
- County: Fenggang County
- Time zone: UTC+8 (China Standard)

Fengyan (Chinese: 蜂岩; pinyin: Fēngyán) is a town of Fenggang County, Guizhou, China. As of 2020, it administers the following communities and villages:

- Yipinquan Residential Community (一品泉社区)
- Longjin Residential Community (龙井社区)
- Xunjian Village (巡检村)
- Zhaoping Village (赵坪村)
- Taoping Village (桃坪村)
- Xiaohe Village (小河村)
- Zhongshu Village (中枢村)
- Zhuchang Village (朱场村)

== See also ==
- List of township-level divisions of Guizhou
