= Jangji-dong =

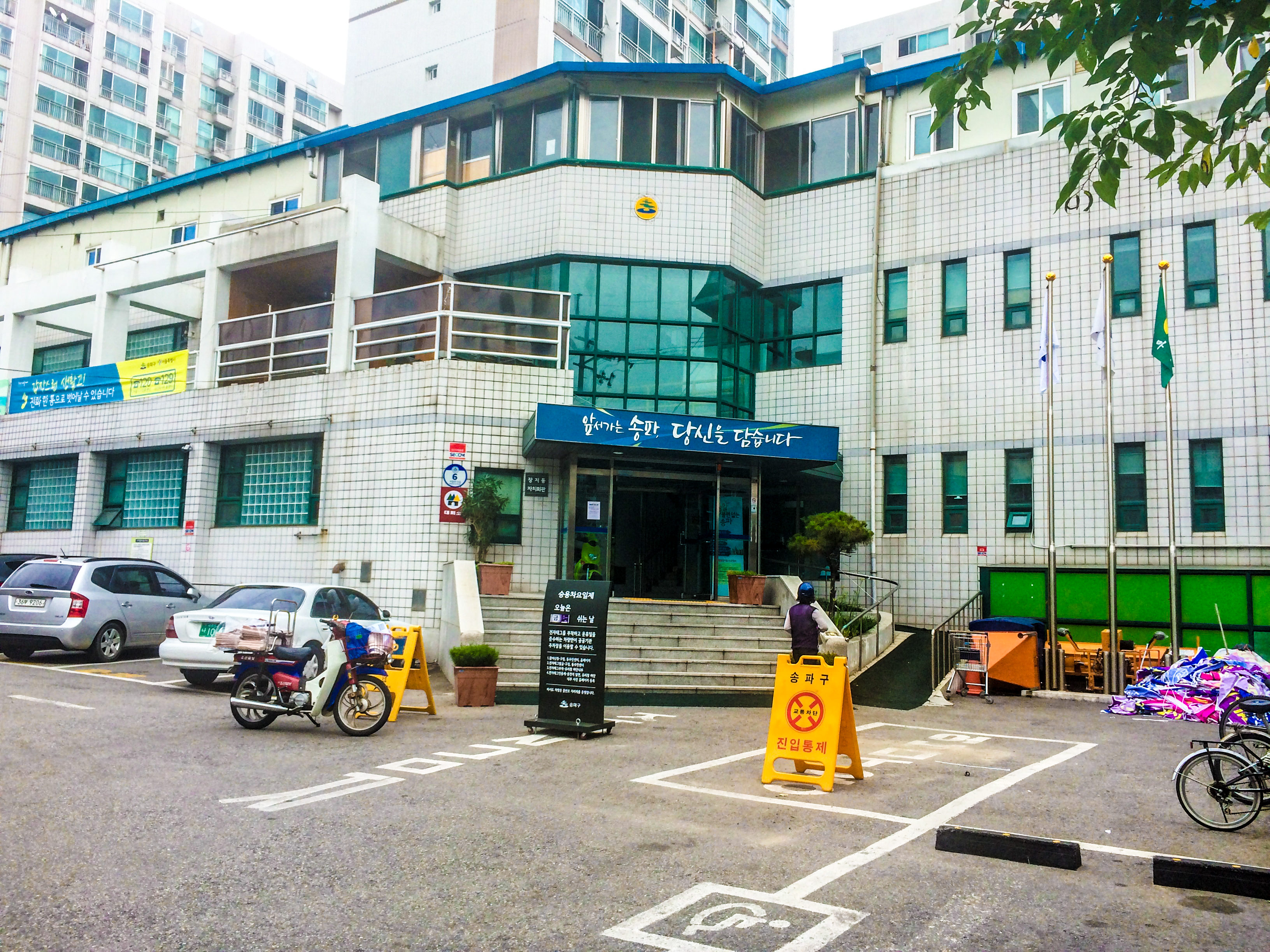
- Jangji-dong Community Service Center

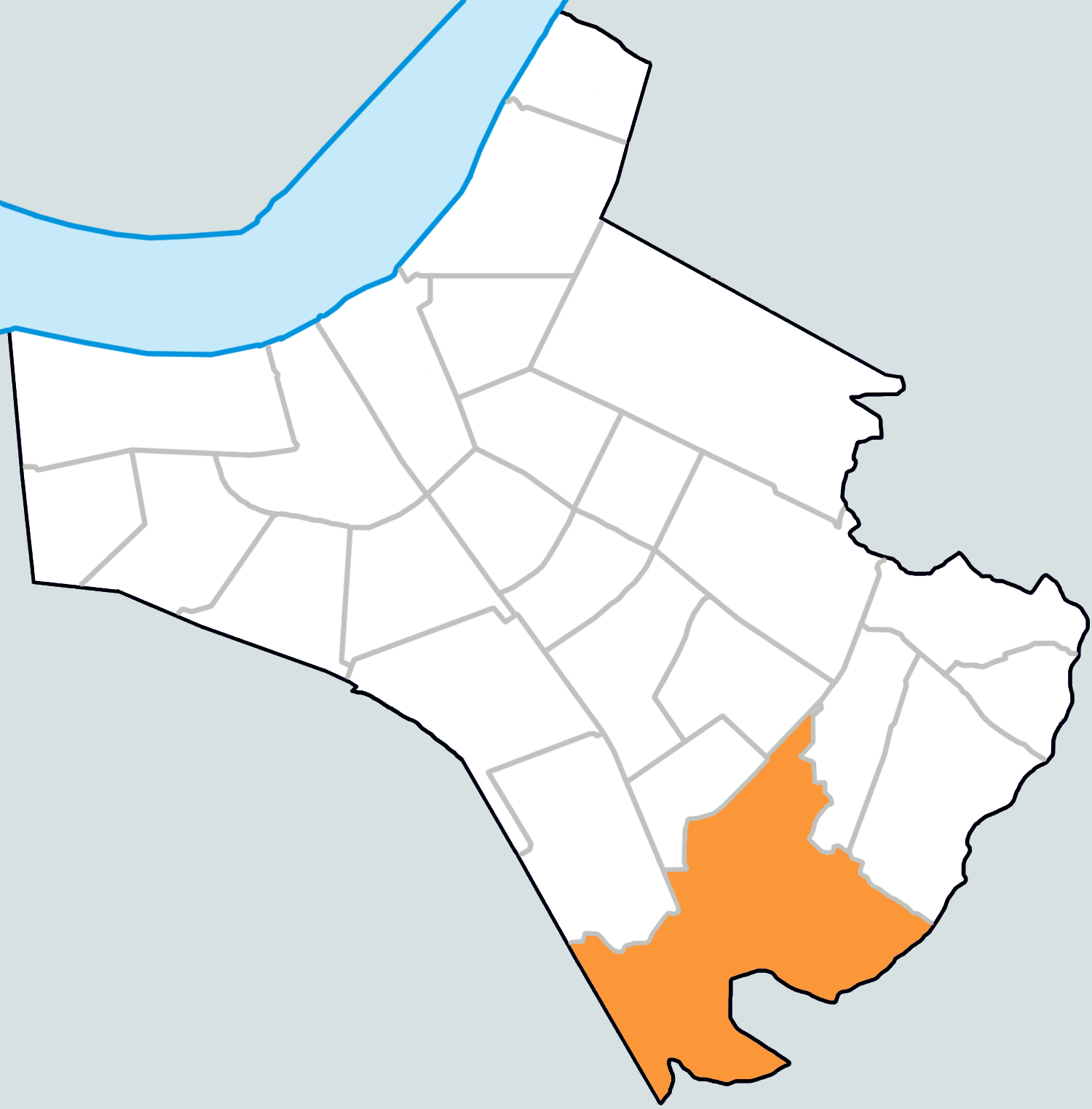
- Country: South Korea

Area
  - Total: 2.60 km^{2} (1.00 sq mi)

Population (2013)
  - Total: 37,501
  - Density: 14,400/km^{2} (37,400/sq mi)

Korean name
- Hangul: 장지동
- Hanja: 長旨洞
- RR: Jangji-dong
- MR: Changji-dong

Jangji-dong (Korean: 장지동) is a dong (neighborhood) of Songpa District, Seoul, South Korea. The old name of the dong was janbeodeuri (잔버드리), derived from jan beodeul (잔버들, willow) where the species grew a lot.

== Overview ==
Jangjidong was originally part of Jangji-ri, Jungdae-myeon, Gwangju-gun. On January 1, 1963, following the expansion of Seoul's administrative boundaries, it was incorporated into Seongdong-gu and renamed Jangjidong. On October 1, 1975, it became part of the newly established Gangnam-gu, and on October 1, 1979, it was transferred to Gangdong-gu. Finally, on January 1, 1988, Jangjidong became part of the newly created Songpa-gu.

On October 1, 1992, a civil service center for Munjeong 1-dong was established in the area. Later, on August 1, 1996, Jangjidong was separated from Munjeong 1-dong and became its own administrative district.

The origin of the neighborhood's name is debated. One theory suggests it was named for the long shape of the village, while another theory attributes it to the abundance of willow trees ("jan beodeul") in the area.

== Education ==
Schools located in Jangji-dong:

- Seoul Munhyeon Elementary School
- Seoul Songrye Elementary School
- Munhyeon Middle School
- Songrye Middle School
- Munhyeon High School
- Hanlim Multi Art School

== Transportation ==
- Jangji station of
- Bokjeong station of and of Suin–Bundang Line

== See also ==
- Administrative divisions of South Korea
