= Jangji station =

Train station in South Korea

Coordinates: 37.478158°N 127.126297°E

장지; Jangji
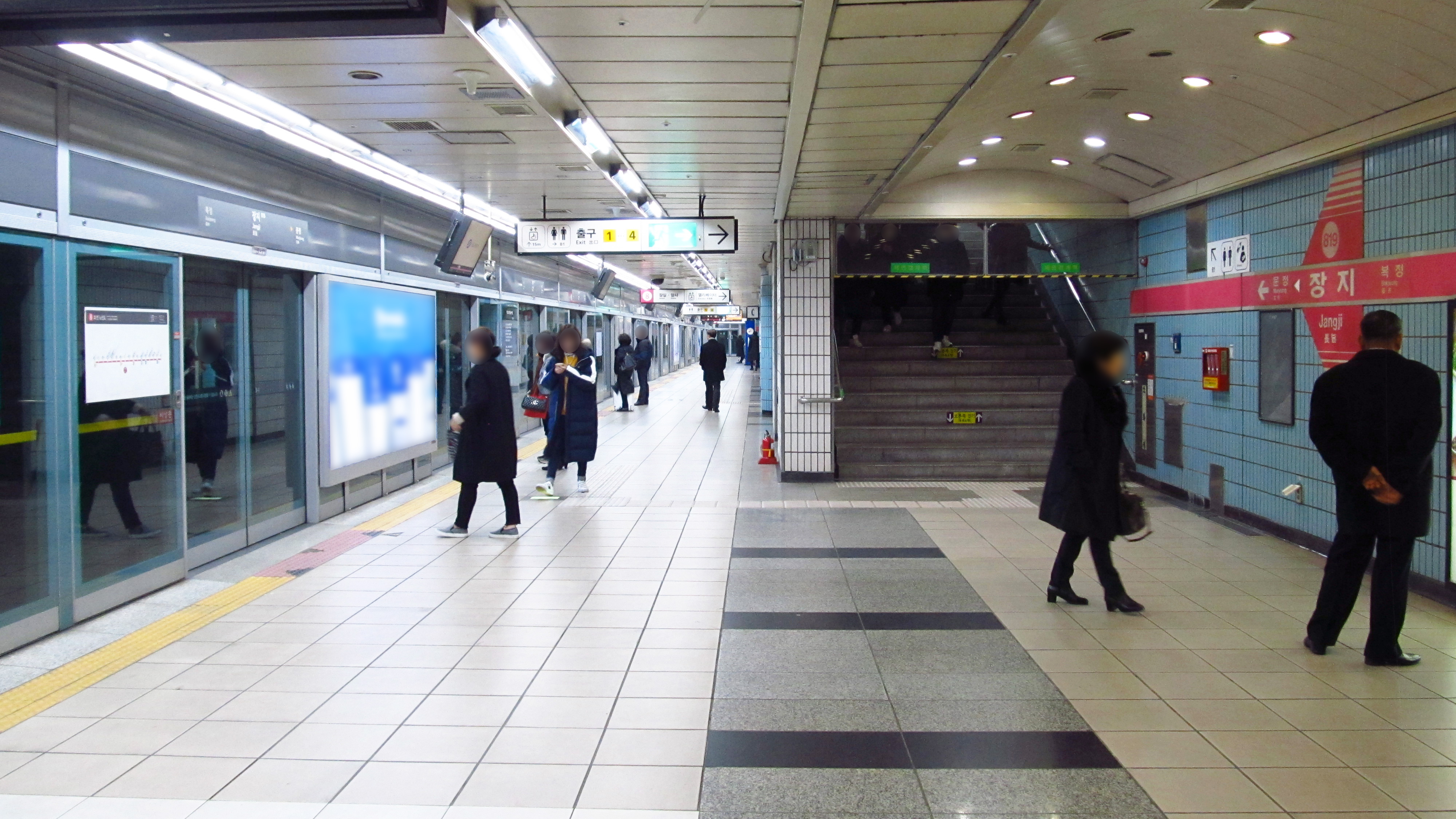
- Station platform

Korean name
- Hangul: 장지역
- Hanja: 長旨驛
- Revised Romanization: Jangji-yeok
- McCune–Reischauer: Changji-yŏk

General information
- Location: 217 Jangji-dong, Songpa-gu, Seoul
- Operator: Seoul Metro
- Line: Line 8
- Platforms: 2
- Tracks: 2

Construction
- Structure type: Underground

Key dates
- November 23, 1996: Line 8 opened
Location

Jangji station is a subway station in Jangji-dong, Songpa District, which is located in Seoul, South Korea. This station is on Seoul Subway Line 8.

Jangji is mostly a bed town, with numerous apartments, including the "Songpa Pine Town". The Garden 5, a shopping mall with a movie theater, spa, etc., is next to exit 5.

== Station layout ==
Munjeong ↑
S/B | | N/B
↓ Bokjeong

Northbound	← ● Line 8 toward Byeollae
Southbound	● Line 8 toward Moran →

Preceding station	Seoul Metropolitan Subway	Following station
Munjeong towards Byeollae	Line 8	Bokjeong towards Moran
