= Munjeong-dong Rodeo Street =

Shopping center in Seoul, South Korea

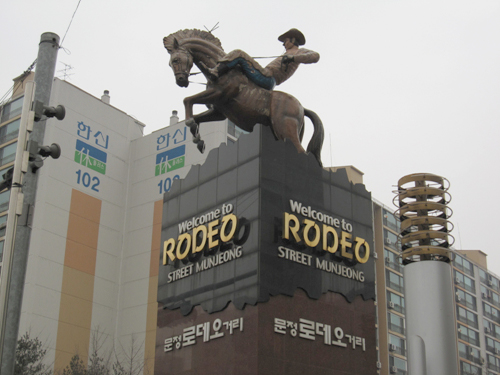

Korean name
- Hangul: 문정동 로데오 거리
- Hanja: 文井洞 로데오 거리
- RR: Munjeong-dong rodeo geori
- MR: Munjŏng-dong rodeo kŏri

Munjeong-dong Rodeo Street (Korean: 문정동 로데오 거리) is a major outlet shopping center in Seoul, South Korea. Clothing of many types is found here, some at substantially discounted rates. Most of the major Korean labels have stores here, as do many international brands.

Due to lack of available streetside space, many stores are located on the basement, 2nd and 3rd floors. One may pick up a map with store locations at the tourist office located on the main street.

This area is accessible from Exit 1 of Munjeong station, a station on Line 8 of the Seoul Subway.

== See also ==
- Apgujeong-dong
- Cheongdam-dong
