= Garak-dong =

Coordinates: 37°30′N 127°07′E

- Neighborhood
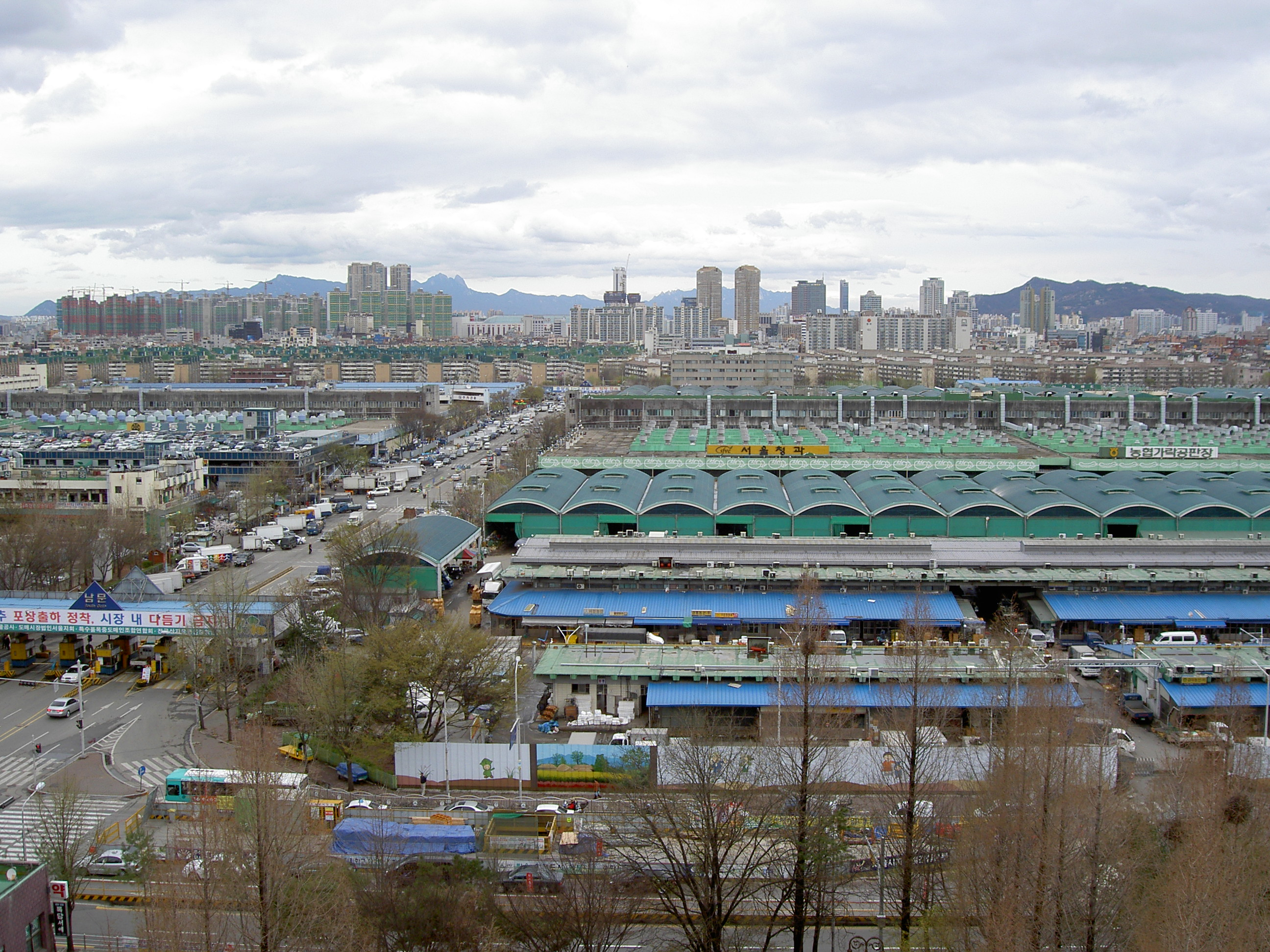
- Garak Market

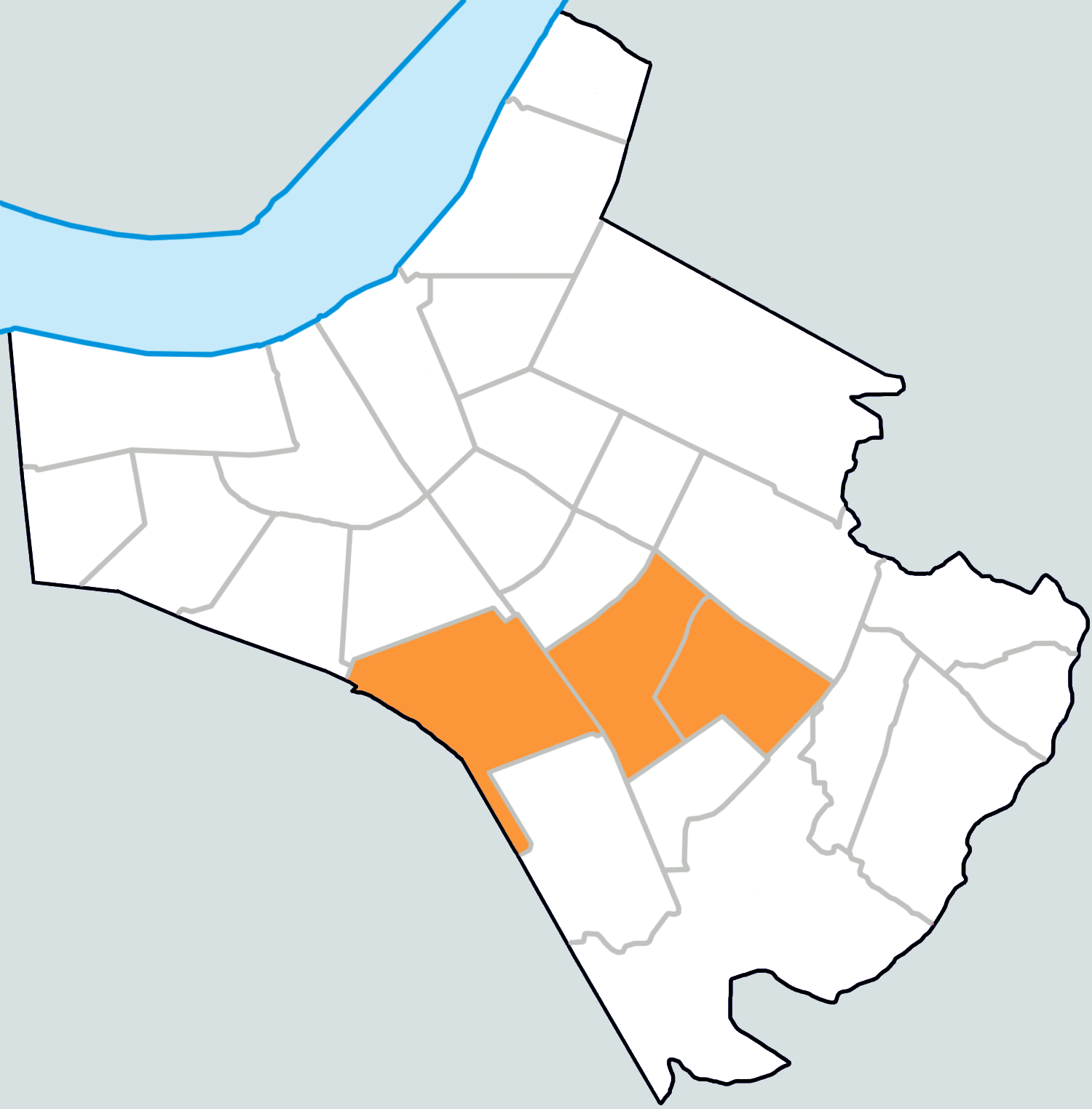
- Country: South Korea

Area
  - Total: 3.44 km^{2} (1.33 sq mi)

Population (2013)
  - Total: 67,251
  - Density: 19,500/km^{2} (50,600/sq mi)

Korean name
- Hangul: 가락동
- Hanja: 可樂洞
- RR: Garak-dong
- MR: Karak-tong

Garak-dong (Korean: 가락동) is a dong (neighborhood) of Songpa District, Seoul, South Korea. The exact etymology is unknown but said that the town was once called garakgol (가락골).

== Overview ==
Garak-dong was originally part of Garak-ri, Jungdae-myeon, Gwangju-gun, starting in 1577. It became Garak-dong when it was incorporated into Seoul during the city's administrative expansion on January 1, 1963. On October 1, 1975, it was transferred to Gangnam-gu, and then to Gangdong-gu on October 1, 1979. On January 1, 1988, Garak-dong became part of the newly established Songpa-gu. The neighborhood's name comes from "Garakgol," an old place name in the area. In October 1989, the northern area of Yangjae-daero was included in Songpa-dong.

== Education ==
Schools located in Garak-dong:

- Seoul Garak Elementary School
- Seoul Singa Elementary School
- Gawon Middle School
- Seokchon Middle School
- Songpa Middle School

== Transportation ==
- Ogeum station of
- Garak Market station of and of

== See also ==
- Administrative divisions of South Korea
- Songpa Heliocity
