= Garak Market station =

Train station in Seoul, South Korea

가락시장; Garak Market
가락시장; Garak Market
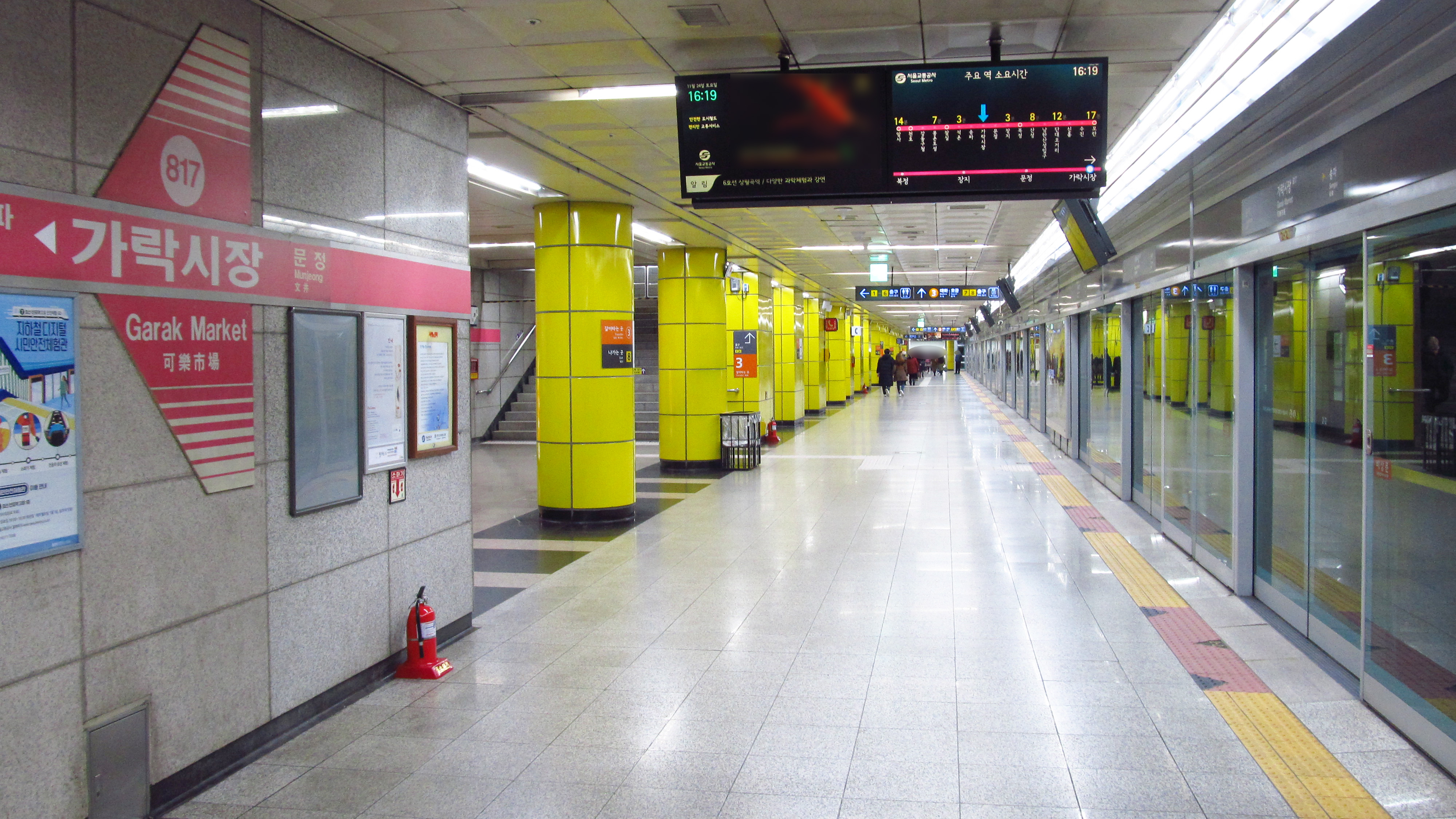
- Line 8

Korean name
- Hangul: 가락시장역
- Hanja: 可樂市場驛
- Revised Romanization: Garaksijang-yeok
- McCune–Reischauer: Karaksijang-yŏk

General information
- Location: 257 Songpa-daero, 298 Garak-dong, Songpa-gu, Seoul
- Coordinates: 37°29′35″N 127°07′05″E
- Operator: Seoul Metro
- Lines: Line 3 Line 8
- Platforms: 4
- Tracks: 4

Construction
- Structure type: Underground

Key dates
- February 18, 2010: Line 3 opened
- November 23, 1996: Line 8 opened

Passengers
- (Daily) Based on Jan-Dec of 2012. Line 3: 16,084; Line 8: 14,353
Location

Garak Market Station is a station on Line 3 and Line 8 of Seoul Metropolitan Subway. Garak Market Station is nearby Garak Market, which is one of the largest whole-sale centers in Seoul. It is also near GS Mart, which is a large supermarket.

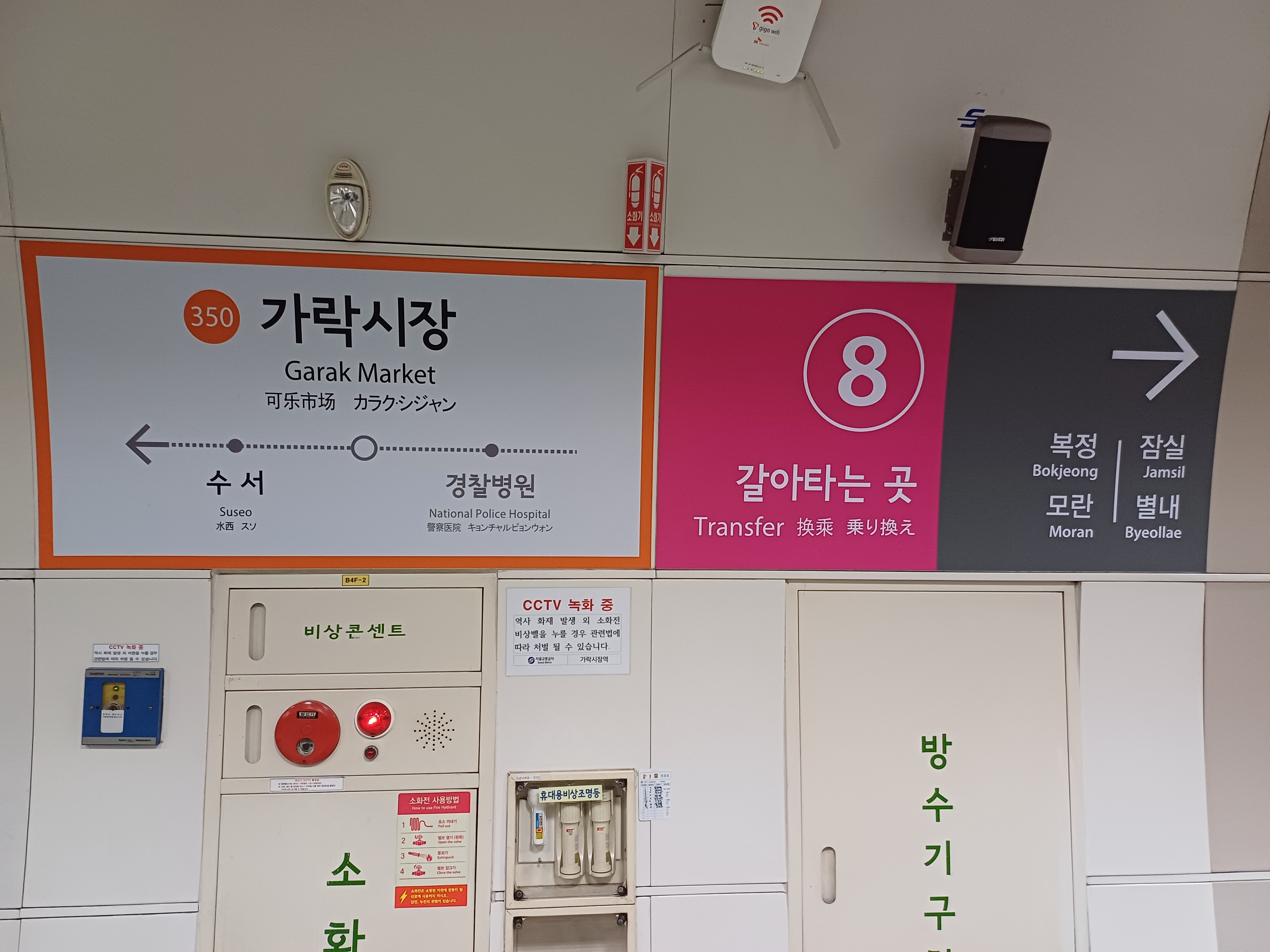
Line 3 station nameplate

== Station layout ==
=== Line 3 ===
Suseo ↑
S/B | | N/B
↓ National Police Hospital

Northbound	← ● Line 3 toward Daehwa
Southbound	● Line 3 toward Ogeum →

=== Line 8 ===
Songpa ↑
S/B | | N/B
↓ Munjeong

Northbound	← ● Line 8 toward Byeollae
Southbound	● Line 8 toward Moran →

Preceding station	Seoul Metropolitan Subway	Following station
Suseo towards Daehwa	Line 3	National Police Hospital towards Ogeum
Songpa towards Byeollae	Line 8	Munjeong towards Moran
