= Munjeong station =

Train station in South Korea

문정; Munjeong
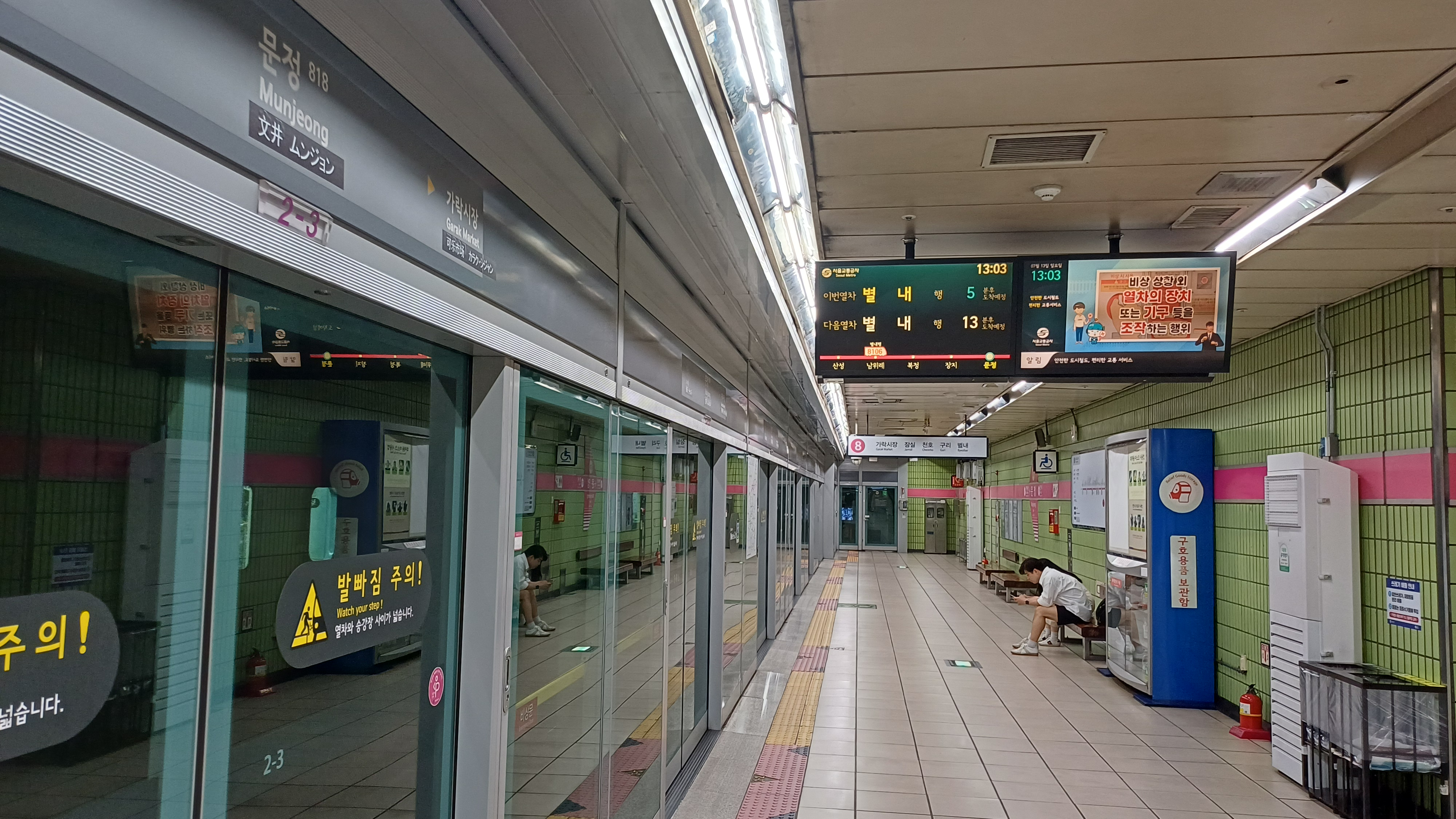

Korean name
- Hangul: 문정역
- Hanja: 文井驛
- Revised Romanization: Munjeong-yeok
- McCune–Reischauer: Munjŏng-yŏk

General information
- Location: 56 Munjeong 2-dong, Songpa-gu, Seoul
- Coordinates: 37°29′09″N 127°07′20″E
- Operator: Seoul Metro
- Line: Line 8
- Platforms: 2
- Tracks: 2

Construction
- Structure type: Underground

Key dates
- November 23, 1996: Line 8 opened
Location

Munjeong is a station on Seoul Subway Line 8. A shopping center sharing the same name is located nearby.

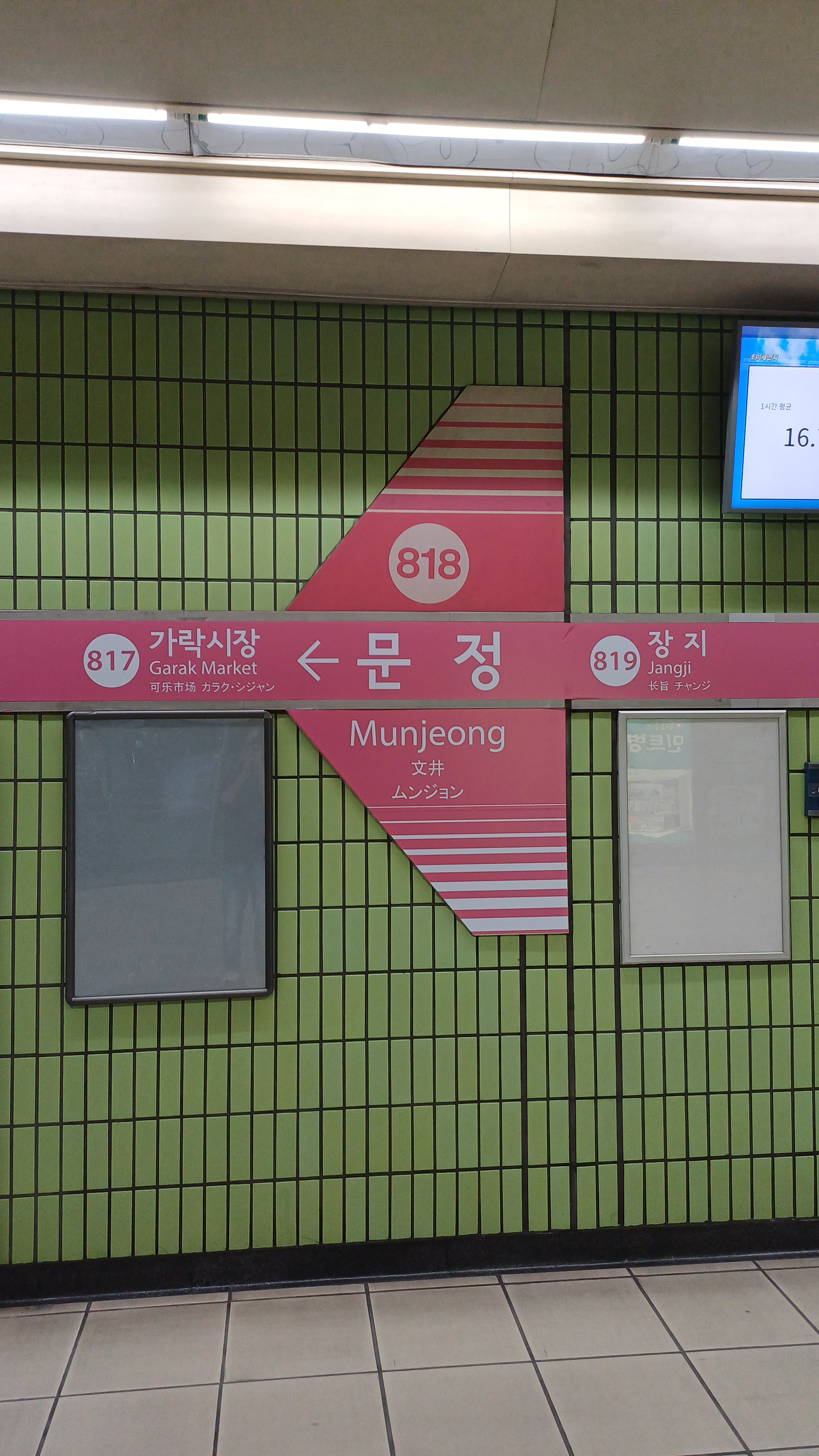
Station nameplate

== Station layout ==
Garak Market ↑
S/B | | N/B
↓ Jangji

Northbound	← ● Line 8 toward Byeollae
Southbound	● Line 8 toward Moran →

Preceding station	Seoul Metropolitan Subway	Following station
Garak Market towards Byeollae	Line 8	Jangji towards Moran
