= Bokjeong station =

Station of the Seoul Metropolitan Subway

복정 (동서울대학); Bokjeong (Dongseoul College)
복정; Bokjeong
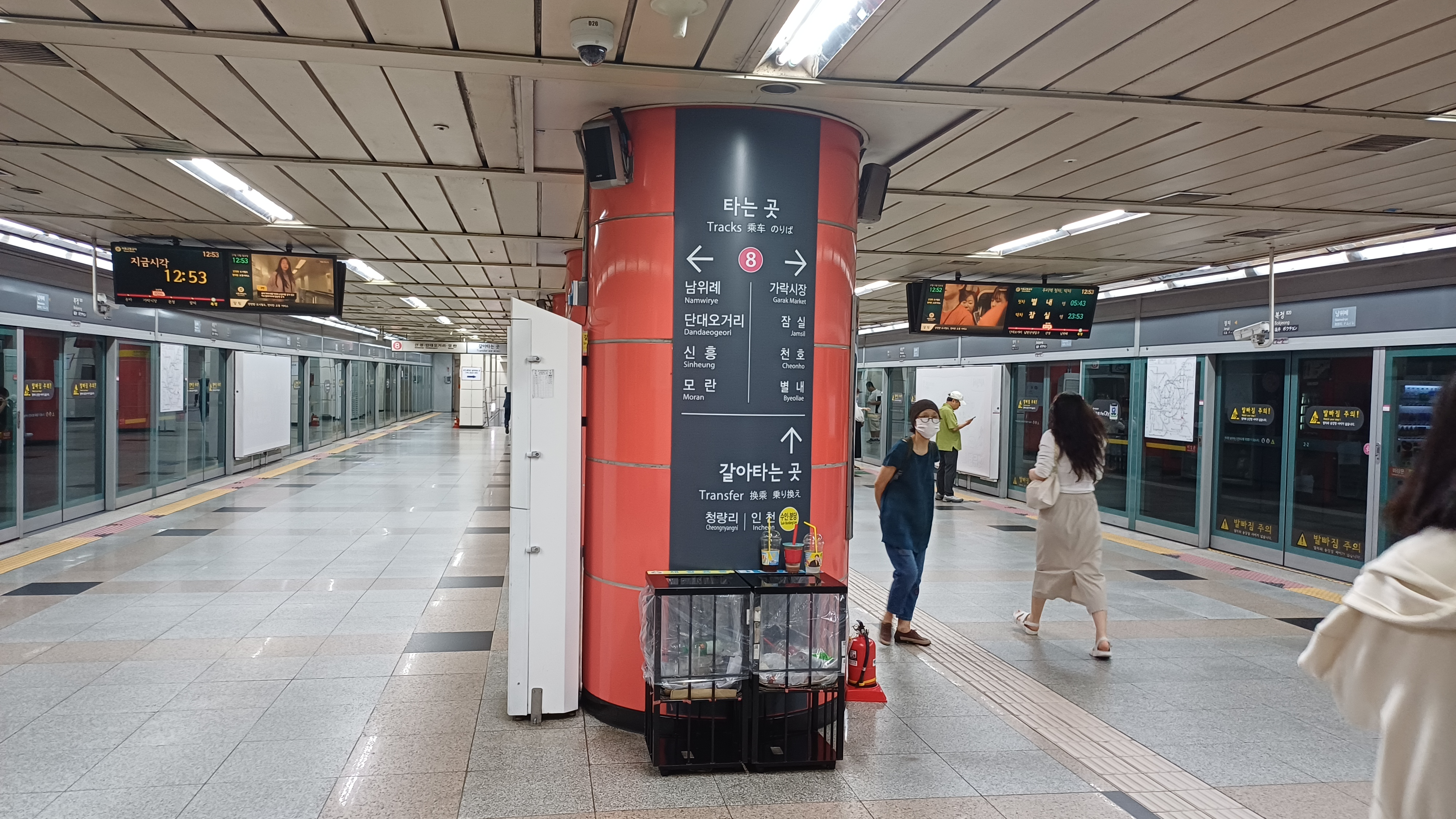
- Line 8 platforms

Korean name
- Hangul: 복정역
- Hanja: 福井驛
- Revised Romanization: Bokjeongnyeok
- McCune–Reischauer: Pokchŏngnyŏk

General information
- Location: 600 Jangji-dong, Songpa-gu, Seoul
- Coordinates: 37°28′15″N 127°07′37″E
- Operator: Seoul Metro; Korail
- Lines: Line 8 Suin–Bundang Line
- Platforms: 2
- Tracks: 4

Construction
- Structure type: Underground

Key dates
- November 23, 1996: Line 8 and Suin–Bundang Line opened
Location

Bokjeong station is a station on Seoul Subway Line 8 and the Suin-Bundang Line. This station has one of the most sophisticated and convenient transfer systems in the Seoul Metropolitan Subway in which the Suin–Bundang Line platform is directly beneath the Line 8 platform. Passengers can transfer between the lines simply by taking one flight of stairs/escalators. However, since the station is situated directly below a major highway interchange with no nearby residential or industrial area, the vicinity of the station has no significant source of passengers, so this station is used mainly as a transfer point.

The only aboveground section of Line 8 lies at Namwirye, although this station & Sanseong are situated underground.

The station is within walking distance of Seoul International School in the city of Seongnam; this station is on the border between Seoul and Seongnam.

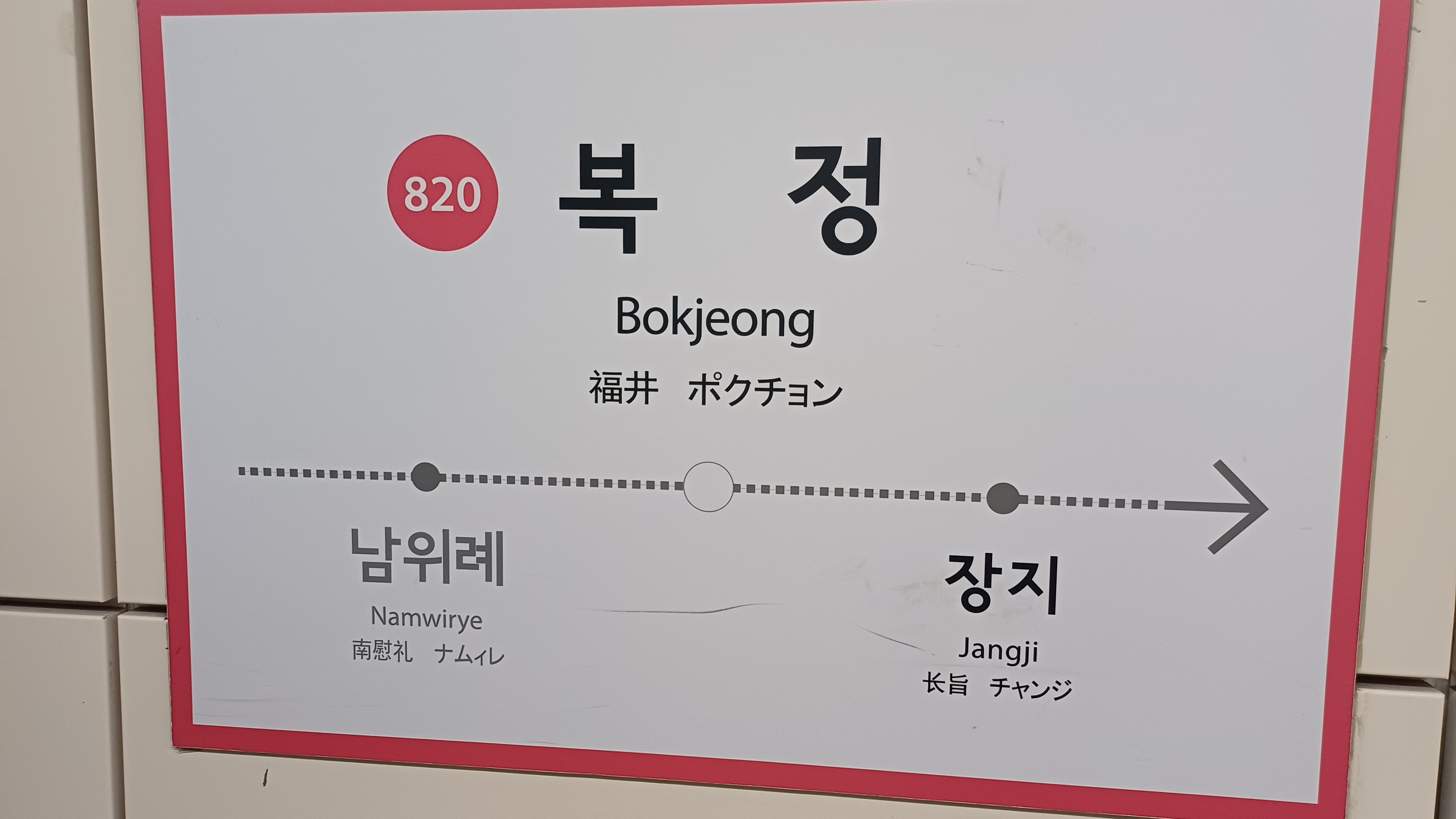
Line 8 station nameplate

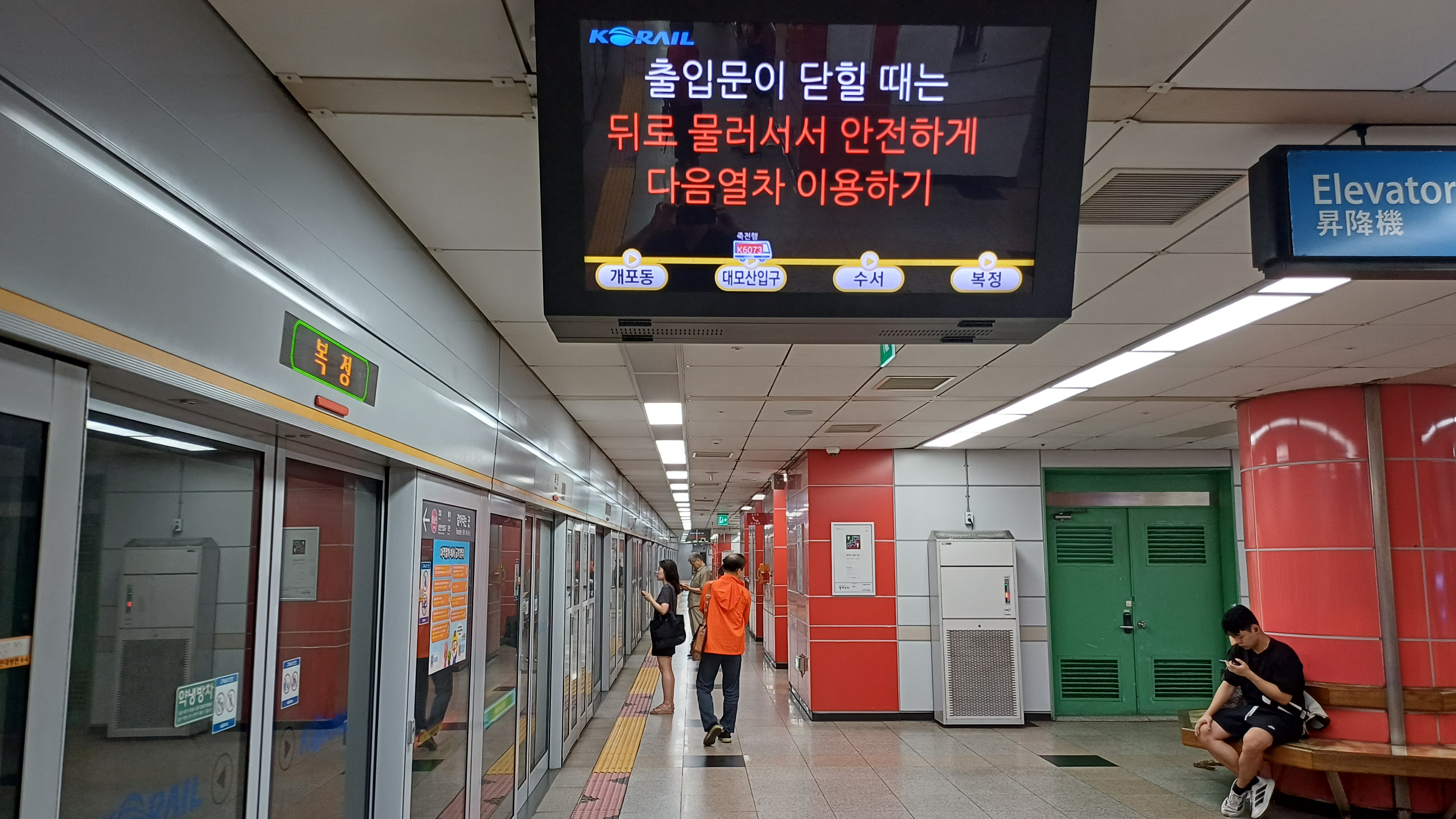
Suin-Bundang Line station platform

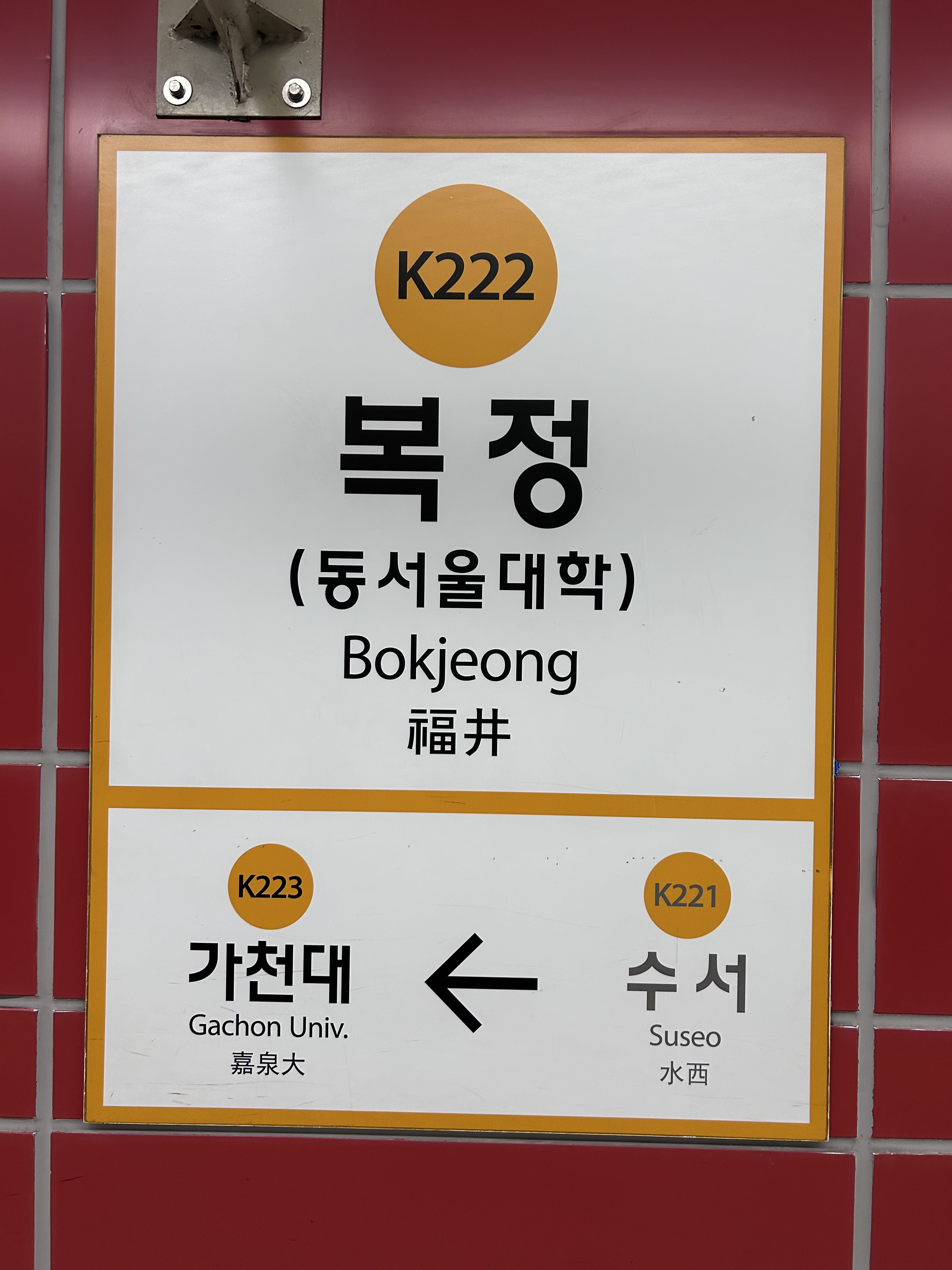
Suin-Bundang Line station nameplate

== Station layout ==
=== Suin–Bundang Line ===
↑ Suseo
2 | | 1
Gachon Univ. ↓

1	●Suin-Bundang Line	for Incheon
2	●Suin-Bundang Line	for Cheongnyangni

=== Line 8 ===
Jangji ↑
| S/B N/B |
↓ Namwirye

Northbound	● Line 8	for Byeollae
Southbound	● Line 8	for Moran

== Vicinity ==
- Exit 1: Jangji-dong
- Exit 2: Dong Seoul College, Bokjeong-dong
- Exit 3: Segok-dong
- Exit 4: Garden 5

Preceding station	Seoul Metropolitan Subway	Following station
Jangji towards Byeollae	Line 8	Namwirye towards Moran
Suseo towards Cheongnyangni	Suin–Bundang Line	Gachon University towards Incheon
