= Square Tomb in Gujeong-dong, Gyeongju =

Tomb in Gyeongju, South Korea

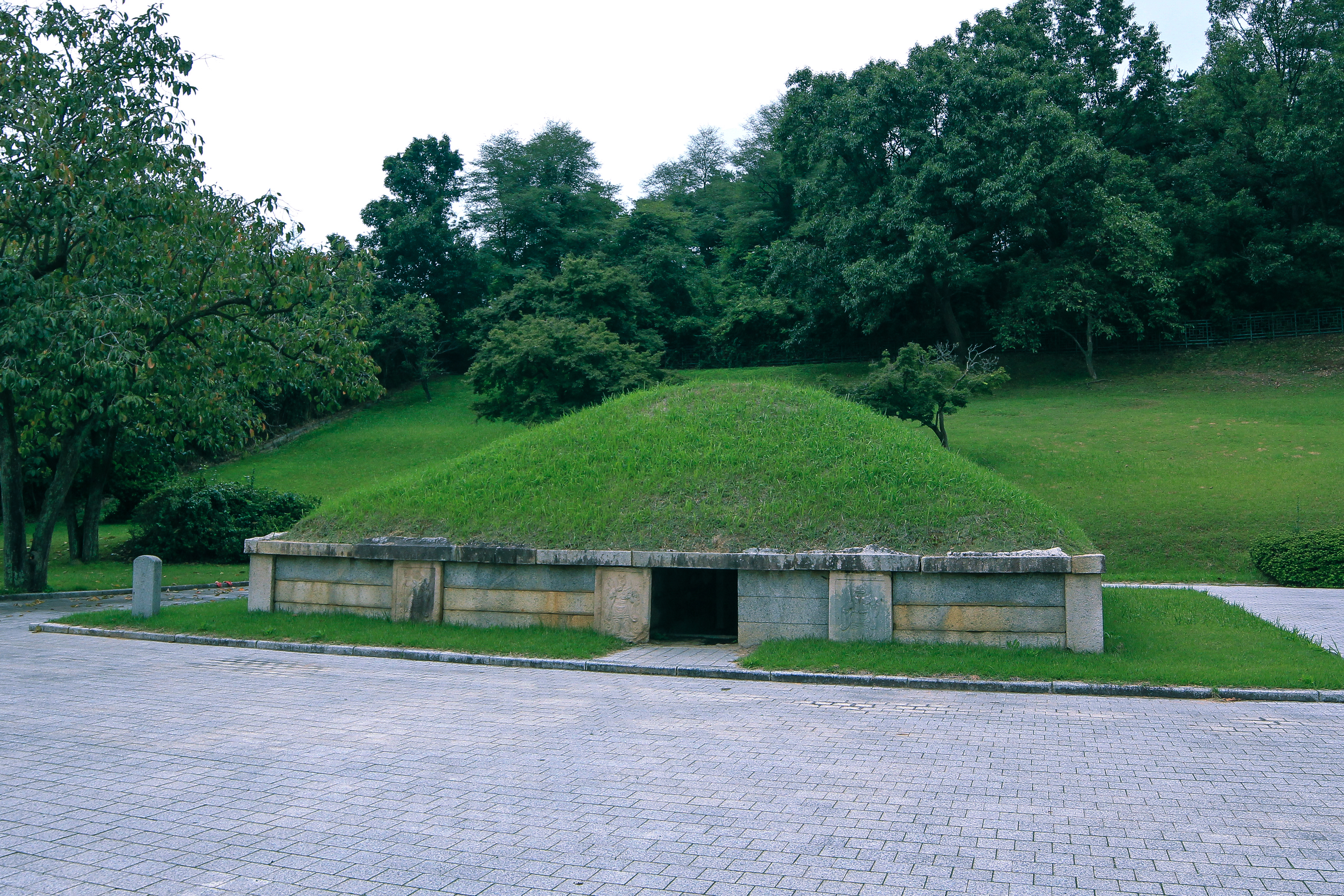
- The tomb (2016)
- Interactive map of Square Tomb in Gujeong-dong, Gyeongju
- Location: Gyeongju, South Korea
- Coordinates: 35°46′42″N 129°17′49″E

Historic Sites of South Korea
- Designated: 1963-01-21
- Reference no.: 27

The Square Tomb in Gujeong-dong, Gyeongju (Korean: 경주 구정동 방형분; Hanja: 慶州九政洞方形墳) is a Unified Silla–era tomb in Gyeongju, South Korea. On January 21, 1963, it was designated Historic Site of South Korea No. 27.

== Description ==
It is not known who the tomb belongs to. The tomb is the only square-shaped tomb in Gyeongju. It is located below the ground, and has a tumulus over it. It is 9.5 m (31 ft) on each side and 3 m (9.8 ft) high. It has statues of animals of the zodiac surrounding it. The tomb was first excavated in 1920. By that point, the tomb had already been robbed. However, gilt-bronze crown ornaments, a silver belt buckle, and other precious items were recovered. The tomb had maintenance work performed on it in 1964.
