= Archaeological Site in Bonghwang-dong, Gimhae =

Archaeological site in Gimhae, South Korea

Coordinates: 35°13′50″N 128°52′34″E

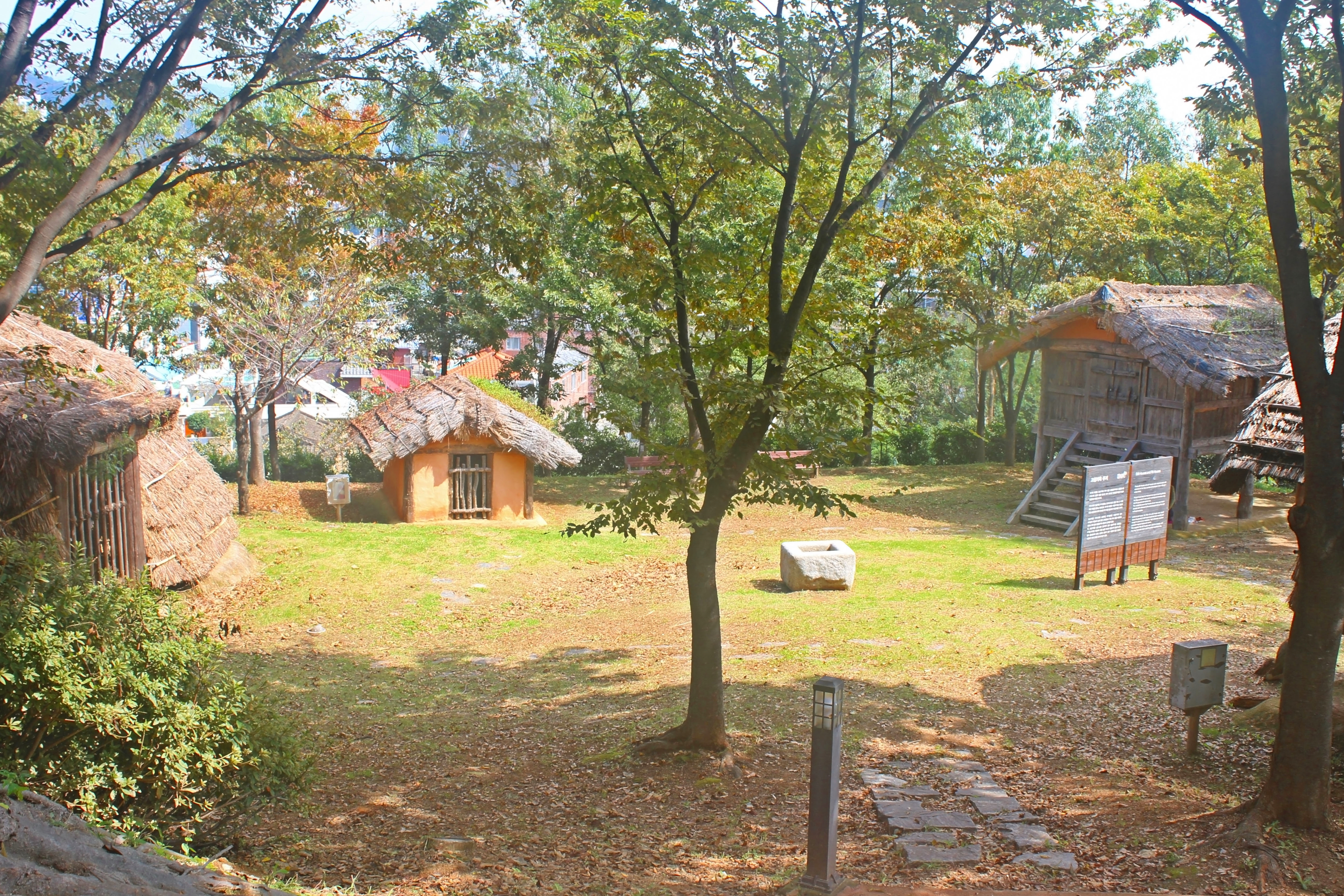
- Part of the complex (2019)
- Interactive map of Archaeological Site in Bonghwang-dong, Gimhae

Historic Sites of South Korea
- Designated: 1963-01-21
- Reference no.: 2

Korean name
- Hangul: 김해 봉황동 유적
- Hanja: 金海 鳳凰洞 遺蹟
- RR: Gimhae Bonghwang-dong yujeok
- MR: Kimhae Ponghwang-dong yujŏk

There is an Bronze Age archaeological site in Gimhae, South Korea. On January 21, 1963 it was made Historic Site of South Korea No. 2. It is a shell midden (dumping ground). It measures 130 m (430 ft) in length, 30 m (98 ft) in width, and 6 to 7 m (20 to 23 ft) in height. Objects discovered in the midden include earthenware, stone tools, carbonized rice, Xin dynasty coinage, and animal bones.
