= Temple Site in Gunsu-ri, Buyeo =

Temple ruins in Buyeo, South Korea

- Part of the site (2017)

Religion
- Affiliation: Korean Buddhism

Location
- Location: Buyeo County, South Chungcheong Province, South Korea
- Interactive map of Temple Site in Gunsu-ri, Buyeo
- Coordinates: 36°16′9″N 126°54′27″E
- Historic Sites of South Korea
- Designated: 1963-01-21
- Reference no.: 44

The Temple Site in Gunsu-ri, Buyeo (Korean: 부여 군수리사지; Hanja: 扶餘軍守里寺址) is the ruins of a Baekje-era Buddhist temple in Gunsu-ri, Buyeo County, South Chungcheong Province, South Korea. On January 21, 1963, it was made Historic Site of South Korea No. 44.

The site was first discovered in 1935, during the Japanese colonial period, by a Japanese person Ishida Mosaku (石田茂作). The temple's layout was identified and a number of artifacts were found. However, Ishida's research attempted to link the temple to Buddhist temples in Japan; a writer for the Encyclopedia of Korean Culture argued such research was done during the colonial period to justify Korea's colonization. It was excavated from 2005 to 2007.
