= Namgoru =

Embankment in Gyeongju, South Korea

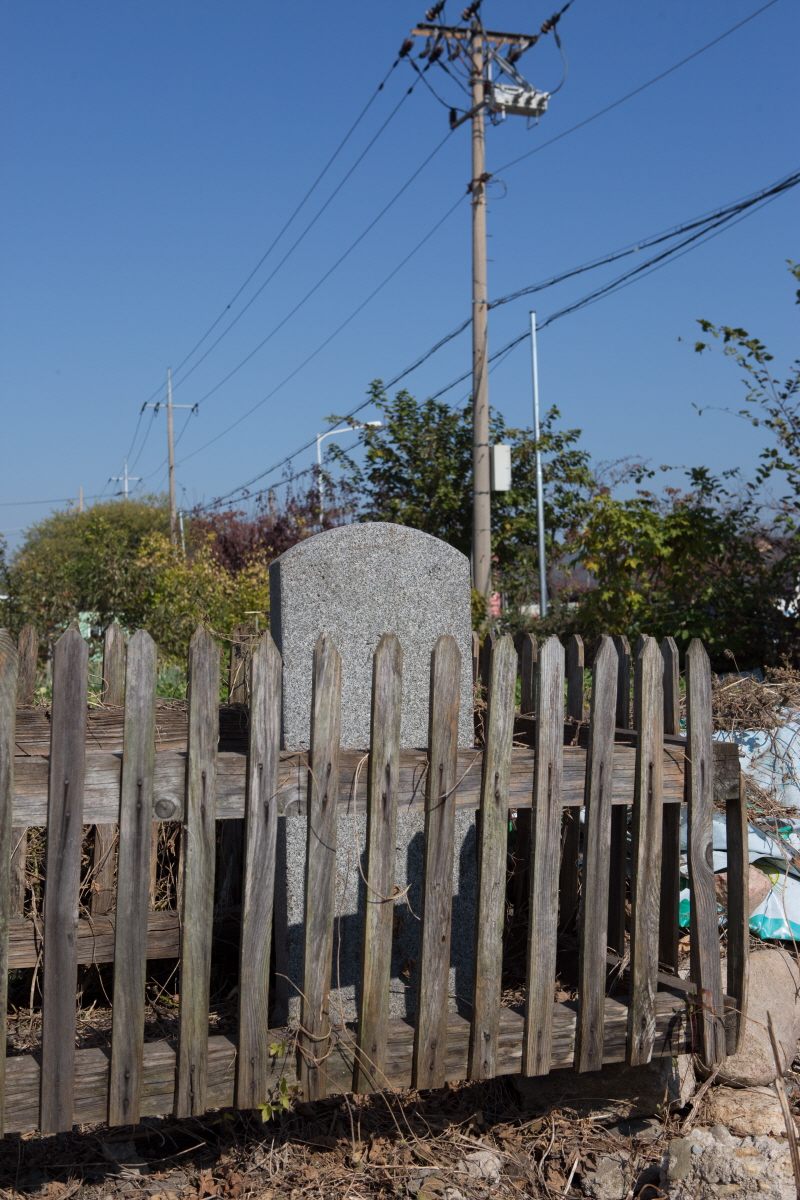
- Monument for Namgoru (2015)
- Interactive map of Namgoru
- Location: Gyeongju, South Korea
- Coordinates: 35°50′31″N 129°13′21″E

Historic Sites of South Korea
- Official name: Namgoru Embankment, Gyeongju
- Designated: 1963-01-21
- Reference no.: 17

Namgoru (Korean: 남고루; Hanja: 南古壘) is a Goryeo-era embankment now located in Gyeongju, South Korea. On January 21, 1963, it was made Historic Site of South Korea No. 17.

It is not known with certainty when the embankment was built. The construction of such an embankment in this general area in 1012 (Korean calendar) is mentioned in the history text Koryŏsa, but it is uncertain if this is the structure in question. Its purpose is also unknown; it was possibly for flood control or for military purposes.

== Gallery ==
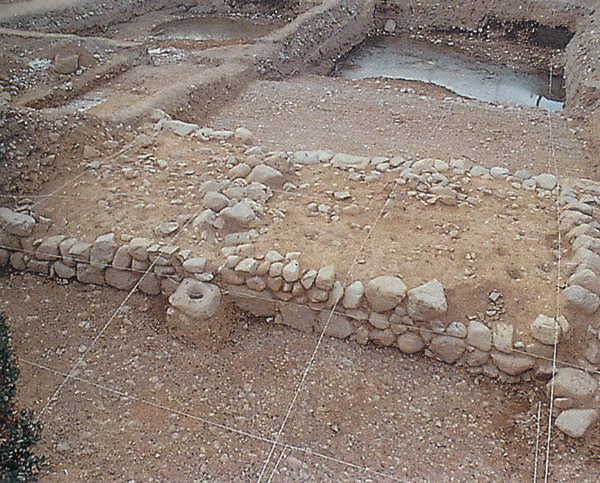
Excavation of a stone area of Namgoru
