= Ancient Tombs in Seongsan-dong, Seongju =

Gaya-era tombs in Seongju, South Korea

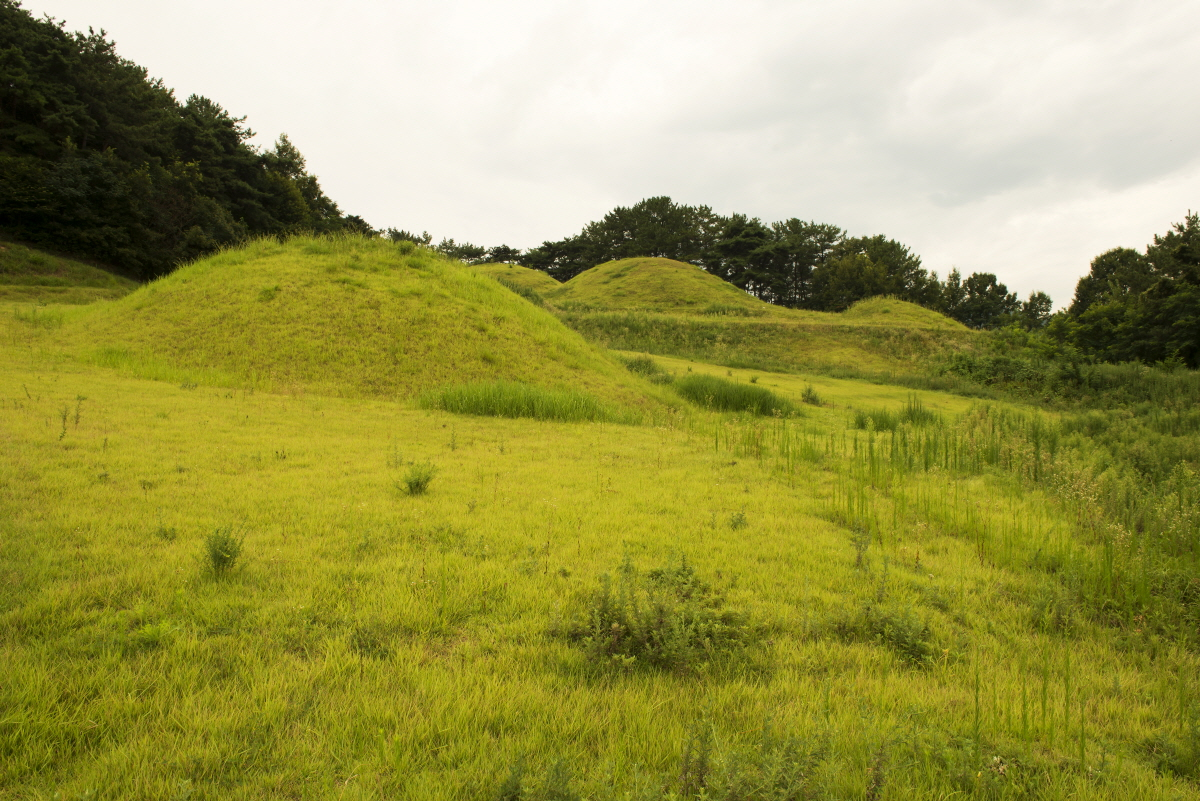
- Several of the tombs (2015)
- Interactive map of Ancient Tombs in Seongsan-dong, Seongju
- Location: Seongju County, North Gyeongsang Province, South Korea
- Coordinates: 35°54′20″N 128°17′54″E

Historic Sites of South Korea
- Designated: 1963-01-21

The Ancient Tombs in Seongsan-dong, Seongju (Korean: 성주 성산동 고분군; Hanja: 星州星山洞古墳群) are Gaya confederacy–era tombs in Seongju County, North Gyeongsang Province, South Korea. On January 21, 1963, they were made Historic Sites of South Korea.

There are around 70 tombs at the site. Various artifacts have been recovered from the tombs, including jewelry and precious metals. Some of the tombs have had artifacts typical of Silla, which indicates possible links between the Gaya elite and Silla, despite the hostile relationship between the two states.
