= Kiln Site in Ssangbuk-ri, Buyeo =

Baekje-era kiln remains in Buyeo, South Korea

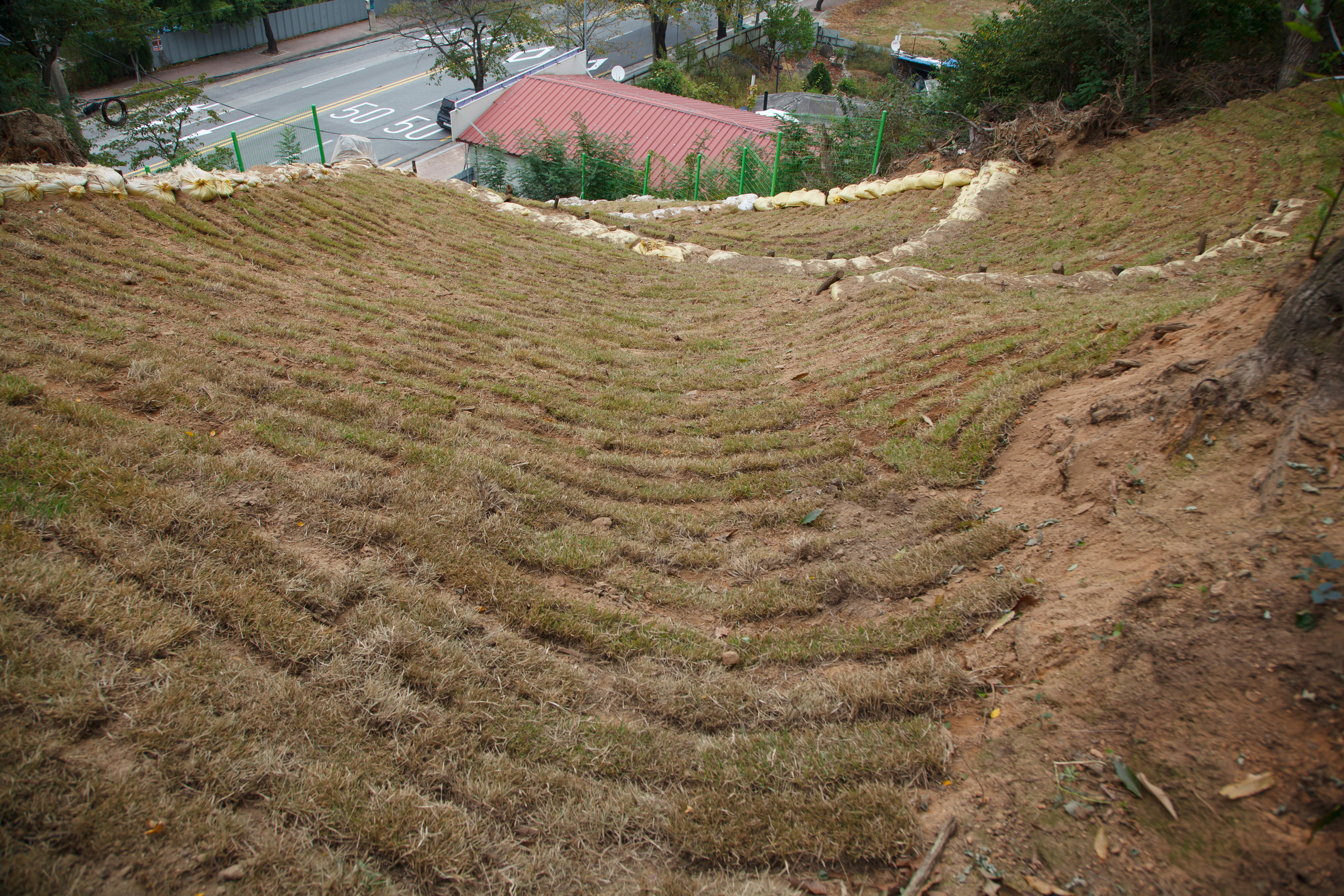
- The site (2021)
- Interactive map of Kiln Site in Ssangbuk-ri, Buyeo
- Location: Buyeo County, South Chungcheong Province, South Korea
- Coordinates: 36°16′50″N 126°55′10″E

Historic Sites of South Korea
- Designated: 1963-01-21

The Kiln Site in Ssangbuk-ri, Buyeo (Korean: 부여 쌍북리 요지; Hanja: 扶餘雙北里窯址) is an archaeological site of Baekje-era kilns in what is now Buyeo County, South Chungcheong Province, South Korea. The site was made a Historic Site of South Korea on January 21, 1963.

It was discovered in 1941 during road construction. Only a part of the kiln remains at present. It is the only known remaining kiln site in Buyeo County.
