= Imjonseong =

Former fortress in Yesan, South Korea

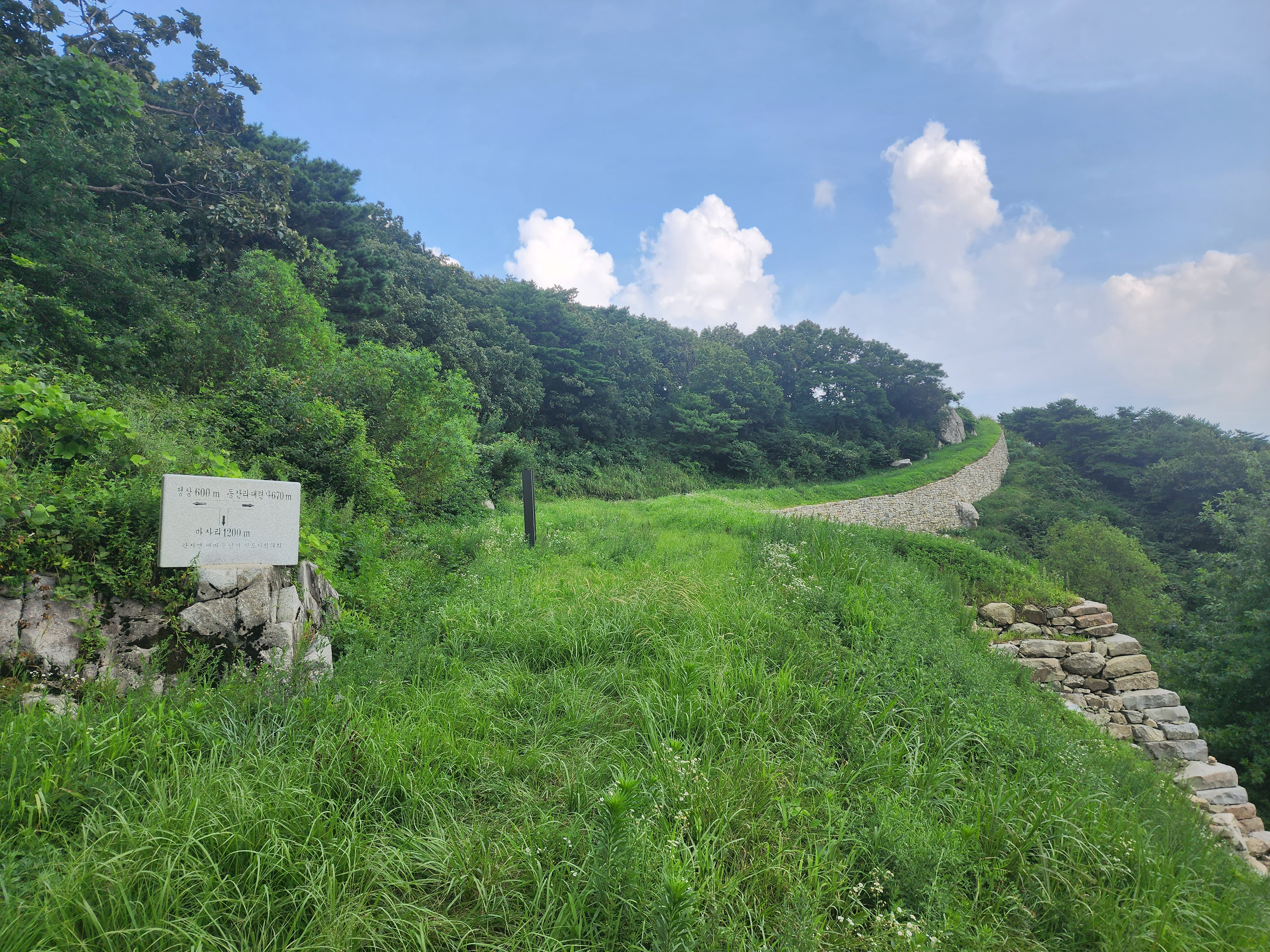
- Part of the remaining wall structure (2023)
- Interactive map of Imjonseong
- Type: Fortress remains
- Location: Yesan County, South Korea
- Coordinates: 36°35′32.3″N 126°46′32.1″E

Historic Sites of South Korea
- Official name: Imjonseong Fortress, Yesan
- Designated: 1963-01-21
- Reference no.: 90

Korean name
- Hangul: 임존성
- Hanja: 任存城
- RR: Imjonseong
- MR: Imjonsŏng

Imjonseong (Korean: 임존성) was a Korean fortress in what is now Yesan County, South Korea. It was designated Historic Site of South Korea No. 90 on January 21, 1963.

The fortress was built by Baekje, one of the Three Kingdoms of Korea, as an outpost, presumably against the invasion of Goguryeo. It was located at the top of the mountain and was surrounded by a thick wall reinforced by stone. The circumference of the wall was approximately 3 kilometres (1.9 mi).

Currently, only remains of two gates, of a well, and of an unidentified building are present on the site.
