= Wŏnwŏnsa =

Silla-era temple in Gyeongju, South Korea

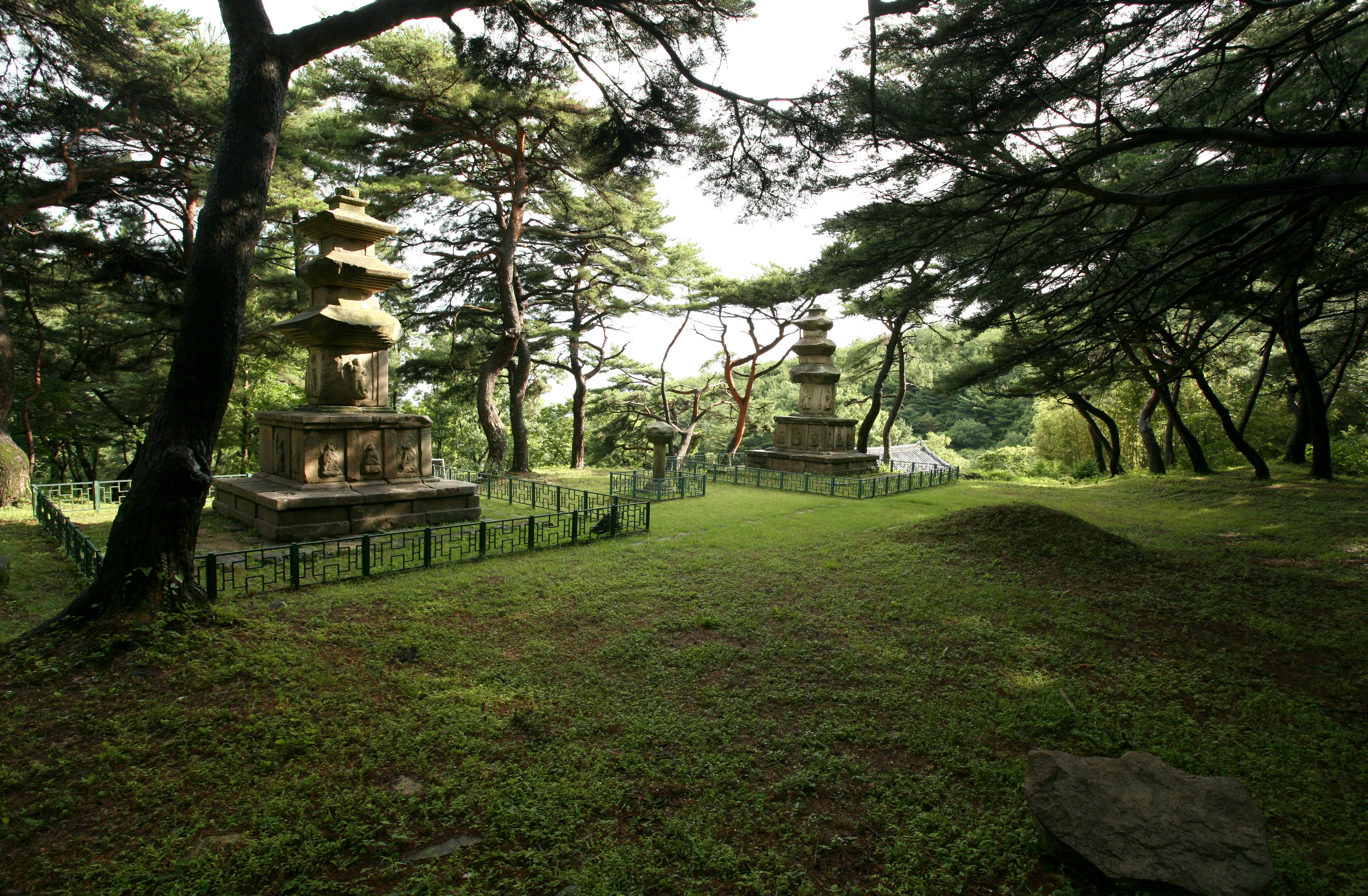
- Main hall site

Religion
- Affiliation: Korean Buddhism

Location
- Location: Gyeongju, South Korea
- Interactive map of Wŏnwŏnsa
- Coordinates: 35°41′50″N 129°21′1″E
- Historic Sites of South Korea
- Official name: Wonwonsa Temple Site, Gyeongju
- Designated: 1963-01-21
- Reference no.: 46

Wŏnwŏnsa (Korean: 원원사; Hanja: 遠願寺) was a Unified Silla-era Buddhist temple in what is now Oedong, Gyeongju, South Korea. On January 21, 1963, its former location was made a Historic Site of South Korea No. 46.

The temple is believed to have been built by the monks Anhye and Nangyung, followers of esoteric Buddhism. The site of its former main hall has two three-story stone pagodas and a stone lantern. They were restored during the 1910–1945 Japanese colonial period. The style of the temple is characteristic of the Unified Silla period. The temple was possibly active until the late Joseon period (1392–1910).
