= Chusansŏng =

Former fortress in Goryeong, South Korea

- Ruins of the fortress wall
- Interactive map of the Chusansŏng area

General information
- Location: Goryeong County, North Gyeongsang Province, South Korea
- Coordinates: 35.732°N 128.253°E

Design and construction
- Designations

Historic Sites of South Korea
- Designated: 1963-01-21
- Reference no.: 61

Chusansŏng (Korean: 주산성; Hanja: 主山城; RR: Jusanseong) was a Gaya-era Korean fortress in what is now Goryeong County, North Gyeongsang Province, South Korea. It also went by the name Isansŏng (이산성; 耳山城; Isanseong) On January 21, 1963, it was made Historic Site of South Korea No. 61.

It was built on the mountain Jusan. Relics that were characteristic of Gaya culture of the 5th to 6th centuries have been found at the site. It had two sets of walls. The inner walls were in a long oval shape. Both sets are mostly collapsed.
