= Temple Site in Janghang-ri, Gyeongju =

Silla-era ruins in Gyeongju, South Korea

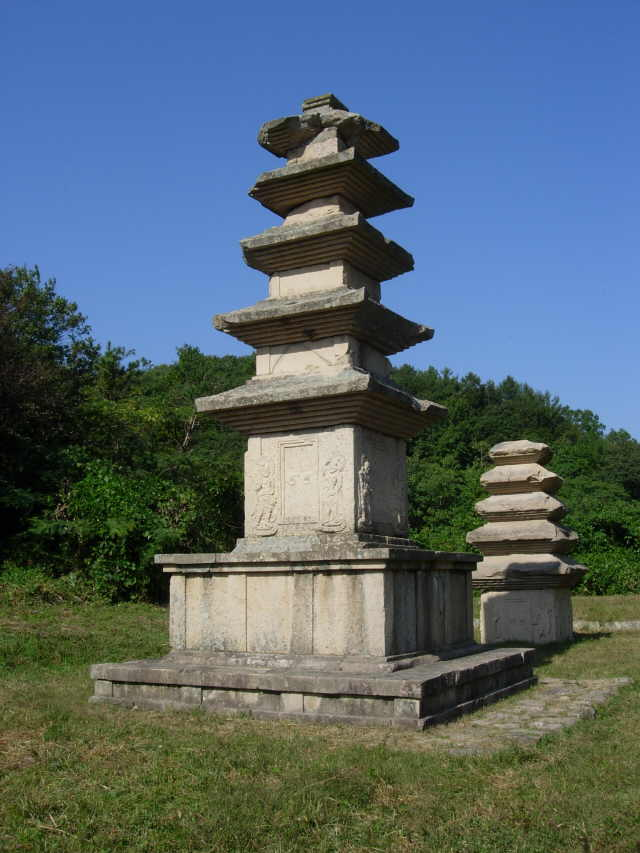
- Pagodas at the site (2006)

Religion
- Affiliation: Korean Buddhism

Location
- Interactive map of Temple Site in Janghang-ri, Gyeongju
- Coordinates: 35°46′29″N 129°22′21″E
- Historic Sites of South Korea
- Designated: 1963-01-21
- Reference no.: 45

The Temple Site in Janghang-ri, Gyeongju (Korean: 경주 장항리 사지; Hanja: 慶州獐項里寺址) is the ruins of a Unified Silla-era Buddhist temple in Munmudaewang-myeon, Gyeongju, South Korea. On January 21, 1963, it was made Historic Site of South Korea No. 45.

Its original name, nor its date of construction, are not known with certainty. The most significant of its remains are two pagodas at the site. It was possibly rather small. The foundations of a building have been identified. One of its pagodas was restored in 1932 after it was blown up by robbers who wanted the treasures inside. The two pagodas were possibly originally of the same shape and size, although they now differ in form.
