= Ancient Tombs in Singi-ri, Yangsan =

Silla-era tombs in Yangsan, South Korea

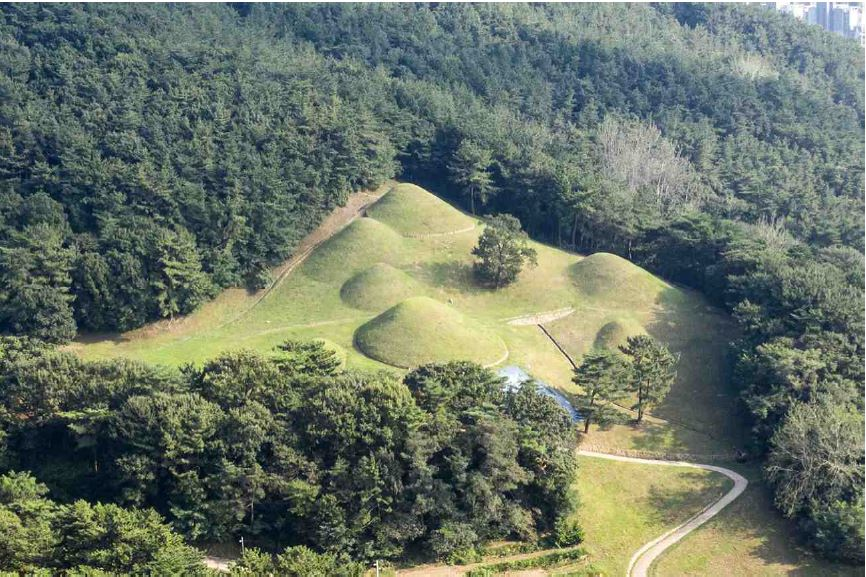
- Some of the tombs
- Interactive map of Ancient Tombs in Singi-ri, Yangsan
- Location: Yangsan, South Korea
- Coordinates: 35°20′50″N 129°3′57″E
- Built: Silla period

Historic Sites of South Korea
- Designated: 1963-01-21

The Ancient Tombs in Singi-ri, Yangsan (Korean: 양산 신기리 고분군; Hanja: 粱山新基里古墳群) are Silla-era tombs now in Yangsan, South Korea. On January 21, 1963, they were made a Historic Site of South Korea.

There are about 53 tumulus tombs of varying sizes in the area. They were made around the 6th to 7th centuries. One of the tombs is a jar coffin. Preservation work was carried out on the tombs between 1990 and 2005. An excavation was carried out in 2005.
