= Samyang-dong Prehistoric Site =

Archaeological site in Jeju City, South Korea

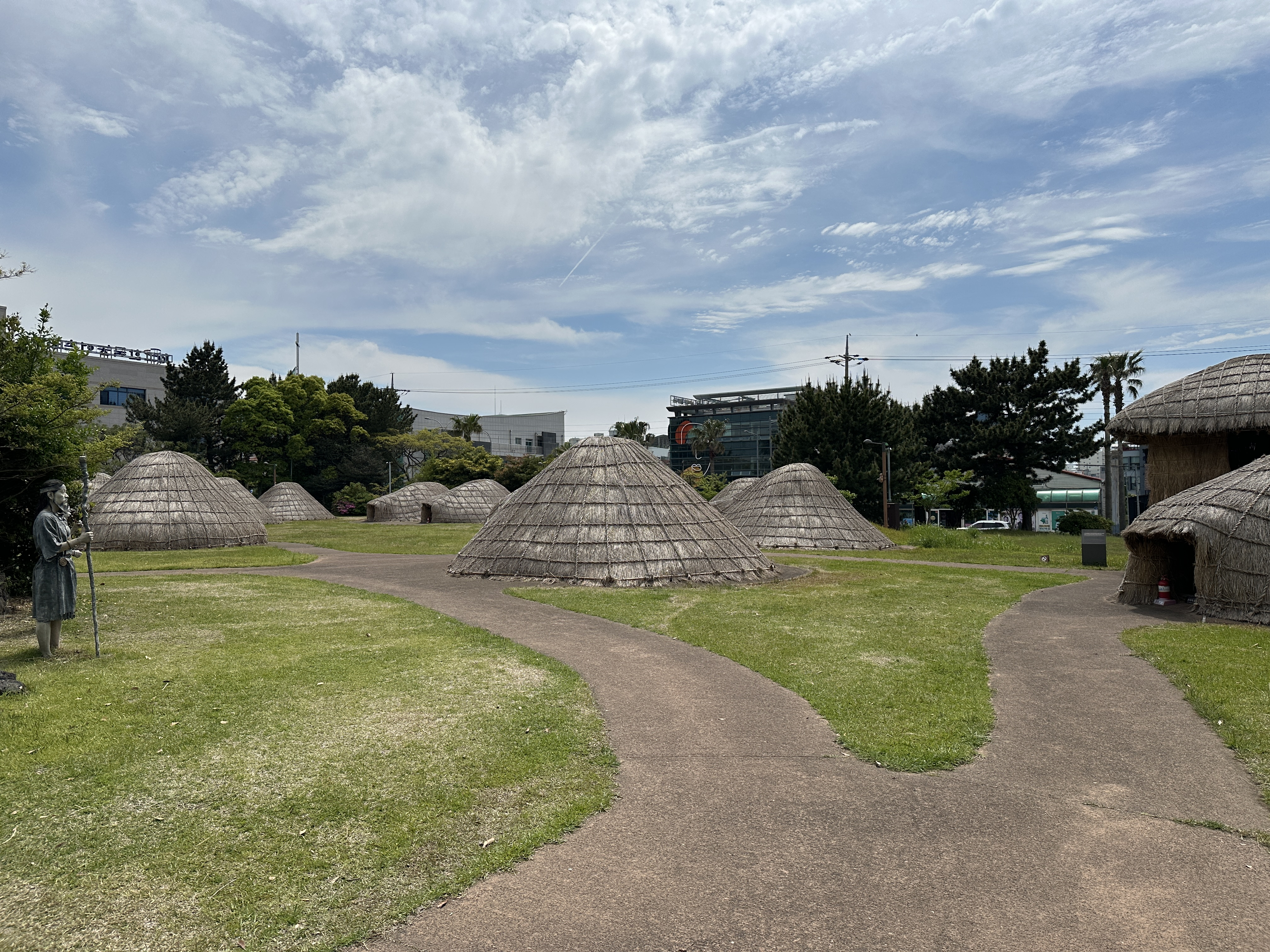
- View of reconstructed structures at part of the site (2026)
- Interactive map of Samyang-dong Prehistoric Site
- Coordinates: 33.5232°N 126.5877°E

Historic Sites of South Korea
- Official name: Archaeological Site in Samyang-dong, Jeju
- Designated: 1999-11-16

Korean name
- Hangul: 삼양동 유적
- Hanja: 三陽洞遺蹟
- RR: Samyang-dong yujeok
- MR: Samyang-dong yujŏk

Samyang-dong Prehistoric Site (Korean: 삼양동 유적) is an archaeological site in Samyang-dong, Jeju City, Jeju Province, South Korea. It is now a designated Historic Site of South Korea.

The site was discovered during construction work in the area. Excavation was done from April 1997 to July 1999. It revealed a fairly large settlement of 236 ancient housing sites that date to around 3,000 years ago. Clay pottery and stone, iron, and bronze tools were discovered. Some artifacts appear to be from the Korean peninsula and China. Further excavations in the vicinity suggest that the settlement extended well beyond the boundaries of the area of the initial excavation. For example, south of the area there are numerous tombs.

The site is the largest known of its kind in Jeju from this time period. It has been highly informative as to the lifestyles and cross-regional interactions of people of this period.

== Gallery ==
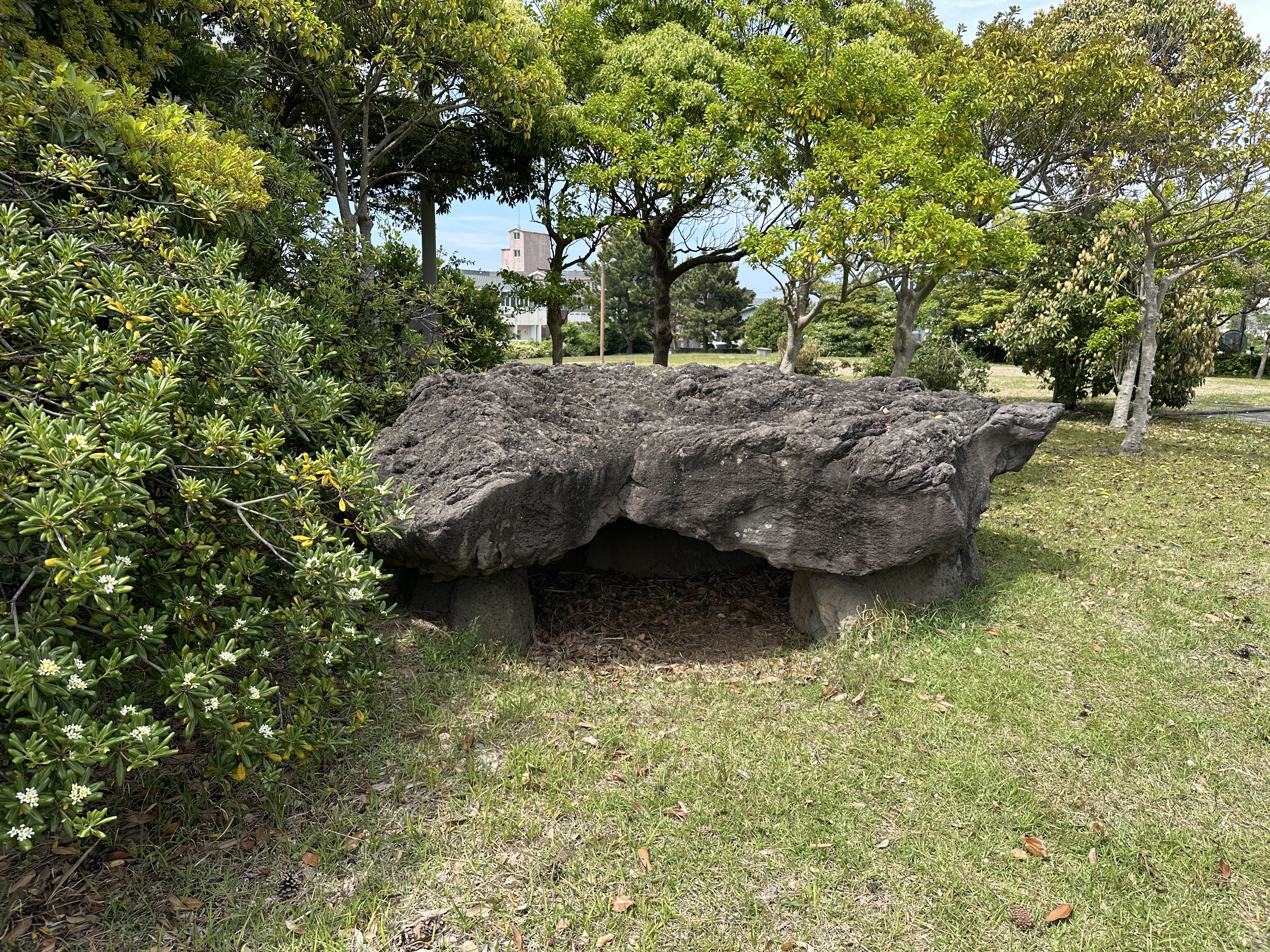
A dolmen at the site (2026)

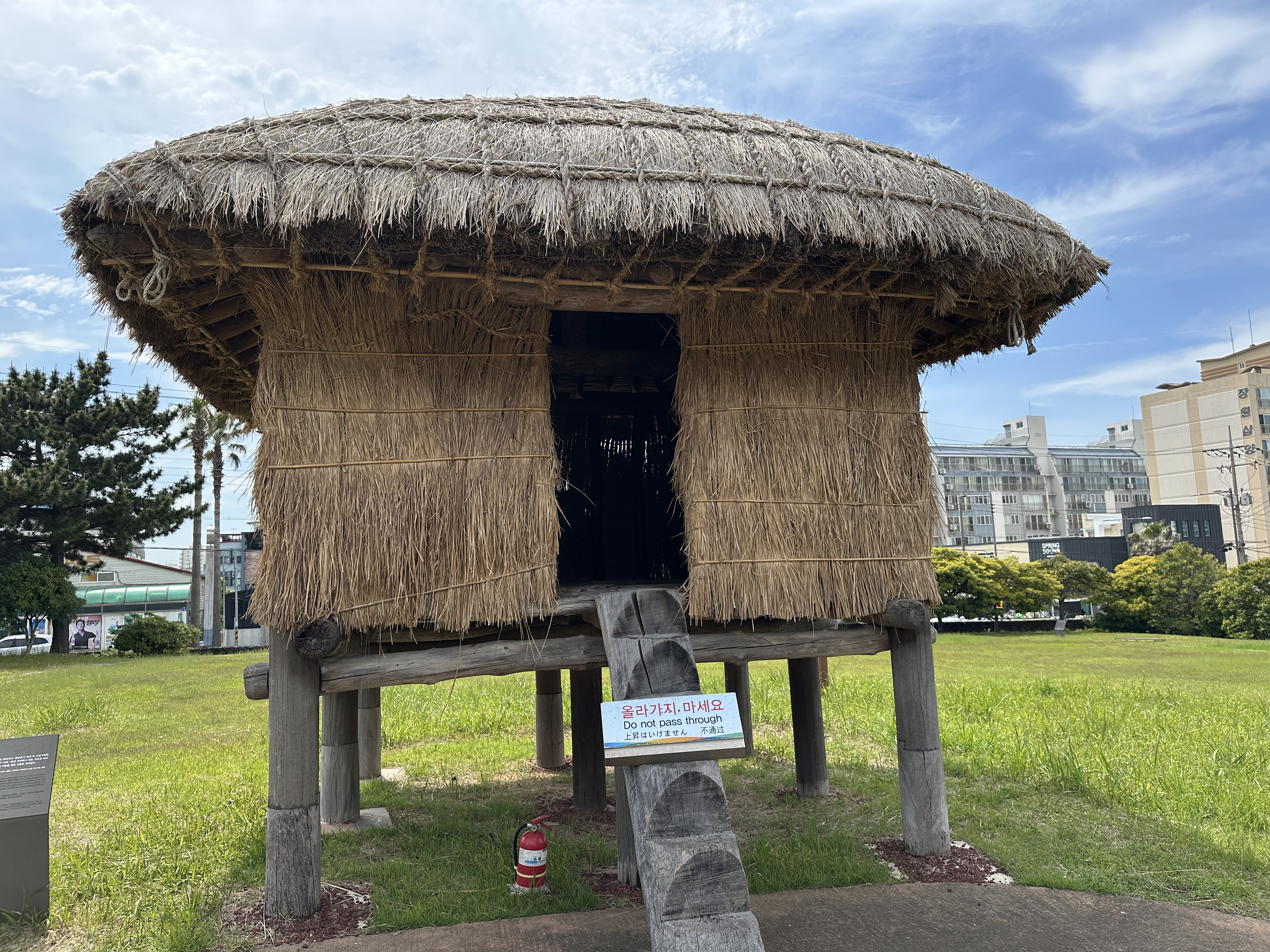
A reconstructed elevated storage building (2026)
