= Kŏnjisansŏng =

Fortress in Seocheon, South Korea

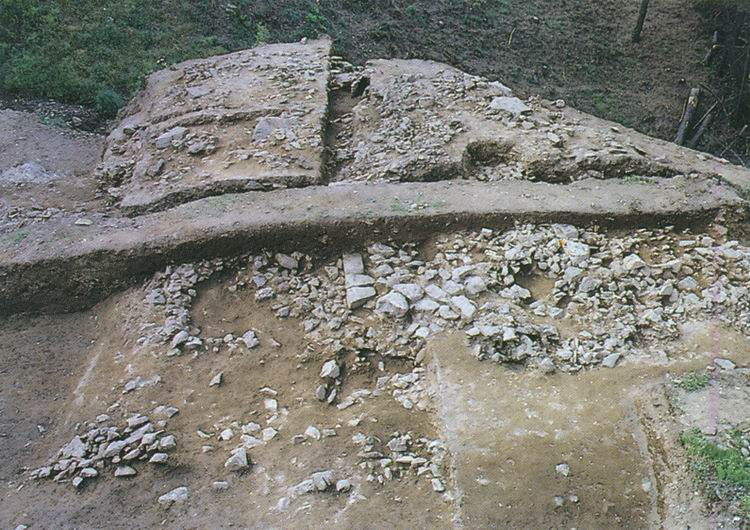
- Ruins of a building of the fortress
- Interactive map of the Kŏnjisansŏng area

General information
- Location: Seocheon County, South Chungcheong Province, South Korea
- Coordinates: 36.087°N 126.796°E

Design and construction
- Designations

Historic Sites of South Korea
- Designated: 1963-01-21
- Reference no.: 60

Kŏnjisansŏng (Korean: 건지산성; Hanja: 乾芝山城; RR: Geonjisanseong) was a Korean fortress in Seocheon County, South Chungcheong Province, South Korea. On January 21, 1963, it was made Historic Site of South Korea No. 60.

It is located on the mountain Geonjisan. It was built possibly around the Baekje period; precise dates are unknown. Excavations on it began in 1999. A building in its site from the late Joseon period was confirmed. A small Buddhist temple called Bongseosa was inside the walls.
