= Mansion Site in Seongdong-dong, Gyeongju =

Silla-era ruins in Gyeongju, South Korea

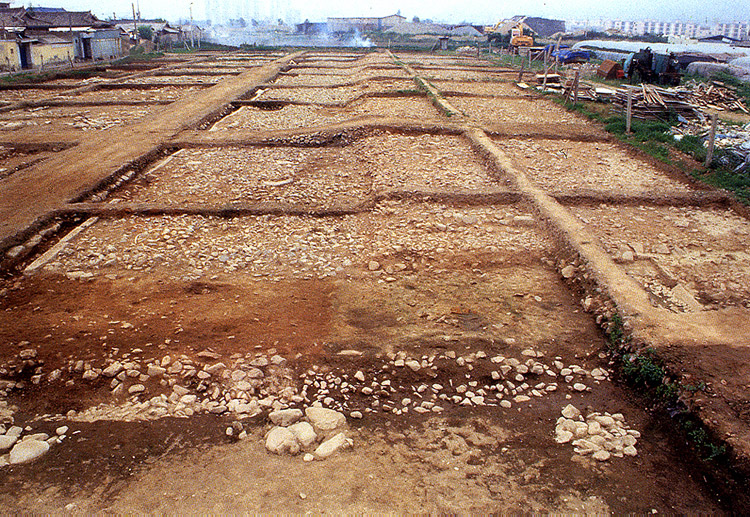
- Dig at the site (2003)
- Interactive map of Mansion Site in Seongdong-dong, Gyeongju
- Location: Gyeongju, South Korea
- Coordinates: 35°50′41″N 129°13′27″E

Historic Sites of South Korea
- Designated: 1963-01-21

The Mansion Site in Seongdong-dong, Gyeongju (Korean: 경주 성동동 전랑지; Hanja: 慶州城東洞殿廊址) is an archaeological site in Seongdong-dong, Gyeongju, South Korea. On January 21, 1963, it was designated a Historic Site of South Korea.

The site was first discovered during a public works project in 1937. It is believed to be a site of a complex of buildings from the Unified Silla period that possibly belonged to the local government or a noble. Various relics, including tiles and bowls, have been recovered from the site.
