= Ancient Tombs in Bukjeong-ri, Yangsan =

Silla-era tombs in Yangsan, South Korea

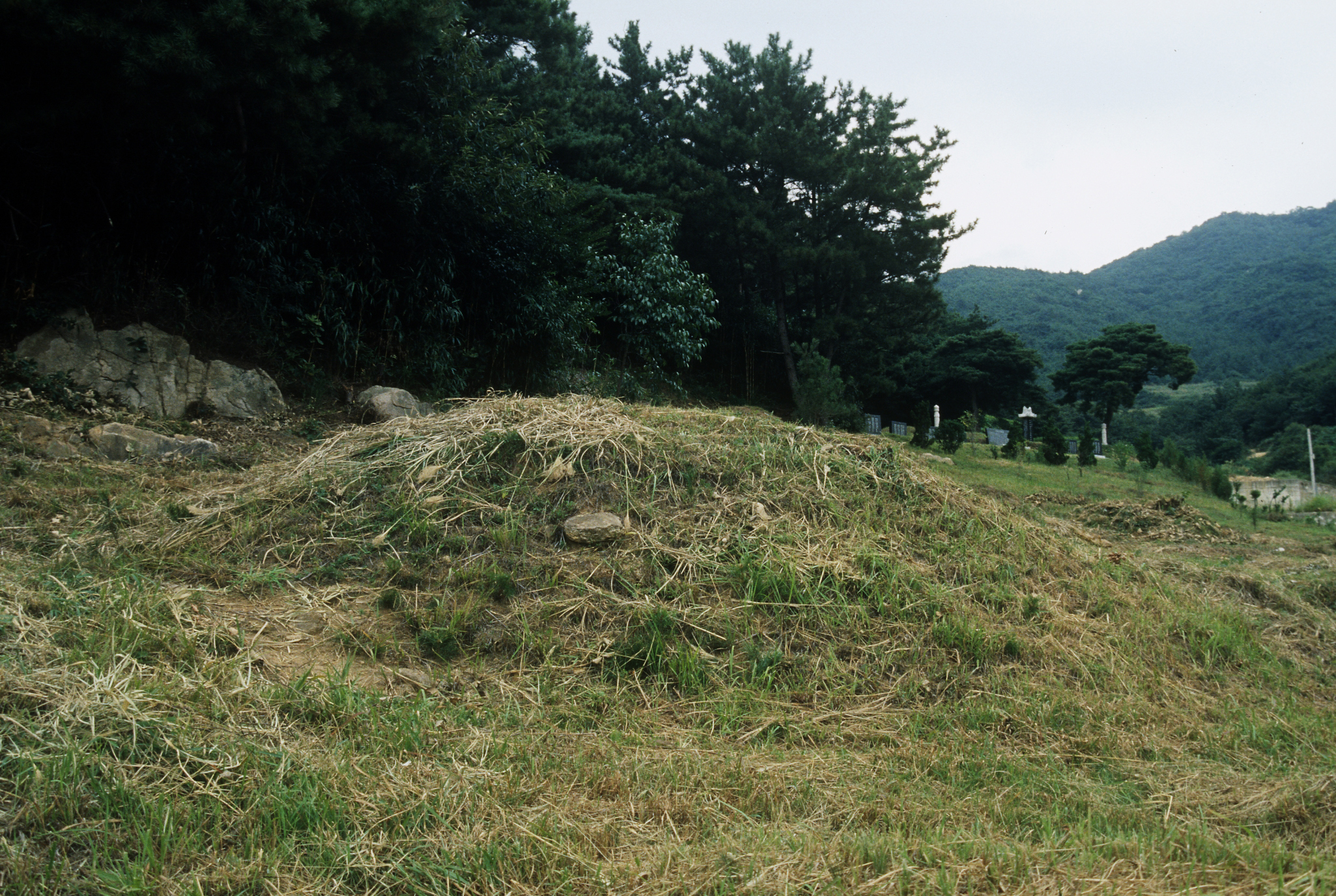
- One of the tombs
- Interactive map of Ancient Tombs in Bukjeong-ri, Yangsan
- Location: Yangsan, South Korea
- Coordinates: 35°21′23″N 129°2′59″E

Historic Sites of South Korea
- Designated: 1963-01-21

The Ancient Tombs in Bukjeong-ri, Yangsan (Korean: 양산 북정리 고분군; Hanja: 梁山北亭里古墳群) are Silla-era tombs in Yangsan, South Korea. On January 21, 1963, they were made a Historic Site of South Korea.

There are around 50 of these tumulus tombs. Excavations on them began in 1920, with an excavation on tomb no. 18. They are divided into eastern and western sections.
