= Ancient Tombs in Geumcheok-ri, Gyeongju =

Tombs in Gyeongju, South Korea

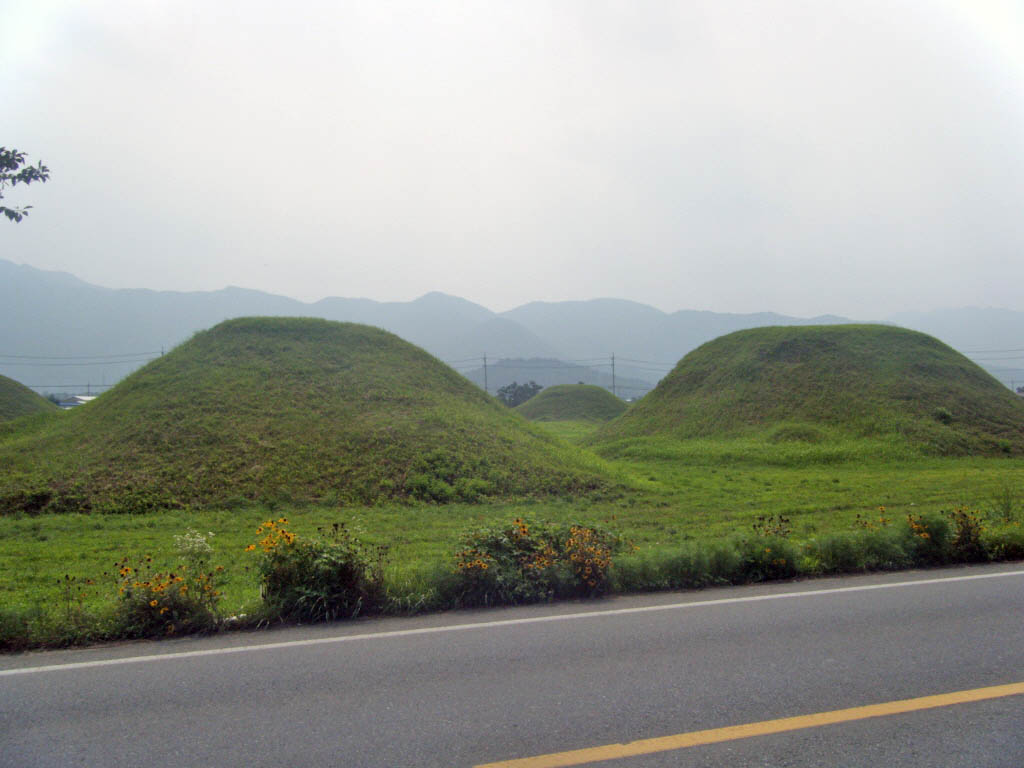
- Several of the tombs (2010)
- Interactive map of Ancient Tombs in Geumcheok-ri, Gyeongju
- Location: Geumcheok-ri, Gyeongju, South Korea
- Coordinates: 35°50′00″N 129°07′12″E

Historic Sites of South Korea
- Designated: 1963-01-21
- Reference no.: 43

The Ancient Tombs in Geumcheok-ri, Gyeongju (Korean: 경주 금척리 고분군; Hanja: 慶州金尺里古墳群) are Silla-era tombs in Geumcheok-ri, Gyeongju, South Korea. On January 21, 1963, they were designated Historic Site of South Korea No. 43.

The site has 52 tumulus tombs of various sizes. Most of them are round mounds, but one has two round mounds that are connected to each other. They are consistently smaller than the tombs at Daereungwon. Many of them have yet to be excavated. Two of them that were partially destroyed were excavated in 1952, and gold and jade artifacts were recovered. In 1976, small tombs of the complex were discovered for the first time. In 1981, several tombs that were unknowingly destroyed during the construction of a private house were excavated. They are believed to house various lower-level nobles of Silla.
