= Historic Sites (South Korea) =

Designation for historic places

- Hangul: 사적
- Hanja: 史蹟
- RR: Sajeok
- MR: Sajŏk

Historic Sites (Korean: 사적) is a national-level designation within the heritage preservation system of South Korea for places of important historical value. It is managed by the Administrator of the Cultural Heritage Administration, under article 25 of Cultural Heritage Protection Act of South Korea.

More recent structures, namely those from the late 19th century to the 1940s, are not eligible for listing as "Historic Sites", but rather may be officially listed under the designation 'Cultural Heritage of Early Modern Times' under 'Registered Cultural Heritage'. This can be done "if they are highly valuable and on the verge of destruction or deterioration".

== List of Historic Sites ==
Missing numbers in each table indicate cancelled designations.

=== Designation number from 1 – 100 ===
No	Official name in English	Official name in Korean	Location	Date of designation
1	Poseokjeong Pavilion Site, Gyeongju	경주 포석정지; 慶州 鮑石亭址	Gyeongju, North Gyeongsang	1963-01-21
2	Archaeological Site in Bonghwang-dong, Gimhae	김해 봉황동 유적; 金海 鳳凰洞 遺蹟	Gimhae, South Gyeongsang	1963-01-21
3	Hwaseong Fortress, Suwon	수원 화성; 水原 華城	Suwon, Gyeonggi	1963-01-21
4	Garimseong Fortress, Buyeo	부여 가림성; 扶餘 加林城	Buyeo County, South Chungcheong	1963-01-21
5	Busosanseong Fortress, Buyeo	부여 부소산성; 扶餘 扶蘇山城	Buyeo County, South Chungcheong	1963-01-21
6	Hwangnyongsa Temple Site, Gyeongju	경주 황룡사지; 慶州 皇龍寺址	Gyeongju, North Gyeongsang	1963-01-21
7	Mangdeoksa Temple Site, Gyeongju	경주 망덕사지; 慶州 望德寺址	Gyeongju, North Gyeongsang	1963-01-21
8	Sacheonwangsa Temple Site, Gyeongju	경주 사천왕사지; 慶州 四天王寺址	Gyeongju, North Gyeongsang	1963-01-21
10	Hanyangdoseong, the Seoul City Wall	서울 한양도성; 서울 漢陽都城	Jongno District, Seoul	1963-01-21
11	Earthen Fortification in Pungnap-dong, Seoul	서울 풍납동 토성; 서울 風納洞 土城	Songpa District, Seoul	1963-01-21
12	Gongsanseong Fortress, Gongju	공주 공산성; 公州 公山城	Gongju, South Chungcheong	1963-01-21
13	Tomb of King Muryeong and Royal Tombs, Gongju	공주 무령왕릉과 왕릉원; 公州 武寧王陵과 王陵園	Gongju, South Chungcheong	1963-01-21
14	Buyeo Royal Tombs	부여 왕릉원; 扶餘 王陵園	Buyeo County, South Chungcheong	1963-01-21
15	Heungnyunsa Temple Site, Gyeongju	경주 흥륜사지; 慶州 興輪寺址	Gyeongju, North Gyeongsang	1963-01-21
16	Wolseong Palace Site, Gyeongju	경주 월성; 慶州 月城	Gyeongju, North Gyeongsang	1963-01-21
17	Namgoru Embankment, Gyeongju	경주 남고루; 慶州 南古壘	Gyeongju, North Gyeongsang	1963-01-21
18	Donggung Palace and Wolji Pond, Gyeongju	경주 동궁과 월지; 慶州 東宮과 月池	Gyeongju, North Gyeongsang	1963-01-21
19	Gyerim Forest, Gyeongju	경주 계림; 慶州 鷄林	Gyeongju, North Gyeongsang	1963-01-21
20	Tomb of King Muyeol, Gyeongju	경주 무열왕릉; 慶州 武烈王陵	Gyeongju, North Gyeongsang	1963-01-21
21	Tomb of Kim Yu-sin, Gyeongju	경주 김유신묘; 慶州 金庾信墓	Gyeongju, North Gyeongsang	1963-01-21
22	Namsansinseong Fortress, Gyeongju	경주 남산신성; 慶州 南山新城	Gyeongju, North Gyeongsang	1963-01-21
23	Tomb of King Gyeongdeok, Gyeongju	경주 경덕왕릉; 慶州 景德王陵	Gyeongju, North Gyeongsang	1963-01-21
24	Tomb of Queen Jindeok, Gyeongju	경주 진덕여왕릉; 慶州 眞德女王陵	Gyeongju, North Gyeongsang	1963-01-21
25	Busanseong Fortress, Gyeongju	경주 부산성; 慶州 富山城	Gyeongju, North Gyeongsang	1963-01-21
26	Tomb of King Wonseong, Gyeongju	경주 원성왕릉; 慶州 元聖王陵	Gyeongju, North Gyeongsang	1963-01-21
27	Square Tomb in Gujeong-dong, Gyeongju	경주 구정동 방형분; 慶州 九政洞 方形墳	Gyeongju, North Gyeongsang	1963-01-21
28	Tomb of King Seongdeok, Gyeongju	경주 성덕왕릉; 慶州 聖德王陵	Gyeongju, North Gyeongsang	1963-01-21
29	Tomb of King Heondeok, Gyeongju	경주 헌덕왕릉; 慶州 憲德王陵	Gyeongju, North Gyeongsang	1963-01-21
30	Tomb of King Heungdeok, Gyeongju	경주 흥덕왕릉; 慶州 興德王陵	Gyeongju, North Gyeongsang	1963-01-21
31	Gameunsa Temple Site, Gyeongju	경주 감은사지; 慶州 感恩寺址	Gyeongju, North Gyeongsang	1963-01-21
32	Dongnimmun Arch, Seoul	서울 독립문; 서울 獨立門	Seodaemun District, Seoul	1963-01-21
33	Plinths of Yeongeunmun Gate, Seoul	서울 영은문 주초; 서울 迎恩門 柱礎	Seodaemun District, Seoul	1963-01-21
34	Cheongmasanseong Fortress, Buyeo	부여 청마산성; 扶餘 靑馬山城	Buyeo County, South Chungcheong	1963-01-21
37	Odaesansago National History Archives, Pyeongchang	평창 오대산사고; 平昌 五臺山史庫	Pyeongchang County, Gangwon	1963-01-21
43	Ancient Tombs in Geumcheok-ri, Gyeongju	경주 금척리 고분군; 慶州 金尺里 古墳群	Gyeongju, North Gyeongsang	1963-01-21
44	Temple Site in Gunsu-ri, Buyeo	부여 군수리 사지; 扶餘 軍守里 寺址	Buyeo County, South Chungcheong	1963-01-21
45	Temple Site in Janghang-ri, Gyeongju	경주 장항리 사지; 慶州 獐項里 寺址	Gyeongju, North Gyeongsang	1963-01-21
46	Wonwonsa Temple Site, Gyeongju	경주 원원사지; 慶州 遠願寺址	Gyeongju, North Gyeongsang	1963-01-21
47	Myeonghwalseong Fortress, Gyeongju	경주 명활성; 慶州 明活城	Gyeongju, North Gyeongsang	1963-01-21
48	Gwanmunseong Fortress	관문성; 關門城	Gyeongju, North Gyeongsang	1963-01-21
55	Sosuseowon Confucian Academy, Yeongju	영주 소수서원; 榮州 紹修書院	Yeongju, North Gyeongsang	1963-01-21
56	Haengjusanseong Fortress, Goyang	고양 행주산성; 高陽 幸州山城	Goyang, Gyeonggi	1963-01-21
57	Namhansanseong Fortress	남한산성; 南漢山城	Gwangju, Gyeonggi	1963-01-21
58	Outer City Wall, Buyeo	부여 나성; 扶餘 羅城	Buyeo County, South Chungcheong	1963-01-21
59	Cheongsanseong Fortress, Buyeo	부여 청산성; 扶餘 靑山城	Buyeo County, South Chungcheong	1963-01-21
60	Geonjisanseong Fortress, Seocheon	서천 건지산성; 舒川 乾芝山城	Seocheon County, South Chungcheong	1963-01-21
61	Jusanseong Fortress, Goryeong	고령 주산성; 高靈 主山城	Goryeong County, North Gyeongsang	1963-01-21
62	Dalseong Fortress, Daegu	대구 달성; 大邱 達城	Jung District, Daegu	1963-01-21
64	Hwawangsanseong Fortress, Changnyeong	창녕 화왕산성; 昌寧 火旺山城	Changnyeong County, South Gyeongsang	1963-01-21
65	Mongmasanseong Fortress, Changnyeong	창녕 목마산성; 昌寧 牧馬山城	Changnyeong County, South Gyeongsang	1963-01-21
66	Bunsanseong Fortress, Gimhae	김해 분산성; 金海 盆山城	Gimhae, South Gyeongsang	1963-01-21
67	Seongsansanseong Fortress, Haman	함안 성산산성; 咸安 城山山城	Haman County, South Gyeongsang	1963-01-21
68	Goryeo Celadon Kiln Site, Gangjin	강진 고려청자 요지; 康津 高麗靑瓷 窯址	Gangjin County, South Jeolla	1963-01-21
69	Kiln Site in Yucheon-ri, Buan	부안 유천리 요지; 扶安 柳川里 窯址	Buan County, North Jeolla	1963-01-21
70	Kiln Site in Jinseo-ri, Buan	부안 진서리 요지; 扶安 鎭西里 窯址	Buan County, North Jeolla	1963-01-21
73	Tomb of King Suro, Gimhae	김해 수로왕릉; 金海 首露王陵	Gimhae, South Gyeongsang	1963-01-21
74	Tomb of Queen Consort of King Suro, Gimhae	김해 수로왕비릉; 金海 首露王妃陵	Gimhae, South Gyeongsang	1963-01-21
75	Ancient Tombs in Gusan-dong, Gimhae	김해 구산동 고분군; 金海 龜山洞 古墳群	Gimhae, South Gyeongsang	1963-01-21
79	Ancient Tombs in Jisan-dong, Goryeong	고령 지산동 고분군; 高靈 池山洞 古墳群	Goryeong County, North Gyeongsang	1963-01-21
82	Temple Site in Cheongun-dong, Gyeongju	경주 천군동 사지; 慶州 千軍洞 寺址	Gyeongju, North Gyeongsang	1963-01-21
83	Seonjamdan Altar Site, Seoul	서울 선잠단지; 서울 先蠶壇址	Seongbuk District, Seoul	1963-01-21
86	Ancient Tombs in Seongsan-dong, Seongju	성주 성산동 고분군; 星州 星山洞 古墳群	Seongju County, North Gyeongsang	1963-01-21
87	Twin Tombs, Iksan	익산 쌍릉; 益山 雙陵	Iksan, North Jeolla	1963-01-21
88	Mansion Site in Seongdong-dong, Gyeongju	경주 성동동 전랑지; 慶州 城東洞 殿廊址	Gyeongju, North Gyeongsang	1963-01-21
89	Seokseongsanseong Fortress, Buyeo	부여 석성산성; 扶餘 石城山城	Buyeo County, South Chungcheong	1963-01-21
90	Imjonseong Fortress, Yesan	예산 임존성; 禮山 任存城	Yesan County, South Chungcheong	1963-01-21
92	Earthen Fortification, Iksan	익산 토성; 益山 土城	Iksan, North Jeolla	1963-01-21
93	Ancient Tombs in Bukjeong-ri, Yangsan	양산 북정리 고분군; 梁山 北亭里 古墳群	Yangsan, South Gyeongsang	1963-01-21
94	Ancient Tombs in Singi-ri, Yangsan	양산 신기리 고분군; 梁山 新基里 古墳群	Yangsan, South Gyeongsang	1963-01-21
95	Ancient Tombs in Jungbu-dong, Yangsan	양산 중부동 고분군; 梁山 中部洞 古墳群	Yangsan, South Gyeongsang	1963-01-21
96	Gyeongjueupseong Walled Town	경주읍성; 慶州邑城	Gyeongju, North Gyeongsang	1963-01-21
97	Fortress in Singi-ri, Yangsan	양산 신기리 산성; 梁山 新基里 山城	Yangsan, South Gyeongsang	1963-01-21
98	Fortress in Bukbu-dong, Yangsan	양산 북부동 산성; 梁山 北部洞 山城	Yangsan, South Gyeongsang	1963-01-21
99	Kiln Site in Ssangbuk-ri, Buyeo	부여 쌍북리 요지; 扶餘 雙北里 窯址	Buyeo County, South Chungcheong	1963-01-21
100	Kiln Site in Beopgi-ri, Yangsan	양산 법기리 요지; 梁山 法基里 窯址	Yangsan, South Gyeongsang	1963-01-21

=== Designation number from 101 – 200 ===
No	Official name in English	Official name in Korean	Location	Date of designation
100	Samjeondobi Monument, Seoul	서울 삼전도비; 서울 三田渡碑	Songpa District, Seoul	1963-01-21
103	Dolmens in Guam-ri, Buan	부안 구암리 지석묘군; 扶安 龜岩里 支石墓群	Buan County, North Jeolla	1963-01-21
104	Site of the Stele for the Victory at Hwangsan Battle, Namwon	남원 황산대첩비지; 南原 荒山大捷碑址	Namwon, North Jeolla	1963-01-21
105	Tomb of Seven Hundred Patriotic Martyrs, Geumsan	금산 칠백의총; 錦山 七百義塚	Geumsan County, South Chungcheong	1963-01-21
106	Tombs of Seven Patriotic Martyrs in Seokjugwan Fortress, Gurye	구례 석주관 칠의사묘; 求禮 石柱關 七義士墓	Gurye County, South Jeolla	1963-01-21
107	Historic Site Related to Jeong Yak-yong, Gangjin	강진 정약용 유적; 康津 丁若鏞 遺蹟	Gangjin County, South Jeolla	1963-01-21
108	The First Cotton Farm Site, Sancheong	산청 목면시배 유지; 山淸 木棉始培 遺址	Sancheong County, South Gyeongsang	1963-01-21
109	House of the Maeng Clan, Asan	아산 맹씨 행단; 牙山 孟氏 杏壇	Asan, South Chungcheong	1963-01-21
111	Byeokgolje Reservoir, Gimje	김제 벽골제; 金堤 碧骨堤	Gimje, North Jeolla	1963-01-21
112	Tomb of Yi Sun-sin, Asan	아산 이충무공묘; 牙山 李忠武公墓	Asan, South Chungcheong	1963-01-21
113	Historic Site Related to Yi Sun-sin on Hansando Island, Tongyeong	통영 한산도 이충무공 유적; 統營 閑山島 李忠武公 遺蹟	Tongyeong, South Gyeongsang	1963-01-21
114	Historic Site Related to Yi Sun-sin on Myodangdo Island, Wando	완도 묘당도 이충무공 유적; 莞島 廟堂島 李忠武公 遺蹟	Wando County, South Jeolla	1963-01-21
115	Hwaryeongjeon Shrine, Suwon	수원 화령전; 水原 華寧殿	Suwon, Gyeonggi	1963-01-21
116	Haemieupseong Walled Town, Seosan	서산 해미읍성; 瑞山 海美邑城	Seosan, South Chungcheong	1963-01-21
117	Gyeongbokgung Palace	경복궁; 景福宮	Jongno District, Seoul	1963-01-21
118	Jinjuseong Fortress	진주성; 晋州城	Jinju, South Gyeongsang	1963-01-21
119	Ancient Tombs in Songhak-dong, Goseong	고성 송학동 고분군; 固城 松鶴洞 古墳群	Goseong County, South Gyeongsang	1963-01-21
120	Ancient Tombs in Naesan-ri, Goseong	고성 내산리 고분군; 固城 內山里 古墳群	Goseong County, South Gyeongsang	1963-01-21
121	Sajikdan Altar	사직단; 社稷壇	Jongno District, Seoul	1963-01-21
122	Changdeokgung Palace Complex	창덕궁; 昌德宮	Jongno District, Seoul	1963-01-18
123	Changgyeonggung Palace	창경궁; 昌慶宮	Jongno District, Seoul	1963-01-18
124	Deoksugung Palace	덕수궁; 德壽宮	Jung District, Seoul	1963-01-18
125	Jongmyo Shrine	종묘; 宗廟	Jongno District, Seoul	1963-01-18
126	Yongjangseong Fortress, Jindo	진도 용장성; 珍島 龍藏城	Jindo County, South Jeolla	1964-06-10
127	Namdojinseong Fortress, Jindo	진도 남도진성; 珍島 南桃鎭城	Jindo County, South Jeolla	1964-06-10
128	Hoeamsa Temple Site, Yangju	양주 회암사지; 楊州 檜巖寺址	Yangju, Gyeonggi	1964-06-10
129	Kiln Site in Cheonhwangsan Mountain, Ulju	울주 천황산 요지; 蔚州 天皇山 窯址	Ulju County, Ulsan	1964-06-10
130	Samnangseong Fortress, Ganghwa	강화 삼랑성; 江華 三郞城	Ganghwa County, Incheon	1964-06-10
131	Yeongamsa Temple Site, Hapcheon	합천 영암사지; 陜川 靈岩寺址	Hapcheon County, South Gyeongsang	1964-06-10
132	Ganghwasanseong Fortress	강화산성; 江華山城	Ganghwa County, Incheon	1964-06-10
133	Goryeo Palace Site, Ganghwa	강화 고려궁지; 江華 高麗宮址	Ganghwa County, Incheon	1964-06-10
134	Samseonghyeol Shrine, Jeju	제주 삼성혈; 濟州 三姓穴	Jeju City, Jeju	1964-06-10
135	Gungnamji Pond, Buyeo	부여 궁남지; 扶餘 宮南池	Buyeo County, South Chungcheong	1964-06-10
136	Chamseongdan Altar, Ganghwa	강화 참성단; 江華 塹星壇	Ganghwa County, Incheon	1964-07-11
137	Dolmen in Bugeun-ri, Ganghwa	강화 부근리 지석묘; 江華 富近里 支石墓	Ganghwa County, Incheon	1964-07-11
138	Seochulji Pond, Gyeongju	경주 서출지; 慶州 書出池	Gyeongju, North Gyeongsang	1964-07-11
139	Munsusanseong Fortress, Gimpo	김포 문수산성; 金浦 文殊山城	Gimpo, Gyeonggi	1964-08-29
140	Doksanseong Fortress and Semadae Site, Osan	오산 독산성과 세마대지; 烏山 禿山城과 洗馬臺址	Osan, Gyeonggi	1964-08-29
141	Kiln Site in Chunghyo-dong, Gwangju	광주 충효동 요지; 光州 忠孝洞 窯址	Buk District, Gwangju	1964-08-29
142	Ancient Tombs in Seoak-dong, Gyeongju	경주 서악동 고분군; 慶州 西岳洞 古墳群	Gyeongju, North Gyeongsang	1964-08-29
143	Munmyo Confucian Shrine and Seonggyungwan National Academy, Seoul	서울 문묘와 성균관; 서울 文廟와 成均館	Jongno District, Seoul	1964-11-10
144	Byeokjegwan Guesthouse Site, Goyang	고양 벽제관지; 高陽 碧蹄館址	Goyang, Gyeonggi	1965-02-02
145	Gochangeupseong Walled Town	고창읍성; 高敞邑城	Gochang County, North Jeolla	1965-04-01
146	Jeoksangsanseong Fortress, Muju	무주 적상산성; 茂朱 赤裳山城	Muju County, North Jeolla	1965-07-10
147	Gates of Joryeong Path, Mungyeong	문경 조령 관문; 聞慶 鳥嶺 關門	Mungyeong, North Gyeongsang	1966-03-22
148	Dwelling Site and Dolmens in Deogeun-ri, Paju	파주 덕은리 주거지와 지석묘군; 坡州 德隱里 住居址와 支石墓群	Paju, Gyeonggi	1966-03-22
149	Yuksanggung Shrine, Seoul	서울 육상궁; 서울 毓祥宮	Jongno District, Seoul	1966-03-22
150	Mireuksa Temple Site, Iksan	익산 미륵사지; 益山 彌勒寺址	Iksan, North Jeolla	1966-06-22
151	Gososeong Fortress, Hadong	하동 고소성; 河東 姑蘇城	Hadong County, South Gyeongsang	1966-09-06
152	Sageunsanseong Fortress, Hamyang	함양 사근산성; 咸陽 沙斤山城	Hamyang County, South Gyeongsang	1966-09-10
153	Eonyangeupseong Walled Town, Ulju	울주 언양읍성; 蔚州 彦陽邑城	Ulju County, Ulsan	1966-12-27
154	Oksanseowon Confucian Academy, Gyeongju	경주 옥산서원; 慶州 玉山書院	Gyeongju, North Gyeongsang	1967-03-08
155	Historic Site Related to Yi Sun-sin, Asan	아산 이충무공 유허; 牙山 李忠武公 遺墟	Asan, South Chungcheong	1967-03-18
156	Jeungsanseong Fortress, Buyeo	부여 증산성; 扶餘 甑山城	Buyeo County, South Chungcheong	1967-03-25
157	Hwangudan Altar	환구단; 圜丘壇	Jung District, Seoul	1967-07-15
158	Tomb of King Munmu, Gyeongju	경주 문무대왕릉; 慶州 文武大王陵	Gyeongju, North Gyeongsang	1967-07-24
159	Igyeondae Pavilion, Gyeongju	경주 이견대; 慶州 利見臺	Gyeongju, North Gyeongsang	1967-08-01
161	Archaeological Area in Eastern Gyeongju	경주 동부 사적지대; 慶州 東部 史蹟地帶	Gyeongju, North Gyeongsang	1968-07-24
162	Bukhansanseong Fortress	북한산성; 北漢山城	Goyang, Gyeonggi	1968-12-05
163	Archaeological Area of Nangsan Mountain, Gyeongju	경주 낭산 일원; 慶州 狼山 一圓	Gyeongju, North Gyeongsang	1968-12-13
164	Ancient Tombs in Pyeonggeo-dong, Jinju	진주 평거동 고분군; 晋州 平居洞 古墳群	Jinju, South Gyeongsang	1968-12-19
165	Mural Tomb in Goa-ri, Goryeong	고령 고아리 벽화 고분; 高靈 古衙里 壁畵 古墳	Goryeong County, North Gyeongsang	1968-12-19
166	Museongseowon Confucian Academy, Jeongeup	정읍 무성서원; 井邑 武城書院	Jeongeup, North Jeolla	1968-12-19
167	Nogudang House of the Haenam Yun Clan and Surroundings	해남윤씨 녹우당 일원; 海南尹氏 綠雨堂 一圓	Haenam County, South Jeolla	1968-12-19
168	Geodonsa Temple Site, Wonju	원주 거돈사지; 原州 居頓寺址	Wonju, Gangwon	1968-12-19
170	Dosanseowon Confucian Academy, Andong	안동 도산서원; 安東 陶山書院	Andong, North Gyeongsang	1969-05-31
171	Monument for the 40th Anniversary of King Gojong's Enthronement, Seoul	서울 고종 어극 40년 칭경기념비; 서울 高宗 御極 四十年 稱慶紀念碑	Jongno District, Seoul	1969-07-18
172	Five Royal Tombs, Gyeongju	경주 오릉; 慶州 五陵	Gyeongju, North Gyeongsang	1969-08-27
173	Tomb of King Ilseong, Gyeongju	경주 일성왕릉; 慶州 逸聖王陵	Gyeongju, North Gyeongsang	1969-08-27
174	Tomb of King Talhae, Gyeongju	경주 탈해왕릉; 慶州 脫海王陵	Gyeongju, North Gyeongsang	1969-08-27
175	Tomb of King Michu, Gyeongju	경주 미추왕릉; 慶州 味鄒王陵	Gyeongju, North Gyeongsang	1969-08-27
176	Tomb of King Beopheung, Gyeongju	경주 법흥왕릉; 慶州 法興王陵	Gyeongju, North Gyeongsang	1969-08-27
177	Tomb of King Jinheung, Gyeongju	경주 진흥왕릉; 慶州 眞興王陵	Gyeongju, North Gyeongsang	1969-08-27
179	Tomb of King Heonan, Gyeongju	경주 헌안왕릉; 慶州 憲安王陵	Gyeongju, North Gyeongsang	1969-08-27
180	Tomb of King Jinpyeong, Gyeongju	경주 진평왕릉; 慶州 眞平王陵	Gyeongju, North Gyeongsang	1969-08-27
181	Tomb of King Sinmun, Gyeongju	경주 신문왕릉; 慶州 神文王陵	Gyeongju, North Gyeongsang	1969-08-27
182	Tomb of Queen Seondeok, Gyeongju	경주 선덕여왕릉; 慶州 善德女王陵	Gyeongju, North Gyeongsang	1969-08-27
183	Tomb of King Hyogong, Gyeongju	경주 효공왕릉; 慶州 孝恭王陵	Gyeongju, North Gyeongsang	1969-08-27
184	Tomb of King Hyoso, Gyeongju	경주 효소왕릉; 慶州 孝昭王陵	Gyeongju, North Gyeongsang	1969-08-27
185	Tomb of King Sinmu, Gyeongju	경주 신무왕릉; 慶州 神武王陵	Gyeongju, North Gyeongsang	1969-08-27
186	Tomb of King Jeonggang, Gyeongju	경주 정강왕릉; 慶州 定康王陵	Gyeongju, North Gyeongsang	1969-08-27
187	Tomb of King Heongang, Gyeongju	경주 헌강왕릉; 慶州 憲康王陵	Gyeongju, North Gyeongsang	1969-08-27
188	Tomb of King Naemul, Gyeongju	경주 내물왕릉; 慶州 奈勿王陵	Gyeongju, North Gyeongsang	1969-08-27
189	Chungnyeolsa Shrine for Im Gyeong-eop, Chungju	충주 임충민공 충렬사; 忠州 林忠愍公 忠烈祠	Chungju, North Chungcheong	1969-11-24
190	Tomb of King Minae, Gyeongju (Presumed)	경주 전 민애왕릉; 慶州 傳 閔哀王陵	Gyeongju, North Gyeongsang	1970-02-06
191	Tomb of King Gongyang, Goyang	고양 공양왕릉; 高陽 恭讓王陵	Goyang, Gyeonggi	1970-02-28
192	Shell Mound in Dongnae, Busan	부산 동래 패총; 釜山 東萊 貝塚	Dongnae District, Busan	1970-05-01
193	East Nine Royal Tombs, Guri	구리 동구릉; 九里 東九陵	Guri, Gyeonggi	1970-05-26
194	Heolleung and Illeung Royal Tombs, Seoul	서울 헌릉과 인릉; 서울 獻陵과 仁陵	Seocho District, Seoul	1970-05-26
195	Yeongneung and Nyeongneung Royal Tombs, Yeoju	여주 영릉과 영릉; 驪州 英陵과 寧陵	Yeoju, Gyeonggi	1970-05-27
196	Jangneung Royal Tomb, Yeongwol	영월 장릉; 寧越 莊陵	Yeongwol County, Gangwon	1970-05-27
197	Gwangneung Royal Tomb, Namyangju	남양주 광릉; 南楊州 光陵	Namyangju, Gyeonggi	1970-05-26
198	West Five Royal Tombs, Goyang	고양 서오릉; 高陽 西五陵	Goyang, Gyeonggi	1970-05-26
199	Seolleung and Jeongneung Royal Tombs, Seoul	서울 선릉과 정릉; 서울 宣陵과 靖陵	Gangnam District, Seoul	1970-05-26
200	West Three Royal Tombs, Goyang	고양 서삼릉; 高陽 西三陵	Goyang, Gyeonggi	1970-05-26

=== Designation number from 201 – 300 ===
No	Official name in English	Official name in Korean	Location	Date of designation
201	Taereung and Gangneung Royal Tombs, Seoul	서울 태릉과 강릉; 서울 泰陵과 康陵	Nowon District, Seoul	1970-05-26
202	Jangneung Royal Tomb, Gimpo	김포 장릉; 金浦 章陵	Gimpo, Gyeonggi	1970-05-26
203	Jangneung Royal Tomb, Paju	파주 장릉; 坡州 長陵	Paju, Gyeonggi	1970-05-26
204	Uireung Royal Tomb, Seoul	서울 의릉; 서울 懿陵	Seongbuk District, Seoul	1970-05-26
205	Three Royal Tombs, Paju	파주 삼릉; 坡州 三陵	Paju, Gyeonggi	1970-05-26
206	Yungneung and Geolleung Royal Tombs, Hwaseong	화성 융릉과 건릉; 華城 隆陵과 健陵	Hwaseong, Gyeonggi	1970-05-26
207	Hongneung and Yureung Royal Tombs, Namyangju	남양주 홍릉과 유릉; 南楊州 洪陵과 裕陵	Namyangju, Gyeonggi	1970-05-26
208	Jeongneung Royal Tomb, Seoul	서울 정릉; 서울 貞陵	Seongbuk District, Seoul	1970-05-26
209	Sareung Royal Tomb, Namyangju	남양주 사릉; 南楊州 思陵	Namyangju, Gyeonggi	1970-05-26
210	Olleung Royal Tomb, Yangju	양주 온릉; 楊州 溫陵	Yangju, Gyeonggi	1970-05-26
211	Green Celadon Kiln Site in Gyeongseo-dong, Incheon	인천 경서동 녹청자 요지; 仁川 景西洞 綠靑瓷 窯址	Seo District, Incheon	1970-06-08
212	Sangdangsanseong Fortress, Cheongju	청주 상당산성; 淸州 上黨山城	Cheongju, North Chungcheong	1970-10-01
213	Central Post Office, Seoul	서울 우정총국; 서울 郵征總局	Jongno District, Seoul	1970-10-29
214	Tomb of King Guhyeong, Sancheong (Presumed)	산청 전 구형왕릉; 山淸 傳 仇衡王陵	Sancheong County, South Gyeongsang	1971-02-09
215	Geumjeongsanseong Fortress	금정산성; 金井山城	Geumjeong District, Busan	1971-02-09
216	Gasansanseong Fortress, Chilgok	칠곡 가산산성; 漆谷 架山山城	Chilgok County, North Gyeongsang	1971-03-26
217	Dangseong Fortress, Hwaseong	화성 당성; 華城 唐城	Hwaseong, Gyeonggi	1971-04-15
218	Historic Site of Barracks, Gyeongsan	경산 병영유적; 慶山 兵營遺蹟	Gyeongsan, North Gyeongsang	1971-04-28
219	Three Royal Tombs in Bae-dong, Gyeongju	경주 배동 삼릉; 慶州 拜洞 三陵	Gyeongju, North Gyeongsang	1971-04-28
220	Tomb of King Huigang, Gyeongju	경주 희강왕릉; 慶州 僖康王陵	Gyeongju, North Gyeongsang	1971-04-28
221	Tomb of King Jima, Gyeongju	경주 지마왕릉; 慶州 祗摩王陵	Gyeongju, North Gyeongsang	1971-04-28
222	Tomb of King Gyeongae, Gyeongju	경주 경애왕릉; 慶州 景哀王陵	Gyeongju, North Gyeongsang	1971-04-28
223	Sunguijeon Shrine Site, Yeoncheon	연천 숭의전지; 漣川 崇義殿址	Yeoncheon County, Gyeonggi	1971-12-29
224	Hongneung Royal Tomb, Ganghwa	강화 홍릉; 江華 洪陵	Ganghwa County, Incheon	1971-12-29
225	Chojijin Fort, Ganghwa	강화 초지진; 江華 草芝鎭	Ganghwa County, Incheon	1971-12-29
226	Deokjinjin Fort, Ganghwa	강화 덕진진; 江華 德津鎭	Ganghwa County, Incheon	1971-12-29
227	Gwangseongbo Fort, Ganghwa	강화 광성보; 江華 廣城堡	Ganghwa County, Incheon	1971-12-29
228	Site of the Monument on Bukhansan Mountain Commemorating the Border Inspection by King Jinheung	북한산 진흥왕 순수비지; 北汉山新罗真兴王巡守碑遗址	Jongno District, Seoul	1972-07-24
229	Historic Site Related to Yun Bong-gil, Yesan	예산 윤봉길 의사 유적; 禮山 尹奉吉 義士 遺蹟	Yesan County, South Chungcheong	1972-10-14
230	Historic Site Related to Yu Gwan-sun, Cheonan	천안 유관순 열사 유적; 天安 柳寬順 烈士 遺蹟	Cheonan, South Chungcheong	1972-10-14
231	Hongjueupseong Walled Town, Hongseong	홍성 홍주읍성; 洪城 洪州邑城	Hongseong County, South Chungcheong	1972-10-14
232	Historic Site Related to Yi Sun-sin at Gwaneumpo Port, Namhae	남해 관음포 이충무공 유적; 南海 觀音浦 李忠武公 遺蹟	Namhae County, South Gyeongsang	1973-06-11
233	Chungnyeolsa Shrine, Namhae	남해 충렬사; 南海 忠烈祠	Namhae County, South Gyeongsang	1973-06-11
234	Achasanseong Fortress	아차산성; 阿且山城	Gwangjin District, Seoul	1973-05-25
235	Samnyeonsanseong Fortress, Boeun	보은 삼년산성; 報恩 三年山城	Boeun County, North Chungcheong	1973-05-25
236	Chungnyeolsa Shrine, Tongyeong	통영 충렬사; 統營 忠烈祠	Tongyeong, South Gyeongsang	1973-06-11
237	Gyeongmogung Shrine Site, Seoul	서울 경모궁지; 서울 景慕宮址	Jongno District, Seoul	1973-08-14
238	Tomb of Eo Suk in Sunheung, Yeongju	영주 순흥 어숙묘; 榮州 順興 於宿墓	Yeongju, North Gyeongsang	1974-12-06
239	Mural Tomb in Dunma-ri, Geochang	거창 둔마리 벽화 고분; 居昌 屯馬里 壁畵 古墳	Geochang County, South Gyeongsang	1974-09-05
240	Shell Mound in Seongsan, Changwon	창원 성산 패총; 昌原 城山 貝塚	Changwon, South Gyeongsang	1974-11-02
241	Ash-glazed Pottery Kiln Site in Hwasan-ri, Gyeongju	경주 화산리 회유토기 요지; 慶州 花山里 灰釉土器 窯址	Gyeongju, North Gyeongsang	1974-12-14
242	Piramseowon Confucian Academy, Jangseong	장성 필암서원; 長城 筆巖書院	Jangseong County, South Jeolla	1975-04-23
243	Ancient Tombs in Seokchon-dong, Seoul	서울 석촌동 고분군; 서울 石村洞 古墳群	Songpa District, Seoul	1975-05-27
244	Tomb of King Gyeongsun, Yeoncheon	연천 경순왕릉; 漣川 敬順王陵	Yeoncheon County, Gyeonggi	1975-06-25
245	Najeong Well, Gyeongju	경주 나정; 慶州 蘿井	Gyeongju, North Gyeongsang	1975-11-20
246	Jaemaejeong Well, Gyeongju	경주 재매정; 慶州 財買井	Gyeongju, North Gyeongsang	1976-01-07
247	Kiln Site in Namhyeon-dong, Seoul	서울 남현동 요지; 서울 南峴洞 窯址	Gwanak District, Seoul	1976-04-10
248	Daehan Hospital, Seoul	서울 대한의원; 서울 大韓醫院	Jongno District, Seoul	1976-11-16
249	Archaeological Site in Songguk-ri, Buyeo	부여 송국리 유적; 扶餘 松菊里 遺蹟	Buyeo County, South Chungcheong	1976-12-31
250	Buncheong Kiln Site, Gochang	고창 분청사기 요지; 高敞 粉靑砂器 窯址	Gochang County, North Jeolla	1977-01-22
251	Pasaseong Fortress, Yeoju	여주 파사성; 驪州 婆娑城	Yeoju, Gyeonggi	1977-07-21
252	Yakhyeon Catholic Church, Seoul	서울 약현성당; 서울 藥峴聖堂	Jung District, Seoul	1977-11-22
253	Former Russian Legation, Seoul	서울 구 러시아공사관; 서울 舊 러시아公使館	Jung District, Seoul	1977-11-22
254	Former Belgian Consulate, Seoul	서울 구 벨기에영사관; 서울 舊 벨기에領事館	Gwanak District, Seoul	1977-11-22
256	Chungdong First Methodist Church, Seoul	서울 정동교회; 서울 貞洞敎會	Jung District, Seoul	1977-11-22
257	Unhyeongung Palace, Seoul	서울 운현궁; 서울 雲峴宮	Jongno District, Seoul	1977-11-22
258	Myeongdong Cathedral, Seoul	서울 명동성당; 서울 明洞聖堂	Jung District, Seoul	1977-11-22
259	Seonwonsa Temple Site, Ganghwa	강화 선원사지; 江華 仙源寺址	Ganghwa County, Incheon	1977-11-29
260	Byeongsanseowon Confucian Academy, Andong	안동 병산서원; 安東 屛山書院	Andong, North Gyeongsang	1978-03-31
261	Ancient Tombs in Yean-ri, Gimhae	김해 예안리 고분군; 金海 禮安里 古墳群	Gimhae, South Gyeongsang	1978-06-23
262	Ancient Tombs in Bullo-dong, Daegu	대구 불로동 고분군; 大邱 不老洞 古墳群	Dong District, Daegu	1978-06-23
263	Roof Tile Kiln Site in Dongbang-dong, Gyeongju	경주 동방동 와요지; 慶州 東方洞 瓦窯址	Gyeongju, North Gyeongsang	1978-06-23
264	Ondalsanseong Fortress, Danyang	단양 온달산성; 丹陽 溫達山城	Danyang County, North Chungcheong	1979-07-26
265	Jeokseong Fortress, Danyang	단양 적성; 丹陽 赤城	Danyang County, North Chungcheong	1979-07-26
266	Shell Mound in Dongsam-dong, Busan	부산 동삼동 패총; 釜山 東三洞 貝塚	Yeongdo District, Busan	1979-07-26
267	Archaeological Site in Amsa-dong, Seoul	서울 암사동 유적; 서울 岩寺洞 遺蹟	Gangdong District, Seoul	1979-07-26
268	Archaeological Site in Jeongok-ri, Yeoncheon	연천 전곡리 유적; 漣川 全谷里 遺蹟	Yeoncheon County, Gyeonggi	1979-10-02
269	Archaeological Site in Misa-ri, Hanam	하남 미사리 유적; 河南 渼沙里 遺蹟	Hanam, Gyeonggi	1979-10-25
270	Ancient Tombs in Bangi-dong, Seoul	서울 방이동 고분군; 서울 芳荑洞 古墳群	Songpa District, Seoul	1979-12-28
271	Gyeonghuigung Palace Site	경희궁지; 慶熙宮址	Jongno District, Seoul	1980-09-16
272	Tomb of Ten Thousand Patriotic Martyrs, Namwon	남원 만인의총; 南原 萬人義塚	Namwon, North Jeolla	1981-04-01
273	Ancient Tombs in Bokcheon-dong, Busan	부산 복천동 고분군; 釜山 福泉洞 古墳群	Dongnae District, Busan	1981-06-09
274	Sea Area with Sunken Relics, Sinan	신안 해저유물 매장해역; 新安 海底遺物 埋藏海域	Sinan County, South Jeolla	1981-06-16
275	Stimson Hall of Yonsei University, Seoul	서울 연세대학교 스팀슨관; 서울 延世大學校 스팀슨館	Seodaemun District, Seoul	1981-09-25
276	Underwood Hall of Yonsei University, Seoul	서울 연세대학교 언더우드관; 서울 延世大學校 언더우드館	Seodaemun District, Seoul	1981-09-25
277	Appenzeller Hall of Yonsei University, Seoul	서울 연세대학교 아펜젤러관; 서울 延世大學校 아펜젤러館	Seodaemun District, Seoul	1981-09-25
278	Former Main Building of Seoul National University	구 서울대학교 본관; 舊 서울大學校 本館	Jongno District, Seoul	1981-09-25
279	Main Building of Former National Industrial Institute	구 공업전습소 본관; 舊 工業傳習所 本館	Jongno District, Seoul	1981-09-25
280	Main Building of the Bank of Korea, Seoul	서울 한국은행 본관; 서울 韓國銀行 本館	Jung District, Seoul	1981-09-25
281	Main Building of Choong Ang High School, Seoul	서울 중앙고등학교 본관; 서울 中央高等學校 本館	Jongno District, Seoul	1981-09-25
282	West Building of Choong Ang High School, Seoul	서울 중앙고등학교 서관; 서울 中央高等學校 西館	Jongno District, Seoul	1981-09-25
283	East Building of Choong Ang High School, Seoul	서울 중앙고등학교 동관; 서울 中央高等學校 東館	Jongno District, Seoul	1981-09-25
284	Former Seoul Station Building	구 서울역사; 舊 서울驛舍	Jung District, Seoul	1981-09-25
285	Main Building of Korea University, Seoul	서울 고려대학교 본관; 서울 高麗大學校 本館	Seongbuk District, Seoul	1981-09-25
286	Central Library of Korea University, Seoul	서울 고려대학교 중앙도서관; 서울 高麗大學校 中央圖書館	Seongbuk District, Seoul	1981-09-25
287	Dapdong Cathedral, Incheon	인천 답동성당; 仁川 沓洞聖堂	Jung District, Incheon	1981-09-25
288	Jeondong Catholic Cathedral, Jeonju	전주 전동성당; 全州 殿洞聖堂	Jeonju, North Jeolla	1981-09-25
289	Former Japanese Consulate, Mokpo	구 목포 일본영사관; 舊 木浦 日本領事館	Mokpo, South Jeolla	1981-09-25
290	Gyesandong Cathedral, Daegu	대구 계산동성당; 大邱 桂山洞聖堂	Jung District, Daegu	1981-09-25
291	Jinhae Post Office, Changwon	창원 진해우체국; 昌原 鎭海郵遞局	Changwon, South Gyeongsang	1981-09-25
292	Deokpojin Fort, Gimpo	김포 덕포진; 金浦 德浦鎭	Gimpo, Gyeonggi	1981-09-25
293	Historic Site Related to Jeon Bong-jun, Jeongeup	정읍 전봉준 유적; 井邑 全琫準 遺蹟	Jeongeup, North Jeolla	1981-11-28
294	Namgosanseong Fortress, Jeonju	전주 남고산성; 全州 南固山城	Jeonju, North Jeolla	1981-12-10
295	Hwangtohyeon Battlefield, Jeongeup	정읍 황토현 전적; 井邑 黃土峴 戰蹟	Jeongeup, North Jeolla	1981-12-10
297	Mongchontoseong Earthen Fortification, Seoul	서울 몽촌토성; 서울 夢村土城	Songpa District, Seoul	1982-07-22
298	Namwoneupseong Walled Town	남원읍성; 南原邑城	Namwon, North Jeolla	1982-11-03
299	Historic Site of March First Independence Movement in Jeam-ri, Hwaseong	화성 제암리 3·1운동 순국 유적; 華城 堤岩里 3·1運動 殉國 遺蹟	Hwaseong, Gyeonggi	1982-12-21

=== Designation number from 301 – 400 ===
No	Official name in English	Official name in Korean	Location	Date of designation
301	Jeongnimsa Temple Site, Buyeo	부여 정림사지; 扶餘 定林寺址	Buyeo County, South Chungcheong	1983-03-26
302	Naganeupseong Walled Town, Suncheon	순천 낙안읍성; 順天 樂安邑城	Suncheon, South Jeolla	1983-06-14
305	Historic Site Related to Jo Sik, Sancheong	산청 조식 유적; 山淸 曺植 遺蹟	Sancheong County, South Gyeongsang	1984-01-26
306	Gapgotdon Watchtower, Ganghwa	강화 갑곶돈; 江華 甲串墩	Ganghwa County, Incheon	1984-08-13
307	Seongjusa Temple Site, Boryeong	보령 성주사지; 保寧 聖住寺址	Boryeong, South Chungcheong	1984-08-13
308	Historic Site of Cheonghaejin Fort, Wando	완도 청해진 유적; 莞島 淸海鎭 遺蹟	Wando County, South Jeolla	1984-09-01
309	Silsangsa Temple, Namwon	남원 실상사; 南原 實相寺	Namwon, North Jeolla	1984-10-19
310	Celadon Kiln Site in Jinsan-ri, Haenam	해남 진산리 청자 요지; 海南 珍山里 靑磁 窯址	Haenam County, South Jeolla	1985-01-04
311	Archaeological Area of Namsan Mountain, Gyeongju	경주 남산 일원; 慶州 南山 一圓	Gyeongju, North Gyeongsang	1985-02-23
312	Unjusa Temple Site, Hwasun	화순 운주사지; 和順 雲住寺址	Hwasun County, South Jeolla	1985-04-15
313	Mural Tomb in Sunheung, Yeongju	영주 순흥 벽화 고분; 榮州 順興 壁畵 古墳	Yeongju, North Gyeongsang	1985-11-07
314	Joseon White Porcelain Kiln Site, Gwangju	광주 조선백자 요지; 廣州 朝鮮白磁 窯址	Gwangju, Gyeonggi	1985-11-07
315	Heungdeoksa Temple Site, Cheongju	청주 흥덕사지; 淸州 興德寺址	Cheongju, North Chungcheong	1986-05-07
316	Bowonsa Temple Site, Seosan	서산 보원사지; 瑞山 普願寺址	Seosan, South Chungcheong	1987-07-18
317	Mireukdaewon Stone Temple Site, Chungju	충주 미륵대원지; 忠州 彌勒大院址	Chungju, North Chungcheong	1987-07-18
318	Nabawi Shrine, Iksan	익산 나바위성당; 益山 나바위聖堂	Iksan, North Jeolla	1987-07-18
319	Ancient Tombs in Sinbong-dong, Cheongju	청주 신봉동 고분군; 淸州 新鳳洞 古墳群	Cheongju, North Chungcheong	1987-07-18
320	Military Headquarters of Gyeongsangjwa-do Province, Ulsan	울산 경상좌도병영성; 蔚山 慶尙左道兵營城	Jung District, Ulsan	1987-07-18
321	Sea Area with Sunken Relics near Jukdo Island, Boryeong	보령 죽도 해저유물 매장해역; 保寧 竹島 海底遺物 埋藏海域	Boryeong, South Chungcheong	1987-09-18
322	Hwangseoksanseong Fortress, Hamyang	함양 황석산성; 咸陽 黃石山城	Hamyang County, South Gyeongsang	1987-09-18
323	Tomb of General Yun Gwan, Paju	파주 윤관장군묘; 坡州 尹瓘將軍墓	Paju, Gyeonggi	1988-02-27
324	Former Seodaemun Prison, Seoul	서울 구 서대문형무소; 서울 舊 西大門刑務所	Seodaemun District, Seoul	1988-02-27
326	Ancient Tombs in Okjeon, Hapcheon	합천 옥전 고분군; 陜川 玉田 古墳群	Hapcheon County, South Gyeongsang	1988-07-28
327	Ancient Tombs in Daho-ri, Changwon	창원 다호리 고분군; 昌原 茶戶里 古墳群	Changwon, South Gyeongsang	1988-09-03
328	Ancient Tomb in Yonggang-dong, Gyeongju	경주 용강동 고분; 慶州 龍江洞 古墳	Gyeongju, North Gyeongsang	1989-01-14
329	Goryeo White Porcelain Kiln Site in Seo-ri, Yongin	용인 서리 고려백자 요지; 龍仁 西里 高麗白磁 窯址	Yongin, Gyeonggi	1989-01-14
330	Hyochang Park, Seoul	서울 효창공원; 서울 孝昌公園	Yongsan District, Seoul	1989-06-08
332	Archaeological Site in Geomdan-ri, Ulju	울주 검단리 유적; 蔚州 檢丹里 遺蹟	Ulju County, Ulsan	1990-08-21
333	Kiln Site in Hakbong-ri, Gongju	공주 학봉리 요지; 公州 鶴峰里 窯址	Gongju, South Chungcheong	1990-08-21
334	Archaeological Site in Seokjang-ri, Gongju	공주 석장리 유적; 公州 石莊里 遺蹟	Gongju, South Chungcheong	1990-10-31
335	Shell Mound on Yeondaedo Island, Tongyeong	통영 연대도 패총; 統營 煙臺島 貝塚	Tongyeong, South Gyeongsang	1990-10-31
336	Ancient Tombs in Naksan-ri, Gumi	구미 낙산리 고분군; 龜尾 洛山里 古墳群	Gumi, North Gyeongsang	1990-10-31
337	Najueupseong Walled Town	나주읍성; 羅州邑城	Naju, South Jeolla	1990-10-31
338	Kiln Site in Gurim-ri, Yeongam	영암 구림리 요지; 靈岩 鳩林里 窯址	Yeongam County, South Jeolla	1990-10-31
339	Gyeonggijeon Shrine, Jeonju	전주 경기전; 全州 慶基殿	Jeonju, North Jeolla	1991-01-09
340	Cheongwansa Temple Site, Gyeongju	경주 천관사지; 慶州 天官寺址	Gyeongju, North Gyeongsang	1991-01-09
341	Ancient Tombs in Daeseong-dong, Gimhae	김해 대성동 고분군; 金海 大成洞 古墳群	Gimhae, South Gyeongsang	1991-01-09
342	Joseon White Porcelain Kiln Site in Sanbon-dong, Gunpo	군포 산본동 조선백자 요지; 軍浦 山本洞 朝鮮白磁 窯址	Gunpo, Gyeonggi	1991-01-09
343	Hoamsanseong Fortress, Seoul	서울 호암산성; 서울 虎巖山城	Geumcheon District, Seoul	1991-02-26
345	Celadon Kiln Site in Yonggye-ri, Gochang	고창 용계리 청자 요지; 高敞 龍溪里 靑瓷 窯址	Gochang County, North Jeolla	1991-02-26
346	Mujang-hyeon Government Office and Town Wall, Gochang	고창 무장현 관아와 읍성; 高敞 茂長縣 官衙와 邑城	Gochang County, North Jeolla	1991-02-26
347	Ancient Tombs in Ipjeom-ri, Iksan	익산 입점리 고분; 益山 笠店里 古墳	Iksan, North Jeolla	1991-02-26
348	Taebaeksan National History Archives Site, Bonghwa	봉화 태백산사고지; 奉化 太白山史庫址	Bonghwa County, North Gyeongsang	1991-02-26
349	Manboksa Temple Site, Namwon	남원 만복사지; 南原 萬福寺址	Namwon, North Jeolla	1991-03-30
350	Ancient Tombs in Gujeong-dong, Gyeongju	경주 구정동 고분군; 慶州 九政洞 古墳群	Gyeongju, North Gyeongsang	1991-03-30
351	Odusanseong Fortress, Paju	파주 오두산성; 坡州 烏頭山城	Paju, Gyeonggi	1991-08-24
352	Dongsa Temple Site, Hanam	하남 동사지; 河南 桐寺址	Hanam, Gyeonggi	1991-08-24
353	Geumseongsanseong Fortress, Damyang	담양 금성산성; 潭陽 金城山城	Damyang County, South Jeolla	1991-08-24
354	Tapgol Park, Seoul	서울 탑골공원; 서울 塔골公園	Jongno District, Seoul	1991-10-25
355	Gyejoksanseong Fortress, Daejeon	대전 계족산성; 大田 鷄足山城	Daedeok District, Daejeon	1991-10-25
356	Sungangwon Royal Tomb, Namyangju	남양주 순강원; 南楊州 順康園	Namyangju, Gyeonggi	1991-10-25
357	Yeonghoewon Royal Tomb, Gwangmyeong	광명 영회원; 光明 永懷園	Gwangmyeong, Gyeonggi	1991-10-25
358	Soryeongwon Royal Tomb, Paju	파주 소령원; 坡州 昭寧園	Paju, Gyeonggi	1991-10-25
359	Sugirwon Royal Tomb, Paju	파주 수길원; 坡州 綏吉園	Paju, Gyeonggi	1991-10-25
360	Hwigyeongwon Royal Tomb, Namyangju	남양주 휘경원; 南楊州 徽慶園	Namyangju, Gyeonggi	1991-10-25
361	Yeonghwiwon and Sunginwon Royal Tombs, Seoul	서울 영휘원과 숭인원; 서울 永徽園과 崇仁園	Dongdaemun District, Seoul	1991-10-25
362	Tomb of King Yeonsangun, Seoul	서울 연산군묘; 서울 燕山君墓	Dobong District, Seoul	1991-10-25
363	Tomb of King Gwanghaegun, Namyangju	남양주 광해군묘; 南楊州 光海君墓	Namyangju, Gyeonggi	1991-10-25
364	Tomb of Queen Consort Myeongbin, Guri	구리 명빈묘; 九里 明嬪墓	Guri, Gyeonggi	1991-10-25
365	Seongmyo Royal Tomb, Namyangju	남양주 성묘; 南楊州 成墓	Namyangju, Gyeonggi	1991-10-25
366	Tomb of Queen Consort Anbin, Namyangju	남양주 안빈묘; 南楊州 安嬪墓	Namyangju, Gyeonggi	1991-10-25
367	Tomb of Queen Consort Yeongbin, Namyangju	남양주 영빈묘; 南楊州 寧嬪墓	Namyangju, Gyeonggi	1991-10-25
369	Seongneung Royal Tomb, Ganghwa	강화 석릉; 江華 碩陵	Ganghwa County, Incheon	1992-03-10
370	Gareung Royal Tomb, Ganghwa	강화 가릉; 江華 嘉陵	Ganghwa County, Incheon	1992-03-10
371	Golleung Royal Tomb, Ganghwa	강화 곤릉; 江華 坤陵	Ganghwa County, Incheon	1992-03-10
372	Yangcheongoseong Fortress Site, Seoul	서울 양천고성지; 서울 陽川古城址	Gangseo District, Seoul	1992-03-10
373	Roof Tile Kiln Site in Jeongam-ri, Buyeo	부여 정암리 와요지; 扶餘 亭岩里 瓦窯址	Buyeo County, South Chungcheong	1992-05-04
374	Ingaksa Temple Site, Gunwi	군위 인각사지; 軍威 麟角寺址	Gunwi County, North Gyeongsang	1992-05-28
375	Archaeological Site in Sinchang-dong, Gwangju	광주 신창동 유적; 光州 新昌洞 遺蹟	Gwangsan District, Gwangju	1992-09-09
376	Archaeological Site in Joyang-dong, Sokcho	속초 조양동 유적; 束草 朝陽洞 遺蹟	Sokcho, Gangwon	1992-10-10
377	White Porcelain Kiln Site in Daedo-ri, Jangseong	장성 대도리 백자 요지; 長城 大都里 白磁 窯址	Jangseong County, South Jeolla	1992-10-10
379	Jeonjuhyanggyo Local Confucian School	전주향교; 全州鄕校	Jeonju, North Jeolla	1992-12-23
380	Jeju-mok Government Office	제주목 관아; 濟州牧 官衙	Jeju City, Jeju	1993-03-31
381	Chungminsa Shrine, Yeosu	여수 충민사; 麗水 忠愍祠	Yeosu, South Jeolla	1993-06-01
382	Godalsa Temple Site, Yeoju	여주 고달사지; 驪州 高達寺址	Yeoju, Gyeonggi	1993-07-23
383	Donamseowon Confucian Academy, Nonsan	논산 돈암서원; 論山 遯巖書院	Nonsan, South Chungcheong	1993-10-18
384	Ibamsanseong Fortress, Jangseong	장성 입암산성; 長城 笠岩山城	Jangseong County, South Jeolla	1993-11-10
385	Seokjugwanseong Fortress, Gurye	구례 석주관성; 求禮 石柱關城	Gurye County, South Jeolla	1993-11-10
386	Janggieupseong Walled Town, Pohang	포항 장기읍성; 浦項 長鬐邑城	Pohang, North Gyeongsang	1994-03-17
387	Ugeumchi Battlefield, Gongju	공주 우금치 전적; 公州 牛禁峙 戰蹟	Gongju, South Chungcheong	1994-03-17
388	Gangneung-daedohobu Government Office	강릉대도호부 관아; 江陵大都護府 官衙	Gangneung, Gangwon	1994-07-11
389	Archaeological Site in Gawol-ri and Juwol-ri, Paju	파주 가월리와 주월리 유적; 坡州 佳月里와 舟月里 遺蹟	Paju, Gyeonggi	1994-12-21
390	Temple Site in Bomun-dong, Gyeongju	경주 보문동 사지; 慶州 普門洞 寺址	Gyeongju, North Gyeongsang	1994-12-21
391	Dolmens in Jungnim-ri, Gochang	고창 죽림리 지석묘군; 高敞 竹林里 支石墓群	Gochang County, North Jeolla	1994-12-21
392	Shipbuilding Site, Yeosu	여수 선소유적; 麗水 船所遺蹟	Yeosu, South Jeolla	1995-04-20
393	Noseongsanseong Fortress, Nonsan	논산 노성산성; 論山 魯城山城	Nonsan, South Chungcheong	1995-08-02
394	Archaeological Site in Osan-ri, Yangyang	양양 오산리 유적; 襄陽 鰲山里 遺蹟	Yangyang County, Gangwon	1997-04-18
395	Sea Area with Sunken Relics near Doripo Port, Muan	무안 도리포 해저유물 매장해역; 務安 道里浦 海底遺物 埋藏海域	Muan County, South Jeolla	1997-04-18
396	Historic Site of Anti-Mongolian Struggle in Hangpadu-ri, Jeju	제주 항파두리 항몽 유적; 濟州 缸坡頭里 抗蒙 遺蹟	Jeju City, Jeju	1997-04-18
397	Military Headquarters of Jeolla-do Province, Gangjin	강진 전라병영성; 康津 全羅兵營城	Gangjin County, South Jeolla	1997-04-21
398	Archaeological Site in Suyanggae, Danyang	단양 수양개 유적; 丹陽 垂楊介 遺蹟	Danyang County, North Chungcheong	1997-10-10
399	Historic Sites of Yanghwanaru Ferry and Jamdubong Peak, Seoul	서울 양화나루와 잠두봉 유적; 서울 楊花나루와 蠶頭峰 遺蹟	Mapo District, Seoul	1997-11-11
400	Jangmisanseong Fortress, Chungju	충주 장미산성; 忠州 薔薇山城	Chungju, North Chungcheong	1997-11-11

=== Designation number from 401 – 500 ===
No	Official name in English	Official name in Korean	Location	Date of designation
401	Mireuksanseong Fortress, Goesan	괴산 미륵산성; 槐山 彌勒山城	Goesan County, North Chungcheong	1997-12-16
402	Navy Headquarters of Three Provinces, Tongyeong	통영 삼도수군통제영; 統營 三道水軍統制營	Tongyeong, South Gyeongsang	1998-02-20
403	Banwolseong Fortress, Pocheon	포천 반월성; 抱川 半月城	Pocheon, Gyeonggi	1998-02-20
404	Ancient Tombs in Bogam-ri, Naju	나주 복암리 고분군; 羅州 伏岩里 古墳群	Naju, South Jeolla	1998-02-20
405	Jeseoksa Temple Site, Iksan	익산 제석사지; 益山 帝釋寺址	Iksan, North Jeolla	1998-05-12
406	Hwangnyong Battlefield, Jangseong	장성 황룡 전적; 長城 黃龍 戰蹟	Jangseong County, South Jeolla	1998-06-10
407	Ongnyongsa Temple Site, Gwangyang	광양 옥룡사지; 光陽 玉龍寺址	Gwangyang, South Jeolla	1998-08-03
408	Archaeological Site in Wanggung-ri, Iksan	익산 왕궁리 유적; 益山 王宮里 遺蹟	Iksan, North Jeolla	1998-09-17
409	Baeksanseong Fortress, Buan	부안 백산성; 扶安 白山城	Buan County, North Jeolla	1998-09-17
410	Dolmens in Hyosan-ri and Daesin-ri, Hwasun	화순 효산리와 대신리 지석묘군; 和順 孝山里와 大薪里 支石墓郡	Hwasun County, South Jeolla	1998-09-17
411	Menhir in Jincheon-dong, Daegu	대구 진천동 입석; 大邱 辰泉洞 立石	Dalseo District, Daegu	1998-12-23
412	Archaeological Site in Gosan-ri, Jeju	제주 고산리 유적; 濟州 高山里 遺蹟	Jeju City, Jeju	1998-12-23
413	Celadon and White Porcelain Kiln Site in Bangsan-dong, Siheung	시흥 방산동 청자와 백자 요지; 始興 芳山洞 靑瓷와 白磁 窯址	Siheung, Gyeonggi	1999-06-11
414	Birthplace and Placenta Chamber of Kim Yu-sin, Jincheon	진천 김유신 탄생지와 태실; 鎭川 金庾信 誕生址와 胎室	Jincheon County, North Chungcheong	1999-06-11
415	Earthen Fortification in Jeongbuk-dong, Cheongju	청주 정북동 토성; 淸州 井北洞 土城	Cheongju, North Chungcheong	1999-10-28
416	Archaeological Site in Samyang-dong, Jeju	제주 삼양동 유적; 濟州 三陽洞 遺蹟	Jeju City, Jeju	1999-11-16
417	Historic Site Related to Song Si-yeol, Goesan	괴산 송시열 유적; 槐山 宋時烈 遺蹟	Goesan County, North Chungcheong	1999-12-29
418	Geomdansanseong Fortress, Suncheon	순천 검단산성; 順天 檢丹山城	Suncheon, South Jeolla	1999-12-29
419	Garden Site in Yonggang-dong, Gyeongju	경주 용강동 원지 유적; 慶州 龍江洞 苑址 遺蹟	Gyeongju, North Gyeongsang	1999-12-29
420	Ancient Tombs in Neungangol, Buyeo	부여 능안골 고분군; 扶餘 陵안골 古墳群	Buyeo County, South Chungcheong	2000-07-22
421	Historic Site Related to Yi Seung-hyu in Dutasan Mountain, Samcheok	삼척 두타산 이승휴 유적; 三陟 頭陀山 李承休 遺蹟	Samcheok, Gangwon	2000-09-16
422	Iseongsanseong Fortress, Hanam	하남 이성산성; 河南 二聖山城	Hanam, Gyeonggi	2000-09-16
423	Seolbongsanseong Fortress, Icheon	이천 설봉산성; 利川 雪峯山城	Icheon, Gyeonggi	2000-09-16
424	Ganghwa Anglican Church	대한성공회 강화성당; 大韓聖公會 江華聖堂	Ganghwa County, Incheon	2001-01-04
425	Archaeological Site in Hwajisan Mountain, Buyeo	부여 화지산 유적; 扶餘 花枝山 遺蹟	Buyeo County, South Chungcheong	2001-01-04
426	Archaeological Site in Munam-ri, Goseong	고성 문암리 유적; 高城 文巖里 遺蹟	Goseong County, Gangwon	2001-02-05
427	Wangheungsa Temple Site, Buyeo	부여 왕흥사지; 扶餘 王興寺址	Buyeo County, South Chungcheong	2001-02-05
428	Archaeological Site in Gwanbuk-ri, Buyeo	부여 관북리 유적; 扶餘 官北里 遺蹟	Buyeo County, South Chungcheong	2001-02-05
429	Gujibong Peak, Gimhae	김해 구지봉; 金海 龜旨峰	Gimhae, South Gyeongsang	2001-03-07
430	Archaeological Site in Songok-dong and Mulcheon-ri, Gyeongju	경주 손곡동과 물천리 유적; 慶州 蓀谷洞과 勿川里 遺蹟	Gyeongju, North Gyeongsang	2001-04-28
431	Tomb of Patriotic Martyrs, Hongseong	홍성 홍주의사총; 洪城 洪州義士塚	Hongseong County, South Chungcheong	2001-08-17
432	Historic Site Related to Yun Seon-do, Haenam	해남 윤선도 유적; 海南 尹善道 遺蹟	Haenam County, South Jeolla	2001-08-17
433	Archaeological Site in Jangseon-ri, Gongju	공주 장선리 유적; 公州 長善里 遺蹟	Gongju, South Chungcheong	2001-09-11
434	Temple Site in Neungsan-ri, Buyeo	부여 능산리 사지; 扶餘 陵山里 寺址	Buyeo County, South Chungcheong	2001-09-29
435	Geumgangsa Temple Site, Buyeo	부여 금강사지; 扶餘 金剛寺址	Buyeo County, South Chungcheong	2001-09-29
436	Seonnongdan Altar, Seoul	서울 선농단; 서울 先農壇	Dongdaemun District, Seoul	2001-12-29
437	Chiljungseong Fortress, Paju	파주 칠중성; 坡州 七重城	Paju, Gyeonggi	2002-01-29
438	Yun Po-sun's House in Anguk-dong	안국동 윤보선가; 安國洞 尹潽善家	Jongno District, Seoul	2002-01-29
439	Gangwongamyeong Provincial Office, Wonju	원주 강원감영; 原州 江原監營	Wonju, Gangwon	2002-03-09
440	Tombs in Choansan Mountain, Seoul	서울 초안산 분묘군; 서울 楚安山 墳墓群	Nowon District, Seoul	2002-03-09
441	Archaeological Site in Oido, Siheung	시흥 오이도 유적; 始興 烏耳島 遺蹟	Siheung, Gyeonggi	2002-04-01
442	Main Building of Former Daegu College of Medicine	구 대구의학전문학교 본관; 舊 大邱醫學專門學校 本館	Jung District, Daegu	2003-01-28
443	Former Daegu Provincial Hospital	구 도립대구병원; 舊 道立大邱病院	Jung District, Daegu	2003-01-28
444	Placenta Chambers of King Sejong's Sons, Seongju	성주 세종대왕자 태실; 星州 世宗大王子 胎室	Seongju County, North Gyeongsang	2003-03-06
445	Sungseonsa Temple Site, Chungju	충주 숭선사지; 忠州 崇善寺址	Chungju, North Chungcheong	2003-04-25
446	Jeongyangsanseong Fortress, Yeongwol	영월 정양산성; 寧越 正陽山城	Yeongwol County, Gangwon	2003-06-02
447	Yeongwonsanseong Fortress, Wonju	원주 영원산성; 原州 領願山城	Wonju, Gangwon	2003-06-02
448	Gulsansa Temple Site, Gangneung	강릉 굴산사지; 江陵 崛山寺址	Gangneung, Gangwon	2003-06-02
449	Shell Mound in Gungok-ri, Haenam	해남 군곡리 패총; 海南 郡谷里 貝塚	Haenam County, South Jeolla	2003-07-02
450	Archaeological Site on Neukdo Island, Sacheon	사천 늑도 유적; 泗川 勒島 遺蹟	Sacheon, South Gyeongsang	2003-07-02
451	Ancient Tombs in Maha-ri, Hwaseong	화성 마하리 고분군; 華城 馬霞里 古墳群	Hwaseong, Gyeonggi	2003-08-29
452	Outer Wall of Ganghwa Fortress	강화 외성; 江華 外城	Ganghwa County, Incheon	2003-10-25
453	Hadongeupseong Walled Town	하동읍성; 河東邑城	Hadong County, South Gyeongsang	2004-05-31
454	Ancient Tombs in Yangdong-ri, Gimhae	김해 양동리 고분군; 金海 良洞里 古墳群	Gimhae, South Gyeongsang	2004-07-24
455	Forts in Achasan Mountain	아차산 일대 보루군; 阿且山 一帶 堡壘群	Gwangjin District, Seoul	2004-10-27
456	Kiln Site in Oryang-dong, Naju	나주 오량동 요지; 羅州 五良洞 窯地	Naju, South Jeolla	2004-10-27
457	Chunyanggyo and Woljeonggyo Bridge Sites, Gyeongju	경주 춘양교지와 월정교지; 慶州 春陽橋址와 月精橋址	Gyeongju, North Gyeongsang	2004-11-27
458	Archaeological Site in Wolpyeong, Suncheon	순천 월평 유적; 順天 月坪 遺蹟	Suncheon, South Jeolla	2004-12-27
459	Mural Tomb of Bak Ik, Miryang	밀양 박익 벽화묘; 密陽 朴翊 壁畵墓	Miryang, South Gyeongsang	2005-02-05
460	Ancient Tombs in Suchon-ri, Gongju	공주 수촌리 고분군; 公州 水村里 古墳群	Gongju, South Chungcheong	2005-03-03
461	Historic Sites of Cheonggyecheon Stream, Seoul (Gwangtonggyo Bridge, Supyogyo Bridge, and Ogansumun Watergate Site)	서울 청계천 유적(광통교지,수표교지와 오간수문지); 서울 淸溪川 遺蹟(廣通橋地,水標橋址와 五間水門址)	Jongno District, Seoul	2005-03-25
463	Ancient Tombs in Nuam-ri, Chungju	충주 누암리 고분군; 忠州 樓岩里 古墳群	Chungju, North Chungcheong	2005-03-25
464	Hyeeumwon Inn Site, Paju	파주 혜음원지; 坡州 惠蔭院址	Paju, Gyeonggi	2005-06-13
465	Gyeonggyojang House, Seoul	서울 경교장; 서울 京橋莊	Jongno District, Seoul	2005-06-13
466	Beopcheonsa Temple Site, Wonju	원주 법천사지; 原州 法泉寺址	Wonju, Gangwon	2005-08-31
467	Horogoru Embankment, Yeoncheon	연천 호로고루; 漣川 瓠蘆古壘	Yeoncheon County, Gyeonggi	2006-01-02
468	Dangposeong Fortress, Yeoncheon	연천 당포성; 漣川 堂浦城	Yeoncheon County, Gyeonggi	2006-01-02
469	Eundaeriseong Fortress, Yeoncheon	연천 은대리성; 漣川 隱垈里城	Yeoncheon County, Gyeonggi	2006-01-02
470	Ancient Tombs in Hwangsang-dong, Gumi	구미 황상동 고분군; 龜尾 凰顙洞 古墳群	Gumi, North Gyeongsang	2006-03-07
471	Wibongsanseong Fortress, Wanju	완주 위봉산성; 完州 威鳳山城	Wanju County, North Jeolla	2006-04-06
472	Archaeological Site in Jindong-ri, Changwon	창원 진동리 유적; 昌原 鎭東里 遺蹟	Changwon, South Gyeongsang	2006-08-29
473	Archaeological Site in Bongseon-ri, Seocheon	서천 봉선리 유적; 舒川 鳳仙里 遺蹟	Seocheon County, South Chungcheong	2006-11-06
474	Archaeological Site in Jeongjisan Mountain, Gongju	공주 정지산 유적; 公州 艇止山 遺蹟	Gongju, South Chungcheong	2006-11-06
475	Ancient Tombs in Bujang-ri, Seosan	서산 부장리 고분군; 瑞山 富長里 古墳群	Seosan, South Chungcheong	2006-11-06
476	Ancient Tomb in Hwangseong-dong, Gyeongju	경주 황성동 고분; 慶州 隍城洞 古墳	Gyeongju, North Gyeongsang	2007-01-02
477	Archaeological Site in Bongnyong-dong, Sangju	상주 복룡동 유적; 尙州 伏龍洞 遺蹟	Sangju, North Gyeongsang	2007-05-31
478	Temporary Palace at Hwaseong Fortress, Suwon	수원 화성행궁; 水原 華城行宮	Suwon, Gyeonggi	2007-06-08
479	Temporary Palace Site at Bukhansanseong Fortress	북한산성 행궁지; 北漢山城 行宮址	Goyang, Gyeonggi	2007-06-08
480	Temporary Palace at Namhansanseong Fortress	남한산성 행궁; 南漢山城 行宮	Gwangju, Gyeonggi	2007-06-08
481	Hongsan-hyeon Government Office, Buyeo	부여 홍산현 관아; 扶餘 鴻山縣 官衙	Buyeo County, South Chungcheong	2007-07-31
482	Gimje-gun Government Office and Local Confucian School	김제군 관아와 향교; 金堤郡 官衙와 鄕校	Gimje, North Jeolla	2007-07-31
483	Naju-mok Government Office and Local Confucian School	나주목 관아와 향교; 羅州牧 官衙와 鄕校	Naju, South Jeolla	2007-07-31
484	Geoje-hyeon Government Office	거제현 관아; 巨濟縣 官衙	Geoje, South Gyeongsang	2007-07-31
485	Historic Site of Anti-Japanese Army in Ssangsan Mountain, Hwasun	화순 쌍산 항일의병 유적; 和順 雙山 抗日義兵 遺蹟	Hwasun County, South Jeolla	2007-08-03
486	Shell Mound in Bibong-ri, Changnyeong	창녕 비봉리 패총; 昌寧 飛鳳里 貝塚	Changnyeong County, South Gyeongsang	2007-08-28
487	Kim Jeong-hui's Home in Exile, Seogwipo	서귀포 김정희 유배지; 西歸浦 金正喜 流配址	Seogwipo, Jeju	2007-10-05
488	Dodongseowon Confucian Academy, Dalseong	달성 도동서원; 達城 道東書院	Dalseong County, Daegu	2007-10-10
489	Archaeological Site in Sinmae-ri, Chuncheon	춘천 신매리 유적; 春川 新梅里 遺蹟	Chuncheon, Gangwon	2007-11-14
490	Archaeological Site in Chodang-dong, Gangneung	강릉 초당동 유적; 江陵 草堂洞 遺蹟	Gangneung, Gangwon	2007-12-03
491	Altar for Prince Geumseong, Yeongju	영주 금성대군 신단; 榮州 錦城大君 神壇	Yeongju, North Gyeongsang	2007-12-31
492	Marosanseong Fortress, Gwangyang	광양 마로산성; 光陽 馬老山城	Gwangyang, South Jeolla	2007-12-31
493	Beopgwangsa Temple Site, Pohang	포항 법광사지; 浦項 法光寺址	Pohang, North Gyeongsang	2008-01-30
494	Gosaburiseong Fortress, Jeongeup	정읍 고사부리성; 井邑 古沙夫里城	Jeongeup, North Jeolla	2008-05-28
495	Naksansa Temple and Surroundings, Yangyang	양양 낙산사 일원; 襄陽 洛山寺 一圓	Yangyang County, Gangwon	2008-12-18
496	Geumsansa Temple and Surroundings, Gimje	김제 금산사 일원; 金堤 金山寺 一圓	Gimje, North Jeolla	2008-12-18
497	Ihwajang House, Seoul	서울 이화장; 서울 梨花莊	Jongno District, Seoul	2009-04-28
498	Seokdaedeul Battlefield, Jangheung	장흥 석대들 전적; 長興 石臺들 戰蹟	Jangheung County, South Jeolla	2009-05-11
499	Namgyeseowon Confucian Academy, Hamyang	함양 남계서원; 咸陽 灆溪書院	Hamyang County, South Gyeongsang	2009-05-26
500	Ancient Tombs in Bojeong-dong, Yongin	용인 보정동 고분군; 龍仁 寶亭洞 古墳群	Yongin, Gyeonggi	2009-06-24

=== Designation number from 501 – 600 ===
No	Official name in English	Official name in Korean	Location	Date of designation
501	Navy Headquarters of Chungcheong-do Province, Boryeong	보령 충청수영성; 保寧 忠淸水營城	Boryeong, South Chungcheong	2009-08-24
502	Bulguksa Temple, Gyeongju	경주 불국사; 慶州 佛國寺	Gyeongju, North Gyeongsang	2009-12-21
503	Beopjusa Temple, Boeun	보은 법주사; 報恩 法住寺	Boeun County, North Chungcheong	2009-12-21
504	Haeinsa Temple, Hapcheon	합천 해인사; 陜川 海印寺	Hapcheon County, South Gyeongsang	2009-12-21
505	Hwaeomsa Temple, Gurye	구례 화엄사; 求禮 華嚴寺	Gurye County, South Jeolla	2009-12-21
506	Songgwangsa Temple, Suncheon	순천 송광사; 順天 松廣寺	Suncheon, South Jeolla	2009-12-21
507	Seonamsa Temple, Suncheon	순천 선암사; 順天 仙巖寺	Suncheon, South Jeolla	2009-12-21
508	Daeheungsa Temple, Haenam	해남 대흥사; 海南 大興寺	Haenam County, South Jeolla	2009-12-21
509	Dundeokgiseong Fortress, Geoje	거제 둔덕기성; 巨濟 屯德岐城	Geoje, South Gyeongsang	2010-08-24
510	Kiln Sites in Sabu-dong and Gisan-dong, Goryeong	고령 사부동과 기산동 요지; 高靈 沙鳧洞과 箕山洞 窯址	Goryeong County, North Gyeongsang	2011-07-28
511	Kiln Sites in Sansu-ri and Samyong-ri, Jincheon	진천 산수리와 삼용리 요지; 鎭川 山水里와 三龍里 窯址	Jincheon County, North Chungcheong	2011-07-28
512	Daereungwon Ancient Tomb Complex, Gyeongju	경주 대릉원 일원; 慶州 大陵園 一圓	Gyeongju, North Gyeongsang	2011-07-28
513	Ancient Tombs in Bannam, Naju	나주 반남 고분군; 羅州 潘南 古墳群	Naju, South Jeolla	2011-07-28
514	Ancient Tombs in Gyo-dong and Songhyeon-dong, Changnyeong	창녕 교동과 송현동 고분군; 昌寧 校洞과 松峴洞 古墳群	Changnyeong County, South Gyeongsang	2011-07-28
515	Ancient Tombs in Marisan Mountain, Haman	함안 말이산 고분군; 咸安 末伊山 古墳群	Haman County, South Gyeongsang	2011-07-28
516	Ancient Tombs in Imdang-dong and Joyeong-dong, Gyeongsan	경산 임당동과 조영동 고분군; 慶山 林堂洞과 造永洞 古墳群	Gyeongsan, North Gyeongsang	2011-07-28
517	Tomb of King Jinji, Gyeongju	경주 진지왕릉; 慶州 眞智王陵	Gyeongju, North Gyeongsang	2011-07-28
518	Tomb of King Munseong, Gyeongju	경주 문성왕릉; 慶州 文聖王陵	Gyeongju, North Gyeongsang	2011-07-28
519	Buncheong Kiln Site in Undae-ri, Goheung	고흥 운대리 분청사기 요지; 高興 雲垈里 粉靑沙器 窯址	Goheung County, South Jeolla	2011-12-23
520	Yongsan Theological School, Seoul	서울 용산신학교; 서울 龍山神學校	Yongsan District, Seoul	2012-06-20
521	Wonhyo-ro Catholic Church, Seoul	서울 원효로 예수성심성당; 서울 元曉路 예수聖心聖堂	Yongsan District, Seoul	2012-06-20
522	Archaeological Site in Yongdam-dong, Jeju	제주 용담동 유적; 濟州 龍潭洞 遺蹟	Jeju City, Jeju	2012-05-17
523	Stone Fortress, Yeosu	여수 석보; 麗水 石堡	Yeosu, South Jeolla	2012-06-22
524	Jungyeongmyo and Yeonggyeongmyo Royal Tombs, Samcheok	삼척 준경묘·영경묘; 三陟 濬慶墓·永慶墓	Samcheok, Gangwon	2012-07-12
525	Historic Site Related to Yi I, Paju	파주 이이 유적; 坡州 李珥 遺蹟	Paju, Gyeonggi	2013-02-21
526	Daemosanseong Fortress, Yangju	양주 대모산성; 楊州 大母山城	Yangju, Gyeonggi	2013-06-21
527	Chuseongsanseong Fortress, Jeungpyeong	증평 추성산성; 曾坪 杻城山城	Jeungpyeong County, North Chungcheong	2014-01-23
528	Embankment at Yaksa-dong, Ulsan	울산 약사동 제방; 蔚山 藥泗洞 堤防	Jung District, Ulsan	2014-09-16
529	Historic Site Related to Catholic Priest Kim Dae-geon at Solmoe Maeul, Dangjin	당진 솔뫼마을 김대건신부 유적; 唐津 솔뫼마을 金大建神父 遺蹟	Dangjin, South Chungcheong	2014-09-26
530	imgokseowon Confucian Academy, Yongin	용인 심곡서원; 龍仁 深谷書院	Yongin, Gyeonggi	2015-01-28
531	Ancient Tombs in Bongdeok-ri, Gochang	고창 봉덕리 고분군; 高敞 鳳德里 古墳群	Gochang County, North Jeolla	2015-09-24
532	Okdongseowon Confucian Academy, Sangju	상주 옥동서원; 尙州 玉洞書院	North Gyeongsang	2015-11-10
533	Temple Site of Inwang-dong, Gyeongju	경주 인왕동 사지; 慶州 仁旺洞 寺址	Gyeongju, North Gyeongsang	2016-01-28
534	Yeongwol-bu Government Office	영월부 관아; 寧越府 官衙	Yeongwol County, Gangwon	2016-03-08
535	Jeolla Right Naval Headquarters, Haenam	해남 전라우수영; 海南 全羅右水營	Haenam County, South Jeolla	2016-09-30
536	Fortress in Dogi-dong, Anseong	안성 도기동 산성; 安城 道基洞 山城	Anseong, Gyeonggi	2016-10-24
537	Deokjinsanseong Fortress, Paju	파주 덕진산성; 坡州 德津山城	Paju, Gyeonggi	2017-01-19
538	Gyeongsanggamyeong Provincial Office Site, Daegu	대구 경상감영지; 大邱 慶尙監營址	Jung District, Daegu	2017-04-26
539	Ancient Tombs in Yeonsan-dong, Busan	부산 연산동 고분군; 釜山 蓮山洞 古墳群	Yeonje District, Busan	2017-06-30
540	Nogangseowon Confucian Academy, Nonsan	논산 노강서원; 論山 魯岡書院	Nonsan, South Chungcheong	2017-08-31
541	Archaeological Site in Jukmak-dong, Buan	부안 죽막동 유적; 扶安 竹幕洞 遺蹟	Buan County, North Jeolla	2017-10-19
542	Ancient Tombs in Yugok-ri and Durak-ri, Namwon	남원 유곡리와 두락리 고분군; 南原酉谷里와 斗洛里古墳群	Namwon, North Jeolla	2018-03-28
543	Ancient Tombs in Eunseon-ri and Dogye-ri, Jeongeup	정읍 은선리와 도계리 고분군; 井邑 隱仙里와 道溪里 古墳群	Jeongeup, North Jeolla	2018-04-26
544	Ancient Tombs in Guam-dong, Daegu	대구 구암동 고분군; 大邱 鳩岩洞 古墳群	Buk District, Daegu	2018-08-07

== See also ==
- Heritage preservation in South Korea
- National Museum of Korea
- National Treasures of South Korea
- Important Intangible Cultural Properties of Korea
