= Kiln Site in Beopgi-ri, Yangsan =

Archaeological site in Yangsan, South Korea

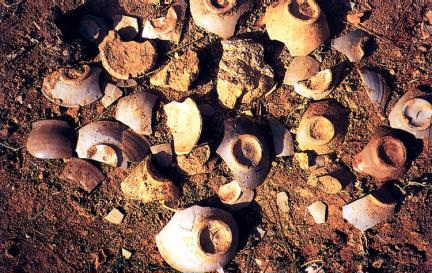
- Remains of the site
- Location: Yangsan, South Korea

Historic Sites of South Korea
- Designated: 1963-01-21

The Kiln Site in Beopgi-ri, Yangsan (Korean: 양산 법기리 요지; Hanja: 梁山法基里窯址) is a Joseon-era archaeological site in Yangsan, South Korea. On January 21, 1963, it was made a Historic Site of South Korea.

The site consists of kilns used in the 16tth and 17th centuries, during the Joseon period, to make pottery. Afterwards, houses and tombs were built over the site, which damaged the original kilns. Pottery pieces have been recovered from the site. Some of the products are believed to have been made for export to Japan.
