= Kwanmunsŏng =

Fortress in North and South Gyeongsang, South Korea

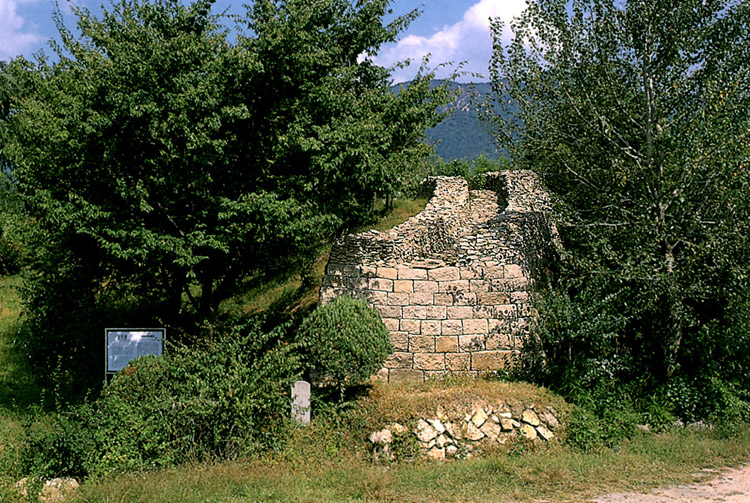
- Some of the fortress's ruins (2003)
- Interactive map of Kwanmunsŏng
- Location: North and South Gyeongsang, South Korea
- Coordinates: 35°40′12″N 129°20′05″E

Historic Sites of South Korea
- Official name: Gwanmunseong Fortress
- Designated: 1963-01-21
- Reference no.: 48

Kwanmunsŏng (Korean: 관문성; Hanja: 關門城; RR: Gwanmunseong) was a Unified Silla-era Korean fortress located in North and South Gyeongsang Province, South Korea. On January 21, 1963, it was made a Historic Site of South Korea.

It was built in 722 (Korean calendar), during the reign of King Seongdeok. It was meant to protect the Silla capital of Gyeongju. Its walls have a total length is 12 km (7.5 mi). It was in ruins by the early Joseon period. Part of it was used during the 1592–1598 Imjin War. In recent years, most of its structures are in ruins.
