= Dolmens in Guam-ri, Buan =

Bronze Age tombs in Buan, South Korea

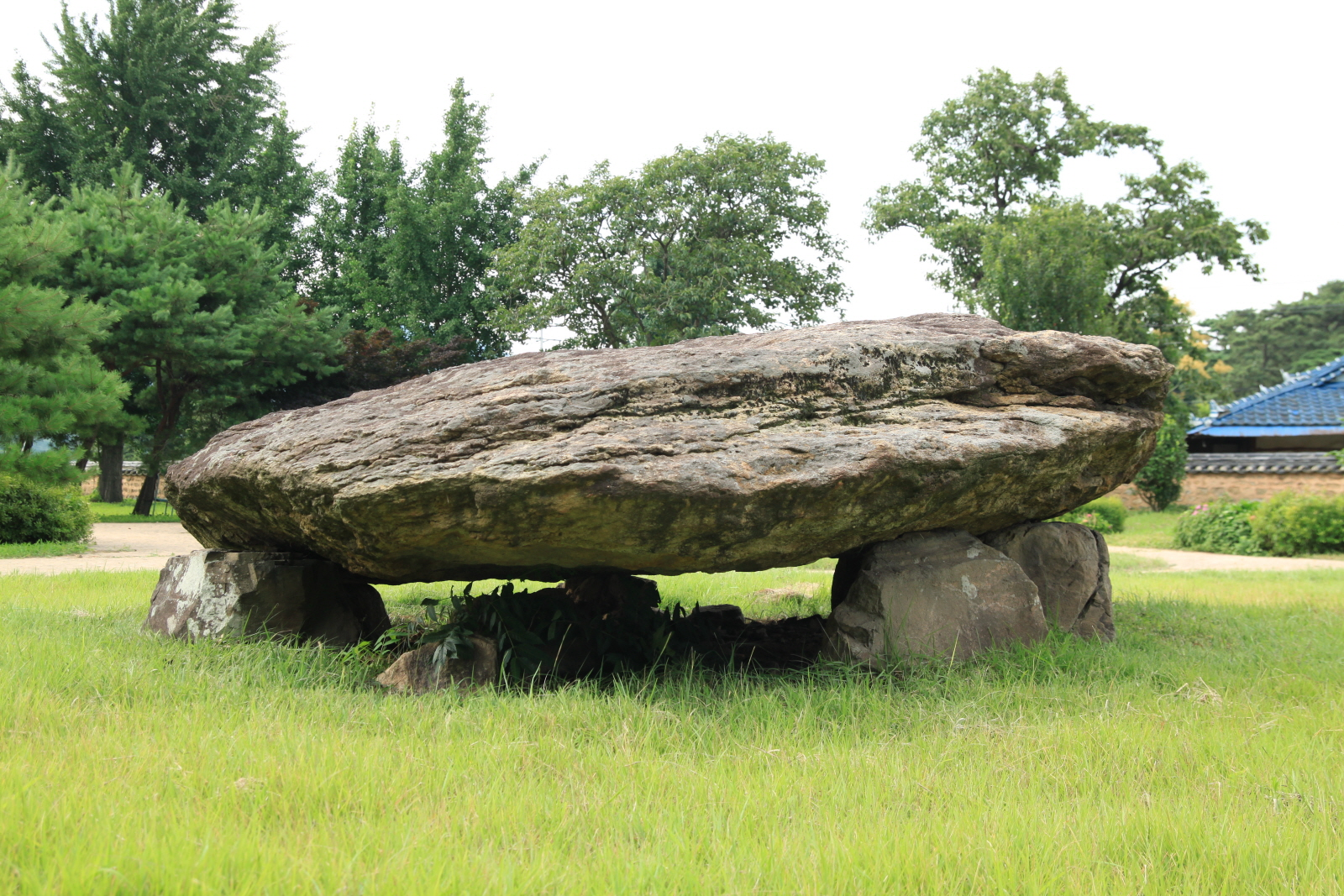
- One of the tombs (2010)
- Interactive map of Dolmens in Guam-ri, Buan
- Location: Buan County, South Korea
- Coordinates: 35°42′30.1″N 126°39′13.5″E

Historic Sites of South Korea
- Designated: 1963-01-21

There are a number of Bronze Age dolmens in Guam-ri, Buan County (Korean: 부안 구암리 지석묘군; Hanja: 扶安龜岩里支石墓群), South Korea. On January 21, 1963, they were designated a Historic Site of South Korea.

There were originally 13, but only 10 remain.
