= Mongchontoseong station =

Train station in South Korea

몽촌토성 (평화의문); Mongchontoseong (World Peace Gate)
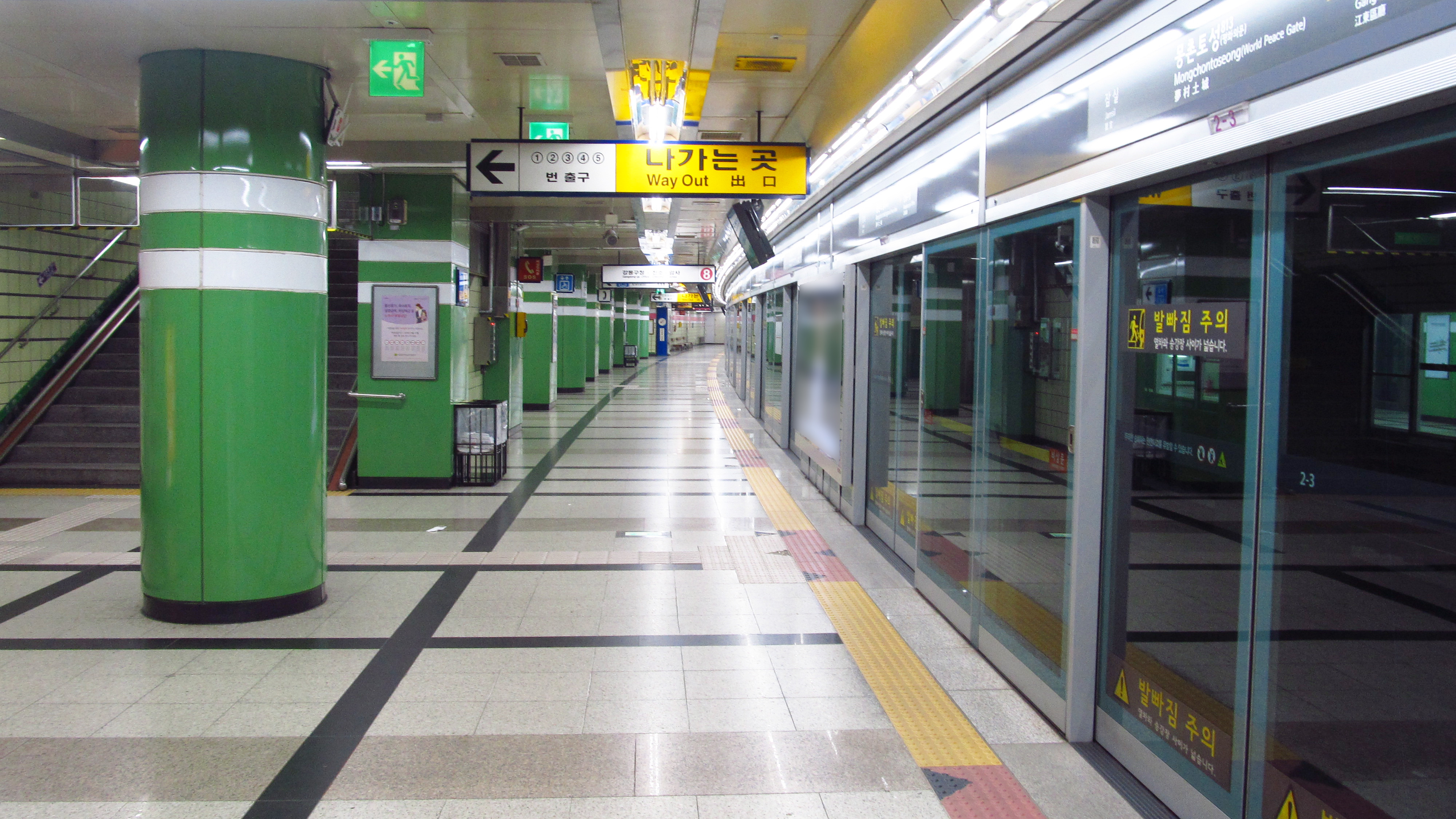

Korean name
- Hangul: 몽촌토성역
- Hanja: 夢村土城驛
- Revised Romanization: Mongchontoseong-yeok
- McCune–Reischauer: Mongch'ont'osŏng-yŏk

General information
- Location: 44 Bangi 2-dong, Songpa-gu, Seoul
- Coordinates: 37°31′03″N 127°06′46″E
- Operated by: Seoul Metro
- Line(s): Line 8
- Platforms: 2
- Tracks: 2

Construction
- Structure type: Underground

Key dates
- July 2, 1999: Line 8 opened
Location

Mongchontoseong Station is a railway station on Line 8 of the Seoul Metropolitan Subway. Its station subname is World Peace Gate, where said location is nearby.

== Station layout ==
Gangdong-gu Office ↑
| N/B
↓ Jamsil

Northbound	← ● Line 8 toward Byeollae
Southbound	● Line 8 toward Moran →

== Gallery ==
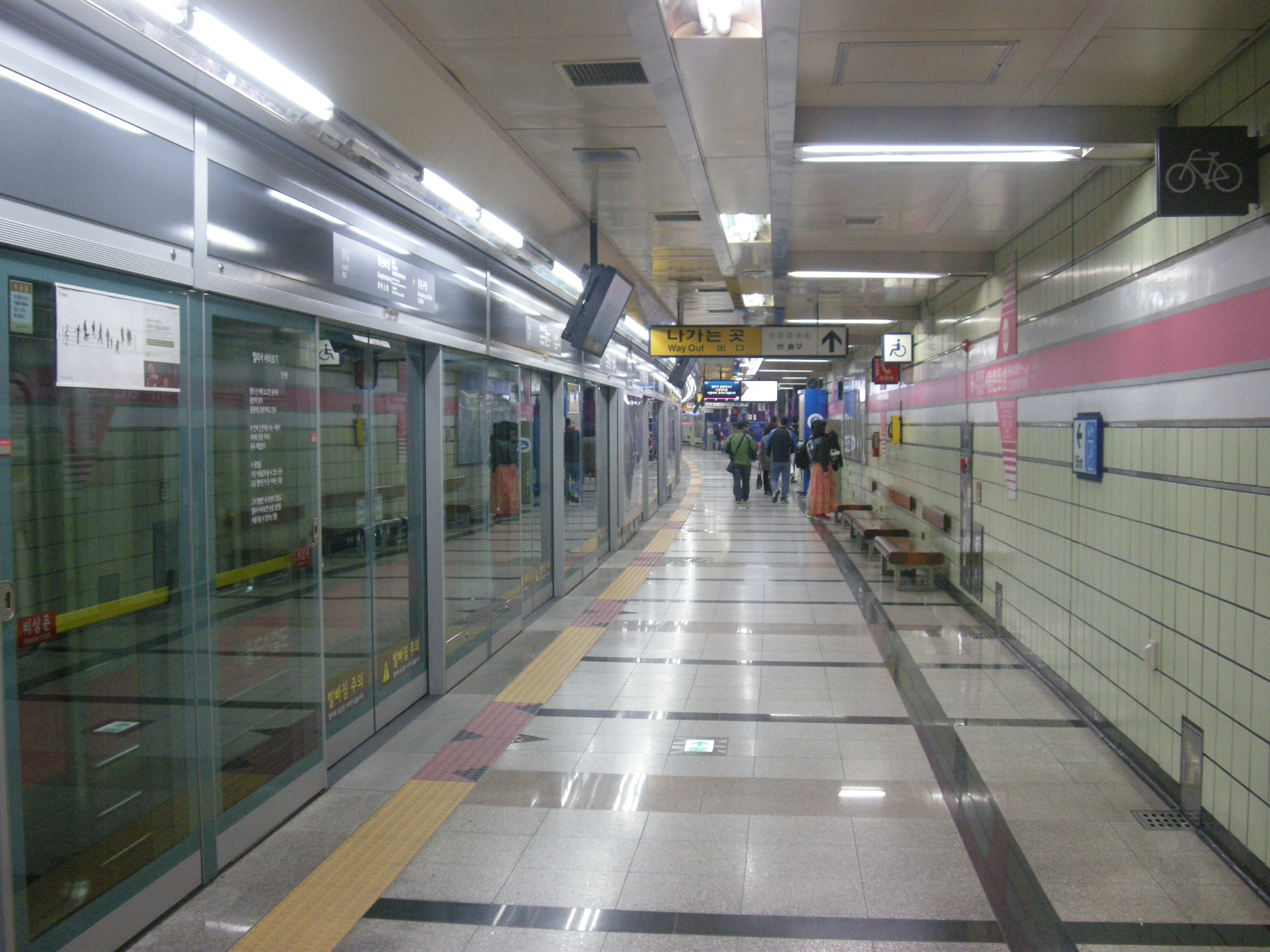
Mongchontoseong station, 2013

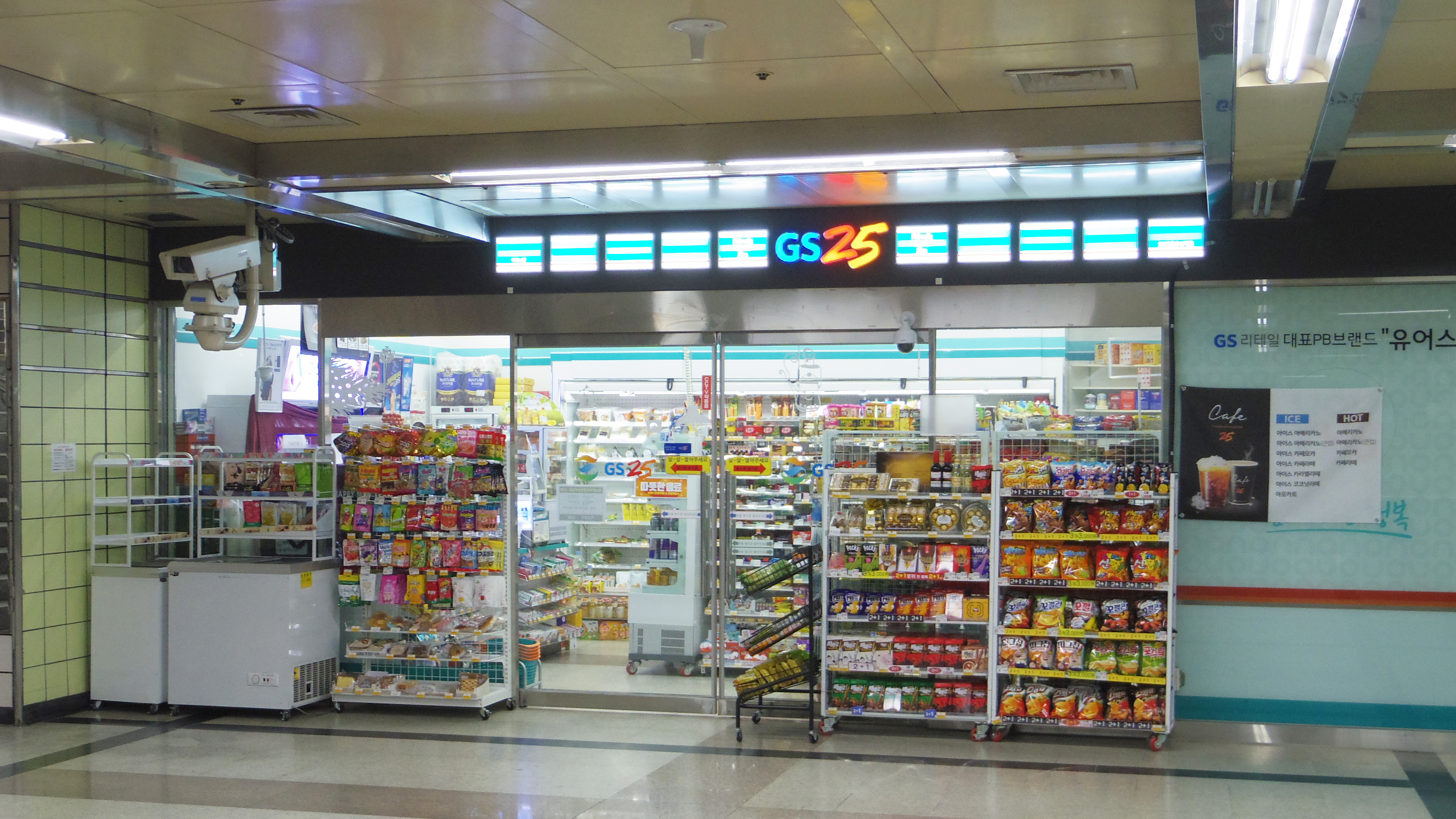
Shop in Mongchontoseong station, 2018

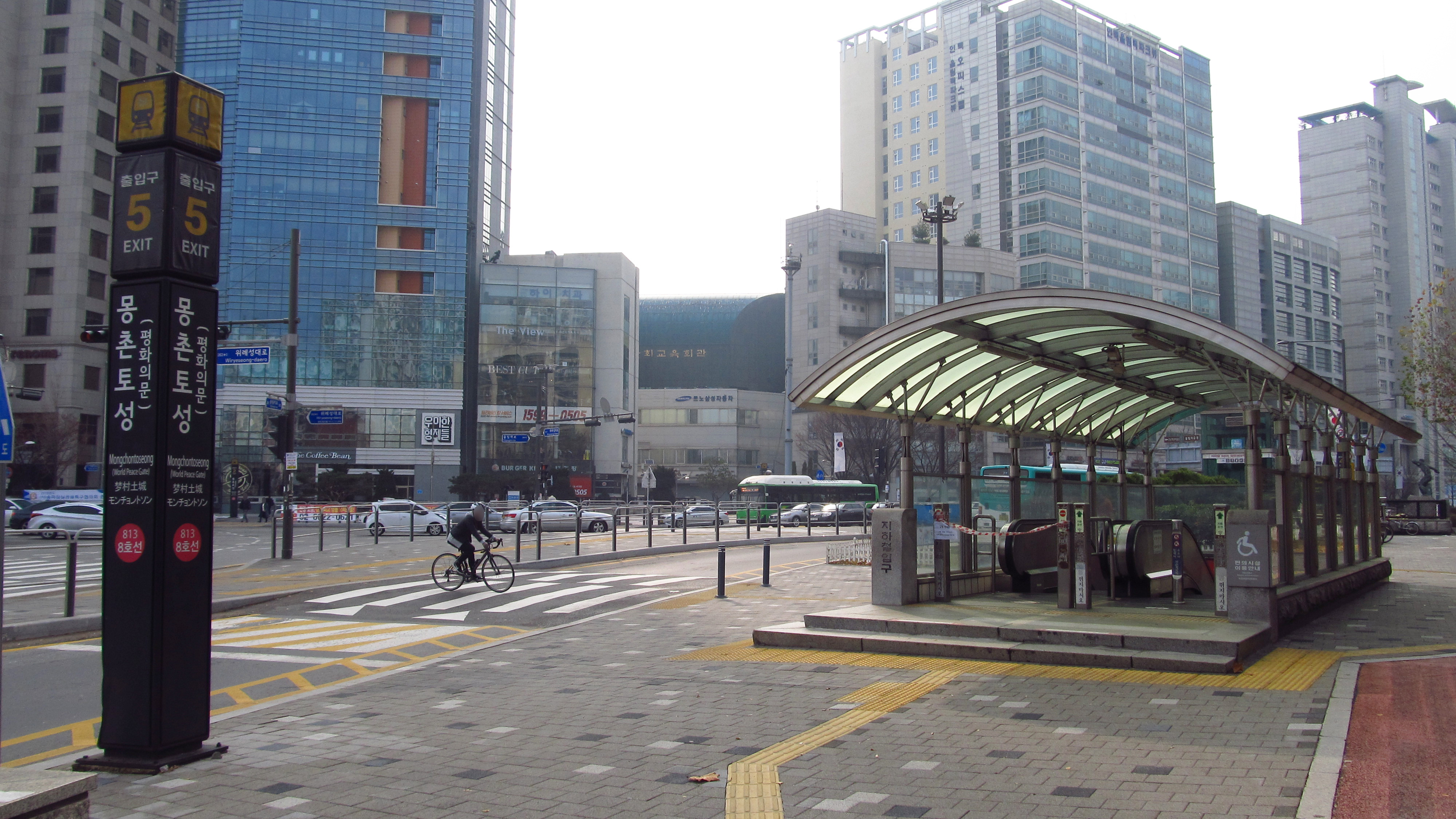
An entrance/exit to Mongchontoseong station, 2018

Preceding station	Seoul Metropolitan Subway	Following station
Gangdong-gu Office towards Byeollae	Line 8	Jamsil towards Moran
