= Sinheung station (Seongnam) =

Metro station in Seongnam, South Korea

신흥; Sinheung
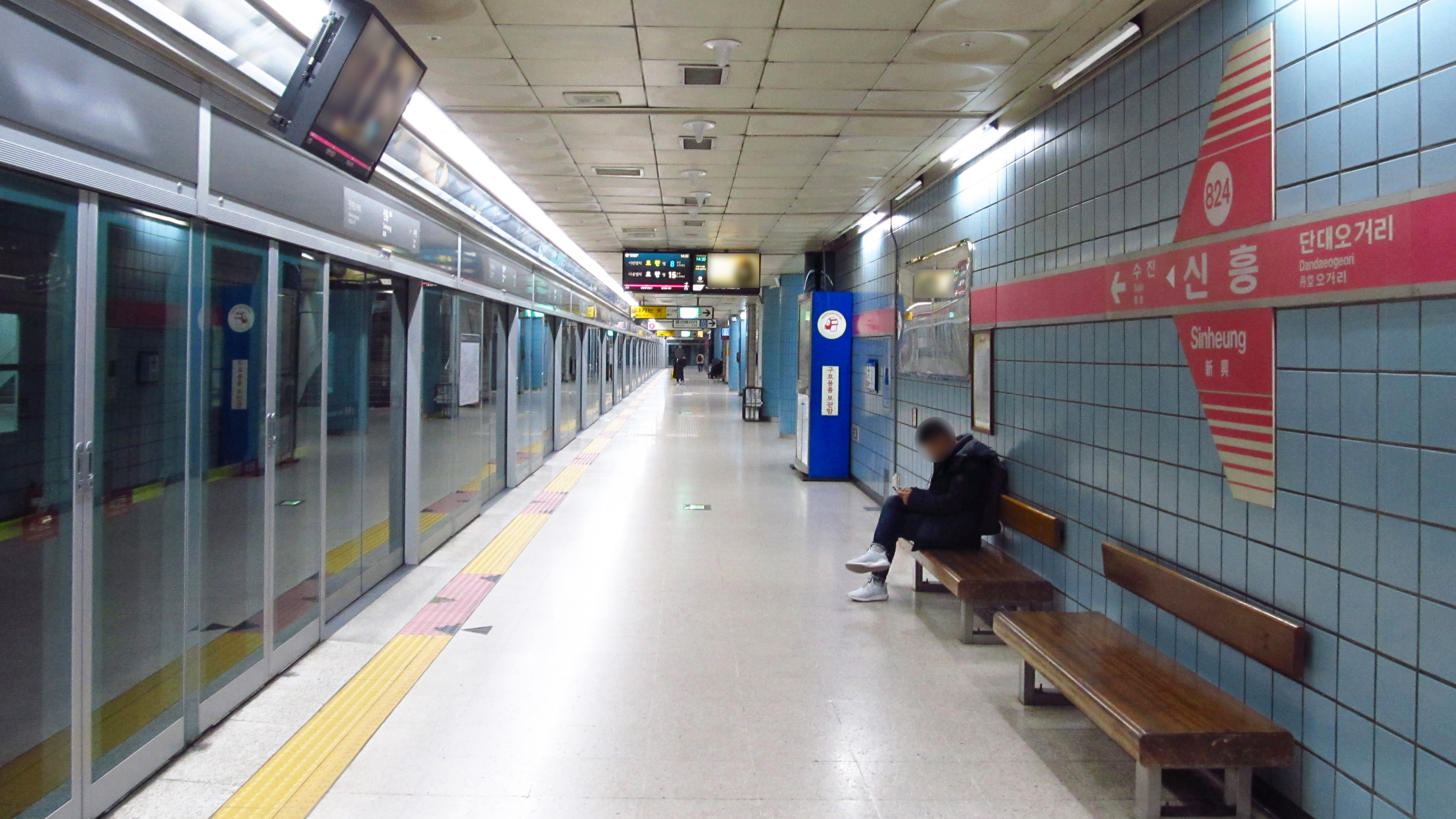

Korean name
- Hangul: 신흥역
- Hanja: 新興驛
- Revised Romanization: Sinheung-yeok
- McCune–Reischauer: Sinhŭng-yŏk

General information
- Location: 2467 Sinheung 3-dong, Sujeong-gu, Seongnam-si, Gyeonggi-do
- Coordinates: 37°26′27″N 127°08′51″E
- Operated by: Seoul Metro
- Line(s): Line 8
- Platforms: 2
- Tracks: 2

Construction
- Structure type: Underground

Key dates
- November 23, 1996: Line 8 opened

Sinheung Station is a railway station on Seoul Subway Line 8.

== Station layout ==
Dandaeogeori ↑
| N/B
↓ Sujin

Northbound	← ● Line 8 toward Byeollae
Southbound	● Line 8 toward Moran →

Preceding station	Seoul Metropolitan Subway	Following station
Dandaeogeori towards Byeollae	Line 8	Sujin towards Moran
