= Namhansanseong station =

Metro station in Seongnam, South Korea

| 남한산성입구 (성남법원·검찰청); Namhansanseong (Seongnam Court & Prosecutors' Office) |
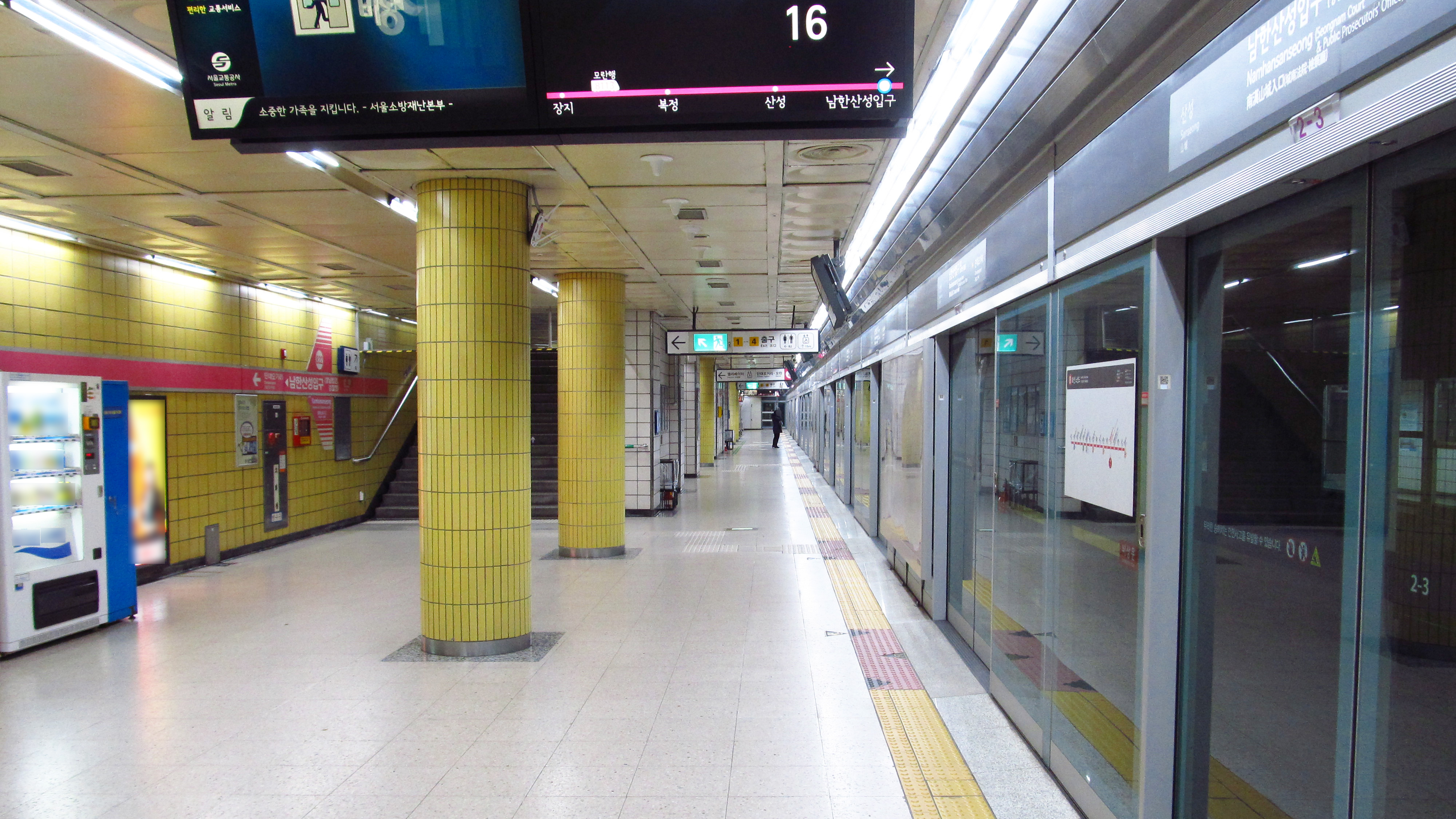

Korean name
- Hangul: 남한산성입구역
- Hanja: 南漢山城入口驛
- Revised Romanization: Namhansanseongipgu-yeok
- McCune–Reischauer: Namhansansŏngipku-yŏk

General information
- Location: 4769 Dandae-dong, Sujeong-gu, Seongnam-si, Gyeonggi-do
- Coordinates: 37°27′06″N 127°09′35″E
- Operated by: Seoul Metro
- Line(s): Line 8
- Platforms: 2
- Tracks: 2

Construction
- Structure type: Underground

Key dates
- November 23, 1996: Line 8 opened

Namhansanseong station is a railway station on Seoul Subway Line 8.

== Vicinity ==
- Exit 1: Way to Namhansanseong, Sangwon Elementary School, Seongnam Central Hospital, Eunhaeng 2-dong, Eunhaeng Market, Jungbu Elementary School
- Exit 2: Geumgwang 2-dong, Geumgwang Market, Dandae Jugong APT, Samik APT, Seongnamdong Elementary School, Seongnam Phil Orthopedic Hospital, Way to Shingu University, Hyundai APT
- Exit 3: Dandae-dong, Dandae-dong Office, Seongnamseo Middle School, Seongnam District Tax Office
- Exit 4: Dandae Park, Dandae-dong Post Office, Dandae Elementary School, Seongnam Registration Office, Seongnam Court and Public Procecutor's Office, Yangji-dong Office, Way to Eulji University

== Station layout ==
Sanseong ↑
| N/B
↓ Dandaeogeori

| Northbound | ← ● Line 8 toward Byeollae |
| Southbound | ● Line 8 toward Moran → |

| Preceding station | Seoul Metropolitan Subway | Following station |
|---|---|---|
| Sanseong towards Byeollae | Line 8 | Dandaeogeori towards Moran |
