= Namwirye station =

Metro station in Seongnam, South Korea

남위례; Namwirye
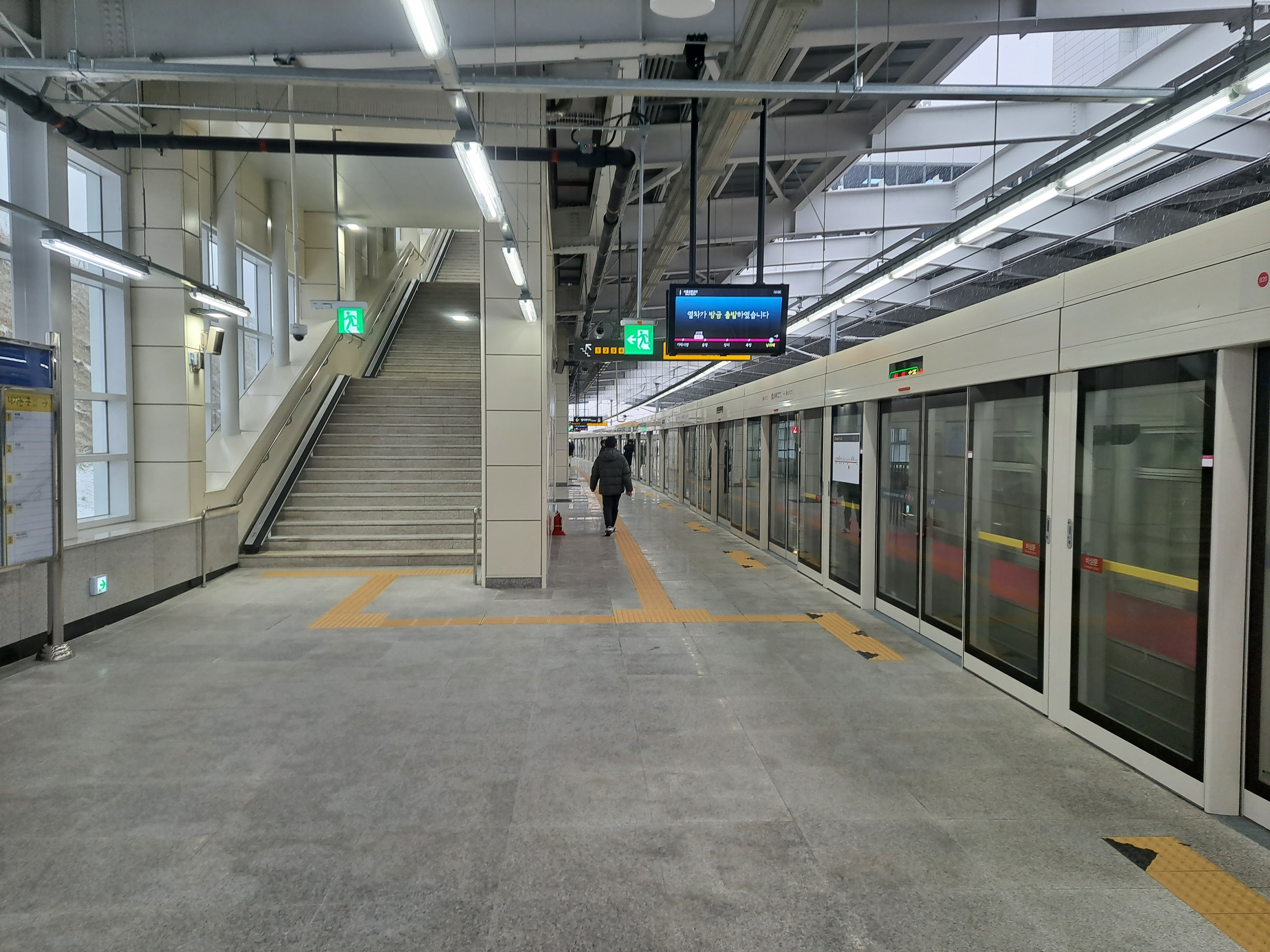
- Namwirye station's platform

Korean name
- Hangul: 남위례역
- Hanja: 南慰禮驛
- RR: Namwirye-yeok
- MR: Namwirye-yŏk

General information
- Location: Bokjeong-dong, Sujeong-gu, Seongnam, Gyeonggi Province
- Coordinates: 37.4628°N 127.1392°E
- Operator: Seoul Metro
- Line: Line 8
- Platforms: 2
- Tracks: 2

Construction
- Structure type: Aboveground

Key dates
- December 18, 2021: Line 8 opened
Location

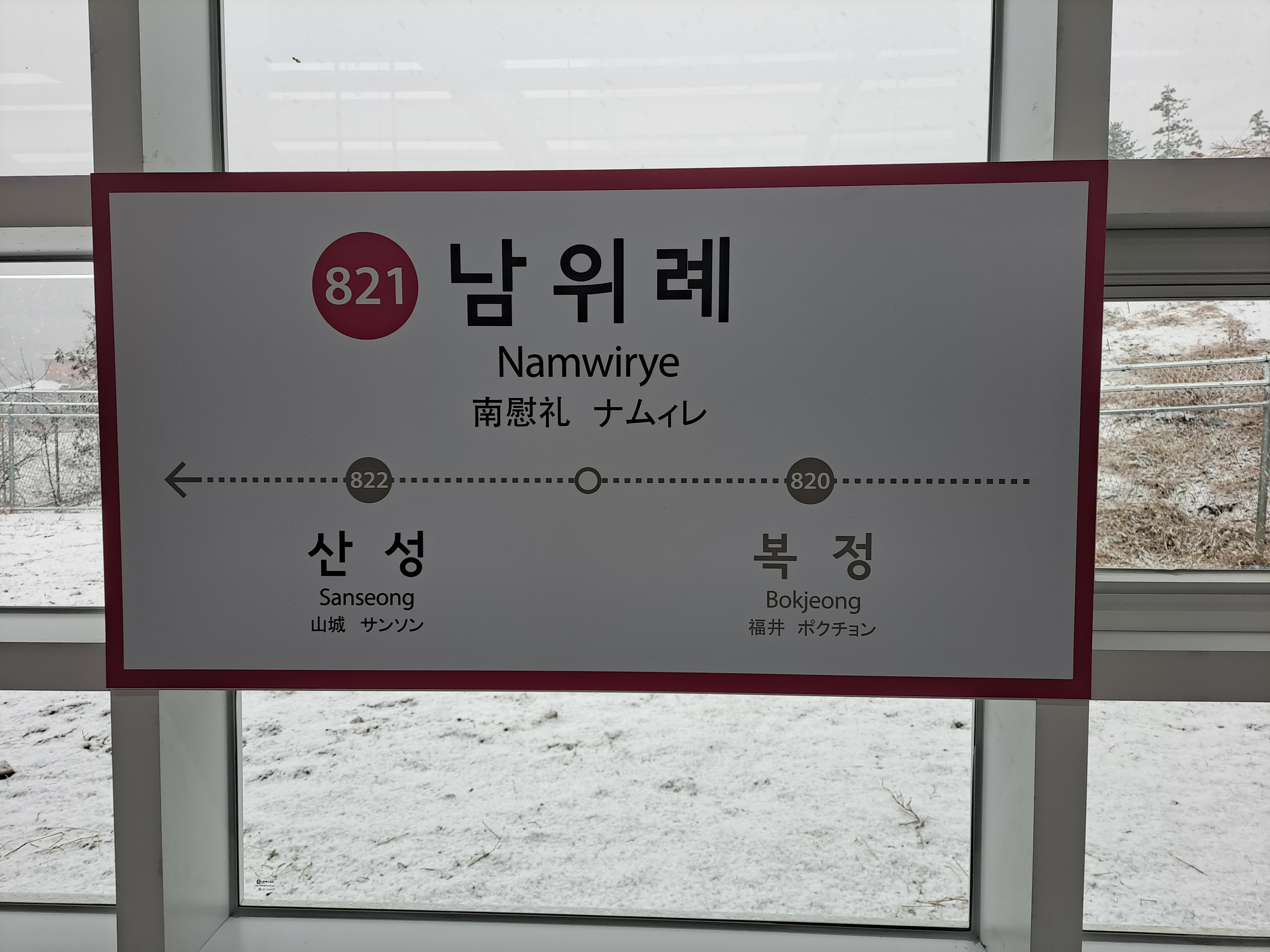
Namwirye station's nameplate

Namwirye station (Korean: 남위례역) is an infill railway station on Line 8 of the Seoul Metropolitan Subway system in South Korea. It opened on December 18, 2021. This station was constructed for Wirye New Town, but it is not located inside of Wirye.

Namwirye is also the only station of Line 8 on above ground.

== Station layout ==
Bokjeong ↑
S/B | | N/B
↓ Sanseong

Northbound	← ● Line 8 toward Byeollae
Southbound	● Line 8 toward Moran →

Preceding station	Seoul Metropolitan Subway	Following station
Bokjeong towards Byeollae	Line 8	Sanseong towards Moran
