= Dandaeogeori station =

Metro station in Seongnam, South Korea

| 단대오거리 (신구대학교); Dandaeogeori (Shingu College) |
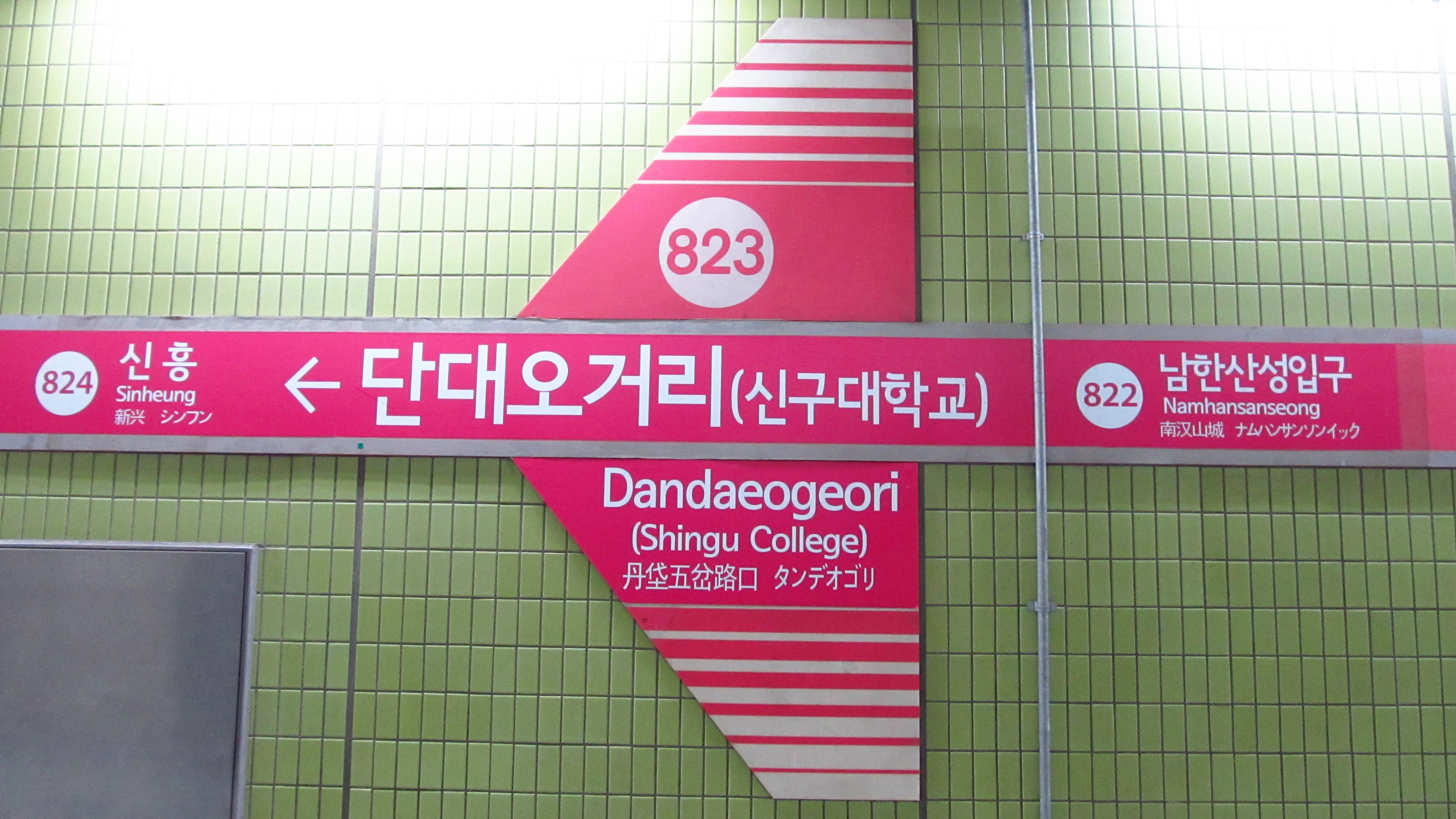

Korean name
- Hangul: 단대오거리역
- Hanja: 丹垈오거리驛
- Revised Romanization: Dandae-ogeori-yeok
- McCune–Reischauer: Tandae-ogŏri-yŏk

General information
- Location: 2458 Sinheung 2-dong, Sujeong-gu, Seongnam-si, Gyeonggi-do
- Coordinates: 37°26′42″N 127°09′24″E
- Operator: Seoul Metro
- Line: Line 8
- Platforms: 2
- Tracks: 2

Construction
- Structure type: Underground

Key dates
- November 23, 1996: Line 8 opened
Location

Dandaeogeori Station is a railway station on Seoul Subway Line 8. Despite its name, this station is far away from Dankook University.

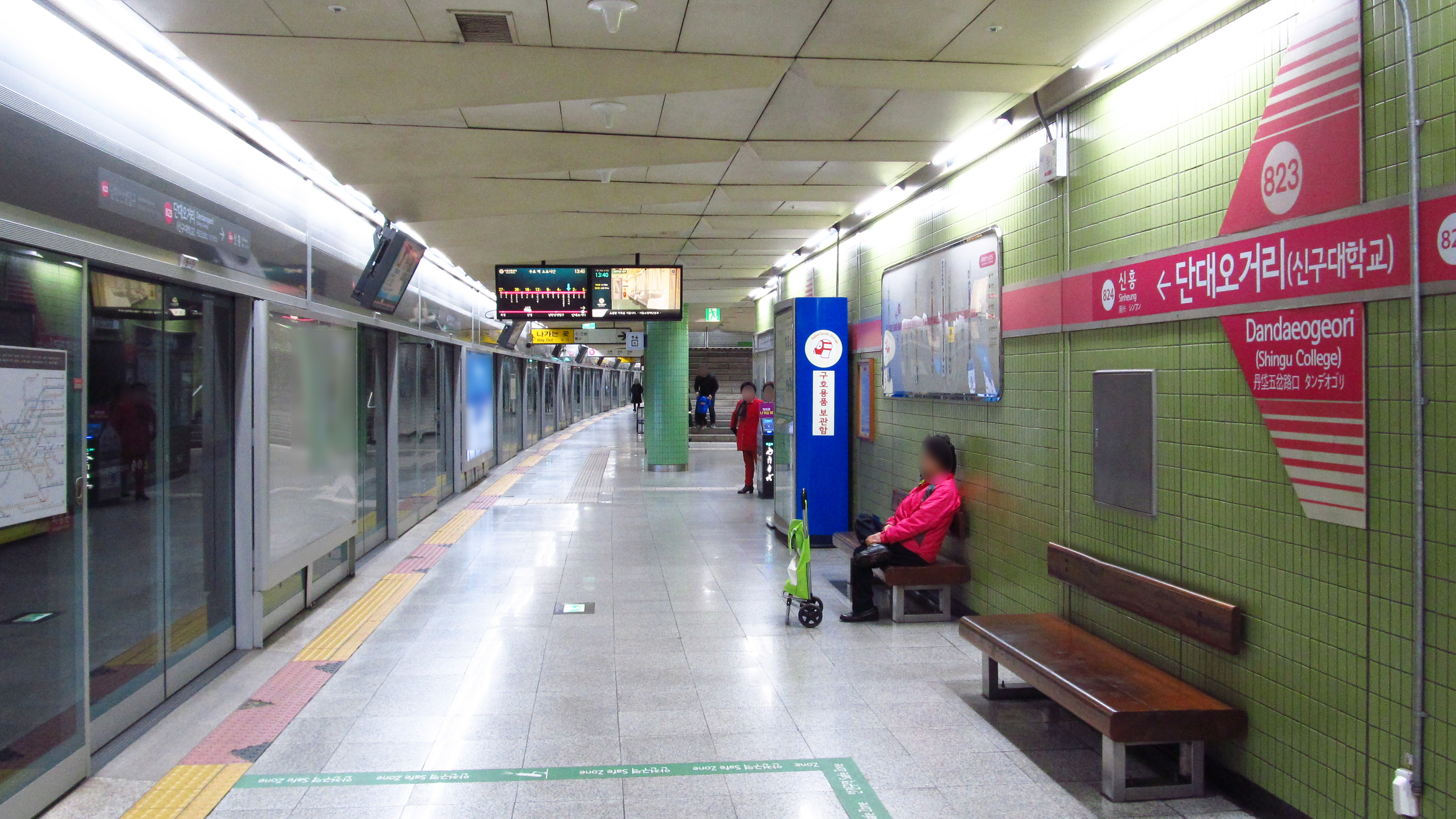

== Station layout ==
Namhansanseong ↑
S/B | | N/B
↓ Sinheung

| Northbound | ← ● Line 8 toward Byeollae |
| Southbound | ● Line 8 toward Moran → |

| Preceding station | Seoul Metropolitan Subway | Following station |
|---|---|---|
| Namhansanseong towards Byeollae | Line 8 | Sinheung towards Moran |
