= Sanseong station =

Metro station in Seongnam, South Korea

Coordinates: 37°27′25″N 127°09′00″E

산성; Sanseong
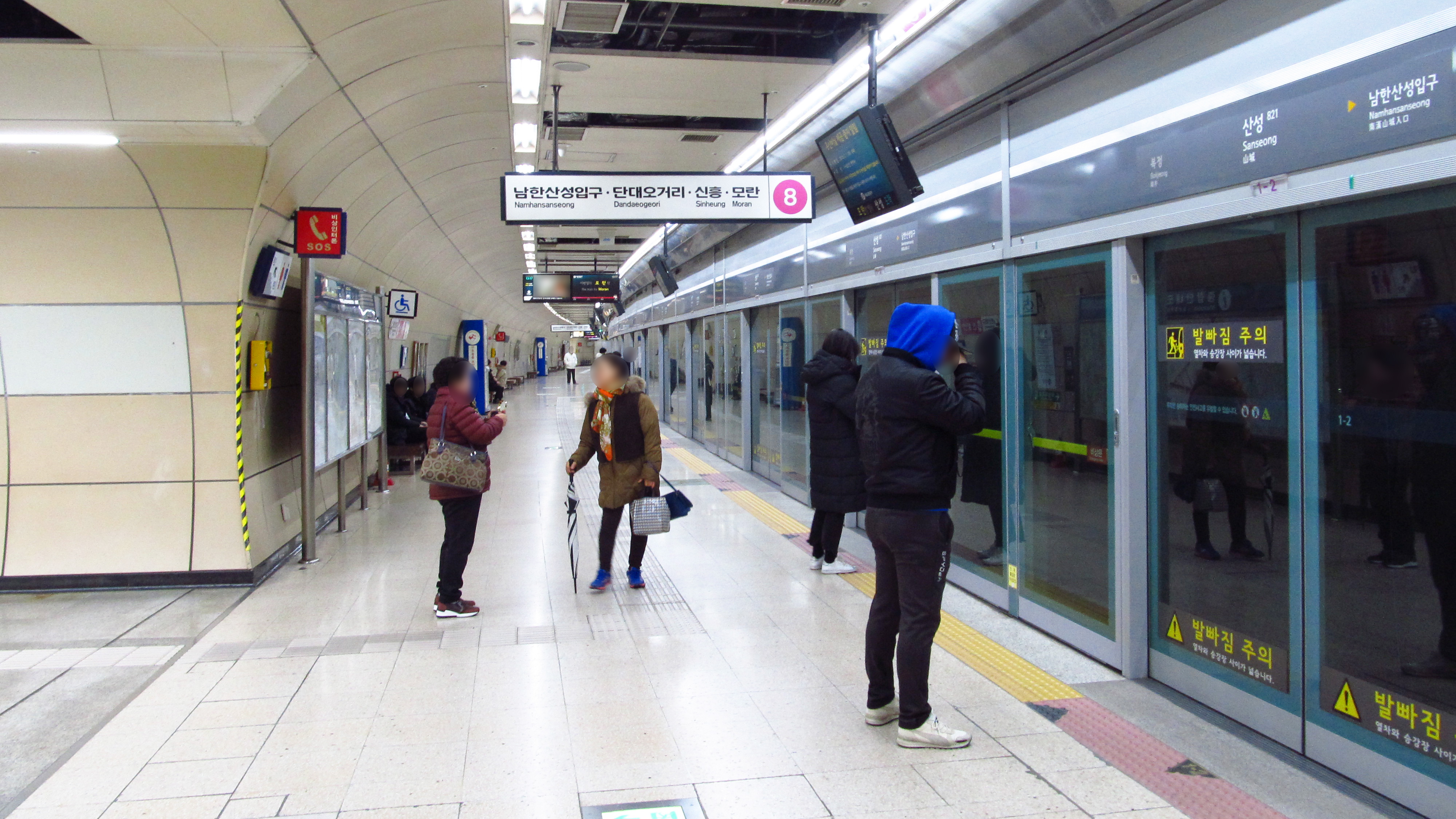

Korean name
- Hangul: 산성역
- Hanja: 山城驛
- Revised Romanization: Sanseong-nyeok
- McCune–Reischauer: Sansŏng-nyŏk

General information
- Location: 7 Sinheung 2-dong, Sujeong-gu, Seongnam-si, Gyeonggi-do
- Operated by: Seoul Metro
- Line(s): Line 8
- Platforms: 2
- Tracks: 2

Construction
- Structure type: Underground

Key dates
- November 23, 1996: Line 8 opened

Sanseong station is a railway station on Seoul Subway Line 8.

== Station layout ==
Namwirye ↑
| N/B
↓ Namhansanseong

Northbound	← ● Line 8 toward Byeollae
Southbound	● Line 8 toward Moran →

Preceding station	Seoul Metropolitan Subway	Following station
Namwirye towards Byeollae	Line 8	Namhansanseong towards Moran
