= Donggureung station =

Metro station in Guri, South Korea

| 동구릉; Donggureung |
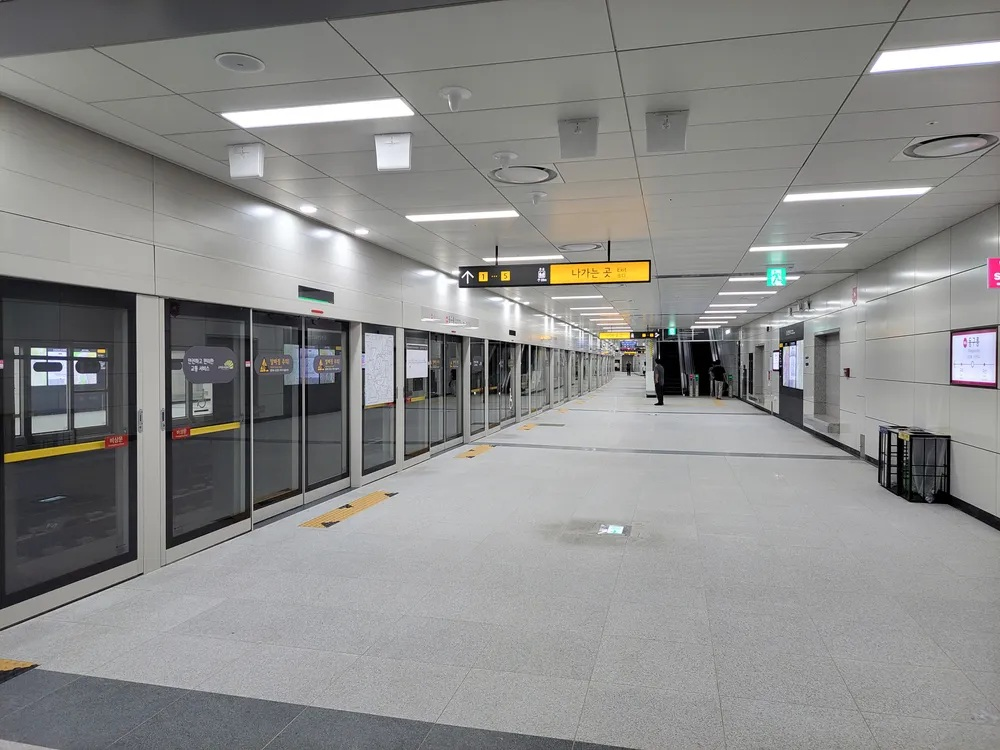
- Donggureung station's platform

Korean name
- Hangul: 동구릉역
- Hanja: 東九陵驛
- Revised Romanization: Donggureung-yeok
- McCune–Reischauer: Tonggurŭng-yŏk

General information
- Location: Inchang-dong, Guri; Gyeonggi Province
- Operator: Guri Urban Corporation
- Line: Line 8
- Platforms: 2
- Tracks: 2

Construction
- Structure type: Underground

Key dates
- August 10, 2024: Line 8 opened
Location

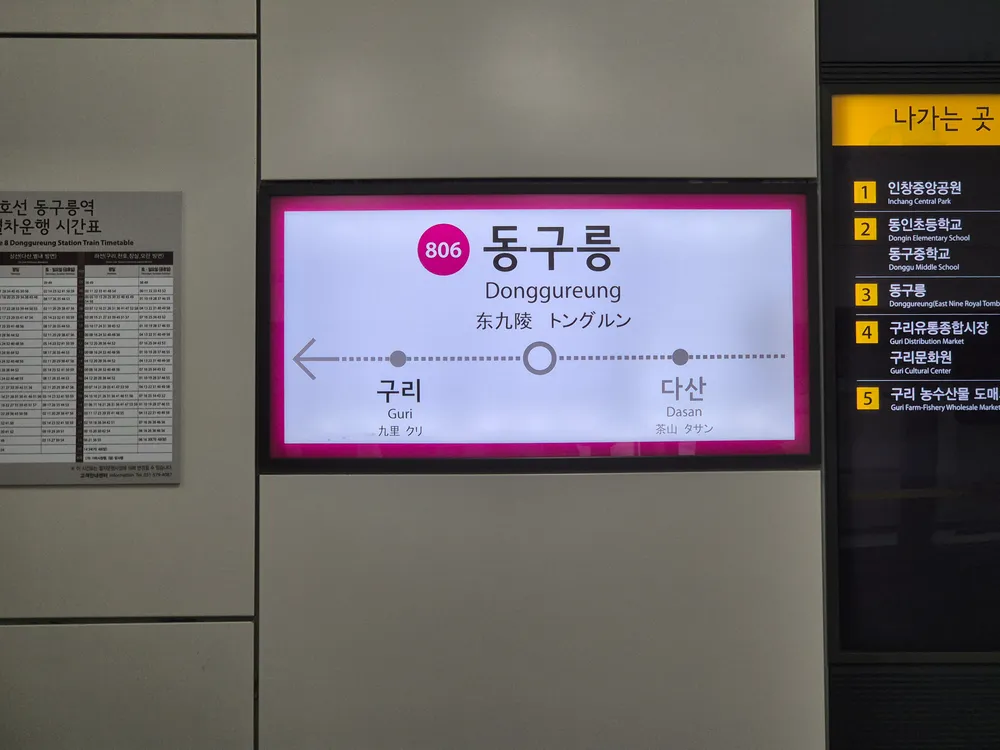
Donggureung station's nameplate

Donggureung station is a subway station on Line 8 of the Seoul Metropolitan Subway system.

== History ==
- August 10, 2024 - Opened for service as part of the extension of Line 8 from Amsa to Byeollae.

== Station layout ==
Dasan ↑
S/B | | N/B
↓ Guri

| Northbound | ← ● Line 8 toward Byeollae |
| Southbound | ● Line 8 toward Moran → |

| Preceding station | Seoul Metropolitan Subway | Following station |
|---|---|---|
| Dasan towards Byeollae | Line 8 | Guri towards Moran |
