= Wirye Line =

Tram line in Seoul, South Korea

Overview
- Native name: 서울 경전철 위례선 (慰禮線)
- Status: Under construction
- Termini: Macheon; Bokjeong / Namwirye
- Stations: 12

History
- Planned opening: 26 December 2026

Technical
- Line length: 5.44 km (3.38 mi)
- Track gauge: 1.435 mm

The Wirye Line (Korean: 위례선; Hanja: 慰禮線) is a future tram line in Seoul, South Korea serving Wirye New Town. Construction is planned to begin on 5 December 2022 and the line is scheduled to be opened in 26 December 2026, with a projected cost of ₩261.4 billion (US$194.4 million). It will be the first tram line to run in Seoul since the closure of the city's tram system in 1968. The line will be standard-gauge and will use trams supplied by Hyundai Rotem and Woojin, with battery-based propulsion and onboard fuel cells providing electrical power.

== Stations ==
=== Main Line ===
Station; Number	Station Name; English	Station Name; Hangul	Station Name; Hanja	Transfer	Distance in km	Total; Distance	Location	
W01	Macheon	마천	馬川	Seoul Subway Line 5			Seoul	Songpa-gu
W02	Bugwirye	북위례	北慰禮				Seoul	Songpa-gu
W03	Wiryesol	위례솔	慰禮솔				Seoul	Songpa-gu
W04	Deoksu High School	덕수고등학교	德壽高等學校				Seoul	Songpa-gu
W05	Wirye Lake Park	위례호수공원	慰禮湖水公園				Seoul	Songpa-gu
W06	Wiryebyeol	위례별	慰禮별				Seoul	Songpa-gu
W07	Wirye Jungang Square	위례중앙광	慰禮中央廣場	Wirye–Sinsa Line			Seoul	Songpa-gu
W08	Wirye History Park	위례역사공원	慰禮歷史公園	Branch line			Seoul	Songpa-gu
W11	Wirye Smart City	위례스마트시티	慰禮스마트시티				Seoul	Songpa-gu
W12	Bokjeong	복정	福井	Suin–Bundang Line			Seoul	Songpa-gu

=== Branch line ===
Station; Number	Station Name; English	Station Name; Hangul	Station Name; Hanja	Transfer	Distance in km	Total; Distance	Location	
W08	Wirye History Park	위례역사공원	慰禮歷史公園	Main line			Seoul	Songpa-gu
W09	Wirye Tram Square	위례트램스퀘어	慰禮트램스퀘어				Gyeonggi	Seongnam
W10	Namwirye	남위례	南慰禮	Seoul Subway Line 8			Gyeonggi	Seongnam
