= Sujin station =

Metro station in Seongnam, South Korea

Coordinates: 37°26′15″N 127°08′27″E

수진; Sujin
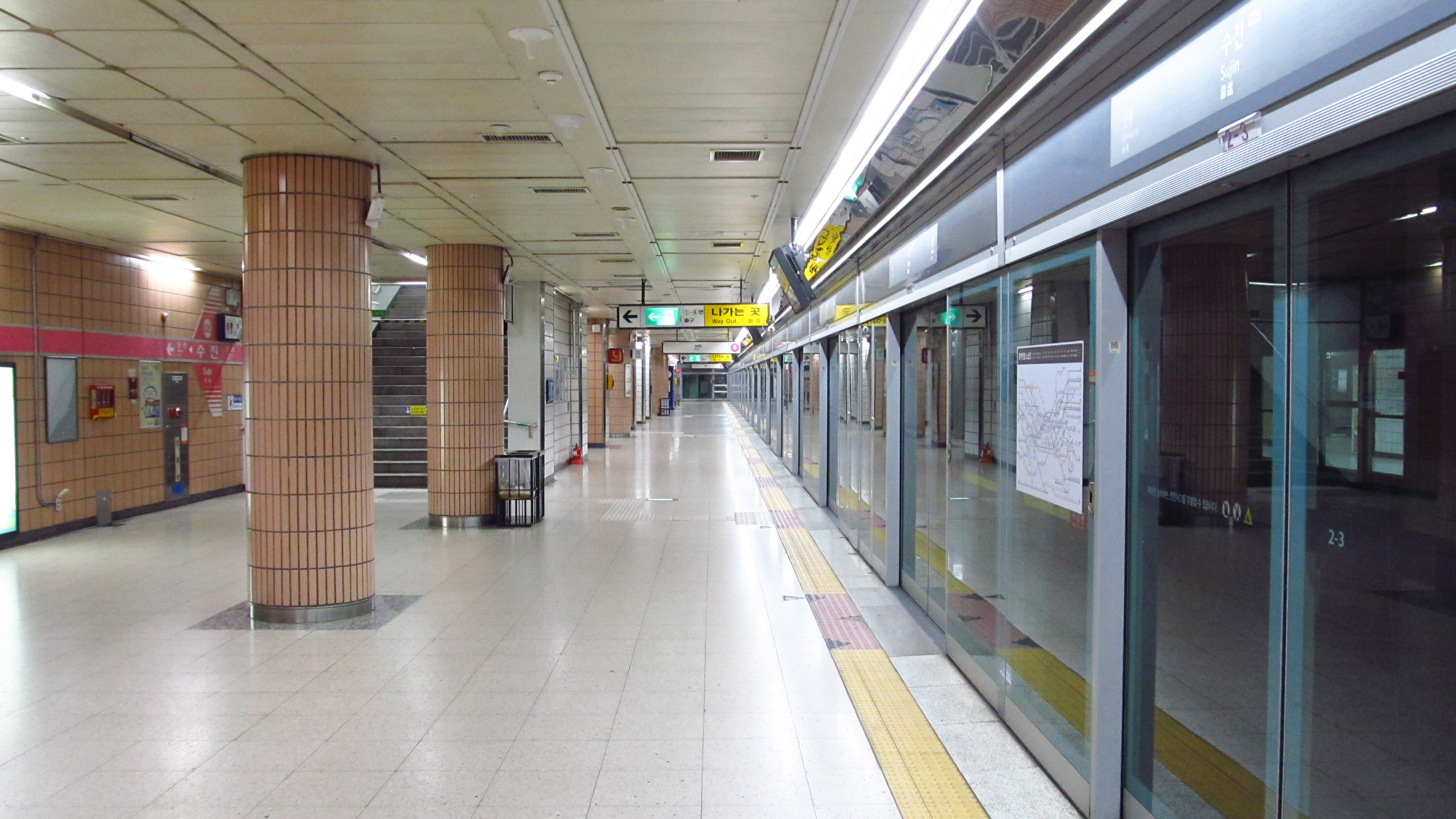

Korean name
- Hangul: 수진역
- Hanja: 壽進驛
- Revised Romanization: Sujin-yeok
- McCune–Reischauer: Sujin-yŏk

General information
- Location: 2204 Sujin 1-dong, Sujeong-gu, Seongnam-si, Gyeonggi-do
- Operated by: Seoul Metro
- Line(s): Line 8
- Platforms: 2
- Tracks: 2

Construction
- Structure type: Underground

Key dates
- November 23, 1996: Line 8 opened

Sujin Station is a railway station on Seoul Subway Line 8.

== Station layout ==
Sinheung ↑
| N/B
↓ Moran

Northbound	← ● Line 8 toward Byeollae
Southbound	● Line 8 toward Moran →

Preceding station	Seoul Metropolitan Subway	Following station
Sinheung towards Byeollae	Line 8	Moran Terminus
