= Dasan station =

Metro station in Namyangju, South Korea

| 다산; Dasan |
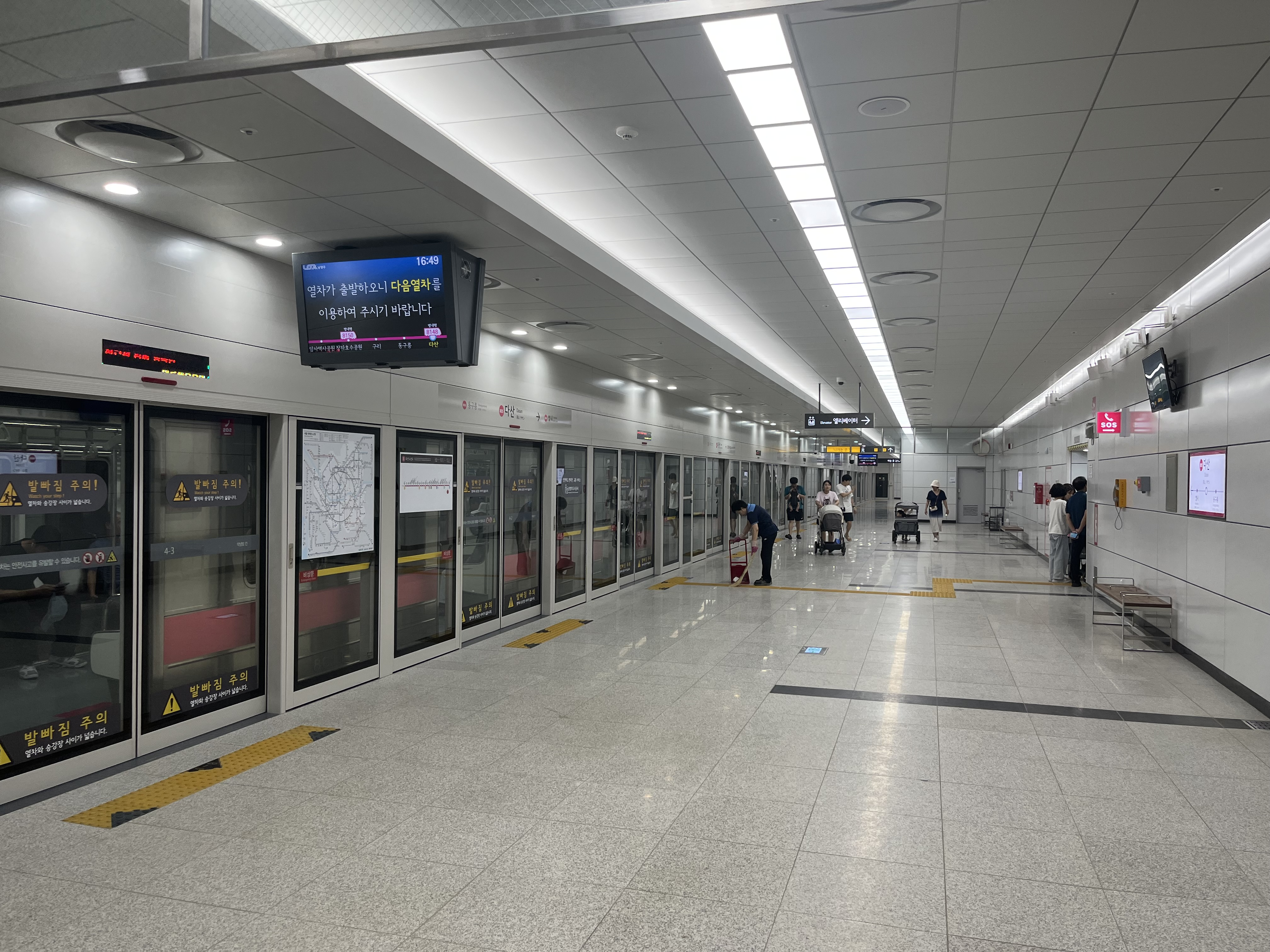
- Dasan station's platform

Korean name
- Hangul: 다산역
- Hanja: 茶山驛
- RR: Dasan-yeok
- MR: Tasan-yŏk

General information
- Location: Dasan-dong, Namyangju; Gyeonggi Province
- Coordinates: 37.6242°N 127.1498°E
- Operator: Namyangju City Urban Corporation
- Line: Line 8
- Platforms: 2
- Tracks: 2

Construction
- Structure type: Underground

Key dates
- August 10, 2024: Line 8 opened
Location

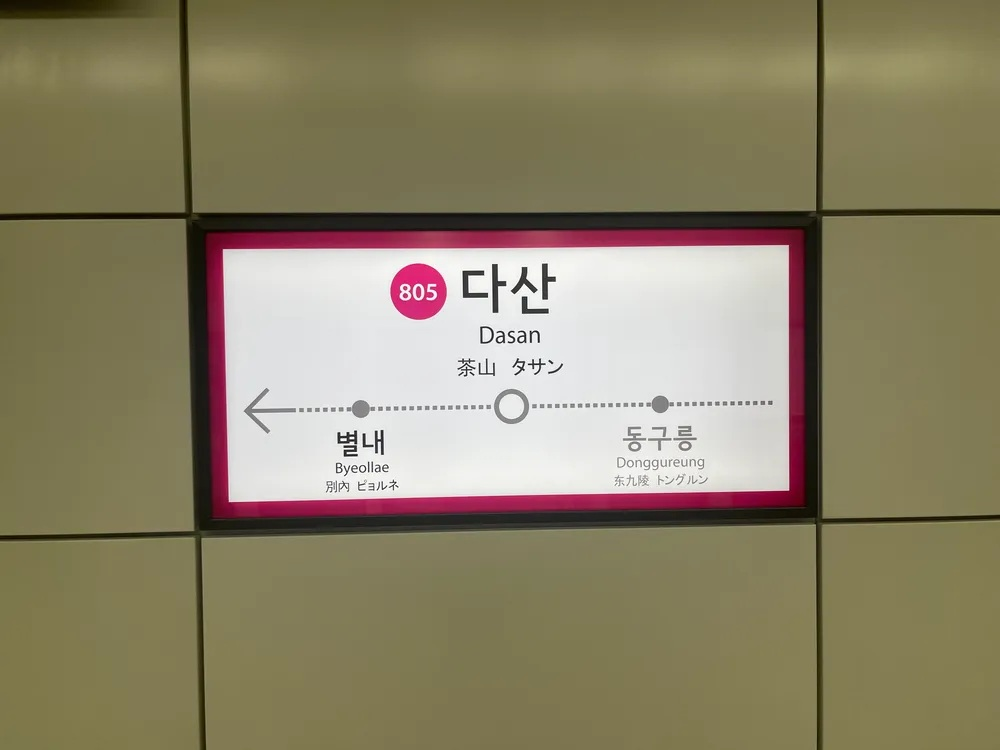
Dasan station's nameplate

Dasan station is a subway station on Line 8 of the Seoul Metropolitan Subway system.

== History ==
- August 10, 2024 - Opened for service as part of the extension of Line 8 from Amsa to Byeollae.

== Station layout ==
Byeollae ↑
S/B | | N/B
↓ Donggureung

| Northbound | ← ● Line 8 toward Byeollae |
| Southbound | ● Line 8 toward Moran → |

| Preceding station | Seoul Metropolitan Subway | Following station |
|---|---|---|
| Byeollae Terminus | Line 8 | Donggureung towards Moran |
