= Wirye =

Planned community in South Korea

Wirye New Town (Korean: 위례신도시) is a planned community in Songpa District, Seoul and Gyeonggi Province. It is named after Wiryeseong.

== Transportation ==
- Bokjeong station of and of
- Namwirye station of
- Geoyeo station of
- Wirye–Sinsa Line (planned)
- Wirye Line (planned)
