= Gachon University station =

Metro station in Seongnam, South Korea

Coordinates: 37°26′52″N 127°07′37″E

가천대; Gachon Univ.
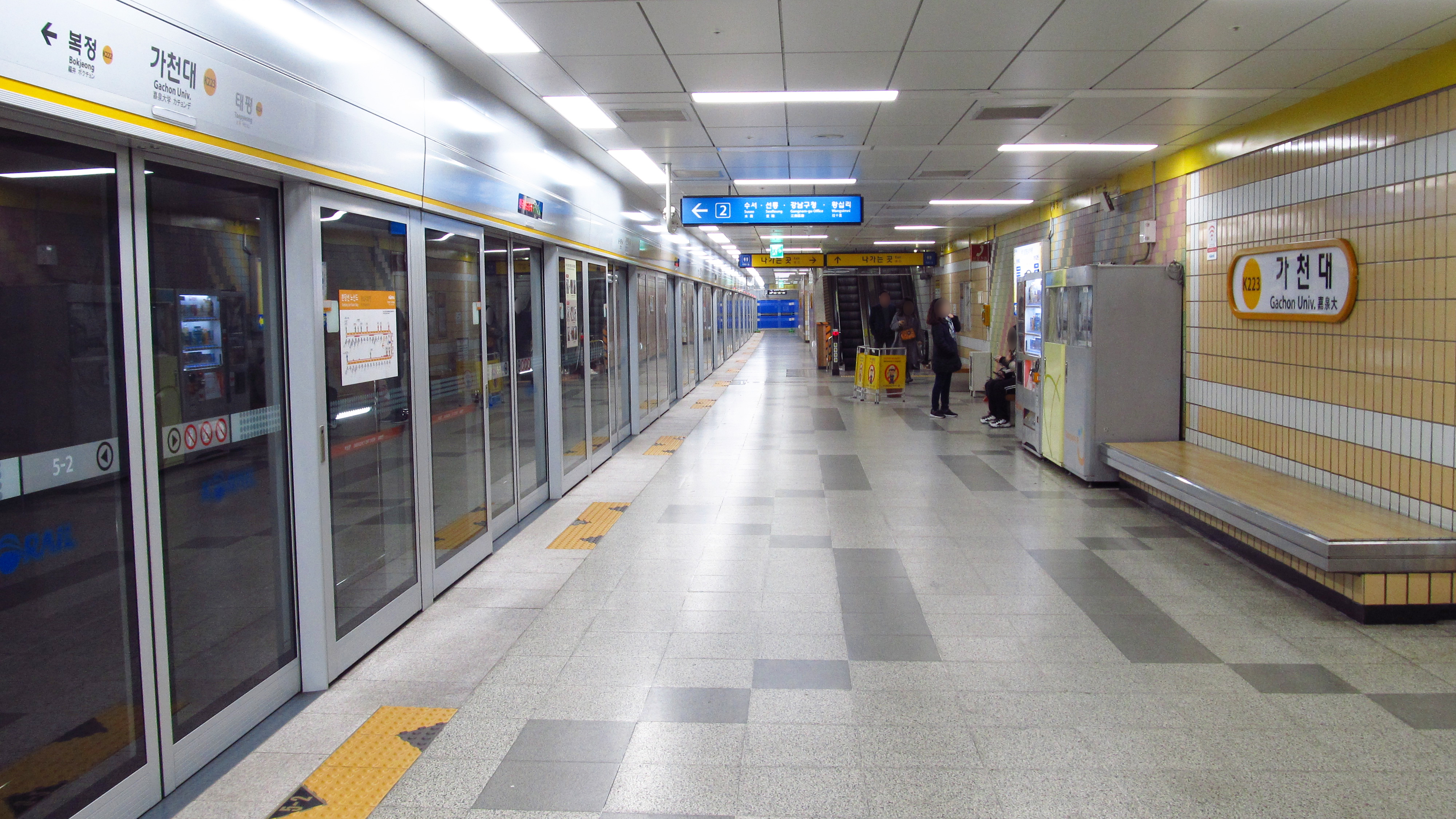

Korean name
- Hangul: 가천대역
- Hanja: 嘉泉大驛
- Revised Romanization: Gacheondae-yeok
- McCune–Reischauer: Kach'ŏndae-yŏk

General information
- Location: 5113–9 Taepyeong-dong, Sujeong-gu, Seongnam-si, Gyeonggi-do
- Operator: Korail
- Line: Suin–Bundang Line
- Platforms: 2
- Tracks: 2

Construction
- Structure type: Underground

Key dates
- 1 September 1994: Suin–Bundang Line opened
Location

Gachon University Station (formerly Kyungwon Univ. Station) is a station on the Suin–Bundang Line between Bokjeong and Taepyeong. It serves the nearby Global campus of Gachon University. On 28 December 2011, Gachon Univ. Station was renamed from Kyungwon Univ. Station.

== Vicinity ==
- Exit 1 : Gachon University
- Exit 2 : West Seongnam Elementary School
- Exit 3 : Taepyeong Middle School
- Exit 4 : Gachon Univ. EX-HUB (To Pangyo)
- Exit 5 : Gachon Univ. EX-HUB (To Songpa)

Preceding station	Seoul Metropolitan Subway	Following station
Bokjeong towards Cheongnyangni	Suin–Bundang Line	Taepyeong towards Incheon
