= Taepyeong station =

Metro station in Seongnam, South Korea

태평; Taepyeong
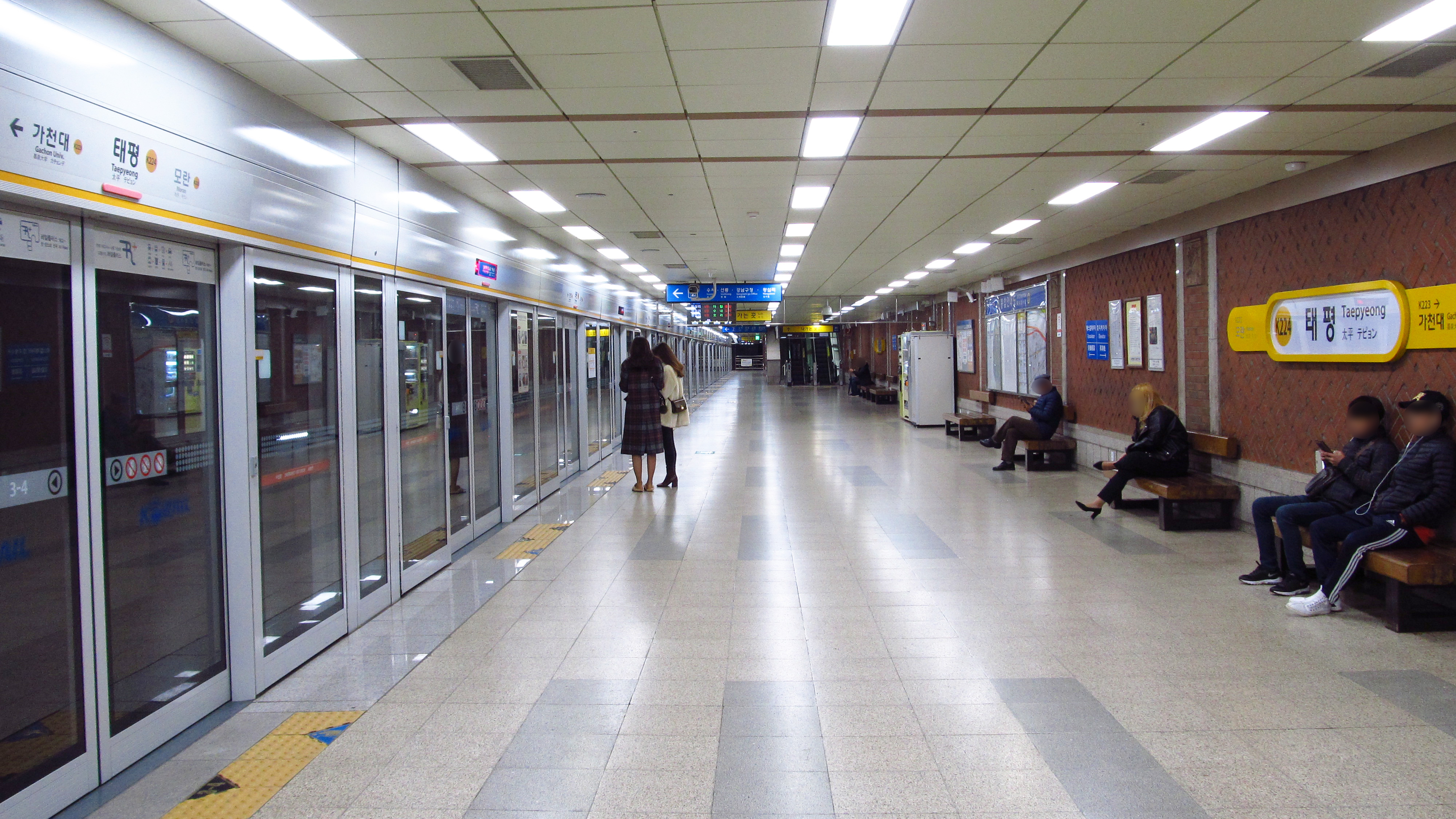
- Station platform

Korean name
- Hangul: 태평역
- Hanja: 太平驛
- Revised Romanization: Taepyeong-yeok
- McCune–Reischauer: T'aep'yŏng-yŏk

General information
- Location: 2997 Sujin 2-dong, Sujeong-gu, Seongnam-si, Gyeonggi-do
- Coordinates: 37°26′22″N 127°07′41″E
- Operator: Korail
- Line: Suin–Bundang Line
- Platforms: 2
- Tracks: 2

Construction
- Structure type: Underground

Key dates
- September 1, 1994: Suin–Bundang Line opened
Location

Taepyeong Station is a station on the Suin–Bundang Line between Gachon University and Moran Station. Located in central Seongnam, it is also in proximity of the Tancheon and Seoul Air Base.

Preceding station	Seoul Metropolitan Subway	Following station
Gachon University towards Cheongnyangni	Suin–Bundang Line	Moran towards Incheon
