= Sujeong District =

District of Seongnam, South Korea

Coordinates: 37.450377°N 127.145833°E

- Non-autonomous District
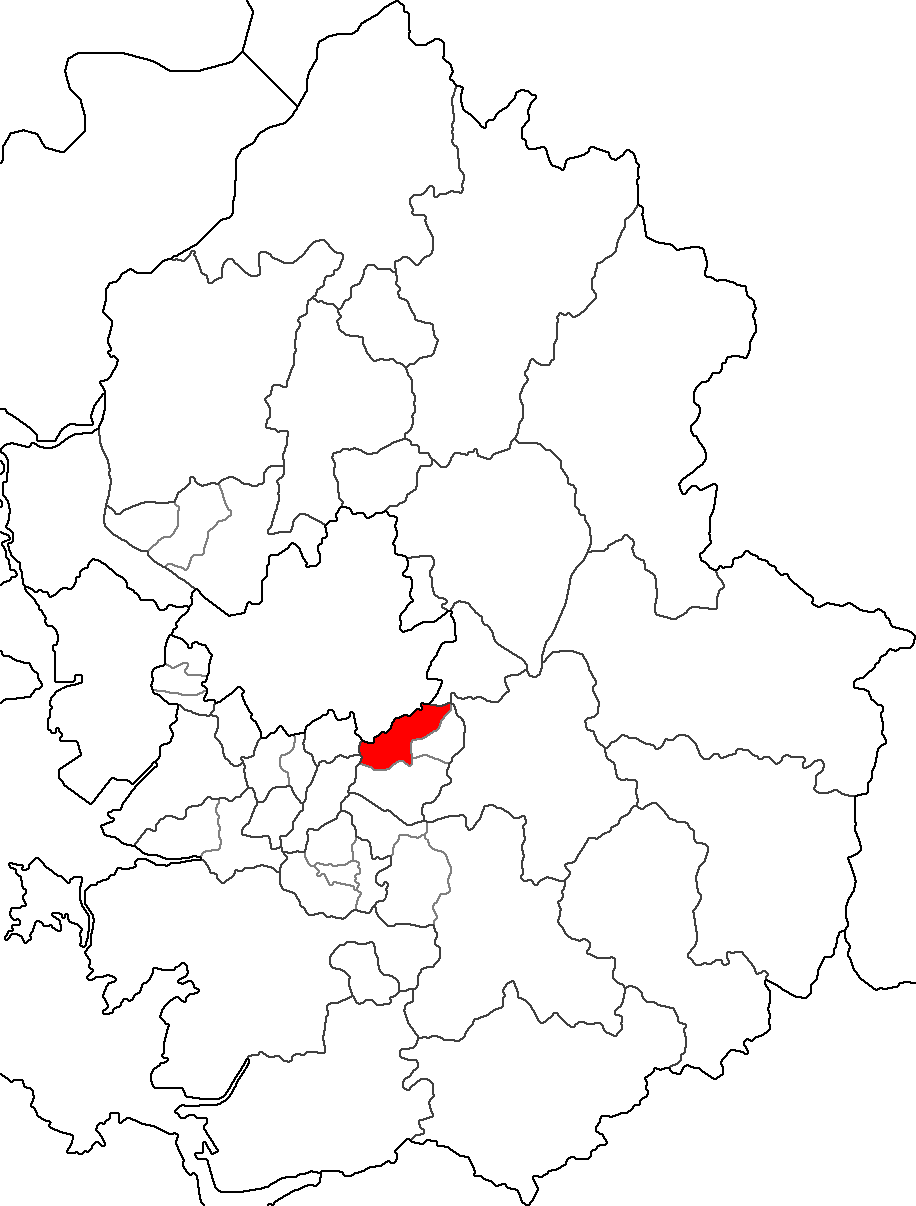
- Country: South Korea
- Region: Sudogwon (Gijeon)
- Province: Gyeonggi
- City: Seongnam
- Administrative divisions: 17 dong

Population
  - Dialect: Seoul
- Website: Sujeong-gu Office

Korean name
- Hangul: 수정구
- Hanja: 壽井區
- RR: Sujeong-gu
- MR: Sujŏng-gu

Sujeong District (Korean: 수정구) is a district (gu) in Seongnam, Gyeonggi Province, South Korea.

== Dong ==
Sinheung-dong	신흥동
Taepyeong-dong	태평동
Sujin-dong	수진동
Dandae-dong	단대동
Sanseong-dong	산성동
Yangji-dong	양지동
Bokjeong-dong	복정동
Changgok-dong	창곡동 (merged to Bokjeong-dong)
Sinchon-dong	신촌동
Oya-dong	오야동 (merged to Sinchon-dong)
Simgok-dong	심곡동 (merged to Sinchon-dong)
Godeung-dong	고등동
Sangjeok-dong	상적동 (merged to Godeung-dong)
Dunjeon-dong	둔전동 (merged to Godeung-dong)
Siheung-dong	시흥동
Geumto-dong	금토동 (merged to Siheung-dong)
Sasong-dong	사송동 (merged to Siheung-dong)

== Stations (excludes Bokjeong station) ==
=== Seoul Subway Line 8 ===
- 821 Sanseong
- 822 Namhansanseong (before 1998:Dandae)
- 823 Dandaeogeori
- 824 Sinheung
- 825 Sujin
- 826 Moran

=== Bundang Line ===
- K223 Gachon Univ.
- K224 Taepyeong
- K225 Moran

== Universities ==
- Gachon University
- Dong Seoul College

== Other schools ==
- Seoul International School

== Military facilities ==
- Seoul Air Base (K-16)
