= Galmae station =

Metro station in South Korea

갈매; Galmae
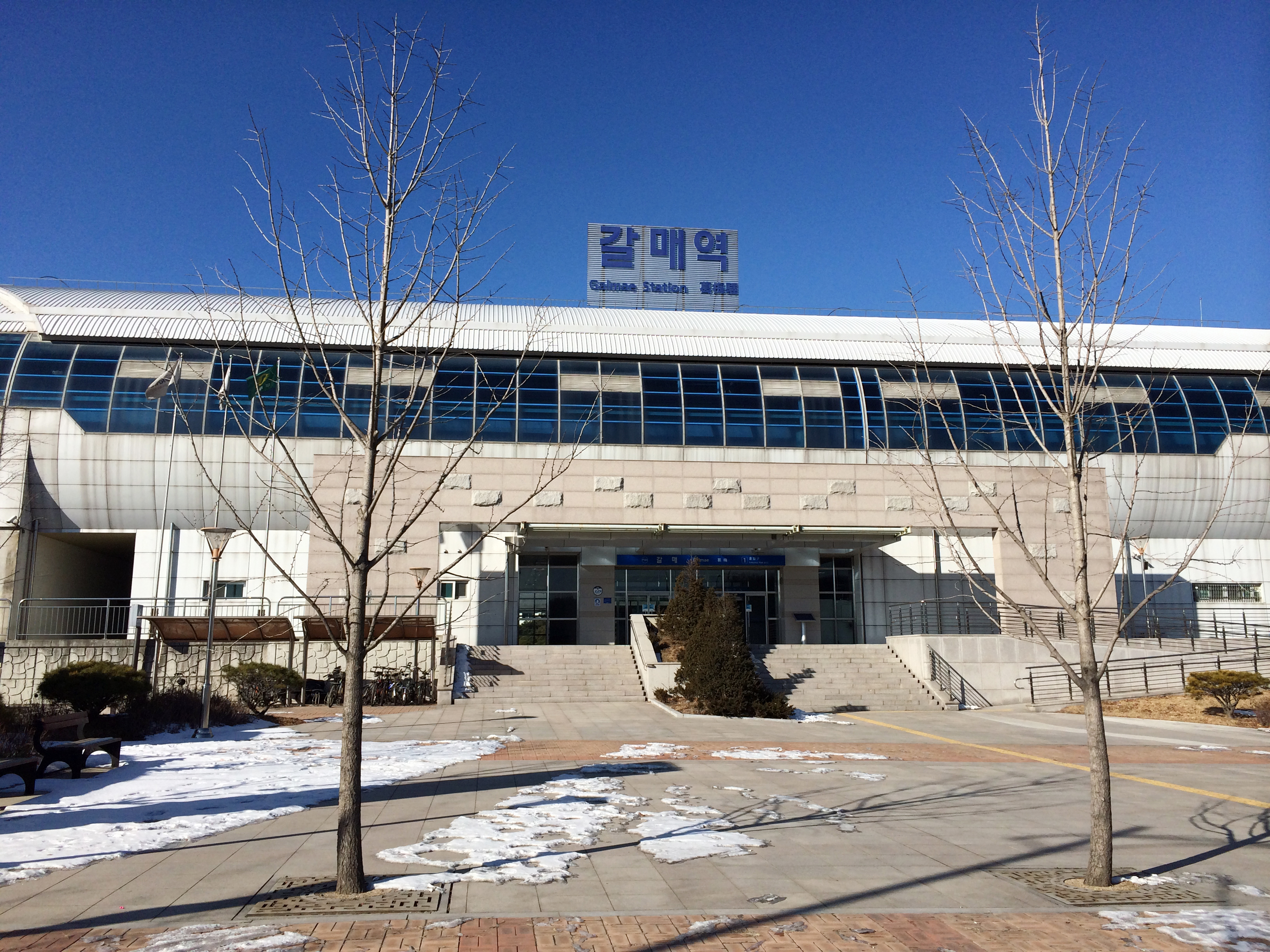

Korean name
- Hangul: 갈매역
- Hanja: 葛梅驛
- Revised Romanization: Galmae-yeok
- McCune–Reischauer: Kalmae-yŏk

General information
- Location: 520-39 Galmae-dong, 229 Gyeongchunbungno, Guri-si, Gyeonggi-do
- Coordinates: 37.634135°N 127.114803°E
- Operator: Korail
- Line: Gyeongchun Line
- Platforms: 2
- Tracks: 2
- Connections: Bus Terminal

Construction
- Structure type: Aboveground

History
- Opened: December 21, 2010

Services
Preceding station	Seoul Metropolitan Subway	Following station
Sinnae towards Cheongnyangni or Kwangwoon University	Gyeongchun Line	Byeollae towards Chuncheon
Sangbong towards Cheongnyangni	Gyeongchun Line Express	Byeollae towards Chuncheon
Location

Galmae station (Korean: 갈매역; Hanja: 葛梅驛) is a railway station of the Gyeongchun Line in Guri-si, Gyeonggi-do.

== Station layout ==
L2; Platforms	Side platform, doors will open on the left
L2; Platforms	Eastbound	Gyeongchun Line Local toward Chuncheon (Byeollae)→ Gyeongchun Line Express toward Chuncheon (Byeollae)→
L2; Platforms	Westbound	← Gyeongchun Line Local toward Cheongnyangni or Kwangwoon Univ. (Sinnae) ← Gyeongchun Line Express toward Cheongnyangni (Sangbong)
L2; Platforms	Side platform, doors will open on the left

L1; Concourse	Lobby	Customer Service, Shops, Vending machines, ATMs

G	Street level	Exit

== Gallery ==
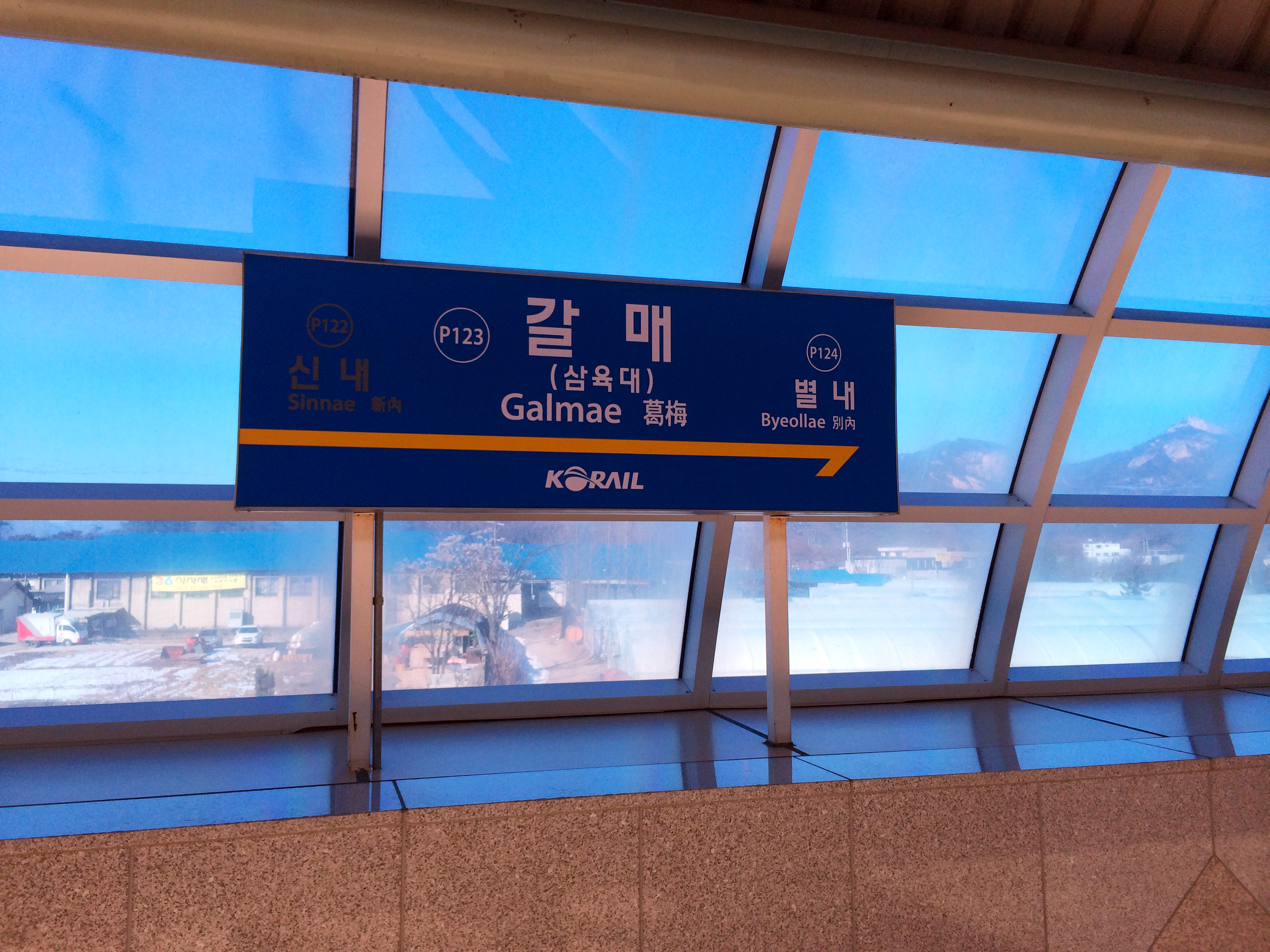
Station sign

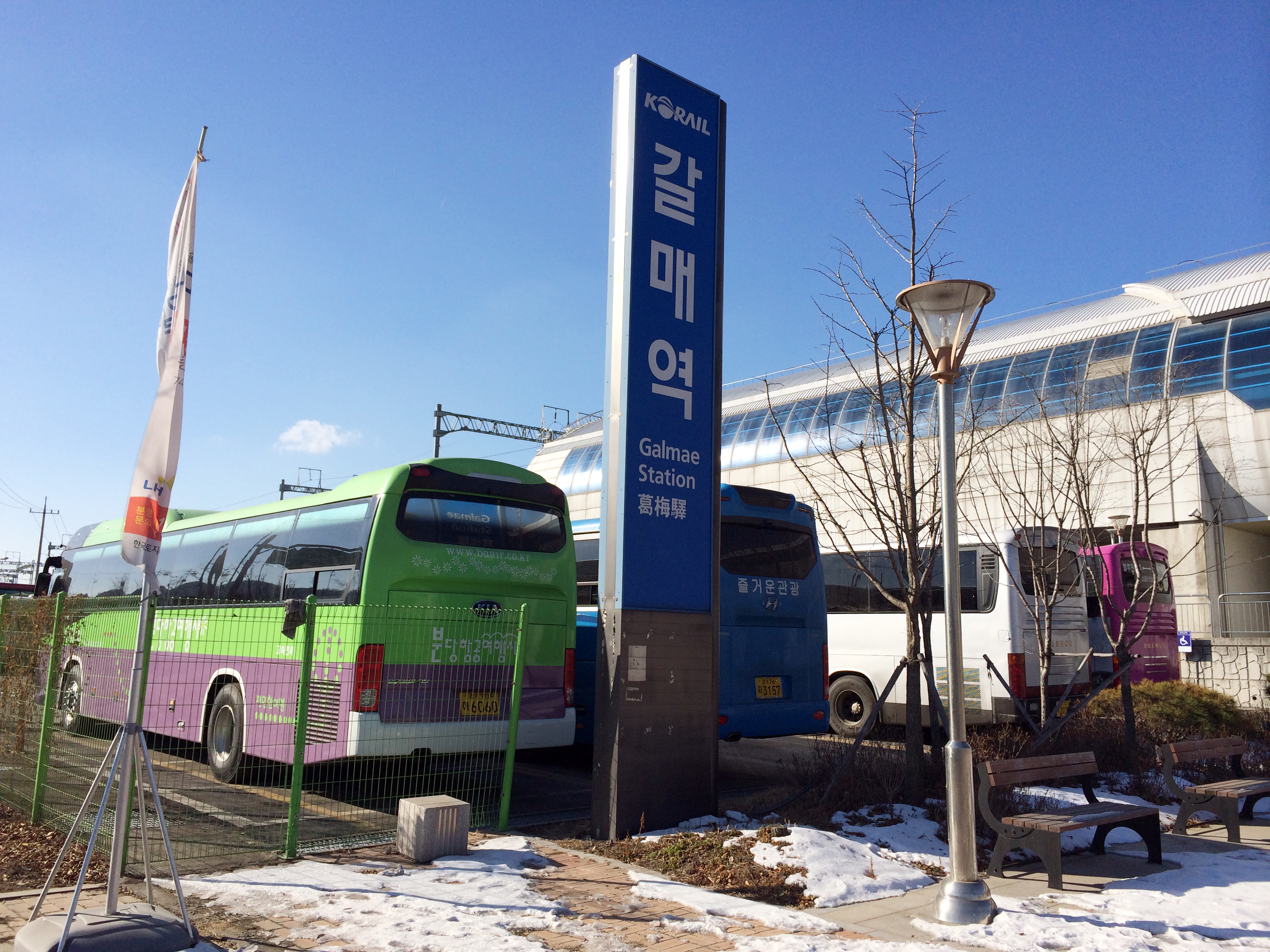
Buses at Galmae station
