= Seoul Subway Line 8 =

Subway line in Gyeonggi-do and Seoul, South Korea

Line 8
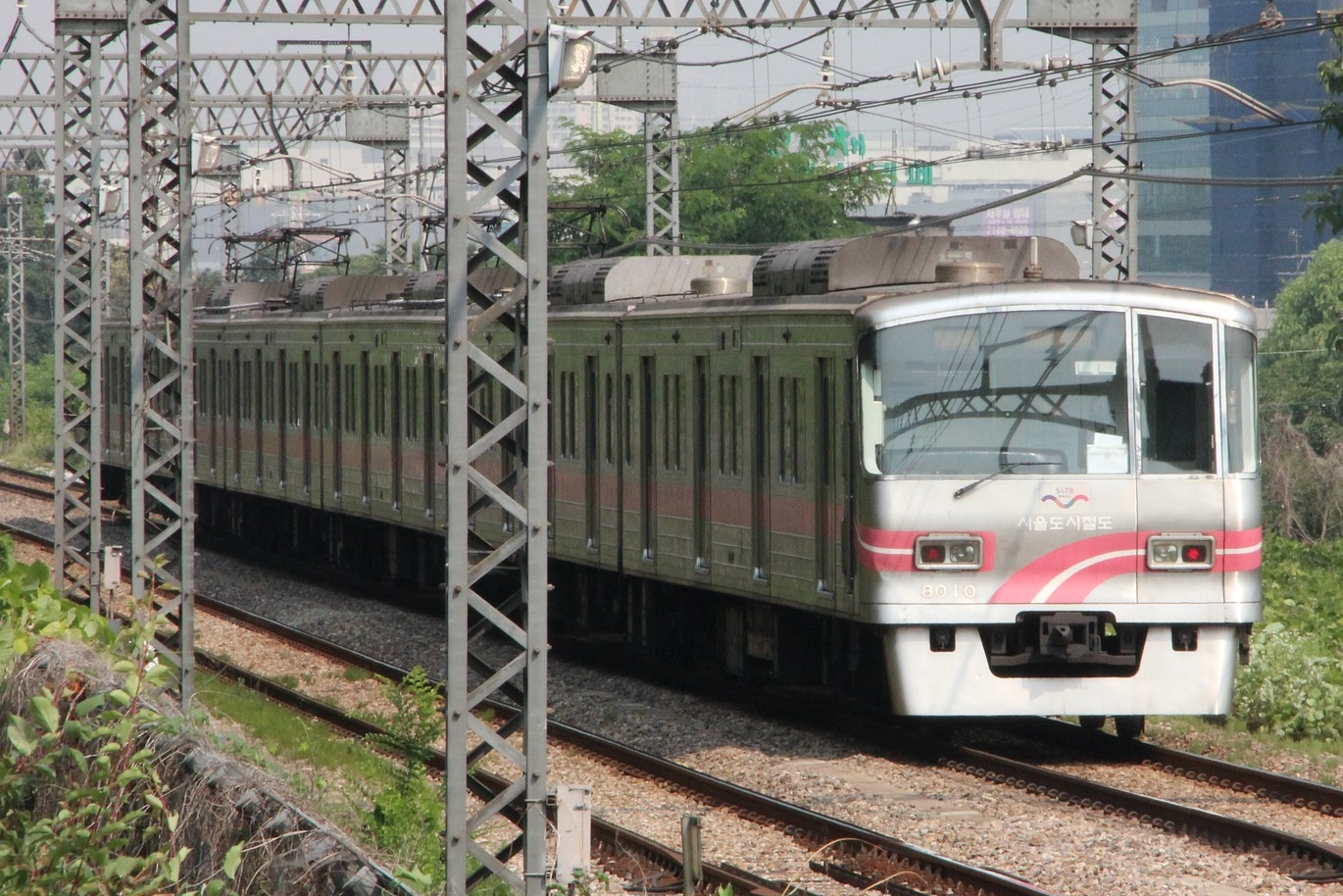

Overview
- Native name: 8호선(八號線); Pal Hoseon
- Status: Operational
- Termini: Byeollae; Moran
- Stations: 25
- Color on map: Pink

Service
- Type: Rapid transit
- System: Seoul Metropolitan Subway
- Operator: Seoul Metro
- Depot: Jamsil
- Daily ridership: 312,005 (2024)
- Ridership: 114.19 million (2024) (▲7.2%)

History
- Opened: 23 November 1996; 29 years ago
- Last extension: 2024

Technical
- Line length: 30.1 km (18.7 mi)
- Num of tracks: 2
- Electrification: 1,500 V DC overhead catenary
Route map
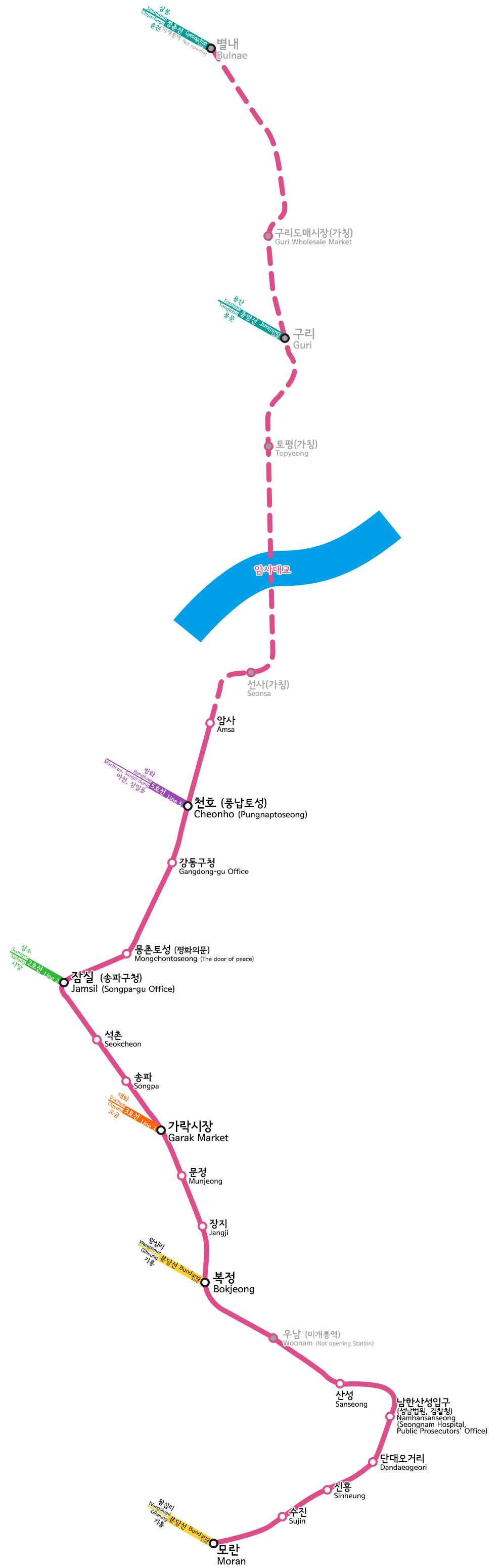

Seoul Subway Line 8 of the Seoul Metropolitan Subway was built from 1990 to 1999 and mainly serves the southeastern parts of Seoul and Seongnam. The first section from Jamsil to Moran opened in 1996, and the second section from Moran to Amsa was opened in July 1999. The line color is rose. In 2019, Line 8 had an annual ridership of 112 million or about 307,000 people per day. At 17.7 km (11.0 mi) in length, Line 8 is the shortest of all heavy rail Seoul Metropolitan Subway lines.

Line 8 uses triangular, pink station signs; it shares its station sign design with Lines 5 and 7 (except in colour). The triangle's apex points in the direction that trains run, with the hypotenuse pointing in the opposite direction. The upper half of the triangle displays the station number, with the Hangul name of the station appearing in the middle and the English and Hanja names in the lower part. An arm projects from the apex to point to the next station, with another arm pointing from the back to the previous station.

In 2014, construction was planned to begin in order to extend the line north of the Han River through Guri station to Byeollae station on the Gyeongchun Line in Namyangju-si, Gyeonggi-do; construction began in October 2015. The extension added 11.37 km (7.06 mi) of line to the already existing 17.7 km (11.0 mi). with operation beginning on August 10, 2024.

Another northern extension is planned to bring the line to ByeollaeByeolgaram station on Seoul Subway Line 4.

The southern end is planned to be extended 3.9 km (2.4 mi) to Pangyo station.

== Stations ==
Station number	Station name English	Station name Hangul	Transfer	Line name	Distance in km	Total distance	Location	
803	ByeollaeByeolgaram (planned)	별내별가람	Seoul Subway Line 4	Line 8 (Byeollae Line)	---	---	Gyeonggi-do	Namyangju-si
804	Byeollae	별내	Gyeongchun Line	Line 8 (Byeollae Line)	---	0.0	Gyeonggi-do	Namyangju-si
805	Dasan	다산		Line 8 (Byeollae Line)	3.0	3.0	Gyeonggi-do	Namyangju-si
806	Donggureung	동구릉		Line 8 (Byeollae Line)	1.8	4.8	Gyeonggi-do	Guri-si
807	Guri	구리	Gyeongui–Jungang Line	Line 8 (Byeollae Line)	1.2	6.0	Gyeonggi-do	Guri-si
808	Jangja Lake Park	장자호수공원		Line 8 (Byeollae Line)	1.8	7.8	Gyeonggi-do	Guri-si
809	Amsa History Park	암사역사공원		Line 8 (Byeollae Line)	3.5	11.3	Seoul	Gangdong-gu
810	Amsa	암사		Line 8	1.1	12.4	Seoul	Gangdong-gu
811	Cheonho (Pungnaptoseong)	천호 (풍납토성)	Seoul Subway Line 5	Line 8	1.3	13.7	Seoul	Gangdong-gu
812	Gangdong-gu Office	강동구청		Line 8	0.9	14.6	Seoul	Gangdong-gu
813	Mongchontoseong (World Peace Gate)	몽촌토성 (평화의문)		Line 8	1.6	16.2	Seoul	Songpa-gu
814	Jamsil (Songpa-gu Office)	잠실 (송파구청)	Seoul Subway Line 2	Line 8	0.8	17.0	Seoul	Songpa-gu
815	Seokchon (Hansol Hospital)	석촌 (한솔병원)	Seoul Subway Line 9	Line 8	1.2	18.2	Seoul	Songpa-gu
816	Songpa	송파		Line 8	0.9	19.1	Seoul	Songpa-gu
817	Garak Market	가락시장	Seoul Subway Line 3	Line 8	0.8	19.9	Seoul	Songpa-gu
818	Munjeong	문정		Line 8	0.9	20.8	Seoul	Songpa-gu
819	Jangji	장지		Line 8	0.9	21.7	Seoul	Songpa-gu
820	Bokjeong	복정	Suin–Bundang Line	Line 8	0.9	22.6	Seoul	Songpa-gu
821	Namwirye	남위례		Line 8	1.6	24.2	Gyeonggi-do	Seongnam-si
822	Sanseong	산성		Line 8	1.1	25.3	Gyeonggi-do	Seongnam-si
823	Namhansanseong (Seongnam Court & Prosecutors' Office)	남한산성입구 (성남법원·검찰청)		Line 8	1.3	26.6	Gyeonggi-do	Seongnam-si
824	Dandaeogeori (Shingu College)	단대오거리 (신구대학교)		Line 8	0.8	27.4	Gyeonggi-do	Seongnam-si
825	Sinheung	신흥		Line 8	0.8	28.2	Gyeonggi-do	Seongnam-si
826	Sujin	수진		Line 8	0.9	29.1	Gyeonggi-do	Seongnam-si
827	Moran	모란	Suin–Bundang Line	Line 8	1.0	30.1	Gyeonggi-do	Seongnam-si

== Ridership ==
Seoul Subway Line 8 Ridership (Note: The ridership is calculated based on boarding and transferring passengers (a+c). The data tallies between the two sources but the Seoul Metro source is more granular. The ridership data is derived from the 서울교통공사 수송실적 (Seoul Metro transport performance) data/report.)
Year	Ridership	Change (%)	Remarks
2026	60,958,624	-	Updated as of June 2026
2025	119,303,336	▲4.5	Highest on record
2024	114,193,830	▲7.2	Phase 3 opening
2023	106,522,000	▲8.8	
2022	97,937,000	▲10.6	
2021	88,547,000	▲2.0	Opening of Namwirye station between Sanseong and Bokjeong
2020	86,820,000	▼22.5	COVID-19 pandemic
2019	112,087,000	▲4.1	
2018	107,720,000	▲4.0	
2017	103,566,000	▲5.0	
2016	98,621,000	▲10.5	
2015	89,238,000	▲0.3	
2014	88,927,000	▲1.4	
2013	87,722,000	▲0.3	
2012	87,491,000	▲1.7	
2011	86,052,000	▲2.0	
2010	84,404,000	▲2.3	
2009	82,480,000	▼1.2	
2008	83,482,000	▲1.9	
2007	81,921,000	▼0.5	
2006	82,302,000	▼1.8	
2005	83,841,000	▼0.8	
2004	84,509,000	▲0.9	
2003	83,745,000	▲0.6	
2002	83,246,000	▲2.8	
2001	80,958,000	▲62.7	
2000	49,768,000	▼16.0	
1999	59,256,000	▲76.2	Phase 2 opening
1998	33,622,000	▲4.1	
1997	32,305,000	-	Line begins service

== See also ==
- Subways in South Korea
- Seoul Metropolitan Rapid Transit Corporation
- Seoul Metropolitan Subway
