= Moran station =

Metro station in Seongnam, South Korea

Coordinates: 37°25′53″N 127°07′47″E

모란; Moran
모란; Moran
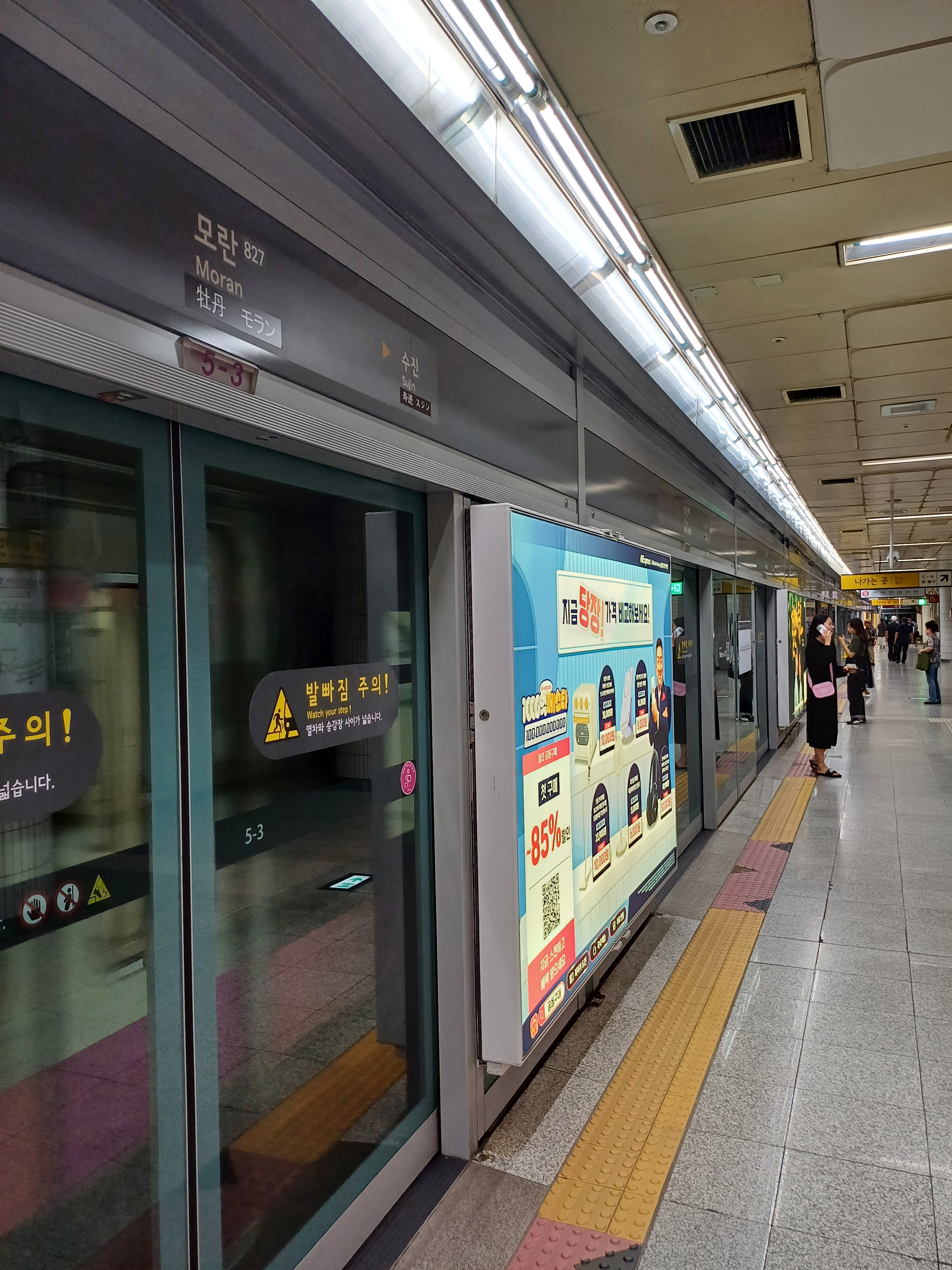
- Line 8 station platform

Korean name
- Hangul: 모란역
- Hanja: 牡丹驛
- Revised Romanization: Moran-yeok
- McCune–Reischauer: Moran-yŏk

General information
- Location: 4518 Sujin 2-dong, Sujeong-gu, Seongnam-si, Gyeonggi-do
- Operator: Seoul Metro; Korail
- Lines: Line 8 Suin–Bundang Line
- Platforms: 4
- Tracks: 4

Construction
- Structure type: Underground

Key dates
- November 23, 1996: Line 8 opened
- September 1, 1994: Suin–Bundang Line opened
Location

Moran Station serves as the southern terminal of Seoul Subway Line 8 and is also a stop on the Suin–Bundang Line. The Moran Market is held near the station during the 4th and 9th days of the month.

== Station layout ==
=== Suin–Bundang Line ===
↑ Taepyeong
2 | | 1
Yatap ↓

Platform 1	● Suin–Bundang Line toward Incheon →
Platform 2	← ● Suin–Bundang Line toward Cheongnyangni

=== Line 8 ===
Sujin ↑
S/B | | N/B
↓ Terminus

Northbound	← ● Line 8 toward Byeollae
Southbound	● Line 8 alighting point only →

== Vicinity ==
- Exit 4: Jungwon-gu Office
- Exit 5: Moran Market
- Exit 9: Seongsu Elementary School
- Exit 11: Pungsaeng Middle & High Schools

== Gallery ==
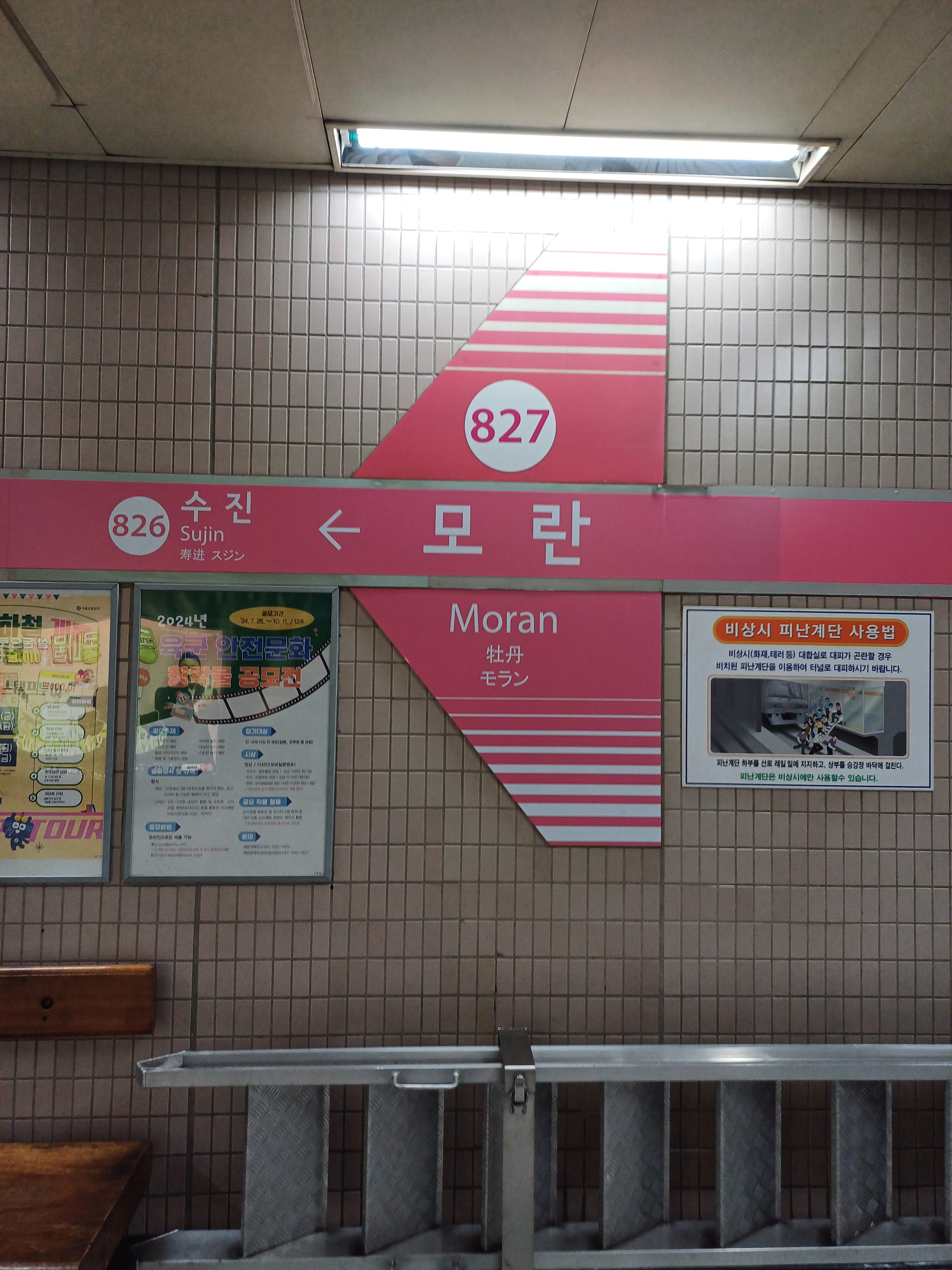
Line 8 station nameplate

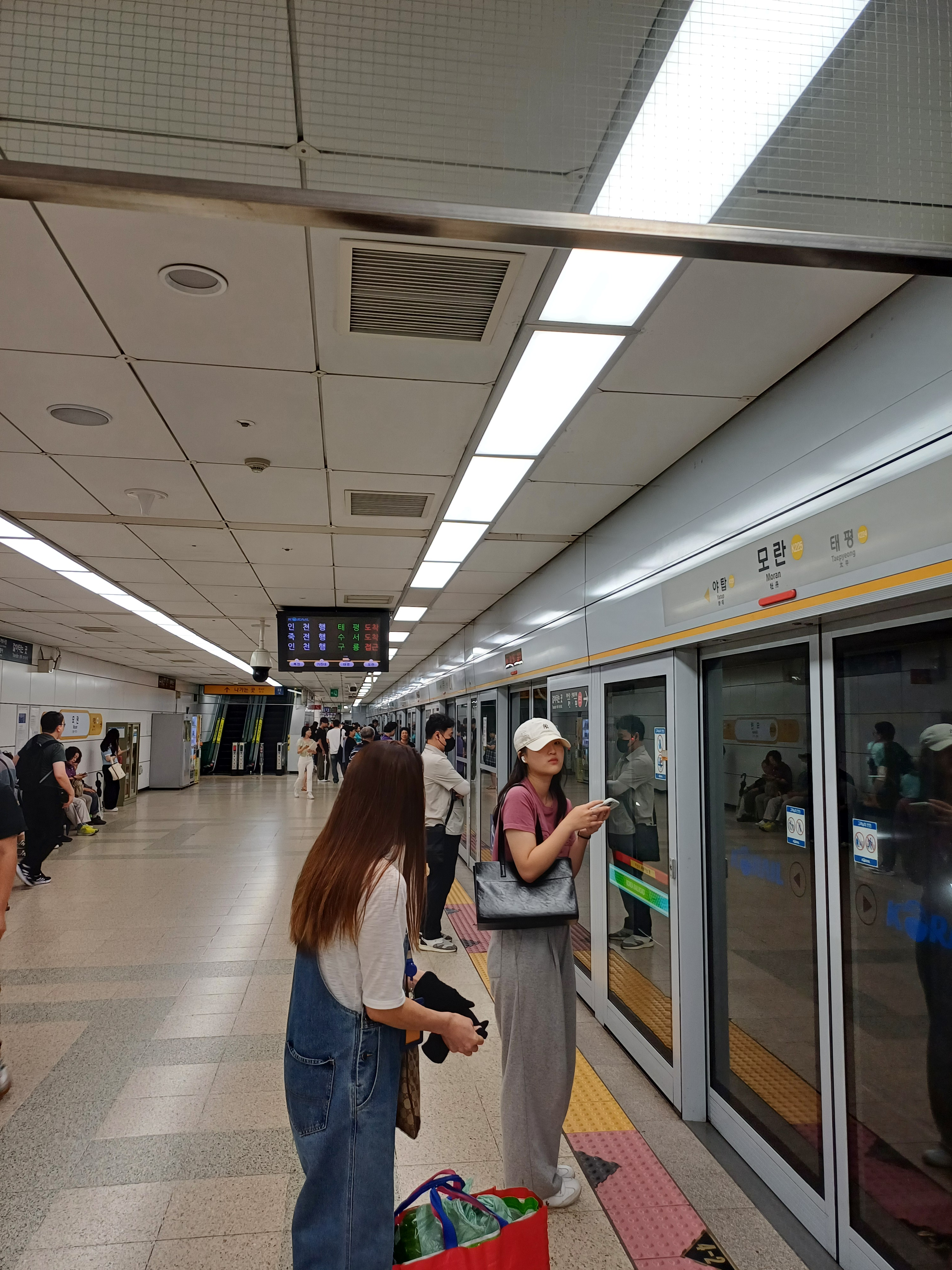
Suin-Bundang Line station platform

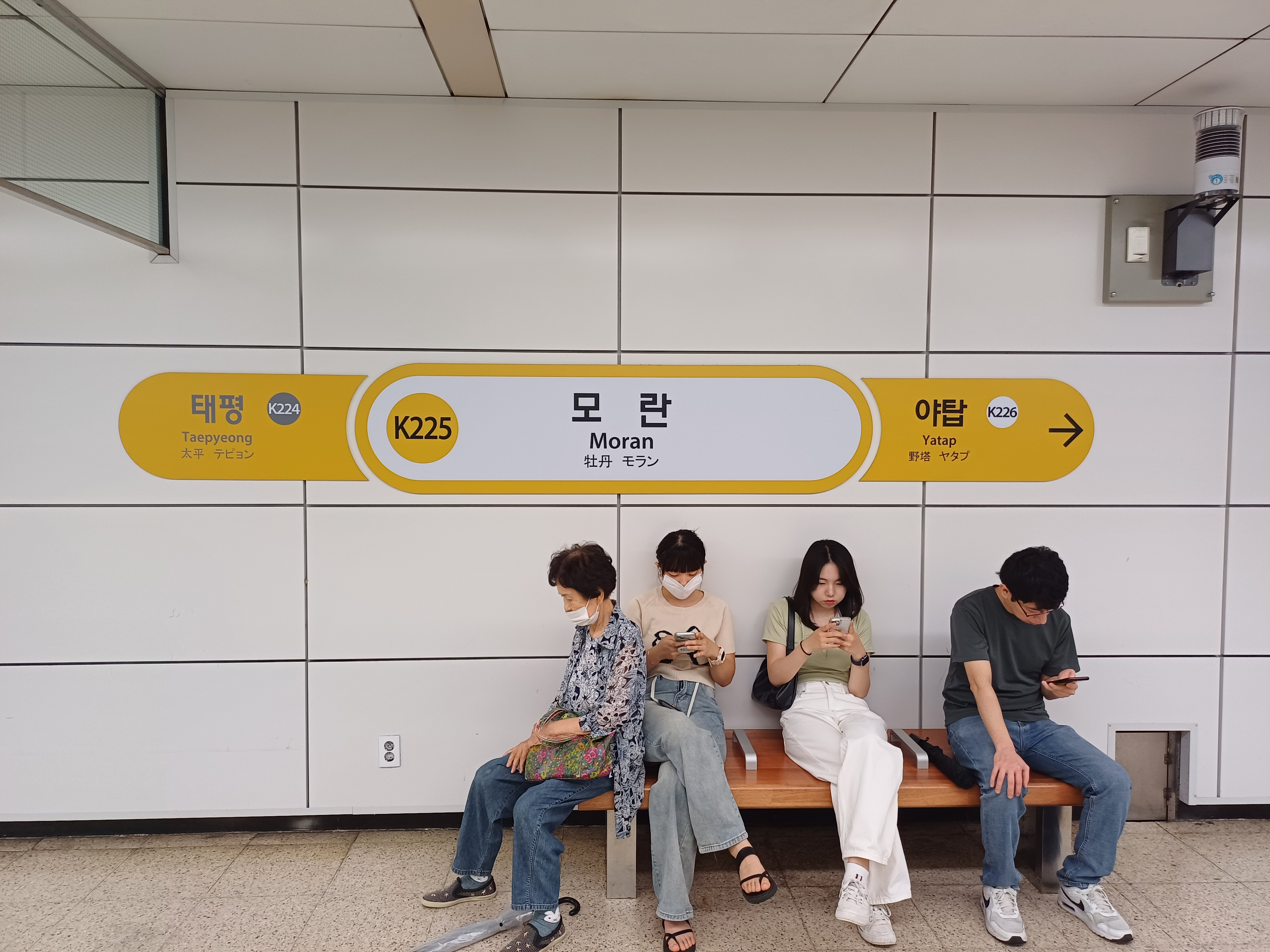
Suin-Bundang Line station nameplate

Preceding station	Seoul Metropolitan Subway	Following station
Sujin towards Byeollae	Line 8	Terminus
Taepyeong towards Cheongnyangni	Suin–Bundang Line	Yatap towards Incheon
