= Byeollae station =

Station of the Seoul Metropolitan Subway

별내; Byeollae
별내 (삼육대학교); Byeollae (Sahmyook Univ.)
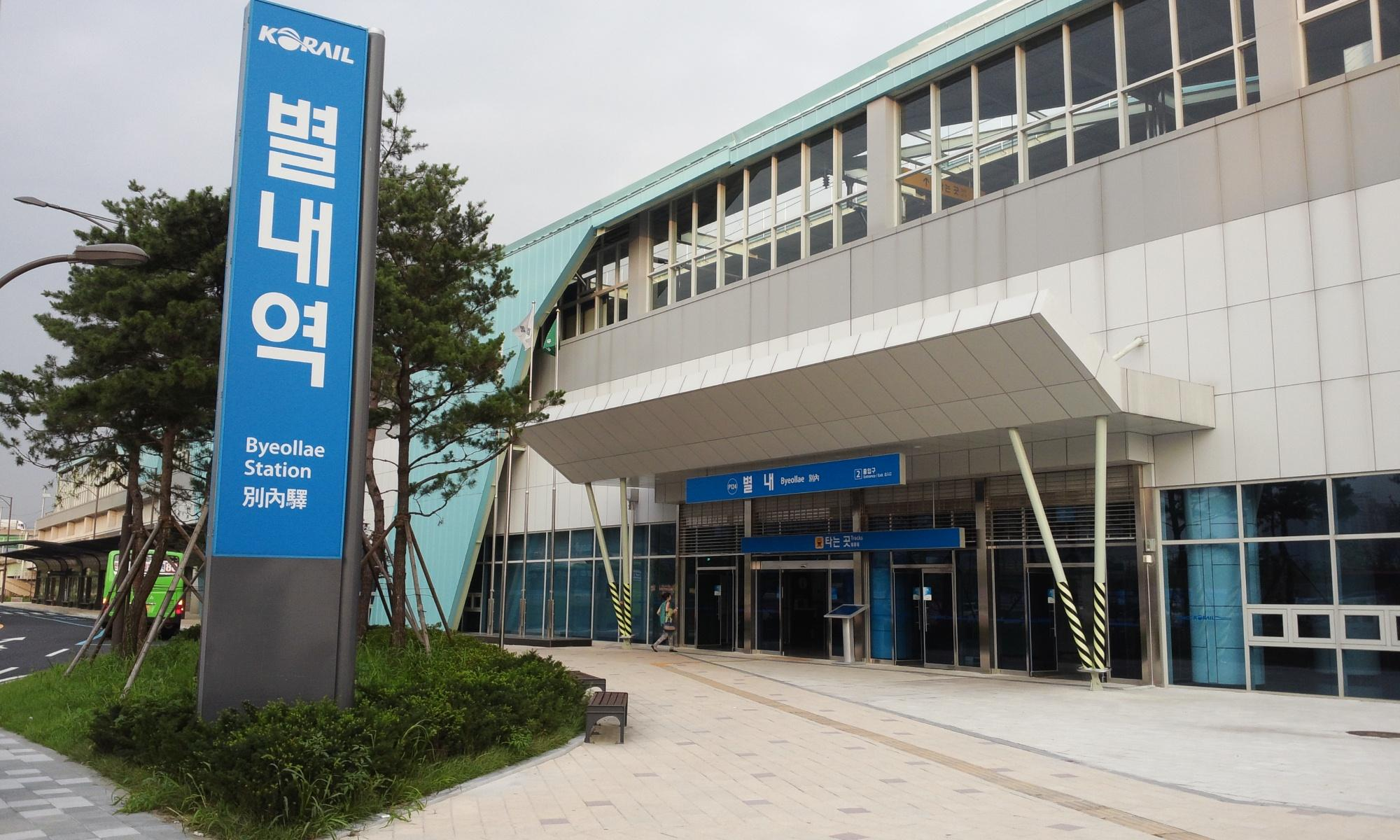
- Byeollae station exit no. 2

Korean name
- Hangul: 별내역
- Hanja: 別內驛
- Revised Romanization: Byeollae-yeok
- McCune–Reischauer: Pyŏllae-yŏk

General information
- Location: 182-5 Byeollae-dong, Namyangju, Gyeonggi-do
- Coordinates: 37.64222°N 127.127208°E
- Operator: Korail; Namyangju City Urban Corporation
- Lines: Line 8 Gyeongchun Line
- Platforms: 2
- Tracks: 2
- Connections: Bus station

Key dates
- December 15, 2012: Gyeongchun Line opened
- August 10, 2024: Line 8 opened

Services
Preceding station	Seoul Metropolitan Subway	Following station
Terminus	Line 8	Dasan towards Moran
Galmae towards Cheongnyangni	Gyeongchun Line	Toegyewon towards Chuncheon
Galmae towards Cheongnyangni or Kwangwoon University	Gyeongchun Line Express	Toegyewon towards Chuncheon
Location

Byeollae station (Korean: 별내역) is a railway station of the Gyeongchun Line that opened in December 2012. It is located at Byeollae-dong, Namyangju, Gyeonggi Province, South Korea. In August 2024, the station became a transfer station when Seoul Subway Line 8 was exteded to this station.

== History ==
- August 10, 2024 - Line 8 platforms opened for service as part of the extension from Amsa.

== Station layout ==
L2; Platforms	Side platform, doors will open on the left
L2; Platforms	Eastbound	Gyeongchun Line toward Chuncheon (Toegyewon) →
L2; Platforms	Westbound	← Gyeongchun Line toward Cheongnyangni or Kwangwoon Univ. (Galmae)
L2; Platforms	Side platform, doors will open on the left

L1; Concourse	Lobby	Customer Service, Shops, Vending machines, ATMs

G	Street level	Exit

== Gallery ==
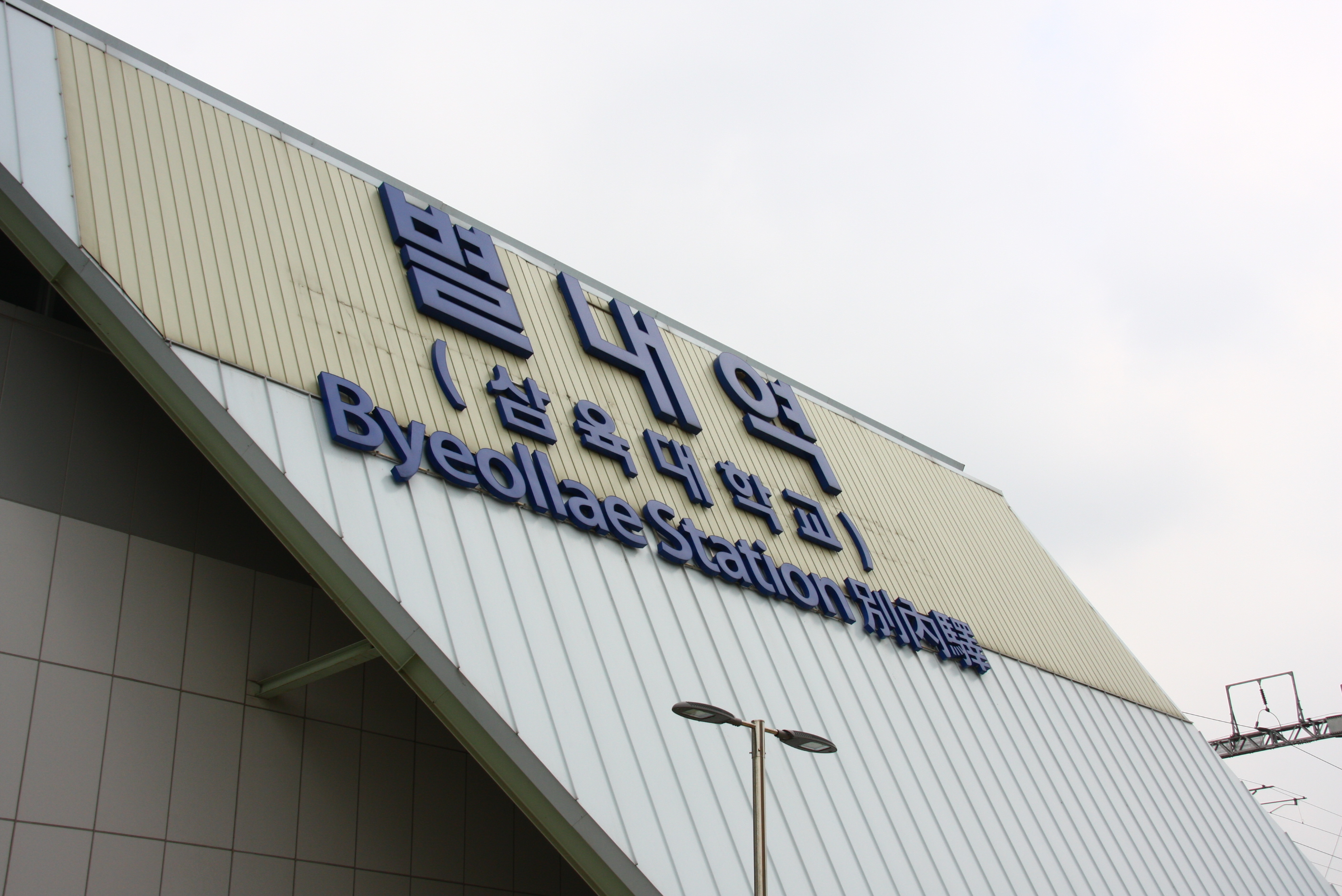
Byeollae Station Outside Sign

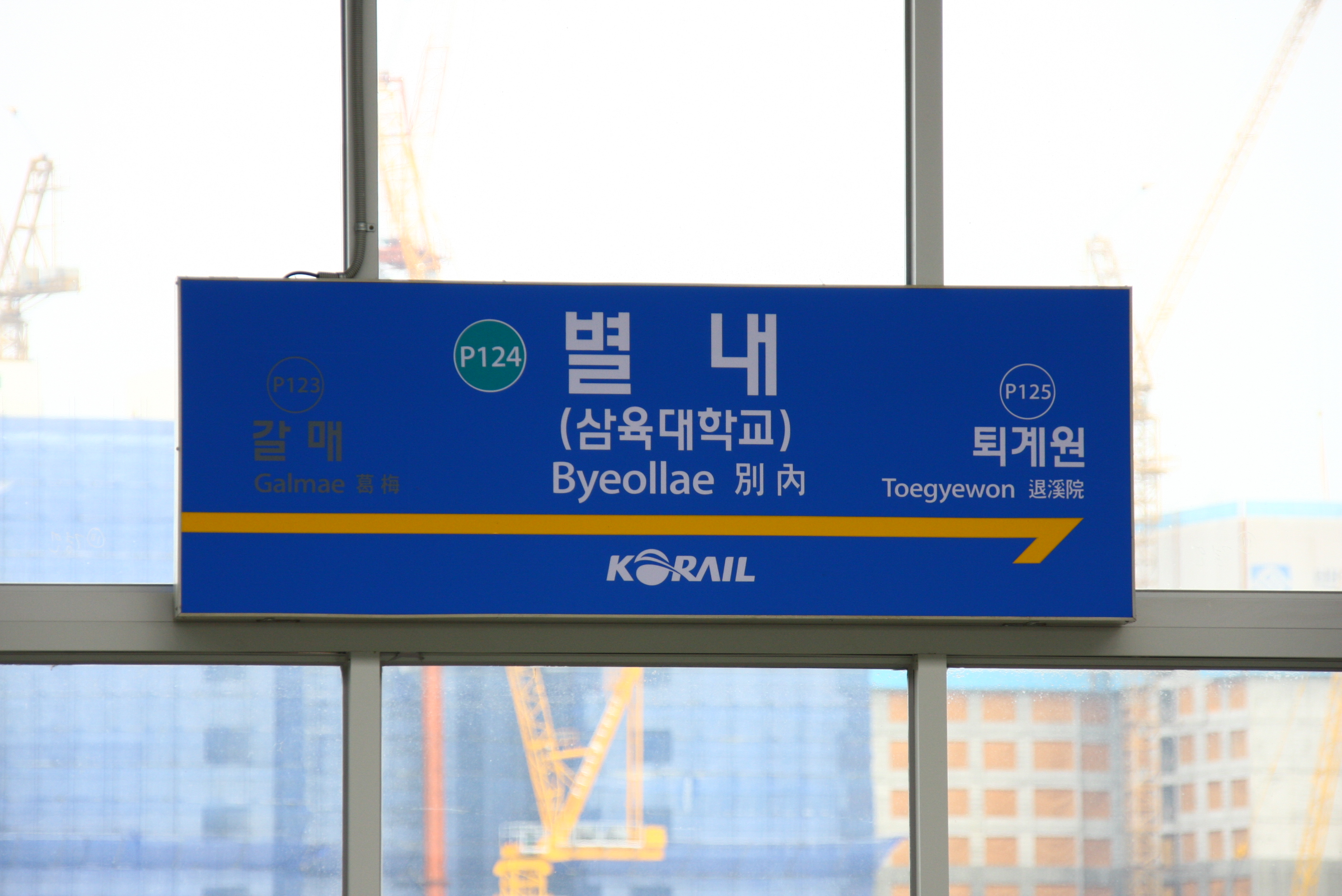
Gyeongchun Line station sign

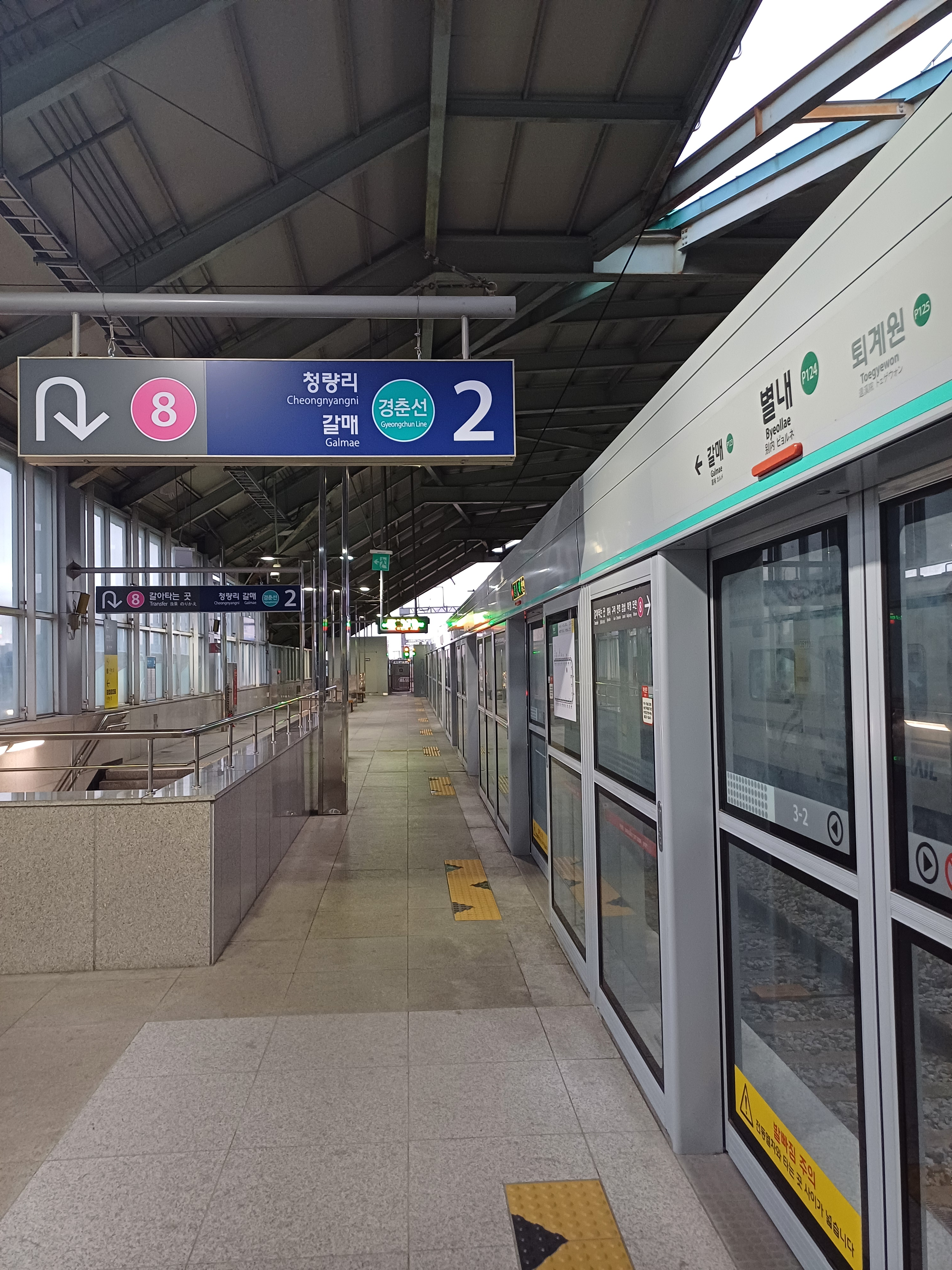
Gyeongchun Line platform

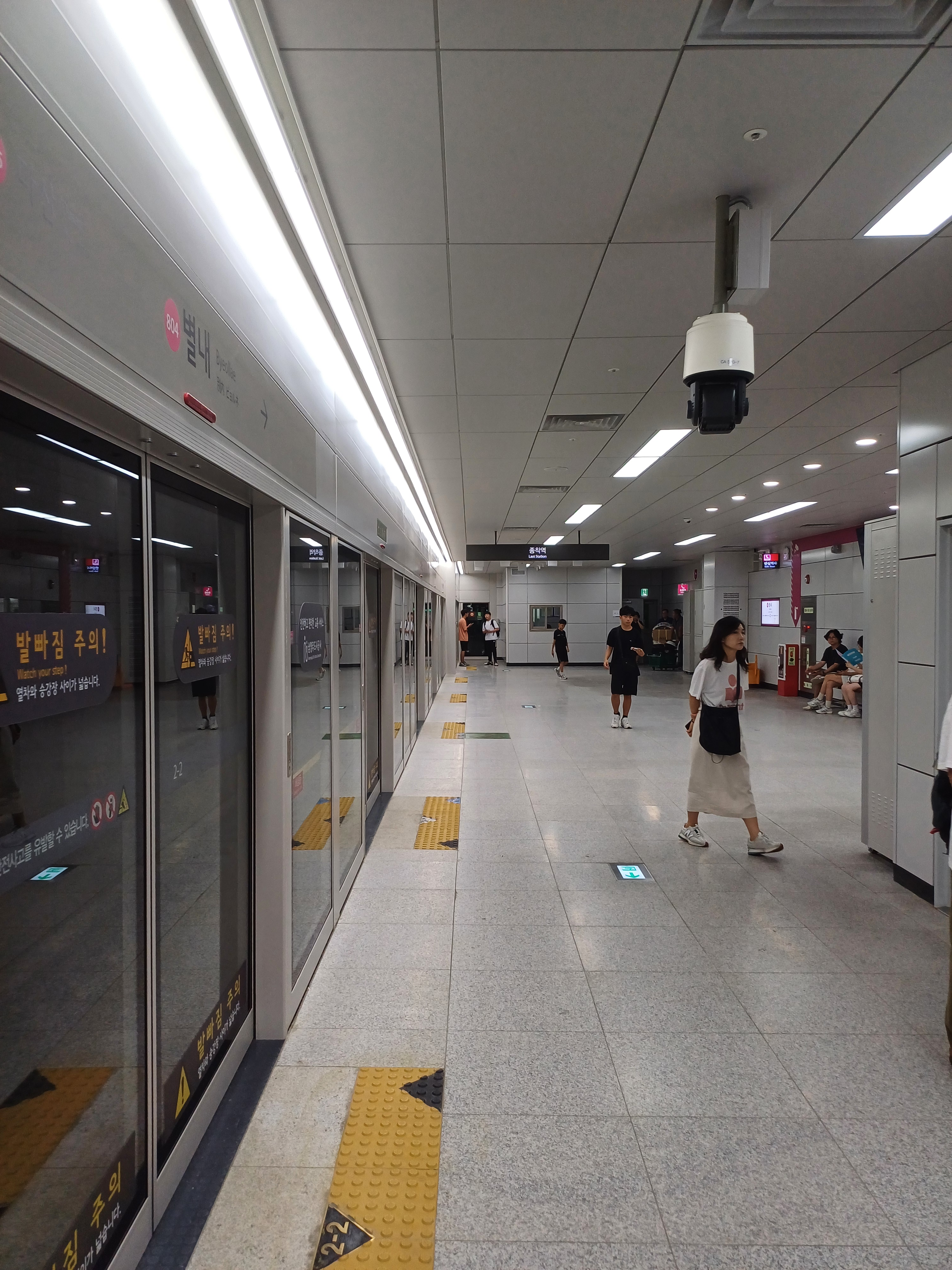
Line 8 platform

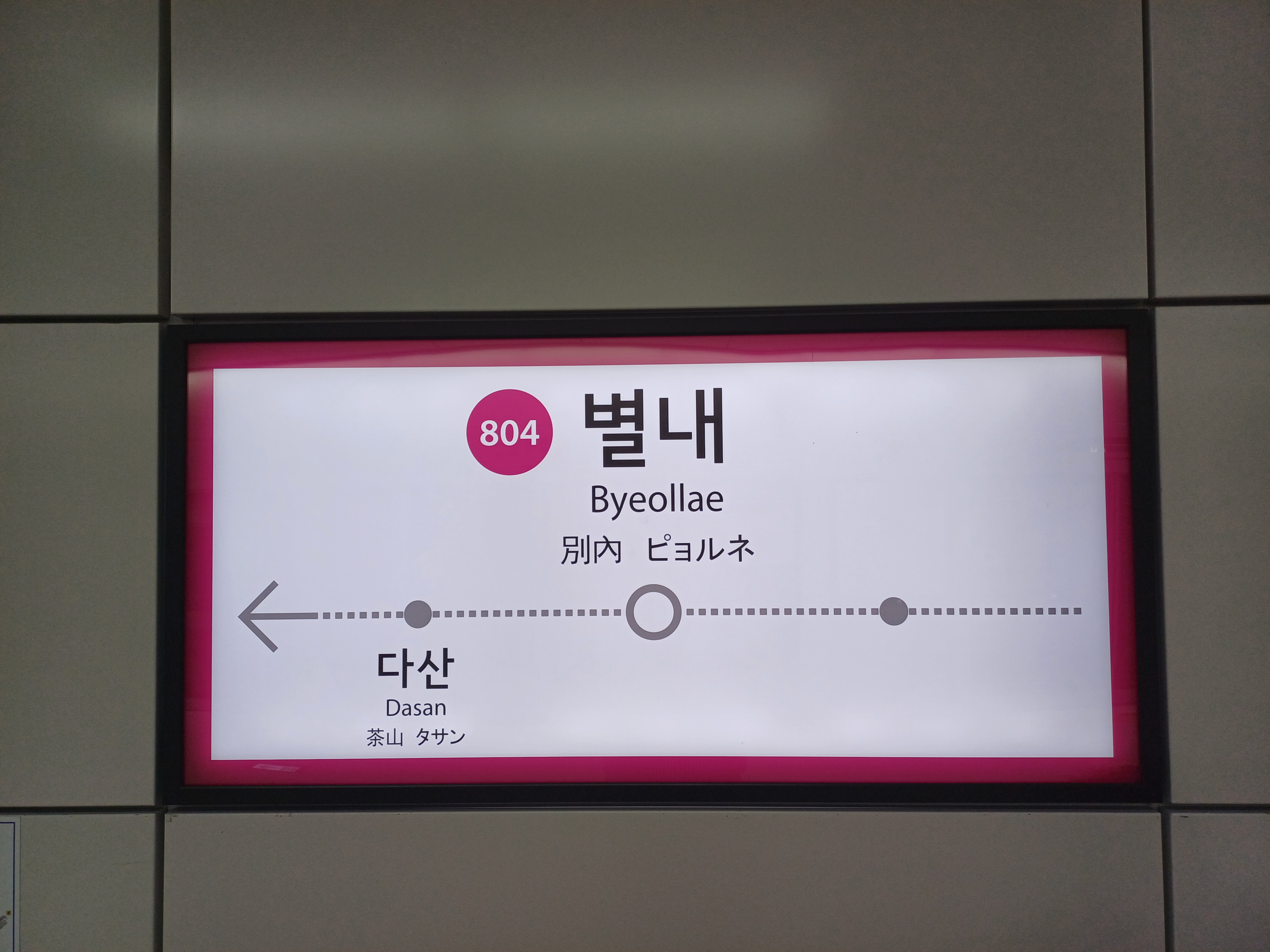
Line 8 station sign
