= Fortress in Singi-ri, Yangsan =

Former fortress in Yangsan, South Korea

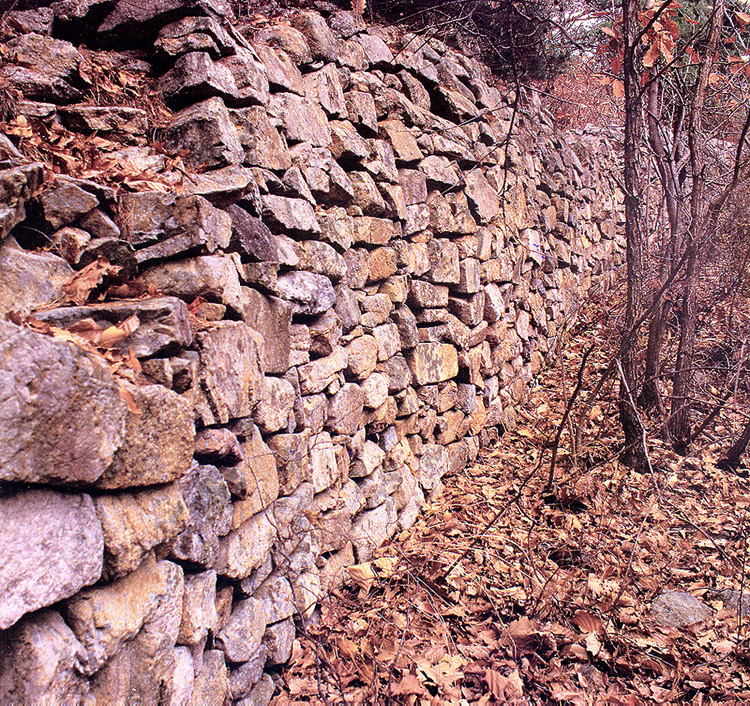
- Part of the fortress ruins
- Interactive map of the Fortress in Singi-ri, Yangsan area

General information
- Location: Yangsan, South Korea
- Coordinates: 35.354°N 129.058°E

Design and construction
- Designations

Historic Sites of South Korea
- Designated: 1963-01-21

The Fortress in Singi-ri (Korean: 양산 신기리 산성; Hanja: 梁山新基里山城), sometimes called Sŏnangsansŏng (서낭산성; 城隍山城) was a Korean fortress in what is now Yangsan, South Korea. On January 21, 1963, its former site was made a Historic Site of South Korea.

It is not certain when the fortress was built. A fortress in this area is mentioned in the Samguk sagi as being constructed around this area in 687 (Korean calendar), but it is not certain if this is the fortress in question. Many relics of the Silla culture have been found in the area, so it is presumed to be made by Silla.
