= Fortress in Bukbu-dong, Yangsan =

Former fortress in Yangsan, South Korea

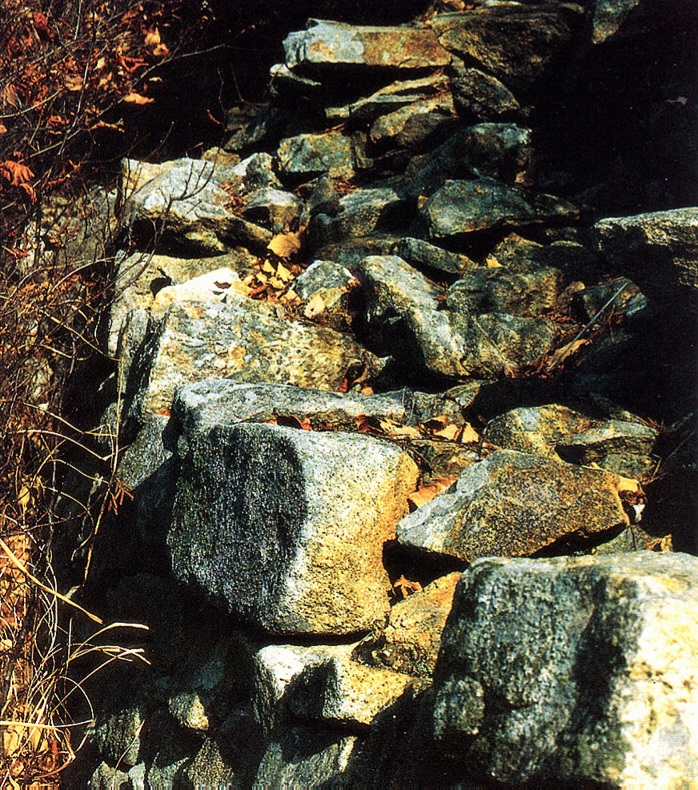
- Part of the fortress ruins
- Interactive map of the Fortress in Bukbu-dong, Yangsan area

General information
- Location: Yangsan, South Korea
- Coordinates: 35°20′27″N 129°3′1″E

Design and construction
- Designations

Historic Sites of South Korea
- Designated: 1963-01-21

The Fortress in Bukbu-dong, Yangsan (Korean: 양산 북부동 산성; Hanja: 梁山北部洞山城) was a Korean fortress in what is now Yangsan, South Korea. On January 21, 1963, its former site was made a Historic Site of South Korea.

It is unknown when the fortress was built. Artifacts dated to the 5th century have been identified in the area. It is recorded in the Samguk sagi that a fortress was created in this area around 687, but it is unknown if this is the fortress in question. A large number of Silla culture artifacts have been discovered in the area, suggesting that it was Silla that constructed it.
