= Sŏngsansansŏng =

Sŏngsansansŏng (Korean: 성산산성; RR: Seongsansanseong) is a Korean-language term that refers to a number of Korean fortresses:

- Sŏngsansŏng (Seongju), sometimes called Sŏngsansansŏng in North Gyeongsang Province, South Korea
- Sŏngsansansŏng (Changnyeong) in South Gyeongsang Province, South Korea
- Sŏngsansansŏng (Haman) in South Gyeongsang Province, South Korea
