= Namhan =

- Hangul: 남한
- RR: Namhan
- MR: Namhan

Namhan (literally South Han) may refer to:

- "South Korea" in the South Korean dialect of Korean (in relation to names of Korea)
- Namhansan or Namhan Mountain, in Seoul, South Korea
- Namhan River, in South Korea

== See also ==
- Bukhan (disambiguation)
