= Guri =

City in Gyeonggi, South Korea

- Municipal City
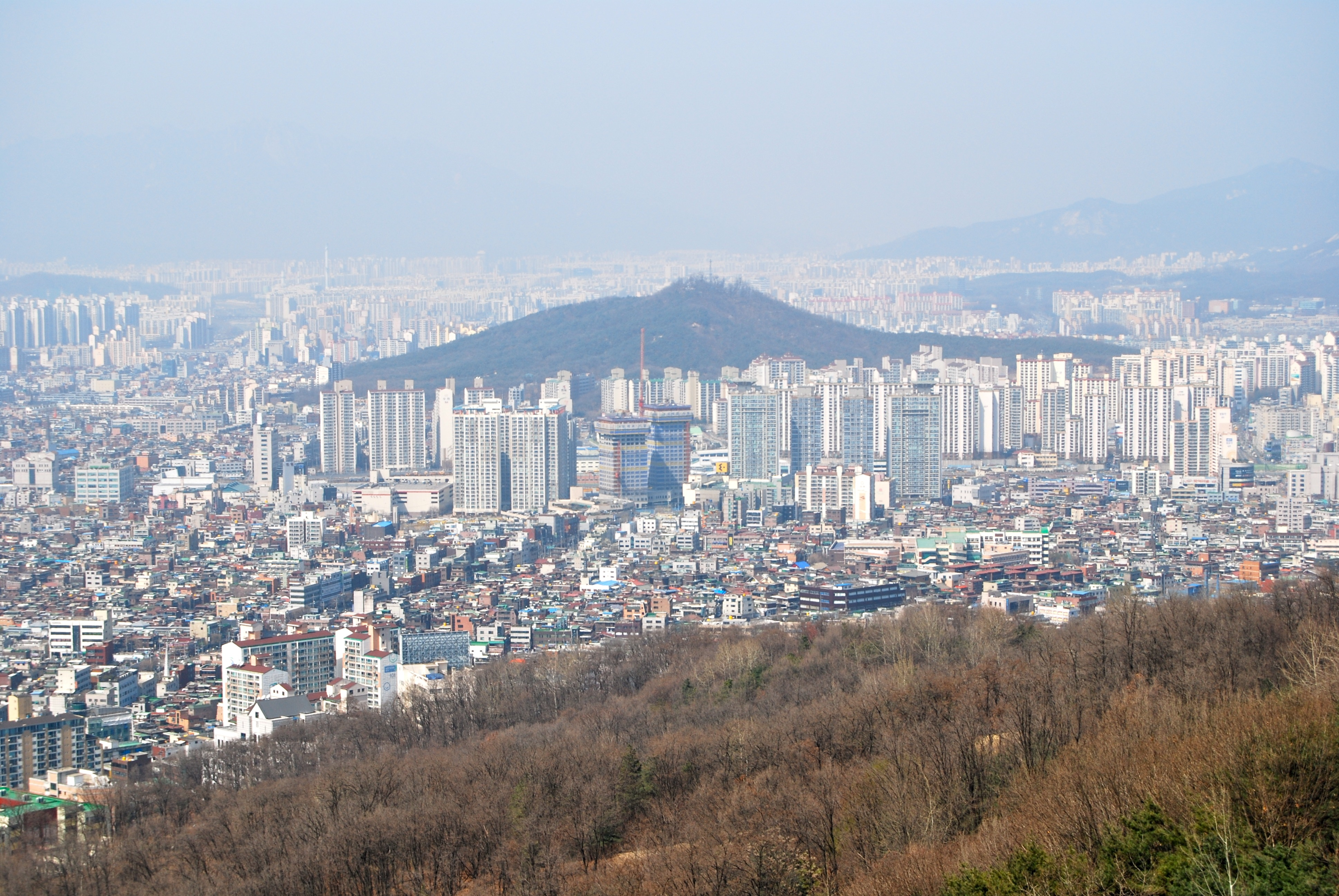
- View of Guri from Achasan

- Flag Emblem of Guri
- Interactive map of Guri
- Country: South Korea
- Region: Gyeonggi Province (Sudogwon)
- Administrative divisions: 8 dong

Area
  - Total: 33.3 km^{2} (12.9 sq mi)

Population (September 2024)
  - Total: 186,571
  - Density: 5,550/km^{2} (14,400/sq mi)
  - Dialect: Seoul

Korean name
- Hangul: 구리시
- Hanja: 九里市
- RR: Guri-si
- MR: Kuri-si

Guri (Korean: 구리; lit. 'Town of Nine Villages (Note: The name was coined when 'Gu'ji-Myeon and Mangwu'ri'-Myeon were merged into Guri-Myeon in 1914.)'; Korean pronunciation: [ku.ɾi]) is a city in Gyeonggi Province, South Korea. It is located immediately to the east of Seoul, in the heart of the Capital Metropolitan Area.

The Royal Tombs of the Joseon Dynasty are located in the city. The hill of Achasan, site of the Baekje-era Achasanseong and numerous hiking trails, is located here; the city also has pleasant walking paths along Wang-suk-cheon, a small creek separating Guri from Namyangju. The traditional town market in Doldari (Guri's downtown around what used to be a "stone bridge") provides a cheap alternative to department stores.

Guri first became a separate city in 1986. It had previously been considered part of Yangju from antiquity until 1980, and part of Namyangju from 1980 to 1986. The name "Guri" was first used in 1914, at which time the area was a myeon in Yangju.

== Location ==
The city lies in the east-northern area of Gyeonggi Province. The mountain of Achasan is to its west, and the city of Namyangju is to the east.

The total area of the city is 33.29 km^{2} (12.85 sq mi); it used to be larger, however, some of the townships were incorporated into Seoul and other cities surrounding Guri.

== Topography ==
Wangsil Stream and the Han River flow into the city, and they have about seventeen tributaries in the region.

== Climate ==
Guri has a humid continental climate (Köppen: Dwa), but at times it can be considered a borderline humid subtropical climate (Köppen: Cwa) using the −3 °C (27 °F) isotherm.

Climate data for Guri (1995–2020 normals)
Month	Jan	Feb	Mar	Apr	May	Jun	Jul	Aug	Sep	Oct	Nov	Dec	Year
Mean daily maximum °C (°F)	2.3 (36.1)	5.5 (41.9)	11.7 (53.1)	18.7 (65.7)	24.5 (76.1)	28.4 (83.1)	29.8 (85.6)	30.7 (87.3)	26.6 (79.9)	20.5 (68.9)	12.0 (53.6)	4.1 (39.4)	17.9 (64.2)
Daily mean °C (°F)	−2.5 (27.5)	0.4 (32.7)	6.1 (43.0)	12.6 (54.7)	18.4 (65.1)	22.9 (73.2)	25.5 (77.9)	26.1 (79.0)	21.3 (70.3)	14.5 (58.1)	6.8 (44.2)	−0.4 (31.3)	12.6 (54.7)
Mean daily minimum °C (°F)	−6.9 (19.6)	−4.2 (24.4)	0.9 (33.6)	7.1 (44.8)	12.7 (54.9)	18.1 (64.6)	22.1 (71.8)	22.5 (72.5)	17.1 (62.8)	9.6 (49.3)	2.3 (36.1)	−4.8 (23.4)	8.0 (46.4)
Average precipitation mm (inches)	12.5 (0.49)	22.5 (0.89)	32.7 (1.29)	66.5 (2.62)	93.4 (3.68)	116.7 (4.59)	405.4 (15.96)	337.2 (13.28)	133.0 (5.24)	48.6 (1.91)	43.7 (1.72)	17.8 (0.70)	1,330 (52.36)
Average precipitation days (≥ 0.1 mm)	3.3	3.8	5.3	7.0	7.0	8.1	14.5	13.8	7.7	5.2	7.0	4.8	87.5
Source: Korea Meteorological Administration

== Transportation ==
Guri is connected to Seoul by two rail lines (Gyeongui–Jungang Line via Guri station, Gyeongchun Line via Galmae station), as well as numerous city transit and intercity bus options.

In 2024, the extension of Seoul Subway Line 8 opened for service, bringing additional subway service to Guri.

== Notable people from Guri ==
- BoA - singer, songwriter, dancer, record producer and actress, she is known as the "Queen of K-pop."
- Xiumin – singer, rapper, dancer, model, actor, MC and member of EXO, EXO-M and EXO-CBX
- Jang Dong-woo – singer, rapper, dancer, model, songwriter, producer, actor and MC (Infinite and Infinite H)
- Gong Myung – actor and singer (5urprise)
- Choi Yoo-jung – singer, rapper, dancer, songwriter and actress (Weki Meki)
- Jihyo – singer, dancer and MC (Twice)
- Doyoung - singer, dancer, actor and MC (NCT, NCT U, NCT DoJaeJung and NCT 127)

== Sister cities ==
- Calamba, Laguna, Philippines
- Carrollton, Texas, United States

== See also ==
- List of cities in South Korea
- Geography of South Korea
