= Sŏksŏngsansŏng =

Baekje-era fortress in Buyeo, South Korea

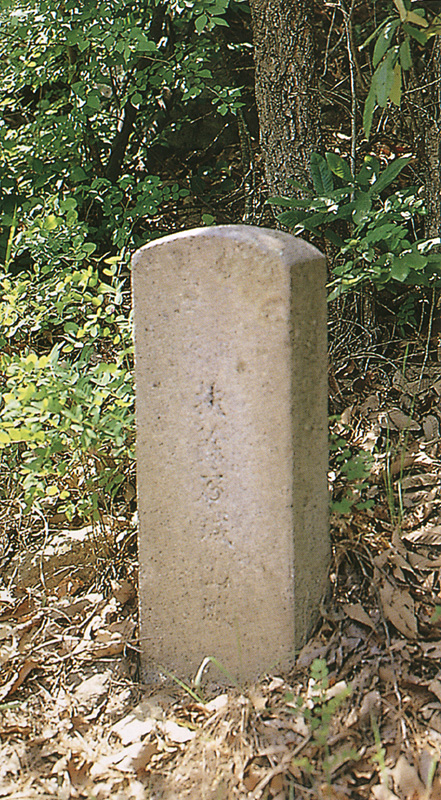
- A stele for the fortress
- Interactive map of the Sŏksŏngsansŏng area

General information
- Location: Buyeo County, South Korea
- Coordinates: 36°14′37″N 126°58′43″E
- Completed: 6th century

Design and construction
- Designations

Historic Sites of South Korea
- Designated: 1963-01-21

Sŏksŏngsansŏng (Korean: 석성산성; Hanja: 石城山城; RR: Seokseongsanseong) was a Baekje-era Korean fortress in what is now Buyeo County, South Chungcheong Province, South Korea. On January 21, 1963, its former site was made a Historic Site of South Korea.

The forterss was built in the first half of the 6th century to protect the Baekje capital Sabi. It connected to the other fortresses Hwangsansŏng, Nosŏngsansŏng, Sŏnghŭngsansŏng, and Kŭmsŏngsansŏng.

It is located on the summit of the mountain Pajinsan (파진산; 破陣山). It has three sets of walls. The outermost wall has a perimeter of 1,605 m (5,266 ft) and an internal area of 158,352 m^{2} (1,704,490 ft^{2}). The second wall has a circumference of 751 m (2,464 ft) and area of 25,400 m^{2} (273,000 ft^{2}). The third wall has a circumference of 607 m (1,991 ft) and area of 19,127 m^{2} (205,880 ft^{2}). There were 7 gates at the fortress.
