= List of Goguryeo fortresses in China =

This is a list of Korean fortresses in China, built by the Goguryeo state in the Liaoning and Jilin provinces in China during the Three Kingdoms of Korea period.

Name	Hangul	Hanja	Pinyin	Present-day	Comment
Holbon/Heulseunggol Fortress	홀본성/흘승골성	忽本城/紇升骨城	Huben/Heshenggu	Wunü Mountain Fortress, Huanren	First capital of Goguryeo
Hwando Fortress	환도성	丸都城	Wandu	Wandu Fortress, Ji'an	
Gungnae Fortress	국내성	國內城	Guonei	Ji'an, Jilin	Second capital of Goguryeo
Geonan Fortress	건안성	建安城	Jian'an	Gaolicheng Mountain Fortress (高丽城山城), Qingshiling, Gaizhou	
Baekam Fortress	백암성	白巖城	Baiyan	Yanzhoucheng (燕州城), Liaoyang	
Ansi Fortress	안시성	安市城	Anshi	Yingcheng Fortress (营城), Balizhen, Haicheng	(Goguryeo: 安寸忽, 안촌홀)
Bakjak Fortress	박작성	泊汋城	Bozhuo	Jiuliancheng (九连城), Dandong	Xi'anping (西安平) prior to Goguryeo rule
Ogol Fortress	오골성	烏骨城	Wugu	Wugu Fortress (乌骨城), Fengcheng	
Yodong Fortress	요동성	遼東城	Liaodong	Liaoyang	known as Xiangping prior to Goguryeo rule
Gaemo Fortress	개모성	蓋牟城	Gaimou	Guchengzi (古城子), Fushun	
Bisa Fortress	비사성	卑沙城	Beisha	Beisha Fortress, Dalian	
Buyeo Fortress	부여성	扶餘城	Fuyu	Nong'an County	Capital of Buyeo, Huanglong Prefecture of Liao dynasty
Ogo mountain fortress	오고산성	吳姑山城	Wugu	Wugu Ancient Town, Dalian	known as Weiba (巍霸) Mountain Fortress prior to Goguryeo rule
Yongdam mountain fortress	용담산성	龍潭山城	Longtan	Longtanshan, Jilin City	
Mokjeo Fortress	목저성	木底城	Mudi	Muqi (木奇) Town, Xinbin County	
Namso Fortress	남소성	南蘇城	Nansu	Wulong (五龙) Mountain Fortress	
Hyeondo Fortress	현도성	玄菟城	Xuantu	Baiguantun (柏官屯), Shenyang	
Gamul Fortress	가물성	哥勿城	Gewu	Sanhepu (三合堡), Tonghua	
Shin Fortress	신성	新城	Xincheng	Gao'er (高尔) Mountain Fortress, Fushun	
Changam Fortress	창암성	蒼岩城	Cangyan		

== See also ==
- Korean fortress
- List of fortresses in Korea
- Korean-style fortresses in Japan
- Cheolli Jangseong
