= Ch'ŏngmasansŏng =

Former fortress in Buyeo, South Korea

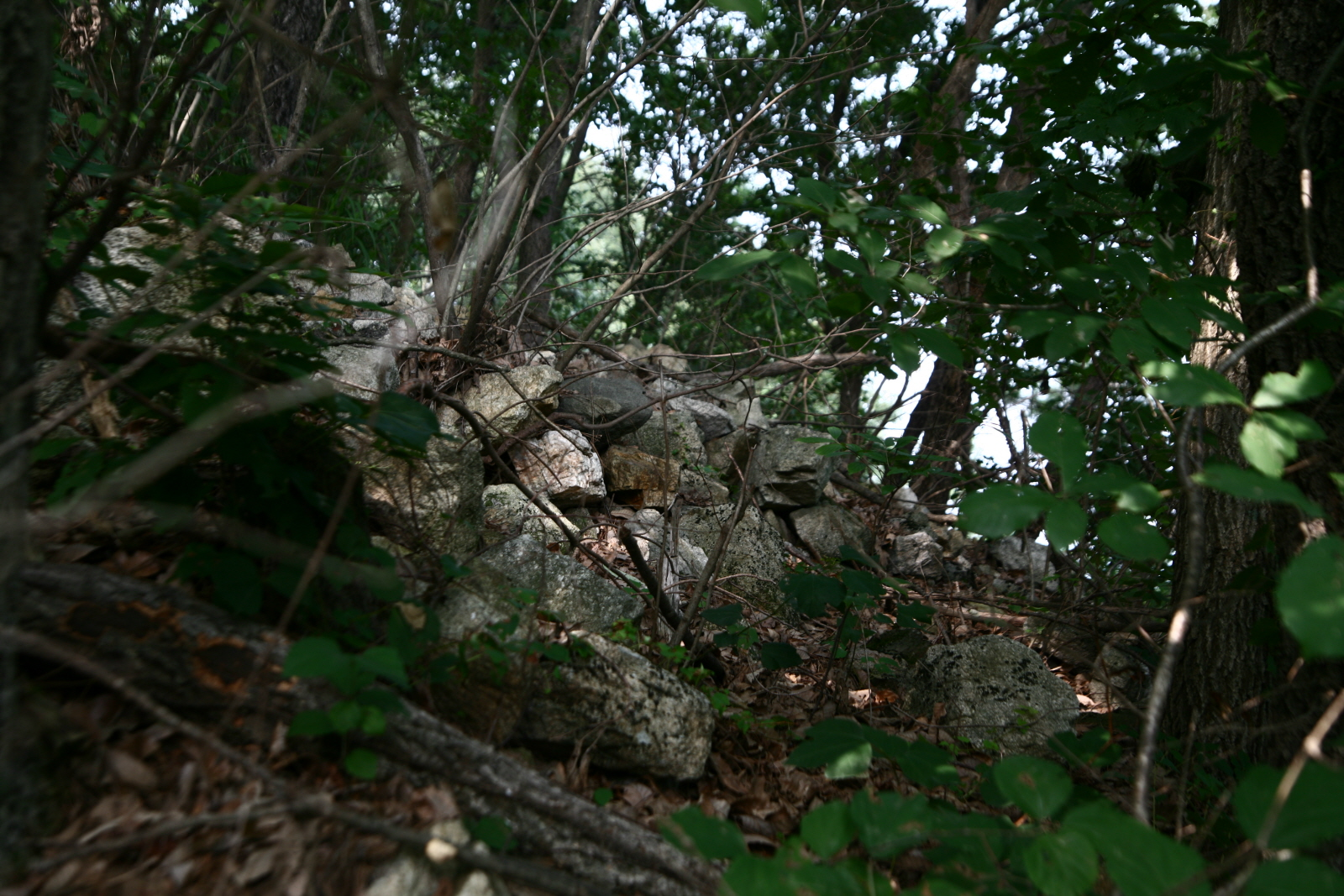
- Part of the fortress's ruins (2010)
- Interactive map of Ch'ŏngmasansŏng
- Location: Buyeo County, South Chungcheong Province, South Korea
- Coordinates: 36°16′45″N 126°58′19″E

Historic Sites of South Korea
- Designated: 1963-01-21
- Reference no.: 34

Korean name
- Hangul: 청마산성
- Hanja: 靑馬山城
- RR: Cheongmasanseong
- MR: Ch'ŏngmasansŏng

Ch'ŏngmasansŏng (Korean: 청마산성; Hanja: 靑馬山城) was a Korean fortress of Baekje in what is now Buyeo County, South Chungcheong Province, South Korea. On January 21, 1963, it was designated Historic Site of South Korea No. 34.

It is located on the mountain Wolmyeongsan. It was constructed in the late Baekje period, and used to defend the capital Sabi. It was the largest and finest of Baekje's fortresses. It had a circumference of 9,277 m (30,436 ft). A number of former sites of its facilities are known, including 10 gates, 36 guard posts, 17 wells, and 14 tombs.
