= Samnyeonsanseong =

Fortress in Boeun, South Korea

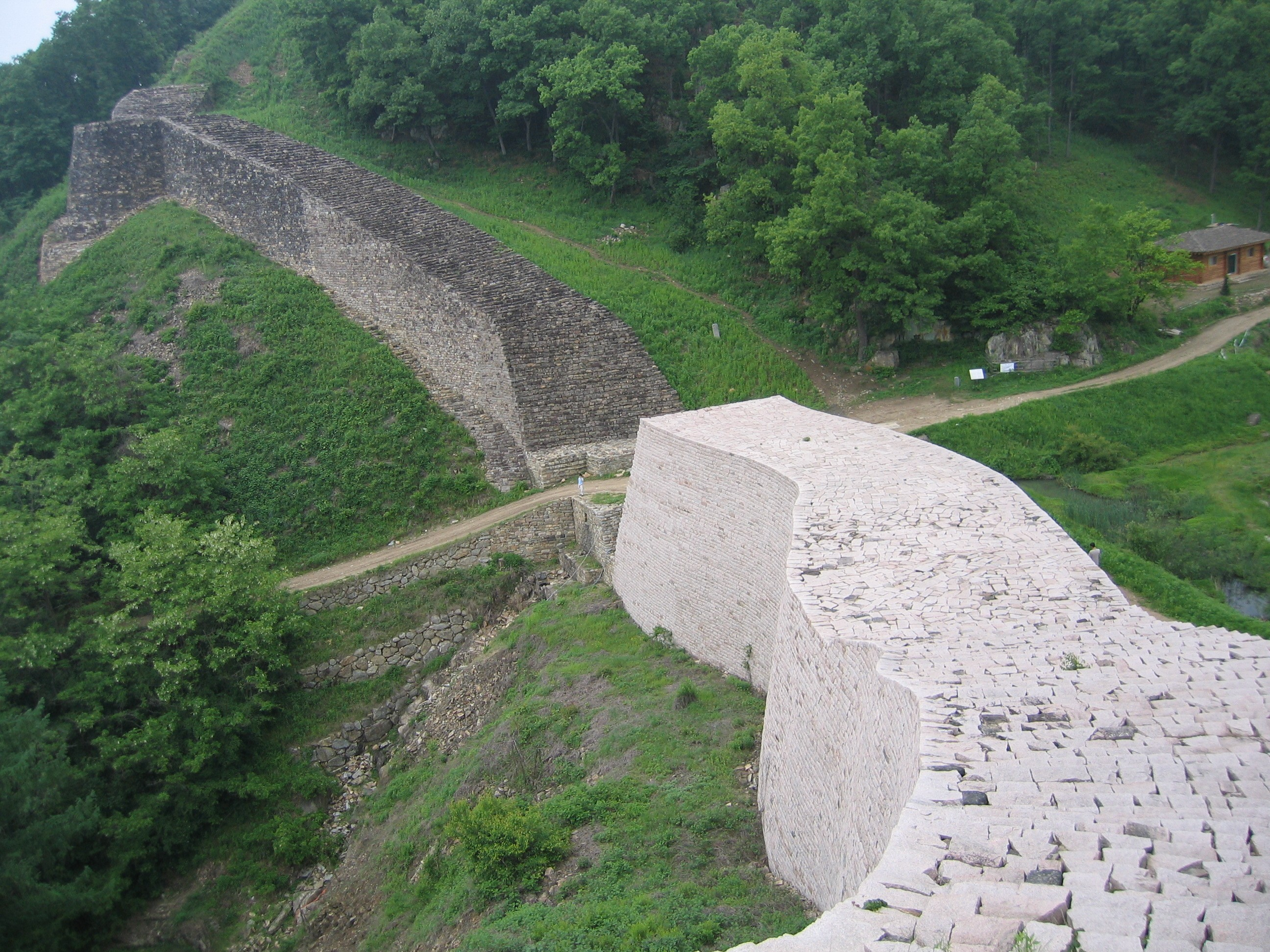
- Largely reconstructed sections of the fortress walls (2006)
- Interactive map of Samnyeonsanseong
- Location: Boeun County, South Korea
- Coordinates: 36°29′14″N 127°44′27″E
- Built: 470

Historic Sites of South Korea
- Official name: Samnyeonsanseong Fortress, Boeun
- Designated: 1973-05-25
- Reference no.: 235

Korean name
- Hangul: 보은 삼년산성
- Hanja: 報恩三年山城
- RR: Boeun Samnyeonsanseong
- MR: Poŭn Samnyŏnsansŏng

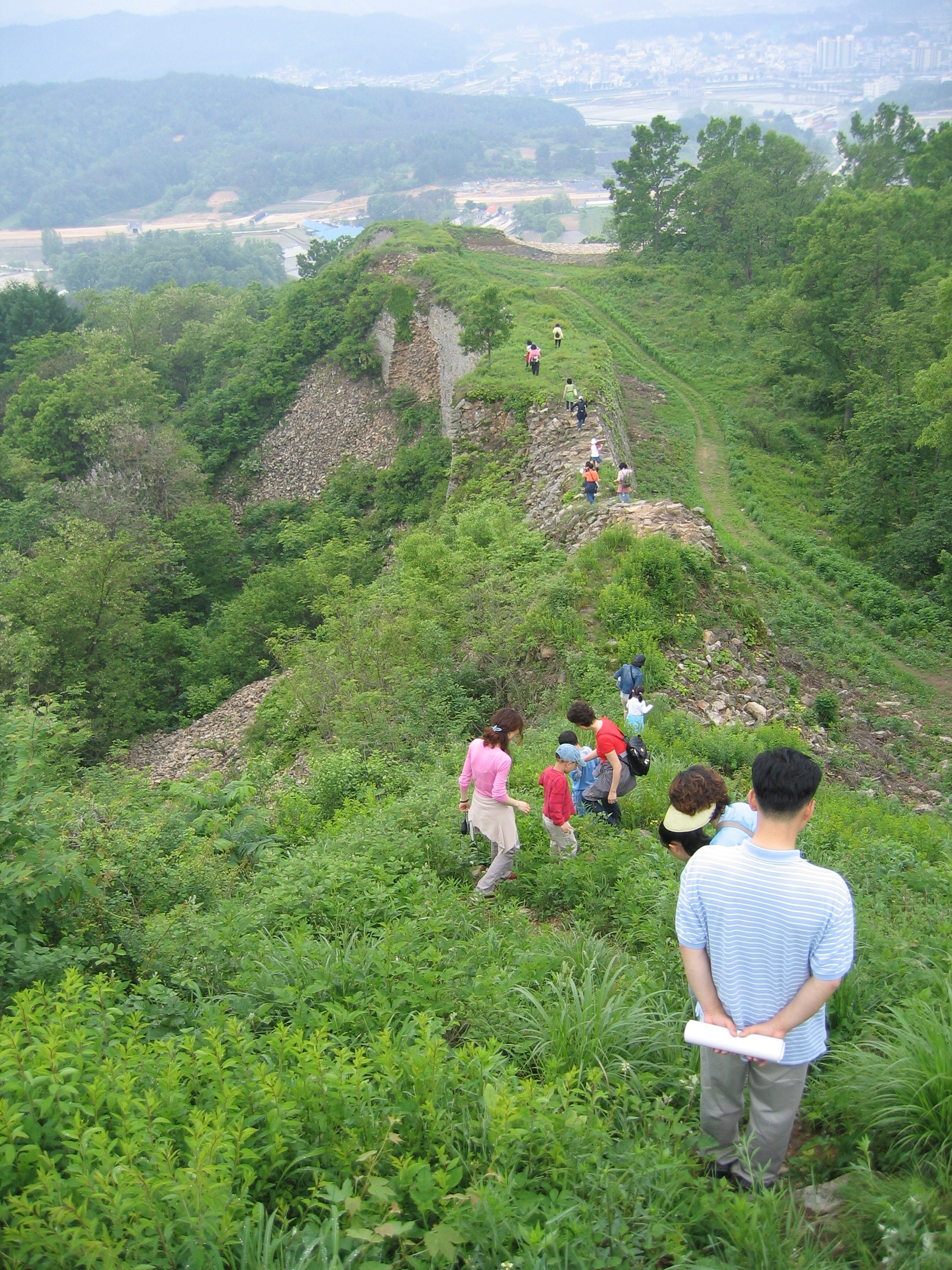
A group of tourists walks along the fortress walls (2006).

Samnyeonsanseong (Korean: 삼년산성; lit. three-year mountain fortress), or Samnyeon Sanseong Fortress, is the ruins of a walled Korean fortress located in Boeun County, North Chungcheong Province, South Korea. It was built beginning in the year 470, during the Silla period.

On May 25, 1973, it was made Historic Site of South Korea No. 235. The fortress has been registered by the South Korean government on the tentative list of sites awaiting approval as a UNESCO World Heritage site.

== Description ==
The fortress was built in 470 and reconstructed in 486. During the Three Kingdoms period the town of Boeun-eup, located two kilometers from the fortress, was known as Samnyeon-gun or Samnyeonsan-gun and it is believed by some that the fortress gets its name from the town. However, the Samguk Sagi relates that the fortress was completed in three years (Korean, sam nyeon), and that the fortress derived its name from this fact. This account also suggests that the nearby town derived its name from the fortress, rather than vice versa. The Veritable Records of the Joseon Dynasty show that the fortress was known as Ojeongsanseong (오정산성; 烏頂山城) and was used during the Joseon dynasty; this name is derived from the fortress's location atop the mountain Ojeongsan.

The walls of Samnyeon Sanseong Fortress measured at 1,880 meters in length. They were built by alternating rows of slim and flat stones placed in horizontal and vertical layers. This method of construction resulted in a very strong wall structure. The walls of the fortress, built on vertical cliffs, combine to create an impenetrable wall which ranged from thirteen to twenty meters in height. The width of the walls ranged from five to eight meters. The walls of stone also incorporated ramparts of mounded earth. Other notable features of the ruins include four gates, seven Ongseong (curved guard bastions), two sluice gates and five wells. The four gates, located approximately equidistantly measure at about 4.5 meters in length. The Ongseong, or guard posts, were placed in areas most vulnerable to attack and were 25 meters in circumference and 8.3 meters in height. A large pond was once inside the fortress and was used as an important water source although only the outline of the pond remains today.

The fortress is valuable because it shows what building techniques were employed by the Silla during the late fifth century. Additionally, Samnyeon Sanseong Fortress exhibits the characteristics typical of a Korean mountain fortress. There are two general classifications of Korean-style mountain fortress. The Pokok style is a fortress which surrounds the valley while the Teimeui style is a fortress where the walls are built around the peaks of the mountain, sometimes described like a folding screen across the mountain. This fortress follows the Teimeui tradition.

The fortress occupied and protected a strategic location and is credited with helping Silla to achieve the unification of Korea. During the late seventh century, Silla used the fortress as a base to attack Baekje to the west while also preparing for advances against Goguryeo to the north. The fortress was pivotal in securing the Han River Valley, the central part of the Korean peninsula. The reputation of the fortress is such that it is said that Wanggeon, the first king of Goryeo, failed in his attempt to take the fortress 918. Excavations in 1983 of artifacts from the Three Kingdoms period up to the Joseon dynasty give clues as to when the fortress was occupied and used. Thousands of tombs also surround the fortress. Another notable feature of the fortress is the presence of engraved calligraphy on a boulder at its entrance, writing that has been attributed to Kim Saeng.

== See also ==
- Doksan Fortress
- Silla
- List of fortresses in Korea
