= Earthen Fortification, Iksan =

Baekje-era fortress in Iksan, South Korea

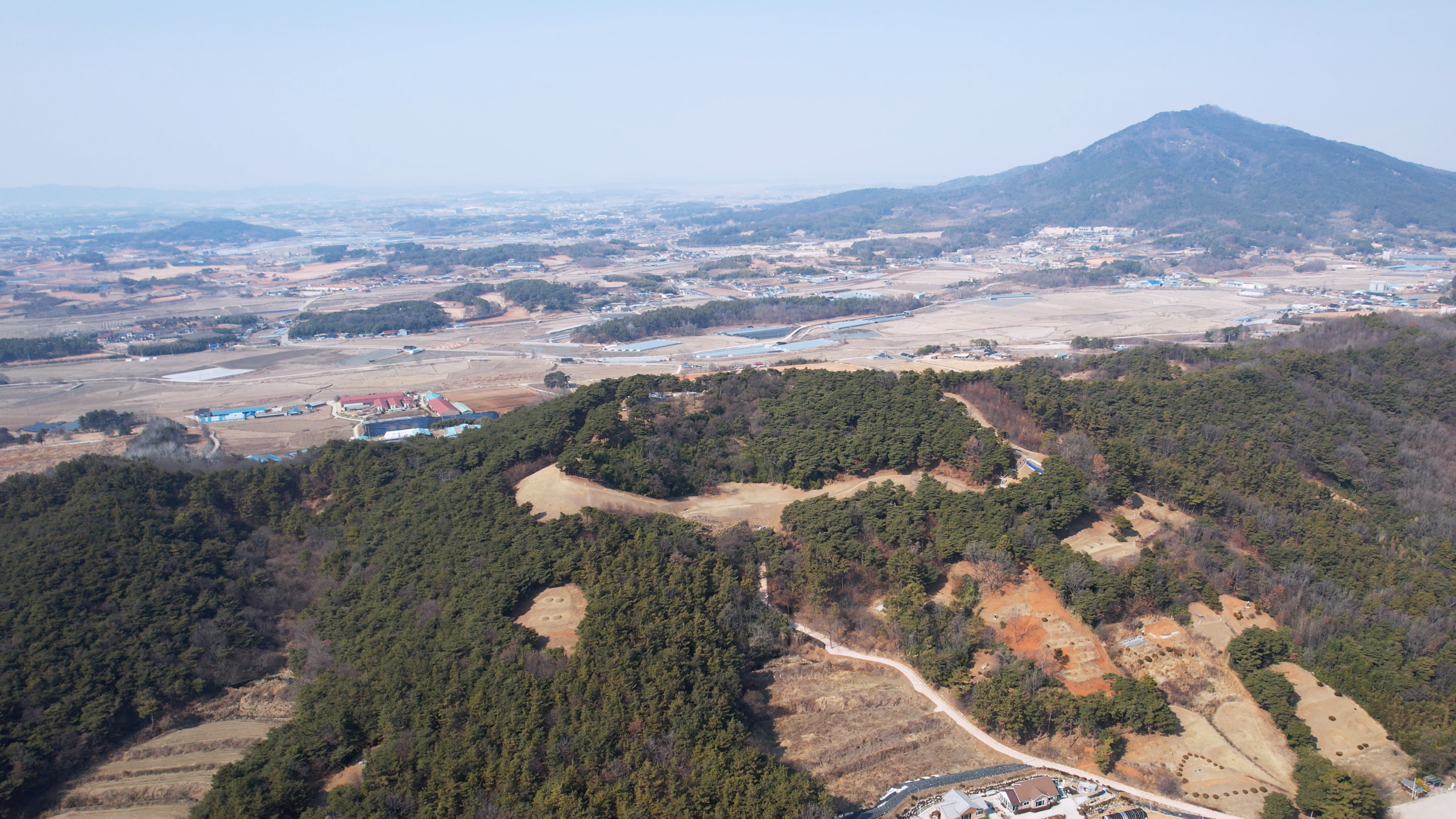
- Site of the fortress (2023)
- Interactive map of Earthen Fortification, Iksan
- 35°59′45″N 127°3′4″E
- Location: Iksan, South Korea

History
- Built: Late 6th to early 7th centuries

Historic Sites of South Korea
- Designated: 1963-01-21

The Earthen Fortification, Iksan (Korean: 익산 토성; Hanja: 益山土城) was an ancient Korean fortress or fortification in what is now Iksan, South Korea. On January 21, 1963, its former site was made a Historic Site of South Korea. It also went by the name Podŏksŏng (보덕성; Bodeokseong).

The fortress was built on the mountain Ogeumsan (오금산). It was built around the late 6th and early 7th centuries. It was originally built during the Baekje period. Various artifacts from the Unified Silla and Goryeo periods have been discovered at the site, suggesting that it continued to be used until then.
