= Achasan =

Mountain in Seoul, South Korea

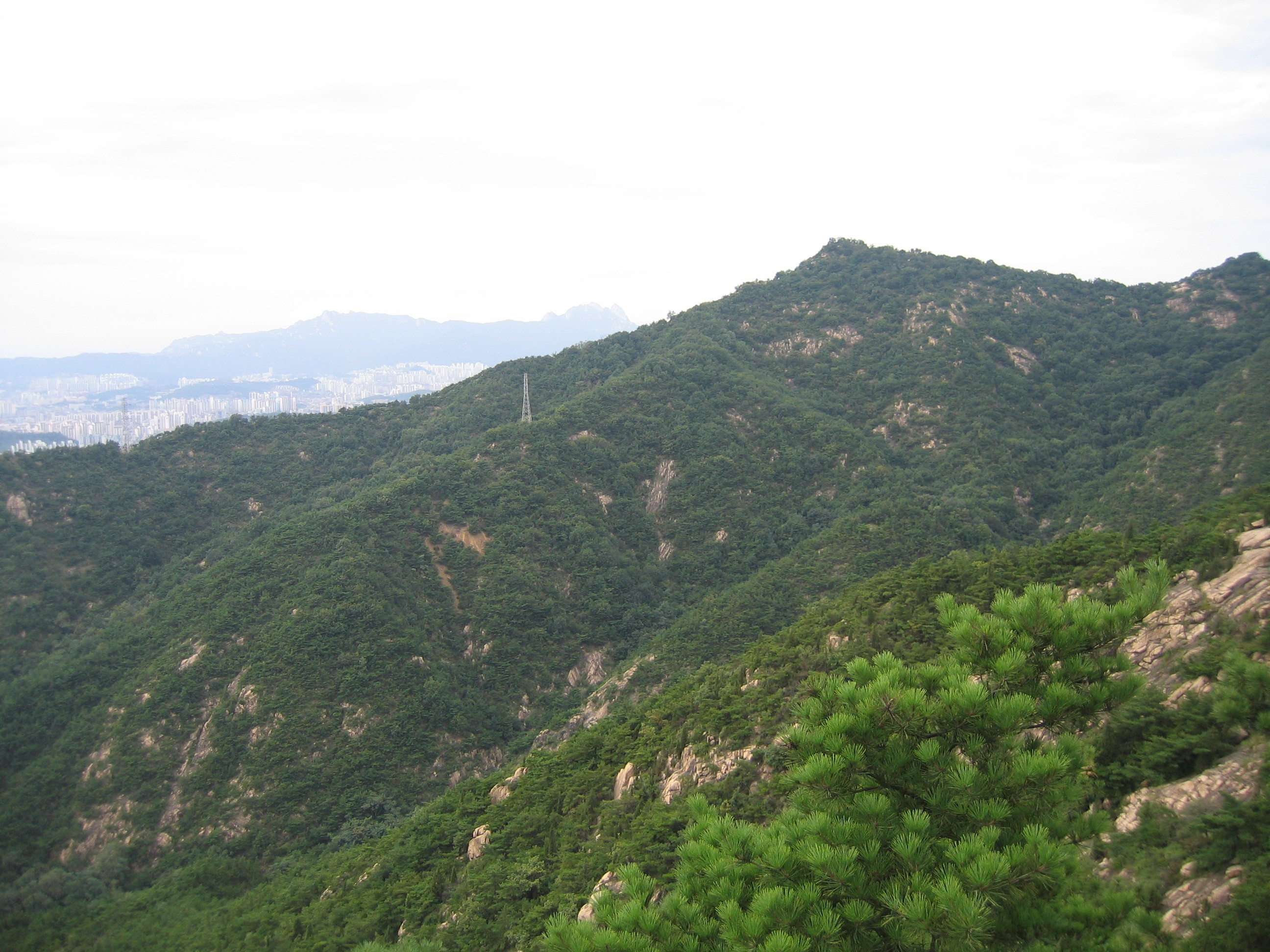

Highest point
- Elevation: 287 m (942 ft)
- Coordinates: 37°33′58″N 127°06′9″E

Geography
- Location within Seoul Location within South Korea
- Location: Location in Seoul

Climbing
- Easiest route: from Achasan station

Korean name
- Hangul: 아차산
- Hanja: 峨嵯山
- RR: Achasan
- MR: Ach'asan

Achasan (Korean: 아차산) is a hill that sits between the Gwangjin District of Seoul and Guri of Gyeonggi in South Korea. It has an elevation of 287 m (942 ft).

There is an extensive system of trails on the Achasan and Yongsan mountains with numerous entrances. People often hike from Yongmasan (용마산) and go to Achasan, or vice versa. Either trail takes about two hours. It has an elevated view of the Han River and of Seoul. At the halfway observation deck and the summit, there is a view of the upper stream of the Han River and the cities of Guri and Hanam. From Achasan Fort the Han River is visible almost in its entirety as it flows through Seoul). This is the closest vantage point for viewing the Han River from above.

== Gallery ==
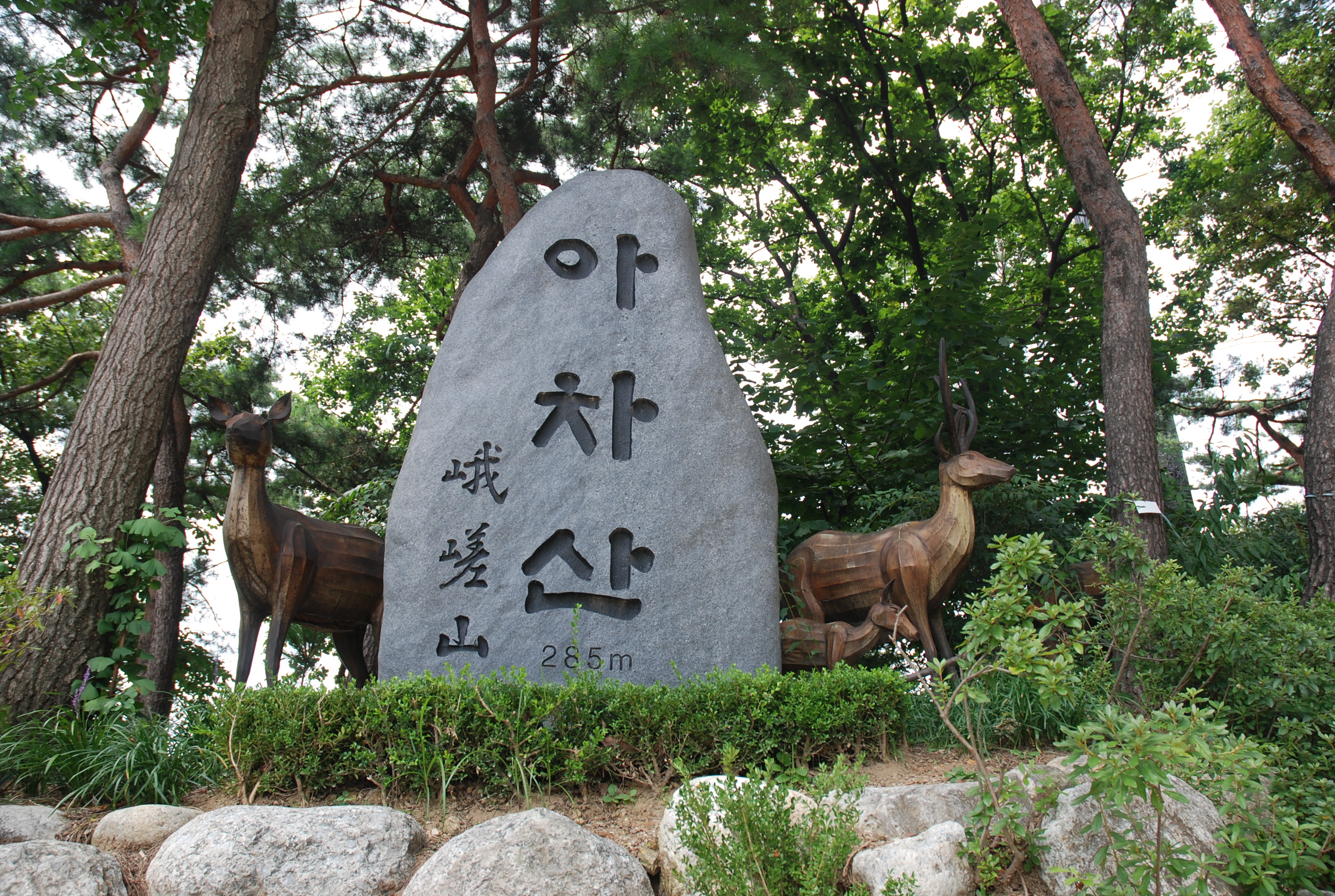
Entrance to one of the mountain's trails (2009)

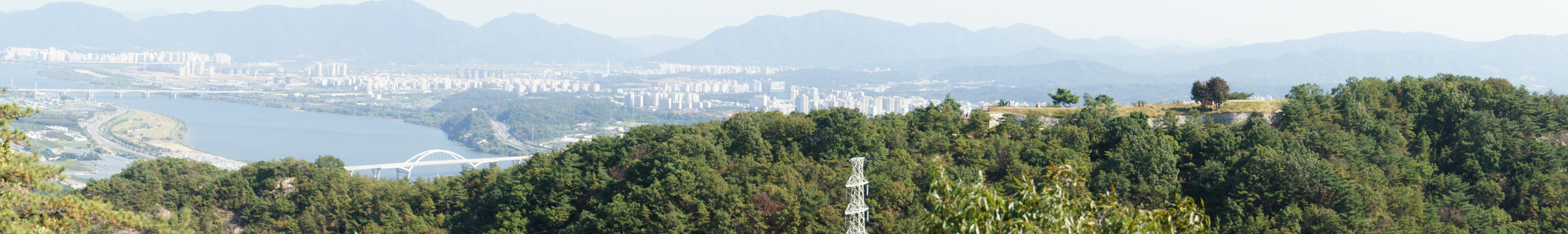
Panorama of Achasan and Achasan Fort, overlooking the Han River (2013)

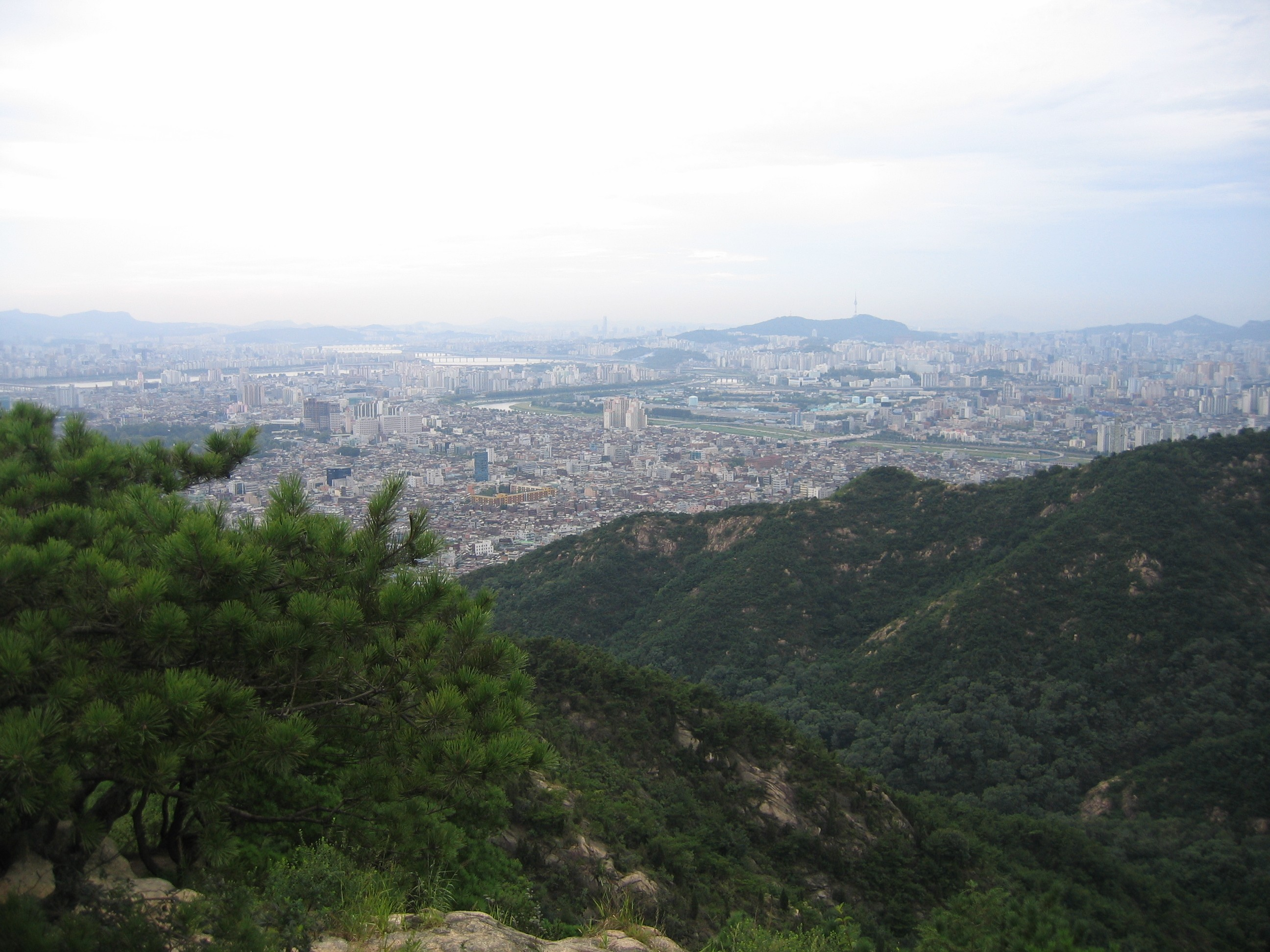
Seoul as seen from Achasan (2011)

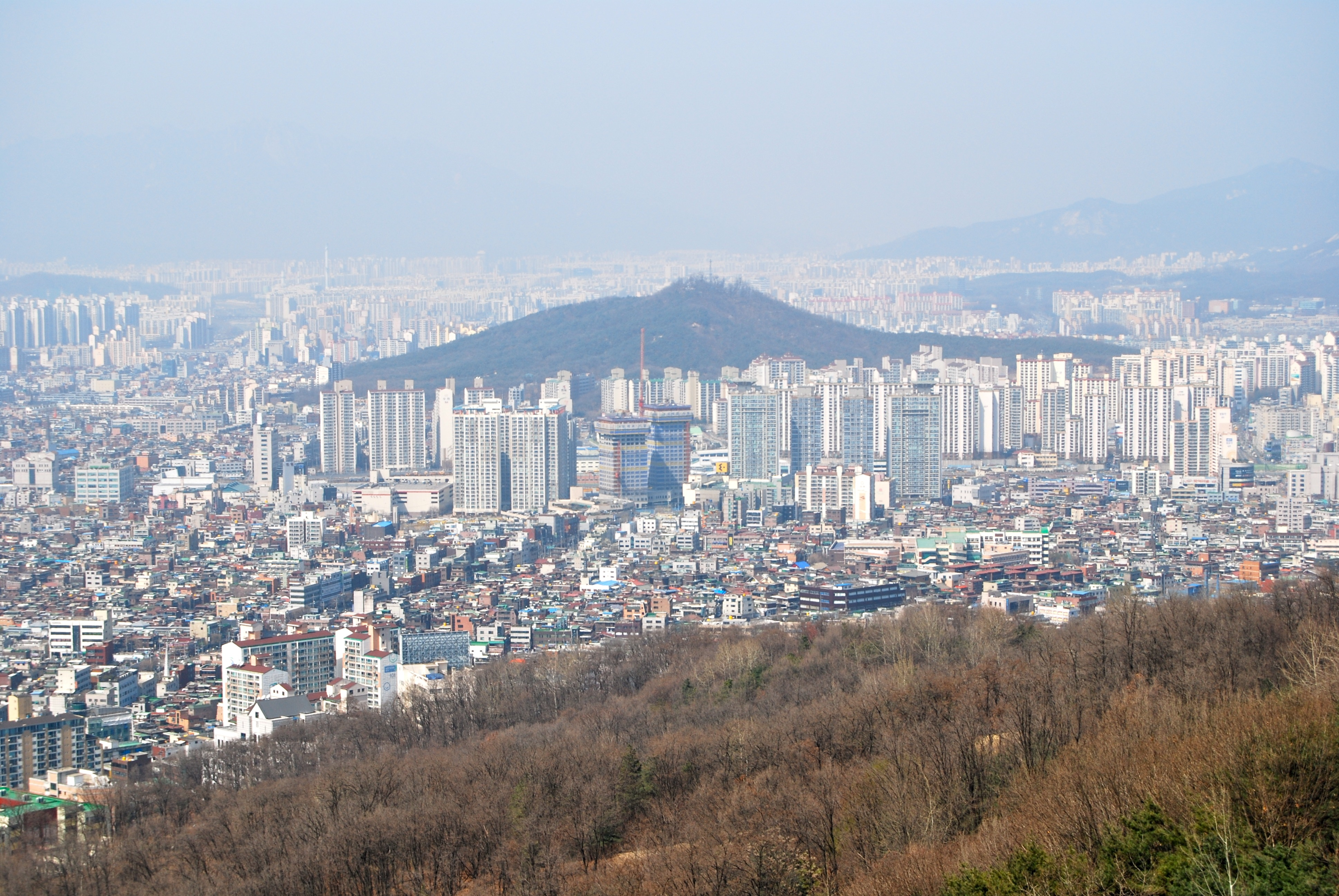
View of Guri, just east of Seoul (2009)

== See also ==
- List of mountains in Korea
- Achasanseong
