= Sŏngsansansŏng (Haman) =

Former fortress in Haman, South Korea

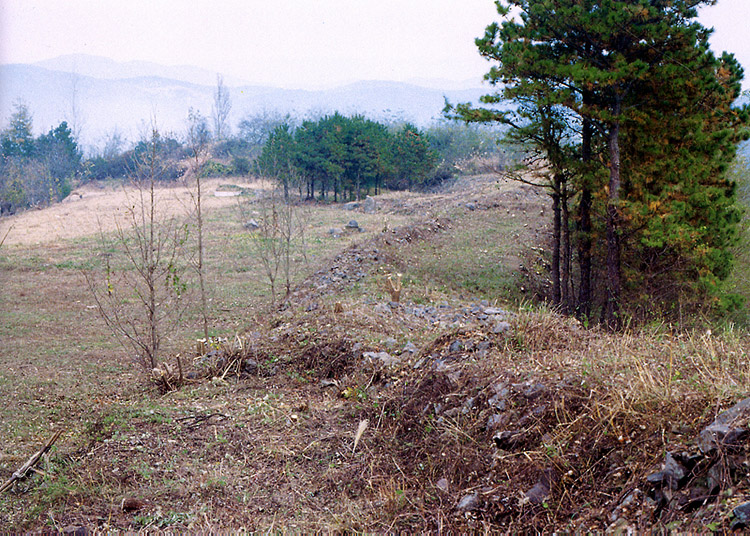
- Part of the ruins (2003)
- Interactive map of the Sŏngsansansŏng area
- Alternative names: Hamansansŏng

General information
- Location: Haman County, South Gyeongsang Province, South Korea
- Coordinates: 35°15′16″N 128°25′10″E

Design and construction
- Designations

Historic Sites of South Korea
- Official name: Seongsansanseong Fortress, Haman
- Designated: 1963-01-21
- Reference no.: 67

Sŏngsansansŏng (Korean: 성산산성; Hanja: 城山山城; RR: Seongsansanseong) was a Korean fortress on the mountain Jonamsan (조남산) in what is now Haman County, South Gyeongsang Province, South Korea. The fortress has also historically gone by the name Hamansansŏng (함안산성). On January 21, 1963, it was made a Historic Site of South Korea.

The fortress was likely constructed by the Gaya confederacy (42–562, Korean calendar). It has two sets of stone walls.
