= Bukhan =

- Hangul: 북한
- RR: Bukhan
- MR: Pukhan

Bukhan (literally North Han) may refer to:

- The colloquial exonym used to refer to North Korea by South Koreans; see Names of Korea
- Bukhansan or Bukhan Mountain, in Seoul, South Korea
- Bukhan River, in South Korea

== See also ==
- Khan
- Bukan
- Namhan (disambiguation)
