= List of fortresses in Korea =

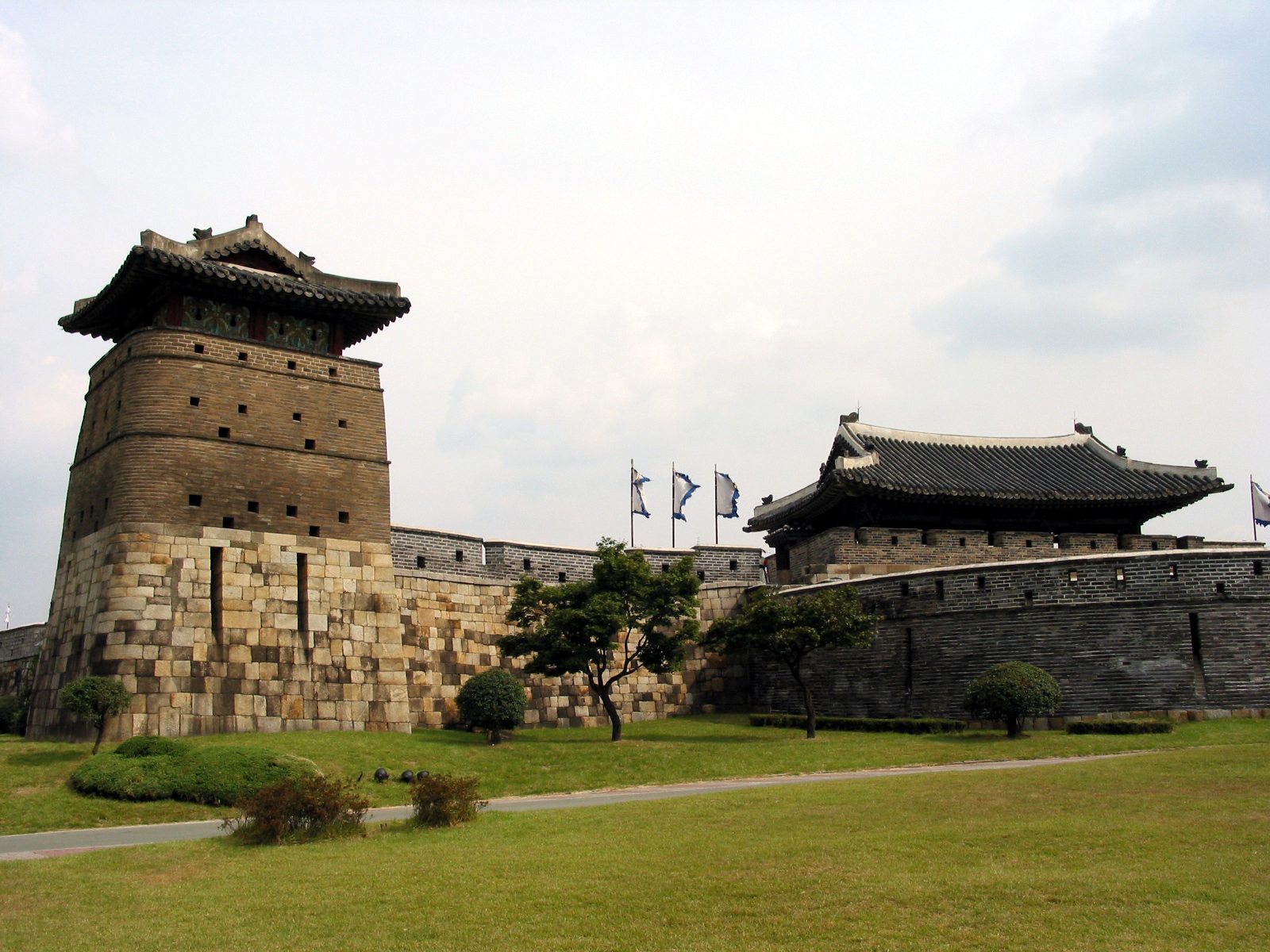
Hwaseong Fortress in Suwon

Korea has a variety of fortresses, including sanseong (mountain fortress), jinseong (camp fortress), and eupseong (city fortress).

== Ancient ==
- Hwando Fortress (위나암성; 尉那巖城) in present-day Wandu
- Sanggyeong (상경용천부; 上京龍泉府) in present-day Ning'an, then capital of Balhae
- Hwangryong Fortress (황룡산성; 皇龍山城)
- Achasanseong (아차산성; 阿且山城)
- Namhansanseong (남한산성; 南漢山城)
- Busosanseong Fortress, Buyeo (부여 부소산성; 扶餘 扶蘇山城) in present-day Buyeo, then third capital of Baekje.
- Wiryeseong (위례성; 慰禮城) in present-day Seoul, then first capital of Baekje.
- Seoul Mongchontoseong (서울 몽촌토성; 서울 蒙村土城)
- Seoul Pungnap-dong Toseong (서울 풍납동 토성; 서울 風納洞 土城)
- Gyeongju Wolseong (경주 월성; 慶州 月城)
- Samnyeon Sanseong Fortress, Boeun (보은 삼년산성; 報恩 三年山城)
- Doksan Fortress (독산성; 禿山城) in present-day Osan

== Joseon era ==
Revised Romanization	Hangul	Hanja	Location	Type	Comments
Fortress Wall of Seoul	서울 한양도성	서울 漢陽都城	Seoul	Defensive wall	Capital of Joseon
Namhansanseong	남한산성	南漢山城	Gyeonggi	Hill fort	
Bukhansanseong	북한산성	北漢山城	Gyeonggi	Hill fort	
Hwaseong Fortress	수원 화성	水原 華城	Gyeonggi	Defensive wall	
Suwongoeupseong	수원고읍성	水原古邑城	Gyeonggi	Defensive wall	
Haengjusanseong	행주산성	幸州山城	Gyeonggi	Hill fort	See Siege of Haengju
Fortress site of Jwasuyeong	경상좌수영성지	慶尙左水營城址	Gyeongsang (Busan)	Defensive wall	See Siege of Busan
Geumjeong Fortress	금정산성	金井山城	Gyeongsang (Busan)	Defensive wall	See Siege of Dongnae
Dongnaeeupseong fortress	동래읍성지	東萊邑城址	Gyeongsang (Busan)	Defensive wall	See Siege of Dongnae
Dadaeposeong	다대포성	多大浦城	Gyeongsang (Busan)	Defensive wall	See Battle of Tadaejin
Busanjinseong	부산진성	釜山鎭城	Gyeongsang (Busan)	Defensive wall	See Siege of Busan
Jinju Fortress	진주성	晉州城	Gyeongsang	Defensive wall	See Siege of Jinju (1592) and Siege of Jinju (1593)
Namwon Fortress	남원성	南原城	Jeolla	Defensive wall	See Siege of Namwon
Yeongwonsanseong	영원산성	領願山城	Gangwon	Hill fort	See Gangwon Campaign
