= Achasanseong =

Ancient fortress in Seoul, South Korea

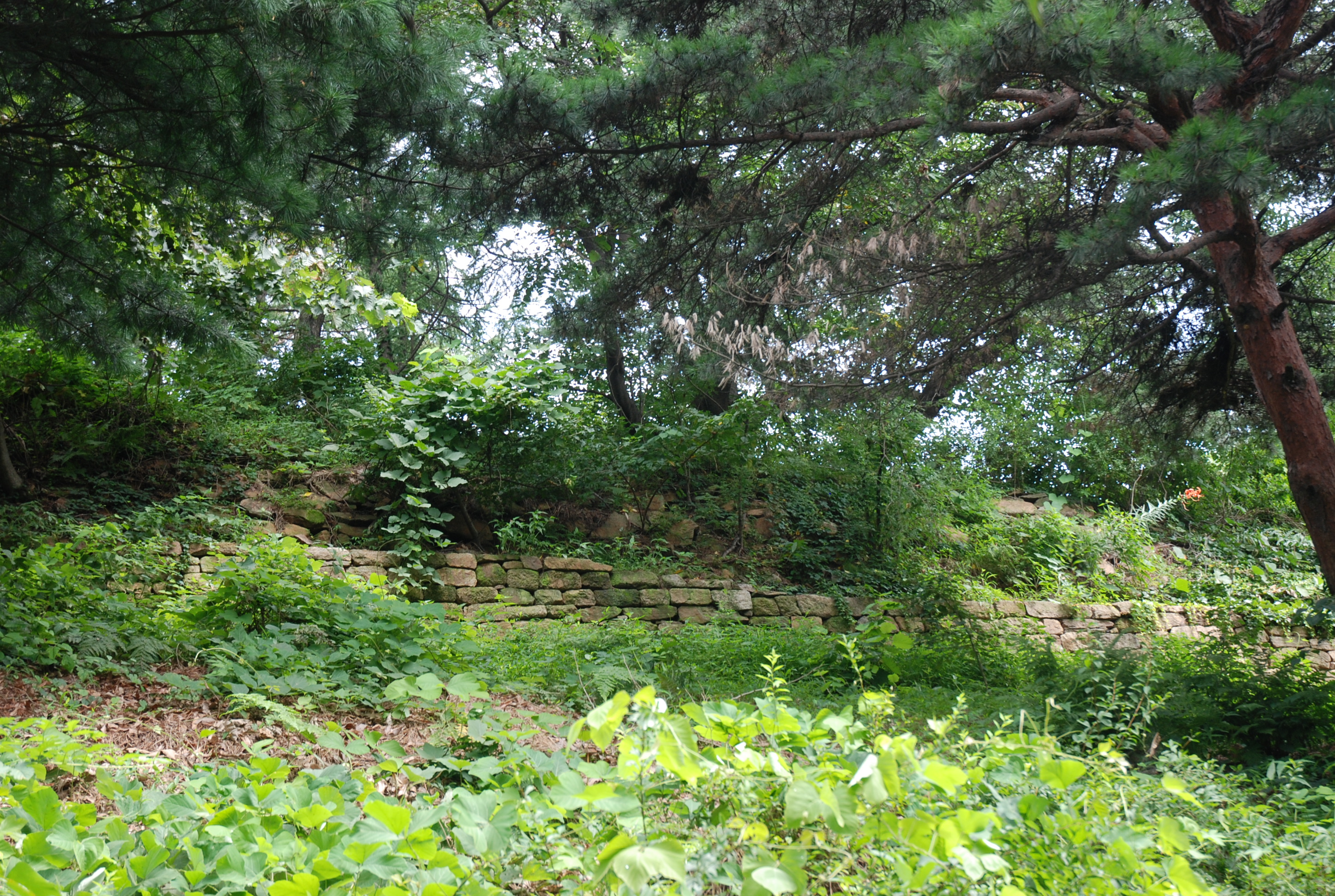
- Part of the fortress's ruins (2009)
- Interactive map of Achasanseong
- Type: Fortress ruins
- Coordinates: 37°33′22.24″N 127°6′16.94″E

Historic Sites of South Korea
- Official name: Achasanseong Fortress
- Designated: 1973-05-25
- Reference no.: 234

Korean name
- Hangul: 아차산성
- Hanja: 阿且山城
- RR: Achasanseong
- MR: Ach'asansŏng

Achasanseong (Korean: 아차산성; Hanja: 阿且山城) is a Three Kingdoms-era earthen Korean fortress on the mountain Achasan, in Seoul, South Korea. Originally built by Baekje, it was occupied in turn by each of the Three Kingdoms. It is at an altitude of 200 meters above sea level. It has a perimeter of roughly 1 kilometer and an area of about 3375 m^{2}.

The first mention of this fortress in historical records comes from the Samguk sagi's statement that King Chaekgye of Baekje ordered it to be fortified against an expected Goguryeo invasion. At that time, Achasanseong would have played a key role in the defense of the Baekje capital Hansŏng from the north.

In 475, Goguryeo overran this and the other defenses of Baekje, and King Gaero of Baekje was brought to Acha and executed. The fortress and the rest of the Han River valley were conquered by Silla in 553. The Goguryeo general On Dal later died here while trying to reclaim the fortress.

Achasanseong was designated as a historic landmark in 1973, and has since become a common local tourist destination.

== See also ==
- History of Korea
- List of fortresses in Korea
