= Namhansanseong =

Fortress in Gyeonggi, South Korea

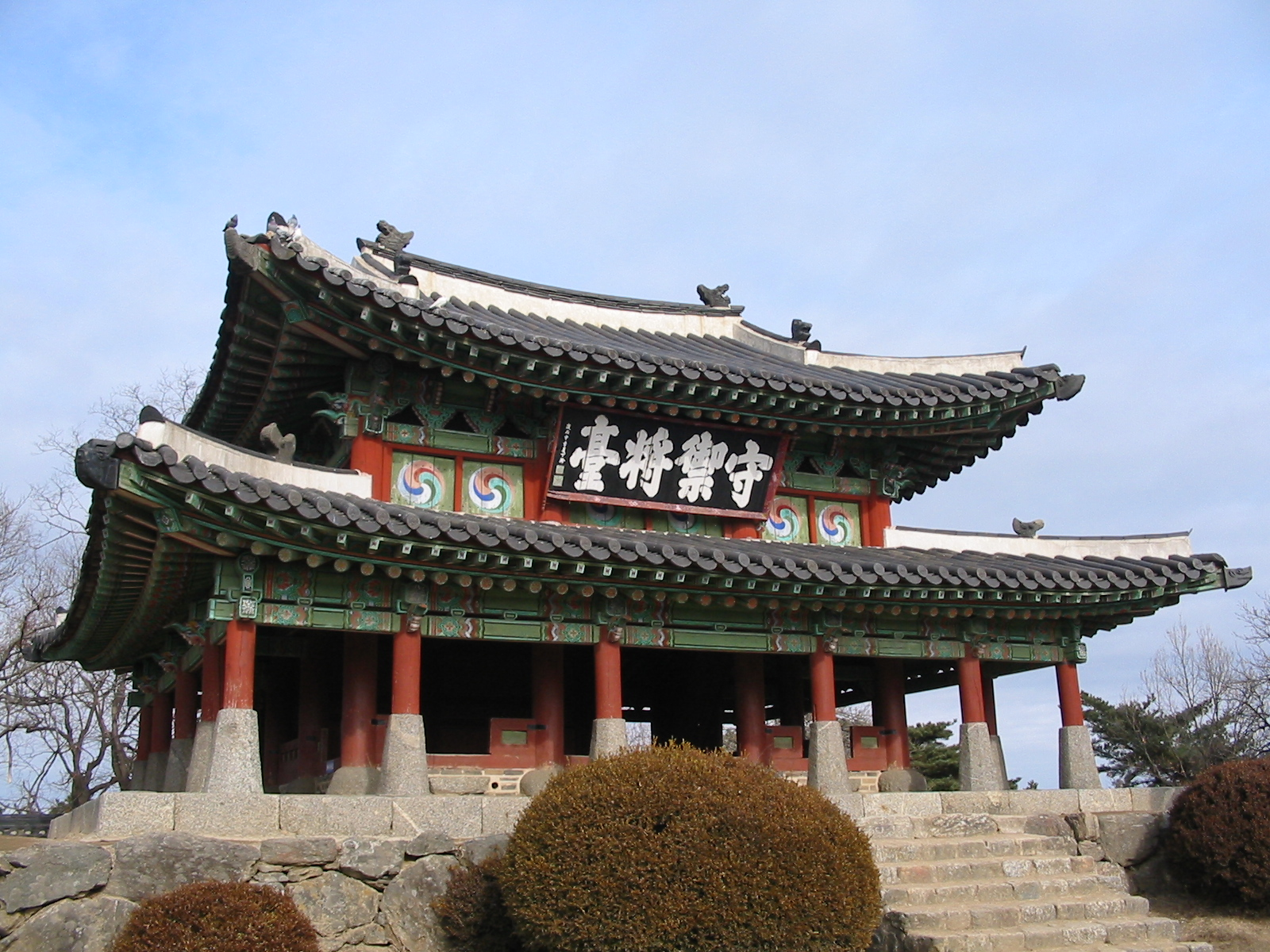
- Sueojangdae (command post; 2002)
- Interactive map of Namhansanseong
- Coordinates: 37°28′44″N 127°10′52″E
- Location: Gwangju, Gyeonggi Province, South Korea

Site notes
- Area: 409.06 ha (1.5794 sq mi)

UNESCO World Heritage Site
- Type: Cultural
- Criteria: ii, iv
- Designated: 2014
- Reference no.: 1439

Historic Sites of South Korea
- Official name: Namhansanseong Fortress
- Designated: 1963-01-21
- Reference no.: 57

Korean name
- Hangul: 남한산성
- Hanja: 南漢山城
- RR: Namhansanseong
- MR: Namhansansŏng

Namhansanseong (Korean: 남한산성; Hanja: 南漢山城) is a historic Korean fortress city in Gwangju, Gyeonggi Province, South Korea. A UNESCO World Heritage Site, the fortress lies atop the mountain Namhansan and stretches 12 km in length. It served as an emergency capital city during the 1392–1910 Joseon period. The design is based on fortress architecture of East Asia, embodying aspects of four historical cultural styles: Joseon of Korea, the Azuchi-Momoyama Period of Japan, and Ming and Qing China.

It was extensively developed during the 16th to 18th centuries, a period of continuous warfare. The technical development of weaponry and armaments during this period, which saw the use of gunpowder imported from Europe, also greatly influenced the architecture and layout of the fortress. Namhansanseong portrays how the various theories of defense mechanisms in Korea were put to form by combining the everyday living environment with defense objectives. The fortress indicates how Buddhism played an influential role in protecting the state, and it became a symbol of sovereignty in Korea.

It can be accessed from Seoul through Namhansanseong station of Seoul Subway Line 8.

== History ==
Namhansanseong now lies atop the mountain Namhansan. This location made it highly defensible; even before the fortress's construction, a number of defensive structures existed in the area. A 2005 archaeological dig found a fortress called Jujangseong that dated to the 57–935 Silla period. During the Goryeo period, a fortification existed in the area that was called "Gwangju Fortress" (광주성; 廣州城).

The fortress's construction was motivated by the 1624 Yi Gwal's Rebellion and 1627 Later Jin invasion of Joseon. King Injo ordered Yi Sŏ to construct it. Buddhist monk-soldiers were recruited from all eight provinces for the task. Over time, features were continually added to the fortress; it eventually became the best-equipped in Korea. The fortress proper (excluding outermost walls) reached a circumference of 7.545 km (4.688 mi). Its interior area was 212.6637 ha (525.503 acres).

Namhansanseong was constructed as an emergency capital city during war, and administrative center during peace. It had an emergency palace for the king, military buildings, and accommodations for regular people. It was capable of housing around 4,000 people. Thus, both commoners and king were expected to live in the fortress, unlike in some European castles where commoners were made to live outside the fortifications.

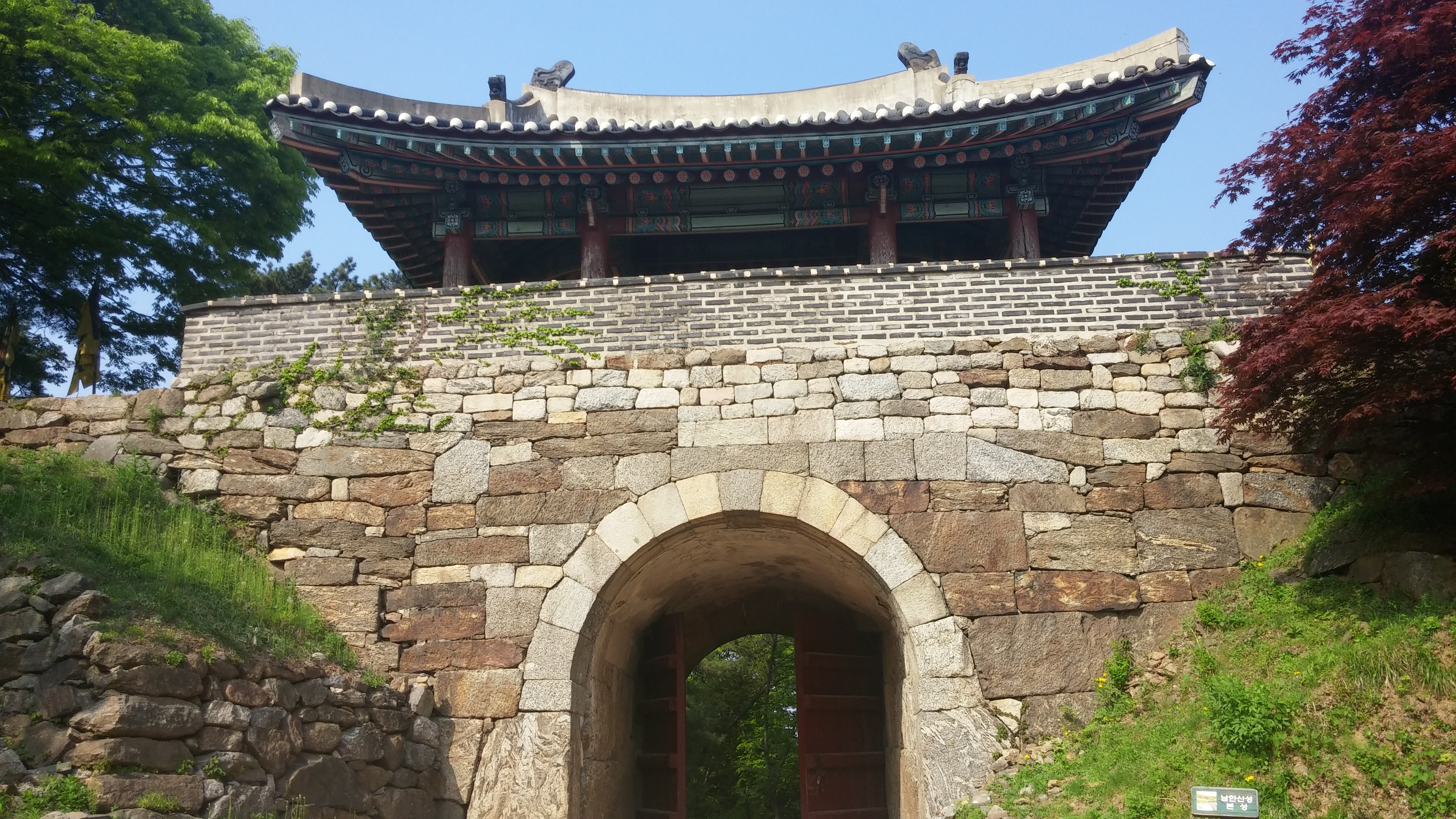
Namhansanseong North Gate

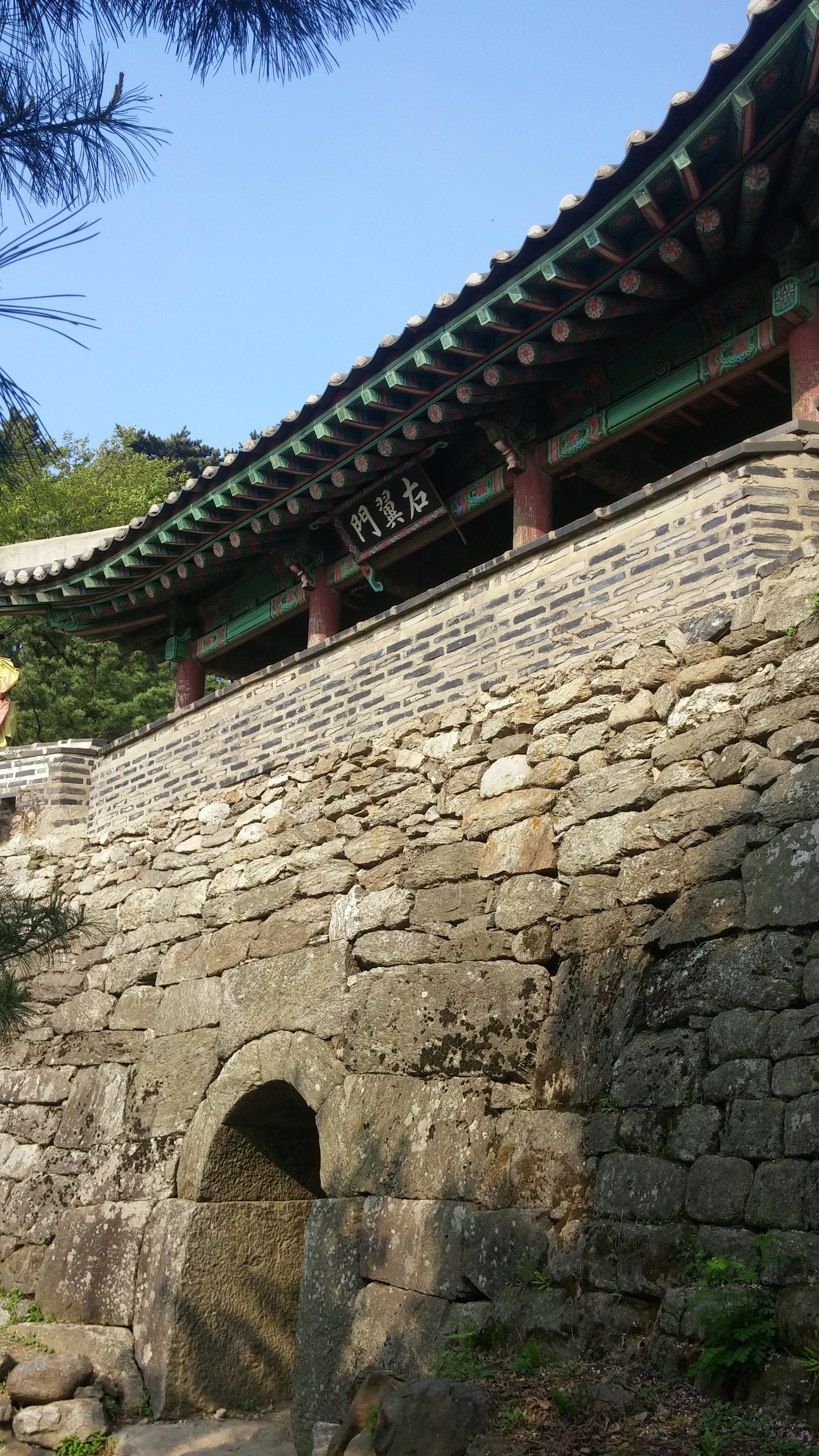
Namhansanseong West Gate

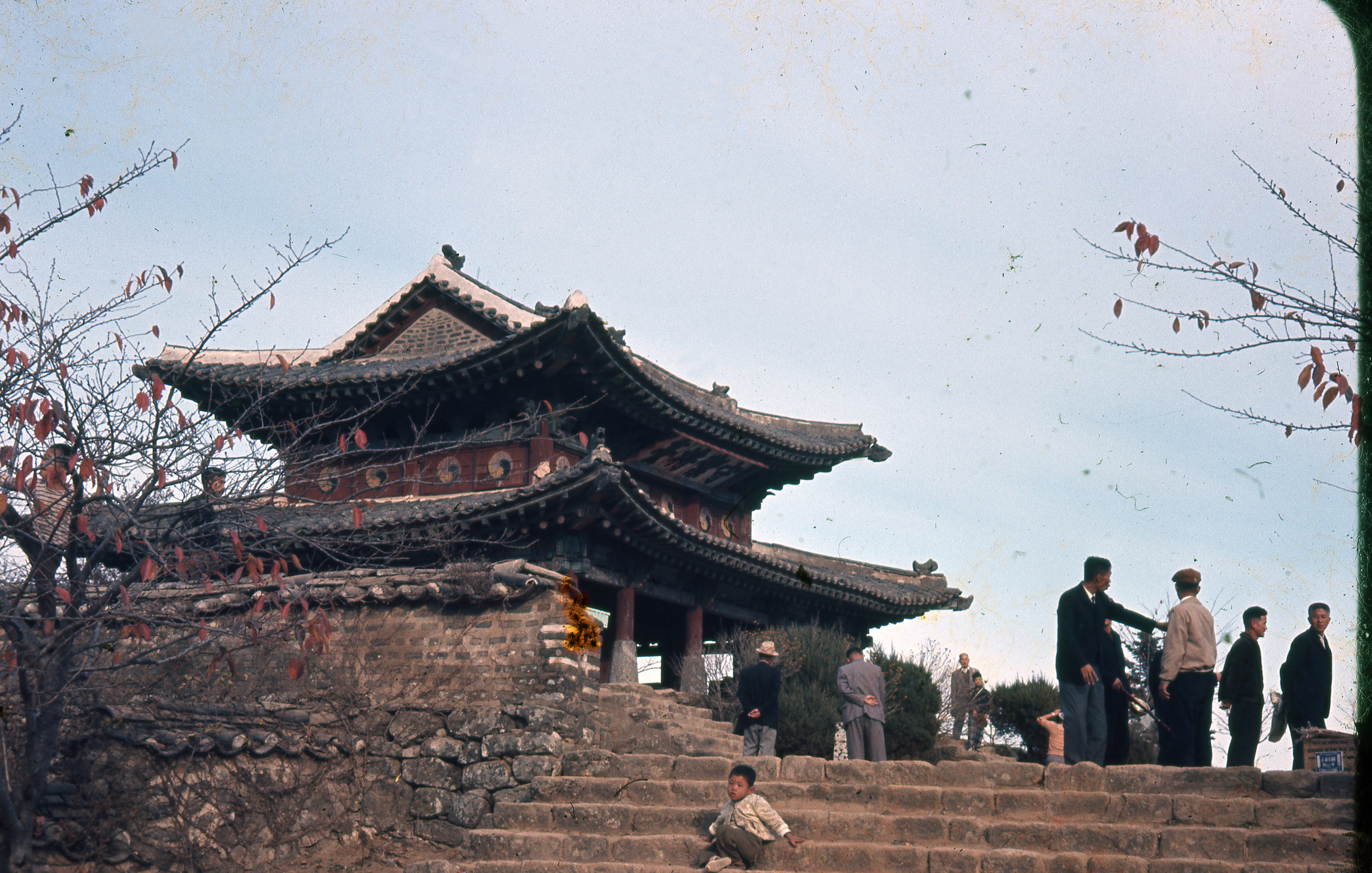
The command post (1959)

The fortress played a role in a number of historic events. In the early 20th century, it was the site of battles between the righteous armies and the Japanese. In 1907, the Japanese destroyed much of the fortress, in order to decrease its utility to Koreans. The fortress lost its function as the town center due to the relocation of the Gwangju County Office in 1917, resulting in a downgrade to a remote mountain village. Then, the fortress suffered population loss and material loss during the 1950–1953 Korean War. Nowadays, Namhansanseong is a tourist attraction, after undergoing large-scale wall restorations and being designated as a provincial park since the 1970s. It has seen a dramatic increase in the number of restaurants and various visitor facilities since the 1980s. The Emergency Palace and the Royal Ancestral Shrine within the fortress have been actively restored based on various studies on Namhansanseong since the 1990s, and it was listed on the World Heritage tentative list in 2010. It was inscribed on the UNESCO World Heritage list in 2014.

Since the 17th century, Namhansanseong has been managed and preserved by the residents for generations. Most fortress towns in Korea underwent severe deformation and change during Japanese colonial times and the period of industrialization and urbanization, resulting in losing their original layout and forms. However, Namhansanseong retained its original layout because the Japanese colonial government relocated the administrative functions and demolished its military functions in the earlier stage of colonization, leaving it as an isolated mountain village thereafter.

== Conservation management ==
The Namhansanseong World Heritage Centre is responsible for managing and monitoring the cultural heritage of Namhansanseong, while the Namhansanseong Provincial Park Office is responsible for managing and monitoring visitor facilities within Namhansanseong and the provincial park area, in accordance with the 2012 Basic Plan on Comprehensive Improvement of Namhansanseong.

== Protection and management requirements ==
Namhansanseong is protected under the Cultural Heritage Protection Act (CHP Act) and the Natural Park Act on the national level. There are also specific ordinances and regulations at the province and city levels. On the basis of the CHP Act, the entire property is designated as a historic site and has a buffer zone surrounding the area with limitations and regulations on development and construction. The entire heritage and buffer zone is also protected as a Provincial Park covering a wider area. Under these frameworks, a Conservation Management Plan has been established to ensure the long-term protection of the fortress and the town within. A special independent entity called the Namhansanseong World Heritage Centre is responsible for the overall management of its heritage in cooperation with the Namhansanseong Provincial Park Office, the residents, local governments, experts and the central government.

Financial support comes from the national and provincial governments, and the projects are managed and operated by the Namhansanseong World Heritage Centre. A monitoring system controls the appropriate use and execution of financial resources and proposed plans.

The current status of conservation can be evaluated in three components called the military component, the governing component, and the folk component. The military component includes the fortress walls and structures, outer walls, Chimgwaejeong Arsenal, and Buddhist temples. The governing component comprises Jwajeon Shrine, Usil Shrine site, the Emergency Palace, Jwaseungdang Hall and the site of Inhwagwan Guest house. The folk component includes steles, pavilions, and intangible heritage such as rituals and rites. All these subcomponents are recorded and are managed appropriately for the form and type of heritage.

Threats to preservation of the site include developmental pressures, environmental pressures, natural disasters, risk preparedness, visitor pressure and land use. Development pressures are relatively low for Namhansanseong as the property area and buffer zones are effectively controlled by the CHP Act, the Natural Park Act and urban management planning. Visitor pressure is perhaps the highest risk factor in Namhansanseong. For the sustainable conservation of the fortress areas, preventive measures include studies on carrying capacity, regular estimation of expected visitors, and utilizing planning mechanisms with legal instruments.

== Gallery ==
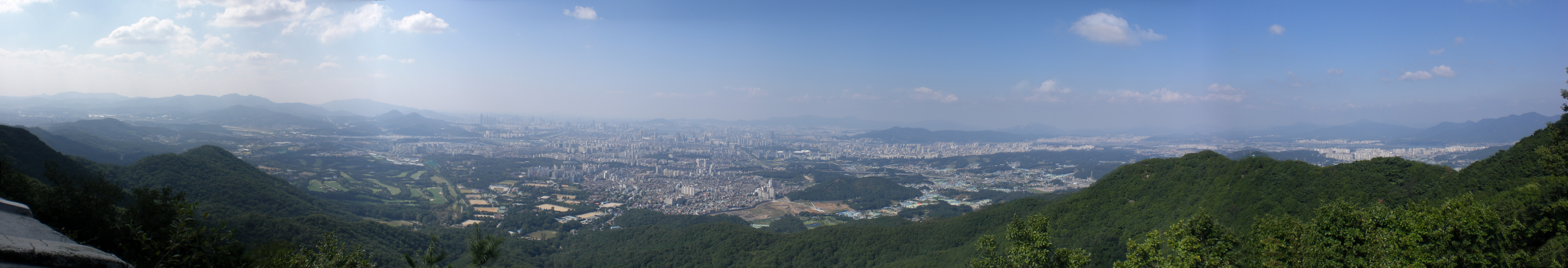
View of downtown Seoul from the fortress wall
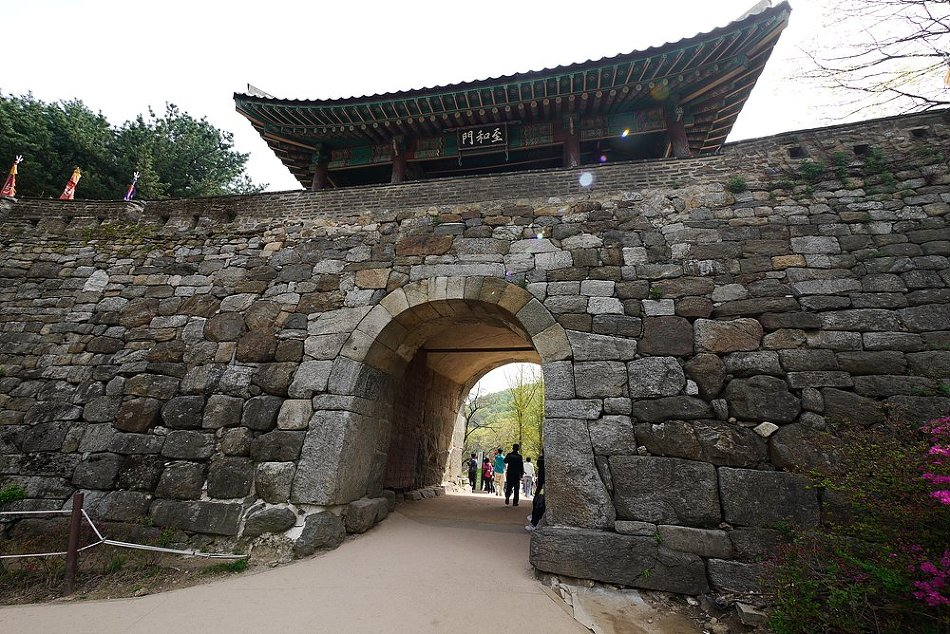
South gate of the fortress (2010)

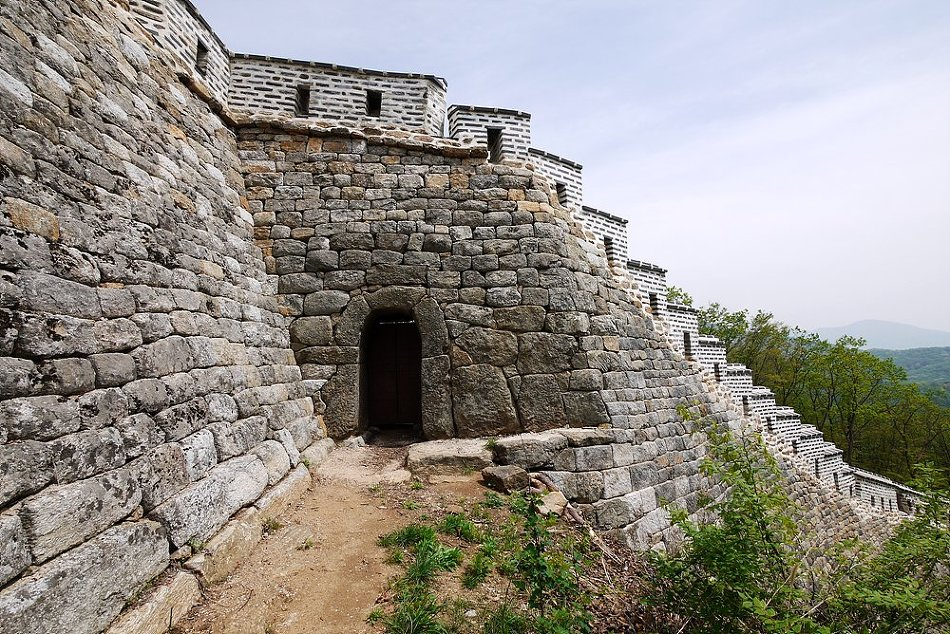
Gate no. 10 (2010)

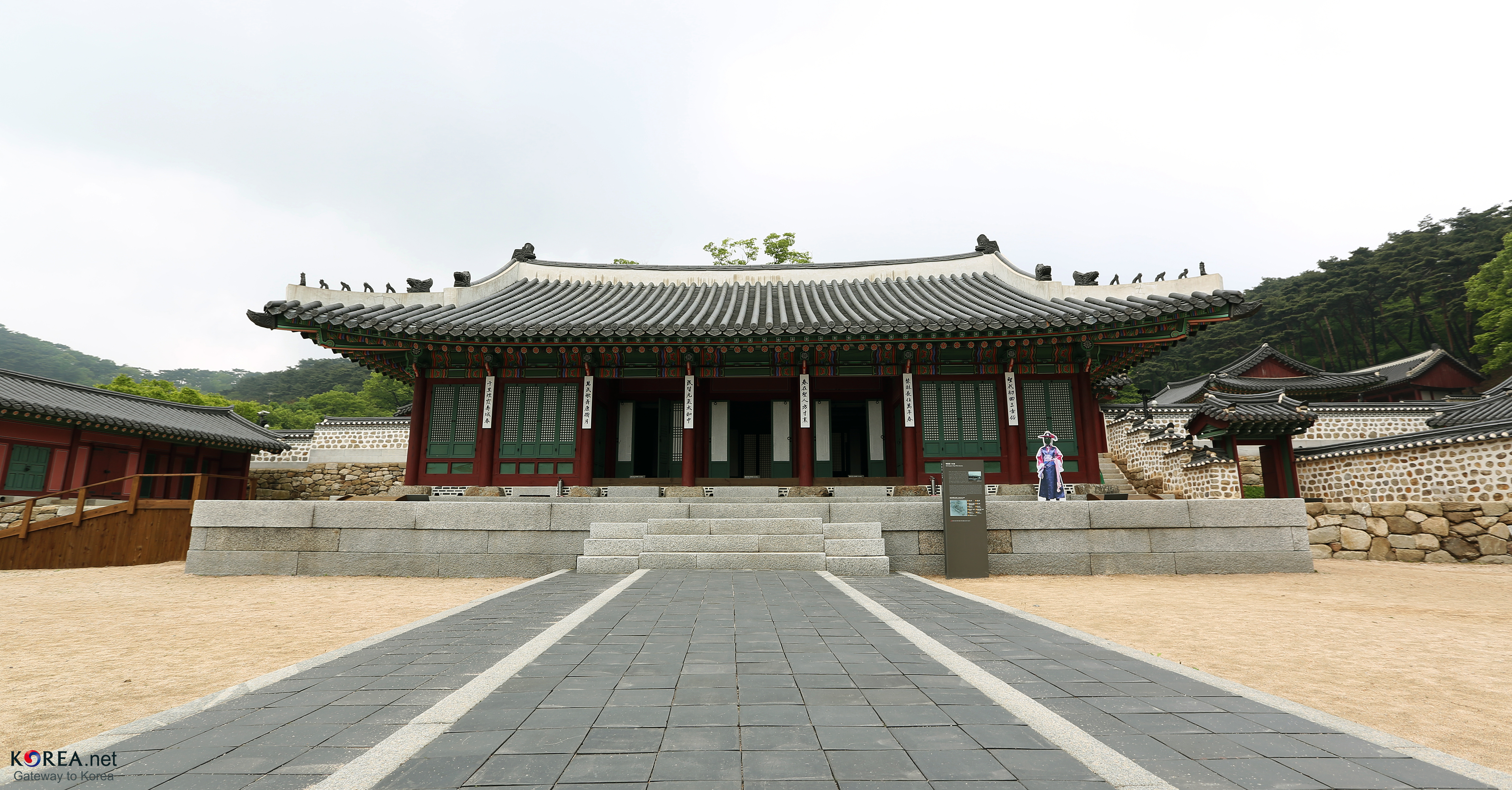
Emergency Palace (2014)

== In media and literature ==
- The novel Namhansanseong by Kim Hoon is based on the Second Manchu invasion of Korea in 1636, where King Injo of Joseon took refuge in the fortress.
- The 2009 musical Namhansanseong, based on the novel of the same name, focuses on the lives of common people and their spirit of survival during harsh situations. It starred Yesung of boy band Super Junior as villain Jung Myung-soo, a servant-turned-interpreter. It was performed from 9 October to 14 November at Seongnam Arts Center Opera House.
- Dae Jang Geum (2003)
- Dong Yi (TV series) (2010)
- The Slave Hunters (2010)
- Nobody's Daughter Haewon (2013)
- The Fortress, a 2017 film directed by Hwang Dong-hyuk, the Korean title of which is the name of this fortress itself (Namhansanseong).
- My Dearest (TV series 2023 - early episodes)

== See also ==
- Korean fortress
- Bukhansanseong
- History of Korea
- List of fortresses in Korea
- Hwaseong Fortress
