= Hwangnyong Fortress =

Stone fortress in Nampo, North Korea

- Hangul: 황룡산성
- Hanja: 皇龍山城
- RR: Hwangnyongsanseong
- MR: Hwangnyongsansŏng

Hwangryong Fortress (Korean: 황룡산성; Hanja: 皇龍山城) is a stone fortress of Goguryeo located in what is now Ryonggang county, Nampo in North Korea. It is designated as "No.37 National Treasure of North Korea". It is about 10-11 metres high, 6-8 metres in width and has a 6.6 kilometre circumference.

== History ==
The fortress played a role to protect the capital Pyongyang during Goguryeo's control in the west side. The wall connects 8 major peaks and hilly area of Oseok mountain. According to Samguksagi, the fortress was enlarged several times from the early 5th century, which was followed by additional construction of stronghold during Gwanggaeto the Great. Later Jangsu of Goguryeo officially transferred the capital to Pyeongyang, while series of fortresses were constructed later this time.

Since the site is quite critical for the defense of northern area of Korean peninsula, the importance was not overlooked by the later kings. In 1675, Sukjong of Joseon reestablished northern part of this fortress to strengthen the national defense. That is to build exterior walls along 3 major gates of the castle, only except for the east side. Easter gate does not have anterior walls, either.

== Notes ==
- Media Korea studies
- KOCCA
