= Namhansan =

Mountain in South Korea

Coordinates: 37°28′16″N 127°10′56″E

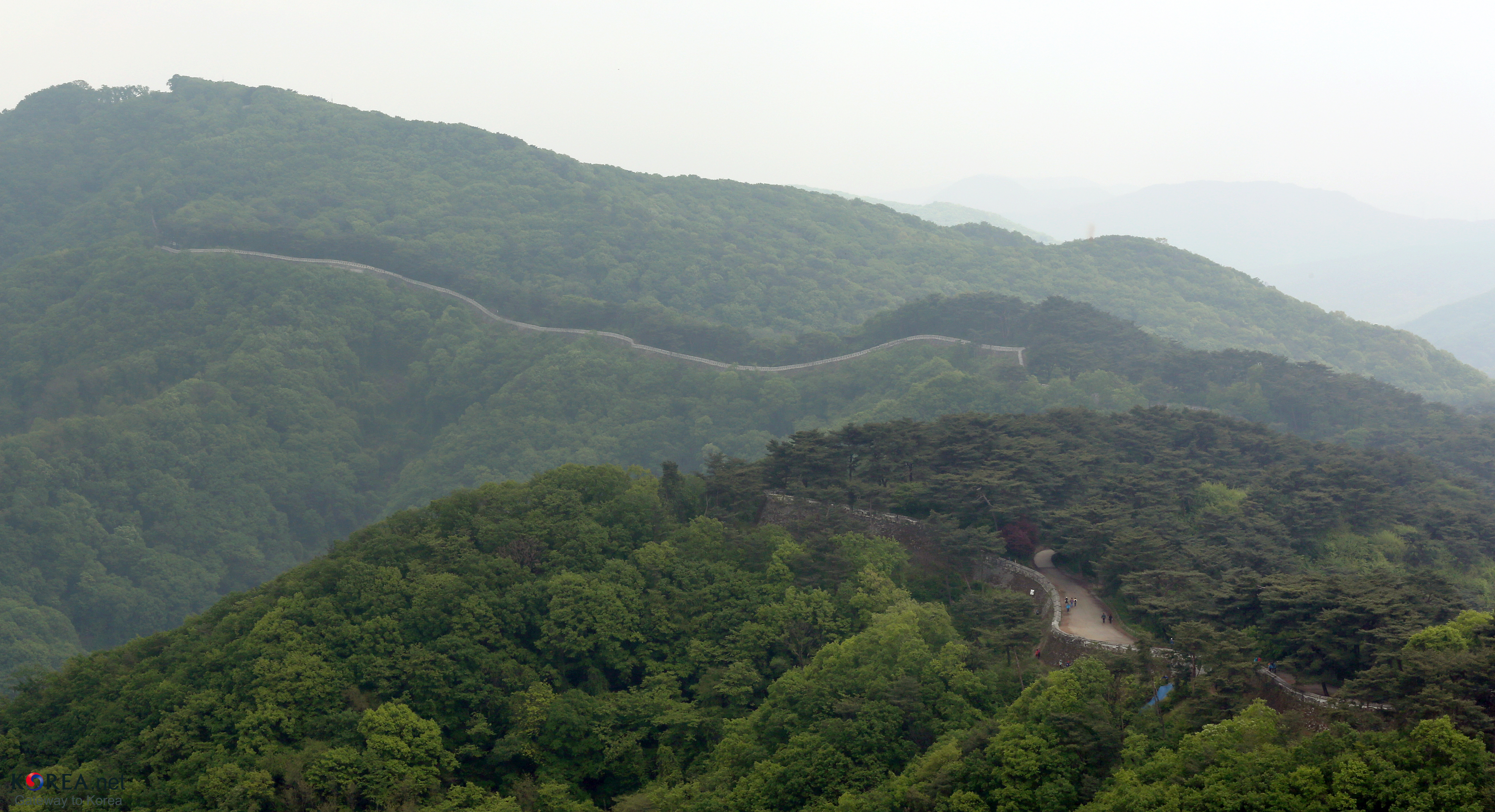
- The Namhansanseong fortress walls along the mountain (2014)

Geography
- Location within Seoul Location within South Korea
- Country: South Korea
- Province: Gyeonggi

Korean name
- Hangul: 남한산
- Hanja: 南漢山
- RR: Namhansan
- MR: Namhansan

Namhansan (Korean: 남한산) is a mountain in Gyeonggi Province, South Korea. It lies on the border between southern Seoul and Gwangju, Gyeonggi. An old stone-walled fortress named Namhansanseong stands at the top, and is a tourist attraction.

== Gallery ==
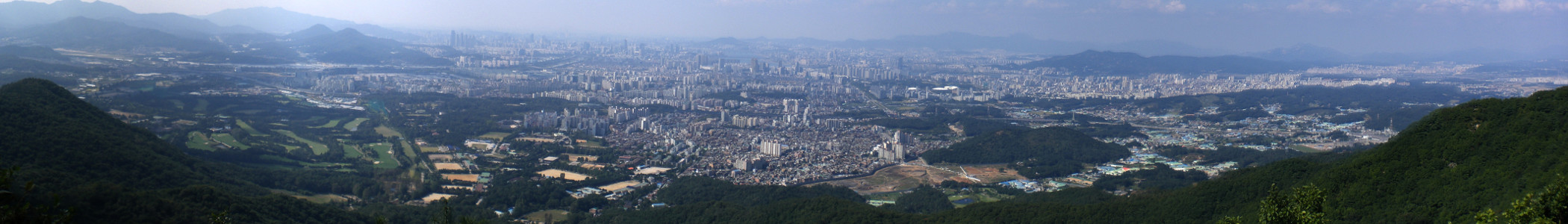
Panorama of Seoul from the mountain (2013)

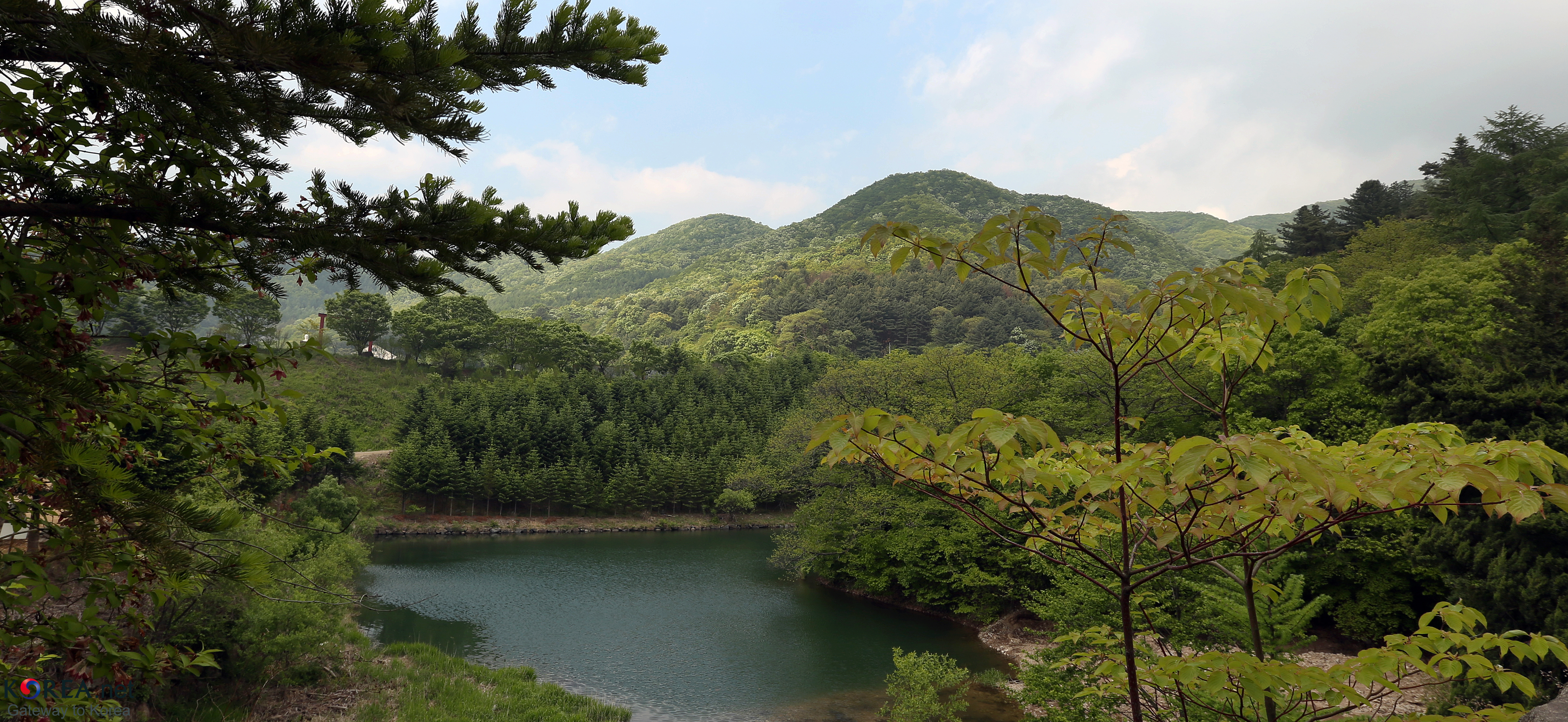
Nature of the mountain (2014)

== See also ==
- List of mountains in Korea
- Geography of South Korea
