= Toksansŏng =

Fortress in Osan, South Korea

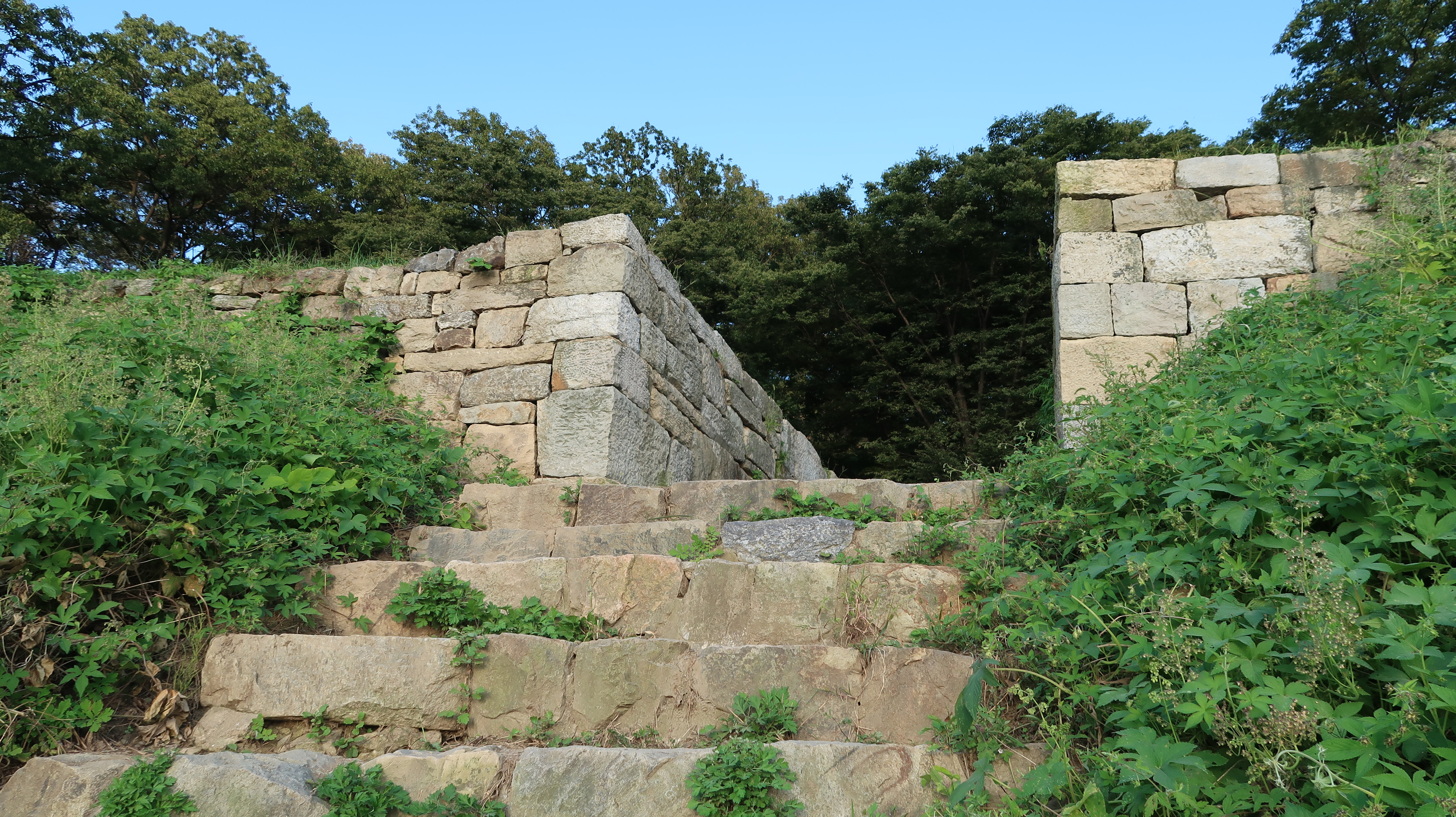
- South Gate of Doksan Fortress
- Interactive map of Toksansŏng
- 37°11′1″N 127°1′10″E
- Type: Hill Fort
- Location: Osan, South Korea

History
- Built: Before 373 (Baekje period)
- Rebuilt: 1602 (as a stone fortress)

Site notes
- Area: 75,254 m^{2} (810,030 ft^{2})
- Restored: 1950s, 1980s

Historic Sites of South Korea
- Official name: Doksanseong Fortress and Semadae Site, Osan
- Designated: 29 August 1964
- Reference no.: 140

Korean name
- Hangul: 독산성
- Hanja: 禿山城
- RR: Doksanseong
- MR: Toksansŏng

Toksansŏng (Korean: 독산성; Hanja: 禿山城) or Doksan Fortress is an early modern Korean hill fort located in Osan, South Korea. It is notable for the Siege of Toksan in 1593, during which the Japanese attacking forces failed to defeat general Gwon Yul in the Imjin War. Within the fort, there are significant landmarks such as the Bujek Buddhist Temple and Semadae, a monument commemorating Gwon Yul's victory. The site is designated as a Historic Site of South Korea. Each September, the annual Doksanseong Culture and Art Festival takes place near the fort.
