= Korean fortress =

Korean fortresses are fortifications constructed by Koreans since the Three Kingdoms of Korea period. Koreans developed a unique and distinct fortress tradition. Korea, beginning with Goguryeo, has been called "a country of fortresses"; almost 2,400 mountain fortress sites have been found in Korea.

There are numerous types of Korean fortresses, including sanseong (mountain fortress), eupseong (city fortress), pyeongjiseong, gwanseong, jangseong, chaekseong, and more.

== History ==
Korean fortresses were based on a stone culture and built with stones on natural mountainous terrain; therefore, they are conceptually completely different from Chinese fortresses, which were based on an earth culture and built with bricks and stamped earth on flat land. Korean fortresses were invented by Goguryeo and spread to Baekje and Silla, and then inherited and further developed by Goryeo and then Joseon.

== Sites ==
Almost 2,400 mountain fortress sites have been found in Korea.

Goguryeo fortress ruins have been found in about 170 sites to date, including in China; one of the most notable among them is Ansi Fortress, which successfully defended against Tang Taizong during the Goguryeo–Tang War. Goguryeo fortress ruins have also been found in present-day Mongolia.

Korean-style fortresses can be found in Japan, which were constructed and supervised by immigrants of Baekje origin.

== Characteristics and Features ==
Most Korean fortresses are single layered wall structure surrounding a city, town or a village. These city walls are augmented by a mountain fortress or two nearby. An example is the Seoul City Wall, which is connected to the Bukhansanseong Mountain Fortress on the north, and with Namhansanseong Mountain Fortress across the Han River on the south side. The purpose of the mountain fortress was to enable the inhabitants of the city, town, or village to escape into during emergencies caused by war or insurgencies. As most invaders of Korea were mounted archers from the North, the invaders lacked the experience, capacity or the know how to conduct a mountain siege. This is why mountain fortresses are the most common type of fortresses in Korea.

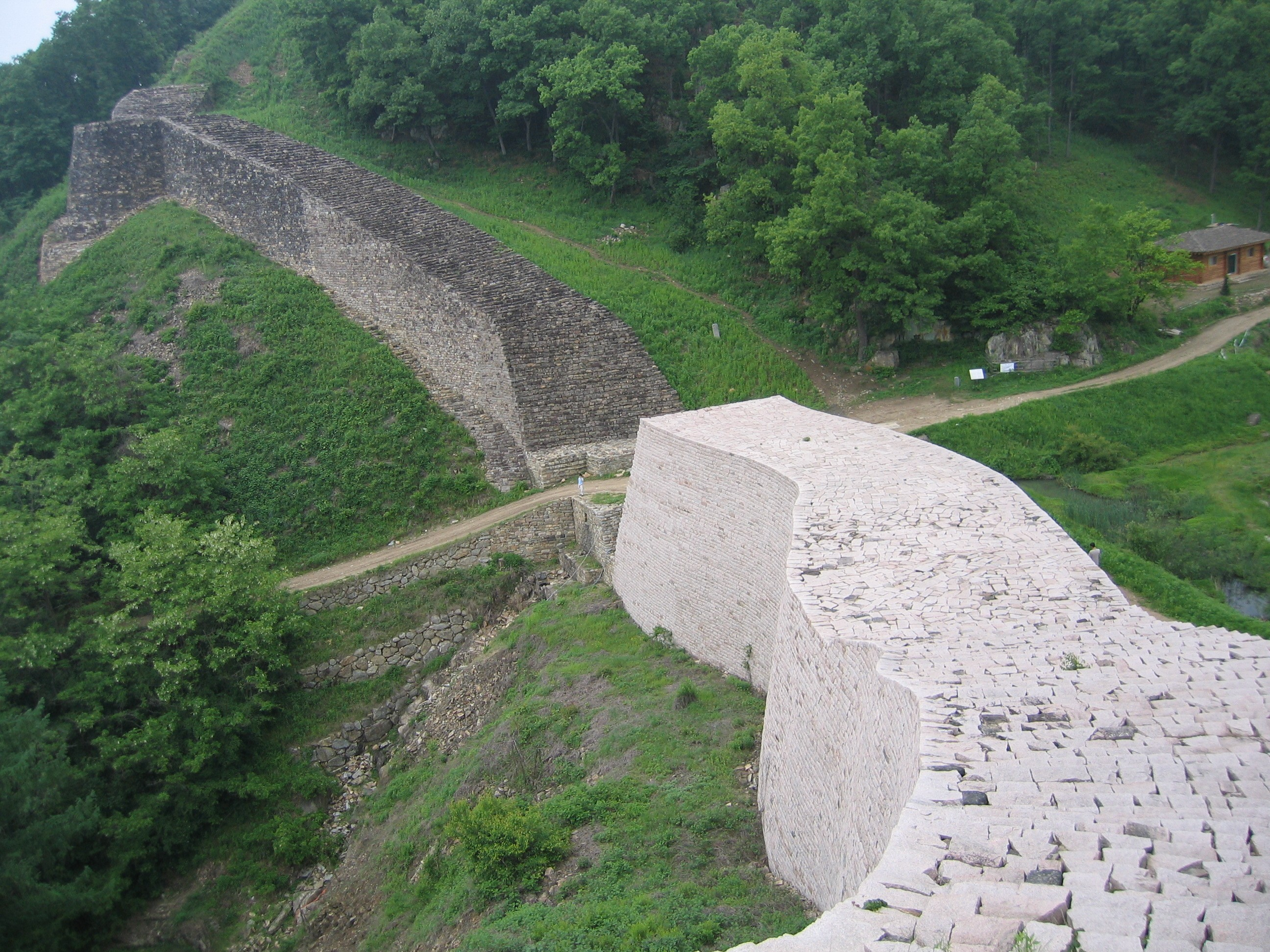
Samnyeonsanseong, a Silla mountain fortress in central Korea, built in AD 470 as a defense against Goguryeo Kingdom.

Mountain Fortresses

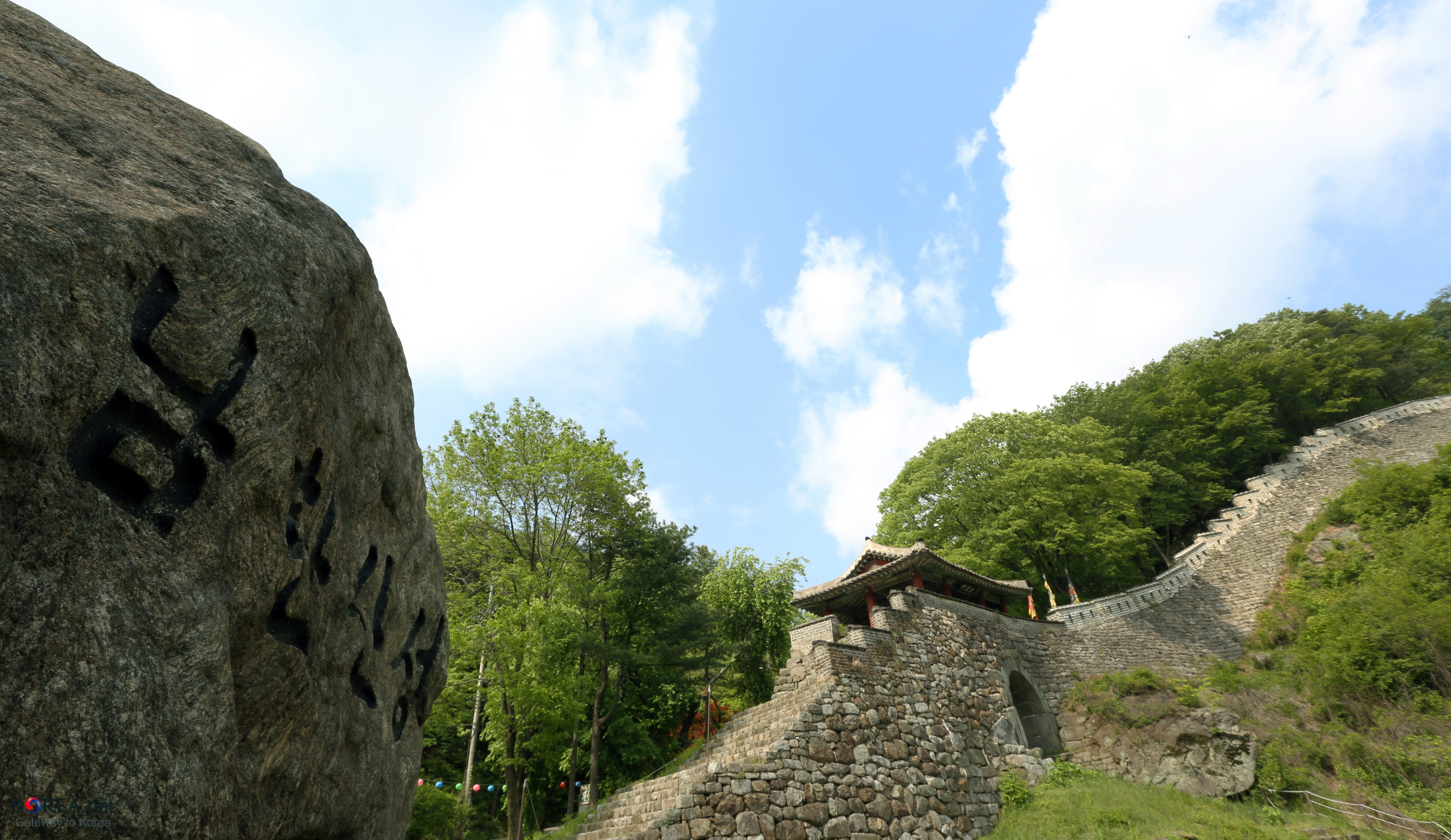
Namhansanseong was the site of a siege by the Manchu invaders, where the Korean King surrendered to the Manchus after a 41 days siege in 1637.

As mountain fortresses relied on the steep terrain of Korean mountains for defense, they generally lack muti-layered walls, and generally have one main entrance with one or more secret entrances. Some of the larger ones may contain a Buddhist temple inside, whose monks were expected to upkeep the wall maintenance and small plots of farms, as well as one or more wells within the mountain fortress. Some of the larger ones contained HaengGung, which are small Royal Palaces designed to accommodate the King who may have fled to that location. Both Namhansanseong and Bukhansanseong contain HaengGungs, as does the Jindo Sanseong in Jindo among many others.

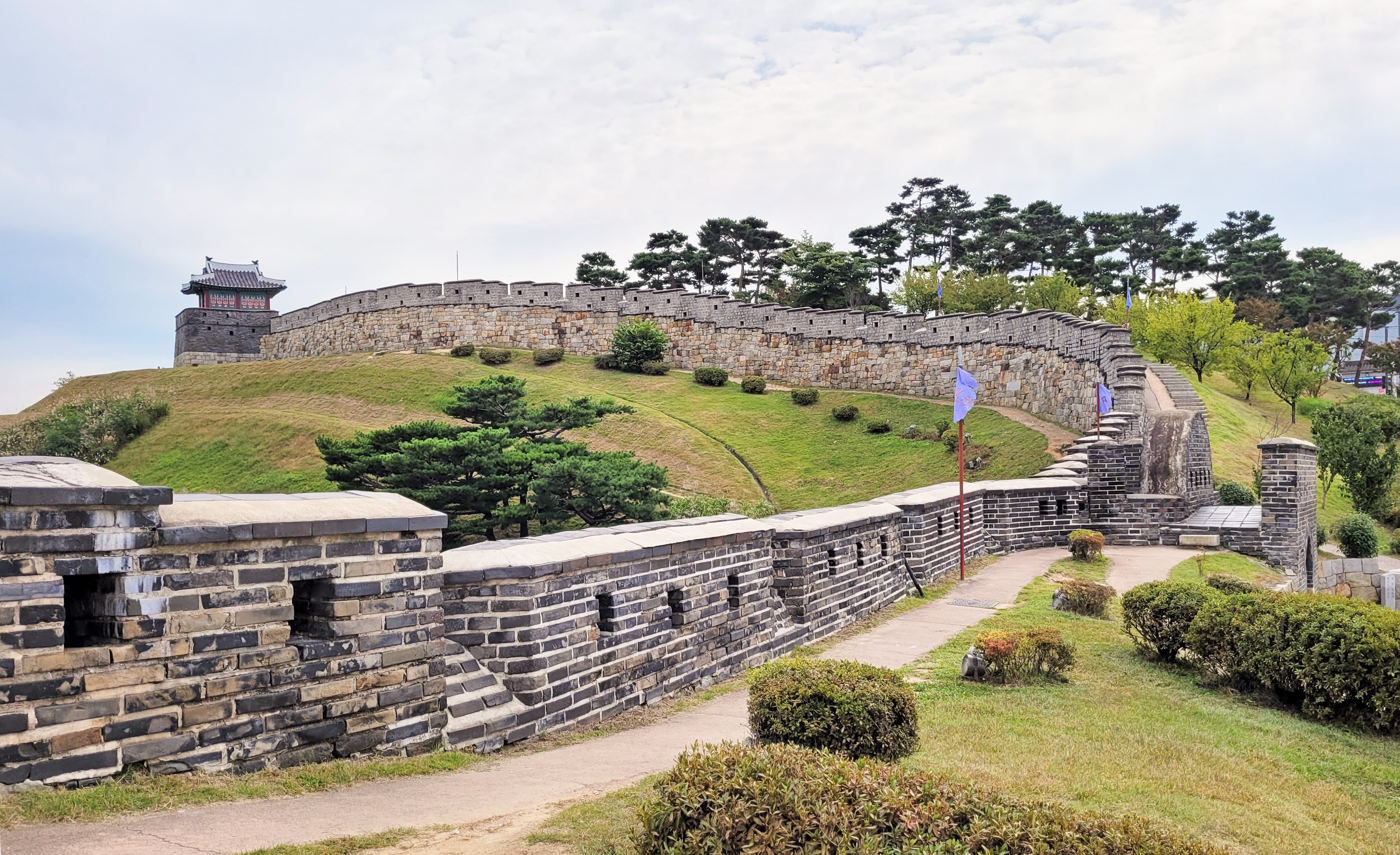
Hwaseong Fortress of Suwon, built in 1796. This is a city wall.

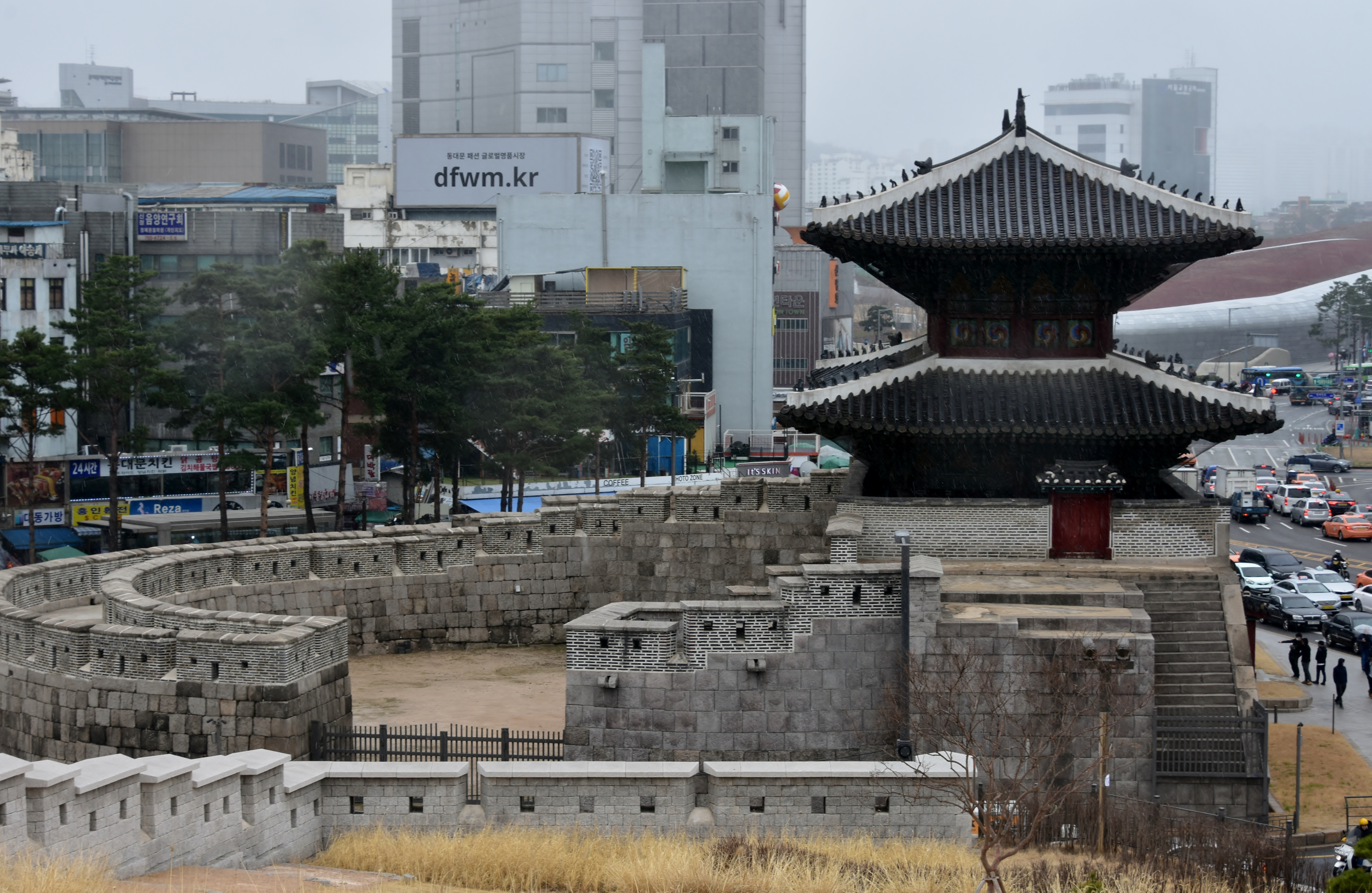
This is an example of a walled city gate. A smaller wall protects the entry into the city gate. Dongdaemun, Seoul, the East Gate, built in 1398.

City Walls

Walled cities in Korea are characterized by short and straight walls, normally no taller than 10 feet. Unlike the Japanese Walls, Korean walls are upright, due to having no earthquakes on the peninsula. Korean walls are much shorter than the walls in China, possibly due to long periods of peace during Joseon dynasty, and also due to relying primarily on mountain fortresses as refuge. Some city walls have a small outer wall guarding the gate itself. Dongdaemun (the East Gate of Seoul,) as well as Paldalmun, the South Gate of Suwon, a part of the Hwaseong Fortress.

Water Gate is a feature found in some Korean city walls, which allow for the flow of river water into and out of the city.

Towers are rare, not existing in the entire city wall of Seoul, but they do exist in the more recently constructed Hwaseong Fortress.

=== UNESCO ===
Hwaseong Fortress and Namhansanseong are UNESCO World Heritage Sites.

== Lists ==
- List of fortresses in Korea
- List of Korean fortresses in China
- Korean-style fortresses in Japan
- Japanese castles in Korea
- Cheolli Jangseong

== Gallery ==
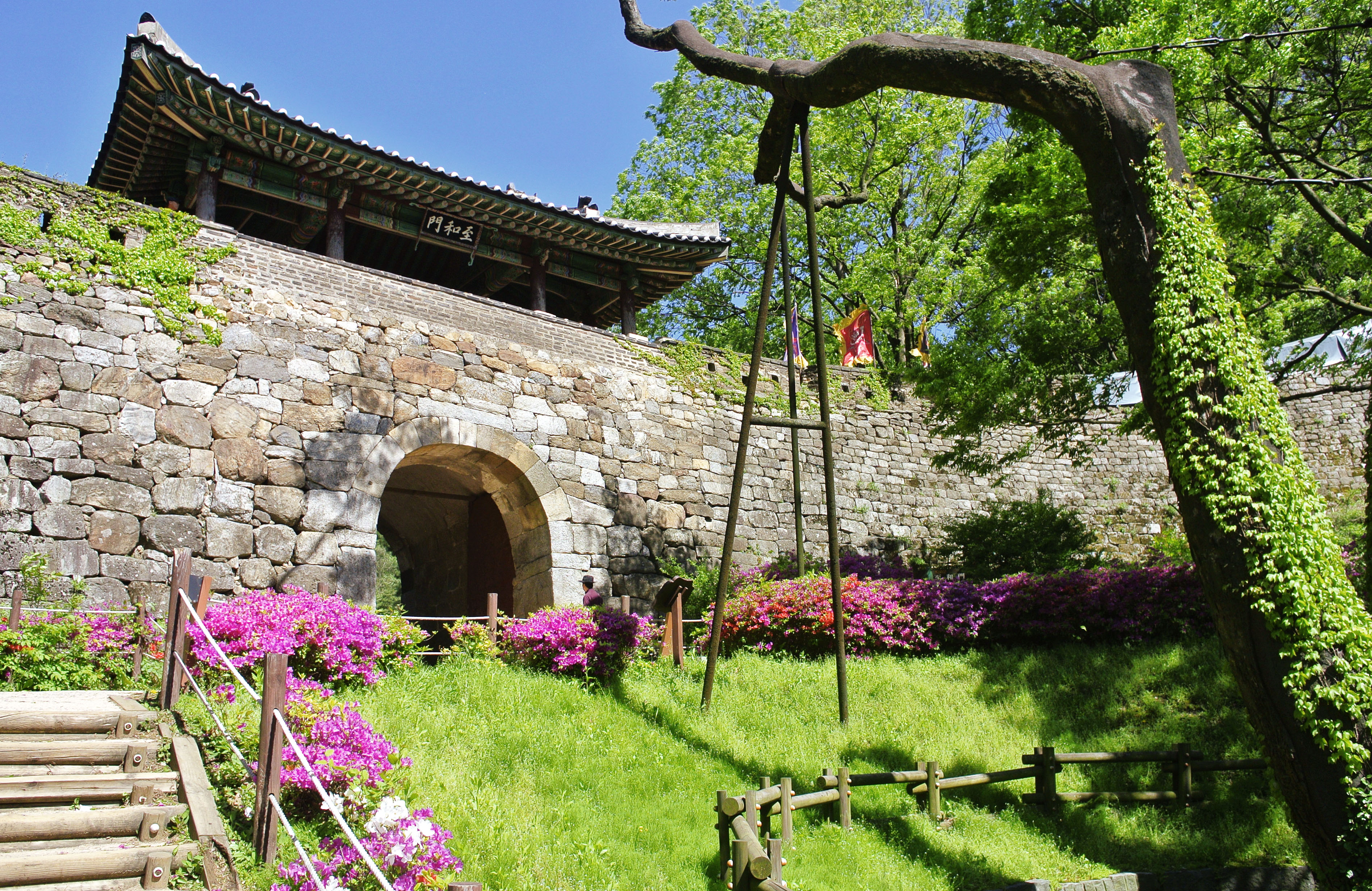
Namhan Mountain Fortress

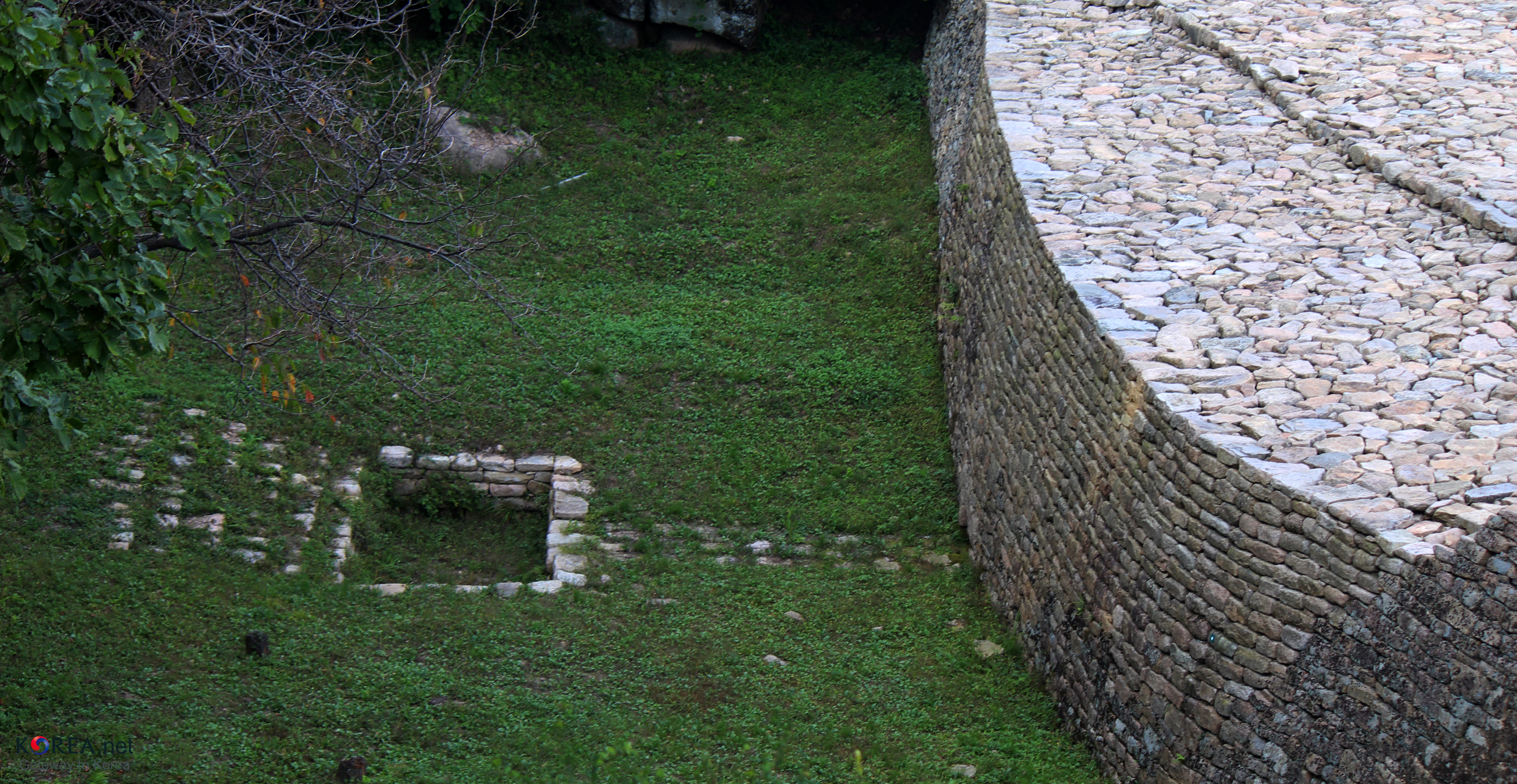
Gyeonhwon Mountain Fortress ruins

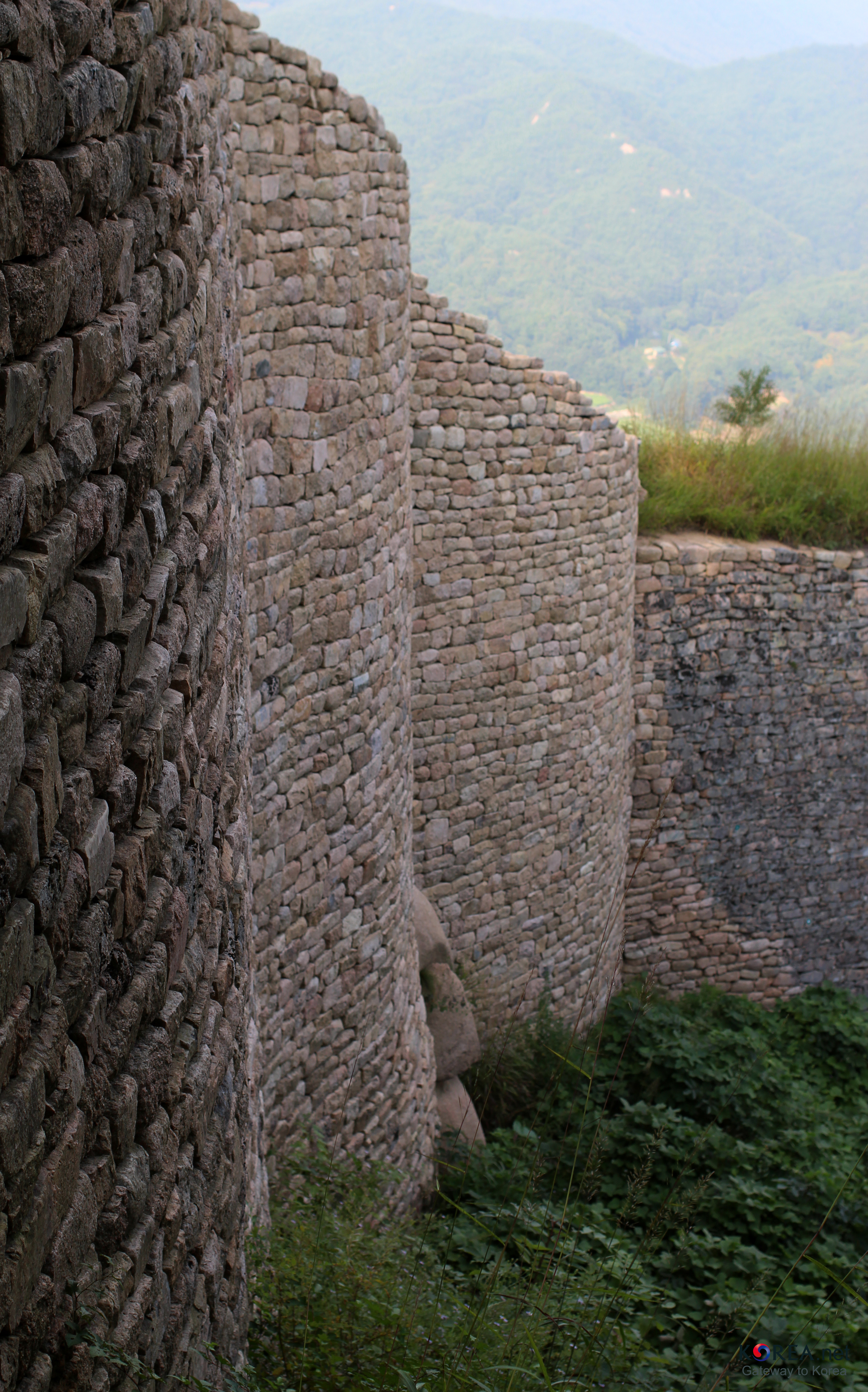
Gyeonhwon Mountain Fortress ruins
