= Geumseong-dong =

Coordinates: 35°15′12″N 129°3′23″E

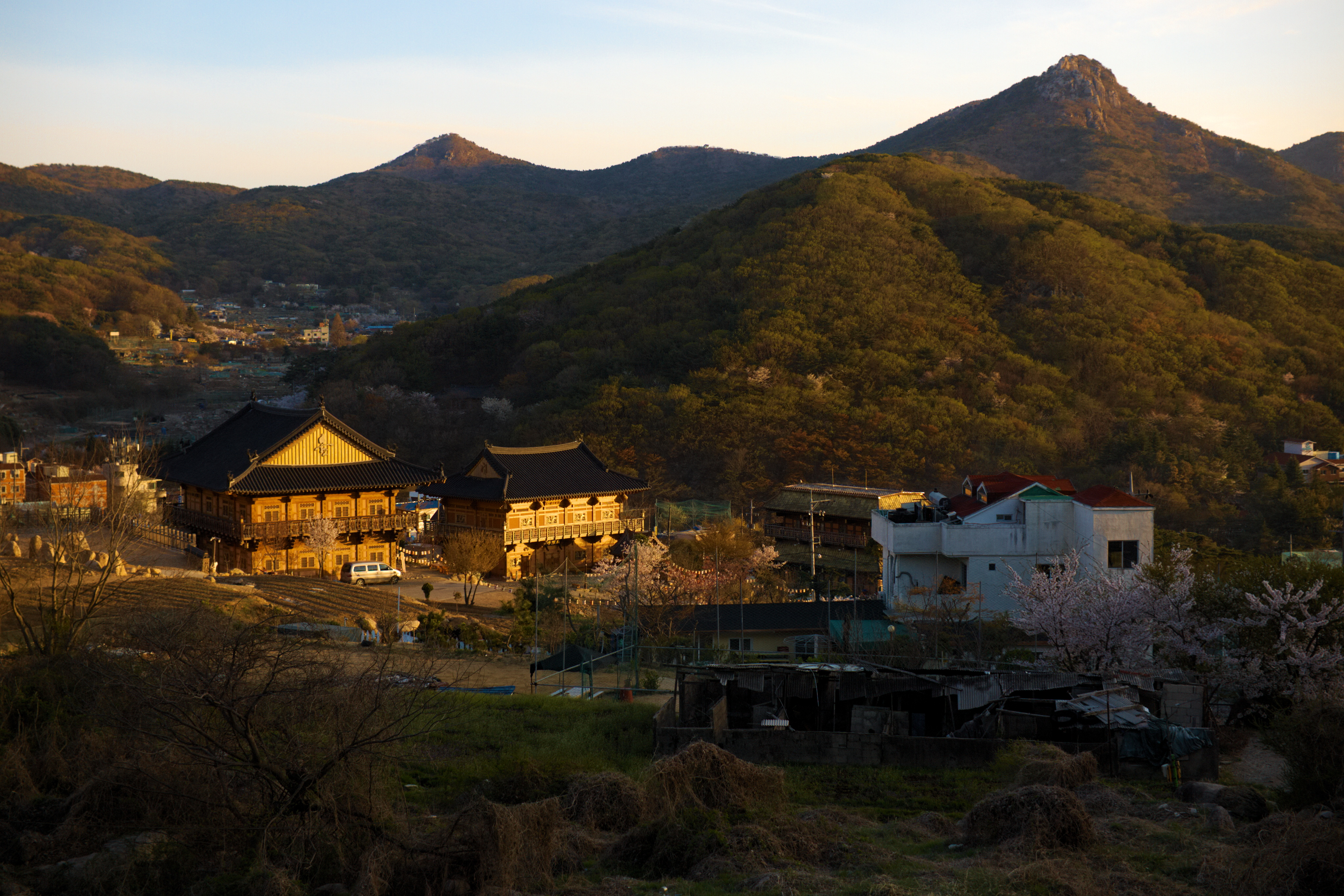
- A view of the village of Sanseong, looking south towards Pari-bong.

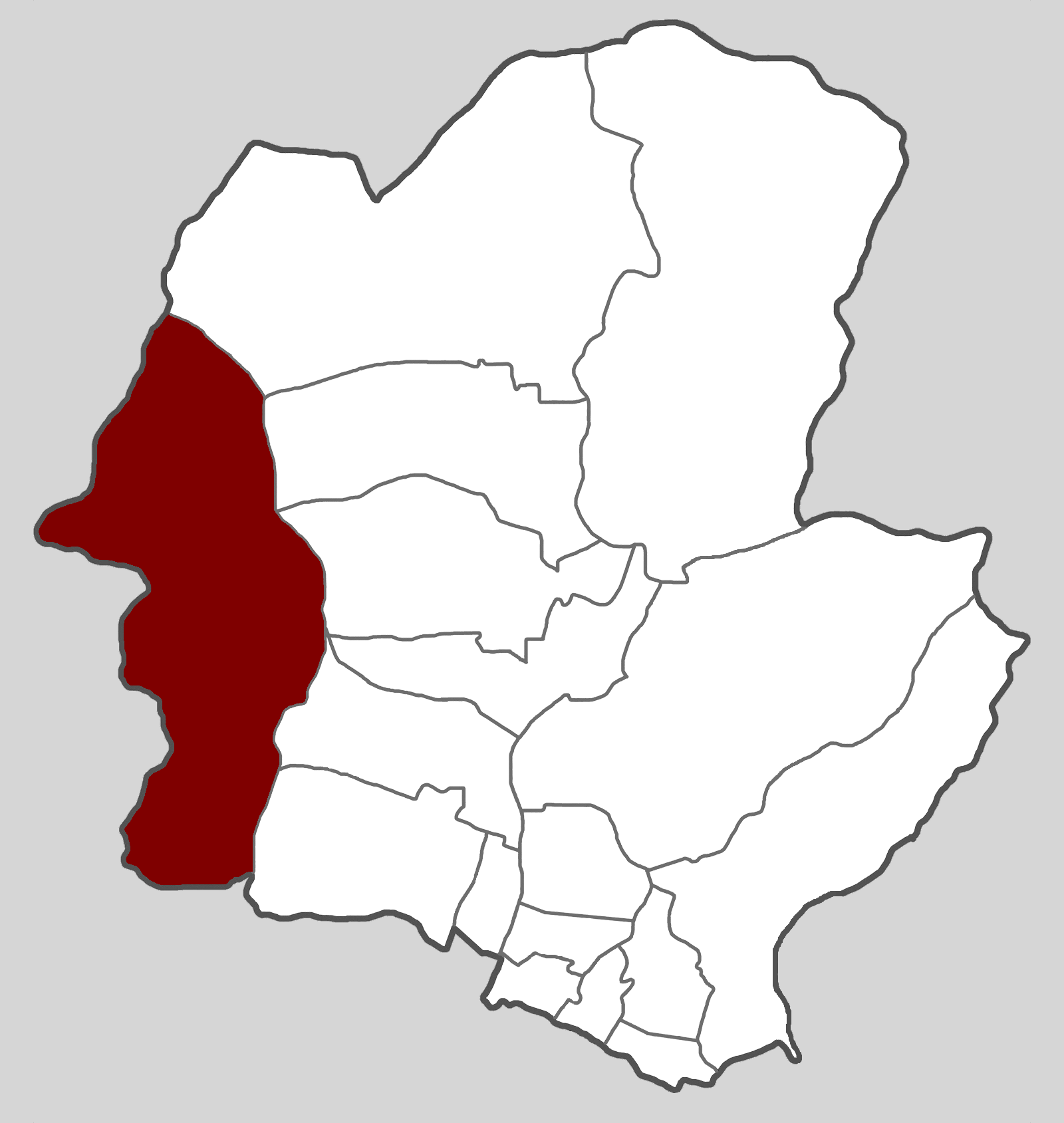
- Country: South Korea
- Administrative divisions: 1 administrative dong

Area
  - Total: 8.41 km^{2} (3.25 sq mi)

Population (2011)
  - Total: 1,211
  - Density: 144/km^{2} (370/sq mi)

Korean name
- Hangul: 금성동
- Hanja: 金城洞
- RR: Geumseong-dong
- MR: Kŭmsŏng-dong

Geumseong-dong (Korean: 금성동) is a dong (neighborhood) in Geumjeong District, Busan, South Korea. A lightly populated district, it is situated entirely within the mountain range of Geumjeongsan. It is bounded to the west by Hwamyeong-dong and Geumgok-dong in Buk District, to the northwest by Dong-myeon of Yangsan City, to the east by Cheongnyong-dong, Namsan-dong, Guseo-dong, and Jangjeon-dong of Geumjeong District, and to the south by Oncheon-dong in Dongnae District. The northernmost point in Geumseong-dong is at Godang-bong, the highest peak in Geumjeongsan.

Geumseong-dong is a rural district connected by public transit to the rest of Busan by bus service only. Despite covering a comparatively large area, Geumseong-dong is not subdivided into additional "administrative dong" due to its low population. There are two points of access to the dong where the main road, Sanseong-ro, connects to Hwamyeong-dong in the west, and Jangjeon-dong in the east. The only major area of settlement within the dong is in the village of Sanseong-myeon (literally "mountain fortress village").

The name Geumseong derives from Geumjeongsanseong, a large mountain fortress built in 1703 that is located largely within the dong.

== See also ==
- Geography of South Korea
- Administrative divisions of South Korea
