= Geumjeong (disambiguation) =

Geumjeong can refer to the following locations in South Korea:

== Busan ==
- Geumjeong-gu, a district in Busan
- Geumjeong Fortress, a fortress in Busan
- Geumjeongsan, a mountain in Busan

== Gyeonggi Province ==
- Geumjeong-dong, a ward in Gunpo City, Gyeonggi Province
- Geumjeong Station, a Seoul Subway station in Gunpo City
