= Nopo =

Nopo may refer to:

== People ==
- Casto Nopo (born 1973), born Casto Nopo Abeso Evuna Ada, Equatorial Guinean professional football manager and former player

== Places ==
- Nopo river, Mozambique
- Nopo-dong (노포동 or 老圃洞, 'Old Garden Neighborhood'), Busan, South Korea, a former dong of the Geumjeong District, now Cheongnyeongnopo-dong
  - Nopo station, South Korea, a station of Busan Metro Line 1 and Yangsan Metro named after the old neighborhood
- North Portland, Oregon, United States, known by the nickname "NoPo"
- North Potomac, Maryland, United States, known by the nickname "NoPo"

== Other ==
- Counter-terrorism Special Force of Iran, known by the acronym "NOPO"
- Nopo or anadenanthera peregrina, a tree
