= Jangjeon-dong =

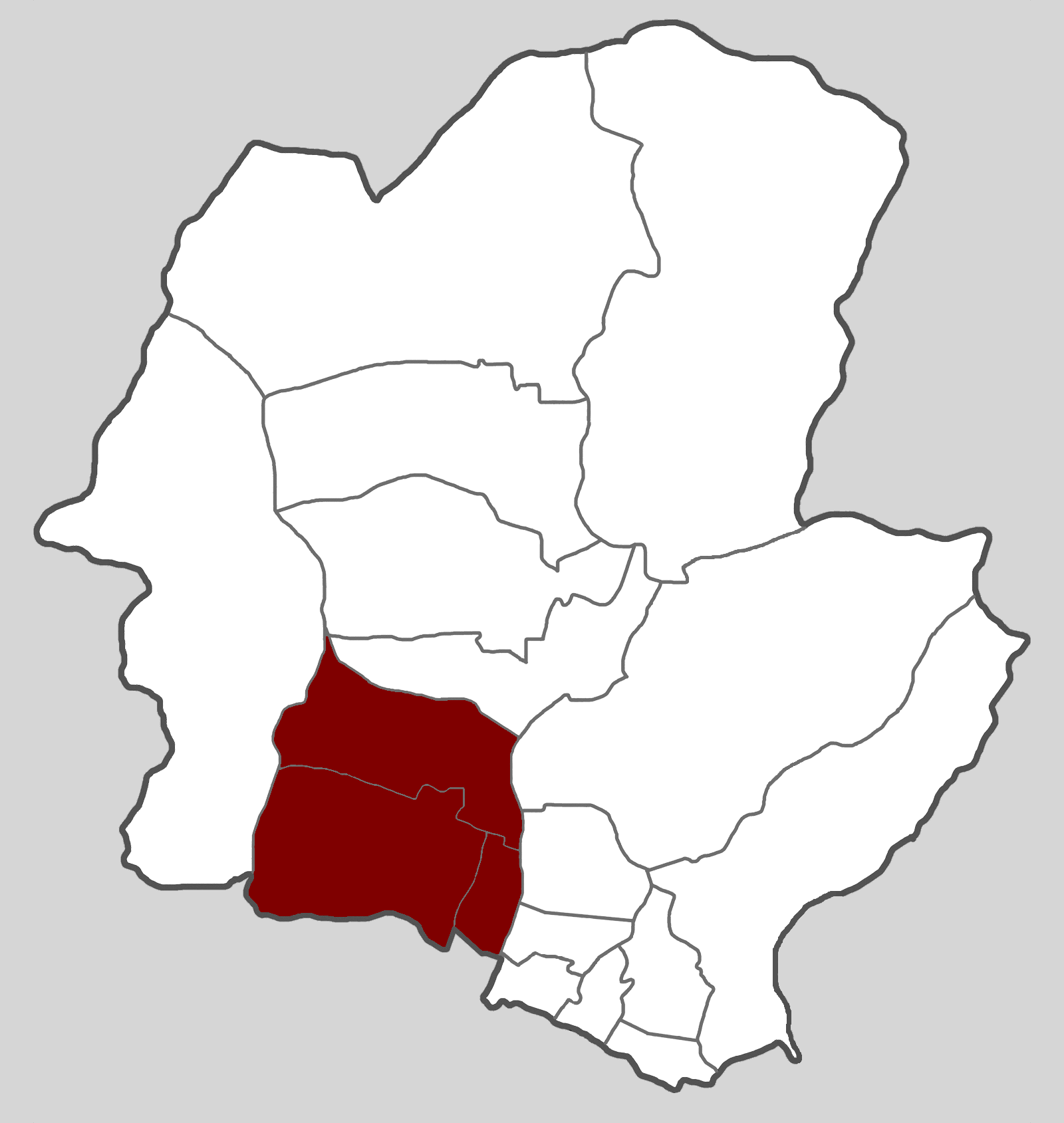
- Country: South Korea
- Administrative divisions: 3 administrative dong

Area
  - Total: 6.01 km^{2} (2.32 sq mi)

Population
  - Total: 39,084
  - Density: 6,503/km^{2} (16,840/sq mi)

Korean name
- Hangul: 장전동
- Hanja: 長箭洞
- RR: Jangjeon-dong
- MR: Changjŏn-dong

Jangjeon-dong (Korean: 장전동) is a dong (neighborhood) in Geumjeong District, Busan, South Korea. A heavily populated district, it is situated between the slopes of Geumjeongsan and the valley of Oncheoncheon. It is bounded to the south by Oncheon-dong in Dongnae District and to the north by Guseo-dong. Due to its large population, Jangjeon-dong is divided into three "administrative dong," Jangjeon 1, 2, and 3-dong.

Jangjeon-dong is tightly connected to the Busan transit grid, with Busan Subway Line 1 making two stops, at Pusan National University Station and Jangjeon-dong Station. Jangjeon-dong is home to Pusan National University, a major university in Busan, and to a popular shopping and restaurant district.

The name jangjeon literally means "long arrows." It is believed that the original inhabitants of the Jangjeon village were arrow smiths, making long arrow shafts from the bamboo groves that still flourish on the slopes of Geumjeongsan.

== See also ==
- Geography of South Korea
- Administrative divisions of South Korea
