= Keumjeong High School =

Coordinates: 35.20688°N 129.10727°E

Keumjeong High School 금정고등학교 / 金井高等學校
- Dongnae-gu, Busan; South Korea

Information
- Type: Public
- Established: December, 1986
- Slogan: Research Truth and Make Ego with Enterprising Spirit (진취적 기상으로, 진리를 탐구하여, 자아를 실현하자.)
- Website: http://www.keumjeong.hs.kr/

Keumjeong High School (Korean: 금정고등학교, Hanja: 金井高等學校), located in Busan, is a high school in South Korea. It was founded in 1986 and chosen as Autonomic Public School. It has a Taekwondo class and its Taekwondo team has won many prizes. This school is supported by the country because it is an Autonomic Public School which is allowed to arrange curricula to increase students' achievements. It was also chosen as a School of Promoting Education.

It is related to Geumjeongsan, but it is not in Geumjeong-gu. At its foundation, it was located in Geumjeong-gu, but its location is not Geumjeong-gu but Dongnae-gu now. Keumjeong High School's symbolic flower is the Japanese apricot flower, its symbolic tree is juniper, its symbolic location is Geum-saem (금샘) which is in Geumjeongsan – this is why it is related to Geumjeongsan. Its symbolic character is Geum-ho (금호).
