= List of Buddhist temples in Busan =

This is a list about Buddhist temples in Busan, South Korea.

Temple	Hangul	Hanja	Location	Order	Link
Gamcheonsa	감천사	甘泉寺	1112, Yeongsan 4-dong, Yeonje-gu	Wonhyo Order	
Gwangmyeongsa	광명사	光明寺	San 44-19, Beomcheon2-dong, Busanjin-gu	Jogye Order	
Gukcheongsa	국청사	國淸寺	397, Geumseong-dong, Geumjeong-gu	Jogye Order	
Geumsusa	금수사	金水寺	843 Choryang-dong, Dong-gu	Wonhyo Order	
Geumyongsa	금용암	金蓉庵	1396-2 Geojae 2-dong, Yeonje-gu	Jogye Order	
Geumjeong Seonwon	금정선원	金井禪院	282, Oncheon 1-dong, Dongnae-gu	Jogye Order	
Mahasa	마하사	摩河寺	2039 Yeonsan 7-dong, Yeonje-gu	Jogye Order	
Myosimsa	묘심사	妙心寺	1174-8, Sujeong-dong, Dong-gu	Jogye Order	
Mireuksa	미륵사	彌勒寺	San 1-1, Geumseong-dong, Geumjeong-gu	Jogye Order	
Beomeosa	범어사	梵魚寺	546, Cheongryong-dong, Geumjeong-gu	Jogye Order	
Beopryunsa (Busan)	법륜사	法輪寺	239-2 Chilsan-dong, Dongnae-gu	Jogye Order	
Bulgokam	불곡암	佛谷庵	949-14 Daeyeon 4-dong, Nam-gu	Jogye Order	
Seonamsa (Busan)	선암사	仙岩寺	628 Buam 3-dong Busanjin-gu	Jogye Order	[]
Seongamsa	성암사	聖岩寺	San 74-1, Munhyeon 1-dong, Nam-gu	Jogye Order	
Anjeoksa	안적사	安寂寺	692 Naeri, Gijang-eup, Gijang-gun, Busan	Jogye Order	
Yaksusa	약수사		21-2, Deokpo 2-dong, Sasang-gu	Beophwa Order	[]
Yaksuam (Busan)	약수암	藥水庵	21-2, Deokpo 2-dong, Sasang-gu	Beophwa Order	
Yeongdeungsa	연등사	燃燈寺	839-3 Jwacheon-dong, Dong-gu	Jogye Order	
Yeongjuam	영주암	瀛洲庵	950 Mangmi 1-dong, Suyeong-gu	Jogye Order	
Okryeon Seonwon	옥련선원	玉蓮禪院	372-2 Minrak-dong, Suyeong-gu	Okryeon Seonwon	
Unsusa	운수사	雲水寺	San 5 Mora 3-dong, Sasang-gu	Jogye Order	
Wolmyeongsa (Busan)	월명사	月明寺	San 28-1, Hoenggye-ri, Ilgwang-myeon, Gijang-gun, Busan	Taego Order	
Jangansa (Busan)	장안사	長安寺	598 Jangan-eup, Jangan-ri, Gijang-gun, Busan	Jogye Order	
Jeongsuam (Busan)	정수암	淨水庵	5 Geumseong-dong, Geumjeong-gu	Jogye Order	
Cheokpanam	척판암	擲板庵	San 53-1, Jangan-ri, Jangan-eup, Gijang-gun, Busan	Jogye Order	
Cheongryangsa (Busan)	청량사	淸凉寺	445 Myeongji-dong, Gangseo-gu	Jogye Order	
Hyewonjeongsa	혜원정사	慧苑精舍	113-1 Yeonsan 4-dong, Yeonje-gu	Jogye Order	

== See also ==
- List of Buddhist temples in Seoul
