= Dongnae Girls' High School =

Dongnae Girls' High School 동래여자고등학교

Location
- 20 Cheyukgongwon-ro, Geumjeong-gu, Busan; South Korea; 35°14′48″N 129°05′50″E

Information
- Type: Private
- Established: 1895
- Principal: Moon Seong-gyu (문성규)
- Deputy Principal: Choi Byung-gyu (최병규)
- Faculty: 71
- Gender: Girls
- Campus size: 46,530m^{2}
- School Tree: Juniperus chinensis
- School Flower: Royal azalea
- Website: dongnae-gh.hs.kr

Dongnae Girls' High School (Korean: 동래여자고등학교) is a private girls' high school in Bugok-dong, Geumjeong District, Busan, South Korea. Established in 1895 in Jwacheon-dong by Australian missionaries under the name Ilsin Girls' School (일신여학교), it was the beginning of modern women's education in Busan.

== History ==
Dongnae Girls' High School was founded on October 15, 1895 under the name Ilshin Girls' School. In June 1925, the school moved to Boksan-dong and changed its name to Dongnae Ilshin Girls' School (동래일신여학교). The school was then split into a separate middle school and high school in September 1951, and Dongnae Girls' High School was established as a private school on July 14, 2009. The current principal Moon Seong-gyu was appointed on September 1, 2015 as the school's 23rd principal.

== Notable alumni ==
- Park Cha-jeong - Independence activist
- Gong Deok-gwi - First Lady of South Korea (1960—1962)
