= Oncheon =

Oncheon or Onchŏn may refer to:

- Onchon County, Nampo City, South Pyongan Province, North Korea
- Oncheon-dong, neighbourhood (dong) of Dongnae District, Busan, South Korea
- Oncheon-cheon, stream in Busan, South Korea
- the Korean word for "hot spring", similar to Onsen in Japanese
