= Seondugu-dong =

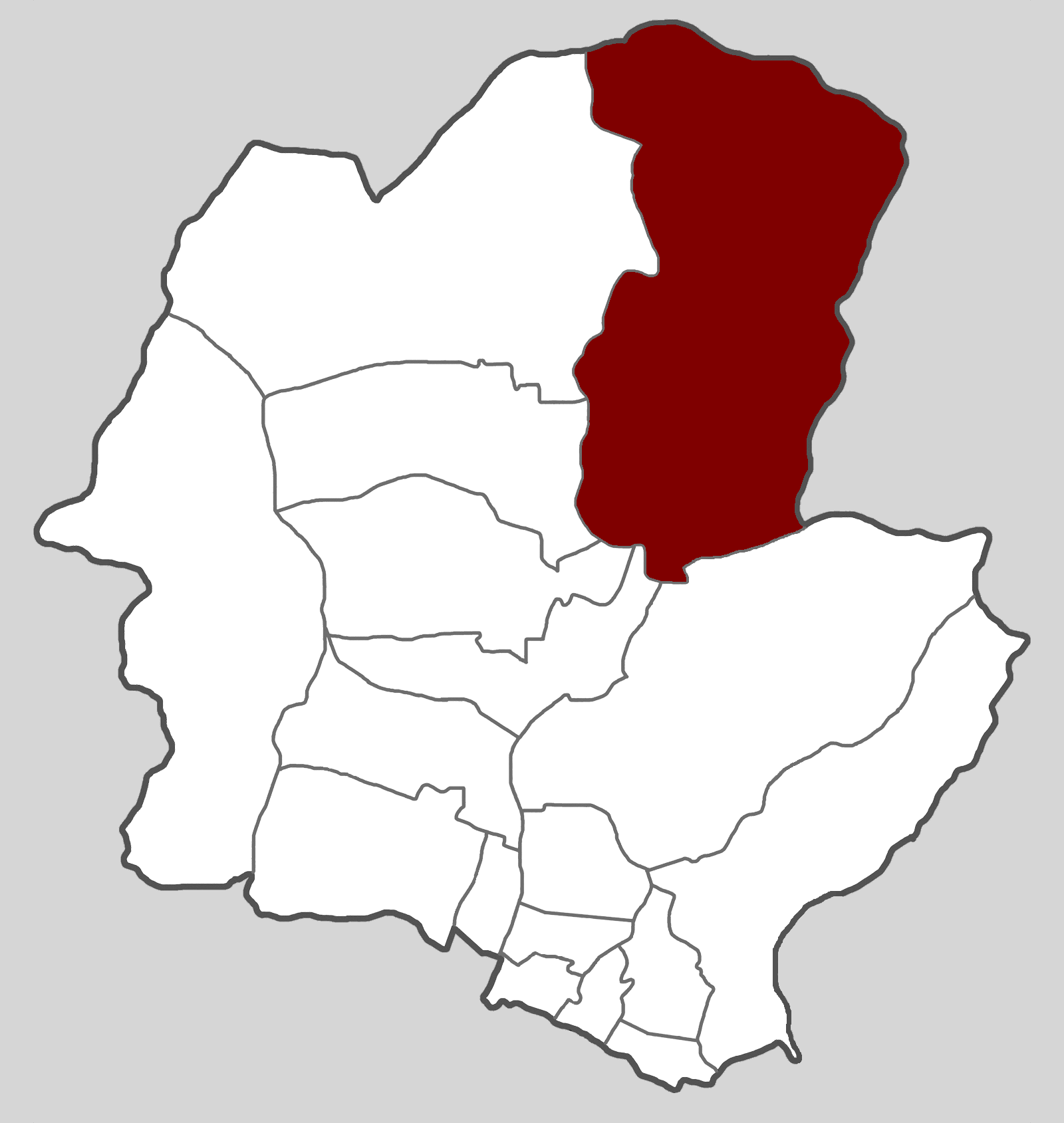
- Country: South Korea
- Administrative divisions: 1 administrative dong

Area
  - Total: 12.05 km^{2} (4.65 sq mi)

Population (2011)
  - Total: 2,857
  - Density: 237/km^{2} (610/sq mi)

Korean name
- Hangul: 선두구동
- Hanja: 仙杜邱洞
- RR: Seondugu-dong
- MR: Sŏndugu-dong

Seondugu-dong (Korean: 선두구동) is a dong, or precinct, in Geumjeong-gu, Busan, South Korea. It was created in 1998 when the former districts Seon-dong and Dugu-dong were amalgamated.

== See also ==
- Geography of South Korea
- Administrative divisions of South Korea
