= Beomeosa =

Buddhist temple in Busan, South Korea

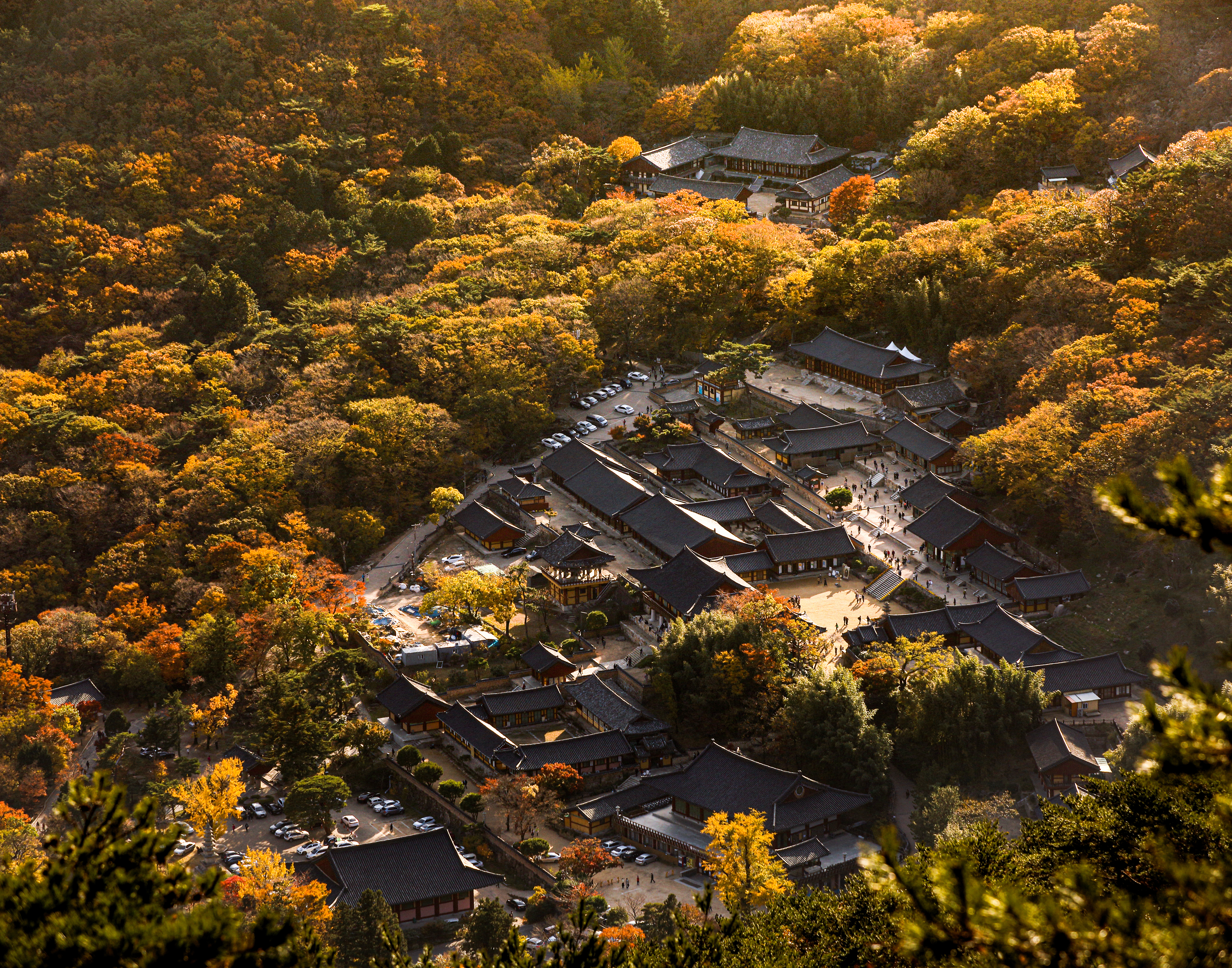
- The temple during the fall (2021)

- Location within Busan Location within South Korea

Religion
- Affiliation: Jogye Order of Korean Buddhism

Location
- Location: 250 Beomeosa-ro (Cheongryong-dong), Geumjeong District, Busan, South Korea
- Country: South Korea
- Coordinates: 35°17′2″N 129°4′5″E

Architecture
- Established: 678

Website
- beomeo.kr/eng/sub1.php (in English)

Korean name
- Hangul: 범어사
- Hanja: 梵魚寺
- RR: Beomeosa
- MR: Pŏmŏsa

Beomeosa (Korean: 범어사; lit. 'Temple of the Nirvana Fish') is one of the head temples of the Jogye Order of Korean Buddhism in Cheongnyeongnopo-dong, Geumjeong District, Busan, South Korea. Built on the slopes of the mountain Geumjeongsan, it is one of the country's best known temples.

== Name ==
Geumjeongsan, the mountain where Beomeosa is found, has a pool of water in a boulder near its peak. The pool is called Geumsaem (금샘; 金井; lit. 'golden fountain'), and it is believed to have mystical properties because a golden fish from heaven now lives in the lake. (Note: The legend is recorded in the text Revised Academic Geography for the Eastern Country (신증동국여지승남; 新增東國輿地勝覽; Sinjeung dongguk yeoji seungnam))

The temple gets its name from this legend: beom (범; 梵) means "Nirvāṇa", eo (어; 魚) means "fish", and sa (사; 寺) means "temple". Thus, the temple's name can be translated as "Temple of the Nirvana Fish". The official website for the temple translates its name as "Temple of Gold Fish from Brahma Heaven".

== Description ==
Beomeosa Temple is considered one of the three major temples in southeast Korea, along with Haeinsa Temple and Tongdosa Temple. Its strong Seon Buddhist spirit has earned it the title "Great Headquarters Temple of Seon Buddhism".

There are three spots at the temple considered particularly scenic: the rock peak behind Wonhyoam Hermitage; two rocks in the shape of a chicken at Gyemyeongam Hermitage; and the legendary "golden well" on top of Mt. Geumjeongsan.

The temple participates in the Templestay program, where tourists can stay at the temple, eat Buddhist monk food, and experience the routine of the monks there.

== Treasures ==
Well before reaching the Beomeosa Temple compound, visitors first see Jogyemun (Treasure No. 1461), the One Pillar Gate. All of its four pillars have short wooden columns sitting on high stone bases.

Around the temple is a mass of wild wisteria, consisting of over 6,500 plants (Natural Monument No. 176). The wisteria bloom a vibrant lavender color in late spring. This area has thus historically been called "Deungungok" (등운곡; 藤雲谷; lit. 'Wisteria Blossom Valley').

The temple complex has several buildings and other objects which are designated as official treasures:

- Treasure 250 - Three Story Stone Pagoda. This pagoda dates back to the Unified Shilla era probably erected as part of the original temple that was destroyed by fire in 1592. Only the top three-stories are from the Shilla where the base and fence are later additions.
- Treasure 434 - Daeungjeon, the main temple hall, was built in 1614 after the temple was burned down during the Japanese invasion of 1592. Major renovations of Daeungjeon were undertaken in 1713, 1814 and 1871.
- Tangible Cultural Asset 2 - Iljumun. The first gate to the temple, called the "One Pillar Gate" because when viewed from the side the gate appears to be supported by a single pillar, symbolizing the one true path of enlightenment, supporting the world.
- Tangible Cultural Assets 11 and 12 - Wonhyoam Eastern Pagoda and Wonhyoam Western Pagoda. Wonhyoam (hermitage) is located to the south of Beomeosa and is the site of these two pagodas. This the site of the former residence of the famous Shilla monk, Wonhyo.
- Tangible Cultural Asset 15 - Flag Pole Holder. These two very old stone structures, called a jiju, were used to support a flagpole between them. The stones are found on the path up to Beomeosa's main gate.
- Tangible Cultural Asset 16 - Stone Lamp. This lamp dates back to the Unified Shilla era and was part of the original temple that was destroyed by fire in 1592.
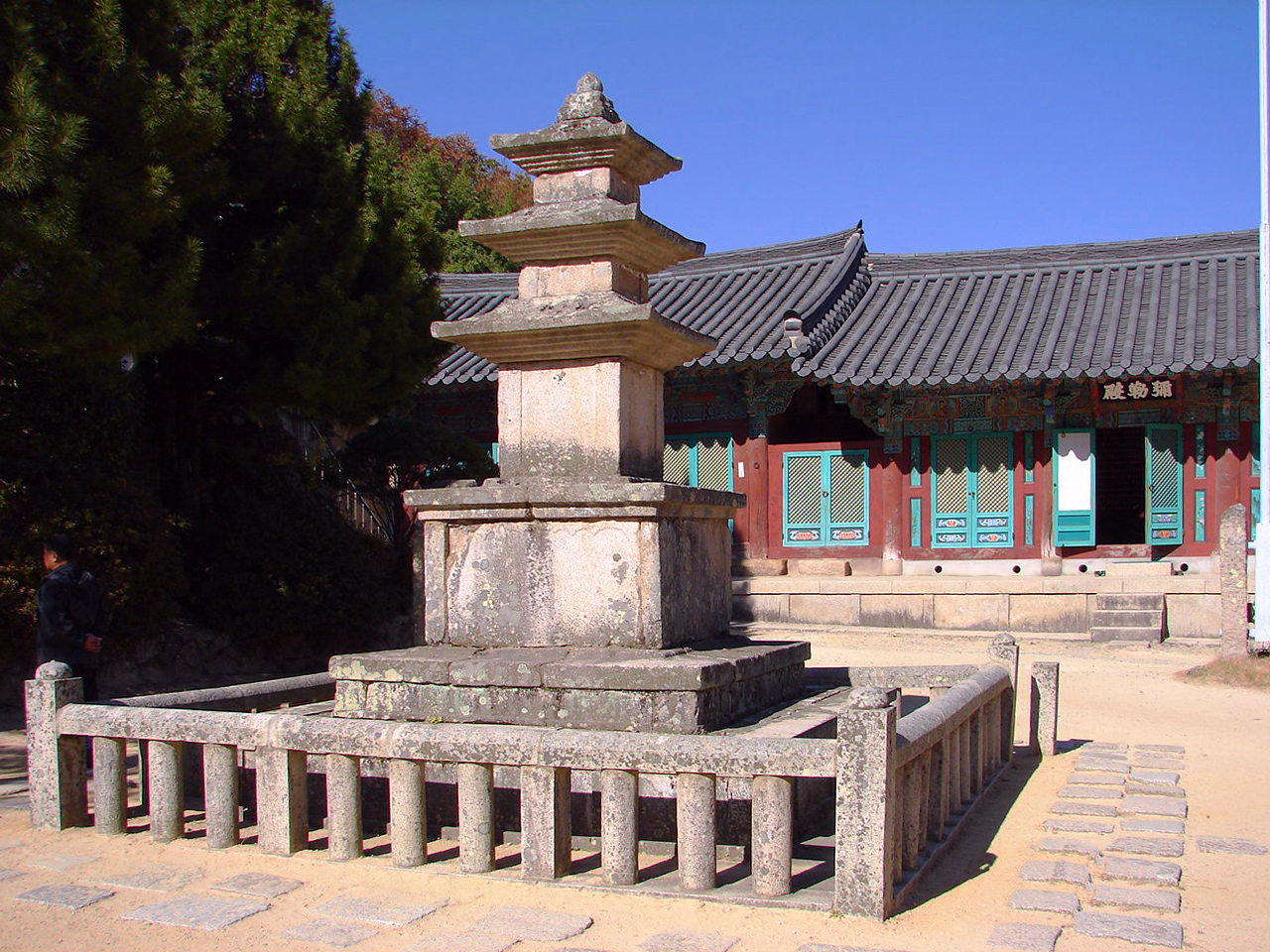
Treasure 250 - Beomeosa Three Story Stone Pagoda built some time between 826-836, during the Silla era.

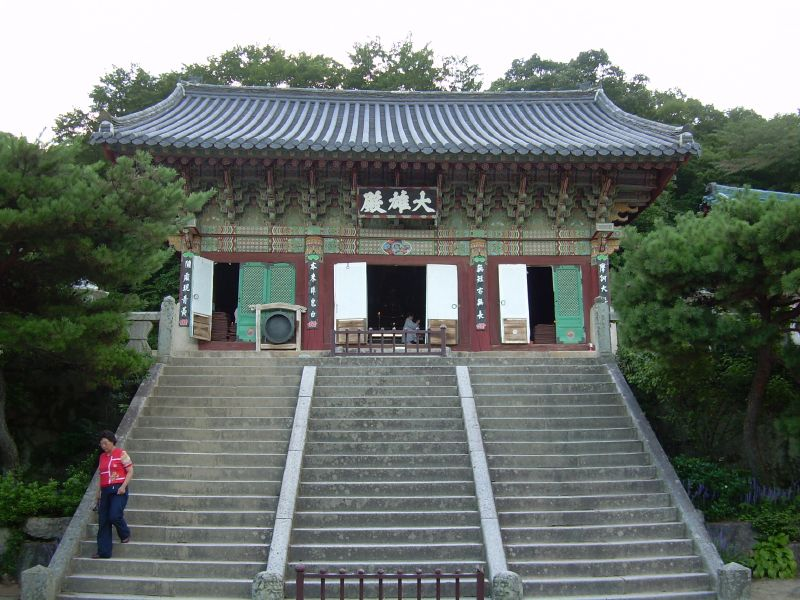
Treasure 434 - Beomeosa Daeungjeon, the main temple hall, built in 1614 after the temple was burned down during the Japanese invasions. Major remodellings of this building were undertaken in 1713, 1814 and 1871.

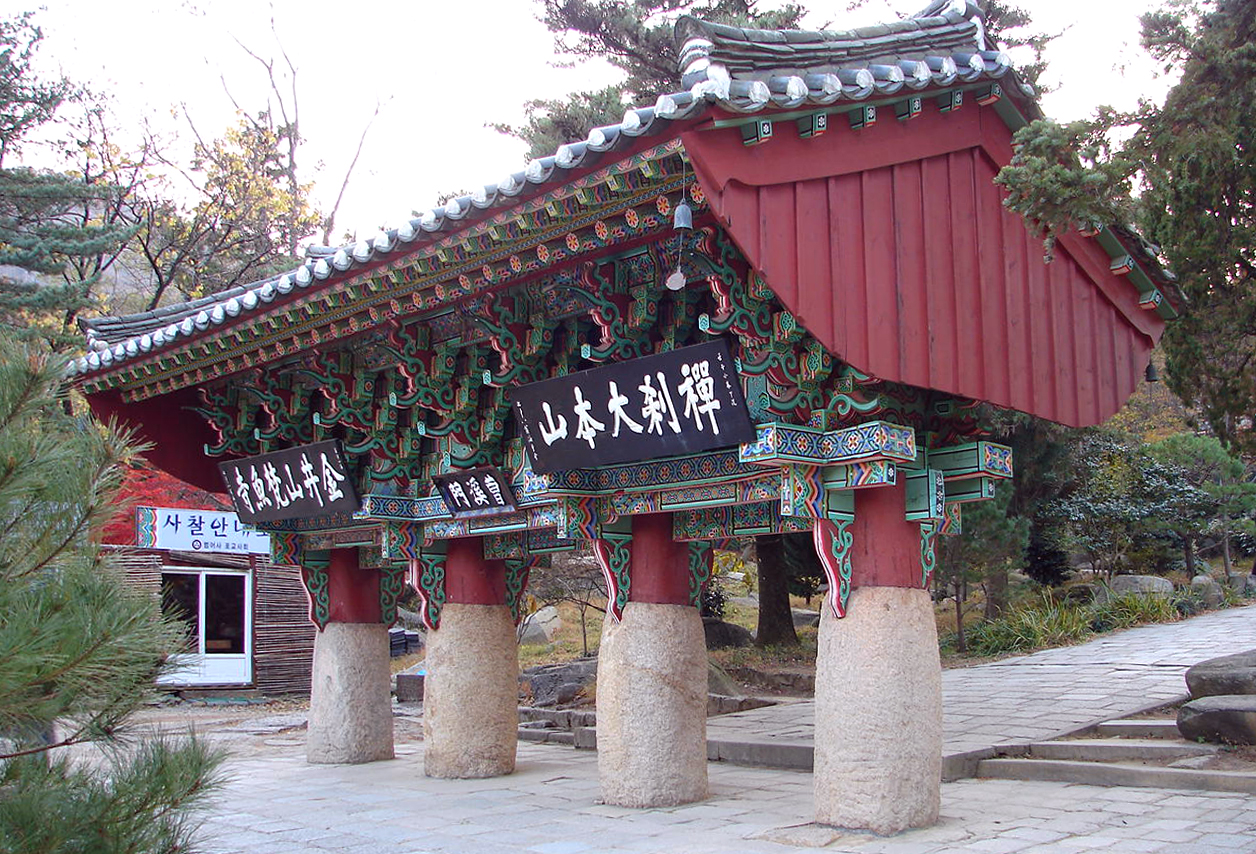
Tangible Cultural Asset 2 - Beomeosa Iljumun. The first gate to the temple, called the "One-Pillar Gate", because when viewed from the side the gate appears to be supported by a single pillar symbolizing the one true path of enlightenment which supports the world, built originally in 1614.

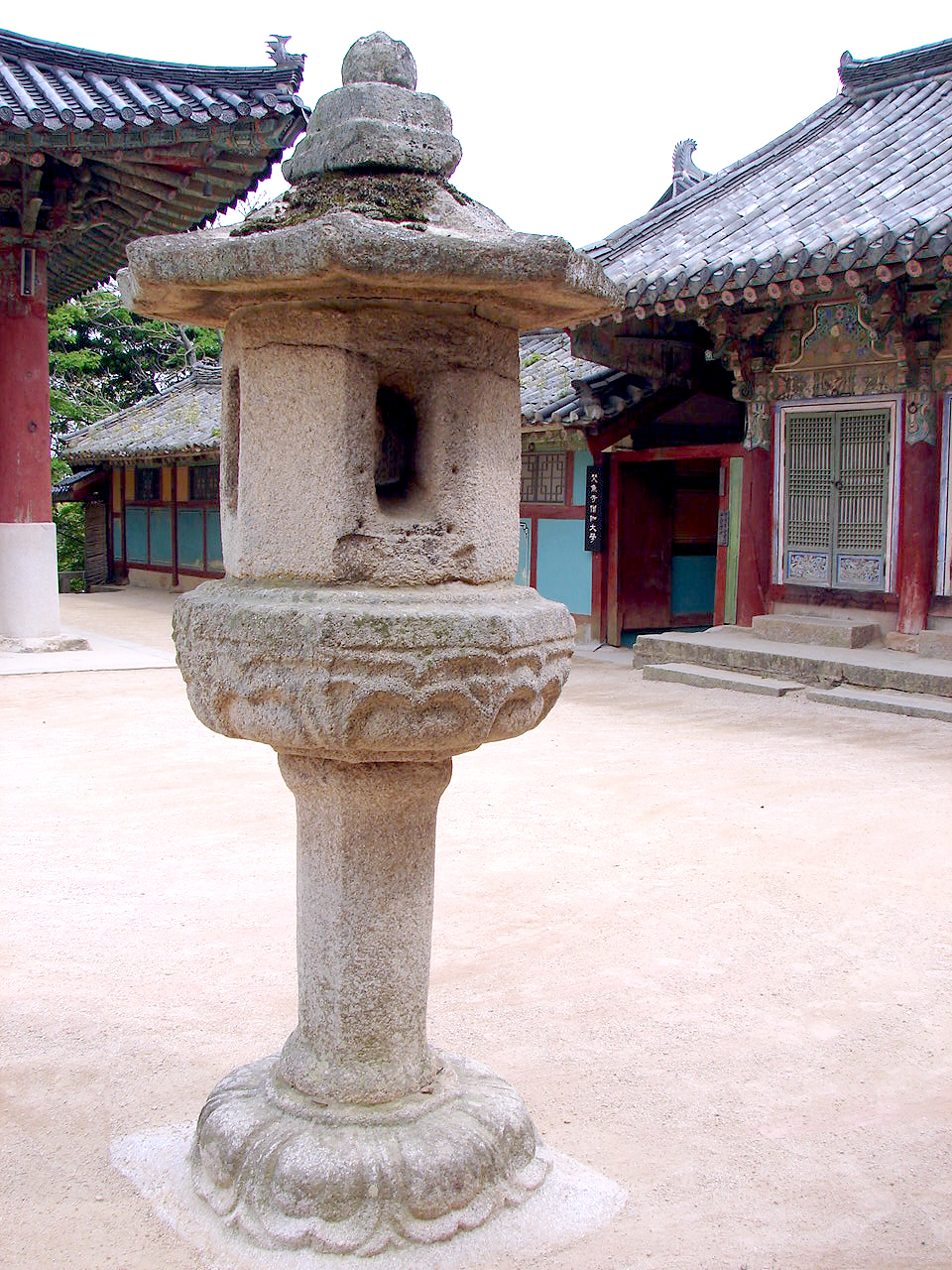
Tangible Cultural Asset 16 - Beomeosa Stone Lamp dates back to the Silla era and was part of the original temple that was destroyed by fire in 1592.

== Hermitages ==
- Chungryungam (Blue Lotus Hermitage)
- Naewonam (Buddha's Celestial Teaching Hall Hermitage)
- Kyemyongam (Rooster's Crow Hermitage)
- Daesongam (Great Saint Hermitage)
- Geumgangam (Diamond Hermitage)
- Anyangam (Peace Nurturing Hermitage)
- Mirukam (Maitreya Hermitage)
- Wonhyoam (Former hermitage residence of the famous monk, Wonhyo)
- Sajaam (Lion Hermitage)
- Mansongam (Great Teacher Hermitage)
- Chijangam (Ksitigarbha Hermitage)

== History ==
Beomeosa was established in 678 during the Silla period, as one of the ten major temples of the Avatamsaka School.

As it was established by decree of King Munmu, Beomeosa Temple began on 360 gyeol of land and had 360 dormitory rooms. However, it was almost reduced to ashes during the Japanese invasion (1592–1597). Later, in 1613, monks like Ven. Myojeon and Ven. Haemin renovated some of its Dharma halls and the dormitory. The Main Buddha Hall and One Pillar Gate are known to have been built at that time.

Seon Master Gyeongheo, an eminent monk of modern times, opened a Seon center at Beomeosa in 1900. Inspired by Ven. Gyeongheo, Seongwol, then abbot of Beomeosa, taught the Seon tradition by establishing Seon centers and Seon assemblies in Beomeosa's six hermitages in the span of 10 years as follows: Geumgangam in 1899; Anyangam in 1900; Gyemyeongam in 1902; Wonhyoam in 1906; Ansimnyo in 1909; and Daeseongam in 1910.

Eminent monks who have lived at the temple include Great Masters Uisang, Pyohun, Nangbaek, Myeonghak, Gyeongheo, Yongseong, Manhae and Dongsan. Even today, Beomeosa Temple teaches serious Buddhist practice. In 2012, the temple was designated a Geumjeong Chongnim, one of eight comprehensive monastic training complexes for the Jogye Order of Korean Buddhism, and its first spiritual patriarch is Master Jiyu.

On December 26, 2011, the Los Angeles Times printed a story of the fighting monks at this temple. South Korean Buddhist monk Ando demonstrates Sunmudo martial arts techniques. Monks from Beomeosa Temple are famed for defeating Japanese invaders during the late 16th century and again during the Japanese occupation of Korea in the early 20th century.

== Gallery ==
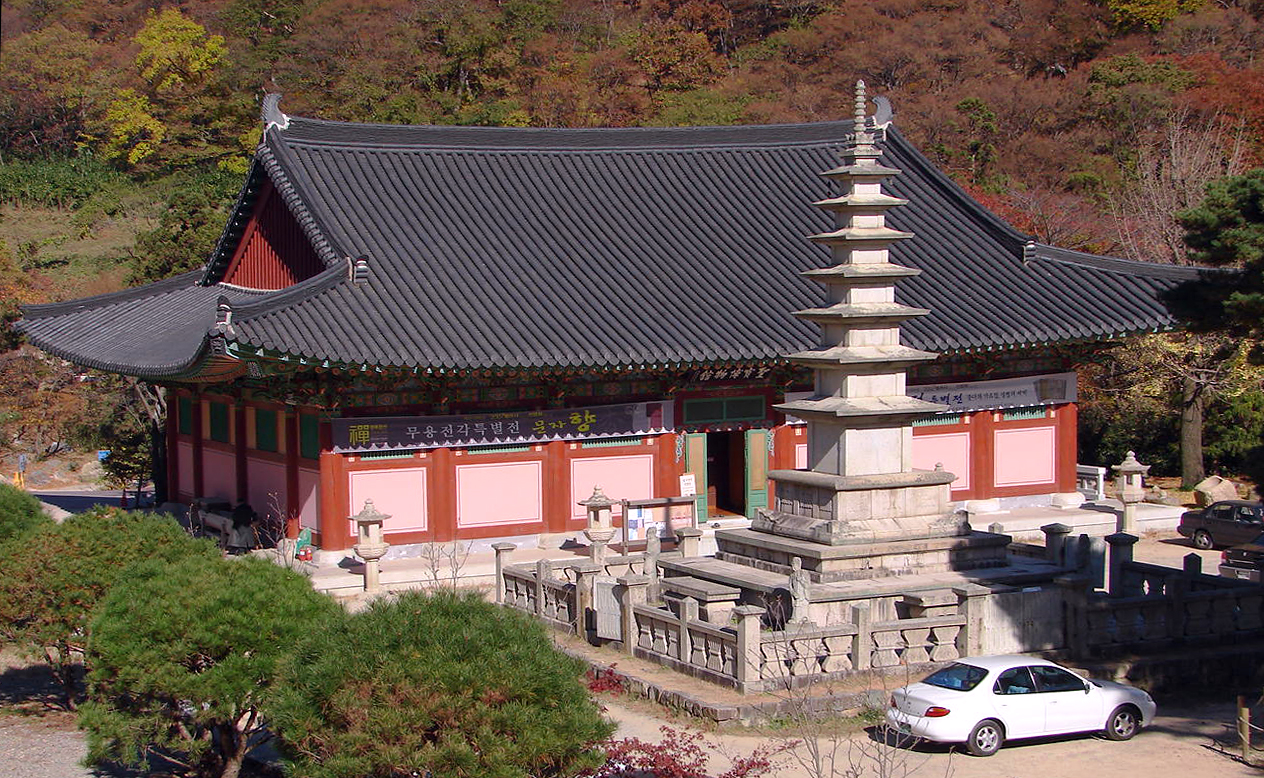
Beomeosa Seven Story Stone Pagoda is relatively recent addition and contains a Sari of the Buddha. The four corners of the base of the pagoda are guarded by stone sculptures of the Four Heavenly Kings. Beomeosa's museum sets behind the pagoda.

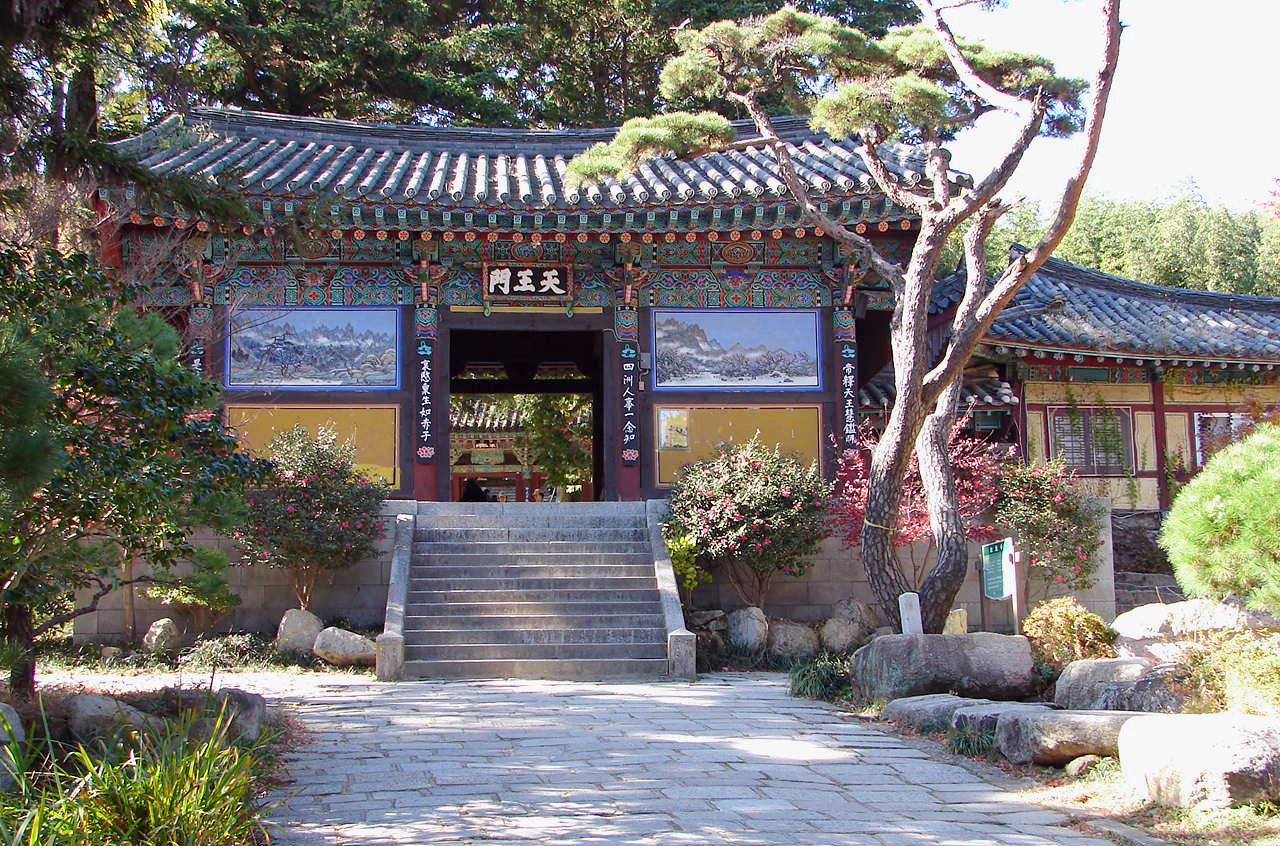
Beomeosa's second gate, Beomeosa Cheonwangmun, or Gate of the Four Heavenly Kings was originally built in 1699 and houses the four kings or divas guarding the entrance to the temple.

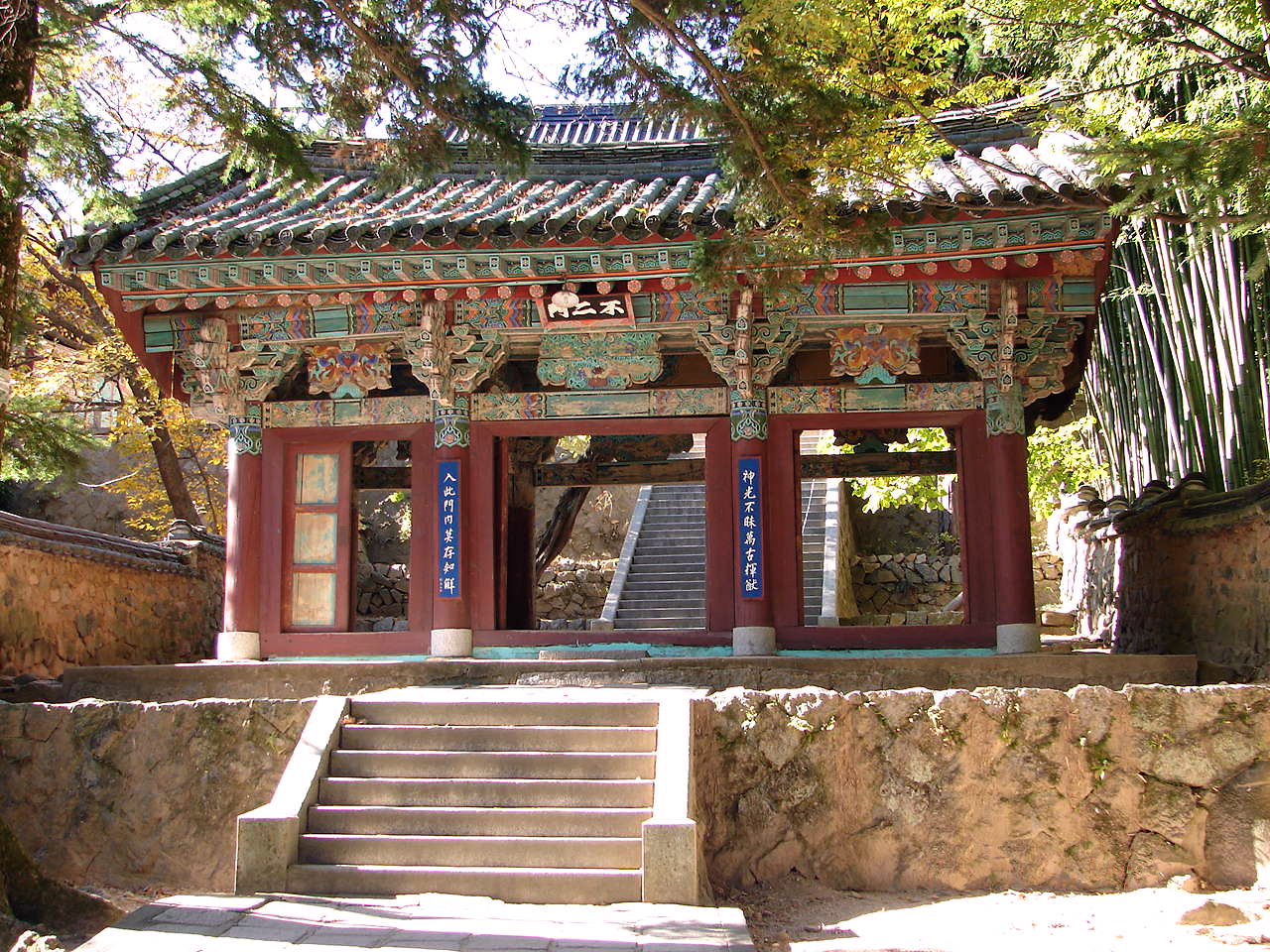
Beomeosa's third gate, Beomeosa Burimun, or Gate of Non-Duality was originally built in 1699. This is the final gate before entering the main temple compound symbolizing the concept that the realm of the Buddha and this world are the same.

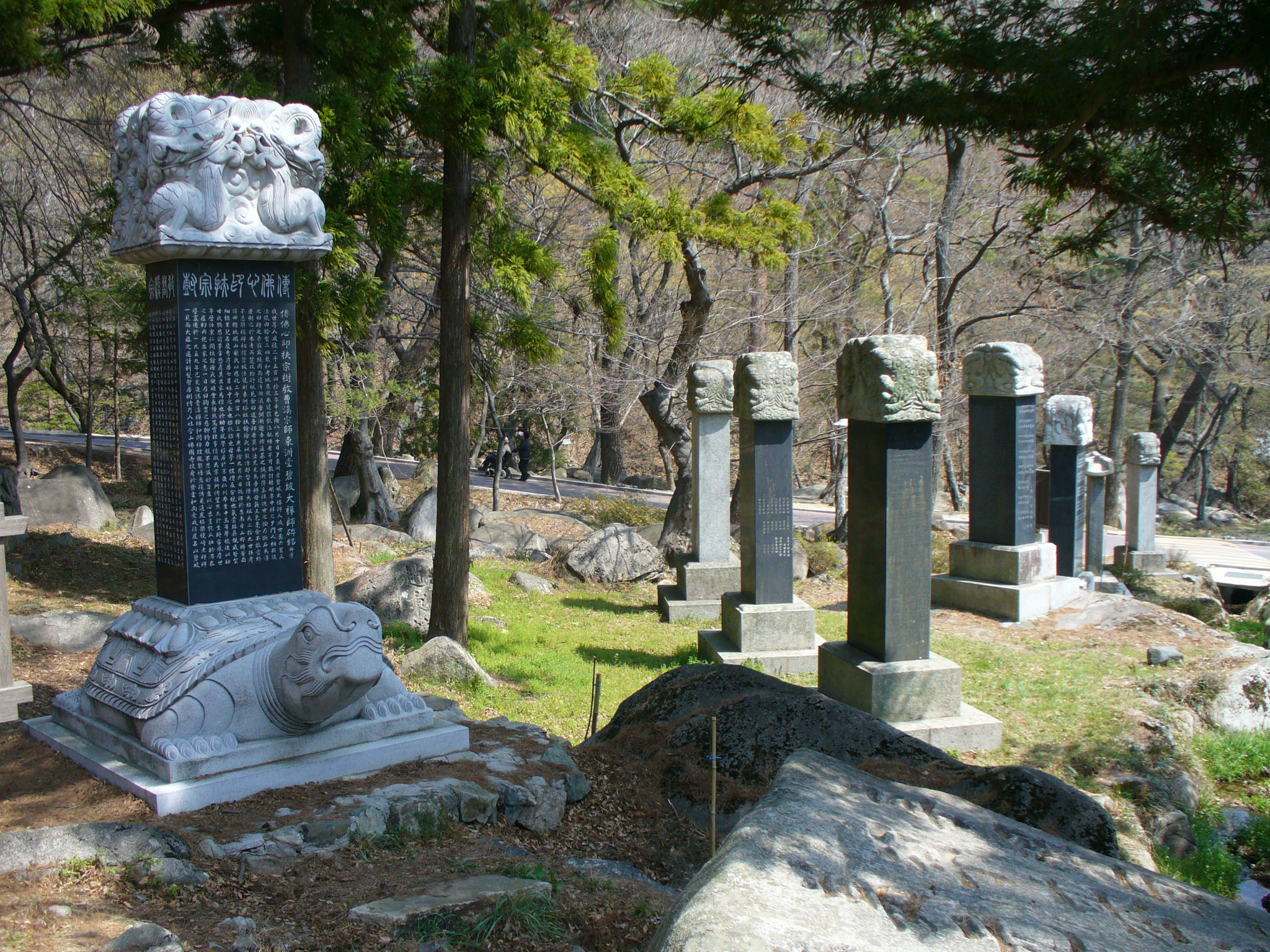
Steles along the pathway leading to the entrance to Beomeosa.

== See also ==
- Jogye Order
- Korean Buddhism
- Korean Buddhist temples
- Temple Stay
- Three Jewel Temples of Korea
