= Seo-dong =

Coordinates: 37°09′N 127°02′E

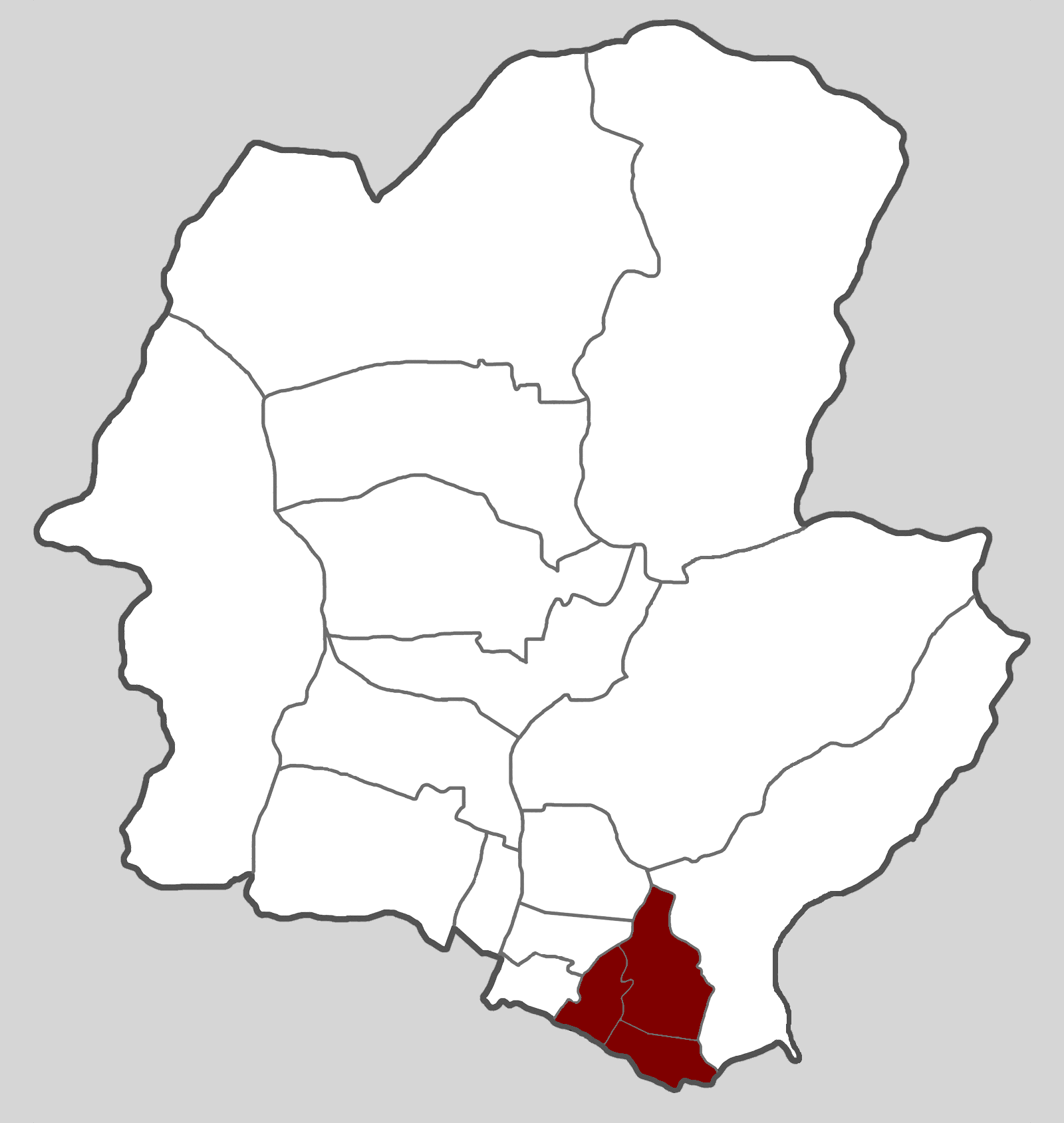
- Country: South Korea
- Administrative divisions: 3 administrative dong

Area
  - Total: 1.68 km^{2} (0.65 sq mi)

Population (2011)
  - Total: 38,053
  - Density: 22,651/km^{2} (58,670/sq mi)

Korean name
- Hangul: 서동
- Hanja: 書洞
- RR: Seo-dong
- MR: Sŏ-dong

Seo-dong (Korean: 서동) is a dong, or precinct, in Geumjeong-gu, Busan, South Korea.

== See also ==
- Geography of South Korea
- Administrative divisions of South Korea
