= Bugok-dong, Busan =

Bugok-dong
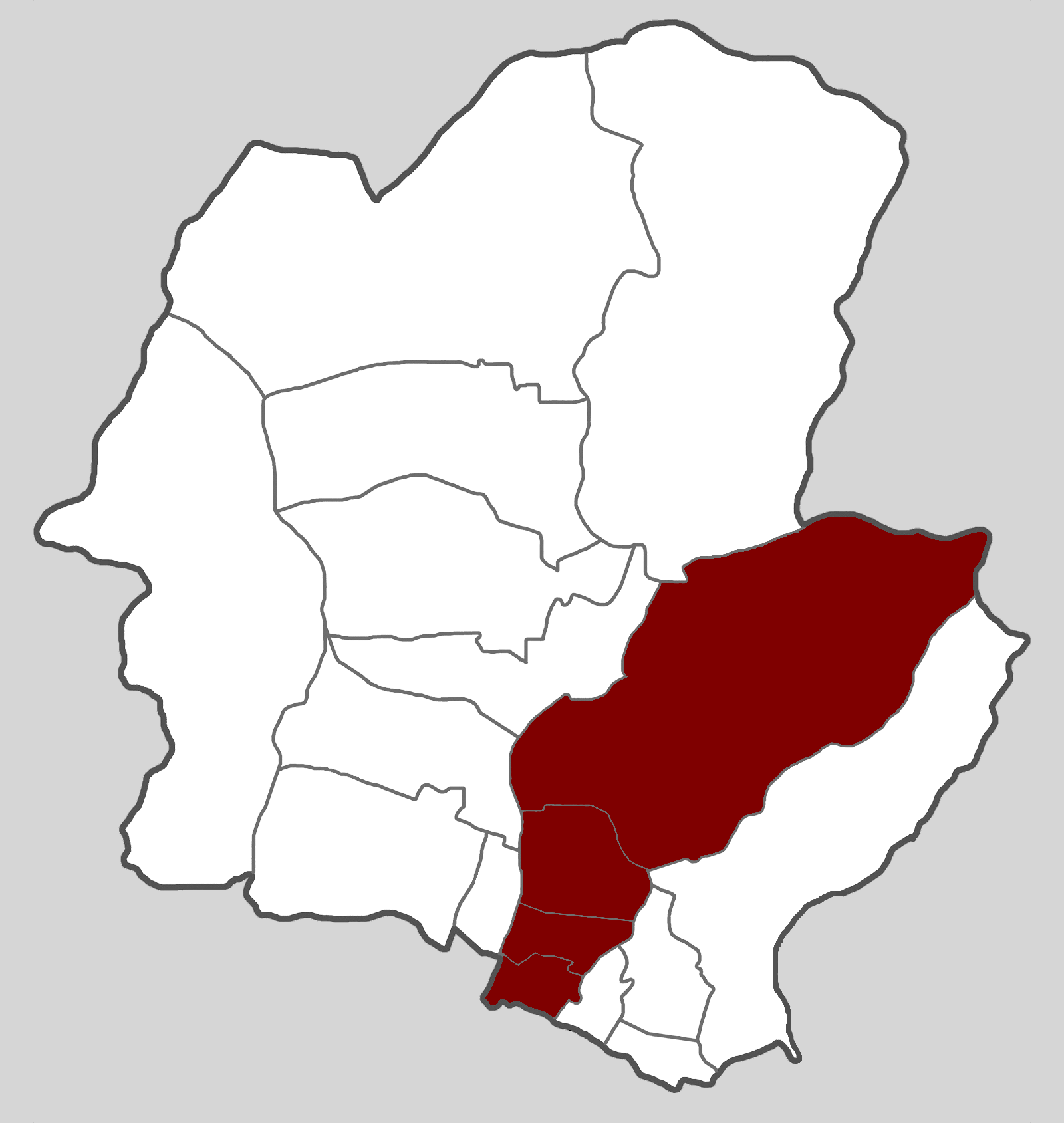
- Country: South Korea
- Administrative divisions: 4 administrative dong

Area
  - Total: 10.74 km^{2} (4.15 sq mi)

Population (2011)
  - Total: 65,268
  - Density: 6,077/km^{2} (15,740/sq mi)

Korean name
- Hangul: 부곡동
- Hanja: 釜谷洞
- RR: Bugok-dong
- MR: Pugok-tong

Bugok-dong (Korean: 부곡동) is a dong (neighborhood) in Geumjeong District, Busan, South Korea.

== See also ==
- Geography of South Korea
- Administrative divisions of South Korea
