= Namsan-dong, Busan =

Namsan-dong
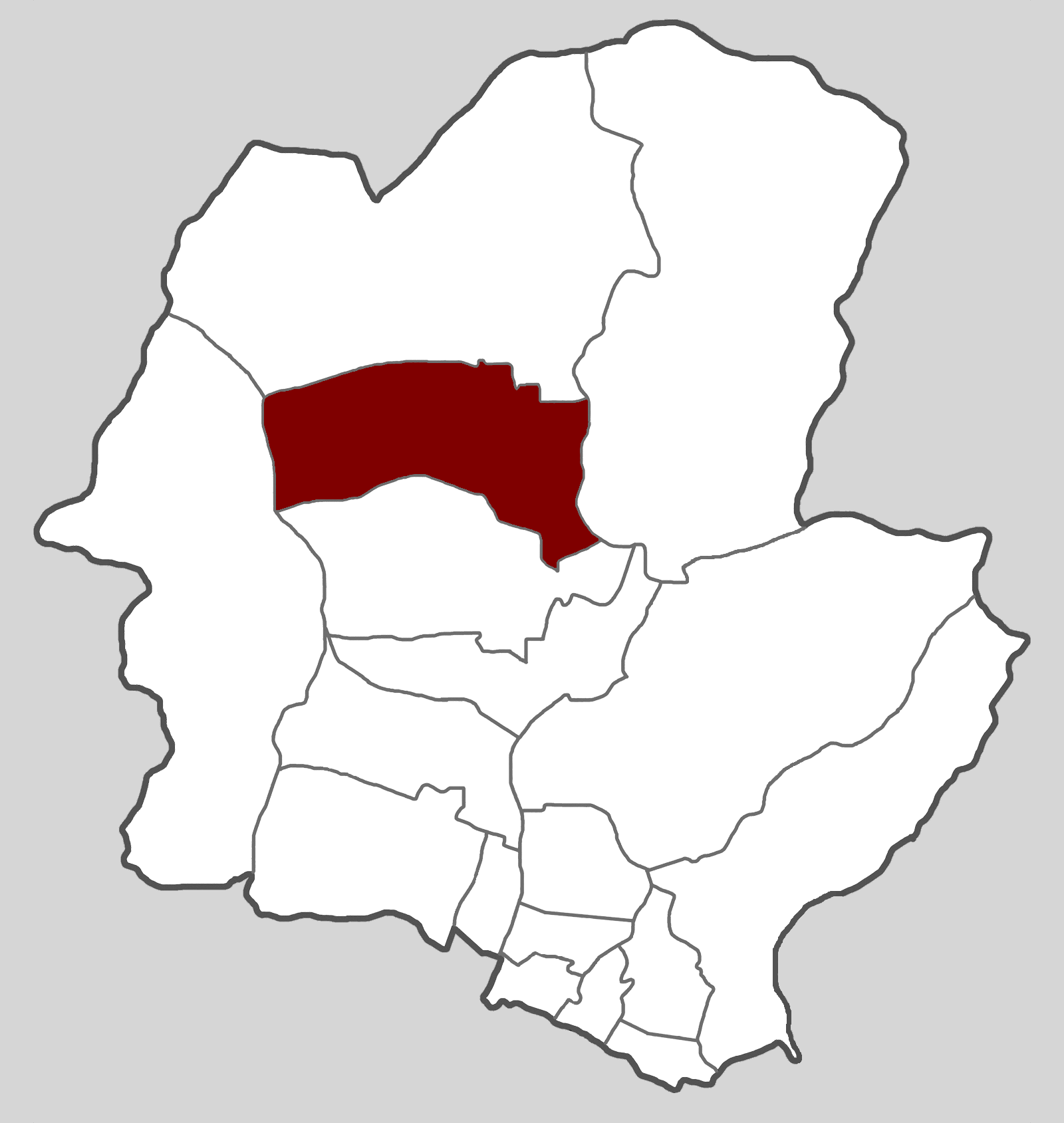
- Country: South Korea
- Administrative divisions: 1 administrative dong

Area
  - Total: 3.64 km^{2} (1.41 sq mi)

Population (2011)
  - Total: 35,255
  - Density: 9,685/km^{2} (25,080/sq mi)

Korean name
- Hangul: 남산동
- Hanja: 南山洞
- RR: Namsan-dong
- MR: Namsan-dong

Namsan-dong (Korean: 남산동) is a dong, or precinct, in Geumjeong-gu, Busan, South Korea.

== See also ==
- Geography of South Korea
- Administrative divisions of South Korea
