= Oncheoncheon =

Stream in Busan, South Korea

Coordinates: 35°11′20″N 129°06′53″E

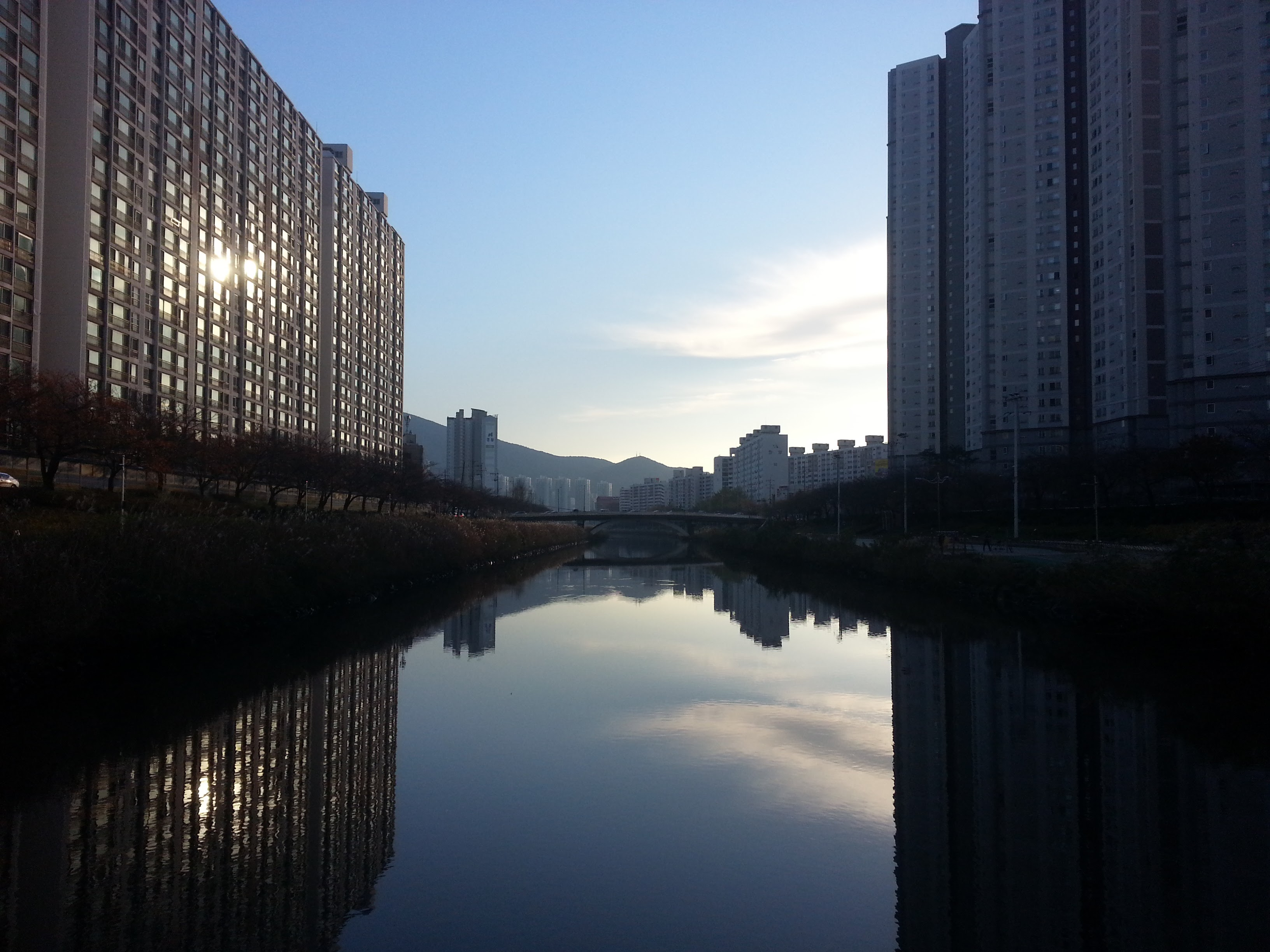
- A view of Oncheoncheon

Korean name
- Hangul: 온천천
- Hanja: 溫泉川
- RR: Oncheoncheon
- MR: Onch'ŏnch'ŏn

Oncheoncheon (Korean: 온천천), also Oncheon Stream or Oncheon River, is a tributary of the Suyeong River in Busan, South Korea. It was previously known as the Seocheon or Dongnaecheon. The source of the river is on Geumjeongsan. It then flows through the built-up area of Busan, passing between Allak-dong (Dongnae District) and Yeonsan-dong (Yeonje District) along the way.

In 2003, the Busan municipal government began redevelopment in order to address the stream's environmental issues and provide recreation facilities on its banks. The Oncheon Stream Park along the banks of the river is an excellent place to view the blossoming of cherry trees.

== Ecosystem ==
The river's ecosystem suffered due to urban development and industrialisation. A 1984 study found that the water contained more than ten times the safe level of synthetic organic compounds, attributable to the dumping of industrial waste in the river. In April 2000, eight social & environmental volunteer groups began efforts to restore the river's ecosystem. However, by 2008, there was still far greater plant diversity at the upper reaches of the river than in the urban area.

== See also ==
- Cheonggyecheon, a river in Seoul with a similar redevelopment history
