= Geumjeongsanseong =

Mountain fortress in Busan, South Korea

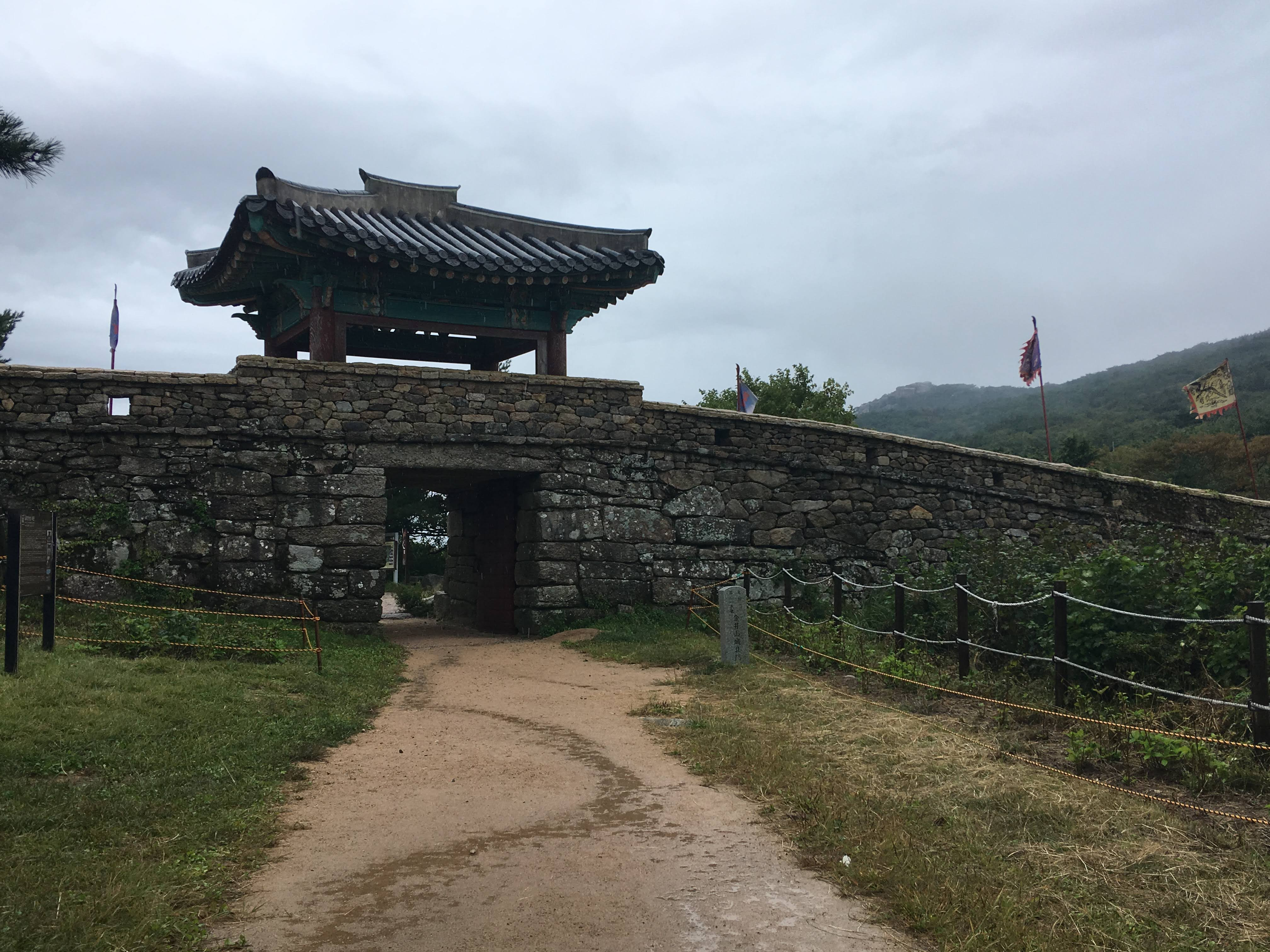
- Interactive map of Geumjeongsanseong
- Type: Korean fortress
- Location: Geumjeong District, Busan, South Korea
- Coordinates: 35°16′59″N 129°3′20″E
- Built: 1703; rebuilt in 1707, 1807, 1972, 1974 and 1989
- Built by: Jo Tae-dong, the Governor of Gyeongsang-do (1703), Oh Han-won, the Dongnae Magistrate (1807), Government of the Busan Metropolitan City (1972, 1974 and 1989)

Historic Sites of South Korea
- Official name: Geumjeongsanseong Fortress
- Designated: 1971-02-09
- Reference no.: 215

Korean name
- Hangul: 금정산성
- Hanja: 金井山城
- RR: Geumjeongsanseong
- MR: Kŭmjŏngsansŏng

Geumjeongsanseong (Korean: 금정산성; Hanja: 金井山城; lit. Geumjeong Mountain Fortress) is a Joseon-era Korean fortress on the mountain Geumjeongsan in Busan, South Korea. It is the largest fortress in Korea.

== History ==
It's not known with certainty when the first fortress on this location was built; structures existed here from at latest the mid-Joseon period and were continually renovated over time. A fortress may have existed in the area from even during the 57 BCE – 935 CE Silla period. There is a record of repairs being suggested for it in 1667.

Following the 1592–1598 Japanese invasions of Korea and the Manchu invasions of Korea, much of the current castle was constructed from 1701 to 1703. In 1707, the fortress was judged to be too large, and so it was split into northern and southern sections by a wall. This fortress fell to disuse because it was too large to maintain. New gates and towers were constructed in 1806. There is a stele (금정산성 부설비; 金井山城 復設碑) recording the building of the gates.

The fortress was partly destroyed during the Japanese occupation (1910-1945).

=== Modern period and restoration work ===
The fortress was made Historic Site of South Korea No. 215 on February 9, 1971, and the fortress upkeep is now done by the Busan Metropolitan Government. The east, west, and south gates began to be restored in 1972. The north gate was rebuilt in 1989. Of the 4 existing observation towers, the tower number 1 (제1망루) located on the south-west side was destroyed by the typhoon Rusa on the morning of September 1, 2002.

More restoration works were under way in the 2000s. Work was divided in 3 phases of 5 years between 1996 and 2010.

- Phase 1 (1996–2000) covers the west region, going from the North Gate down to the West Gate.
- Phase 2 (2000–2005) covers the section of wall on the east side, running between the North Gate and the East Gate. It include the observation towers 3 and 4.
- Phase 3 (2006–2010) covers everything south of the West and East Gates, including the South Gate and the observation towers 1 and 2.

== Description ==
Much of the stones used in the walls are from the immediate environment of the mountain, and thus change depending on the location. The walls are either 16.383 km (10.180 mi) or 18.845 km (11.710 mi) in length and from 1.5 meters to 3 meters in height. The area surrounded by the fortress is about 8.2 square kilometers.

== Gallery ==
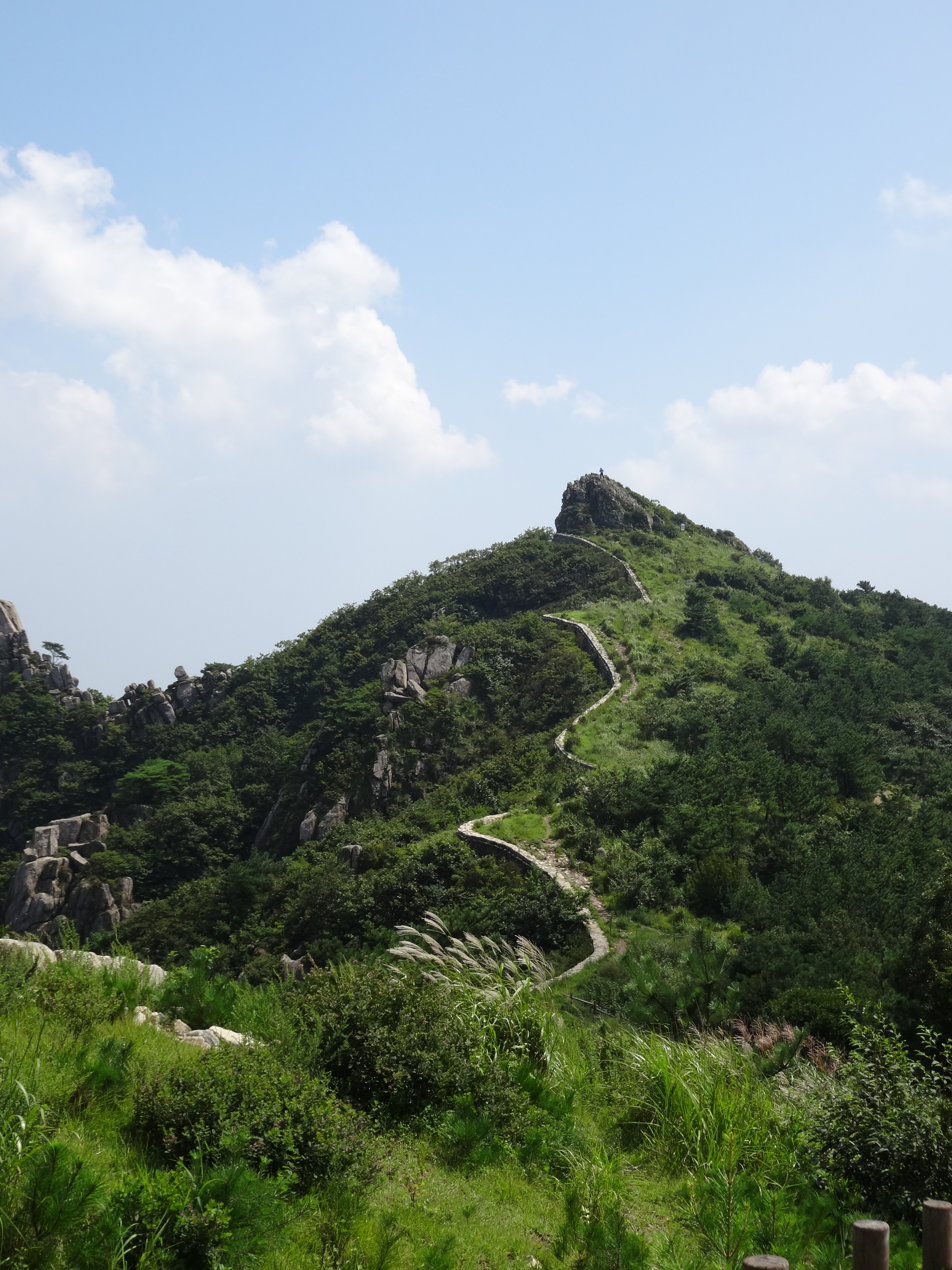
The castle walls, winding up the mountain (2004)

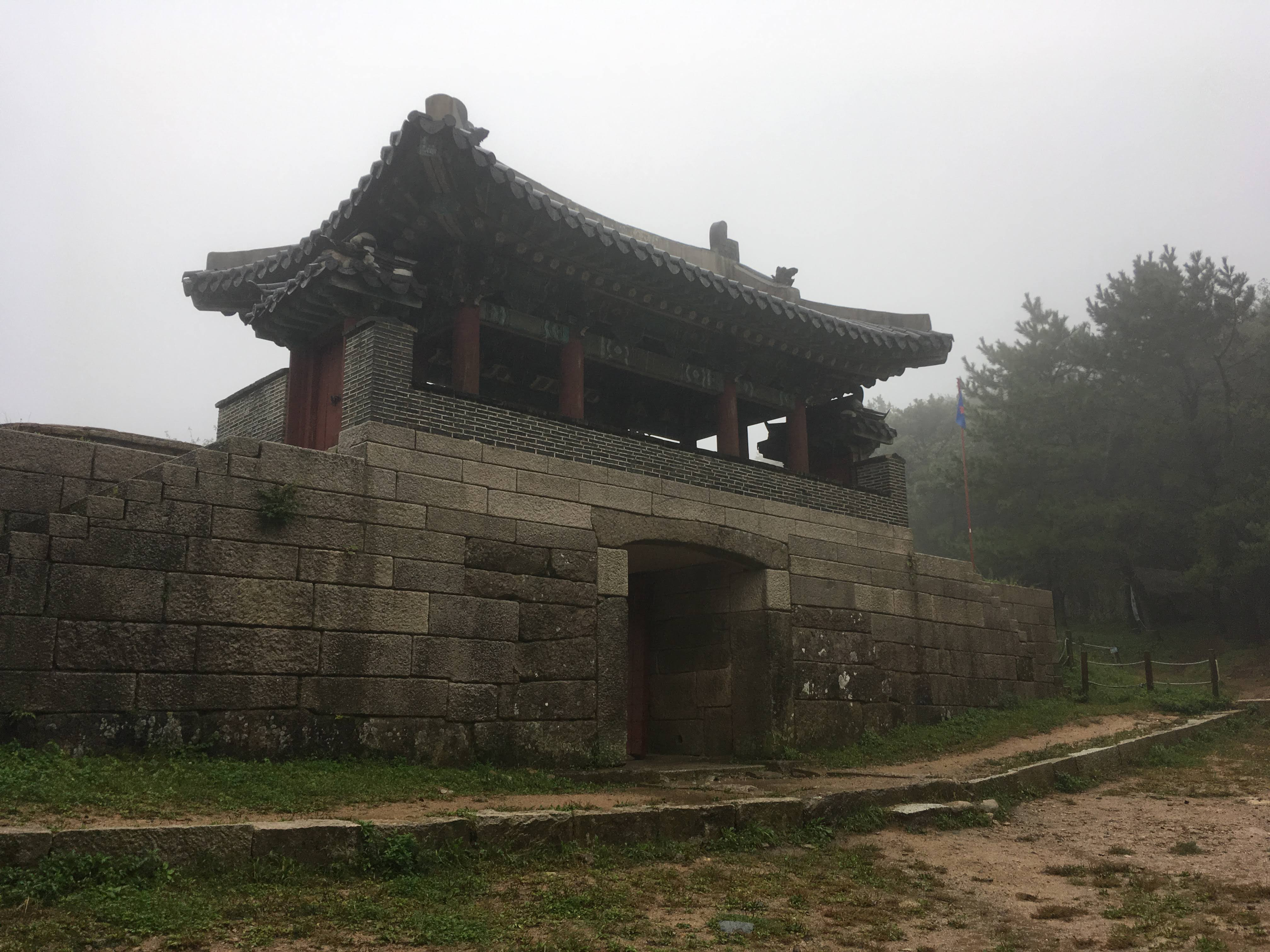
The south gate (2018)

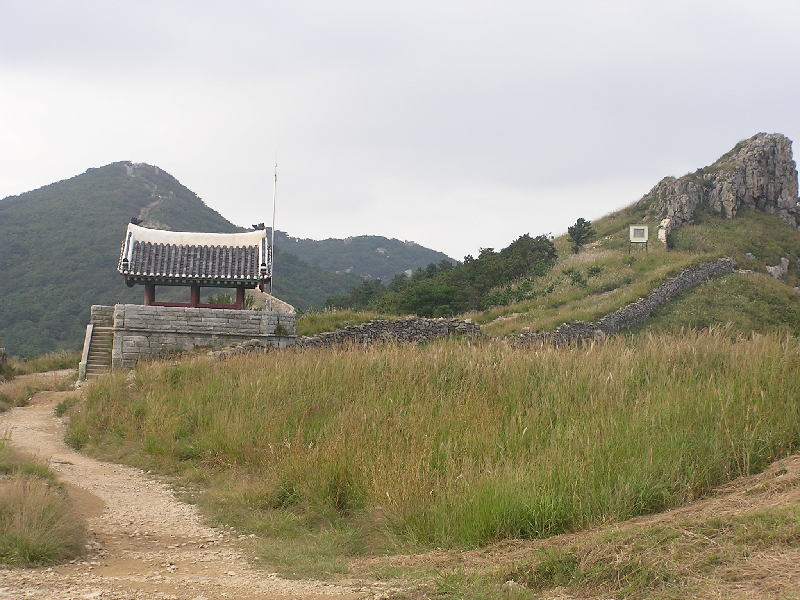
The east gate (2004)
