= Cheongnyeongnopo-dong =

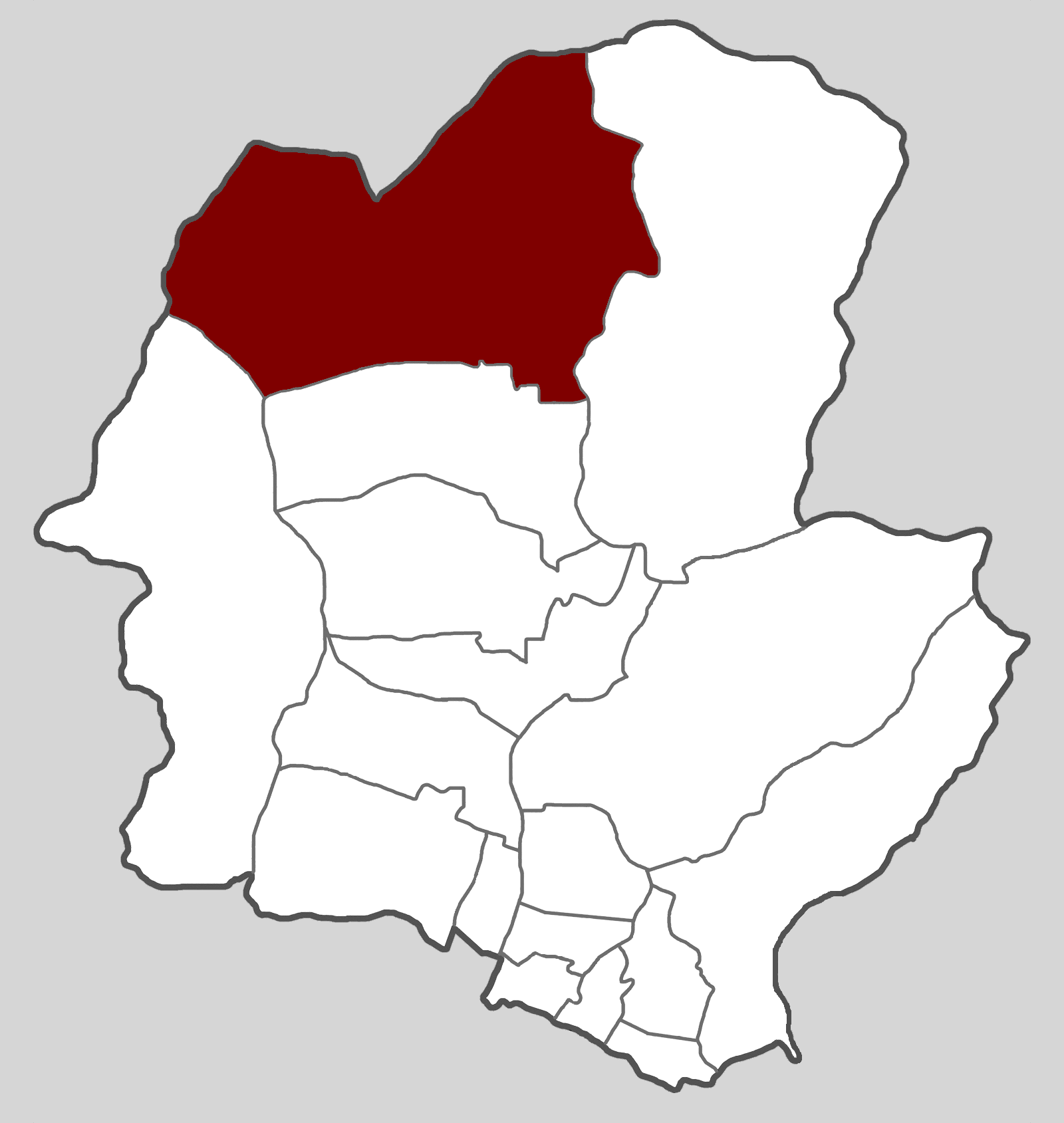
- Country: South Korea
- Administrative divisions: 1 administrative dong

Area
  - Total: 10.91 km^{2} (4.21 sq mi)

Population (2011)
  - Total: 10,192
  - Density: 934/km^{2} (2,420/sq mi)

Korean name
- Hangul: 청룡노포동
- Hanja: 靑龍老圃洞
- RR: Cheongnyongnopo-dong
- MR: Ch'ŏngnyongnop'o-dong

Cheongnyeongnopo-dong (Korean: 청룡노포동) is a dong (neighborhood), in Geumjeong District, Busan, South Korea. It was created in 1998 when the former districts Cheongnyeong-dong and Nopo-dong were amalgamated.

== See also ==
- Geography of South Korea
- Administrative divisions of South Korea
