= Guseo-dong =

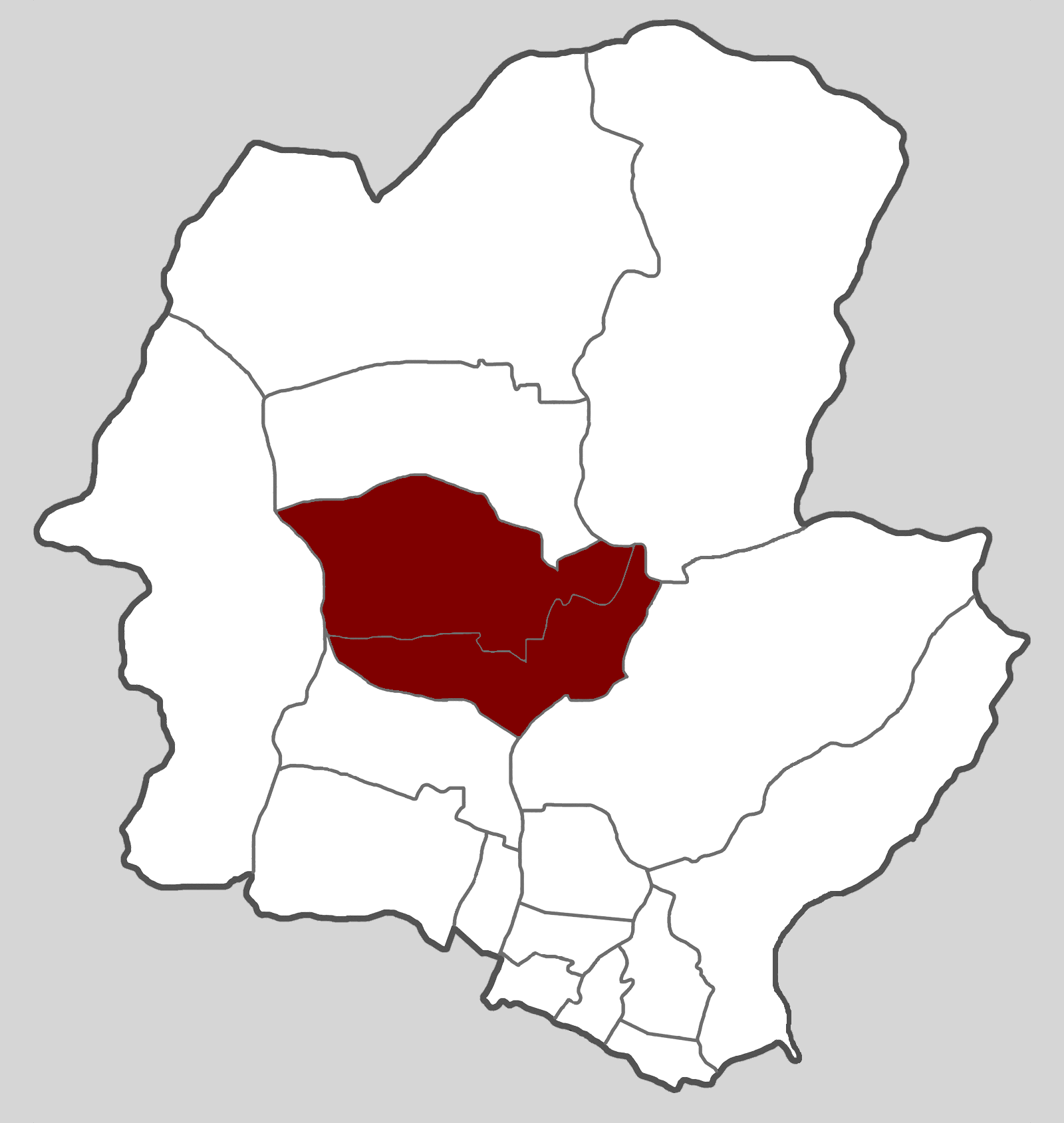
- Country: South Korea
- Administrative divisions: 2 administrative dong

Area
  - Total: 6.24 km^{2} (2.41 sq mi)

Population (2011)
  - Total: 57,571
  - Density: 9,226/km^{2} (23,900/sq mi)

Korean name
- Hangul: 구서동
- Hanja: 久瑞洞
- RR: Guseo-dong
- MR: Kusŏ-dong

Guseo-dong (Korean: 구서동) is a dong (neighborhood) of Geumjeong District, Busan, South Korea. Transportation includes the Guseo-dong station. The Grand Opera of Korea is located in the neighborhood.

== See also ==
- Geography of South Korea
- Administrative divisions of South Korea
