= Geumjeong District =

District of Busan, South Korea

Coordinates: 35°14′30″N 129°05′30″E

Geumjeong
- Autonomous District
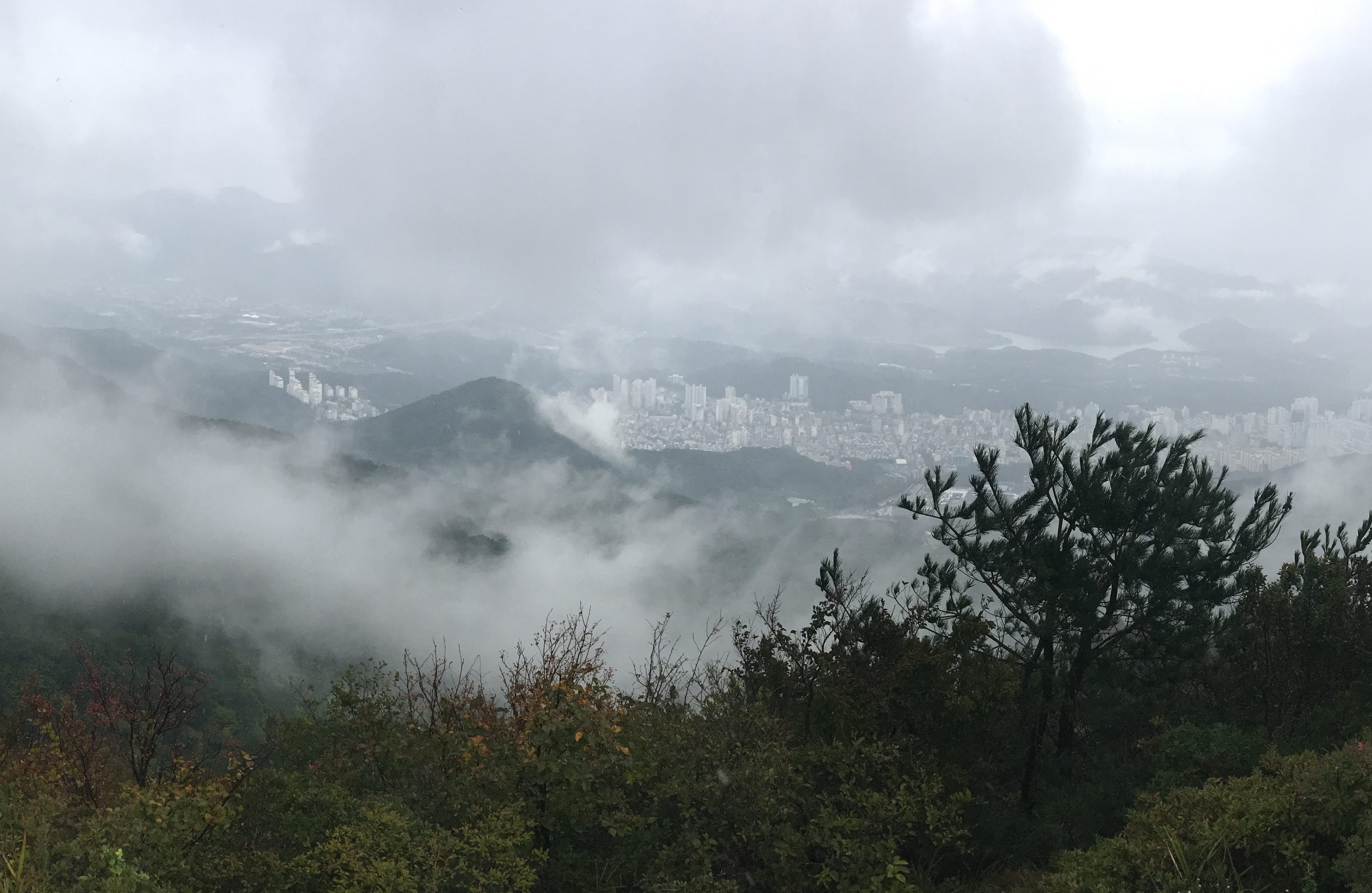
- View of Geumjeong District from Geumjeongsan

- Flag

- Country: South Korea
- Region: Yeongnam
- Provincial level: Busan
- Administrative divisions: 17 administrative dong

Government
  - Mayor: Yoon Il Hyeon (윤일현)

Area
  - Total: 65.29 km^{2} (25.21 sq mi)

Population (2025)
  - Total: 208,216
  - Density: 3,732/km^{2} (9,670/sq mi)
  - Dialect: Gyeongsang
- Website: Geumjeong District Office

Korean name
- Hangul: 금정구
- Hanja: 金井區
- RR: Geumjeong-gu
- MR: Kŭmjŏng-gu

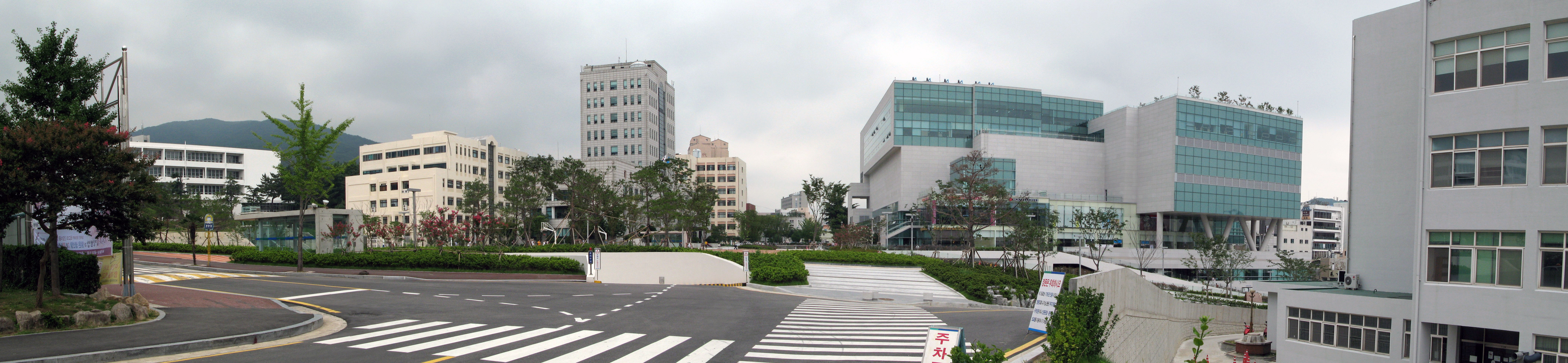
Pusan National University

Geumjeong District (Korean: 금정구) is a district in north central Busan, South Korea. Approximately 7.3% of Busan's population is in Geumjeong District. The Hoedong Reservoir is located on the district's eastern boundary, and the mountain Geumjeongsan on the west. Because of this, 75% of the district's land is restricted from residential development. The district's population is concentrated in the valley of the Oncheoncheon stream, a tributary of the Suyeonggang.

Notable landmarks include Beomeosa, a Buddhist temple dating to the Silla dynasty, and Geumjeongsan, the mountain which overlooks much of the district. Geumjeongsan is topped by the walls of the Geumjeongsanseong, which were built in the Joseon period.

Several colleges and universities are located in Geumjeong District. The most prominent of these is Pusan National University.

Geumjeong District serves as a nexus of transit connections between central Busan and the rest of Korea. The northern end of Busan Subway Line 1 lies in Nopo-dong, where it adjoins Busan's major express bus terminal. In addition, the southern terminus of the Gyeongbu Expressway lies within the district.

== History ==
For most of its history, Geumjeong was officially part of Dongnae, which was itself an independent region until it was amalgamated into the city of Busan in 1942. Geumjeong District was formed by separation from Dongnae in 1988.

Originally Geumjeong consisted of 20 administrative dong, but several changes have been made to leave the current total at 17:

- 1992
  - Bugok-4-dong was created from Bugok-1-dong
- 1998
  - Oryun-dong was absorbed by Bugok-3-dong
  - Seon-dong and Dugu-dong were merged to form Seondugu-dong
  - Nopo-dong and Cheongnyong-dong were merged to form Cheongnyongnopo-dong
- 2009
  - Seo-4-dong was absorbed by Seo-3-dong

== Administrative divisions ==
Geumjeong District is divided into 13 legal dong, which altogether comprise 17 administrative dong, as follows:

Administrative divisions

Key	Administrative dong	Hangeul	Hanja	Area (km^{2})	Households (2012)	Inhabitants (2012)	Density (pop/km^{2})
1	Seo-1-dong	서제1동	書第1洞	0.36	4,484	9,806	27,239
2	Seo-2-dong	서제2동	書第2洞	0.40	5,861	13,897	34,743
3	Seo-3-dong	서제3동	書第3洞	0.92	5,864	14,350	15,598
4	Geumsahoedong-dong	금사회동동	錦絲回東洞	5.52	4,376	10,660	1,931
5	Bugok-1-dong	부곡제1동	釜谷第1洞	0.71	4,834	11,600	16,338
6	Bugok-2-dong	부곡제2동	釜谷第2洞	1.20	6,812	18,868	15,723
7	Bugok-3-dong	부곡제3동	釜谷第3洞	8.16	6,525	18,490	2,266
8	Bugok-4-dong	부곡제4동	釜谷第4洞	0.67	6,360	16,310	24,343
9	Jangjeon-1-dong	장전제1동	長箭第1洞	3.27	6,754	15,995	4,891
10	Jangjeon-2-dong	장전제2동	長箭第2洞	2.06	3,837	11,298	5,484
11	Jangjeon-3-dong	장전제3동	長箭第3洞	0.68	3,868	8,730	12,838
12	Seondugu-dong	선두구동	仙杜邱洞	12.05	1,286	2,857	237
13	Cheongnyeongnopo-dong	청룡노포동	靑龍老圃洞	10.91	3,959	10,192	934
14	Namsan-dong	남산동	南山洞	3.64	13,191	35,255	9,685
15	Guseo-1-dong	구서제1동	久瑞第1洞	3.05	7,071	20,168	6,612
16	Guseo-2-dong	구서제2동	久瑞第2洞	3.19	12,432	37,403	11,725
17	Geumseong-dong	금성동	金城洞	8.41	491	1,211	144
	Geumjeong District	금정구	金井區	65.20	98,005	257,090	3,943

== Education ==
- Dongnae Girls' High School

== Sister cities ==
- Changping, China
- Putuo, China

== Notable people from Geumjeong District ==
- Park Ji-min known by his stage name Jimin, singer-songwriter, dancer, composer and member of one of the most successful boyband BTS is native of Geumjeong District
- Exy (Real Name: Chu So-jung, 추소정), singer-songwriter, rapper, dancer, actress, MC and K-pop idol, leader and member of K-pop girlgroup Cosmic Girls is native of Geumjong District as well.
- Jung Yong-hwa

== See also ==
- Geography of South Korea
- Subdivisions of South Korea
