= Geumjeongsan =

Mountain in Busan, South Korea

Coordinates: 35°16′59″N 129°03′20″E

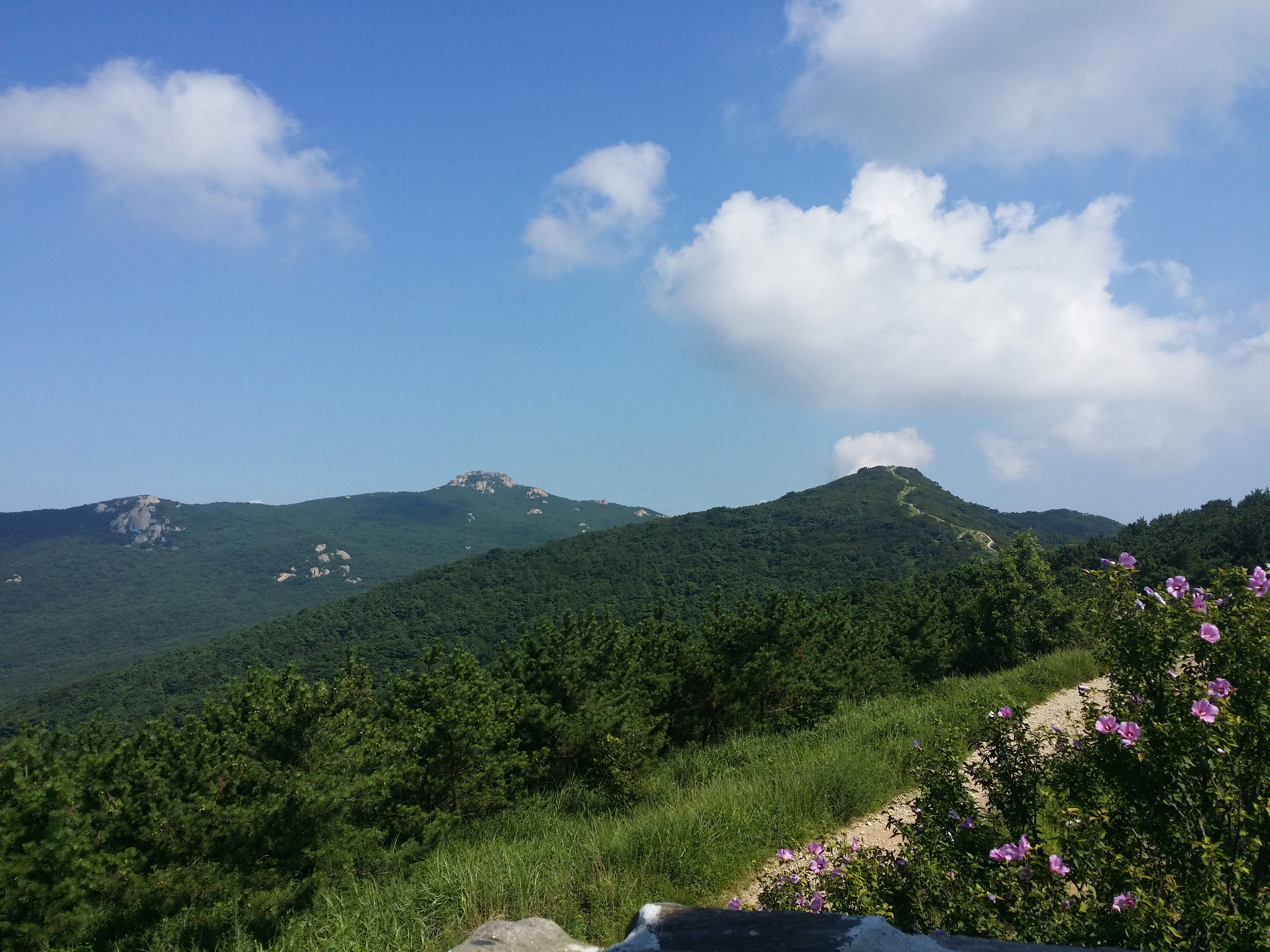
- Geumjeongsan (2016)

Highest point
- Elevation: 801.5 m (2,630 ft)

Geography
- Location: Busan, South Korea

Korean name
- Hangul: 금정산
- Hanja: 金井山
- RR: Geumjeongsan
- MR: Kŭmjŏngsan

Geumjeongsan (Korean: 금정산; lit. 'Golden Well Mountain') is a mountain in Busan, South Korea. Its highest peak, Godangbong, stands at 801.5 meters.

The mountain is popular for hiking, although there is a cable car and bus that goes up much of the way. The mountain also has a village, temple, and fortress on it. The views of Busan and the surrounding area from the peak have been praised.

== Description ==
It has a height of 800.8 m (2,627 ft). The mountain has long been famed for its beauty and structures. It has the temple Beomeosa and Korean fortress Geumjeongsanseong on its slopes.

Geumjeongsan is a popular hiking destination. Some hike up early on New Year's Day, to see the first sunrise of the year. The top is also accessible by cable-car.

Sanseongmaeul (산성마을) is a small rural community built in the mountain valley. It has many restaurants and tourist amenities.

=== Peak ===
Godangbong (고당봉; 姑堂峰) is the highest peak on the mountain. It stands at an altitude of 801.5 meters on the city limit between Busan and Yangsan. Its summit gives a great view of the surroundings, including Gimhae International Airport. On clear days it is possible to see Gimhae and Jinhae District to the south-west and the mountain relief of Tsushima Island half-way in the Korea Strait. It is home to a Gomodang, while Yonghoam Rock and Yongam Cave are located below the south. It takes about an hour and 20 minutes from Beomeosa Temple to the peak via the northern gate.

=== Geumsaem ===
Geumsaem (금샘; 金井; lit. 'golden fountain') is a naturally formed cavity on top of a granite boulder standing off a cliff about 500 meters east of Godang-bong.

According to the legend a golden fish (Geumeo, 그머) came down from the world of Brahma on a 5-coloured cloud and took residence in the golden fountain. The fountain is said to never dry and the colour of its water is always gold. The names of the mountain and Beomeo temple originated from that legend.

Today the legend is still represented in the symbols of Geumjeong District. The gu's logo represent the fountain and the gu's character is a cartoon representation of Geumeo.

== Gallery ==
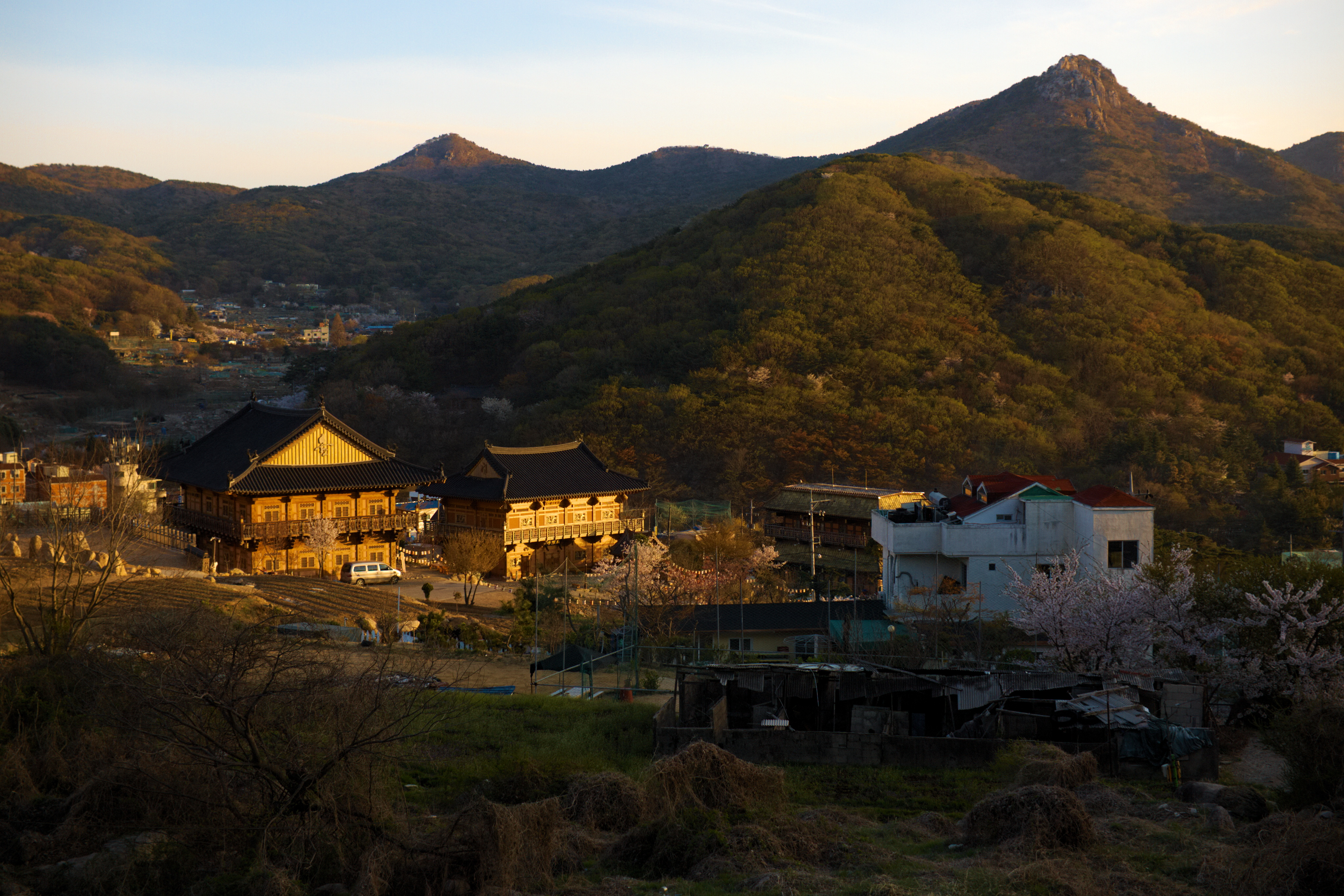
Sanseong, the village on the mountain (2011)

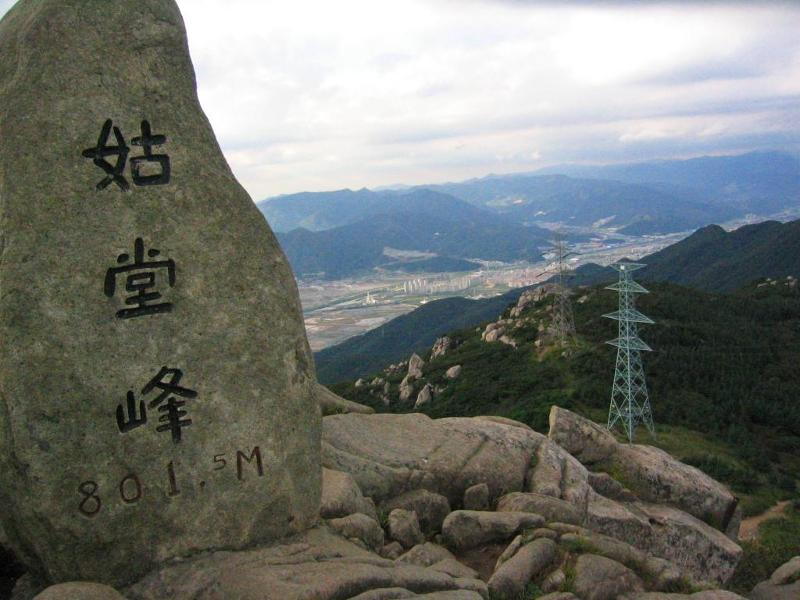
Marker indicating the Godangbong summit (2006)

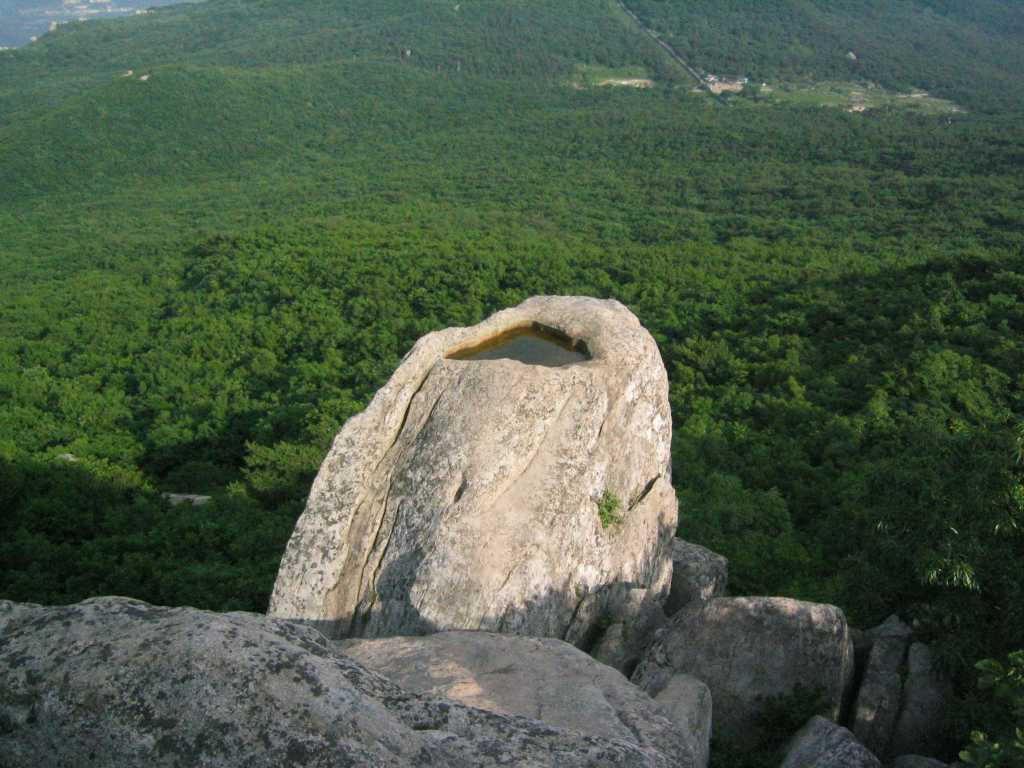
Geumsaem (2006)

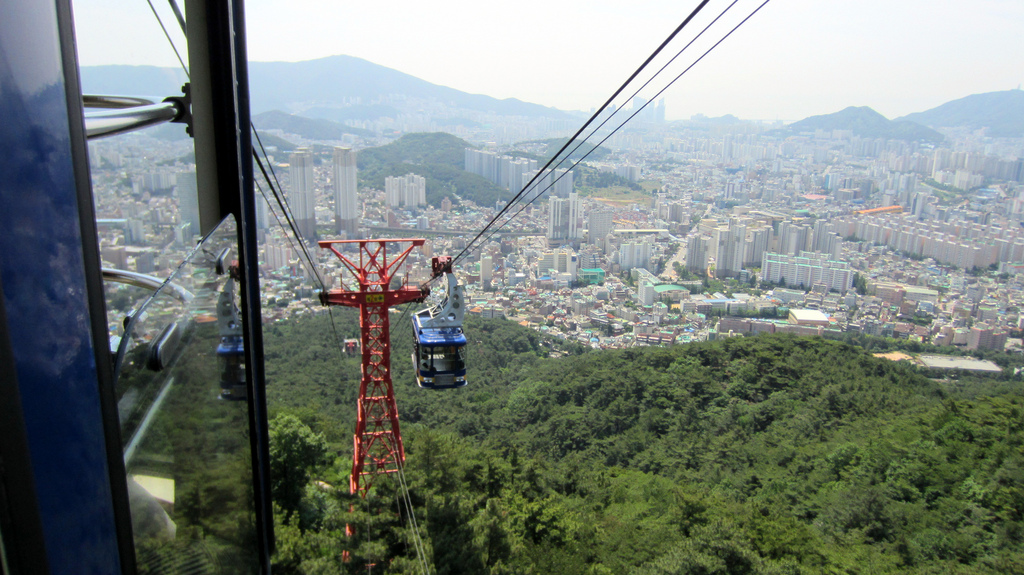
Riding the cable car (2011)

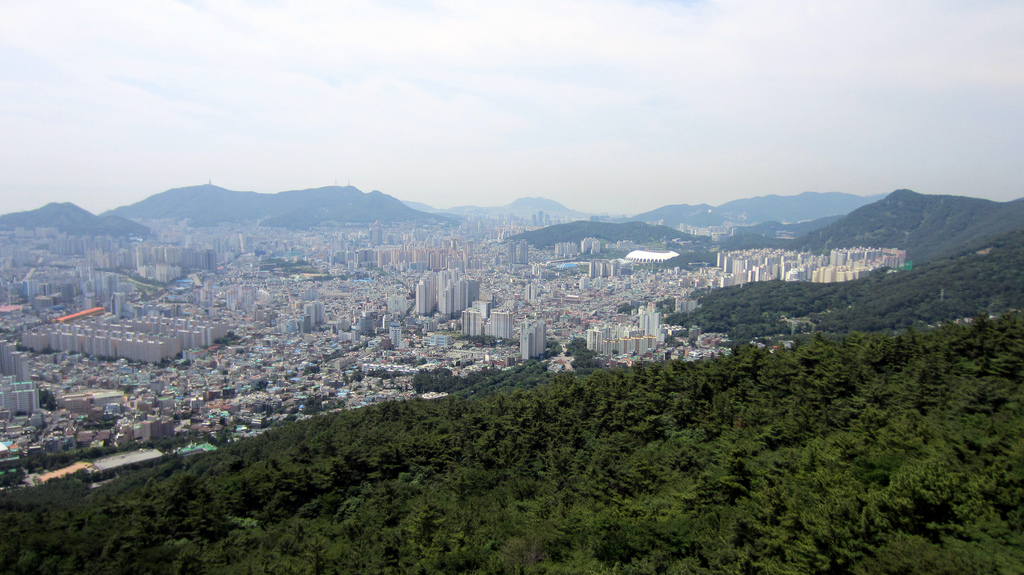
View of Busan from the mountain (2011)

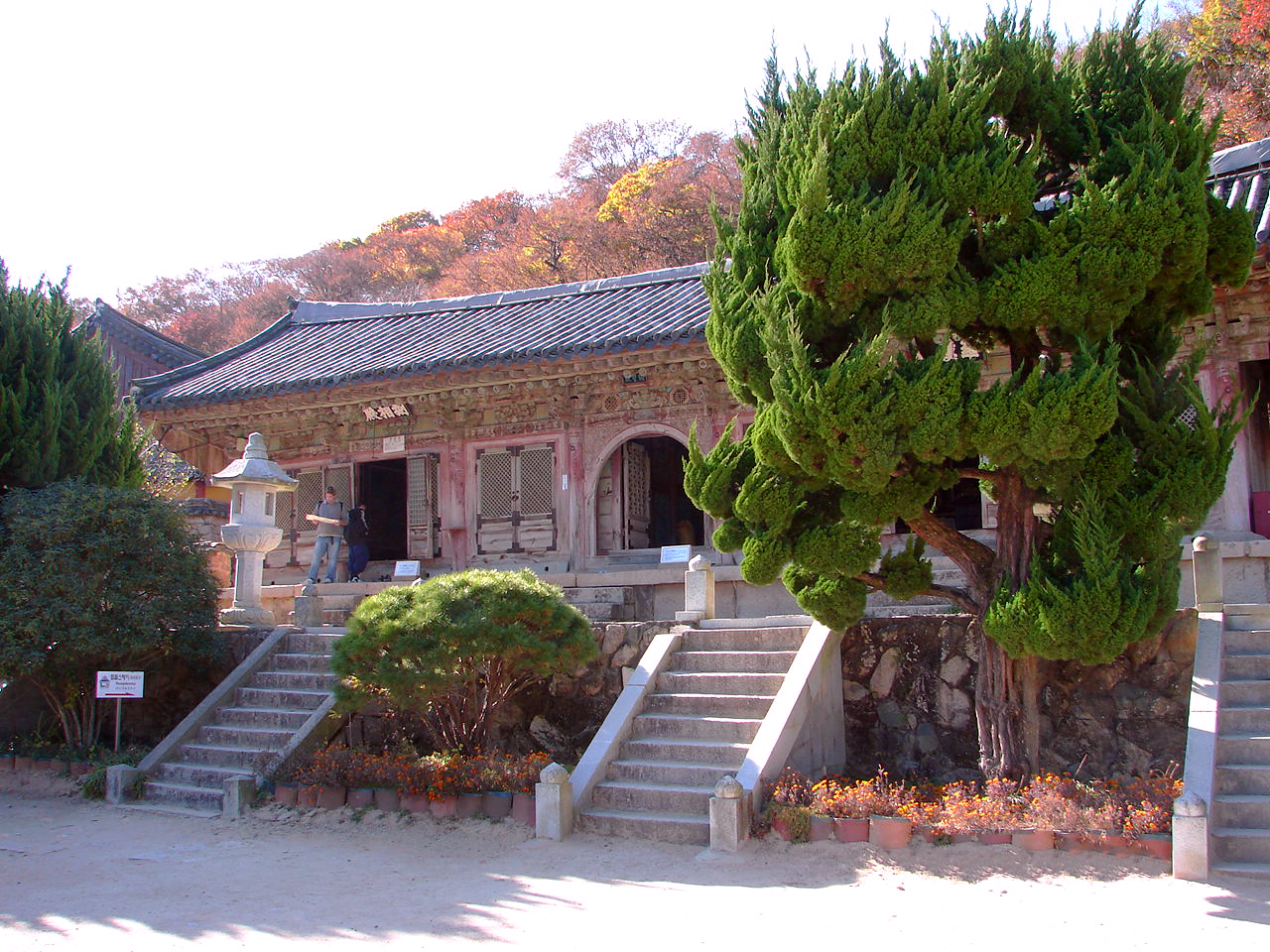
Beomeosa, the temple on the mountain (2007)

== See also ==
- List of mountains in Korea
- Hwangnyeongsan
- Bongraesan
