= National Route 32 (South Korea) =

Road in South Korea

National Route 32
- 국도 제32호선

Route information
- Length: 180.7 km (112.3 mi)
- Existed: 31 August 1971–present

Major junctions
- West end: Taean County, South Chungcheong Province
- East end: Jung District, Daejeon

Location
- Country: South Korea

Highway system
- Highway systems of South Korea; Expressways; National; Local

National Route 32 is a national highway in South Korea connects Taean County to Jung District, Daejeon. It established on 31 August 1971.

== History ==
- August 31, 1971: National Route 32 Seosan ~ Daejeon Line was designated by the General National Highway Route Designation Order.
- February 22, 1972: Starting point extended from 'Taean-myeon (Dongmun-ri), Seosan-gun, South Chungcheong Province' to 'Sowon-myeon (Mallipo), Seosan-gun, South Chungcheong Province'.
- September 8, 1973: Due to realignment, road zone changed from Sinryewon-ri, Yesan-eup, Yesan-gun ~ Jonggyeong-ri, Sinam-myeon (2.85 km section) to 1.54 km, and from Gijisi-ri, Songak-myeon, Dangjin-gun (820m section) to 660m
- August 8, 1975: Total 690m section from Dugok-ri, Sinam-myeon, Yesan-gun ~ Chadong-ri, Sinyang-myeon opened, existing 948m section abolished, 246m section at Hogye-ri, Sagok-myeon, Gongju-gun opened, existing 286m section abolished
- January 9, 1976: Total 3.525 km section from Jonggyeong-ri, Sinam-myeon, Yesan-gun ~ Oncheon-ri, Banpo-myeon, Gongju-gun opened, existing 4.989 km section abolished
- May 26, 1986: Existing designated sections Nammun-ri, Taean-eup, Seosan-gun ~ Dongmun-ri, Eupnae-ri, Seosan-eup, Seosan-gun ~ Dongmun-ri, Chaeun-ri, Dangjin-eup, Dangjin-gun ~ Wondang-ri, Songsan-ri, Ugang-myeon, Dangjin-gun ~ Unsan-ri, Hapdeok-eup, Sanseong-ri, Yesan-eup, Yesan-gun ~ Hyangcheon-ri abolished
- December 22, 1994: Baekgyo-ri, Yugu-myeon, Gongju-gun ~ Nokjeon-ri (1.9 km section) opened, existing section abolished
- July 1, 1996: Starting point changed from 'Sowon-myeon Mallipo, Seosan-gun, South Chungcheong Province' to 'Taean-eup, Seosan-si, South Chungcheong Province', endpoint changed from 'Daejeon-si, South Chungcheong Province' to 'Yuseong-gu, Daejeon Metropolitan City'.
- September 1, 1997: Oncheon-ri, Banpo-myeon, Gongju-si ~ Singwan-dong (16.52 km section) expansion opened, existing 18.41 km section abolished
- December 23, 1997: Sanjeong-ri, Sinpung-myeon, Gongju-si (1.3 km section) opened, existing section abolished
- July 31, 2000: Yeongjeong-ri, Sinpung-myeon, Gongju-si (500m section) new construction opened, existing 560m section abolished
- December 31, 2002: Duya-ri, Geunheung-myeon, Taean County ~ Seongnam-dong, Seosan-si (20.36 km section) expansion opened, existing 18.859 km section abolished, Chaeun-ri, Dangjin-eup, Dangjin-gun ~ Geosan-ri, Sinpyeong-myeon (11.7 km section) expansion opened, existing 13.6 km section abolished
- December 31, 2004: Dongdae-ri, Useong-myeon, Gongju-si ~ Singwan-dong (6.98 km section) expansion opened, existing 7.72 km section abolished
- July 11, 2005: Seosan ~ Dangjin Road (Galsan-ri, Unsan-myeon, Seosan-si ~ Chaeun-ri, Dangjin-eup, Dangjin-gun) 10.28 km section expansion opened, existing 11.7 km section abolished
- October 11, 2005: Seosan ~ Dangjin Road (Jamhong-dong, Seosan-si ~ Galsan-ri, Unsan-myeon) 9.73 km section expansion opened, existing Sanghong-ri, Eumam-myeon, Seosan-si ~ Galsan-ri, Unsan-myeon (9.3 km section) abolished
- December 19, 2005: Geosan-ri, Sinpyeong-myeon, Dangjin-gun ~ Soso-ri, Hapdeok-eup (8.4 km section) expansion opened, existing Geosan-ri, Sinpyeong-myeon, Dangjin-gun ~ Unsan-ri, Hapdeok-eup (10.7 km section) abolished
- December 31, 2005: Jugyo-ri, Yesan-eup, Yesan-gun ~ Sisan-ri, Daesul-myeon (5.34 km section) expansion opened and existing Sanseong-ri, Yesan-eup, Yesan-gun ~ Sisan-ri, Daesul-myeon (5.85 km section) abolished, Sinyang-ri, Sinyang-myeon, Yesan-gun ~ Daedeok-ri (2.64 km section) expansion opened and existing 4.2 km section abolished
- January 3, 2007: Oncheon-ri, Banpo-myeon, Gongju-si (1.1 km section) expansion opened, existing section abolished
- December 20, 2007: Deoksan ~ Yesan Road (Gwanjak-ri, Yesan-eup, Yesan-gun ~ Changso-ri) 2.2 km section expansion opened
- April 21, 2008: Hapdeok ~ Sinryewon Road Section 2 (Sintaek-ri, Sinam-myeon, Yesan-gun ~ Ganyang-ri, Yesan-eup) 5.3 km section expansion opened, existing Sintaek-ri, Sinam-myeon, Yesan-gun ~ Jonggyeong-ri (6.0 km section) abolished
- December 29, 2008: Hapdeok ~ Sinryewon Road Section 1 (Unsan-ri, Hapdeok-eup, Dangjin-gun ~ Sintaek-ri, Sinam-myeon, Yesan-gun) 7.9 km section expansion opened, existing Hapdeok-ri, Hapdeok-eup, Dangjin-gun ~ Sintaek-ri, Sinam-myeon, Yesan-gun (4.02 km section) abolished
- November 17, 2008: Starting point changed from Taean-eup, Seosan-si, South Chungcheong Province to Sowon-myeon Mallipo, Taean County, South Chungcheong Province. Changed from 'Seosan ~ Daejeon Line' to 'Taean ~ Daejeon Line'.
- December 31, 2008: Yesan ~ Sinyang Road (Sisan-ri, Daesul-myeon, Yesan-gun ~ Sinyang-ri, Sinyang-myeon) 7.11 km section expansion opened, existing section abolished
- April 17, 2009: Illam-ri, Seongyeon-myeon, Seosan-si ~ Bujang-ri, Eumam-myeon (7.65 km section) designated as Automobile-only road
- December 21, 2011: Sinpung ~ Useong Road (Sanjeong-ri, Sinpung-myeon, Gongju-si ~ Dongdae-ri, Useong-myeon) 11.68 km section expansion opened, existing Yeongjeong-ri, Sinpung-myeon, Gongju-si ~ Haewol-ri, Sagok-myeon (3.4 km section) and Sinyeong-ri, Sagok-myeon, Gongju-si ~ Dongdae-ri, Useong-myeon (3.7 km section) abolished
- December 29, 2014: Sinyang ~ Sinpung Road (Daedeok-ri, Sinyang-myeon, Yesan-gun ~ Sanjeong-ri, Sinpung-myeon, Gongju-si) 11.64 km section opened, existing 8.3 km section abolished
- December 29, 2016: Eumam ~ Seongyeon Road (Illam-ri, Seongyeon-myeon, Seosan-si ~ Bujang-ri, Eumam-myeon) 7.65 km section new construction opened, existing Seongnim-dong, Seosan-si ~ Bujang-ri, Eumam-myeon (total 5.3 km section) abolished
- December 12, 2017: Mallipo ~ Taean Road (Mohang-ri, Sowon-myeon, Taean County ~ Duya-ri, Geunheung-myeon) 13.14 km section expansion opened, existing Songhyeon-ri, Sowon-myeon, Taean County ~ Duya-ri, Geunheung-myeon (total 2.7 km section) abolished
- December 23, 2019: Due to opening of Eumam ~ Seongyeon Road, the Seosan-si city section (Yecheon-dong, Seosan-si ~ Bujang-ri, Eumam-myeon) was de-designated and the route was changed to the Eumam ~ Seongyeon Road section
- December 30, 2022: Hakbong ~ Gongam Road (Gapdong, Yuseong-gu, Daejeon Metropolitan City ~ Gongam-ri, Banpo-myeon, Gongju-si) 5.4 km section expansion opened

== Main stopovers ==
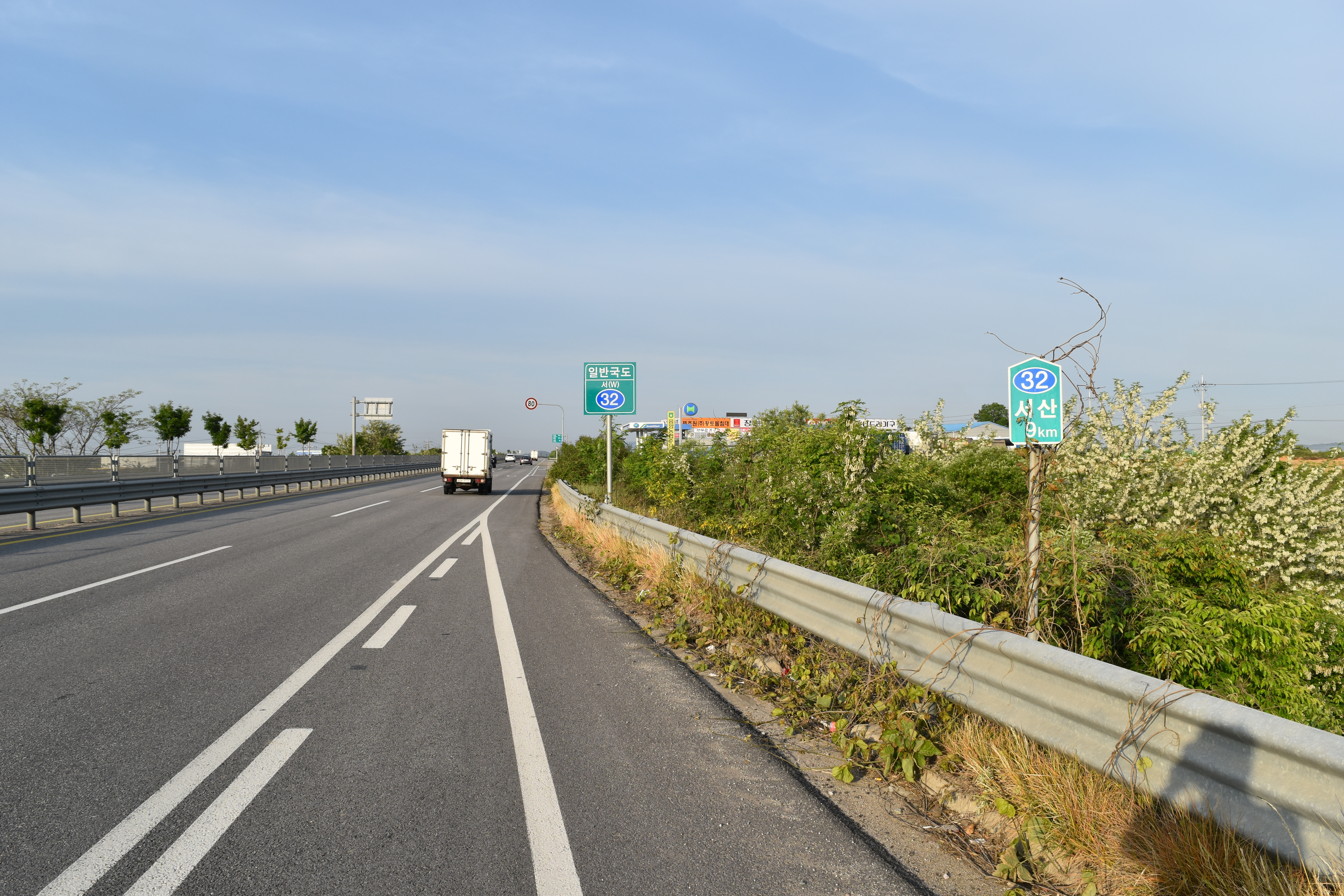
National Route 32

South Chungcheong Province

- Taean County - Seosan - Dangjin - Yesan County - Gongju

Sejong City

- Janggun-myeon

Daejeon

- Yuseong District - Seo District - Jung District

== Major intersections ==
- (■): Motorway

IS: Intersection, IC: Interchange

=== South Chungcheong Province and Sejong City ===
Name	Hangul name	Connection	Location		Note
Mallipo Port	만리포항		Taean County	Sowon-myeon	Terminus
Mallipo Intercity Bus Terminal	만리포시외버스터미널		Taean County	Sowon-myeon	
Galakgul IS	가락굴삼거리	Mohanghang-gil	Taean County	Sowon-myeon	
Songwon IS	송원삼거리	Mohangpado-ro	Taean County	Sowon-myeon	
Songhyeon IS	송현삼거리	Songui-ro	Taean County	Sowon-myeon	
Mallipo High School	만리포고등학교		Taean County	Sowon-myeon	
Sowon IS	소원삼거리	Sogeun-ro	Taean County	Sowon-myeon	
Jangjae IS	장재삼거리	Mageum-ro	Taean County	Sowon-myeon	
Duya IS	두야 교차로	Prefectural Route 96; Prefectural Route 603 (Taeheung-ro)	Taean County	Taean-eup	Prefectural Route 96 overlap
Jangsan IS	장산 교차로	Geunheung-ro; Dongbaek-ro	Taean County	Taean-eup	Prefectural Route 96 overlap
Nammun IS	남문 교차로	National Route 77; Prefectural Route 96 (Anmyeon-daero); Hwandong-ro	Taean County	Taean-eup	Prefectural Route 96 overlap National Route 77 overlap
Pyeongcheon IS	평천 교차로	Dongbaek-ro	Taean County	Taean-eup	National Route 77 overlap
Hwadong IS	화동 교차로	Jungang-ro	Taean County	Taean-eup	National Route 77 overlap
Inpyeong IS	인평 교차로	Ganggyeongbeol-ro; Seonbi-gil	Taean County	Taean-eup	National Route 77 overlap
(Goseong IS)	(고성 교차로)	Jinjang 3-gil Palbong 2-ro	Seosan City	Palbong-myeon	National Route 77 overlap
Eosong IS	어송 교차로	Palbong 1-ro Palbong 2-ro	Seosan City	Palbong-myeon	National Route 77 overlap
Surangjae IS	수랑재 교차로	Chadong-gil; Charigangsu-gil	Seosan City	Inji-myeon	National Route 77 overlap
Hwasu IS	화수 교차로	Chadong-gil; Hwasu 2-gil Hwasuwangdae-gil	Seosan City	Inji-myeon	National Route 77 overlap
Pungjeon IS	풍전 교차로	Suhyeon-ro	Seosan City	Inji-myeon	National Route 77 overlap
Gongrim IS	공림삼거리	Prefectural Route 649 (Muhak-ro)	Seosan City	Seoknam-dong	National Route 77 overlap Prefectural Route 649 overlap
Yecheon IS	예천사거리	National Route 29; National Route 77; Prefectural Route 70 (Chungui-ro); Goun-ro	Seosan City	Seoknam-dong	National Route 77 overlap Prefectural Route 70, 649 overlap
No name	(이름 없음)	Nambusunhwan-ro; Hosugongwon 1-ro	Seosan City	Seoknam-dong	National Route 29 overlap Prefectural Route 70, 649 overlap
Seojung IS	서중사거리	Deokjicheon-ro	Seosan City	Suseok-dong	National Route 29 overlap Prefectural Route 70, 649 overlap
Seonknim IS	석림사거리	National Route 29; Prefectural Route 70 (Jungang-ro)	Seosan City	Suseok-dong	National Route 29 overlap Prefectural Route 70, 649 overlap
Seosan Food IS	먹거리골사거리	Beolmal 1-gil Euljiro 6-ro	Seosan City	Dongmun-dong	Prefectural Route 649 overlap
Aehyang IS	애향삼거리	Goun-ro	Seosan City	Dongmun-dong	Prefectural Route 649 overlap
Jamhong IS	잠홍삼거리	Prefectural Route 649 (Hongcheon-ro)	Seosan City	Dongmun-dong	Prefectural Route 649 overlap
Jamhong IS	잠홍 교차로	Eunam-ro	Seosan City	Eumam-myeon	
Suseok IS	수석 교차로	Suseoksaneom-ro; Eunam-ro	Seosan City	Eumam-myeon	
Eumam IS	음암 교차로	Eunam-ro	Seosan City	Eumam-myeon	
Seongam Bridge	성암대교		Seosan City	Eumam-myeon	
Tapgok IS	탑곡 교차로	Prefectural Route 70; Tapgokgilmajae-gil	Seosan City	Eumam-myeon	Prefectural Route 70 overlap
Unsan IS	운산 교차로	Prefectural Route 70 (Eunam-ro); Seohaean Expressway	Seosan City	Unsan-myeon	Prefectural Route 70 overlap Connect with Seosan IC
Yeomi IS	여미 교차로	Unjeong-ro	Seosan City	Unsan-myeon	
Sagwan IS	사관 교차로	Prefectural Route 647 (Jeongmi-ro)	Dangjin City	Jeongmi-myeon	
Sinsi IS	신시 교차로	Galgol-ro	Dangjin City	Jeongmi-myeon	
Bongsaeng IS	봉생 교차로	Sandong-ro; Sanggusil-ro	Dangjin City	Jeongmi-myeon	
Chaeun Bridge	채운교		Dangjin City	Jeongmi-myeon	
Chaeun IS	채운 교차로	Yeokcheon-ro; Ungok-ro	Dangjin City	Haengjeong-dong	
Tapdong IS (Tapdong Bridge)	탑동 교차로 (탑동교)	Prefectural Route 615 (Seobu-ro)	Dangjin City	Haengjeong-dong	
Wondang IS	원당 교차로	Wondang-ro; Dongbu-ro	Dangjin City	Haengjeong-dong	
Sigok IS	시곡 교차로	Jeongan-ro	Dangjin City	Haengjeong-dong	
Gamgol IS	감골 교차로	Sucheong-ro	Dangjin City	Haengjeong-dong	
Ibam IS	입암 교차로		Dangjin City	Haengjeong-dong	
Dangjin Industrial Complex IS	당진산업단지사거리	Banchon-ro; Sigok-ro	Dangjin City	Haengjeong-dong	
Gijisi IS	기지시 교차로	Prefectural Route 619 (Teulmosi-ro)	Dangjin City	Songak-eup	
Gamamot IS	가마못 교차로	Prefectural Route 633 (Banchon-ro); Seohaean Expressway	Dangjin City	Songak-eup	Connect with Dangjin IC
Banchon IS	반촌 교차로	Banchon-ro; Seohaean Expressway	Dangjin City	Songak-eup	Connect with Dangjin IC
Gwangmyeon IS	광명 간이교차로	Gwangmyeon-gil; Jobisil-gil	Dangjin City	Songak-eup	
Shinpyeong Industrial Complex IS	신평산업단지 교차로	Jobisil-gil	Dangjin City	Shinpyeong-myeon	
Geosan IS	거산 교차로	Dogamgol-gil	Dangjin City	Shinpyeong-myeon	
Geosan 1 IS	거산1 교차로	Dogam-gil; Dongbu-gil; Seopsil-gil	Dangjin City	Shinpyeong-myeon	
Geosan 2 IS	거산2 교차로	National Route 34 (Seohae-ro); Deokpyeong-ro	Dangjin City	Shinpyeong-myeon	
Sango IS	상오 교차로	Sunseong-ro	Dangjin City	Shinpyeong-myeon	
Omi Bridge	오미교	Sango-ro	Dangjin City	Shinpyeong-myeon	
Achan IS	아찬 교차로	Achan 1-ro Seodumul-gil	Dangjin City	Shinpyeong-myeon	
Namwoncheon Bridge	남원천교		Dangjin City	Shinpyeong-myeon	
Jungbang IS	중방 교차로	Bolli-ro	Dangjin City	Sunseong-myeon	
Hapdeok IS	합덕 교차로	Prefectural Route 70 (Myeoncheon-ro)	Dangjin City	Hapdeok-eup	
No name	(이름 없음)	National Route 40; Prefectural Route 622 (Yedeok-ro)	Dangjin City	Hapdeok-eup	
Seongdong IS	성동 교차로	Seongdong-ro; Unsan-ro	Dangjin City	Hapdeok-eup	
Yeonho Bridge Yeonho IS	연호대교 연호 교차로	Baekja-ro	Dangjin City	Hapdeok-eup	
Sinseok IS	신석 교차로	Pyeongya 6-ro	Dangjin City	Hapdeok-eup	
Yedang Bridge	예당대교		Dangjin City	Hapdeok-eup	
Yedang Bridge	예당대교		Yesan County	Sinam-myeon	
Sintaeg IS	신택 교차로	Osin-ro	Yesan County	Sinam-myeon	
Sinjong IS	신종 교차로	Chusa-ro	Yesan County	Sinam-myeon	
Gyechon Bridge	계촌교		Yesan County	Sinam-myeon	
Gyechon Bridge	계촌교		Yesan County	Yesan-eup	
Gyechon IS	계촌 교차로	Gungpyeong-gil	Yesan County	Yesan-eup	
Ganyang IS	간양 교차로	National Route 21; National Route 45 (Chungseo-ro)	Yesan County	Yesan-eup	National Route 21 and National Route 45 overlap
Jeomchon IS	점촌삼거리	Sillyewon-ro	Yesan County	Yesan-eup	National Route 21 and National Route 45 overlap
Changso IS	창소사거리	Changmal-ro; Chusa-ro	Yesan County	Yesan-eup	National Route 21 and National Route 45 overlap
Gwanjak IS	관작삼거리	Sillyewon-ro	Yesan County	Yesan-eup	National Route 21 and National Route 45 overlap
Seokyang IS	석양 교차로	National Route 45; Prefectural Route 70 (Yunbonggil-ro)	Yesan County	Yesan-eup	National Route 21 and National Route 45 overlap Prefectural Route 70 overlap
Balyeon IS	발연 교차로	Prefectural Route 618 (Hwanggeumtteul-ro)	Yesan County	Yesan-eup	National Route 21 overlap Prefectural Route 70, 618 overlap
Yesan Underpass	예산지하차도	Geumo-daero	Yesan County	Yesan-eup	National Route 21 overlap Prefectural Route 70, 618 overlap
Muhan IS	무한 교차로	National Route 21 (Chungseo-ro); Yesan-ro	Yesan County	Yesan-eup	National Route 21 overlap Prefectural Route 70, 618 overlap
Daehoe IS	대회 교차로	Hyeongjegogae-ro	Yesan County	Yesan-eup	Prefectural Route 70, 618 overlap
Sapti IS	삽티 교차로	Geumo-daero	Yesan County	Yesan-eup	Prefectural Route 70, 618 overlap
Hyangcheon Tunnel	향천터널		Yesan County	Yesan-eup	Prefectural Route 70, 618 overlap Approximately 105m
Hyangcheon Tunnel	향천터널		Yesan County	Daesul-myeon	Prefectural Route 70, 618 overlap Approximately 105m
Sisan IS	시산 교차로	Chungnyeongsa-ro; Sisanseo-gil	Yesan County	Daesul-myeon	Prefectural Route 70, 618 overlap
Daesul IS	대술 교차로	Prefectural Route 616; Prefectural Route 618; Prefectural Route 645 (Daesul-ro)	Yesan County	Daesul-myeon	Prefectural Route 70, 616, 618, 645 overlap
Gwima IS	귀마 교차로	Majeonhasam-gil; Burwongwigok-gil	Yesan County	Daesul-myeon	Prefectural Route 70, 616, 645 overlap
Yeon IS	연리 교차로	Baegun-gil	Yesan County	Sinyang-myeon	Prefectural Route 70, 616, 645 overlap
Bulwon IS	불원 교차로	Burwongwigok-gil; Burwonsiwang-gil	Yesan County	Sinyang-myeon	Prefectural Route 70, 616, 645 overlap
Sinyang IS	신양 교차로	Prefectural Route 616 (Cheongsin-ro)	Yesan County	Sinyang-myeon	Prefectural Route 70, 616, 645 overlap
No name	(이름 없음)	Sinyang 3-gil	Yesan County	Sinyang-myeon	Prefectural Route 70, 645 overlap
Daedeok IS	대덕 교차로	Prefectural Route 70; Prefectural Route 645 (Daedeok-ro)	Yesan County	Sinyang-myeon	Prefectural Route 70, 645 overlap
Sindeok IS	신덕 교차로	Chadonggogae-ro	Yesan County	Sinyang-myeon	
Chadong 1 IS	차동1 교차로	Chadongsongjeong-gil	Yesan County	Sinyang-myeon	
Chadong Tunnel	차동터널		Yesan County	Sinyang-myeon	Approximately 522m
Chadong Tunnel	차동터널		Gongju City	Yugu-eup	Approximately 522m
Nokcheon 1 IS	녹천1 교차로	Chadonggogae-ro; Salpojaengi-gil	Gongju City	Yugu-eup	
Nokcheon 2 IS	녹천2 교차로	Yuguoegwang-ro; Gojaedong-gil	Gongju City	Yugu-eup	
Baekgyo Bridge	백교교		Gongju City	Yugu-eup	
Mancheon Tunnel	만천터널		Gongju City	Yugu-eup	Approximately 155m
Mancheon IS	만천 교차로	National Route 39; Prefectural Route 604 (Yuguoegwang-ro)	Gongju City	Yugu-eup	National Route 39 overlap Prefectural Route 604 overlap
Sanjeong 1 IS	산정1 교차로	Sinpung-gil	Gongju City	Sinpung-myeon	National Route 39 overlap Prefectural Route 604 overlap
Sanjeong 2 IS	산정2 교차로	Beoltteum-gil	Gongju City	Sinpung-myeon	National Route 39 overlap Prefectural Route 604 overlap
Sanjeong IS	산정 교차로	National Route 39; Prefectural Route 604 (Chungui-ro)	Gongju City	Sinpung-myeon	National Route 39 overlap Prefectural Route 604 overlap
Sagok IS	사곡 교차로	Prefectural Route 629 (Hogyehwanggol-gil)	Gongju City	Sagok-myeon	
Magoksa IC	마곡사 나들목	Dangjin-Yeongdeok Expressway	Gongju City	Sagok-myeon	
Sagok 2 IS	사곡2 교차로	Magoksa-ro	Gongju City	Sagok-myeon	
No name	(이름 없음)	Jinbatyangjipyeon-gil	Gongju City	Sagok-myeon	
Sinyeong Tunnel	신영터널		Gongju City	Sagok-myeon	Right tunnel: Approximately 700m Left tunnel: Approximately 670m
Sinyeong Tunnel	신영터널		Gongju City	Useong-myeon	Right tunnel: Approximately 700m Left tunnel: Approximately 670m
Useong Bridge	우성교		Gongju City	Useong-myeon	
Useong Elementary School Useong-myeon Office	우성초등학교 우성면사무소		Gongju City	Useong-myeon	
Useong IS	우성 교차로	National Route 36 (Gongsuwon-ro)	Gongju City	Useong-myeon	National Route 36 overlap
Jilma IS	질마 교차로	National Route 36 (Chadong-ro)	Gongju City	Useong-myeon	National Route 36 overlap
Yeonmi Tunnel	연미터널		Gongju City	Useong-myeon	Approximately 895m
Yeonmi Tunnel	연미터널		Gongju City	Shinkwan-dong	Approximately 895m
Bonghwang Middle School Gongju Life Science High School	봉황중학교 공주생명과학고등학교		Gongju City	Shinkwan-dong	
Life Science IS	생명과학고사거리	Prefectural Route 651 (Baekjekeun-gil)	Gongju City	Shinkwan-dong	
Jeonmak IS	전막 교차로	National Route 40; Prefectural Route 96 (Ungjin-ro); Uidang-ro	Gongju City	Shinkwan-dong	Prefectural Route 96 overlap
Jungangro IS	중앙로삼거리	Beonnyeong 1-ro	Gongju City	Shinkwan-dong	Prefectural Route 96 overlap
Geumgang Dunchi Park IS	금강둔치 교차로	Singwan-ro	Gongju City	Shinkwan-dong	Prefectural Route 96 overlap
Daehakro IS	대학로 교차로	Gongjudaehak-ro	Gongju City	Shinkwan-dong	Prefectural Route 96 overlap
Gangbuk IS	강북 교차로	Muryeong-ro	Gongju City	Shinkwan-dong	Prefectural Route 96 overlap
Wolsong IS	월송 교차로	National Route 23 (Charyeong-daero)	Gongju City	Wolsong-dong	Prefectural Route 96 overlap
Jangam IS	장암 교차로	Prefectural Route 96; Prefectural Route 691 (Geumsong-ro)	Sejong City	Janggun-myeon	Prefectural Route 96, 691 overlap
Cheongbyeok Tunnel	청벽대교		Sejong City	Janggun-myeon	Prefectural Route 691 overlap
Cheongbyeok Tunnel	청벽대교		Gongju City	Banpo-myeon	Prefectural Route 691 overlap
Cheongbyeok IS	청벽삼거리	Prefectural Route 691 (Wangheungjangang-ro); Changbyeong-ro	Gongju City	Banpo-myeon	Prefectural Route 691 overlap
Mati Tunnel	마티터널		Gongju City	Banpo-myeon	Approximately 725m
Geumcheon IS	금천 교차로	Gamabong-gil	Gongju City	Banpo-myeon	
Banpo IS	반포 교차로	National Route 1 (Banposejong-ro)	Gongju City	Banpo-myeon	National Route 1 overlap
Gongam IS	공암 교차로	Songgong-ro	Gongju City	Banpo-myeon	National Route 1 overlap
Heuimang IS	희망 교차로	Sanghasin-gil	Gongju City	Banpo-myeon	National Route 1 overlap
Bakjeongja IS	박정자삼거리	Donghaksa 1-ro	Gongju City	Banpo-myeon	National Route 1 overlap
Sapjae IS	삽재 교차로	National Route 1 (Baegun-ro)	Gongju City	Banpo-myeon	National Route 1 overlap
Sapjae	삽재		Gongju City	Banpo-myeon	Continuation into Daejeon

=== Daejeon ===
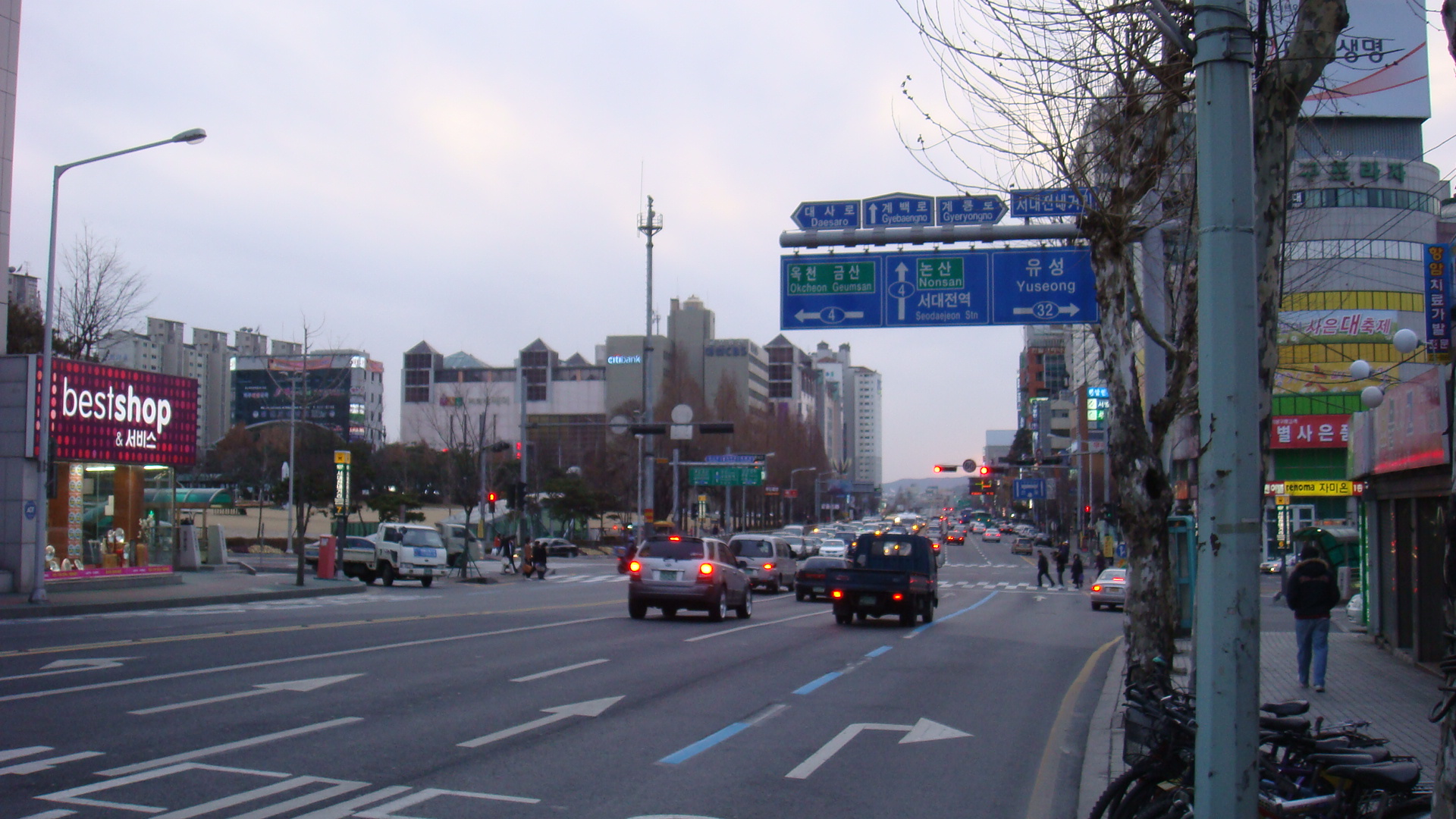
Seodaejeon IS

Name	Hangul name	Connection	Location		Note
Sapjae	삽재		Daejeon	Yuseong District	
Daejeon National Cemetery	국립대전현충원		Daejeon	Yuseong District	
Deokmyeong IS	덕명네거리	Dongseo-daero	Daejeon	Yuseong District	
National Cemetery Station IS	현충원역삼거리	Noeun-ro	Daejeon	Yuseong District	
National Cemetery Station	현충원역		Daejeon	Yuseong District	
No name	(이름 없음)	World Cup-daero	Daejeon	Yuseong District	Yuseong IC; Connected directly with Honam Expressway Branch
Guam Bridge IS	구암교사거리	Prefectural Route 32 (Yuseong-daero)	Daejeon	Yuseong District	Prefectural Route 32 overlap
Guam Station IS	구암역삼거리	Prefectural Route 32 (Yuseong-daero)	Daejeon	Yuseong District	Prefectural Route 32 overlap
Yuseong Intercity Bus Terminal	유성시외버스터미널		Daejeon	Yuseong District	
Yuseong IS (Yuseong Spa Station)	유성네거리 (유성온천역)	Doan-daero	Daejeon	Yuseong District	
Yongban IS	용반네거리	Doandong-ro; Oncheondong-ro	Daejeon	Yuseong District	
Mannyeon Bridge	만년교		Daejeon	Yuseong District	
Mannyeon Bridge	만년교		Daejeon	Seo District	
Mannyeon Bridge IS	만년교네거리	Gapcheon City Highway	Daejeon	Seo District	
Wolpyeong IS	월평삼거리	Wolpyeongseo-ro	Daejeon	Seo District	
Galma IS	갈마네거리	Singalma-ro	Daejeon	Seo District	
Galma IS	갈마삼거리	Galma-ro	Daejeon	Seo District	
Keunma-eul IS (Galma Underpass)	큰마을네거리 (갈마지하차도)	Prefectural Route 57 (Daedeok-daero)	Daejeon	Seo District	
Sungeorisaem IS	숭어리샘네거리	Munjeong-ro	Daejeon	Seo District	
Tanbang Underpass	탄방지하차도	Gyeryong-ro 553beon-gil Munjeong-ro 48beon-gil	Daejeon	Seo District	
Tanbang IS	탄방네거리	Dosol-ro	Daejeon	Seo District	
Yongmun Station IS	용문역네거리	Dosan-ro	Daejeon	Seo District	
Suchim Bridge	수침교		Daejeon	Seo District	
Suchim Bridge	수침교		Daejeon	Jung District	
Yongdu IS (Gyeryong Overpass)	용두네거리 (계룡육교)	Oryu-ro; Eodeongmaeul-ro	Daejeon	Jung District	
Yongdu-dong Intercity bus stop	용두동시외버스정류소		Daejeon	Jung District	
Oryong Station IS	오룡역네거리	Dongseo-daero	Daejeon	Jung District	
Seodaejeon Elementary School IS	서대전초교삼거리	Seonhoe-ro	Daejeon	Jung District	
Seodaejeon IS Seodaejeon Negeori Station	서대전네거리 서대전네거리역	National Route 4 (Gyebaek-ro); Jungang-ro	Daejeon	Jung District	Terminus
