= National Route 45 (South Korea) =

Road in South Korea

National Route 45
- Seosan-Gapyeong Line 국도 제45호선

Route information
- Length: 202.6 km (125.9 mi)
- Existed: 14 March 1981–present

Major junctions
- South end: Seosan, South Chungcheong Province
- North end: Gapyeong County, Gyeonggi Province

Location
- Country: South Korea

Highway system
- Highway systems of South Korea; Expressways; National; Local

National Route 45 is a national highway in South Korea connects between Seosan and Gapyeong County. It was established on 14 March 1981.

== Main stopovers ==
South Chungcheong Province

- Seosan - Yesan County - Asan

Gyeonggi Province

- Pyeongtaek - Anseong - Yongin - Gwangju - Hanam - Namyangju - Gapyeong County

== Major intersections ==
- (■): Motorway

IS: Intersection, IC: Interchange

=== South Chungcheong Province ===
Name	Hangul name	Connection	Location		Note
Haemi IS	해미 교차로	National Route 29; Prefectural Route 70 (Jungang-ro) (Naepo-ro); Prefectural Route 647 (Nammun 1-ro)	Seosan City	Haemi-myeon	Terminus; Prefectural Route 70 overlap
Jamyang IS	잠양 교차로	Nammun 2-ro	Seosan City	Haemi-myeon	Prefectural Route 70 overlap
Haemi IC	해미 나들목	Seohaean Expressway	Seosan City	Haemi-myeon	Prefectural Route 70 overlap
Sansu IS	산수 교차로	Sansu-ro	Seosan City	Haemi-myeon	Prefectural Route 70 overlap
Sansu 1 Bridge Sansu 2 Bridge	산수1교 산수2교		Seosan City	Haemi-myeon	Prefectural Route 70 overlap
Daegok IS	대곡 교차로	Sansu-ro	Seosan City	Haemi-myeon	Prefectural Route 70 overlap
Hanseo University Entrance	한서대학교입구	Hanseo 1-ro	Seosan City	Haemi-myeon	Prefectural Route 70 overlap
Wonteo IS	원터 교차로	Daegogwonteo-gil	Seosan City	Haemi-myeon	Prefectural Route 70 overlap
Songdeokam IS	송덕암 교차로	Keungol-ro	Seosan City	Haemi-myeon	Prefectural Route 70 overlap
Daegok IS	대곡 교차로	Daegok 1-gil	Seosan City	Haemi-myeon	Prefectural Route 70 overlap
Haemi Tunnel	해미터널		Seosan City	Haemi-myeon	Prefectural Route 70 overlap Right tunnel: Approximately 308m Left tunnel: Approximately 426m
Haemi Tunnel			Yesan County	Deoksan-myeon	Prefectural Route 70 overlap Right tunnel: Approximately 308m Left tunnel: Approximately 426m
Deoksan Tunnel	덕산터널		Yesan County	Deoksan-myeon	Prefectural Route 70 overlap Right tunnel: Approximately 210m Left tunnel: Approximately 209m
Gwangcheon IS	광천 교차로	Nameundeul-ro; Daechigwangcheon-gil	Yesan County	Deoksan-myeon	Prefectural Route 70 overlap
Daechi IS	대치 교차로	Daechi 3-gil	Yesan County	Deoksan-myeon	Prefectural Route 70 overlap
Daechi 1 IS	대치1 교차로	Deoksanoncheon-ro	Yesan County	Deoksan-myeon	Prefectural Route 70 overlap
Sudeoksa IS	수덕사 교차로	National Route 40 (Sudeoksa-ro)	Yesan County	Deoksan-myeon	National Route 40 overlap Prefectural Route 70 overlap
Deoksanoncheon IS	덕산온천 교차로	Deoksanoncheon-ro	Yesan County	Deoksan-myeon	National Route 40 overlap Prefectural Route 70 overlap
Sinri Bridge	신리대교		Yesan County	Deoksan-myeon	National Route 40 overlap Prefectural Route 70 overlap
Sinri Bridge			Yesan County	Sapgyo-eup	National Route 40 overlap Prefectural Route 70 overlap
Songsan IS	송산 교차로	National Route 40; Prefectural Route 609 (Docheon-daero)	Yesan County	Sapgyo-eup	National Route 40 overlap Prefectural Route 70 overlap
Anchi IS	안치 교차로	Chungui-ro	Yesan County	Sapgyo-eup	Prefectural Route 70 overlap
Sapgyo IS	삽교 교차로	Chungui-ro	Yesan County	Sapgyo-eup	Prefectural Route 70 overlap
Jaetddeul Bridge Sapdari Bridge	잿뜰교 삽다리교		Yesan County	Sapgyo-eup	Prefectural Route 70 overlap
No name	(이름 없음)	Chungui-ro	Yesan County	Sapgyo-eup	Prefectural Route 70 overlap
Ddemal IS	떼말 교차로	Sapgyo-ro 4-gil	Yesan County	Sapgyo-eup	Prefectural Route 70 overlap
Duri IS	두리 교차로	Sapgyoyeok-ro; Durumeori-gil	Yesan County	Sapgyo-eup	Prefectural Route 70 overlap
Banga IS	방아 교차로	Sapgyo-ro; Banga-gil	Yesan County	Sapgyo-eup	Prefectural Route 70 overlap
Jwabang Bridge	좌방교		Yesan County	Sapgyo-eup	Prefectural Route 70 overlap
Jwabang Bridge			Yesan County	Oga-myeon	Prefectural Route 70 overlap
Jwabang IS	좌방 교차로	Jwabunyangmak-ro	Yesan County	Oga-myeon	Prefectural Route 70 overlap
Yesan Tax Office	예산세무서		Yesan County	Oga-myeon	Prefectural Route 70 overlap
Imseong IS	임성 교차로	Osin-ro	Yesan County	Oga-myeon	Prefectural Route 70 overlap
Imseong Middle School	임성중학교		Yesan County	Oga-myeon	Prefectural Route 70 overlap
Yeoktap IS	역탑 교차로	Ogajungang-ro; Yeoktaphanbat-gil	Yesan County	Oga-myeon	Prefectural Route 70 overlap
Woncheon IS	원천 교차로	Woncheonochon-gil; Woncheonoecheon-gil	Yesan County	Oga-myeon	Prefectural Route 70 overlap
Sinwon 2 Bridge	신원2교		Yesan County	Oga-myeon	Prefectural Route 70 overlap
Sinwon 2 Bridge			Yesan County	Yesan-eup	Prefectural Route 70 overlap
Muhancheon Bridge	무한천교		Yesan County	Yesan-eup	Prefectural Route 70 overlap
Seokyang IS	석양 교차로	National Route 21; National Route 32; Prefectural Route 70 (Chungseo-ro)	Yesan County	Yesan-eup	National Route 21, National Route 32 overlap Prefectural Route 70 overlap
Gwanjak IS	관작삼거리	Sillyewon-ro	Yesan County	Yesan-eup	National Route 21, National Route 32 overlap Prefectural Route 70 overlap
Changso IS	창소사거리	Changmal-ro; Chusa-ro	Yesan County	Yesan-eup	National Route 21, National Route 32 overlap Prefectural Route 70 overlap
Jeomchon IS	점촌삼거리	Sillyewon-ro	Yesan County	Yesan-eup	National Route 21, National Route 32 overlap Prefectural Route 70 overlap
Ganyang IS	간양 교차로	National Route 32 (Yedangpyeongya-ro)	Yesan County	Yesan-eup	National Route 21, National Route 32 overlap Prefectural Route 70 overlap
Geumsan-ri IS	금산리 교차로	Prefectural Route 645 (Asanman-ro)	Asan City	Dogo-myeon	National Route 21 overlap Prefectural Route 645 overlap
Geumsan IS	금산삼거리	Oncheon-daero 207beon-gil	Asan City	Dogo-myeon	National Route 21 overlap Prefectural Route 645 overlap
Sijeon IS	시전사거리	Prefectural Route 645 (Dogosan-ro)	Asan City	Dogo-myeon	National Route 21 overlap Prefectural Route 645 overlap
Dogooncheon station	도고온천역		Asan City	Dogo-myeon	National Route 21 overlap
Hyangsan IS	향산사거리	Sintong-gil	Asan City	Dogo-myeon	National Route 21 overlap
Soonchunhyang University	순천향대학교		Asan City	Sinchang-myeon	National Route 21 overlap
Soonchunhyang University IS	순천향대삼거리	Prefectural Route 623 (Suncheonhyang-ro)	Asan City	Sinchang-myeon	National Route 21 overlap Prefectural Route 623 overlap
Eupnae IS	읍내삼거리	Prefectural Route 623 (Seobunam-ro)	Asan City	Sinchang-myeon	National Route 21 overlap Prefectural Route 623 overlap
Eupnae IS	읍내 교차로	National Route 21; National Route 39 (Onyangsunhwan-ro)	Asan City	Sinchang-myeon	National Route 21 overlap
Namseong IS	남성삼거리	Haengmok-ro	Asan City	Sinchang-myeon	
Asan Deuksan Agriculture Complex	아산득산농공단지	Oncheon-daero 1122beon-gil	Asan City	Onyang-dong	
Deuksan Overpass	득산육교		Asan City	Onyang-dong	
Sinjeong IS	신정삼거리	Gokgyocheon-ro	Asan City	Onyang-dong	
Bangchuk-dong IS	방축동사거리	Oncheon-daero; Sinjeong-ro	Asan City	Onyang-dong	
Asan Office of Education	아산교육지원청		Asan City	Onyang-dong	
Silok IS	실옥사거리	Asan-ro	Asan City	Onyang-dong	
Sicheong IS	시청사거리	Simin-ro	Asan City	Onyang-dong	
Museum IS	박물관사거리	Munhwa-ro; Chungmu-ro	Asan City	Onyang-dong	
Onyang Folk Museum	온양민속박물관		Asan City	Onyang-dong	
Chungmu IS	충무 교차로	Gokgyocheon-ro	Asan City	Onyang-dong	
Chungmu Bridge	충무교		Asan City	Onyang-dong	
Chungmu Bridge			Asan City	Yeomchi-eup	
Songgok IS	송곡사거리	Eunhaengnamu-gil	Asan City	Yeomchi-eup	
Seokjeong IS	석정삼거리	Prefectural Route 624 (Isunsin-daero)	Asan City	Yeomchi-eup	Prefectural Route 624 overlap
Bangsu IS	방수사거리	Prefectural Route 624 (Yeomchi-ro)	Asan City	Yeomchi-eup	Prefectural Route 624 overlap
Banghyeon IS	방현사거리	Banghyeondong-gil; Banghyeonseo-gil	Asan City	Yeomchi-eup	
Chungmu Amusement Park	충무유원지		Asan City	Yeomchi-eup	
Dongjeong IS	동정삼거리	Dongjeong-gil	Asan City	Yeomchi-eup	
Eumbong IS	음봉 교차로	Prefectural Route 628; Prefectural Route 70 (Asan spa-ro) (Eumbong-ro)	Asan City	Eumbong-myeon	Prefectural Route 70 overlap
Eoreumok Tunnel	어르목터널		Asan City	Eumbong-myeon	Prefectural Route 70 overlap Right tunnel: Approximately 728m Left tunnel: Approximately 680m
Wonnam IS	원남 교차로	Prefectural Route 70 (Yeonamyulgeum-ro)	Asan City	Eumbong-myeon	Prefectural Route 70 overlap
Origol IS	오리골삼거리	Chungmu-ro1181beon-gil	Asan City	Dunpo-myeon	
Bongjae IS	봉재삼거리	Bongsin-ro	Asan City	Dunpo-myeon	
Sanjeon IS Sinhang IS	산전사거리 신항 교차로	National Route 43 (Sejongpyeongtaek-ro); Gwanyong-ro; Haewian-gil	Asan City	Dunpo-myeon	
Gwandae IS	관대삼거리	Gwandae-gil	Asan City	Dunpo-myeon	
Gwandae Welfare IS	관대복지사거리	Haewi-gil	Asan City	Dunpo-myeon	
Gwanteo IS	관터사거리	Gwandae-gil	Asan City	Dunpo-myeon	
Gwanteo IS	관터삼거리	Gwandae-gil	Asan City	Dunpo-myeon	
Dunpo IS	둔포 교차로	National Route 34 (Jangyeongsil-ro); Chungmu-ro	Asan City	Dunpo-myeon	National Route 34 overlap
Seokdeun IS	석근 교차로	National Route 34 (Samsa-ro)	Asan City	Dunpo-myeon	National Route 34 overlap
Unyong IS	운용 교차로	Chungmu-ro	Asan City	Dunpo-myeon	
Dunpocheon Bridge	둔포천교		Asan City	Dunpo-myeon	Continuation into Gyeonggi Province

=== Gyeonggi Province ===
Name	Hangul name	Connection	Location		Note
Dunpocheon Bridge	둔포천교		Pyeongtaek City	Pyeongseong-eup	South Chungcheong Province - Gyeonggi Province border line
Seokgeun IS	석근 교차로	Dunpojungang-ro	Pyeongtaek City	Pyeongseong-eup	
Seokgeun IS	석근삼거리	Gyeyang-ro	Pyeongtaek City	Pyeongseong-eup	
CPX IS	CPX오거리	Sageori-gil; Songhwa 2-gil	Pyeongtaek City	Pyeongseong-eup	
Daesa IS	대사 교차로	Songhwa 1-gil	Pyeongtaek City	Pyeongseong-eup	
Songhwa IS	송화사거리	Paengseongsonghwa-ro; Sageori-gil	Pyeongtaek City	Pyeongseong-eup	
Namsan IS	남산삼거리	Anjeongsunhwan-ro	Pyeongtaek City	Pyeongseong-eup	
No name	(이름 없음)	Paengseongnamsan 4-gil	Pyeongtaek City	Pyeongseong-eup	
Chupal Industrial Complex IS	추팔공업단지사거리	Songhwataekji-ro	Pyeongtaek City	Pyeongseong-eup	
Pyeonggung IS	평궁삼거리	Anjeong-ro	Pyeongtaek City	Pyeongseong-eup	
Pyeonggung IS	평궁사거리	Paengseongbuk-ro; Pyeonggung-gil	Pyeongtaek City	Pyeongseong-eup	
Singung IS	신궁 교차로	National Route 38 (Seodong-daero); Paengseong-ro	Pyeongtaek City	Pyeongseong-eup	National Route 38 overlap
Anseongcheon 1 Bridge	안성천1교		Pyeongtaek City	Pyeongseong-eup	National Route 38 overlap
Anseongcheon 1 Bridge			Pyeongtaek City	Wonpyeong-dong	National Route 38 overlap
Sindae Overpass	신대육교	Pyeongnam-ro; Eunsilgoga-gil	Pyeongtaek City	Wonpyeong-dong	National Route 38 overlap
Bangchuk IS	방축사거리	Bangchuk-gil; Donggo 2-gil	Pyeongtaek City	Godeok-myeon	National Route 38 overlap
Godeok IS	고덕 교차로	National Route 38 (Saedong-daero)	Pyeongtaek City	Godeok-myeon	National Route 38 overlap
Pyeongtaek International Hospital	평택국제병원		Pyeongtaek City	Godeok-myeon	
Jije IS	지제 교차로	Jije-ro	Pyeongtaek City	Segyo-dong	
Songtan IS	송탄 교차로	National Route 1 (Gyeonggi-daero)	Pyeongtaek City	Segyo-dong	
Chilgoe IS	칠괴 교차로	Chilgoe-gil	Pyeongtaek City	Segyo-dong	
Dongsak IS	동삭 교차로	Prefectural Route 317 (Dongsak-ro)	Pyeongtaek City	Songtan-dong	
Chilwon IS	칠원 교차로	Saemal-ro	Pyeongtaek City	Songtan-dong	
Cheongyong IS	청용 교차로	Prefectural Route 302 (Manse-ro)	Pyeongtaek City	Bijeon-dong	
Cheongyong Bridge	청용교		Pyeongtaek City	Bijeon-dong	
Cheongyong Bridge			Anseong City	Wongok-myeon	
West Anseong IC	서안성 나들목	Pyeongtaek-Jecheon Expressway	Anseong City	Wongok-myeon	
Chilgok IS	칠곡 교차로	Manse-ro; Garwol-gil	Anseong City	Wongok-myeon	
Manse Tunnel	만세터널		Anseong City	Wongok-myeon	Approximately 1,461m
Manse Tunnel			Anseong City	Yangseong-myeon	Approximately 1,461m
Yangseong Tunnel	양성터널		Anseong City	Yangseong-myeon	Approximately 400m
Yangseong IS	양성 교차로	Yangseong-ro	Anseong City	Yangseong-myeon	
Jangseo IS	장서 교차로	Prefectural Route 314 (Yangseong-ro)	Anseong City	Yangseong-myeon	
Myobong Bridge	묘봉교		Yongin City	Cheoin District Idong-eup	
Myobong IS	묘봉 교차로	Prefectural Route 82 (Gyeonggidong-ro)	Yongin City	Cheoin District Idong-eup	
Songjeon IS	송전 교차로	Baegok-daero	Yongin City	Cheoin District Idong-eup	
Simi IS	시미 교차로	Baegok-daero	Yongin City	Cheoin District Idong-eup	
Deokseong IS	덕성 교차로	Baegok-daero	Yongin City	Cheoin District Idong-eup	
Woncheon IS	원천 교차로	Prefectural Route 318 (Baekja-ro); Prefectural Route 84	Yongin City	Cheoin District Idong-eup	
Namro IS Singima-eul Entrance IS	남리 교차로 신기마을입구삼거리	Baegok-daero	Yongin City	Cheoin District	
Okhyeon Bus Stop IS	옥현정류장삼거리	Pyeongok-ro	Yongin City	Cheoin District	
Yongin Electrical Substation Entrance	용인변전소입구	Baegok-daero 1005beon-gil	Yongin City	Cheoin District	
Namdong IS	남동사거리	Myeongji-ro	Yongin City	Cheoin District	
Taesung Middle School Taesung High School	태성중학교 태성고등학교		Yongin City	Cheoin District	
Lotte Mart IS	롯데마트삼거리	Baegok-daero 1068beon-gil	Yongin City	Cheoin District	
Terminal IS (Yongin Public Bus Terminal)	터미널사거리 (용인공용버스터미널)	National Route 42; Prefectural Route 98 (Jungbu-daero)	Yongin City	Cheoin District	
Yongin IS	용인사거리	Geumnyeong-ro	Yongin City	Cheoin District	
Stadium–Songdam College station	운동장·송담대역	Geumhak-ro	Yongin City	Cheoin District	
Sky Gas Station Musu Bridge IS Musumak Bus Stop	스카이주유소삼거리 무수교삼거리 무수막정류장단일로		Yongin City	Cheoin District	
Yurim-dong Community Center	유림동주민센터	Baegok-daero 1313beon-gil	Yongin City	Cheoin District	
Beodeusil IS	버드실사거리	Yurim-ro; Hanteo-ro	Yongin City	Cheoin District	
Yurim Nonghyup IS Jungang Church IS Bangchuk-dong IS Yongin IC Entrance IS	유림농협삼거리 중앙교회삼거리 방축동삼거리 용인IC입구삼거리		Yongin City	Cheoin District	
Yongin IC	용인 나들목	Yeongdong Expressway	Yongin City	Cheoin District	
Gyeongancheon Bridge Dunjeon IS	경안천교 둔전삼거리		Yongin City	Cheoin District	
Pogok IS	포곡삼거리	Pogok-ro	Yongin City	Cheoin District Pogok-eup	
Jaewon Villa Donggyeong Gas Station IS Dosama-eul IS	재원빌라앞 동경주유소사거리 도사마을사거리		Yongin City	Cheoin District Pogok-eup	
Yuun-ri Entrance IS	유운리입구삼거리	Okhyeon-ro	Yongin City	Cheoin District Pogok-eup	
Taewon Stone IS Chohyeon Bridge	태원석재삼거리 초현교		Yongin City	Cheoin District Pogok-eup	
Seyoung Metal IS Sanjeong Gas Station IS	세영철강삼거리 산정주유소삼거리		Yongin City	Cheoin District Mohyeon-eup	
Choburi Rest Area IS	초부리휴게소삼거리	Chobu-ro	Yongin City	Cheoin District Mohyeon-eup	
Chungkwang Concrete IS	청광레미콘삼거리	Galdam-ro	Yongin City	Cheoin District Mohyeon-eup	
Galdam IS	갈담사거리	Garwol-ro; Padam-ro	Yongin City	Cheoin District Mohyeon-eup	
Mannam Gas Station IS Wangsan Elementary School IS Mohyeon Police Box	만남주유소사거리 왕산초등학교삼거리 모현파출소앞		Yongin City	Cheoin District Mohyeon-eup	
Oedae IS	외대사거리	Munhyeon-ro; Oedae-ro	Yongin City	Cheoin District Mohyeon-eup	
Jangjeonpyeongap IS Mohyeon IS Mosanma-eul Entrance IS	장전평앞삼거리 모현삼거리 모산마을입구삼거리		Yongin City	Cheoin District Mohyeon-eup	
Maesan Bridge	매산교		Yongin City	Cheoin District Mohyeon-eup	
Maesan Bridge			Gwangju City	Opo-eup	
Maesan IS	매산삼거리	Maejari-gil	Gwangju City	Opo-eup	
Daeseong Apartment	대성아파트앞		Gwangju City	Opo-eup	
Yangbeol IS	양벌삼거리	Yangbeol-ro	Gwangju City	Opo-eup	
Yangbeol Bridge	양벌대교		Gwangju City	Opo-eup	
Gosan IC	고산 나들목	National Route 43 (Poeun-daero)	Gwangju City	Opo-eup	National Route 43 overlap
Gwangnam High School	광남고등학교		Gwangju City	Gwangnam-dong	National Route 43 overlap
Taejeon JCT	태전 분기점	National Route 3 (Seongnam-Janghowon Motorway)	Gwangju City	Gwangnam-dong	National Route 43 overlap
Sinjeongji IS	신장지삼거리	Sunam-ro	Gwangju City	Gwangnam-dong	National Route 43 overlap
Jangji IC	장지 나들목	National Route 3 (Gyeongchung-daero)	Gwangju City	Gwangnam-dong	National Route 43 overlap
Tanbeolma-eul	탄벌마을앞	Podori-ro	Gwangju City	Songjeong-dong	National Route 43 overlap
Beolwon IS	벌원 교차로	Ibaejae-ro; Pabal-ro	Gwangju City	Songjeong-dong	National Route 43 overlap
(Songjeong Overpass)	(송정육교)	Haengjeongtaun-ro	Gwangju City	Songjeong-dong	National Route 43 overlap
Gwangju City Hall	광주시청		Gwangju City	Songjeong-dong	National Route 43 overlap
Daeju Overpass	대주육교	Jungang-ro 335beon-gil	Gwangju City	Songjeong-dong	National Route 43 overlap
Songjeong IS	송정 교차로	Jungang-ro	Gwangju City	Songjeong-dong	National Route 43 overlap
Gyeonggi Gwangju IC (Gwangju IC Entrance IS)	경기광주 나들목 (광주IC입구삼거리)	Jungbu Expressway; Haegong-ro	Gwangju City	Namhansanseong-myeon	National Route 43 overlap Haegong-ro connected with Jungbu Expressway
Sangbeoncheon-ri IS	상번천리사거리	National Route 43; Prefectural Route 342 (Hoean-daero); Haegong-ro	Gwangju City	Namhansanseong-myeon	National Route 43 overlap Prefectural Route 342 overlap
Domachigogae	도마치고개		Gwangju City	Namhansanseong-myeon	Prefectural Route 342 overlap
Domachigogae			Gwangju City	Toechon-myeon	Prefectural Route 342 overlap
Doma IS	도마삼거리	Prefectural Route 88; Prefectural Route 342 (Cheonjinam-ro)	Gwangju City	Toechon-myeon	Prefectural Route 88, 342 overlap
Gwahak-dong Entrance	과학동입구		Gwangju City	Namjong-myeon	Prefectural Route 88 overlap
Paldang Dam IS	팔당댐삼거리		Hanam City	Cheonhyeon-dong	Prefectural Route 88 overlap
Baealmi Bridge	배알미대교		Hanam City	Cheonhyeon-dong	
South of Paldang Bridge IS	팔당대교남단 교차로	Misa-daero	Hanam City	Cheonhyeon-dong	
Paldang Bridge	팔당대교		Hanam City	Cheonhyeon-dong	
Paldang Bridge			Namyangju City	Wabu-eup	
Paldang Bridge IS	팔당대교 나들목	National Route 6 (Gyeonggang-ro); Paldang-ro	Namyangju City	Wabu-eup	National Route 6 overlap
Paldang 1 Tunnel	팔당1터널		Namyangju City	Wabu-eup	National Route 6 overlap Right tunnel: Approximately 229m Left tunnel: Approximately 260m
Paldang 2 Tunnel	팔당2터널		Namyangju City	Wabu-eup	National Route 6 overlap Right tunnel: Approximately 307m Left tunnel: Approximately 297m
Paldang 2 Tunnel			Namyangju City	Joan-myeon	National Route 6 overlap Right tunnel: Approximately 307m Left tunnel: Approximately 297m
Paldang 3 Tunnel	팔당3터널		Namyangju City	Joan-myeon	National Route 6 overlap Right tunnel: Approximately 169m Left tunnel: Approximately 235m
Paldang 4 Tunnel	팔당4터널		Namyangju City	Joan-myeon	National Route 6 overlap Right tunnel: Approximately 420m Left tunnel: Approximately 436m
Bongan Tunnel	봉안터널		Namyangju City	Joan-myeon	National Route 6 overlap Approximately 762m
Bongan Bridge	봉안대교		Namyangju City	Joan-myeon	National Route 6 overlap
Joan IC	조안 나들목	National Route 6 (Gyeonggang-ro); Bukhangang-ro	Namyangju City	Joan-myeon	National Route 6 overlap
Joan-myeon Office	조안면사무소		Namyangju City	Joan-myeon	
Joan Elementary School Entrance	조안초교입구	Bukhangang-ro 229beon-gil	Namyangju City	Joan-myeon	
Jinjung IS	진중삼거리	Yangsu-daero	Namyangju City	Joan-myeon	Connected with Prefectural Route 352
Ungilsan station	운길산역		Namyangju City	Joan-myeon	
Yeonse Middle School	연세중학교		Namyangju City	Joan-myeon	
Gubongma-eul	구봉마을앞	Jaejaegi-ro	Namyangju City	Joan-myeon	
Joan IC	조안 나들목	Capital Region 2nd Ring Expressway	Namyangju City	Joan-myeon	Expressway interchange under construction
Film Studio Entrance	영화촬영소입구	Bukhangang-ro 855beon-gil	Namyangju City	Joan-myeon	
Baekwol-ri Entrance	백월리입구	Bukhangang-ro 1115beon-gil	Namyangju City	Hwado-eup	
1st Geumnam Bridge	제1금남교	Prefectural Route 86 (Pokpo-ro); Prefectural Route 98	Namyangju City	Hwado-eup	Prefectural Route 98 overlap
Geumnam Elementary School Yangju CC Entrance	금남초등학교 양주CC입구		Namyangju City	Hwado-eup	Prefectural Route 98 overlap
Geumnam IS	금남 교차로	Bukhangang-ro	Namyangju City	Hwado-eup	Prefectural Route 98 overlap
Geumnam IC	금남 나들목	National Route 46 (Gyeongchunbuk-ro)	Namyangju City	Hwado-eup	National Route 46 overlap Prefectural Route 98 overlap
Saetteo IS	샛터 교차로	Gyeongchun-ro	Namyangju City	Hwado-eup	National Route 46 overlap Prefectural Route 98 overlap
Guun Bridge	구운교		Namyangju City	Hwado-eup	National Route 46 overlap Prefectural Route 98 overlap
Guun Bridge			Gapyeong County	Cheongpyeong-myeon	National Route 46 overlap Prefectural Route 98 overlap
Daeseong 3-ri IS	대성3리삼거리	Eunhaengnamu-gil	Gapyeong County	Cheongpyeong-myeon	National Route 46 overlap Prefectural Route 98 overlap
Daeseong Elementary School	대성초등학교		Gapyeong County	Cheongpyeong-myeon	National Route 46 overlap Prefectural Route 98 overlap
Daeseong-ri station (Daeseong-ri IS)	대성리역 (대성리 교차로)		Gapyeong County	Cheongpyeong-myeon	National Route 46 overlap Prefectural Route 98 overlap
Gwanteoma-eul Entrance	관터마을입구	Gwanteo-gil	Gapyeong County	Cheongpyeong-myeon	National Route 46 overlap Prefectural Route 98 overlap
Daeseong IS	대성 교차로	Prefectural Route 98 (Namga-ro)	Gapyeong County	Cheongpyeong-myeon	National Route 46 overlap Prefectural Route 98 overlap
Sincheongpyeong Bridge IS	신청평대교앞 교차로	National Route 37; Prefectural Route 391 (Yumyeong-ro)	Gapyeong County	Cheongpyeong-myeon	National Route 37, National Route 46 overlap Prefectural Route 391 overlap
Sodolma-eul IS	소돌마을앞 교차로	Sodolmal-gil	Gapyeong County	Cheongpyeong-myeon	National Route 37, National Route 46 overlap Prefectural Route 391 overlap
Sincheongpyeong 1 Bridge	신청평1교		Gapyeong County	Cheongpyeong-myeon	National Route 37, National Route 46 overlap Prefectural Route 391 overlap
Cheongpyeong Dam Entrance IS	청평댐입구삼거리	National Route 37; National Route 46 (Gyeongchun-ro); Prefectural Route 391 (Hoban-ro)	Gapyeong County	Cheongpyeong-myeon	Terminus; National Route 37, National Route 46 overlap Prefectural Route 391 overlap
