= National Route 21 (South Korea) =

Road in South Korea

National Route 21
- 국도 제21호선

Route information
- Length: 430.9 km (267.7 mi)
- Existed: 31 August 1971–present

Major junctions
- South end: Namwon, North Jeolla Province
- North end: Icheon, Gyeonggi Province

Location
- Country: South Korea

Highway system
- Highway systems of South Korea; Expressways; National; Local

National Route 21 is a national highway in South Korea connects Namwon to Icheon. It established on 31 August 1971.

== History ==
- August 31, 1971: Became National Route 21 Gunsan ~ Cheonan Line by the General National Highway Route Designation Decree.
- September 8, 1973: Due to alignment improvement, road zone changed from 956m section in Boryeong-ri, Jupo-myeon, Boryeong-gun to 610m, 600m section in Myeongcheon-ri, Daecheon-eup, Boryeong-gun to 736m, 650m section in Ogwan-ri, Hongseong-eup, Hongseong-gun to 480m, 300m section in Namjang-ri, Hongseong-eup, Hongseong-gun to 170m, 370m section in Sangjeong-ri ~ Baekgye-ri, Gwangcheon-eup, Hongseong-gun to 220m, 560m section in Yongam-ri, Gwangcheon-eup, Hongseong-gun to 500m
- August 8, 1975: Total 2.675km section from Okdong-ri, Nampo-myeon ~ Duryong-ri, Ungcheon-myeon, Boryeong-gun opened and existing 3.12km section abolished, 660m section from Gyejeong-ri ~ Jiseok-ri, Eungbong-myeon, Yesan-gun opened and existing 830m section abolished, total 2.675km section from Seongnae-ri, Biin-myeon ~ Hwasan-ri, Jongcheon-myeon, Seocheon-gun opened and existing 3.78km section abolished
- March 14, 1981: End point extended from 'Cheonan-si, Chungcheongnam-do' to 'Janghowon-eup, Icheon-gun, Gyeonggi-do'. Accordingly changed from 'Gunsan ~ Cheonan Line' to 'Gunsan ~ Janghowon Line'.
- April 16, 1981: Sinchang-dong, Janghang-eup, Seocheon-gun, Chungcheongnam-do ~ Wangjang-ri, Gamgok-myeon, Eumseong-gun, Chungcheongbuk-do 95.632km section upgraded to national highway opened
- May 30, 1981: Road zone changed to the extended 63km section according to the amendment of Presidential Decree No. 10247 General National Highway Route Designation Decree
- September 29, 1986: Existing designated Sindae-ri ~ Yeonchun-ri, Buk-myeon, Mokcheon-myeon, Cheonwon-gun 3.65km section, Nam-dong ~ Jangjae-ri, Baebang-myeon, Asan-gun, Onyang-si 3.52km section abolished
- January 31, 1987: Mojong-dong ~ Ssangyong-dong, Cheonan-si 11.34km section including Onyang Bypass Road (Mojong-dong ~ Gwongok-dong, Onyang-si) opened
- May 26, 1987: Existing designated Jusan Bridge (Yaryong-ri, Jusan-myeon, Boryeong-gun), Gwangcheon-eup area (Ongam-ri ~ Sinjin-ri, Gwangcheon-eup, Hongseong-gun), Yesan-eup area (Jugyo-ri ~ Sanseong-ri, Yesan-eup, Yesan-gun), Eumnae-ri, Sinchang-myeon, Asan-gun, Baebang-myeon area (Sindong-ri ~ Gongsu-ri, Baebang-myeon, Onyang-si) sections abolished
- July 21, 1987: Singye-ri ~ Yeonchun-ri, Buk-myeon, Mokcheon-myeon, Cheonwon-gun 2.88km section opened
- March 25, 1988: Maon-ri, Guhang-myeon, Hongseong-gun 280m section opened and existing 310m section abolished, Namjang-ri, Hongseong-eup, Hongseong-gun 160m section opened and existing 190m section abolished, Jungnim-ri ~ Jaejeong-ri, Cheongso-myeon, Boryeong-gun 270m section opened and existing 340m section abolished, Segyo-ri, Baebang-myeon, Asan-gun 150m section opened and existing 160m section abolished
- July 1, 1996: Starting point extended from 'Gunsan-si, Jeollabuk-do' to 'Jeonju-si, Jeollabuk-do'. Accordingly became 'Jeonju ~ Icheon Line'.
- December 20, 1997: Yongjeong-dong, Deokjin-gu, Jeonju-si ~ Naecho-dong, Gunsan-si 45.5km section designated as automobile-only road
- December 24, 1997: Daegyo-ri, Hongseong-eup, Hongseong-gun ~ Yeokap-ri, Osan-myeon, Yesan-gun 15.1km section newly opened, existing 17.2km section abolished
- January 8, 1998: Gwan-ri ~ Seongnae-ri, Biin-myeon, Seocheon-gun 3.24km section newly opened, existing 2.1km section abolished
- April 9, 1998: Ssangjeong-ri ~ Ingok-ri, Maengdong-myeon, Eumseong-gun 1.6km section opened, existing 1.65km section abolished
- September 24, 1998: Eumnae-ri, Sinchang-myeon ~ Nam-dong, Asan-si, Chungcheongnam-do 12.7km section designated as automobile-only road
- March 23, 2001: Road zone changed for Banwol-dong ~ Yongjeong-dong, Deokjin-gu, Jeonju-si 660m section due to Jeonju Interchange improvement project
- May 14, 2001: Hammok-ri, Deoksan-myeon, Jincheon-gun 880m section opened, existing 920m section abolished
- July 1, 2001: Naecho ~ Oksan Road (Gunjang Industrial Base Access Road, Naecho-dong ~ Dangbuk-ri, Oksan-myeon, Gunsan-si) 11.7km section expansion opening
- August 25, 2001: Starting point extended from 'Jeonju-si, Jeollabuk-do' to 'Daegang-myeon, Namwon-si, Jeollabuk-do'. Accordingly became 'Namwon ~ Icheon Line'.
- November 7, 2001: Daecheon-dong, Boryeong-si ~ Ongam-ri, Gwangcheon-eup, Hongseong-gun 15.45km section expansion opening, existing 16.2km section abolished
- December 27, 2001: Gwanchang-ri ~ Jugyo-ri, Jugyo-myeon, Boryeong-si 2.42km section expansion opening, existing 2.3km section abolished
- December 31, 2001: Oksan ~ Daeya Road (Gunjang Industrial Base Access Road, Dangbuk-ri, Oksan-myeon ~ Bokgyo-ri, Daeya-myeon, Gunsan-si, Unhoe-ri ~ Okseok-ri, Gaejeong-myeon, Gunsan-si) 9.8km section expansion opening. Daeya ~ Gongdeok, Seongdeok ~ Daeya Road 2km section simultaneously opened
- May 28, 2002: Daeya ~ Gongdeok ~ Jeonju Road (Jochon-dong, Deokjin-gu, Jeonju-si ~ Jigyeong-ri, Daeya-myeon, Gunsan-si) 25.9km section expansion opening
- December 9, 2002: Okdong-ri, Nampo-myeon ~ Gwanchang-ri, Jugyo-myeon, Boryeong-si 10.4km section designated as automobile-only road
- July 5, 2004: Sin-ri, Sanggwan-myeon, Wanju-gun ~ Wondang-dong, Wansan-gu, Jeonju-si 8.91km section designated as automobile-only road
- December 5, 2004: Gyoseong-ri ~ Sangsin-ri, Jincheon-eup, Jincheon-gun 41.km section expansion opening
- December 30, 2005: Guryong-dong ~ Songsan-dong, Jeongeup-si 3.2km section expansion opening
- December 31, 2005: Hwasan-dong ~ Gwanchang-ri, Jugyo-myeon, Boryeong-si 4.24km section expansion opening
- August 16, 2006: Asan-si National Highway Alternative Bypass Road (Haengmok-ri, Sinchang-myeon ~ Guryeong-ri, Baebang-myeon, Asan-si) 11.9km section expansion opening
- December 20, 2007: Deoksan ~ Yesan Road (Gwanjak-ri ~ Gungpyeong-ri, Yesan-eup, Yesan-gun) 3.6km section expansion opening
- December 31, 2007: Hwaseong-ri, Seongnam-myeon ~ Tapwon-ri, Byeongcheon-myeon, Cheonan-si 3.17km section expansion opening, existing Sangdong-ri, Buk-myeon ~ Tapwon-ri, Byeongcheon-myeon, Cheonan-si 4.02km section abolished
- July 14, 2008: Asan-si National Highway Alternative Bypass Road (Eumnae-ri ~ Haengmok-ri, Sinchang-myeon, Asan-si) 1.5km section expansion opening
- December 26, 2008: Gui ~ Yongjeong Road (Sin-ri, Sanggwan-myeon, Wanju-gun ~ Samcheon-dong 3-ga, Wansan-gu, Jeonju-si) 16.7km section opened
- December 31, 2008: Hongseong Southern Bypass Road (Maon-ri, Guhang-myeon ~ Jangseong-ri, Geumma-myeon, Hongseong-gun) 5.8km section newly opened, existing 6.4km section passing through Hongseong town center abolished
- December 22, 2009: Okdong-ri, Nampo-myeon ~ Hwasan-dong, Boryeong-si 7.09km section expansion opening, existing Okdong-ri, Nampo-myeon ~ Gwanchang-ri, Jugyo-myeon, Boryeong-si 10.2km section abolished
- November 22, 2010: Eumnae-ri, Sinchang-myeon, Asan-si 600m section expansion opening
- December 31, 2010: Due to Asan-si National Highway Alternative Bypass Road opening, existing Eumnae-ri, Sinchang-myeon ~ Guryeong-ri, Baebang-eup, Asan-si 11.5km section abolished
- March 28, 2011: Yongjeong-dong, Deokjin-gu, Jeonju-si ~ Yongheung-ri, Yongjin-myeon, Wanju-gun 11.23km section designated as automobile-only road
- November 28, 2012: Jincheon IC ~ Geumwang Road Section 1 (Sangsin-ri, Jincheon-eup, Jincheon-gun ~ Masan-ri, Maengdong-myeon, Eumseong-gun) 11.02km section expansion opening, existing Sangsin-ri, Jincheon-eup, Jincheon-gun ~ Bonseong-ri, Maengdong-myeon, Eumseong-gun 9.6km section abolished
- December 28, 2012: Jincheon IC ~ Geumwang Road Section 2 (Masan-ri, Maengdong-myeon ~ Gakhoe-ri, Geumwang-eup, Eumseong-gun) 9.9km section expansion opening, existing Bonseong-ri, Maengdong-myeon ~ Byeongam-ri, Saenggeuk-myeon, Eumseong-gun 11.762km section abolished
- December 19, 2013: Guryeong-ri, Baebang-eup, Asan-si ~ Sinbang-dong, Dongnam-gu, Cheonan-si 7.0km section expansion opening, existing Gongsu-ri ~ Buksu-ri, Baebang-eup, Asan-si 1.5km section abolished
- February 13, 2015: Yongjeong Intersection ~ Banwol Intersection among Yongjeong ~ Yongjin Road (Yongjeong-dong ~ Goryang-dong, Deokjin-gu, Jeonju-si) 3.2km section expansion opening
- December 28, 2015: Naewol-ri, Jeokseong-myeon ~ Gumi-ri, Donggye-myeon, Sunchang-gun 2.7km section expansion opening, existing 2.0km section abolished
- October 28, 2016: Banwol Intersection ~ Yongjin Intersection among Yongjeong ~ Yongjin Road (Goryang-dong, Deokjin-gu, Jeonju-si ~ Yongheung-ri, Yongjin-eup, Wanju-gun) 8.0km section expansion opening
- October 28, 2016: Banwol Intersection ~ Yongjin Intersection among Yongjeong ~ Yongjin Road (Goryang-dong, Deokjin-gu, Jeonju-si ~ Yongheung-ri, Yongjin-eup, Wanju-gun) 8.0km section opening postponed to November
- November 10, 2016: Banwol Intersection ~ Yongjin Intersection among Yongjeong ~ Yongjin Road (Goryang-dong, Deokjin-gu, Jeonju-si ~ Yongheung-ri, Yongjin-eup, Wanju-gun) 8.0km section expansion opening
- December 30, 2016: Expanded and opened a 3.91 km section of the Yongdu–Dongmyeon road (Tapwon-ri, Byeongcheon-myeon, Dongnam-gu, Cheonan-si ~ Hwage-ri, Dong-myeon), closing the existing 3.63 km section.
- December 31, 2017: Expanded and opened Section 1 of the Seocheon–Boryeong road (Oseok-ri, Seocheon-eup, Seocheon-gun ~ Singu-ri, Jusang-myeon, Boryeong-si), 15.1 km, and closed the existing 6.223 km section. Also expanded and opened Section 3 of the Seocheon–Boryeong road (Duryong-ri, Ungcheon-eup, Boryeong-si ~ Okdong-ri, Nampo-myeon), 13.14 km, closing the previous section (Duryong-ri, Ungcheon-eup ~ Eumnae-ri, Nampo-myeon) totaling 5.01 km.
- December 26, 2018: Expanded and opened the Jeongeup Bujeon–Sunchang Ssangchi road (Shinseong-ri, Ssangchi-myeon, Sunchang-gun ~ Bujeon-dong, Jeongeup-si), 7.36 km, and closed a total of 7.47 km: Jonggok-ri ~ Bangsan-ri section (1.95 km) in Ssangchi-myeon, Sunchang-gun, and 5.52 km in Bujeon-dong, Jeongeup-si.
- December 31, 2019: Expanded and opened the Sunchang Ssangchi-jinae road (Geumpyung-ri ~ Shinseong-ri, Ssangchi-myeon, Sunchang-gun), 6.44 km, and closed the previous 760 m section (Geumpyung-ri ~ Oksan-ri, Ssangchi-myeon).
- December 30, 2020: Expanded and opened the Sunchang Donggye–Jeokseong road (Gumi-ri ~ Gwanjeon-ri, Donggye-myeon, Sunchang-gun), 3.98 km.

== Main stopovers ==
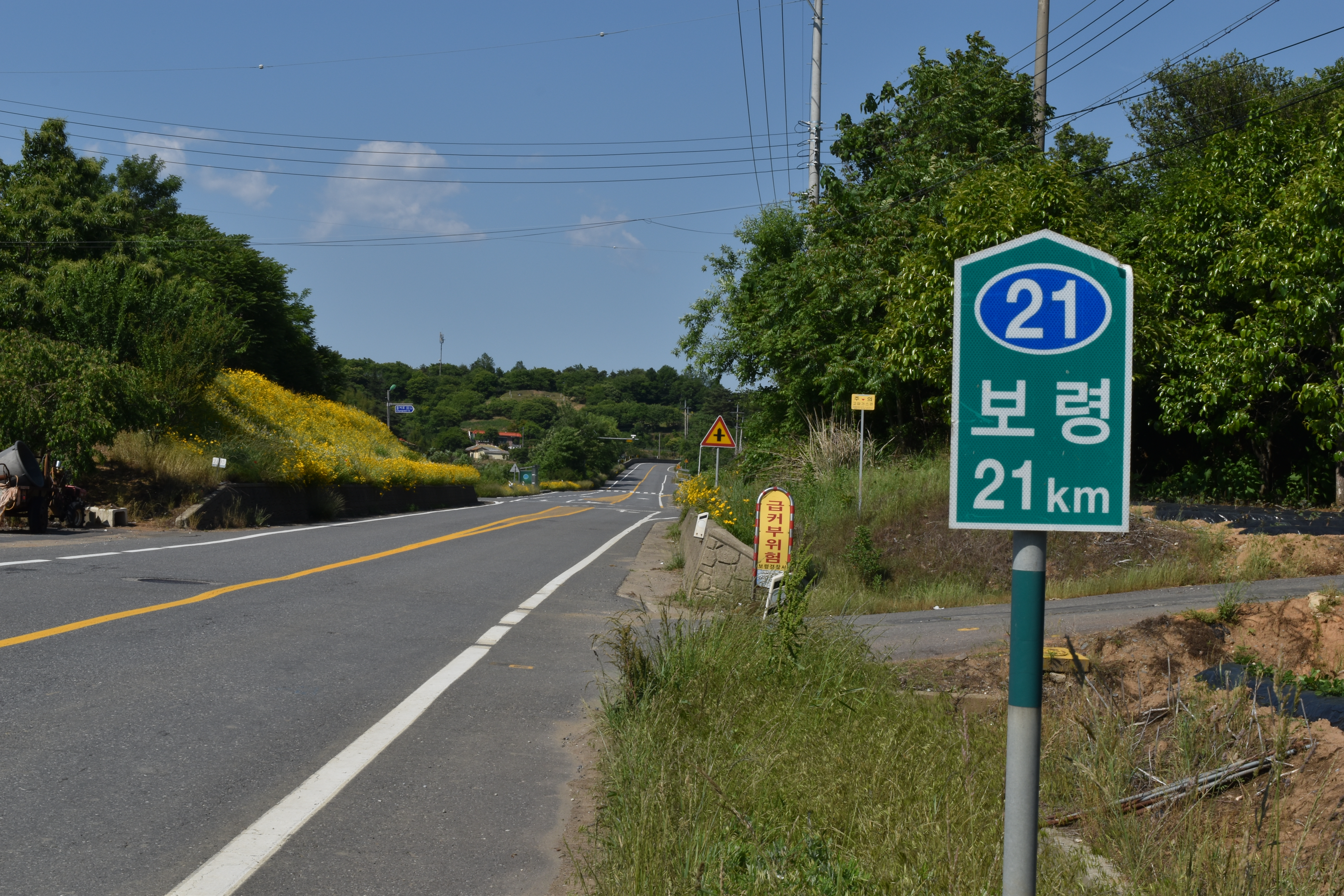
National Route 21 in Boryeong

North Jeolla Province

- Namwon - Sunchang County - Jeongeup - Gimje - Jeonju - Wanju County - Jeonju - Iksan - Gimje - Iksan - Gunsan

South Chungcheong Province

- Seocheon County - Boryeong - Hongseong County - Yesan County - Asan - Cheonan

North Chungcheong Province

- Jincheon County - Eumseong County

Gyeonggi Province

- Icheon

== Major intersections ==
- (■): Motorway

IS: Intersection, IC: Interchange

=== North Jeolla Province ===
Name	Hangul name	Connection	Location		Note
Daegang-myeon Office	대강면사무소		Namwon City	Daegang-myeon	Terminus; National Route 13 overlap
No name	(이름 없음)	Prefectural Route 745 (Geumtan-ro)	Namwon City	Daegang-myeon	National Route 13 overlap
Pyeongchon IS	평촌삼거리	Prefectural Route 730 (Yudeung-ro)	Namwon City	Daegang-myeon	National Route 13 overlap
Suhong IS	수홍삼거리	National Route 24 (Bihong-ro)	Namwon City	Daegang-myeon	National Route 13, National Route 24 overlap
Goejeong IS	괴정삼거리	National Route 24 (Damsun-ro)	Sunchang County	Jeokseong-myeon	National Route 13, National Route 24 overlap
Seoho Bridge (Seohyo Bridge)	서호다리(서효교)		Sunchang County	Jeokseong-myeon	National Route 13 overlap
Hyeonpo IS	현포삼거리	Donggye-ro	Sunchang County	Donggye-myeon	National Route 13 overlap
Yeonsan IS	연산사거리	National Route 13 (Chunghyo-ro); Donggye 1-gil	Sunchang County	Donggye-myeon	National Route 13 overlap Prefectural Route 717 overlap
Donggye High School	동계고등학교		Sunchang County	Donggye-myeon	Prefectural Route 717 overlap
Gwanjeon IS	관전삼거리	Prefectural Route 717 (Gangdong-ro)	Sunchang County	Donggye-myeon	Prefectural Route 717 overlap
No name	(이름 없음)	Ganggyeong-gil	Sunchang County	Jeokseong-myeon	
Naewol IS	내월삼거리	Jeokseong-ro	Sunchang County	Jeokseong-myeon	
Unrim IS	운림삼거리	Inseong-ro	Sunchang County	Jeokseong-myeon	
No name	(이름 없음)	Sesim-ro	Sunchang County	Ingye-myeon	
No name	(이름 없음)	Injung-ro	Sunchang County	Ingye-myeon	
Ingye Elementary School	인계초등학교		Sunchang County	Ingye-myeon	
No name No name	(이름 없음) (이름 없음)	Hogye-gil; Seonam-ro	Sunchang County	Ingye-myeon	
Ingye IS	인계교차로	National Route 27 (Moak-ro)	Sunchang County	Ingye-myeon	
Ingye IS (Ingye-myeon Office)	인계삼거리 (인계면사무소)	Indeok-ro	Sunchang County	Ingye-myeon	
No name	(이름 없음)	Indeok-ro	Sunchang County	Ingye-myeon	
No name No name	(이름 없음) (이름 없음)	Gusan-ro; Hoeryong-gil	Sunchang County	Gurim-myeon	
Dungi IS	둔기삼거리	Prefectural Route 729 (Gwangam-ro)	Sunchang County	Gurim-myeon	Prefectural Route 729 overlap
No name	(이름 없음)	Seonggok-ro	Sunchang County	Gurim-myeon	Prefectural Route 729 overlap
Gurim Bridge IS	구림교삼거리	Prefectural Route 729 (Yeonsan 2-gil)	Sunchang County	Gurim-myeon	Prefectural Route 729 overlap
Gurim IS	구림삼거리	Gurim-ro	Sunchang County	Gurim-myeon	
Woljeong IS	월정삼거리	Prefectural Route 55; Prefectural Route 792 (Gangcheon-ro)	Sunchang County	Gurim-myeon	Prefectural Route 55, 792 overlap
Ojeongja IS	오정자삼거리	Prefectural Route 792 (Gangcheon-ro)	Sunchang County	Gurim-myeon	Prefectural Route 55, 792 overlap
Unbuk IS	운북삼거리	Jangam-gil	Sunchang County	Gurim-myeon	Prefectural Route 55 overlap
No name	(이름 없음)	Unhang-gil	Sunchang County	Gurim-myeon	Prefectural Route 55 overlap
Bamjae	밤재		Sunchang County	Gurim-myeon	Prefectural Route 55 overlap
Bamjae			Sunchang County	Ssangchi-myeon	Prefectural Route 55 overlap
Ssangchi IS	쌍치사거리	Prefectural Route 55; Prefectural Route 715 (Cheongjeong-ro); Ssanggye-ro	Sunchang County	Ssangchi-myeon	Prefectural Route 55 overlap
Ssangchi Middle School	쌍치중학교		Sunchang County	Ssangchi-myeon	
Ssanggalmae IS	쌍갈매삼거리	National Route 29 (Sunjeong-ro)	Sunchang County	Ssangchi-myeon	National Route 29 overlap
Oksan IS	옥산삼거리	Guksabong-ro	Sunchang County	Ssangchi-myeon	National Route 29 overlap
Hunmonhjae Entrance	훈몽재입구		Sunchang County	Ssangchi-myeon	National Route 29 overlap
Sinseong IS	신성교차로	Prefectural Route 49 (Baekbang-ro)	Sunchang County	Ssangchi-myeon	National Route 29 overlap Prefectural Route 49 overlap
Gaeunchi	개운치		Jeongeup City	Naejangsang-dong	National Route 29 overlap Prefectural Route 49 overlap
Bujeonjae IS	부전제삼거리	Prefectural Route 49 (Chilbosan-ro)	Jeongeup City	Naejangsang-dong	National Route 29 overlap Prefectural Route 49 overlap
Bujeon IS	부전사거리	Naejangsan-ro	Jeongeup City	Naejangsang-dong	National Route 29 overlap
Naejangsang-dong Community Center	내장상동주민센터		Jeongeup City	Naejangsang-dong	National Route 29 overlap
Songsan IS	송산교차로	National Route 1 (Jeongeup-daero); National Route 29 (Naejangsan-ro)	Jeongeup City	Naejangsang-dong	National Route 1 overlap National Route 29 overlap
Yongho Tunnel	용호터널		Jeongeup City	Jangmyeong-dong	National Route 1 overlap Right tunnel: Approximately 285m Left tunnel: Approximately 250m
Yongho IS	용호교차로	Prefectural Route 708 (Jeongeupbuk-ro)	Jeongeup City	Jangmyeong-dong	National Route 1 overlap Prefectural Route 708 overlap
Bakdong IS	박동교차로	Seobusaneopdo-ro	Jeongeup City	Buk-myeon	National Route 1 overlap Prefectural Route 708 overlap
Jeongeup Bridge	정읍대교		Jeongeup City	Buk-myeon	National Route 1 overlap Prefectural Route 708 overlap
Hwahae IS	화해교차로	Prefectural Route 708 (Chilbuk-ro)	Jeongeup City	Buk-myeon	National Route 1 overlap Prefectural Route 708 overlap
Usan IS	우산교차로	Jeongeupbuk-ro	Jeongeup City	Jeongu-myeon	National Route 1 overlap
Jigyeong IS	지경교차로	Taego-ro	Jeongeup City	Jeongu-myeon	National Route 1 overlap
Taein IS	태인교차로	Seokji-ro	Jeongeup City	Taein-myeon	National Route 1 overlap Connected with Taein IC
Wangnim IS	왕림교차로	National Route 30	Jeongeup City	Taein-myeon	National Route 1 overlap
Oseong IS	오성교차로	Jeongeupbuk-ro	Jeongeup City	Taein-myeon	National Route 1 overlap
Nokdong IS	녹동교차로	Jeongeupbuk-ro	Jeongeup City	Ongdong-myeon	National Route 1 overlap
Yongho IS	용호교차로	Jeongeupbuk-ro	Jeongeup City	Ongdong-myeon	National Route 1 overlap
Solteun Tunnel	솔튼터널		Jeongeup City	Ongdong-myeon	National Route 1 overlap Right tunnel: Approximately 780m Left tunnel: Approximately 700m
Tongseok IS	통석교차로	Geumpyeong-ro; Jeongeupbuk-ro	Jeongeup City	Gamgok-myeon	National Route 1 overlap
Wonpyeong IS	원평 교차로	Prefectural Route 714; Prefectural Route 736 (Bonghwang-ro)	Gimje City	Geumsan-myeon	National Route 1 overlap
Naksu IS	낙수교차로	Prefectural Route 712 (Bongnam-ro) (Wonpyeong-ro)	Gimje City	Geumsan-myeon	National Route 1 overlap
Bongeun IS	봉은교차로	Guseong-gil	Gimje City	Geumsan-myeon	National Route 1 overlap
Yongbok IS	용복교차로	Yangsi-ro	Gimje City	Geumgu-myeon	National Route 1 overlap
Geumgu IS	금구사거리	Daesong-ro	Gimje City	Geumgu-myeon	National Route 1 overlap
Geumgu IC	금구 나들목	Prefectural Route 714 (Pungyo-ro)	Gimje City	Geumgu-myeon	National Route 1 overlap Connected with Gimje IC
Woljeon IS	월전삼거리	Bongdu-ro	Gimje City	Geumgu-myeon	National Route 1 overlap
Daeya IS	대야삼거리	Prefectural Route 713 (Iseonam-ro)	Gimje City	Geumgu-myeon	National Route 1 overlap
Ssuk Pass IS	쑥고개 교차로	National Route 1 National Route 27 (Honam-ro); Ssukgogae-ro	Jeonju City	Wansan District	National Route 1 overlap National Route 27 overlap
Jungin IS	중인 교차로	Prefectural Route 712 (Urim-ro)	Jeonju City	Wansan District	National Route 27 overlap
Gui IS	구이 교차로	National Route 27 (Moak-ro)	Jeonju City	Wansan District	National Route 27 overlap
Taebong IS	태봉 교차로	Pyeongchon-ro	Wanju County	Gui-myeon	
Gwanggok Tunnel	광곡터널		Wanju County	Gui-myeon	Approximately 380m
Godeok Tunnel	고덕터널		Wanju County	Gui-myeon	Right tunnel: Approximately 920m Left tunnel: Approximately 870m
Sanggwan IS	상관 교차로	National Route 17 (Chunhyang-ro)	Wanju County	Sanggwan-myeon	National Route 17 overlap
No name	(이름 없음)	Sinri-ro	Wanju County	Sanggwan-myeon	National Route 17 overlap
No name	(이름 없음)	Chunhyang-ro	Wanju County	Sanggwan-myeon	National Route 17 overlap
Ajung Station Square	아중역광장	Ajung-ro	Jeonju City	Deokjin District	National Route 17 overlap
Andeokwon IS (Andeokwon Underpass)	안덕원사거리 (안덕원지하차도)	National Route 26 (Andeokwon-ro)	Jeonju City	Deokjin District	National Route 17, National Route 26 overlap
Station Square (Jeonju Station)	역전광장 (전주역)	Baekje-daero	Jeonju City	Deokjin District	National Route 17, National Route 26 overlap
Hoseong-dong Community Center	호성동주민센터		Jeonju City	Deokjin District	National Route 17, National Route 26 overlap
Vehicle Registration Office	차량등록사업소앞	National Route 17 (Wanju-ro)	Jeonju City	Deokjin District	National Route 17, National Route 26 overlap
Songcheon Station IS	송천역네거리	Songcheonjungang-ro	Jeonju City	Deokjin District	National Route 26 overlap
Jeonju City Agricultural and Marine Products Market	전주시농수산물시장		Jeonju City	Deokjin District	National Route 26 overlap
Baldan-ri IS	발단리네거리	Sicheon-ro; Jeonmi-ro	Jeonju City	Deokjin District	National Route 26 overlap
Jeonjucheon Bridge	전주천교		Jeonju City	Deokjin District	National Route 26 overlap
Dongsan Station IS	동산역네거리	Pyeonun-ro	Jeonju City	Deokjin District	National Route 26 overlap
Dongsan Square IS	동산광장교차로	Banwol-ro; Samnye-ro; Hyeoksin-ro	Jeonju City	Deokjin District	National Route 26 overlap
Jeonju IC (Banwol IS)	전주 나들목 (반월교차로)	Honam Expressway	Jeonju City	Deokjin District	National Route 26 overlap
Jochon IS	조촌교차로	Girin-daero; Ongoeul-ro; Jjokgureum-ro	Jeonju City	Deokjin District	National Route 26 overlap
Daeheung IS	대흥 교차로	National Route 1 National Route 27 (Honam-ro); National Route 26 (Beonyeong-ro)	Jeonju City	Deokjin District	National Route 26 overlap
Dodo IS	도도 교차로	Saemangeumbuk-ro	Jeonju City	Deokjin District	
Hakdong IS	학동 교차로	National Route 26 (Beonyeong-ro)	Gimje City	Baekgu-myeon	
Gongdeok IS	공덕 교차로	National Route 23 (Hagong-ro)	Gimje City	Gongdeok-myeon	
Gongdeok Bridge	공덕대교		Gimje City	Gongdeok-myeon	
East Gunsan IC (Daeya IS)	동군산 나들목 (대야교차로)	Seohaean Expressway; National Route 29 (Geumman-ro)	Gunsan City	Daeya-myeon	National Route 29 overlap
Gaejeong IS	개정 교차로	National Route 29 (Geumgang-ro)	Gunsan City	Gaejeong-myeon	National Route 29 overlap
Oksan IS	옥산 교차로	Prefectural Route 709 (Oksan-ro)	Gunsan City	Oksan-myeon	
Dangbuk IS	당북 교차로	Wolmyeong-ro	Gunsan City	Oksan-myeon	
Kunsan National University IS	군산대 교차로	Daehak-ro	Gunsan City	Naun-dong	
Airport IS	공항 교차로	National Route 26 (Gonghang-ro)	Gunsan City	Miseong-dong	
Oknyeo IS	옥녀 교차로	Oknyeo-ro	Gunsan City	Miseong-dong	
Maeripjang IS	매립장삼거리		Gunsan City	Miseong-dong	
Naecho IS	내초사거리	Naecho-ro	Gunsan City	Miseong-dong	
Expo IS	엑스포사거리	National Route 4 National Route 77 (Saemangeumbuk-ro)	Gunsan City	Miseong-dong	National Route 4, National Route 77 overlap
Electrical Substation IS	변전소사거리	Dongjangsan-ro; Oehang-ro	Gunsan City	Soryong-dong	National Route 4, National Route 77 overlap
Daeu IS	대우삼거리	Jangsan-ro	Gunsan City	Soryong-dong	National Route 4, National Route 77 overlap
Passenger Terminal IS	여객터미널삼거리	Imhae-ro	Gunsan City	Soryong-dong	National Route 4, National Route 77 overlap
Gongdan IS	공단삼거리	Gongdandae-ro	Gunsan City	Soryong-dong	National Route 4, National Route 77 overlap
Oego IS	외고삼거리	National Route 26 (Gonghang-ro)	Gunsan City	Soryong-dong	National Route 4, National Route 26, National Route 77 overlap
Wolmyeong Tunnel IS	월명터널삼거리	Wolmyeong-ro	Gunsan City	Haesin-dong	National Route 4, National Route 26, National Route 77 overlap
Doseonjang IS	도선장사거리	Gunsanchang-gil	Gunsan City	Wolmyeong-dong	National Route 26 overlap
Naehang IS	내항사거리	National Route 26; National Route 27 (Daehak-ro)	Gunsan City	Wolmyeong-dong	National Route 26, National Route 27 overlap
Gyeonguhoeap	경우회앞	Jukseong-ro	Gunsan City	Jungang-dong	National Route 27 overlap
Gyeongam IS	경암사거리	National Route 26 (Haemang-ro)	Gunsan City	Gyeongam-dong	National Route 27 overlap
Jinpo IS	진포사거리	Jinpo-ro	Gunsan City	Gyeongam-dong	National Route 27 overlap
Yeonan IS	연안사거리	Jochon-ro	Gunsan City	Gyeongam-dong	National Route 27 overlap
Guam Bridge IS	구암교삼거리	Guam 3.1-ro	Gunsan City	Guam-dong	National Route 27 overlap
Jamdu IS	잠두삼거리	Baekreung-ro	Gunsan City	Guam-dong	National Route 27 overlap
Guam IS	구암삼거리	Guam 3.1-ro	Gunsan City	Guam-dong	National Route 27 overlap
Hodeok IS	호덕교차로	National Route 27 (Guam-ro); National Route 29 (Geumgang-ro)	Gunsan City	Gaejeong-myeon	National Route 27 overlap National Route 29 overlap
Gunsan Station IS	군산역교차로	Anjeong-gil; Haeryeong 1-gil	Gunsan City	Guam-dong	National Route 29 overlap Continuation into South Chungcheong Province
Haguduk IS (Seongsan Overpass)	하구둑사거리 (성산육교)	Prefectural Route 709 (Cheolsae-ro); Gangbyeon-ro	Gunsan City	Seongsan-myeon	National Route 29 overlap Continuation into South Chungcheong Province
Geumgang Riverwall	금강하구둑		Gunsan City	Seongsan-myeon	National Route 29 overlap Continuation into South Chungcheong Province

=== South Chungcheong Province ===
Name	Hangul name	Connection	Location		Note
Geumgang Riverwall	금강하구둑		Seocheon County	Maseo-myeon	National Route 29 overlap North Jeolla Province - South Chungcheong Province border line
Haguduk IS	하구둑사거리	National Route 29; Prefectural Route 68 (Jangsan-ro)	Seocheon County	Maseo-myeon	National Route 29 overlap North Jeolla Province - South Chungcheong Province border line
Songnae IS	송내 교차로	National Route 4 National Route 77 (Daebaekje-ro)	Seocheon County	Maseo-myeon	National Route 4, National Route 77 overlap
Janghang Station IS	장항역사거리	Janghang Station-gil; Janghangsandan-ro	Seocheon County	Maseo-myeon	National Route 4, National Route 77 overlap
Deokam IS	덕암교차로	Okdo-ro	Seocheon County	Maseo-myeon	National Route 4, National Route 77 overlap
Samsan IS	삼산교차로	Samsan-gil	Seocheon County	Seocheon-eup	National Route 4, National Route 77 overlap
Gunsa 2 IS	군사2교차로	Jangseo-ro	Seocheon County	Seocheon-eup	National Route 4, National Route 77 overlap
Gunsa IS	군사교차로	Chungjeol-ro	Seocheon County	Seocheon-eup	National Route 4, National Route 77 overlap
No name	(이름 없음)	Sagok-ro	Seocheon County	Seocheon-eup	National Route 4, National Route 77 overlap
Oseok IS	오석사거리	National Route 4 (Daebaekje-ro)	Seocheon County	Seocheon-eup	National Route 4, National Route 77 overlap
Dangjeong IS	당정사거리	Prefectural Route 617 (Jangcheol-ro); Chungseo-ro 302beon-gil	Seocheon County	Jongcheon-myeon	National Route 77 overlap Prefectural Route 617 overlap
Jongcheon IS	종천삼거리	Prefectural Route 617 (Jongpan-ro)	Seocheon County	Jongcheon-myeon	National Route 77 overlap Prefectural Route 617 overlap
Gwanri IS	관리삼거리	Biin-ro	Seocheon County	Biin-myeon	National Route 77 overlap
No name	(이름 없음)	Seondo-gil	Seocheon County	Biin-myeon	National Route 77 overlap
Seongnae IS	성내사거리	Prefectural Route 607 (Seoin-ro); Biin-ro	Seocheon County	Biin-myeon	National Route 77 overlap
Chunjangdae IC	춘장대 나들목	Seohaean Expressway	Seocheon County	Biin-myeon	National Route 77 overlap
Singu IS	신구삼거리	Singuyugok-ro	Seocheon County	Biin-myeon	National Route 77 overlap
Yaryong IS	야룡삼거리	Manseundong-gil	Boryeong City	Jusan-myeon	National Route 77 overlap
Jusan-myeon Office	주산면사무소		Boryeong City	Jusan-myeon	National Route 77 overlap
Geumam IS Jusan Elementary School	금암삼거리 주산초등학교	Jusanbeotkkot-ro	Boryeong City	Jusan-myeon	National Route 77 overlap
Industrial Complex IS	산업단지교차로	Boryeongjusan Industrial Complex	Boryeong City	Jusan-myeon	National Route 77 overlap
Daechang IS	대창사거리	Doksan-ro; Jangteo 6-gil	Boryeong City	Ungcheon-eup	National Route 77 overlap
Daechang Bridge	대창교		Boryeong City	Ungcheon-eup	National Route 77 overlap
Ungcheon Bridge IS	웅천교삼거리	Jangteojungang-gil	Boryeong City	Ungcheon-eup	National Route 77 overlap
Daecheon-ri IS	대천리삼거리	Prefectural Route 606 (Mansu-ro)	Boryeong City	Ungcheon-eup	National Route 77 overlap Prefectural Route 606 overlap
Muchangpo IS	무창포삼거리	Prefectural Route 606 (Muchangpo-ro)	Boryeong City	Ungcheon-eup	National Route 77 overlap Prefectural Route 606 overlap
Eupnae IS	읍내삼거리	Woljeon-ro	Boryeong City	Nampo-myeon	National Route 77 overlap
Nampo IS	남포삼거리	Boryeongnam-ro	Boryeong City	Nampo-myeon	National Route 77 overlap
Nampo IS	남포 교차로	(Connection road are under construction)	Boryeong City	Nampo-myeon	National Route 77 overlap
Myeongcheon IS	명천 교차로	National Route 40 (Seongjusan-ro)	Boryeong City	Daecheon-dong	National Route 40, National Route 77 overlap
Hwasan IS	화산 교차로	National Route 36; National Route 77 (Daecheon-ro)	Boryeong City	Daecheon-dong	National Route 40, National Route 77 overlap
Bonghwang Tunnel	봉황터널		Boryeong City	Daecheon-dong	National Route 40 overlap Approximately 1120m
Gwanchang IS	관창 교차로	Boryeongbuk-ro	Boryeong City	Jugyo-myeon	National Route 40 overlap
Jugyo IS	주교사거리	Prefectural Route 610 (Ulgyekeun-gil)	Boryeong City	Jupo-myeon	National Route 40 overlap Prefectural Route 610 overlap
Chungseo-ro IS	충서로사거리	Chungseo-ro	Boryeong City	Jupo-myeon	National Route 40 overlap Prefectural Route 610 overlap
Gwansan IS	관산사거리	Jupoyeok-gil	Boryeong City	Jupo-myeon	National Route 40 overlap Prefectural Route 610 overlap
Bongdang IS	봉당삼거리	Wondang-gil	Boryeong City	Jupo-myeon	National Route 40 overlap Prefectural Route 610 overlap
Jupo IS	주포사거리	National Route 40 (Chungcheongsuyeong-ro); Boryeongeupseong-gil	Boryeong City	Jupo-myeon	National Route 40 overlap Prefectural Route 610 overlap
Magang IS	마강삼거리	Bakgangsul-gil	Boryeong City	Jupo-myeon	Prefectural Route 610 overlap
Tongnam IS	통남삼거리	Yahyeonjeongjeon-gil	Boryeong City	Cheongso-myeon	Prefectural Route 610 overlap
Cheongso IS	청소교차로	Prefectural Route 610 (Cheongsokeun-gil)	Boryeong City	Cheongso-myeon	Prefectural Route 610 overlap
Jinjuk IS	진죽사거리	Cheongsokeun-gil	Boryeong City	Cheongso-myeon	
Jaecheong IS	재정삼거리	Gimjwajin-ro	Boryeong City	Cheongso-myeon	
Madong IS	마동삼거리	Madong 3-gil	Boryeong City	Cheongso-myeon	
Jukrim IS	죽림교차로	Gwangcheon-ro	Boryeong City	Cheongso-myeon	
Yongam IS	옹암교차로	Gwangcheon-ro	Hongseong County	Gwangcheon-eup	
Danarae IS	단아래사거리	Prefectural Route 96 (Hongnam-ro)	Hongseong County	Gwangcheon-eup	
Sinjin IS	신진삼거리	Gwangcheon-ro	Hongseong County	Gwangcheon-eup	
Hongju Passenger Corp.	홍주여객		Hongseong County	Gwangcheon-eup	
Jijeong IS	지정삼거리	Geobuk-ro	Hongseong County	Guhang-myeon	
Industrial Complex IS	산업단지삼거리	Chungseo-ro966beon-gil	Hongseong County	Guhang-myeon	
Maon IS	마온교차로	National Route 29 (Nambusunhwan-ro); Chungseo-ro	Hongseong County	Hongseong-eup	National Route 29 overlap
Hakgye IS	학계교차로	Daehak-gil	Hongseong County	Hongseong-eup	National Route 29 overlap
Yeongam IS	영암교차로	Prefectural Route 609 (Hongjangbuk-ro)	Hongseong County	Hongseong-eup	National Route 29 overlap
Goam IS	고암교차로	National Route 29 (Chungjeol-ro)	Hongseong County	Hongseong-eup	National Route 29 overlap
Jangseong IS	장성교차로	Chungseo-ro	Hongseong County	Geumma-myeon	
Singok IS	신곡사거리	Chungseo-ro910beon-gil	Hongseong County	Geumma-myeon	
Baeyang IS	배양삼거리	Prefectural Route 616 (Geumma-ro)	Hongseong County	Geumma-myeon	
Hwayang IS	화양삼거리	Geumbuk-ro	Hongseong County	Geumma-myeon	
Bupyeong IS	부평사거리	Gwanggeumbuk-ro	Hongseong County	Geumma-myeon	
Daegyo IS	대교교차로	Bongsusan-ro	Hongseong County	Geumma-myeon	
No name	(이름 없음)	Maejukheon-gil	Hongseong County	Hongbuk-myeon	
No name	(이름 없음)	Eungbong-ro	Yesan County	Eungbong-myeon	
Eungbong IS	응봉사거리	Prefectural Route 619 (Yedang-ro)	Yesan County	Eungbong-myeon	
(No name IS)	(교차로 이름 미상)	Prefectural Route 602 (Chungnam-daero)	Yesan County	Eungbong-myeon	
Yesan-Sudeoksa IC	예산수덕사 나들목	Dangjin-Yeongdeok Expressway	Yesan County	Oga-myeon	
Driver's License Examination Office IS	면허시험장사거리	Guksabong-ro; Osin-ro	Yesan County	Oga-myeon	
Oga IS	오가사거리	Sinjangwonpyeong-gil; Ogajungang-ro	Yesan County	Oga-myeon	
Yesan Bridge	예산대교		Yesan County	Yesan-eup	
Muhan IS	무한교차로	National Route 32; Prefectural Route 70; Prefectural Route 618 (Chadong-ro); Yesan-ro	Yesan County	Yesan-eup	National Route 32 overlap Prefectural Route 70, 618 overlap
Yesan Underpass	예산지하차도	Geumo-daero	Yesan County	Yesan-eup	National Route 32 overlap Prefectural Route 70, 618 overlap
Balyeon IS	발연 교차로	Prefectural Route 618 (Hwanggeumtteul-ro)	Yesan County	Yesan-eup	National Route 32 overlap Prefectural Route 70, 618 overlap
Seokyang IS	석양교차로	National Route 45; Prefectural Route 70 (Yunbonggil-ro)	Yesan County	Yesan-eup	National Route 32, National Route 45 overlap Prefectural Route 70 overlap
Gwanjak IS	관작삼거리	Sillyewon-ro	Yesan County	Yesan-eup	National Route 32, National Route 45 overlap
Changso IS	창소사거리	Changmal-ro; Chusa-ro	Yesan County	Yesan-eup	National Route 32, National Route 45 overlap
Jeomchon IS	점촌삼거리	Sillyewon-ro	Yesan County	Yesan-eup	National Route 32, National Route 45 overlap
Ganyang IS	간양교차로	National Route 32 (Yedangpyeongya-ro)	Yesan County	Yesan-eup	National Route 32, National Route 45 overlap
Geumsan-ri IS	금산리교차로	Prefectural Route 645 (Asanman-ro)	Asan City	Dogo-myeon	National Route 45 overlap Prefectural Route 645 overlap
Geumsan IS	금산삼거리	Oncheon-daero207beon-gil	Asan City	Dogo-myeon	National Route 45 overlap Prefectural Route 645 overlap
Sijeon IS	시전사거리	Prefectural Route 645 (Dogosan-ro)	Asan City	Dogo-myeon	National Route 45 overlap Prefectural Route 645 overlap
Dogooncheon Station	도고온천역		Asan City	Dogo-myeon	National Route 45 overlap
Hyangsan IS	향산사거리	Sintong-gil	Asan City	Dogo-myeon	National Route 45 overlap
Soonchunhyang University	순천향대학교		Asan City	Sinchang-myeon	National Route 45 overlap
Soonchunhyang University IS	순천향대삼거리	Prefectural Route 623 (Suncheonhyang-ro)	Asan City	Sinchang-myeon	National Route 45 overlap Prefectural Route 623 overlap
Eupnae IS	읍내삼거리	Prefectural Route 623 (Seobunam-ro)	Asan City	Sinchang-myeon	National Route 45 overlap Prefectural Route 623 overlap
Eupnae IS	읍내 교차로	National Route 39 (Onyangsunhwan-ro); National Route 45 (Oncheon-daero)	Asan City	Sinchang-myeon	National Route 39 overlap National Route 45 overlap
Haengmok IS	행목 교차로	Prefectural Route 623 (Suncheonhyang-ro)	Asan City	Sinchang-myeon	National Route 39 overlap
Chosa IS	초사 교차로	Mugunghwa-ro	Asan City	Onyang-dong	National Route 39 overlap
Jangchon IS	장촌 교차로	National Route 39 (Uiam-ro)	Asan City	Onyang-dong	National Route 39 overlap
Jwabu IS	좌부 교차로	Prefectural Route 623 (Gobul-ro)	Asan City	Onyang-dong	
Namdong IS	남동 교차로	Oncheon-daero	Asan City	Baebang-eup	
Mosan IS Baebang Station	모산사거리 배방역	Baebang-ro	Asan City	Baebang-eup	
No name	(이름 없음)	Oncheon-daero	Asan City	Baebang-eup	
Eunsu IS	은수 교차로	National Route 43 (Sejong ~ Pyeongtaek Motorway); Buksudong-ro	Asan City	Baebang-eup	
Bonggang IS Bonggang Bridge	봉강삼거리 봉강교	Hoseo-ro	Asan City	Baebang-eup	
Tangjeong IS (Segyo Underpass)	탕정교차로 (세교지하차도)	Saeasan-ro	Asan City	Baebang-eup	
No name	(이름 없음)	Huimang-ro	Asan City	Baebang-eup	
No name (Jangjae Underpass)	(이름 없음) (장재지하차도)	Gosokcheol-daero	Asan City	Baebang-eup	
Sinbang IS (Sinbang Underpass)	신방삼거리 (신방지하차도)	Chungmu-ro	Cheonan City	Dongnam District	
Hasin IS	하신삼거리	Sinchon 4-ro	Cheonan City	Dongnam District	
Saemal IS	새말사거리	Seobu-daero	Cheonan City	Dongnam District	
Nambu Overpass	남부고가교		Cheonan City	Dongnam District	
Cheongsam IS (Cheongsam Overpass)	청삼교차로 (청삼고가차도)	National Route 1 National Route 23 (Cheonan-daero)	Cheonan City	Dongnam District	
Chwiamsan Tunnel	취암산터널		Cheonan City	Dongnam District	Approximately 1360m
Gyocheon IS	교천교차로	Gyocheon 2-gil	Cheonan City	Dongnam District Mokcheon-eup	
Singye IS	신계교차로	Chungjeol-ro	Cheonan City	Dongnam District Mokcheon-eup	
Unjeon IS	운전교차로	Sinsaunjeon-gil	Cheonan City	Dongnam District Mokcheon-eup	
Hwaseong IS	화성교차로	5sandan-ro	Cheonan City	Dongnam District Seongnam-myeon	
Jangsan IS	장산교차로	Prefectural Route 693 (Susin-ro)	Cheonan City	Dongnam District Susin-myeon	
Byeongcheon Bridge	병천교		Cheonan City	Dongnam District Susin-myeon	
Byeongcheon Bridge			Cheonan City	Dongnam District Byeongcheon-myeon	
Changdeul 2 IS	창들2 교차로	Prefectural Route 696 (Maebong-ro)	Cheonan City	Dongnam District Byeongcheon-myeon	
Maebongsan Tunnel	매봉산터널		Cheonan City	Dongnam District Byeongcheon-myeon	Approximately 360m
Yongdu 1 Bridge Yongdu 2 Bridge	용두1교 용두2교		Cheonan City	Dongnam District Byeongcheon-myeon	
Yongdu IS	용두 교차로	Yongduri 2-gil	Cheonan City	Dongnam District Byeongcheon-myeon	
Gudo IS	구도 교차로	Gudo 2-gil	Cheonan City	Dongnam District Dong-myeon	
Hwagye IS	화계 교차로	Chungjeol-ro	Cheonan City	Dongnam District Dong-myeon	
Dongmyeon IS	동면삼거리	Dongsan 1-gil	Cheonan City	Dongnam District Dong-myeon	
Dongsan IS	동산삼거리	Hwabok-ro	Cheonan City	Dongnam District Dong-myeon	Continuation into North Chungcheong Province

=== North Chungcheong Province ===
Name	Hangul name	Connection	Location		Note
Botapsa IS	보탑사삼거리	Prefectural Route 313 (Munsa-ro); Gimyusin-gil	Jincheon County	Jincheon-eup	South Chungcheong Province - North Chungcheong Province border line
Seongam Elementary School	성암초등학교		Jincheon County	Jincheon-eup	
Saseok IS	사석삼거리	Munjin-ro	Jincheon County	Jincheon-eup	
Jatgogae	잣고개		Jincheon County	Jincheon-eup	
Guncheong IS Jincheon County Office	군청사거리 진천군청	Munhwa-ro; Sangsan-ro	Jincheon County	Jincheon-eup	
Byeokam IS	벽암사거리	National Route 34 (Baekgok-ro); Jungangbuk-ro	Jincheon County	Jincheon-eup	National Route 34 overlap
Seongseok IS	성석사거리	Jungangdong-ro; Jingwang-ro	Jincheon County	Jincheon-eup	National Route 34 overlap
Sinseong IS	신성사거리	National Route 34 (Munhwa-ro); Wondeok-ro	Jincheon County	Jincheon-eup	National Route 34 overlap
Jincheon IC (Angol IS)	진천 나들목 (안골삼거리)	Jungbu Expressway	Jincheon County	Jincheon-eup	
Gasan IS	가산삼거리	Gasan-gil	Jincheon County	Jincheon-eup	
No name	(이름 없음)	Deokgeum-ro	Jincheon County	Deoksan-myeon	
No name	(이름 없음)	Seupji-gil	Jincheon County	Deoksan-myeon	
No name	(이름 없음)	Prefectural Route 513 (Chogeum-ro)	Jincheon County	Deoksan-myeon	
Yongmong IS	용몽 교차로	Yongmong-ro	Jincheon County	Deoksan-myeon	
Sindon IS	신돈 교차로	Prefectural Route 533 (Wonjung-ro)	Eumseong County	Maengdong-myeon	
Bonseong IS	본성 교차로	Prefectural Route 533 (Deokgeum-ro)	Eumseong County	Maengdong-myeon	
Masan IS	마산 교차로	Prefectural Route 533 (Daedong-ro)	Eumseong County	Maengdong-myeon	
Sambong Bridge	삼봉교		Eumseong County	Geumwang-eup	
Geumwang-Kkotdongne IC (Geumwang-Kkotdongne IC IS)	금왕꽃동네 나들목 (금왕꽃동네IC 교차로)	Pyeongtaek–Jecheon Expressway; Maengdongsandanjiwon-ro	Eumseong County	Geumwang-eup	
Yuchon IS	유촌 교차로	Yuchon-ro	Eumseong County	Geumwang-eup	
Saeteo Bridge Oseon 2 Bridge	새터교 오선2교		Eumseong County	Geumwang-eup	
Oseon IS	오선 교차로	Prefectural Route 82 (Daegeum-ro)	Eumseong County	Geumwang-eup	
Gajin Bridge	가진교		Eumseong County	Geumwang-eup	
Naesong IS	내송 교차로	Prefectural Route 329 (Geumil-ro)	Eumseong County	Geumwang-eup	
Deokdong Bridge Gulam Bridge Eungcheon Bridge	덕동교 굴암교 응천교		Eumseong County	Geumwang-eup	
Jeongsaeng IS	정생 교차로	National Route 37 (Saengeum-daero)	Eumseong County	Geumwang-eup	National Route 37 overlap
Dosin IS	도신 교차로	Saengsam-ro	Eumseong County	Saenggeuk-myeon	National Route 37 overlap
Byeongam IS	병암 교차로	Prefectural Route 306 (Ilsaeng-ro); Eumseong-ro	Eumseong County	Saenggeuk-myeon	National Route 37 overlap Prefectural Route 306 overlap
Saenggeuk IS	생극사거리	Osin-ro	Eumseong County	Saenggeuk-myeon	National Route 37 overlap Prefectural Route 306 overlap
Saenggeuk IS	생극 교차로	National Route 3 Prefectural Route 306 (Jungwon-daero)	Eumseong County	Saenggeuk-myeon	National Route 3, National Route 37 overlap Prefectural Route 306 overlap
Chapyeong IS	차평 교차로	Eumseong-ro	Eumseong County	Saenggeuk-myeon	National Route 3, National Route 37 overlap Continuation into Gyeonggi Province
Wondang IS	원당교차로	Prefectural Route 520 (Wondang-gil)	Eumseong County	Gamgok-myeon	National Route 3, National Route 37 overlap Continuation into Gyeonggi Province
Cheongmicheon Bridge	청미천교		Eumseong County	Gamgok-myeon	National Route 3, National Route 37 overlap Continuation into Gyeonggi Province

=== Gyeonggi Province ===
Name	Hangul name	Connection	Location		Note
Cheongmicheon Bridge	청미천교		Icheon City	Janghowon-eup	National Route 3, National Route 37 overlap North Chungcheong Province - Gyeonggi Province border line Terminus
Jinam IC	진암 나들목	National Route 3 (Jungwon-daero); National Route 37; National Route 38 (Seodong-daero)	Icheon City	Janghowon-eup	National Route 3, National Route 37 overlap North Chungcheong Province - Gyeonggi Province border line Terminus
