= National Cemetery station =

Metro station in Daejeon, South Korea

118 현충원 (한밭대) National Cemetery (Hanbat Nat'l Univ.)
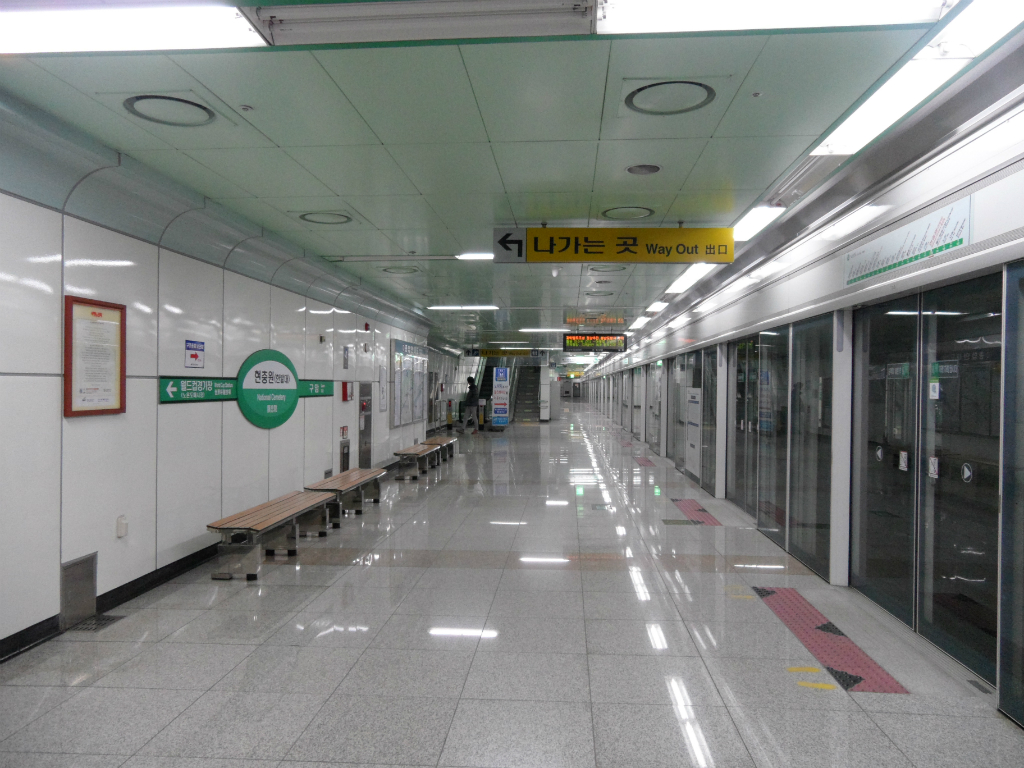
- National Cemetery Station platform

Korean name
- Hangul: 현충원역
- Hanja: 顯忠院驛
- Revised Romanization: Hyeonchungwon yeok
- McCune–Reischauer: Hyŏnch'ungwŏn yŏk

General information
- Location: Guam-dong, Yuseong District, Daejeon; South Korea
- Coordinates: 36°21′33″N 127°19′17″E
- Operator: Daejeon Metropolitan Express Transit Corporation
- Line: Daejeon Metro Line 1
- Platforms: 2
- Tracks: 2

Other information
- Station code: 118

History
- Opened: April 17, 2007; 19 years ago

Services
Preceding station	Daejeon Metro	Following station
Guam towards Panam	Line 1	World Cup Stadium towards Banseok
Location

National Cemetery Station (Korean: 현충원역; Hanja: 顯忠院驛) is a station of Daejeon Metro Line 1 in Guam-dong, Yuseong District, Daejeon, South Korea. The station provides access to the Daejeon National Cemetery.
