= National Route 40 (South Korea) =

Road in South Korea

National Route 40
- 국도 제40호선

Route information
- Length: 145.6 km (90.5 mi)
- Existed: 14 March 1981–present

Major junctions
- West end: Dangjin, South Chungcheong Province
- East end: Gongju, South Chungcheong Province

Location
- Country: South Korea

Highway system
- Highway systems of South Korea; Expressways; National; Local

National Route 40 is a national highway in South Korea connects Dangjin to Gongju. It established on 14 March 1981

== History ==
- March 14, 1981: National Route 40, the Daecheon–Gongju Line, was established.
- April 16, 1981: The 64.808 km section between Myeongcheon-ri, Daecheon-eup, Boryeong County, and Jung-dong, Gongju-eup, Gongju County, which had been elevated to national highway status, was opened.
- May 30, 1981: The road district was determined for the newly established 65 km section following the amendment of the General National Highway Route Designation Decree by Presidential Decree No. 10247.
- May 13, 1986: The starting point was changed from Daecheon-eup, Daecheon County, South Chungcheong Province, to Daecheon City, South Chungcheong Province.
- May 26, 1987: The existing designated section between Galsan-ri and Mansu-ri, Oesan-myeon, Buyeo County, was abolished.
- January 20, 1988: A 630 m section of Seongju Tunnel in Seongju-ri, Seongju-myeon, Boryeong County, was opened, while the existing 1.65 km section was abolished.
- January 17, 1992: The 584 m section between Chobong-ri and Yongseong-ri, Iin-myeon, Gongju County, was opened, while the existing 628 m section was abolished.
- February 18, 1995: The 1.1 km section between Yongjeong-ri and Gajeung-ri, Buyeo-eup, Buyeo County, was opened, while the existing 1.5 km section was abolished.
- July 1, 1996: The starting point was changed from Daecheon City, South Chungcheong Province, to Boryeong City, South Chungcheong Province.
- July 14, 1999: A 540 m section in Yuram-ri, Naesan-myeon, Buyeo County, was opened, while the existing 470 m section was abolished.
- August 31, 2000: The 2.2 km section between Seong-ri and Samgak-ri, Tancheon-myeon, Gongju City, was newly constructed and opened, while the existing 2 km section was abolished.
- August 25, 2001: The starting point was extended from Boryeong City, South Chungcheong Province, to Deoksan-myeon, Yesan County. Accordingly, the route became the Yesan–Gongju Line.
- October 15, 2001: The 61.1 km section between Dun-ri, Deoksan-myeon, Yesan County, and Myeongcheon-dong, Boryeong City, which had been elevated to national highway status, was opened.
- November 7, 2001: The 4.98 km section between Daecheon-dong and Boryeong-ri, Jupo-myeon, Boryeong City, was widened and opened, while the existing section was abolished.
- July 10, 2002: The 4.11 km section between Gwang-ri, Seobu-myeon, Hongseong County, and Sangchon-ri, Galsan-myeon, was widened and opened.
- August 14, 2006: The 15.9 km section between Samgak-ri, Tancheon-myeon, and Ungjin-dong, Gongju City, was widened and opened, while the existing 9.8 km section between Samgak-ri, Tancheon-myeon, and Jubong-ri, Iin-myeon, Gongju City, was abolished.
- December 22, 2006: The 800 m Geochaji District road in Eosa-ri, Seobu-myeon, Hongseong County, was improved and opened, while the existing 400 m section was abolished. The 1.5 km Iho 1 District road between Iho-ri and Gwang-ri, Seobu-myeon, was also opened, while the existing 400 m section was abolished. The 720 m Iho 2 District road in Iho-ri, Seobu-myeon, was opened, while the existing 400 m section was abolished. The 870 m section between Oera-ri and Naera-ri, Deoksan-myeon, Yesan County, was improved and opened, while the existing 500 m section was abolished.
- November 17, 2008: A section of Local Route 622 between Deoksan-myeon, Yesan County, and Hapdeok-eup, Dangjin County, was elevated to national highway status, extending the starting point from Deoksan-myeon to Hapdeok-eup. Accordingly, the route was renamed from the Yesan–Gongju Line to the Dangjin–Gongju Line.
- November 17, 2008: The 18.33 km section between Unsan-ri, Hapdeok-eup, Dangjin County, and Dun-ri, Deoksan-myeon, Yesan County, which had been elevated to national highway status, was opened, while the existing 300 m section was abolished.
- December 31, 2008: The 7.49 km Guryong–Buyeo road between Jujeong-ri, Guryong-myeon, and Dongnam-ri, Buyeo-eup, Buyeo County, was widened and opened.
- December 22, 2009: The 7.04 km section between Gwanchang-ri, Jukyo-myeon, Boryeong City, and Myeongcheon-dong was widened and opened, while the existing 8.5 km section through the city center was abolished.
- December 31, 2009: The 12.33 km section between Gatap-ri, Buyeo-eup, Buyeo County, and Seong-ri, Tancheon-myeon, Gongju City, was widened and opened. The existing 7.8 km section between Yongjeong-ri and Jeoseok-ri, Buyeo-eup, and the existing 1.0 km section between Bungang-ri and Seong-ri, Tancheon-myeon, were abolished.
- December 31, 2020: The 2.4 km Hongseong Seobu–Namdang bypass road between Namdang-ri and Sin-ri, Seobu-myeon, Hongseong County, was widened and opened, while the existing 3.2 km section was abolished.
- December 27, 2023: The 14.76 km Boryeong–Buyeo road between Dohwadam-ri, Misan-myeon, Boryeong City, and Jujeong-ri, Guryong-myeon, Buyeo County, was widened and opened, while the existing 11.5 km section was abolished.
- December 30, 2024: The 4.4 km Boryeong Seongju bypass road between Eumnae-ri, Nampo-myeon, and Gaehwa-ri, Seongju-myeon, Boryeong City, was opened, while the existing 7.7 km section between Myeongcheon-dong, Boryeong City, and Gaehwa-ri, Seongju-myeon, was abolished.

== Main stopovers ==
- South Chungcheong

Dangjin- Yesan County- Hongseong County- Boryeong- Buyeo County- Gongju

== Major intersections ==
IC: Interchange

Name	Hangul name	Connections	Location		Note
Directly connected with Prefectural Route 622
(Under Unsan 1 bridge)	(운산1교 하부)	National Route 32; Prefectural Route 622	Dangjin	Hapdeok-eup	Terminus
Jaeoh Ridge entrance			Dangjin	Hapdeok-eup	
Godeok IC	고덕 나들목	Dangjin-Yeongdeok Expressway	Yesan County	Godeok-myeon	
Daecheon Intersection	대천 교차로	Prefectural Route 619	Yesan County	Godeok-myeon	
Daeji Intersection	대지사거리	Prefectural Route 618; Prefectural Route 619	Yesan County	Godeok-myeon	
Godeok Middle School	고덕중학교		Yesan County	Godeok-myeon	
Daeji Intersection	대지삼거리	Godeokjungang-ro	Yesan County	Bongsan-myeon	
Hapyeong Intersection	하평삼거리	Bongsan-ro	Yesan County	Bongsan-myeon	
No name	(이름 없음)	Yedeok-ro	Yesan County	Bongsan-myeon	
Eubnae Intersection	읍내 교차로	Prefectural Route 609 (Deoksanoncheon-ro); Bonggun-ro; Chungui-ro	Yesan County	Bongsan-myeon	
Songshan Intersection	송산 교차로	National Route 45; Prefectural Route 70 (Yun Bong-gil); Prefectural Route 609 (Docheong-daero)	Yesan County	Sapgyo-eup	
Sinri Bridge	신리대교		Yesan County	Sapgyo-eup	
Deoksan Hot Spring Intersection	덕산온천 교차로	Deoksan Hot Spring	Yesan County	Deoksan-myeon	
Sudeoksa Intersection	수덕사 교차로	National Route 45; Prefectural Route 70 (Yun Bong-gil); Sudeoksa-ro	Yesan County	Deoksan-myeon	
Sudeoksa Entrance	수덕사입구		Yesan County	Deoksan-myeon	
Oera Intersection	외나사거리	Hongdeokseo-ro	Yesan County	Deoksan-myeon	
Sudeok Elementary School	수덕초등학교		Yesan County	Deoksan-myeon	
Guseong Bridge	구성교		Yesan County	Deoksan-myeon	
Gagok Elementary School (closed)	가곡초등학교(폐교)		Hongseong	Galsan-myeon	
Hongseong IC	홍성 나들목	Seohaean Expressway; National Route 29; Galsan-ro	Hongseong	Galsan-myeon	
Sangchon Intersection	상촌교차로	National Route 29; Sangchon-ro; Walyong-ro	Hongseong	Galsan-myeon	
Galsan Intersection	갈산교차로	Baekya-ro	Hongseong	Galsan-myeon	
Galsan tunnel	갈산터널		Hongseong	Galsan-myeon	390m long
Odu Intersection	오두교차로	Galsanseo-gil	Hongseong	Galsan-myeon	
Gwangri Intersection	광리교차로	Prefectural Route 96 (Cheonsuman-ro); Seobuseo road	Hongseong	Seobu-myeon	
Miho Intersection	이호삼거리	Walyong-ro; Yihogil	Hongseong	Seobu-myeon	
Hongseong West Middle School	홍성서부중학교		Hongseong	Seobu-myeon	
No name	(이름 없음)	Hongnamseo-ro 285 beon-gil	Hongseong	Seobu-myeon	
Gongchon Intersection	송촌삼거리	Prefectural Route 96 (Hongnamseo-ro)	Hongseong	Seobu-myeon	
No name	(이름 없음)	Seobu-ro 43 beon-gil	Hongseong	Seobu-myeon	
Eosa Intersection	어사교차로	Namdanghang-ro	Hongseong	Seobu-myeon	
Eosa-ri bus stop	어사리정류소		Hongseong	Seobu-myeon	
Naedongma Village Entrance	내동마을입구	Namdanghang-ro 264 beon-gil	Hongseong	Seobu-myeon	
Namdang Port	남당항		Hongseong	Seobu-myeon	
Anheungdong Intersection	안흥동삼거리	Hongbo-ro	Hongseong	Seobu-myeon	
Hongseong seawall Intersection	홍성방조제삼거리	Imhae-ro	Hongseong	Seobu-myeon	
Hongseong Bridge	홍성교		Hongseong	Seobu-myeon	
Hongseong seawall	홍성방조제		Boryeong	Cheonbuk-myeon	
Cheonbuk Intersection	천북삼거리	Hagung road	Boryeong	Cheonbuk-myeon	
Haman Intersection	하만삼거리	Prefectural Route 622 (Cheongwang-ro)	Boryeong	Cheonbuk-myeon	
Boryeong Bridge Boryeong seawall	보령교 보령방조제		Boryeong	Cheonbuk-myeon	
Soseong Intersection	소성삼거리	Prefectural Route 610 (Chungcheonsuyeong-ro)	Boryeong	Ocheon-myeon	
Sinchon Intersection	신촌삼거리	Prefectural Route 610 (Domihang-ro)	Boryeong	Ocheon-myeon	
Galhyeon Entrance	갈현입구	Dolgogae-gil	Boryeong	Cheongso-myeon	
Magang 2	마강2리앞	Oncheonjungang-ro	Boryeong	Jupo-myeon	
Oncheonwaseon Bridge	오천과선교		Boryeong	Jupo-myeon	
Jupo Intersection	주포사거리	National Route 21 (Chungseo-ro); Bỏyeongeupseong-gil	Boryeong	Jupo-myeon	
Bongdang Intersection	봉당삼거리		Boryeong	Jupo-myeon	
Gwangsan Intersection	관산사거리	Yupoyeok-gil	Boryeong	Jupo-myeon	
Chungseo-ro Intersection	충서로사거리		Boryeong	Jupo-myeon	
Jugyo Intersection	주교사거리	Prefectural Route 610 (Ulgyekeun-gil)	Boryeong	Jupo-myeon	
Gwanchang Intersection	관창교차로	Boryeongbuk-ro	Boryeong	Jugyo-myeon	
Bonghwang tunnel	봉황터널		Boryeong	Daecheon-dong	
Hwasan Intersection	화산교차로	National Route 36; National Route 77 (Daecheong-ro)	Boryeong	Daecheon-dong	
Yeongcheon Intersection	명천교차로	National Route 21; National Route 77 (Chungseo-ro)	Boryeong	Daecheon-dong	
Seongju tunnel	성주터널		Boryeong	Daecheon-dong	720m long
Seongju Intersection	성주삼거리	Simwongyegong-ro	Boryeong	Seongju-myeon	
Boryeong Coal Museum	보령석탄박물관		Boryeong	Seongju-myeon	
Gawha Arts Park	개화예술공원		Boryeong	Seongju-myeon	
Chungcheongnamgaehwa Elementary School	충남개화초등학교		Boryeong	Seongju-myeon	
Gaewa Intersection	개화삼거리	Prefectural Route 606 (Mansu-ro)	Boryeong	Seongju-myeon	
Dowhadam Elementary School (closed)	도화담초등학교(폐교)		Boryeong	Misan-myeon	
Dohwadam Intersection	도화담삼거리	Prefectural Route 617	Boryeong	Misan-myeon	
Sulibawi Intersection	수리바위삼거리	Oesan-ro	Buyeo County	Oesan-myeon	
Oesan Intersection	외산사거리	Prefectural Route 606 (Mansu-ro)	Buyeo County	Oesan-myeon	
Jiti Intersection	지티교앞	Prefectural Route 613 (Sabi-ro)	Buyeo County	Naesan-myeon	
Minam Intersection	미암교차로	Seongchung-ro	Buyeo County	Naesan-myeon	
Juam Intersection	주암 교차로	Sukdong-ro	Buyeo County	Naesan-myeon	
Unchi Intersection	운치교차로	Seongchung-ro jilmajae-gil	Buyeo County	Naesan-myeon	
Julam Intersection	율암 교차로	Seongchung-ro	Buyeo County	Naesan-myeon	
Yulam Bridge	율암교		Buyeo County	Naesan-myeon	
Yonggang Middle School	용강중학교		Buyeo County	Guryong-myeon	
Gulyong Intersection	구룡삼거리	Heungsu-ro	Buyeo County	Guryong-myeon	
Sujeong Intersection	주정삼거리	National Route 4 Prefectural Route 723 (Daebaekje-ro)	Buyeo County	Guryong-myeon	
Meoggogae Intersection	먹고개삼거리	Prefectural Route 723 (Chungui-ro)	Buyeo County	Guryong-myeon	
Gubong Intersection	구봉교차로	National Route 4 (Daebaekje-ro); Heungsu-ro	Buyeo County	Guryong-myeon	
Hapsong Intersection	합송교차로	Hapsongseo-ro	Buyeo County	Gyuam-myeon	
Naeli Intersection	내리 교차로	National Route 29; National Route 39 (Gyuamuhoedo-ro)	Buyeo County	Gyuam-myeon	
Gyuam Intersection	규암 교차로	Prefectural Route 625 (Chungjeol-ro)	Buyeo County	Gyuam-myeon	
Buyeodae Bridge	부여대교		Buyeo County	Gyuam-myeon	
Buyeodae Bridge			Buyeo County	Buyeo-eup	
Buyeo Intersection	부여 교차로	Seongwang-ro	Buyeo County	Buyeo-eup	
Daewang Intersection	대왕 교차로	Geumseong-ro	Buyeo County	Buyeo-eup	
Gatap Intersection	가탑 교차로	National Route 4 (Daebaejek-ro)	Buyeo County	Buyeo-eup	
Dongmun Intersection	동문삼거리	Gatap-ro	Buyeo County	Buyeo-eup	
Roundabout	대향로로터리	Bukpo-ro; Seongwang-ro	Buyeo County	Buyeo-eup	
Yongjeong Intersection	용정교차로	Samchung-ro	Buyeo County	Buyeo-eup	
Jeongdong Intersection	정동교차로	Prefectural Route 625 (Baekjemun-ro)	Buyeo County	Buyeo-eup	
Jawang Intersection	자왕교차로	Samchung-ro	Buyeo County	Buyeo-eup	
Sinjeong Intersection	신정교차로	Bukpo-ro	Buyeo County	Buyeo-eup	
Wangjin Intersection	왕진교차로	Prefectural Route 645 (Wangjin-ro)	Buyeo County	Buyeo-eup	
Joseok Intersection	저석교차로	Prefectural Route 651 (Baekjekeung-gil)	Buyeo County	Buyeo-eup	
Ochon Intersection	오촌교차로	Prefectural Route 651 (Baekjekeung-gil)	Buyeo County	Buyeo-eup	
Bundang Intersection	분강교차로	Changam-gil	Gongju	Tancheon-myeon	
Seongli Intersection	성리교차로	Prefectural Route 645 (Deungsan-ro)	Gongju	Tancheon-myeon	
No name	(이름 없음)	Prefectural Route 799 (Geumbaek-ro)	Gongju	Tancheon-myeon	One way
Samgak Intersection	삼각교차로	Prefectural Route 799 (Geumbaek-ro)	Gongju	Tancheon-myeon	
Dalsan Intersection	달산교차로	Prefectural Route 96 (Geumbawi-ro)	Gongju	Iin-myeon	
Iin Intersection	이인교차로	Prefectural Route 697 (Geumgang-ro)	Gongju	Iin-myeon	
Jubong Intersection	주봉교차로	Geombawi-ro	Gongju	Iin-myeon	
Taebong Intersection	태봉교차로	Ugeumti-ro	Gongju	Geumhak-dong	
Bongjeong Intersection	봉정교차로	Ugeumti-ro	Gongju	Geumhak-dong	
Namgyeongju IC	남공주 나들목	Nonsan–Cheonan Expressway	Gongju	Geumhak-dong	
Geomsang Intersection	검상교차로	Geomsangan-gil	Gongju	Geumhak-dong	
Saejae Intersection	새재교차로		Gongju	Geumhak-dong	
Intersection (front of the police station)	경찰서앞교차로	Muryeong-ro	Gongju	Ungjin-dong	
Gongju Art & Culture Center	공주문예회관	Gomanalu-gil	Gongju	Ungjin-dong	
Gongju Middle School Gongju Office of Education Tomb	공주중학교 공주교육지원청 왕릉교		Gongju	Ungjin-dong	
Gongsanseong Roundabout	공산성 회전교차로	Ungjin-ro	Gongju	Ungjin-dong	
Gongsanseong Fortress	공산성		Gongju	Ungjin-dong	
Geumgang Bridge	금강교		Gongju	Ungjin-dong	
Geumgang Bridge		National Route 32; Prefectural Route 96 (Geumbyeok-ro); Uidang-ro	Gongju		
Jeonmak Intersection	전막 교차로	National Route 32; Prefectural Route 96 (Geumbyeok-ro); Uidang-ro	Gongju	Singwan-dong	Terminus
