= Yesan County =

Coordinates: 36°40′45″N 126°50′42″E

Yesan
- County
- Panoramic view of Yesan-eup

- Flag Emblem of Yesan

- Location in South Korea
- Country: South Korea
- Region: Hoseo
- Administrative divisions: 2 eup, 10 myeon

Area
  - Total: 542.65 km^{2} (209.52 sq mi)

Population (September 2024)
  - Total: 78,195
  - Density: 141.25/km^{2} (365.8/sq mi)
  - Dialect: Chungcheong

Korean name
- Hangul: 예산군
- Hanja: 禮山郡
- RR: Yesan-gun
- MR: Yesan-gun

Yesan County (Korean: 예산군; [jesanɡun]) is a county in South Chungcheong Province, South Korea. Famous people from Yesan include independence fighter Yoon Bong-Gil.

Sudeoksa, a head temple of the Jogye Order of Korean Buddhism, is located on the southern slopes of Deoksungsan in Deoksan-myeon, Yesan County. Its main hall is daeungjeon (大雄殿), Korea's oldest wooden building and National Treasure 49.

In 2009, Yesan was designated a "slow city," one in which traditional cultures and communities are preserved.

== Transportation ==
- Yesan Citybus

== Sister cities ==
=== Domestic ===
- Seocho-gu, Seoul
- Seongbuk-gu, Seoul
- Yeonsu-gu, Incheon
- Anyang, Gyeonggi

=== International ===
- Knoxville, Tennessee, United States

== Gallery ==
Historic Site Related to Yun Bong-gil

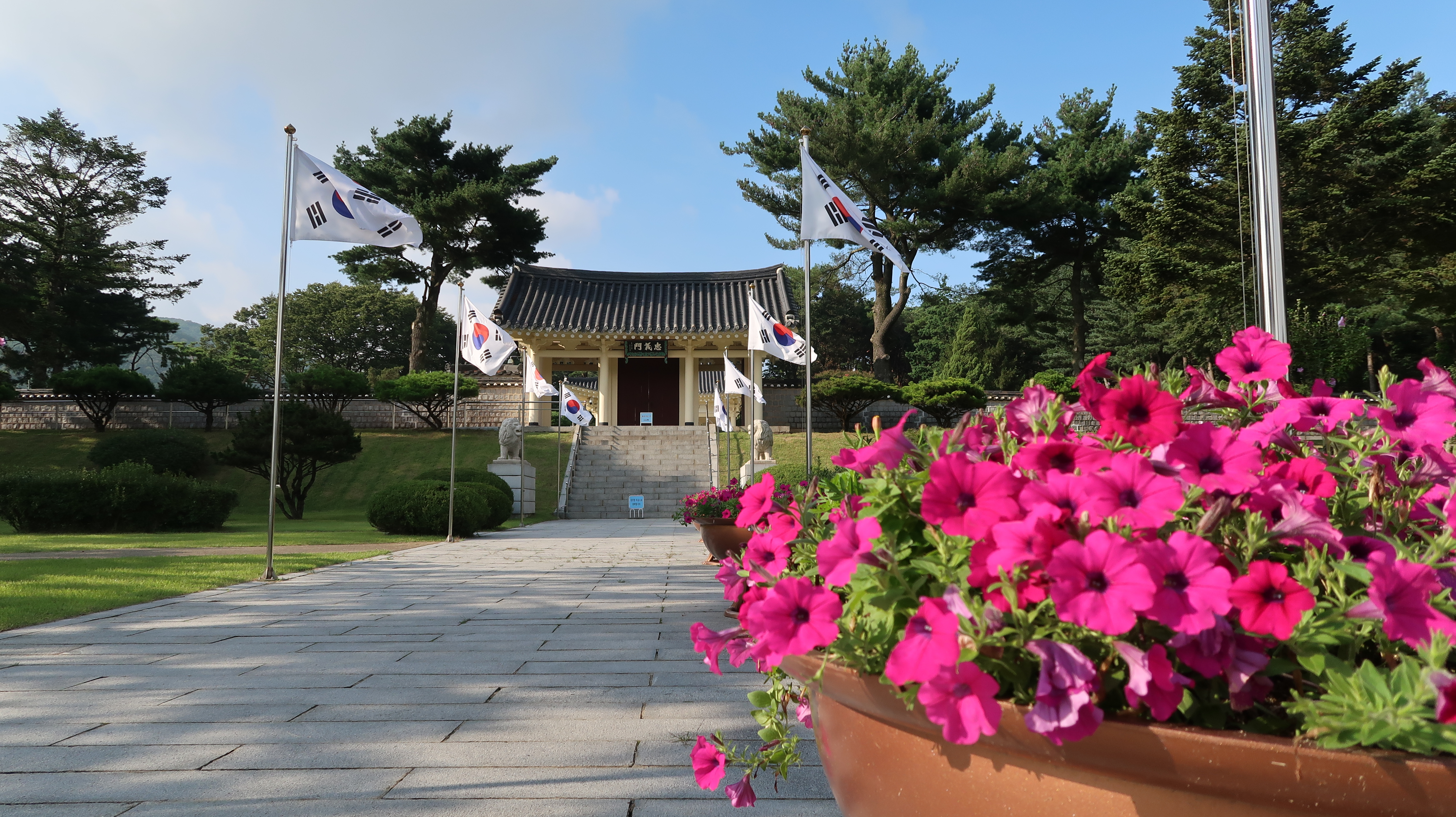

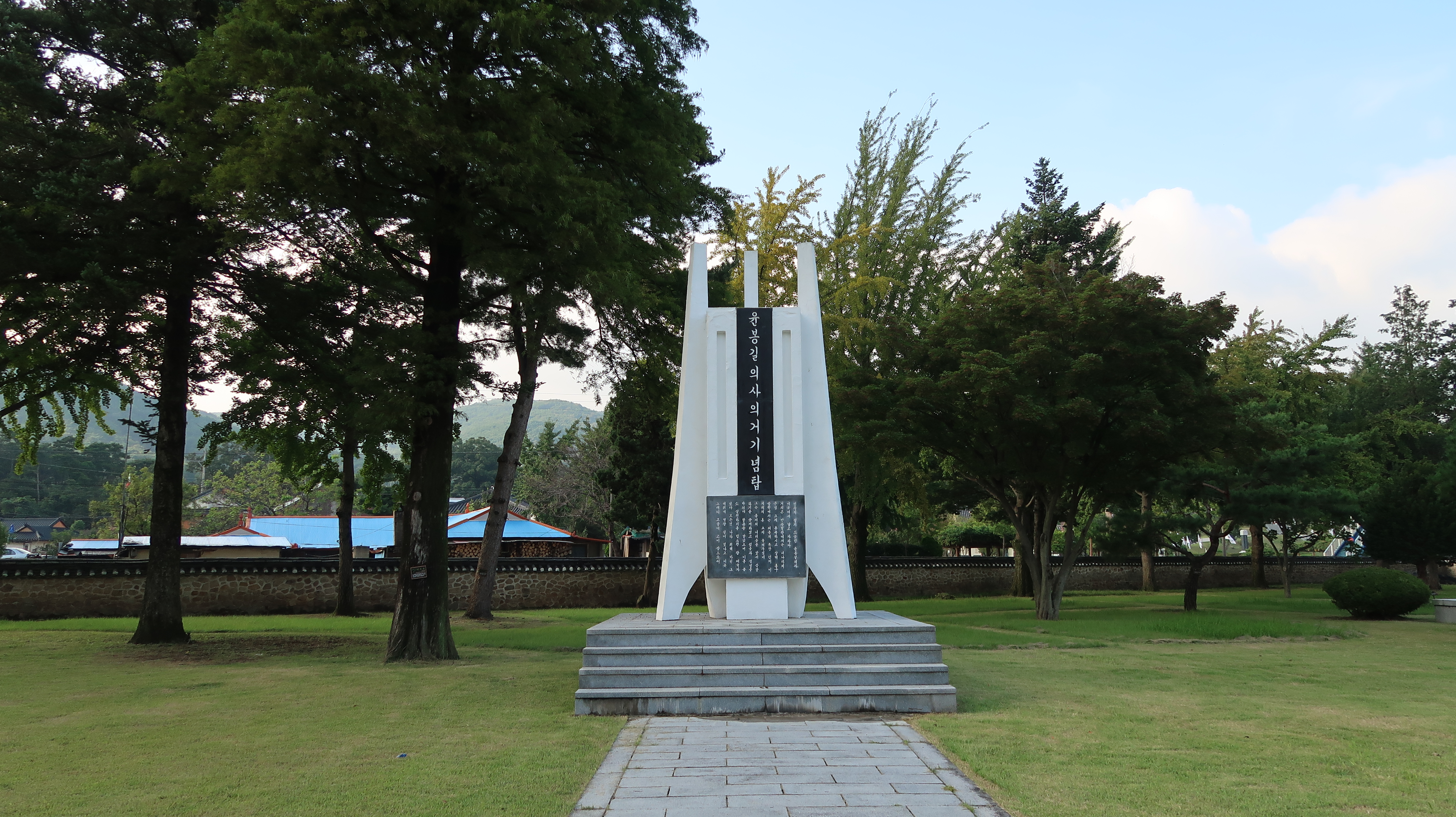

== Notable people ==
- Song So-hee; singer
- Park Hyo-shin; singer
- Yun Dae-nyeong; Author
- Yun Bong-gil; fighter for independence
- Hwang Sun-hong; former footballer and current manager
- Baek Jong-won; food researcher, businessman, entertainer.
- Shinyu (Shin Jung-hwan); singer, member of TWS

== See also ==
- Sapgyo
