= Local Route 15 (South Korea) =

Road in South Korea

State-Funded Local Highway 15
- 국가지원지방도 제15호선
- Oenaro-do–Yeonggwang Line 외나로도 ~ 영광선

Route information
- Length: 261.6 km (162.6 mi)
- Existed: 19 July 1996–present

Major junctions
- From: Bongnae-myeon, Goheung County, South Jeolla
- To: Hongnong-eup, Yeonggwang County, South Jeolla

Location
- Country: South Korea
- Major cities: Suncheon

Highway system
- Highway systems of South Korea; Expressways; National; Local

Local Route 15 Oenaro-do–Yeonggwang Line (Korean: 국가지원지방도 제15호선 외나로도 ~ 영광선) is a local route of South Korea that connects Bongnae-myeon, Goheung County, South Jeolla Province to Hongnong-eup in Yeonggwang County, South Jeolla Province.

== History ==
This route was established on 19 July 1996.

== Stopovers ==
South Jeolla Province

- Goheung County - Boseong County - Suncheon - Boseong County - Hwasun County - Gokseong County - Damyang County - Jangseong County

North Jeolla Province

- Gochang County

South Jeolla Province

- Yeonggwang County

== Major intersections ==
- (■): Motorway

IS: Intersection, IC: Interchange

=== South Jeolla Province (Goheung -> Jangseong) ===
Name	Hangul name	Connection	Location		Note
Oecho-ri	외초리	Uju-ro	Goheung County	Bongnae-myeon	Terminus
Yeompo Harbour	염포항	Sangol-gil	Goheung County	Bongnae-myeon	
Yeompo IS	염포 교차로		Goheung County	Bongnae-myeon	
Oecho Bridge	외초교		Goheung County	Bongnae-myeon	
Oecho IS	외초 교차로	Keunjomswae 1-gil	Goheung County	Bongnae-myeon	
Naecho IS	내초 교차로	Uju-ro	Goheung County	Bongnae-myeon	
Gyodong Bridge	교동교		Goheung County	Bongnae-myeon	
Gyodong IS	교동 교차로	Uju-ro; Haban-ro	Goheung County	Bongnae-myeon	
Jogunaru IS	조구나루 교차로	Ppeolgeum-gil; Jogunaru-gil	Goheung County	Bongnae-myeon	
Donggwang 1 IS	동광1 교차로	Donggwangbichi-gil	Goheung County	Bongnae-myeon	
Wondu IS Bongnae Middle School	원두 교차로 봉래중학교	Wondu-gil; Chukjeong 1-gil	Goheung County	Bongnae-myeon	
Bongnae IS	봉래 교차로	Chukjeong 1-gil	Goheung County	Bongnae-myeon	
Singeum IS	신금 교차로	Singeum-gil; Jonggo-gil	Goheung County	Bongnae-myeon	National Route 15 overlap
Naro 2 Bridge	나로2대교		Goheung County	Bongnae-myeon	National Route 15 overlap
Naro 2 Bridge			Goheung County	Dongil-myeon	National Route 15 overlap
Soyeong IS	소영삼거리	Bongyeong-ro	Goheung County	Dongil-myeon	National Route 15 overlap
Dongil-myeon Office	동일면사무소	Yanghwa-gil	Goheung County	Dongil-myeon	National Route 15 overlap
Baekyang Elementary School	백양초등학교	Bongyeong-ro	Goheung County	Dongil-myeon	National Route 15 overlap
Seopjeong IS	섭정삼거리	Deokheungeumjjok-gil	Goheung County	Dongil-myeon	National Route 15 overlap
Deokheung IS	덕흥삼거리	Deogyangseowon-gil	Goheung County	Dongil-myeon	National Route 15 overlap
Naro 1 Bridge	나로1대교		Goheung County	Dongil-myeon	National Route 15 overlap
Naro 1 Bridge			Goheung County	Podu-myeon	National Route 15 overlap
Namseong IS	남성삼거리	National Route 77 (Cheonma-ro)	Goheung County	Podu-myeon	National Route 15, National Route 77 overlap
Dongnaedo IS	동래도삼거리		Goheung County	Podu-myeon	National Route 15, National Route 77 overlap
Bongam IS	봉암삼거리	Bongam-gil	Goheung County	Podu-myeon	National Route 15, National Route 77 overlap
Podunam Middle School (Closed)	포두남중학교 (폐교)		Goheung County	Podu-myeon	National Route 15, National Route 77 overlap
Okgang IS	옥강삼거리	National Route 77 (Palyeong-ro); Oecho-gil	Goheung County	Podu-myeon	National Route 15, National Route 77 overlap
Naesan IS	내산삼거리	Sinheungdong-gil	Goheung County	Podu-myeon	National Route 15 overlap
Mihu IS	미후삼거리	Sinsedong-ro	Goheung County	Podu-myeon	National Route 15 overlap
Sedong IS	세동삼거리	Prefectural Route 855 (Dohwa-ro)	Goheung County	Podu-myeon	National Route 15 overlap Prefectural Route 855 overlap
Podu Bridge Podu Elementary School Podu-myeon Office	포두교 포두초등학교 포두면사무소		Goheung County	Podu-myeon	National Route 15 overlap Prefectural Route 855 overlap
Podu IS	포두사거리	Geumtap-ro; Hudong 2-gil	Goheung County	Podu-myeon	National Route 15 overlap Prefectural Route 855 overlap
Jangsu IS	장수삼거리	Prefectural Route 855 (Haechang-ro)	Goheung County	Podu-myeon	National Route 15 overlap Prefectural Route 855 overlap
Goheung IS	고흥삼거리	Bongdongjugong-gil	Goheung County	Goheung-eup	National Route 15 overlap
Dongchon Bridge	동촌교		Goheung County	Goheung-eup	National Route 15 overlap
Hohyeong IS	호형 교차로	National Route 27; National Route 77 (Ujuhanggong-ro); Hakgyo-gil	Goheung County	Goheung-eup	National Route 15, National Route 27, National Route 77 overlap
Namgye IS	남계 교차로	Goheung-ro	Goheung County	Goheung-eup	National Route 15, National Route 27, National Route 77 overlap
Jideung IS	지등 교차로	Goheung-ro	Goheung County	Duwon-myeon	National Route 15, National Route 27, National Route 77 overlap
Janghang Bridge	장항교		Goheung County	Duwon-myeon	National Route 15, National Route 27, National Route 77 overlap
Undae IS	운대 교차로	Prefectural Route 830 (Duwonunseok-gil); Goheung-ro; Geumo-gil	Goheung County	Duwon-myeon	National Route 15, National Route 27, National Route 77 overlap
Sinan IS	신안 교차로	Goheung-ro	Goheung County	Jeomam-myeon	National Route 15, National Route 27, National Route 77 overlap
Yeonbong IS	연봉 교차로	Prefectural Route 855 (Haechang-ro); Goheung-ro	Goheung County	Jeomam-myeon	National Route 15, National Route 27, National Route 77 overlap
Sajeong Overpass	사정육교		Goheung County	Jeomam-myeon	National Route 15, National Route 27, National Route 77 overlap
Seokbong IS	석봉 교차로	Gwayeok-ro	Goheung County	Gwayeok-myeon	National Route 15, National Route 27, National Route 77 overlap
Gwayeok IS	과역 교차로	Goheung-ro	Goheung County	Gwayeok-myeon	National Route 15, National Route 27, National Route 77 overlap
Nosong IS	노송 교차로	Goheung-ro; Gwayeok-ro	Goheung County	Gwayeok-myeon	National Route 15, National Route 27, National Route 77 overlap
Namyang IS	남양 교차로	Goheung-ro; Namyang-ro; Namnyanghuimang-gil	Goheung County	Namyang-myeon	National Route 15, National Route 27, National Route 77 overlap
Tanpo IS	탄포 교차로	National Route 77 (Goheung-ro); Apyeong-gil; Ungyojugok-gil	Goheung County	Namyang-myeon	National Route 15, National Route 27, National Route 77 overlap
Gyemae IS	계매 교차로	Goheung-ro; Ondong-gil	Goheung County	Donggang-myeon	National Route 15, National Route 27 overlap
Yudun 2 Bridge	유둔2교		Goheung County	Donggang-myeon	National Route 15, National Route 27 overlap
Donggang IS	동강 교차로	Dongseo-ro; Donggangjungchon-gil	Goheung County	Donggang-myeon	National Route 15, National Route 27 overlap
Maegok Bridge	매곡교		Goheung County	Donggang-myeon	National Route 15, National Route 27 overlap
Maegok IS	매곡 교차로	Goheung-ro; Donggangsinjeong-gil	Goheung County	Donggang-myeon	National Route 15, National Route 27 overlap
Jangdeok IS	장덕 교차로	Goheung-ro	Goheung County	Donggang-myeon	National Route 15, National Route 27 overlap
Hancheon IS	한천 교차로	Goheung-ro (Namhae Expressway)	Goheung County	Donggang-myeon	National Route 15, National Route 27 overlap Connected with Goheung IC
Anjeong Bridge	안정교		Boseong County	Beolgyo-eup	National Route 15, National Route 27 overlap
Beolgyo IS	벌교 교차로	National Route 2 Prefectural Route 843 (Noksaek-ro)	Boseong County	Beolgyo-eup	National Route 15, National Route 27 overlap
Beolgyo Tunnel	벌교터널		Boseong County	Beolgyo-eup	National Route 15, National Route 27 overlap Approximately 745m
Jeondong IS	전동 교차로	Chaedongseon-ro	Boseong County	Beolgyo-eup	National Route 15, National Route 27 overlap
Goeup IS	고읍 교차로	Chaedongseon-ro	Boseong County	Beolgyo-eup	National Route 15, National Route 27 overlap
Nakseong IS	낙성 교차로	Chaedongseon-ro; Beolgyojungheung-gil; Beolgyojidong-gil	Boseong County	Beolgyo-eup	National Route 15, National Route 27 overlap
Seokgeorijae Tunnel	석거리재터널		Boseong County	Beolgyo-eup	National Route 15, National Route 27 overlap Approximately 520m
Seokgeorijae Tunnel			Suncheon City	Oeseo-myeon	National Route 15, National Route 27 overlap Approximately 520m
Oeseo IS	외서 교차로	Prefectural Route 58 (Ssanghyangsu-gil)	Suncheon City	Oeseo-myeon	National Route 15, National Route 17 overlap
Ssangyul IS	쌍율 교차로	Ssangyul-gil; Ssanghyangsu-gil	Suncheon City	Oeseo-myeon	National Route 15, National Route 17 overlap
Guryong IS	구룡 교차로	Ssanghyangsu-gil	Suncheon City	Songgwang-myeon	National Route 15, National Route 17 overlap
Ieup IS	이읍 교차로	Ssanghyangsu-gil	Suncheon City	Songgwang-myeon	National Route 15, National Route 17 overlap
Songgwang-myeon Office	송광면사무소		Suncheon City	Songgwang-myeon	National Route 15, National Route 17 overlap
Gokcheon IS	곡천삼거리	National Route 18; National Route 27 (Songgwangsa-gil)	Suncheon City	Songgwang-myeon	National Route 15, National Route 18, National Route 27 overlap
Gokcheon Bridge	곡천교		Suncheon City	Songgwang-myeon	National Route 15, National Route 18 overlap
Dolmen Park	고인돌공원		Suncheon City	Songgwang-myeon	National Route 15, National Route 18 overlap
Yongam IS (Juamho Sculpture Park) (Soh Jaipil Memorial Park)	용암삼거리 (주암호조각공원) (서재필기념공원)	National Route 18 (Songjae-ro)	Boseong County	Mundeok-myeon	National Route 15, National Route 18 overlap
Mundeok Bridge Juksan Bridge	문덕교 죽산교		Boseong County	Mundeok-myeon	National Route 15 overlap
Daewonsa IS	대원사삼거리	Juksan-gil	Boseong County	Mundeok-myeon	National Route 15 overlap
Bok Bridge	복교		Hwasun County	Nam-myeon	National Route 15 overlap
Namgye IS	남계삼거리	Yuma-ro	Hwasun County	Nam-myeon	National Route 15 overlap
Jusan 2 Bridge Jusan 1 Bridge Sasu 2 Bridge Sasu 1 Bridge Hapsumok Bridge	주산2교 주산1교 사수2교 사수1교 합수목교		Hwasun County	Nam-myeon	National Route 15 overlap
Oenamcheon Bridge	외남천교	Saho-ro	Hwasun County	Nam-myeon	National Route 15 overlap
Wonjin IS	원진 교차로	Prefectural Route 822 (Gimsatgat-ro)	Hwasun County	Nam-myeon	National Route 15 overlap
Sapyeong Tunnel	사평터널		Hwasun County	Nam-myeon	National Route 15 overlap Right tunnel: Approximately 350m Left tunnel: Approximately 330m
Byeoksong Bridge	벽송교		Hwasun County	Nam-myeon	
Byeoksong Overpass	벽송육교	Saho-ro	Hwasun County	Nam-myeon	
Guam IS	구암 교차로	National Route 22 (Hwasun-ro)	Hwasun County	Dong-myeon	National Route 15, National Route 22 overlap
Guam IS	구암삼거리	Chungui-ro	Hwasun County	Dong-myeon	National Route 15, National Route 22 overlap
Bokam IS	복암삼거리	Prefectural Route 897 (Gyubong-ro)	Hwasun County	Dong-myeon	National Route 15, National Route 22 overlap
Gyeongchi-ri IS	경치리 교차로	Jeokbyeong-ro	Hwasun County	Iseo-myeon	National Route 15, National Route 22 overlap
Yeonwol IS	연월 교차로	National Route 22 (Dongju-ro)	Hwasun County	Dongbok-myeon	National Route 15, National Route 22 overlap
Dongbok Bridge	동복교		Hwasun County	Dongbok-myeon	National Route 15 overlap
Dongbok IS Dongbokhapdong Bus stop	동복삼거리 동복합동정류소	Prefectural Route 822 (Gimsatgat-ro); Cheonbyeon-gil	Hwasun County	Dongbok-myeon	National Route 15 overlap
Dongbok Elementary School	동복초등학교		Hwasun County	Dongbok-myeon	National Route 15 overlap
Cheonbyeon-ri IS	천변리 교차로	Ojiho-ro	Hwasun County	Dongbok-myeon	National Route 15 overlap
Gyeongyeol Bridge	경열교		Hwasun County	Dongbok-myeon	National Route 15 overlap
Dokjae Tunnel	독재터널		Hwasun County	Dongbok-myeon	National Route 15 overlap Approximately 625m
Dokjae Tunnel			Hwasun County	Buk-myeon	National Route 15 overlap Approximately 625m
Dagok IS	다곡삼거리	Muryeom-ro	Hwasun County	Buk-myeon	National Route 15 overlap
Hwasun Bukmyeon Middle School	화순북면중학교		Hwasun County	Buk-myeon	National Route 15 overlap
Icheon-ri IS	이천리 교차로	Hakcheon-gil	Hwasun County	Buk-myeon	National Route 15 overlap
Wonri IS	원리삼거리	Wonri-gil	Hwasun County	Buk-myeon	National Route 15 overlap
Wonri IS	원리사거리	Prefectural Route 887 (Baeka-ro); Wonri 1-gil	Hwasun County	Buk-myeon	National Route 15 overlap
Gwaneumsa Entrance	관음사입구	Seongdeokgwaneum-gil	Gokseong County	Osan-myeon	National Route 15 overlap
Simcheong Culture Center	심청문화센터		Gokseong County	Osan-myeon	National Route 15 overlap
Dansa IS	단사삼거리	Sanijae-ro	Gokseong County	Osan-myeon	National Route 15 overlap
Osan-myeon Office Osan Elementary School	오산면사무소 오산초등학교		Gokseong County	Osan-myeon	National Route 15 overlap
Okgwa IC (Osan IS)	옥과 나들목 (오산 교차로)	Honam Expressway; National Route 13 (Oksun-ro)	Gokseong County	Osan-myeon	National Route 13, National Route 15 overlap
Osan IS	오산삼거리	Osan-ro	Gokseong County	Osan-myeon	National Route 13, National Route 15 overlap
Orye IS	오례삼거리	Prefectural Route 60 (Changpyeonghyeon-ro)	Damyang County	Mujeong-myeon	National Route 13, National Route 15 overlap
No name	(이름 없음)	Prefectural Route 887 (Pyeongjijeongseok-gil)	Damyang County	Mujeong-myeon	National Route 13, National Route 15 overlap Prefectural Route 887 overlap
Anpyeong Entrance	안평입구	Prefectural Route 897 (Byeongmong-ro)	Damyang County	Mujeong-myeon	National Route 13, National Route 15 overlap Prefectural Route 887 overlap
Mujeong-myeon Office	무정면사무소		Damyang County	Mujeong-myeon	National Route 13, National Route 15 overlap Prefectural Route 887 overlap
Damyang Police Station	담양경찰서		Damyang County	Damyang-eup	National Route 13, National Route 15 overlap Prefectural Route 887 overlap
Baekdong IS	백동사거리	National Route 24 (Jukhyangmunhwa-ro); National Route 29; Prefectural Route 55 (Jukhyang-daero)	Damyang County	Damyang-eup	National Route 13, National Route 15, National Route 24, National Route 29 overlap Prefectural Route 55, 887 overlap
Damyang-eup IS	담양읍삼거리	National Route 24; Prefectural Route 55 (Jukhyang-daero)	Damyang County	Damyang-eup	National Route 13, National Route 15, National Route 24, National Route 29 overlap Prefectural Route 55, 887 overlap
Dongun IS	동운삼거리	Jichim 6-gil	Damyang County	Damyang-eup	National Route 13, National Route 15, National Route 29 overlap Prefectural Route 887 overlap
Damyang Public Bus Terminal	담양공용버스터미널		Damyang County	Damyang-eup	National Route 13, National Route 15, National Route 29 overlap Prefectural Route 887 overlap
Jungpa IS	중파사거리	National Route 13; National Route 29; Prefectural Route 887 (Chuseong-ro)	Damyang County	Damyang-eup	National Route 13, National Route 29 overlap Prefectural Route 887 overlap
Damyang Bridge	담양교	Prefectural Route 887 (Cheonbyeon 5-gil)	Damyang County	Damyang-eup	National Route 13 overlap Prefectural Route 887 overlap
Yanggak IS (Damyang Fire Station)	양각사거리 (담양소방서)	National Route 13 (Chuseong-ro); National Route 24 (Jukhyangmunhwa-ro)	Damyang County	Damyang-eup	National Route 13 overlap
Manseong Roundabout	만성 회전교차로	Jukhyangmunhwa-ro; Sisan 1-gil	Damyang County	Damyang-eup	
Manhwa 1 Bridge	만화1교		Damyang County	Damyang-eup	
Manhwa 1 Bridge			Damyang County	Wolsan-myeon	
Masan IS	마산사거리	Dogae-gil; Hwabangmasan-gil	Damyang County	Wolsan-myeon	
Songjeong Bridge	송정교		Damyang County	Wolsan-myeon	
Songjeong IS	송정사거리	Gasan-gil; Dogae-gil	Damyang County	Wolsan-myeon	
Wolgok IS	월곡사거리	Wolgok-gil	Damyang County	Wolsan-myeon	
Yongheung IS	용흥 교차로	Dodong-gil; Yongheungsa-gil; Wolsongjeong-gil	Damyang County	Wolsan-myeon	
Yongam Bridge	용암교		Damyang County	Wolsan-myeon	
Daeheung IS	대흥사거리	Daeheung-gil	Jangseong County	Bukha-myeon	
Daeheung Bridge Seongam Bridge	대흥교 성암교		Jangseong County	Bukha-myeon	
Seongam IS	성암삼거리	Bukhaseongam-gil	Jangseong County	Bukha-myeon	
Myeongchi IS	명치삼거리		Jangseong County	Bukha-myeon	
Jungpyeong IS	중평삼거리	Prefectural Route 49 (Danpung-ro)	Jangseong County	Bukha-myeon	Prefectural Route 49 overlap
Yaksu 2 Bridge	약수2교		Jangseong County	Bukha-myeon	Prefectural Route 49 overlap
Bukha IS	북하사거리	National Route 1 (Danpung-ro); Yaksu 2-gil	Jangseong County	Bukha-myeon	National Route 1 overlap Prefectural Route 49 overlap
Yaksu IS	약수삼거리	Baekyang-ro	Jangseong County	Bukha-myeon	National Route 1 overlap Prefectural Route 49 overlap
Wondong IS	원동 교차로	National Route 1 Wondong-gil; Yaksu 2-gil	Jangseong County	Bukha-myeon	National Route 1 overlap Prefectural Route 49 overlap
Jangseongho tourist attraction Ssangung Bridge	장성호관광지 쌍웅교		Jangseong County	Bukha-myeon	National Route 1 overlap Prefectural Route 49 overlap
Sinseong IS	신성 교차로	National Route 1	Jangseong County	Bukha-myeon	
Gomjae	곰재		Jangseong County	Bukha-myeon	National Route 1 overlap Prefectural Route 49 overlap
Gomjae			Jangseong County	Buki-myeon	National Route 1 overlap Prefectural Route 49 overlap
Saga IS	사가삼거리	Prefectural Route 734 (Bongam-ro)	Jangseong County	Buki-myeon	National Route 1 overlap Prefectural Route 49 overlap
Buki-myeon Office	북이면사무소		Jangseong County	Buki-myeon	National Route 1 overlap Prefectural Route 49 overlap
Baekyang Station IS (Baekyang Station) (Jangseong IS Bus Terminal)	백양역사거리 (백양사역) (장성사거리버스여객터미널)	National Route 1 (Galjae-ro)	Jangseong County	Buki-myeon	National Route 1 overlap Prefectural Route 49 overlap
Sinchang Bridge	신창교		Jangseong County	Buki-myeon	Prefectural Route 49 overlap
Baekyangsa IC (Baekyangsa IC IS)	백양사 나들목 (백양사IC 교차로)	Honam Expressway	Jangseong County	Buki-myeon	Prefectural Route 49 overlap
Buki-myeon Baekam-ri IS	북이면백암리 교차로	Dotjae-ro	Jangseong County	Buki-myeon	Prefectural Route 49 overlap
Baekam Bridge	백암교		Jangseong County	Buki-myeon	Prefectural Route 49 overlap
Buki-myeon Jukcheong-ri IS	북이면죽청리 교차로	Mangol-ro	Jangseong County	Buki-myeon	Prefectural Route 49 overlap
Yanggosaljae	양고살재		Jangseong County	Buki-myeon	Prefectural Route 49 overlap Continuation into North Jeolla Province

=== North Jeolla Province ===
Name	Hangul name	Connection	Location		Note
Yanggosaljae	양고살재		Gochang County	Gochang-eup	Prefectural Route 49 overlap South Jeolla Province - North Jeolla Province border line
Seokjeong Oncheon IS	석정온천 교차로	Prefectural Route 49; Prefectural Route 708 (Soljae-ro)	Gochang County	Gochang-eup	Prefectural Route 49 overlap South Jeolla Province - North Jeolla Province border line
Wolsan Bridge	월산교		Gochang County	Gochang-eup	
(Suwol)	(수월)	Dongni-ro; Undongjang-gil	Gochang County	Gochang-eup	
Oncheon Bridge	온천교		Gochang County	Gochang-eup	
(Hoejeon IS)	(회전교차로)	Jungang-ro	Gochang County	Gochang-eup	
No name	(이름 없음)	Wolgok-ro	Gochang County	Gochang-eup	
Wolgok Underpass	월곡지하차도		Gochang County	Gochang-eup	
Seomgdu IS (Seongdu Bridge)	성두 교차로 (성두교)	National Route 23 (Goindol-daero); Moyangseong-ro	Gochang County	Gochang-eup	
Doldam Bridge Seokgyo 2 Bridge Hakjeon Bridge	돌담교 석교2교 학전교		Gochang County	Gochang-eup	
Gochang IC (Gochang IC IS)	고창 나들목 (고창IC 교차로)	Seohaean Expressway; Jungang-ro	Gochang County	Gochang-eup	
Jugok IS	주곡 교차로	Nokdu-ro	Gochang County	Gochang-eup	
Gosu Bridge	고수교		Gochang County	Gochang-eup	
Dosan IS	도산 교차로	Doksil-ro	Gochang County	Gochang-eup	
Goindol IS	고인돌 교차로	Nokdu-ro; Goindolgongwon-gil	Gochang County	Gochang-eup	
Cheongsol Bridge	청솔교		Gochang County	Gochang-eup	
Asan 3 Bridge	아산3교		Gochang County	Asan-myeon	
Asan IS	아산 교차로	Incheongangbyeon-ro	Gochang County	Asan-myeon	
Asan 1 Bridge	아산1교		Gochang County	Asan-myeon	
Daedong IS	대동 교차로	Prefectural Route 733 (Huieojae-ro)	Gochang County	Asan-myeon	
Bangwol IS	방월 교차로	Bangjugan-gil	Gochang County	Asan-myeon	
Seonggi IS	성기 교차로	Seonggi-gil	Gochang County	Asan-myeon	
Songhyeon IS	송현 교차로	Prefectural Route 734 (Songhyeon-ro)	Gochang County	Mujang-myeon	
Songhyeon Bridge	송현교		Gochang County	Mujang-myeon	
Gungdong IS	궁동 교차로	Songnimsan-ro	Gochang County	Mujang-myeon	
Mujang IS	무장 교차로	Mujangnambuk-ro	Gochang County	Mujang-myeon	
Dogok IS	도곡 교차로	Songnimsan-ro	Gochang County	Mujang-myeon	
Yanggok IS	양곡 교차로	Naesan-gil	Gochang County	Mujang-myeon	
Chilgok IS	칠곡 교차로	Chilgok-gil	Gochang County	Haeri-myeon	
Songsan IS	송산 교차로	Haerisongsan-gil	Gochang County	Haeri-myeon	
Songsan Bridge	송산교		Gochang County	Haeri-myeon	
(Unnamed IS) (Underpass)	(교차로 명칭 미상) (고가차도)	Prefectural Route 733 (Naseong-ro) (Haryeon 2-gil); Cheonghae 1-gil	Gochang County	Haeri-myeon	
Amsan Bridge Hwasan Bridge	안산교 화산교		Gochang County	Haeri-myeon	
Gungsan IS	궁산삼거리	National Route 22; National Route 77 (Seonnun-daero)	Gochang County	Haeri-myeon	National Route 22, National Route 77 overlap
Wanggeo IS	왕거삼거리		Gochang County	Haeri-myeon	National Route 22, National Route 77 overlap
Bangchuk IS	방축삼거리	Saban-ro	Gochang County	Haeri-myeon	National Route 22, National Route 77 overlap
Jiro IS	지로사거리	Prefectural Route 733 (Naseong-ro)	Gochang County	Haeri-myeon	National Route 22, National Route 77 overlap Prefectural Route 733 overlap
Geomsan IS	검산삼거리	Sangha-ro	Gochang County	Sangha-myeon	National Route 22, National Route 77 overlap Prefectural Route 733 overlap
Sangha Terminal	상하터미널		Gochang County	Sangha-myeon	National Route 22, National Route 77 overlap Prefectural Route 733 overlap
Sin IS	신사거리	Sangha 1-gil	Gochang County	Sangha-myeon	National Route 22, National Route 77 overlap Prefectural Route 733 overlap
Sangha IS	상하 교차로	Prefectural Route 733 (Jinamgusipo-ro)	Gochang County	Sangha-myeon	National Route 22, National Route 77 overlap Prefectural Route 733 overlap
Yongdeok IS	용덕삼거리	Sangha-ro	Gochang County	Sangha-myeon	National Route 22, National Route 77 overlap
Yongdae IS	용대삼거리	National Route 77 (Saemmok-ro)	Gochang County	Sangha-myeon	National Route 22, National Route 77 overlap
Origin of Donghak Peasant Revolution	동학농민혁명발상지		Gochang County	Gongeum-myeon	National Route 22 overlap
Gongeum IS	공음삼거리	Chamnamujeong 1-gil	Gochang County	Gongeum-myeon	National Route 22 overlap
Sinpyeong IS	신평삼거리	Gongeum-gil	Gochang County	Gongeum-myeon	National Route 22 overlap Continuation into South Jeolla Province

=== South Jeolla Province (Yeonggwang County section) ===
Name	Hangul name	Connection	Location		Note
Samdeok IS	삼덕삼거리	Yongseongwolsan-ro 1-gil	Yeonggwang County	Beopseong-myeon	National Route 22 overlap North Jeolla Province - South Jeolla Province border line
Daedeok IS	대덕삼거리	Yongseongwolsan-ro	Yeonggwang County	Beopseong-myeon	National Route 22 overlap North Jeolla Province - South Jeolla Province border line
Seongjae IS	성재 교차로	National Route 22 (Yeonggwang-ro)	Yeonggwang County	Beopseong-myeon	National Route 22 overlap North Jeolla Province - South Jeolla Province border line
Bubseong High School Bubseong Middle School	법성고등학교 법성중학교		Yeonggwang County	Beopseong-myeon	
Beopseongpo Elementary School	법성포초등학교	Saemmok-ro	Yeonggwang County	Beopseong-myeon	
Beopseong Terminal IS	법성터미널앞 교차로	Prefectural Route 842 (Gulbi-ro 3-gil); Yeonggwang-ro	Yeonggwang County	Beopseong-myeon	Prefectural Route 842 overlap
Post office IS	우체국앞 교차로	Jingulbi-gil	Yeonggwang County	Beopseong-myeon	Prefectural Route 842 overlap
Beopseong Harbor	법성항	Gulbi-ro 1-gil Beopseongpo-ro 2-gil	Yeonggwang County	Beopseong-myeon	Prefectural Route 842 overlap
Beopseongjinseong	법성진성		Yeonggwang County	Beopseong-myeon	Prefectural Route 842 overlap
No name	(이름 없음)	Baekjemunhwa-ro	Yeonggwang County	Beopseong-myeon	Prefectural Route 842 overlap
Hongnong Bridge	홍농교		Yeonggwang County	Beopseong-myeon	Prefectural Route 842 overlap
Hongnong Bridge			Yeonggwang County	Hongnong-eup	Prefectural Route 842 overlap
Hongnong-eup Sangha-ri IS	홍농읍상하리 교차로	National Route 77; Prefectural Route 842 (Hongnong-ro)	Yeonggwang County	Hongnong-eup	National Route 77 overlap Prefectural Route 842 overlap
Hongnong IS	홍농사거리	National Route 77 (Dongbu-ro)	Yeonggwang County	Hongnong-eup	National Route 77 overlap
Hongnong Safety Center	홍농119안전센터	Sangha-gil	Yeonggwang County	Hongnong-eup	
Jindeok IS	진덕삼거리	Jindeok-ro	Yeonggwang County	Hongnong-eup	
Hanbit Nuclear Power Plant	한빛원자력발전소		Yeonggwang County	Hongnong-eup	Terminus

== See also ==
- South Jeolla Province
- North Jeolla Province
- National Route 15
