= National Route 15 (South Korea) =

Road in South Korea

National Route 15
- 국도 제15호선

Route information
- Length: 223.5 km (138.9 mi)
- Existed: 31 August 1971–present

Major junctions
- South end: Naro Space Center, Goheung County
- North end: Donggye-myeon, Suncheng County (current); Jucheon-myeon, Namwon (planned)

Location
- Country: South Korea

Highway system
- Highway systems of South Korea; Expressways; National; Local
← National Route 14	→ National Route 16

National Route 15 (Korean: 국도 제15호선; RR: gukdo je15hoseon) is a national highway in South Korea connects Goheung County to Damyang County. It established on 31 August 1971.

== History ==
- August 31, 1971: Became National Route 15 Naro Island ~ Gwangju Line by the General National Highway Route Designation Decree.
- September 11, 1971: Due to bypass section straight construction, road zone changed from 5.203 km section in Isipgok-ri, Hwasun-eup, Hwasun-gun ~ Saseon-gyo-dong, Gwangju-si to 2.302 km, and 800m section in Gwayeok-ri, Gwayeok-myeon, Goheung-gun to 780m
- March 14, 1972: Due to road route improvement, road zone changed from 335m section in Namje-ri, Goheung-myeon, Goheung-gun to 320m
- October 1, 1975: Total 1.14 km section from Undae-ri, Duwon-myeon, Goheung-gun ~ Baeksong-ri, Nam-myeon, Hwasun-gun opened and existing 1.23 km section abolished
- December 8, 1975: Total 2.2 km section from Yudun-ri, Donggang-myeon ~ Gwayeok-ri, Gwayeok-myeon, Goheung-gun opened and existing 1.15 km section abolished
- March 14, 1981: End point extended from 'Gwangju-si, Jeollanam-do' to 'Damyang-eup, Damyang-gun, Jeollanam-do'. Accordingly changed from 'Naro Island ~ Gwangju Line' to 'Naro Island ~ Damyang Line'.
- May 30, 1981: Road zone changed to the extended 22 km section according to the amendment of Presidential Decree No. 10247 General National Highway Route Designation Decree
- August 17, 1981: 22.314 km section from Chungjang-ro 5-ga, Dong-gu, Gwangju-si ~ Gaeksa-ri, Damyang-eup, Damyang-gun upgraded to national highway opened
- January 19, 1993: Goheung Bypass Road (Hohyeong-ri ~ Namgye-ri, Goheung-eup, Goheung-gun) 1.68 km section opened
- December 15, 1994: Okgang-ri, Podu-myeon ~ Baegyang-ri, Dongil-myeon, Goheung-gun 4.92 km section opened
- November 2, 1995: Bongyeong-ri, Dongil-myeon ~ Singeum-ri, Bongrae-myeon, Goheung-gun 3.42km section opened
- July 31, 2000: Gildu-ri, Podu-myeon, Goheung-gun 520m section improvement opening, existing 500m section abolished
- September 9, 2003: Until September 15, Namgye-ri, Goheung-eup, Goheung-gun ~ Cheongnyeong-ri, Beolgyo-eup, Boseong-gun 33.3km section temporarily opened
- December 31, 2003: Hohyeong-ri, Goheung-eup ~ Namyang-ri, Namyang-myeon, Goheung-gun 18.86km section expansion opening
- January 1, 2004: Until January 31, Namgye-ri, Goheung-eup, Goheung-gun ~ Cheongnyeong-ri, Beolgyo-eup, Boseong-gun 33.36km section temporarily opened
- April 6, 2004: Namyang-ri, Namyang-myeon ~ Hancheon-ri, Donggang-myeon, Goheung-gun 11.3km section expansion opening
- September 13, 2004: Namyang-ri, Namyang-myeon, Goheung-gun ~ Cheongnyeong-ri, Beolgyo-eup, Boseong-gun 14.5km section expansion opening, until October 4, Cheongnyeong-ri ~ Jeondong-ri, Beolgyo-eup, Boseong-gun 2.86km section temporarily opened
- December 31, 2004: Namyang-ri, Namyang-myeon, Goheung-gun ~ Jeondong-ri, Beolgyo-eup, Boseong-gun 17.36km section expansion opening
- September 15, 2005: Jeolsan-ri, Nam-myeon ~ Bogam-ri, Dong-myeon, Hwasun-gun 5.5km section expansion opening, existing Sapyeong-ri ~ Byeoksong-ri, Nam-myeon, Hwasun-gun 3.5km section abolished
- January 12, 2009: Beolgyo ~ Juam Road (Go-eup-ri, Beolgyo-eup, Boseong-gun ~ Ieup-ri, Songgwang-myeon, Suncheon-si) 14.25 km section designated as automobile-only road
- March 27, 2016: Beolgyo ~ Juam Road Section 1 (Go-eup-ri, Beolgyo-eup, Boseong-gun ~ Geumseong-ri, Oeseo-myeon, Suncheon-si) 10.34 km section expansion opening, existing 12.04 km section abolished
- October 31, 2016: Beolgyo ~ Juam Road Section 2 (Ssangnyul-ri, Oeseo-myeon ~ Ieup-ri, Songgwang-myeon, Suncheon-si) 4.5 km section expansion opening, existing 5.7 km section abolished
- December 30, 2020: Goheung ~ Bongrae Road (Okgang-ri, Podu-myeon, Goheung-gun) 3.7km section expansion opening, existing road total 700m section abolished
- June 22, 2021: Starting point changed from 'Singeum-ri, Bongrae-myeon, Goheung-gun, Jeollanam-do' to 'Yenae-ri, Bongrae-myeon, Goheung-gun, Jeollanam-do', end point changed from 'Gaeksa-ri, Damyang-eup, Damyang-gun, Jeollanam-do' to 'Songchi-ri, Jucheon-myeon, Namwon-si, Jeollabuk-do'. Accordingly changed from 'Goheung ~ Damyang Line' to 'Goheung ~ Namwon Line'. Existing section from Mujeong-myeon ~ Damyang-eup, Damyang-gun that was duplicated with National Route 13 was designated and route changed to end point at Jucheon-myeon, Namwon-si via Okgwa-myeon, Gokseong-gun and Gangjin-myeon, Imsil-gun

== Main stopovers ==
South Jeolla Province

- Goheung County - Boseong County - Suncheon - Boseong County - Hwasun County - Gokseong County - Damyang County

== Major intersections ==
- (■): Motorway

IS: Intersection, IC: Interchange

=== South Jeolla Province ===
Name	Hangul name	Connection	Location		Note
Directly connected with Prefectural Route 15
Singeum IS	신금 교차로	Prefectural Route 15 (Uju-ro); Singeum-gil; Jonggo-gil	Goheung County	Bongnae-myeon	Terminus
Naro 2 Bridge	나로2대교		Goheung County	Bongnae-myeon	
Naro 2 Bridge			Goheung County	Dongil-myeon	
Soyeong IS	소영삼거리	Bongyeong-ro	Goheung County	Dongil-myeon	
Dongil-myeon Office	동일면사무소	Yanghwa-gil	Goheung County	Dongil-myeon	
Baekyang Elementary School	백양초등학교	Bongyeong-ro	Goheung County	Dongil-myeon	
Seopjeong IS	섭정삼거리	Deokheungeumjjok-gil	Goheung County	Dongil-myeon	
Deokheung IS	덕흥삼거리	Deogyangseowon-gil	Goheung County	Dongil-myeon	
Naro 1 Bridge	나로1대교		Goheung County	Dongil-myeon	
Naro 1 Bridge			Goheung County	Podu-myeon	
Namseong IS	남성삼거리	National Route 77 (Cheonma-ro)	Goheung County	Podu-myeon	National Route 77 overlap
Dongraedo IS	동래도삼거리		Goheung County	Podu-myeon	National Route 77 overlap
Bongam IS	봉암삼거리	Bongam-gil	Goheung County	Podu-myeon	National Route 77 overlap
Podunam Middle School (Closed)	포두남중학교 (폐교)		Goheung County	Podu-myeon	National Route 77 overlap
Okgang IS	옥강삼거리	National Route 77 (Palyeong-ro); Oecho-gil	Goheung County	Podu-myeon	National Route 77 overlap
Naesan IS	내산삼거리	Sinheungdong-gil	Goheung County	Podu-myeon	
Mihu IS	미후삼거리	Sinsedong-ro	Goheung County	Podu-myeon	
Sedong IS	세동삼거리	Prefectural Route 855 (Dohwa-ro)	Goheung County	Podu-myeon	Prefectural Route 855 overlap
Podu Bridge Podu Elementary School Podu-myeon Office	포두교 포두초등학교 포두면사무소		Goheung County	Podu-myeon	Prefectural Route 855 overlap
Podu IS	포두사거리	Geumtap-ro; Hudong 2-gil	Goheung County	Podu-myeon	Prefectural Route 855 overlap
Jangsu IS	장수삼거리	Prefectural Route 855 (Haechang-ro)	Goheung County	Podu-myeon	Prefectural Route 855 overlap
Goheung IS	고흥삼거리	Bongdongjugong-gil	Goheung County	Goheung-eup	
Dongchon Bridge	동촌교		Goheung County	Goheung-eup	
Hohyeong IS	호형 교차로	National Route 27; National Route 77 (Ujuhanggong-ro); Hakgyo-gil	Goheung County	Goheung-eup	National Route 27, National Route 77 overlap
Namgye IS	남계 교차로	Goheung-ri	Goheung County	Goheung-eup	National Route 27, National Route 77 overlap
Jideung IS	지등 교차로	Goheung-ro	Goheung County	Duwon-myeon	National Route 27, National Route 77 overlap
Janghang Bridge	장항교		Goheung County	Duwon-myeon	National Route 27, National Route 77 overlap
Undae IS	운대 교차로	Prefectural Route 830 (Duwonunseok-gil); Goheung-ro; Geumo-gil	Goheung County	Duwon-myeon	National Route 27, National Route 77 overlap
Sinan IS	신안 교차로	Goheung-ro	Goheung County	Jeomam-myeon	National Route 27, National Route 77 overlap
Yeonbong IS	연봉 교차로	Prefectural Route 855 (Haechang-ro); Goheung-ro	Goheung County	Jeomam-myeon	National Route 27, National Route 77 overlap
Sajeong Overpass	사정육교		Goheung County	Jeomam-myeon	National Route 27, National Route 77 overlap
Seokbong IS	석봉 교차로	Gwayeok-ro	Goheung County	Gwayeok-myeon	National Route 27, National Route 77 overlap
Gwayeok IS	과역 교차로	Goheung-ro	Goheung County	Gwayeok-myeon	National Route 27, National Route 77 overlap
Nosong IS	노송 교차로	Goheung-ro; Gwayeok-ro	Goheung County	Gwayeok-myeon	National Route 27, National Route 77 overlap
Namyang IS	남양 교차로	Goheung-ro; Namyang-ro; Namnyanghuimang-gil	Goheung County	Namyang-myeon	National Route 27, National Route 77 overlap
Tanpo IS	탄포 교차로	National Route 77 (Goheung-ro); Apyeong-gil; Ungyojugok-gil	Goheung County	Namyang-myeon	National Route 27, National Route 77 overlap
Gyemae IS	계매 교차로	Goheung-ro; Ondong-gil	Goheung County	Donggang-myeon	National Route 27 overlap
Yudun 2 Bridge	유둔2교		Goheung County	Donggang-myeon	National Route 27 overlap
Donggang IS	동강 교차로	Dongseo-ro; Donggangjungchon-gil	Goheung County	Donggang-myeon	National Route 27 overlap
Maegok Bridge	매곡교		Goheung County	Donggang-myeon	National Route 27 overlap
Maegok IS	매곡 교차로	Goheung-ro; Donggangsinjeong-gil	Goheung County	Donggang-myeon	National Route 27 overlap
Jangdeok IS	장덕 교차로	Goheung-ro	Goheung County	Donggang-myeon	National Route 27 overlap
Hancheon IS	한천 교차로	Goheung-ro (Namhae Expressway)	Goheung County	Donggang-myeon	National Route 27 overlap Connected with Goheung IC
Anjeong Bridge	안정교		Boseong County	Beolgyo-eup	National Route 27 overlap
Beolgyo IS	벌교 교차로	National Route 2 Prefectural Route 843 (Noksaek-ro)	Boseong County	Beolgyo-eup	National Route 27 overlap
Beolgyo Tunnel	벌교터널		Boseong County	Beolgyo-eup	National Route 27 overlap Approximately 720m
Jeondong IS	전동 교차로	Chaedongseon-ro	Boseong County	Beolgyo-eup	National Route 27 overlap
Goeup IS	고읍 교차로	Chaedongseon-ro	Boseong County	Beolgyo-eup	National Route 27 overlap
Nakseong IS	낙성 교차로	Chaedongseon-ro; Beolgyojungheung-gil; Beolgyojidong-gil	Boseong County	Beolgyo-eup	National Route 27 overlap
Seokgeorijae Tunnel	석거리재터널		Boseong County	Beolgyo-eup	National Route 27 overlap Approximately 520m
Seokgeorijae Tunnel			Suncheon City	Oeseo-myeon	National Route 27 overlap Approximately 520m
Oeseo IS	외서 교차로	Prefectural Route 58 (Ssanghyangsu-gil)	Suncheon City	Oeseo-myeon	National Route 17 overlap
Ssangyul IS	쌍율 교차로	Ssangyul-gil; Ssanghyangsu-gil	Suncheon City	Oeseo-myeon	National Route 17 overlap
Guryong IS	구룡 교차로	Ssanghyangsu-gil	Suncheon City	Songgwang-myeon	National Route 17 overlap
Ieup IS	이읍 교차로	Ssanghyangsu-gil	Suncheon City	Songgwang-myeon	National Route 17 overlap
Songgwang-myeon Office	송광면사무소		Suncheon City	Songgwang-myeon	National Route 17 overlap
Gokcheon IS	곡천삼거리	National Route 18; National Route 27 (Songgwangsa-gil)	Suncheon City	Songgwang-myeon	National Route 18 overlap National Route 27 overlap
Gokcheon Bridge	곡천교		Suncheon City	Songgwang-myeon	National Route 18 overlap
Dolmen Park	고인돌공원		Suncheon City	Songgwang-myeon	National Route 18 overlap
Yongam IS (Juamho Sculpture Park) (Soh Jaipil Memorial Park)	용암삼거리 (주암호조각공원) (서재필기념공원)	National Route 18 (Songjae-ro)	Boseong County	Mundeok-myeon	National Route 18 overlap
Mundeok Bridge Juksan Bridge	문덕교 죽산교		Boseong County	Mundeok-myeon	
Daewonsa IS	대원사삼거리	Juksan-gil	Boseong County	Mundeok-myeon	
Bok Bridge	복교		Hwasun County	Nam-myeon	
Namgye IS	남계삼거리	Yuma-ro	Hwasun County	Nam-myeon	
Jusan 2 Bridge Jusan 1 Bridge Sasu 2 Bridge Sasu 1 Bridge Hapsumok Bridge	주산2교 주산1교 사수2교 사수1교 합수목교		Hwasun County	Nam-myeon	
Oenamcheon Bridge	외남천교	Saho-ro	Hwasun County	Nam-myeon	
Wonjin IS	원진 교차로	Prefectural Route 822 (Gimsatgat-ro)	Hwasun County	Nam-myeon	
Sapyeong Tunnel	사평터널		Hwasun County	Nam-myeon	Right tunnel: Approximately 350m Left tunnel: Approximately 330m
Byeoksong Bridge	벽송교		Hwasun County	Nam-myeon	
Byeoksong Overpass	벽송육교	Saho-ro	Hwasun County	Nam-myeon	
Guam IS	구암 교차로	National Route 22 (Hwasun-ro)	Hwasun County	Dong-myeon	National Route 22 overlap
Guam IS	구암삼거리	Chungui-ro	Hwasun County	Dong-myeon	National Route 22 overlap
Bokam IS	복암삼거리	Prefectural Route 897 (Gyubong-ro)	Hwasun County	Dong-myeon	National Route 22 overlap
Gyeongchi-ri IS	경치리 교차로	Jeokbyeong-ro	Hwasun County	Iseo-myeon	National Route 22 overlap
Yeonwol IS	연월 교차로	National Route 22 (Dongju-ro)	Hwasun County	Dongbok-myeon	National Route 22 overlap
Bongbok Bridge	동복교		Hwasun County	Dongbok-myeon	
Dongbok IS Dongbokhapdong Bus stop	동복삼거리 동복합동정류소	Prefectural Route 822 (Gimsatgat-ro); Cheonbyeon-gil	Hwasun County	Dongbok-myeon	
Dongbok Elementary School	동복초등학교		Hwasun County	Dongbok-myeon	
Cheonbyeon-ri IS	천변리 교차로	Ojiho-ro	Hwasun County	Dongbok-myeon	
Gyeongyeol Bridge	경열교		Hwasun County	Dongbok-myeon	
Dokjae Tunnel	독재터널		Hwasun County	Dongbok-myeon	Approximately 625m
Dokjae Tunnel			Hwasun County	Buk-myeon	Approximately 625m
Dagok IS	다곡삼거리	Muryeom-ro	Hwasun County	Buk-myeon	
Hwasun Bukmyeon Middle School	화순북면중학교		Hwasun County	Buk-myeon	
Icheon-ri IS	이천리 교차로	Hakcheon-gil	Hwasun County	Buk-myeon	
Wonri IS	원리삼거리	Wonri-gil	Hwasun County	Buk-myeon	
Wonri IS	원리사거리	Prefectural Route 887 (Baeka-ro); Wonri 1-gil	Hwasun County	Buk-myeon	
Gwaneumsa Entrance	관음사입구	Seongdeokgwaneum-gil	Gokseong County	Osan-myeon	
Simcheong Culture Center	심청문화센터		Gokseong County	Osan-myeon	
Dansa IS	단사삼거리	Sanijae-ro	Gokseong County	Osan-myeon	
Osan-myeon Office Osan Elementary School	오산면사무소 오산초등학교		Gokseong County	Osan-myeon	
Okgwa IC (Osan IS)	옥과 나들목 (오산 교차로)	Honam Expressway; National Route 13 (Oksun-ro)	Gokseong County	Osan-myeon	National Route 13 overlap
Osan IS	오산삼거리	Osan-ro	Gokseong County	Osan-myeon	National Route 13 overlap
Orye IS	오례삼거리	Prefectural Route 60 (Changpyeonghyeon-ro)	Damyang County	Mujeong-myeon	National Route 13 overlap
No name	(이름 없음)	Prefectural Route 887 (Pyeongjijeongseok-gil)	Damyang County	Mujeong-myeon	National Route 13 overlap Prefectural Route 887 overlap
Anpyeong Entrance	안평입구	Prefectural Route 897 (Byeongmong-ro)	Damyang County	Mujeong-myeon	National Route 13 overlap Prefectural Route 887 overlap
Mujeong-myeon Office	무정면사무소		Damyang County	Mujeong-myeon	National Route 13 overlap Prefectural Route 887 overlap
Damyang Police Station	담양경찰서		Damyang County	Damyang-eup	National Route 13 overlap Prefectural Route 887 overlap
Baekdong IS	백동사거리	National Route 24 (Jukhyangmunhwa-ro); National Route 29; Prefectural Route 55 (Jukhyang-daero)	Damyang County	Damyang-eup	National Route 13, National Route 24, National Route 29 overlap Prefectural Route 55, 887 overlap
Damyang-eup IS	담양읍삼거리	National Route 24; Prefectural Route 55 (Jukhyang-daero)	Damyang County	Damyang-eup	National Route 13, National Route 24, National Route 29 overlap Prefectural Route 55, 887 overlap
Dongun IS	동운삼거리	Jichim 6-gil	Damyang County	Damyang-eup	National Route 13, National Route 29 overlap Prefectural Route 887 overlap
Damyang Public Bus Terminal	담양공용버스터미널		Damyang County	Damyang-eup	National Route 13, National Route 29 overlap Prefectural Route 887 overlap
Jungpa IS	중파사거리	National Route 13; National Route 29; Prefectural Route 15; Prefectural Route 887 (Chuseong-ro)	Damyang County	Damyang-eup	Terminus; National Route 13, National Route 29 overlap Prefectural Route 15, 55, 887 overlap
