= Honam Expressway =

Expressway in South Korea

Expressway No.25
- Honam Expressway 호남고속도로

Route information
- Length: 207.2 km (128.7 mi)
- Existed: 1971–present

Major junctions
- South end: Suncheon, South Jeolla Province
- North end: Nonsan, South Chungcheong Province

Location
- Country: South Korea

Highway system
- Highway systems of South Korea; Expressways; National; Local

- Honam Expressway
- Hangul: 호남고속도로
- Hanja: 湖南高速道路
- RR: Honam gosok doro
- MR: Honam kosok toro

The Honam Expressway (Korean: 호남고속도로) is an expressway serving the Honam region in South Korea. The freeway connects Nonsan on the Nonsan-Cheonan Expressway and Honam Expressway Branch Line to Gwangju and Suncheon on the Namhae Expressway. The freeway's route number is 25. The Honam Expressway Branch is route number 251, and connects Nonsan on the Honam Expressway to Daejeon on the Gyeongbu Expressway.

== History ==
- April 15, 1970: Construction Begin
- December 30, 1970: Daejeon-Jeonju section (79.1 km) opened to traffic.
- November 14, 1973: Jeonju-Suncheon section (181.6 km) opened to traffic.
- June 1, 1978: Begins becoming charged.
- April 25, 1983: Work begins to widen to four lanes in Daejeon-Jeonju Section.
- June 30, 1986: The 4-lane expansion of the Daejeon–Jeonju section was completed.
- September 11, 1986: The 4-lane expansion of the Jeonju–Gwangju section was completed.
- September 1, 1989: The 4-lane expansion of the section in Gwangju (W.Gwangju IC-Goseo JCT) was completed.
- November 8, 1996: The 4-lane expansion of the Gwangju-Suncheon section was completed.
- January 1, 1999: West Jeonju Interchange (서전주IC) opened to traffic.
- August 25, 2001: Divides between Honam Expressway (Suncheon–Nonsan) to Honam Expressway Branch (Nonsan-Daejeon)
- August 31, 2002: Naejangsan IC (내장산IC) opened to traffic.
- December 29, 2004: Dongnim IC (동림IC) opened to traffic.
- May 15, 2007: Sanwol JCT (산월분기점) opened to traffic.
- December 17, 2009: The eight-lane expansion of the Munheung-Goseo section was completed and Munheung JCT (문흥분기점) opened to traffic.
- July 20, 2010: The six-lane expansion of the East Gwangju-Munheung section was completed.
- October 27, 2010: The six, eight-lane expansion of the Samnye-Nonsan section was completed.
- August 1, 2012: Motjae Tunnel (못재터널) opened to traffic.
- January 20, 2016: North Gwangsan Interchange (북광산IC) opened to traffic.
- December 20, 2022: South Jangseong Junction opened to traffic.
- February 20, 2023: Merged with Nonsan-Cheonan Expressway.
- October 24, 2024: North Jangseong Interchange opened to traffic.
- November 22, 2025: West Wanju Junction opened to traffic.

== Compositions ==
=== Lanes ===
- W. Suncheon IC–Goseo JC, E. Gwangju IC–Samnye IC: 4
- Munheung JC–E. Gwangju IC, Samnye IC–Iksan JC: 6
- Goseo JC–Munheung JC, Iksan JC–Nonsan JC: 8

=== Length ===
194.22 km

=== Speed limits ===
- 100 km/h

== List of facilities ==
- IC: Interchange, JC: Junction, SA: Service area, TG:Tollgate

No.	Name	Korean name	Hanja name	Connections	Notes	Location	
Connected directly with Namhae Expressway
	Suncheon	순천 시점	順天 始點	Namhae Expressway		Suncheon	Jeonnam
1	W. Suncheon IC	서순천나들목	西順天나들목	National Route 17		Suncheon	Jeonnam
SA	Suncheon SA	순천휴게소	順天休憩所		Suncheon-bound only	Suncheon	Jeonnam
2	Seungju IC	승주나들목	昇州나들목	National Route 22		Suncheon	Jeonnam
3	Songgwangsa·Juam IC	송광사·주암나들목	松廣寺·住岩나들목	National Route 18; National Route 27		Suncheon	Jeonnam
SA	Juam SA	주암휴게소	住岩休憩所			Suncheon	Jeonnam
4	Seokgok IC	석곡나들목	石谷나들목	National Route 27		Gokseong	Jeonnam
5	Gokseong IC	곡성나들목	谷城나들목	National Route 27		Gokseong	Jeonnam
SA	Gokseong Rail Village SA	곡성기차마을휴게소	谷城氣車마을休憩所			Gokseong	Jeonnam
6	Okgwa IC	옥과나들목	玉果나들목	National Route 13; National Route 15		Gokseong	Jeonnam
7	Daedeok JC	대덕분기점	大德分岐點	Gochang-Damyang Expressway	Suncheon-bound only	Damyang	Jeonnam
8	Changpyeong IC	창평나들목	昌平나들목	Local Route 60		Damyang	Jeonnam
9	Goseo JC	고서분기점	古西分岐點	Gwangju-Daegu Expressway		Damyang	Jeonnam
TG	E. Gwangju TG	동광주요금소	東光州料金所		Main Tollgate	Dong-gu	Gwangju
9-1	Munheung JC	문흥분기점	文興分岐點	Gwangju-Daegu Expressway; Gwangju Loop 2 National Route 29		Dong-gu	Gwangju
10	E. Gwangju IC	동광주나들목	東光州나들목	National Route 29	Cheonan-bound only	Dong-gu	Gwangju
11	Yongbong IC	용봉나들목	龍鳳나들목	Gwangju Biennale Museum	exit only	Dong-gu	Gwangju
12	W. Gwangju IC	서광주나들목	西光州나들목	National Route 1		Dong-gu	Gwangju
13	Dongnim IC	동림나들목	東林나들목	Bitgoeul-daero		Dong-gu	Gwangju
14	Sanwol JC	산월분기점	山月分岐點	Gwangju Loop 2 Muan-Gwangju Expressway(Indirect)		Gwangsan	Gwangju
15	Gwangsan IC	광산나들목	光山나들목	National Route 13		Gwangsan	Gwangju
15-1	N. Gwangsan IC	북광산나들목	北光山나들목	Jingok Indust. Compx. Highway		Jangseong	Jeonnam
TG	Gwangju TG	광주요금소	光州料金所		Main Tollgate	Jangseong	Jeonnam
15-2	S. Jangseong JC	남장성분기점	南長城分岐點	Gwangju Ring Expressway		Jangseong	Jeonnam
16	Jangseong IC	장성나들목	長城나들목	National Route 1 National Route 24		Jangseong	Jeonnam
17	Jangseong JC	장성분기점	長城分岐點	Gochang-Damyang Expressway		Jangseong	Jeonnam
SA	Baegyangsa SA	백양사휴게소	白羊寺休憩所			Jangseong	Jeonnam
18	Baegyangsa IC	백양사나들목	白羊寺나들목	Local Route 15		Jangseong	Jeonnam
TN	Honam TN	호남터널	湖南터널		Guard of Jeollanam-do and Jeollabuk-do	Jangseong	Jeonnam
19	Naejangsan IC	내장산나들목	內藏山나들목	Local Route 708		Jeongeup	Jeonbuk
20	Jeongeup IC	정읍나들목	井邑나들목	National Route 29		Jeongeup	Jeonbuk
SA	Jeongeup Nokdujanggun SA	정읍녹두장군휴게소	井邑綠豆將軍休憩所			Jeongeup	Jeonbuk
21	Taein IC	태인나들목	泰仁나들목	National Route 1		Jeongeup	Jeonbuk
22	Geumsansa IC	금산사나들목	金山寺나들목	Local Route 712		Gimje	Jeonbuk
23	Gimje IC	김제나들목	金堤나들목	Local Route 714		Gimje	Jeonbuk
SA	Iseo SA	이서휴게소	伊西休憩所			Wanju	Jeonbuk
23-1	W. Wanju JC			Saemangeum–Pohang Expressway		Wanju	Jeonbuk
	Iseo JC	이서분기점	伊西分岐點	Saemangeum–Pohang Expressway	(December 2025)	Wanju	Jeonbuk
24	W. Jeonju IC	서전주나들목	西全州나들목	Local Route 716		Wanju	Jeonbuk
25	Jeonju IC	전주나들목	全州나들목	National Route 26; National Route 1		Jeonju	Jeonbuk
26	Samnye IC	삼례나들목	參禮나들목	Local Route 799		Iksan	Jeonbuk
27	Iksan JC	익산분기점	益山分岐點	Iksan-Pohang Expressway; Suncheon-Wanju Expressway		Iksan	Jeonbuk
28	Iksan IC	익산나들목	益山나들목	Local Route 799		Wanju	Jeonbuk
SA	Iksan Mireuksaji SA	익산미륵사지휴게소	益山彌勒寺址休憩所			Iksan	Jeonbuk
29	Nonsan JC	논산분기점	論山分岐點	Honam Expressway Branch; Nonsan-Cheonan Expressway		Nonsan	Chungnam
Interchange numbered after 30 is belonged to Nonsan-Cheonan Expressway

=== Branch line (Nonsan-Daejeon) ===
- see Honam Expressway Branch
