= National Route 27 (South Korea) =

Road in South Korea

National Route 27
- 국도 제27호선

Route information
- Length: 287.5 km (178.6 mi)
- Existed: 22 February 1972–present

Major junctions
- South end: Wando County, South Jeolla Province
- North end: Jungang-ro 1-ga in Gunsan

Location
- Country: South Korea

Highway system
- Highway systems of South Korea; Expressways; National; Local
| ← National Route 26 | → National Route 28 |

National Route 27 is a national highway in South Korea that connects Wando County to Gunsan. It was established on 22 February 1972.

== History ==
On February 22, 1972, National Route 27 was established as the "Nokdong–Jeonju Line," connecting Nokdong, Doyang-myeon, Goheung County, Jeollanam-do, and Jeonju, Jeollabuk-do.

On March 14, 1981, the starting point was changed from "Nokdong, Doyang-myeon, Goheung County, Jeollanam-do" to "Doyang-eup, Goheung County, Jeollanam-do," and the terminus was extended from "Jeonju, Jeollabuk-do" to "Gunsan, Jeollabuk-do." Accordingly, it became the "Goheung–Gunsan Line."

On May 30, 1981, the road zone was changed to include the 39 km section extended under the amendment of Presidential Decree No. 10247, General National Route Designation Act.

From 1993 to 1994, expansions into Goheung occurred. The 4.06 km Goheung Bypass Road (Deungam-ri–Namgye-ri, Goheung-eup, Goheung County) opened. Then, on July 14, 1994, the starting point was extended about 18.9 km from Bongam-ri, Doyang-eup, Goheung County to Ocheon-ri, Geumsan-myeon, Goheung County. To reflect this, on July 19, 1996, the section from Geogeumdo, Geumsan-myeon, Goheung County to Doyang-eup, Goheung County was designated as the "Nationally Supported Local Route 27 Goheung–Nokdong Line."

From December 1997 to October 2004, may expansions occurred. The Geogeumdo Ring Road (Ocheon-ri–Eojeon-ri, Geumsan-myeon, Goheung County) was widened and paved. In 1997, an 11.1 km road zone was changed. This road was changed again in 2001. In 2001, an 800 m road zone was changed to improve the road. Additionally, the Sunchang Bypass Road (Ganam-ri–Sunhwa-ri, Sunchang-eup, Sunchang County) opened in 1997.

There were two expansions in December 2000. First, the 1.78 km section of the Yeonban District hazardous road (Yeonban-ri, Seokgok-myeon, Gokseong County) was improved and opened; the existing 700 m section was abolished. Later that month, the 11.5 km Samnye–Iri Road (Samnye-ri, Samnye-eup, Wanju County–Dongsan-dong, Iksan City) was widened and opened.

By incorporating the section of Nationally Supported Local Route 27, the starting point was extended from "Doyang-eup, Goheung County, Jeollanam-do" to "Geumsan-myeon, Goheung County, Jeollanam-do" in August 2001.

In 2005, the 9.36 km section from Baegyeo-ri to Hangga-ri, Gui-myeon, Wanju County was designated as a motorway.

In 2006, the 12.452 km section from Songhak-ri, Osan-myeon, Iksan City to Chango-ri, Seongsan-myeon, Gunsan City and the 5.91 km section from Chango-ri, Seongsan-myeon, Gunsan City to Guam-dong opened.

In September 2007, there was a partial opening of a 9.8 km section from Bongam-ri, Doyang-eup, Goheung County to Gook-ri, Pungyang-myeon, Goheung County, and a 9.1 km section from Gook-ri, Pungyang-myeon to Namgye-ri, Goheung-eup, Goheung County. These fully opened in December of the same year. As such, the existing 8.0 km section connecting these areas was abolished.

In December 2008, the 20.2 km Gui–Yongjeong Road (Wondang-dong, Wansan-gu, Jeonju–Yongjeong-dong, Deokjin-gu, Jeonju) opened.

In 2009, the 25 km Sunchang–Unam Road (Doryong-ri, In계-myeon, Sunchang County–Baegyeo-ri, Gui-myeon, Wanju County) was designated as a motorway, and the 4.218 km Sorok Bridge (Sorok-ri–Yongjeong-ri, Doyang-eup, Goheung County) opened.

In 2010, the 1.0 km Section 4 of the Sunchang–Unam Road (Baegyeo-ri, Gui-myeon, Wanju County) opened.

In December 2010, a 2.0 km section from Yongjeong-dong, Deokjin-gu, Jeonju to Haejeon-ri, Samnye-eup, Wanju County, and A 3.7 km section from Pyeongjang-ri, Gyeom-myeon, Gokseong County to Jusan-ri, Okgwa-myeon were widened and opened, abolishing the existing 8.1 km and 2.17 km sections connecting those areas.

In December 2011, the 6.67 km section from Daeheung-ri, Geumsan-myeon, Goheung County to Sorok-ri, Doyang-eup, Goheung County, including the Geogeum Bridge, opened. The existing 1.6 km section in Sinchon-ri, Geumsan-myeon, Goheung County was abolished.

In 2012, the 24 km Sunchang–Unam Road (Doryong-ri, In계-myeon, Sunchang County–Baegyeo-ri, Gui-myeon, Wanju County) was widened and opened. Due to the opening of this new road, the existing 25.266 km section from Doryong-ri, In계-myeon, Sunchang County to Maam-ri, Unam-myeon, Imsil County and a 2.84 km section from Maam-ri, Unam-myeon, Imsil County to Baegyeo-ri, Gui-myeon, Wanju County were abolished. was abolished. Also, the 7 km Sunchang IC–Jusan-ri Road (Ganam-ri, Sunchang-eup, Sunchang County–Jusan-ri, Okgwa-myeon, Gokseong County) was widened and opened, with the existing section abolished.

In 2016, the Sections 1 and 2 of the Beolgyo–Juam Road (Goeup-ri, Beolgyo-eup, Boseong County–Geumseong-ri, Oeseo-myeon, Suncheon City) opened after widening, abolishing the existing 12.04 km and 5.7 km sections.

In June 2021, the starting point was extended from Ocheon-ri, Geumsan-myeon, Goheung County, Jeollanam-do to Deogam-ri, Gogum-myeon, Wando County, Jeollanam-do. Accordingly, the route changed from "Goheung–Gunsan Line" to "Wando–Gunsan Line." The section from Ocheon Port to Sinjeon-ri, Geumsan-myeon, Goheung County, Jeollanam-do was de-designated.

== Main stopovers ==
South Jeolla Province

- Goheung County - Boseong County - Suncheon - Gokseong County

North Jeolla Province

- Sunchang County - Imsil County - Wanju County (Gui-myeon)- Jeonju (Wansan-gu) - Wanju County (Iseo-myeon) - Jeonju (Wansan-gu) - Wanju County (Iseo-myeon) - Jeonju (Deokjin-gu) - Wanju County (Samrye-eup) - Iksan - Gunsan

== Major intersections ==
- (■): Motorway

IS: Intersection, IC: Interchange

=== South Jeolla Province ===
| Name | Hangul name | Connection | Location | | Note |
|---|---|---|---|---|---|
| Ocheon Port | 오천항 | Geogeumilju-ro | Goheung County | Geumsan-myeon | Terminus |
| Naedong IS | 내동삼거리 | Ocheonmulmannae-gil | Goheung County | Geumsan-myeon | |
| Geumjang IS | 금장삼거리 | Geumjang-gil | Goheung County | Geumsan-myeon | |
| No name | (이름 없음) | Geumseong-gil | Goheung County | Geumsan-myeon | |
| Sangdong IS | 상동사거리 | Geumjang-gil; Seoksan-gil | Goheung County | Geumsan-myeon | |
| Ikgeum IS | 익금삼거리 | Ikgeumhaebyeon-gil | Goheung County | Geumsan-myeon | |
| Gonggoji IS | 공고지삼거리 | | Goheung County | Geumsan-myeon | |
| Ongryong IS | 옥룡삼거리 | Ongnyongmaeul-gil | Goheung County | Geumsan-myeon | |
| Yeonso IS | 연소삼거리 | Yeonsowit-gil | Goheung County | Geumsan-myeon | |
| Pyeongji IS | 평지삼거리 | Soemeori-gil | Goheung County | Geumsan-myeon | |
| Jungchon IS | 중촌삼거리 | Prefectural Route 830 (Daesin-ro) | Goheung County | Geumsan-myeon | Prefectural Route 830 overlap |
| Daeheung Rotary IS | 대흥 회전교차로 | Doncheong-gil | Goheung County | Geumsan-myeon | Prefectural Route 830 overlap |
| Sinchon Rotary IS | 신촌 회전교차로 | Geogeumilju-ro | Goheung County | Geumsan-myeon | Prefectural Route 830 overlap |
| Geumjin Tunnel | 금진터널 | | Goheung County | Geumsan-myeon | Prefectural Route 830 overlap Approximately 235m |
| Geumjin IS | 금진 교차로 | Geogeumilju-ro; Pyeongjeon-gil | Goheung County | Geumsan-myeon | Prefectural Route 830 overlap |
| Geogeum Bridge | 거금대교 | | Goheung County | Geumsan-myeon | Prefectural Route 830 overlap Approximately 2028m |
| Geogeum Bridge | | | Goheung County | Doyang-eup | Prefectural Route 830 overlap Approximately 2028m |
| Sorok Tunnel | 소록터널 | | Goheung County | Doyang-eup | Prefectural Route 830 overlap Approximately 395m |
| Sorok IS | 소록삼거리 | Sorokseonchang-gil; Sorokhaean-gil | Goheung County | Doyang-eup | Prefectural Route 830 overlap |
| Sorok Bridge Sorok Bridge (Cross-sea bridge) | 소록교 소록대교 | | Goheung County | Doyang-eup | Prefectural Route 830 overlap |
| Nokdong 2 IS | 녹동2 교차로 | Prefectural Route 830 (Doyanghaean-ro); Mokneomganeun-gil | Goheung County | Doyang-eup | Prefectural Route 830 overlap |
| Nokdong Bridge | 녹동교 | | Goheung County | Doyang-eup | Prefectural Route 830 overlap |
| Nokdong 2 IS | 녹동2 교차로 | Prefectural Route 830 (Doyanghaean-ro); Mokneomganeun-gil | Goheung County | Doyang-eup | Prefectural Route 830 overlap |
| Yongjeong Bridge | 용정교 | | Goheung County | Doyang-eup | |
| Yongjeong IS (Chagyeong IS) | 용정 교차로 (차경사거리) | National Route 77 (Ujuhanggong-ro); Chagyeonggureongmok-gil | Goheung County | Doyang-eup | National Route 77 overlap |
| Sangyu IS | 상유삼거리 | Goheung-ro | Goheung County | Doyang-eup | National Route 77 overlap |
| Dochon IS | 도촌 교차로 | Goheung-ro; Dochon-gil | Goheung County | Dodeok-myeon | National Route 77 overlap |
| Dodeok IS | 도덕 교차로 | Goheung-ro | Goheung County | Dodeok-myeon | National Route 77 overlap |
| Sinyang Bridge | 신양교 | | Goheung County | Dodeok-myeon | National Route 77 overlap |
| Dangdu IS | 당두 교차로 | Gongho-gil | Goheung County | Pungyang-myeon | National Route 77 overlap |
| Pungyang IS | 풍양 교차로 | Hosan-ro | Goheung County | Pungyang-myeon | National Route 77 overlap |
| Bocheon 1 Bridge Bocheon 2 Bridge | 보천1교 보천2교 | | Goheung County | Pungyang-myeon | National Route 77 overlap |
| Sangrim IS | 상림 교차로 | Prefectural Route 851 (Goheung-ro) | Goheung County | Pungyang-myeon | National Route 77 overlap |
| Deungam IS | 등암 교차로 | Goheung-ro | Goheung County | Goheung-eup | National Route 77 overlap |
| Bonggye IS | 봉계 교차로 | Bonggye 2-gil | Goheung County | Goheung-eup | National Route 77 overlap |
| Hohyeong IS | 호형 교차로 | National Route 15; Prefectural Route 15 (Uju-ro); Bongdongjugong-gil | Goheung County | Goheung-eup | National Route 77 overlap |
| Hohyeong Bridge | 호형교 | | Goheung County | Goheung-eup | National Route 77 overlap |
| Hohyeong IS | 호형 교차로 | National Route 15; Prefectural Route 15 (Uju-ro); Hakgyo-gil | Goheung County | Goheung-eup | National Route 15, National Route 77 overlap Prefectural Route 15 overlap |
| Namgye IS | 남계 교차로 | Goheung-ro | Goheung County | Goheung-eup | National Route 15, National Route 77 overlap Prefectural Route 15 overlap |
| Jideung IS | 지등 교차로 | Goheung-ro | Goheung County | Duwon-myeon | National Route 15, National Route 77 overlap Prefectural Route 15 overlap |
| Janghang Bridge | 장항교 | | Goheung County | Duwon-myeon | National Route 15, National Route 77 overlap Prefectural Route 15 overlap |
| Undae IS | 운대 교차로 | Prefectural Route 830 (Duwonunseok-gil); Goheung-ro; Geumo-gil | Goheung County | Duwon-myeon | National Route 15, National Route 77 overlap Prefectural Route 15 overlap |
| Sinan IS | 신안 교차로 | Goheung-ro | Goheung County | Jeomam-myeon | National Route 15, National Route 77 overlap Prefectural Route 15 overlap |
| Yeonbong IS | 연봉 교차로 | Prefectural Route 855 (Haechang-ro); Goheung-ro | Goheung County | Jeomam-myeon | National Route 15, National Route 77 overlap Prefectural Route 15 overlap |
| Sajeong Overpass | 사정육교 | | Goheung County | Jeomam-myeon | National Route 15, National Route 77 overlap Prefectural Route 15 overlap |
| Seokbong IS | 석봉 교차로 | Gwayeok-ro | Goheung County | Gwayeok-myeon | National Route 15, National Route 77 overlap Prefectural Route 15 overlap |
| Gwayeok IS | 과역 교차로 | Goheung-ro | Goheung County | Gwayeok-myeon | National Route 15, National Route 77 overlap Prefectural Route 15 overlap |
| Nosong IS | 노송 교차로 | Goheung-ro; Gwayeok-ro | Goheung County | Gwayeok-myeon | National Route 15, National Route 77 overlap Prefectural Route 15 overlap |
| Namyang IS | 남양 교차로 | Goheung-ro; Namyang-ro; Namnyanghuimang-gil | Goheung County | Namyang-myeon | National Route 15, National Route 77 overlap Prefectural Route 15 overlap |
| Tanpo IS | 탄포 교차로 | National Route 77 (Goheung-ro); Apyeong-gil; Ungyojugok-gil | Goheung County | Namyang-myeon | National Route 15, National Route 77 overlap Prefectural Route 15 overlap |
| Gyemae IS | 계매 교차로 | Goheung-ro; Ondong-gil | Goheung County | Donggang-myeon | National Route 15 overlap Prefectural Route 15 overlap |
| Yudun 2 Bridge | 유둔2교 | | Goheung County | Donggang-myeon | National Route 15 overlap Prefectural Route 15 overlap |
| Donggang IS | 동강 교차로 | Dongseo-ro; Donggangjungchon-gil | Goheung County | Donggang-myeon | National Route 15 overlap Prefectural Route 15 overlap |
| Maegok Bridge | 매곡교 | | Goheung County | Donggang-myeon | National Route 15 overlap Prefectural Route 15 overlap |
| Maegok IS | 매곡 교차로 | Goheung-ro; Donggangsinjeong-gil | Goheung County | Donggang-myeon | National Route 15 overlap Prefectural Route 15 overlap |
| Jangdeok IS | 장덕 교차로 | Goheung-ro | Goheung County | Donggang-myeon | National Route 15 overlap Prefectural Route 15 overlap |
| Hancheon IS | 한천 교차로 | Goheung-ro (Namhae Expressway) | Goheung County | Donggang-myeon | National Route 15 overlap Prefectural Route 15 overlap Connect with Goheung IC |
| Anjeong Bridge | 안정교 | | Boseong County | Beolgyo-eup | National Route 15 overlap Prefectural Route 15 overlap |
| Beolgyo IS | 벌교 교차로 | National Route 2 Prefectural Route 843 (Noksaek-ro) | Boseong County | Beolgyo-eup | National Route 15 overlap Prefectural Route 15 overlap |
| Beolgyo Tunnel | 벌교터널 | | Boseong County | Beolgyo-eup | National Route 15 overlap Prefectural Route 15 overlap Approximately 745m |
| Jeondong IS | 전동 교차로 | Chaedongseon-ro | Boseong County | Beolgyo-eup | National Route 15 overlap Prefectural Route 15 overlap |
| Goeup IS | 고읍 교차로 | Chaedongseon-ro | Boseong County | Beolgyo-eup | National Route 15 overlap Prefectural Route 15 overlap |
| Nakseong IS | 낙성 교차로 | Chaedongseon-ro; Beolgyojungheung-gil; Beolgyojidong-gil | Boseong County | Beolgyo-eup | National Route 15 overlap Prefectural Route 15 overlap |
| Seokgeorijae Tunnel | 석거리재터널 | | Boseong County | Beolgyo-eup | National Route 15 overlap Prefectural Route 15 overlap Approximately 520m |
| Seokgeorijae Tunnel | | | Suncheon City | Oeseo-myeon | National Route 15 overlap Prefectural Route 15 overlap Approximately 520m |
| Oeseo IS | 외서 교차로 | Prefectural Route 58 (Ssanghyangsu-gil) | Suncheon City | Oeseo-myeon | National Route 15 overlap Prefectural Route 15 overlap |
| Ssangyul IS | 쌍율 교차로 | Ssangyul-gil; Ssanghyangsu-gil | Suncheon City | Oeseo-myeon | National Route 15 overlap Prefectural Route 15 overlap |
| Guryong IS | 구룡 교차로 | Ssanghyangsu-gil | Suncheon City | Songgwang-myeon | National Route 15 overlap Prefectural Route 15 overlap |
| Ieup IS | 이읍 교차로 | Ssanghyangsu-gil | Suncheon City | Songgwang-myeon | National Route 15 overlap Prefectural Route 15 overlap |
| Songgwang-myeon Office | 송광면사무소 | | Suncheon City | Songgwang-myeon | National Route 15 overlap Prefectural Route 15 overlap |
| Gokcheon IS | 곡천삼거리 | National Route 15; National Route 18; Prefectural Route 15 (Songgwangsa-gil) | Suncheon City | Songgwang-myeon | National Route 15 overlap National Route 18 overlap Prefectural Route 15 overlap |
| Songgwang Bus Terminal | 송광정류장 | | Suncheon City | Songgwang-myeon | National Route 18 overlap |
| (Pyeongchon) | (평촌) | Prefectural Route 897 (Hugok-gil) | Suncheon City | Songgwang-myeon | National Route 18 overlap Prefectural Route 897 overlap |
| Songgwangsa IS | 송광사삼거리 | Prefectural Route 897 (Songgwangsaan-gil) | Suncheon City | Songgwang-myeon | National Route 18 overlap Prefectural Route 897 overlap |
| Pine Hills Country Club | 파인힐스CC | | Suncheon City | Juam-myeon | National Route 18 overlap |
| Mungil IS | 문길삼거리 | National Route 18; National Route 22 (Dongju-ro) | Suncheon City | Juam-myeon | National Route 18 overlap National Route 22 overlap |
| Juam IC | 주암 나들목 | Honam Expressway | Suncheon City | Juam-myeon | National Route 22 overlap |
| Juam Elementary School | 주암초등학교 | | Suncheon City | Juam-myeon | National Route 22 overlap |
| Gunsan IS | 구산삼거리 | Gusangangbyeon-gil | Suncheon City | Juam-myeon | National Route 22 overlap |
| Gwangcheon Bridge | 광천교 | | Suncheon City | Juam-myeon | National Route 22 overlap |
| Juam IS | 주암사거리 | National Route 22 (Dongju-ro) | Suncheon City | Juam-myeon | National Route 22 overlap |
| Gwangcheonso Bridge | 광천소교 | | Suncheon City | Juam-myeon | |
| Juam Agricultural and Industrial Complex | 주암농공단지 | | Suncheon City | Juam-myeon | |
| Seokgok IC | 석곡 나들목 | Honam Expressway | Gokseong County | Seokgok-myeon | |
| Seokgok IS (Seokgok Middle School) | 석곡 교차로 (석곡중학교) | Seokgok-ro | Gokseong County | Seokgok-myeon | |
| Juksan Village Entrance | 죽산마을입구 | Nochi-ro; Juksan-gil | Gokseong County | Seokgok-myeon | |
| Neungpa IS | 능파사거리 | Daehwanggang-ro; Seokgok-ro | Gokseong County | Seokgok-myeon | |
| Seokgok Agricultural Complex | 석곡농공단지 | | Gokseong County | Seokgok-myeon | |
| Baekcheon Bridge | 백천교 | | Gokseong County | Seokgok-myeon | |
| Samgi IS | 삼기삼거리 | Prefectural Route 60 (Gokseong-ro) | Gokseong County | Samgi-myeon | Prefectural Route 60 overlap |
| Gokseong IC | 곡성 나들목 | Honam Expressway | Gokseong County | Samgi-myeon | Prefectural Route 60 overlap |
| Samgi-myeon Office Samgi Elementary School | 삼기면사무소 삼기초등학교 | | Gokseong County | Samgi-myeon | Prefectural Route 60 overlap |
| Heungbok IS | 흥복삼거리 | Sanijae-ro | Gokseong County | Gyeom-myeon | Prefectural Route 60 overlap |
| Gyeom-myeon Office Gyeom-myeon Elementary School (Closed) | 겸면사무소 겸면초등학교(폐교) | | Gokseong County | Gyeom-myeon | Prefectural Route 60 overlap |
| Pyeongjang IS | 평장삼거리 | National Route 13; Prefectural Route 60 (Oksun-ro) | Gokseong County | Gyeom-myeon | National Route 13 overlap Prefectural Route 60 overlap |
| Muchang IS | 무창 교차로 | National Route 13 (Immyeon-ro) | Gokseong County | Okgwa-myeon | National Route 13 overlap |
| Okgwacheon Bridge | 옥과천교 | | Gokseong County | Okgwa-myeon | |
| Jusan IS | 주산 교차로 | Baegam-gil | Gokseong County | Okgwa-myeon | |
| Uchigogae Underpass | 우치고개지하차도 | | Gokseong County | Okgwa-myeon | Continuation into North Jeolla Province |

=== North Jeolla Province ===
| Name | Hangul name | Connection | Location | | Note |
|---|---|---|---|---|---|
| Uchigogae Underpass | 우치고개지하차도 | | Sunchang County | Pungsan-myeon | South Jeolla Province - North Jeolla Province border line |
| Deoksan IS | 덕산 교차로 | Pungsan-ro | Sunchang County | Pungsan-myeon | |
| Pungsan IS | 풍산 교차로 | Prefectural Route 730 (Geumpung-ro) | Sunchang County | Pungsan-myeon | Prefectural Route 730 overlap |
| Daejeong IS | 대정 교차로 | Goksun-ro | Sunchang County | Sunchang-eup | Prefectural Route 730 overlap |
| Ganam Agricultural and Industrial Complex | 가남농공단지 | | Sunchang County | Sunchang-eup | Prefectural Route 730 overlap |
| Sunchang IC (Sunchangnam IS) (Sunchangbuk IS) | 순창 나들목 (순창남 교차로) (순창북 교차로) | Gwangju–Daegu Expressway | Sunchang County | Sunchang-eup | Prefectural Route 730 overlap |
| Sunchang IS | 순창삼거리 | Sunchang-ro | Sunchang County | Sunchang-eup | Prefectural Route 730 overlap |
| Yudeung IS | 유등사거리 | Prefectural Route 730 (Yudeung-ro); Sunchang 6-gil | Sunchang County | Sunchang-eup | Prefectural Route 730 overlap |
| Eunhaeng IS | 은행삼거리 | Jangnyu-ro | Sunchang County | Sunchang-eup | |
| Jeilgo IS (Sunchang Jeil High School) | 제일고삼거리 (순창제일고등학교) | National Route 24 (Damsun-ro) | Sunchang County | Sunchang-eup | National Route 24 overlap |
| Gwanseo IS | 관서삼거리 | Sunchang-ro | Sunchang County | Sunchang-eup | National Route 24 overlap |
| Sunchang High School IS | 순창고교 교차로 | National Route 24; Prefectural Route 729 (Damsun-ro); Okcheon-ro | Sunchang County | Sunchang-eup | National Route 24 overlap Prefectural Route 729 overlap |
| Singi IS | 신기 교차로 | Prefectural Route 729 (Gwangam-ro) | Sunchang County | Sunchang-eup | Prefectural Route 729 overlap |
| Boksil IS | 복실 교차로 | Indeok-ro | Sunchang County | Sunchang-eup | |
| Ingye IS | 인계 교차로 | National Route 21 (Inseong-ro) | Sunchang County | Ingye-myeon | |
| Ssangam IS | 쌍암 교차로 | Anjeong-ro | Sunchang County | Ingye-myeon | |
| Jangam IS | 장암 교차로 | Indeok-ro | Imsil County | Deokchi-myeon | |
| Dumu Tunnel | 두무터널 | | Imsil County | Deokchi-myeon | Right tunnel: Approximately 690m Left tunnel: Approximately 722m |
| Deokchi Tunnel | 덕치터널 | | Imsil County | Deokchi-myeon | Approximately 95m |
| Deokchi IS | 덕치 교차로 | Indeok-ro | Imsil County | Deokchi-myeon | National Route 30 overlap |
| Seomjin River Bridge | 섬진강교 | | Imsil County | Deokchi-myeon | |
| Seomjin River Bridge | | | Imsil County | Gangjin-myeon | |
| Odumok Bridge | 오두목교 | | Imsil County | Gangjin-myeon | |
| Gangjinpilbong Tunnel | 강진필봉터널 | | Imsil County | Gangjin-myeon | Approximately 540m |
| Pilbong IS | 필봉 교차로 | Gangul-ro; Pilbonggut-gil | Imsil County | Gangjin-myeon | |
| Hakseok IS | 학석 교차로 | Gangul-ro; Hakseok 1-gil | Imsil County | Gangjin-myeon | |
| Bamjae Tunnel | 밤재터널 | | Imsil County | Gangjin-myeon | Right tunnel: Approximately 500m Left tunnel: Approximately 480m |
| Bamjae Tunnel | | | Imsil County | Unam-myeon | Right tunnel: Approximately 500m Left tunnel: Approximately 480m |
| Mosiul IS | 모시울 교차로 | Prefectural Route 717 (Gangul-ro) | Imsil County | Unam-myeon | Prefectural Route 717 overlap |
| Unam Tunnel | 운암터널 | | Imsil County | Unam-myeon | Prefectural Route 717 overlap Right tunnel: Approximately 1,105m Left tunnel: Approximately 1,120m |
| Unjong IS | 운종 교차로 | Prefectural Route 717 (Unjong-gil) | Imsil County | Unam-myeon | Prefectural Route 717 overlap |
| Unam Bridge | 운암대교 | | Imsil County | Unam-myeon | |
| Unam Bridge | | | Wanju County | Gui-myeon | |
| Saeteo IS | 새터 교차로 | Gui-ro | Wanju County | Gui-myeon | |
| Sangyong IS | 상용 교차로 | Prefectural Route 49; Prefectural Route 55 (Jeongeupwanjugan-doro) | Wanju County | Gui-myeon | Prefectural Route 49, 55 overlap |
| Baekyeo IS | 백여 교차로 | Prefectural Route 49; Prefectural Route 55 (Gui-ro) | Wanju County | Gui-myeon | Prefectural Route 49, 55 overlap |
| Daedeok IS | 대덕 교차로 | Prefectural Route 714 (Gyean-ro) | Wanju County | Gui-myeon | |
| Gyegok Tunnel | 계곡터널 | | Wanju County | Gui-myeon | Approximately 290m |
| Gyodong IS | 교동 교차로 | Gui-ro | Wanju County | Gui-myeon | |
| Hangga IS | 항가 교차로 | Hanggabanwol-gil | Wanju County | Gui-myeon | |
| Moak IS | 모악 교차로 | Moaksan-gil | Wanju County | Gui-myeon | |
| Moak Tunnel | 모악터널 | | Wanju County | Gui-myeon | Approximately 325m |
| Wondang IS | 원당 교차로 | Moak-ro; Moaksanjarak-gil | Jeonju City | Wansan District | |
| Gui IS | 구이 교차로 | National Route 21 (Honam-ro) | Jeonju City | Wansan District | National Route 21 overlap |
| Jungin IS | 중인 교차로 | Prefectural Route 712 (Urim-ro) | Jeonju City | Wansan District | National Route 21 overlap |
| Ssukgogae IS | 쑥고개 교차로 | National Route 1 National Route 21 (Ssukgogae-ro) | Jeonju City | Wansan District | National Route 1 overlap National Route 21 overlap |
| Iseo IS | 이서 교차로 | Prefectural Route 716 (Kongjwipatjwi-ro) | Wanju County | Iseo-myeon | National Route 1 overlap |
| Daeheung IS | 대흥 교차로 | National Route 21; National Route 26 (Beonyeong-ro) | Jeonju City | Deokjin District | National Route 1 overlap |
| Yongjeong IS | 용정 분기점 | National Route 21 (Saemangeumbuk-ro) | Jeonju City | Deokjin District | National Route 1 overlap |
| Mangyeong River Bridge | 만경강교 | | Jeonju City | Deokjin District | National Route 1 overlap |
| Mangyeong River Bridge | | | Wanju County | Samnye-eup | National Route 1 overlap |
| Haejeon Junction Haejeon IS | 해전 분기점 해전 교차로 | National Route 1 (Honam-ro); Pyeongdong-ro | Wanju County | Samnye-eup | National Route 1 overlap |
| Junghaejeon IS | 중해전 교차로 | Chunpo-ro | Wanju County | Samnye-eup | |
| Iksan Bridge | 익산교 | | Iksan City | Chunpo-myeon | |
| Yongyeon IS | 용연 교차로 | Chunpo-ro | Iksan City | Chunpo-myeon | |
| Chunpo IS | 춘포 교차로 | Chunpo 3-gil | Iksan City | Chunpo-myeon | |
| Deoksil IS | 덕실 교차로 | Chunpo-ro; Deoksil-gil | Iksan City | Chunpo-myeon | |
| Sinpyeong IS | 신평 교차로 | Chunpo-ro; Deoksil 1-gil | Iksan City | Chunpo-myeon | |
| Singeumgang Bridge | 신 금강교 | | Iksan City | Chunpo-myeon | |
| Singeumgang Bridge | | | Iksan City | Dongsan-dong | |
| Geumgang IS | 금강 교차로 | Chunpo-ro; Hana-ro | Iksan City | Dongsan-dong | |
| Dongiksan IS | 동익산사거리 | Seodong-ro | Iksan City | Inhwa-dong | |
| Deunggiso IS | 등기소사거리 | Juhyeon-ro; Mokcheon-ro 13-gil | Iksan City | Inhwa-dong | |
| Inhwa IS | 인화사거리 | Inbuk-ro | Iksan City | Inhwa-dong | |
| Pyeonghwa IS | 평화사거리 | Iksan-daero; Pyeongdong-ro | Iksan City | Pyeonghwa-dong | |
| Pyeonghwa IS | 평화삼거리 | Iksan-daero | Iksan City | Pyeonghwa-dong | |
| Iri Songhak Elementary School | 이리송학초등학교 | | Iksan City | Songhak-dong | |
| No name | (이름 없음) | Hakgon-ro | Iksan City | Songhak-dong | |
| Songhak-dong Community Centre | 송학동주민센터 | | Iksan City | Songhak-dong | |
| Songhak IS | 송학사거리 | Gohyeon-ro; Gunik-ro | Iksan City | Songhak-dong | |
| Songhak IS | 송학 교차로 | National Route 23 (Muwang-ro) | Iksan City | Osan-myeon | National Route 23 overlap |
| (Oegeom) | (외검) | Hangjaeng-ro | Iksan City | Osan-myeon | National Route 23 overlap |
| Jangsin IS | 장신 교차로 | Osan-ro | Iksan City | Osan-myeon | National Route 23 overlap |
| Yeongman Bridge Cheongsu Bridge | 영만교 청수교 | | Iksan City | Osan-myeon | National Route 23 overlap |
| Yeongman IS | 영만 교차로 | National Route 23 (Seobu-ro) | Iksan City | Osan-myeon | National Route 23 overlap |
| Yeongchang Bridge | 영창교 | | Gunsan City | Seosu-myeon | |
| Seosu IS | 서수 교차로 | Prefectural Route 718 (Tapcheon-ro) | Gunsan City | Seosu-myeon | |
| Gyenam IS | 계남 교차로 | Prefectural Route 711 (Donggunsan-ro) | Gunsan City | Impi-myeon | Prefectural Route 711 overlap |
| Impi IS | 임피 교차로 | Prefectural Route 711 (Haman-ro) | Gunsan City | Impi-myeon | Prefectural Route 711 overlap |
| Chango IS | 창오 교차로 | Donggunsan-ro | Gunsan City | Seongsan-myeon | |
| Wadong IS | 와동 교차로 | Asan 1-gil | Gunsan City | Seongsan-myeon | |
| Gobong IS | 고봉 교차로 | Prefectural Route 706 (Guam-ro) | Gunsan City | Seongsan-myeon | Connect with Gunsan IC |
| Hodeok IS | 호덕 교차로 | National Route 21; National Route 29 (Geumgang-ro) | Gunsan City | Gaejeong-myeon | National Route 21 overlap |
| Guam IS | 구암삼거리 | Guam 3.1-ro | Gunsan City | Guam-dong | National Route 21 overlap |
| Jamdu IS | 잠두삼거리 | Baekreung-ro | Gunsan City | Guam-dong | National Route 21 overlap |
| Guam Bridge IS | 구암교삼거리 | Guam 3.1-ro | Gunsan City | Guam-dong | National Route 21 overlap |
| Yeonan IS | 연안사거리 | Jochon-ro | Gunsan City | Gyeongam-dong | National Route 21 overlap |
| Jinpo IS | 진포사거리 | Jinpo-ro | Gunsan City | Gyeongam-dong | National Route 21 overlap |
| Gyeongam IS | 경암사거리 | Haemang-ro | Gunsan City | Gyeongam-dong | National Route 21 overlap |
| Gyeonguhoeap | 경우회앞 | Jukseong-ro | Gunsan City | Jungang-dong | National Route 21 overlap |
| Naehang IS | 내항사거리 | National Route 21; National Route 26 (Haemang-ro) | Gunsan City | Wolmyeong-dong | National Route 21 overlap National Route 26 overlap |
| Jungang IS | 중앙사거리 | National Route 26 (Jungang-ro); Daehak-ro | Gunsan City | Wolmyeong-dong | National Route 26 overlap Terminus |
