= National Route 18 (South Korea) =

Road in South Korea

National Route 18
- 국도 제18호선

Route information
- Length: 282.6 km (175.6 mi)
- Existed: 14 August 1981–present

Major junctions
- West end: Jindo County, South Jeolla Province
- East end: Gurye County, South Jeolla Province

Location
- Country: South Korea

Highway system
- Highway systems of South Korea; Expressways; National; Local
| ← National Route 17 | → National Route 19 |

National Route 18 is a national highway in South Korea connects Jindo County to Gurye County. It established on 14 August 1981.

== History ==
- March 14, 1981: National Route 18 Jindo ~ Gurye Line newly established
- May 30, 1981: Road zone determined for newly established 187 km section according to the amendment of Presidential Decree No. 10247 General National Highway Route Designation Decree
- August 17, 1981: Paengmok-ri, Imhoe-myeon, Jindo-gun ~ Seongnae-ri, Haenam-eup, Haenam-gun 73.993 km section, Yeongchun-ri, Okcheon-myeon, Haenam-gun ~ Seoseong-ri, Gangjin-eup, Gangjin-gun 16.038 km section, Geonsan-ri, Jangheung-eup, Jangheung-gun ~ Wolsan-ri, Songgwang-myeon, Seungju-gun 67.752 km section, Seokgok-ri, Seokgok-myeon ~ Amnok-ri, Ogok-myeon, Gokseong-gun 16.702 km section, Yongnim-ri, Hwangjeon-myeon, Seungju-gun ~ Bongdong-ri, Gurye-eup, Gurye-gun 6.476 km section, Naengcheon-ri ~ Hwangjeon-ri, Masan-myeon, Gurye-gun 6.128 km section upgraded to national highway opened
- January 18, 1994: Hwangsan Bypass Road (Nami-ri ~ Uhang-ri, Hwangsan-myeon, Haenam-gun) 2.34 km section expansion opening
- April 14, 1998: Jeongja Bridge (Yongmun-ri, Boseong-eup, Boseong-gun ~ Dogae-ri, Miryeok-myeon, Boseong-gun) 1.44 km section opened
- December 31, 1999: Moksadong 1st Bridge (Pyeong-ri, Moksadong-myeon ~ Yeonhwa-ri, Jukgok-myeon, Gokseong-gun) 520m section reconstruction opening, existing 220m section abolished
- October 16, 2000: Jindo Bypass Road (Posan-ri ~ Dongoe-ri, Jindo-eup, Jindo-gun) 4.08 km section expansion opening, existing 1.97 km section abolished
- August 3, 2001: Haenam ~ Okcheon Road (Namoe-ri, Haenam-eup ~ Yeongsin-ri, Okcheon-myeon, Haenam-gun) 12.2 km section expansion opening
- July 14, 2003: Wolga-ri ~ Dunjeon-ri, Gunnae-myeon, Jindo-gun 5.63 km section expansion opening, existing 8.45 km section abolished
- December 31, 2004: Songho-ri, Hwangsan-myeon ~ Hocheon-ri, Haenam-eup, Haenam-gun 12.99 km section expansion opening
- January 30, 2005: Sammak-ri, Imhoe-myeon, Jindo-gun 1.2 km section improvement opening
- December 14, 2005: 2nd Jindo Bridge, (Nokjin-ri, Gunnae-myeon, Jindo-gun ~ Hakdong-ri, Munnae-myeon, Haenam-gun) 1.2 km section opened
- December 28, 2007: Hakdong-ri, Munnae-myeon ~ Songho-ri, Hwangsan-myeon, Haenam-gun 17.37 km section expansion opening, existing 18.63 km section abolished
- January 30, 2008: Chodang-ri ~ Deongnim-ri, Miryeok-myeon, Boseong-gun 3.65 km section expansion opening
- March 31, 2008: Sachon-ri, Anyang-myeon, Jangheung-gun ~ Jeonil-ri, Hoecheon-myeon, Boseong-gun 4.28 km section expansion opening, existing 2.86 km section abolished
- July 28, 2009: Bongsan-ri, Boseong-eup, Boseong-gun 3.51 km section expansion opening, existing Bongsan-ri, Boseong-eup ~ Dogae-ri, Miryeok-myeon, Boseong-gun 13.16 km section abolished
- December 30, 2009: Gyera-ri, Doam-myeon ~ Seoseong-ri, Gangjin-eup, Gangjin-gun 7.04 km section temporarily opened
- May 27, 2010: For Jindo Imhoe Bridge (Seokgyo-ri, Imhoe-myeon, Jindo-gun) reconstruction work until May 2012, 44m section road zone changed
- March 27, 2015: Due to national highway relocation, starting point changed from Oil Three-way Intersection, Gogun-myeon, Jindo-gun to Geumgol Intersection, Gunnae-myeon
- April 23, 2015: Gunnae ~ Gogun Road (Dunjeon-ri ~ Nokjin-ri, Gunnae-myeon, Jindo-gun) 5.13 km section expansion opening, existing 5.8 km section abolished
- June 18, 2018: Traffic restrictions until July 17, 2018 due to complete resurfacing of 2nd Jindo Bridge deck
- December 31, 2021: Haenam Okcheon ~ Gangjin Doam Road (Yeongchun-ri, Okcheon-myeon, Haenam-gun ~ Jiseok-ri, Doam-myeon, Gangjin-gun) 4.7 km section temporarily opened until February 17, 2022
- March 31, 2022: Haenam Okcheon ~ Gangjin Doam Road (Yeongchun-ri, Okcheon-myeon, Haenam-gun ~ Jiseok-ri, Doam-myeon, Gangjin-gun) 5.7 km section improvement opening, existing Yeongchun-ri, Okcheon-myeon, Haenam-gun ~ Jiseok-ri, Doam-myeon, Gangjin-gun total 4.63 km section abolished, Hwaeomsa Access Road (Gwangpyeong-ri ~ Hwangjeon-ri, Masan-myeon, Gurye-gun) 3.8 km section expansion opening, existing Naengcheon-ri ~ Masan-ri, Masan-myeon, Gurye-gun 2.3 km section abolished

== Main stopovers ==
South Jeolla Province

- Jindo County - Haenam County - Gangjin County - Jangheung County - Boseong County - Suncheon - Gokseong County - Suncheon - Gurye County

== Major intersections ==
- (■): Motorway

IS: Intersection, IC: Interchange

=== South Jeolla Province ===
| Name | Hangul name | Connection | Location | | Note |
|---|---|---|---|---|---|
| Geumgol IS | 금골 교차로 | National Route 18 (Jindo-daero) | Jindo County | Gunnae-myeon | Terminus |
| Sedeung IS | 세등삼거리 | Byeokpajin-ro | Jindo County | Gunnae-myeon | |
| Chaengjae | 챙재 | Songsan-gil | Jindo County | Gunnae-myeon | |
| Oilsi IS | 오일시삼거리 | Oilsi 1-gil | Jindo County | Gogun-myeon | |
| Goseong IS | 고성삼거리 | Oilsi 2-gil | Jindo County | Gogun-myeon | |
| Gogun-myeon sojaeji (Osan Elementary School) | 고군면소재지 (오산초등학교) | Naesan-ro | Jindo County | Gogun-myeon | |
| Jimak IS | 지막삼거리 | Prefectural Route 801 (Hayul-gil) | Jindo County | Gogun-myeon | |
| Mosa IS | 모사삼거리 | Mosa-gil | Jindo County | Gogun-myeon | |
| Hyangdong IS | 향동삼거리 | Ullimsanbang-ro | Jindo County | Gogun-myeon | |
| Gagye IS | 가계삼거리 | Gagye-gil | Jindo County | Gogun-myeon | |
| Hoedong IS | 회동삼거리 | Hoedong-gil | Jindo County | Gogun-myeon | |
| Uidong Elementary School | 의동초등학교 | | Jindo County | Uisin-myeon | |
| Uisin-myeon sojaeji | 의신면소재지 | Donji-ro | Jindo County | Uisin-myeon | |
| Uisin Middle School | 의신중학교 | | Jindo County | Uisin-myeon | |
| Uisin-myeon Donji-ri | 의신면돈지리 | Jugyeopdonji-ro | Jindo County | Uisin-myeon | |
| Georyong IS | 거룡삼거리 | Yonghogeoryong-ro | Jindo County | Uisin-myeon | |
| Uisin Elementary School Myeonggeum Branch School (Closed) | 의신초등학교 명금분교 (폐교) | | Jindo County | Uisin-myeon | |
| Uisin-myeon Geumgap-ri | 의신면금갑리 | Jeopdo-ro | Jindo County | Uisin-myeon | |
| Namdo National Gugak Center | 국립남도국악원 | | Jindo County | Imhoe-myeon | |
| Gwiseong IS | 귀성삼거리 | Arirang-gil | Jindo County | Imhoe-myeon | |
| Najulro Museum (Sangman Elementary School) | 나절로미술관 (구 상만초등학교) | | Jindo County | Imhoe-myeon | |
| Jungman-ri Town Hall | 중만리마을회관 | | Jindo County | Imhoe-myeon | 1 lane section |
| Baejungson Shrine | 배중손사당 | Imhoesandong-gil | Jindo County | Imhoe-myeon | 1 lane section |
| Gulpo IS | 굴포삼거리 | Gulpo-gil | Jindo County | Imhoe-myeon | |
| Namseon IS | 남선삼거리 | Namseon-gil | Jindo County | Imhoe-myeon | |
| Dongnyeonggae IS | 동령개삼거리 | Dongnyeonggae-gil | Jindo County | Imhoe-myeon | |
| Namdo Fortress (Jindo Namdoseokseong Stone Fortress) | 남도석성앞 (진도 남도진성) | Namdoseokseong-ro | Jindo County | Imhoe-myeon | |
| Seomang IS | 서망삼거리 | Seomanghang-gil | Jindo County | Imhoe-myeon | |
| Baengmok IS | 팽목삼거리 | Jindohang-gil | Jindo County | Imhoe-myeon | |
| Jindoji IS | 진구지삼거리 | Prefectural Route 803 (Jindoji-gil) | Jindo County | Imhoe-myeon | |
| Seokseong IS | 석성삼거리 | Namdoseokseong-ro | Jindo County | Imhoe-myeon | |
| Baekdong IS | 백동삼거리 | Baekdong-gil | Jindo County | Imhoe-myeon | |
| Sindong IS | 신동삼거리 | Imhoesindong-gil | Jindo County | Imhoe-myeon | |
| Songwol IS | 송월삼거리 | | Jindo County | Imhoe-myeon | |
| Seokgyo IS | 석교삼거리 | Sibilsi-gil | Jindo County | Imhoe-myeon | |
| Yeomjang IS | 염장삼거리 | Yeomjang-gil | Jindo County | Jindo-eup | |
| Poseo IS | 포서삼거리 | Seombawichiljeon-ro | Jindo County | Jindo-eup | |
| Poseo Bridge | 포서교 | | Jindo County | Jindo-eup | |
| Posan IS | 포산삼거리 | Pogu 1-gil | Jindo County | Jindo-eup | |
| Posan IS | 포산 교차로 | Jogeumsijang-gil | Jindo County | Jindo-eup | |
| Namdong IS (Jindo Public Bus Terminal) | 남동 교차로 (진도공용터미널) | Nammun-gil | Jindo County | Jindo-eup | |
| Jindo Culture Center | 진도향토문화회관 | | Jindo County | Jindo-eup | |
| Dongoe IS | 동외 교차로 | Dongoe 1-gil | Jindo County | Jindo-eup | |
| Jindo High School IS (Jindo High School) | 진도고교앞 교차로 (진도고등학교) | Jeonggeoreumjae-gil; Dongoe 4-gil | Jindo County | Jindo-eup | |
| Gunnae IS | 군내 교차로 | Gaheung-ro | Jindo County | Gunnae-myeon | |
| Jindo Tunnel | 진도터널 | | Jindo County | Gunnae-myeon | Approximately 620m |
| Geumgol IS | 금골 교차로 | National Route 18 (Dunjeon-gil); Jindo-daero | Jindo County | Gunnae-myeon | |
| Nokjin IS | 녹진 교차로 | Prefectural Route 803 (Jindo-daero); Seobuhaean-ro | Jindo County | Gunnae-myeon | Prefectural Route 803 overlap |
| Jindo Bridge | 진도대교 | | Jindo County | Gunnae-myeon | Prefectural Route 803 overlap |
| Jindo Bridge | | | Haenam County | Munnae-myeon | Prefectural Route 803 overlap |
| Usuyeong Bridge | 우수영교 | | Haenam County | Munnae-myeon | Prefectural Route 803 overlap |
| Usuyeong IS | 우수영 교차로 | National Route 77 (Gwangwangnejeo-ro); Prefectural Route 803 (Gongnyong-daero) | Haenam County | Munnae-myeon | National Route 77 overlap Prefectural Route 803 overlap |
| Sagyo IS | 사교 교차로 | Myeongnyang-ro | Haenam County | Munnae-myeon | National Route 77 overlap |
| Gwanchun IS | 관춘 교차로 | Myeongnyang-ro | Haenam County | Hwangsan-myeon | National Route 77 overlap |
| Namri IS | 남리 교차로 | National Route 77 (Gocheonam-ro) | Haenam County | Hwangsan-myeon | National Route 77 overlap |
| Wonho IS | 원호 교차로 | Myeongnyang-ro | Haenam County | Hwangsan-myeon | |
| Masan IS | 마산 교차로 | Prefectural Route 806 (Myeongnyang-ro) | Haenam County | Masan-myeon | Prefectural Route 806 overlap |
| Bokpyeong Bridge | 복평교 | | Haenam County | Masan-myeon | Prefectural Route 806 overlap |
| Bokpyeong Bridge | | | Haenam County | Haenam-eup | Prefectural Route 806 overlap |
| Haenam IS | 해남 교차로 | National Route 13 (Ttangkkeut-daero) | Haenam County | Haenam-eup | National Route 13 overlap Prefectural Route 806 overlap |
| Pyeongdong IS | 평동 교차로 | Prefectural Route 806 (Gosan-ro) | Haenam County | Haenam-eup | National Route 13 overlap Prefectural Route 806 overlap |
| Sinan IS | 신안 교차로 | Yeongbin-ro | Haenam County | Haenam-eup | National Route 13 overlap |
| Sinan Bridge | 신안교 | | Haenam County | Haenam-eup | National Route 13 overlap |
| Haenam Tunnel | 해남터널 | | Haenam County | Haenam-eup | National Route 13 overlap Approximately 650m |
| Haenam Tunnel | | | Haenam County | Okcheon-myeon | National Route 13 overlap Approximately 650m |
| Songun IS | 송운 교차로 | National Route 13 (Gongnyong-daero) | Haenam County | Okcheon-myeon | National Route 13 overlap |
| Okcheon Middle School (Closed) | 옥천중학교(폐교) | | Haenam County | Okcheon-myeon | |
| Yeongchon IS | 영춘삼거리 | Haenam-ro | Haenam County | Okcheon-myeon | |
| Okcheon-myeon Office Okcheon-myeon Health Center | 옥천면사무소 옥천면보건지소 | | Haenam County | Okcheon-myeon | |
| Okcheon-myeon Seongsan-ri | 옥천면성산리 | Okcheon-ro | Haenam County | Okcheon-myeon | |
| Dongnyeong IS | 동령삼거리 | Prefectural Route 819 (Jiseok-ro) | Gangjin County | Doam-myeon | Prefectural Route 819 overlap |
| Gyera IS | 계라 교차로 | Prefectural Route 55; Prefectural Route 819 (Baek-doro) | Gangjin County | Doam-myeon | Prefectural Route 55, 819 overlap |
| Sincheon IS | 신천 교차로 | Haegang-ro | Gangjin County | Gangjin-eup | Prefectural Route 55 overlap |
| Hosan IS | 호산 교차로 | Deoknam-ro | Gangjin County | Gangjin-eup | Prefectural Route 55 overlap |
| Pyeongdong IS | 평동 교차로 | National Route 2 (Noksaek-ro); Prefectural Route 829 (Boeun-ro) | Gangjin County | Gangjin-eup | National Route 2 overlap Prefectural Route 55 overlap |
| Nampo IS | 남포 교차로 | Namdang-ro; Nampo-gil | Gangjin County | Gangjin-eup | National Route 2 overlap Prefectural Route 55 overlap |
| Mokri 1 Bridge | 목리1교 | | Gangjin County | Gangjin-eup | National Route 2 overlap Prefectural Route 55 overlap |
| Mokri 1 Bridge | | | Gangjin County | Gundong-myeon | National Route 2 overlap Prefectural Route 55 overlap |
| Mokri IS | 목리 교차로 | National Route 23 (Cheongja-ro) | Gangjin County | Gundong-myeon | National Route 2 overlap Prefectural Route 55 overlap |
| Tamjin Bridge | 탐진교 | | Gangjin County | Gundong-myeon | National Route 2 overlap Prefectural Route 55 overlap |
| Gundong IS | 군동 교차로 | Seokgyo-ro; Gundongpyeongni-gil | Gangjin County | Gundong-myeon | National Route 2 overlap Prefectural Route 55 overlap |
| Pyeongchang Bridge | 평창교 | | Gangjin County | Gundong-myeon | National Route 2 overlap Prefectural Route 55 overlap |
| Pyeongchang Bridge | | | Jangheung County | Jangheung-eup | National Route 2 overlap Prefectural Route 55 overlap |
| Tamjin 2 Bridge | 탐진2교 | | Jangheung County | Jangheung-eup | National Route 2 overlap Prefectural Route 55 overlap |
| Sunji IS | 순지 교차로 | National Route 23; Prefectural Route 55 (Jangheung-daero) | Jangheung County | Jangheung-eup | National Route 2 overlap Prefectural Route 55 overlap |
| Pyeonghwa Bridge | 평화교 | | Jangheung County | Jangheung-eup | National Route 2 overlap |
| Hyangyang IS | 향양 교차로 | National Route 2 (Noksaek-ro) | Jangheung County | Jangheung-eup | National Route 2 overlap |
| Gisan IS | 기산삼거리 | Gisan-gil; Udeuraendeu-gil | Jangheung County | Anyang-myeon | |
| Suyang IS | 수양삼거리 | National Route 77 (Yongan-ro) | Jangheung County | Anyang-myeon | National Route 77 overlap |
| Unjeong IS | 운정사거리 | Anyang-ro | Jangheung County | Anyang-myeon | National Route 77 overlap |
| Sachon IS | 사촌 교차로 | Sumunyonggong-ro | Jangheung County | Anyang-myeon | National Route 77 overlap |
| Sinchon IS | 신촌 교차로 | Anyang-ro | Jangheung County | Anyang-myeon | National Route 77 overlap |
| Surak IS | 수락 교차로 | Sumunyonggong-ro; Surak-gil | Jangheung County | Anyang-myeon | National Route 77 overlap |
| Sumun Tunnel | 수문터널 | | Jangheung County | Anyang-myeon | National Route 77 overlap Approximately 180m |
| Yonggok IS | 용곡 교차로 | Prefectural Route 819 (Sumunyonggong-ro) | Jangheung County | Anyang-myeon | National Route 77 overlap |
| Hoeryeong | 회령삼거리 | Prefectural Route 845 (Nambugwangwang-ro) | Boseong County | Hoecheon-myeon | National Route 77 overlap |
| Hoeryeong IS | 회령삼거리 | Prefectural Route 895 (Illim-ro) | Boseong County | Hoecheon-myeon | National Route 77 overlap |
| Bamgogae IS | 밤고개삼거리 | Prefectural Route 845 (Nambugwangwang-ro) | Boseong County | Hoecheon-myeon | National Route 77 overlap |
| Botjae IS | 봇재 교차로 | Boseong Tea Plantation | Boseong County | Hoecheon-myeon | National Route 77 overlap |
| Onsu IS | 온수 교차로 | | Boseong County | Boseong-eup | National Route 77 overlap |
| Jangsu IS | 장수 교차로 | National Route 2 (Noksaek-ro) | Boseong County | Boseong-eup | National Route 2, National Route 77 overlap |
| Chodang IS | 초당 교차로 | National Route 2 National Route 77 (Noksaek-ro); Hongseong-ro | Boseong County | Miryeok-myeon | National Route 2, National Route 77 overlap |
| Deokrim IS | 덕림 교차로 | Prefectural Route 843 (Boseonggang-ro) | Boseong County | Miryeok-myeon | |
| Boseonggang Bridge | 보성강교 | | Boseong County | Miryeok-myeon | |
| Boseong IC (Chunjeong IS) | 보성 나들목 (춘정 교차로) | Namhae Expressway; National Route 29 (Hwabo-ro) | Boseong County | Miryeok-myeon | |
| Boseong IC IS | 보성IC 교차로 | Songjae-ro | Boseong County | Miryeok-myeon | |
| Yongjeong IS | 용정삼거리 | Prefectural Route 895 (Yongjeong-gil) | Boseong County | Miryeok-myeon | |
| Juamho Wetland Ecological Park | 주암호생태습지 | | Boseong County | Boknae-myeon | |
| Boknae IS Boknae-myeon Office | 복내사거리 복내면사무소 | Prefectural Route 58; Prefectural Route 845 (Gaegi-ro) | Boseong County | Boknae-myeon | Prefectural Route 58 overlap |
| Boknae Bus stop | 복내정류소 | | Boseong County | Boknae-myeon | Prefectural Route 58 overlap |
| Boknae Middle School Boseong High School of Information & Communication | 복내중학교 보성정보통신고등학교 | | Boseong County | Boknae-myeon | Prefectural Route 58 overlap |
| Boknae Middle School | 복내중고교앞 | Prefectural Route 58 (Donggyo-gil) | Boseong County | Boknae-myeon | Prefectural Route 58 overlap |
| Bongjeong Bridge | 봉정교 | | Boseong County | Boknae-myeon | |
| Bongjeong Bridge | | | Boseong County | Mundeok-myeon | |
| No name | (이름 없음) | Dongsosan-gil | Boseong County | Mundeok-myeon | |
| Yongam IS (Juamho Sculpture Park) (Soh Jaipil Memorial Park) | 용암삼거리 (주암호조각공원) (서재필기념공원) | National Route 15; Prefectural Route 15 (Mohu-ro) | Boseong County | Mundeok-myeon | National Route 15 overlap Prefectural Route 15 overlap |
| Dolmen Park | 고인돌공원 | | Suncheon City | Songgwang-myeon | National Route 15 overlap Prefectural Route 15 overlap |
| Gokcheon Bridge | 곡천교 | | Suncheon City | Songgwang-myeon | National Route 15 overlap Prefectural Route 15 overlap |
| Gokcheon IS | 곡천삼거리 | National Route 15; National Route 27; Prefectural Route 15 (Ssanghyangsu-gil) | Suncheon City | Songgwang-myeon | National Route 15 overlap National Route 27 overlap Prefectural Route 15 overlap |
| Songgwang Bus stop | 송광정류장 | | Suncheon City | Songgwang-myeon | National Route 27 overlap |
| (Pyeongchon) | (평촌) | Prefectural Route 897 (Hugok-gil) | Suncheon City | Songgwang-myeon | National Route 27 overlap Prefectural Route 897 overlap |
| Songgwangsa IS | 송광사삼거리 | Prefectural Route 897 (Songgwangsaan-gil) | Suncheon City | Songgwang-myeon | National Route 27 overlap Prefectural Route 897 overlap |
| Pine Hills Country Club | 파인힐스CC | | Suncheon City | Juam-myeon | National Route 27 overlap |
| Mungil IS | 문길삼거리 | National Route 22; National Route 27 (Dongju-ro) | Suncheon City | Juam-myeon | National Route 22 overlap National Route 27 overlap |
| Suncheon Juam Middle School | 순천주암중학교 | | Suncheon City | Juam-myeon | National Route 22 overlap |
| Changchon IS | 창촌삼거리 | National Route 22 (Dongju-ro) | Suncheon City | Juam-myeon | National Route 22 overlap |
| Changchon Health Clinic | 창촌보건진료소 | | Suncheon City | Juam-myeon | |
| Hanwool High School | 한울고등학교 | | Gokseong County | Moksadong-myeon | |
| Moksadong-myeon Office | 목사동면사무소 | | Gokseong County | Moksadong-myeon | |
| Pyeongri IS | 평리삼거리 | Sinsunggyeom-ro | Gokseong County | Moksadong-myeon | |
| Moksadongje 1 Bridge | 목사동제1교앞 | Gangbyeon-ro | Gokseong County | Moksadong-myeon | |
| Moksadong 1 Bridge | 목사동1교 | | Gokseong County | Moksadong-myeon | |
| Moksadong 1 Bridge | | | Gokseong County | Jukgok-myeon | |
| Yeonhwa IS | 연화삼거리 | Daehwanggang-ro | Gokseong County | Jukgok-myeon | |
| Taepyeong IS | 태평삼거리 | Ojuk-ro | Gokseong County | Jukgok-myeon | |
| Taeansa IS | 태안사삼거리 | Prefectural Route 840 (Taean-ro) | Gokseong County | Jukgok-myeon | |
| Apnok IS | 압록사거리 | National Route 17 (Seomjingang-ro) | Gokseong County | Ogok-myeon | National Route 17 overlap |
| Apnok Bridge | 압록교 | | Gokseong County | Ogok-myeon | National Route 17 overlap |
| Apnok Bridge | | | Gokseong County | Jukgok-myeon | National Route 17 overlap |
| Bokhoje 1 Bridge | 복호제1교 | | Suncheon City | Hwangjeon-myeon | National Route 17 overlap |
| Guryegu Station (Seonbyeon IS) | 구례구역 (선변삼거리) | Seomjingang-ro | Suncheon City | Hwangjeon-myeon | National Route 17 overlap |
| Gurye Bridge | 구례교 | | Suncheon City | Hwangjeon-myeon | National Route 17 overlap |
| Gurye Bridge | | | Gurye County | Gurye-eup | National Route 17 overlap |
| Checkpoint Entrance IS | 검문소입구 교차로 | Seomjingang-ro; Sinchon-gil | Gurye County | Gurye-eup | National Route 17 overlap |
| Jeonnam Natural Science High School Gurye Middle School Gurye County Office | 전남자연과학고등학교 구례중학교 구례군청 | | Gurye County | Gurye-eup | National Route 17 overlap |
| (Unnamed rotary) | (로터리 이름 없음) | Prefectural Route 861 (Sudalsaengtae-ro); Bongseong-ro | Gurye County | Gurye-eup | National Route 17 overlap |
| Gurye Public Bus Terminal | 구례공영버스터미널 | Jungang-ro | Gurye County | Gurye-eup | National Route 17 overlap |
| Gurye Social Welfare Center | 구례종합사회복지관 | | Gurye County | Gurye-eup | National Route 17 overlap |
| Seosi Bridge (southbound) | 서시교 남단 | Seosicheon-ro | Gurye County | Gurye-eup | National Route 17 overlap |
| Seosi Bridge | 서시교 | | Gurye County | Gurye-eup | National Route 17 overlap |
| Seosi Bridge | | | Gurye County | Masan-myeon | National Route 17 overlap |
| Naengcheon IC | 냉천 나들목 | National Route 17; National Route 19 (Saneom-ro) | Gurye County | Masan-myeon | National Route 17 overlap National Route 19 overlap |
| Naengcheon IS | 냉천삼거리 | National Route 19 (Seomjingang-daero) | Gurye County | Masan-myeon | National Route 19 overlap |
| Cheongcheon Elementary School Masan-myeon Office | 청천초등학교 마산면사무소 | | Gurye County | Masan-myeon | |
| Magwang IS | 마광삼거리 | Hanguktongsin-ro | Gurye County | Masan-myeon | |
| Hwaeomsa | 화엄사 | | Gurye County | Masan-myeon | Terminus |
