= National Route 22 (South Korea) =

Road in South Korea

National Route 22
- 국도 제22호선

Route information
- Length: 204.5 km (127.1 mi)
- Existed: 31 August 1971–present

Major junctions
- West end: Jeongeup, North Jeolla Province
- East end: Suncheon, South Jeolla Province

Location
- Country: South Korea

Highway system
- Highway systems of South Korea; Expressways; National; Local

National Route 22 is a national highway in South Korea connects Jeongeup to Suncheon. It established on 31 August 1971.

== History ==
- August 31, 1971: Designated as National Route 22 Yeonggwang–Suncheon Line under the National Highway Route Designation Decree.
- March 14, 1981: The starting point was extended from "Beopseongpo, Beopseong-myeon, Yeonggwang-gun, Jeollabuk-do" to "Jeongju-eup, Jeongeup-gun, Jeollabuk-do." Accordingly, the line name changed from "Yeonggwang–Suncheon Line" to "Jeongju–Suncheon Line."
- May 30, 1981: Road zone changed to include the extended 60 km section under the revised Presidential Decree No. 10247.
- August 17, 1981: Opening of 5.01 km section from Yongdeok-ri to Daedeok-ri, Beopseong-myeon, Yeonggwang-gun, upgraded to national highway.
- May 13, 1986: Starting point changed from "Jeongju-eup, Jeongeup-gun, Jeollabuk-do" to "Jeongju-si, Jeollabuk-do."
- January 18, 1994: Expanded and opened 21.4 km road between Dongbok and Gwangcheon (Guam-ri, Dong-myeon, Hwasun-gun – Gwangcheon-ri, Juam-myeon, Seungju-gun).
- July 1, 1996: Starting point changed from "Jeongju-si, Jeollabuk-do" to "Jeongeup-si, Jeollabuk-do." Accordingly, the line name changed to "Jeongeup–Suncheon Line."
- July 22, 1997: Expanded and opened Jeongju–Heungdeok road section (Jeongil-dong, Jeongeup-si – Dongsari, Heungdeok-myeon, Gochang-gun).
- September 16, 1999: Improved and opened 160 m section at Daegu-ri, Seomyeon, Suncheon-si; abolished 250 m of old section.
- January 1, 2001: Expanded and opened 13.38 km Beopseong–Yeonggwang section (Hwacheon-ri, Beopseong-myeon, Yeonggwang-gun – Hakjeong-ri, Yeonggwang-eup, Yeonggwang-gun); abolished 10.58 km old section.
- January 13, 2003: Opened relocated 2.2 km section (Sincheon-ri, Moryang-myeon, Yeonggwang-gun – Hakjeong-ri, Yeonggwang-eup) due to Bulgap District Agricultural Water Development Project; abolished old section.
- December 1, 2003: Temporary opening of 3.5 km Miljae Tunnel section (Yeonam-ri, Moryang-myeon, Yeonggwang-gun – Geumdeok-ri, Haebo-myeon, Hampyeong-gun) until February 28, 2004.
- April 26, 2004: Expanded and opened Hwasun–Dongmyeon section.
- July 5, 2004: Partially opened 1.3 km section (Eubae-ri – Yeonwol-ri, Dongbok-myeon, Hwasun-gun).
- August 20, 2004: Partially opened 5.8 km section (Eubae-ri – Yucheon-ri, Dongbok-myeon, Hwasun-gun).
- November 20, 2004: Temporary opening of 3.5 km Miljae Tunnel section until March 10, 2005.
- September 15, 2005: Expanded and opened 6.5 km section (Baekyong-ri – Bokam-ri, Dong-myeon, Hwasun-gun); abolished 9.0 km section (Yongpo-ri – Bokam-ri).
- October 31, 2005: Expanded and opened 4-lane Dongmyeon–Yongpo section.
- January 25, 2006: Partially opened 11.5 km Yeonggwang–Haebo section (Hakjeong-ri, Yeonggwang-eup – Geumdeok-ri, Haebo-myeon, Hampyeong-gun).
- May 3, 2006: Partially opened 1.7 km Yeonggwang–Haebo section (Geumdeok-ri – Haebo-ri, Haebo-myeon, Hampyeong-gun).
- May 31, 2007: Partially opened 5.7 km Yeonggwang–Haebo section (Haebo-ri, Haebo-myeon – Oechi-ri, Wolya-myeon, Hampyeong-gun).
- June 30, 2007: Expanded and opened 10.276 km Seonunsa–Heungdeok road (Samin-ri, Asan-myeon, Gochang-gun – Heungdeok-ri, Heungdeok-myeon, Gochang-gun); abolished 13.9 km old section.
- September 7, 2007: Expanded and opened 540 m Yeonggwang–Haebo section (Oechi-ri, Wolya-myeon, Hampyeong-gun); abolished 19.34 km old section (Hakjeong-ri, Yeonggwang-eup – Oechi-ri, Wolya-myeon, Hampyeong-gun); Miljae Tunnel fully opened.
- October 25, 2013: Expanded and opened 8-lane Gwangju–Hwasun section.
- November 21, 2014: Expanded and opened 5.7 km Hwasun–Gwangju section including Hwasun Tunnel (Daeri Gyori Intersection, Hwasun-eup, Hwasun-gun, Jeollanam-do – Naenam-dong Naeji Intersection, Dong-gu, Gwangju).
- March 27, 2015: Endpoint changed from "Jeongeup City Hall Road Marker, Suseong-dong, Jeongeup-si" to "Yeonjisa Intersection, Yeonji-dong, Jeongeup-si."
- November 20, 2017: Expanded and opened 10.72 km Seungju Bypass (Sinjeon-ri, Seungju-eup, Suncheon-si – Hakgu-ri, Seomyeon, Suncheon-si); abolished 1.25 km section (Sinjeon-ri – Bongdeok-ri, Seungju-eup, Suncheon-si) and 6.72 km section (Seopyeong-ri, Seungju-eup – Daegu-ri, Seomyeon, Suncheon-si).

== Main stopovers ==
North Jeolla Province

- Jeongeup - Gochang County

South Jeolla Province

- Yeonggwang County - Hampyeong County

Gwangju

- Gwangsan District - Seo District - Nam District - Dong District

South Jeolla Province

- Hwasun County - Suncheon

== Major intersections ==
- (■): Motorway

IS: Intersection, IC: Interchange

=== North Jeolla Province ===
Name	Hangul name	Connection	Location		Note
Yeonji IS	연지사거리	Prefectural Route 701 (Seobusaneop-doro)	Jeongeup City	Yeonji-dong	Terminus; National Route 29 overlap
Jeongju Underpass	정주지하차도		Jeongeup City	Yeonji-dong	National Route 29 overlap
Lotte Mart Jeongeup	롯데마트 정읍점	Beotkkot-ro	Jeongeup City	Nongso-dong	National Route 29 overlap Connected with Jeongeup IC; Connected with Prefectural Route 705
Chongil Girls' Middle School Nongso-dong Community Center	정일여자중학교 농소동주민센터		Jeongeup City	Nongso-dong	National Route 29 overlap
Jucheon IS	주천삼거리	National Route 29 (Yeongwon-ro)	Jeongeup City	Nongso-dong	National Route 29 overlap
Judong IS	주동삼거리	Jeodong-gil	Jeongeup City	Soseong-myeon	
Sojeong IS	소성사거리	Bohwa 1-gil Chunsu 1-gil	Jeongeup City	Soseong-myeon	
Waseok IS	와석삼거리	Bohwa 1-gil	Jeongeup City	Soseong-myeon	
Wolseong IS	월성 교차로	Dungdungbau-gil; Oeto-gil	Gochang County	Seongnae-myeon	
Seongnae IS	성내삼거리	Sigi 1-gil	Gochang County	Seongnae-myeon	
Dongsan IS	동산삼거리	Sigi 1-gil	Gochang County	Seongnae-myeon	
Heungdeok Bridge	흥덕교		Gochang County	Seongnae-myeon	
Heungdeok Bridge			Gochang County	Heungdeok-myeon	
Jeha IS	제하사거리	National Route 23 (Buan-ro); Seonun-daero	Gochang County	Heungdeok-myeon	National Route 29 overlap
Mokhwa IS	목화 교차로	Heungdeok-ro	Gochang County	Heungdeok-myeon	National Route 29 overlap
(Mokhwa Bridge)	(목화교)	National Route 23 (Goindol-daero)	Gochang County	Heungdeok-myeon	National Route 29 overlap
Yadong IS	야동 교차로	Seonun-daero	Gochang County	Heungdeok-myeon	
Seonunsan IC (Seokgyo IS)	선운산 나들목 (석교 교차로)	Seohaean Expressway	Gochang County	Heungdeok-myeon	
Bongseon Bridge	봉선교		Gochang County	Heungdeok-myeon	
Bongseon Bridge			Gochang County	Buan-myeon	
Deokheung IS	덕흥 교차로	Bokbunja-ro	Gochang County	Buan-myeon	
Sangdeung IS	상등 교차로	Jeonbongjun-ro	Gochang County	Buan-myeon	Connected with Prefectural Route 734
Sangyong Tunnel	상용터널		Gochang County	Buan-myeon	Approximately 195m
Yongsan 1 IS	용산1 교차로	Prefectural Route 734 (Ungok-ro)	Gochang County	Buan-myeon	Connected with Yongsan 2 IS
Seonunsa Tunnel	선운사터널		Gochang County	Buan-myeon	Approximately 576m
Seonunsa Tunnel			Gochang County	Asan-myeon	Approximately 576m
Incheongang Bridge	인천강교		Gochang County	Asan-myeon	
Banam IS	반암 교차로	Bokbunja-ro	Gochang County	Asan-myeon	
Samin IS	삼인 교차로	Seonunsa-ro; Yeongi-gil	Gochang County	Asan-myeon	
Yongseon IS	용선삼거리	Prefectural Route 734 (Inchon-ro)	Gochang County	Simwon-myeon	
Simwon Elementary School Simwon-myeon Office Simwon Bus stop Simwon Middle School	심원초등학교 심원면사무소 심원버스정류장 심원중학교		Gochang County	Simwon-myeon	
Palhyeongchi IS	팔형치사거리	National Route 77 (Dongho-ro); Geumpyeong-gil	Gochang County	Haeri-myeon	National Route 77 overlap
Gungsan IS	궁산삼거리	Prefectural Route 15 (Dongseo-daero)	Gochang County	Haeri-myeon	National Route 77 overlap Prefectural Route 15 overlap
Wanggeo IS	왕거삼거리		Gochang County	Haeri-myeon	National Route 77 overlap Prefectural Route 15 overlap
Bangchuk IS	방축삼거리	Saban-ro	Gochang County	Haeri-myeon	National Route 77 overlap Prefectural Route 15 overlap
Jiro IS	지로사거리	Prefectural Route 733 (Naseong-ro)	Gochang County	Haeri-myeon	National Route 77 overlap Prefectural Route 15, 733 overlap
Geomsan IS	검산삼거리	Sangha-ro	Gochang County	Sangha-myeon	National Route 77 overlap Prefectural Route 15, 733 overlap
Sangha Terminal	상하터미널		Gochang County	Sangha-myeon	National Route 77 overlap Prefectural Route 15, 733 overlap
Sin IS	신사거리	Sangha 1-gil	Gochang County	Sangha-myeon	National Route 77 overlap Prefectural Route 15, 733 overlap
Sangha IS	상하 교차로	Prefectural Route 733 (Jinamgusipo-ro)	Gochang County	Sangha-myeon	National Route 77 overlap Prefectural Route 15, 733 overlap
Yongdeok IS	용덕삼거리	Sangha-ro	Gochang County	Sangha-myeon	National Route 77 overlap Prefectural Route 15 overlap
Yongdae IS	용대삼거리	National Route 77 (Saemmok-ro)	Gochang County	Sangha-myeon	National Route 77 overlap Prefectural Route 15 overlap
Donghak Peasant Revolution	동학농민혁명발상지		Gochang County	Gongeum-myeon	Prefectural Route 15 overlap Continuation into South Jeolla Province
Gongeum IS	공음삼거리	Chamnamujeong 1-gil	Gochang County	Gongeum-myeon	Prefectural Route 15 overlap Continuation into South Jeolla Province
Sinpyeong IS	신평삼거리	Gongeum-gil	Gochang County	Gongeum-myeon	Prefectural Route 15 overlap Continuation into South Jeolla Province

=== South Jeolla Province (North Gwangju) ===
Name	Hangul name	Connection	Location		Note
Samdeok IS	삼덕삼거리	Yongseongwolsan-ro 1-gil	Yeonggwang County	Beopseong-myeon	Prefectural Route 15 overlap North Jeolla Province - South Jeolla Province border line
Daedeok IS	대덕삼거리	Yongseongwolsan-ro	Yeonggwang County	Beopseong-myeon	Prefectural Route 15 overlap North Jeolla Province - South Jeolla Province border line
Seongjae IS	성재 교차로	Prefectural Route 15 (Yongdeok-ro)	Yeonggwang County	Beopseong-myeon	Prefectural Route 15 overlap North Jeolla Province - South Jeolla Province border line
Bokyong IS	복용삼거리		Yeonggwang County	Beopseong-myeon	
Watan Bridge	와탄교		Yeonggwang County	Beopseong-myeon	
Watan Bridge			Yeonggwang County	Yeonggwang-eup	
Deokho IS	덕호삼거리	Deokho-ro	Yeonggwang County	Yeonggwang-eup	
Chilseong IS	칠성삼거리	Deokho-ro	Yeonggwang County	Yeonggwang-eup	
Sinwol IS	신월삼거리	Deokho-ro	Yeonggwang County	Yeonggwang-eup	
Jangdong IS	장동 교차로	Wolhyeon-ro	Yeonggwang County	Yeonggwang-eup	
Sinpyeong IS	신평 교차로	Prefectural Route 844 (Baeksu-ro) (Yeongdae-ro)	Yeonggwang County	Yeonggwang-eup	
Sinha IS	신하 교차로	Sinnam-ro	Yeonggwang County	Yeonggwang-eup	
Jongsan IS	종산 교차로	Prefectural Route 808 (Cheonnyeon-ro)	Yeonggwang County	Yeonggwang-eup	
Noksa IS	녹사 교차로	National Route 23 (Hamnyeong-ro)	Yeonggwang County	Yeonggwang-eup	
Hakjeong IS	학정 교차로	Jungang-ro	Yeonggwang County	Yeonggwang-eup	
Hakjeong Bridge	학정교	Miljae-ro	Yeonggwang County	Yeonggwang-eup	
Sincheon IS	신천 교차로	Miljae-ro	Yeonggwang County	Myoryang-myeon	
Bulgapsajinipro IS	불갑사진입로 교차로	Miljae-ro; Bulgapsa-ro	Yeonggwang County	Myoryang-myeon	
Miljae Tunnel	밀재터널		Yeonggwang County	Myoryang-myeon	Right tunnel: Approximately 958m Left tunnel: Approximately 968m
Miljae Tunnel			Hampyeong County	Haebo-myeon	Right tunnel: Approximately 958m Left tunnel: Approximately 968m
Geumdeok IS	금덕 교차로	Miljae-ro	Hampyeong County	Haebo-myeon	
Sinchon IS	신촌 교차로	Prefectural Route 838 (Sinhae-ro)	Hampyeong County	Haebo-myeon	
Haebo IS	해보 교차로	Haesam-ro	Hampyeong County	Haebo-myeon	
Yongsan IS	용산 교차로	National Route 24 (Hamjang-ro)	Hampyeong County	Haebo-myeon	
Munjang Bridge	문장교		Hampyeong County	Haebo-myeon	
Munjang Bridge			Hampyeong County	Wolya-myeon	
Wolya IS	월야 교차로	Prefectural Route 838 (Munhwa-ro)	Hampyeong County	Wolya-myeon	
Oechi IS	외치 교차로	Miljae-ro	Hampyeong County	Wolya-myeon	Continuation into Gwangju

=== Gwangju ===
Name	Hangul name	Connection	Location		Note
Samgeo IS	삼거 교차로	Noansamdo-ro	Gwangju	Gwangsan District	South Jeolla Province - Gwangju border line
Oun IS	오운 교차로	Samdo-ro	Gwangju	Gwangsan District	
Samdo IS	삼도 교차로	Samdo-ro	Gwangju	Gwangsan District	
No name	(이름 없음)	Samdo-ro; Samdosedong-gil	Gwangju	Gwangsan District	
Jipyeong IS	지평 교차로	Prefectural Route 49 (Bitgaramjangseong-ro)	Gwangju	Gwangsan District	
Songsan Bridge	송산대교		Gwangju	Gwangsan District	
Honam University Gwangsan Campus	호남대학교 광산캠퍼스		Gwangju	Gwangsan District	
Unsu IS	운수 교차로	Donggok-ro	Gwangju	Gwangsan District	Unsu IC (Muan-Gwangju Eressway) indirectly connected
Gwangju Gwangsan Police Station	광주광산경찰서		Gwangju	Gwangsan District	
Sochon Industrial Complex	소촌산단삼거리	Sochon-ro	Gwangju	Gwangsan District	
Kumho Tire	금호타이어		Gwangju	Gwangsan District	
Songjeong Underpass	송정지하차도		Gwangju	Gwangsan District	
No name	(이름 없음)	Sangmu-daero; Naesang-ro	Gwangju	Gwangsan District	
Eoryong-dong Community Center	어룡동주민센터		Gwangju	Gwangsan District	
Songjeong Park station	송정공원역	Songjeonggongwon-ro; Gwangsan-ro 89beon-gil	Gwangju	Gwangsan District	
Gwangju Management High School	광주경영고등학교		Gwangju	Gwangsan District	
Songdo-ro Entrance	송도로입구	National Route 13 (Songdo-ro)	Gwangju	Gwangsan District	
Songjeong IC	송정 나들목	National Route 13 (Saam-ro)	Gwangju	Gwangsan District	
Gwangju Airport (Airport station)	광주공항 (공항역)		Gwangju	Gwangsan District	
Geukrak Bridge	극락교		Gwangju	Gwangsan District	
Geukrak Bridge			Gwangju	Seo District	
Geukrak Bridge IS	극락교 교차로	Cheonbyeonjwaha-ro	Gwangju	Seo District	
Seochang IS	서창 교차로	Gwangju Loop 2	Gwangju	Seo District	
Kim Daejung Convention Center station	김대중컨벤션센터역	Sangmunuri-ro	Gwangju	Seo District	
Sangmu-daero Entrance	상무대로입구	Sangmugongwon-ro	Gwangju	Seo District	
Sangmu station	상무역	Sangmujungan-ro	Gwangju	Seo District	
Sangmujigu Entrance	상무지구입구	Uncheon-ro	Gwangju	Seo District	
Uncheon station	운천역	Sangmuminju-ro; Sangmu-daero 884beon-gil	Gwangju	Seo District	
Honam University Ssangchon Campus	호남대학교 쌍촌캠퍼스		Gwangju	Seo District	
Ssangchon station (Ssangchon station IS) (Roman Catholic Archdiocese of Gwangju)	쌍촌역 (쌍촌역 교차로) (천주교 광주대교구청)	World Cup 4gang-ro	Gwangju	Seo District	
Hwajeong station	화정역	Hwamun-ro	Gwangju	Seo District	
Nongseong station (Nongseong IS) (Nongseong Underpass)	농성역 (농성 교차로) (농성지하차도)	National Route 1 (Daenam-daero) (Jukbong-daero); Sangmu-daero	Gwangju	Seo District	National Route 1 overlap
Association of Health IS	건강관리협회 교차로	Hwajeong-ro	Gwangju	Seo District	National Route 1 overlap
No name	(이름 없음)	Geumhwa-ro	Gwangju	Nam District	National Route 1 overlap
Juwol IS	주월 교차로	Hoejae-ro	Gwangju	Nam District	National Route 1 overlap
Baekun IS (Baekun Overpass)	백운 교차로 (백운고가차도)	National Route 1 Prefectural Route 60 (Seomun-daero)	Gwangju	Nam District	National Route 1 overlap Prefectural Route 60 overlap
Namgwang Bridge	남광교		Gwangju	Nam District	Prefectural Route 60 overlap Namgwangju Overpass
Namgwang Bridge			Gwangju	Dong District	Prefectural Route 60 overlap Namgwangju Overpass
Namgwangju Overpass IS	남광주고가 교차로	Cheonbyeonu-ro	Gwangju	Dong District	Prefectural Route 60 overlap Namgwangju Overpass
Namgwangju IS (Namgwangju station)	남광주 교차로 (남광주역)	National Route 29; Prefectural Route 55; Prefectural Route 60 (Pilmun-daero)	Gwangju	Dong District	National Route 29 overlap Prefectural Route 55, 60 overlap
Hakdong Intercity Bus Terminal	학동시외버스정류소		Gwangju	Dong District	National Route 29 overlap Prefectural Route 55 overlap
Hakdong IS (Hakdong–Jeungsimsa station)	학동삼거리 (학동·증심사입구역)	Uijae-ro; Nammun-ro 701beon-gil	Gwangju	Dong District	National Route 29 overlap Prefectural Route 55 overlap
Wonji IS	원지교 교차로	Jungsimcheon-ro; Cheonbyeonu-ro	Gwangju	Dong District	National Route 29 overlap Prefectural Route 55 overlap
Donggu Cultural Center Jiwon 1-dong Community Center	동구문화센터 지원1동주민센터		Gwangju	Dong District	National Route 29 overlap Prefectural Route 55 overlap
Sotae station IS (Sotae Intercity Bus Terminal)	소태역 교차로 (소태역시외버스정류소)	Jiwon-ro; Nammun-ro 587beon-gil	Gwangju	Dong District	National Route 29 overlap Prefectural Route 55 overlap
Jiwon 2-dong Community Center	지원2동주민센터		Gwangju	Dong District	National Route 29 overlap Prefectural Route 55 overlap
Jiwon IS	지원 교차로	Gwangju Loop 2	Gwangju	Dong District	National Route 29 overlap Prefectural Route 55 overlap
Naeji IS	내지 교차로	Nammun-ro	Gwangju	Dong District	National Route 29 overlap Prefectural Route 55 overlap
Seongyo Bridge	선교교		Gwangju	Dong District	National Route 29 overlap Prefectural Route 55 overlap
Sinneoritjae Tunnel	신너릿재터널		Gwangju	Dong District	National Route 29 overlap Prefectural Route 55 overlap Approximately 765m Continuation into South Jeolla Province

=== South Jeolla Province (South Gwangju) ===
Name	Hangul name	Connection	Location		Note
Sinneoritjae Tunnel	신너릿재터널		Hwasun County	Hwasun-eup	National Route 29 overlap Prefectural Route 55 overlap Approximately 765m Gwangju - South Jeolla Province border line
Gyori IC	교리 나들목	Seoyang-ri; Ssangchung-ro	Hwasun County	Hwasun-eup	National Route 29 overlap Prefectural Route 55 overlap
Daeri 2 IS	대리2 교차로	Prefectural Route 55 (Oseong-ro); Chilchung-ro	Hwasun County	Hwasun-eup	National Route 29 overlap Prefectural Route 55 overlap
Hwasun IC	화순 나들목	National Route 29 (Hwabo-ro)	Hwasun County	Hwasun-eup	National Route 29 overlap
Daji IS	다지 교차로	Gwangdeok-ro	Hwasun County	Hwasun-eup	
Jisil IS	지실 교차로	Jisil-gil	Hwasun County	Hwasun-eup	
Baekdong Bridge	백동교		Hwasun County	Hwasun-eup	
Baekdong Bridge			Hwasun County	Dong-myeon	
Yongpo IS	용포 교차로	Chungui-ro	Hwasun County	Dong-myeon	
Unnong Tunnel	운농터널		Hwasun County	Dong-myeon	Approximately 1055m
Cheondeok 2 Tunnel	천덕2터널		Hwasun County	Dong-myeon	Approximately 345m
Cheondeok 1 Tunnel	천덕1터널		Hwasun County	Dong-myeon	Approximately 271m
Dongam IS	동암 교차로	Cheondeok-gil	Hwasun County	Dong-myeon	
Guam Tunnel	구암터널		Hwasun County	Dong-myeon	Approximately 672m
Guam IS	구암 교차로	National Route 15; Prefectural Route 15 (Mohu-ro)	Hwasun County	Dong-myeon	National Route 15 overlap Prefectural Route 15 overlap
Guam IS	구암삼거리	Chungui-ro	Hwasun County	Dong-myeon	National Route 15 overlap Prefectural Route 15 overlap
Bokam IS	복암삼거리	Prefectural Route 897 (Gyubong-ro)	Hwasun County	Dong-myeon	National Route 15 overlap Prefectural Route 15 overlap
Gyeongchi-ri IS	경치리 교차로	Jeokbyeong-ro	Hwasun County	Iseo-myeon	National Route 15 overlap Prefectural Route 15 overlap
Yeonwol IS	연월 교차로	National Route 15; Prefectural Route 15 (Dongju-ro)	Hwasun County	Dongbok-myeon	National Route 15 overlap Prefectural Route 15 overlap
Dongbok IS	동복 교차로	Prefectural Route 822 (Gimsatgat-ro)	Hwasun County	Dongbok-myeon	
Dongbok Tunnel	동복터널		Hwasun County	Dongbok-myeon	Approximately 394m
Yucheon IS	유천 교차로	Ojiho-ro	Hwasun County	Dongbok-myeon	
Unal Tunnel	운알터널		Hwasun County	Dongbok-myeon	Approximately 945m
Unal Tunnel			Suncheon City	Juam-myeon	Approximately 945m
Unryeong Bridge	운룡교		Suncheon City	Juam-myeon	
Juam Terminal Juam-myeon Office	주암터미널 주암면사무소		Suncheon City	Juam-myeon	
Juam IS	주암사거리	National Route 27 (Juseok-ro)	Suncheon City	Juam-myeon	National Route 27 overlap
Gwangcheon Bridge	광천교		Suncheon City	Juam-myeon	National Route 27 overlap
Gusan IS	구산삼거리	Gusangangbyeon-gil	Suncheon City	Juam-myeon	National Route 27 overlap
Juam Elementary School	주암초등학교		Suncheon City	Juam-myeon	National Route 27 overlap
Juam IC	주암 나들목	Honam Expressway	Suncheon City	Juam-myeon	National Route 27 overlap
Mungil IS	문길삼거리	National Route 18; National Route 27 (Songgwangsa-gil)	Suncheon City	Juam-myeon	National Route 18 overlap National Route 27 overlap
Suncheon Juam Middle School	순천주암중학교		Suncheon City	Juam-myeon	National Route 18 overlap
Changchon IS	창촌삼거리	National Route 18 (Jumok-ro)	Suncheon City	Juam-myeon	National Route 18 overlap
Sapo Bridge	사포교 서단	Dongju-ro	Suncheon City	Juam-myeon	
Jeopchi	접치		Suncheon City	Juam-myeon	
Jeopchi			Suncheon City	Seungju-eup	
Jeopchi IS	접치삼거리	Dongju-ro; Sindu-gil	Suncheon City	Seungju-eup	
Sinjeon Entrance	신전입구	Sindu-gil	Suncheon City	Seungju-eup	
Seungpyeong IS	승평삼거리	Seungpyeong-gil	Suncheon City	Seungju-eup	
Seungju IC	승주 나들목	Honam Expressway	Suncheon City	Seungju-eup	
Suncheon Seungju Middle School Seungju Elementary School	순천승주중학교 승주초등학교		Suncheon City	Seungju-eup	
Seopyeong IS	서평삼거리	Prefectural Route 857 (Seonamsa-gil)	Suncheon City	Seungju-eup	Prefectural Route 857 overlap
Seungju-eup Office	승주읍사무소		Suncheon City	Seungju-eup	Prefectural Route 857 overlap
Naesang IS	내상삼거리	Prefectural Route 857 (Naesang-ro)	Suncheon City	Seungju-eup	Prefectural Route 857 overlap
Hakgu IS	학구삼거리	National Route 17 (Suncheon-ro)	Suncheon City	Seo-myeon	National Route 17 overlap
Dongsan IS	동산삼거리	Dongsan-gil	Suncheon City	Seo-myeon	National Route 17 overlap
West Suncheon IC	서순천 나들목	Namhae Expressway; Honam Expressway	Suncheon City	Seo-myeon	National Route 17 overlap
Suncheon Electronic High School	순천전자고등학교		Suncheon City	Seo-myeon	National Route 17 overlap
Seo-myeon Office Entrance	서면사무소입구	Imchondong-gil; Jukpyeong-gil	Suncheon City	Seo-myeon	National Route 17 overlap
Dongsan Elementary School	동산초등학교		Suncheon City	Seo-myeon	National Route 17 overlap
Seonpyeong IS	선평삼거리	National Route 17 (Baekgang-ro)	Suncheon City	Seo-myeon	National Route 17 overlap
Suncheon Jeil High School	순천제일고등학교		Suncheon City	Samsan-dong	
Gagok IS	가곡삼거리	Gangbyeon-ro	Suncheon City	Samsan-dong	
Police Station IS	경찰서앞 교차로	Sinyong-gil; Jobi-gil	Suncheon City	Samsan-dong	
Samsan-dong Community Center	삼산동주민센터		Suncheon City	Samsan-dong	
Sunchon National University	순천대학교		Suncheon City	Samsan-dong	
Suncheonbuk Bus Terminal	순천북부정류장		Suncheon City	Maegok-dong	
Medical Center IS	의료원앞 교차로	Gangnam-ro; Doseogwan-gil; Seomunseongteo-gil; Honam-gil	Suncheon City	Maegok-dong	Terminus
