= Gokseong County =

Coordinates: 35°16′51″N 127°17′43″E

Gokseong
- County
- Panoramic view of Gokseong-eup

- Flag Emblem of Gokseong

- Location in South Korea
- Country: South Korea
- Region: Honam
- Provincial-level city: Jeonnam-Gwangju
- Administrative divisions: 1 eup, 10 myeon

Area
  - Total: 547.37 km^{2} (211.34 sq mi)

Population (September 2024)
  - Total: 26,638
  - Density: 56.7/km^{2} (147/sq mi)
  - Dialect: Jeolla

Korean name
- Hangul: 곡성군
- Hanja: 谷城郡
- RR: Gokseong-gun
- MR: Koksŏng-gun

Gokseong County (Korean: 곡성군) is a county in Jeonnam-Gwangju, South Korea and the least densely populated subdivision of the province.

== Attractions ==
- Taeansa Temple
- Neungpa Tower
- Seomjin River
- Dongli mountain valley
- Gok-song Haneulnari Village (a farming-themed village)
- Gokseong Train Village (site of historical steam engine train where folks can take a ride on an old fashioned train)

== Transportation ==
=== Train ===
The Jeolla Line comes through Gokseong station, with KTX, ITX-Saemaeul, Saemaeul-ho and Mugunghwa-ho train services. The Saemaeul-ho and Mugunghwa-ho trains all stop on the way to Gokseong.

=== Bus ===
Buses to Gwangju and Gurye County take 30 minutes and ones to Namwon take 1 hour. However, it is quite difficult to go to southern parts of Jeolla like Suncheon via bus.

=== Car ===
There are 3 interchanges on the Honam Expressway. These interchanges are joined with other roads.

== Festival ==
- Gokseong World Rose Festival - Every May, the World Rose Festival is held in Gokseong, Jeonnam-Gwangju. In the train town of Gokseong Seomjin River, tourists can enjoy a variety of attractions and experience programs including a steam locomotive and a rail bike.
- Gokseong Shimcheong Children's Grand Festival (Korean: 곡성 심청 어린이 대축제; RR: Gogseong Simcheong eolin-i daechugje) (2021–) - The town of Gokseong in Jeonnam-Gwangju hosts the annual Sim Cheong Festival (Korean: 심청축제; Hanja: 沈淸祝祭; RR: Simcheongchukje) (2001–2020) in an attempt to celebrate Sim Cheong's filial piety and reinterpret the meaning of filial piety in modern society. Gokseong is considered to be the setting for Gwaneunsa yeongi seolhwa, which is known to be the original story on which The Tale of Sim Chong is based.

== Sister cities ==
Gokseong County is twinned domestically with:

- Gangdong-gu, South Korea (1996)
- Geochang, South Korea (1998)
- Seo-gu, South Korea (2000)
- Uijeongbu, South Korea (2010)

And internationally with:

- Hawaiʻi County, Hawaiʻi, United States
