= List of highways numbered 38 =

The following highways are numbered 38:

== Australia ==
- A38 (Sydney)

== Canada ==
- Alberta Highway 38
- Ontario Highway 38 (former)
- Saskatchewan Highway 38

== Czech Republic ==
- I/38 Highway; Czech: Silnice I/38

== Germany ==
- Bundesautobahn 38

== Greece ==
- EO38 road

== India ==
- National Highway 38 (India)

== Iran ==
- Road 38

== Israel ==
- Highway 38 (Israel)

== Italy ==
- State road 38

== Japan ==
- Japan National Route 38
- E38 Dōtō Expressway

== Korea, South ==
- National Route 38

== Malaysia ==
- SMART Tunnel
- FT 38 Johor Bahru Eastern Dispersal Link Expressway (also used as E14)

== New Zealand ==
- New Zealand State Highway 38

== United Kingdom ==
- British A38 (Bodmin-Mansfield)

== United States ==
- U.S. Route 38 (former)
- Alabama State Route 38
  - County Route 38 (Lee County, Alabama)
- Arkansas Highway 38
- California State Route 38
  - County Route J38 (California)
- Colorado State Highway 38 (former)
- Georgia State Route 38
- Hawaii Route 38 (former)
- Idaho State Highway 38
- Illinois Route 38
- Indiana State Road 38
- Iowa Highway 38
- K-38 (Kansas highway) (former)
- Kentucky Route 38
- Louisiana Highway 38
- Maryland Route 38
- Massachusetts Route 38
- M-38 (Michigan highway)
- Minnesota State Highway 38
- Missouri Route 38
- Montana Highway 38
- Nebraska Highway 38 (former)
  - Nebraska Highway 38C (former)
- Nevada State Route 38 (former)
- New Hampshire Route 38
- New Jersey Route 38
  - County Route 38 (Bergen County, New Jersey)
  - County Route 38 (Monmouth County, New Jersey)
  - County Route 38 (Ocean County, New Jersey)
- New Mexico State Road 38
- New York State Route 38
  - County Route 38 (Cayuga County, New York)
  - County Route 38 (Chemung County, New York)
  - County Route 38 (Dutchess County, New York)
  - County Route 38 (Essex County, New York)
  - County Route 38 (Genesee County, New York)
  - County Route 38 (Greene County, New York)
  - County Route 38 (Livingston County, New York)
  - County Route 38 (Madison County, New York)
  - County Route 38 (Montgomery County, New York)
  - County Route 38 (Orange County, New York)
  - County Route 38 (Putnam County, New York)
  - County Route 38 (Rensselaer County, New York)
  - County Route 38 (Rockland County, New York)
  - County Route 38 (St. Lawrence County, New York)
  - County Route 38 (Suffolk County, New York)
  - County Route 38 (Warren County, New York)
  - County Route 38 (Wyoming County, New York)
- North Carolina Highway 38
- North Dakota Highway 38
- Ohio State Route 38
- Oklahoma State Highway 38
- Oregon Route 38
- Pennsylvania Route 38
- South Carolina Highway 38
- South Dakota Highway 38
- Tennessee State Route 38
- Texas State Highway 38 (former)
  - Texas State Highway Loop 38 (former)
  - Texas State Highway Spur 38
  - Farm to Market Road 38
  - Texas Park Road 38
- Utah State Route 38
- Vermont Route 38
- Virginia State Route 38
  - Virginia State Route 38 (1923-1933) (former)
- West Virginia Route 38
- Wisconsin Highway 38

Territories

- Puerto Rico Highway 38
- U.S. Virgin Islands Highway 38

== See also ==
- List of highways numbered 38A
- List of highways numbered 38B

Preceded by 37	Lists of highways 38	Succeeded by 39
