= Local Route 13 (South Korea) =

Road in South Korea

State-Funded Local Highway 13
- 국가지원지방도 제13호선
- Sinji-Wando Line 신지 ~ 완도선

Route information
- Length: 8.4 km (5.2 mi)
- Existed: 19 July 1996–present

Major junctions
- From: Sinji-myeon, Wando County, South Jeolla
- National Route 13; National Route 77
- To: Wando-eup, Wando County, South Jeolla

Location
- Country: South Korea
- Major cities: Wando County

Highway system
- Highway systems of South Korea; Expressways; National; Local

Local Route 13 Sinji–Wando Line (Korean: 국가지원지방도 제13호선 신지 ~ 완도선) is a local route of South Korea that connecting Sinji-myeon, Wando County, South Jeolla Province to Wando-eup in Wando County, South Jeolla Province.

== History ==
This route was established on 19 July 1996.

== Stopovers ==
South Jeolla Province

- Wando County (Sinji-myeon - Wando-eup)

== Major intersections ==
- (■): Motorway

IS: Intersection, IC: Interchange

=== South Jeolla Province ===
| Name | Hangul name | Connection | Location | | Note |
|---|---|---|---|---|---|
| Sinsang-ri | 신상리 | Sinji-ro | Wando County | Sinji-myeon | Terminus |
| Dokgyeryeong Sinji Terminal Sinji Health Center Sin-ri | 독계령 신지터미널 신지보건지소 신리 | | Wando County | Sinji-myeon | |
| Songgok IS | 송곡 교차로 | National Route 77 (Sinji-ro) | Wando County | Sinji-myeon | National Route 77 overlap |
| Dwitgol IS | 뒷골 교차로 | | Wando County | Sinji-myeon | National Route 77 overlap |
| Mulhatae IS | 물하태 교차로 | Sinji-ro 6beon-gil | Wando County | Sinji-myeon | National Route 77 overlap |
| Gangdok IS | 강독 교차로 | Gangdok-gil | Wando County | Sinji-myeon | National Route 77 overlap |
| Sinji Bridge | 신지대교 | | Wando County | Sinji-myeon | National Route 77 overlap |
| Sinji Bridge | | | Wando County | Wando-eup | National Route 77 overlap |
| Wando IS | 완도 교차로 | National Route 13; National Route 77 (Wando-ro) (Jangbogo-daero) | Wando County | Wando-eup | National Route 77 overlap |
Connected with National Route 13

== See also ==
- South Jeolla Province
- National Route 13
