= National Route 38 (South Korea) =

Road in South Korea

National Route 38
- 국도 제38호선

Route information
- Length: 411.0 km (255.4 mi)
- Existed: 31 August 1971–present

Major junctions
- South end: Taean County, South Chungcheong Province
- North end: Donghae, Gangwon Province

Location
- Country: South Korea

Highway system
- Highway systems of South Korea; Expressways; National; Local

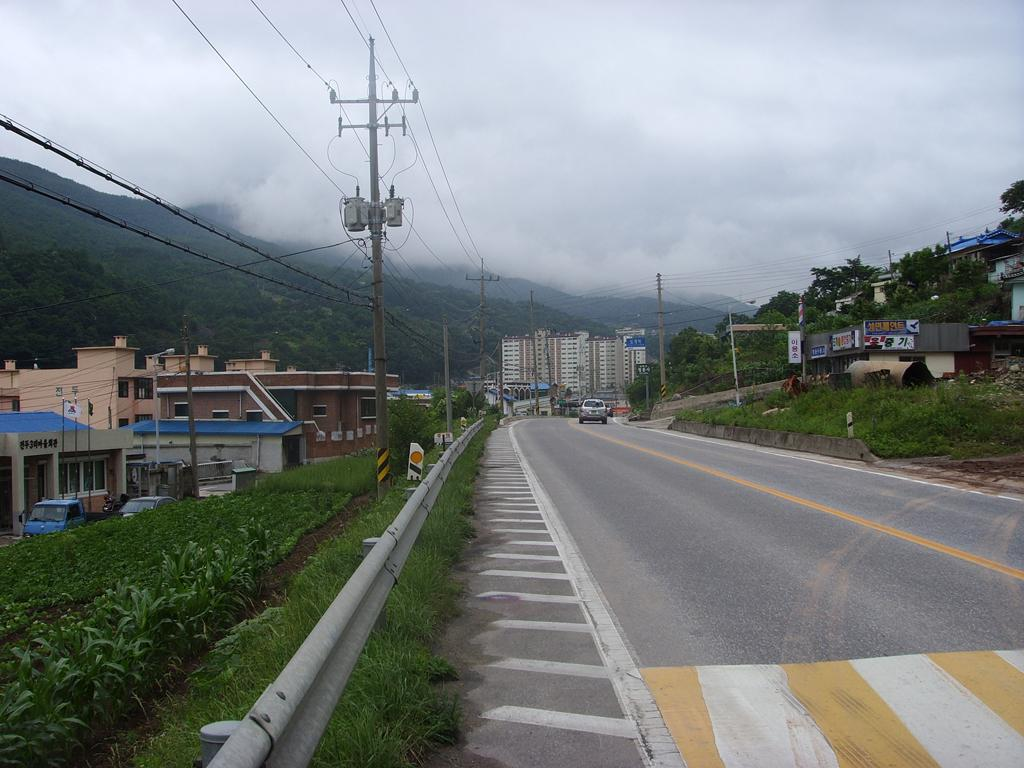
National Route 38 in Samcheok

National Route 38 is a national highway in South Korea connects Seosan to Donghae. It established on 31 August 1971.

== History ==
- August 31, 1971: National Route 38, the Pyeongtaek–Jeongseon Line, was established under the General National Highway Route Designation Decree.
- October 1, 1975: A 140 m section in Wonwol-ri, Sancheok-myeon, Jungwon County, was opened, while the existing 140 m section was abolished.
- March 15, 1977: A 1.6 km section in Goam-ri, Jecheon-eup, Jecheon County, was opened.
- February 22, 1980: A 6.0 km section between Changwon-ri and Yeondang-ri, Nam-myeon, Yeongwol County; a 4.5 km section between Ssangyong-ri, Seo-myeon, and Changwon-ri, Nam-myeon; and a 2.4 km section in Yeongheung-ri, Yeongwol-eup, were opened.
- March 14, 1981: The terminus was extended from Jeongseon-myeon, Jeongseon County, to Samcheok-eup, Samcheok County. Accordingly, the route was changed from the Pyeongtaek–Jeongseon Line to the Pyeongtaek–Samcheok Line.
- April 13, 1981: The 67 km section between Mungok-ri, Gunnan-myeon, Jeongseon County, and Namyang-ri, Samcheok-eup, Samcheok County, which had been elevated to national highway status, was opened.
- May 30, 1981: The road district was changed to the extended 67 km section following the amendment of the General National Highway Route Designation Decree by Presidential Decree No. 10247.
- May 13, 1986: The terminus was changed from Samcheok-eup, Samcheok County, to Samcheok City.
- October 30, 1990: The terminus was extended from Samcheok City to Donghae City. Accordingly, the route was changed from the Pyeongtaek–Samcheok Line to the Pyeongtaek–Donghae Line.
- February 11, 1995: The 2.3 km section between Yongdu-ri and Manjeong-ri, Gongdo-myeon, Anseong County, and the 7.1 km section between Geonji-ri, Daedeok-myeon, and Gasa-ri, Boge-myeon, were opened.
- July 1, 1996: The starting point was extended from Poseung-myeon, Pyeongtaek County, Gyeonggi Province, to Daesan-eup, Seosan City, South Chungcheong Province. Accordingly, the route was changed from the Pyeongtaek–Donghae Line to the Seosan–Donghae Line.
- November 11, 1996: The section between Onam Intersection and Gungjang Intersection, from Janghowon-ri, Janghowon-eup, Icheon City, to Ogung-ri, Gamgok-myeon, Eumseong County, was opened.
- April 7, 1997: The 1.056 km Manho Bridge section in Manho-ri, Poseung-myeon, Pyeongtaek City, was abolished.
- May 7, 1997: The 21 km section between Naegi-ri, Poseung-myeon, and Singung-ri, Paengseong-eup, Pyeongtaek City, was opened, while the 1.15 km section between Jukseong-ri and Sukseong-ri, Oseong-myeon, Pyeongtaek City, was abolished.
- August 23, 1997: The 17.3 km Anseong–Iljuk road between Dongsin-ri, Boge-myeon, Anseong County, and Woljeong-ri, Iljuk-myeon, was widened and opened, while the existing 6 km section was abolished.
- July 2, 1998: The 3.21 km Manho–Anjung road between Manho-ri and Naegi-ri, Poseung-myeon, Pyeongtaek City, was widened and opened, while the existing 3.21 km section was abolished.
- September 24, 1998: The 15.6 km section between Sindong, Jecheon City, and Mudo-ri, Songhak-myeon, was designated as an automobile-only road.
- December 7, 1998: The 4.65 km Dunpo–Pyeongtaek road between Pyeonggung-ri, Paengseong-eup, Pyeongtaek City, and Hapjeong-dong was widened and opened, while the existing 5.3 km section was abolished.
- December 10, 1998: The 700 m Dangwang Overpass section in Dangwang-dong, Anseong City, was opened.
- December 31, 1998: The 16.26 km Iljuk–Janghowon road between Woljeong-ri, Iljuk-myeon, Anseong City, and Janghowon-ri, Janghowon-eup, Icheon City, was widened and opened, while the existing 16.28 km section was abolished.
- April 11, 2000: The 4.65 km Dunpo–Pyeongtaek road between Singung-ri, Paengseong-eup, Pyeongtaek City, and Hapjeong-dong was widened and opened.
- December 31, 2000: The 3.98 km section between Yeonbak-ri and Jupo-ri, Bongyang-eup, Jecheon City, was widened and opened, while the existing 4.54 km section was abolished.
- May 9, 2001: The 13.5 km section between Donghyeon-dong, Jecheon City, and Ssangyong-ri, Seo-myeon, Yeongwol County, was widened and opened, while the existing 11.557 km section was abolished.
- November 1, 2001: The 14.33 km section between Gohan-ri, Gohan-eup, Jeongseon County, and Samsu-dong, Taebaek City, including Dumundongjae Tunnel, was widened and opened, while the existing 17.37 km section was abolished.
- May 30, 2002: The 15.6 km section between Sindong, Jecheon City, and Mudo-ri, Songhak-myeon, was widened and opened, while the existing section was abolished.
- July 11, 2002: The 16.1 km section between Maesan-ri and Gagok-ri, Sinpyeong-myeon, Dangjin County, was widened and opened, while the existing section was abolished.
- December 24, 2002: The 12.56 km section between Neungam-ri, Angseong-myeon, Chungju City, and Yeongdeok-ri, Sancheok-myeon, was widened and opened, while the existing 7.25 km section was abolished.
- November 20, 2003: The 15.25 km section between Wangjang-ri, Gamgok-myeon, Eumseong County, and Neungam-ri, Angseong-myeon, Chungju City, was widened and opened.
- December 29, 2003: The 9.96 km section between Songgang-ri, Sancheok-myeon, Chungju City, and Pyeongdong-ri, Baegun-myeon, Jecheon City, was widened and opened.
- October 7, 2004: The 32.17 km section between Ssangyong-ri, Seo-myeon, Yeongwol County, at the Gangwon–Chungbuk provincial boundary, and Yemi-ri, Sindong-eup, Jeongseon County, was designated as an automobile-only road.
- December 31, 2004: The 19.87 km section between Ssangyong-ri, Seo-myeon, and Deokpo-ri, Yeongwol-eup, was widened and opened, while the existing 4.5 km section between Ssangyong-ri and Changwon-ri was abolished.
- January 5, 2005: The second construction section of Dumundongjae Tunnel, between Gohan-ri, Gohan-eup, Jeongseon County, and Hwajeon-dong, Taebaek City, 4.64 km in length, was widened and opened.
- February 11, 2005: The 2.2 km section between Machari and Cheongi-ri, Singi-myeon, Samcheok City, was widened and opened.
- April 2, 2005: The 2.2 km section between Machari and Cheongi-ri, Singi-myeon, Samcheok City, was widened and opened.
- June 3, 2005: The 5.19 km section between Singung-ri, Paengseong-eup, Pyeongtaek City, and Donggo-ri, Godeok-myeon, was widened and opened, while the existing section was abolished.
- January 10, 2007: The 8.19 km Sabuk–Gohan road between Sabuk-ri, Sabuk-eup, and Gohan-eup, Jeongseon County, was widened and opened.
- January 18, 2008: The 7.9 km Miro–Samcheok road between Sangjeong-ri, Miro-myeon, Samcheok City, and Deungbong-dong was widened and opened, while the existing 8.9 km section was abolished.
- December 18, 2008: The 11.0 km Sindong–Mungok road between Yemi-ri, Sindong-eup, Jeongseon County, and Mungok-ri, Nam-myeon, was widened and opened.
- December 24, 2009: The 10.6 km Mungok–Sabuk road between Mungok-ri, Nam-myeon, Jeongseon County, and Sabuk-ri, Sabuk-eup, was widened and opened.
- May 30, 2012: The 1.8 km section at Yuryang Intersection, between Yongdae-ri and Bonpyeong-ri, Angseong-myeon, Chungju City, was newly constructed and opened.
- September 24, 2015: The 9.28 km Daesan–Seomun–Gagok road between Tongjeong-ri, Seomun-myeon, and Gagok-ri, Songsan-myeon, Dangjin City, was widened and opened, while the existing 1.6 km section was abolished.
- December 16, 2016: The Taebaek–Samcheok road was widened and opened, consisting of a 19.1 km section from Tong-dong, Taebaek City, through Neukgu-ri, Dogye-eup, Samcheok City, to Machari, Singi-myeon, and a 6.2 km section from Machari to Hajeong-ri, Miro-myeon. The existing 3.19 km section between Heungjeon-ri and Magyo-ri, Dogye-eup; the existing 5.5 km section between Gosari, Dogye-eup, and Machari, Singi-myeon; and the existing 7.5 km section between Anui-ri, Singi-myeon, and Hajeong-ri, Miro-myeon, were abolished.
- December 30, 2016: The 1.86 km Seosan–Hwanggeumsan road in Dokgot-ri, Daesan-eup, Seosan City, was newly constructed and opened. The 10.66 km Daesan–Seomun road between Hwagok-ri, Daesan-eup, Seosan City, and Sambong-ri, Seomun-myeon, Dangjin City, was also widened and opened, while the existing 2.59 km section in Hwagok-ri and the existing 4 km section between Sambong-ri and Tongjeong-ri were abolished.
- June 22, 2021: The starting point was extended from Dokgot-ri, Daesan-eup, Seosan City, to Nae-ri, Iwon-myeon, Taean County. Accordingly, the route was changed from the Seosan–Donghae Line to the Taean–Donghae Line.
- May 22, 2023: The 1.1 km Dohwa–Songhak road of the Jecheon National Highway Bypass, between Dohwa Intersection in Dohwa-ri, Songhak-myeon, Jecheon City, and Songhak Intersection in Mudo-ri, was newly constructed and opened.
- July 11, 2025: The starting point was extended from Nae-ri, Iwon-myeon, Taean County, to Geunheung-myeon, Taean County.
- August 5, 2025: The 3.7 km Gongdo–Daedeok road between Manjeong-ri, Gongdo-eup, Anseong City, and Sinryeong-ri, Daedeok-myeon, was widened and opened.

== Main stopovers ==
South Chungcheong Province

- Seosan - Dangjin - Asan

Gyeonggi Province

- Pyeongtaek - Anseong - Icheon

North Chungcheong Province

- Eumseong - Chungju - Jecheon

Gangwon Province

- Yeongwol - Jeongseon - Taebaek - Samcheok - Donghae

== Major intersections ==
- (■): Expressway

IS: Intersection, IC: Interchange

=== South Chungcheong Province ===
| Name | Hangul name | Connection | Location | | Note |
|---|---|---|---|---|---|
| Dokgot 1 IS | 독곶1 교차로 | National Route 29 (Pyeongsin 1-ro) | Seosan City | Daesan-eup | |
| Myongji IS | 명지사거리 | National Route 29; National Route 77 (Chungui-ro) | Seosan City | Daesan-eup | National Route 29, 77 overlap |
| Hwagok IS | 화곡 교차로 | National Route 29 (Pyeongsin 1-ro) | Seosan City | Daesan-eup | National Route 29, 77 overlap |
| Samgil Harbor Entrance | 삼길포항입구 | | Seosan City | Daesan-eup | National Route 77 overlap |
| Daeho Seawall | | | Seosan City | Daesan-eup | National Route 77 overlap |
| Daeho Seawall | | | Dangjin City | Seokmun-myeon | National Route 77 overlap |
| Dobido IS | 도비도 교차로 | Daehoman-ro | Dangjin City | Seokmun-myeon | National Route 77 overlap |
| Daeho IS | 대호 교차로 | Chorak 2-ro | Dangjin City | Seokmun-myeon | National Route 77 overlap |
| Chorak IS | 초락 교차로 | Chorak 2-ro | Dangjin City | Seokmun-myeon | National Route 77 overlap |
| Sambong IS | 삼봉 교차로 | Prefectural Route 647 (Daeho-ro) | Dangjin City | Seokmun-myeon | National Route 77 overlap |
| Seokmun IS | 석문 교차로 | Prefectural Route 615 (Daehoman-ro) | Dangjin City | Seokmun-myeon | National Route 77 overlap |
| Tongjeong IS | 통정 교차로 | Haemyeong 1-ro | Dangjin City | Seokmun-myeon | National Route 77 overlap |
| No name | (교차로 이름 미정) | Sandan 1-ro | Dangjin City | Seokmun-myeon | National Route 77 overlap |
| Saeteo IS | 새터 교차로 | Samwha-gil | Dangjin City | Seokmun-myeon | National Route 77 overlap |
| Seokmun Bridge | | | Dangjin City | Seokmun-myeon | National Route 77 overlap |
| Seokmun Bridge | | | Dangjin City | Songsan-myeon | National Route 77 overlap |
| Musu IS | 무수 교차로 | Musudeul-gil | Dangjin City | Songsan-myeon | National Route 77 overlap |
| Gagok IS | 가곡 교차로 | Prefectural Route 633 (Songsan-ro) | Dangjin City | Songsan-myeon | National Route 77 overlap |
| Donggok IS (Donggok Underpass) | 동곡 교차로 (동곡지하차도) | | Dangjin City | Songsan-myeon | National Route 77 overlap |
| Songsan IS | 송산 교차로 | | Dangjin City | Songsan-myeon | National Route 77 overlap |
| Hyundai Steel IS (Underpass) | 현대제철 교차로 (지하차도) | | Dangjin City | Songak-eup | National Route 77 overlap |
| No name | (이름 없음) | Daeseom-gil | Dangjin City | Songak-eup | National Route 77 overlap |
| Godae IS | 고대 교차로 | Gojan-ro | Dangjin City | Songak-eup | National Route 77 overlap |
| Godae Complex IS | 고대공단 교차로 | Godae Complex 1-gil | Dangjin City | Songak-eup | National Route 77 overlap |
| Hanjin IS | 한진 교차로 | Prefectural Route 619 (Songak-ro) | Dangjin City | Songak-eup | National Route 77 overlap |
| Bugok IS | 부곡 교차로 | Sinbogun-ro; Bugokgongdan 1-gil | Dangjin City | Songak-eup | National Route 77 overlap |
| Songak IC | 송악 나들목 | Seohaean Expressway | Dangjin City | Songak-eup | National Route 77 overlap |
| Beomseok IS | 법석이 교차로 | Maesan-ro | Dangjin City | Sinpyeong-myeon | National Route 77 overlap |
| Unjeong IC | 운정 나들목 | National Route 34 (Seohae-ro) | Dangjin City | Sinpyeong-myeon | National Route 34, 77 overlap |
| Unjeong IS | 운정 교차로 | Datgeori-gil | Dangjin City | Sinpyeong-myeon | National Route 34, 77 overlap |
| Sapkyo Bridge | 삽교대교 | | Dangjin City | Sinpyeong-myeon | National Route 34, National Route 77 overlap |
| Sapgyo IS | 삽교 교차로 | Sapgyocheon-gil | Dangjin City | Sinpyeong-myeon | National Route 34, National Route 77 overlap |
| Sapgyocheon Seawall | | | Dangjin City | Sinpyeong-myeon | National Route 34, National Route 77 overlap |
| Sapgyocheon Seawall | | | Asan City | Inju-myeon | National Route 34, National Route 77 overlap |
| Munbang IS | 문방 교차로 | Injusandan-ro; Asanman-ro1578beon-gil | Asan City | Inju-myeon | National Route 34, National Route 77 overlap |
| Injugongdan IS | 인주공단 교차로 | Prefectural Route 623 (Injusandan-ro) | Asan City | Inju-myeon | National Route 34, National Route 77 overlap |
| Mildu IS | 밀두 교차로 | Hyeondae-ro; Geolmae-gil | Asan City | Inju-myeon | National Route 34, National Route 77 overlap |
| Inju Elementary School | 인주초등학교 | | Asan City | Inju-myeon | National Route 34, National Route 77 overlap |
| Gongse IS | 공세 교차로 | Gongse-gil | Asan City | Inju-myeon | National Route 34, National Route 77 overlap |
| Ibche IS (No name) | 입체 교차로 (이름 없음) | National Route 34 (Jangyeongsil-ro); National Route 39 (Asan-ro) | Asan City | Inju-myeon | National Route 34, National Route 77 overlap |
| Asan Lake IS | 아산호 교차로 | (No name) | Asan City | Inju-myeon | National Route 39, National Route 77 overlap |
| Asan Bay Seawall | 아산만방조제 | | Asan City | Inju-myeon | National Route 39, National Route 77 overlap |

=== Gyeonggi Province ===
| Name | Hangul name | Connection | Location | | Note |
|---|---|---|---|---|---|
| Asan Bay Seawall | 아산만방조제 | Seodongdae-ro | Pyeongtaek City | Hyeondeok-myeon | National Route 39, National Route 77 overlap |
| Hyeondeok IS | 현덕교차로 | National Route 39 (Seohae-ro) | Pyeongtaek City | Hyeondeok-myeon | National Route 39, National Route 77 overlap |
| Ugyeong IS | 우경삼거리 | Seodongdae-ro | Pyeongtaek City | Hyeondeok-myeon | National Route 77 overlap |
| Seobudu Entrance IS | 서부두입구삼거리 | | Pyeongtaek City | Poseung-eup | National Route 77 overlap |
| Sinmyeong 1 IS | 신명1리삼거리 | Jiksandong-gil | Pyeongtaek City | Poseung-eup | National Route 77 overlap |
| Manho IS | 만호사거리 | Pyeongtaekhang-ro; Pyeongtaekhangman-gil | Pyeongtaek City | Poseung-eup | National Route 77 overlap |
| Naegi IS Poseung Middle School | 내기삼거리 포승중학교 | National Route 77; National Route 82; Prefectural Route 82 (Poseunghyangnam-ro) | Pyeongtaek City | Poseung-eup | National Route 77 overlap |
| Poseung-eup Office Entrance | 포승읍사무소입구 | | Pyeongtaek City | Poseung-eup | |
| Pangrim IS | 방림삼거리 | Unjeong-gil; Pulmugol-gil | Pyeongtaek City | Poseung-eup | |
| Seokjeong pedestrian bridge | 석정보도육교 | | Pyeongtaek City | Poseung-eup | |
| Seokjeong IS | 석정삼거리 | Prefectural Route 313 (Poseungjangan-ro) | Pyeongtaek City | Anjung-eup | |
| Hyeonhwa IS | 현화 교차로 | Anhyeolloseo 9-gil Hyeonhwa 6-gil | Pyeongtaek City | Anjung-eup | |
| Pyeongtaek City Hall | 평택시청 안중출장소 | Hyeonhwajungang-gil | Pyeongtaek City | Anjung-eup | |
| Hakhyeon IS | 학현사거리 | Deokwoo-ro; Anjung-ro 131beon-gil | Pyeongtaek City | Anjung-eup | |
| Anjung IS | 안중오거리 | Anjung-ro; Anhyeon-ro | Pyeongtaek City | Anjung-eup | |
| Anjung IS | 안중사거리 | National Route 39 (Seohae-ro) | Pyeongtaek City | Anjung-eup | |
| Daeban IS | 대반 교차로 | Daeban-gil | Pyeongtaek City | Anjung-eup | |
| Anjung Hospital | 안중백병원 | | Pyeongtaek City | Anjung-eup | |
| Gireum IS | 길음사거리 | Oseongseo-ro | Pyeongtaek City | Oseong-myeon | |
| No name | (이름 없음) | Sukseong-gil | Pyeongtaek City | Oseong-myeon | |
| Oseong IC IS | 오성IC 교차로 | Cheongo-ro; Sukseongsijang-gil | Pyeongtaek City | Oseong-myeon | |
| Oseong IC | 오성 나들목 | Pyeongtaek–Hwaseong Expressway; National Route 43 | Pyeongtaek City | Oseong-myeon | |
| Seongnae IS | 청내삼거리 | Changsintteul-gil | Pyeongtaek City | Oseong-myeon | |
| (Gungan Viaduct) | (궁안고가교) | Prefectural Route 315 (Gangbyeon-ro) | Pyeongtaek City | Oseong-myeon | |
| Gungan Bridge | | | Pyeongtaek City | Oseong-myeon | |
| Gungan Bridge | | | Pyeongtaek City | Godeok-myeon | |
| Jungli IS | 궁리사거리 | Godeok-ro | Pyeongtaek City | Godeok-myeon | |
| Jeongja IS | 정자삼거리 | Donggo 1-gil | Pyeongtaek City | Godeok-myeon | |
| Godeok IS | 고덕 교차로 | National Route 45 (Nambukdae-ro) | Pyeongtaek City | Godeok-myeon | National Route 45 overlap |
| Bangchuk IS | 방축사거리 | Bangchuk-gil; Donggo 2-gil | Pyeongtaek City | Godeok-myeon | National Route 45 overlap |
| Sindae Overpass | 신대육교 | Eunsilgoga-gil; Pyeongnam-ro | Pyeongtaek City | Wonpyeong-dong | National Route 45 overlap |
| Anseongcheon 1 Bridge | | | Pyeongtaek City | Wonpyeong-dong | National Route 45 overlap |
| Anseongcheon 1 Bridge | | | Pyeongtaek City | Paengseong-eup | National Route 45 overlap |
| Singung IS | 신궁 교차로 | National Route 45 (Paengseong-ro) | Pyeongtaek City | Paengseong-eup | National Route 45 overlap |
| Anseongcheon 2 Bridge | | | Pyeongtaek City | Paengseong-eup | |
| Anseongcheon 2 Bridge | | | Pyeongtaek City | Sinpyeong-dong | |
| No name | (이름 없음) | Pyeongnam-ro | Pyeongtaek City | Sinpyeong-dong | |
| Bijeon Underpass IS | 비전지하차도사거리 | National Route 1 (Gyeonggidae-ro) | Pyeongtaek City | Sinpyeong-dong | |
| Pyeongtaek University | 평택대학교 | | Pyeongtaek City | Bijeon 2-dong | |
| Yongin IS | 용이 교차로 | Hyeonsil-ro | Anseong City | Gongdo-eup | |
| Ulin IS | 우린 교차로 | Jinsa-gil | Anseong City | Gongdo-eup | |
| Jueun IS | 주은 교차로 | Jingeonjung-gil; Hyeonsin 4-gil | Anseong City | Gongdo-eup | |
| Ginam IS | 기남 교차로 | Ihwa-ro | Anseong City | Gongdo-eup | |
| Anseong IC (Anseong IC IS) (Pyeongan Underpass) | 안성 나들목 (안성IC 삼거리) (평안지하차도) | Gyeongbu Expressway | Anseong City | Gongdo-eup | |
| Dusan Apartment | 태산아파트앞 | Beotkkot-gil | Anseong City | Gongdo-eup | |
| Jueunpunglim Apartment | 주은풍림아파트앞 | | Anseong City | Gongdo-eup | |
| Songdo IS | 공도삼거리 | Gongdo-ro | Anseong City | Gongdo-eup | |
| Gongdogieopdanji IS | 공도기업단지삼거리 | Gieopdanji-ro | Anseong City | Gongdo-eup | |
| Manjeong IS | 만정사거리 | Prefectural Route 302 (Deokbongseowon-ro); Gongdo 4-ro | Anseong City | Gongdo-eup | Prefectural Route 302 overlap |
| Peosiseu IS | 퍼시스사거리 | Gongdo-ro | Anseong City | Gongdo-eup | Prefectural Route 302 overlap |
| Buyeong Apartment | 부영아파트앞 | Mansu-ro | Anseong City | Gongdo-eup | Prefectural Route 302 overlap |
| Agricultural Education Center | 농협교육원앞 | Prefectural Route 302 (Sindumangok-ro) | Anseong City | Gongdo-eup | Prefectural Route 302 overlap |
| Anseong Lotte Mart | 롯데마트 안성점 | | Anseong City | Gongdo-eup | |
| Naeri IS | 내리사거리 | Sillyeong-ro; Jungangdaehak-ro | Anseong City | Daedeok-myeon | |
| Chungang University | 중앙대학교앞 | | Anseong City | Daedeok-myeon | Overpass |
| Daedeok IS | 대덕삼거리 | Jungang-ro | Anseong City | Daedeok-myeon | Overpass |
| Dosan IS | 모산사거리 | Prefectural Route 23 (Gongdan-ro) (Manse-ro) | Anseong City | Anseong-dong | |
| Daedeok Tunnel | 대덕터널 | | Anseong City | Anseong-dong | Approximately 460m |
| Dangwang IS (Danwon Overpass) | 당왕사거리 (단원고가차도) | Anseongmatchum-daero | Anseong City | Anseong-dong | |
| Bibong Tunnel | 비봉터널 | | Anseong City | Anseong-dong | Approximately 515m |
| Gasa IS | 가사 교차로 | Prefectural Route 325 (Bogaewonsam-ro) | Anseong City | Anseong-dong | Prefectural Route 57 overlap |
| Anseong Bus Terminal (Terminal IS) | 안성종합버스터미널 (터미널 교차로) | Prefectural Route 57 (Yeongbong-ro); Bibong-ro | Anseong City | Anseong-dong | Prefectural Route 57 overlap |
| Sports Complex IS | 종합운동장사거리 | Munhwayesul-ro; Jonghapundongjang-ro | Anseong City | Daedeok-myeon | |
| Georisil Entrance | 거리실입구 | Georisil-gil | Anseong City | Bogae-myeon | |
| East Anseong IC | 동안성 나들목 | Sejong-Pocheon Expressway | Anseong City | Bogae-myeon | Under construction |
| Majeon Elementary School | 마전초등학교 | | Anseong City | Samjuk-myeon | |
| Mijang Culvert | 미장통로암거 | Sinmi 1-gil | Anseong City | Samjuk-myeon | |
| Dong-ah Institute of Media and Arts | 동아방송예술대학교 | | Anseong City | Samjuk-myeon | |
| No name | (이름 없음) | Prefectural Route 306; Prefectural Route 325 (Guksabong-ro) | Anseong City | Samjuk-myeon | Prefectural Route 306, 325 overlap |
| Samjuk IS | 삼죽삼거리 | Prefectural Route 306; Prefectural Route 325 (Samjuk-ro) | Anseong City | Samjuk-myeon | Prefectural Route 306, 325 overlap |
| Duhyeon Overpass | 두현육교 | Prefectural Route 70; Prefectural Route 82; Prefectural Route 306 (Jukju-ro); Neungap-gil | Anseong City | Juksan-myeon | |
| Duhyeon IS | 두현 교차로 | National Route 17 (Geolmi-ro); Prefectural Route 70; Prefectural Route 82; Prefectural Route 306 (Jukju-ro) | Anseong City | Juksan-myeon | National Route 17; Prefectural Route 70 overlap |
| Doowon Overpass | 두원육교 | Gwaneumdang-gil; Doowon Technical University College | Anseong City | Juksan-myeon | National Route 17; Prefectural Route 70 overlap |
| Jangwon Industrial Park IS | 장원산업단지교차로 | Jangwongongdan-gil | Anseong City | Juksan-myeon | National Route 17; Prefectural Route 70 overlap |
| Jeongwon Overpass | 정원육교 | Jangwonnamsan-gil | Anseong City | Juksan-myeon | National Route 17; Prefectural Route 70 overlap |
| Juksan IS | 죽산삼거리 | Prefectural Route 306 (Jukju-ro) | Anseong City | Juksan-myeon | National Route 17; Prefectural Route 70; Prefectural Route 306 overlap |
| Maesan IS | 매산삼거리 | National Route 17; Prefectural Route 70 (Jukyangdae-ro) | Anseong City | Juksan-myeon | National Route 17; Prefectural Route 70; Prefectural Route 306 overlap |
| Juksan Holy Ground Entrance IS | 죽산성지입구삼거리 | Jongbae-gil | Anseong City | Iljuk-myeon | Prefectural Route 306 overlap |
| Iljuk IC | 일죽 나들목 | Jungbu Expressway | Anseong City | Iljuk-myeon | Prefectural Route 306 overlap |
| Woljeong IS | 월정 교차로 | Prefectural Route 306 (Naedun-gil) | Anseong City | Iljuk-myeon | Prefectural Route 306 overlap |
| Iljuk High School | 일죽종합고앞 | | Anseong City | Iljuk-myeon | |
| Bongcheon IS Cheongmi Bridge | 송천사거리 청미교 | Juraebonjuk-ro; Iljuksindong-gil | Anseong City | Iljuk-myeon | |
| Sinheung 2 Culvert | 신흥2암거 | Prefectural Route 329 (Geumil-ro) | Anseong City | Iljuk-myeon | Prefectural Route 329 overlap |
| Neungguk IS | 능국삼거리 | Prefectural Route 329 (Noseong-ro) | Anseong City | Iljuk-myeon | Prefectural Route 329 overlap |
| Seolseong IS | 설성 교차로 | Prefectural Route 333 (Jinsangmi-ro) | Icheon City | Seolseong-myeon | |
| Jeyo IS | 제요 교차로 | Jinsangmi-ro | Icheon City | Janghowon-eup | |
| Jinam IC | 진암 나들목 | National Route 3 National Route 21; National Route 37 (Jungwondae-ro) | Icheon City | Janghowon-eup | National Route 37 overlap |
| Janghowon-eup Office Buwon High School | 장호원읍사무소 부원고등학교 | | Icheon City | Janghowon-eup | National Route 37 overlap |
| Jinam IS | 진암 교차로 | National Route 37 (Janggam-ro) (Gyeongchungdae-ro) | Icheon City | Janghowon-eup | National Route 37 overlap |
| Onam IS | 오남사거리 | Boksunga-ro | Icheon City | Janghowon-eup | |
| Janghowon Bridge | 장호원교 | | Icheon City | Janghowon-eup | |

- Expressway
  - Nearby Oseong IC

=== North Chungcheong Province ===
| Name | Hangul name | Connection | Location | | Note |
|---|---|---|---|---|---|
| Janghowon Bridge | 장호원교 | | Eumseong County | Gamgok-myeon | |
| Gamgok IS | 감곡사거리 | Eumseong-ro; Janggam-ro | Eumseong County | Gamgok-myeon | |
| Gungjang IS | 궁장 교차로 | Gagok-ro | Eumseong County | Gamgok-myeon | |
| Gamgok IC (Ogung IS) | 감곡 나들목 (오궁 교차로) | Jungbu Naeryuk Expressway | Eumseong County | Gamgok-myeon | |
| Gungjangcheon Bridge Ogap Bridge | 궁장천교 오갑교 | | Eumseong County | Gamgok-myeon | |
| Munchon IS | 문촌 교차로 | Jungganmal-gil | Eumseong County | Gamgok-myeon | |
| Angseong IS | 앙성 교차로 | Gagok-ro | Chungju City | Angseong-myeon | |
| Jidang Overpass | 지당육교 | Wapyeong 1-gil | Chungju City | Angseong-myeon | |
| Yulyang IS | 유량 교차로 | | Chungju City | Angseong-myeon | |
| Maryeon IS | 마련 교차로 | Gagok-ro | Chungju City | Angseong-myeon | |
| Neungam IS | 능암 교차로 | Gagok-ro | Chungju City | Angseong-myeon | |
| Daepyeongchon IS | 대평촌 교차로 | Gagok-ro | Chungju City | Angseong-myeon | |
| Sindae IS | 신대 교차로 | Myogongnaedong-gil | Chungju City | Jungangtap-myeon | |
| Goheung IS | 가흥 교차로 | Prefectural Route 599 (Cheomdansaneom-ro) | Chungju City | Jungangtap-myeon | |
| Mokgye Bridge | | | Chungju City | Jungangtap-myeon | |
| Mokgye Bridge | | Eomjeong-myeon | Chungju City | | |
| Yulneung IS | 율능 교차로 | Eomjeong-myeon | Chungju City | Gimsaeng-ro | |
| Hayeong IS (Hayeong Viaduct) | 하영 교차로 (하영고가교) | National Route 19 (Chungwondae-ro); Guryong-ro | Chungju City | Sancheok-myeon | |
| Sangyeong IS | 상영삼거리 | Cheondeungbakdal-ro | Chungju City | Sancheok-myeon | |
| Gancheok IS | 산척사거리 | Dongsal-ro | Chungju City | Sancheok-myeon | |
| Songgang IS | 송강 교차로 | Prefectural Route 531 (Cheondeungbakdal-ro) | Chungju City | Sancheok-myeon | |
| Sangsan IS | 상산 교차로 | Saetgangyeong-gil | Chungju City | Sancheok-myeon | |
| Daritjae Tunnel | | Approximately 1500m | Chungju City | Sancheok-myeon | |
| Daritjae Tunnel | | Approximately 1500m | Jecheon City | Baegun-myeon | |
| Sowol IS | 소월 교차로 | Cheondeungbakdal-ro | Jecheon City | Baegun-myeon | |
| Wonseo Bridge | 원서교 | | Jecheon City | Baegun-myeon | |
| Pyeongdong IS | 평동 교차로 | Prefectural Route 597 (Aeryeon-ro) | Jecheon City | Baegun-myeon | |
| Bakdaljae IS | 박달재 교차로 | Mojeong-gil; Bakdal-ro | Jecheon City | Baegun-myeon | |
| Bakdaljae Tunnel | | Approximately 1960m | Jecheon City | Baegun-myeon | |
| Bakdaljae Tunnel | | Approximately 1960m | Jecheon City | Bongyang-eup | |
| Wonbak IS | 원박사거리 | Bakdal-ro; Bukbu-ro 5-gil | Jecheon City | Bongyang-eup | |
| Gungjeon Entrance IS | 공전입구삼거리 | Uiam-ro; Bukbu-ro 6-gil | Jecheon City | Bongyang-eup | |
| Bongyangsupdam Village IS | 봉양숲담부락앞 교차로 | Bukbu-ro 6-gil | Jecheon City | Bongyang-eup | |
| Magok Entrance IS | 마곡입구삼거리 | Guksabong-ro | Jecheon City | Bongyang-eup | |
| Yeonbag IS | 연박삼거리 | Jupo-ro | Jecheon City | Bongyang-eup | |
| Bongyang Overpass | 봉양육교 | | Jecheon City | Bongyang-eup | |
| Jangpyeong IS | 장평삼거리 | National Route 5 (Jewon-ro) | Jecheon City | Bongyang-eup | National Route 5 overlap |
| Bongyang station | 봉양역 | | Jecheon City | Bongyang-eup | National Route 5 overlap |
| Gosan IS (Jecheon IC) | 고산 교차로 (제천 나들목) | Jungang Expressway | Jecheon City | Bongyang-eup | National Route 5 overlap |
| Gomo IS (Jecheon IC) | 고모 교차로 (제천 나들목) | Jungang Expressway | Jecheon City | Bongyang-eup | National Route 5 overlap |
| Sindong IS | 신동 교차로 | Naeto-ro; Jecheonbung-ro | Jecheon City | Yeongseo-dong | National Route 5 overlap |
| Myeongji IS | 명지 교차로 | Prefectural Route 82 (Cheongpungho-ro) | Jecheon City | Hwasan-dong | National Route 5 overlap |
| Gomyeong IS (Gomyeong Underpass) | 고명 교차로 (고명지하차도) | National Route 5 (Danyang-ro) | Jecheon City | Sinbaek-dong | National Route 5 overlap |
| Gomyeong Overpass | 고명육교 | | Jecheon City | Sinbaek-dong | |
| (Duhak IS) | (두학 교차로) | Prefectural Route 522 (Uibyeong-daero) | Jecheon City | Sinbaek-dong | |
| Dongmak IS | 동막 교차로 | Naeto-ro | Jecheon City | Songhak-myeon | |
| Songhak IS | 송학 교차로 | Mudo-gil | Jecheon City | Songhak-myeon | |
| Mudo IS | 무도 교차로 | Songhak-ro 8-gil | Jecheon City | Songhak-myeon | |
| Sagok Bridge | 사곡교 | | Jecheon City | Songhak-myeon | |
| Neureubjae Tunnel | 느릅재터널 | | Jecheon City | Songhak-myeon | Approximately 470m |

- Expressway

=== Gangwon Province ===
| Name | Hangul name | Connection | Location | | Note |
|---|---|---|---|---|---|
| Neureubjae Tunnel | 느릅재터널 | | Yeongwol County | Hanbando-myeon | Right tunnel: Approximately 440m Left tunnel: Approximately 470m |
| Ssangyong IS | 쌍용 교차로 | Songhak-ro | Yeongwol County | Hanbando-myeon | |
| Ssangyong 1 IS | 쌍용1 교차로 | Ssangyong-ro | Yeongwol County | Hanbando-myeon | |
| Ssangyong 2 IS | 쌍용2 교차로 | Yeongwol-ro | Yeongwol County | Hanbando-myeon | |
| Seonam Bridge | 서남교 | | Yeongwol County | Hanbando-myeon | |
| Changwon IS | 창원 교차로 | Prefectural Route 519 (Yeongwol-ro) | Yeongwol County | Nam-myeon | |
| Yeonjeong IS | 연정 교차로 | Hanbandon-ro | Yeongwol County | Hanbando-myeon | |
| Yeondang IS | 연당 교차로 | National Route 59; Prefectural Route 88 (Yeongwol-ro) (Jeondang-ro) | Yeongwol County | Nam-myeon | National Route 59 overlap Prefectural Route 88 overlap |
| Gakhan Tunnel | 각한터널 | | Yeongwol County | Nam-myeon | National Route 59 overlap Prefectural Route 88 overlap Right tunnel: Approximately 915m Left tunnel: Approximately 950m |
| Seondeul Bridge | | | Yeongwol County | Nam-myeon | National Route 31, 59 overlap |
| Seondeul Bridge | | | Yeongwol County | Yeongwol-eup | National Route 31, 59 overlap |
| Bangjeol Tunnel | 방절터널 | | Yeongwol County | Yeongwol-eup | National Route 59 overlap Prefectural Route 88 overlap Right tunnel: Approximately 205m Left tunnel: Approximately 200m |
| Seoyeongwol IS | 서영월 교차로 | Prefectural Route 88 (Yeongwoldong-ro) | Yeongwol County | Yeongwol-eup | National Route 59 overlap Prefectural Route 88 overlap |
| Yeongwol 1 Tunnel | 영월1터널 | | Yeongwol County | Yeongwol-eup | National Route 59 overlap Right tunnel: Approximately 461m Left tunnel: Approximately 350m |
| Jangneung Overpass | 장릉육교 | | Yeongwol County | Yeongwol-eup | National Route 59 overlap |
| Yeongwol 2 Tunnel | 영월2터널 | | Yeongwol County | Yeongwol-eup | National Route 59 overlap Right tunnel: Approximately 955m Left tunnel: Approximately 948m |
| Bongnae 1 Bridge | 봉래1교 | | Yeongwol County | Yeongwol-eup | National Route 59 overlap |
| Bongnae Tunnel | 봉래터널 | | Yeongwol County | Yeongwol-eup | National Route 59 overlap Right tunnel: Approximately 913m Left tunnel: Approximately 970m |
| Bongnae 2 Bridge Deokpo 1 Bridge Deokpo 2 Bridge | 봉래2교 덕포1교 덕포2교 | | Yeongwol County | Yeongwol-eup | National Route 59 overlap |
| Dongyeongwol IS | 동영월 교차로 | National Route 31 (Yeongwol-ro) | Yeongwol County | Yeongwol-eup | National Route 31, 59 overlap |
| Dupyeong Bridge Saetdol Bridge Bansong Bridge | 두평교 샛돌교 반송교 | | Yeongwol County | Yeongwol-eup | National Route 31, 59 overlap |
| Bansong Tunnel | 반송터널 | | Yeongwol County | Yeongwol-eup | National Route 31, 59 overlap Right tunnel: Approximately 265m Left tunnel: Approximately 220m |
| Yeonha IS | 연하 교차로 | Yeongwol-ro | Yeongwol County | Yeongwol-eup | National Route 31, 59 overlap |
| Yeonha Bridge | 연하대교 | | Yeongwol County | Yeongwol-eup | National Route 31, 59 overlap |
| Seokhang 1 Tunnel | | | Yeongwol County | Yeongwol-eup | National Route 31, 59 overlap Right tunnel: Approximately 980m Left tunnel: Approximately 990m |
| Seokhang 1 Tunnel | | | Yeongwol County | Jungdong-myeon | National Route 31, 59 overlap Right tunnel: Approximately 980m Left tunnel: Approximately 990m |
| Yeonsang Bridge | 연상교 | | Yeongwol County | Jungdong-myeon | National Route 31, 59 overlap |
| Seokhang 2 Tunnel | 석항2터널 | | Yeongwol County | Jungdong-myeon | National Route 31, 59 overlap Right tunnel: Approximately 325m Left tunnel: Approximately 404m |
| Seokhang IS | 석항 교차로 | National Route 31; Prefectural Route 28 (Yeongwol-ro) | Yeongwol County | Jungdong-myeon | National Route 31, 59 overlap Prefectural Route 28 overlap |
| Sindong IS | 신동 교차로 | Prefectural Route 421 (Uirim-ro) | Jeongseon County | Sindong-eup | National Route 59 overlap Prefectural Route 28 overlap |
| Yemi IS | 예미 교차로 | Donggang-ro; Uirim-ro | Jeongseon County | Sindong-eup | National Route 59 overlap Prefectural Route 28 overlap |
| Uirim IS | 의림삼거리 | Uirim-ro | Jeongseon County | Sindong-eup | National Route 59 overlap Prefectural Route 28 overlap |
| Rest area | | | Jeongseon County | Sindong-eup | National Route 59 overlap Prefectural Route 28 overlap |
| Rest area | | | Jeongseon County | Nam-myeon | National Route 59 overlap Prefectural Route 28 overlap |
| Mungok IS | 문곡 교차로 | National Route 59 (Chilhyeon-ro) | Jeongseon County | Nam-myeon | National Route 59 overlap Prefectural Route 28 overlap |
| Nammyeon IS | 남면 교차로 | Muneundan-ro | Jeongseon County | Nam-myeon | Prefectural Route 28 overlap |
| Mindungsan IS | 민둥산 교차로 | Prefectural Route 421 (Mindungsan-ro); Jamutgol-gil | Jeongseon County | Nam-myeon | Prefectural Route 28 overlap |
| Jeungsan IS | 증산 교차로 | Mureung 2-ro | Jeongseon County | Nam-myeon | Prefectural Route 28 overlap |
| Jeungsan Tunnel | 증산터널 | | Jeongseon County | Nam-myeon | Prefectural Route 28 overlap Right tunnel: Approximately 503m Left tunnel: Approximately 484m |
| Sabuk IS | 사북 교차로 | Prefectural Route 28 (Jijangcheon-ro); Sabuk 1-gil High 1-gil | Jeongseon County | Sabuk-ri | Prefectural Route 28 overlap |
| Sabuk 1 Tunnel | 사북1터널 | | Jeongseon County | Sabuk-ri | Right tunnel: Approximately 179m Left tunnel: Approximately 258m |
| Sabuk 2 Tunnel | | | Jeongseon County | Sabuk-ri | Right tunnel: Approximately 859m Left tunnel: Approximately 865m |
| Sabuk 2 Tunnel | | | Jeongseon County | Gohan-eup | Right tunnel: Approximately 859m Left tunnel: Approximately 865m |
| Bucheoso IS | 부처소 교차로 | Jijangcheon-ro | Jeongseon County | Gohan-eup | |
| Gohan IS | 고한 교차로 | Gohan-ro | Jeongseon County | Gohan-eup | |
| Gohan-eup Office | 고한읍사무소 | | Jeongseon County | Gohan-eup | |
| Gohan Tunnel | 고한터널 | | Jeongseon County | Gohan-eup | Right tunnel: Approximately 505m Left tunnel: Approximately 570m |
| Gallae IS | 갈래 교차로 | Gohan-ro | Jeongseon County | Gohan-eup | |
| Sanggallae IS | 상갈래 교차로 | Prefectural Route 414 (Hambaeksan-ro) | Jeongseon County | Gohan-eup | |
| Dumundongjae IS | 두문동재삼거리 | Geumdaebong-gil | Jeongseon County | Gohan-eup | |
| Dumundongjae Tunnel Dumundongjae 2 Tunnel | | | Jeongseon County | Gohan-eup | Approximately 1,363m Approximately 2,470m |
| Dumundongjae Tunnel Dumundongjae 2 Tunnel | | | Taebaek City | Samsoo-dong | Approximately 1,363m Approximately 2,470m |
| Yongsu Bridge | 용수교 | | Taebaek City | Samsoo-dong | |
| Yongyeon IS | 용연삼거리 | Yongyeon Cave | Taebaek City | Samsoo-dong | |
| Chujeon Station IS | 추전역삼거리 | Ssaribat-gil | Taebaek City | Samsoo-dong | |
| Hwajeon Elementary School | 화전초등학교 | | Taebaek City | Samsoo-dong | |
| No name | (이름 없음) | Gowon-ro | Taebaek City | Samsoo-dong | |
| Hwajeon IS | 화전사거리 | National Route 35 (Baekdudaegan-ro); Hwangji-ro | Taebaek City | Samsoo-dong | National Route 35 overlap |
| Taeseo Elementary School Hwangji Joongang Elementary School Taebaek City Health Center | 태서초등학교 황지중앙초등학교 태백시보건소 | | Taebaek City | Hwangyeon-dong | National Route 35 overlap |
| Hwangji Bridge IS | 황지교사거리 | National Route 35 (Taebaek-ro) | Taebaek City | Hwangyeon-dong | National Route 35 overlap |
| Bus stop | 송이재 | | Taebaek City | Hwangyeon-dong | |
| No name | (이름 없음) | Dongtaebaeng-ro | Taebaek City | Hwangyeon-dong | |
| Tongli IS | 통리삼거리 | Prefectural Route 427 (Munuijae-ro) | Taebaek City | Hwangyeon-dong | |
| Switch back | 스위치빽쉼터 | | Samcheok City | Dogye-eup | |
| Nahanjeong Station (Pyeyeok) | 나한정역(폐역) | | Samcheok City | Dogye-eup | |
| Heungjeon IS | 흥전 교차로 | Heungjeonseo-gil | Samcheok City | Dogye-eup | |
| Dogye 1 Tunnel | 도계1터널 | | Samcheok City | Dogye-eup | Approximately 1765m |
| Dogye 2 Tunnel | 도계2터널 | | Samcheok City | Dogye-eup | Approximately 1077m |
| Dowon IS | 도원 교차로 | | Samcheok City | Dogye-eup | |
| Neukgu 2 IS | 늑구2 교차로 | Prefectural Route 424 (Geonuiryeong-ro) | Samcheok City | Dogye-eup | |
| Gosa IS | 고사 교차로 | | Samcheok City | Dogye-eup | |
| Sodal IS | 소달 교차로 | | Samcheok City | Dogye-eup | |
| Gosa 1 Tunnel | 고사1터널 | | Samcheok City | Dogye-eup | Approximately 595m |
| Gosa 2 Tunnel | 고사2터널 | | Samcheok City | Dogye-eup | Approximately 625m |
| Chagu Tunnel | 차구터널 | | Samcheok City | Dogye-eup | Approximately 340m |
| Macha 1 Tunnel | 마차1터널 | | Samcheok City | Dogye-eup | Approximately 460m |
| Macha IS | 마차 교차로 | | Samcheok City | Singi-myeon | |
| Macha 2 Tunnel | 마차2터널 | | Samcheok City | Singi-myeon | Approximately 240m |
| Daepyeong IS | 대평 교차로 | Daepyeong-gil | Samcheok City | Singi-myeon | |
| Daepyeong Tunnel | 대평터널 | | Samcheok City | Singi-myeon | Approximately 212m |
| Singi Tunnel | 신기터널 | | Samcheok City | Singi-myeon | Approximately 590m |
| Cheongi Tunnel | 천기터널 | | Samcheok City | Singi-myeon | Approximately 2235m |
| Cheongi Tunnel | | | Samcheok City | Miro-myeon | Approximately 2235m |
| Cheongi 2 Tunnel | 천기2터널 | | Samcheok City | Miro-myeon | Approximately 165m |
| Sangjeong Tunnel | 상정터널 | | Samcheok City | Miro-myeon | Approximately 495m |
| Hajeong IS | 하정 교차로 | Prefectural Route 28 (Gangwonnambu-ro) | Samcheok City | Miro-myeon | Prefectural Route 28 overlap |
| Sanggeono Bridge | 상거노교 | | Samcheok City | Miro-myeon | Prefectural Route 28 overlap |
| Miro IS | 미로 교차로 | Mirogangbyeon-ro | Samcheok City | Miro-myeon | Prefectural Route 28 overlap |
| Miro Bridge | 미로교 | | Samcheok City | Miro-myeon | Prefectural Route 28 overlap |
| Musa Bridge | | | Samcheok City | Miro-myeon | Prefectural Route 28 overlap |
| Musa Bridge | | | Samcheok City | Seongnae-dong | Prefectural Route 28 overlap |
| Dogyeong IS | 도경 교차로 | Gangwonnambu-ro; Osipcheon-ro | Samcheok City | Seongnae-dong | Prefectural Route 28 overlap |
| Danbong IS | 단봉삼거리 | National Route 7 (Donghae-daero) | Donghae City | Bukpyeong-dong | Terminus; Prefectural Route 28 overlap |

- Expressway
