= National Route 13 (South Korea) =

Road in South Korea

National Route 13
- 국도 제13호선

Route information
- Length: 308.9 km (191.9 mi)
- Existed: 31 August 1971–present

Major junctions
- South end: Wando County, South Jeolla Province
- North end: Geumsan County, South Chungcheong Province

Location
- Country: South Korea

Highway system
- Highway systems of South Korea; Expressways; National; Local
← National Route 12	→ National Route 14

National Route 13 (Korean: 국도 제13호선; RR: gukdo je13hoseon) is a national highway in South Korea connects Wando County to Geumsan County. It established on 31 August 1971.

== History ==
- August 31, 1971: Designated as National Route 13 under the National Highway Route Designation Decree.
- August 3, 1972: Road section in Deokjin-ri, Deokjin-myeon, Yeongam-gun reduced from 550m to 486m due to road improvement.
- March 14, 1981: Extended the terminus from Gwangju, Jeollanam-do to Damyang-eup, Damyang-gun, Jeollanam-do.
- May 30, 1981: Road section changed to 34 km according to the amendment of Presidential Decree No. 10247.
- August 17, 1981: Opened 48.297 km section from Seongbuk-ri, Naju-eup, Naju-gun to Songjeong-ri, Songjeong-eup, Gwangsan-gun to Gaeksa-ri, Damyang-eup, Damyang-gun, upgraded to national road.
- January 19, 1993: Opened Namchang bypass (Namchang-ri, Bukpyeong-myeon, Haenam-gun) 980m section.
- January 18, 1994: Opened expanded sections: Naju to Songjeong road (Sanjeong-dong, Naju-si, Jeollanam-do to Woljeon-dong, Gwangsan-gu, Gwangju) 12.4 km; Songjeong bypass (Sinchon-dong to Woljeon-dong, Gwangsan-gu, Gwangju) 3.5 km.
- June 10, 1999: Opened Namchang Bridge (Wondong-ri, Gunoe-myeon, Wando-gun ~ Namchang-ri, Bukpyeong-myeon, Haenam-gun) 560m, old 230m section closed.
- January 1, 2001: Opened expanded Seongjeon to Yeongam road (Songwol-ri, Seongjeon-myeon, Gangjin-gun ~ Nampung-ri, Yeongam-eup, Yeongam-gun) 14.1 km; closed old 3.6 km section (Wolnam-ri, Seongjeon-myeon, Gangjin-gun ~ Haksong-ri, Yeongam-eup, Yeongam-gun).
- August 3, 2001: Opened expanded Haenam to Okcheon road (Namoe-ri, Haenam-eup, Haenam-gun ~ Yeongsin-ri, Okcheon-myeon) 12.2 km.
- August 25, 2001: Extended the terminus from Damyang-eup, Damyang-gun, Jeollanam-do to Geumsan-eup, Geumsan-gun, Chungcheongnam-do.
- October 15, 2001: Opened 14.6 km section from Sindong-ri, Namil-myeon, Geumsan-gun to Haok-ri, Geumsan-eup, upgraded to national road.
- November 8, 2002: Opened expanded sections: Yeongsin-ri, Okcheon-myeon, Haenam-gun ~ Wolpyeong-ri, Seongjeon-myeon, Gangjin-gun 14.16 km; Mangho-ri ~ Yongheung-ri, Yeongam-eup, Yeongam-gun 3.04 km.
- February 10, 2003: Reconstructed Eumdae Bridge (Sincheon-ri, Namil-myeon, Geumsan-gun ~ Eumdae-ri) 370m.
- April 24, 2006: Partially opened Pungsu-ri, Subuk-myeon, Damyang-gun ~ Samda-ri, Damyang-eup, 1.4 km.
- April 23, 2007: Partially opened Daechi-ri, Daejeon-myeon, Damyang-gun ~ Baekdong-ri, Damyang-eup, 8.7 km.
- August 31, 2007: Opened expanded Samsan ~ Haenam road (Gohyeon-ri, Hyeonsan-myeon, Haenam-gun ~ Yongjeong-ri, Haenam-eup) 10.7 km, old section closed.
- January 1, 2008: Opened section from Wolchul-dong, Buk-gu, Gwangju to Baekdong-ri, Damyang-eup, Damyang-gun; old section closed.
- December 30, 2008: Opened expanded section from Gayong-ri, Wando-eup ~ Bulmok-ri, Gunoe-myeon, Wando-gun 10.22 km; old 10.5 km section closed.
- January 12, 2009: Designated Wando ~ Gunoe ~ Namchang road (Jukcheong-ri, Wando-eup ~ Wondong-ri, Gunoe-myeon) 12.5 km as motorway.
- January 14, 2009: Opened expanded Jasan-ri, Donghyang-myeon, Jinan-gun ~ Singoe-ri, Ancheon-myeon, 2.3 km; old 1.94 km section closed.
- May 2, 2011: Early opening of 5.4 km expanded section from Bulmok-ri to Wondong-ri, Gunoe-myeon, Wando-gun.
- January 11, 2012: Opened expanded 2.93 km section of Namwon ~ Gokseong road, Osan ~ Gyeom-myeon (Yeonhwa-ri, Osan-myeon, Gokseong-gun ~ Pyeongjang-ri, Gyeom-myeon), old 2.6 km section closed.
- March 29, 2012: Opened Wando Bridge (Wondong-ri, Gunoe-myeon, Wando-gun) 2.35 km.
- September 27, 2012: Opened expanded section from Namchang-ri, Bukpyeong-myeon, Haenam-gun ~ Gohyeon-ri, Hyeonsan-myeon, 12.76 km; old 10.28 km section closed.
- March 27, 2015: Changed terminus from Geumsan-eup, Geumsan-gun to Yangjeon Samgeori, Geumsung-myeon.
- November 20, 2017: Opened expanded Okgwa ~ Jeokseong road (Changjeong-ri, Ip-myeon, Gokseong-gun ~ Songdae-ri, Daegang-myeon, Namwon-si) 8.28 km; old 7.147 km section (Shindeok-ri ~ Songdae-ri, Daegang-myeon, Namwon-si) closed.
- April 7, 2022: Upgraded section of Damyang ~ Gokseong road (Orye-ri, Mujeong-myeon, Damyang-gun ~ Yeonhwa-ri, Osan-myeon, Gokseong-gun) 3.9 km; old 300 m section (Ungok-ri, Osan-myeon, Gokseong-gun) closed.

== Main stopovers ==
South Jeolla Province

- Wando County - Haenam County - Gangjin County - Yeongam County - Naju

Gwangju

- Gwangsan District - Buk District

South Jeolla Province

- Damyang County - Gokseong County

North Jeolla Province

- Namwon - Sunchang County - Imsil County - Jangsu County - Jinan County

South Chungcheong Province

- Geumsan County

== Major intersections ==
- (■): Motorway

IS: Intersection, IC: Interchange

=== South Jeolla Province (South Gwangju) ===
Name	Hangul name	Connection	Location		Note
Connected with Prefectural Route 13
Wando IS	완도 교차로	National Route 77; Prefectural Route 13 (Wando-ro) (Jangbogo-daero)	Wando County	Wando-eup	Terminus
Eommok IS	엄목 교차로	Nonggongdanji-gil	Wando County	Wando-eup	
Jangjwa IS	장좌 교차로	Cheonghaejin-ro	Wando County	Wando-eup	
Wando Tunnel	완도터널		Wando County	Wando-eup	Right tunnel: Approximately 411m Left tunnel: Approximately 403m
Wando Tunnel			Wando County	Gunoe-myeon	Right tunnel: Approximately 411m Left tunnel: Approximately 403m
Bulmok IS	불목 교차로	Cheonghaejinbung-ro	Wando County	Gunoe-myeon	
Gyoin IS	교인 교차로	Cheonghaejinbung-ro	Wando County	Gunoe-myeon	
Wondong IS	원동 교차로	National Route 77 (Cheonghaejinseo-ro); Cheonghaejin-ro	Wando County	Gunoe-myeon	National Route 77 overlap
Wando Bridge	완도대교		Wando County	Gunoe-myeon	National Route 77 overlap
Daldo IS	달도 교차로	Cheonghaejin-ro	Wando County	Gunoe-myeon	National Route 77 overlap
Namchang Bridge	남창교		Wando County	Gunoe-myeon	National Route 77 overlap
Namchang Bridge			Haenam County	Bukpyeong-myeon	National Route 77 overlap
Namchang IS	남창 교차로	National Route 77 (Ttangkkeutaean-ro); Prefectural Route 55 (Baek-doro)	Haenam County	Bukpyeong-myeon	National Route 77 overlap
Hwangsan IS	황산 교차로	Hyeonsanbukpyeong-ro	Haenam County	Hyeonsan-myeon	
Seongmae IS	성매 교차로	Prefectural Route 806 (Ttangkkeutaean-ro)	Haenam County	Hyeonsan-myeon	Prefectural Route 806 overlap
Godam IS	고담 교차로	Baekbangsan-gil	Haenam County	Hyeonsan-myeon	Prefectural Route 806 overlap
Godam IS	고담삼거리	Hyeonsanbukpyeong-ro	Haenam County	Hyeonsan-myeon	Prefectural Route 806 overlap
Gohyeon IS	고현삼거리	Hyeonsanbukpyeong-ro	Haenam County	Hyeonsan-myeon	Prefectural Route 806 overlap
Gusi IS	구시 교차로	Prefectural Route 806 (Gosan-ro); Haenamhwasan-ro	Haenam County	Hyeonsan-myeon	Prefectural Route 806 overlap
Gusi IS	구시 간이교차로	Osigol-gil	Haenam County	Hyeonsan-myeon	
Gusi Tunnel	구시터널		Haenam County	Hyeonsan-myeon	Approximately 630m
Gusi Tunnel			Haenam County	Samsan-myeon	Approximately 630m
Hwasan-myeon approach road	화산면진입로	Haenamhwasan-ro	Haenam County	Samsan-myeon	
Samhwa IS	삼화 교차로	Bukbu-gil	Haenam County	Samsan-myeon	
Samsan Bridge	삼산교		Haenam County	Samsan-myeon	
Andong IS	안동 간이교차로	Haenamhwasan-ro	Haenam County	Haenam-eup	
Haenam IS	해남 교차로	National Route 18 (Gongnyong-daero)	Haenam County	Haenam-eup	National Route 18 overlap
Pyeongdong IS	평동 교차로	Prefectural Route 806 (Gosan-ro)	Haenam County	Haenam-eup	National Route 18 overlap
Sinan IS	신안 교차로	Yeongbin-ro	Haenam County	Haenam-eup	National Route 18 overlap
Haenam Tunnel	해남터널		Haenam County	Haenam-eup	National Route 18 overlap Approximately 620m
Haenam Tunnel			Haenam County	Okcheon-myeon	National Route 18 overlap Approximately 620m
Songun IS	송운 교차로	National Route 18 (Haenam-ro)	Haenam County	Okcheon-myeon	National Route 18 overlap
Yeongsin IS	영신 교차로	Haenam-ro	Haenam County	Okcheon-myeon	
Singye IS	신계 교차로	Prefectural Route 819 (Heukseok-ro)	Haenam County	Okcheon-myeon	
Deokjeong IS	덕정 교차로	Haenam-ro	Haenam County	Gyegok-myeon	
Beopgok IS	법곡 교차로	Haenam-ro	Haenam County	Gyegok-myeon	
Seonjin IS	선진 교차로	Haenam-ro	Haenam County	Gyegok-myeon	
Wolsan IS	월산 교차로	National Route 2 (Noksaek-ro)	Gangjin County	Seongjeon-myeon	National Route 2 overlap
Wolpyeong IS	월평 교차로	National Route 2 (Noksaek-ro)	Gangjin County	Seongjeon-myeon	National Route 2 overlap
No name	(이름 없음)	Nokhyangwolchon-gil	Gangjin County	Seongjeon-myeon	
Sinpung IS	신풍삼거리	Muwisa-ro	Gangjin County	Seongjeon-myeon	
Wolnam IS	월남 교차로	Samun-ro	Gangjin County	Seongjeon-myeon	
No name	(이름 없음)	Prefectural Route 827	Gangjin County	Seongjeon-myeon	
Pulchi Tunnel	풀치터널		Gangjin County	Seongjeon-myeon	Right tunnel: Approximately 390m Left tunnel: Approximately 455m
Pulchi Tunnel			Yeongam County	Yeongam-eup	Right tunnel: Approximately 390m Left tunnel: Approximately 455m
No name	(이름 없음)	Bansongjeong-gil	Yeongam County	Yeongam-eup	
Jangheung IS	장흥 교차로	Prefectural Route 835 (Janggang-ro)	Yeongam County	Yeongam-eup	
Cheonhwangsa IS	천황사 교차로	Cheonhwangsa-ro	Yeongam County	Yeongam-eup	
Chunyang IS	춘양 교차로	Nangju-ro	Yeongam County	Yeongam-eup	
Yeongam IC	영암 나들목	Prefectural Route 819 (Yeounjae-ro)	Yeongam County	Yeongam-eup	
No name	(이름 없음)	Nangju-ro	Yeongam County	Yeongam-eup	
Deokjin-myeon Office	덕진면사무소		Yeongam County	Deokjin-myeon	
Deokjin Elementary School IS	덕진초교사거리	Wolchul-ro; Baegunseon-ro	Yeongam County	Deokjin-myeon	
Cheongrim IS	청림삼거리	Seorideung-ro	Yeongam County	Deokjin-myeon	
Juam IS	주암삼거리	Wonsan-ro	Yeongam County	Sinbuk-myeon	
Gujangteo IS	구장터삼거리	Hosan-ro	Yeongam County	Sinbuk-myeon	
Yeongam Electronic Science High School Entrance	신북전자공고입구	Hwanggeumdong-ro	Yeongam County	Sinbuk-myeon	
Sinbuk Intercity Bus Terminal	신북시외버스터미널		Yeongam County	Sinbuk-myeon	
Ojangseong Entrance	오장성입구	Deulsori-ro	Yeongam County	Sinbuk-myeon	
Wongeumsu Entrance	원금수입구	Geumgyo-ro	Yeongam County	Sinbuk-myeon	
Agro-industrial complex IS	농공단지교차로	Sinbukgongdan-ro	Naju City	Seji-myeon	
Jukdong IS	죽동삼거리	Prefectural Route 820 (Seji-ro)	Naju City	Seji-myeon	Prefectural Route 820 overlap
No name	(이름 없음)	Seokgo-gil; Sinwonbonghak-gil	Naju City	Wanggok-myeon	Prefectural Route 820 overlap
Sangsama-eul	상사마을앞	Singasinwon-gil	Naju City	Wanggok-myeon	Prefectural Route 820 overlap
Yangsan IS	양산삼거리	Prefectural Route 820 (Gobun-ro)	Naju City	Wanggok-myeon	Prefectural Route 820 overlap
Wanggok IS	왕곡 교차로	National Route 1 Prefectural Route 49; Prefectural Route 60 (Bitgaramjangseong-ro)	Naju City	Wanggok-myeon	
Jangsan IS (Jangsan Overpass)	장산사거리 (장산고가교)	National Route 23 (Najuseobu-ro)	Naju City	Wanggok-myeon	National Route 23 overlap
Ungok Bridge	운곡교		Naju City	Wanggok-myeon	National Route 23 overlap
Ichangtaekji IS	이창택지삼거리	Pungmulsijang 1-gil	Naju City	Ichang-dong	National Route 23 overlap
Yeongsanpo Public Bus Terminal	영산포공용버스터미널		Naju City	Ichang-dong	National Route 23 overlap
Ichang-dong IS	이창동삼거리	National Route 23 (Geumyeong-ro)	Naju City	Ichang-dong	National Route 23 overlap
Yeongsan-dong Community Center	영산동주민센터		Naju City	Yeongsan-dong	
Yeongsan Bridge	영산대교		Naju City	Yeongsan-dong	
Yeongsan Bridge			Naju City	Yeonggang-dong	
Yeonggang IS	영강사거리	Yeongsanpo-ro	Naju City	Yeonggang-dong	
Naju Station IS	나주역앞 교차로	Najuyeok-gil	Naju City	Songwol-dong	
Naju City Hall	나주시청앞	Bitgaram-ro; Sicheong-gil	Naju City	Songwol-dong	
KT Corporation IS	한국통신 교차로	Naju-ro; Sagyeokjang-gil	Naju City	Songwol-dong	
Naju Tax Office Naju City Culture and Arts Center	나주세무서 나주시문화예술회관		Naju City	Songwol-dong	
Naju Fire Station IS	나주소방서앞삼거리	Namgomun-ro	Naju City	Songwol-dong	
No name	(이름 없음)	Yeongsan-ro	Naju City	Geumnam-dong	
Sanjeong IS	산정삼거리	Yeongsan-ro	Naju City	Geumnam-dong	
Geumseong Middle School Geumseong Elementary School Naju Technical High School	금성중학교 금성고등학교 나주공업고등학교		Naju City	Seongbuk-dong	
Jeonglyeolsa Entrance	정렬사입구	Daeho-gil; Jeongnyeolsa-gil	Naju City	Seongbuk-dong	
Dongshin University IS	동신대앞 교차로	Prefectural Route 822 (Noansamdo-ro)	Naju City	Seongbuk-dong	
Seokhyeon IS	석현삼거리	Cheongdong-gil	Naju City	Seongbuk-dong	
Noan IS	노안삼거리	Noan-ro	Naju City	Noan-myeon	
Noannam Elementary School	노안남초등학교		Naju City	Noan-myeon	
Munhwama-eul IS	문화마을 교차로	Munhwa-gil	Naju City	Noan-myeon	
Yongsanma-eul IS	용산마을앞 교차로	Haksanyongsan-gil	Naju City	Noan-myeon	Continuation into Gwangju

=== Gwangju ===
Name	Hangul name	Connection	Location		Note
Bondeok IC	본덕 나들목	Prefectural Route 49 (Bitgaramjangseong-ro)	Gwangju	Gwangsan District	South Jeolla Province - Gwangju border line
Hasan Bridge	하산교	Donggong-ro 185beon-gil	Gwangju	Gwangsan District	
No name	(이름 없음)	Pyeongdongsandan-ro	Gwangju	Gwangsan District	
No name	(이름 없음)	Donggok-ro; Pyeongdongsandan 6beon-ro	Gwangju	Gwangsan District	
Songjeong 2 Bridge	송정2교		Gwangju	Gwangsan District	
Dosan Elementary School	도산초등학교		Gwangju	Gwangsan District	
No name	(이름 없음)	Songjeong-ro	Gwangju	Gwangsan District	
No name	(이름 없음)	Naesang-ro	Gwangju	Gwangsan District	
Dongbu Police Box IS	동부파출소앞삼거리		Gwangju	Gwangsan District	
Songdo-ro Entrance IS	송도로입구 교차로	National Route 22 (Sangmu-daero)	Gwangju	Gwangsan District	
Songjeong IC	송정 나들목	National Route 22 (Sangmu-daero)	Gwangju	Gwangsan District	
No name	(이름 없음)	Geumbong-ro	Gwangju	Gwangsan District	
Usan IS	우산사거리	Usan-ro	Gwangju	Gwangsan District	
Gwangsan Middle School	광산중학교		Gwangju	Gwangsan District	
(Hanam 2 Underpass)	(하남2지하차도)	Mujin-daero	Gwangju	Gwangsan District	
Eodeung Elementary School	어등초등학교	Wolgoksanjeong-ro	Gwangju	Gwangsan District	
Saam-ro Entrance IS	사암로입구 교차로	Mokryeon-ro	Gwangju	Gwangsan District	
Daeban Elementary School	대반초등학교		Gwangju	Gwangsan District	
Heukseok IS	흑석사거리	Hanam-daero	Gwangju	Gwangsan District	
Industrial Complex IS	산단관리소사거리	Jangsin-ro	Gwangju	Gwangsan District	
Hanamsandan 6beon-doro	하남산단6번도로	Hanamsandan 6beon-ro	Gwangju	Gwangsan District	
Sandan 7beon-ro Entrance	산단7번로입구	Hanamsandan 7beon-ro	Gwangju	Gwangsan District	
Sandan 9 beon-doro Entrance	산단9번로입구	Hanamsandan 9beon-ro	Gwangju	Gwangsan District	
Gwangsan IC (Gwangsan IS)	광산 나들목 (광산 교차로)	Honam Expressway; National Route 1 (Bungmun-daero)	Gwangju	Gwangsan District	
Bia Underpass	비아지하보차도		Gwangju	Gwangsan District	
Cheomdan Complex IS	첨단단지 교차로	Cheomdanjungang-ro	Gwangju	Gwangsan District	
Gwangju Institute of Science and Technology Ssangam Park Electronics and Telecommunications Research Institute	광주과학기술원 쌍암공원 한국전자통신연구원		Gwangju	Buk District	
No name	(이름 없음)	Cheomdangwagi-ro; Aemko-ro	Gwangju	Buk District	
Gwangju National Science Museum	국립광주과학관		Gwangju	Buk District	
Gwangju Rehabilitation Training Center Eunhye School	광주재활훈련원앞 은혜학교	Samso-ro	Gwangju	Buk District	
Wolchul IS	월출 교차로	Samso-ro; Bitgoeul-daero; Chuseong-ro	Gwangju	Buk District	Continuation into South Jeolla Province

=== South Jeolla Province (North Gwangju) ===
Name	Hangul name	Connection	Location		Note
Sillyong IS	신룡 교차로	Sillyong-gil	Damyang County	Daejeon-myeon	Gwangju - South Jeolla Province border line
North Gwangju IC (North Gwangju IS)	북광주 나들목 (북광주 교차로)	Gochang-Damyang Expressway	Damyang County	Daejeon-myeon	
Jungok IS	중옥 교차로	Jungok-gil	Damyang County	Daejeon-myeon	
Daechi Is	대치 교차로	Daejeon-ro	Damyang County	Daejeon-myeon	
Wolbon IS	월본사거리	National Route 24; Prefectural Route 898 (Byeongpung-ro)	Damyang County	Daejeon-myeon	National Route 24 overlap
Seongsan IS	성산사거리	Deokjinoksan-gil; Seongsan-gil	Damyang County	Daejeon-myeon	National Route 24 overlap
Goseong IS	고성사거리	Goridae-gil	Damyang County	Subuk-myeon	National Route 24 overlap
Subuk IS	수북사거리	Hansudong-ro	Damyang County	Subuk-myeon	National Route 24 overlap
Pungsu IS	풍수사거리	Dongsang-gil	Damyang County	Subuk-myeon	National Route 24 overlap
Pungsu Bridge	풍수교		Damyang County	Subuk-myeon	National Route 24 overlap
Jupyeong IS	주평사거리	Gasan-gil; Misan-gil	Damyang County	Subuk-myeon	National Route 24 overlap
Samda Bridge	삼다교		Damyang County	Damyang-eup	National Route 24 overlap
Yanggak IS (Damyang Fire Station)	양각사거리 (담양소방서)	National Route 24; Prefectural Route 15 (Jukhyangmunhwa-ro)	Damyang County	Damyang-eup	National Route 24 overlap Prefectural Route 15 overlap
Damyang Bridge	담양교	Prefectural Route 887 (Cheonbyeon 5-gil)	Damyang County	Damyang-eup	Prefectural Route 15, 887 overlap
Jungpa IS	중파사거리	National Route 29 (Chuseong-ro)	Damyang County	Damyang-eup	National Route 15, National Route 29 overlap Prefectural Route 15, 887 overlap
Damyang Public Bus Terminal	담양공용버스터미널		Damyang County	Damyang-eup	National Route 15, National Route 29 overlap Prefectural Route 15, 887 overlap
Dongun IS	동운삼거리	Jichim 6-gil	Damyang County	Damyang-eup	National Route 15, National Route 29 overlap Prefectural Route 15, 887 overlap
Damyang-eup IS	담양읍삼거리	National Route 24; Prefectural Route 55 (Jukhyang-daero)	Damyang County	Damyang-eup	National Route 15, National Route 24, National Route 29 overlap Prefectural Route 15, 55, 887 overlap
Baekdong IS	백동사거리	National Route 24 (Jukhyangmunhwa-ro); National Route 29; Prefectural Route 55 (Jukhyang-daero)	Damyang County	Damyang-eup	National Route 15, National Route 24, National Route 29 overlap Prefectural Route 15, 55, 887 overlap
Damyang Police Station	담양경찰서		Damyang County	Damyang-eup	National Route 15 overlap Prefectural Route 15, 887 overlap
Mujeong-myeon Office	무정면사무소		Damyang County	Mujeong-myeon	National Route 15 overlap Prefectural Route 15, 887 overlap
Anpyeong Entrance	안평입구	Prefectural Route 897 (Byeongmong-ro)	Damyang County	Mujeong-myeon	National Route 15 overlap Prefectural Route 15, 887 overlap
No name	(이름 없음)	Prefectural Route 887 (Pyeongjijeongseok-gil)	Damyang County	Mujeong-myeon	National Route 15 overlap Prefectural Route 15, 887 overlap
Orye IS	오례삼거리	Prefectural Route 60 (Changpyeonghyeon-ro)	Damyang County	Mujeong-myeon	National Route 15 overlap Prefectural Route 15, 60 overlap
Osan IS	오산삼거리	Osan-ro	Gokseong County	Osan-myeon	National Route 15 overlap Prefectural Route 15, 60 overlap
Okgwa IC (Osan IS)	옥과 나들목 (오산 교차로)	Honam Expressway; National Route 15; Prefectural Route 15 (Osan-ro)	Gokseong County	Osan-myeon	National Route 15 overlap Prefectural Route 15, 60 overlap
Sewol Bridge	세월교		Gokseong County	Osan-myeon	Prefectural Route 60 overlap
Yongdu IS	용두 교차로	Yongdu-gil	Gokseong County	Okgwa-myeon	Prefectural Route 60 overlap
Rimun IS	리문 교차로	Cheonbyeon-ro	Gokseong County	Okgwa-myeon	Prefectural Route 60 overlap
Pyeongjang IS	평장삼거리	National Route 27; Prefectural Route 60 (Goksun-ro)	Gokseong County	Okgwa-myeon	National Route 27 overlap Prefectural Route 60 overlap
Muchang IS	무창 교차로	National Route 27 (Goksun-ro)	Gokseong County	Okgwa-myeon	National Route 27 overlap
Okgwakian CC	옥과기안CC		Gokseong County	Okgwa-myeon	
Changjeong IS	창정삼거리	Songjeon-ro	Gokseong County	Ip-myeon	
Changjeong IS	창정사거리	Prefectural Route 840 (Geumho-gil)	Gokseong County	Ip-myeon	
(Unnamed Bridge)	(이름 미정 교량)		Gokseong County	Ip-myeon	Under construction Continuation into North Jeolla Province

=== North Jeolla Province ===
Name	Hangul name	Connection	Location		Note
(Unnamed Bridge)	(이름 미정 교량)		Namwon City	Daegang-myeon	Under construction South Jeolla Province - North Jeolla Province border line
Seokchon IS	석촌삼거리	Prefectural Route 730 (Seomjin-ro)	Namwon City	Daegang-myeon	Prefectural Route 730 overlap
Daegang-myeon Office Daegang Elementary School	대강면사무소 대강초등학교		Namwon City	Daegang-myeon	National Route 21 overlap Prefectural Route 730 overlap
No name	(이름 없음)	Prefectural Route 745 (Geumtan-ro)	Namwon City	Daegang-myeon	National Route 21 overlap Prefectural Route 730 overlap
Pyeongchon IS	평촌삼거리	Prefectural Route 730 (Yudeung-ro)	Namwon City	Daegang-myeon	National Route 21 overlap Prefectural Route 730 overlap
Suhong IS	수홍삼거리	National Route 24 (Bihong-ro)	Namwon City	Daegang-myeon	National Route 21, National Route 24 overlap
Goejeong IS	괴정삼거리	National Route 24 (Damsun-ro)	Sunchang County	Jeokseong-myeon	National Route 21, National Route 24 overlap
Seoho Bridge (Seohyo Bridge)	서호다리(서효교)		Sunchang County	Jeokseong-myeon	National Route 21 overlap
Hyeonpo IS	현포삼거리	Donggye-ro	Sunchang County	Donggye-myeon	National Route 21 overlap
Yeonsan IS	연산사거리	National Route 21; Prefectural Route 717 (Gangdong-ro); Donggye 1-gil	Sunchang County	Donggye-myeon	National Route 21 overlap
Jangdong IS	장동삼거리	Juwol-gil	Sunchang County	Donggye-myeon	
No name	(이름 없음)	Prefectural Route 745 (Imsam-ro)	Imsil County	Samgye-myeon	
Samgye-myeon Office	삼계면사무소		Imsil County	Samgye-myeon	
Deokgye IS	덕계사거리	Nosan-ro	Imsil County	Samgye-myeon	
Osu Station	오수역		Imsil County	Osu-myeon	
Osu Bridge Osu IS	오수교 오수사거리	Osu-ro	Imsil County	Osu-myeon	
Osu-myeon Office	오수면사무소		Imsil County	Osu-myeon	
Imsil County Library Osu Elementary School	임실군립도서관 오수초등학교		Imsil County	Osu-myeon	
Namak IS	남악 교차로	National Route 17 (Chunhyang-ro)	Imsil County	Osu-myeon	
Jisa-myeon Office Jisa Middle School	지사면사무소 지사중학교		Imsil County	Jisa-myeon	
Sijang IS	시장삼거리	Prefectural Route 721 (Sanseong-ro)	Jangsu County	Sanseo-myeon	Prefectural Route 721 overlap
Sanseo IS	산서삼거리	Prefectural Route 721 (Bosan-ro)	Jangsu County	Sanseo-myeon	Prefectural Route 721 overlap
Wonheung IS	원흥삼거리	Seonggye-ro	Jangsu County	Sanseo-myeon	
Bihaenggijae	비행기재		Jangsu County	Sanseo-myeon	Elevation 530m
Bihaenggijae			Jangsu County	Jangsu-eup	Elevation 530m
No name	(이름 없음)	Prefectural Route 742 (Palgong-ro)	Jangsu County	Jangsu-eup	
Gaejeong 2 IS	개정2사거리	National Route 19 (Jangsu-ro); Hannuri-ro	Jangsu County	Jangsu-eup	National Route 19 overlap
Bukdong Overpass	북동육교	Sijang-ro	Jangsu County	Jangsu-eup	National Route 19 overlap
Jangsu Overpass	장수육교	National Route 19 (Jangsu-ro); Jangcheol-ro	Jangsu County	Jangsu-eup	National Route 19 overlap
Wangdae Bridge	왕대교		Jangsu County	Jangsu-eup	
Wolgok IS	월곡삼거리	Seungma-ro	Jangsu County	Cheoncheon-myeon	
Namyang IS	남양삼거리	Prefectural Route 726 (Biryong-ro)	Jangsu County	Cheoncheon-myeon	Prefectural Route 726 overlap
Cheoncheon-myeon Office	천천면사무소		Jangsu County	Cheoncheon-myeon	Prefectural Route 726 overlap
Gogeum IS	고금삼거리	Songtan-ro	Jangsu County	Cheoncheon-myeon	Prefectural Route 726 overlap
Cheoncheon IS	천천삼거리	National Route 26; Prefectural Route 726 (Jinjang-ro); Cheoncheon-ro	Jangsu County	Cheoncheon-myeon	Prefectural Route 726 overlap National Route 26 overlap
Chonsong IS	춘송삼거리	Cheoncheon-ro	Jangsu County	Cheoncheon-myeon	National Route 26 overlap
Yonggwang IS	용광삼거리	National Route 26 (Jinjang-ro)	Jangsu County	Cheoncheon-myeon	National Route 26 overlap
Cheoncheon 1 Bridge Cheoncheon 2 Bridge	천천1교 천천2교		Jangsu County	Cheoncheon-myeon	
Oyeon IS	오연삼거리	Prefectural Route 726 (Cheoncheonbuk-ro)	Jangsu County	Cheoncheon-myeon	
Obong Bridge IS	오봉교삼거리	Prefectural Route 743 (Okjadong-gil)	Jangsu County	Cheoncheon-myeon	
No name	(이름 없음)	Donggye-ro	Jinan County	Donghyang-myeon	
Daeja IS	대야사거리	Prefectural Route 49 (Jinseong-ro); Cheonhyang-ro	Jinan County	Donghyang-myeon	Prefectural Route 49 overlap
Jasan IS	자산삼거리	Prefectural Route 49 (Jinseong-ro)	Jinan County	Donghyang-myeon	Prefectural Route 49 overlap
Singoe IS	신괴 교차로	National Route 30 (Jinmu-ro)	Jinan County	Ancheon-myeon	National Route 30 overlap
Noseong IS	노성 교차로	Jano-ro	Jinan County	Ancheon-myeon	National Route 30 overlap
Ancheon Bus Terminal	안천터미널		Jinan County	Ancheon-myeon	National Route 30 overlap
Bohan IS Ancheon-myeon Office	보한삼거리 안천면사무소	Bohan-gil	Jinan County	Ancheon-myeon	National Route 30 overlap
Baekhwa IS	백화삼거리	National Route 30 (Jinmu-ro)	Jinan County	Ancheon-myeon	National Route 30 overlap
Yongdam Dam	용담댐		Jinan County	Ancheon-myeon	
Sinyongdam Bridge	신용담교		Jinan County	Ancheon-myeon	
Songpung IS	송풍삼거리	Prefectural Route 795 (Jinyong-ro)	Jinan County	Yongdam-myeon	
Yongdam IS Yongdam Middle School	용담삼거리 용담중학교	Daesong-ro	Jinan County	Yongdam-myeon	
Soljae	솔재		Jinan County	Yongdam-myeon	Continuation into South Chungcheong Province

=== South Chungcheong Province ===
Name	Hangul name	Connection	Location		Note
Soljae	솔재		Geumsan County	Namil-myeon	North Jeolla Province - South Chungcheong Province border line
Sinjeong Bridge	신정교		Geumsan County	Namil-myeon	
Hongdo IS	홍도삼거리	Prefectural Route 635 (Daehong-ro)	Geumsan County	Namil-myeon	Prefectural Route 635 overlap
Geumsan Namil Middle School (Closed)	금산남일중학교(폐교)		Geumsan County	Namil-myeon	Prefectural Route 635 overlap
Yongsumok IS	용수목삼거리	Prefectural Route 55; Prefectural Route 635 (Sibipokpo-ro)	Geumsan County	Namil-myeon	Prefectural Route 55, 635 overlap
Sincheon IS	신천사거리	Bonghwang-ro; Sincheon-gil	Geumsan County	Namil-myeon	Prefectural Route 55 overlap
Seokdong IS	석동삼거리	Boseoksa-ro	Geumsan County	Nami-myeon	Prefectural Route 55 overlap
Geumsan General Sports Complex	금산군종합운동장	Hwangpung-ro	Geumsan County	Geumsan-eup	Prefectural Route 55 overlap
Haok IS	하옥사거리	Sampung-ro	Geumsan County	Geumsan-eup	Prefectural Route 55 overlap
Sanghaok IS	상하옥사거리	Bidan-ro	Geumsan County	Geumsan-eup	Prefectural Route 55 overlap
Geumsan Jungang Elementary School	금산중앙초등학교		Geumsan County	Geumsan-eup	Prefectural Route 55 overlap
Post Office IS	우체국사거리	Prefectural Route 68 (Insam-ro)	Geumsan County	Geumsan-eup	Prefectural Route 55 overlap
Myeon Office IS	읍사무소사거리	Biho-ro	Geumsan County	Geumsan-eup	
Hanil Traffic Corp. Geumsan Public Library Geumsan-gun Health Center Geumsan Darakwon	한일교통 금산인삼고을도서관 금산군보건소 금산다락원		Geumsan County	Geumsan-eup	
Yangjeon IS	양전삼거리	National Route 37 (Geumsan-ro) (Mugeum-ro)	Geumsan County	Geumseong-myeon	Terminus
