= List of highways numbered 38B =

The following highways are numbered 38B:

== United States ==
- MD 38B
- Nebraska Highway 38B (former)
- NY 38B

== See also ==
- List of highways numbered 38
