= National Route 29 (South Korea) =

Road in South Korea

National Route 29
- 국도 제29호선

Route information
- Length: 330.1 km (205.1 mi)
- Existed: 14 March 1981–present

Major junctions
- South end: Boseong, South Jeolla Province
- North end: Seosan, South Chungcheong Province

Location
- Country: South Korea

Highway system
- Highway systems of South Korea; Expressways; National; Local

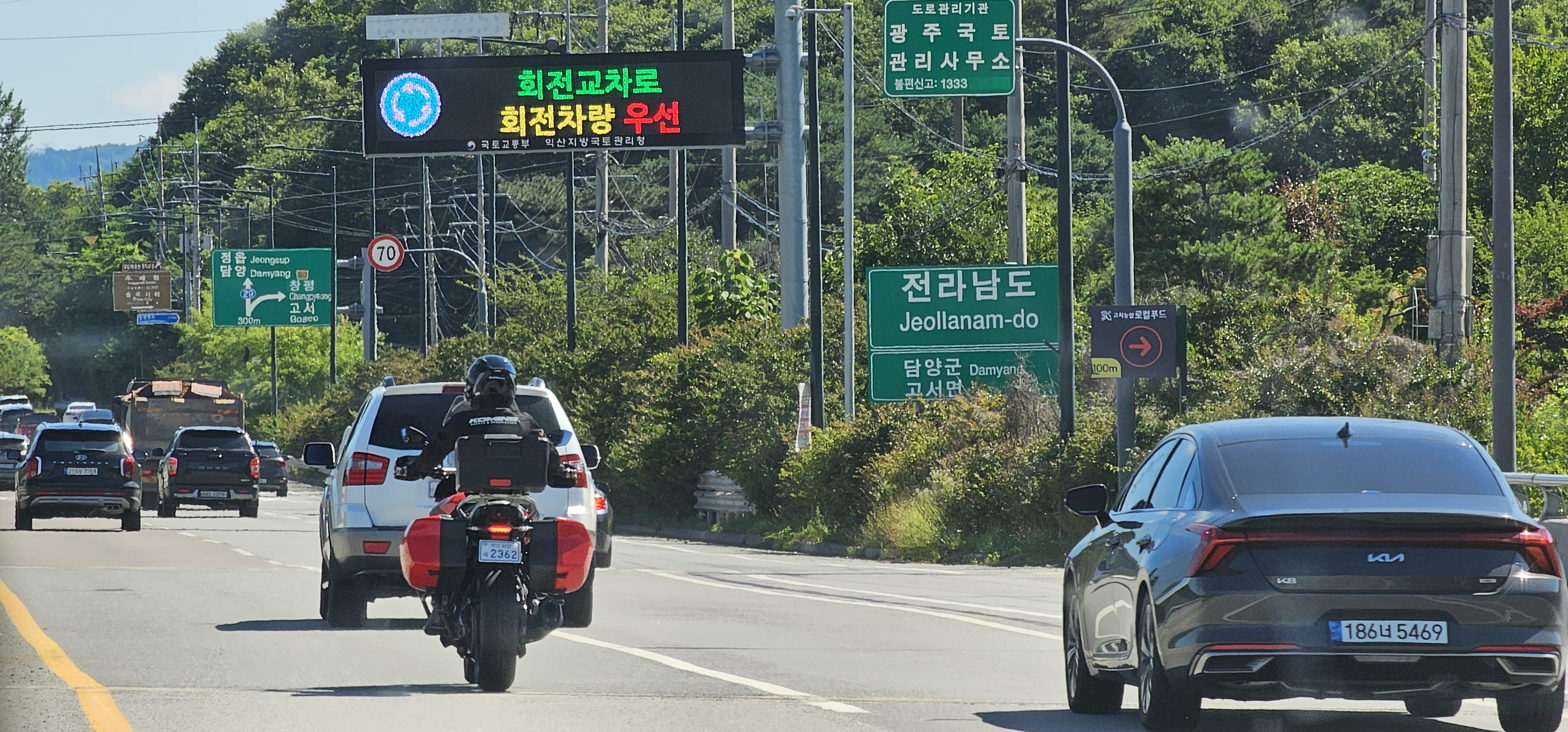
National Route 29 at the border between Jangseong County and Gwangju

National Route 29 is a national highway in South Korea that connects Boseong to Seosan. It was established on 14 March 1981.

== History ==
- March 14, 1981: New establishment of National Route 29 Jangdong–Daesan Line.
- April 16, 1981: Opening of the 153.922 km section from Okpo-ri, Hwayang-myeon, Seocheon County to Dokgot-ri, Daesan-myeon, Seosan County, upgraded to a national road.
- May 30, 1981: Road zone designation for a newly established 373 km section following the revision of Presidential Decree No. 10247 (General National Route Designation Decree).
- August 17, 1981: Opening of sections upgraded to national roads — 46.247 km from Daesan-ri, Jangheung-eup, Jangheung County to Hun-ri, Hwasun-eup, Hwasun County; 44.528 km from Gyeongchi-ri, Dong-myeon, Hwasun County to Cheonbyeon-ri, Damyang-eup, Damyang County; and 19.04 km from Gaeksa-ri, Damyang-eup, Damyang County to Yongchi-ri, Yong-myeon.
- May 22, 1986: Road zone designation for an 8.7 km section from Cheonbyeon-ri, Dongbok-myeon, Hwasun County to Suri, Buk-myeon, Hwasun County, due to route designation change.
- May 26, 1987: Abolition of existing national road sections in Eumnae-ri, Haemi-eup, Seosan County; Seoknim-ri to Eumnae-ri, Seosan-eup, Seosan County; Daesan-ri, Daesan-myeon, Seosan County; and Woe-ri, Gyuram-myeon, Buyeo County.
- September 11, 1987: Opening of a 520 m section in Seokdong-ri, Jangam-myeon, Buyeo County; abolition of the existing 700 m section.
- October 30, 1990: Starting point changed from Jangdong-myeon, Jangheung County, South Jeolla Province to Mireuk-myeon, Boseong County — route now called Boseong–Daesan Line.
- December 22, 1994: Opening of 21.5 km from Ip-po-ri, Yanghwa-myeon, Buyeo County to Dosam-ri, Maseo-myeon, Seocheon County; abolition of 200 m section in Ip-po-ri and 700 m in Dongsan-ri, Hansan-myeon; opening of 1.2 km in Seokdong-ri, Jangam-myeon, Buyeo County; abolition of existing 900 m section.
- February 18, 1995: Opening of 2.75 km section from Byeokcheon-ri to Hakdang-ri, Cheongyang-eup, Cheongyang County; abolition of existing 2.16 km section.
- July 1, 1996: Endpoint changed from Daesan-myeon, Seosan County to Daesan-eup, Seosan City — route now called Boseong–Seosan Line.
- July 3, 1996: Opening of 11.8 km from Yecheon-dong, Seosan City to Hwacheon-ri, Jigok-myeon; abolition of existing 5.82 km section.
- January 1997: Reopening of 900 m section of Sin-deokgyo Bridge (Buryang-myeon, Gimje City to Wolchon-dong).
- September 26, 1997: Opening of 21 km section from Hwacheon-ri, Jigok-myeon, Seosan City to Dokgot-ri, Daesan-eup; abolition of existing section.
- December 10, 1997: Opening of 1.48 km section from Hajangdaeri, Gwangsi-myeon, Yesan County to Jangdaeri, Bibong-myeon, Cheongyang County; abolition of existing 1.6 km section.
- December 30, 1998: Opening of 1.62 km from Ipseok-ri to Jangmun-ri, Gobu-myeon, Jeongeup City.
- January 8, 1999: Improvement and opening of 680 m section in Deokan District (Deok-an-ri to Ipseok-ri, Gobu-myeon); abolition of existing 730 m section.
- November 8, 1999: Opening of 11.22 km from Huam-ri to Suseok-dong, Haemi-myeon, Seosan City.
- December 10, 1999: Temporary 2.8 km opening of Gunpo Bridge (Bongsuk-ri, Baeksan-myeon, Buan County to Okjeong-ri, Buryang-myeon, Gimje City); abolition of existing 2.54 km section.
- January 13, 2001: Expansion and opening of 11.58 km Hongseong–Galsan Road (Okam-ri, Hongseong-eup to Ungok-ri, Galsan-myeon); abolition of 12.6 km existing section.
- September 27, 2001: Expansion and opening of 9.58 km from Jeongnam-ri, Neungju-myeon, Hwasun County to Isipgok-ri, Hwasun-eup; expansion and opening of 1.4 km from Gangseong-ri, Iyang-myeon to Yongdu-ri, Chunyang-myeon.
- September 28, 2001: Expansion and opening of 2.86 km from Mansa-ri to Gunsa-ri, Imcheon-myeon, Buyeo County.
- June 30, 2002: Expansion and opening of 3 km from Mosan-ri, Hancheon-myeon, Hwasun County to Jeongnam-ri, Neungju-myeon.
- November 14, 2005: Designation of 14.62 km from Seokgyo-ri, Baeksan-myeon, Gimje City to Jigyeong-ri, Daeya-myeon, Gunsan City as automobile-only road; designation of 1.9 km from Okseok-ri to Unhoe-ri, Gaejeong-myeon, Gunsan City as automobile-only road.
- December 22, 2005: Expansion and opening of 6.47 km from Unhoe-ri, Gaejeong-myeon to Seongdeok-ri, Seongsan-myeon, Gunsan City.
- April 30, 2007: Expansion and opening of section from Seoam-dong, Gimje City to Jigyeong-ri, Daeya-myeon, Gunsan City.
- December 31, 2008: New 6.5 km Hongseong South Bypass (Goam-ri, Hongseong-eup to Hwanggok-ri, Guhang-myeon); abolition of 4.2 km section passing central Hongseong-eup.
- January 23, 2009: Expansion and opening of 5.5 km from Deokrim-ri, Mireuk-myeon to Sincheon-ri, Nodong-myeon, Boseong County.
- May 22, 2009: Temporary opening of 4.6 km from Sincheon-ri, Nodong-myeon, Boseong County to Maejung-ri, Iyang-myeon, Hwasun County.
- July 28, 2009: Expansion and opening of 10.14 km from Deokrim-ri, Mireuk-myeon, Boseong County to Maejung-ri, Iyang-myeon, Hwasun County; abolition of 5.26 km from Dogae-ri, Mireuk-myeon to Sincheon-ri, Nodong-myeon.
- December 9, 2009: Expansion and opening of 4.6 km from Yongdu-ri, Chunyang-myeon to Mosan-ri, Hancheon-myeon, Hwasun County.
- December 31, 2009: Expansion and opening of 4.2 km Gobuk Bypass (Sinsong-ri to Sinsang-ri, Gobuk-myeon, Seosan City); abolition of 2.9 km existing section.
- January 11, 2010: Expansion and opening of 2.48 km Buan Baeksan Bypass (Pyeonggyo-ri to Yonggye-ri, Baeksan-myeon, Buan County).
- February 12, 2010: Expansion and opening of 8.04 km from Geumnung-ri, Iyang-myeon to Mosan-ri, Hancheon-myeon, Hwasun County.
- April 26, 2010: Temporary opening of 3.5 km from Maejung-ri to Songjeong-ri and Pum-pyeong-ri, Iyang-myeon, Hwasun County.
- November 11, 2010: Expansion and opening of 8.5 km from Maejung-ri to Pum-pyeong-ri, Iyang-myeon, Hwasun County.
- November 17, 2010: New 2.76 km section from Gajung-ri to Hongsan-ri, Eunsan-myeon, Buyeo County; abolition of 2.3 km existing section.
- December 1, 2012: Improvement and opening of 700 m Dosam District Dangerous Road (Dosam-ri, Maseo-myeon, Seocheon County); abolition of existing section.
- December 24, 2013: Expansion and opening of 9.216 km Jeongeup–Sintaein Road Section 1 (Yonggye-dong, Jeongeup to Huji-ri, Yeongwon-myeon).
- December 31, 2013: Expansion and opening of 1.85 km Samsan–Geumbung Road (Songsan-dong to Geumbung-dong, Jeongeup City).
- January 29, 2014: New 4.74 km from Nae-ri, Gyuram-myeon, Buyeo County to Gajung-ri, Eunsan-myeon; abolition of 5.47 km existing section.
- July 31, 2014: Expansion and opening of 5.13 km from Ungok-ri, Galsan-myeon, Hongseong County to Sinsong-ri, Gobuk-myeon, Seosan City and 2.88 km from Sinsang-ri, Gobuk-myeon to Josan-ri, Haemi-myeon; abolition of 4.8 km existing section.
- November 21, 2014: Expansion and opening of 5.7 km Hwasun–Gwangju Road including Sin-neoritjae Tunnel (Hwasun-eup, Hwasun County to Naenam-dong, Dong-gu, Gwangju); actual tunnel opened November 14.
- December 22, 2014: Expansion and opening of 2.1 km Munheung–Bochon Road (Jangdeung-dong, Buk-gu, Gwangju to Bochon-ri, Goseo-myeon, Damyang County).
- May 29, 2015: New 2.59 km Gyuram Bypass (Wonmun-ri, Jangam-myeon, Buyeo County to Nae-ri, Gyuram-myeon); abolition of 2.34 km existing section.
- December 31, 2015: New 7.96 km Sintaein–Gimje Road (Hwaho-ri, Sintaein-eup, Jeongeup to Yeonjeong-dong, Gimje City); abolition of existing 8.9 km section.
- December 30, 2016: Expansion and opening of 23.4 km Cheongyang–Hongseong Road (Gunryang-ri, Cheongyang-eup to Goam-ri, Hongseong-eup); abolition of 12.72 km existing section; new 1.86 km Seosan–Hwanggeumsan Road (Dokgot-ri, Daesan-eup, Seosan City); corrections issued June 13, 2017.
- December 26, 2018: Improvement and opening of 7.36 km Jeongeup Bujeon–Sunchang Ssangchi Road (Sinseong-ri, Ssangchi-myeon, Sunchang County to Bujeon-dong, Jeongeup); abolition of 1.95 km Ssangchi-myeon section and 5.52 km Bujeon-dong section.
- December 31, 2019: Expansion and opening of 6.44 km Sunchang Ssangchi Road (Geumpyeong-ri to Sinseong-ri, Ssangchi-myeon, Sunchang County); abolition of 760 m existing section.
- June 26, 2020: Expansion and opening of 7.52 km Jeongeup–Sintaein Road Section 2 (Huji-ri, Yeongwon-myeon to Pyeonggyo-ri, Baeksan-myeon, Buan County); abolition of 8.9 km existing section.
- May 31, 2021: New 300 m connecting intersection at Yeonjeong Intersection, Gimje City.
- August 2, 2024: Route change in Jeongeup, Jeollabuk-do.
- July 11, 2025: Route change in Damyang-eup, Damyang County, Jeollanam-do.

== Main stopovers ==
South Jeolla Province

- Boseong County - Hwasun County

Gwangju

- Dong District - Buk District

South Jeolla Province

- Damyang County

North Jeolla Province

- Sunchang County - Jeongeup - Buan County - Gimje - Jeongeup - Gimje - Gunsan

South Chungcheong Province

- Seocheon County - Buyeo County - Cheongyang County - Yesan County - Hongseong County - Seosan

== Major intersections ==
- (■): Motorway

IS: Intersection, IC: Interchange

=== South Jeolla Province ===
Name	Hangul name	Connection	Location		Note
Boseong IC (Chunjeong IS)	보성 나들목 (춘정 교차로)	Namhae Expressway; National Route 18 (Songjae-ro)	Boseong County	Miryeok-myeon	Terminus
Nokcha Tunnel	녹차터널		Boseong County	Miryeok-myeon	Right tunnel: Approximately 335m Left tunnel: Approximately 365m
Nokcha Tunnel			Boseong County	Nodong-myeon	Right tunnel: Approximately 335m Left tunnel: Approximately 365m
Hakdong Bridge (level crossing)	학동과선교		Boseong County	Nodong-myeon	
Singi IS	신기 교차로	Sincheon-gil	Boseong County	Nodong-myeon	
Yejae Tunnel	예재터널		Boseong County	Nodong-myeon	Right tunnel: Approximately 830m Left tunnel: Approximately 740m
Yejae Tunnel			Hwasun County	Iyang-myeon	Right tunnel: Approximately 830m Left tunnel: Approximately 740m
Bunja Bridge (North-bound) Lamdeok Bridge (South-bound)	분자과선교(상행) 람덕과선교(하행)		Hwasun County	Iyang-myeon	
Lamdeok Tunnel (North-bound)	람덕터널(상행)		Hwasun County	Iyang-myeon	Approximately 570m
Goehwa IS	괴화 교차로	Guryedong-gil; Goehwadong-gil	Hwasun County	Iyang-myeon	
Ssangbong IS	쌍봉 교차로	Prefectural Route 843 (Ssangsanui-ro)	Hwasun County	Iyang-myeon	
Songjeong IS	송정 교차로	Hakpo-ro	Hwasun County	Iyang-myeon	
Iyang Tunnel	이양터널		Hwasun County	Iyang-myeon	Approximately 445m
No name	(터널 이름 미상)		Hwasun County	Iyang-myeon	Approximately 110m
Iyang IS	이양 교차로	Prefectural Route 839 (Hakpo-ro)	Hwasun County	Iyang-myeon	
Geumneung IS	금능 교차로	Prefectural Route 58 (Gaegi-ro)	Hwasun County	Iyang-myeon	Prefectural Route 58 overlap
Ip Bridge	입교		Hwasun County	Iyang-myeon	Prefectural Route 58 overlap
Ip Bridge		Cheongpung-myeon	Hwasun County		Prefectural Route 58 overlap
Ipgyo IS	입교 교차로	Cheongpung-myeon	Hwasun County	Hakpo-ro	Prefectural Route 58 overlap
Yongdu Tunnel	용두터널		Hwasun County	Chunyang-myeon	Prefectural Route 58 overlap Approximately 280m
Seokjeong IS	석정 교차로	Prefectural Route 58 (Gaecheon-ro)	Hwasun County	Chunyang-myeon	Prefectural Route 58 overlap
Seokjeong IS	석정삼거리	Prefectural Route 818 (Chunyang-ro)	Hwasun County	Chunyang-myeon	
Dosan Bridge	도산교		Hwasun County	Chunyang-myeon	
Dosan Bridge			Hwasun County	Hancheon-myeon	
Mosan IS	모산 교차로	Prefectural Route 822 (Hakpo-ro)	Hwasun County	Hancheon-myeon	
Jiseokcheon 1 Bridge	지석천1교		Hwasun County	Hancheon-myeon	
Jiseokcheon 1 Bridge			Hwasun County	Neungju-myeon	
Neungju IS	능주 교차로	Hakpo-ro	Hwasun County	Neungju-myeon	
Jiseokcheon 2 Bridge	지석천2교		Hwasun County	Neungju-myeon	
Baekam IS	백암 교차로	Hakpo-ro	Hwasun County	Hwasun-eup	
Hwasun IC	화순 나들목	National Route 22 (Hwasun-ro)	Hwasun County	Hwasun-eup	National Route 22 overlap
Daeri 2 IS	대리2 교차로	Prefectural Route 55 (Oseong-ro); Chilchung-ro	Hwasun County	Hwasun-eup	National Route 22 overlap Prefectural Route 55 overlap
Gyori IC	교리 나들목	Seoyang-ro; Ssangchung-ro	Hwasun County	Hwasun-eup	National Route 22 overlap Prefectural Route 55 overlap
Sinneoritjae Tunnel	신너릿재터널		Hwasun County	Hwasun-eup	National Route 22 overlap Prefectural Route 55 overlap Approximately 765m
Sinneoritjae Tunnel			Gwangju City	Dong District	National Route 22 overlap Prefectural Route 55 overlap Approximately 765m
Naeji IS	내지 교차로	Nammun-ro	Gwangju City	Dong District	National Route 22 overlap Prefectural Route 55 overlap
Jiwon IS	지원 교차로	Gwangju Loop 2	Gwangju City	Dong District	National Route 22 overlap Prefectural Route 55 overlap
Jiwon 2-dong Community Center	지원2동주민센터		Gwangju City	Dong District	National Route 22 overlap Prefectural Route 55 overlap
Sotae station IS (Sotae Intercity Bus Terminal)	소태역 교차로 (소태역시외버스정류소)	Jiwon-ro; Nammun-ro 587beon-gil	Gwangju City	Dong District	National Route 22 overlap Prefectural Route 55 overlap
Jiwon 1-dong Community Center Donggu Culture Center	지원1동주민센터 동구문화센터		Gwangju City	Dong District	National Route 22 overlap Prefectural Route 55 overlap
Wonji Bridge IS	원지교 교차로	Jungsimcheon-ro; Cheonbyeonu-ro	Gwangju City	Dong District	National Route 22 overlap Prefectural Route 55 overlap
Hakdong IS (Hakdong–Jeungsimsa station)	학동삼거리 (학동·증심사입구역)	Uijae-ro; Nammun-ro 701beon-gil	Gwangju City	Dong District	National Route 22 overlap Prefectural Route 55 overlap
Hakdong Intercity Bus Terminal	학동시외버스정류소		Gwangju City	Dong District	National Route 22 overlap Prefectural Route 55 overlap
Namgwangju IS (Namgwangju station)	남광주 교차로 (남광주역)	National Route 22; Prefectural Route 60 (Daenam-daero); Jebong-ro	Gwangju City	Dong District	National Route 22 overlap Prefectural Route 55 overlap
Chosun University Entrance (Chosun University)	조선대입구 (조선대학교)	Seonam-ro	Gwangju City	Dong District	Prefectural Route 55, 60 overlap
Jisan IS	지산사거리	Dongmyeong-ro	Gwangju City	Dong District	Prefectural Route 55, 60 overlap
Sansu IS	산수오거리	Gyeongyang-ro; Mudeung-ro	Gwangju City	Dong District	Prefectural Route 55, 60 overlap
Duamjigu Entrance	두암지구입구	Galma-ro	Gwangju City	Dong District	Prefectural Route 55, 60 overlap
Punghyang IS	풍향삼거리	Gunwang-ro	Gwangju City	Buk District	Prefectural Route 55, 60 overlap
Gwangju National University of Education	광주교육대학교		Gwangju City	Buk District	Prefectural Route 55, 60 overlap
Seobang IS	서방사거리	Seoam-daero; Jungang-ro	Gwangju City	Buk District	Prefectural Route 55, 60 overlap
Seobang IS	서방삼거리	Seoyang-ro	Gwangju City	Buk District	Prefectural Route 55, 60 overlap
Dongkang College Gwangju Dongsin Middle School Gwangju Dongsin High School	동강대학교 광주동신중학교 광주동신고등학교		Gwangju City	Buk District	Prefectural Route 55, 60 overlap
Malbau IS	말바우사거리	Seobang-ro	Gwangju City	Buk District	Prefectural Route 55, 60 overlap
Munhwadong Intercity Bus Terminal	문화동시외버스정류장		Gwangju City	Buk District	Prefectural Route 55, 60 overlap
Usan Fire Station	우산119안전센터		Gwangju City	Buk District	Prefectural Route 55, 60 overlap
Mudeung Library IS	무등도서관사거리	Myeonang-ro	Gwangju City	Buk District	Prefectural Route 55, 60 overlap
Munheungjigu Entrance	문흥지구입구	Seoha-ro	Gwangju City	Buk District	Prefectural Route 55, 60 overlap
East Gwangju IC (Munhwa IS)	동광주 나들목 (문화사거리)	Honam Expressway; Gakhwa-daero	Gwangju City	Buk District	Prefectural Route 55, 60 overlap
Gwangju Gakhwa Market	광주농산물도매시장		Gwangju City	Buk District	Prefectural Route 55, 60 overlap
Gwangju Freight Terminal	광주화물터미널		Gwangju City	Buk District	Prefectural Route 55, 60 overlap
No name	(이름 없음)	Gunwang-ro; Omun-ro	Gwangju City	Buk District	Prefectural Route 55, 60 overlap
Doseonsa Entrance	도선사입구	Dodong-ro	Gwangju City	Buk District	Prefectural Route 55, 60 overlap
Seokgok-dong Community Center	석곡동주민센터		Gwangju City	Buk District	Prefectural Route 55, 60 overlap
No name	(이름 없음)	Prefectural Route 60 (Changpyeonghyeon-ro)	Damyang County	Goseo-myeon	Prefectural Route 55, 60 overlap
Bochon Bridge	보촌대교		Damyang County	Goseo-myeon	Prefectural Route 55 overlap
Wongang IS	원강 교차로	Prefectural Route 887 (Gasamunhang-ro)	Damyang County	Goseo-myeon	Prefectural Route 55,887 overlap
Yusan IS	유산 교차로	Songgangjeong-ro	Damyang County	Goseo-myeon	Prefectural Route 55,887 overlap
Yusan Bridge	유산교		Damyang County	Goseo-myeon	Prefectural Route 55,887 overlap
Yusan Bridge			Damyang County	Bongsan-myeon	Prefectural Route 55,887 overlap
Yeondong IS	연동 교차로	Prefectural Route 887 (Gamagol-ro)	Damyang County	Bongsan-myeon	Prefectural Route 55,887 overlap
Gigok IS	기곡 교차로	Changpyeong-ro	Damyang County	Bongsan-myeon	Prefectural Route 55 overlap
Jewol IS	제월 교차로	Yeongcheonseongdo-gil; Jewol-gil	Damyang County	Mujeong-myeon	Prefectural Route 55 overlap
Jewol Bridge	제월교		Damyang County	Mujeong-myeon	Prefectural Route 55 overlap
Jewol Bridge			Damyang County	Damyang-eup	Prefectural Route 55 overlap
Damyang IC (Damyanggonggo IS)	담양 나들목 (담양공고 교차로)	Gwangju–Daegu Expressway	Damyang County	Damyang-eup	Prefectural Route 55 overlap
Baekdong IS	백동사거리	National Route 24 (Jukhyangmunhwa-ro); National Route 13; National Route 15; Prefectural Route 15; Prefectural Route 887 (Mujeong-ro)	Damyang County	Damyang-eup	National Route 13, National Route 15, National Route 24 overlap Prefectural Route 55, 887 overlap
Damyang-eup IS	담양읍삼거리	National Route 24; Prefectural Route 55 (Jukyang-daero)	Damyang County	Damyang-eup	National Route 13, National Route 15, National Route 24 overlap Prefectural Route 55, 887 overlap
Dongun IS	동운삼거리	Jichim 6-gil	Damyang County	Damyang-eup	National Route 13, National Route 15 overlap Prefectural Route 15, 887 overlap
Damyang Bus Terminal	담양공용버스터미널		Damyang County	Damyang-eup	National Route 13, National Route 15 overlap Prefectural Route 15, 887 overlap
Jungpa IS	중파사거리	National Route 13; Prefectural Route 15; Prefectural Route 887 (Chuseong-ro)	Damyang County	Damyang-eup	National Route 13, National Route 15 overlap Prefectural Route 15, 887 overlap
Damyangdong Elementary School	담양동초등학교		Damyang County	Damyang-eup	
Sinnamjeong IS	신남정사거리	Jungnogwon-ro; Chuseong-ro	Damyang County	Damyang-eup	
Hyanggyo Bridge	향교교	Gaeksa 3-gil Yeonhwa-gil; Hyanggyo-gil	Damyang County	Damyang-eup	
Damyang Gymasium Jeonnam Provincial College Bamboo Forest	담양종합체육관 전남도립대학교 죽녹원		Damyang County	Damyang-eup	
Bamboo Forest IS	죽녹원후문 교차로	Jukhyangmunhwa-ro	Damyang County	Damyang-eup	
Damyang Eco HighTech Industrial Complex	담양에코하이테크농공단지	Taebong-ro	Damyang County	Damyang-eup	
Jangcheon Bridge	장천교		Damyang County	Damyang-eup	
Jangcheon Bridge			Damyang County	Yong-myeon	
Chuseong Bridge	추성교		Damyang County	Yong-myeon	
Chuseong IS	추성삼거리	Prefectural Route 897 (Churyeong-ro)	Damyang County	Yong-myeon	
Yong-myeon Office	용면사무소		Damyang County	Yong-myeon	
Dorim-ri	도림리	Geumseongsanseong-gil	Damyang County	Yong-myeon	
Chuwolsan Tunnel	추월산터널		Damyang County	Yong-myeon	Approximately 146m
Damyang Lake Tourism Complex Jakeunburaegijae Yongchi Bridge	담양호국민관광단지 작은부래기재 용치교		Damyang County	Yong-myeon	
Yongchi IS	용치삼거리	Prefectural Route 792 (Gamagol-ro)	Damyang County	Yong-myeon	Prefectural Route 792 overlap
Cheonchijae	천치재		Damyang County	Yong-myeon	Prefectural Route 792 overlap Elevation 347m Continuation into North Jeolla Province

=== North Jeolla Province ===
Name	Hangul name	Connection	Location		Note
Cheonchijae	천치재		Sunchang County	Bokheung-myeon	Prefectural Route 792 overlap Elevation 347m South Jeolla Province - North Jeolla Province border line
Dapdong IS	답동삼거리	Prefectural Route 792 (Gain-ro)	Sunchang County	Bokheung-myeon	Prefectural Route 792 overlap
Geumpyeong Bridge	금평교		Sunchang County	Ssangchi-myeon	
Ssanggalmae IS	쌍갈매삼거리	National Route 21 (Cheongjeong-ro)	Sunchang County	Ssangchi-myeon	National Route 21 overlap
Oksan IS	옥산삼거리	Guksabong-ro	Sunchang County	Ssangchi-myeon	National Route 21 overlap
Hunmongjae Entrance	훈몽재입구		Sunchang County	Ssangchi-myeon	National Route 21 overlap
Sinseong IS	신성교차로	Prefectural Route 49 (Baekbang-ro)	Sunchang County	Ssangchi-myeon	National Route 21 overlap Prefectural Route 49 overlap
Gaeunchi	개운치		Sunchang County	Ssangchi-myeon	National Route 21 overlap Prefectural Route 49 overlap
Gaeunchi			Jeongeup City	Naejangsang-dong	National Route 21 overlap Prefectural Route 49 overlap
Bujeonje IS	부전제삼거리	Prefectural Route 49 (Chilbosan-ro)	Jeongeup City	Naejangsang-dong	National Route 21 overlap Prefectural Route 49 overlap
Bujeon IS	부전사거리	Naejangsan-ro	Jeongeup City	Naejangsang-dong	National Route 21 overlap
Naejangsan Community Center	내장상동주민센터		Jeongeup City	Naejangsang-dong	National Route 21 overlap
Songsan IS	송산교차로	National Route 1 (Jeongeup-daero); National Route 21 (Naejangsan-ro)	Jeongeup City	Naejangsang-dong	National Route 1 overlap National Route 21 overlap
Naejang IS	내장사거리	Beotkkot-ro; Geumbong 1-gil	Jeongeup City	Naejangsang-dong	
Jeongeup Girls' High School	정읍여자고등학교		Jeongeup City	Naejangsang-dong	
No name	(이름 없음)	Prefectural Route 708 (Sangdongjungang-ro)	Jeongeup City	Naejangsang-dong	Prefectural Route 708 overlap
Jeongeup Office of Education	정읍교육지원청		Jeongeup City	Naejangsang-dong	Prefectural Route 708 overlap
Dong Elementary School IS (Jeongeupdongong Elementary School)	동초등교 교차로 (정읍동초등학교)	Prefectural Route 708 (Gwantong-ro)	Jeongeup City	Jangmyeong-dong	Prefectural Route 708 overlap
Jeongeup City Hall	정읍시청		Jeongeup City	Suseong-dong	
Jeongeup Jeil High School	정읍제일고등학교		Jeongeup City	Suseong-dong	
Gumidong IS	구미동사거리	Gumi-gil; Myeongnyun-gil	Jeongeup City	Suseong-dong	
Jeonhwaguk IS	전화국삼거리	Seobu-ro	Jeongeup City	Yeonji-dong	
Jandarimok IS	잔다리목사거리	Myeongdeok-ro; Myeongdeok 1-gil	Jeongeup City	Yeonji-dong	
Yeonji IS	연지사거리	Prefectural Route 701 (Seobusaneopdo-ro)	Jeongeup City	Yeonji-dong	National Route 22 overlap
Jeongju Underpass	정주지하차도		Jeongeup City	Yeonji-dong	National Route 22 overlap
Jeongeup Lotte Mart	롯데마트 정읍점	Beotkkot-ro	Jeongeup City	Nongso-dong	National Route 22 overlap Prefectural Route 705 overlap
Jeongil Girls' High School Nongso-dong Community Center	정일여자중학교 농소동주민센터		Jeongeup City	Nongso-dong	National Route 22 overlap
Jucheon IS	주천삼거리	National Route 22 (Soseong-ro)	Jeongeup City	Nongso-dong	National Route 22 overlap
Ipseok IS	입석삼거리	Ipgo-ro	Jeongeup City	Gobu-myeon	
No name	(이름 없음)	Prefectural Route 710 (Yeongju-ro)	Jeongeup City	Gobu-myeon	
Gobu IS	고부삼거리	Taego-ro; Gyodong 2-gil	Jeongeup City	Gobu-myeon	
Eunseon IS	은선사거리	Prefectural Route 736 (Gupa-ro)	Jeongeup City	Yeongwon-myeon	Prefectural Route 736 overlap
Baekjeong Doctor's Memorial Hall Yeongwon-myeon Office Yeongwon Elementary School	백정기의사기념관 영원면사무소 영원초등학교		Jeongeup City	Yeongwon-myeon	Prefectural Route 736 overlap
Uhak IS	운학삼거리	Prefectural Route 736 (Malmokjangteo-ro)	Jeongeup City	Yeongwon-myeon	Prefectural Route 736 overlap
No name	(이름 없음)	Baeksanseo-ro	Buan County	Baeksan-myeon	
Oegeo IS	외거삼거리	Prefectural Route 705 (Jiun-ro)	Buan County	Baeksan-myeon	Prefectural Route 705 overlap
Baeksan Elementary School Baeksan-myeon Office	백산초등학교 백산면사무소		Buan County	Baeksan-myeon	Prefectural Route 705 overlap
Pyeonggyo IS	평교사거리	Prefectural Route 705 (Bupyeong-ro); Imhyeon-ro	Buan County	Baeksan-myeon	Prefectural Route 705 overlap
Baeksan Junior High School Baeksan High School	백산중학교 백산고등학교		Buan County	Baeksan-myeon	
Baeksan IS	백산삼거리	Buryeong-ro	Buan County	Baeksan-myeon	
Beaksan IS	백산 교차로	National Route 30 (Hawon-ro)	Buan County	Baeksan-myeon	National Route 30 overlap
Gunpo Bridge	군포교		Buan County	Baeksan-myeon	National Route 30 overlap
Gunpo Bridge			Gimje City	Buryang-myeon	National Route 30 overlap
Okjeong IS	옥정삼거리	Prefectural Route 711 (Jukbaeng-ro)	Gimje City	Buryang-myeon	National Route 30 overlap
Hwaho IS	화호삼거리	National Route 30 (Seokji-ro)	Gimje City	Sintaein-eup	National Route 30 overlap
Insang High School	인상고등학교		Gimje City	Sintaein-eup	
Buryang-myeon Office	부량면사무소		Gimje City	Buryang-myeon	
Byeokgolje	벽골제		Gimje City	Buryang-myeon	
Je 1 Sindeok Bridge	제1신덕교		Gimje City	Buryang-myeon	
Je 1 Sindeok Bridge			Gimje City	Gyowol-dong	
No name	(이름 없음)	Ipseok-ro	Gimje City	Gyowol-dong	
No name	(이름 없음)	Dongseo-ro	Gimje City	Gyowol-dong	
Husin IS	후신 교차로	National Route 23 (Woljuk-ro)	Gimje City	Gyowol-dong	National Route 23 overlap
Seoam IS	서암사거리	National Route 23 (Byeokseong-ro)	Gimje City	Yochon-dong	National Route 23 overlap
Seoam 2 IS	서암2사거리	Mangyeong-ro	Gimje City	Yochon-dong	
Sinpyeongcheon Bridge	신평천교		Gimje City	Yochon-dong	
Sinpyeongcheon Bridge			Gimje City	Baeksan-myeon	
Huseok IS	후석 교차로	Seokgyo-ro	Gimje City	Baeksan-myeon	
Naejuk IS	내죽 교차로	Prefectural Route 702 (Neungje-ro)	Gimje City	Mangyeong-eup	
Singeum IS	신금 교차로	Prefectural Route 711 (Mangyeong-ro)	Gimje City	Cheongha-myeon	
Cheongha Bridge	청하대교		Gimje City	Cheongha-myeon	
Cheongha Bridge			Gunsan City	Daeya-myeon	
East Gunsan IC (Daeya IS)	동군산 나들목 (대야 교차로)	Seohaean Expressway; National Route 21 (Saemangeumbuk-ro)	Gunsan City	Daeya-myeon	National Route 21 overlap
Gaejeong IS	개정 교차로	National Route 21 (Saemangeumbuk-ro)	Gunsan City	Gaejeong-myeon	National Route 21 overlap
Choehojanggun IS	최호장군 교차로	National Route 26 (Beonyeong-ro)	Gunsan City	Gaejeong-myeon	
Songho IS	송호 교차로	Prefectural Route 709 (Songho-ro) (Adongnam-ro)	Gunsan City	Gaejeong-myeon	
Hodeok IS	호덕 교차로	National Route 21; National Route 27 (Guam-ro)	Gunsan City	Gaejeong-myeon	National Route 21 overlap Continuation into South Chungcheong Province
Gunsan Station IS	군산역 교차로		Gunsan City	Guam-dong	National Route 21 overlap Continuation into South Chungcheong Province
Haguduk IS	하구둑사거리	Prefectural Route 709 (Cheolsae-ro)	Gunsan City	Seongsan-myeon	National Route 21 overlap Continuation into South Chungcheong Province
Geumgang Riverwall	금강하구둑		Gunsan City	Seongsan-myeon	National Route 21 overlap Continuation into South Chungcheong Province

=== South Chungcheong Province ===
Name	Hangul name	Connection	Location		Note
Geumgang Riverwall	금강하구둑		Seocheon County	Maseo-myeon	National Route 21 overlap North Jeolla Province - South Chungcheong Province border line
Haguduk IS	하구둑사거리	National Route 21 (Geumgang-ro); Prefectural Route 68 (Jangsan-ro)	Seocheon County	Maseo-myeon	National Route 21 overlap Prefectural Route 68 overlap
Mangwol 1 Bridge	망월1교		Seocheon County	Maseo-myeon	Prefectural Route 68 overlap
Mangwol 1 Bridge			Seocheon County	Hwayang-myeon	Prefectural Route 68 overlap
Okpo IS	옥포사거리	Prefectural Route 68 (Okpo-gil); Hwasal-ro	Seocheon County	Hwayang-myeon	Prefectural Route 68 overlap
East Seocheon IC	동서천 나들목	Seocheon-Gongju Expressway	Seocheon County	Hwayang-myeon	
Gwangam IS	광암삼거리	Chungjeol-ro	Seocheon County	Gisan-myeon	
Hansanmosikwan	한산모시관		Seocheon County	Hansan-myeon	
Jihyeon IS	지현삼거리	Hansanmosi-gil	Seocheon County	Hansan-myeon	
Hansan Fire Station	한산119안전센터		Seocheon County	Hansan-myeon	
Yusan IS	유산사거리	Prefectural Route 613 (Hanma-ro) (Sinseong-ro)	Seocheon County	Hansan-myeon	
Yeosa Clinic	여사보건진료소		Seocheon County	Hansan-myeon	
Byeokryong Bridge	벽룡교	Samil-ro	Seocheon County	Hansan-myeon	
Byeokryong Bridge			Buyeo County	Yanghwa-myeon	
Byeokryong IS	벽룡사거리	Prefectural Route 723 (Yanghwabuk-ro) (Yanghwaseo-ro)	Buyeo County	Yanghwa-myeon	
Yanghwa Elementary School IS	양화초등학교 교차로	Prefectural Route 68 (Yanghwadong-ro)	Buyeo County	Yanghwa-myeon	Prefectural Route 68 overlap
Yanghwa Junior High School	양화중학교		Buyeo County	Yanghwa-myeon	Prefectural Route 68 overlap
Ippo IS	입포삼거리	Ippo-ro	Buyeo County	Yanghwa-myeon	Prefectural Route 68 overlap
Tapsan-ri IS	탑산리삼거리	Palchung-ro	Buyeo County	Imcheon-myeon	Prefectural Route 68 overlap
Mansa IS	만사삼거리	Prefectural Route 68 (Buheung-ro)	Buyeo County	Imcheon-myeon	Prefectural Route 68 overlap
Buyeo Electronic High School	부여전자고등학교		Buyeo County	Imcheon-myeon	
No name	(이름 없음)	Seongheung-ro	Buyeo County	Imcheon-myeon	
Imcheon IS	임천삼거리	Garim-ro	Buyeo County	Imcheon-myeon	
Gunsa IS	군사삼거리	Seongheung-ro	Buyeo County	Imcheon-myeon	
Jeomri IS	점리삼거리	Prefectural Route 611 (Wideok-ro) (Namseong-ro)	Buyeo County	Imcheon-myeon	
Hapgok IS	합곡삼거리	Majeong-ro	Buyeo County	Jangam-myeon	
Jangam IS	장암 교차로	Chungjeol-ro	Buyeo County	Jangam-myeon	
Naeri IS	내리 교차로	National Route 4 National Route 39; National Route 40 (Daebaekje-ro)	Buyeo County	Gyuam-myeon	National Route 39 overlap
Bansan IS	반산 교차로	Heungsu-ro	Buyeo County	Gyuam-myeon	National Route 39 overlap
Rabok IS	라복 교차로	Hoban-ro	Buyeo County	Gyuam-myeon	National Route 39 overlap
Ilgwangcheon Bridge	일광천교		Buyeo County	Gyuam-myeon	National Route 39 overlap
Buyeo IC (Buyeo IS)	부여 나들목 (부여 교차로)	Seocheon-Gongju Expressway	Buyeo County	Gyuam-myeon	National Route 39 overlap
Eunsan IS	은산 교차로	National Route 39; Prefectural Route 723 (Chungui-ro)	Buyeo County	Eunsan-myeon	National Route 39 overlap
Hongsan IS	홍산 교차로	Chungjeol-ro	Buyeo County	Eunsan-myeon	
Baekje CC	백제CC		Buyeo County	Eunsan-myeon	
Onjik IS	온직삼거리	Jicheongugong-ro	Cheongyang County	Namyang-myeon	
Geumjeong Bridge IS	금정교앞 교차로	Prefectural Route 610 (Guyong-gil)	Cheongyang County	Namyang-myeon	
Geumjeong IS	금정삼거리	Prefectural Route 606 (Mansu-ro)	Cheongyang County	Namyang-myeon	
Chungnam State University	충남도립청양대학		Cheongyang County	Cheongyang-eup	
Byeokcheon IS	벽천삼거리	Munhwayesul-ro	Cheongyang County	Cheongyang-eup	
Byeokcheon IS	벽천 교차로	National Route 36 (Daecheong-ro); Jungang-ro	Cheongyang County	Cheongyang-eup	
Hakdang IS	학당사거리	Jungang-ro; Cheongsu-gil	Cheongyang County	Cheongyang-eup	
Police Station IS (Cheongyang Police Station)	경찰서삼거리 (청양경찰서)		Cheongyang County	Cheongyang-eup	
Sinwol IS	신원삼거리	Prefectural Route 96 (Yongcheonsinwol-ro)	Cheongyang County	Bibong-myeon	Prefectural Route 96 overlap
(Jungmuk IS)	(중묵삼거리)	Prefectural Route 96 (Jungmugungong-ro)	Cheongyang County	Bibong-myeon	Prefectural Route 96 overlap
Ganam Elementary School	가남초등학교		Cheongyang County	Bibong-myeon	
Bibong-myeon Office	비봉면사무소		Cheongyang County	Bibong-myeon	
Bibong IS	비봉네거리	Rokpyeongyongdang-ro; Sangnok-gil	Cheongyang County	Bibong-myeon	
Cheontae IS	천태삼거리		Cheongyang County	Bibong-myeon	
Cheongseong Bridge	청성교		Yesan County	Gwangsi-myeon	
Nojeon IS	노전삼거리		Yesan County	Gwangsi-myeon	
Geumdang Fire Station	금당119지역대		Hongseong County	Hongdong-myeon	
Sagogae IS	사고개사거리	Gwanggeumnam-ro; Gwanggeumbuk-ro	Hongseong County	Hongdong-myeon	
Hongseong Fire Station	홍성소방서		Hongseong County	Hongseong-eup	
Goam IS	고암 교차로	National Route 21 (Nambusunhwan-ro); Chungjeol-ro	Hongseong County	Hongseong-eup	National Route 21 overlap
Yeongam IS	영암 교차로	Prefectural Route 609 (Hongjangbuk-ro)	Hongseong County	Hongseong-eup	National Route 21 overlap
Hakgye IS	학계 교차로	Daehak-gil	Hongseong County	Hongseong-eup	National Route 21 overlap
Maon IS (Maon Bridge)	마온 교차로 (마온교)	National Route 21 (Chungseo-ro)	Hongseong County	Hongseong-eup	National Route 21 overlap
Nambu Tunnel	남부터널		Hongseong County	Hongseong-eup	Approximately 485m
Okam IS	옥암 교차로	Naepo-ro	Hongseong County	Hongseong-eup	
Guhang IS	구항 교차로	Guseongnam-ro; Guseongbung-ro	Hongseong County	Guhang-myeon	
Dongsan IS	동산사거리	Naepo-ro852beon-gil; Naepo-ro853beon-gil	Hongseong County	Galsan-myeon	
Ssangcheon Bridge	쌍천교		Hongseong County	Galsan-myeon	
Hongseong IC (Galsan IS)	홍성 나들목 (갈산 교차로)	Seohaean Expressway; National Route 40 (Sudeoksa-ro)	Hongseong County	Galsan-myeon	National Route 40 overlap
Sangchon IS	상촌 교차로	National Route 40 (Cheonsuman-ro)	Hongseong County	Galsan-myeon	National Route 40 overlap
Bugi IS	부기 교차로	Galsan-ro; Naepo-ro1031beon-gil	Hongseong County	Galsan-myeon	
Dongseong Bus stop	동성정류소		Hongseong County	Galsan-myeon	
Sinsong IS	신송 교차로	Naepo-ro1721beon-gil	Hongseong County	Galsan-myeon	
Yangcheon Bridge	양천교		Seosan City	Gobuk-myeon	
Jeongja IS	정자 교차로	Gobuk 4-ro	Seosan City	Gobuk-myeon	
Gobuk IS	고북 교차로	Gobuk 3-ro	Seosan City	Gobuk-myeon	
Dogancheon Bridge	도간천교		Seosan City	Gobuk-myeon	
Gipo IS	기포 교차로	Gobuk 1-ro Gobuk 2-ro	Seosan City	Gobuk-myeon	
Nalsae IS	날새 교차로	Sinsangnalsae-gil	Seosan City	Gobuk-myeon	
Sinsang IS	신상 교차로	Sinsangnalsae-gil	Seosan City	Gobuk-myeon	
Hyuam IS	휴암 교차로	Sinseong-ro	Seosan City	Haemi-myeon	
Haemi IS	해미 교차로	National Route 45; Prefectural Route 70 (Jungang-ro); Prefectural Route 647 (Nammun 1-ro)	Seosan City	Haemi-myeon	Prefectural Route 70 overlap
Okgeo-ri IS	옥거리 교차로	Nammun 2-ro Deokjicheon-ro	Seosan City	Haemi-myeon	Prefectural Route 70 overlap
Dae Bridge	대교		Seosan City	Haemi-myeon	Prefectural Route 70 overlap
No name	(이름 없음)	Eumam-ro	Seosan City	Eumam-myeon	Prefectural Route 70 overlap
Sinjang IS	신장삼거리		Seosan City	Eumam-myeon	Prefectural Route 70 overlap
Sotam IS	소탐사거리	Nambusunhwan-ro; Sotam 1-ro	Seosan City	Suseok-dong	Prefectural Route 70 overlap
No name	(이름 없음)	Yangyeol-ro	Seosan City	Suseok-dong	Prefectural Route 70 overlap
Seokrimjung IS (Seosan Seorim Middle School)	석림중사거리 (서산석림중학교)	Dongseo 1-ro Dongseo 2-ro	Seosan City	Suseok-dong	Prefectural Route 70 overlap
Seokrim IS	석림사거리	National Route 32; Prefectural Route 649 (Seohae-ro); Jungang-ro	Seosan City	Suseok-dong	National Route 32 overlap Prefectural Route 70 overlap Prefectural Route 649 overlap
Seojung IS	서중사거리	Deokjicheon-ro	Seosan City	Suseok-dong	National Route 32 overlap Prefectural Route 70 overlap Prefectural Route 649 overlap
Seoknam IS	석남사거리	Nambusunhwan-ro; Hosugongwon 1-ro	Seosan City	Seoknam-dong	National Route 32 overlap Prefectural Route 70 overlap Prefectural Route 649 overlap
Yecheon IS	예천사거리	National Route 32; National Route 77; Prefectural Route 649 (Seohae-ro); Goun-ro	Seosan City	Seoknam-dong	National Route 32 overlap National Route 77 overlap Prefectural Route 70, 649 overlap
Galsan IS	갈산 교차로	Angyeon-ro	Seosan City	Buchun-dong	National Route 77 overlap Prefectural Route 70 overlap
Seosan Sports Complex	서산종합운동장	Angyeon-ro	Seosan City	Buchun-dong	National Route 77 overlap Prefectural Route 70 overlap
Ilram IS	일람 교차로	National Route 32	Seosan City	Seongyeon-myeon	Under construction National Route 77 overlap Prefectural Route 70 overlap
Ilram IS	일람사거리	Prefectural Route 634 (Hanwoldang-ro); Sayeondong-ro	Seosan City	Seongyeon-myeon	National Route 77 overlap Prefectural Route 70, 649 overlap
Ilram IS	일람삼거리	Ramdong-gil	Seosan City	Seongyeon-myeon	National Route 77 overlap Prefectural Route 70, 649 overlap
Osa IS	오사삼거리	Prefectural Route 634 (Seongyeon 3-ro)	Seosan City	Seongyeon-myeon	National Route 77 overlap Prefectural Route 70, 649 overlap
(Muan Bridge)	(무안교)	Mujangsaneop-ro	Seosan City	Seongyeon-myeon	National Route 77 overlap Prefectural Route 70 overlap
Jungwang IS	중왕 교차로	Wangsani-ro; Hwacheon 2-gil	Seosan City	Jigok-myeon	National Route 77 overlap Prefectural Route 70 overlap
Jigok IS	지곡 교차로	Prefectural Route 70 (Baekjesasin-ro)	Seosan City	Jigok-myeon	National Route 77 overlap Prefectural Route 70 overlap
Daesan Middle School	대산중학교		Seosan City	Daesan-eup	National Route 77 overlap
Daesan 1 IS	대산1교차로	Gujin-ro; Garorim-ro	Seosan City	Daesan-eup	National Route 77 overlap
Myeongji IS	명지사거리	National Route 38 (Myeongji 1-ro)	Seosan City	Daesan-eup	National Route 38, National Route 77 overlap
Hwagok IS	화곡 교차로	National Route 38; National Route 77 (Chungui-ro)	Seosan City	Daesan-eup	National Route 38, National Route 77 overlap
Daejuk IS	대죽 교차로	Daejuk 1-ro	Seosan City	Daesan-eup	
Daejuk-ri IS	대죽리진입로	Jugyeom-ro	Seosan City	Daesan-eup	
Dokgot 1 IS	독곶1 교차로	National Route 38 (Myeongji 1-ro)	Seosan City	Daesan-eup	
Dokgot 2 IS	독곶2 교차로	Dokgot 1-ro	Seosan City	Daesan-eup	
Dokgot-ri	독곶리		Seosan City	Daesan-eup	Terminus
