= List of highways numbered 39 =

The following highways are numbered 39. For a list of roads called N39, see List of N39 roads.

== International ==
- European route E39

== Australia ==
- Newell Highway
- Goulburn Valley Highway
  - Gore Highway
  - Leichhardt Highway

== Canada ==
- Alberta Highway 39
- British Columbia Highway 39
- Manitoba Highway 39
- Ontario Highway 39
- Saskatchewan Highway 39

== Costa Rica ==
- National Route 39

== Cuba ==
- Guanajay–Zayas Road (2–39)

== Czech Republic ==
- I/39 Highway; Czech: Silnice I/39

== France ==
- A39 autoroute

== Greece ==
- EO39 road, from Tripoli to Gytheio via Sparta

== India ==
- National Highway 39 (India)

== Iran ==
- Road 39

== Japan ==
- Japan National Route 39
- E39 Asahikawa-Mombetsu Expressway

== Korea, South ==
- National Route 39
- Gukjido 39

== Malaysia ==
- Setiawangsa–Pantai Expressway

== New Zealand ==
- New Zealand State Highway 39

== United Kingdom ==
- British A39 (Falmouth-Corston)

== United States ==
- Interstate 39
- Alabama State Route 39
  - County Route 39 (Lee County, Alabama)
- Arkansas Highway 39
- California State Route 39
- Colorado State Highway 39
- Connecticut Route 39
- Florida State Road 39
  - County Road 39 (Citrus County, Florida)
    - County Road 39A (Citrus County, Florida)
  - County Road 39 (Hillsborough County, Florida)
  - County Road 39 (Manatee County, Florida)
- Georgia State Route 39
- Idaho State Highway 39
- Illinois Route 39 (former)
- Indiana State Road 39
- Iowa Highway 39
- K-39 (Kansas highway)
- Kentucky Route 39
- Louisiana Highway 39
  - Louisiana State Route 39
- Maryland Route 39
  - Maryland Route 39A
- Massachusetts Route 39
- M-39 (Michigan highway)
- Minnesota State Highway 39
  - County Road 39 (Chisago County, Minnesota)
  - County Road 39 (Hennepin County, Minnesota)
- Mississippi Highway 39
- Missouri Route 39
- Montana Highway 39
- Nebraska Highway 39
- Nevada State Route 39 (former)
- New Jersey Route 39 (former)
  - County Route 39 (Bergen County, New Jersey)
  - County Route 39 (Monmouth County, New Jersey)
  - County Route 39 (Ocean County, New Jersey)
- New Mexico State Road 39
- New York State Route 39
  - County Route 39 (Dutchess County, New York)
  - County Route 39 (Erie County, New York)
  - County Route 39 (Genesee County, New York)
  - County Route 39 (Oswego County, New York)
  - County Route 39 (Rensselaer County, New York)
  - County Route 39 (Saratoga County, New York)
  - County Route 39 (Schoharie County, New York)
  - County Route 39 (St. Lawrence County, New York)
  - County Route 39 (Suffolk County, New York)
    - County Route 39A (Suffolk County, New York)
    - County Route 39B (Suffolk County, New York)
  - County Route 39 (Warren County, New York)
  - County Route 39 (Wyoming County, New York)
  - County Route 39 (Yates County, New York)
- North Carolina Highway 39
- North Dakota Highway 39 (former)
- Ohio State Route 39
- Oklahoma State Highway 39
- Oregon Route 39
- Pennsylvania Route 39
- South Carolina Highway 39
- Tennessee State Route 39
- Texas State Highway 39
  - Texas State Highway Loop 39 (former)
  - Texas State Highway Spur 39 (former)
  - Texas Park Road 39
  - Farm to Market Road 39
- Utah State Route 39
- Virginia State Route 39
  - Virginia State Route 39 (1923–1933) (former)
  - Virginia State Route 39 (1933-1940) (former)
- West Virginia Route 39
- Wisconsin Highway 39

Territories

- Puerto Rico Highway 39
- U.S. Virgin Islands Highway 39

== Uruguay ==
- Route 39 Domingo Burgueño

== See also ==
- A39 (disambiguation)#Roads

Preceded by 38	Lists of highways 39	Succeeded by 40
