= A39 =

A39 or A-39 may refer to:

== Roads ==
- A39 highway (Australia), a road in Victoria designated A39/B340
- A39 motorway (France), a road connecting Dijon with Dole and Bourg en Bresse
- A 39 motorway (Germany), a road connecting Salzgitter, Wolfsburg and Braunschweig
- A39 road (England)

== Other uses ==
- Tortoise heavy assault tank, a British experimental tank in World War 2
- Ak-Chin Regional Airport (FAA identifier A39)
- English Opening, Encyclopaedia of Chess Openings code
