= List of highways numbered 38A =

The following highways are numbered 38A:

== United States ==
- Maryland Route 38A
- Nebraska Highway 38A (former)
- Nevada State Route 38A (former)
- New York State Route 38A
  - County Route 38A (Otsego County, New York)
  - County Route 38A (St. Lawrence County, New York)
  - County Route 38A (Suffolk County, New York)
- South Dakota Highway 38A (former)
