= National Route 1 (South Korea) =

Road in South Korea

National Route 1
- 국도 제1호선
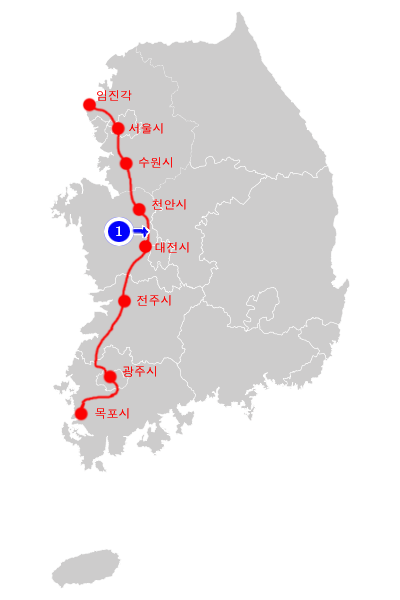

Route information
- Part of AH 1
- Length: 1,068.0 km (663.6 mi)
- Existed: 31 August 1971–present

Major junctions
- South end: Sinhang Intersection in Mokpo
- North end: North Korean border near Paju (unofficial); Sinuiju (official)

Location
- Country: South Korea

Highway system
- Highway systems of South Korea; Expressways; National; Local

National Route 1 (Korean: 국도 제1호선; RR: gukdo je1hoseon) is a national highway in South Korea. It connects Mokpo, South Jeolla Province with the city of Paju in Gyeonggi-do. Before the division of the Korean Peninsula, the highway ran until Sinuiju, North Pyongan Province, in present-day North Korea.

== History ==
Parts of National Route 1 were already being used as major roads during the Joseon dynasty. The portion from Seoul to Suwon aligns with Siheung Road and Gyeongsu Road which were established during the time of King Jeongjo, and the portion from Seoul to Euiju aligns with a major road used by envoys to and from China which was thus maintained by the government.

During the Japanese occupation, the Japanese government laid a new road that originates from Mokpo that passes through Seoul and ends at Sinuiju. The portion from Mokpo to Seoul was named National Route 3, and the portion from Seoul to Sinuiju was named National Route 2. The new road mostly used roads that were already established during the Joseon dynasty, but some parts were newly established as the Japanese government preferred a straighter route than one that passed through as many settlements along the way. The Japanese government then used the new route to invade Manchuria and expropriate rice to back to Japan.

After the Korean War, the route was separated at Imjingak. The route was expanded to four lanes from Daejeon to Sejong in 1999, and from Nonsan to Daejeon in 2004. The route was also connected to the Kaesong Industrial Region in 2000. In 2010, the route was straightened and no longer directly passed through Jeonju. As Sejong City developed, the city's portion of the route was expanded to 6-8 lanes.

On June 29, 2012, Mokpo Bridge was opened, and the route's starting point moved 4.27 km further south.

== Section ==
=== South Korea ===
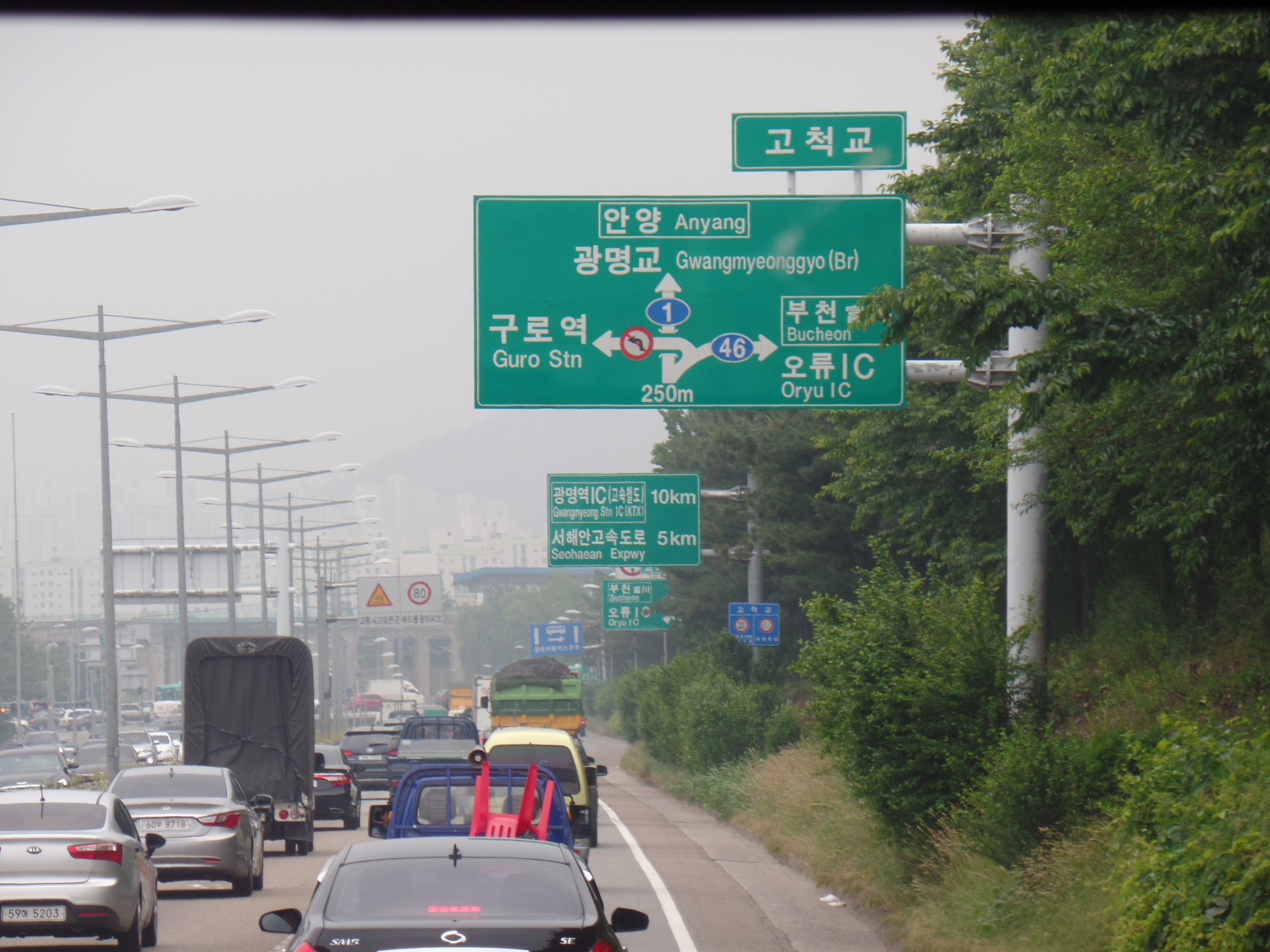
Gocheok Bridge Intersection in Seoul

South Jeolla Province

- Mokpo - Muan - Hampyeong - Naju

Gwangju

- Nam District - Seo District - Buk District - Gwangsan District

South Jeolla Province

- Jangseong

North Jeolla Province

- Jeongeup - Gimje - Jeonju (Wansan-gu) - Wanju County - Jeonju (Wansan-gu) - Wanju County - Iksan

South Chungcheong Province

- Nonsan - Gyeryong

Daejeon

- Yuseong District

South Chungcheong Province

- Gongju

Sejong City

North Chungcheong Province

- Cheongju (Heungdeok-gu)

Sejong City

South Chungcheong Province

- Cheonan (Dongnam-gu)

Sejong City

South Chungcheong Province

- Cheonan (Dongnam-gu - Seobuk-gu)

Gyeonggi Province

- Pyeongtaek - Osan - Hwaseong - Suwon (Jangan-gu - Paldal-gu) - Uiwang - Anyang (Dongan-gu - Manan-gu)

Seoul

- Geumcheon District - Yeongdeungpo District - Mapo District - Eunpyeong District

Gyeonggi Province

- Goyang (Deogyang-gu) - Paju

=== North Korea ===
North Hwanghae Province

- Changpung - Kaesong - Kumchon - Pyongsan - Sohung - Pongsan - Hwangju - Chunghwa

South Pyongan Province

- Taedong

Pyongyang

South Pyongan Province

- Taedong - Pyongwon - Anju

North Pyongan Province

- Pakchon - Chongju - Sonchon - Cholsan - Ryongchon - Sinuiju

== Major intersections ==
- (■): Motorway

IS: Intersection, IC: Interchange

=== South Jeolla Province (South of Gwangju) ===
Name (Note: Intersection and interchange are also included, as well as buildings and facilities in the surrounding area)	Hangul name	Connection	Location		Note
Goha-do (Sinhang IS)	고하도 (신항 교차로)	Sinhang-ro 294beon-gil	Mokpo City	Yudal-dong	Terminus
Mokpo Bridge	목포대교		Mokpo City	Yudal-dong	
Bukhang IS	북항 교차로	Bukhang-ro	Mokpo City	Jukgyo-dong	
Bukhang-dong Community Center	북항동주민센터		Mokpo City	Bukhang-dong	
Mokpo Social Welfare Center Jeonnam Central Hospital	목포종합사회복지관 전남중앙병원		Mokpo City	Wonsan-dong	
Yeonsan-dong Community Center	연산동주민센터	Yeonsan-ro	Mokpo City	Yeonsan-dong	
Yeonsan-dong IS	연산동 교차로	Sanjeong-ro	Mokpo City	Yeonsan-dong	
Mokpo Meteorological Administration	목포기상대		Mokpo City	Yeonsan-dong	
Sapjin Industrial Complex (Sapjin Overpass)	삽진산단입구 (삽진고가교)	Daeyang-ro	Mokpo City	Yeonsan-dong	
Sanjeong IS	산정 교차로	National Route 2 (Aphae-ro); Yongdan-ro	Mokpo City	Samhyang-dong	National Route 2 overlap
Naehwa IS	내화 교차로	Naehwamaeul-gil 135beon-gil	Mokpo City	Samhyang-dong	National Route 2 overlap
Mokpo IC	목포 나들목	National Route 2 (Goha-daero); Yeongsan-ro	Mokpo City	Samhyang-dong	National Route 2 overlap Former Seohaean Expressway terminus
Mokpo IC		National Route 2 (Goha-daero); Yeongsan-ro	Muan County	Samhyang-eup	National Route 2 overlap Former Seohaean Expressway terminus
Namyang Reservoir	남양저수지	Prefectural Route 825 (Wangsan-ro) (Samhyangjungang-ro)	Muan County	Samhyang-eup	
Samhyang Agro-Industrial Complex	삼향농공단지		Muan County	Samhyang-eup	
Cheonggye Bridge	청계교		Muan County	Samhyang-eup	
Cheonggye Bridge			Muan County	Cheonggye-myeon	
Guam IS	구암삼거리	Prefectural Route 815 (Munhwa-ro)	Muan County	Cheonggye-myeon	Prefectural Route 815 overlap
Cheonggyegogae	청계고개		Muan County	Cheonggye-myeon	Prefectural Route 815 overlap
Mokpodae IS (Mokpo National University Cyber Campus)	목포대사거리 (목포대학교 도림캠퍼스)	Haean-ro	Muan County	Cheonggye-myeon	Prefectural Route 815 overlap
Cheonggye Intercity Bus Stop Cheonggye-myeon Office	청계시외버스정류장 청계면사무소		Muan County	Cheonggye-myeon	Prefectural Route 815 overlap
Cheonggye IS	청계삼거리	Prefectural Route 815 (Cheongun-ro)	Muan County	Cheonggye-myeon	Prefectural Route 815 overlap
Cheonggye Elementary School	청계초등학교		Muan County	Cheonggye-myeon	
Sinheung IS	신흥삼거리	Cheonggyegongdan-gil	Muan County	Cheonggye-myeon	
Taebong IS	태봉 교차로	Muan-ro	Muan County	Cheonggye-myeon	
Sama IS	사마 교차로	Dodae-ro	Muan County	Cheonggye-myeon	
Sama Bridge	사마교		Muan County	Cheonggye-myeon	
Sama Bridge			Muan County	Muan-eup	
Pyeongyong IS	평용 교차로	Changpo-ro	Muan County	Muan-eup	
Gyochon IS	교촌 교차로	Prefectural Route 60 (Gonghang-ro)	Muan County	Muan-eup	Prefectural Route 60 overlap
Gojeol Bridge Songsacheon Bridge	고절교 송사천교		Muan County	Muan-eup	Prefectural Route 60 overlap
No name	(이름 없음)	Prefectural Route 811 (Muan-ro)	Muan County	Muan-eup	Prefectural Route 60, 811 overlap
Muan IC	무안 나들목	Seohaean Expressway	Muan County	Muan-eup	Prefectural Route 60, 811 overlap
Eomda Middle School (Closed)	엄다중학교 (폐교)	Prefectural Route 811 (Sinsong-gil)	Hampyeong County	Eomda-myeon	Prefectural Route 60, 811 overlap
Haejeong IS	해정사거리	Gonjae-ro	Hampyeong County	Eomda-myeon	Prefectural Route 60 overlap
Sohak Bridge Hakya Bridge	소학교 학야교		Hampyeong County	Eomda-myeon	Prefectural Route 60 overlap
Hakgyo IS (Hakgyo Overpass)	학교사거리 (학교고가교)	National Route 23; Prefectural Route 825 (Hamyeong-ro)	Hampyeong County	Hakgyo-myeon	Prefectural Route 60, 825 overlap
Hampyeong station Hakdari Jungang Elementary School (Closed)	함평역 학다리중앙초등학교 (폐교)		Hampyeong County	Hakgyo-myeon	Prefectural Route 60, 825 overlap
Hakda-ri IS	학다리삼거리	Hakdong-ro	Hampyeong County	Hakgyo-myeon	Prefectural Route 60, 825 overlap
Argo-industrial Complex IS	농공단지삼거리	Hakgyogongdan-gil	Hampyeong County	Hakgyo-myeon	Prefectural Route 60, 825 overlap
Gomak Bridge	고막교		Hampyeong County	Hakgyo-myeon	Prefectural Route 60, 825 overlap
Gomak Bridge			Naju City	Dasi-myeon	Prefectural Route 60, 825 overlap
Gomagwon Station	구고막원역앞	Prefectural Route 825 (Cheam-ro)	Naju City	Munpyeong-myeon	Prefectural Route 60, 825 overlap
Naju WEE Center (Former Munpyeongnam Elementary School)	나주WEE센터 (구 문평남초등학교)		Naju City	Munpyeong-myeon	Prefectural Route 60 overlap
Dasi Bridge	다시교		Naju City	Dasi-myeon	Prefectural Route 60 overlap
Dasi-myeon	다시면소재지	Prefectural Route 801 (Woram-ro) (Daeyong-gil)	Naju City	Dasi-myeon	Prefectural Route 60 overlap
Dasi Public Bus Terminal	다시공용버스터미널		Naju City	Dasi-myeon	Prefectural Route 60 overlap
Dasi IS	다시 교차로	Yeongsan-ro	Naju City	Dasi-myeon	Prefectural Route 60 overlap
Bokam IS	복암 교차로	Baekho-ro	Naju City	Dasi-myeon	Prefectural Route 60 overlap
Yeongsan Bridge	영산교		Naju City	Dasi-myeon	Prefectural Route 60 overlap
Yeongsan Bridge			Naju City	Ichang-dong	Prefectural Route 60 overlap
Oryang Bridge	오량교		Naju City	Ichang-dong	Prefectural Route 60 overlap
Dongsu IS	동수 교차로	National Route 23; Prefectural Route 49 (Najuseobu-ro)	Naju City	Ichang-dong	Prefectural Route 49, 60 overlap
Jangsan 1 Bridge	장산1교		Naju City	Wanggok-myeon	Prefectural Route 49, 60 overlap
Wanggok IS	왕곡 교차로	National Route 13 (Yehyang-ro)	Naju City	Wanggok-myeon	Prefectural Route 49, 60 overlap
Gusan Bridge	구산교		Naju City	Wanggok-myeon	Prefectural Route 49, 60 overlap
Manbongcheon Bridge	만봉천교		Naju City	Wanggok-myeon	Prefectural Route 49, 60 overlap
Manbongcheon Bridge			Naju City	Ichang-dong	Prefectural Route 49, 60 overlap
Budeok IS	부덕 교차로	National Route 23 (Yeongna-ro)	Naju City	Ichang-dong	Prefectural Route 49, 60 overlap
Budeok IS		National Route 23 (Yeongna-ro)	Naju City	Yeongsan-dong	Prefectural Route 49, 60 overlap
Budeok Bridge Bonghwangcheon Bridge	부덕교 봉황천교		Naju City	Yeongsan-dong	Prefectural Route 49, 60 overlap
Bangchuk Bridge	방축교	Prefectural Route 58	Naju City	Geumcheon-myeon	Prefectural Route 49, 60 overlap
Wolsan Bridge Dongak Bridge	월산교 동악교		Naju City	Geumcheon-myeon	Prefectural Route 49, 60 overlap
Sincheon IS	신천 교차로	Geumyeong-ro; Munhwa-ro	Naju City	Geumcheon-myeon	Prefectural Route 49, 60 overlap
Seokjeon IS (Underpass)	석전 교차로 (지하차도)	Bitgaram-ro	Naju City	Geumcheon-myeon	Prefectural Route 49, 60 overlap
Geumcheon IS	금천 교차로	Prefectural Route 49 (Bitgaramjangseong-ro); Yeongsan-ro	Naju City	Geumcheon-myeon	Prefectural Route 49, 60 overlap
Naegi IS	내기사거리	Naegi 1-gil	Naju City	Sanpo-myeon	Prefectural Route 60 overlap
Sanpo-myeon IS (Overpass)	산포면사거리 (고가교)	Sanpo-ro	Naju City	Sanpo-myeon	Prefectural Route 60 overlap
No name	(이름 없음)	Sannam-ro	Naju City	Sanpo-myeon	Prefectural Route 60 overlap
Dongjeong 3 Bridge	동정3교		Naju City	Sanpo-myeon	Prefectural Route 60 overlap
Dongjeong 3 Bridge			Naju City	Nampyeong-eup	Prefectural Route 60 overlap
Nampyeong Bridge	남평대교		Naju City	Nampyeong-eup	Prefectural Route 60 overlap
Gwangi IS	광이 교차로	Hoejae-ro	Naju City	Nampyeong-eup	Prefectural Route 60 overlap Continuation into Gwangju

- Motorway
  - Mokpo Yudal-dong Mokpo Bridge (Goha-daero)
  - Mokpo Yeonsan-dong Sapjin Industrial IS ~ Mokpo IC (Goha-daero)

=== Gwangju ===
Name	Hangul name	Connection	Location		Note
(Chilseok IS)	(칠석 교차로)	Chilseok 3-gil	Gwangju	Nam District	Prefectural Route 60 overlap South Jeolla Province - Gwangju border line
Geondeok Tunnel	건덕터널		Gwangju	Nam District	Prefectural Route 60 overlap Right tunnel: Approximately 280m Left tunnel: Approximately 260m
(Jisan IS)	(지산 교차로)	Sannam-ro	Gwangju	Nam District	Prefectural Route 60 overlap
Pochungsa Entrance IS	포충사입구 교차로	Pochung-ro	Gwangju	Nam District	Prefectural Route 60 overlap
Daechon Overpass	대촌육교		Gwangju	Nam District	Prefectural Route 60 overlap
Haengam IS	행암 교차로	Hyou-ro; Imam-gil	Gwangju	Nam District	Prefectural Route 60 overlap
Hyocheon station Inseong High School	효천역 인성고등학교		Gwangju	Nam District	Prefectural Route 60 overlap
Songam Overpass IS	송암고가 교차로	Songam-ro	Gwangju	Nam District	Prefectural Route 60 overlap
Hyodeok IS (Hyodeok Underpass)	효덕 교차로 (효덕지하차도)	Gwangju Loop 2 Hyodeok-ro	Gwangju	Nam District	Prefectural Route 60 overlap
Gwangju Nambu Intercity Bus Stop	광주남부시외버스정류소		Gwangju	Nam District	Prefectural Route 60 overlap
No name	(이름 없음)	Hoeseo-ro	Gwangju	Nam District	Prefectural Route 60 overlap
Baekun IS	백운 교차로	National Route 22; Prefectural Route 60 (Daenam-daero)	Gwangju	Nam District	National Route 22 overlap Prefectural Route 60 overlap
Juwol IS	주월 교차로	Hoejae-ro	Gwangju	Nam District	National Route 22 overlap
(Wolsan IS)	(월산 교차로)	Geumhwa-ro	Gwangju	Nam District	National Route 22 overlap
Association of Health Promotion IS	건강관리협회 교차로	Hwajeong-ro	Gwangju	Seo District	National Route 22 overlap
Nongseong station (Nongseong IS)	농성역 (농성 교차로)	National Route 22 (Sangmu-daero)	Gwangju	Seo District	National Route 22 overlap
Teachers' Credit Union	교직원공제회앞	Naebang-ro	Gwangju	Seo District	
E-mart Gwangju store	이마트 광주점		Gwangju	Seo District	
Gwangcheon IS (Shinsegae Department Store Gwangju)	광천사거리 (신세계백화점 광주신세계점)	Mujin-daero	Gwangju	Seo District	
2nd Gwangcheon Bridge	제2광천교		Gwangju	Seo District	
2nd Gwangcheon Bridge			Gwangju	Buk District	
Dongun Overpass IS (South side)	동운고가 교차로 (남단)	Hanam-daero	Gwangju	Buk District	
Dongun Overpass	동운고가		Gwangju	Buk District	
Dongun Overpass IS (North side)	동운고가 교차로 (북단)	Seoam-daero; Biennale-ro; Daeja-ro	Gwangju	Buk District	
Gwangju Culture & Arts Center Unam-dong Intercity Bus Stop	광주문화예술회관 운암동시외버스정류장		Gwangju	Buk District	
Unam IS	운암사거리	Haseo-ro; Hwaun-ro	Gwangju	Buk District	West Gwangju IC (Honam Expressway) Indirectly connected
Unam Library	구립운암도서관		Gwangju	Buk District	
Arts High School IS	예술고 교차로	Seogang-ro	Gwangju	Buk District	
Gwangju Good Morning Hospital Unam Hankook Hospital Dongnim Gymnasium	광주굿모닝병원 운암한국병원 동림다목적체육관		Gwangju	Buk District	
Dongnimjigu IS	동림지구앞 교차로	Dongnimyongsan-ro; Bungmun-daero 201beon-gil	Gwangju	Buk District	
Gwangju Community Rehabilitation Center	광주광역시 장애인종합복지관		Gwangju	Buk District	
(Dongnim IS)	(동림 교차로)	Bitgoeul-daero	Gwangju	Buk District	
Sandong Bridge	산동교		Gwangju	Buk District	
Sandong Bridge			Gwangju	Gwangsan District	
Sinchang IS	신창 교차로	Jangsin-ro	Gwangju	Gwangsan District	
Sinchang-dong IS	신창동삼거리		Gwangju	Gwangsan District	
Cheomdan IS	첨단 교차로	Sinchang-ro	Gwangju	Gwangsan District	
Sanwol IC	산월 나들목	Honam Expressway; Gwangju Loop 2 Cheomdanwolbong-ro	Gwangju	Gwangsan District	Inaccessible to Honam Expressway
Sangwan IS	상완 교차로	Sangwan-gil	Gwangju	Gwangsan District	
Suwan Bridge	수완교	Imbangul-daero	Gwangju	Gwangsan District	
Bia Overpass	비아육교		Gwangju	Gwangsan District	
Gwangsan IS Gwangsan IC	광산 교차로 광산 나들목	Honam Expressway; National Route 13 (Saam-ro) (Cheomdangwagi-ro)	Gwangju	Gwangsan District	
Docheon IS	도천 교차로	Bia-ro	Gwangju	Gwangsan District	
Bia Bus Stop	비아정류소		Gwangju	Gwangsan District	
Asan IS	아산 교차로	Biajungang-ro	Gwangju	Gwangsan District	Continuation into South Jeolla Province

=== South Jeolla Province (North of Gwangju) ===
Name	Hangul name	Connection	Location		Note
Bukgwangsan IS	북광산 교차로	Hanamjingoksandan-ro	Jangseong County	Nam-myeon	Gwangju - South Jeolla Province border line
Songgwang Bridge Wolgok Bridge Deokchon Bridge Bunhyang Overpass	송광교 월곡교 덕촌교 분향육교		Jangseong County	Nam-myeon	
Deokchon IS	덕촌 교차로	Motjae-ro; Jinnam 1-ro	Jangseong County	Nam-myeon	
Simok IS	시목 교차로	Motjae-ro; Simok 1-gil	Jangseong County	Jinwon-myeon	
Maheung IS	마흥 교차로	Motjae-ro; Maheung-gil; Yulgok-gil	Jangseong County	Jinwon-myeon	
Motjae Tunnel	못재터널		Jangseong County	Jinwon-myeon	Right tunnel: Approximately 1,210m Left tunnel: Approximately 1,229m
Motjae Tunnel			Jangseong County	Jangseong-eup	Right tunnel: Approximately 1,210m Left tunnel: Approximately 1,229m
Jangseong IC (Gajak IS)	장성 나들목 (가작 교차로)	Honam Expressway; National Route 24 (Nosa-ro)	Jangseong County	Jangseong-eup	National Route 24 overlap
Jangseong IS	장성 교차로	National Route 24 (Hamjang-ro)	Jangseong County	Jangseong-eup	National Route 24 overlap
Wolsan IS	월산 교차로	Danpung-ro; Yeongcheonwolsan-gil	Jangseong County	Jangseong-eup	
Seongsan IS	성산 교차로	Danpung-ro	Jangseong County	Jangseong-eup	
Yaeun IS	야은 교차로	Prefectural Route 898 (Danpung-ro)	Jangseong County	Jangseong-eup	Prefectural Route 898 overlap
Deokjin IS	덕진 교차로	Danpung-ro	Jangseong County	Jangseong-eup	Prefectural Route 898 overlap
Gusan IS	구산 교차로	Prefectural Route 898 (Danpung-ro)	Jangseong County	Jangseong-eup	Prefectural Route 898 overlap
Gusan Underpass	구산지하차도		Jangseong County	Jangseong-eup	
Gusan Underpass			Jangseong County	Bukha-myeon	
Daeak IS	대악 교차로	Daebang-gil	Jangseong County	Bukha-myeon	
Danjeon IS	단전 교차로	Danpung-ro; Sollyong-gil	Jangseong County	Bukha-myeon	
Yongdu Tunnel	용두터널		Jangseong County	Bukha-myeon	Right tunnel: Approximately 834m Left tunnel: Approximately 848m
Yaksu IS	약수 교차로	Prefectural Route 15; Prefectural Route 49 (Danpung-ro); Baekyang-ro	Jangseong County	Bukha-myeon	Prefectural Route 15, 49 overlap
Yaksu IS	약수삼거리	Baekyang-ro	Jangseong County	Bukha-myeon	Prefectural Route 15, 49 overlap
Wondong IS	원동 교차로	Prefectural Route 15; Prefectural Route 49 (Baekyang-ro)	Jangseong County	Bukha-myeon	Prefectural Route 15, 49 overlap
Ssangung Tunnel	쌍웅터널		Jangseong County	Bukha-myeon	Approximately 555m
Sinseong IS	신성 교차로	Baekyang-ro	Jangseong County	Bukha-myeon	
Gomjae Tunnel	곰재터널		Jangseong County	Bukha-myeon	Approximately 390m
Gomjae Tunnel			Jangseong County	Buki-myeon	Approximately 390m
Owol Tunnel	오월터널		Jangseong County	Buki-myeon	Approximately 245m
Bokryong IS	복룡 교차로	Bangjang-ro	Jangseong County	Buki-myeon	
Josan IS	조산 교차로	Josan-gil	Jangseong County	Buki-myeon	
2nd Honam Tunnel	호남제2터널		Jangseong County	Buki-myeon	Right tunnel: Approximately 1,760m Left tunnel: Approximately 1,720m Continuation into North Jeolla Province

=== North Jeolla Province ===
Name	Hangul name	Connection	Location		Note
2nd Honam Tunnel	호남제2터널		Jeongeup City	Ibam-myeon	Right tunnel: Approximately 1,760m Left tunnel: Approximately 1,720m South Jeolla Province - North Jeolla Province border line
Ibam Tunnel	입암터널		Jeongeup City	Ibam-myeon	Right tunnel: Approximately 308m Left tunnel: Approximately 301m
Ibam IS (Naejangsan IC IS) (Naejangsan IC)	입암 교차로 (내장산IC사거리) (내장산 나들목)	Honam Expressway; Prefectural Route 708 (Ibam-ro) (Cheomdangwahak-ro); Myeonjeop-gil	Jeongeup City	Ibam-myeon	
Sinwol IS	신월 교차로	Prefectural Route 708 (Jeongeupsa-eup)	Jeongeup City	Sanggyo-dong	
Sinwol Tunnel	신월터널		Jeongeup City	Sanggyo-dong	Approximately 860m
Sinwol Tunnel			Jeongeup City	Naejangsan-dong	Approximately 860m
Songsan 2 IS	송산2 교차로	Cheonbyeon-ro	Jeongeup City	Naejangsan-dong	
Songsan IS	송산 교차로	National Route 21; National Route 29 (Naejangsan-ro)	Jeongeup City	Naejangsan-dong	National Route 21 overlap
Yongho Tunnel	용호터널		Jeongeup City	Naejangsan-dong	National Route 21 overlap Right tunnel: Approximately 285m Left tunnel: Approximately 250m
Yongho Tunnel			Jeongeup City	Jangmyeong-dong	National Route 21 overlap Right tunnel: Approximately 285m Left tunnel: Approximately 250m
Yongho IS	용호 교차로	Prefectural Route 708 (Jeongeupbuk-ro)	Jeongeup City	Jangmyeong-dong	National Route 21 overlap Prefectural Route 708 overlap
Bakdong IS	박동 교차로	Seobusaneopdo-ro	Jeongeup City	Buk-myeon	National Route 21 overlap Prefectural Route 708 overlap
Jeongeup Bridge	정읍대교		Jeongeup City	Buk-myeon	National Route 21 overlap Prefectural Route 708 overlap
Hwahae IS	화해 교차로	Prefectural Route 708 (Chilbuk-ro)	Jeongeup City	Buk-myeon	National Route 21 overlap Prefectural Route 708 overlap
Usan IS	우산 교차로	Jeongeupbuk-ro	Jeongeup City	Jeongu-myeon	National Route 21 overlap
Jigyeong IS	지경 교차로	Taego-ro	Jeongeup City	Jeongu-myeon	National Route 21 overlap
Taese Bridge	태세교		Jeongeup City	Jeongu-myeon	National Route 21 overlap
Taese Bridge			Jeongeup City	Taein-myeon	National Route 21 overlap
Taein IS	태인 교차로	Seokji-ro	Jeongeup City	Taein-myeon	National Route 21 overlap Taein IC (Connected with Honam Expressway)
Wangnim IS	왕림 교차로	National Route 30	Jeongeup City	Taein-myeon	National Route 21 overlap
Oseong IS	오성 교차로	Jeongeupbuk-ro	Jeongeup City	Taein-myeon	National Route 21 overlap
Nokdong IS	녹동 교차로	Jeongeupbuk-ro	Jeongeup City	Ongdong-myeon	National Route 21 overlap
Yongho IS	용호 교차로	Jeongeupbuk-ro	Jeongeup City	Ongdong-myeon	National Route 21 overlap
Sotteun Tunnel	솥튼터널		Jeongeup City	Ongdong-myeon	National Route 21 overlap Right tunnel: Approximately 780m Left tunnel: Approximately 700m
Sotteun Tunnel			Jeongeup City	Gamgok-myeon	National Route 21 overlap Right tunnel: Approximately 780m Left tunnel: Approximately 700m
Tongseok IS	통석 교차로	Geumpyeong-ro; Jeongeupbuk-ro	Jeongeup City	Gamgok-myeon	National Route 21 overlap
Wonpyeong IS	원평 교차로	Prefectural Route 714; Prefectural Route 736 (Bonghwang-ro)	Gimje City	Geumsan-myeon	National Route 21 overlap
Naksu IS	낙수 교차로	Prefectural Route 712 (Bongnam-ro) (Wonpyeong-ro); Geumpyeong-ro; Guseong-gil; Naksu-gil	Gimje City	Geumsan-myeon	National Route 21 overlap
Bongeun IS	봉은 교차로	Guseong-gil; Bongeun-gil	Gimje City	Geumsan-myeon	National Route 21 overlap
Yongbok IS	용복 교차로	Yangsi-ro	Gimje City	Geumgu-myeon	National Route 21 overlap
geumgu IS	금구사거리	Daesong-ro	Gimje City	Geumgu-myeon	National Route 21 overlap
Geumgu IC	금구 나들목	Prefectural Route 714 (Pungyo-ro)	Gimje City	Geumgu-myeon	National Route 21 overlap Connected with Gimje IC
Woljeon IS	월전삼거리	Bongdu-ro	Gimje City	Geumgu-myeon	National Route 21 overlap
Daeya IS	대야삼거리	Prefectural Route 713 (Iseonam-ro)	Gimje City	Geumgu-myeon	National Route 21 overlap
Ssukgogae IS	쑥고개 교차로	National Route 21; National Route 27 (Honam-ro); Ssukgogae-ro	Jeonju City	Wansan District	National Route 21 overlap National Route 27 overlap
Iseo IS	이서 교차로	Prefectural Route 716 (Kongjwipatjwi-ro)	Wanju County	Iseo-myeon	National Route 21 overlap National Route 27 overlap
Daeheung IS	대흥 교차로	National Route 21; National Route 26 (Beonyeong-ro)	Jeonju City	Deokjin District	National Route 21 overlap National Route 27 overlap
Yongjeong JCT	용정 분기점	National Route 21 (Saemangeumbuk-ro)	Jeonju City	Deokjin District	National Route 27 overlap
Mangyeonggang Bridge	만경강교		Jeonju City	Deokjin District	National Route 27 overlap
Mangyeonggang Bridge			Wanju County	Samnye-eup	National Route 27 overlap
Haejeon JCT Haejeon IS	해전 분기점 해전 교차로	National Route 27 (Pyeongdong-ro)	Wanju County	Samnye-eup	National Route 27 overlap
Ssangjeong IS	쌍정 교차로	Gungseong-ro; Samnye-ro	Wanju County	Samnye-eup	
Ssangjeong IS		Gungseong-ro; Samnye-ro	Iksan City	Wanggung-myeon	
Onsu IS	온수 교차로	Geumo-gil; Wangchun-gil	Iksan City	Wanggung-myeon	
Ssangje Overpass	쌍제육교	Wangchun-gil	Iksan City	Wanggung-myeon	
Wanggung Bridge	왕궁교		Iksan City	Wanggung-myeon	
Cheondong IS	천동 교차로	Gungseong-ro	Iksan City	Wanggung-myeon	
Singung Overpass	신궁육교		Iksan City	Wanggung-myeon	
Singung Overpass			Iksan City	Chunpo-myeon	
Palbong IS	팔봉 교차로	Gungseong-ro; Deokji 1-gil Tamni-gil	Iksan City	Chunpo-myeon	
Palbong IS		Gungseong-ro; Deokji 1-gil Tamni-gil	Iksan City	Wanggung-myeon	
Geumma IS	금마 교차로	Prefectural Route 722 (Muwang-ro)	Iksan City	Geumma-myeon	
Donggodo IS	동고도 교차로	Godo-gil	Iksan City	Geumma-myeon	
Yeonmyeong IS	연명 교차로	Prefectural Route 799 (Hoban-ro)	Iksan City	Yeosan-myeon	Prefectural Route 799 overlap
No name	(이름 없음)	Prefectural Route 799 (Garam-ro)	Iksan City	Yeosan-myeon	Prefectural Route 799 overlap
Sinri IS	신리 교차로	Prefectural Route 799 (Garam-ro)	Iksan City	Yeosan-myeon	
No name	(이름 없음)	Prefectural Route 799 (Yeogang-ro)	Iksan City	Yeosan-myeon	
Yeosan IS	여산 교차로	Garam-ro	Iksan City	Yeosan-myeon	
(Eco-corridor)	(생태통로)		Iksan City	Yeosan-myeon	Continuation into South Chungcheong Province

=== South Chungcheong Province (South of Daejeon) ===
Name	Hangul name	Connection	Location		Note
(Eco-corridor)	(생태통로)		Nonsan City	Yeonmu-eup	North Jeolla Province - South Chungcheong Province border line
Majeon IS	마전 교차로	Hwanghwa-ro; Deugan-daero 84beon-gil	Nonsan City	Yeonmu-eup	
Sinmyeong Overpass	신명육교	Gonaegok-ro	Nonsan City	Yeonmu-eup	
Hwanghwa IS	황화 교차로	Hwanghwa-ro	Nonsan City	Yeonmu-eup	
Korea Army Training Center Yeonmu Elementary School	육군훈련소 연무초등학교		Nonsan City	Yeonmu-eup	
Yeonmu IS	연무삼거리	Ansim-ro	Nonsan City	Yeonmu-eup	
Masan IS	마산사거리	Yeonmu-ro	Nonsan City	Yeonmu-eup	
Dongsan IS	동산 교차로	Prefectural Route 68 (Dongan-ro)	Nonsan City	Yeonmu-eup	
Toyang IS	토양삼거리	Ansim-ro	Nonsan City	Eunjin-myeon	
Toyang IS	토양사거리	Yeoneun-ro	Nonsan City	Eunjin-myeon	
Bangchuk IS	방축사거리	Maejukheon-ro; Bangchuk-gil	Nonsan City	Eunjin-myeon	
Eunjin IS	은진사거리	Tapjeong-ro	Nonsan City	Eunjin-myeon	
Fire Station IS	소방서사거리	Daehak-ro; Wondaengi-gil	Nonsan City	Chwiam-dong	
Gangsan IS	강산사거리	Nonsan-daero; Deugan-daero	Nonsan City	Buchang-dong	
Nonsan Central Elementary School	논산중앙초등학교		Nonsan City	Chwiam-dong	
Naedong IS	내동사거리	Simin-ro	Nonsan City	Chwiam-dong	
Baek Je Hospital	백제종합병원		Nonsan City	Chwiam-dong	
Chwiam IS	취암사거리	Jungang-ro	Nonsan City	Chwiam-dong	
Jugong IS	주공사거리	Nonsan-daero 348beon-gil Nonsan-daero 351beon-gil	Nonsan City	Chwiam-dong	
Gongun IS	공운삼거리	Cheyuk-ro	Nonsan City	Chwiam-dong	
Nonsan Public Health Center Nonsan Welfare Center	논산시보건소 논산종합사회복지관		Nonsan City	Chwiam-dong	
Gongun Bridge	공운교	Prefectural Route 643 (Gwanchok-ro)	Nonsan City	Chwiam-dong	
Gyebaek IS	계백사거리	Gyebaek-ro; Buin-gil	Nonsan City	Chwiam-dong	
Gyebaek Bridge	계백교		Nonsan City	Chwiam-dong	
Gyebaek Bridge			Nonsan City	Bujeok-myeon	
Bujeok IS	부적 교차로	National Route 4	Nonsan City	Bujeok-myeon	National Route 4 overlap
Magupyeong IS	마구평삼거리	Prefectural Route 691 (Baekilhyeon-ro)	Nonsan City	Bujeok-myeon	National Route 4 overlap
Oeseong IS	외성삼거리	Chunggok-ro; Buhwang-gil	Nonsan City	Bujeok-myeon	National Route 4 overlap
Imri IS	임리삼거리	Gwanchang-ro	Nonsan City	Yeonsan-myeon	National Route 4 overlap
Yeonsan IS	연산사거리	Prefectural Route 697 (Hwangsanbeol-ro)	Nonsan City	Yeonsan-myeon	National Route 4 overlap
Gaetaesa Station	개태사역		Nonsan City	Yeonsan-myeon	National Route 4 overlap
Gyeryong Culture & Arts Center	계룡문화예술의전당		Gyeryong City	Eomsa-dong	National Route 4 overlap
Yudong IS	유동삼거리	Prefectural Route 645 (Munhwa-ro)	Gyeryong City	Eomsa-dong	National Route 4 overlap
Samjin IS	삼진삼거리	Eomsajungang-ro	Gyeryong City	Eomsa-dong	National Route 4 overlap
Yangjeong Intercity Bus Stop	양정시외버스정류소		Gyeryong City	Eomsa-dong	National Route 4 overlap
Yangjeong IS	양정삼거리	Geumam-ro	Gyeryong City	Eomsa-dong	National Route 4 overlap
Yeonhwa IS	연화 교차로	Gyeryong-daero	Gyeryong City	Eomsa-dong	National Route 4 overlap Continuation into Daejeon
Gyeryong Bridge	계룡대교		Gyeryong City	Eomsa-dong	National Route 4 overlap Continuation into Daejeon

=== Daejeon ===
Name	Hangul name	Connection	Location		Note
Gyeryong Bridge	계룡대교		Daejeon	Yuseong District	National Route 4 overlap South Chungcheong Province - Daejeon border line
Duma IS	두마 교차로	National Route 4 (Gyebaek-ro)	Daejeon	Yuseong District	National Route 4 overlap South Chungcheong Province - Daejeon border line
Jungse IS	중세 교차로	Gyebaek-ro 93beon-gil Sedong-ro 249beon-gil	Daejeon	Yuseong District	
Sedong IS	세동 교차로	Sedong-ro	Daejeon	Yuseong District	
Gyeryong 1 Tunnel	계룡1터널		Daejeon	Yuseong District	Approximately 2,665m Continuation into South Chungcheong Province

=== South Chungcheong Province (South of Sejong City) ===
Name	Hangul name	Connection	Location		Note
Gyeryong 1 Tunnel	계룡1터널		Gongju City	Banpo-myeon	Approximately 2,665m Daejeon - South Chungcheong Province border line
Gyeryong 2 Tunnel	계룡2터널		Gongju City	Banpo-myeon	Approximately 706m
Sabong Bridge	사봉교		Gongju City	Banpo-myeon	
Sapjae IS	삽재 교차로	National Route 32 (Geumbyeok-ro)	Gongju City	Banpo-myeon	National Route 32 overlap
Bakjeongja IS	박정자삼거리	Donghaksa 1-ro	Gongju City	Banpo-myeon	National Route 32 overlap
Huimang IS	희망 교차로	Sanghasin-gil	Gongju City	Banpo-myeon	National Route 32 overlap
Gongam IS	공암 교차로	Songgok-ro	Gongju City	Banpo-myeon	National Route 32 overlap
Banpo IS	반포 교차로	National Route 32 (Geumbyeok-ro)	Gongju City	Banpo-myeon	National Route 32 overlap
Susil Overpass	수실육교	Namsan-gil; Seonggang-gil; Susil 2-gil	Gongju City	Banpo-myeon	
Yongsu 2 Bridge	용수2교		Gongju City	Banpo-myeon	Continuation into Sejong City

=== Sejong City·South Chungcheong Province ===
Name	Hangul name	Connection	Location		Note
Yongsu 2 Bridge	용수2교		Sejong City	Geumnam-myeon	South Chungcheong Province - Sejong City border line
Yongsu 3 Bridge Yongsu 4 Bridge	용수3교 용수4교		Sejong City	Geumnam-myeon	
Duman IS	두만 교차로	Bugyuseong-daero	Sejong City	Geumnam-myeon	
Gamseong IS	감성 교차로	Angeum-ro	Sejong City	Geumnam-myeon	
Balsan IS	발산 교차로	Balsan 1-gil	Sejong City	Geumnam-myeon	
Balsan Roundabout	발산 회전교차로	Yongpo-ro; Balsan 1-gil	Sejong City	Geumnam-myeon	
Daepyeong IS	대평 교차로	Sejong 1-ro	Sejong City	Geumnam-myeon	
Daepyeong IS	대평 교차로	Prefectural Route 96 (Haengbok-daero)	Sejong City	Boram-dong	Prefectural Route 96 overlap
Haknarae Bridge	학나래교		Sejong City	Boram-dong	Prefectural Route 96 overlap
Haknarae Bridge		Yeongi-myeon	Sejong City		Prefectural Route 96 overlap
Haknarae Bridge			Sejong City	Hansol-dong	Prefectural Route 96 overlap
Songwon IS	송원 교차로	Prefectural Route 96 (Geumsong-ro) (Nari-ro)	Sejong City	Hansol-dong	Prefectural Route 96 overlap
Saori Underpass	사오리지하차도	Eoul-ro	Sejong City	Saerom-dong	
No name	(이름 없음)	National Route 36 (Janggi-ro); Gareum-ro	Sejong City	Wesr: Saerom-dong; East: Jongchon-dong	National Route 36 overlap Juchu Underpass
Neobitteul IS	너비뜰교차로	Doum 3-ro	Sejong City	West: Goun-dong; East: Jongchon-dong	National Route 36 overlap Juchu Underpass
No name	(이름 없음)	Dasom 1-ro	Sejong City	West: Goun-dong; East: Areum-dong	National Route 36 overlap Juchu Underpass
Onbit Elementary School	온빛초등학교		Sejong City	West: Goun-dong; East: Areum-dong	National Route 36 overlap Juchu Underpass
No name	(이름 없음)	Bodeum 8-ro	Sejong City	West: Goun-dong; East: Areum-dong	National Route 36 overlap Juchu Underpass
Mogae Overpass	모개고가차도	National Route 43 (Jeongansejong-ro); Mirinae-ro	Sejong City	Yeongi-myeon	National Route 36 overlap
Bitdol Tunnel	빗돌터널		Sejong City	Yeongi-myeon	National Route 36 overlap Approximately 310m
Yeongi IS	연기삼거리	Suwang-ro	Sejong City	Yeongi-myeon	National Route 36 overlap
Yeongi IS	연기사거리	Dangsan-ro	Sejong City	Yeongi-myeon	National Route 36 overlap Former Prefectural Route 627
Yeongi Complex IS	연기공단사거리	Gongdan-ro	Sejong City	Yeongi-myeon	National Route 36 overlap
Bongam Bridge	봉암교		Sejong City	Yeongi-myeon	National Route 36 overlap
Bongam Bridge			Sejong City	Yeonseo-myeon	National Route 36 overlap
No name	(이름 없음)	Bongam-gil	Sejong City	Yeonseo-myeon	National Route 36 overlap
Wolam Bridge	월암교		Sejong City	Yeonseo-myeon	National Route 36 overlap
Wolha IS	월하오거리	Dangsan-ro	Sejong City	Yeonseo-myeon	National Route 36 overlap
Beonam IS	번암사거리	National Route 36 (Heomanseok-ro)	Sejong City	Jochiwon-eup	National Route 36 overlap
Xi Apartment Entrance	자이아파트입구	Dowon-ro	Sejong City	Jochiwon-eup	
Sinheung IS	신흥사거리	Daecheop-ro	Sejong City	Jochiwon-eup	
Ukil IS	욱일삼거리	Haengbok-gil; Hyangnamu-gil	Sejong City	Jochiwon-eup	
Sejong Fire Department	세종특별자치시 소방본부		Sejong City	Jochiwon-eup	
Sejong Girls' High School	세종여고사거리	Bongsan-ro; Dolmaru 1-gil	Sejong City	Jochiwon-eup	
Seochang IS	서창사거리	Chunghyeon-ro; Wonmaru-gil	Sejong City	Jochiwon-eup	
Korea University Sejong Campus Korea University Express Bus Stop	고려대학교 세종캠퍼스 고대고속버스정류소		Sejong City	Jochiwon-eup	
Sinan 1-ri IS	신안1리사거리	Saenae-ro; Seopgol-gil	Sejong City	Jochiwon-eup	
No name	(이름 없음)	Heomanseok-ro	Sejong City	Jochiwon-eup	
Hongik University Sejong Campus Hongik University Express Bus Stop Seochang station	홍익대학교 세종캠퍼스 홍대고속버스정류소 서창역		Sejong City	Jochiwon-eup	
Sinan 2-ri IS	신안2리사거리	Unjusan-ro; Anteo-gil	Sejong City	Jochiwon-eup	
Jocheon 1 Bridge	조천1교		Sejong City	Jochiwon-eup	
Jocheon 1 Bridge			Cheongju City	Heungdeok District Osong-eup	
Jocheon 2 Bridge	조천2교		Sejong City	Jeondong-myeon	
Jeondong IS	전동 교차로	Jeondong-ro	Sejong City	Jeondong-myeon	Former Prefectural Route 693
Seokgok IS	석곡교	Sangseokgok-gil	Sejong City	Jeondong-myeon	
Cheongram IS	청람 교차로	Dongmakgol-gil	Sejong City	Jeondong-myeon	
Jocheon 3 Bridge	조천3교		Sejong City	Jeondong-myeon	
(Migok IS)	(미곡삼거리)	Unjusan-ro	Sejong City	Jeonui-myeon	
Jocheon 4 Bridge	조천4교		Sejong City	Jeonui-myeon	
Jocheon 4 Bridge			Sejong City	Jeondong-myeon	
Jocheon 5 Bridge	조천5교		Sejong City	Jeonui-myeon	
Jeonui IS	전의 교차로	Uidangjeonui-ro	Sejong City	Jeonui-myeon	Former Prefectural Route 691
Yucheon IS	유천 교차로	National Route 23; National Route 43 (Charyeong-ro)	Sejong City	Jeonui-myeon	National Route 23, National Route 43 overlap
Yujeong 2 Bridge	유정2교		Sejong City	Jeonui-myeon	National Route 23, National Route 43 overlap
Yujeong 2 Bridge			Cheonan City	Dongnam District Gwangdeok-myeon	National Route 23, National Route 43 overlap
Gujeong IS	구정사거리	Unjusan-ro; Haengjeong-gil	Cheonan City	Dongnam District Gwangdeok-myeon	National Route 23, National Route 43 overlap
Haengjeong IS	행정삼거리	Prefectural Route 623 (Charyeonggogae-ro)	Sejong City	Sojeong-myeon	National Route 23, National Route 43 overlap
Undang-ri IS	운당리삼거리	Sojeonggu-gil	Sejong City	Sojeong-myeon	National Route 23, National Route 43 overlap
Undang IS	운당 교차로	National Route 43 (Sejongpyeongtaek-ro); Sojeongangol 1-gil	Sejong City	Sojeong-myeon	National Route 23, National Route 43 overlap
Gokgyocheon Bridge	곡교천교		Sejong City	Sojeong-myeon	National Route 23 overlap
Gokgyocheon Bridge IS	곡교천교삼거리	Gasong-ro	Sejong City	Sojeong-myeon	National Route 23 overlap
Sojeong Bridge	소정대교		Sejong City	Sojeong-myeon	National Route 23 overlap
Fornt of Sojeong Overpass	소정육교앞	Gungri-gil; Sojeonggu-gil	Sejong City	Sojeong-myeon	National Route 23 overlap
Daegok IS	대곡사거리	Chwigeumheon-ro	Sejong City	Sojeong-myeon	National Route 23 overlap Continuation into South Chungcheong Province

=== South Chungcheong Province (North of Sejong City) ===
Name	Hangul name	Connection	Location		Note
Third Sosa Bridge	제3소사교		Cheonan City	Dongnam District Mokcheon-eup	National Route 23 overlap Sejong City - South Chungcheong Province border line
South Cheonan IC	남천안 나들목	Nonsan-Cheonan Expressway	Cheonan City	Dongnam District Mokcheon-eup	National Route 23 overlap
Doriti IS	도리티삼거리	Cheongdangsaneop-gil	Cheonan City	Dongnam District Mokcheon-eup	National Route 23 overlap
Doriti	도리티		Cheonan City	Dongnam District Mokcheon-eup	National Route 23 overlap
Doriti			Cheonan City	Dongnam District	National Route 23 overlap
Sun Moon University Cheonan Campus	선문대학교 천안캠퍼스		Cheonan City	Dongnam District	National Route 23 overlap
Cheonan Girls' High School IS (Cheonan Life Sports Park)	천안여고삼거리 (천안생활체육공원)	Samnyong 3-gil	Cheonan City	Dongnam District	National Route 23 overlap
Cheongsam IS	청삼 교차로	National Route 21 (Nambu-daero)	Cheonan City	Dongnam District	National Route 23 overlap
Cheonan Museum Cheonan Three-way Park	천안박물관 천안삼거리공원		Cheonan City	Dongnam District	National Route 23 overlap
Samnyong IS	삼룡사거리	Chungjeol-ro	Cheonan City	Dongnam District	National Route 23 overlap
Gulul IS	굴울사거리	Jeonggol 1-gil	Cheonan City	Dongnam District	National Route 23 overlap
Guseong IS	구성삼거리	Chungmu-ro	Cheonan City	Dongnam District	National Route 23 overlap
Cheonan Dongnam Fire Station	천안동남소방서		Cheonan City	Dongnam District	National Route 23 overlap
Gojae IS	고재사거리	Yuryang-ro; Gojae 15-gil	Cheonan City	Dongnam District	National Route 23 overlap
Road origin spot IS	도로원점삼거리	Beodeul-ro	Cheonan City	Dongnam District	National Route 23 overlap
Eastern IS	동부사거리	Taejosan-gil; Wonseongcheon 1-gil	Cheonan City	Dongnam District	National Route 23 overlap
Cheonan-ro IS (Cheonan-ro Underpass)	천안로사거리 (천안로지하차도)	Cheonan-daero; Mannam-ro	Cheonan City	Dongnam District	National Route 23 overlap
Cheonan IC	천안 나들목	Gyeongbu Expressway; Prefectural Route 23 (Manghyang-ro)	Cheonan City	Dongnam District	National Route 23 overlap
Cheonan Bridge	천안대교		Cheonan City	Dongnam District	
Cheonan Tunnel	천안터널		Cheonan City	Dongnam District	Approximately 280m
Cheonan Tunnel			Cheonan City	Seobuk District	Approximately 280m
Northern Overpass	북부고가교	Samseong-daero; Cheonan-daero	Cheonan City	Seobuk District	
Budaedong IS	부대동사거리	Budaejungang-gil; Anteo-gil; Hayadeul-gil	Cheonan City	Seobuk District	
Gongdae IS	공대사거리	Gongdae-gil; Sindangsaeteo 2-gil	Cheonan City	Seobuk District	
Kongju National University Cheonan Campus	공주대학교 천안캠퍼스		Cheonan City	Seobuk District	
Gyojeong IS	교정삼거리	Cheonilgo 1-gil	Cheonan City	Seobuk District	
Mega Mart Cheonan store Cheonan agricultural products wholesale market	메가마트 천안점 천안농산물도매시장		Cheonan City	Seobuk District	
Eopseong IS	업성동삼거리	Beonyeong-ro	Cheonan City	Seobuk District	
Jiksan Station IS (Jiksan station)	직산역삼거리 (직산역)		Cheonan City	Seobuk District Jiksan-eup	
Jiksan IS	직산사거리	Bongju-ro; Busong-ro	Cheonan City	Seobuk District Jiksan-eup	
Suheol IS	수헐 교차로	National Route 34 (Samsa-ro); Cheonan-daero	Cheonan City	Seobuk District Jiksan-eup	National Route 34 overlap
Sangdeok Overpass	상덕과선교		Cheonan City	Seobuk District Jiksan-eup	National Route 34 overlap
Sangdeok Overpass			Cheonan City	Seobuk District Seonghwan-eup	National Route 34 overlap
Maeju IS (Maeju Overpass)	매주 교차로 (매주육교)	Prefectural Route 70 (Yeonamyulgeum-ro)	Cheonan City	Seobuk District Seonghwan-eup	National Route 34 overlap
Usin 2 IS	우신2 교차로	National Route 34 (Samsa-ro)	Cheonan City	Seobuk District Seonghwan-eup	National Route 34 overlap
Seonghwan Railway Overpass	성환철도육교		Cheonan City	Seobuk District Seonghwan-eup	
Daehong IS	대홍 교차로	Cheonan-daero	Cheonan City	Seobuk District Seonghwan-eup	
Daehong IS	대홍삼거리	Yeonam-ro	Cheonan City	Seobuk District Seonghwan-eup	
Angung IS	안궁삼거리	Munhwachon 1-gil	Cheonan City	Seobuk District Seonghwan-eup	
Anseong stream Bridge	안성천교		Cheonan City	Seobuk District Seonghwan-eup	Continuation into Gyeonggi Province

=== Gyeonggi Province (South of Seoul) ===
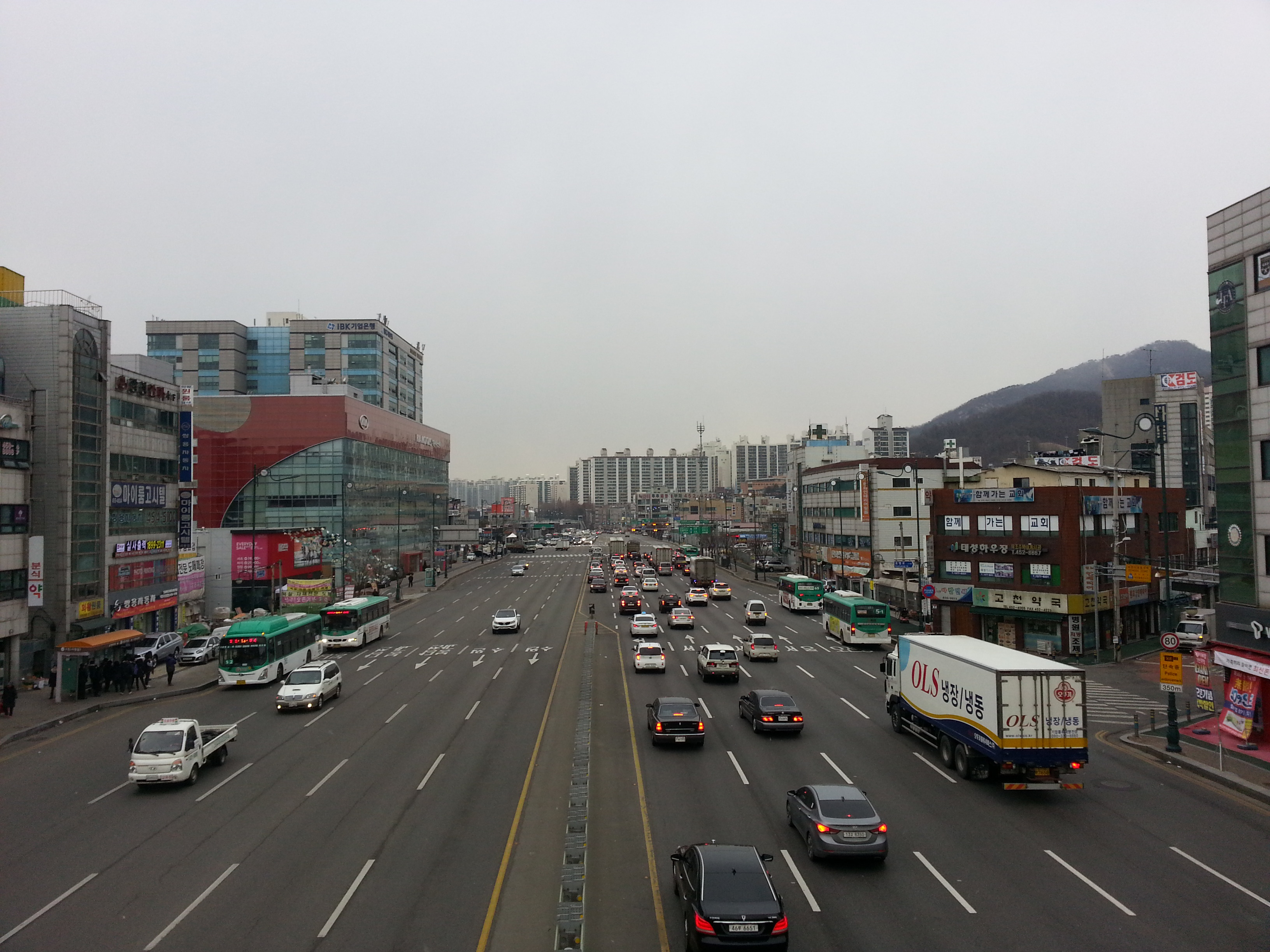
Gyeongsu-daero

Road name	Name	Hangul name	Connection	Location		Note
Gyeonggi-daero	Anseong stream Bridge Seojae Bridge	안성천교 서재교		Pyeongtaek City	Sinpyeong-dong	South Chungcheong Province - Gyeonggi Province border line
Gyeonggi-daero	Bijeon Underpass IS (Bijeon Underpass)	비전지하차도사거리 (비전지하차도)	National Route 38 (Seodong-daero)	Pyeongtaek City	Sinpyeong-dong	
Gyeonggi-daero	Front of Pyeongtaek Culture Center	평택문화회관앞	Jungang-ro	Pyeongtaek City	Sinpyeong-dong	
Gyeonggi-daero	Front of Pyeongtaek Culture Center		Jungang-ro	Pyeongtaek City	Bijeon-dong	
Gyeonggi-daero	Pyeongtaek City Hall	평택시청		Pyeongtaek City	Bijeon-dong	
Gyeonggi-daero	Behind City Hall IS	시청뒤사거리	Pyeongnam-ro	Pyeongtaek City	Bijeon-dong	
Gyeonggi-daero	New Core IS	뉴코아사거리	Munhwachon-ro; Pyeongtaek 5-ro 114beon-gil	Pyeongtaek City	Bijeon-dong	
Gyeonggi-daero	Bijeon IS	비전사거리	Pyeongnam-ro	Pyeongtaek City	Bijeon-dong	
Gyeonggi-daero	Deokdong IS	덕동사거리	Bijeon 3-ro Pyeongtaek 4-ro	Pyeongtaek City	Bijeon-dong	
Gyeonggi-daero	Hansung Apartment IS	한성아파트사거리	Manse-ro; Pyeongtaek 2-ro	Pyeongtaek City	Bijeon-dong	
Gyeonggi-daero	Prosecutors' Office Entrance IS	검찰청입구사거리	Pyeongtaek 1-ro	Pyeongtaek City	Bijeon-dong	
Gyeonggi-daero	Dongsak Bridge	동삭교		Pyeongtaek City	Bijeon-dong	
Gyeonggi-daero	Dongsak Bridge			Pyeongtaek City	Segyo-dong	
Gyeonggi-daero	Beobwon IS	법원사거리	Prefectural Route 317 (Dongsak-ro)	Pyeongtaek City	Segyo-dong	
Gyeonggi-daero	Gyeonggi Weigh station IS	경기계량소사거리	Segyogongwon-ro	Pyeongtaek City	Segyo-dong	
Gyeonggi-daero	Taeyoung Apartment IS	태영아파트사거리	Segyo-ro	Pyeongtaek City	Segyo-dong	
Gyeonggi-daero	Pyeongtaek Industrial Complex IS	평택공단사거리	Segyosandan-ro; Eunsilgoga-gil	Pyeongtaek City	Segyo-dong	
Gyeonggi-daero	Car Sales Complex Pumyang Apartment IS KyungDong Navien IS K2 Bowling Alley	자동차매매단지 범양아파트삼거리 경동나비엔삼거리; K2볼링장후문		Pyeongtaek City	Segyo-dong	
Gyeonggi-daero	Hanshin Gas Station IS	한신주유소삼거리	Pyeongtaek-ro	Pyeongtaek City	Segyo-dong	
Gyeonggi-daero	Jije station (Jije Station IS)	지제역 (지제역사거리)	Yeongsin-ro	Pyeongtaek City	Segyo-dong	
Gyeonggi-daero	Songtan Intersection IS	송탄교차로사거리	Jije-ro	Pyeongtaek City	Segyo-dong	
Gyeonggi-daero	Songtan IS	송탄 교차로	National Route 45 (Nambuk-daero)	Pyeongtaek City	Segyo-dong	
Gyeonggi-daero	Mogok-dong Weigh station IS	모곡동계량소삼거리	Mogok-gil	Pyeongtaek City	Songtan-dong	
Gyeonggi-daero	Mogok-dong IS	모곡동삼거리	Sandan-ro 64beon-gil	Pyeongtaek City	Songtan-dong	
Gyeonggi-daero	Gwangcheon town Entrance IS	광천마을입구삼거리	Gwangcheonmaeul-gil	Pyeongtaek City	Songtan-dong	
Gyeonggi-daero	Songtan Industrial Complex IS	송탄공단삼거리	Sandan-ro	Pyeongtaek City	Songtan-dong	
Gyeonggi-daero	Purina PetCare IS Kwang Dong Pharmaceutical IS Home plus Songtan Store	퓨리나사료사거리 광동제약사거리 홈플러스 송탄점		Pyeongtaek City	Jungang-dong	
Gyeonggi-daero	Jangdang IS	장당삼거리	Songtan-ro	Pyeongtaek City	Jungang-dong	
Gyeonggi-daero	Jangdang Middle School IS	장당중학교사거리	Jangdang-gil; Songtan-ro 40beon-gil	Pyeongtaek City	Jungang-dong	
Gyeonggi-daero	Hyundai Apartment IS	현대아파트사거리	Prefectural Route 302 (Cheongwon-ro)	Pyeongtaek City	Jungang-dong	Jungang Underpass
Gyeonggi-daero	Pyeongtaek Hospital IS	평택병원사거리	Jeongam-ro	Pyeongtaek City	Jungang-dong	Jungang Underpass
Gyeonggi-daero	Booyoung Apartment Entrance IS	부영아파트입구사거리	Ichung-ro; Donggujae-gil	Pyeongtaek City	Jungang-dong	
Gyeonggi-daero	Daejin Apartment Entrance	대진아파트입구	Ichung-ro	Pyeongtaek City	Jungang-dong	
Gyeonggi-daero	Songtan Culture & Arts Center	송탄문예회관앞	Seojeong-ro	Pyeongtaek City	Jungang-dong	
Gyeonggi-daero	Songtan Culture & Arts Center		Seojeong-ro	Pyeongtaek City	Seojeong-dong	
Gyeonggi-daero	Songtan Branch Office IS (Pyeongtaek City Hall Songtan Branch Office)	송탄출장소사거리 (평택시청 송탄출장소)	Gwangwangteukgu-ro	Pyeongtaek City	Seojeong-dong	
Gyeonggi-daero	Gyeonggi Library	경기도립도서관	Seojeongbuk-ro	Pyeongtaek City	Seojeong-dong	
Gyeonggi-daero	Songhyeon Elementary School Woosung Apartment IS	송현초등학교 우성아파트삼거리		Pyeongtaek City	Jisan-dong	
Gyeonggi-daero	Jisanhyeondae IS	지산현대사거리	Songtangongwon-ro	Pyeongtaek City	Jisan-dong	
Gyeonggi-daero	Jisan IS	지산사거리	Jisan-ro	Pyeongtaek City	Jisan-dong	
Gyeonggi-daero	Life Apartment IS	라이프아파트사거리	Jisancheon-ro	Pyeongtaek City	Songbuk-dong	
Gyeonggi-daero	Ojwa IS	오좌사거리	Tanhyeon-ro; Ojwadong-gil	Pyeongtaek City	Songbuk-dong	
Gyeonggi-daero	Songtan Fire Station (Songtan Fire Station)	송탄소방서사거리 (송탄소방서)	Sambong-ro	Pyeongtaek City	Songbuk-dong	
Gyeonggi-daero	Sinjang Bridge	신장교		Pyeongtaek City	Songbuk-dong	
Gyeonggi-daero	Sinjang Bridge			Pyeongtaek City	Jinwi-myeon	
Gyeonggi-daero	Air Base IS	비행장사거리	Prefectural Route 306 (Songtangoga-gil)	Pyeongtaek City	Jinwi-myeon	
Gyeonggi-daero	Sirin IS	신리삼거리	Silli-gil	Pyeongtaek City	Jinwi-myeon	
Gyeonggi-daero	Jinwi Bridge	진위교		Pyeongtaek City	Jinwi-myeon	
Gyeonggi-daero	Habuk IS	하북삼거리	Habuk 1-gil	Pyeongtaek City	Jinwi-myeon	
Gyeonggi-daero	Jinwi station (Jinwi Station IS)	진위역 (진위역삼거리)	Prefectural Route 314; Prefectural Route 317 (Jinwiseo-ro)	Pyeongtaek City	Jinwi-myeon	Prefectural Route 317 overlap
Gyeonggi-daero	Sari IS	사리 교차로	Bangkkoji-gil	Pyeongtaek City	Jinwi-myeon	Prefectural Route 317 overlap
Gyeonggi-daero	Gagok-ri Entrance IS	가곡리입구삼거리	Gagok-gil	Pyeongtaek City	Jinwi-myeon	Prefectural Route 317 overlap
Gyeonggi-daero	Lotte Confectionery IS	롯데제과삼거리		Pyeongtaek City	Jinwi-myeon	Prefectural Route 317 overlap
Gyeonggi-daero	Yamak-ri Entrance IS	야막리입구사거리	LG-ro; Yamak-gil	Pyeongtaek City	Jinwi-myeon	Prefectural Route 317 overlap
Gyeonggi-daero	Galgot-ri IS	갈곶리삼거리	Osan-ro	Osan City	Daewon-dong	Prefectural Route 317 overlap
Gyeonggi-daero	Hanil Apartment IS	한일아파트사거리		Osan City	Daewon-dong	Prefectural Route 317 overlap
Gyeonggi-daero	Hanjeon IS	한전사거리	Nambu-daero	Osan City	Daewon-dong	Prefectural Route 317 overlap
Gyeonggi-daero	E-mart Osan Store	이마트 오산점	Osan-ro 160beon-gil	Osan City	Daewon-dong	Prefectural Route 317 overlap
Gyeonggi-daero	Hansung Wedding Hall IS	한성예식장삼거리	Prefectural Route 310 (Milmeori-ro)	Osan City	Daewon-dong	Prefectural Route 310, 317 overlap
Gyeonggi-daero	Wondong IS	원동사거리	Wondong-ro	Osan City	Daewon-dong	Prefectural Route 310, Prefectural Route 317 overlap Indirect connected with Osan IC
Gyeonggi-daero	Front Sinyang Apartment	신양아파트앞	Daewon-ro	Osan City	Daewon-dong	Prefectural Route 310, 317 overlap
Gyeonggi-daero	Lotte Mart IS	롯데마트사거리	Seongho-daero	Osan City	Daewon-dong	Prefectural Route 310, 317 overlap
Gyeonggi-daero	Lotte Mart IS		Seongho-daero	Osan City	Jungang-dong	Prefectural Route 310, 317 overlap
Gyeonggi-daero	Lotte Mart Osan Store Jungang-dong Welfare Center	롯데마트 오산점 중앙동행정복지센터		Osan City	Jungang-dong	Prefectural Route 310, 317 overlap
Gyeonggi-daero	Stadium IS	운동장사거리	Prefectural Route 82; Prefectural Route 317 (Gyeonggidong-ro); Prefectural Route 310 (Osancheon-ro)	Osan City	Jungang-dong	Prefectural Route 310, 317 overlap
Gyeonggi-daero	Eungye Bridge	은계대교		Osan City	Jungang-dong	
Gyeonggi-daero	Eungye Bridge			Osan City	Sinjang-dong	
Gyeonggi-daero	Eungye Jugong Apartment	은계주공아파트		Osan City	Sinjang-dong	
Gyeonggi-daero	Maehol Middle School IS	매홀중학교앞삼거리	Hyeonchung-ro	Osan City	Sinjang-dong	
Gyeonggi-daero	Osan College station	오산대역		Osan City	Sinjang-dong	
Gyeonggi-daero	(Mulhyanggi Underpass)	(물향기지하차도)	Osandaeyeok-ro	Osan City	Sinjang-dong	
Gyeonggi-daero	No name	(이름 없음)	Sammi-ro; Cheonghak-ro	Osan City	Sinjang-dong	
Gyeonggi-daero	Naesammi-dong Entrance	내삼미동입구	Munheongong-ro	Osan City	Sinjang-dong	
Gyeonggi-daero	UN Forces First Battle Memorial	유엔군초전비		Osan City	Sinjang-dong	
Gyeonggi-daero	Semadae IS (Sema Underpass)	세마대사거리 (세마지하차도)	Doksanseong-ro; Munsi-ro	Osan City	Sema-dong	Connected with North Osan IC
Gyeonggi-daero	Byeongjeom Overpass	병점육교		Hwaseong City	Byeongjeom-dong	
Gyeonggi-daero	Home plus Byeongjeom Store	홈플러스 병점점		Hwaseong City	Byeongjeom-dong	
Gyeonggi-daero	Byeongjeom IS	병점사거리	Byeongjeom 3-ro	Hwaseong City	Byeongjeom-dong	Byeongjeom Underpass
Gyeonggi-daero	Byeongjeom Elementary School	병점초등학교		Hwaseong City	Jinan-dong	Byeongjeom Underpass
Gyeonggi-daero	Byeongjeom Underpass IS	병점지하차도 교차로	Prefectural Route 84; Prefectural Route 318 (Hyohaeng-ro)	Hwaseong City	Jinan-dong	Byeongjeom Underpass
Gyeonggi-daero	Jinan IS	진안 교차로	National Route 43 (Bongyeong-ro)	Hwaseong City	Jinan-dong	
Gyeonggi-daero	Daeseong Bridge	대성교		Hwaseong City	Jinan-dong	
	Daeseong Bridge			Suwon City	Gwonseon District	
Gyeongsu-daero	Air Base IS	비행장사거리		Suwon City	Gwonseon District	
Gyeongsu-daero	Muliranggyo IS	물이랑교사거리	Gyeongsu-daero 191beon-gil	Suwon City	Gwonseon District	
Gyeongsu-daero	Kwonseon Middle School	권선중학교		Suwon City	Gwonseon District	
Gyeongsu-daero	Terminal IS	터미널사거리	Deogyeong-daero	Suwon City	Gwonseon District	
Gyeongsu-daero	NC Department Store Suwon Store Suwon Bus Terminal	NC백화점 수원점 수원종합버스터미널		Suwon City	Gwonseon District	
Gyeongsu-daero	Seryu Culture Road IS	세류문화길삼거리	Gyeongsu-daero 302beon-gil	Suwon City	Gwonseon District	
Gyeongsu-daero	Segwon IS	세권사거리	Segwon-ro	Suwon City	Gwonseon District	
Gyeongsu-daero	Gwonseon IS	권선사거리	Gwonseon-ro	Suwon City	Gwonseon District	Hyowon Underpass
Gyeongsu-daero	City Hall IS	시청사거리	Hyowon-ro	Suwon City	Gwonseon District	Hyowon Underpass
Gyeongsu-daero	Ingye IS	인계사거리	Ingye-ro	Suwon City	Paldal District	
Gyeongsu-daero	Hanshin Apartment IS	한신아파트앞사거리	Jangdari-ro	Suwon City	Paldal District	Eastern Suwon Overpass
Gyeongsu-daero	Eastern Suwon IS	동수원사거리	National Route 42; National Route 43; Prefectural Route 98 (Jungbu-daero)	Suwon City	Paldal District	Dongsuwon Overpass; National Route 43 overlap
Gyeongsu-daero	Motgol IS	못골사거리	Seji-ro	Suwon City	Paldal District	National Route 43 overlap
Gyeongsu-daero	Changnyong Door	창룡문		Suwon City	Paldal District	National Route 43 overlap
Gyeongsu-daero	Changnyong Door IS (Changnyong Door Underpass)	창룡문사거리 (창룡문지하차도)	National Route 43 (Changnyong-daero)	Suwon City	Paldal District	National Route 43 overlap
Gyeongsu-daero	Changnyong Door IS (Changnyong Door Underpass)		National Route 43 (Changnyong-daero)	Suwon City	Jangan District	National Route 43 overlap
Gyeongsu-daero	Office of Education IS	교육청사거리	Gwanggyosan-ro; Paldal-ro	Suwon City	Jangan District	
Gyeongsu-daero	Suwon Office of Education	수원교육지원청		Suwon City	Jangan District	
Gyeongsu-daero	Younghwa Elementary School IS	영화초교사거리	Suseong-ro	Suwon City	Jangan District	
Gyeongsu-daero	Younghwa Elementary School	영화초등학교		Suwon City	Jangan District	
Gyeongsu-daero	Stadium IS	종합운동장사거리	Songjeong-ro	Suwon City	Jangan District	
Gyeongsu-daero	Suwon Sports Complex	수원종합운동장		Suwon City	Jangan District	
Gyeongsu-daero	Jangan-gu Office IS (Jangan Underpass)	장안구청사거리 (장안지하차도)	Songwon-ro	Suwon City	Jangan District	
Gyeongsu-daero	Home plus Buksuwon Store North Suwon Fashion Outlet	홈플러스 북수원점 북수원패션아울렛		Suwon City	Jangan District	
Gyeongsu-daero	Daedongumul IS	대동우물사거리	Gyeongsu-daero 973beon-gil Gyeongsu-daero 976beon-gil	Suwon City	Jangan District	
Gyeongsu-daero	Soldae IS	솔대사거리	Manseok-ro	Suwon City	Jangan District	
Gyeongsu-daero	Pajangcheon IS	파장천사거리	Pajangcheon-ro	Suwon City	Jangan District	
Gyeongsu-daero	Tax Office IS	국세청삼거리		Suwon City	Jangan District	
Gyeongsu-daero	Education Center IS	교육원삼거리	Imok-ro	Suwon City	Jangan District	
Gyeongsu-daero	Gyeonggi Human Resource Development Institute	경기인재개발원		Suwon City	Jangan District	
Gyeongsu-daero	Jijidae IS	지지대 교차로	Seobu-ro	Suwon City	Jangan District	
Gyeongsu-daero	Jijidae hill	지지대고개		Suwon City	Jangan District	
Gyeongsu-daero	Jijidae hill			Uiwang City	Gocheon-dong	
Gyeongsu-daero	North Suwon IC	북수원 나들목	Yeongdong Expressway	Uiwang City	Gocheon-dong	
Gyeongsu-daero	Golsageunae IS	골사그내 교차로	Golsageunae-gil	Uiwang City	Gocheon-dong	
Gyeongsu-daero	Yakult Entrance	야쿠르트입구		Uiwang City	Gocheon-dong	
Gyeongsu-daero	Uiwang IC	의왕 나들목	Prefectural Route 309 (Gwacheon-Bongdam Urban Expressway)	Uiwang City	Gocheon-dong	
Gyeongsu-daero	Gohap IS	고합삼거리		Uiwang City	Gocheon-dong	
Gyeongsu-daero	Gocheon IS (Uiwang Gocheon Underpass)	고천사거리 (의왕고천지하차도)	Sacheon-ro; Obong-ro	Uiwang City	Gocheon-dong	
Gyeongsu-daero	Uiwang Gocheon Intercity Bus Stop	의왕고천시외버스정류장		Uiwang City	Gocheon-dong	
Gyeongsu-daero	Industrial Bank of Korea IS	기업은행사거리	Gocheongongeop-ro; Ojeoncheon-ro	Uiwang City	Gocheon-dong	
Gyeongsu-daero	Ojeon-dong IS	오전동사거리	Gosan-ro; Hyohaeng-ro	Uiwang City	Ojeon-dong	
Gyeongsu-daero	Wongol-ro IS	원골로삼거리	Wongol-ro	Uiwang City	Ojeon-dong	
Gyeongsu-daero	Morang-ro IS	모락로삼거리	Morang-ro	Uiwang City	Ojeon-dong	
Gyeongsu-daero	Podowon IS	포도원사거리	Goraedeul-gil; Podowon-ro	Anyang City	Dongan District	
Gyeongsu-daero	Hogye IS	호계삼거리	Nongsim-ro; LS-ro	Anyang City	Dongan District	
Gyeongsu-daero	Hogye IS (Hogye Underpass) (Hogye 1-dong Community Center)	호계사거리 (호계지하차도) (호계1동주민센터)	National Route 47 (Heungan-daero)	Anyang City	Dongan District	
Gyeongsu-daero	Singi IS	신기사거리	Singi-daero	Anyang City	Dongan District	Indirect connected with Pyeongchon IC
Gyeongsu-daero	Bangchuk IS	방축사거리	Gwiin-ro	Anyang City	Dongan District	
Gyeongsu-daero	Hogye-dong Intercity Bus Stop	호계동시외버스정류장		Anyang City	Dongan District	
Gyeongsu-daero	Beomgye IS (Beomgye Underpass)	범계사거리 (범계지하차도)	Simin-daero	Anyang City	Dongan District	
Gyeongsu-daero	Bisan Bridge Bisan-dong Intercity Bus Stop	비산교 비산동시외버스정류장		Anyang City	Dongan District	
Gyeongsu-daero	Bisan IS (Bisan Underpass)	비산사거리 (비산지하차도)	Prefectural Route 57 (Gwanak-daero)	Anyang City	Dongan District	
Gyeongsu-daero	Daelim University College Entrance	대림대학 입구	Imgok-ro	Anyang City	Manan District	
Gyeongsu-daero	No name	(이름 없음)	Bakdaruhoe-ro	Anyang City	Manan District	
Gyeongsu-daero	Anyang City General Welfare Center for Disabilities Persons	안양시관악장애인종합복지관		Anyang City	Manan District	
Gyeongsu-daero	Yuwonji Overpass	유원지고가차도	Yesulgongwon-ro	Anyang City	Manan District	
Gyeongsu-daero	Samsung Elementary School Sinchon Bridge Seoksu 1-dong Welfare Center Gwanak station	삼성초등학교 신촌교 석수1동행정복지센터 관악역		Anyang City	Manan District	
Gyeongsu-daero	Sammak IS	삼막삼거리	Sammak-ro	Anyang City	Manan District	
Gyeongsu-daero	Seoksu IC	석수 나들목	Second Gyeongin Expressway	Anyang City	Manan District	
Gyeongsu-daero	Anyang Overpass IS	안양육교삼거리	Anyang-ro	Anyang City	Manan District	
Gyeongsu-daero	Seoksu station	석수역		Anyang City	Manan District	Continuation into Seoul

- Road names:
  - Anseong Bridge - Daeseong Bridge section: Gyeonggi-daero
  - Air Base IS - Seoksu station section: Gyeongsu-daero

=== Seoul ===
Name	Hangul name	Connection	Location		Note
Front of Seoksu station	석수역 앞		Seoul	Geumcheon District	Gyeonggi Province - Seoul border line
Front of Kia Bridge IS	기아대교앞 교차로	Kia-ro	Seoul	Geumcheon District	
Geumcheon Ramp	금천 램프	Gangnam Beltway	Seoul	Geumcheon District	
Siheung Industrial Yongjae Distribution Center Geumcheon Culture Center	시흥산업용재유통센터 금천문화원		Seoul	Geumcheon District	
Bakmi IS	박미삼거리	Doksan-ro	Seoul	Geumcheon District	
Home plus Siheung Store	홈플러스 시흥점		Seoul	Geumcheon District	
Siheung IS	시흥사거리	Siheung-daero; Geumha-ro	Seoul	Geumcheon District	
Siheung Bridge	시흥대교		Seoul	Geumcheon District	
Siheung Bridge IS	시흥대교 교차로	Geumha-ro	Seoul	Geumcheon District	
Anyang stream Bridge	안양천교		Seoul	Geumcheon District	
Geumcheon IC	금천 나들목	Seohaean Expressway	Seoul	Geumcheon District	
Geumcheon Bridge IS	금천교 교차로	Beoman-ro	Seoul	Geumcheon District	
Geumcheon IS	금천 교차로	Seobusaet-gil	Seoul	Geumcheon District	
Cheolsan Bridge IS	철산교 교차로	Digital-ro	Seoul	Geumcheon District	
Gwangmyeong Bridge IS	광명교 교차로	Gamasan-ro	Seoul	Geumcheon District	
Guil Elementary School IS	구일초교앞 교차로	Guil-ro	Seoul	Guro District	
Anyang Railway Bridge	안양천철교		Seoul	Guro District	
Gocheok Bridge IS	고척교 교차로	National Route 46 (Gyeongin-ro)	Seoul	Guro District	
Ogeum Bridge IS	오금교 교차로	Gurojungang-ro; Mokdong-ro	Seoul	Guro District	
Sinjeong Bridge IS	신정교 교차로	Dorimcheon-ro	Seoul	Yeongdeungpo District	
Omok Bridge IS	오목교 교차로	Yeongdeungpo-ro; Omok-ro	Seoul	Yeongdeungpo District	
Mokdong Bridge IS	목동교 교차로	Gukhoe-daero	Seoul	Yeongdeungpo District	Sinwol IC (indirect connected with Gyeongin Expressway)
Yangmyeong Bridge IS	양평교 교차로	Yangpyeong-ro	Seoul	Yeongdeungpo District	
Seongsan Bridge (south side) IS	성산대교남단 교차로	National Route 6 National Route 48; National Route 77 (Nodeul-ro)	Seoul	Yeongdeungpo District	National Route 48 overlap
Seongsan Bridge	성산대교		Seoul	Yeongdeungpo District	National Route 48 overlap
Seongsan Bridge			Seoul	Mapo District	National Route 48 overlap
Seongsan Bridge (north side) IS	성산대교북단 교차로	National Route 77 (Gangbyeonbuk-ro)	Seoul	Mapo District	National Route 48 overlap
Inner Expressway Entrance	내부순환로입구	National Route 48 (Seongsan-ro); Naebu Expressway	Seoul	Mapo District	National Route 48 overlap
Seoul World Cup Stadium IS	월드컵경기장삼거리	World Cup-ro	Seoul	Mapo District	
World Cup Stadium IS	월드컵경기장 교차로	World Cup-ro; Jeungsan-ro	Seoul	Mapo District	
World Cup Tunnel	월드컵터널		Seoul	Mapo District	Approximately 300m
Sangam IS	상암사거리	World Cup buk-ro	Seoul	Mapo District	
Jeungdong Bridge IS (Jeungsan Underpass)	중동교 교차로 (증산지하차도)	Seongam-ro	Seoul	Mapo District	
Jeungsan 3 Bridge IS	증산3교 교차로	Geobukgol-ro; Jeungsan-ro 3-gil	Seoul	Eunpyeong District	
Jeungsan station IS	증산역 교차로	Jeungga-ro; Jeungsan-ro 9-gil	Seoul	Eunpyeong District	
Wasan Bridge IS	와산교 교차로	Yongam-ro 13-gil Jeungsan-ro 15-gil	Seoul	Eunpyeong District	
Saejeol station IS	새절역 교차로	Gajwa-ro	Seoul	Eunpyeong District	
Sinsa IS (Eungam station)	신사오거리 (응암역)	Eunpyeong-ro; Jinheung-ro	Seoul	Eunpyeong District	
Yeokchon-dong Welfare Center	역촌동행정복지센터		Seoul	Eunpyeong District	
Yeongmal IS	역말사거리	Yeongmal-ro	Seoul	Eunpyeong District	
Yale Design High School Yale Elementary School Yale Girls' High School Yale Girls' Middle School	예일디자인고등학교 예일초등학교 예일여자고등학교 예일여자중학교		Seoul	Eunpyeong District	
Gusan station IS	구산역 교차로	Seooreung-ro	Seoul	Eunpyeong District	
Yeonsinnae station IS	연신내역 교차로	Tongil-ro; Yeonseo-ro	Seoul	Eunpyeong District	
Eunpyeong Fire Station Sindo High School	은평소방서 신도고등학교		Seoul	Eunpyeong District	
Bakseok hill Pass IS	박석고개 교차로	Jingwan 1-ro	Seoul	Eunpyeong District	
Gupabal IS	구파발사거리	Jingwan 3-ro	Seoul	Eunpyeong District	Continuation into Gyeonggi Province

=== Gyeonggi Province (North of Seoul) ===
Name	Hangul name	Connection	Location		Note
Dongsan IS (Dongsan Overpass)	동산삼거리 (동산육교)	Goyang-daero	Goyang City	Deogyang District	Seoul - Gyeonggi Province border line
Hyoja 2 Bridge	효자2교		Goyang City	Deogyang District	
Jichuk Train Depot (Seoul Subway Line 3)	지축차량기지앞	Prefectural Route 356 (Samsong-ro)	Goyang City	Deogyang District	
Public Housing Samsong Elementary School Samsong Housing Sutdol hill Pass	공무원주택앞 삼송초등학교앞 삼송주택앞 숫돌고개		Goyang City	Deogyang District	
(Sinwon Underpass)	(신원지하차도)	Gwonyul-daero	Goyang City	Deogyang District	
Sinwon Elementary School Byeokje Bridge	신원초등학교앞 벽제교		Goyang City	Deogyang District	
Tongil-ro IC	통일로 나들목	Seoul Ring Expressway	Goyang City	Deogyang District	
Daeja IS	대자삼거리	National Route 39; Prefectural Route 78 (Hoguk-ro)	Goyang City	Deogyang District	
Philippine Forces in the Korea War Monument	필리핀참전비앞	Daeyang-ro	Goyang City	Deogyang District	
Gwansan-dong Community Center Goyang Foreign Language High School Goyang Jeil Middle School	관산동주민센터 고양외국어고등학교 고양제일중학교		Goyang City	Deogyang District	
Gwansan IS	관산삼거리	Songhyeon-ro	Goyang City	Deogyang District	
Dupo-dong Entrance	두포동입구		Goyang City	Deogyang District	
Gajang-dong IS	가장동삼거리	Dongheon-ro	Goyang City	Deogyang District	
Gogol Entrance IS	고골입구삼거리	Gogol-gil	Goyang City	Deogyang District	
Naeu Elementary School	내유초등학교		Goyang City	Deogyang District	
Janggok Checkpoint IS	장곡검문소 교차로	Prefectural Route 98 (Myeongbongsan-ro)	Goyang City	Deogyang District	
Nonghyup Hanaro Paju Store	농협하나로클럽 파주점		Paju City	Jori-eup	
Bongilcheon Entrance IS	봉일천입구 교차로	Bongcheon-ro; Sogok-ro	Paju City	Jori-eup	
No name	(이름 없음)	Gobong-ro; Durubong-ro	Paju City	Jori-eup	
Bongilcheon IS	봉일천사거리	Daewon-ro; Jungang-ro	Paju City	Jori-eup	
Deungwon IS	등원 교차로	Prefectural Route 56 (Paju-ro)	Paju City	Jori-eup	
Front PX town IS	PX마을앞 교차로	Hangnyeong-ro	Paju City	Geumchon-dong	
Geumchonsin IS	금촌신사거리	Saekkot-ro	Paju City	Wollong-myeon	
Yeongtae IS	영태삼거리	Hantaemal-gil	Paju City	Wollong-myeon	
Wollong IS	월롱삼거리	Prefectural Route 360 (Hyuam-ro)	Paju City	Wollong-myeon	Prefectural Route 360 overlap
Wollong station	월롱역		Paju City	Wollong-myeon	Prefectural Route 360 overlap
Wollong IS	월롱 교차로	Dogam-ro; LG-ro	Paju City	Wollong-myeon	Prefectural Route 360 overlap
Wollong Bridge	월롱교		Paju City	Wollong-myeon	Prefectural Route 360 overlap
Wollong Bridge			Paju City	Paju-eup	Prefectural Route 360 overlap
No name	(이름 없음)	Prefectural Route 360 (Gwangtancheon-ro)	Paju City	Paju-eup	Prefectural Route 360 overlap
Yeonpung Overpass	연풍육교		Paju City	Paju-eup	
Jurawi IS	주라위삼거리	Surihol-ro	Paju City	Paju-eup	
Front of unity Park	통일공원앞	Munsannyeok-ro; Chunghyeon-ro	Paju City	Paju-eup	
Munsan Bridge	문산교		Paju City	Paju-eup	
Munsan Bridge			Paju City	Munsan-eup	
Munsan-eup Welfare Center	문산읍행정복지센터		Paju City	Munsan-eup	
Munsan IS	문산사거리	Prefectural Route 364 (Ugye-ro)	Paju City	Munsan-eup	
No name	(이름 없음)	Bangchon-ro	Paju City	Munsan-eup	
Yeou hill IS	여우고개사거리	National Route 37 (Yulgok-ro)	Paju City	Munsan-eup	
Uncheon station	운천역		Paju City	Munsan-eup	
Majeong-ri Entrance IS	마정리입구 교차로	Majeong-ro	Paju City	Munsan-eup	
Majeong IS	마정 교차로	Imjingak-ro	Paju City	Munsan-eup	
Jayu IC	자유 나들목	National Route 77 (Jayu-ro)	Paju City	Munsan-eup	
Tongil Bridge	통일대교		Paju City	Munsan-eup	
Tongil Bridge			Paju City	Gunnae-myeon	Civilian Control Zone (CCZ)
Tongilchon IS	통일촌사거리	Tongilchon-gil	Paju City	Gunnae-myeon	Civilian Control Zone (CCZ)
Gunnae IS	군내삼거리	Huimang-ro	Paju City	Gunnae-myeon	Civilian Control Zone (CCZ)
Jeomwon-ri	점원리		Paju City	Gunnae-myeon	Civilian Control Zone (CCZ)
Geumneung-ri	금릉리		Paju City	Jinseo-myeon	Civilian Control Zone (CCZ)
Eoryong-ri	어룡리	Daeseongdong-gil	Paju City	Jinseo-myeon	Civilian Control Zone (CCZ)
Panmunjeom	판문점		Paju City	Jinseo-myeon	Civilian Control Zone (CCZ)
Continuation into North Korea

== Media ==
- Road No. 1 (2010 South Korean television series)

== See also ==
- National Route 1
- Seobu Ganseon Doro (Part of National Route 1)
- Tongil-ro (Part of National Route 1)
