= Sohung station =

Railway station in North Korea

Coordinates: 38.4197°N 126.2302°E

Sŏhŭng 서흥

Korean name
- Hangul: 서흥역
- Hanja: 西興驛
- Revised Romanization: Seoheung-yeok
- McCune–Reischauer: Sŏhŭng-yŏk

General information
- Location: Sŏhŭng-ŭp, Sŏhŭng, North Hwanghae; North Korea
- Owner: Korean State Railway

History
- Opened: 3 April 1906

Services
Preceding station	Korean State Railway	Following station
Sokhyon towards P'yŏngyang	P'yŏngbu Line	Mulgae towards Kaesŏng
Location

Sŏhŭng station is a railway station located in Sŏhŭng-ŭp, Sŏhŭng Country, North Hwanghae province, North Korea. It is on located on the P'yŏngbu Line, which was formed from part of the Kyŏngŭi Line to accommodate the shift of the capital from Seoul to P'yŏngyang; though this line physically connects P'yŏngyang to Pusan via Dorasan, in operational reality it ends at Kaesŏng due to the Korean Demilitarized Zone.
