= Sokhyon station =

Railway station in North Korea

Coordinates: 38°25′32″N 126°10′22″E

Sokhyon 석현

Korean name
- Hangul: 석현역
- Hanja: 石峴驛
- Revised Romanization: Seokhyeon-yeok
- McCune–Reischauer: Sŏkhyŏn-yŏk

General information
- Location: Pongha-ri, Sŏhŭng Country, North Hwanghae Province; North Korea
- Owner: Korean State Railway

History
- Opened: 3 April 1906

Services
Preceding station	Korean State Railway	Following station
Munmu towards P'yŏngyang	P'yŏngbu Line	Sŏhŭng towards Kaesŏng
Location

Sokhyon station is a railway station located in Sinmak-ri, Sŏhŭng Country, North Hwanghae province, North Korea. It is on located on the P'yŏngbu Line, which was formed from part of the Kyŏngŭi Line to accommodate the shift of the capital from Seoul to P'yŏngyang; though this line physically connects P'yŏngyang to Pusan via Dorasan, in operational reality it ends at Kaesŏng due to the Korean Demilitarized Zone.

One kilometre north of the station is Sinmak Airfield, which served during the Korean War.
