= Chonggye station =

Railway station in North Korea

Coordinates: 38°27′47″N 125°56′19″E

Ch'ŏnggye 청계역

Korean name
- Hangul: 청계역
- Hanja: 清溪驛
- Revised Romanization: Cheonggye-yeok
- McCune–Reischauer: Ch'ŏnggye-yŏk

General information
- Location: Pongsan County, North Hwanghae Province; North Korea
- Owner: Korean State Railway

History
- Opened: 1906

Services
Preceding station	Korean State Railway	Following station
Pongsan towards P'yŏngyang	P'yŏngbu Line	Hŭngsu towards Kaesŏng
Location

Ch'ŏnggye station is a railway station located in Pongsan County, North Hwanghae province, North Korea. It is on located on the P'yŏngbu Line, which was formed from part of the Kyŏngŭi Line to accommodate the shift of the capital from Seoul to P'yŏngyang; though this line physically connects P'yŏngyang to Pusan via Dorasan, in operational reality it ends at Kaesŏng due to the Korean Demilitarized Zone.
