= 2sunhwan-ro =

2sunhwan-ro (Korean: 2순환로), Loop 2 or 2nd Sunhwan-ro (Korean: 제2순환로) is the roads in South Korea.

- 2sunhwan-ro (Gwangju)
- 2sunhwan-ro (Cheongju)
