= Sobongsan station =

Railway station in North Korea

West Pongsan 서봉산

Korean name
- Hangul: 서봉산역
- Hanja: 西鳳山駅
- Revised Romanization: Seobongsan-yeok
- McCune–Reischauer: Sŏbongsan-yŏk

General information
- Location: Pongsan-ŭp, Pongsan-gun; North Hwanghae; North Korea
- Owner: Korean State Railway
- Operator: Korean State Railway
- Tracks: 7
- Connections: None

Services
Preceding station	Korean State Railway	Following station
Terminus	Pongsan Line	Pongsan Terminus
Location

Sŏbongsan station (West Pongsan station) is a railway station located in Pongsan-ŭp, Pongsan County, North Hwanghae Province, North Korea. It is the terminus of the Pongsan Line of the Korean State Railway. It is a freight-only station serving the February 8 Cement Complex, one of the largest cement factories in the DPRK.
