= Pongsan station =

Railway station in North Korea

Pongsan 봉산

Korean name
- Hangul: 봉산역
- Hanja: 鳳山驛
- Revised Romanization: Bongsan-nyeok
- McCune–Reischauer: Pongsan-nyŏk

General information
- Location: Pongsan-ŭp, Pongsan-gun; North Hwanghae; North Korea
- Coordinates: 38°28′04″N 125°51′42″E
- Owner: Korean State Railway
- Operator: Korean State Railway
- Platforms: 4 (2 island platforms)
- Tracks: 6
- Connections: None

History
- Opened: 1906
- Former names: Madong
- Original company: Chosen Government Railway

Services
Preceding station	Korean State Railway	Following station
East Sariwŏn towards P'yŏngyang	P'yŏngbu Line	Ch'ŏnggye towards Kaesŏng
West Pongsan Terminus	Pongsan Line	Terminus
Location

Pongsan station is a railway station located in Pongsan-ŭp, Pongsan County, North Hwanghae Province, North Korea. It is on located on the P'yŏngbu Line, and it is the starting point of the Pongsan Line.

== History ==
Pongsan station was originally opened by the Chosen Government Railway in 1906 as Madong station; the name was changed after the establishment of the DPRK.
