= Hungsu station =

Railway station in Hŭngsu-ri, North Korea

Coordinates: 38.4345°N 126.0669°E

Hŭngsu 흥수

Korean name
- Hangul: 흥수역
- Hanja: 興水驛
- Revised Romanization: Heungsu-yeok
- McCune–Reischauer: Hŭngsu-yŏk

General information
- Location: Hŭngsu-ri, Pongsan County, North Hwanghae Province; North Korea
- Owner: Korean State Railway

History
- Opened: 1906

Services
Preceding station	Korean State Railway	Following station
Ch'ŏnggye towards P'yŏngyang	P'yŏngbu Line	Munmu towards Kaesŏng
Location

Hŭngsu station is a railway station located in Hŭngsu-ri, Pongsan County, North Hwanghae province, North Korea. It is on located on the P'yŏngbu Line, which was formed from part of the Kyŏngŭi Line to accommodate the shift of the capital from Seoul to P'yŏngyang; though this line physically connects P'yŏngyang to Pusan via Dorasan, in operational reality it ends at Kaesŏng due to the Korean Demilitarized Zone.
