= Sendai-ro Road =

Sendai-ro Road (Hangul: 센다이로, Hanja or Japanese: 仙臺路) indicates these roads.

- Sendai-ro Road (Seo-gu, Gwangju) : It is near Guus Hiddink Stadium.
- Sendai-ro Road (Urban Expressway) : Bitgoeul-ro Road in Gwangju, Korea.
