= Pongsan Line =

Railway line in North Korea

Overview
- Native name: 봉산선 (鳳山線)
- Status: Operational
- Owner: Korean State Railway
- Locale: Pongsan-gun; North Hwanghae
- Termini: Pongsan; West Pongsan
- Stations: 2

Service
- Type: Heavy rail, Freight rail
- Operator(s): Korean State Railway

Technical
- Line length: 2.5 km (1.6 mi)
- Number of tracks: Single track
- Track gauge: 1,435 mm (4 ft 8 1/2 in) standard gauge

- Pongsan Line
- Hangul: 봉산선
- Hanja: 鳳山線
- RR: Bongsanseon
- MR: Pongsansŏn

The Pongsan Line is an electrified freight-only railway line of the Korean State Railway in Pongsan County, North Hwanghae Province, North Korea, running from Pongsan on the P'yŏngbu Line to West Pongsan,

== Services ==
The February 8 Cement Complex, one of the largest cement factories in North Korea, is located at West Pongsan. Much of the outbound traffic is cement destined for Kangdong on the P'yŏngdŏk Line, and for export via Haeju Port on the Hwanghae Ch'ŏngnyŏn Line.

== Route ==
A yellow background in the "Distance" box indicates that section of the line is not electrified.

Distance (km)		Station Name		Former Name		
Total	S2S	Transcribed	Chosŏn'gŭl (Hanja)	Transcribed	Chosŏn'gŭl (Hanja)	Connections
0.0	0.0	Pongsan	봉산 (鳳山)	Madong	마동 (馬洞)	P'yŏngbu Line
2.5	2.5	West Pongsan (Sŏbongsan)	서봉산 (西鳳山)			
