= Munmu station =

Railway station in North Korea

Coordinates: 38.4197°N 126.2302°E

Munmu 문무

Korean name
- Hangul: 문무역
- Hanja: 文武驛
- Revised Romanization: Munmu-yeok
- McCune–Reischauer: Munmu-yŏk

General information
- Location: Munmu-ri, Sŏhŭng County, North Hwanghae Province; North Korea
- Owner: Korean State Railway

History
- Opened: 1 December 1939
- Former names: Munmuri
- Original company: Chosen Government Railway

Services
Preceding station	Korean State Railway	Following station
Hŭngsu towards P'yŏngyang	P'yŏngbu Line	Sokhyon towards Kaesŏng
Location

Munmu station is a railway station located in Munmu-ri, Sŏhŭng County, North Hwanghae province, North Korea. It is on located on the P'yŏngbu Line, which was formed from part of the Kyŏngŭi Line to accommodate the shift of the capital from Seoul to P'yŏngyang; though this line physically connects P'yŏngyang to Pusan via Dorasan, in operational reality it ends at Kaesŏng due to the Korean Demilitarized Zone.

== History ==
The station, originally called Munmuri station, was opened by the Chosen Government Railway on 1 December 1939.
