= Tongsariwon station =

Railway station in North Korea

East Sariwŏn 동사리원

Korean name
- Hangul: 동사리원역
- Hanja: 東沙里院驛
- Revised Romanization: Dongsariwon-yeok
- McCune–Reischauer: Tongsariwŏn-yŏk

General information
- Location: Sariwŏn-si; North Hwanghae Province; North Korea
- Coordinates: 38°36′37″N 125°43′35″E
- Owner: Korean State Railway

History
- Opened: 1 December 1926
- Former names: Sinbongsan
- Original company: Chosen Government Railway

Services
Preceding station	Korean State Railway	Following station
Sariwŏn Ch'ŏngnyŏn towards P'yŏngyang	P'yŏngbu Line	Pongsan towards Kaesŏng
Location

East Sariwŏn station (or Tongsariwŏn station) is a railway station located in Sariwŏn, North Hwanghae province, North Korea. It is on located on the P'yŏngbu Line, which was formed from part of the Kyŏngŭi Line to accommodate the shift of the capital from Seoul to P'yŏngyang; though this line physically connects P'yŏngyang to Pusan via Dorasan, in operational reality it ends at Kaesŏng due to the Korean Demilitarized Zone.

Originally called Sinbongsan station, the station was opened by the Chosen Government Railway on 1 December 1926.
