= Bitgoeul-daero =

Road in Gwangju, South Korea

- Hangul: 빛고을대로
- Hanja: 빛고을大路
- RR: Bitgoeul-daero
- MR: Pitkoŭl-daero

The Bitgoeul-daero (Korean: 빛고을대로) is an urban expressway in Gwangju, Korea. The highway connects from Yuchon-dong, Seo-gu, Gwangju to Dongnim-dong, Buk-gu: about 4 km(2.5 miles.)

It opened on December 29, 2004, and the name was Sendai-ro Road(Korean: 센다이로, Japanese: 仙台路), to celebrate forming a sister city between Gwangju, Korea and Sendai, Japan. However people aroused the road name of this road should be changed because it's not fit naming Japanese style on the gateway of Gwangju. So Gwangju changed a road name: Bitgoeul (literally "village of light") in April, 2005. Now Sendai-ro Road is located in near Guus Hiddink Stadium, about 1.8 km(1.1 miles).

== Interchange and Junction ==
- Gyesu Junction (Korean: 계수교차로)
- Wooseok-gyo IC (Korean: 우석교 나들목)
- Dongbae-gyo IC (Korean: 동배교 나들목)
- Bukmun IC (Korean: 북문 나들목)
- Dongnim IC (Korean: 동림 나들목)

== See also ==
- Gwangju 2nd Loop (2순환로)
- Honam Expressway
- Mujin-ro (무진로)
