= Yale Design High School =

Coordinates: 37.6094°N 126.9159°E

Yale Design High School 예일디자인고등학교
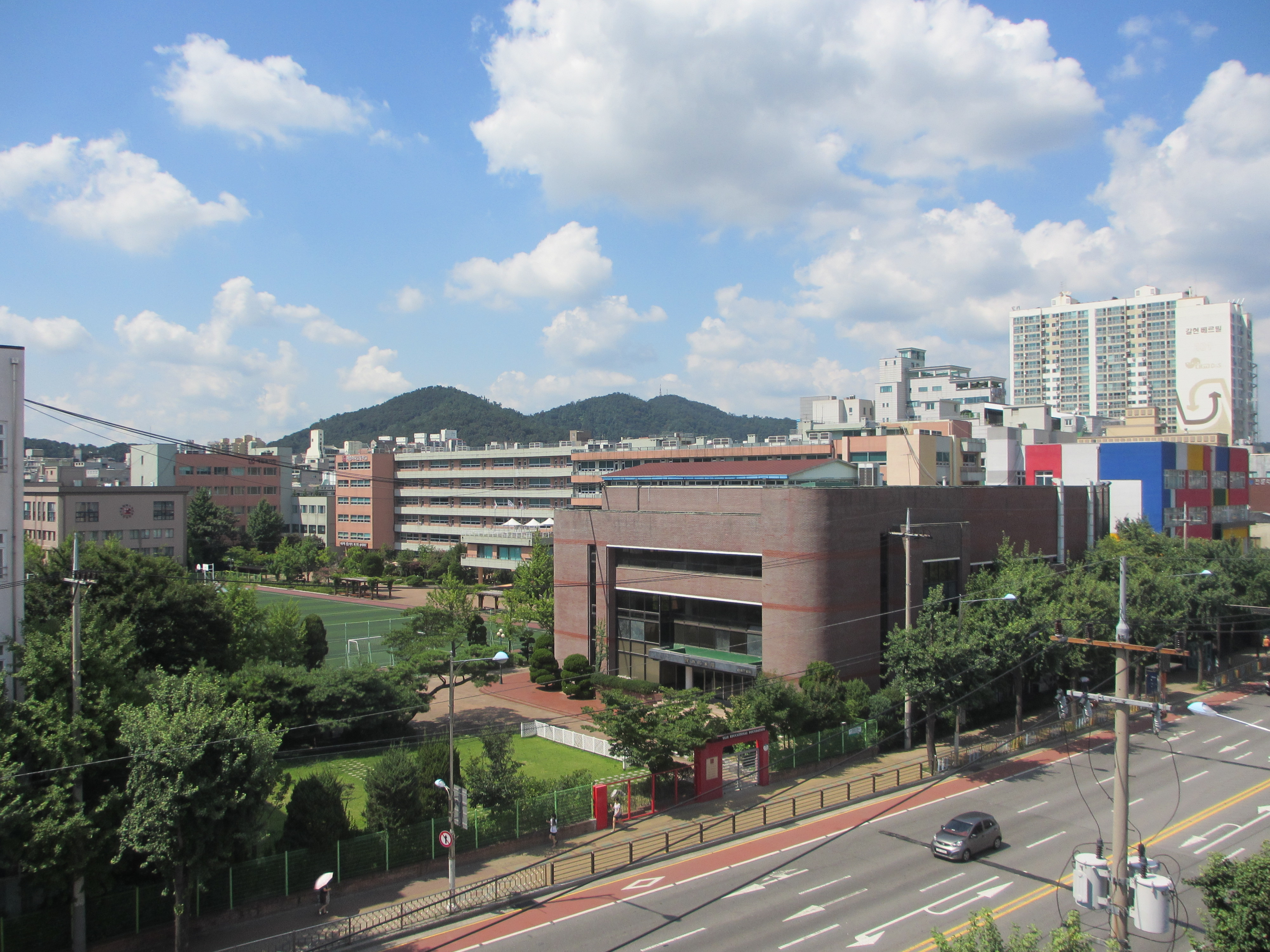
- Yale Kindergarten, Yale Elementary School, Yale Girls' Middle School, Yale Girls' High School, and Yale Design High School in Gusan-dong, Eunpyeong-gu, Seoul, South Korea.
- 117 Yeonseo-ro, Eunpyeong-gu, Seoul; South Korea

Information
- Type: Private
- Established: 1965; 60 years ago
- Founder: Kim Ye-hwan (김예환)
- Principal: Jo Jae-seong (조재성)
- Deputy Principal: Park Heung-seok (박흥석)
- Faculty: 53
- Gender: Girls
- Website: yale-dh.hs.kr

Yale Design High School (Korean: 예일디자인고등학교) is a private girls high school located in Gusan-dong, Eunpyeong-gu, Seoul.

== Departments ==
=== Visual Design ===
Compulsory subjects

- General design
- Colour management
- Human development
- Commercial economy
- Basic computer skills

=== Web Design ===
Compulsory subjects

- Commercial economy
- Human development
- Basic computer skills

=== Fashion Design ===
Compulsory subjects

- General design
- Computer graphic
- Drawing
- Portfolio

=== Interior Design ===
Compulsory subjects

- General design
- Computer graphic
- Drawing

== Principals ==
List of principals of Yale Design High School:

- 1st: Kim Ye-hwan (1965–2000)
- 2nd: Kim Young-woo (2000–2001)
- 3rd: Kwon Young-mun (2001–2004)
- 4th: Han Cheol-soo (2004–2007.03.02)
- 5th: Kim Ye-hwan (2007.03.02—2013.03.01)
- 6th: Jo Jae-seong (2013.03.01—present)
