= Goyang Foreign Language High School =

Coordinates: 37°41′25″N 126°51′38″E

- Korean: 고양외국어고등학교 Japanese: 高陽外国語高等学校; Chinese: 高阳外国语高中 French: Goyang l'école secondaire de langues étrangères
- South Korea

Information
- Type: Private
- Motto: "믿음, 소망, 사랑 (Faith, Hope, Love)"
- Established: March 2002
- Enrollment: c. 1200
- Language: Korean, English

The Goyang Foreign Language High School is a secondary school in Gyeonggi Province, Gwansan-dong, South Korea. It opened in March 2002.

Goyang School focuses on preparing students for study abroad, and emphasizes language study in English, Chinese, Japanese, and Spanish. All students major in one offered language. The school also provides international study opportunities to prepare for exams such as the SAT, AP, and the TOEFL.

== Extracurricular Activities ==
Goyang School offers several extracurricular activities, including:

- Model United Nations (GYMUN)
- Newspaper Goyang (NG)
- Goyang Herald (English-language student paper)
- Physics in Daily Life (생활속의 물리부)
- Goyang Debate Society (GDS) (English-language)
- Math Club (BTM)
