= 2sunhwan-ro (Gwangju) =

Road in Gwangju, South Korea

2sunhwan-ro
- Gwangju Loop 2; 2순환로
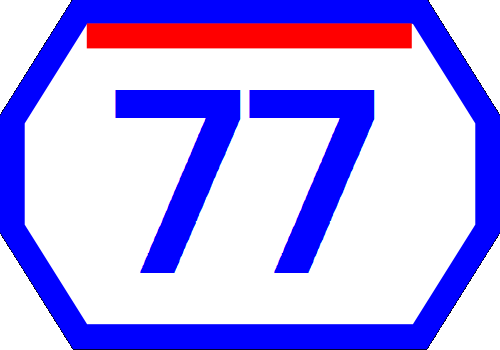

Route information
- Length: 27.66 km (17.19 mi)
- Existed: 1995–present

Major junctions
- East end: Dong-gu, Gwangju(Munheung Junction); Honam Expressway
- National Route 29; National Route 22; National Route 1 Gangjin-Gwangju Expressway(2021); Muan-Gwangju Expressway
- West end: Gwangsan, Gwangju(Sanwol Junction); Honam Expressway

Location
- Country: South Korea

Highway system
- Highway systems of South Korea; Expressways; National; Local

- 2sunhwan-ro
- Hangul: 2순환로
- Hanja: 2循環路
- Literal meaning: 2nd Loop Road
- Revised Romanization: 2 Sunhwanro
- McCune–Reischauer: 2 Sunhwanro

The 2sunhwan-ro (Korean: 2순환로), also called Gwangju Loop 2, is a 6-lane highway located in Gwangju, Republic of Korea. this route circulates suburbs with Dountown of Gwangju, with a total length of 27.66 km (17.19 mi).

== History ==
- 1 October 1992 : Under construction.
- January 1995 : East Gwangju ~ Gakhwa section opens to traffic.
- 15 January 1995 : Jiwon ~ Hyodeok section opens to traffic.
- 1 May 1998 : Gakhwa ~ Duam section opens to traffic.
- 1 January 2001 : Duam ~ Jiwon section opens to traffic.
- 5 March 2002 : Pungam ~ Seochang section opens to traffic.
- 15 October 2004 : Pungam ~ Hyodeok section opens to traffic.
- 15 May 2007 : Sanwol JCT ~ Seochang section opens to traffic.
- 19 September 2009 : Munheung JCT ~ Gakhwa section opens to traffic.

== List of facilities ==
- IC: Interchange, JC: Junction, SA: Service Area, TG: Tollgate

| Sections | No. | Name | Hangul name | Hanja name | Connections | Location | | Notes |
|---|---|---|---|---|---|---|---|---|
| 1 | JC | Munheung JC | 문흥 분기점 | 文興 | Gwangju-Daegu Expressway; Honam Expressway | Gwangju | Buk District | |
| 1 | IC | Munheung | 문흥 | 文興 | Dodong-ro | Gwangju | Buk District | Munheung-bound Only |
| 1 | IC | Gakhwa | 각화 | 角化 | Gakhwa-daero (Honam Expressway) | Gwangju | Buk District | |
| 1 | IC | Duam | 두암 | 斗巖 | Mudeung-ro | Gwangju | Buk District | |
| 1 | IC | Hagun | 학운 | 鶴雲 | Uijae-ro | Gwangju | Dong District | |
| 1 | TG | Sotae | 소태 요금소 | 所台 | | Gwangju | Dong District | |
| 2 | IC | Jiwon | 지원 | 池元 | National Route 22 (Nammun-ro); National Route 29 (Nammun-ro); Prefectural Route 55 (Nammun-ro) | Gwangju | Dong District | |
| 2 | IC | Yongsan | 용산 | 龍山 | Yongdae-ro | Gwangju | Dong District | |
| 2 | IC | Jinwol | 진월 | 眞月 | | Gwangju | Nam District | |
| 3 | IC | Hyodeok | 효덕 | 孝德 | National Route 1 (Seomun-daero); Prefectural Route 60 (Seomun-daero) | Gwangju | Nam District | |
| 3 | TG | Songam | 송암 요금소 | 松岩 | | Gwangju | Nam District | |
| 3 | IC | Pungam | 풍암지구 | 花亭地區 | Songam-ro; Pungseojwa-ro | Gwangju | Seo District | |
| 3 | IC | Seogwangju Station | 서광주역 | 西光州驛 | | Gwangju | Seo District | |
| 4 | IC | Seochang | 서창 | 西倉 | National Route 22 (Sangmu-daero) | Gwangju | Seo District | |
| 4 | IC | Yudeok | 유덕 | 柳德 | Mujin-daero (Muan-Gwangju Expressway) | Gwangju | Seo District | |
| 4 | TG | Yudeok | 유덕 요금소 | 柳德 | | Gwangju | Seo District | |
| 4 | IC | Singa | 신가 | 新佳 | Hanam-daero | Gwangju | Gwangsan District | |
| 4 | IC | Sinchang | 신창 | 新昌 | Jangsin-ro | Gwangju | Gwangsan District | |
| 4 | JC | Sanwol | 산월 나들목 | 山月 | Honam Expressway; National Route 1 (Bukmun-daero) | Gwangju | Gwangsan District | |

== See also ==
- Gwangju
- Mujin-daero
- Bitgoeul-daero
- 1sunhwan-ro (Gwangju)
- 2sunhwan-ro (Cheongju) - same name.
- 3sunhwan-ro (Cheongju) - same function in Cheongju.
- 4sunhwan-ro (Daegu) - same function in Daegu. Connected with Daegu Ring Expressway.
