= Sohung County =

Coordinates: 38°25′35″N 126°10′05″E

Sŏhŭng County 서흥군
- County

Korean transcription(s)
  - Hanja: 瑞興郡
  - McCune-Reischauer: Sŏhŭng-gun
  - Revised Romanization: Seoheung-gun
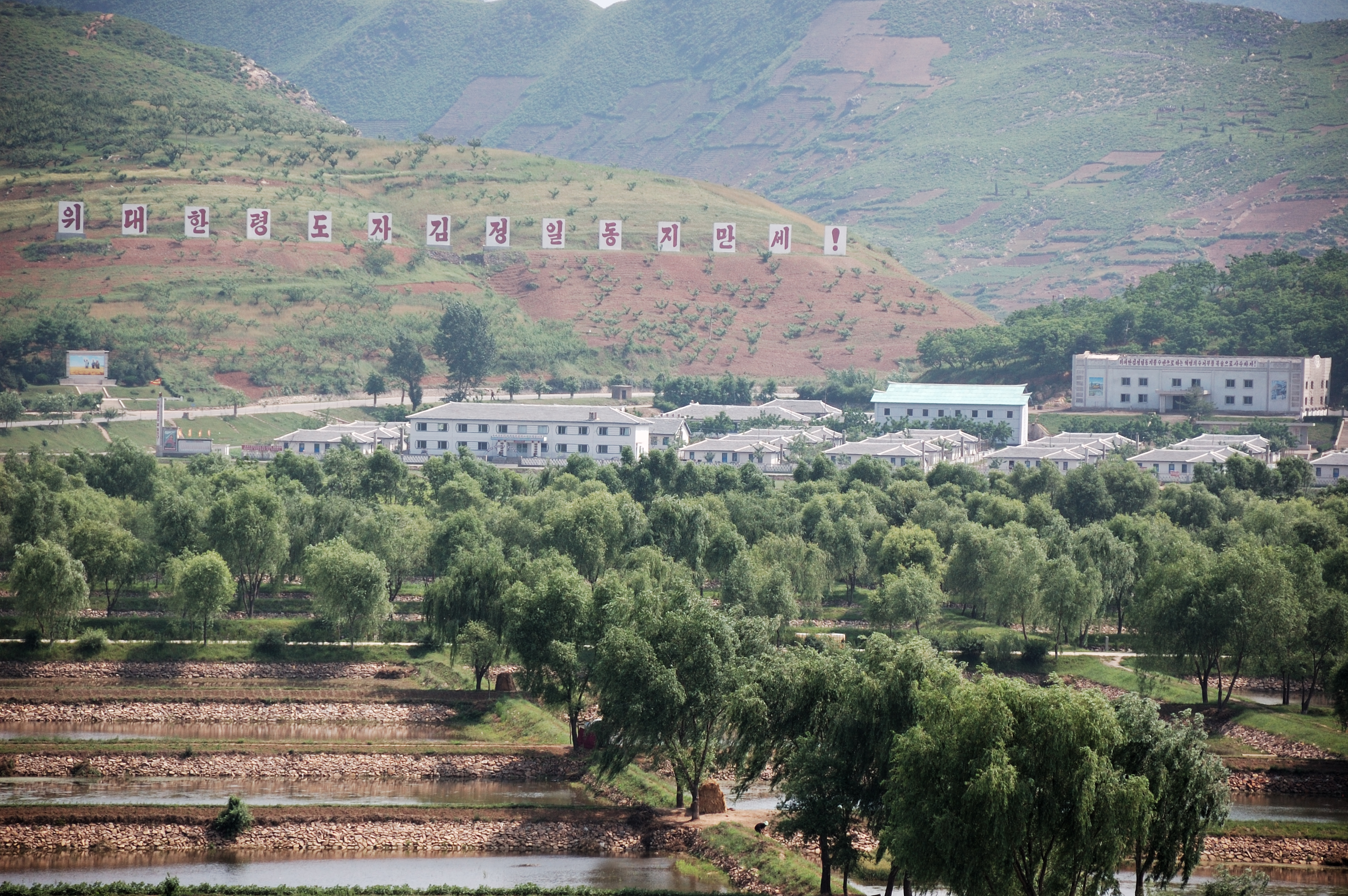
- Poman-ri Fish Farm, Sohung County

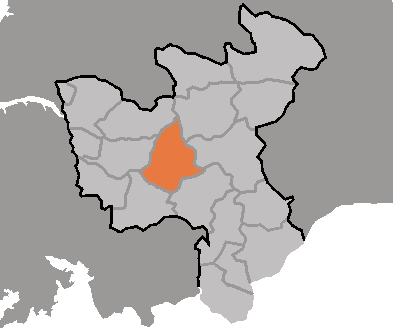
- Map of North Hwanghae showing the location of Sohung
- Country: North Korea
- Province: North Hwanghae Province

Area
  - Total: 566.14 km^{2} (218.59 sq mi)

Population (2008)
  - Total: 100,887

Sŏhŭng County is a county in North Hwanghae province, North Korea.

== History ==
In 1952, during the Korean War, the North Koreans established a military training school in Sohung County called the Kumgang Political Institute with approximately 1,500 cadets. It was headed by South Korean Kim Ung-bin.

== Administrative divisions ==
Sŏhŭng county is divided into 1 ŭp (town) and 20 ri (villages):

- Sŏhŭng-ŭp
- Chajang-ri
- Ch'ŏngp'o-ri
- Hwabong-ri
- Hwagong-ri
- Kach'ang-ri
- Kŏmul-li
- Kosŏng-ri
- Kŭmsŭng-ri
- Munmu-ri
- Namhal-li
- Paekyang-ri
- Pŏmal-li
- Pongha-ri
- Rakchol-li
- Sindang-ri
- Songwŏl-li
- Taep'yŏng-ri
- Unch'ŏl-li
- Yangam-ri
- Yangsa-ri

As of 2015, Sohung county had a population of around 100,000 people, with approximately 30,000 of these living in Sohung town.

== Transportation ==
Sŏhŭng county is served by the P'yŏngbu line of the Korean State Railway.
