= Pongsan County =

Pongsan County 봉산군
- County

Korean transcription(s)
  - Hanja: 鳳山郡
  - McCune-Reischauer: Pongsan-kun
  - Revised Romanization: Bongsan-gun
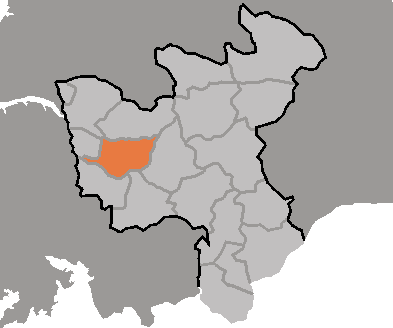
- Country: North Korea
- Province: North Hwanghae Province

Area
  - Total: 424.6 km^{2} (163.9 sq mi)

Population (2008)
  - Total: 124,745
  - Density: 293.8/km^{2} (760.9/sq mi)

Pongsan County is a county in North Hwanghae province, North Korea.

== Administrative divisions ==
Pongsan county is divided into 1 ŭp (town), 1 rodongjagu (workers' district) and 18 ri (villages):

- Pongsan-ŭp
- Songjŏng-rodongjagu
- Chit'am-ri
- Ch'ŏndŏng-ri
- Ch'ŏnggye-ri
- Ch'ŏngryong-ri
- Kach'ol-li
- Kuŭp-ri
- Kuyŏl-li
- Kwanjŏng-ri
- Masal-li
- Obong-ri
- Ryujŏng-ri
- Samch'ŏl-li
- Songsal-li
- Sugong-ri
- Tokchŏng-ri
- Tosŏng-ri
- Ŭnjŏng-ri
- Yosong-ri

== Transport ==
Pongsan county is served by several stations on the P'yŏngbu and Hwanghae Ch'ŏngnyŏn lines of the Korean State Railway.
