= List of highways numbered 83 =

The following highways are numbered 83.

== International ==
- AH83 Asian Highway 83
- E83 European route E83

== Australia ==
- Eastern Highway in Melbourne
- B83 Pacific Highway
- Flinders Ranges Way, South Australia
- National Route 83 from Birdsville to Normanton in Queensland

== Canada ==
- Manitoba Highway 83
  - Manitoba Highway 83A

== Greece ==
- EO83 road

== India ==
- National Highway 83 (India)
- State Highway 83 (Uttar Pradesh)

== Korea, South ==
- National Route 83

== New Zealand ==
- New Zealand State Highway 83

== United Kingdom ==
- A83 road (Scotland)

== United States ==
- Interstate 83
- U.S. Route 83
- Alabama State Route 83
- Arizona State Route 83
- California State Route 83
- Colorado State Highway 83
- Connecticut Route 83
- Florida State Road 83
  - County Road 83 (Walton County, Florida)
    - County Road 83A (Walton County, Florida)
- Georgia State Route 83
- Hawaii Route 83
- Illinois Route 83
- Iowa Highway 83
- Kentucky Route 83
- Louisiana Highway 83
- Maryland Route 83 (former)
- Massachusetts Route 83
- M-83 (Michigan highway)
- Minnesota State Highway 83
  - County Road 83 (Scott County, Minnesota)
- Missouri Route 83
- Montana Highway 83
- Nebraska Highway 83 (former)
- New Jersey Route 83
  - County Route 83 (Bergen County, New Jersey)
  - County Route 83 (Ocean County, New Jersey)
- New Mexico State Road 83
- New York State Route 83
  - County Route 83 (Cayuga County, New York)
  - County Route 83 (Dutchess County, New York)
    - County Route 83A (Dutchess County, New York)
  - County Route 83 (Greene County, New York)
  - County Route 83 (Madison County, New York)
  - County Route 83 (Montgomery County, New York)
  - County Route 83 (Niagara County, New York)
  - County Route 83 (Onondaga County, New York)
  - County Route 83 (Rockland County, New York)
  - County Route 83 (Suffolk County, New York)
    - County Route 83A (Suffolk County, New York)
- North Carolina Highway 83
- Ohio State Route 83
- Oklahoma State Highway 83
- Pennsylvania Route 83 (former)
- South Carolina Highway 83
- South Dakota Highway 83
- Tennessee State Route 83
- Texas State Highway 83
  - Texas State Highway Loop 83
  - Farm to Market Road 83
- Utah State Route 83
- Virginia State Route 83
- West Virginia Route 83
- Wisconsin Highway 83

Territories

- U.S. Virgin Islands Highway 83

== See also ==
- A83

| Preceded by 82 | Lists of highways 83 | Succeeded by 84 |
