= List of highways numbered 82 =

The following highways are numbered 82:

== International ==
- AH82 Asian Highway 82
- E82 European route E82

== Greece ==
- EO82 road

== New Zealand ==
- New Zealand State Highway 82

== Philippines ==
- N82 highway (Philippines)

== South Korea ==
- National Route 82
- Gukjido 82

== United States ==
- Interstate 82
  - Interstate 82 (Oregon–Utah) (former proposal)
  - Interstate 82N (former proposal)
  - Interstate 82S (Utah) (former proposal)
  - Interstate 82 (Pennsylvania-New York) (former)
  - Interstate 82 (Connecticut–Rhode Island) (former)
- U.S. Route 82
- Arizona State Route 82
- Arkansas Highway 82 (1926) (former)
- California State Route 82
- Colorado State Highway 82
- Connecticut Route 82
- Delaware Route 82
- Florida State Road 82
- Georgia State Route 82
- Illinois Route 82
- Iowa Highway 82 (former)
- K-82 (Kansas highway)
- Kentucky Route 82
- Louisiana Highway 82
- Maryland Route 82 (former)
- M-82 (Michigan highway)
- Minnesota State Highway 82 (former)
- Missouri Route 82
- Montana Highway 82
- Nebraska Highway 82 (former)
  - Nebraska Recreation Road 82B
- Nevada State Route 82 (former)
- New Jersey Route 82
  - County Route 82 (Bergen County, New Jersey)
- New York State Route 82
  - County Route 82 (Chemung County, New York)
  - County Route 82 (Dutchess County, New York)
  - County Route 82 (Erie County, New York)
  - County Route 82 (Herkimer County, New York)
  - County Route 82 (Montgomery County, New York)
  - County Route 82 (Niagara County, New York)
  - County Route 82 (Oneida County, New York)
  - County Route 82 (Onondaga County, New York)
  - County Route 82 (Suffolk County, New York)
- North Carolina Highway 82
- Ohio State Route 82
- Oklahoma State Highway 82
- Oregon Route 82
- Pennsylvania Route 82
- Tennessee State Route 82
- Texas State Highway 82
  - Texas State Highway Loop 82
  - Farm to Market Road 82
- Utah State Route 82
- Virginia State Route 82
- West Virginia Route 82
- Wisconsin Highway 82

Territories

- U.S. Virgin Islands Highway 82

== See also ==
- List of highways numbered 82A
- A82 road

Preceded by 81	Lists of highways 82	Succeeded by 83
