= AH83 =

Road in Asia

Asian Highway 83 (AH83) is a road in the Asian Highway Network running 172 km (107.5 miles) from Qazax, Azerbaijan to Yerevan, Armenia. The route is as follows:

== Azerbaijan ==
- R23 Road: Qazax - Bala Cəfərli

== Armenia ==
- M-4 Highway: Paravakar - Yerevan
