= Route 82 (disambiguation) =

Route 82 could refer to:

- any of the highways numbered 82
- London Buses route 82
- Melbourne tram route 82
