= List of highways numbered 84 =

The following highways are numbered 84.

== International ==
- AH84 Asian Highway 84
- E84 European route E84

== Australia ==
- Golden Highway
- Wills Developmental Road (Queensland)

== Greece ==
- EO84 road

== Iran ==
- Road 84

== Korea, South ==
- Gukjido 84

== New Zealand ==
- New Zealand State Highway 84

== United States ==
- Interstate 84 (Oregon–Utah)
- Interstate 84 (Pennsylvania–Massachusetts)
- U.S. Route 84
- County Route 84 (Lee County, Alabama)
- Arizona State Route 84
  - Arizona State Route 84A
- Arkansas Highway 84
- California State Route 84
- Colorado State Highway 84 (1923-1968) (former)
- Florida State Road 84
- Georgia State Route 84
- Illinois Route 84
- K-84 (Kansas highway)
- Kentucky Route 84
- Maryland Route 84
- M-84 (Michigan highway)
- Minnesota State Highway 84
  - County Road 84 (Anoka County, Minnesota)
- Missouri Route 84
- Montana Highway 84
- Nebraska Highway 84
- Nevada State Route 84 (former)
- New Hampshire Route 84
- New Jersey Route 84
  - County Route 84 (Bergen County, New Jersey)
- New York State Route 84 (former)
  - County Route 84 (Broome County, New York)
  - County Route 84 (Chautauqua County, New York)
  - County Route 84 (Chemung County, New York)
  - County Route 84 (Dutchess County, New York)
  - County Route 84 (Erie County, New York)
  - County Route 84 (Essex County, New York)
  - County Route 84 (Greene County, New York)
  - County Route 84 (Jefferson County, New York)
  - County Route 84 (Livingston County, New York)
  - County Route 84 (Madison County, New York)
  - County Route 84 (Monroe County, New York)
  - County Route 84 (Onondaga County, New York)
  - County Route 84 (Rensselaer County, New York)
  - County Route 84 (Rockland County, New York)
  - County Route 84 (Schenectady County, New York)
  - County Route 84 (Suffolk County, New York)
- North Carolina Highway 84
- Ohio State Route 84
- Oklahoma State Highway 84
- Pennsylvania Route 84 (former)
- Rhode Island Route 84 (former)
- Tennessee State Route 84
- Texas State Highway 84
  - Texas State Highway Loop 84
  - Texas State Highway Spur 84 (former)
  - Farm to Market Road 84
  - Urban Road 84 (former)
- Utah State Route 84 (former)
- Virginia State Route 84
- West Virginia Route 84
- Wisconsin Highway 84 (former)

== See also ==
- A84

Preceded by 83	Lists of highways 84	Succeeded by 85
