= List of highways numbered 82A =

The following highways are numbered 82A:

== United States ==
- Nebraska Link 82A
- New York State Route 82A (former)
- Oklahoma State Highway 82A (former)

== See also ==
- List of highways numbered 82
