= National Route 77 (South Korea) =

Road in South Korea

National Route 77
- Busan-Paju Line 국도 제77호선

Route information
- Length: 1,239.4 km (770.1 mi)
- Existed: 25 August 2001–present

Major junctions
- South end: Jung District, Busan
- North end: Paju, Gyeonggi Province

Location
- Country: South Korea

Highway system
- Highway systems of South Korea; Expressways; National; Local

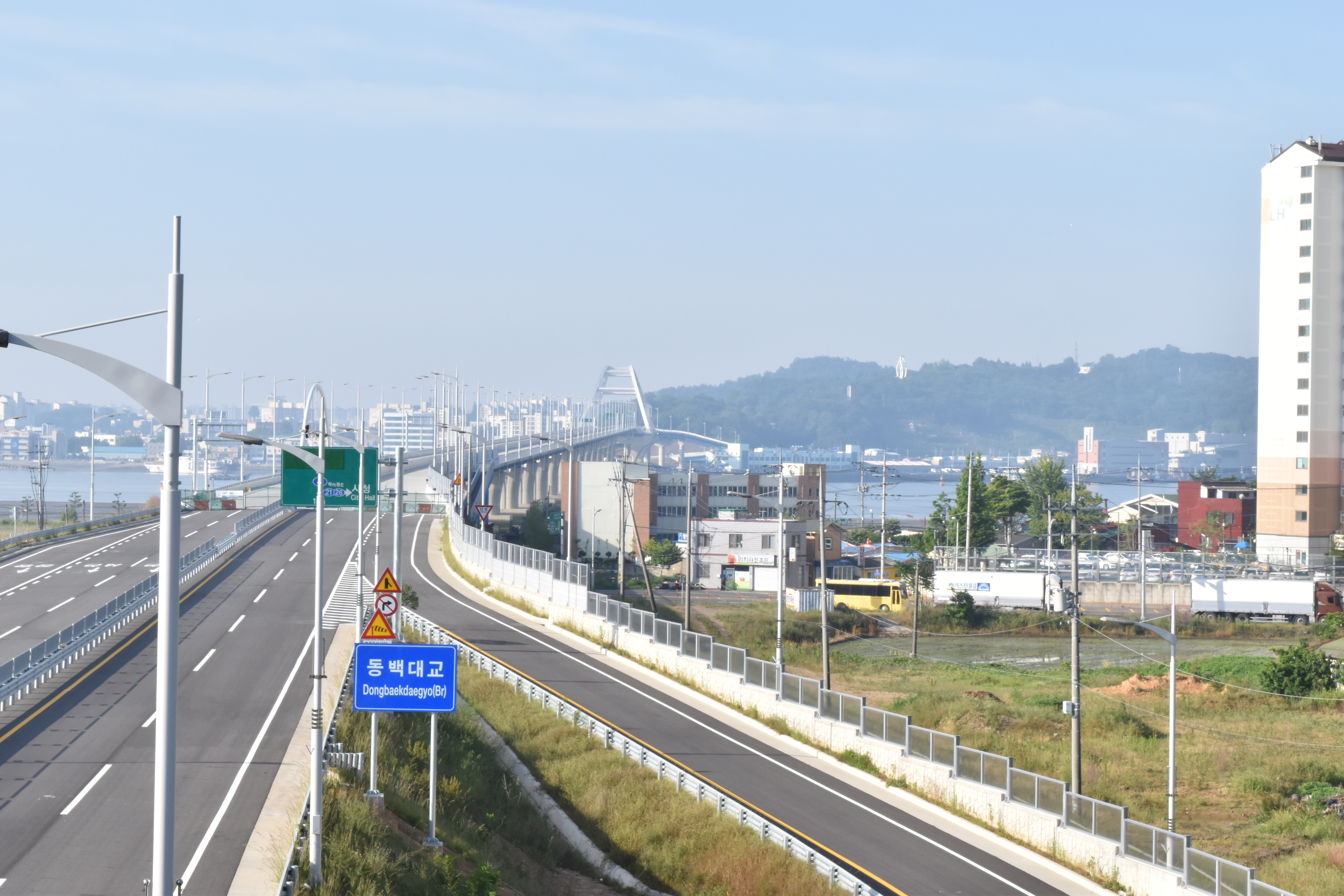
Dongbaekdaegyo Bridge on National Route No 77

National Route 77 is a national highway in South Korea connects Jung District, Busan to Paju. It was established on 25 August 2001.

== Main stopovers ==
Busan

- Jung District - Seo District - Saha District - Gangseo District

South Gyeongsang Province

- Changwon - Goseong County - Tongyeong - Goseong County - Sacheon - Namhae County

South Jeolla Province

- Yeosu - Goheung County - Boseong County - Jangheung County - Gangjin County - Wando County - Haenam County - Mokpo - Sinan County - Muan County - Yeonggwang County

North Jeolla Province

- Gochang County - Buan County - Gunsan

South Chungcheong Province

- Seocheon County - Boryeong - Taean County - Seosan - Dangjin - Asan

Gyeonggi Province

- Pyeongtaek - Hwaseong - Ansan - Siheung

Incheon

- Namdong District - Yeonsu District - Michuhol District - Jung District - Dong District - Michuhol District - Dong District - Seo District - Gyeyang District

Gyeonggi Province

- Bucheon

Seoul

- Gangseo District

Gyeonggi Province

- Bucheon

Seoul

- Gangseo District - Yeongdeungpo District - Mapo District

Gyeonggi Province

- Goyang - Paju

== Major intersections ==
- (■): Motorway

IS: Intersection, IC: Interchange

=== Busan ===
Name	Hangul name	Connection	Location		Note
Old City Hall IS (Old City Hall IS)	옛시청 교차로 (옛시청사거리)	National Route 7 (Jungang-daero); Taejong-ro	Busan	Jung District	Terminus; National Route 2 overlap
Nampo station	남포역		Busan	Jung District	National Route 2 overlap
Nampo IS	남포사거리	Junggu-ro; Jagalchi-ro 37beon-gil	Busan	Jung District	National Route 2 overlap
Jagalchi IS (Jagalchi station)	자갈치 교차로 (자갈치역)	Bosu-daero; Jagalchi-ro 15beon-gil	Busan	Jung District	National Route 2 overlap
Jagalchi IS (Jagalchi station)		Bosu-daero; Jagalchi-ro 15beon-gil	Busan	Seo District	National Route 2 overlap
Chungmu IS	충무 교차로	Chungmu-daero; Jagalchi-ro	Busan	Seo District	National Route 2 overlap
Toseong-dong Station	토성동역앞	Kkachigogae-ro	Busan	Seo District	National Route 2 overlap
Pusan National University Hospital Toseong station	부산대학교병원 토성역		Busan	Seo District	National Route 2 overlap
Bumin IS	부민사거리	Daecheong-ro; Imsisudoginyeom-ro	Busan	Seo District	National Route 2 overlap
Dong-a University Bumin Campus	동아대학교 부민캠퍼스		Busan	Seo District	National Route 2 overlap
Buyong IS	부용사거리	Buyong-ro	Busan	Seo District	National Route 2 overlap
Dongdaesin IS (Dongdaesin station)	동대신사거리 (동대신역)	Daeyeong-ro	Busan	Seo District	National Route 2 overlap
Gudeok Stadium IS	구덕운동장삼거리	Mangyang-ro	Busan	Seo District	National Route 2 overlap
Busan Gudeok Stadium	구덕운동장	Kkonmaeul-ro	Busan	Seo District	National Route 2 overlap
Seodaesin IS (Seodaesin station)	서대신사거리 (서대신역)	Daeyeong-ro; Daeti-ro; Gudeok-ro 321beon-gil	Busan	Seo District	National Route 2 overlap
Daeti Tunnel	대티터널		Busan	Seo District	National Route 2 overlap Approximately 401m
Daeti Tunnel			Busan	Saha District	National Route 2 overlap Approximately 401m
Daeti station Goejeong Elementary School	대티역 괴정초등학교		Busan	Saha District	National Route 2 overlap
Goejeong IS (Goejeong station)	괴정사거리 (괴정역)	Saha-ro; Nakdong-daero 216beon-gil	Busan	Saha District	National Route 2 overlap
Saha Elementary IS (Saha Elementary School)	사하초등삼거리 (사하초등학교)	Jangpyeong-ro	Busan	Saha District	National Route 2 overlap
Saha station	사하역		Busan	Saha District	National Route 2 overlap
Dangni Community Center IS	당리주민센타사거리	Dadae-ro; Nakdong-daero 372beon-gil	Busan	Saha District	National Route 2 overlap
(Saha District Office Entrance)	(사하구청입구)	Nakdong-daero 398beon-gil	Busan	Saha District	National Route 2 overlap
Dangni station	당리역		Busan	Saha District	National Route 2 overlap
Hadan IS	하단 교차로	Nakdong-daero; Seunghak-ro; Hasinjungang-ro	Busan	Saha District	National Route 2 overlap
Hadan station	하단역		Busan	Saha District	National Route 2 overlap
Hagu Dam IS	하구둑 교차로	Gangbyeon-daero	Busan	Saha District	National Route 2 overlap
Nakdonggang Estuary Bank	낙동강하굿둑		Busan	Saha District	National Route 2 overlap
Eulsuk-do Service Area	을숙도휴게소		Busan	Saha District	National Route 2 overlap
Myeongji IC	명지 나들목	Gonghang-ro	Busan	Gangseo District	National Route 2 overlap
Gyeongil Middle School Entrance	경일중학교입구	Yeonggang-gil; Nakdongnam-ro 1013beon-gil	Busan	Gangseo District	National Route 2 overlap
Cheongnyangsa Entrance	청량사어귀	Jedo-ro	Busan	Gangseo District	National Route 2 overlap
Busan Gangseo Police Station Noksan 2nd Bridge Noksan Bridge	부산강서경찰서 녹산제2교 녹산교		Busan	Gangseo District	National Route 2 overlap
Seongsan IS	성산삼거리	Prefectural Route 58 (Saenggong-ro)	Busan	Gangseo District	National Route 2 overlap
Noksan Middle School Nokmyeong Elementary School	녹산중학교 녹명초등학교		Busan	Gangseo District	National Route 2 overlap
Bonnoksan IS	본녹산삼거리	Hwajeonsaneop-daero	Busan	Gangseo District	National Route 2 overlap
Sanyang IS	산양삼거리	Noksanhwajeon-ro	Busan	Gangseo District	National Route 2 overlap
Noksong Overpass	녹송육교	Prefectural Route 58 (Garak-daero)	Busan	Gangseo District	National Route 2 overlap
Noksong Bridge	녹송교		Busan	Gangseo District	National Route 2 overlap
Yongwon IS	용원삼거리	Mangeum-ro; Sosa-Noksan Motorway	Busan	Gangseo District	National Route 2 overlap Continuation into South Gyeongsang Province

=== South Gyeongsang Province ===
Name	Hangul name	Connection	Location		Note
Yongwon IS	용원삼거리	Mangeum-ro; Sosa-Noksan Motorway	Changwon City	Jinhae District	National Route 2 overlap Busan - South Gyeongsang Province border line
Yongjae IS	용재삼거리	Yongwondong-ro	Changwon City	Jinhae District	National Route 2 overlap
Hoeyagol IS	회야골삼거리	Yongwonbuk-ro	Changwon City	Jinhae District	National Route 2 overlap
Yongwontaekji IS	용원택지 교차로	Angol-ro	Changwon City	Jinhae District	National Route 2 overlap
Songgok IS	송곡삼거리	Ancheong-ro	Changwon City	Jinhae District	National Route 2 overlap
Uigok IS	의곡 교차로	Bobae-ro	Changwon City	Jinhae District	National Route 2 overlap
Daejangcheon Bridge	대장천교		Changwon City	Jinhae District	National Route 2 overlap
Ungdong IS (Macheon Overpass)	웅동 교차로 (마천육교)	National Route 58 (Ungjang-ro); Namyeong-ro	Changwon City	Jinhae District	National Route 2 overlap
Seongnaecheon Bridge	성내천교		Changwon City	Jinhae District	National Route 2 overlap
Jaedeok 2 Bridge	재덕2교	Ungcheondong-ro	Changwon City	Jinhae District	National Route 2 overlap
Jaedeok Bridge	재덕교		Changwon City	Jinhae District	National Route 2 overlap
Sinnammun Bridge	신남문교	Ungcheonseo-ro	Changwon City	Jinhae District	National Route 2 overlap
Cheonja IS	천자 교차로	Ungcheon-ro	Changwon City	Jinhae District	National Route 2 overlap
Eoeun IS	어은 교차로	Eoeun-ro; Jukgok-ro	Changwon City	Jinhae District	National Route 2 overlap
Daebalryeong (Mannamui Square)	대발령 (만남의광장)		Changwon City	Jinhae District	National Route 2 overlap
Back of Jinhae-gu Office	진해구청후문	Haengam-ro; Jinhae-daero 1099beon-gil	Changwon City	Jinhae District	National Route 2 overlap
Jinhae-gu Office	진해구청		Changwon City	Jinhae District	National Route 2 overlap
Pungho IS (Pungho Overpass)	풍호사거리 (풍호고가교)	Cheonja-ro	Changwon City	Jinhae District	National Route 2 overlap
Pungho Elementary School IS	풍호초등교사거리	Pungho-ro	Changwon City	Jinhae District	National Route 2 overlap
Jaeunbon-dong IS	자은본동사거리	Jinhae-daero 975beon-gil	Changwon City	Jinhae District	National Route 2 overlap
Haegun Apartment IS	해군아파트사거리	Deoksan-ro	Changwon City	Jinhae District	National Route 2 overlap
Beotkkotma-eul IS	벚꽃마을사거리	Jinhae-daero 921beon-gil Jinhae-daero 922beon-gil	Changwon City	Jinhae District	National Route 2 overlap
Jaeun Bridge IS	자은교사거리	Jaeun Bridge	Changwon City	Jinhae District	National Route 2 overlap
Naengcheon IS	냉천사거리	Naengcheon-ro	Changwon City	Jinhae District	National Route 2 overlap
Manrideul IS	만리들사거리	Seokdong-ro	Changwon City	Jinhae District	National Route 2 overlap
Jinhae Police Station (Police Station IS)	진해경찰서 (경찰서삼거리)		Changwon City	Jinhae District	National Route 2 overlap
Seokdong Community Center Dolri IS	석동주민센터 돌리사거리	Dolli-ro; Jinhae-daero 776beon-gil	Changwon City	Jinhae District	National Route 2 overlap
3rd Square	3호광장	National Route 25 (Haewon-ro)	Changwon City	Jinhae District	National Route 2 overlap
Chamber of Commerce IS	상공회의소삼거리	Jinhae-daero 728beon-gil	Changwon City	Jinhae District	National Route 2 overlap
Junganggo IS	중앙고삼거리	Gyeonghwasijang-ro; Byeongambuk-ro	Changwon City	Jinhae District	National Route 2 overlap
Gyeonghwa station (Gyeonghwa Station IS)	경화역 (경화역삼거리)	Gyeonghwa-ro	Changwon City	Jinhae District	National Route 2 overlap
Saema-eul IS	새마을사거리	Jocheon-ro; Jinhae-daero 624beon-gil	Changwon City	Jinhae District	National Route 2 overlap
Gyeonghwa Overpass	경화고가교	Taebaek-ro; Taebaekseo-ro	Changwon City	Jinhae District	National Route 2 overlap
Yeojwa Overpass	여좌고가교		Changwon City	Jinhae District	National Route 2 overlap
Jinhae Overpass	진해고가교	Yeojwa-ro	Changwon City	Jinhae District	National Route 2 overlap
Citizen Hall IS	시민회관사거리	Yeojwacheon-ro 174beon-gil	Changwon City	Jinhae District	National Route 2 overlap
Gamanigol IS	가마니골삼거리	Yeojwacheon-ro	Changwon City	Jinhae District	National Route 2 overlap
Jangbok-ro IS	장복로사거리	Jangboksan-gil	Changwon City	Jinhae District	National Route 2 overlap
Jangbok Tunnel	장복터널		Changwon City	Jinhae District	National Route 2 overlap Approximately 840m
Jangbok Tunnel			Changwon City	Seongsan District	National Route 2 overlap Approximately 840m
Yanggok IC	양곡 나들목	Namhaean-daero; Bongyang-ro	Changwon City	Seongsan District	National Route 2 overlap
Yanggok Tunnel	양곡터널		Changwon City	Seongsan District	National Route 2 overlap Right tunnel: Approximately 1,046m Left tunnel: Approximately 1,135m
Gwisan Tunnel	귀산터널		Changwon City	Seongsan District	National Route 2 overlap Right tunnel: Approximately 403m Left tunnel: Approximately 345m
Gwisan 1 Bridge	귀산1교	Gwisan-ro	Changwon City	Seongsan District	National Route 2 overlap
Machang Bridge Toll Gate (Gwisangogae)	마창대교 요금소 (귀산고개)		Changwon City	Seongsan District	National Route 2 overlap
Machang Bridge	마창대교		Changwon City	Seongsan District	National Route 2 overlap Toll Road
Machang Bridge			Changwon City	Masanhappo District	National Route 2 overlap Toll Road
Gapo IS	가포 교차로	Dream bay-daero	Changwon City	Masanhappo District	National Route 2 overlap
Gapo Tunnel	가포터널		Changwon City	Masanhappo District	National Route 2 overlap Right tunnel: Approximately 1,230m Left tunnel: Approximately 1,235m
Hyeondong IS	현동 교차로	National Route 5 (Gyeongnam-daero); National Route 14; National Route 79 (Bambatgogae-ro)	Changwon City	Masanhappo District	National Route 2, National Route 5, National Route 14, National Route 79 overlap
Hyeondong JCT	현동 분기점	National Route 5	Changwon City	Masanhappo District	National Route 2, National Route 5, National Route 14, National Route 79 overlap
Dongjeon Tunnel Sindongjeon Tunnel	동전터널 신동전터널		Changwon City	Masanhappo District	National Route 2, National Route 14, National Route 79 overlap North-bound: Dongjeon Tunnel (Approximately 609m); South-bound: Sindongjeon Tunnel (Approximately 1,080m)
Dongjeon Tunnel Sindongjeon Tunnel			Changwon City	Masanhappo District Jindong-myeon	National Route 2, National Route 14, National Route 79 overlap North-bound: Dongjeon Tunnel (Approximately 609m); South-bound: Sindongjeon Tunnel (Approximately 1,080m)
Taebong IS	태봉 교차로	Taebong 2-gil	Changwon City	Masanhappo District Jindong-myeon	National Route 2, National Route 14, National Route 79 overlap
Osan IS	오산 교차로	Osan 3-gil	Changwon City	Masanhappo District Jindong-myeon	National Route 2, National Route 14, National Route 79 overlap
Sindaebang IS	신대방삼거리	Samjinuigeo-daero	Changwon City	Masanhappo District Jindong-myeon	National Route 2, National Route 14, National Route 79 overlap
Taebong Bridge	태봉교		Changwon City	Masanhappo District Jindong-myeon	National Route 2, National Route 14, National Route 79 overlap
Jinbuk Tunnel	진북터널		Changwon City	Masanhappo District Jindong-myeon	National Route 2, National Route 14, National Route 79 overlap Approximately 927m
Jinbuk Tunnel			Changwon City	Masanhappo District Jinbuk-myeon	National Route 2, National Route 14, National Route 79 overlap Approximately 927m
Jindong IS	진동 교차로	National Route 79; Prefectural Route 67 (Jinbuksaneop-ro)	Changwon City	Masanhappo District Jinbuk-myeon	National Route 2, National Route 14, National Route 79 overlap Prefectural Route 67 overlap
Daepyeong IS	대평 교차로	Prefectural Route 1021 (Hakdong-ro)	Changwon City	Masanhappo District Jinbuk-myeon	National Route 2, National Route 14 overlap Prefectural Route 67 overlap
Jisan JCT	지산 분기점	National Route 79	Changwon City	Masanhappo District Jinbuk-myeon	Under construction National Route 2, National Route 14 overlap Prefectural Route 67 overlap
Yegok IS	예곡 교차로	Uirim-ro	Changwon City	Masanhappo District Jinbuk-myeon	National Route 2, National Route 14 overlap Prefectural Route 67 overlap
Jinjeon Tunnel	진전터널		Changwon City	Masanhappo District Jinbuk-myeon	National Route 2, National Route 14 overlap Prefectural Route 67 overlap Right tunnel: Approximately 600m Left tunnel: Approximately 550m
Jinjeon Tunnel			Changwon City	Masanhappo District Jinjeon-myeon	National Route 2, National Route 14 overlap Prefectural Route 67 overlap Right tunnel: Approximately 600m Left tunnel: Approximately 550m
Jinmok IS	진목 교차로	National Route 2 National Route 14 (Namhaean-daero); Samjinuigeo-daero	Changwon City	Masanhappo District Jinjeon-myeon	National Route 2, National Route 14 overlap Prefectural Route 67 overlap
Ama IS	암아 교차로	Prefectural Route 1002; Prefectural Route 1021 (Samjinuigeo-daero)	Changwon City	Masanhappo District Jinjeon-myeon	Prefectural Route 67, 1002, 1021 overlap
Ichang Bridge	이창교		Changwon City	Masanhappo District Jinjeon-myeon	Prefectural Route 67, 1002, 1021 overlap
(West of Dongjin Bridge)	(동진교 서단)	Prefectural Route 1002 (Hoejin-ro)	Changwon City	Masanhappo District Jinjeon-myeon	Prefectural Route 67, 1002, 1021 overlap
Dongjin Bridge	동진교		Changwon City	Masanhappo District Jinjeon-myeon	Prefectural Route 67, 1021 overlap
Dongjin Bridge			Goseong County	Donghae-myeon	Prefectural Route 67, 1021 overlap
Naesan Industrial Complex	내산산업단지		Goseong County	Donghae-myeon	Prefectural Route 67, 1021 overlap
(Deokgok)	(덕곡)	Prefectural Route 1010 (Donghae-ro)	Goseong County	Donghae-myeon	Prefectural Route 67, 1021 overlap
Donghae Youth Centre (Former Donghae Elementary School Daedong Branch) Jangjwa Bridge Jangjwa Industrial Complex	동해청소년수련학교 (구 동해초등학교 대동분교) 장좌교 장좌산업단지		Goseong County	Donghae-myeon	Prefectural Route 67, 1021 overlap
Bonggok IS	봉곡삼거리	Georyu-ro	Goseong County	Georyu-myeon	Prefectural Route 67, 1021 overlap
Georyu Elementary School	거류초등학교		Goseong County	Georyu-myeon	Prefectural Route 67, 1021 overlap
Dangdong IS	당동삼거리	Prefectural Route 1009 (Georyu-ro)	Goseong County	Georyu-myeon	Prefectural Route 67, 1021 overlap
Georyu Athletic Park	거류체육공원		Goseong County	Georyu-myeon	Prefectural Route 67, 1021 overlap
Songgokchi	송곡치		Goseong County	Georyu-myeon	Prefectural Route 67, 1021 overlap
Songgokchi			Tongyeong City	Gwangdo-myeon	Prefectural Route 67, 1021 overlap
Hwangri IS	황리사거리	Gongdan-ro	Tongyeong City	Gwangdo-myeon	Prefectural Route 67, 1021 overlap
Anjeong National Industrial Complex Byeokbang Elementary School	안정국가산업단지 벽방초등학교		Tongyeong City	Gwangdo-myeon	Prefectural Route 67, 1021 overlap
Mujikgogae	무직고개		Tongyeong City	Gwangdo-myeon	Prefectural Route 67, 1021 overlap
Nosan IS (North Tongyeong IC)	노산삼거리 (북통영 나들목)	Tongyeong-Daejeon Expressway; National Route 14; Prefectural Route 58; Prefectural Route 67 (Namhaean-daero)	Tongyeong City	Gwangdo-myeon	National Route 14 overlap Prefectural Route 58, 67, 1021 overlap
Solgogae	솔고개		Tongyeong City	Dosan-myeon	National Route 14 overlap Prefectural Route 58, 1021 overlap
Gwandeok IS	관덕삼거리	Prefectural Route 1021 (Dosanilju-ro)	Tongyeong City	Dosan-myeon	National Route 14 overlap Prefectural Route 58, 1021 overlap
Dosan IS	도산삼거리	National Route 14 (Namhaean-daero)	Tongyeong City	Dosan-myeon	National Route 14 overlap Prefectural Route 58 overlap
Dosan Elementary School Dosan-myeon Office Dosan Middle School Gaochi Harbor	도산초등학교 도산면사무소 도산중학교 가오치항		Tongyeong City	Dosan-myeon	Prefectural Route 58 overlap
(Yuchon)	(유촌)		Tongyeong City	Dosan-myeon	Prefectural Route 58 overlap
(Unnamed bridge)	(교량 이름 미상)		Tongyeong City	Dosan-myeon	Under construction Connecting Dosan-myeon ~ Samsan-myeon
(Unnamed bridge)			Goseong County	Samsan-myeon	Under construction Connecting Dosan-myeon ~ Samsan-myeon
Jangji IS	장지삼거리	Prefectural Route 1010 (Gongryong-ro) (Dupo 5-gil)	Goseong County	Samsan-myeon	Prefectural Route 58 overlap
Samsan-myeon Office	삼산면사무소		Goseong County	Samsan-myeon	Prefectural Route 58 overlap
Yongho IS	용호삼거리	Prefectural Route 1010 (Dupo-ro)	Goseong County	Samsan-myeon	Prefectural Route 58 overlap
Samo Elementary School (Closed)	삼오초등학교(폐교)		Goseong County	Samsan-myeon	Prefectural Route 58 overlap
Jungchon IS	중촌삼거리	Jangchi-ro	Goseong County	Samsan-myeon	Prefectural Route 58 overlap
Hail Elementary School Sutae Branch (Closed)	하일초등학교 수태분교 (폐교)		Goseong County	Hail-myeon	Prefectural Route 58 overlap
Impo IS	임포삼거리	Jaranman-ro	Goseong County	Hail-myeon	Prefectural Route 58 overlap
Hakrim Bridge Hail Middle School Hail-myeon Office	학림교 하일중학교 하일면사무소		Goseong County	Hail-myeon	Prefectural Route 58 overlap
Wolheung IS	월흥사거리	Wolheung 3-gil	Goseong County	Hai-myeon	Prefectural Route 58 overlap
Hai Elementary School Wolheung Branch (Closed)	하이초등학교 월흥분교 (폐교)		Goseong County	Hai-myeon	Prefectural Route 58 overlap
Jeonggok IS	정곡삼거리	Sangjokam-ro	Goseong County	Hai-myeon	Prefectural Route 58 overlap
Hai-myeon Office	하이면사무소		Goseong County	Hai-myeon	Prefectural Route 58 overlap
Sindeok IS	신덕사거리	Prefectural Route 1001 (Hai-myeon)	Goseong County	Hai-myeon	Prefectural Route 58 overlap
Hai Elementary School	하이초등학교		Goseong County	Hai-myeon	Prefectural Route 58 overlap
Deokho Bridge	덕호교		Goseong County	Hai-myeon	Prefectural Route 58 overlap
Deokho Bridge			Sacheon City	Hyangchon-dong	Prefectural Route 58 overlap
Hyangchonsapjae Agricultural Complex	향촌삽재농공단지		Sacheon City	Hyangchon-dong	Prefectural Route 58 overlap
Hyangchon IS	향촌사거리	Donggeum-ro; Hyangchon 4-gil	Sacheon City	Hyangchon-dong	Prefectural Route 58 overlap
Donggeun IS	동금사거리	Sinhang-ro	Sacheon City	Dongseogeum-dong	Prefectural Route 58 overlap
Sacheon Police Station	사천경찰서		Sacheon City	Dongseogeum-dong	Prefectural Route 58 overlap
2nd Square IS	2호광장 교차로	Prefectural Route 1016 (Samsang-ro); Jungang-ro	Sacheon City	Dongseogeum-dong	Prefectural Route 58 overlap
Mokjeon Building IS	목전빌딩사거리	Donggeum-ro; Hannae-ro	Sacheon City	Dongseogeum-dong	Prefectural Route 58 overlap
Samcheonpo Bridge	삼천포교		Sacheon City	Dongseogeum-dong	Prefectural Route 58 overlap
Samcheonpo Bridge			Sacheon City	Seongu-dong	Prefectural Route 58 overlap
Junggang Market IS	중앙시장사거리	Jungang-ro; Geoneosijang-gil	Sacheon City	Seongu-dong	Prefectural Route 58 overlap
Samcheonpo Elementary School Seongu-dong Community Center	삼천포초등학교 선구동주민센터		Sacheon City	Seongu-dong	Prefectural Route 58 overlap
Daebang Elementary School	대방초등학교		Sacheon City	Dongseo-dong	Prefectural Route 58 overlap
Gaksan IS	각산사거리	Yuramseon-gil	Sacheon City	Dongseo-dong	Prefectural Route 58 overlap
Daebang IS	대방사거리	Daebang-gil	Sacheon City	Dongseo-dong	Prefectural Route 58 overlap
Daebang IS	대방 교차로	National Route 3 Prefectural Route 58 (Sacheon-daero)	Sacheon City	Dongseo-dong	National Route 3 overlap Prefectural Route 58 overlap
Samcheonpo Bridge	삼천포대교		Sacheon City	Dongseo-dong	National Route 3 overlap
Mogae-do	모개도		Sacheon City	Dongseo-dong	National Route 3 overlap
Choyang Bridge	초양대교		Sacheon City	Dongseo-dong	National Route 3 overlap
Choyang-do	초양도	Choyang-gil	Sacheon City	Dongseo-dong	National Route 3 overlap
Neukdo Bridge	늑도대교		Sacheon City	Dongseo-dong	National Route 3 overlap
Neuk-do	늑도	Neukdo-gil	Sacheon City	Dongseo-dong	National Route 3 overlap
Changseon Bridge	창선대교		Sacheon City	Dongseo-dong	National Route 3 overlap
Changseon Bridge			Namhae County	Changseon-myeon	National Route 3 overlap
Danhang IS	단항사거리	Prefectural Route 1024 (Seobu-ro); Dongbu-daero 2964beon-gil	Namhae County	Changseon-myeon	National Route 3 overlap
No name	(이름 없음)	Yuldo-ro	Namhae County	Changseon-myeon	National Route 3 overlap
Dangjeo Bridge	당저교	Prefectural Route 1024 (Heungseon-ro); Changseon-ro 66beon-gil	Namhae County	Changseon-myeon	National Route 3 overlap
Jijok IS	지족삼거리	Prefectural Route 1024 (Seobu-ro)	Namhae County	Changseon-myeon	National Route 3 overlap Prefectural Route 1024 overlap
Changseon Bridge	창선교		Namhae County	Changseon-myeon	National Route 3 overlap Prefectural Route 1024 overlap
Changseon Bridge			Namhae County	Samdong-myeon	National Route 3 overlap Prefectural Route 1024 overlap
Jijok IS	지족삼거리	Prefectural Route 1024 (Sami-ro)	Namhae County	Samdong-myeon	National Route 3 overlap Prefectural Route 1024 overlap
Samdong-myeon Welfare Center Namsu Middle School Gyeongnam Marine Science High School Hanlyo Youth Hostel Samdong Elementary School Mulgeon-ri (Dokilma-eul)	삼동면종합복지회관 남수중학교 경남해양과학고등학교 한려유스호스텔 삼동초등학교 물건리 (독일마을)		Namhae County	Samdong-myeon	National Route 3 overlap
Chojeon IS	초전삼거리	National Route 19 (Namhae-daero)	Namhae County	Mijo-myeon	National Route 3 overlap National Route 19 overlap
Songjeong Beach	송정해수욕장		Namhae County	Mijo-myeon	National Route 19 overlap
Sangju Junior High School Sangju Beach Sangju-myeon Office SangjuElementary School	상주중학교 상주해수욕장 상주면사무소 상주초등학교		Namhae County	Sangju-myeon	National Route 19 overlap
Sangjuhyeon	상주현		Namhae County	Sangju-myeon	National Route 19 overlap
No name	(이름 없음)	Boriam-ro	Namhae County	Idong-myeon	National Route 19 overlap
Sinjeon IS	신전삼거리	Prefectural Route 1024 (Namseo-daero)	Namhae County	Idong-myeon	National Route 19 overlap Prefectural Route 1024 overlap
Idong IS	이동 교차로	Prefectural Route 1024 (Sami-ro); Murim-ro	Namhae County	Idong-myeon	National Route 19 overlap Prefectural Route 1024 overlap
No name	(이름 없음)	Murim-ro	Namhae County	Idong-myeon	National Route 19 overlap
Namhae weather station Garlic Land of Treasure Island Namhae Agricultural Technology Center	남해기상관측소 보물섬 마늘나라 남해군 농업기술센터		Namhae County	Idong-myeon	National Route 19 overlap
Iphyeon Bridge	입현교		Namhae County	Namhae-eup	National Route 19 overlap
Nambyeon IS	남변사거리	Seupocheu-ro; Hwajeon-ro	Namhae County	Namhae-eup	National Route 19 overlap
Gyeongnam Namhae College	경남도립남해대학		Namhae County	Namhae-eup	National Route 19 overlap
Namhae Underpass	남해지하차도		Namhae County	Namhae-eup	National Route 19 overlap
Namhae Jeil High School Namhae Intercity Bus Terminal	남해제일고등학교 남해시외버스터미널		Namhae County	Namhae-eup	National Route 19 overlap
Simcheon IS	심천삼거리	Hwajeon-ro	Namhae County	Namhae-eup	National Route 19 overlap
No name	(이름 없음)	Hwabang-ro	Namhae County	Gohyeon-myeon	National Route 19 overlap
Doma Elementary School	도마초등학교		Namhae County	Gohyeon-myeon	National Route 19 overlap
Seongsan IS	성산삼거리	Prefectural Route 1024 (Seolcheon-ro)	Namhae County	Gohyeon-myeon	National Route 19 overlap Prefectural Route 1024 overlap
No name	(이름 없음)	Jilgae-ro	Namhae County	Gohyeon-myeon	National Route 19 overlap Prefectural Route 1024 overlap
Tapdong IS	탑동 교차로	National Route 19 (Namhae-daero)	Namhae County	Gohyeon-myeon	National Route 19 overlap Prefectural Route 1024 overlap
Posang Bridge	포상교		Namhae County	Gohyeon-myeon	Prefectural Route 1024 overlap
Sambema-eul (Former Gohyeon Elementary School Galhwa Branch)	삼베마을 (구 고현초등학교 갈화분교)		Namhae County	Gohyeon-myeon	Prefectural Route 1024 overlap
Jeongpo IS	정포삼거리	Jeongpo-ro	Namhae County	Seo-myeon	Prefectural Route 1024 overlap
Junghyeon Welfare Center (Former Seongmyeong Elementary School Junghyeon Branch)	중현지구복지회관 (구 성명초등학교 중현분교)		Namhae County	Seo-myeon	Prefectural Route 1024 overlap
Hoeryong IS	회룡삼거리	Hwabang-ro	Namhae County	Seo-myeon	Prefectural Route 1024 overlap
Nogu-ri	노구리		Namhae County	Seo-myeon	Prefectural Route 1024 overlap
Hanryeo Bridge	한려대교		Namhae County	Seo-myeon	Under construction Connecting Namhae County ~ Yeosu; Continuation into South Jeolla Province

=== South Jeolla Province ===
Name	Hangul name	Connection	Location		Note
Hanryeo Bridge	한려대교		Yeosu City	Samil-dong	Under construction Connecting Namhae County ~ Yeosu; South Gyeongsang Province - South Jeolla Province border line
Nakpo Pier	낙포부두		Yeosu City	Samil-dong	
Nakpo IS	낙포삼거리	Yeosusandan-ro	Yeosu City	Samil-dong	
Sangam IS	상암삼거리	Mangyang-ro	Yeosu City	Samil-dong	
Sangam Elementary School	상암초등학교		Yeosu City	Samil-dong	
Dundeok IC	둔덕 나들목	National Route 17 (Expo-daero)	Yeosu City	Dundeok-dong	
Yeodo Middle School Yeodo Elementary School	여도중학교 여도초등학교		Yeosu City	Dundeok-dong	
Dundeok IS	둔덕삼거리	Jwasuyeong-ro	Yeosu City	Dundeok-dong	
Citypark Resort	시티파크리조트		Yeosu City	Dundeok-dong	
Dundeokmun Entrance IS (Jeonnam University Dundeok Campus)	둔덕문입구삼거리 (전남대학교 둔덕캠퍼스)		Yeosu City	Dundeok-dong	
Dundeok-dong Welfare Center	둔덕동행정복지센터		Yeosu City	Dundeok-dong	
11th Square IS	11호광장 교차로	Manseong-ro; Ssangbong-ro	Yeosu City	Dundeok-dong	
Seongsim Hospital IS	성심병원앞 교차로	Dundeok 4-gil Dundeok 5-gil	Yeosu City	Dundeok-dong	
Yeosu Mipyeong Elementary School	여수미평초등학교		Yeosu City	Mipyeong-dong	
Mipyeong IS	미평삼거리	Mipyeong-ro	Yeosu City	Mipyeong-dong	
Munsu IS	문수삼거리	Munsu-ro	Yeosu City	Gwangnim-dong	
E-mart Yeosu Store Yeosu Bus Terminal	이마트 여수점 여수종합버스터미널		Yeosu City	Gwangnim-dong	
Bus Terminal IS	버스터미널앞 교차로	Jinnamcheyukgwan-gil	Yeosu City	Gwangnim-dong	
Orim IS	오림삼거리	Chungmin-ro	Yeosu City	Gwangnim-dong	
Yeosu Jinnam Elementary School	여수진남초등학교		Yeosu City	Gwangnim-dong	
Yeondeung 2 Bridge	연등2교		Yeosu City	Gwangnim-dong	
Yeondeung 2 Bridge			Yeosu City	Chungmu-dong	
Yeosu Citizen Hall	여수시민회관	Chungmu-ro	Yeosu City	Chungmu-dong	
Hanjae IS	한재사거리	Jinnam-ro; Hanjae-ro	Yeosu City	Seogang-dong	
Seogyo-dong Rotary	서교동로터리	Namsan-ro; Jungang-ro; Seogyo 1-gil	Yeosu City	Seogang-dong	
Dolsan Bridge Entrance IS	돌산대교입구 교차로	Bonggang-ro; Sinwol-ro	Yeosu City	Daegyo-dong	
Bongsan Market Entrance	봉산시장입구	Bongsan 1-ro	Yeosu City	Daegyo-dong	
Bongsan Elementary School	봉산초등학교앞	Bongsan 2-ro	Yeosu City	Daegyo-dong	
(Dolsan Bridge Entrance)	(돌산대교입구)	Namsan-ro	Yeosu City	Daegyo-dong	
Dolsan Bridge	돌산대교		Yeosu City	Daegyo-dong	
Dolsan Bridge			Yeosu City	Dolsan-eup	
Dolsan Park	돌산공원		Yeosu City	Dolsan-eup	
Dolsan IS	돌산 교차로	National Route 17 (Expo-daero)	Yeosu City	Dolsan-eup	National Route 17 overlap
Seguji IS	세구지삼거리	Gangnam-ro	Yeosu City	Dolsan-eup	National Route 17 overlap
No name	(이름 없음)	Gangnamhaean-ro	Yeosu City	Dolsan-eup	National Route 17 overlap
Yi Sun-sin Monument	이충무공전적비		Yeosu City	Dolsan-eup	National Route 17 overlap
Musulmok IS	무술목삼거리	Gyedong-ro	Yeosu City	Dolsan-eup	National Route 17 overlap
Dosil IS	도실삼거리	Pyeongsa-ro	Yeosu City	Dolsan-eup	National Route 17 overlap
Dolsan Jungang Middle School	돌산중앙중학교		Yeosu City	Dolsan-eup	National Route 17 overlap
Jakgokjae IS	작곡재삼거리	Gyedong-ro	Yeosu City	Dolsan-eup	National Route 17 overlap
Jukpo IS	죽포삼거리	Hyangiram-ro	Yeosu City	Dolsan-eup	National Route 17 overlap
Deokgokjae	덕곡재		Yeosu City	Dolsan-eup	National Route 17 overlap
Geumbong IS	금봉삼거리	Pyeongsa-ro	Yeosu City	Dolsan-eup	National Route 17 overlap
Dolsan-eup Welfare Center	돌산읍행정복지센터		Yeosu City	Dolsan-eup	National Route 17 overlap
Dongnae IS	동내삼거리	Mangwoldae-gil	Yeosu City	Dolsan-eup	
Yeosu Marine Science High School Dolsan Middle School Dolsan Confucianism School Dolsan Elementary School	여수해양과학고등학교 돌산중학교 돌산향교 돌산초등학교		Yeosu City	Dolsan-eup	
Sinbok-ri	신복리	Dolsan-ro	Yeosu City	Dolsan-eup	
Hwatae Bridge	화태대교		Yeosu City	Dolsan-eup	
Hwatae Bridge			Yeosu City	Nam-myeon	
Hwatae Bridge IS	화태대교삼거리	Hwatae-gil; Myodu-gil	Yeosu City	Nam-myeon	
Wolho Bridge	월호대교		Yeosu City	Nam-myeon	Under construction Connecting Hwatae-do ~ Wolho-do
Wolho Bridge			Yeosu City	Hwajeong-myeon	Under construction Connecting Hwatae-do ~ Wolho-do
Wolho-do	월호도	Prefectural Route 863	Yeosu City	Hwajeong-myeon	Under construction Prefectural Route 863 overlap
Gaedo Bridge	개도대교		Yeosu City	Hwajeong-myeon	Under construction Prefectural Route 863; Connecting Wolho-do ~ Gae-do
Gae-do	개도		Yeosu City	Hwajeong-myeon	Under construction Prefectural Route 863 overlap
Jedo Bridge	제도대교		Yeosu City	Hwajeong-myeon	Under construction Prefectural Route 863 overlap Connecting Gae-do ~ Jedo
Je-do	제도		Yeosu City	Hwajeong-myeon	Under construction Prefectural Route 863 overlap
Hwajeong Bridge	화정대교		Yeosu City	Hwajeong-myeon	Under construction Prefectural Route 863 overlap Connecting Je-do ~ Baekya-do
(Baekya Lighthouse Entrance)	(백야등대입구)		Yeosu City	Hwajeong-myeon	Prefectural Route 863 overlap
Baekya IS	백야삼거리	Baegyahaean-gil	Yeosu City	Hwajeong-myeon	Prefectural Route 863 overlap
Hwabaek IS	화백삼거리	Hwabaek-gil	Yeosu City	Hwajeong-myeon	Prefectural Route 863 overlap
Baekya Bridge	백야대교		Yeosu City	Hwajeong-myeon	Prefectural Route 863 overlap
Baekya Bridge			Yeosu City	Hwayang-myeon	Prefectural Route 863 overlap
Baekya Bridge IS	백야대교삼거리	Hwayang-ro	Yeosu City	Hwayang-myeon	Prefectural Route 863 overlap
Sepo IS	세포삼거리	Prefectural Route 22 (Hwayang-ro)	Yeosu City	Hwayang-myeon	Prefectural Route 863 overlap
Hwayang Middle School Hwayangnam Branch	화양중학교 화양남분교		Yeosu City	Hwayang-myeon	Prefectural Route 863 overlap
Hwayang Elementary School Hwanam Branch (Closed)	화양초등학교 화남분교 (폐교)		Yeosu City	Hwayang-myeon	Prefectural Route 863 overlap
Jamae IS	자매삼거리	Jamae-ro	Yeosu City	Hwayang-myeon	Prefectural Route 863 overlap
Gongjeongma-eul	공정마을	Prefectural Route 863 (Hwaseo-ro)	Yeosu City	Hwayang-myeon	Prefectural Route 863 overlap
Hwayang Bridge	화양대교		Yeosu City	Hwayang-myeon	Under construction Connecting Gongjeongma-eul ~ Jobal-do
Hwayang Bridge			Yeosu City	Hwajeong-myeon	Under construction Connecting Gongjeongma-eul ~ Jobal-do
Jobal-do	조발도		Yeosu City	Hwajeong-myeon	Under construction
Jobal Bridge	조발대교		Yeosu City	Hwajeong-myeon	Under construction Connecting Jobal-do ~ Dunbyeong-do
Dunbyeong-do	둔병도		Yeosu City	Hwajeong-myeon	Under construction
Dunbyeong Bridge	둔병대교		Yeosu City	Hwajeong-myeon	Under construction Connecting Dunbyeong-do ~ Nang-do
Nang-do	낭도		Yeosu City	Hwajeong-myeon	Under construction
Nangdo Bridge	낭도대교		Yeosu City	Hwajeong-myeon	Under construction Connecting Nang-do ~ Jeokgeum-do
Jeokgeum IS	적금 교차로		Yeosu City	Hwajeong-myeon	
Palyeong Bridge	팔영대교		Yeosu City	Hwajeong-myeon	
Palyeong Bridge			Goheung County	Yeongnam-myeon	
Yeongnam IS	영남 교차로	Paryeong-ro; Ucheonudu-gil	Goheung County	Yeongnam-myeon	
Jeomam-myeon Osan IS	점암면오산 교차로	Prefectural Route 843 (Neunggasa-ro)	Goheung County	Jeoman-myeon	
Sinseong IS	신성삼거리	Haemaji-ro	Goheung County	Yeongnam-myeon	
Nampo Arts Museum (Former Yeongnam Middle School)	남포미술관 (구 영남중학교)		Goheung County	Yeongnam-myeon	
Yangsa IS	양사삼거리	Haemaji-ro	Goheung County	Yeongnam-myeon	
Yeongnam Elementary School	영남초등학교		Goheung County	Yeongnam-myeon	
Manho IS	만호삼거리	Cheonsa-ro	Goheung County	Yeongnam-myeon	
Neungjeong Bridge	능정교		Goheung County	Yeongnam-myeon	
Neungjeong Bridge			Goheung County	Jeomam-myeon	
Haechangman IS	해창만삼거리		Goheung County	Podu-myeon	
Haechangman Seawall Haechang 3 Bridge	해창만방조제 해창3교		Goheung County	Podu-myeon	
O-do	오도	Ochwi-gil	Goheung County	Podu-myeon	
Haechangman 2 Seawall Naecho Bridge	해창만2방조제 내초교		Goheung County	Podu-myeon	
Okgang IS	옥강삼거리	National Route 15; Prefectural Route 15 (Uju-ro); Oecho-gil	Goheung County	Podu-myeon	National Route 15과 중복; Prefectural Route 15 overlap
Podunam Middle School (Closed)	포두남중학교 (폐교)		Goheung County	Podu-myeon	National Route 15과 중복; Prefectural Route 15 overlap
Bongam IS	봉암삼거리	Bongam-gil	Goheung County	Podu-myeon	National Route 15과 중복; Prefectural Route 15 overlap
Dongnae-do IS	동래도삼거리		Goheung County	Podu-myeon	National Route 15과 중복; Prefectural Route 15 overlap
Namseong IS	남성삼거리	National Route 15; Prefectural Route 15 (Uju-ro)	Goheung County	Podu-myeon	National Route 15과 중복; Prefectural Route 15 overlap
Namseong Elementary School (Closed)	남성초등학교 (폐교)		Goheung County	Podu-myeon	
Seoksupo IS	석수포삼거리	Bongsan-ro	Goheung County	Dohwa-myeon	
Balpo IS	발포삼거리	Prefectural Route 855 (Chumgmusa-gil)	Goheung County	Dohwa-myeon	Prefectural Route 855 overlap
Danggon IS	당곤삼거리	Bongsan-ro	Goheung County	Dohwa-myeon	Prefectural Route 855 overlap
Dohwa-myeon Dango IS	도화면당오 교차로	Prefectural Route 855 (Dohwa-ro)	Goheung County	Dohwa-myeon	Prefectural Route 855 overlap
Ochi Bridge	오치교	Dangocheonbyeon 2-gil	Goheung County	Dohwa-myeon	
Dohwa-myeon Imok-dong IS	도화면이목동 교차로	Guam-ro; Imokdong-gil	Goheung County	Dohwa-myeon	
Yeouicheon Bridge	여의천교	Deosuyeonan-gil	Goheung County	Dohwa-myeon	
Gangdong Bridge	강동교		Goheung County	Pungyang-myeon	
Pungnam IS	풍남삼거리	Prefectural Route 851 (Pungnam-ro)	Goheung County	Pungyang-myeon	
No name	(이름 없음)	Yuja-ro	Goheung County	Pungyang-myeon	
Oma 2 Bridge	오마2교		Goheung County	Pungyang-myeon	
1st Seawall	1호방조제		Goheung County	Pungyang-myeon	
1st Seawall			Goheung County	Dodeok-myeon	
Oma 1 Bridge 2nd Seawall	오마1교; 2호방조제		Goheung County	Dodeok-myeon	
Oma IS	오마삼거리	Oma-ro	Goheung County	Dodeok-myeon	
3rd Seawall	3호방조제		Goheung County	Dodeok-myeon	
3rd Seawall			Goheung County	Doyang-eup	
Bongam 1 Bridge	봉암1교		Goheung County	Doyang-eup	
Bongseo IS	봉서삼거리	Bibong-ro	Goheung County	Doyang-eup	
No name	(이름 없음)	Ujuhanggong-ro; Cheonma-ro	Goheung County	Doyang-eup	
Bus Terminal IS	버스터미널삼거리	Cheonma-ro; Beonyeong 1-gil	Goheung County	Doyang-eup	
Nokdong IS	녹동오거리	Bibong-ro; Cheonma-ro; Bibongttuk-gil; Chagyeong-gil	Goheung County	Doyang-eup	
Chagyeong IS (Yongjeong IS)	차경사거리 (용정 교차로)	National Route 27 (Geogeum-ro); Chagyeonggureongmok-gil	Goheung County	Doyang-eup	National Route 27 overlap
Sangyu IS	상유삼거리	Goheung-ro	Goheung County	Doyang-eup	National Route 27 overlap
Dochon IS	도촌 교차로	Goheung-ro; Dochon-gil	Goheung County	Dodeok-myeon	National Route 27 overlap
Dodeok IS	도덕 교차로	Goheung-ro	Goheung County	Dodeok-myeon	National Route 27 overlap
Dangdu IS	당두 교차로	Gongho-gil	Goheung County	Pungyang-myeon	National Route 27 overlap
Pungyang IS	풍양 교차로	Hosan-ro	Goheung County	Pungyang-myeon	National Route 27 overlap
Sangnim IS	상림 교차로	Prefectural Route 851 (Goheung-ro)	Goheung County	Pungyang-myeon	National Route 27 overlap
Deungam IS	등암 교차로	Goheung-ro	Goheung County	Goheung-eup	National Route 27 overlap
Bonggye IS	봉계 교차로	Bonggye 2-gil	Goheung County	Goheung-eup	National Route 27 overlap
Hohyeong IS	호형 교차로	National Route 15; Prefectural Route 15 (Uju-ro); Bongdongjugong-gil	Goheung County	Goheung-eup	
Hohyeong IS	호형 교차로	National Route 15; Prefectural Route 15 (Uju-ro); Hakgyo-gil	Goheung County	Goheung-eup	National Route 15, National Route 27 overlap Prefectural Route 15 overlap
Namgye IS	남계 교차로	고흥로	Goheung County	Goheung-eup	National Route 15, National Route 27 overlap Prefectural Route 15 overlap
Jideung IS	지등 교차로	Goheung-ro	Goheung County	Duwon-myeon	National Route 15, National Route 27 overlap Prefectural Route 15 overlap
Undae IS	운대 교차로	Prefectural Route 830 (Duwonunseok-gil); Goheung-ro; Geumo-gil	Goheung County	Duwon-myeon	National Route 15, National Route 27 overlap Prefectural Route 15 overlap
Sinan IS	신안 교차로	Goheung-ro	Goheung County	Jeomam-myeon	National Route 15, National Route 27 overlap Prefectural Route 15 overlap
Yeonbong IS	연봉 교차로	Prefectural Route 855 (Haechang-ro); Goheung-ro	Goheung County	Jeomam-myeon	National Route 15, National Route 27 overlap Prefectural Route 15 overlap
Seokbong IS	석봉 교차로	Gwayeok-ro	Goheung County	Gwayeok-myeon	National Route 15, National Route 27 overlap Prefectural Route 15 overlap
Gwayeok IS	과역 교차로	Goheung-ro	Goheung County	Gwayeok-myeon	National Route 15, National Route 27 overlap Prefectural Route 15 overlap
Nosong IS	노송 교차로	Goheung-ro; Gwayeok-ro	Goheung County	Gwayeok-myeon	National Route 15, National Route 27 overlap Prefectural Route 15 overlap
Namyang IS	남양 교차로	Goheung-ro; Namyang-ro; Namyanghuimang-gil	Goheung County	Namyang-myeon	National Route 15, National Route 27 overlap Prefectural Route 15 overlap
Tanpo IS	탄포 교차로	National Route 15; National Route 27; Prefectural Route 15 (Ujuhanggong-ro); Goheung-ro; Apyeong-gil; Ungyojugok-gil	Goheung County	Namyang-myeon	National Route 15, National Route 27 overlap Prefectural Route 15 overlap
Tanpo IS	탄포삼거리	Goheung-ro	Goheung County	Namyang-myeon	
Daeseo-myeon Sangnam-ri IS	대서면상남리 교차로	Songnim-ro	Goheung County	Daeseo-myeon	
Seokjang IS	석장사거리	Dongseo-ro	Goheung County	Daeseo-myeon	
Namjeong IS	남정삼거리	Dongseo-ro	Goheung County	Daeseo-myeon	
Maehyeon Bridge	매현교		Boseong County	Joseong-myeon	
Joseong IS	조성사거리	Joseong-ro	Boseong County	Joseong-myeon	
Sinwol IS	신월삼거리	National Route 2 Prefectural Route 843 (Noksaek-ro)	Boseong County	Joseong-myeon	National Route 2 overlap Prefectural Route 843 overlap
Joseong IS	조성삼거리	Joseong-ro	Boseong County	Joseong-myeon	National Route 2 overlap Prefectural Route 843 overlap
Joseongnam Elementary School	조성남초등학교		Boseong County	Joseong-myeon	National Route 2 overlap Prefectural Route 843 overlap
Yedang IS	예당사거리	Yedang-gil; Pacheong-gil	Boseong County	Deungnyang-myeon	National Route 2 overlap Prefectural Route 843 overlap
Gundu IS	군두사거리	Prefectural Route 843; Prefectural Route 845 (Chungui-ro)	Boseong County	Deungnyang-myeon	National Route 2 overlap Prefectural Route 843 overlap
Geureokjae	그럭재		Boseong County	Deungnyang-myeon	National Route 2 overlap
Geureokjae			Boseong County	Miryeok-myeon	National Route 2 overlap
Chodang IS	초당 교차로	National Route 18 (Hwabo-ro); Heungseong-ro	Boseong County	Miryeok-myeon	National Route 2, National Route 18 overlap
Jangsu IS	장수 교차로	National Route 2 (Noksaek-ro)	Boseong County	Boseong-eup	National Route 2, National Route 18 overlap
Onsu IS	온수 교차로		Boseong County	Boseong-eup	National Route 18 overlap
Botjae IS	봇재 교차로	Boseong tea field	Boseong County	Hoecheon-myeon	National Route 18 overlap
Bamgogae IS	밤고개삼거리	Prefectural Route 845 (Nambugwangwang-ro)	Boseong County	Hoecheon-myeon	National Route 18 overlap
Hoeryeong IS	회령삼거리	Prefectural Route 895 (Ilim-ro)	Boseong County	Hoecheon-myeon	National Route 18 overlap
Hoeryeong IS	회령삼거리	Prefectural Route 845 (Nambugwangwang-ro)	Boseong County	Hoecheon-myeon	National Route 18 overlap
Yonggok IS	용곡 교차로	Prefectural Route 819 (Sumunyonggong-ro)	Jangheung County	Anyang-myeon	National Route 18 overlap
Sumun Tunnel	수문터널		Jangheung County	Anyang-myeon	National Route 18 overlap Approximately 180m
Surak IS	수락 교차로	Sumunyonggong-ro; Surak-gil	Jangheung County	Anyang-myeon	National Route 18 overlap
Sinchon IS	신촌 교차로	Anyang-ro	Jangheung County	Anyang-myeon	National Route 18 overlap
Sachon IS	사촌 교차로	Sumunyonggong-ro	Jangheung County	Anyang-myeon	National Route 18 overlap
Unjeong IS	운정사거리	Anyang-ro	Jangheung County	Anyang-myeon	National Route 18 overlap
Suyang IS	수양삼거리	National Route 18 (Nambugwangwang-ro)	Jangheung County	Anyang-myeon	National Route 18 overlap
Pungam IS	풍암삼거리	Anyang-ro	Jangheung County	Anyang-myeon	
Yongsan-myeon Chadong-ri IS	용산면차동리 교차로	Deogampunggil-ro	Jangheung County	Yongsan-myeon	
Gyesan Elementary School (Closed)	계산초등학교 (폐교)		Jangheung County	Yongsan-myeon	
Yongsan-myeon Inam-ri IS	용산면인암리 교차로	Inam-gil	Jangheung County	Yongsan-myeon	
Jangheung Yongsan Middle School	장흥용산중학교		Jangheung County	Yongsan-myeon	
Yongsan IS	용산삼거리	National Route 23 (Jangheung-daero)	Jangheung County	Yongsan-myeon	National Route 23 overlap
Yongsan-myeon Welfare Center Yongsan Elementary School	용산면 행정복지센터 용산초등학교		Jangheung County	Yongsan-myeon	National Route 23 overlap
Jeopjeong IS	접정삼거리	Jeopjeongnampo-ro	Jangheung County	Yongsan-myeon	National Route 23 overlap
Solchijae IS	솔치재 교차로	Gwansan-ro	Jangheung County	Yongsan-myeon	National Route 23 overlap
Solchijae	솔치재		Jangheung County	Yongsan-myeon	National Route 23 overlap
Solchijae			Jangheung County	Gwansan-eup	National Route 23 overlap
No name	(이름 없음)	Prefectural Route 827 (Jeongnamjin-ro)	Jangheung County	Gwansan-eup	National Route 23 overlap
Bangchon IS	방촌사거리	Gwansan-ro; Cheongwansan-gil	Jangheung County	Gwansan-eup	National Route 23 overlap
Bangchon IS	방촌삼거리	Bangchon-gil; Bangchon 1-gil	Jangheung County	Gwansan-eup	National Route 23 overlap
Gwansannam Elementary School	관산남초등학교		Jangheung County	Gwansan-eup	National Route 23 overlap
Samsan Seawall IS	삼산방조제 교차로	Samsan-ro	Jangheung County	Gwansan-eup	National Route 23 overlap
Gwanheung IS	관흥삼거리	Gwanheunghoejin-ro	Jangheung County	Gwansan-eup	National Route 23 overlap
Yeonji IS	연지 교차로	Prefectural Route 819 (Hoejin-ro)	Jangheung County	Daedeok-eup	National Route 23 overlap
No name	(이름 없음)	Docheongsinwol-ro	Jangheung County	Daedeok-eup	National Route 23 overlap
Sinri IS	신리삼거리	Sinriyongam-ro	Jangheung County	Daedeok-eup	National Route 23 overlap
Habun Bridge	하분교		Jangheung County	Daedeok-eup	National Route 23 overlap
Habun Bridge			Gangjin County	Maryang-myeon	National Route 23 overlap
Sukma IS	숙마삼거리	Samma-ro	Gangjin County	Maryang-myeon	National Route 23 overlap
Yeongdong IS	영동삼거리	Mihang-ro	Gangjin County	Maryang-myeon	National Route 23 overlap
Maryang IS	마량 교차로	National Route 23 (Cheongja-ro)	Gangjin County	Maryang-myeon	National Route 23 overlap
Sinma IS	신마 교차로	Samma-ro	Gangjin County	Maryang-myeon	
Gogeum Bridge	고금대교		Gangjin County	Maryang-myeon	
Gogeum Bridge			Wando County	Gogeum-myeon	
Gogeum IS	고금 교차로	Gyoseong-gil	Wando County	Gogeum-myeon	
Korea Electric Power Corporation Gogeum Center	한국전력 고금센터	Prefectural Route 830 (Gogeumdong-ro)	Wando County	Gogeum-myeon	
Gogeum Elementary School	고금초교앞 교차로	Gogeumdong-ro; Gogeumseo-ro	Wando County	Gogeum-myeon	
Sangjeong-ri	상정리		Wando County	Gogeum-myeon	
Jangbogo Bridge	장보고대교		Wando County	Gogeum-myeon	Connecting Gogeum-do ~ Sinji-do
Jangbogo Bridge			Wando County	Sinji-myeon	Connecting Gogeum-do ~ Sinji-do
Songgok IS	송곡 교차로	Prefectural Route 13 (Sinji-ro)	Wando County	Sinji-myeon	Prefectural Route 13 overlap
Dwitgol IS	뒷골 교차로		Wando County	Sinji-myeon	Prefectural Route 13 overlap
Mulhatae IS	물하태 교차로	Sinji-ro 6beon-gil	Wando County	Sinji-myeon	Prefectural Route 13 overlap
Gangdok IS	강독 교차로	Gangdok-gil	Wando County	Sinji-myeon	Prefectural Route 13 overlap
Sinji Bridge	신지대교		Wando County	Sinji-myeon	Prefectural Route 13 overlap
Sinji Bridge			Wando County	Wando-eup	Prefectural Route 13 overlap
Wando IS	완도 교차로	National Route 13 (Wando-ro)	Wando County	Wando-eup	Prefectural Route 13 overlap
Wando Fisheries High School	완도수산고등학교		Wando County	Wando-eup	
Wando-eup Gayong-ri IS	'완도읍가용리 교차로	Jangbogo-daero; Gaepo-ro	Wando County	Wando-eup	
Wando Stadium	완도종합운동장		Wando County	Wando-eup	
Wando-eup Mangseok-ri IS	완도읍망석리 교차로	Cheonghaejinnam-ro	Wando County	Wando-eup	
Wando-eup Seokjang-ri IS	완도읍석장리 교차로		Wando County	Wando-eup	
Wando Elementary School Gugye Branch (Closed)	완도초등학교 구계분교 (폐교)		Wando County	Wando-eup	
Wando-eup Sajeong-ri IS	완도읍사정리 교차로	Gugyedeung-gil	Wando County	Wando-eup	
Wando-eup Jeongdo-ri IS	완도읍정도리 교차로	Hwaheungpo-gil	Wando County	Wando-eup	
Hwaheung Elementary School Haesin Film Location	화흥초등학교 해신촬영장		Wando County	Wando-eup	
Gunoe-myeon Samdu-ri IS	군외면삼두리 교차로	Cheonghaejinseo-ro 1598beon-gil	Wando County	Gunoe-myeon	
Gunoenam Elementary School (Closed)	군외남초등학교 (폐교)		Wando County	Gunoe-myeon	
Sumokwon IS	수목원삼거리	Cheonghaejinbung-ro	Wando County	Gunoe-myeon	
Gunoe Elementary School Gunoe-myeon Welfare Center Wondong Public Bus Stop	군외초등학교 군외면 행정복지센터 원동공용버스정류장		Wando County	Gunoe-myeon	
Wondong IS	원동 교차로	National Route 13 (Wando-ro)	Wando County	Gunoe-myeon	National Route 13 overlap
Wando Bridge	완도대교		Wando County	Gunoe-myeon	National Route 13 overlap
Daldo IS	달도 교차로	Cheonghaejin-ro	Wando County	Gunoe-myeon	National Route 13 overlap
Namchang Bridge	남창교		Wando County	Gunoe-myeon	National Route 13 overlap
Namchang Bridge			Haenam County	Bukpyeong-myeon	National Route 13 overlap
Namchang IS	남창 교차로	National Route 13 (Ttangkkeut-daero); Prefectural Route 55 (Baek-doro)	Haenam County	Bukpyeong-myeon	National Route 13 overlap
Bukpyeongnam Elementary School (Closed) Namseong Harbour	북평남초등학교 (폐교) 남성항		Haenam County	Bukpyeong-myeon	
Sculpture Park	땅끝조각공원		Haenam County	Songji-myeon	
Songji-myeon Galdu-ri IS	송지면갈두리 교차로	Ttangkkeutmaeul-gil	Haenam County	Songji-myeon	
Songho Beach Ttangkkeut Hwangto Camping Site	송호해수욕장 땅끝황토나라		Haenam County	Songji-myeon	
Daejuk IS	대죽삼거리	Daejuk-gil	Haenam County	Songji-myeon	
Eomnam IS	엄남삼거리	Eomnampo-gil	Haenam County	Songji-myeon	
Songji-myeon Sanjeong-ri IS	송지면산정리 교차로	Sanjeong-gil; Eomnampo-gil	Haenam County	Songji-myeon	
Sanjeong IS	산정사거리	Eoran-ro; Sanjeong-gil	Haenam County	Songji-myeon	
Mihak 1 Bridge Mihak 2 Bridge	미학1교 미학2교		Haenam County	Songji-myeon	
Songji-myeon Sinpyeong-ri IS	송지면신평리 교차로	Miya-gil	Haenam County	Songji-myeon	
Songam Bridge	송암교		Haenam County	Songji-myeon	
Songam IS	송암 교차로	Ttangkkeutaean-ro	Haenam County	Songji-myeon	
Hyeonsan Bridge	현산교		Haenam County	Songji-myeon	
Hyeonsan Bridge			Haenam County	Hyeonsan-myeon	
Hwasan Bridge	화산교		Haenam County	Hwasan-myeon	
Anho-ri	안호리		Haenam County	Hwasan-myeon	Under construction
Pyeongho-ri	평호리		Haenam County	Hwasan-myeon	Under construction
Hwasannam Elementary School	화산남초등학교		Haenam County	Hwasan-myeon	
Simok IS	시목삼거리	Seojae-gil	Haenam County	Hwasan-myeon	
Hwasan IS	화산삼거리	Haenamhwasan-ro	Haenam County	Hwasan-myeon	
Hwasan-myeon Office	화산면사무소		Haenam County	Hwasan-myeon	
Wolho IS	월호삼거리	Haenamhwasan-ro	Haenam County	Hwasan-myeon	
Yuldong IS	율동삼거리	Bukbu-gil	Haenam County	Hwasan-myeon	
Gocheonam Seawall	고천암방조제		Haenam County	Hwasan-myeon	
Gocheonam Seawall			Haenam County	Hwangsan-myeon	
Hwangsan-myeon Sinjeong-ri IS	황산면신정리 교차로	Songhan-gil	Haenam County	Hwangsan-myeon	
Namri IS	남리 교차로	National Route 18 (Gongnyong-daero)	Haenam County	Hwangsan-myeon	National Route 18 overlap
Gwanchun IS	관춘 교차로	Myeongnyang-ro	Haenam County	Hwangsan-myeon	National Route 18 overlap
Sagyo IS	사교 교차로	Myeongnyang-ro	Haenam County	Munnae-myeon	National Route 18 overlap
Usuyeong IS	우수영 교차로	National Route 18 (Gwangwangnejeo-ro); Prefectural Route 803 (Gongnyong-daero)	Haenam County	Munnae-myeon	National Route 18 overlap
Seokgyo IS	석교 교차로	Munnaehwawon-ro	Haenam County	Munnae-myeon	
Oeam IS	외암 교차로	Oeam-gil	Haenam County	Munnae-myeon	
Gongyeong IS	공영 교차로	Gongyeong-gil	Haenam County	Munnae-myeon	
Jangchun IS	장춘 교차로	Gaecho-gil; Ilseong-gil	Haenam County	Hwawon-myeon	
Imok IS	이목 교차로	Beotdeung-gil	Haenam County	Hwawon-myeon	
Seongsan IS	성산 교차로	Gwangwang-ro; Munhnaewawon-ro; Sindeokho-gil	Haenam County	Hwawon-myeon	
Cheongryong Bridge	청룡교		Haenam County	Hwawon-myeon	
Yeongho IS	영호 교차로	Cheongyong-gil	Haenam County	Hwawon-myeon	
Guji IS	구지 교차로	Prefectural Route 49 (Gwangwangnejeo-ro)	Haenam County	Hwawon-myeon	
(Wolho Super)	(월호슈퍼)	Gwangwang-ro	Haenam County	Hwawon-myeon	
Hwawom Elementary School Hwawonbuk Branch (Closed)	화원초등학교 화원북분교 (폐교)		Haenam County	Hwawon-myeon	
Maewol-ri	매월리		Haenam County	Hwawon-myeon	
(Unnamed bridge)	(교량 이름 미상)		Haenam County	Hwawon-myeon	Under construction Connecting Hwawon-myeon ~ Dalri-do
(Unnamed bridge)			Mokpo City	Yulda-dong	Under construction Connecting Hwawon-myeon ~ Dalri-do
Dalri-do	달리도		Mokpo City	Yulda-dong	Under construction
(Unnamed bridge)	(교량 이름 미상)		Mokpo City	Yulda-dong	Under construction Connecting Dalri-do ~ Yul-do
Yul-do	율도		Mokpo City	Yulda-dong	Under construction
(Unnamed bridge)	(교량 이름 미상)		Mokpo City	Yulda-dong	Under construction Connecting Yul-do ~ Aphae-do
(Unnamed bridge)			Sinan County	Aphae-eup	Under construction Connecting Yul-do ~ Aphae-do
Aphae-do Berth	압해도선착장		Sinan County	Aphae-eup	Aphae ~ Hwawon Motorway designated section
No name	(이름 없음)	Janggam-gil	Sinan County	Aphae-eup	Aphae ~ Hwawon Motorway designated section
Sinan County Office	신안군청		Sinan County	Aphae-eup	Aphae ~ Hwawon Motorway designated section
Sinjang IS	신장 교차로	National Route 2 (Aphae-ro)	Sinan County	Aphae-eup	National Route 2 overlap
Aphaedong Elementary School Sinan County Library	압해동초등학교 신안군립도서관		Sinan County	Aphae-eup	National Route 2 overlap
Aphae-eup Welfare Center	압해읍행정복지센터	National Route 2 (Aphae-ro)	Sinan County	Aphae-eup	National Route 2 overlap
Aphae Elementary School Sinan County Gymnasium	압해초등학교 신안군민체육관		Sinan County	Aphae-eup	
No name	(이름 없음)	Garyong-gil	Sinan County	Aphae-eup	
Boknyong IS	복룡 교차로	Bongnyong-ro	Sinan County	Aphae-eup	
Gimdaejung Bridge	김대중대교		Sinan County	Aphae-eup	
Gimdaejung Bridge			Muan County	Unnam-myeon	
Seongnae IS	성내 교차로	Yeonghae-ro	Muan County	Unnam-myeon	
Yeonri IS	연리 교차로	Unhae-ro	Muan County	Unnam-myeon	
Palhak IS	팔학 교차로	Yeonghae-ro	Muan County	Unnam-myeon	
Dugok IS	두곡 교차로	Unnamsinchon-gil	Muan County	Unnam-myeon	
Songhyeon IS	송현 교차로	Jogeumnaru-gil	Muan County	Mangun-myeon	
Mangun IS	망운 교차로	Gonghang-ro	Muan County	Mangun-myeon	Connected with Muan Airport
Mokdong IS	목동 교차로	National Route 24	Muan County	Hyeongyeong-myeon	
Hyeongyeong IS	현경 교차로	National Route 24 (Hamjang-ro); Prefectural Route 60 (Gonghang-ro)	Muan County	Hyeongyeong-myeon	National Route 24 overlap
Pyeongsan IS	평산삼거리	Hyeonnam-gil	Muan County	Hyeongyeong-myeon	National Route 24 overlap
Hyeongyeong-myeon Welfare Center	현경면 행정복지센터		Muan County	Hyeongyeong-myeon	National Route 24 overlap
Hyeongyeong IS	현경삼거리	Prefectural Route 815 (Unhae-ro)	Muan County	Hyeongyeong-myeon	National Route 24 overlap
Songjeong IS	송정삼거리	Mangun-ro	Muan County	Hyeongyeong-myeon	National Route 24 overlap
Songjeong IS	송정 교차로	Sangsujang-gil	Muan County	Hyeongyeong-myeon	National Route 24 overlap Under construction
Yongjeong IS	용정 교차로	Bongwol-ro	Muan County	Hyeongyeong-myeon	National Route 24 overlap Under construction
Bongoje IS	봉오제삼거리	Bongwol-ro	Muan County	Hyeongyeong-myeon	National Route 24 overlap
Hyeongyeongbuk Elementary School	현경북초등학교		Muan County	Hyeongyeong-myeon	National Route 24 overlap
Masan IS	마산 교차로	Masan-gil; Sinjeong-gil	Muan County	Hyeongyeong-myeon	National Route 24 overlap Under construction
Holtong IS	홀통 교차로	Masan-gil	Muan County	Hyeongyeong-myeon	National Route 24 overlap Under construction
Jindeung IS	진등 교차로	Gaip-gil	Muan County	Hyeongyeong-myeon	National Route 24 overlap Under construction
Suam IS	수암 교차로	National Route 24 (Haejeji-doro)	Muan County	Haeje-myeon	National Route 24 overlap
Wolam IS	월암 교차로	Dalbawi-gil	Muan County	Haeje-myeon	Under construction
Hakcheon IS	학천 교차로	Hyeonhae-ro	Muan County	Haeje-myeon	Under construction
Tochi IS	토치삼거리	Prefectural Route 805 (Hyeonhae-ro)	Muan County	Haeje-myeon	Prefectural Route 805 overlap
Haejedong Elementary School (Closed)	해제동초등학교 (폐교)		Muan County	Haeje-myeon	Prefectural Route 805 overlap
Sinman IS	신만 교차로	Sinman-gil	Muan County	Haeje-myeon	Under construction Prefectural Route 805 overlap
Ipseok IS	입석 교차로		Muan County	Haeje-myeon	Under construction Prefectural Route 805 overlap
Kwangju Women's University Student Training Center	광주여대학생수련원		Muan County	Haeje-myeon	Prefectural Route 805 overlap
Doripo Harbour	도리포항		Muan County	Haeje-myeon	Prefectural Route 805 overlap
Chilsan Bridge	칠산대교		Muan County	Haeje-myeon	Under construction Prefectural Route 805 overlap
Chilsan Bridge			Yeonggwang County	Yeomsan-myeon	Under construction Prefectural Route 805 overlap
Hyanghwado Harbour	향화도항		Yeonggwang County	Yeomsan-myeon	Prefectural Route 805 overlap
Oksil IS	옥실삼거리	Prefectural Route 808 (Sonmu-ro)	Yeonggwang County	Yeomsan-myeon	Prefectural Route 805, 808 overlap
Songheung Elementary School (Closed)	송흥초등학교 (폐교)		Yeonggwang County	Yeomsan-myeon	Prefectural Route 805, 808 overlap
Yeomsan-myeon Odong-ri IS	염산면오동리 교차로	Odong-gil	Yeonggwang County	Yeomsan-myeon	Prefectural Route 805, 808 overlap
Seoldo Harbour	설도항		Yeonggwang County	Yeomsan-myeon	Prefectural Route 805, 808 overlap
Yeomsan-myeon	염산면소재지	Prefectural Route 808 (Cheonnyeon-ro)	Yeonggwang County	Yeomsan-myeon	Prefectural Route 805, 808 overlap
Yeomsan-myeon Office	염산면사무소	Chilsan-ro; Chilsan-ro 1-gil	Yeonggwang County	Yeomsan-myeon	Prefectural Route 805 overlap
Yeomsan Elementary School IS	염산초등학교 교차로	Chilsan-ro 3-gil	Yeonggwang County	Yeomsan-myeon	Prefectural Route 805 overlap
Yeomsan Elementary School	염산초등학교		Yeonggwang County	Yeomsan-myeon	Prefectural Route 805 overlap
Yawol IS	야월삼거리	Bongdeok-ro	Yeonggwang County	Yeomsan-myeon	Prefectural Route 805 overlap
Changuma-eul	창우마을		Yeonggwang County	Yeomsan-myeon	Under construction Prefectural Route 805 overlap
Hasa-ri	하사리		Yeonggwang County	Baeksu-eup	Under construction Prefectural Route 805 overlap
Jisan Bridge	지산교		Yeonggwang County	Baeksu-eup	Prefectural Route 805 overlap
Baeksu-eup Daejeon-ri IS	백수읍대전리 교차로	Prefectural Route 805 (Baeksu-ro)	Yeonggwang County	Baeksu-eup	Prefectural Route 805 overlap
Baeksuseo Elementary School Honggok Branch (Closed)	백수서초등학교 홍곡분교 (폐교)		Yeonggwang County	Baeksu-eup	
No name	(이름 없음)	Haean-ro	Yeonggwang County	Baeksu-eup	
Daesin 1 Bridge Daesin 2 Bridge	대신1교 대신2교		Yeonggwang County	Baeksu-eup	
Daesin 3 Bridge	대신3교	Haean-ro	Yeonggwang County	Baeksu-eup	
Yeonggwang Bridge	영광대교		Yeonggwang County	Baeksu-eup	
Yeonggwang Bridge			Yeonggwang County	Hongnong-eup	
(Unnamed IS)	(교차로 명칭 미상)	Chilgok-ro	Yeonggwang County	Hongnong-eup	
(Wolgokma-eul)	(월곡마을)	Chilgok-ro	Yeonggwang County	Hongnong-eup	
Chilgok IS	칠곡삼거리	Prefectural Route 842 (Gamami-ro)	Yeonggwang County	Hongnong-eup	Prefectural Route 842 overlap
Hongnongnam Elementary School (Closed)	홍농남초등학교 (폐교)		Yeonggwang County	Hongnong-eup	Prefectural Route 842 overlap
Hongnong-eup Sangha-ri IS	홍농읍상하리 교차로	Prefectural Route 15; Prefectural Route 842 (Yeonu-ro)	Yeonggwang County	Hongnong-eup	Prefectural Route 15, 842 overlap
Hongnong IS	홍농사거리	Prefectural Route 15 (Hongnong-ro)	Yeonggwang County	Hongnong-eup	Prefectural Route 15 overlap
Hongnong Elementary School Dongmyeong Branch (Closed)	홍농초등학교 동명분교 (폐교)		Yeonggwang County	Hongnong-eup	
Gahak IS	가학삼거리	Saemmok-ro	Yeonggwang County	Hongnong-eup	
Wolpyeong IS	월평삼거리	Jindeok-ro	Yeonggwang County	Hongnong-eup	
Wolam-ri	월암리		Yeonggwang County	Hongnong-eup	Continuation into North Jeolla Province

=== North Jeolla Province ===
Name	Hangul name	Connection	Location		Note
Yongdae-ri	용대리		Gochang County	Sangha-myeon	South Jeolla Province - North Jeolla Province border line
Yongdae IS	용대삼거리	National Route 22; Prefectural Route 15 (Seonun-daero)	Gochang County	Sangha-myeon	National Route 22 overlap Prefectural Route 15 overlap
Yongdeok IS	용덕삼거리	Sangha-ro	Gochang County	Sangha-myeon	National Route 22 overlap Prefectural Route 15 overlap
Sangha IS	상하 교차로	Prefectural Route 733 overlap (Jinamgusipo-ro)	Gochang County	Sangha-myeon	National Route 22 overlap Prefectural Route 15, Prefectural Route 733 overlap
Sin IS	신사거리	Sangha 1-gil	Gochang County	Sangha-myeon	National Route 22 overlap Prefectural Route 15, Prefectural Route 733 overlap
Sangha Terminal	상하터미널		Gochang County	Sangha-myeon	National Route 22 overlap Prefectural Route 15, Prefectural Route 733 overlap
Geomsan IS	검산삼거리	Sangha-ro	Gochang County	Sangha-myeon	National Route 22 overlap Prefectural Route 15, Prefectural Route 733 overlap
Jiro IS	지로사거리	Prefectural Route 733 (Naseong-ro)	Gochang County	Haeri-myeon	National Route 22 overlap Prefectural Route 15, Prefectural Route 733 overlap
Bangchuk IS	방축삼거리	Saban-ro	Gochang County	Haeri-myeon	National Route 22 overlap Prefectural Route 15 overlap
Wanggeo IS	왕거삼거리		Gochang County	Haeri-myeon	National Route 22 overlap Prefectural Route 15 overlap
Gungsan IS	궁산삼거리	Prefectural Route 15 (Dongseo-daero)	Gochang County	Haeri-myeon	National Route 22 overlap Prefectural Route 15 overlap
Palhyeongchi IS	팔형치사거리	National Route 22 (Seonun-daero)	Gochang County	Haeri-myeon	National Route 22 overlap
Mokdong IS	목동 교차로	Bongsu-ro	Gochang County	Haeri-myeon	
Dongho IS	동호 교차로	Aehyanggaetbeol-ro	Gochang County	Haeri-myeon	
Dongho Beach	동호해수욕장		Gochang County	Haeri-myeon	
Buchang Bridge	부창대교		Gochang County	Haeri-myeon	
Buchang Bridge			Buan County	Byeonsan-myeon	
Docheong-ri	도청리	National Route 30 (Byeonsan-ro)	Buan County	Byeonsan-myeon	National Route 30 overlap
Eonpo IS	언포 교차로	Gyeokpo-ro; Gunghang-ro	Buan County	Byeonsan-myeon	National Route 30 overlap
Docheong IS	도청 교차로	Gyeokpo-ro	Buan County	Byeonsan-myeon	National Route 30 overlap
Gyeokpo IS	격포 교차로	Gyeokpo-ro	Buan County	Byeonsan-myeon	National Route 30 overlap
Jongam IS	종암 교차로	Gyeokpo-ro; Mapo-ro	Buan County	Byeonsan-myeon	National Route 30 overlap
Mapo IS	마포 교차로	Prefectural Route 736 (Mapo-ro)	Buan County	Byeonsan-myeon	National Route 30 overlap Prefectural Route 736 overlap
Unsan IS	운산 교차로	Prefectural Route 736 (Jiseo-ro); Byeonsanhaebyeon-ro	Buan County	Byeonsan-myeon	National Route 30 overlap Prefectural Route 736 overlap
Byeonsan IS	변산 교차로	Jiseo-ro	Buan County	Byeonsan-myeon	National Route 30 overlap
Byeonsan Beach	변산해수욕장		Buan County	Byeonsan-myeon	National Route 30 overlap
Saemangeum IS	새만금 교차로	National Route 30 (Byeonsan-ro)	Buan County	Byeonsan-myeon	National Route 30 overlap
Saemangeum Seawall
Sinsi-do Entrance IS	신시도입구삼거리	Bieung-ro	Gunsan City	Soryong-dong	National Route 4 overlap
Expo IS	엑스포사거리	National Route 21 (Saemangeumbuk-ro)	Gunsan City	Soryong-dong	National Route 4, National Route 21 overlap
Byeonjeonso IS	변전소사거리	Dongjangsan-ro; Oehang-ro	Gunsan City	Soryong-dong	National Route 4, National Route 21 overlap
Daewoo IS	대우삼거리	Jangsan-ro	Gunsan City	Soryong-dong	National Route 4, National Route 21 overlap
Yeogaek Terminal IS	여객터미널삼거리	Imhae-ro	Gunsan City	Soryong-dong	National Route 4, National Route 21 overlap
Gongdan IS	공단삼거리	Gongdan-daero	Gunsan City	Soryong-dong	National Route 4, National Route 21 overlap
Oego IS	외고삼거리	National Route 26 (Gonghang-ro)	Gunsan City	Soryong-dong	National Route 4, National Route 21 overlap
Dongbaek Bridge	동백대교		Gunsan City	Haesin-dong	Under construction National Route 4 overlap Continuation into South Chungcheong Province

=== South Chungcheong Province ===
Name	Hangul name	Connection	Location		Note
Dongbaek Bridge	동백대교		Seocheon County	Janghang-eup	Under construction National Route 4 overlap North Jeolla Province - South Chungcheong Province border line
Wonsu IS	원수 교차로	Prefectural Route 68 (Jangsan-ro)	Seocheon County	Janghang-eup	National Route 4 overlap
Songnae IS	송내 교차로	National Route 21 (Geumgang-ro)	Seocheon County	Maseo-myeon	National Route 4, National Route 21 overlap
Janghang Station IS	장항역사거리	Janghangyeok-gil; Janghangsandan-ro	Seocheon County	Maseo-myeon	National Route 4, National Route 21 overlap
Deokam IS	덕암교차로	Okdo-ro	Seocheon County	Maseo-myeon	National Route 4, National Route 21 overlap
Samsan IS	삼산교차로	Samsan-gil	Seocheon County	Seocheon-eup	National Route 4, National Route 21 overlap
Gunsa 2 IS	군사2교차로	Jangseo-ro	Seocheon County	Seocheon-eup	National Route 4, National Route 21 overlap
Gunsa IS	군사교차로	Chungjeol-ro	Seocheon County	Seocheon-eup	National Route 4, National Route 21 overlap
No name	(이름 없음)	Sagok-ro	Seocheon County	Seocheon-eup	National Route 4, National Route 21 overlap
Seocheon IS	서천사거리	National Route 4 (Daebaekje-ro); Seocheon-ro	Seocheon County	Seocheon-eup	National Route 4, National Route 21 overlap
Hwangchon Bridge	황촌교		Seocheon County	Seocheon-eup	National Route 21 overlap
Osan Bridge	오산교		Seocheon County	Seocheon-eup	National Route 21 overlap
Osan Bridge			Seocheon County	Jongcheon-myeon	National Route 21 overlap
Sancheon IS	산천 교차로	Chungseo-ro 92beon-gil	Seocheon County	Jongcheon-myeon	National Route 21 overlap
Hwasan IS	화산 교차로	Jongcheonhwasan-gil; Chungseo-ro 143beon-gil	Seocheon County	Jongcheon-myeon	National Route 21 overlap
Dangjeong IS	당정 교차로	Prefectural Route 617 (Jangcheon-myeon); Chungseo-ro 302beon-gil	Seocheon County	Jongcheon-myeon	National Route 21 overlap Prefectural Route 617 overlap
Dangjeongcheon Bridge	당정천교		Seocheon County	Jongcheon-myeon	National Route 21 overlap Prefectural Route 617 overlap
Bunae IS	부내 교차로	Prefectural Route 617 (Chungseo-ro)	Seocheon County	Jongcheon-myeon	National Route 21 overlap Prefectural Route 617 overlap
Jongcheon IS	종천 교차로	Dangjeong-ro	Seocheon County	Jongcheon-myeon	National Route 21 overlap
Jongcheon Bridge	종천교		Seocheon County	Jongcheon-myeon	National Route 21 overlap
Dasa IS	다사 교차로	Chungseo-ro	Seocheon County	Jongcheon-myeon	National Route 21 overlap
Gwanri IS	관리 교차로	Chungseo-ro	Seocheon County	Biin-myeon	National Route 21 overlap
Jangpo IS	장포 교차로	Biin-ro	Seocheon County	Biin-myeon	National Route 21 overlap
No name	(이름 없음)	Seondo-gil	Seocheon County	Biin-myeon	National Route 21 overlap
Seongnae IS	성내사거리	Prefectural Route 607 (Seoin-ro); Biin-ro	Seocheon County	Biin-myeon	National Route 21 overlap
Seongbuk 1 IS	성북1 교차로	Seoin-ro 1243beon-gil	Seocheon County	Biin-myeon	National Route 21 overlap
Seongbuk Bridge	성북교		Seocheon County	Biin-myeon	National Route 21 overlap
Seongbuk 2 IS	성북2 교차로	Chungseo-ro	Seocheon County	Biin-myeon	National Route 21 overlap
Bian 1 Bridge	비인1교		Seocheon County	Biin-myeon	National Route 21 overlap
Chunjangdae IC (Chunjangdae IS)	춘장대 나들목 (춘장대 교차로)	Seohaean Expressway; Chungseo-ro	Seocheon County	Biin-myeon	National Route 21 overlap
Gubok Bridge	구복교		Seocheon County	Biin-myeon	National Route 21 overlap
Yaryong IS	야룡삼거리	Manseundong-gil	Boryeong City	Jusan-myeon	National Route 21 overlap
Jusan-myeon Office	주산면사무소		Boryeong City	Jusan-myeon	National Route 21 overlap
Geumam IS Jusan Elementary School	금암삼거리 주산초등학교	Jusanbeotkkot-ro	Boryeong City	Jusan-myeon	National Route 21 overlap
Industrial Complex IS	산업단지교차로	Boryeong Jusan Argo-Industrial Complex	Boryeong City	Jusan-myeon	National Route 21 overlap
Daechang IS	대창사거리	Prefectural Route 607 (Doksan-ro); Jangteo 6-gil	Boryeong City	Ungcheon-eup	National Route 21 overlap
Daechang Bridge	대창교		Boryeong City	Ungcheon-eup	National Route 21 overlap
Ungcheon Bridge IS	웅천교삼거리	Jangteojungang-gil	Boryeong City	Ungcheon-eup	National Route 21 overlap
Daecheon-ri IS	대천리삼거리	Prefectural Route 606 (Mansu-ro)	Boryeong City	Ungcheon-eup	National Route 21 overlap Prefectural Route 606 overlap
Muchangpo IS	무창포삼거리	Prefectural Route 606 (Muchangpo-ro)	Boryeong City	Ungcheon-eup	National Route 21 overlap Prefectural Route 606 overlap
Eupnae IS	읍내삼거리	Woljeon-ro	Boryeong City	Nampo-myeon	National Route 21 overlap
Nampo IS	남포삼거리	Boryeongnam-ro	Boryeong City	Nampo-myeon	National Route 21 overlap
Nampo IS	남포 교차로	(Connection road under construction)	Boryeong City	Nampo-myeon	National Route 21 overlap
Myeongcheon IS	명천 교차로	National Route 40 (Seongjusan-ro)	Boryeong City	Daecheon-dong	National Route 21, National Route 4 overlap
Hwasan IS	화산 교차로	National Route 21; National Route 40 (Chungseo-ro); National Route 36 (Daecheong-ro)	Boryeong City	Daecheon-dong	National Route 21, National Route 40 overlap National Route 36 overlap
Sinseol IS	신설사거리	Donghyeon-ro; Sinpyeong-ro	Boryeong City	Daecheon-dong	National Route 36 overlap
Dongdae IS	동대사거리	Boryeongbuk-ro; Hannae-ro	Boryeong City	Daecheon-dong	National Route 36 overlap
Jugong IS	주공사거리	Jugong-ro	Boryeong City	Daecheon-dong	National Route 36 overlap
Sucheong IS	수청사거리	Boryeongnam-ro; Jungang-ro	Boryeong City	Daecheon-dong	National Route 36 overlap
Gungchon IS	궁촌사거리	Hyeonchungtap-gil	Boryeong City	Daecheon-dong	National Route 36 overlap
Boryeong Public Bus Terminal (Terminal IS)	보령종합버스터미널 (터미널사거리)	Namdaecheon-ro; Myeonghae-ro	Boryeong City	Daecheon-dong	National Route 36 overlap
Daecheon station (Daecheon Station IS)	대천역 (대천역사거리)		Boryeong City	Daecheon-dong	National Route 36 overlap
Namgok IS	남곡사거리	Hwanggol-gil	Boryeong City	Daecheon-dong	National Route 36 overlap
Daecheon IC	대천 나들목	Seohaean Expressway	Boryeong City	Daecheon-dong	National Route 36 overlap
Yoam IS	요암삼거리	Dwitgol-gil	Boryeong City	Daecheon-dong	National Route 36 overlap
Haemangsan IS	해망산삼거리	Haemangsan-gil	Boryeong City	Daecheon-dong	National Route 36 overlap
Cheongryong Elementary School	청룡초등학교		Boryeong City	Daecheon-dong	National Route 36 overlap
Heukpo IS	흑포삼거리	Prefectural Route 607 (Daehae-ro)	Boryeong City	Daecheon-dong	National Route 36 overlap
Daecheonseo Middle School (Daecheon Beach Intercity Bus Stop)	대천서중학교 (대천해수욕장시외버스정류장)		Boryeong City	Daecheon-dong	National Route 36 overlap
Daecheon Harbour	대천항		Boryeong City	Daecheon-dong	National Route 36 overlap
Daecheon IS	대천 교차로		Boryeong City	Daecheon-dong	Under construction
No name	(이름 미상)		Boryeong City	Daecheon-dong	Under construction Haejeo Tunnel
No name			Boryeong City	Ocheon-myeon	Under construction Haejeo Tunnel
Jeodu IS	저두 교차로	Wonsando 3-gil	Boryeong City	Ocheon-myeon	Under construction
(Unnamed bridge)	(교량 이름 미상)		Boryeong City	Ocheon-myeon	Under construction Connecting Wonsan-do ~ Anmyeon-do
(Unnamed bridge)			Taean County	Gonam-myeon	Under construction Connecting Wonsan-do ~ Anmyeon-do
Gonam IS	고남 교차로		Taean County	Gonam-myeon	Under construction
Yeongmok Harbour	영목항		Taean County	Gonam-myeon	
Gonam-myeon Office Gonam Elementary School	고남면사무소 고남초등학교		Taean County	Gonam-myeon	
Gamnamugol IS	감나무골삼거리	Nudong-ro	Taean County	Gonam-myeon	
Nudong IS	누동삼거리	Daeya-ro	Taean County	Gonam-myeon	
Sangchon IS	상촌삼거리	Jungsin-ro	Taean County	Anmyeon-eup	
Anmyeondo Recreational Forest	안면도자연휴양림		Taean County	Anmyeon-eup	
(Seungeon 3-ri)	(승언3리)	Kkotjihaean-ro; Joeunmakteo-gil	Taean County	Anmyeon-eup	
Seungeon IS	승언삼거리	Jangteo-ro	Taean County	Anmyeon-eup	
Bangpo IS	방포사거리	Bangpo-ro	Taean County	Anmyeon-eup	
No name	(이름 없음)	Chomangsu-gil	Taean County	Anmyeon-eup	
Seungeon-ri IS	승언리 교차로	Batgae-gil	Taean County	Anmyeon-eup	
Anmyeon IS	안면삼거리	Jangteo-ro	Taean County	Anmyeon-eup	
Changgi-ri Bus Stop	창기리정류소		Taean County	Anmyeon-eup	
Changgi IS	창기삼거리	Hwangdo-ro	Taean County	Anmyeon-eup	
Baeksajang IS	백사장사거리	Baeksajang 1-gil	Taean County	Anmyeon-eup	
Yeonyukgyo IS	연육교삼거리	Deungmaru 1-gil Heukseokdong-gil	Taean County	Anmyeon-eup	
Anmyeon Bridge	안면대교		Taean County	Anmyeon-eup	
Anmyeon Bridge			Taean County	Nam-myeon	
Sinon IS	신온삼거리	Deureuni-gil	Taean County	Nam-myeon	
Gamseom IS	곰섬삼거리	Gomseom-ro	Taean County	Nam-myeon	
No name	(이름 없음)	Mageonpo-gil	Taean County	Nam-myeon	
Woncheong IS	원청사거리	Prefectural Route 96 (Cheonsuman-ro); Byeoljubu-gil	Taean County	Nam-myeon	Prefectural Route 96 overlap
Cheongpodae IS	청포대 교차로	Cheongpodae-gil	Taean County	Nam-myeon	Prefectural Route 96 overlap
Dalsanpo IS	달산포 교차로	Dalsanpo-ro	Taean County	Nam-myeon	Prefectural Route 96 overlap
Yangjam IS	양잠 교차로	Jeokdol-gil	Taean County	Nam-myeon	Prefectural Route 96 overlap
Yangjam 1 IS	양잠1 교차로	Jeokdol-gil	Taean County	Nam-myeon	Prefectural Route 96 overlap
Jjokda-ri IS	쪽다리 교차로	Nammyeon-ro	Taean County	Nam-myeon	Prefectural Route 96 overlap
Mongsanpo IS	몽산포 교차로	Nammyeon-ro; Mongsanpo-gil	Taean County	Nam-myeon	Prefectural Route 96 overlap
Samgeori IS	삼거리 교차로	Nammyeon-ro	Taean County	Nam-myeon	Prefectural Route 96 overlap
Sinjang IS	신장 교차로	Yeonkkot-gil; Uun-gil	Taean County	Nam-myeon	Prefectural Route 96 overlap
Mongsan IS	몽산 교차로	Mongdae-ro	Taean County	Nam-myeon	Prefectural Route 96 overlap
Seocho Resort (Former Namjin Elementary School)	서초휴양소 (구 남진초등학교)		Taean County	Nam-myeon	Prefectural Route 96 overlap
Namjin IS	남진 교차로	Yeonkkot-gil; Jinsan 2-gil	Taean County	Nam-myeon	Prefectural Route 96 overlap
Jinsan IS	진산 교차로	Jinsan 1-gil	Taean County	Nam-myeon	Prefectural Route 96 overlap
Jinsan 2 IS	진산2 교차로	Jinsan 1-gil	Taean County	Taean-eup	Prefectural Route 96 overlap
Namsan IS	남산 교차로		Taean County	Taean-eup	Prefectural Route 96 overlap
Songnam IS	송남 교차로	Songam-ro	Taean County	Taean-eup	Prefectural Route 96 overlap
Namsan 1 IS	남산1 교차로	Sokhaenmal-gil	Taean County	Taean-eup	Prefectural Route 96 overlap
Namsan 2 IS	남산2 교차로	Namsan 1-gil	Taean County	Taean-eup	Prefectural Route 96 overlap
Nammun IS	남문 교차로	National Route 32; Prefectural Route 96 (Seohae-ro); Hwandong-ro	Taean County	Taean-eup	Prefectural Route 96 overlap National Route 32 overlap
Pyeongcheon IS	평천 교차로	Dongbaek-ro	Taean County	Taean-eup	National Route 32 overlap
Hwadong IS	화동 교차로	Jungang-ro	Taean County	Taean-eup	National Route 32 overlap
Inpyeong IS	인평 교차로	Ganggyeongbeol-ro; Seonbi-gil	Taean County	Taean-eup	National Route 32 overlap
(Goseong IS)	(고성 교차로)	Palbong 2-ro Jinjang 3-gil	Seosan City	Palbong-myeon	National Route 32 overlap
Eosong IS	어송 교차로	Palbong 1-ro Palbong 2-ro	Seosan City	Palbong-myeon	National Route 32 overlap
Surangjae IS	수랑재 교차로	Chadong-gil; Charigangsu-gil	Seosan City	Inji-myeon	National Route 32 overlap
Hwasu IS	화수 교차로	Chàong-gil; Hwasu 2-gil Hwasuwangdae-gil	Seosan City	Inji-myeon	National Route 32 overlap
Pungjeon IS	풍전 교차로	Suhyeon-ro	Seosan City	Inji-myeon	National Route 32 overlap
Gongrim IS	공림삼거리	Prefectural Route 649 (Muhak-ro)	Seosan City	Seoknam-dong	National Route 32 overlap Prefectural Route 649 overlap
Yecheon IS	예천사거리	National Route 29; National Route 32; Prefectural Route 649 (Seohae-ro); Goun-ro	Seosan City	Seoknam-dong	National Route 29 overlap National Route 32 overlap Prefectural Route 70, 649 overlap
Galsan IS	갈산 교차로	Angyeon-ro	Seosan City	Buchun-dong	National Route 29 overlap Prefectural Route 70 overlap
Seosan Stadium	서산종합운동장	Angyeon-ro	Seosan City	Buchun-dong	National Route 29 overlap Prefectural Route 70 overlap
Ilram IS	일람사거리	Prefectural Route 634 (Hanwoldang-ro); Sayeondong-ro	Seosan City	Seongyeon-myeon	National Route 29 overlap Prefectural Route 70 overlap
Ilram IS	일람삼거리	Ramdong-gil	Seosan City	Seongyeon-myeon	National Route 29 overlap Prefectural Route 70 overlap
Osa IS	오사삼거리	Prefectural Route 643 (Seongyeon 3-ro)	Seosan City	Seongyeon-myeon	National Route 29 overlap Prefectural Route 70 overlap
No name	(이름 없음)	Mujangsaneop-ro	Seosan City	Seongyeon-myeon	National Route 29 overlap Prefectural Route 70 overlap
Jungwang IS	중왕 교차로	Wangsani-ro; Hwacheon 2-gil	Seosan City	Jigok-myeon	National Route 29 overlap Prefectural Route 70 overlap
Jigok IS	지곡 교차로	Prefectural Route 70 (Baekjesasin-ro)	Seosan City	Jigok-myeon	National Route 29 overlap Prefectural Route 70 overlap
Daeyo IS	대요 교차로	Jinchungsa-gil; Hansaeji 1-gil	Seosan City	Jigok-myeon	National Route 29 overlap
Daean Middle School	대산중학교		Seosan City	Daesan-eup	National Route 29 overlap
Daesan 1 IS	대산1교차로	Gujin-ro; Garorim-ro	Seosan City	Daesan-eup	National Route 29 overlap
Myeongji IS	명지사거리	National Route 38 (Myeongji 1-ro)	Seosan City	Daesan-eup	National Route 29, National Route 38 overlap
Hwagok IS	화곡 교차로	National Route 29 (Pyeongsin 1-ro)	Seosan City	Daesan-eup	National Route 29, National Route 38 overlap
Bangok IS	반곡 교차로	Hwagok-ro; Samgilpo 1-ro	Seosan City	Daesan-eup	National Route 38 overlap
Hwagok Tunnel	화곡터널		Seosan City	Daesan-eup	National Route 38 overlap Right tunnel: Approximately 470m Left tunnel: Approximately 395m
Samgilpo IS	삼길포 교차로	Samgilpo 1-ro Samgilpo 7-ro	Seosan City	Daesan-eup	National Route 38 overlap
Daeho Bridge	대호교		Seosan City	Daesan-eup	National Route 38 overlap
Daeho Seawall	대호방조제		Seosan City	Daesan-eup	National Route 38 overlap
Daeho Seawall			Dangjin City	Seokmun-myeon	National Route 38 overlap
Dobi-do IS	도비도 교차로	Daehoman-ro	Dangjin City	Seokmun-myeon	National Route 38 overlap
Daeho IS	대호 교차로	Chorak 2-ro	Dangjin City	Seokmun-myeon	National Route 38 overlap
Chorak IS	초락 교차로	Chorak 2-ro	Dangjin City	Seokmun-myeon	National Route 38 overlap
Sambong IS	삼봉 교차로	Prefectural Route 647 (Daeho-ro)	Dangjin City	Seokmun-myeon	National Route 38 overlap
Seokmun IS	석문 교차로	Prefectural Route 615 (Daehoman-ro)	Dangjin City	Seokmun-myeon	National Route 38 overlap
Tongjeong IS	통정 교차로	Haemyeong 1-ro	Dangjin City	Seokmun-myeon	National Route 38 overlap
(Unnamed IS)	(교차로 이름 미정)	Sandan 1-ro	Dangjin City	Seokmun-myeon	National Route 38 overlap
Saeteo IS	새터 교차로	Samhwa-gil	Dangjin City	Seokmun-myeon	National Route 38 overlap
Seokmun Bridge	석문대교		Dangjin City	Seokmun-myeon	National Route 38 overlap
Seokmun Bridge			Dangjin City	Songsan-myeon	National Route 38 overlap
Musu IS	무수 교차로	Musudeul-gil	Dangjin City	Songsan-myeon	National Route 38 overlap
Gagok IS	가곡 교차로	Prefectural Route 633 (Songsan-ro)	Dangjin City	Songsan-myeon	National Route 38 overlap
Donggok IS (Donggok Underpass)	동곡 교차로 (동곡지하차도)		Dangjin City	Songsan-myeon	National Route 38 overlap
Songsan IS	송산 교차로		Dangjin City	Songsan-myeon	National Route 38 overlap
Hyundai Steel IS (Underpass)	현대제철 교차로 (지하차도)		Dangjin City	Songak-eup	National Route 38 overlap
No name	(이름 없음)	Daeseom-gil	Dangjin City	Songak-eup	National Route 38 overlap
Godae IS	고대 교차로	Gojan-ro	Dangjin City	Songak-eup	National Route 38 overlap
Godae Industrial Complex IS	고대공단 교차로	Godaegongdan 1-gil	Dangjin City	Songak-eup	National Route 38 overlap
Hanjin IS	한진 교차로	Prefectural Route 619 (Songak-ro)	Dangjin City	Songak-eup	National Route 38 overlap
Bugok IS	부곡 교차로	Sinbogun-ro; Bugokgongdan 1-gil	Dangjin City	Songak-eup	National Route 38 overlap
Songak IC	송악 나들목	Seohaean Expressway	Dangjin City	Songak-eup	National Route 38 overlap
Beopseoki IS	법석이 교차로	Maesan-ro	Dangjin City	Sinpyeong-myeon	National Route 38 overlap
Unjeong IC	운정 나들목	National Route 34 (Seohae-ro)	Dangjin City	Sinpyeong-myeon	National Route 34, National Route 38 overlap
Unjeong IS	운정 교차로	Datgeori-gil	Dangjin City	Sinpyeong-myeon	National Route 34, National Route 38 overlap
Sapgyo Bridge	삽교대교		Dangjin City	Sinpyeong-myeon	National Route 34, National Route 38 overlap
Sapgyo IS	삽교 교차로	Sapgyocheon-gil	Dangjin City	Sinpyeong-myeon	National Route 34, National Route 38 overlap
Sapgyocheon Seawall	삽교천방조제		Dangjin City	Sinpyeong-myeon	National Route 34, National Route 38 overlap
Sapgyocheon Seawall			Asan City	Inju-myeon	National Route 34, National Route 38 overlap
Munbang IS	문방 교차로	Injisandan-ro; Asanman-ro 1578beon-gil	Asan City	Inju-myeon	National Route 34, National Route 38 overlap
Inju Industrial Complex IS	인주공단 교차로	Prefectural Route 623 (Injusandan-ro)	Asan City	Inju-myeon	National Route 34, National Route 38 overlap
Mildu IS	밀두 교차로	Hyundai-ro; Geolmae-gil	Asan City	Inju-myeon	National Route 34, National Route 38 overlap
Inju Elementary School	인주초등학교		Asan City	Inju-myeon	National Route 34, National Route 38 overlap
Gongse IS	공세 교차로	Gongse-gil	Asan City	Inju-myeon	National Route 34, National Route 38 overlap
Ipje IS (Inju Overpass)	입체 교차로 (인주육교)	National Route 34 (장영실로); National Route 39 (Asan-ro)	Asan City	Inju-myeon	National Route 34, National Route 38, National Route 39 overlap
Asanho IS	아산호 교차로	Road is under construction	Asan City	Inju-myeon	National Route 38, National Route 39 overlap
Asan Bay Seawall	아산만방조제		Asan City	Inju-myeon	National Route 38, National Route 39 overlap Continuation into Gyeonggi Province

=== Gyeonggi Province (South of Incheon) ===
Name	Hangul name	Connection	Location		Note
Asan Bay Seawall	아산만방조제	Seodongdae-ro	Pyeongtaek City	Hyeondeok-myeon	National Route 38, National Route 39 overlap South Chungcheong Province - Gyeonggi Province border line
Hyeondeok IS	현덕교차로	National Route 39 (Seohae-ro)	Pyeongtaek City	Hyeondeok-myeon	National Route 38, National Route 39 overlap South Chungcheong Province - Gyeonggi Province border line
Ugyeong IS	우경삼거리	Seodongdae-ro	Pyeongtaek City	Hyeondeok-myeon	National Route 38 overlap
Seobudu Entrance IS	서부두입구삼거리		Pyeongtaek City	Poseung-eup	National Route 38 overlap
Sinmyeong 1 IS	신명1리삼거리	Jiksandong-gil	Pyeongtaek City	Poseung-eup	National Route 38 overlap
Manho IS	만호사거리	Pyeongtaekhang-ro; Pyeongtaekhangman-gil	Pyeongtaek City	Poseung-eup	National Route 38 overlap
Poseung Middle School	포승중학교		Pyeongtaek City	Poseung-eup	National Route 38 overlap
Naegi IS	내기삼거리	National Route 38; National Route 82; Prefectural Route 82 (Poseunghyangnam-ro)	Pyeongtaek City	Poseung-eup	
East Pyeongtaek IC (East Pyeongtaek IC IS)	서평택 나들목 (서평택IC사거리)	Seohaean Expressway; Poseunggongdan-ro	Pyeongtaek City	Poseung-eup	National Route 82 overlap Prefectural Route 82 overlap
No name	(이름 없음)	Prefectural Route 309 (Poseungseo-ro)	Pyeongtaek City	Poseung-eup	National Route 82 overlap Prefectural Route 82 overlap
Wonjeong IS	원정 교차로	Pyeongtaekhang-ro	Pyeongtaek City	Poseung-eup	National Route 82 overlap Prefectural Route 82 overlap
Wonjeong IS	원정삼거리	Namyangman-ro	Pyeongtaek City	Poseung-eup	National Route 82 overlap Prefectural Route 82 overlap
Namyang Bridge	남양대교		Pyeongtaek City	Poseung-eup	National Route 82 overlap Prefectural Route 82 overlap
Namyang Bridge			Hwaseong City	Ujeong-eup	National Route 82 overlap Prefectural Route 82 overlap
Noji 1 IS	노진1사거리	Prefectural Route 302 (Namyanghwangna-ro)	Hwaseong City	Ujeong-eup	National Route 82 overlap Prefectural Route 82 overlap
Noji 2 IS	노진2사거리		Hwaseong City	Ujeong-eup	National Route 82 overlap Prefectural Route 82 overlap
Ihwa IS	이화사거리	Hwagok-ro	Hwaseong City	Ujeong-eup	National Route 82 overlap Prefectural Route 82 overlap
Seokcheon IS	석천사거리	Namyangman-ro	Hwaseong City	Ujeong-eup	National Route 82 overlap Prefectural Route 82 overlap
Bonghwa IS	봉화 교차로	Prefectural Route 82; Prefectural Route 301 (Giajadongcha-ro)	Hwaseong City	Ujeong-eup	National Route 82 overlap Prefectural Route 82 overlap
Masan IS	마산 교차로	Beodeul-ro	Hwaseong City	Ujeong-eup	National Route 82 overlap
Jukmal IS	죽말 교차로		Hwaseong City	Ujeong-eup	National Route 82 overlap
Myeoku Bridge	멱우교		Hwaseong City	Ujeong-eup	National Route 82 overlap
Myeoku IS	멱우 교차로	National Route 82 (Poseunghyangnam-ro); Prefectural Route 313 (Ssangbong-ro)	Hwaseong City	Ujeong-eup	National Route 82 overlap Prefectural Route 313 overlap
Hwasu IS	화수사거리	Prefectural Route 310 (Beodeul-ro)	Hwaseong City	Ujeong-eup	Prefectural Route 313 overlap
Gyeonggi Geriatric Hospital	경기요양병원		Hwaseong City	Ujeong-eup	Prefectural Route 313 overlap
Seokchangpogu	선창포구		Hwaseong City	Ujeong-eup	Under construction Prefectural Route 313 overlap
(Baebawi)	(배바위)		Hwaseong City	Namyang-eup	Under construction Prefectural Route 313 overlap
Changdeok 2 Overpass	장덕2육교		Hwaseong City	Namyang-eup	Prefectural Route 313 overlap
(Hyundai Motor R&D Center Entrance)	(현대자동차연구소입구)	Hyeondaeyeonguso-ro	Hwaseong City	Namyang-eup	Prefectural Route 313 overlap
Sinnam 3-ri	신남3리	Sinnam-ro	Hwaseong City	Namyang-eup	Prefectural Route 313 overlap
Hwaseong IC	화성 나들목	Capital Region 2nd Ring Expressway	Hwaseong City	Namyang-eup	Under construction Prefectural Route 313 overlap
Hwaseong Seobu Police Station	화성서부경찰서		Hwaseong City	Namyang-eup	Prefectural Route 313 overlap
Sinnam 4-ri	신남4리	Prefectural Route 318 (Sinnaman-gil)	Hwaseong City	Namyang-eup	Prefectural Route 313, 318 overlap
Taekjiap IS	택지앞 교차로	Prefectural Route 318 (Sicheong-ro); Namyang-ro	Hwaseong City	Namyang-eup	Prefectural Route 313, 318 overlap
Yeongnam Bridge	영남교		Hwaseong City	Namyang-eup	Prefectural Route 313 overlap
Namyang IS	남양 교차로	Namyangseongji-ro	Hwaseong City	Namyang-eup	Prefectural Route 313 overlap
(Gyeonggi Pharmacy)	(경기약국)	Namyangsijang-ro	Hwaseong City	Namyang-eup	Prefectural Route 313 overlap
Namyang Police Station	남양파출소	Namyangsijang-ro	Hwaseong City	Namyang-eup	Prefectural Route 313 overlap
Namyang Elementary School	남양초등학교	Namyangsijang-ro 25beon-gil	Hwaseong City	Namyang-eup	Prefectural Route 313 overlap
Sujaki IS	수작이 교차로	Prefectural Route 322 (Hwaseong-ro)	Hwaseong City	Namyang-eup	Prefectural Route 313, 322 overlap
Namyang IS	남양 교차로	Prefectural Route 313; Prefectural Route 322 (Hwaseong-ro)	Hwaseong City	Namyang-eup	Prefectural Route 313, 322 overlap
Songrim-ri	송림리	Namyang-ro	Hwaseong City	Namyang-eup	
Sambusil IS	삼부실 교차로	Namyang-ro	Hwaseong City	Namyang-eup	
(Eco-bridge)	(생태통로)		Hwaseong City	Namyang-eup	
Seoho 2 Bridge Seoho 1 Bridge Suhwa 3 Bridge	서호2교 서호1교 수화3교		Hwaseong City	Namyang-eup	
Suhwa IS	수화 교차로	Dongseo Entry Road	Hwaseong City	Namyang-eup	
Suhwa 2 Bridge	수화2교		Hwaseong City	Namyang-eup	
Munho IS	문호 교차로	Namyangseo-ro	Hwaseong City	Namyang-eup	
(Unnamed IS)	(교차로 명칭 미상)	Namyang-ro	Hwaseong City	Namyang-eup	
(Underpass)	(지하차도)	Sunoeuljungang-ro	Hwaseong City	Saesol-dong	
Songsan Bridge	송산교		Hwaseong City	Saesol-dong	
Songsan Bridge			Ansan City	Danwon District	
Choji Overpass	초지고가교	Sihwahosu-ro	Ansan City	Danwon District	
Byeolmanggoga IS	별망고가사거리	Prefectural Route 84; Prefectural Route 98 (Haean-ro); Sinansandaehak-ro	Ansan City	Danwon District	Prefectural Route 84, 98 overlap
(Daeyeon)	(대연)	Siu-ro	Ansan City	Danwon District	Prefectural Route 84, 98 overlap
(Daesung Hightech Co., Ltd.)	(대성하이피)	Sanseong-ro	Ansan City	Danwon District	Prefectural Route 84, 98 overlap
Wonsi station	원시역	Sandan-ro	Ansan City	Danwon District	Prefectural Route 84, 98 overlap
Industrial Bank IS	기업은행사거리	Moknae-ro	Ansan City	Danwon District	Prefectural Route 84, 98 overlap
Samyang Tongsang Co., Ltd. IS	삼양통상사거리	Haebong-ro	Ansan City	Danwon District	Prefectural Route 84, 98 overlap
Dolanmal Park IS	돌안말공원사거리	Seonggok-ro; Cheomdan-ro 267beon-gil	Ansan City	Danwon District	Prefectural Route 84, 98 overlap
Siheung 5 Bridge	시흥5교	Jiwon-ro	Ansan City	Danwon District	Prefectural Route 84, 98 overlap
Siheung 7 Bridge	시흥7교	Sihwa-ro; Jinheung-ro	Ansan City	Danwon District	Prefectural Route 84, 98 overlap
Sihwagongdan-gil IS	시화공단길 교차로	Sihwa-ro	Ansan City	Danwon District	Prefectural Route 84, 98 overlap
Jeongwang 7 Bridge	정왕7교		Ansan City	Danwon District	Prefectural Route 84, 98 overlap
Jeongwang 7 Bridge			Siheung City	Jeongwang-dong	Prefectural Route 84, 98 overlap
Gunja 1 Bridge	군자1교	Mayu-ro	Siheung City	Jeongwang-dong	Prefectural Route 84, 98 overlap
Okgu 7 Bridge	옥구7교	Okgucheondong-ro	Siheung City	Jeongwang-dong	Prefectural Route 84, 98 overlap
Environment Office IS	환경사업소 교차로	Prefectural Route 301 (Seohaean-ro)	Siheung City	Jeongwang-dong	Prefectural Route 84, 98 overlap
Oido Entrance IS	오이도입구 교차로	Somanggongwon-ro; Oido-ro	Siheung City	Jeongwang-dong	Prefectural Route 84, 98 overlap
Choil Paper IS	조일제지사거리	Gongdan 1-daero	Siheung City	Jeongwang-dong	Prefectural Route 84, 98 overlap
Okgu Park	옥구공원	Okgugongwon-ro	Siheung City	Jeongwang-dong	Prefectural Route 84, 98 overlap
Okgugoga IS (Okgu Overpass)	옥구고가삼거리 (옥구고가교)	Jeongwang-daero	Siheung City	Jeongwang-dong	Prefectural Route 84, 98 overlap
Seohae High School IS	서해고교삼거리	Jeongwangsingil-ro	Siheung City	Jeongwang-dong	Prefectural Route 84, 98 overlap
No name	(이름 없음)	Hamsong-ro	Siheung City	Jeongwang-dong	Prefectural Route 84, 98 overlap
Dongwon Apartment IS	동원아파트삼거리	Bonghwa-ro	Siheung City	Jeongwang-dong	Prefectural Route 84, 98 overlap
Jeongwang IC (Jeongwang IS) (Dalwol Overpass)	정왕 나들목 (정왕 교차로) (달월고가차도)	Prefectural Route 330 (3rd Gyeongin Highway)	Siheung City	Jeongwang-dong	Prefectural Route 84, 98 overlap
Wolgot Bridge IS	월곶대교삼거리	Wolgotjungang-ro	Siheung City	Wolgot-dong	Prefectural Route 84, 98 overlap
Wolgot Entrance IS	월곶입구삼거리	Seohaean-ro	Siheung City	Wolgot-dong	Prefectural Route 84, 98 overlap
Sorae Bridge IS	소래대교삼거리	Wolgothaean-ro	Siheung City	Wolgot-dong	Prefectural Route 84, 98 overlap
Sorae Bridge	소래대교		Siheung City	Wolgot-dong	Prefectural Route 84, 98 overlap Continuation into Incheon

=== Incheon ===
Name	Hangul name	Connection	Location		Note
Sorae Bridge	소래대교		Incheon	Namdong District	Prefectural Route 84, 98 overlap Gyeonggi Province - Incheon border line
(North of Sorae Bridge)	(소래대교북단)	Sorae-ro	Incheon	Namdong District	Prefectural Route 84, 98 overlap
Soraepogu	소래포구		Incheon	Namdong District	Prefectural Route 84, 98 overlap
Sorae History Museum	소래역사관	Soraeyeok-ro	Incheon	Namdong District	Prefectural Route 84, 98 overlap
No name	(이름 없음)	Nongogae-ro	Incheon	Namdong District	Prefectural Route 84, 98 overlap
Aam 2 Bridge	아암2교		Incheon	Namdong District	Prefectural Route 84, 98 overlap
No name	(이름 없음)	Nonhyeongojan-ro	Incheon	Namdong District	Prefectural Route 84, 98 overlap
Incheon Driver's License Test Center	인천운전면허시험장		Incheon	Namdong District	Prefectural Route 84, 98 overlap
No name	(이름 없음)	Prefectural Route 330 (3rd Gyeongin Highway)	Incheon	Namdong District	Prefectural Route 84, 98 overlap
(Haean Underpass)	(해안지하차도)	Incheonsinhang-daero; Hogupo-ro	Incheon	Namdong District	Prefectural Route 84, 98 overlap
No name	(이름 없음)	Prefectural Route 330 (3rd Gyeongin Highway)	Incheon	Namdong District	Prefectural Route 84, 98 overlap
(Gojan Underpass)	(고잔지하차도)	Namdong-daero; Songdobio-daero	Incheon	Namdong District	Prefectural Route 84, 98 overlap
No name	(이름 없음)	Prefectural Route 330 (3rd Gyeongin Highway)	Incheon	Namdong District	Prefectural Route 84, 98 overlap
Oeamdo IS (Songdo Underpass)	외암도사거리 (송도지하차도)	Gyeongwon-daero; Songdo Gukje-daero	Incheon	Namdong District	Prefectural Route 84, 98 overlap
Oeamdo IS (Songdo Underpass)		Gyeongwon-daero; Songdo Gukje-daero	Incheon	Yeonsu District	Prefectural Route 84, 98 overlap
(Dongchun Underpass)	(동춘지하차도)	Michuhol-daero; Convensia-daero	Incheon	Yeonsu District	Prefectural Route 84, 98 overlap
Songdo IC	송도 나들목	2nd Gyeongin Expressway	Incheon	Yeonsu District	Prefectural Route 84, 98 overlap
Songdo 3 Bridge IS	송도3교 교차로	Art center-daero Aenggogae-ro	Incheon	Yeonsu District	Prefectural Route 84, 98 overlap
Ongnyeon IC	옥련 나들목	2nd Gyeongin Expressway	Incheon	Yeonsu District	Prefectural Route 84, 98 overlap
Ungam IS	옹암 교차로	Neungheodae-ro; Biryu-daero; Seohae-daero 94beon-gil	Incheon	Yeonsu District	Prefectural Route 84, 98 overlap
Maintenance Complex Entrance IS	정비단지입구삼거리	Aam-daero 253beon-gil	Incheon	Michuhol District	Prefectural Route 84, 98 overlap
2nd Gyeongin starting point (Neunghae IC) (Neunghae Overpass)	제2경인시점 (능해 나들목) (능해고가교)	2nd Gyeongin Expressway; Chukhang-daero	Incheon	Michuhol District	Prefectural Route 84, 98 overlap
Nakseom IS	낙섬사거리	Maesohol-ro	Incheon	Michuhol District	Prefectural Route 84, 98 overlap
Incheon IC (Inha University Hospital IS) (Expressway Terminus Underpass)	인천 나들목 (인하대병원사거리) (고속종점지하차도)	Gyeongin Expressway; Inhang-ro	Incheon	Michuhol District	Prefectural Route 84, 98 overlap
Yonghyeon-dong Intercity Bus Stop CJ CheilJedang Incheon 1 Factory	용현동시외버스정류장; CJ제일제당 인천1공장		Incheon	Michuhol District	Prefectural Route 84, 98 overlap
Neungan IS	능안삼거리	Inju-daero; Seohae-daero 410beon-gil	Incheon	Michuhol District	Prefectural Route 84, 98 overlap
Singwang IS	신광사거리	National Route 42; National Route 46 (Injung-ro); Jemullyang-ro; Dowon-ro	Incheon	Jung District	National Route 42, National Route 46 overlap Prefectural Route 84, 98 overlap
Suin IS	수인사거리	Seohae-daero	Incheon	Jung District	National Route 42, National Route 46 overlap Prefectural Route 84, 98 overlap
E-mart Dong Incheon Store Incheon Commercial Girls' High School Incheon 2nd International Ferry Terminal	이마트 동인천점 인천여자상업고등학교 인천제2국제여객터미널		Incheon	Jung District	National Route 42, National Route 46 overlap Prefectural Route 84, 98 overlap
Sadong IS	사동삼거리	Uhyeon-ro	Incheon	Jung District	National Route 42, National Route 46 overlap Prefectural Route 84, 98 overlap
(1st Wharf Entrance)	(제1부두입구)	Injung-ro	Incheon	Jung District	National Route 42, National Route 46 overlap Prefectural Route 84, 98 overlap
Sinpo IS	신포사거리	Sinpo-ro; Jemullyang-ro	Incheon	Jung District	National Route 42, National Route 46 overlap Prefectural Route 84, 98 overlap
Dongincheon Registration Office	동인천등기소		Incheon	Jung District	National Route 42, National Route 46 overlap Prefectural Route 84, 98 overlap
Jung District Office Entrance	중구청입구	Jemullyang-ro 218beon-gil	Incheon	Jung District	National Route 42, National Route 46 overlap Prefectural Route 84, 98 overlap
Incheon Jungbu Police Station	인천중부경찰서		Incheon	Jung District	National Route 42, National Route 46 overlap Prefectural Route 84, 98 overlap
Incheon station (Incheon Station IS)	인천역 (인천역사거리)	Wolmi-ro; China town-ro 51beon-gil	Incheon	Jung District	National Route 42, National Route 46 overlap National Route 6 overlap Prefectural Route 84, 98 overlap
Songwol Market	송월시장	Chamoejeon-ro	Incheon	Jung District	National Route 6 overlap Prefectural Route 84, 98 overlap
Manseok Overpass	만석고가교		Incheon	Jung District	National Route 6 overlap Prefectural Route 84, 98 overlap
Manseok Overpass			Incheon	Dong District	National Route 6 overlap Prefectural Route 84, 98 overlap
Dong-il Corp. Incheon Factory Incheon Manseok Elementary School	동일방직 인천공장 인천만석초등학교		Incheon	Dong District	National Route 6 overlap Prefectural Route 84, 98 overlap
Hwasu IS	화수사거리	Injung-ro; Jemullyang-ro	Incheon	Dong District	National Route 6 overlap Prefectural Route 84, 98 overlap
Songhyeon IS	송현사거리	Prefectural Route 84 (Jungbong-daero); Songhyeon-ro	Incheon	Dong District	National Route 6 overlap Prefectural Route 84, 98 overlap
Hwanggeumgogae IS	황금고개사거리	Saetgol-ro; Injung-ro	Incheon	Dong District	National Route 6 overlap Prefectural Route 98 overlap
Seoheung Elementary School	서흥초등학교		Incheon	Dong District	National Route 6 overlap Prefectural Route 98 overlap
Songrim IS	송림오거리	Dongsan-ro; Saetgol-ro; Songrim-ro	Incheon	Dong District	National Route 6 overlap Prefectural Route 98 overlap
No name	(이름 없음)	Saecheonnyeon-ro	Incheon	Dong District	National Route 6 overlap Prefectural Route 98 overlap
Songrim IS	송림삼거리	Bongsu-daero; Injung-ro	Incheon	Dong District	National Route 6 overlap Prefectural Route 98 overlap
Songrimgogae	송림고개		Incheon	Dong District	National Route 6 overlap Prefectural Route 98 overlap
Songrimgogae			Incheon	Michuhol District	National Route 6 overlap Prefectural Route 98 overlap
Incheondae IS	인천대삼거리	Sukgol-ro	Incheon	Michuhol District	National Route 6 overlap Prefectural Route 98 overlap
Incheon Seohwa Elementary School	인천서화초등학교		Incheon	Michuhol District	National Route 6 overlap Prefectural Route 98 overlap
Gunghyeon IS	궁현사거리	Yeomjeon-ro	Incheon	Michuhol District	National Route 6 overlap Prefectural Route 98 overlap
Incheongyo IS	인천교삼거리	Janggogae-ro	Incheon	Michuhol District	National Route 6 overlap Prefectural Route 98 overlap
Donggu Public Stadium	동구구민운동장		Incheon	Michuhol District	National Route 6 overlap Prefectural Route 98 overlap
Gajwa IS (Gajwa IC IS)	가좌 나들목 (가좌IC앞 교차로)	Gyeongin Expressway; Baekbeom-ro; Janggogae-ro	Incheon	Seo District	National Route 6 overlap Prefectural Route 98 overlap
Seoknamje 2 Overpass	석남제2고가교		Incheon	Seo District	National Route 6 overlap Prefectural Route 98 overlap Pass through
Seoknamje 1 Overpass	석남제1고가교	Gilju-ro	Incheon	Seo District	National Route 6 overlap Prefectural Route 98 overlap Pass through
Yuldo Entrance IS	율도입구삼거리	Yuldo-ro	Incheon	Seo District	National Route 6 overlap Prefectural Route 98 overlap
Ruwon IS	루원 교차로	Prefectural Route 98 (Seogot-ro); Bongo-daero	Incheon	Seo District	National Route 6 overlap Prefectural Route 98 overlap
(North of Hyoseong Overpass)	(효성고가교 북단)	Bongo-daero; Cheongan-ro; Hyoseo-ro	Incheon	Gyeyang District	National Route 6 overlap
Saemal IS	새말사거리	Majang-ro	Incheon	Gyeyang District	National Route 6 overlap
Hyoseong IS	효성사거리	Annam-ro	Incheon	Gyeyang District	National Route 6 overlap
Nadeulmok IS (Bupyeong IC)	나들목사거리 (부평 나들목)	Gyeongin Expressway; Gyeyang-daero	Incheon	Gyeyang District	National Route 6 overlap
Jakjeon Overpass IS	작전고가앞 교차로	Jubuto-ro	Incheon	Gyeyang District	National Route 6 overlap
Meddeul IS	메뜰사거리	Jangje-ro	Incheon	Gyeyang District	National Route 6 overlap
Seowoon Middle School Seowoon High School	서운중학교 서운고등학교		Incheon	Gyeyang District	National Route 6 overlap
Cheonsang Bridge	천상교		Incheon	Gyeyang District	National Route 6 overlap Continuation into Gyeonggi Province

=== Gyeonggi Province Bucheon ===
Name	Hangul name	Connection	Location		Note
Cheonsang Bridge	천상교		Bucheon City	Ojeong-dong	National Route 6 overlap Incheon - Bucheon border line
Automobile Inspection Station IS	자동차검사소삼거리	Ojeong-ro 39beon-gil	Bucheon City	Ojeong-dong	National Route 6 overlap Incheon - Bucheon border line
No name	(이름 없음)	National Route 39 (Seokcheon-ro)	Bucheon City	Ojeong-dong	National Route 6, National Route 39 overlap
Saneopgil IS (Bucheon IC)	산업길사거리 (부천 나들목)	National Route 39 (Sinheung-ro)	Bucheon City	Ojeong-dong	National Route 6, National Route 39 overlap
Naechon Overpass Entrance	내촌고가입구	Bucheon-ro	Bucheon City	Ojeong-dong	National Route 6 overlap
Upyeon Mail Center IS	우편집중국삼거리	Ojeong-ro 211beon-gil	Bucheon City	Ojeong-dong	National Route 6 overlap
OBS Gyeongin TV	OBS 경인TV		Bucheon City	Ojeong-dong	National Route 6 overlap
Duksan High School	덕산고등학교	Ojeong-ro 251beon-gil Ojeong-ro 252beon-gil	Bucheon City	Ojeong-dong	National Route 6 overlap
Bongo-daero IS	봉오대로사거리	Bongo-daero	Bucheon City	Ojeong-dong	National Route 6 overlap
Daejangdong Entrance IS	대장동입구 교차로	Daejang-ro	Bucheon City	Gogang-dong	National Route 6 overlap
Asiana Airlines Entrance	아시아나항공입구		Bucheon City	Gogang-dong	National Route 6 overlap
Osoe IS	오쇠삼거리	Sosa-ro; Sosa-ro 970beon-gil	Bucheon City	Gogang-dong	National Route 6 overlap Continuation into Seoul

=== Seoul ===
Name	Hangul name	Connection	Location		Note
Osoe IS	오쇠삼거리	Sosa-ro; Sosa-ro 970beon-gil	Seoul	Gangseo District	National Route 6 overlap Gyeonggi Province - Seoul border line
Oebalsan IS	외발산사거리	Nambu Beltway; Banghwa-daero	Seoul	Gangseo District	National Route 6 overlap Gyeonggi Province - Seoul border line
Magok station IS	마곡역 교차로	National Route 48 (Gonghang-daero)	Seoul	Gangseo District	National Route 48, National Route 6 overlap
Balsan station IS	발산역 교차로	Gangseo-ro	Seoul	Gangseo District	National Route 48, National Route 6 overlap
Korea Gas Corporation KBS SPORTS WORLD	한국가스공사; KBS스포츠월드		Seoul	Gangseo District	National Route 48, National Route 6 overlap
Gangseo District Office IS	강서구청사거리	Hwagok-ro	Seoul	Gangseo District	National Route 48, National Route 6 overlap
Deungchon Middle School Seoul Baekseok Elementary School National Information Society Agency	등촌중학교 서울백석초등학교 한국정보화진흥원		Seoul	Gangseo District	National Route 48, National Route 6 overlap
Deungchon station IS	등촌역 교차로	Deungchon-ro; Gonghang-daero 59-gil	Seoul	Yangcheon District	National Route 48, National Route 6 overlap
Yeomchang station	염창역		Seoul	Yangcheon District	National Route 48, National Route 6 overlap
Yanghwa Bridge	양화교	Anyangcheon-ro; Yangcheon-ro	Seoul	Yangcheon District	National Route 48, National Route 6 overlap
Yanghwa Bridge			Seoul	Yeongdeungpo District	National Route 48, National Route 6 overlap
South of Seongsan Bridge IS	성산대교남단 교차로	National Route 1 National Route 48 (Seobu Expressway)	Seoul	Yeongdeungpo District	National Route 48, National Route 6 overlap
South of Yanghwa Bridge IS	양화대교남단 교차로	Nodeul-ro; Seonyu-ro	Seoul	Yeongdeungpo District	National Route 6 overlap
Yanghwa Bridge	양화대교		Seoul	Yeongdeungpo District	National Route 6 overlap
Yanghwa Bridge			Seoul	Mapo District	
North of Yanghwa Bridge IS	양화대교북단 교차로	National Route 6 (Yanghwa-ro); Prefectural Route 23 (Gangbyeon Expressway)	Seoul	Mapo District	National Route 6 overlap Prefectural Route 23 overlap
No name	(이름 없음)	Donggyo-ro	Seoul	Mapo District	Prefectural Route 23 overlap
North of Seongsan Bridge IS	성산대교북단 교차로	National Route 1 National Route 48 (Seobu Expressway) (Seongsan-ro); Naebu Expressway	Seoul	Mapo District	Prefectural Route 23 overlap
Nanji Park IS	난지공원 교차로	Jeungsan-ro	Seoul	Mapo District	Prefectural Route 23 overlap
Haneul Park IS	노을공원 교차로	Haneulgongwon-ro	Seoul	Mapo District	Prefectural Route 23 overlap
North of Gayang Bridge IS	가양대교북단 교차로	Gayang-daero; Hwagok-ro	Seoul	Mapo District	Prefectural Route 23 overlap Continuation into Gyeonggi Province
