= A84 =

A84 or A-84 may refer to:

- A84 motorway (France)
- A84 road, a major road in Stirling, Scotland
- Dutch Defence, in the Encyclopaedia of Chess Openings
