= Paravakar =

Paravakar Պառավաքար
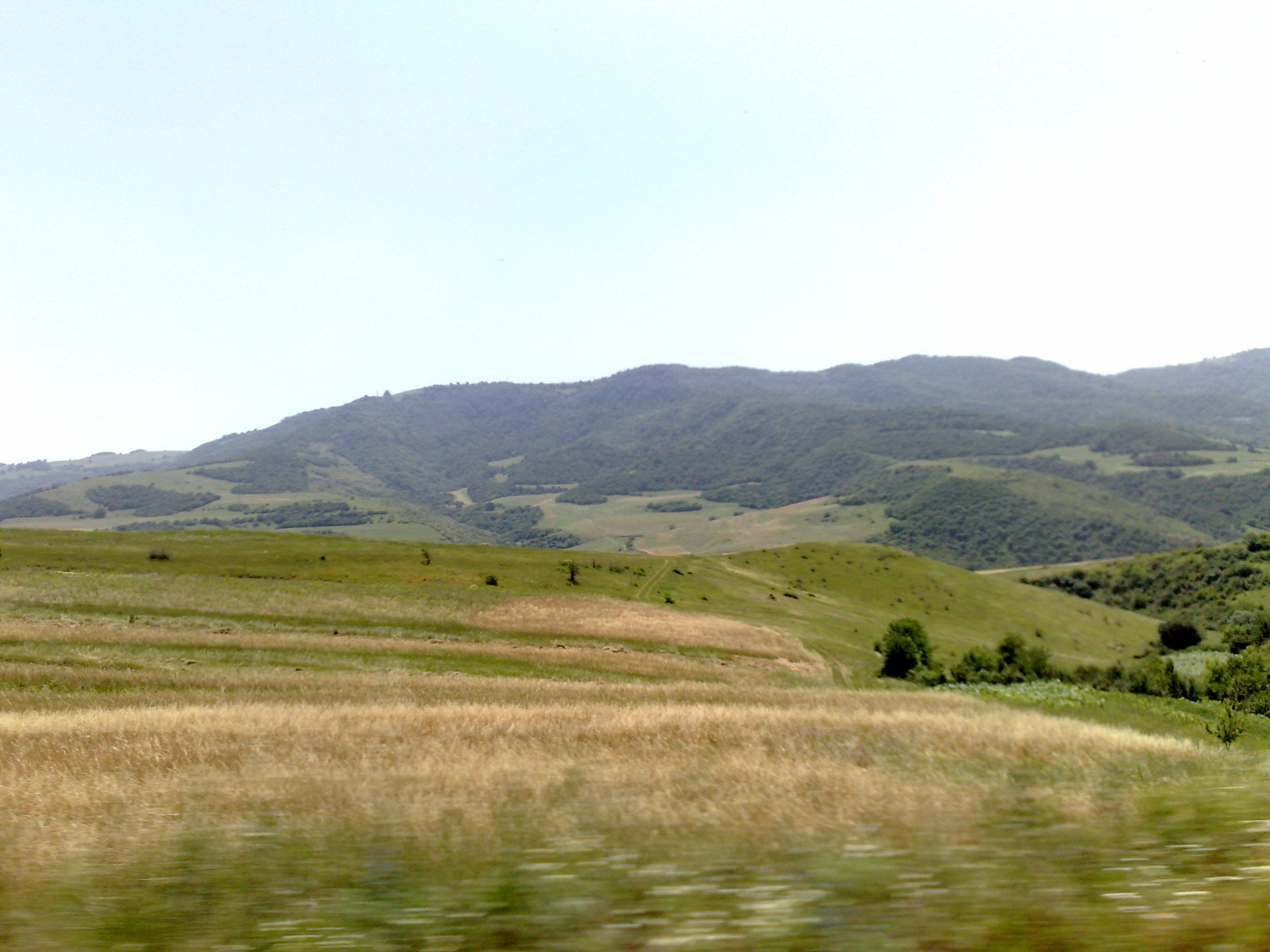
- Scenery around Paravakar

- Location within Armenia Location within Tavush
- Coordinates: 40°58′50″N 45°23′57″E
- Country: Armenia
- Province: Tavush
- Municipality: Berd

Population (2011)
  - Total: 1,464
- Time zone: UTC+4 (AMT)

Paravakar (Armenian: Պառավաքար) is a village in the Berd Municipality of the Tavush Province of Armenia.
