= Bala Cəfərli =

- Location within Azerbaijan
- Coordinates: 41°00′55″N 45°15′08″E
- Country: Azerbaijan
- District: Qazakh
- Time zone: UTC+4 (AZT)
  - Summer (DST): UTC+5 (AZT)

Bala Cəfərli (also, Bala Jafarli and Bala Jafarly) is a village in the Qazakh District of Azerbaijan.
