= Interstate 82 (Pennsylvania–New York) =

Interstate 82 (I-82) is the former designation for the following Interstate Highways between Dunmore, Pennsylvania, and New York City:

- Interstate 380 (Pennsylvania)
- Interstate 80 in Pennsylvania, east of the present junction with I-380
- Interstate 80 in New Jersey
