= A83 =

A83 or A-83 may refer to:

- A83 motorway (France), a road connecting Nantes and Niort
- A83 road (Scotland), a major road in Scotland
