= National Route 82 (South Korea) =

Highway in South Korea

National Route 82
- Pyeongtaek-Hwaseong Line 평택 - 화성선

Route information
- Length: 31.18 km (19.37 mi)
- Existed: 1 July 1996–present

Major junctions
- West end: Pyeongtaek, Gyeonggi Province
- East end: Hwaseong, Gyeonggi Province

Location
- Country: South Korea

Highway system
- Highway systems of South Korea; Expressways; National; Local

National Route 82 is a national highway in South Korea connects Pyeongtaek to Hwaseong. It established on 1 July 1996.

== Main stopovers ==
Gyeonggi Province

- Pyeongtaek - Hwaseong

== Major intersections ==
- (■): Motorway

IS: Intersection, IC: Interchange

=== Gyeonggi Province ===
Name	Hangul name	Connection	Location		Note
Naegi IS	내기삼거리	National Route 38; National Route 77 (Seodong-daero)	Pyeongtaek City	Poseung-eup	National Route 77 overlap Prefectural Route 82 overlap
East Pyeongtaek IC (East Pyeongtaek IC IS)	서평택 나들목 (서평택IC사거리)	Seohaean Expressway; Poseunggongdan-ro	Pyeongtaek City	Poseung-eup	National Route 77 overlap Prefectural Route 82 overlap
No name	(이름 없음)	Prefectural Route 309 (Poseungseo-ro)	Pyeongtaek City	Poseung-eup	National Route 77 overlap Prefectural Route 82 overlap
Wonjeong IS	원정 교차로	Pyeongtaekhang-ro	Pyeongtaek City	Poseung-eup	National Route 77 overlap Prefectural Route 82 overlap
Wonjeong IS	원정삼거리	Namyangman-ro	Pyeongtaek City	Poseung-eup	National Route 77 overlap Prefectural Route 82 overlap
Namyang Bridge	남양대교		Pyeongtaek City	Poseung-eup	National Route 77 overlap Prefectural Route 82 overlap
Namyang Bridge			Hwaseong City	Ujeong-eup	National Route 77 overlap Prefectural Route 82 overlap
Noji 1 IS	노진1사거리	Prefectural Route 302 (Namyanghwangna-ro)	Hwaseong City	Ujeong-eup	National Route 77 overlap Prefectural Route 82 overlap
Noji 2 IS	노진2사거리		Hwaseong City	Ujeong-eup	National Route 77 overlap Prefectural Route 82 overlap
Ihwa IS	이화사거리	Hwagok-ro	Hwaseong City	Ujeong-eup	National Route 77 overlap Prefectural Route 82 overlap
Seokcheon IS	석천사거리	Namyangman-ro	Hwaseong City	Ujeong-eup	National Route 77 overlap Prefectural Route 82 overlap
Bonghwa IS	봉화 교차로	Prefectural Route 82; Prefectural Route 301 (Giajadongcha-ro)	Hwaseong City	Ujeong-eup	National Route 77 overlap Prefectural Route 82 overlap
Masan IS	마산 교차로	Beodeul-ro	Hwaseong City	Ujeong-eup	National Route 77 overlap
Jukmal IS	죽말 교차로		Hwaseong City	Ujeong-eup	National Route 77 overlap
Myeoku Bridge	멱우교		Hwaseong City	Ujeong-eup	National Route 77 overlap
Myeoku IS	멱우 교차로	National Route 77; Prefectural Route 313 (Ssangbong-ro)	Hwaseong City	Ujeong-eup	National Route 77 overlap
Geumui IS	금의 교차로	Prefectural Route 310 (Beodeul-ro)	Hwaseong City	Ujeong-eup	
Joam IC (Joam IS)	조암 나들목 (조암 교차로)	Pyeongtaek-Siheung Expressway; Prefectural Route 310 (Beodeul-ro)	Hwaseong City	Jangan-myeon	
Seogeun IS	서근 교차로	Prefectural Route 310 (Beodeul-ro)	Hwaseong City	Paltan-myeon	
Deoku IS	덕우 교차로	Oncheon-ro 165beon-gil	Hwaseong City	Paltan-myeon	
Dongbang Bridge	동방대교		Hwaseong City	Paltan-myeon	
Deokcheon IS	덕천 교차로	Dongmak-gil	Hwaseong City	Paltan-myeon	
Yulam IS	율암 교차로	National Route 39 (Seohae-ro)	Hwaseong City	Paltan-myeon	
Gujang IS	구장 교차로	Madangbawi-ro	Hwaseong City	Paltan-myeon	
Gajae IS	가재 교차로	National Route 43 (Samcheonbyeongma-ro)	Hwaseong City	Paltan-myeon	
Doi IS	도이 교차로	Prefectural Route 82 (Pureundeulpan-ro)	Hwaseong City	Hyangnam-eup	
Hyangnam IS	향남 교차로	National Route 43 (Eunhaengnamu-ro)	Hwaseong City	Hyangnam-eup	
Hagil IS	하길 교차로	Jeyakdanji-ro	Hwaseong City	Hyangnam-eup	
No name	(이름 미상)	Prefectural Route 306 (Amsogogae-ro)	Hwaseong City	Yanggam-myeon	
Yodang IS	요당 교차로	National Route 39 (Seohae-ro)	Hwaseong City	Yanggam-myeon	
Under construction (Will be extended to Anjung-eup)
