= Local Route 78 (South Korea) =

Road in South Korea

State-Funded Local Highway 78
- 국가지원지방도 제78호선
- Gimpo-Pocheon Line 김포 ~ 포천선

Route information
- Length: 165.3 km (102.7 mi)
- Existed: 25 August 2001–present

Major junctions
- West end: Wolgot-myeon, Gimpo
- East end: Idong-myeon, Pocheon, Gyeonggi Province

Location
- Country: South Korea

Highway system
- Highway systems of South Korea; Expressways; National; Local

Local Route 78 Gimpo–Pocheon Line (Korean: 국가지원지방도 제78호선 김포 ~ 포천선) is a local route of South Korea that connecting Wolgot-myeon, Gimpo to Pocheon, Gyeonggi Province.

== History ==
This route was established on 25 August 2001.

== Stopovers ==
Gyeonggi Province

- Gimpo

Seoul

- Gangseo District

Gyeonggi Province

- Goyang - Paju - Yeoncheon County - Pocheon

== Major intersections ==
- (■): Motorway

IS: Intersection, IC: Interchange

=== Gimpo · Seoul ===
Name	Hangul name	Connection	Location		Note
Seongdong Village Entrance IS	성동마을입구 교차로	National Route 48 (Gimpo-daero)	Gimpo City	Wolgot-myeon	Terminus
Seongdong Bridge Munsusanseong Fortress Munsu Elementary School (Closed)	성동교 문수산성 문수초등학교(폐교)		Gimpo City	Wolgot-myeon	
Yonggang-ri	용강리		Gimpo City	Wolgot-myeon	
Planning			Gimpo City	Wolgot-myeon	Under construction
Planning			Gimpo City	Haseong-myeon	Under construction
Seoktan-ri	석탄리	Prefectural Route 56	Gimpo City	Haseong-myeon	Under construction
Jeonryu-ri	전류리	Wolha-ro	Gimpo City	Haseong-myeon	
Bongseong-ri IS	봉성리 교차로	Bongseong-ro	Gimpo City	Haseong-myeon	
Nusansumun	누산수문		Gimpo City	Yangchon-eup	
Unyang IS	운양삼거리	Prefectural Route 356 (Yanggok-ro)	Gimpo City	Unyang-dong	
(Unyang)	(운양)	Gimpohangang-ro	Gimpo City	Unyang-dong	
(Gimpo Hangang New Town)	(한강신도시)		Gimpo City	Unyang-dong	Planned road
Narae Underpass	나래지하차도 동단	Gimpohangang-ro	Gimpo City	Unyang-dong	
Gimpo Hangang New Town IC	김포한강신도시 나들목	Gimpohangang 1-ro Gimpo-daero 1216beon-gil	Gimpo City	Unyang-dong	
Geumpo Bridge Bangsumun IS	금포교 방수문삼거리		Gimpo City	Unyang-dong	
Sinhyang IS	신향삼거리	Gamam-ro	Gimpo City	Unyang-dong	
No name	(이름 없음)	Hongdopyeong-ro	Gimpo City	Unyang-dong	
Jongdalsae Village IS	종달새마을 교차로	Geumpa-ro 213beon-gil	Gimpo City	Gochon-eup	
Yeongsajeong Entrance IS	영사정입구 교차로	Eunhaengyeongsajeong-ro	Gimpo City	Gochon-eup	
Yeongsa Bridge	영사대교		Gimpo City	Gochon-eup	
Jeonho IC	전호 나들목	Gimpohangang-ro; Arayuk-ro	Gimpo City	Gochon-eup	
Jeonho Bridge	전호교		Gimpo City	Gochon-eup	
No name	(이름 없음)	Prefectural Route 92 (Gaehwadong-ro)	Seoul	Gangseo District	National Route 39 overlap
Gaehwa IC	개화 나들목	National Route 39 (Beolmal-ro); Seoul City Route 88 (Olympic-daero); Gimpohangang-ro	Seoul	Gangseo District	National Route 39 overlap
Haengju Bridge	행주대교		Seoul	Gangseo District	National Route 39 overlap Continuation into Gyeonggi Province

=== Gyeonggi Province (North of Seoul) ===
Name	Hangul name	Connection	Location		Note
Haengju Bridge	행주대교		Goyang City	Deokyang District	National Route 39 overlap Seoul - Gyeonggi Province border line
Haengju Bridge IC	행주대교 나들목	National Route 77 (Jayu-ro)	Goyang City	Deokyang District	National Route 39 overlap
Haengjugoga IS	행주고가 교차로	Haengsin-ro; Haengju-ro	Goyang City	Deokyang District	National Route 39 overlap
Neunggok Overpass IS	능곡육교앞 교차로	Hosu-ro	Goyang City	Deokyang District	National Route 39 overlap
Todang Overpass IS	토당육교 교차로	Jungang-ro; Jido-ro	Goyang City	Deokyang District	National Route 39 overlap
Hwajung High School IS (Hwajung High School)	화정고교앞삼거리 (화정고등학교)	Hwajeong-ro	Goyang City	Deokyang District	National Route 39 overlap
Myeongji Hospital	명지병원		Goyang City	Deokyang District	National Route 39 overlap
Goyang SPART Complex & Park	고양어울림누리		Goyang City	Deokyang District	National Route 39 overlap
Eoullimma-eul IS	어울림마을앞 교차로	Prefectural Route 356 (Goyang-daero)	Goyang City	Deokyang District	National Route 39 overlap
Seongsa Underpass Entrance IS	성사지하차도입구 교차로	Masang-ro	Goyang City	Deokyang District	National Route 39 overlap
No name	(이름 없음)	Chungjang-ro	Goyang City	Deokyang District	National Route 39 overlap
Nakta Pass IS	낙타고개삼거리	Wondang-ro	Goyang City	Deokyang District	National Route 39 overlap
Daeja IS	대자삼거리	National Route 1 (Tongil-ro)	Goyang City	Deokyang District	National Route 39 overlap
Byeokje Station	벽제역		Goyang City	Deokyang District	National Route 39 overlap
Goyang-dong Community Center	고양동주민센터		Goyang City	Deokyang District	National Route 39 overlap
Goyang 2 Bridge IS	고양2교앞 교차로	National Route 39 (Hoguk-ro)	Goyang City	Deokyang District	National Route 39 overlap
Goyang 2 Bridge	고양2교		Goyang City	Deokyang District	
Goyang-dong IS	고양동사거리	Dongheon-ro; Hyeeum-ro	Goyang City	Deokyang District	
Goyang 3 Bridge	고양3교		Goyang City	Deokyang District	
Byeokje IS	벽제삼거리	Prefectural Route 367 (Bogwang-ro)	Goyang City	Deokyang District	
Olympic CC	올림픽CC		Goyang City	Deokyang District	
Hyeeumryeong	혜음령		Goyang City	Deokyang District	
Hyeeumryeong			Paju City	Gwangtan-dong	
Seo Seoul CC	서서울CC		Paju City	Gwangtan-dong	
Yongma-ri	용미리	Prefectural Route 98 (Myeongbongsan-ro)	Paju City	Gwangtan-dong	
Yongmi-ri Buddha Stone Statue Hanmin High School Yun Kwan Tomb Gwangtan-myeon Office	용미리 석불입상 한민고등학교 윤관장군묘 광탄면사무소		Paju City	Gwangtan-dong	
Sinsan IS	신산 교차로	Manjangsan-ro	Paju City	Gwangtan-dong	
No name	(이름 없음)	Simgung-ro	Paju City	Gwangtan-dong	
(Gwangtan Post Office)	(광탄우체국)	Donggeori-gil	Paju City	Gwangtan-dong	
Gwangtan IS	광탄삼거리	Hyeeum-ro	Paju City	Gwangtan-dong	
Gwangsin Bridge	광신교		Paju City	Gwangtan-dong	
Gwangtan IS	광탄 교차로	Prefectural Route 56 (Paju-ro)	Paju City	Gwangtan-dong	Prefectural Route 56 overlap
Osan 2 ISS (Osan Underpass)	오산2 교차로 (오산지하차도)	Dangjaebong-ro; Deungwon-ro	Paju City	Jori-eup	Prefectural Route 56 overlap
Osan 1 IS	오산1 교차로	Deungwon-ro 330beon-gil	Paju City	Jori-eup	Prefectural Route 56 overlap
Osan Bridge	오산교		Paju City	Jori-eup	Prefectural Route 56 overlap
Noejo IS	뇌조 교차로	Prefectural Route 56 (Paju-ro)	Paju City	Jori-eup	Prefectural Route 56 overlap
Noejo-ri IS	뇌조리사거리	Deungwon-ro	Paju City	Jori-eup	
Yeongtaejae	영태재		Paju City	Wollong-myeon	
Juwol Bridge	주월교		Paju City	Wollong-myeon	
Juwol Bridge			Paju City	Paju-eup	
Juwol Bridge	주월교 북단	Prefectural Route 360 (Gwangtancheon-ro)	Paju City	Paju-eup	
Bugok Bridge	부곡교		Paju City	Paju-eup	
No name	(이름 없음)	Surihol-ro	Paju City	Paju-eup	
(Paju Nonghyup Warehouse)	(파주농협 자재창고)	Ugye-ro	Paju City	Paju-eup	
Paju Elementary School IS	파주초등학교앞 교차로	Ugye-ro 53beon-gil	Paju City	Paju-eup	
Junae IS	주내삼거리	Pabal-ro; Hyanggyomal-gil	Paju City	Paju-eup	
Beomil IS	범일 교차로		Paju City	Paju-eup	
Seonyu Industrial Complex	선유일반산업단지	Donyu-ro	Paju City	Paju-eup	
Munsan Sueok Middle School Munsan Sueok High School	문산수억중학교 문산수억고등학교		Paju City	Paju-eup	
Munsan Girl's Middle & High School IS	문산여중고앞 교차로	Chunghyeon-ro	Paju City	Paju-eup	
Junge Bridge	중에교		Paju City	Paju-eup	
Junge Bridge			Paju City	Munsan-eup	
KT Munsan Branch Roundabout	KT 문산지점앞 회전교차로	Prefectural Route 364 (Ugye-ro)	Paju City	Munsan-eup	Prefectural Route 364 overlap
Munsan-dong Elementary School IS	문산동초교앞 교차로	Seonyuul 3-gil	Paju City	Munsan-eup	Prefectural Route 364 overlap
Dokseo IS	독서삼거리	Jangseungbaegi-ro	Paju City	Munsan-eup	Prefectural Route 364 overlap
(Bridge) Jeonji ROKA Training Center	(교량) 전진신병교육대		Paju City	Munsan-eup	Prefectural Route 364 overlap
Bangmi Bridge	방미교	Baemeori-gil	Paju City	Munsan-eup	Prefectural Route 364 overlap
Bangmi Bridge		Baemeori-gil	Paju City	Beobwon-eup	Prefectural Route 364 overlap
Gaya Land	가야랜드		Paju City	Beobwon-eup	Prefectural Route 364 overlap
Beobwon IS	법원사거리	Prefectural Route 56; Prefectural Route 367 (Saimdang-ro) (Surihol-ro)	Paju City	Beobwon-eup	Prefectural Route 364, 367 overlap
E-mart Beobwon Store Bubwon Elementary School Geumgok Pass Geumgok Elementary School (Closed) Geumgok Bridge	이마트에브리데이 법원점 법원초등학교 금곡고개 금곡초등학교(폐교) 금곡교		Paju City	Beobwon-eup	Prefectural Route 367 overlap
Geumgok IS	금곡삼거리	Papyeongsan-ro	Paju City	Beobwon-eup	Prefectural Route 367 overlap
Gomsi Pass Ungdam Police Station Ungdam Post Office Ungdam Elementary School Tiger CC	곰시고개 웅담치안센터 웅담우체국 웅담초등학교 타이거CC		Paju City	Beobwon-eup	Prefectural Route 367 overlap
(East of Mugeon Bridge)	(무건교 서단)	Mulpurenamu-gil	Paju City	Papyeong-myeon	Prefectural Route 367 overlap
Maji 2 Bridge	마지2교		Paju City	Papyeong-myeon	Prefectural Route 367 overlap
Maji 2 Bridge			Paju City	Jeokseong-myeon	Prefectural Route 367 overlap
Sikhyeon IS	식현사거리	Cheongsong-ro	Paju City	Jeokseong-myeon	Prefectural Route 367 overlap
Sikhyeon Bridge	식현교		Paju City	Jeokseong-myeon	Prefectural Route 367 overlap
Jeokseo Elementary School	적서초등학교	Jeokseochogyo-gil	Paju City	Jeokseong-myeon	Prefectural Route 367 overlap
Duji IS	두지사거리	Surihol-ro 2316beon-gil	Paju City	Jeokseong-myeon	Prefectural Route 367 overlap
Duji IS	두지 교차로 (두지삼거리)	National Route 37 (Yulgok-ro)	Paju City	Jeokseong-myeon	Prefectural Route 367 overlap
Jeokseong IS	적성 교차로	Soldwi-ro	Paju City	Jeokseong-myeon	Prefectural Route 367 overlap
Jangnam Bridge	장남교		Paju City	Jeokseong-myeon	Prefectural Route 367 overlap
Jangnam Bridge			Yeoncheon County	Jangnam-myeon	Prefectural Route 367 overlap
Jangnam IS	장남 교차로	Surihol-ro; Jangbaek-ro 54beon-gil	Yeoncheon County	Jangnam-myeon	Prefectural Route 367 overlap
(Jangnam Office Entrance)	(장남면사무소 입구)	Jangbaek-ro	Yeoncheon County	Jangnam-myeon	Prefectural Route 367 overlap
Panbu-ri	판부리	Prefectural Route 372 (Jangnam-ro)	Yeoncheon County	Jangnam-myeon	Prefectural Route 367, 372 overlap
Samicheon Bridge	사미천교		Yeoncheon County	Jangnam-myeon	Prefectural Route 372 overlap
Samicheon Bridge			Yeoncheon County	Baekhak-myeon	Prefectural Route 372 overlap
Ducheon Bridge	두천교		Yeoncheon County	Baekhak-myeon	Prefectural Route 372 overlap
Duil-ri	두일리	Duil-ro	Yeoncheon County	Baekhak-myeon	Prefectural Route 372 overlap
Yanghoe Bridge	양회교		Yeoncheon County	Baekhak-myeon	Prefectural Route 372 overlap
(Baekhak Gas Station)	(백학주유소)	Prefectural Route 371 (Cheongjeong-ro)	Yeoncheon County	Baekhak-myeon	Prefectural Route 371, 372 overlap
Baekhak-myeon Office	백학면사무소		Yeoncheon County	Baekhak-myeon	Prefectural Route 371, 372 overlap
Baekhak-myeon Office IS	백학면사무소사거리	Dubaek-ro; Baekhak-ro	Yeoncheon County	Baekhak-myeon	Prefectural Route 371, 372 overlap
Baekhak Bridge	백학교	Prefectural Route 372 (Cheongjeong-ro)	Yeoncheon County	Baekhak-myeon	Prefectural Route 371, 372 overlap
Dongjung-ri	동중리	Wangsan-ro	Yeoncheon County	Wangjing-myeon	Prefectural Route 371 overlap
(North of Dongjung Bridge)	(동중교 북단)	Baekdong-ro	Yeoncheon County	Wangjing-myeon	Prefectural Route 371 overlap
Buksam-ri	북삼리	Prefectural Route 371	Yeoncheon County	Wangjing-myeon	Prefectural Route 371 overlap
Buksam IS	북삼삼거리	Buksam-ro	Yeoncheon County	Wangjing-myeon	
Buksam Bridge	북삼교		Yeoncheon County	Wangjing-myeon	
Buksam Bridge			Yeoncheon County	Gunnam-myeon	
Gunnam IS	군남사거리	Gunnam-ro; Samwang-ro	Yeoncheon County	Gunnam-myeon	
Gunnam Bridge	군남교		Yeoncheon County	Gunnam-myeon	
Mirae Pass	미래고개		Yeoncheon County	Gunnam-myeon	
Mirae Pass			Yeoncheon County	Yeoncheon-eup	
Sinmang-ri IS	신망리삼거리	Sangri-ro	Yeoncheon County	Yeoncheon-eup	
Sangri IS	상리삼거리	National Route 3 (Yeonsin-ro)	Yeoncheon County	Yeoncheon-eup	National Route 3 overlap
Hyeonga IS	현가삼거리	Yeoncheon-ro	Yeoncheon County	Yeoncheon-eup	National Route 3 overlap
Civic Stadium IS	공설운동장삼거리	Munhwa-ro	Yeoncheon County	Yeoncheon-eup	National Route 3 overlap
Joheung Apartment IS	조흥아파트삼거리	Yeoncheonyeok-ro	Yeoncheon County	Yeoncheon-eup	National Route 3 overlap
'Yeoncheon IS	연천 교차로	Under construction	Yeoncheon County	Yeoncheon-eup	National Route 3 overlap
Yeoncheon Bridge	연천대교		Yeoncheon County	Yeoncheon-eup	National Route 3 overlap
Dongmak IS	동막사거리	Dongnae-ro; Yeoncheon-ro 42beon-gil	Yeoncheon County	Yeoncheon-eup	National Route 3 overlap
Yeoncheon Entrance IS	연천진입삼거리	Yeoncheon-ro	Yeoncheon County	Yeoncheon-eup	National Route 3 overlap
Tonghyeon IS	통현삼거리	National Route 3 (Pyeonghwa-ro)	Yeoncheon County	Yeoncheon-eup	National Route 3 overlap
Nambaemi Pass Chilpal Bridge Gomun-ri Clinic	남배미고개 칠팔교 고문리보건진료소		Yeoncheon County	Yeoncheon-eup	
Gomun-ri IS	고문리삼거리	Cheongyeon-ro	Yeoncheon County	Yeoncheon-eup	
Yeoncheon Elementary School Gomun Branch Hantangang Dam	연천초등학교 고문분교 한탄강댐		Yeoncheon County	Yeoncheon-eup	
Bugok-ri	부곡리		Yeoncheon County	Yeoncheon-eup	Under construction
Jung-ri	중리		Pocheon City	Gwanin-myeon	Under construction
Hyangrocheon 1 Bridge	향로천1교		Pocheon City	Gwanin-myeon	
Jungri IS	중리 교차로	National Route 87 (Hantangang 2-ro)	Pocheon City	Gwanin-myeon	National Route 87 overlap
Samyul-ri Bridge	삼율리교		Pocheon City	Gwanin-myeon	National Route 87 overlap
Samyul IS	삼율 교차로	National Route 87 (Changdong-ro)	Pocheon City	Gwanin-myeon	National Route 87 overlap
Samyul-ri	삼율리	Changdong-ro	Pocheon City	Gwanin-myeon	
Daehoesan Bridge	대회산교		Pocheon City	Gwanin-myeon	
Daehoesan Bridge			Pocheon City	Yeongbuk-myeon	
Hantangang Wild Flower Park	한탄강야생화공원		Pocheon City	Yeongbuk-myeon	
Daehoesan 1 IS	대회산1 교차로	Banggol-gil	Pocheon City	Yeongbuk-myeon	
No name	(이름 없음)	Sohoesan-gil	Pocheon City	Yeongbuk-myeon	
Uncheon 2 IS	'운천제2 교차로	National Route 43 (Hoguk-ro)	Pocheon City	Yeongbuk-myeon	
(Daean Gas Station)	(대안가스충전소)	Yeongbuk-ro	Pocheon City	Yeongbuk-myeon	
Munam Bridge	문암교		Pocheon City	Yeongbuk-myeon	
Munam IS	문암삼거리	Yeongbuk-ro	Pocheon City	Yeongbuk-myeon	
Sanjeong 1 Bridge Sanjeong 2 Bridge Sanjeong 3 Bridge Hosu Bridge Sanjeong Lake Camping Site	산정1교 산정2교 산정3교 호수교 산정호수캠핑장		Pocheon City	Yeongbuk-myeon	
No name	(이름 없음)	Prefectural Route 387 (Saenang-ro)	Pocheon City	Yeongbuk-myeon	Prefectural Route 387 overlap
Gyeonggi-do Peace Training Institute	경기도평화교육연수원		Pocheon City	Yeongbuk-myeon	Prefectural Route 387 overlap
No name	(이름 없음)	Prefectural Route 387 (Sanjeonghosu-ro)	Pocheon City	Yeongbuk-myeon	Prefectural Route 387 overlap
Yeou Pass	여우고개		Pocheon City	Yeongbuk-myeon	
Yeou Pass			Pocheon City	Idong-myeon	
Yeoujae IS (Idong IS)	여우재삼거리 (이동 교차로)	National Route 47 (Geumgang-ro)	Pocheon City	Idong-myeon	
1st Dopyeong Bridge (north-side)	제1도평교 북단	Prefectural Route 372 (Hwadong-ro)	Pocheon City	Idong-myeon	Terminus

== See also ==
- Roads and expressways in South Korea
- Transportation in South Korea
