= Jayu-ro =

Highway in South Korea

Jayu-ro
- Jayu Motorway 자유로

Route information
- Length: 49.967 km (31.048 mi)
- Existed: 1992–present

Major junctions
- South end: Gayang Bridge, Mapo, Seoul
- Seoul Ring Expressway; Incheon Airport Expressway; Suwon-Munsan Expressway; National Route 39; National Route 37
- North end: Jayu Interchange, Paju, Gyeonggi

Location
- Country: South Korea

Highway system
- Highway systems of South Korea; Expressways; National; Local

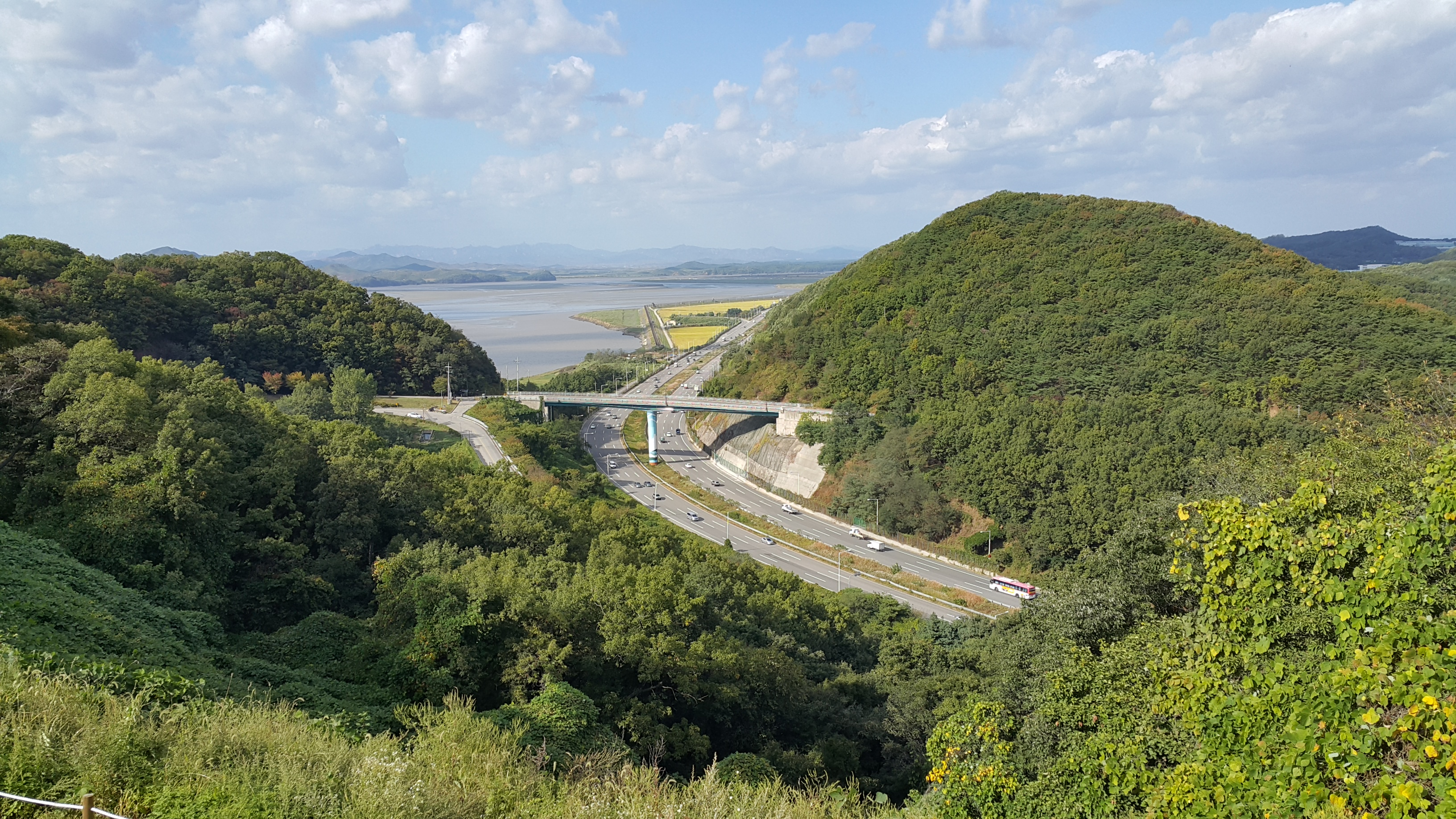
Jayuro northbound as viewed from Odusan Observatory. North Korea is visible in the center upper-left portion

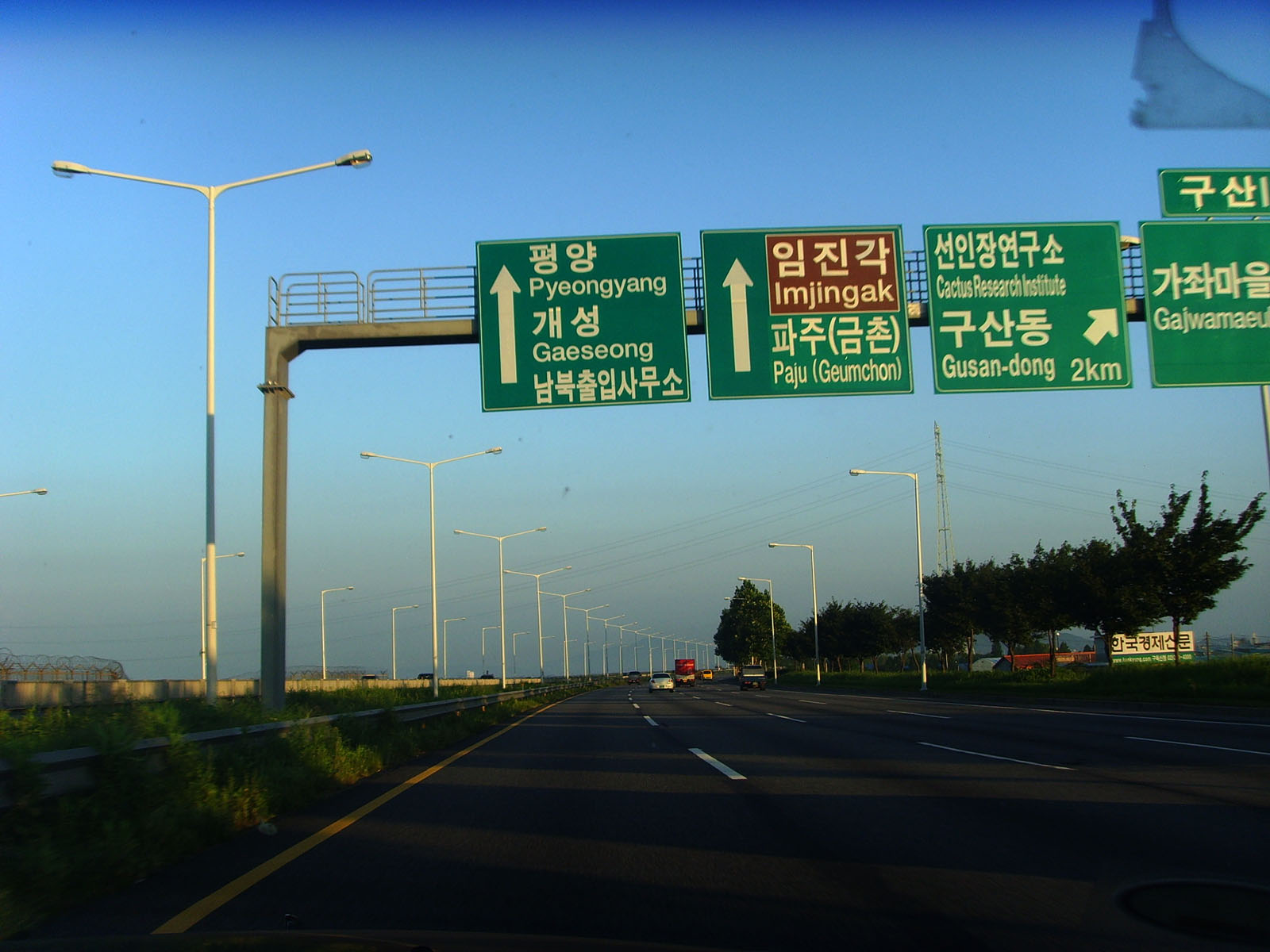
Gusan IC, 2008

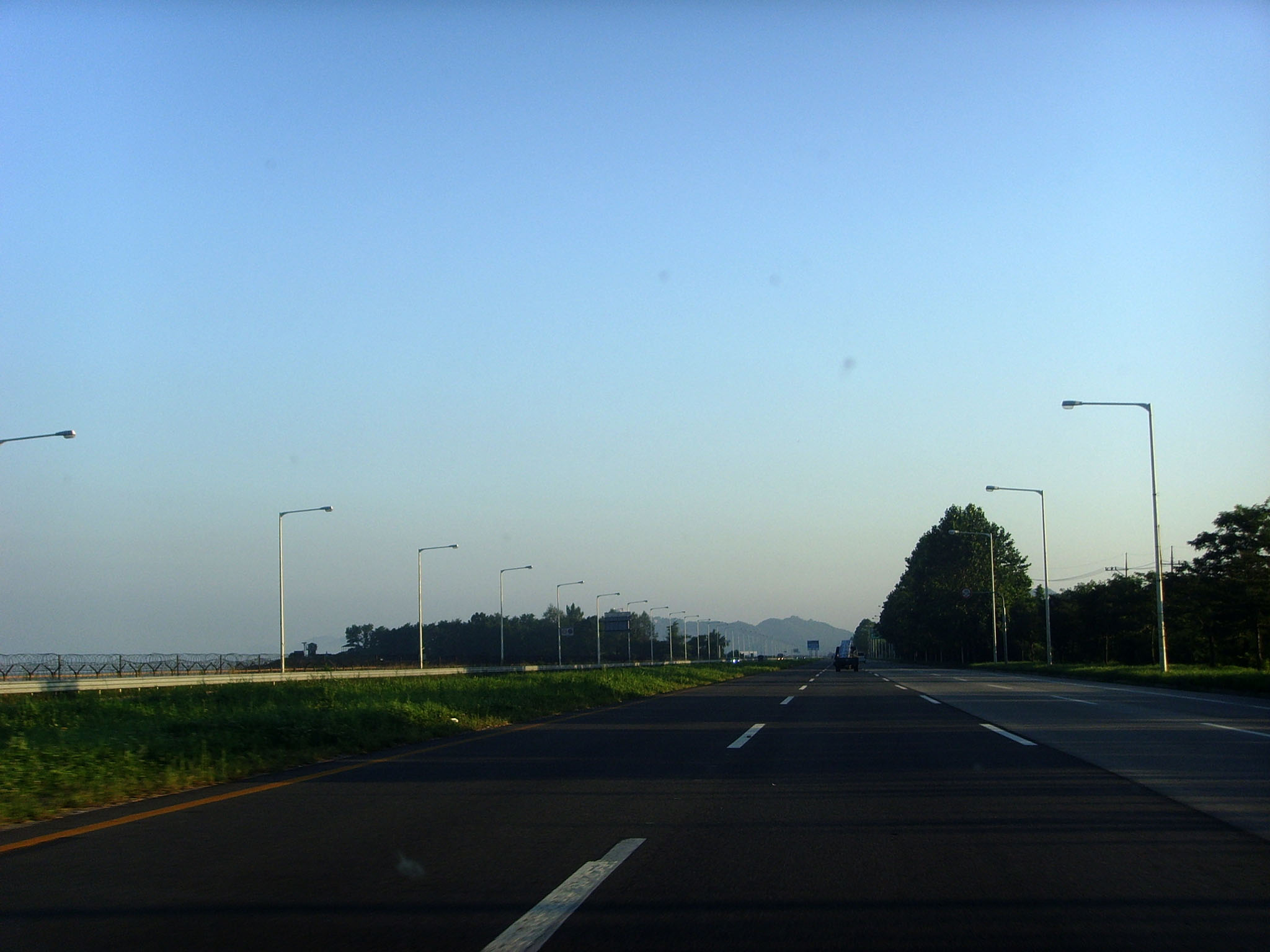
Bound for Gaeseong, 2008

The Jayu Motorway (also called Jayu-ro, Korean: 자유로, lit. Freedom Road) is a major north–south arterial highway in South Korea. Its southern terminus is in Seoul, while its northern terminus is at National Route 1's Reunification Bridge leading into the DMZ. North Korea is visible from a section of the highway stretching from Seongdong-ri to Ogeum-ri. Its shape closely parallels the northern bank of the Han River and is heavily fortified with barbed wire and military observatories. It is part of National Route 77.

This route connects Seoul (Gayang Bridge), Goyang (Ilsan) to Paju (Munsan, Panmunjeom), with a total length of 49.976 km (31.054 mi).

The highway is directly connected with the Gangbyeonbuk-ro at Gayang Bridge.

== History ==
- May 19, 1990 - Construction Begin
- August, 1992 - Haengju Bridge~Tongil observatory section(29 km) opens to traffic.
- September, 1994 - Tongil observatory~Jayu Bridge(자유의다리) section(17.5 km) opens to traffic.

== Compositions ==
=== Lanes ===
- Dangdong IC ~ Jayu IC: 4
- Nakha IC - Dangdong IC: 6
- Nakha IC - Isanpo JC: 8
- Gayang Bridge - Isanpo JC: 10

=== Length ===
49.976 km (31.054 mi)

=== Speed limits ===
- 90 km/h

== List of facilities ==
- IC: Interchange, JC: Junction, SA: Service Area, TG:Tollgate

No.	Name	Korean name	Hanja name	Connections	Notes	Location	
Connected directly with Gangbyeonbuk-ro(강변북로)
6	Gayang Br. IC	가양대교북단	加陽大橋	Gayang-daero (가양대로); Hwagok-ro(화곡로)	Highway Start Spot	Mapo	Seoul
5	S. Goyang IC	남고양나들목	南高陽나들목	Suwon-Munsan Expressway (Branch Line)		Goyang	Gyeonggi
1	Bungno JC (Banghwa Bridge)	북로분기점	北路分岐點	Suwon-Munsan Expressway; Incheon Airport Expressway		Goyang	Gyeonggi
IC	Haengju IC	행주나들목	幸州나들목	Haengju-ro (행주로)	Seoul-bound Only	Goyang	Gyeonggi
JC	Haengju JC (Haengju Bridge)	행주분기점	幸州分岐點	National Route 39; KTX Haengsin station		Goyang	Gyeonggi
JC	Jayuro JC (Gimpo Bridge)	자유로분기점	自由路分岐點	Seoul Ring Expressway		Goyang	Gyeonggi
IC	Janghang IC	장항나들목	獐項나들목	Baengma-ro (백마로); Ilsan Lake Park		Goyang	Gyeonggi
IC	KINTEX IC	킨텍스나들목	KINTEX나들목	KINTEX-ro (킨텍스로); KINTEX		Goyang	Gyeonggi
JC	Isanpo JC (Ilsan Bridge)	이산포분기점	二山浦分岐點	Provincial Route 98; Goyang Stadium; Daehwa Station		Goyang	Gyeonggi
IC	Gusan IC	구산나들목	九山나들목	Provincial Route 356		Goyang	Gyeonggi
IC	Jangwol IC	장월나들목	長月나들목	Provincial Route 358; Paju Book City		Goyang	Gyeonggi
IC	Munbal IC	문발나들목	文發나들목	Provincial Route 56		Paju	Gyeonggi
IC	Seongdong IC	성동나들목	城洞나들목	Provincial Route 360		Paju	Gyeonggi
IC	Nakha IC	낙하나들목	洛下나들목	Provincial Route 366		Paju	Gyeonggi
IC	Naepo IC	내포나들목	內浦나들목	Suwon-Munsan Expressway		Paju	Gyeonggi
IC	Dangdong IC	당동나들목	堂洞나들목	National Route 37		Paju	Gyeonggi
IC	Imjingak IC	임진각나들목	任津閣나들목	Imjingak; Imjingak Station		Paju	Gyeonggi
IC	Jayu IC	자유나들목	自由나들목	National Route 1 (Tongil-ro / 통일로); Panmunjeom; Kaesong Industrial Region; Reunification Highway		Paju	Gyeonggi

== Jayuro Ghost ==
The highway is also notable for its variant of the vanishing hitchhiker called the Jayuro Ghost. The area frequently experiences foggy weather and thus has a high rate of automobile collisions. According to the narrative, a woman can sometimes be seen along the side of the road wearing sunglasses. Upon closer inspection it is revealed that the so-called sunglasses are actually the woman's gouged-out eyes. Another version of the narrative has a driver picking up the ghost, only for the ghost to direct the driver to a cemetery or disappear when the driver reaches the destination. The Dark Side of Seoul Podcast released a video episode about this urban legend and other road-related Korean folklore.

== See also ==
- List of streets in Seoul
- Olympicdaero
- Gimpo Hangang Highway
