= Gayang-daero =

Seoul Special Metropolitan City Route 53
- 서울특별시도 제53호선
- Gayang-daero 가양대로

Route information
- Length: 2.2 km (1.4 mi)

Major junctions
- From: Mapo District, Seoul
- To: Eunpyeong District, Seoul

Location
- Country: South Korea

Highway system
- Highway systems of South Korea; Expressways; National; Local

Gayang-daero (Korean: 가양대로) is a road located in Gyeonggi Province and Seoul, South Korea. With a total length of 2.2 km (1.4 mi), this road starts from the Gayang Bridge Interchange in Mapo District, Seoul to Susaek Bridge Intersection in Eunpyeong District.

== Stopovers ==
Seoul

- Mapo District

Gyeonggi Province

- Goyang

Seoul

- Mapo District - Eunpyeong District

== List of facilities ==
- Note
  - IC : Interchange (나들목)
  - IS : Intersection (평면 교차로)
  - BUS : Bus Stop (버스 정류장)
  - BR : Bridge (교량)
- The route marker only available in Seoul area.

Type	Name	Hangul name	Connection	Location			Note
Connected with Hwagok-ro
IC	Gayang Bridge (North side)	가양대교북단	Hwagok-ro; National Route 77 (Jayu-ro, Gangbyeonbuk-ro); Local Route 23 (Gangbyeonbuk-ro); Seoul City Route 70 (Gangbyeonbuk-ro)	Seoul	Mapo District	Sangam-dong	
IS	Guryong IS	구룡사거리	World Cup-ro; Local Route 357 (2nd Jayu-ro)	Gyeonggi	Goyang Deogyang District	Daedeok-dong	
BUS	Sangam Garage	상암차고지		Seoul	Mapo District	Sangam-dong	All directions (14-820) (14-821)
BUS	World Cup Park 7 Complex	월드컵파크7단지		Seoul	Mapo District	Sangam-dong	All directions (14-271), (14-817) (14-272), (14-818)
IS	World Cup Park 7 Complex IS	월드컵파크7단지사거리	World Cup buk-ro	Seoul	Mapo District	Sangam-dong	
BUS	Sangam DMC Entrance	상암DMC입구		Seoul	Mapo District	Sangam-dong	Susaek Bridge direction (14-290)
IS	DMC Cheongdam Industry Center IS	DMC첨단산업센터삼거리	Seongam-ro	Seoul	Mapo District	Sangam-dong	
BUS	DMC Cheongdam Industry Center	DMC첨단산업센터		Seoul	Mapo District	Sangam-dong	All directions (14-111) (14-112)
IS	Guryong-gil	구룡길		Seoul	Mapo District	Sangam-dong	
BR	Susaek Bridge	수색교		Seoul	Mapo District	Sangam-dong	
BR	Susaek Bridge			Seoul	Eunpyeong District	Susaek-dong	
IS	Susaek Bridge IS	수색교삼거리	Seoul City Route 50 (Susaek-ro)	Seoul	Eunpyeong District	Susaek-dong	
