= Osan–Hwaseong Expressway =

Road in South Korea

Expressway No.171

Route information
- Length: 2.55 km (1.58 mi)
- Existed: October 29, 2009–present

Major junctions
- East end: Osan, Gyeonggi-do
- West end: Hwaseong, Gyeonggi-do

Location
- Country: South Korea
- Major cities: Hwaseong, Osan

Highway system
- Highway systems of South Korea; Expressways; National; Local

The Osan–Hwaseong Expressway (Korean: 오산화성고속도로; Hanja: 烏山華城高速道路; part of Expressway 171) is an expressway in South Korea that runs between Osan and Hwaseong. Established on October 29, 2009, it is the shortest expressway in South Korea with a length of 2.55 kilometers (1.58 miles). It shares its expressway number with Yongin-Seoul Expressway. However, they are not connected.

== History ==
On January 3, 2008, the name was changed from Pyeongtaek-Hwaseong Expressway to Expressway No. 171 Osan–Hwaseong Expressway. On October 29, 2009, all routes were started through the West Osan Junction- Annyeong Tollgate.

== Features ==
- Lanes: 6
- Length: 2.55 km (1.58 miles)
- Speed limit: 100 km/h

== List of facilities ==
- IC: Interchange, JC: Junction, SA: Service Area, TG: Tollgate

| No. | Name | Korean name | Hanja name | Connections | Notes | Location |
|---|---|---|---|---|---|---|
| 6 | W.Osan JC | 서오산 분기점 | 西烏山分岐點 | Pyeongtaek-Hwaseong Expressway, Capital Region 2nd Belt Expressway | JC | Osan, Gyeonggi |
| 7 | W.Osan TG | 서오산 요금소 | 西烏山料金所 | - | TG | Osan, Gyeonggi |
| 8 | Annyeong IC | 안녕 나들목 | 安寧 | National Route 1, National Route 43, Local Route 84, Local Route 315 | IC | Hwaseong, Gyeonggi |
