= Yongin–Seoul Expressway =

South Korean expressway connecting Yongin, Gyeonggi and Gangnam-gu, Seoul

Expressway No.171
- Kyeong-su Expressway

Route information
- Length: 22.9 km (14.2 mi)
- Existed: July 1, 2009–present

Major junctions
- South end: Yongin, Gyeonggi
- North end: Gangnam-gu, Seoul

Location
- Country: South Korea

Highway system
- Highway systems of South Korea; Expressways; National; Local

- Yongin–Seoul Expressway
- Hangul: 용인서울고속도로
- Hanja: 龍仁서울高速道路
- RR: Yongin Seoul gosok doro
- MR: Yongin Sŏul kosok toro

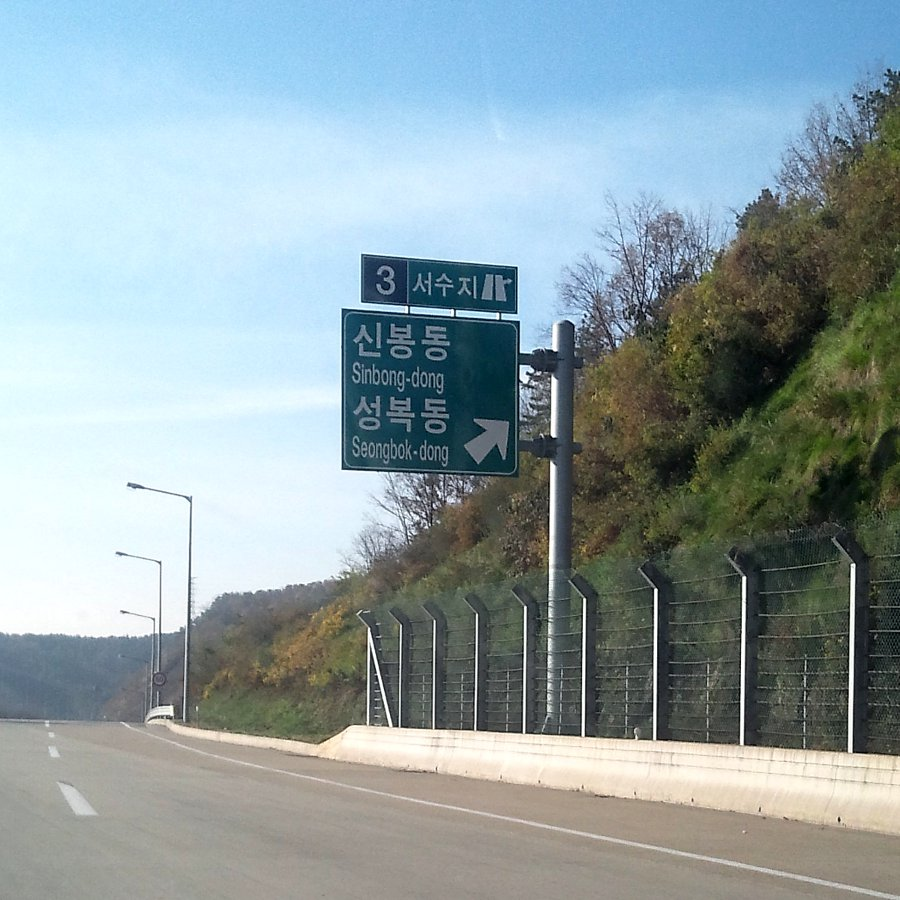
W. Suji IC

Yongin–Seoul Expressway (Korean: 용인서울고속도로; part of Expressway 171) is an expressway in South Korea, connecting Yongin, Gyeonggi and Gangnam-gu, Seoul. Informally known as the Gyeongsu Expressway (경수고속도로), it is the only expressway in South Korea not directly connected to another expressway. (Note: Gwanggyo-Sanghyun IC connects to Yeongdong Expressway via other roads, but not directly.) (Note: Gyeongbu Expressway and this expressway meets in Seongnam City, but there is no direct connection.) Although it shares the same designation number, it is not directly connected to Osan-Hwaseong Expressway either. Plans have been made to connect the Busan side of Gyeongbu Expressway and Yongin-side Geumto Tollgate.

== History ==
The Yongin-Seoul Expressway (a part of National Highway No. 171) is a highway in South Korea that connects Yongin-si, Gyeonggi-do to Seocho-gu, Seoul. It has the same route number as the Osan Hwaseong Expressway, but is not directly connected. There are currently no rest areas on the entire route.

The expressway was designed to reduce traffic on the Gyeongbu Expressway with the expansion of Southern Gyeonggi. Construction started in October 2005, and was completed on July 1, 2009. The opening ceremony occurred on 30 June 2009, with Gyeonggi governor Kim Mun-su in attendance. The expressway has been open to traffic since midnight on July 1 (KST). It was built to order and is operated by Kyeongsu Expressway Corporation for 30 years. 1.5 trillion won was spent to build this expressway, with Kyeongsu Expressway Corp investing 570 billion won.

== Timeline ==
- 16 September 2002: Proposal for BTO was submitted.
- 23 December 2003: Kyeong-su Expressway Corp established.
- 3 November 2004: Expressway number 141 is assigned for Yongin–Seoul Expressway.
- 20 May 2005: Groundbreaking ceremony occurred.
- 31 October 2005: Construction started for Heungdeok IC ~ Heonneung IC.
- 3 January 2008: Expressway number 171 is reassigned.
- 30 June 2009: Establishing ceremony occurred in Geumto Tollgate.
- 1 July 2009: Heungdeok IC ~ Heonneung IC established.

== Toll ==
Yongin–Seoul Expressway was built and is operated by a private investment company. The toll collection system is different from how Korea Expressway collects tolls. Toll fees were originally 1,800 won, but later raised to 2,000 won. 1,100 won is collected at W. Suji Tollgate, and 900 Won is collected at Geumto Tollgate. Traffic from Heungdeok interchange and Gwanggyo-Sanghyeon interchange leaving W. Suji Tollgate pay an additional 600 won. The same applies for vehicles entering W. Suji in the direction of Heungdeok.

== Composition ==
Lanes

- Godeung IC ~ Heonneung IC: 4 lanes
- Heungdeok IC ~ Godeung IC: 6 lanes

Length

- 22.9 Km

Speed limit

- All area Max. 100 km/h

== List of facilities ==
- Number stands for IC and JC number, TG stands for Tollgate, SA for Service Area.

Number	Name	Korean name	Hanja name	Length between each other	Length	Connection	Place			Note
Connected with Regional road no.311
Connected with Osan-Hwaseong Expressway through Bongyeong-ro
1	Heungdeok	흥덕 나들목	興德	-	0.00	National Route 42, Local Route 98; Local Route 311; Bongyeong-ro	Gyeonggi Province	Yongin		Direct connection with Local Route 311.
2	Gwanggyo-Sanghyeon	광교상현 나들목	光敎上峴	3.20	3.20	National Route 43 (Yeongdong Expressway) (Note: Connected with National Route 43)	Gyeonggi Province	Suwon		Entrance/exit to Yongin is disallowed
3	W. Suji	서수지나들목	西水枝	2.10	5.30		Gyeonggi Province	Yongin		Entrance on Yongin direction and exit on Seoul direction will pay on W. Suji TG.
TG	W. Suji TG	서수지요금소	西水枝料金所				Gyeonggi Province	Yongin		Main Tollgate
4	W.Bundang (Gogi)	서분당 (고기)	西盆唐 (古基)	5.07	10.37	Local Route 334	Gyeonggi Province	Yongin		
5	W.Pangyo	서판교	西板橋	2.83	13.20	Local Route 84	Gyeonggi Province	Seongnam		
TG	Geumto TG	금토요금소	金土料金所				Gyeonggi Province	Seongnam		Main Tollgate
5-1	Geumto JC	금토 분기점	金土分岐點			Gyeongbu Expressway	Gyeonggi Province	Seongnam		
6	Godeung	고등나들목	高登	4.12	17.32	Local Route 23; Cheonggyesan-ro	Gyeonggi Province	Seongnam		Entrance and exit on Seoul direction is disallowed
7	Heolleung	헌릉나들목	獻陵	4.96	22.28	Seoul City Route 41 (Heolleung-ro)	Seoul	Seocho-gu	Gangnam-gu	
	Seoul Endpoint			0.62	22.90		Seoul	Seocho-gu	Gangnam-gu	

== See also ==
- Pyeongtaek-Hwaseong Expressway
- Osan-Hwaseong Expressway
