= Expressway 17 (South Korea) =

- Iksan–Pyeongtaek Expressway : Iksan, North Jeolla – Pyeongtaek, Gyeonggi
- Pyeongtaek–Paju Expressway : Pyeongtaek, Gyeonggi – Paju, Gyeonggi
  - Pyeongtaek–Hwaseong Expressway : Pyeongtaek, Gyeonggi – Hwaseong, Gyeonggi
  - Suwon–Munsan Expressway : Hwaseong, Gyeonggi – Paju, Gyeonggi
