= Incheon International Airport Expressway =

Road in South Korea

Expressway No.130
- Incheon International Airport Expressway

Route information
- Length: 36.55 km (22.71 mi)
- Existed: 2001–present

Major junctions
- West end: Gonghang Newtown JC in Jung-gu, Incheon; 2nd Gyeongin Expressway
- East end: Buk-ro JC in Goyang, Gyeonggi Province; National Route 77; Suwon-Munsan Expressway

Location
- Country: South Korea

Highway system
- Highway systems of South Korea; Expressways; National; Local

- Incheon International Airport Expressway
- Hangul: 인천국제공항고속도로
- Hanja: 仁川國際空航高速道路
- RR: Incheon gukjegonghang gosok doro
- MR: Inch'ŏn kukchegonghang kosok toro

The Incheon International Airport Expressway (Korean: 인천국제공항고속도로, Incheon Gukje Gonghang Gosok Doro) is an expressway in South Korea connecting Incheon International Airport to Goyang, Gyeonggi.

== History ==
- December 1995: Construction Begin.
- 20 November 2001: Opens to traffic.
- 27 June 2013: Cheongna IC opens to traffic.

== Composition ==
=== Lanes ===
- 6-8 Lanes

=== Length ===
- 36.55 km

=== Speed Limit ===
- 100 km/h

== List of facilities ==
- IC: Interchange, JC: Junction, SA: Service Area, TG:Tollgate

No.	Name	Korean name	Hanja name	Connections	Notes	Location
Connected directly to Airport-dong-ro
	Yongyu/Muui	인천 시점	仁川 始點	Yeongjonghaeannam-ro; Airport-dong-ro		Yeongjong-gu, Incheon
	Sinbul IC	신불나들목	新佛나들목	Airport-dong-ro		Yeongjong-gu, Incheon
	Incheon Airport begin					Yeongjong-gu, Incheon
1	Airport New Town JC	공항신도시분기점	空港新都市分岐點	2nd Gyeongin Expressway (Expressway Route 110) (Incheon Grand Bridge)		Yeongjong-gu, Incheon
2	Airport Entrance JC	공항입구나들목	空港入口나들목	Yeongjonghaeanbuk-ro		Yeongjong-gu, Incheon
3	Geumsan IC	금산나들목	錦山나들목			Yeongjong-gu, Incheon
4-1	Hansang IC			Hansangjungang-ro		Yeongjong-gu, Incheon
SA	Yeongjong Bridge SA	영종대교기념관	永宗大橋紀念館			Seohae-gu, Incheon
TG	Incheon Airport TG	인천공항 요금소	仁川空港料金所		Main tollgate Former New Airport TG	Seohae-gu, Incheon
5	Cheongna IC	청라나들목	菁蘿나들목	Bongsu-daero		Seohae-gu, Incheon
6	No-oji JC	노오지분기점	老梧地分岐點	Capital Region First Ring Expressway (Expressway Route 100)		Gyeyang-gu, Incheon
7	Gimpo Airport IC	김포공항나들목	金浦空港	National Route 39; National Route 48		Gimpo, Gyeonggi-do
8	88 JC	88 분기점	88分岐點	Olympic-daero (Seoul City Route 88)		Gangseo-gu, Seoul
9	Buk-ro JC	북로분기점	北路分岐點	Pyeongtaek–Paju Expressway (Expressway Route 17); National Route 77 (Jayu-ro)	Expressway End	Goyang, Gyeonggi-do
Connected directly to the Pyeongtaek–Paju Expressway

== Gallery ==
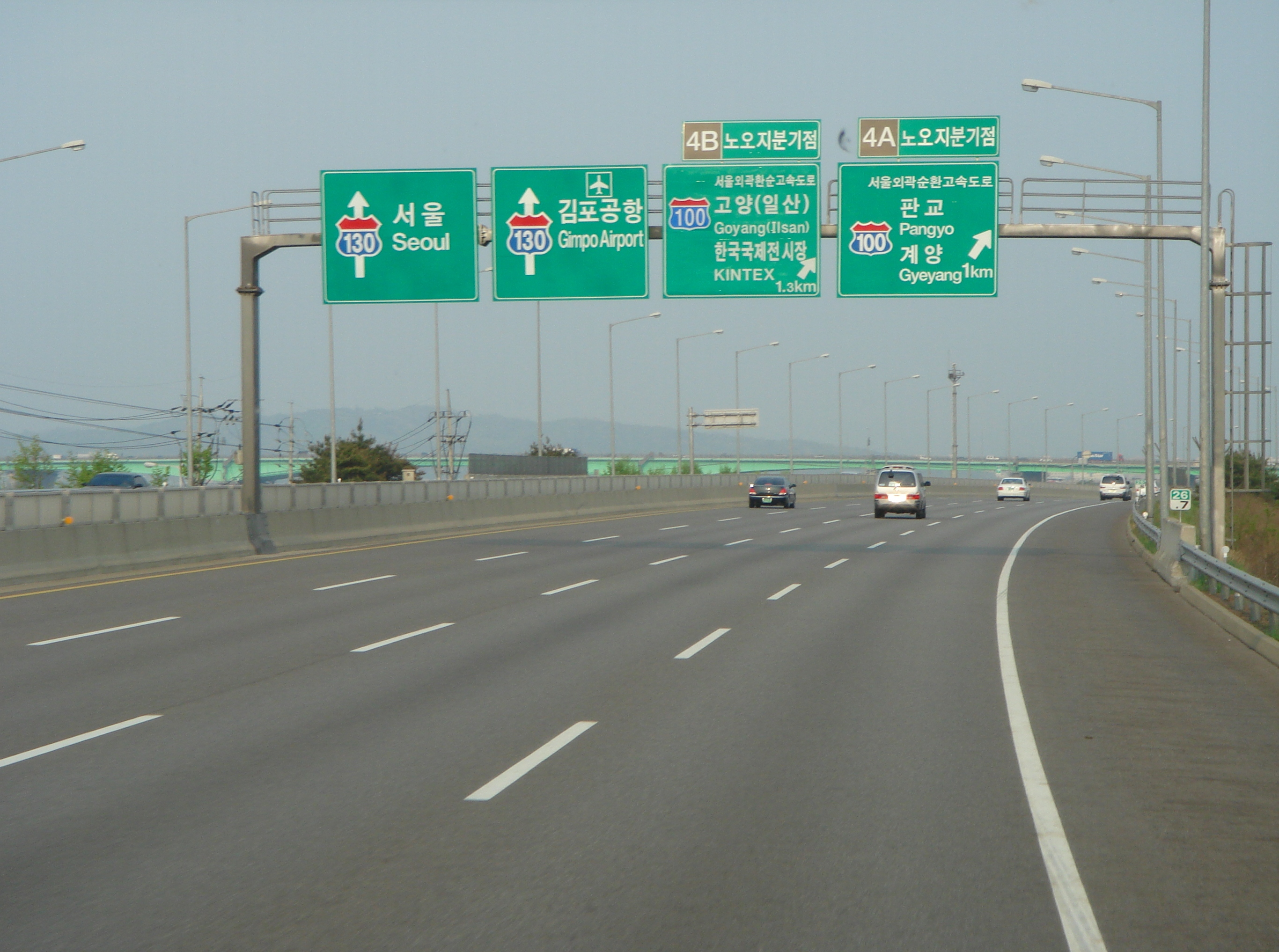
Nooji JC

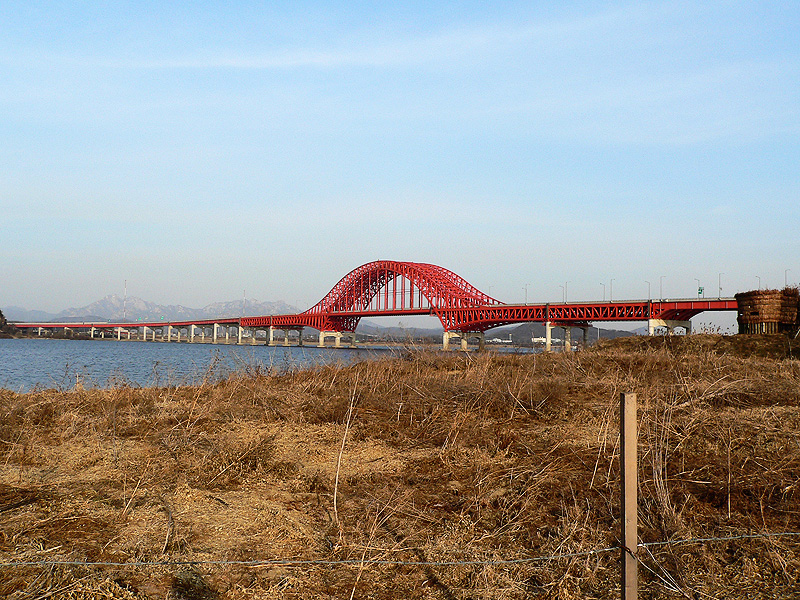
Banghwa Bridge

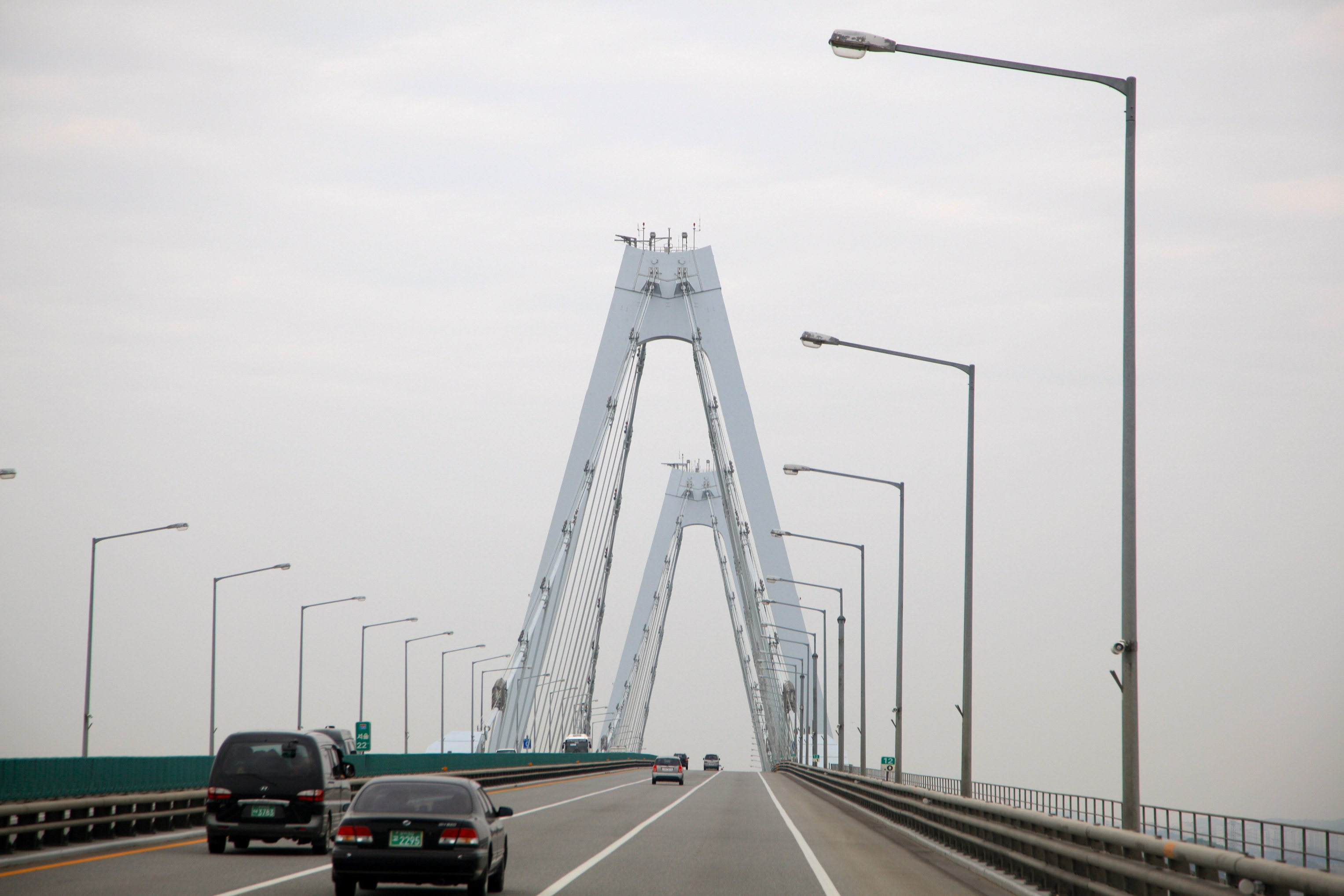
Yeongjong Bridge

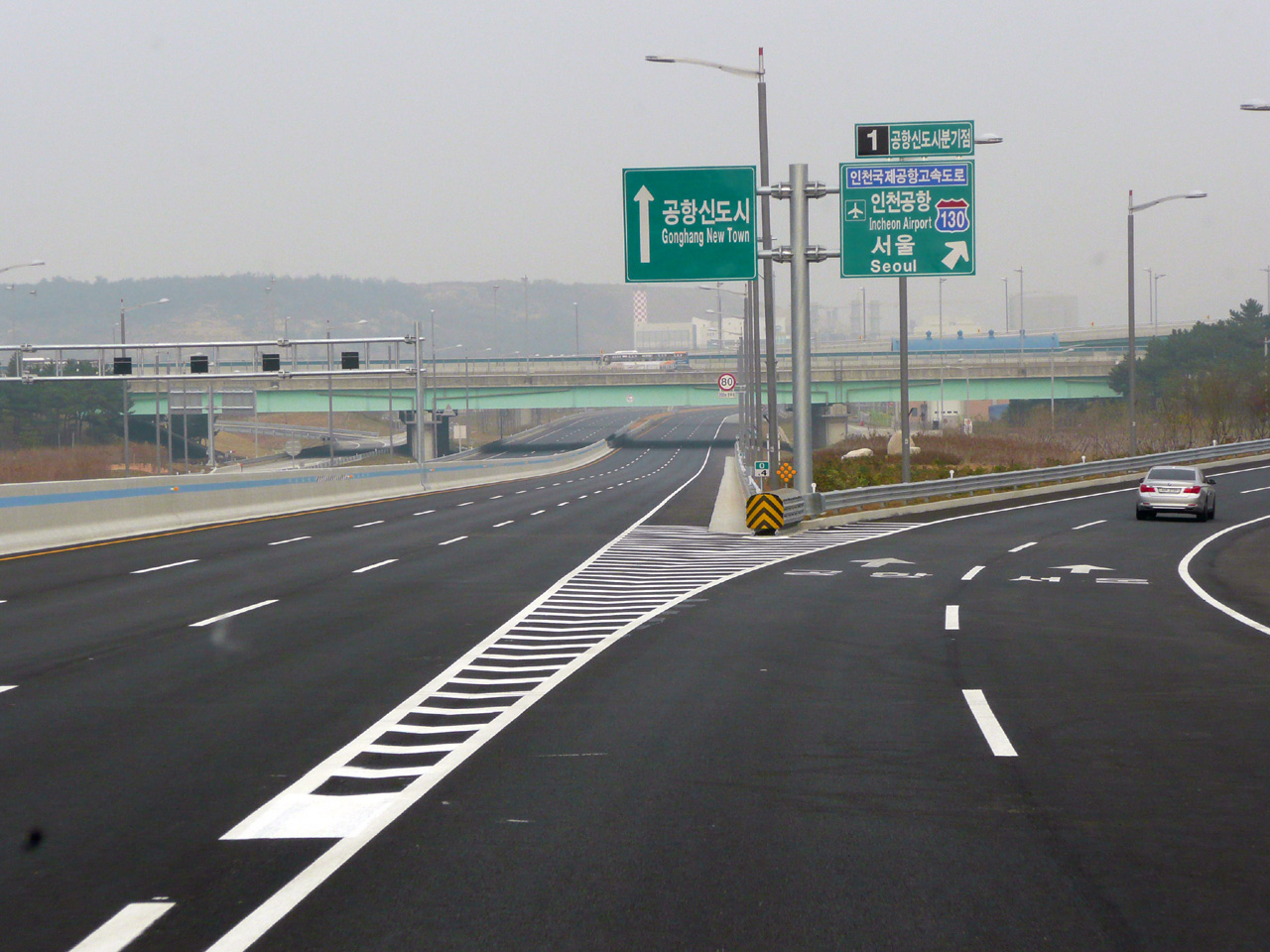
Airport Town Square JC
