= Haengjusanseong =

Ancient fortress in Goyang, South Korea

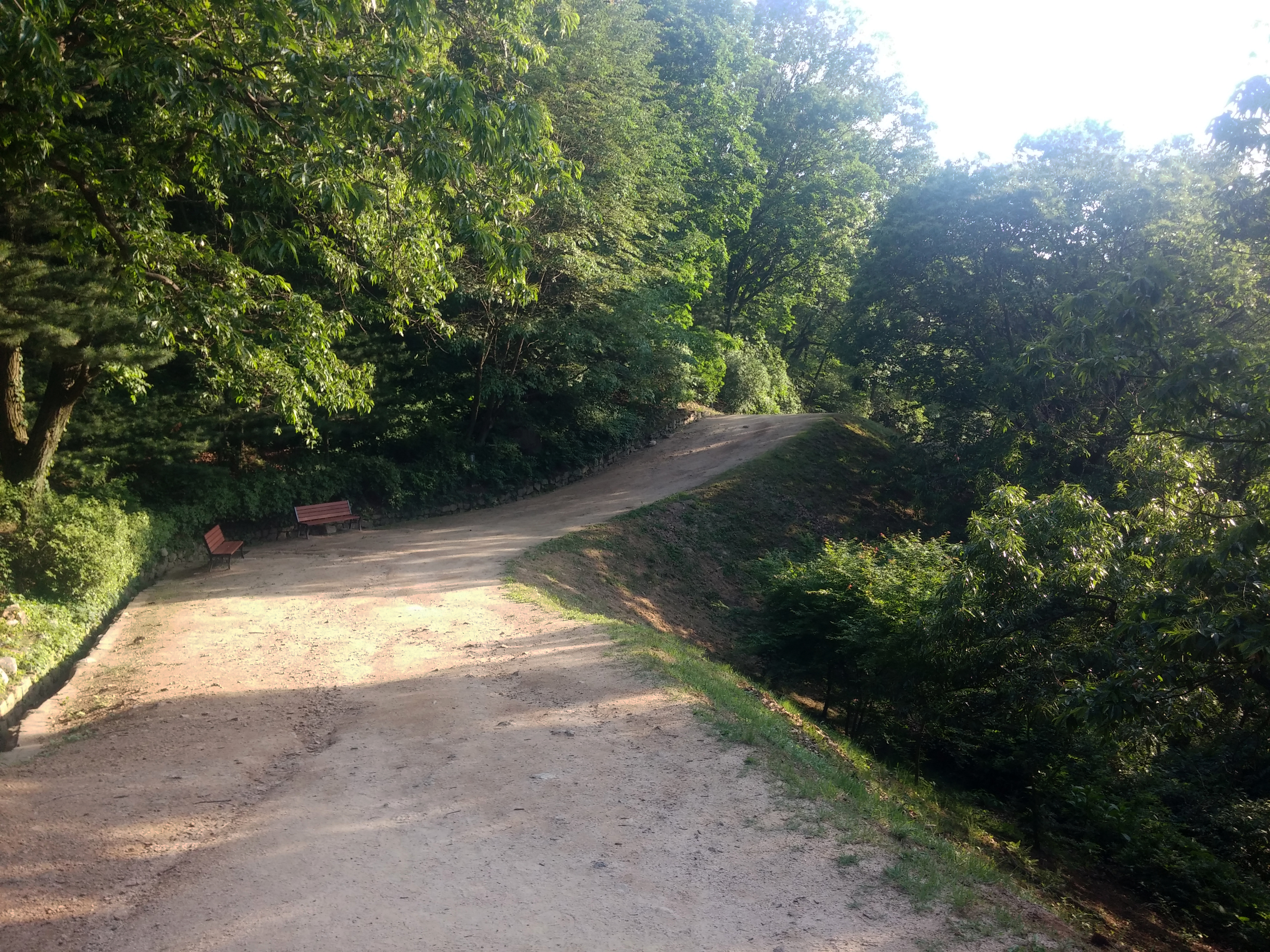
- Path along the fortress wall (2016)
- Interactive map of the Haengjusanseong area

General information
- Location: Deogyang District, Goyang, South Korea
- Coordinates: 37°35′49″N 126°49′55″E

Design and construction
- Designations

Historic Sites of South Korea
- Designated: 1963-01-21
- Reference no.: 56

Haengjusanseong (Korean: 행주산성; Hanja: 幸州山城) is an ancient Korean fortress in Deogyang District, Goyang, South Korea. On January 21, 1963, it was designated Historic Site of South Korea No. 56.

It was built during the Three Kingdoms of Korea period, possibly around the mid-7th century. It was the site of the 1593 Battle of Haengju during the 1592–1598 Imjin War. The first excavation at the site was conducted in 1991. Parts of the fortress began to be restored then. Another investigation began in 2000. More research was conducted in 2016, 2017, and 2019. These investigations found that the fortress had been rebuilt several times over through the Goryeo and Joseon periods.

There is a monument to the Battle of Haengju on the top of the mountain that was constructed in 1603. The temple Chungjangsa is also on the mountain; it enshrines a portrait of Kwŏn Yul, the Korean general of the battle.
