= Pyeongtaek–Paju Expressway =

Road in South Korea

Expressway No.17
- Pyeongtaek–Paju Expressway
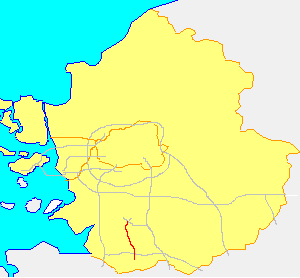

Route information
- Length: 109.7 km (68.2 mi)
- Existed: Pyeongtaek–Hwaseong : 2009; Suwon–Gwangmyeong: 2016–present

Major junctions
- From: Pyeongtaek, Gyeonggi-do; National Route 38
- To: Paju, Gyeonggi-do; Jayu-ro

Location
- Country: South Korea

Highway system
- Highway systems of South Korea; Expressways; National; Local

- Pyeongtaek–Paju Expressway
- Hangul: 평택파주고속도로
- Hanja: 平澤坡州高速道路
- RR: Pyeongtaek Paju gosok doro
- MR: P'yŏngt'aek P'aju kosok toro

Pyeongtaek–Paju Expressway (Korean: 평택파주고속도로) is an expressway in South Korea. It connects Pyeongtaek to Paju in Gyeonggi Province. The expressway's route number is 17, which it shares with the Iksan–Pyeongtaek Expressway. This expressway overlaps with the Capital Region Second Ring Expressway at Hwaseong.

== History ==
- 3 Nov 2004 : #411. Pyeongtaek–Hwaseong Expressway was designated
- 3 Jan 2008 : Pyeongtaek–Hwaseong Expressway was split to #17. Pyeongtaek–Hwaseong Expressway and #171. Osan–Hwaseong Expressway; and #17. Suwon–Gwangmyeong Expressway was designated
- 17 Nov 2008 : Suwon–Gwangmyeong Expressway was renamed to #17. Suwon–Munsan Expressway
- 29 Oct 2009 : Pyeongtaek–Hwaseong segment was opened to traffic
- 29 Apr 2016 : Suwon–Gwangmyeong segment except Soha IC was opened to traffic
- 3 Jul 2016 : Soha IC was opened to traffic
- 12 Jan 2018 : Pyeongtaek–Hwaseong Expressway and Suwon–Munsan Expressway were merged to #17. Pyeongtaek–Paju Expressway
- 7 Nov 2020 : The section of the Expressway from Seoul to Munsan was opened to traffic
- Aug 2026 : The section of the Expressway from Gwangmyeong to Seoul, the last unconstructed part of the Pyeongtaek–Paju Expressway, is scheduled to open to traffic

== Compositions ==
=== Lanes ===
- W. Osan JC – S. Gunpo IC; S. Gwangmyeong IC – Seongchae IC/Soha IC: 4 lanes
- Oseong IC – W. Osan JC; S. Gunpo IC – S. Gwangmyeong IC: 6 lanes

=== Length ===
- Pyeongtaek – Hwaseong: 26.7 km
- Suwon – Gwangmyeong: 27.38 km
- Gwangmyeong – Seoul: 17.9 km
- Seoul – Munsan: 35.6 km

=== Speed limit ===
- 100 km/h

== List of facilities ==
- IC: Interchange, JC: Junction, SA: Service Area, TG: Tollgate
  - Light purple (■): Capital Region Second Ring Expressway overlap
  - Light green (■): Incheon Airport Expressway overlap

=== Main Section (Pyeongtaek-Gwangmyeong, Seoul-Paju) ===
No.	Name	Korean name	Distance (km)		Connection	Location		Note
Connected directly with National Route 43
1	Oseong IC	오성 나들목	-	0.00	National Route 38 (Seodong-daero); National Route 43 (Sejong–Pyeongtaek Motorway)	Gyeonggi	Pyeongtaek	
2	Pyeongtaek JC	평택 분기점	1.66	1.66	Pyeongtaek–Jecheon Expressway	Gyeonggi	Pyeongtaek	
3	Eoyeon IC	어연 나들목	2.74	4.40	Local Route 302 (Cheongwon-ro)	Gyeonggi	Pyeongtaek	
TG	N. Pyeongtaek TG	북평택 요금소				Gyeonggi	Pyeongtaek	
5	Hyangnam IC	향남 나들목	8.41	12.81	Local Route 82 (Balan-ro); Local Route 315 (Mannyeon-ro)	Gyeonggi	Hwaseong	
6	W.Osan JC	서오산 분기점	5.34	18.15	Osan-Hwaseong Expressway; Capital Region Second Ring Expressway	Gyeonggi	Osan	Connected with Osan-Hwaseong Expressway at Hwaseong-bound; Connected with Capital Region Second Ring Expressway at Pyeongtaek-bound
	Jeongnam IC	정남 나들목	2.73	20.88	Local Route 309 (Seja-ro); Local Route 322 (Seja-ro)	Gyeonggi	Hwaseong	Local Route 309 overlap
	Hwaseong JC	화성 분기점	1.54	22.42	Capital Region Second Ring Expressway	Gyeonggi	Hwaseong	Local Route 309 overlap
	Bongdam IC	봉담 나들목	3.78	26.20	Local Route 309 (Gwacheon-Bongdam Highway); National Route 43 (Samcheonbyeongma-ro); Local Route 84 (Hyohaeng-ro)	Gyeonggi	Hwaseong	Local Route 309 overlap
1	Geumgok IC	금곡 나들목	6.29	32.49	Gwacheon-Bongdam Highway	Gyeonggi	Suwon	Paju-bound Only
2	E. Ansan·Dangsu IC	동안산·당수 나들목	1.80	34.29	National Route 42 (Suin-ro)	Gyeonggi	Ansan	Suwon-bound Only
3	S.Gunpo IC	남군포 나들목	2.95	37.24	National Route 47; Yeongdong Expressway	Gyeonggi	Gunpo	
4	E.Siheung JC	동시흥 분기점	9.51	46.75	Local Route 330 (3rd Gyeongin Highway); Seohaean Expressway	Gyeonggi	Siheung	
5	S.Gwangmyeong JC	남광명 분기점	2.38	49.13	Branch Line (S.Gwangmyeong–Soha)	Gyeonggi	Gwangmyeong	
S. Gwangmyeong JC–88 JC Segment (Gwangmyeong–Seoul) is under construction
	88 JC	88 분기점	-	67.03	Olympic Expressway; Incheon International Airport Expressway	Seoul	Gangseo	
	Bungno JC	북로 분기점	1.62	68.65	National Route 77 (Jayu-ro)	Gyeonggi	Goyang	
	Haengju Sanseong JC	행주산성 분기점	0.53		Gwonyul-daero	Gyeonggi	Goyang	
1	Bongdaesan JC	봉대산 분기점	1.90		S.Goyang - Bongdaesan section	Gyeonggi	Goyang	
2	Heungdo IC	흥도 나들목	1.70		Goyang City Road 79 (Gwonyul-daero)	Gyeonggi	Goyang	
TG	Goyang TG	고양 요금소				Gyeonggi	Goyang	
SA	Goyang SA	고양 휴게소				Gyeonggi	Goyang	
3	Goyang JC	고양 분기점	5.60		Capital Region First Ring Expressway	Gyeonggi	Goyang	
4	Sarihyeon IC	사리현 나들목	2.80		Sarihyeon-ro	Gyeonggi	Goyang	
5	N. Goyang(Seolmun) IC	북고양(설문) 나들목	5.55		Local Route 363 (Gobong-ro)	Gyeonggi	Goyang	
6	Geumchon IC	금촌 나들목	3.55		Jungang-ro	Gyeonggi	Paju	
7	Wollong IC	월롱 나들목	5.30		Local Route 360 (Geumwol-ro)	Gyeonggi	Paju	
Planned (directly connected to Wolong-Munsan section for now)

=== S. Gwangmyeong - Seonghae/Soha section ===
No.	Name	Korean name	Hanja name	Connections	Location	Notes
5	S. Gwangmyeong JC	남광명 분기점	南光明 分岐點	Main Line	Gwangmyeong; Gyeonggi-do	
TG	S. Gwangmyeong TG	남광명 요금소	南光明 料金所		Gwangmyeong; Gyeonggi-do	Main tollgate
6	Seongchae IC	성채	城砦	Haan-ro; Kia-ro	Gwangmyeong; Gyeonggi-do	Entrance from Gwangmyeong-bound and exit to Soha-bound only
6	Soha IC	소하	昭夏	Seoul Metropolitan Road 94 (Gangnam Beltway); National Route 1 (Seobu Ganseondoro)	Gwangmyeong; Gyeonggi-do	Entrance from Gwangmyeong-bound and exit to Soha-bound only
6	Soha JC	소하 분기점	小夏分岐點	Seohaean Expressway; Seoul Metropolitan Road 94 (Gangnam Beltway)	Gwangmyeong; Gyeonggi-do	No access to Seohaean Expressway from Soha-bound
Directly connected with Seoul Metropolitan Road 94 (Gangnam Beltway)

=== S. Goyang - Bongdaesan section ===
No.	Name	Korean name	Hanja name	Connections	Location	Notes
	S. Goyang IC	남고양 나들목	南高陽 나들목	National Route 77 (Jayu-ro)	Goyang, Gyeonggi-do	
1	Bongdaesan JC	봉대산 분기점	烽臺山 分岐點	Main section	Goyang, Gyeonggi-do	No access to main line section from Bongdaesan-bound
Directly connected to the main line section

=== Sandan - Naepo section ===
No.	Name	Korean name	Hanja name	Connections	Location	Notes
8	Sandan IC	산단 나들목	産團 나들목	Seoyeong-ro; Hyuam-ro	Paju, Gyeonggi-do	Entry from Pyeongtaek-bound and exit to Paju-bound only Main tollgate (integrated interchange and tollgate)
TG	Sandan Tollgate	산단 요금소	山團料金所	Seoyeong-ro; Hyuam-ro	Paju, Gyeonggi-do	Entry from Pyeongtaek-bound and exit to Paju-bound only Main tollgate (integrated interchange and tollgate)
9	Naepo IC	내포 나들목	內浦 交叉路	National Route 77 (Jayu-ro); Bangchon-ro	Paju, Gyeonggi-do	
Directly connected to National Route 77 (Jayu-ro)

== Major stopovers ==
Gyeonggi Province

- Pyeongtaek (Oseong-myeon - Cheongbuk-eup) - Hwaseong (Yanggam-myeon) - Pyeongtaek (Seotan-myeon) - Hwaseong (Yanggam-myeon) - Pyeongtaek (Seotan-myeon) - Hwaseong (Yanggam-myeon) - Pyeongtaek (Seotan-myeon) - Hwaseong (Yanggam-myeon) - Pyeongtaek (Seotan-myeon) - Hwaseong (Yanggam-myeon - Hyangnam-eup) - Pyeongtaek (Seotan-myeon) - Hwaseong (Jeongnam-myeon) - Osan (Seorang-dong) - Hwaseong (Jeongnam-myeon - Bongdam-eup - Maesong-myeon) - Suwon Gwonseon-gu (Homaesil-dong - Geumgok-dong - Dangsu-dong) - Ansan Sangnok-gu (Sasa-dong) - Gunpo (Domagyo-dong - Bugok-dong - Daeyami-dong - Sokdal-dong) - Ansan Sangnok-gu (Suam-dong) - Siheung (Jonam-dong - Mokgam-dong - Nongok-dong) - Gwangmyeong (Gahak-dong - Noonsa-dong - Gwangmyeong-dong - Okgil-dong) - Bucheon (Okgil-dong)
- Branch 1: Gwangmyeong (Gahak-dong - Soha-dong)

Seoul

- Guro District (Hang-dong)

Gyeonggi Province

- Bucheon (Goean-dong - Yeokgok-dong)

Seoul

- Guro District (Onsu-dong)

Gyeonggi Province

- Bucheon (Chunui-dong - Jak-dong)

Seoul

- Yangcheon District (Sinwol-dong)

Gyeonggi Province

- Bucheon (Gogang-dong)

Seoul

- Yangcheon District (Sinwol-dong)

Gyeonggi Province

- Bucheon (Gogang-dong)

Seoul

- Gangseo District (Oebalsan-dong - Gonghang-dong - Banghwa-dong)

Gyeonggi Province

- Goyang Deogyang-gu (Gangmae-dong - Haengsin-dong - Donae-dong - Seongsa-dong - Hwajeong-dong - Seongsa-dong - Wondang-dong) - Ilsandong-gu (Sarihyeon-dong - Munbong-dong - Siksa-dong - Munbong-dong - Seongseok-dong - Seolmun-dong) - Paju (Jori-eup - Geumneung-dong - Adong-dong - Wollong-myeon - Paju-eup - Munsan-eup)
- Branch 2: Goyang Deogyang-gu (Deogeun-dong - Hyeoncheon-dong)

== See also ==
- Expressways in South Korea
- Transport in South Korea
