= Gimpohangang-ro =

Road in South Korea

Gimpo Hangang Highway
- 김포한강로

Route information
- Length: 16.4 km (10.2 mi)
- Existed: 11 July 2011–present

Major junctions
- South end: Gaehwa-dong, Gangseo District, Seoul
- North end: Unyang-dong, Gimpo, Gyeonggi Province

Location
- Country: South Korea

Highway system
- Highway systems of South Korea; Expressways; National; Local

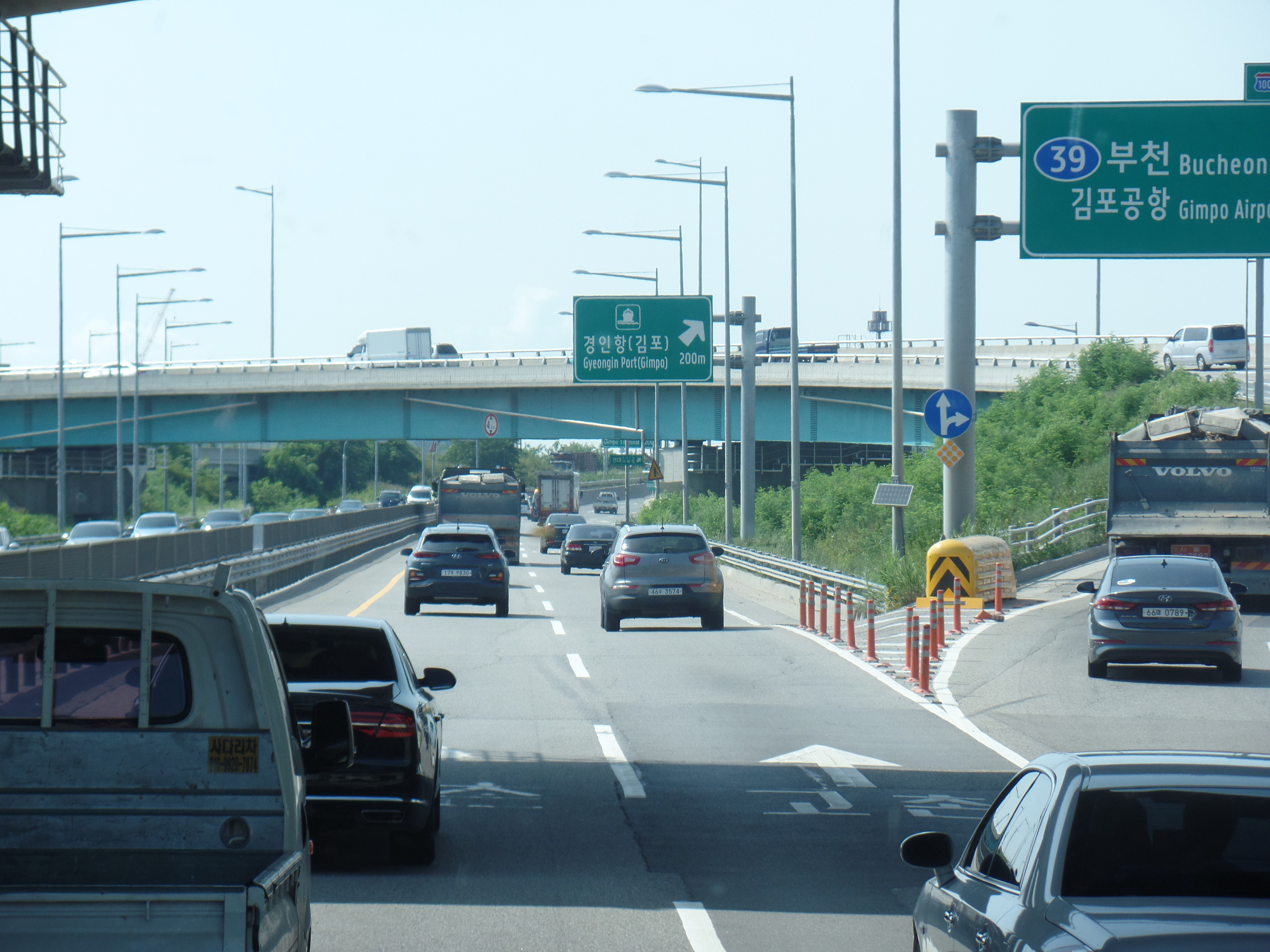
Highway start spot (Gaehwa IC).

The Gimpo Hangang Highway (Korean: 김포한강로; RR: Gimpo Hangang-ro) is a 6-lanes highway in South Korea, connecting Gangseo District, Seoul to Gimpo, Gyeonggi Province.

== Main stopovers ==
Seoul

- Gaehwa-dong

Gyeonggi Province

- Gimpo (Gochon-eup - Sau-dong - Geolpo-dong - Unyang-dong)

== Composition ==
- Notes
  - IC : Interchange
  - IS : Intersection
  - TN : Tunnel
  - BR : Bridge

Type	Name	Korean name	Connection	Location		Notes
Connected with Local Route 356 (Yanggok-ro)
IC	Unyang · Yonghwasa	운양 · 용화사	Gimpohangang 6-ro Local Route 78 (Geumpo-ro); Local Route 356 (Yanggok-ro)	Gimpo	Unyang-dong	
TN	Narae Underpass	나래지하차도		Gimpo	Unyang-dong	
IC	Gimpo Hangang New Town	김포한강신도시	Gimpohangang 1-ro Local Route 78 (Geumpo-ro)	Gimpo	Unyang-dong	Gimpo-bound Only
IS	No name	(이름 없음)	Local Route 78 (Geumpo-ro); Hongdopyeong-ro	Gimpo	Gimpobon-dong	Gimpo-bound Only
IC	Hangang Cinepolis	한강시네폴리스	Saujung-ro	Gimpo	Gochon-eup	
IC	Singok	신곡	Eunhaengyeongsajeong-ro	Gimpo	Gochon-eup	
IC	Yeongsajeong	영사정	Seoul Ring Expressway	Gimpo	Gochon-eup	Under construction
IC	Jeonho	전호	Local Route 78 (Geumpo-ro); Arayuk-ro	Gimpo	Gochon-eup	Seoul-bound Only
BR	Jeonho Bridge	전호대교		Gimpo	Gochon-eup	
BR	Jeonho Bridge	전호대교		Seoul	Gangseo District	
IC	Gaehwa	개화	National Route 39 (Beolmal-ro · Gaehwadong-ro); National Route 48 (Gaehwadong-ro); Local Route 78 (Geumpo-ro); Arayuk-ro	Seoul	Gangseo District	
Connected with Olympic-daero

== See also ==
- Roads and expressways in South Korea
- Transportation in South Korea
- Olympic-daero
