= Banghwa Bridge =

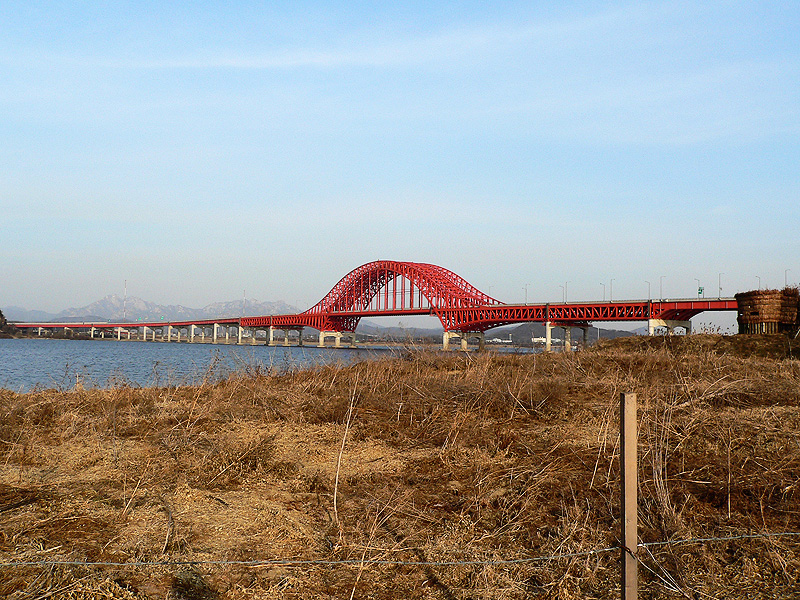
- Coordinates: 37°35′17″N 126°49′35″E
- Carries: Incheon International Airport Expressway
- Crosses: Han River
- Locale: Seoul, South Korea
- Owner: New Airport Highway Company
- Maintained by: New Airport Highway Company
- Preceded by: Magok Railway Bridge
- Followed by: Haengju Bridge

Characteristics
- Design: Girder and Truss
- Total length: 2,559 m (8,396 ft)

History
- Constructed by: Poong Lim Industrial
- Construction start: December 29, 1995
- Construction end: November 11, 2000

Statistics
- Toll: Yes

Location
- Interactive map of Banghwa Bridge

- Banghwa Bridge
- Hangul: 방화대교
- Hanja: 傍花大橋
- RR: Banghwa daegyo
- MR: Panghwa taegyo

The Banghwa Bridge (Korean: 방화대교) is a bridge in South Korea. It crosses the Han River, connecting the Gangseo District, Seoul with Goyang, Gyeonggi Province. The bridge is a part of the Incheon International Airport Expressway. At over 2.5 km in length, it is the longest bridge to cross the Han River. Though mostly a girder bridge, the middle 540m section is an arch truss, resembling the shape of an airplane taking off.
