= Changneungcheon =

River in South Korea

Changneungcheon (Korean: 창릉천) is a river of South Korea. It is a tributary of the Han River.
