= National Route 39 (South Korea) =

Road in South Korea

National Route 39
- 국도 제39호선

Route information
- Length: 225.4 km (140.1 mi)
- Existed: 14 March 1981–present

Major junctions
- South end: National Route 40 in Buyeo County
- North end: National Route 3 in Uijeongbu

Location
- Country: South Korea

Highway system
- Highway systems of South Korea; Expressways; National; Local

National Route 39 (Korean: 국도 제39호선, Gukdo Je Samsip-gu(39) Hoseon) is a national highway in South Korea. It connects Buyeo to Gongju, Asan, Hwaseong, Siheung, Bucheon, Seoul, Goyang, and Uijeongbu. National Route 39 opened on 14 March 1981

== History ==
- March 14, 1981: National Route 39, the Buyeo–Uijeongbu Line, was established.
- April 6, 1981: A 125 km section between the provincial boundary at Hyeondeok-myeon, Pyeongtaek County (Asan Bay Embankment), and Uijeongbu-dong, Uijeongbu City, which had been elevated to national highway status, was opened.
- April 16, 1981: A 75.732 km section between Eunsan-ri, Eunsan-myeon, Buyeo County, and Gongse-ri, Inju-myeon, Asan County, which had been elevated to national highway status, was opened.
- May 30, 1981: The road district was determined for the newly established 159 km section following the amendment of the General National Highway Route Designation Decree by Presidential Decree No. 10247.
- August 22, 1987: An 800 m section in Onju-dong, Onyang City, was opened, while the existing 990 m section was abolished.
- February 17, 1990: The existing designated 370 m section in Yamok-ri, Maesong-myeon, Hwaseong County, and the existing designated 110 m section in Yangno-ri, Bibong-myeon, Hwaseong County, were abolished.
- March 9, 1991: The existing designated section in Hajung-dong, Siheung City, was abolished.
- November 1, 1997: The 12.79 km Anjung–Balan road between Anjung-ri, Anjung-myeon, Pyeongtaek City, and Sangsin-ri, Hyangnam-myeon, Hwaseong County, was opened, while the existing 3.26 km section was abolished.
- December 23, 1997: A 1.3 km section in Sanjeong-ri, Sinpung-myeon, Gongju City, was opened, while the existing section was abolished.
- May 11, 1998: The 12.4 km Asan Dam–Anjung road between Gongse-ri, Inju-myeon, Asan City, and Anjung-ri, Anjung-myeon, Pyeongtaek City, was widened and opened. The existing 12.4 km section between the southern end of the drainage sluice gate at the Asan Bay Embankment in Gwoneung-ri, Hyeondeok-myeon, Pyeongtaek City, and Hyeondeok Intersection, and the existing 5.8 km section between Dodae-ri, Hyeondeok-myeon, and Anjung-ri, Anjung-myeon, were abolished.
- October 12, 1998: A 1.4 km section between Huigok-ri, Eunsan-myeon, Buyeo County, and Guryong-ri, Jangpyeong-myeon, Cheongyang County, was widened and opened, while the existing 1.63 km section was abolished.
- January 10, 2000: The 14.1 km section between Silok-dong, Asan City, and Gongse-ri, Inju-myeon, was widened and opened.
- December 28, 2000: The 2.523 km section of Haengju Bridge between Gaehwa-dong, Gangseo District, Seoul, and Haengjuoe-dong, Deogyang District, Goyang City, was widened and opened, while the existing 1.74 km Old Haengju Bridge section was abolished.
- December 20, 2002: The 21.66 km Balan–Banwol road between Sangsin-ri, Hyangnam-myeon, Hwaseong City, and Sasa-dong, Ansan City, was widened and opened, while the existing section between Jeam-ri, Hyangnam-myeon, Hwaseong City, and Geongeon-dong, Ansan City, was abolished.
- January 6, 2003: The 6.6 km section between Yeomseong-ri, Yeomchi-eup, Asan City, and Eupnae-ri, Sinchang-myeon, was designated as an automobile-only road.
- May 17, 2006: The 4.9 km section between Sindong, Asan City, and Yongdu-ri, Tangjeong-myeon, was designated as an automobile-only road.
- March 26, 2010: The 9.34 km Todang–Gwansan road between Samsindang Overpass in Todang-dong, Deogyang District, Goyang City, and Dupodong Intersection in Gwansan-dong was designated as an automobile-only road.
- November 22, 2010: The 6.64 km section between Eupnae-ri, Sinchang-myeon, Asan City, and Yeomseong-ri, Yeomchi-eup, was widened and opened.
- December 31, 2010: Following the opening of the Asan National Highway Bypass, the existing 9.3 km section between Gokgyo-ri, Yeomchi-eup, and Jangjon-dong, Asan City, was abolished.
- April 15, 2016: A new 680 m section at Songgok Intersection, between Songgok-ri and Baegam-ri, Yeomchi-eup, Asan City, was opened.
- October 27, 2016: The 6.88 km Jangheung–Songchu bypass road between Ilyeong-ri and Uldae-ri, Jangheung-myeon, Yangju City, was designated as an automobile-only road.
- December 29, 2016: The 8.25 km Jangheung–Songchu bypass road between Ilyeong-ri and Uldae-ri, Jangheung-myeon, Yangju City, was newly opened.
- January 26, 2017: The 2.82 km Yeomseong–Yongdu section of the Asan National Highway Bypass Road, between Yeomseong-ri and Seokjeong-ri, Yeomchi-eup, Asan City, was designated as an automobile-only road.
- March 9, 2017: Following the opening of the Jangheung–Songchu bypass road, the existing 6.7 km section between Ilyeong-ri and Uldae-ri, Jangheung-myeon, Yangju City, was abolished.
- December 28, 2018: The ramp section at Gokgyo Intersection in Gokgyo-ri, Yeomchi-eup, Asan City, was improved and opened.
- December 23, 2019: Following the opening of the Yeomseong–Yongdu road, the existing section of the Asan National Highway Bypass between Jangjon-dong, Sinchang-myeon, and Gokgyo-ri, Yeomchi-eup, was removed from the route designation, and the route was changed to include the Yeomseong–Yongdu road, running between Jangjon-dong, Sindong, and Gokgyo-ri.
- December 30, 2019: The 3.44 km Yeomseong–Yongdu road between Gokgyo-ri and Songgok-ri, Yeomchi-eup, Asan City, was newly opened.
- December 17, 2021: The 9.34 km section between Todang-dong and Gwansan-dong, Deogyang District, Goyang City, was designated as an automobile-only road.
- December 31, 2021: The 9.34 km Todang–Gwansan road of the Goyang National Highway Bypass, between Todang-dong and Gwansan-dong, Deogyang District, Goyang City, was newly opened.
- July 1, 2024: The 1.2 km Dundae–Hajung road section in Hajung-dong, Siheung City, was widened and opened.
- December 27, 2024: The 12.8 km Cheongyang–Sinpung road between Seojeong-ri, Jeongsan-myeon, Cheongyang County, and Dongwon-ri, Sinpung-myeon, Gongju City, was newly opened.

== Main stopovers ==
South Chungcheong Province

- Buyeo County - Cheongyang County - Gongju - Asan

Gyeonggi Province

- Pyeongtaek - Hwaseong - Ansan (Sangnok-gu - Danwon-gu) - Siheung - Bucheon

Incheon

- Gyeyang District

Seoul

- Gangseo District

Gyeonggi Province

- Goyang (Deogyang-gu) - Yangju - Uijeongbu

== Major intersections ==
=== South Chungcheong ===
IS: Intersection, IC: Interchange

| Name (Note: Intersection and interchange are also included, as well as buildings and facilities in the surrounding area) | Hangul name | Connections | Location | | Note |
|---|---|---|---|---|---|
| Gatap IS | 가탑 교차로 | National Route 40 (Seongwang-ro) | Buyeo | Buyeo-eup | Terminus; National Route 4 and 40 overlap |
| Daewang IS | 대왕 교차로 | Geumseong-ro | Buyeo | Buyeo-eup | National Route 4 and 40 overlap |
| Buyeo IS | 부여 교차로 | Seongwang-ro | Buyeo | Buyeo-eup | National Route 4 and 40 overlap |
| Buyeo Bridge | | | Buyeo | Buyeo-eup | National Route 4 and 40 overlap |
| Buyeo Bridge | | | Buyeo | Gyuam-myeon | National Route 4 and 40 overlap |
| Gyuam IS | 규암 교차로 | Prefectural Route 625 (Chungjeol-ro) | Buyeo | Gyuam-myeon | National Route 4 and 40 overlap |
| Naeri IS | 내리 교차로 | National Route 4 National Route 40 (Daebaekje-ro); National Route 29 (Gyuamuhoedo-ro) | Buyeo | Gyuam-myeon | National Route 4, 40 and 29 overlap |
| Ansan IS | 반산 교차로 | Heungsu-ro | Buyeo | Gyuam-myeon | National Route 29 overlap |
| Labok IS | 라복 교차로 | Hoban-ro | Buyeo | Gyuam-myeon | National Route 29 overlap |
| Ilgwangcheon Bridge | 일광천교 | | Buyeo | Gyuam-myeon | National Route 29 overlap |
| Buyeo IC (Buyeo IS) | 부여 나들목 (부여 교차로) | Seocheon-Gongju Expressway | Buyeo | Gyuam-myeon | National Route 29 overlap |
| Eunsan IS | 은산 교차로 | National Route 29 (Gyuamuhoedo-ro); Prefectural Route 723 (Chungui-ro) | Buyeo | Eunsan-myeon | National Route 29 and Prefectural Route 723 overlap |
| Eunsan Agricultural Complex Eunsan Bridge | 은산농공단지 은산교 | | Buyeo | Eunsan-myeon | Prefectural Route 723 overlap |
| Eunsan IS | 은산사거리 | Chungjeol-ro | Buyeo | Eunsan-myeon | Prefectural Route 723 overlap |
| Eunsan-myeon | 은산면사무소 | | Buyeo | Eunsan-myeon | Prefectural Route 723 overlap |
| Eunsanjung Middle School IS | 은산중학교 교차로 | Eundong-ro | Buyeo | Eunsan-myeon | Prefectural Route 723 overlap |
| Eunsanjung Middle School Eunsan Elementary School | 은산중학교 은산초등학교 | | Buyeo | Eunsan-myeon | Prefectural Route 723 overlap |
| Gulyong IS | 구룡삼거리 | Jicheon-ro | Buyeo | Eunsan-myeon | Prefectural Route 723 overlap |
| Jicheon Bridge | | | Buyeo | Eunsan-myeon | Prefectural Route 723 overlap |
| Jicheon Bridge | | | Cheongyang | Jangpyeong-myeon | Prefectural Route 723 overlap |
| No name | (이름 없음) | Prefectural Route 723 (Hwasan-ro) | Cheongyang | Jangpyeong-myeon | Prefectural Route 723 overlap |
| Jangpyeong IS | 장평사거리 | Prefectural Route 645 (Kkachinae-ro) | Cheongyang | Jangpyeong-myeon | Prefectural Route 645 overlap |
| Jangpyeong Elementary School | 장평초등학교 | Prefectural Route 645 (Geumgangbyeon-ro) | Cheongyang | Jangpyeong-myeon | Prefectural Route 645 overlap |
| Jangpyeong Middle School | 장평중학교 | | Cheongyang | Jangpyeong-myeon | |
| Midang IS | 미당사거리 | Dolim-ro | Cheongyang | Jangpyeong-myeon | |
| Midang Bridge | 미당교 | | Cheongyang | Jangpyeong-myeon | |
| Hagam Bridge | | | Cheongyang | Jangpyeong-myeon | |
| Hagam Bridge | | | Cheongyang | Jeongsan-myeon | |
| Cheongyang IC (Hagam IS) | 청양 나들목 (학암삼거리) | Seocheon-Gongju Expressway | Cheongyang | Jeongsan-myeon | |
| Sindeok IS | 신덕삼거리 | Saeul-gil | Cheongyang | Jeongsan-myeon | |
| Jeongsan IS | 정산삼거리 | Hyoja-gil | Cheongyang | Jeongsan-myeon | |
| Seojeongli IS | 서정리사거리 | National Route 36 (Chilgapsan-ro) | Cheongyang | Jeongsan-myeon | |
| Eojeong IS | 서정삼거리 | Yeokmal-gil | Cheongyang | Jeongsan-myeon | |
| Solchi Tunnel | | | Cheongyang | Jeongsan-myeon | 400m long |
| Solchi Tunnel | | | Gongju City | Sinpung-myeon | 400m long |
| Cheongheung IS | 청흥삼거리 | Prefectural Route 96 (Yongsubonggap-gil) | Gongju City | Sinpung-myeon | Prefectural Route 96 overlap |
| (Ipdong) | (입동) | Prefectural Route 604 (Daelyongjopyeong-gil) | Gongju City | Sinpung-myeon | Prefectural Route 96 and Prefectural Route 604 |
| Ipdong IS | 입동 교차로 | Prefectural Route 96 (Yongbongipdong-ro) | Gongju City | Sinpung-myeon | Prefectural Route 96 and Prefectural Route 604 |
| Sanjeong IS | 산정 교차로 | National Route 32 (Jadong) | Gongju City | Sinpung-myeon | National Route 32 overlap Prefectural Route 604 overlap |
| Sinpung IS | 신풍삼거리 | Beoltteum-gil | Gongju City | Sinpung-myeon | National Route 32 overlap Prefectural Route 604 overlap |
| Sanjeong IS | 산정삼거리 | Sinpung-gil | Gongju City | Sinpung-myeon | National Route 32 overlap Prefectural Route 604 overlap |
| Mancheon IS | 만천 교차로 | National Route 32 (Chadong-ro) | Gongju City | Sinpung-myeon | National Route 32 overlap Prefectural Route 604 overlap |
| Mannyeongyoap IS | 만년교앞 교차로 | Yuguoegwang-ro | Gongju City | Yugu-eup | Prefectural Route 604 overlap |
| Gongju Meister High School | 공주마이스터고등학교 | | Gongju City | Yugu-eup | Prefectural Route 604 overlap |
| No name | (이름 없음) | Prefectural Route 604 (Yugumagoksa-ro) | Gongju City | Yugu-eup | Prefectural Route 604 overlap |
| Suchon Bridge IS | 수촌교삼거리 | Jungang 1-gil | Gongju City | Yugu-eup | |
| Suchon IS | 수촌삼거리 | Jungang 2-gil | Gongju City | Yugu-eup | |
| Yuggyo IS | 유구교 교차로 | Changmal-gil | Gongju City | Yugu-eup | |
| Yugu IC | 유구 나들목 | Dangjin-Yeongdeok Expressway | Gongju City | Yugu-eup | |
| Deokam Elementary School | 덕암초등학교 | | Gongju City | Yugu-eup | |
| Tapgok IS | 탑곡삼거리 | Prefectural Route 618 (Mungeum-gil) | Gongju City | Yugu-eup | |
| Gakheul Pass | | | Gongju City | Yugu-eup | |
| Gakheul Pass | | | Asan City | Songak-myeon | |
| Yeokchon IS | 역촌삼거리 | Songak-ro714beon-gil | Asan City | Songak-myeon | |
| Oeam IS | 외암삼거리 | Oeam-ro | Asan City | Songak-myeon | |
| Oeam IS | 외암사거리 | Gangdang-ro; Yeokchon-gil | Asan City | Songak-myeon | |
| No name | (이름 없음) | Prefectural Route 616 (Songak-ro) | Asan City | Songak-myeon | |
| Jangchon IS | 장촌 교차로 | National Route 21 (Onyangsunhwan-ro) | Asan City | Onyang 1(il)-dong | National Route 21 overlap |
| Chosa IS | 초사 교차로 | Mugunghwa-ro | Asan City | Onyang 1(il)-dong | National Route 21 overlap |
| Haengbok IS | 행목 교차로 | Prefectural Route 623 (Suncheonhyang-ro) | Asan City | Sinchang-myeon | National Route 21 overlap |
| Eubnae IS | 읍내 교차로 | National Route 21; National Route 45 (Oncheondae-ro) | Asan City | Sinchang-myeon | National Route 21 overlap |
| Sindal IS | 신달 교차로 | Seobubuk-ro | Asan City | Sinchang-myeon | |
| Sujang IS | 수장 교차로 | Sujang-ro | Asan City | Sinchang-myeon | |
| Gokgyo IS | 곡교 교차로 | Asan-ro | Asan City | Yeomchi-eup | |
| Yeomchi IS | 염치 교차로 | Prefectural Route 624 (Huyndai-ro) | Asan City | Yeomchi-eup | |
| Yeomchi IC | 염치 나들목 | Asan-Cheongju Expressway | Asan City | Yeomchi-eup | Under construction Asan-Cheongju Expressway will be opening in 2017 |
| Suwon IS | 서원 교차로 | Prefectural Route 70 | Asan City | Yeomchi-eup | Under construction Asan-Cheongju Expressway will be opening in 2017 |
| Seowon IS | 서원삼거리 | Sinsuli-gil | Asan City | Yeomchi-eup | |
| Asan IS | 아산 교차로 | Prefectural Route 628 (Asanoncheon-ro) (Yeongin-ro) | Asan City | Yeongin-myeon | |
| Asan 1 IS | 아산1 교차로 | Tojeong-ro | Asan City | Yeongin-myeon | |
| Sinun IS | 신운 교차로 | Yeongin-ro | Asan City | Yeongin-myeon | |
| Wolseon IS | 월선 교차로 | Wolseon-gil | Asan City | Yeongin-myeon | |
| Gongse IS | 공세 교차로 | Gongse-gil | Asan City | Inju-myeon | |
| IC (No name) | 입체 교차로 (이름 없음) | National Route 34; National Route 38; National Route 77 (Seohae-ro) (Jangyeongsil-ro) | Asan City | Inju-myeon | National Route 38 and 77 overlap |
| Asan Lake IS | 아산호 교차로 | | Asan City | Inju-myeon | National Route 38 and 77 overlap |
| Asan Bay Seawall | 아산만방조제 | | Asan City | Inju-myeon | National Route 38 and 77 overlap |

=== Future intersection ===
- Will be opening in 2020:

Tangjeong Intersection ~ Hyeonchungsaap Intersection~ Songgok 2 Intersection ~ Seokjeong Intersection ~ Gokgyo Intersection

=== Gyeonggi (South Seoul) ===
| Name | Hangul name | Connections | Location | | Note |
|---|---|---|---|---|---|
| Asan Bay Seawall | 아산만방조제 | | Pyeongtaek | Hyeondeok-myeon | National Route 38 and 77 overlap |
| Pyeongtaek Reservoir Bridge | 평택호대교 | | Pyeongtaek | Hyeondeok-myeon | National Route 38 and 77 overlap |
| Hyeondeok IS | 현덕 교차로 | National Route38; National Route 77 (Pyeongtaek Reservoir Road 1) | Pyeongtaek | Hyeondeok-myeon | National Route 38 and 77 overlap |
| Gisan IS | 기산 교차로 | Anhyeon-ro | Pyeongtaek | Hyeondeok-myeon | |
| No name | (이름 없음) | Hyeondeok-ro | Pyeongtaek | Hyeondeok-myeon | |
| Songdam IS | 송담사거리 | Hyeondeok-ro | Pyeongtaek | Anjung-eup | |
| Anjung IS | 안중사거리 | National Route 38 (Seodongdae-ro) | Pyeongtaek | Anjung-eup | |
| Geumgok IS | 금곡삼거리 | Anhyeon-ro | Pyeongtaek | Anjung-eup | |
| No name | (이름 없음) | Yongseong-gil | Pyeongtaek | Anjung-eup | |
| Ottogi Pyeongtaek Factory | 오뚜기라면 평택공장 | | Pyeongtaek | Anjung-eup | |
| No name | (이름 없음) | Cheongbuknam-ro | Pyeongtaek | Cheongbuk-myeon | |
| West Pyeongtaek Stadium | 평택 서부공설운동장 | | Pyeongtaek | Cheongbuk-myeon | |
| Hyeongok Underpass | 현곡지하차도 | Prefectural Route 302 (Cheongwon-ro) | Pyeongtaek | Cheongbuk-myeon | |
| Cheongbuk IC Cheongbuk IS | 청북 나들목 (청북 교차로) | Pyeongtaek–Jecheon Expressway | Pyeongtaek | Cheongbuk-myeon | |
| Goryeom Underpass IS | 고렴지하차도 교차로 | Goryeom-gil | Pyeongtaek | Cheongbuk-myeon | |
| Yodang IS | 요당 교차로 | National Route 82 (Poseunghyangnam-ro); Jageundollae-gil | Hwaseong City | Yanggam-myeon | |
| Yodang IS | 요당 교차로 | Prefectural Route 306 (Amsogogae-ro) | Hwaseong City | Yanggam-myeon | |
| Underpass No name | 지하차도 (이름 없음) | Barangongdan-ro | Hwaseong City | Hyangnam-eup | |
| Gumuncheon 1 Entrance | 구문천1리입구 | Prefectural Route 309 (Jeyakdanji-ro) (Jeyakgongdan 2-gil) | Hwaseong City | Hyangnam-eup | |
| Jeyakgongdan Underpass IS | 제약공단지하차도 교차로 | Jeyakgongdan 1-gil | Hwaseong City | Hyangnam-eup | |
| Pungmu Bridge | 풍무교 | Seobong-ro; Jangan-ro | Hwaseong City | Hyangnam-eup | |
| Sangsin Underpass IS | 상신지하차도 교차로 | Sangsinhagil-ro | Hwaseong City | Hyangnam-eup | |
| Baran IC Sangsin IS | 발안 나들목 (상신 교차로) | Seohaean Expressway; Baranyanggam-ro; Samcheonbyeongma-ro | Hwaseong City | Hyangnam-eup | |
| Baran IS | 발안 교차로 | National Route 82; 3.1 Manse-ro | Hwaseong City | Hyangnam-eup | |
| Jiwolli IS | 지월 교차로 | Jiwol-gil | Hwaseong City | Paltan-myeon | |
| Yulam IS | 율암 교차로 | National Route 82; Prefectural Route 82 (Poseunghyangnam-ro) | Hwaseong City | Paltan-myeon | |
| Paltan IS | 팔탄 교차로 | Prefectural Route 318 (Sicheong-ro) | Hwaseong City | Paltan-myeon | |
| Cheongyo IS | 청요 교차로 | Prefectural Route 322 (Juseok-ro) | Hwaseong City | Bibong-myeon | |
| Jaan IS | 자안 교차로 | Pureundeulpan-ro | Hwaseong City | Bibong-myeon | |
| Yanglo IS | 양노 교차로 | Pureundeulpan-ro | Hwaseong City | Bibong-myeon | |
| Bibong IC Ssanghak IS | 비봉 나들목 (쌍학 교차로) | Seohaean Expressway; Prefectural Route 313 (Hwangseong-ro) | Hwaseong City | Bibong-myeon | |
| Seokgok IS | 숙곡 교차로 | Prefectural Route 84 (Maesong-ro) | Hwaseong City | Maesong-myeon | |
| No name | (이름 없음) | Maesongbuk-gil | Hwaseong City | Maesong-myeon | |
| Yangchon IC | 양촌 나들목 | National Route 42 (Suinsaneobdo-ro); National Route 47 (Seohae-ro) | Ansan City | Sangnok District | National Route 42 overlap |
| No name | (이름 없음) | Banwol-ro; Geonggeon-ro; Yongdam-ro; Geonjimi-gil | Ansan City | Sangnok District | National Route 42 overlap Maesong IC (Under Seohaean Expressway) |
| No name | (이름 없음) | Haean-ro | Ansan City | Sangnok District | National Route 42 overlap |
| Bukgogae IS | 북고개삼거리 | Yongsin-ro | Ansan City | Sangnok District | National Route 42 overlap |
| No name | (이름 없음) | Ansandaehak-ro | Ansan City | Sangnok District | National Route 42 overlap |
| No name | (이름 없음) | Gulyong-ro | Ansan City | Sangnok District | National Route 42 overlap |
| Ansan Overpass IS | 안산육교 교차로 | National Route 42 (Suinsaneobdo-ro) | Ansan City | Sangnok District | National Route 42 overlap |
| Danwon Arts Museum IS | 단원미술관사거리 | Chungjang-ro | Ansan City | Sangnok District | |
| Ansan Bus Terminal Terminal IS | 안산종합버스터미널 (터미널사거리) | Hanggaul-ro | Ansan City | Sangnok District | |
| Jungang Station IS | 중앙역사거리 | Hanyangdaehak-ro; Yesuldaehak-ro | Ansan City | Danwon District | |
| Hanyang Building IS Jungang Underpass | 한양빌딩사거리 (중앙지하차도) | Gwangdeokdae-ro | Ansan City | Danwon District | |
| Asan Post Office IS | 안산우체국사거리 | Jeokgeum-ro | Ansan City | Danwon District | |
| Gojan Station IS | 고잔역삼거리 | Hwajeongcheondong-ro; Hwajeongcheonseo-ro | Ansan City | Danwon District | |
| Danwon District Office IS | 단원구청삼거리 | Choji-ro | Ansan City | Danwon District | |
| Choji Station IS Choji Station Underpass | 초지역사거리 (초지역지하차도) | Dongsan-ro | Ansan City | Danwon District | |
| Yeonsuwon IS | 연수원사거리 | Yeonsuwon-ro; Wonseon 1-ro | Ansan City | Danwon District | |
| Hyupsung Township IS | 협성연립삼거리 | Wonseon-ro | Ansan City | Danwon District | |
| Asan Station IS | 안산역삼거리 | Wongok-ro | Ansan City | Danwon District | |
| Asan Station IS Asan Station Underpass | 안산역사거리 (안산역지하차도) | Prefectural Route 84 (Jungangdae-ro); Sandan-ro | Ansan City | Danwon District | South Asan IC (Pyeongtaek–Siheung Expressway) |
| Samjeong Gas Station IS | 삼정주유소사거리 | Samil-ro | Ansan City | Danwon District | |
| Seonbu High School IS | 선부고교삼거리 | Jigok-ro | Ansan City | Danwon District | |
| West Asan IC Doil IS | 서안산 나들목 (도일사거리) | Yeongdong Expressway; Gunja-ro; Suhwan-ro | Ansan City | Danwon District | |
| Yeonseongyeok IS | 연성역삼거리 | Janghyeonneunggok-ro | Siheung City | Neunggok-dong | |
| Yeonseong IS | 연성삼거리 | Shiheungdae 412 beongil | Siheung City | Yeonseong-dong | |
| Sicheongibgu IS | 시청입구삼거리 | Sicheong-ro | Siheung City | Yeonseong-dong | |
| Siheung City Hall | 시흥시청역 | | Siheung City | Yeonseong-dong | |
| Dundae IS | 둔대교차로 | Dongseo-ro | Siheung City | Yeonseong-dong | |
| Yeonseong IC | 연성 나들목 | Prefectural Route 330 | Siheung City | Yeonseong-dong | |
| No name | (이름 없음) | Bilyudae-ro | Siheung City | Yeonseong-dong | |
| Podong IS | 포동사거리 | Hajung-ro | Siheung City | Maehwa-dong | |
| No name | (이름 없음) | Misan-ro | Siheung City | Sincheon-dong | |
| No name | (이름 없음) | Eunhaeng-ro | Siheung City | Eunhaeng-dong | |
| Bogeumjaliibgu IS | 복음자리입구 교차로 | National Route 42 (Suinsaneobdo-ro) | Siheung City | Sincheon-dong | National Route 42 overpass |
| Sincheon IS | 신천사거리 | Sincheon-ro | Siheung City | Sincheon-dong | National Route 42 overpass |
| Sincheon Overpass IS | 신천육교삼거리 | National Route 42 (Suinsaneobdo-ro) | Siheung City | Sincheon-dong | National Route 42 overpass |
| Solaecho Elementary School | 소래초등학교 | | Siheung City | Sincheon-dong | |
| Siheung Health Center | 시흥시보건소 | | Siheung City | Daeya-dong | |
| Daeya IS (5-way intersection) | 대야오거리 | Seohaean-ro; Bokji-ro 91beon-gil | Siheung City | Daeya-dong | Siheung IC; Under Seoul Ring Expressway |
| No name | (이름 없음) | Hau-ro | Siheung City | Daeya-dong | |
| Yeou Mountain Pass | 여우고개 | | Bucheon City | Sosa District | |
| Sosabon-dong Community Center | 소사본동주민센터 | | Bucheon City | Sosa District | |
| Sosa IS | 소사삼거리 | National Route 46 (Gyeongin-ro); Gyeonginyet-gil | Bucheon City | Sosa District | National Route 46 overlap |
| Somyeon Underpass | 소명지하차도 | Wonmi-ro | Bucheon City | Sosa District | National Route 46 overlap |
| Hau Pass Entrance | 하우고개입구 | Hau-ro | Bucheon City | Sosa District | National Route 46 overlap |
| Bucheon Station | 부천역 (부천역남부사거리) | Seongju-ro | Bucheon City | Sosa District | National Route 46 overlap |
| Simgokgoga IS | 심곡고가사거리 | National Route 46 (Gyeongin-ro) | Bucheon City | Sosa District | National Route 46 overlap |
| Telephone Office IS | 전화국사거리 | Buil-ro; Sinheung-ro | Bucheon City | Wonmi District | |
| Bucheon Station IS | 부천북부역사거리 | Buil-ro | Bucheon City | Wonmi District | |
| Jangmal IS | 장말삼거리 | Jangmal-ro | Bucheon City | Wonmi District | |
| Bokgaecheon IS | 복개천사거리 | Buheung-ro | Bucheon City | Wonmi District | |
| Wonmi District Office | 원미구청 | | Bucheon City | Wonmi District | |
| Jomaru IS | 조마루사거리 | Jomaru-ro | Bucheon City | Wonmi District | |
| Chunui Station Chunui IS | 춘의역 (춘의사거리) | Gilju-ro | Bucheon City | Wonmi District | |
| Dodang IS | 도당사거리 | Sudo-ro | Bucheon City | Wonmi District | |
| Naechon IS | 내촌사거리 | Bucheon-ro; Samjak-ro | Bucheon City | Ojeong District | |
| Sangojeong IS | 상오정삼거리 | Oksan-ro | Bucheon City | Ojeong District | |
| Naedong IS | 내동사거리 | Samjak-ro; Sinheung-ro | Bucheon City | Ojeong District | |
| Bucheon IC | 부천 나들목 | Gyeongin Expressway | Bucheon City | Ojeong District | |
| Saneop-gil IS | 산업길사거리 | National Route 6 National Route 77 (Ojeong-ro) | Bucheon City | Ojeong District | National Route 6 National Route 77 overlap |
| No name | (이름 없음) | National Route 6 National Route 77 (Ojeong-ro) | Bucheon City | Ojeong District | National Route 6 National Route 77 overlap |
| Public parking IS | 공영주차장삼거리 | Beolmal-ro | Bucheon City | Ojeong District | |
| Bakchon Bridge IS | 박촌교삼거리 | Gyeongmyeong-daero | Bucheon City | Ojeong District | |

=== Seoul - Gimpo - Incheon ===
| Name | Hangul name | Connection | Location | | Note |
|---|---|---|---|---|---|
| No name | (이름 없음) | Dongyang-ro | Seoul | Gangseo District | |
| Incheon Gyeyang Elementary School | 인천계양초등학교 상야분교 | | Incheon | Gyeyang District | |
| Susongdo-ro IS | 수송도로삼거리 | Deulim-ro | Gimpo | Gochon-eup | |
| Gochon IC | 고촌 나들목 | National Route 48; Gimpo-daero | Gimpo | Gochon-eup | |
| No name | (이름 없음) | Prefectural Route 78 (Geumpo-ro) | Gimpo | Gochon-eup | Prefectural Route 78 overlap |
| Gaehwa IC | 개화 나들목 | Olympic Boulevard Expressway; Seoul City Route 92 (Gaehwadong-ro); Gimpohangang-ro | Seoul | Gangseo District | Prefectural Route 78 overlap |
| Haengju Bridge | 행주대교 | | Seoul | Gangseo District | Prefectural Route 78 overlap |

=== Gyeonggi (North Seoul) ===
| Name | Hangul name | Connection | Location | | Note |
|---|---|---|---|---|---|
| Haengju Bridge | 행주대교 | | Goyang City | Deogyang District | Prefectural Route 78 overlap |
| Haengju Bridge IC | 행주대교 나들목 | National Route 77 (Jayu-ro) | Goyang City | Deogyang District | Prefectural Route 78 overlap |
| Haengjugoga IS | 행주고가 교차로 | Haengsin-ro; Haengju-ro | Goyang City | Deogyang District | Prefectural Route 78 overlap |
| Neunggok Overpass IS | 능곡육교앞 교차로 | Hosu-ro | Goyang City | Deogyang District | Prefectural Route 78 overlap |
| Todang Overpass IS | 토당육교 교차로 | Jungang-ro; Jido-ro | Goyang City | Deogyang District | Prefectural Route 78 overlap |
| Hwajeong IS (Hwajeong High School) | 화정고교앞삼거리 (화정고등학교) | Hwajeong-ro | Goyang City | Deogyang District | Prefectural Route 78 overlap |
| Myeongji Hospital | 명지병원 | | Goyang City | Deogyang District | Prefectural Route 78 overlap |
| Goyang SPART Complex & Park | 고양어울림누리 | | Goyang City | Deogyang District | Prefectural Route 78 overlap |
| Eoullimma-eup IS | 어울림마을앞 교차로 | Prefectural Route 356 (Goyangdae-ro) | Goyang City | Deogyang District | Prefectural Route 78 overlap |
| Seongsa Underpass IS | 성사지하차도입구 교차로 | Masang-ro | Goyang City | Deogyang District | Prefectural Route 78 overlap |
| No name | (이름 없음) | Chungjang-ro | Goyang City | Deogyang District | Prefectural Route 78 overlap |
| Nakta Mountain Pass IS | 낙타고개삼거리 | Wondang-ro | Goyang City | Deogyang District | Prefectural Route 78 overlap |
| Daeja IS | 대자삼거리 | National Route 1 (Tongil-ro) | Goyang City | Deogyang District | Prefectural Route 78 overlap |
| Byeokje Station | 벽제역 | | Goyang City | Deogyang District | Prefectural Route 78 overlap |
| Goyangdong Community Center | 고양동주민센터 | | Goyang City | Deogyang District | Prefectural Route 78 overlap |
| Goyang 2 IS | 고양2교앞 교차로 | Prefectural Route 78 (Dongheon-ro) | Goyang City | Deogyang District | Prefectural Route 78 overlap |
| Jangheung IS | 장흥 교차로 | Prefectural Route 371 (Gwonyul-ro) | Yangju City | Jangheung-myeon | |
| Olleung Songchu Underpass Songchu Bridge | 온릉 송추지하차도 송추교 | | Yangju City | Jangheung-myeon | |
| Songchu Checkpoint | (송추검문소) | Bukhansan-ro | Yangju City | Jangheung-myeon | |
| Songchu Elementary School | 송추초등학교 | | Yangju City | Jangheung-myeon | |
| Uldae Bridge | (울대교 남단) | Prefectural Route 39 (Gamagol-ro) | Yangju City | Jangheung-myeon | |
| Songchu Station | 송추역 | | Yangju City | Jangheung-myeon | |
| Gyeongming Square IS | 경민광장 교차로 | Seobu-ro; Hoguk-ro | Uijeongbu City | Ganeung-dong | |
| Ganeung IS | 가능삼거리 | Heungseon-ro | Uijeongbu City | Ganeung-dong | |
| Sinchon railway crossing IS | 신촌건널목 교차로 | Nogyang-ro; Uijeong-ro | Uijeongbu City | Ganeung-dong | |
| Uijeongbu Province Court | 의정부지방법원 | | Uijeongbu City | Ganeung-dong | |
| Ganeung IS | 가능 교차로 | National Route 3 (Pyeonghwa-ro) | Uijeongbu City | Ganeung-dong | Terminus |
