= Gayang Bridge =

Bridge in Seoul, South Korea

Coordinates: 37.5710°N 126.8623°E

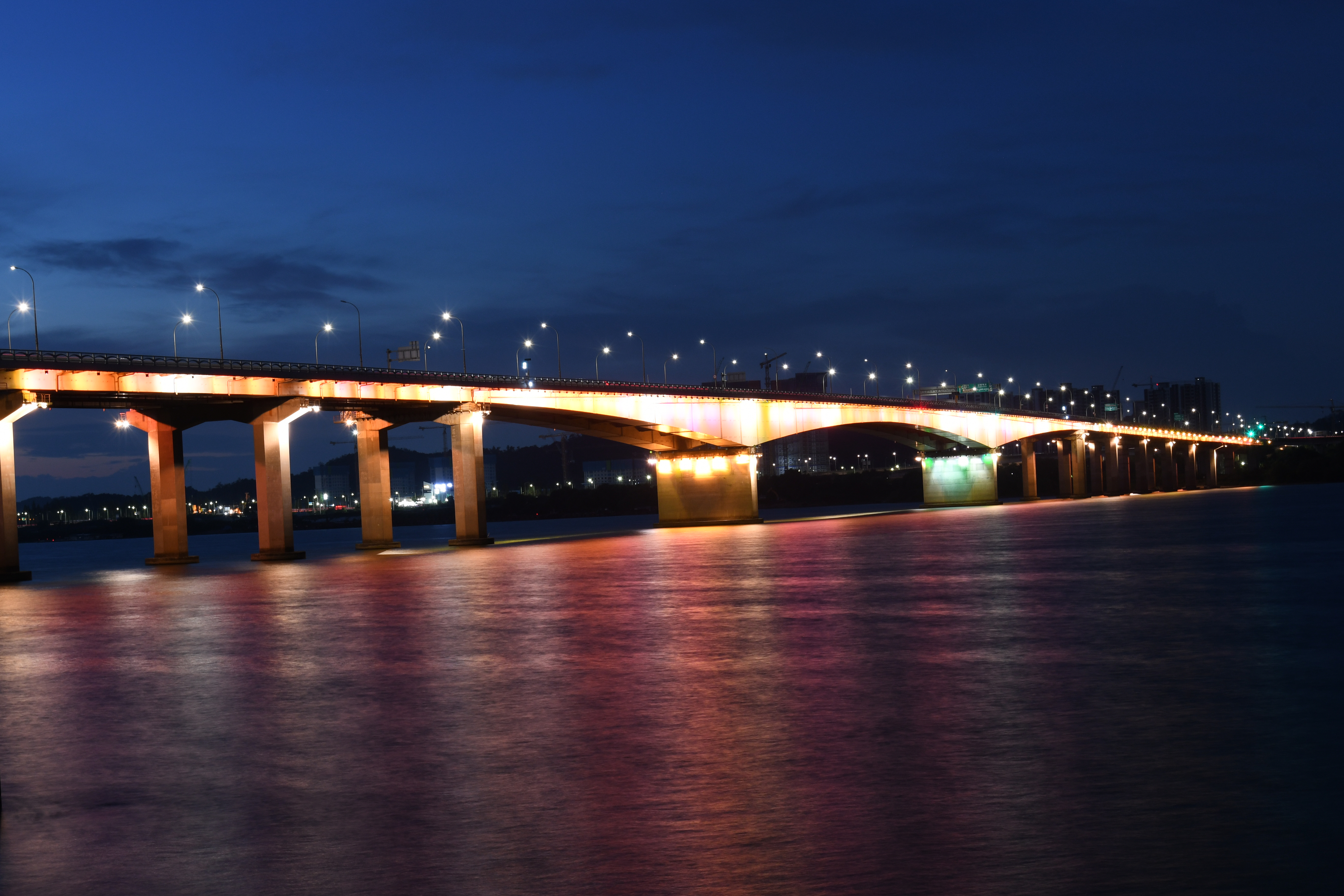

Korean name
- Hangul: 가양대교
- Hanja: 加陽大橋
- RR: Gayang daegyo
- MR: Kayang taegyo

The Gayang Bridge (Korean: 가양대교) is a bridge across the Han River in Seoul, South Korea. It connects Gangseo District and Mapo District. The bridge was completed in 2002.
