= Deogyang District =

District of Goyang, South Korea

- Non-autonomous District
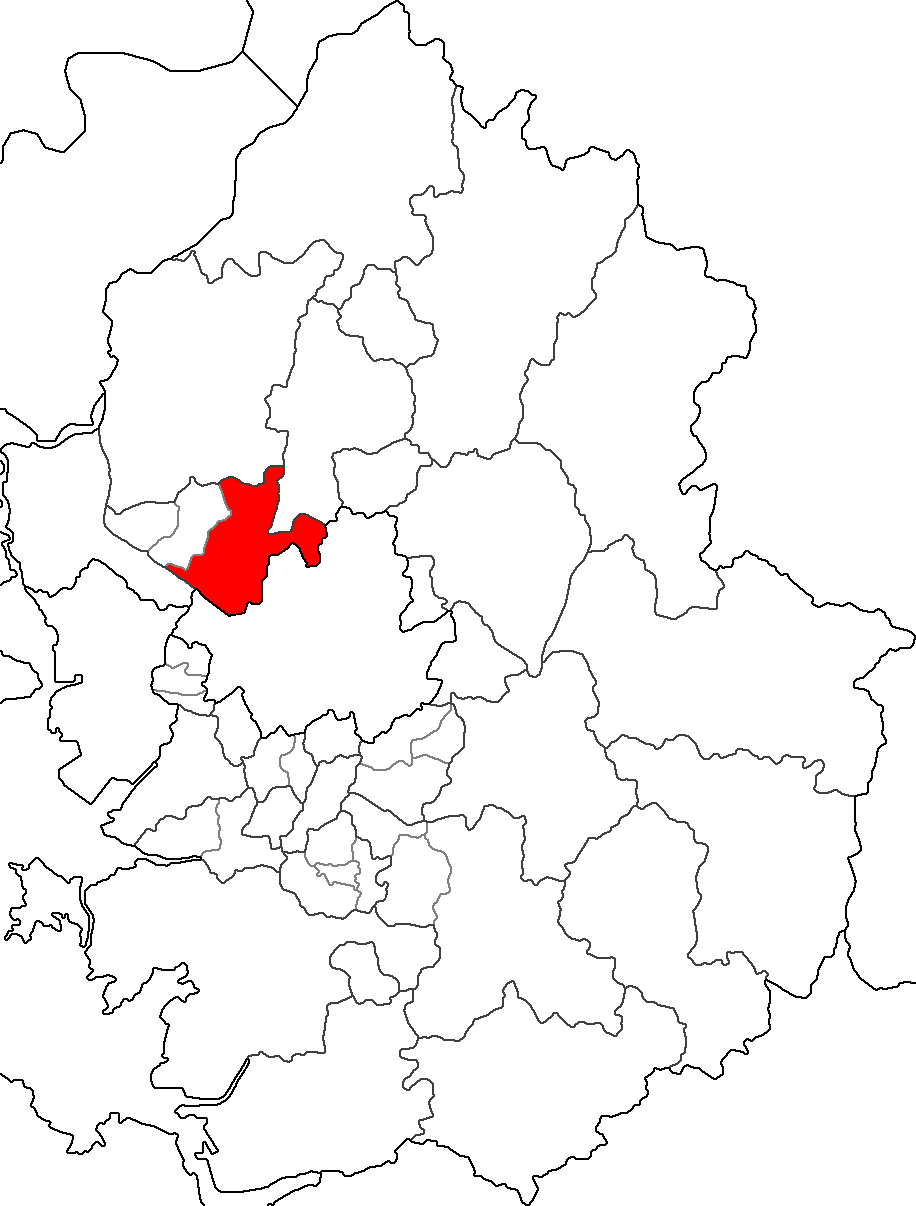
- Map of Gyeonggi highlighting Deogyang District.
- Country: South Korea
- Region: Sudogwon (Gijeon)
- Province: Gyeonggi
- City: Goyang
- Administrative divisions: 19 (Dong)

Area
  - Total: 165.53 km^{2} (63.91 sq mi)

Population
  - Total: 376,290
  - Dialect: Seoul
- Website: Deogyang District Office

Korean name
- Hangul: 덕양구
- Hanja: 德陽區
- RR: Deogyang-gu
- MR: Tŏgyang-gu

Deogyang District (Korean: 덕양구) is a gu (ward) in Goyang, South Korea.

== City information ==
The area is 165.49 km^{2} and the population is 385,387 (2008). It borders Jori-eup and Gwangtan-myeon of Paju to the north, Jangheung-myeon of Yangju and Dobong District and Eunpyeong District of Seoul to the east, Mapo District of Seoul and Gangseo-gu and Gochon-eup of Gimpo across the Han River to the south. The eastern part is a mountainous area centered on Mt. Bukhan, and most of the rest is a hilly mountainous area. A wide sedimentary plain developed around the Han River in the west and Gokneungcheon in the north, and the Changneungcheon in the south flows southwest and flows into the Han River.

Deogyang-gu is a district in the eastern part of Goyang, Gyeonggi Province. It is famous for its natural environment represented by Bukhansan Mountain and the Han River, as well as cultural assets such as the World Cultural Heritage Seosamneung and Seooreung, and the fortress Haengjusanseong. The name of the district is derived from 'Deogyang-hyeon', the old name of the Deogyang-gu area, and Haengjusanseong is located on the mountain Deogyangsan. Goyang City Hall is also located here.

== Administration ==
Deogyang District is divided into 19 dong (동, "neighborhoods"):

- Jugyo-dong
- Seongsa 1 and 2 dong
- Wonsin-dong (combination from Wondang-dong and Sinwon-dong)
- Heungdo-dong (combination from Wonheung-dong and Donae-dong)
- Sindo-dong (divided into Samsong-dong and Ogeum-dong)
- Changneung-dong (divided into Dongsan-dong and Yongdu-dong)
- Hyoja-dong (divided into Hyoja-dong, Jichuk-dong and Bukhan-dong)
- Hwajeon-dong (divided into Hwajeon-dong, Deogeun-dong and Hyangdong-dong)
- Daedeok-dong (contain Hyeoncheon-dong)
- Haengsin 1 to 3 dong (Haengsin 2-dong [Gangmae-dong])
- Haengju-dong (divided into Haengjunae-dong, Haengjuoe-dong, Todang-dong and Daejang-dong)
- Neunggok-dong (divided into Naegok-dong and Sinpyeong-dong)
- Hwajeong 1 and 2 dong
- Gwansan-dong (divided into Gwansan-dong and Naeyu-dong)
- Goyang-dong (divided into Goyang-dong, Byeokje-dong, Daeja-dong and Seonyu-dong )

== Incident ==
- Goyang Oil Tanker Explosion
