= Anyangcheon-ro =

South Korean road

Anyangcheon-ro
- 안양천로

Route information
- Length: 14.4 km (8.9 mi)
- Existed: 27 July 1993–present

Major junctions
- From: Soha-dong, Gwangmyeong, Gyeonggi Province
- To: Gangseo District, Seoul

Location
- Country: South Korea

Highway system
- Highway systems of South Korea; Expressways; National; Local

Anyangcheon-ro (Korean: 안양천로) is a road located in Seoul and Gyeonggi Province, South Korea. With a total length of 14.4 km (8.9 mi), this road starts from the Siheung Bridge Intersection in Soha-dong, Gwangmyeong to Yeomchang Interchange in Gangseo District, Seoul.

== Stopovers ==
Gyeonggi Province

- Gwangmyeong

Seoul

- Geumcheon District

Gyeonggi Province

- Gwangmyeong

Seoul

- Guro District - Yangcheon District - Gangseo District

== List of Facilities ==
IS: Intersection, IC: Interchange

Name	Hangul name	Connection	Location		Note
Connected with Pyeongtaek-Paju Expressway via Soha IC
Siheung Bridge IS	시흥대교 교차로	National Route 1 (Geumha-ro); Ttukbang-gil	Gwangmyeong	Soha-dong	National Route 1 overlap
Geumcheon IC	금천 나들목	Seohaean Expressway; National Route 1 (Seobu Ganseondoro)	Seoul	Geumcheon District	National Route 1 overlap
Hanshin Apartment	한신아파트	Hannae-ro	Seoul	Geumcheon District	
Haannam Elementary School IS	하안남초교삼거리	Geumdang-ro	Gwangmyeong	Haan-dong	
Geumcheon Bridge IS (Gwangmyeong Haan Underpass)	금천교 교차로 (광명하안지하차도)	Beoman-ro	Seoul	Geumcheon District	
Haan Drainage Pumping Station IS	하안배수펌프장삼거리	Anhyeon-ro	Gwangmyeong	Haan-dong	
Jinsung High School IS	진성고삼거리	Cheolmangsan-ro	Gwangmyeong	Haan-dong	
Cheolsan Bridge IS (Cheolsan Underpass)	철산대교사거리 (철산지하차도)	Digital-ro	Gwangmyeong	Cheolsan-dong	
Kwangseong Elementary School Entrance IS	광성초교입구삼거리	Cheolsan-ro	Gwangmyeong	Cheolsan-dong	
Cheolsanjugong IS	철산주공삼거리	Mose-ro	Gwangmyeong	Cheolsan-dong	
Gwangmyeong Bridge IS (Gwangmyeong Underpass)	광명대교사거리 (광명지하차도)	Gamasan-ro	Gwangmyeong	Cheolsan-dong	
Woosung Apartment Entrance IS	우성아파트입구삼거리	Sicheong-ro	Gwangmyeong	Cheolsan-dong	
Gwangmyeong Elevated Road (South side)	광명고가도로 남단	Mokgam-ro; Annyangcheon-ro 502beon-gil	Gwangmyeong	Cheolsan-dong	
Gwangmyeong Elevated Road	광명고가도로		Gwangmyeong	Cheolsan-dong	
Gwangmyeong Elevated Road			Seoul	Guro District	
Dongyang Mirae University IS (Gocheok Underpass)	동양미래대학교앞 교차로 (고척지하차도)	National Route 46 (Gyeongin-ro)	Seoul	Guro District	
Ogeum Bridge IS (Ogeum Underpass)	오금교 교차로 (오금지하차도)	Mokdong-ro	Seoul	Yangcheon District	
Mokil Middle School IS	목일중학교앞 교차로	Mokdongdong-ro 8-gil	Seoul	Yangcheon District	
(West Sinjeong Bridge)	(신정교 서단)	Dorimcheon-ro; Sinmok-ro	Seoul	Yangcheon District	
(West Omok Bridge)	(오목교 서단)	Omok-ro	Seoul	Yangcheon District	
Omok Rainwater Pumping Station	오목빗물펌프장	Mokdongdong-ro; Sinmok-ro	Seoul	Yangcheon District	
Mokdong Bridge	목동교 서단	Gukhoe-daero	Seoul	Yangcheon District	
Mokma Park IS	목마공원 교차로	Mokdongdong-ro	Seoul	Yangcheon District	
Cogeneration Plant IS	열병합발전소앞 교차로	Mokdongseo-ro	Seoul	Yangcheon District	
Sinmok-dong Station	신목동역	Mokdongjungang-ro	Seoul	Yangcheon District	
Yanghwa Bridge IS	양화교 교차로	National Route 6 National Route 48; National Route 77 (Gonghang-daero) (Nodeul-ro); Yangcheon-ro	Seoul	Yangcheon District	
Yanghwa Bridge IS	양화교 교차로	National Route 6 National Route 48; National Route 77 (Gonghang-daero) (Nodeul-ro); Yangcheon-ro	Seoul	Gangseo District	
Yeomchang IC	염창 나들목	Olympic-daero	Seoul	Gangseo District	
