= Soha Junction =

Soha Junction 소하 분기점 (Soha Bungijeom)
- Interactive map of Soha Junction 소하 분기점 (Soha Bungijeom)

Location
- Soha-dong, Gwangmyeong, Gyeonggi, South Korea
- Coordinates: 37°27′33.93″N 126°53′28.65″E
- Roads at junction: Seohaean Expressway; Suwon–Munsan Expressway; Gangnamsunhwan-ro

Construction
- Type: Turbine interchange
- Constructed: 2011–2016
- Opened: July 3, 2016
- Maintained by: the Korea Expressway Corporation; Metropolitan Western Expressway Corporation

The Soha Junction(소하 분기점, romanised: soha bungijeom) is a junction of the Seohaean Expressway, Suwon–Munsan Expressway, and the Gangnamsunhwan-ro in Soha-dong, Gwangmyeong, Gyeonggi Province, Republic of Korea.

== Roads ==
Seohaean Expressway
toward Mokpo	←	37; Soha Junction	→	toward Seoul
36; Iljik Junction	←	37; Soha Junction	→	38; Geumcheon IC
Suwon–Munsan Expressway (Gwangmyeong ~ Soha Branch)
toward Suwon	←	6 Soha Junction	→	toward Gwangmyeong
TG; S. Gwangmyeong TG	←	6 Soha Junction	→	Ending Point
Gangnamsunhwan-ro
toward Geumcheon	←	Soha Junction	→	toward Gangnam
Start Point	←	Soha Junction	→	Geumcheon R.

== History ==
- July 3, 2016: The junction was opened along with Gangnamsunhwan-ro.
