= Gukhoe-daero =

Highway in Seoul, South Korea

- 국회대로

Route information
- Length: 8.4 km (5.2 mi)
- Existed: 1986–present

Major junctions
- From: Yangcheon District, Seoul
- To: Mapo District, Seoul

Location
- Country: South Korea

Highway system
- Highway systems of South Korea; Expressways; National; Local

Gukhoe-daero (Korean: 국회대로, lit. Parliament Boulevard) is an eight-lane highway located in Seoul, South Korea. With a total length of 8.4 km (5.2 mi), this road starts from the Sinwol Interchange in Yangcheon District, Seoul to Seogang Bridge in Mapo District. The route is a part of Seoul City Route 46 and Seoul City Route 49.

== History ==
This route was established on 15 September 1986.

== Stopovers ==
Seoul

- Yangcheon District - Gangseo District - Yeongdeungpo District - Mapo District

== List of facilities ==
IS: Intersection, IC: Interchange

- (■): Motorway section

Name	Hangul name	Connection	Location		Note
Connected with Gyeongin Expressway
Sinwol IC	신월 나들목	Seoul City Route 92 (Nambu Beltway)	Seoul	Yangcheon District	Start point
Sinwol Overpass	신월차도육교	Woljeong-ro	Seoul	Yangcheon District	Yeouido-bound Only
Sinwol Overpass		Woljeong-ro	Seoul	North:Gangseo District; South:Yangcheon District	Yeouido-bound Only
Hwagokgoga IS (Hwagok Underpass)	화곡고가사거리 (화곡지하차도)	Gangseo-ro; Jungang-ro	Seoul	North:Gangseo District; South:Yangcheon District	
(Yangjeong Gas Station)	(양정주유소)	Sinjeongjungang-ro	Seoul	North:Gangseo District; South:Yangcheon District	Yeouido-bound Only
Former Mokdong Toolgate	구 목동 요금소		Seoul	North:Gangseo District; South:Yangcheon District	Sinwol-bound Only
Hongik Hospital IS (Gyeongin Underpass)	홍익병원앞 교차로 (경인지하차도)	Deungchon-ro; Mokdong-ro	Seoul	North:Gangseo District; South:Yangcheon District	
Hongik Hospital IS (Gyeongin Underpass)		Deungchon-ro; Mokdong-ro	Seoul	Yangcheon District	
Youth Center IS	청소년수련관 교차로	Mokdongseo-ro	Seoul	Yangcheon District	Gyeongin Underpass section Broken road
Yangcheon Post Office IS	양천우체국 교차로	Mokdongdong-ro	Seoul	Yangcheon District	Gyeongin Underpass section Broken road
West of Mokdong Bridge	목동교 서단	Anyangcheon-ro	Seoul	Yangcheon District	
Mokdong Bridge	목동교		Seoul	Yangcheon District	
Mokdong Bridge			Seoul	Yeongdeungpo District	
Mokdong Bridge IS	목동교 교차로	National Route 1 (Seobu Expressway)	Seoul	Yeongdeungpo District	
Gyeongin Expressway Entrance IS (Seonyu Elevated Road)	경인고속입구 교차로 (선유고가도로)	Seonyu-ro	Seoul	Yeongdeungpo District	
Yeongdeungpo-gu Office IS	영등포구청앞 교차로	Dangsan-ro	Seoul	Yeongdeungpo District	
Yeongdeungpo Police Station IS	영등포경찰서 교차로	Yeongsin-ro	Seoul	Yeongdeungpo District	
Yeongdeungpo Telephone Office IS	영등포전화국 교차로	Yeongjung-ro	Seoul	Yeongdeungpo District	
Seoul Nambu District Office of Education IS	남부교육청앞 교차로	Beodeunaru-ro	Seoul	Yeongdeungpo District	
Yeoui 2 Bridge IS	여의2교 교차로	Nodeul-ro	Seoul	Yeongdeungpo District	
Yeoui 2 Bridge	여의2교		Seoul	Yeongdeungpo District	
Senate Office IS	의원회관앞 교차로	Yeouiseo-ro	Seoul	Yeongdeungpo District	
National Assembly Hall IS (National Assembly Station)	국회의사당앞 교차로 (국회의사당역)	Uisadang-daero	Seoul	Yeongdeungpo District	
South of Seogang Bridge IS	서강대교남단사거리	Yeouiseo-ro	Seoul	Yeongdeungpo District	
Seogang Bridge	서강대교		Seoul	Yeongdeungpo District	
Seogang Bridge			Seoul	Mapo District	
North of Seogang Bridge	서강대교북단	Local Route 23; Seoul City Route 70 (Gangbyeonbuk-ro)	Seoul	Mapo District	
Connected with Seogang Bridge
