= Iljik Junction =

Iljik Junction 일직 분기점
- Interactive map of Iljik Junction 일직 분기점

Location
- Iljik-dong, Gwangmyeong, Gyeonggi, South Korea
- Coordinates: 37°25′25.77″N 126°53′41.56″E
- Roads at junction: Seohaean Expressway; 2nd Gyeongin Expressway

Construction
- Type: Turbine interchange
- Constructed: 1991-1995
- Opened: December 28, 1995
- Maintained by: the Korea Expressway Corporation

- Iljik Junction
- Hangul: 일직분기점
- Hanja: 日直分岐點
- Revised Romanization: Iljik Bungijeom
- McCune–Reischauer: Iljik Pungijŏm

The Iljik Junction (Korean: 일직 분기점; Iljik Bungijeom) is a road junction located in Gwangmyeong, Gyeonggi, Republic of Korea.

Seohaean Expressway and Second Gyeongin Expressway intersect at this junction.

== Roads ==
Seohaean Expressway
toward Mokpo	←	36; Iljik Junction	→	toward Seoul
35; Gwangmyeong; Stn. IC; 2.67 km	←	36; Iljik Junction	→	37; Soha JC; 4.20 km
2nd Gyeongin Expressway
toward Incheon	←	13; Iljik Junction	→	toward Seongnam
12; Gwangmyeong IC; 4.37 km	←	13; Iljik Junction	→	14; Seoksu IC; 1.02 km

== History ==
- March 22, 1991: The existing construction plan for the Iljik Interchange was changed to create a new junction, and the Iljik Junction was announced.
- December 31, 1992: The 740m section of road from Seoksu-dong, Anyang-si, Gyeonggi-do to Iljik-dong, Gwangmyeong-si was decided for the construction of a junction.
- December 28, 1995: Opens to traffic.
