= Seobu Ganseondoro =

Highway in Seoul, South Korea

National Route 1
- Seobu Urban Expressay 서부 간선 도로

Route information
- Length: 16.84 km (10.46 mi)
- Existed: 1987–present

Major junctions
- South end: Geumcheon IC, Geumcheon-gu
- Gukhoe-daero; Olympicdaero; Gangbyeon Expressway
- North end: Seongsan Br. JCT, Yeongdeungpo-gu

Location
- Country: South Korea

Highway system
- Highway systems of South Korea; Expressways; National; Local

The Seobu Urban Expressway (Korean: 서부 간선 도로; Seobu Ganseon Doro) is 4-lane highway located in Seoul, South Korea. It is part of National Route 1.

This route connect Seohaean Expressway (Geumcheon Interchange) to Mapo District (Seongsan Bridge), with a total length of 9.8 km (6.1 mi).

The highway is linked to the southwestern Metropolitan area, including Seoul and Anyang, light serves to facilitate transporting the cargo volume and alleviate traffic congestion in the metropolitan area southwest.

== History ==
The expressway was built between 1987 and 1991.

== Compositions ==
=== Lanes ===
- Geumcheon IC ~ Mokdonggyo IC: 4
- Mokdonggyo IC ~ Seongsan Bridge: 6

=== Length ===
9.8 km (6.1 mi)

=== Speed Limits ===
- Geumcheon IC ~ Seongsan Bridge: 80 km/h
- Seongsan Bridge ~ Seongsan IC: 60 km/h

== List of facilities ==
- IC: Interchange, JC: Junction, SA: Service Area, TG: Tollgate

No.	Name	Korean name	Hanja name	Connections	Notes	Location	
Connected directly with Seohaean Expressway (서해안고속도로)
IC	Geumcheon IC	금천나들목	衿川나들목	Seohaean Expressway; National Route 1 Doksan Station ( Line 1)	Highway Start Spot	Geumcheon	Seoul
IC	Geumcheon Br. IC	금천교교차로	衿川橋交叉路	Beoman-ro (범안로)	Geumcheon-bound Only	Geumcheon	Seoul
IC	Cheolsan Br. IC	철산교교차로	鐵山橋交叉路	Digital-ro (디지털로)		Geumcheon	Seoul
IC	Gwangmyeong Br. IC	광명교교차로	光明橋交叉路	Gamasan-ro (가마산로)		Geumcheon	Seoul
IC	Guil Pri. Sch. IC	구일초교나들목	九一初校앞 交叉路	Guil-ro (구일로)	Seongsan-bound Only	Guro	Seoul
IC	Gocheok Br. IC	고척교교차로	高尺橋交叉路	National Route 46		Guro	Seoul
IC	Ogeum Br. IC	오금교교차로	梧琴橋交叉路	Mokdong-ro (목동로)		Guro	Seoul
IC	Sinjeong Br. IC	신정교교차로	新亭橋交叉路	Dorimcheon-ro (도림천로)		Yeongdeungpo	Seoul
IC	Omok Br. IC	오목교교차로	木洞橋交叉路	Gukhoe-daero (국회대로) ( Gyeongin Expressway); Omokgyo Station ( Line 5)		Yeongdeungpo	Seoul
IC	Yangpyeong Br. IC	양평교교차로	楊坪橋交叉路	Yangpyeong-ro (양평로)		Yeongdeungpo	Seoul
IC	Seongsan Br. IC	성산대교남단	城山大橋南端	Olympicdaero (올림픽대로); National Route 6 National Route 48; National Route 77		Yeongdeungpo	Seoul
BR	Seongsan Bridge	성산대교	城山大橋		L=1,410m		Seoul
IC	Seongsan IC	성산대교북단	城山大橋北端	Gangbyeon Expressway (강변북로); National Route 48; National Route 77		Mapo	Seoul
IC	Naebu Expressway Entrance	내부순환로입구	內部循環路入口	National Route 1 (Nongsusansijang-ro) (농수산시장로); Naebu Expressway		Mapo	Seoul
IC	Sacheon Br. IC	사천교 교차로	泗川橋交叉路	Seoul City Route 50 (Susaek-ro) (수색로)	Moraenae Elevated Road section	Mapo	Seoul
Connected directly with Seongsan-ro (성산로)

== See also ==
- List of streets in Seoul
- Dongbu Urban Expressway
