= Seohaean Expressway =

Road in South Korea

Expressway No.15
- Seohaean Expressway 서해안고속도로

Route information
- Length: 346.1 km (215.1 mi)
- Existed: 1994–present

Major junctions
- South end: Mokpo, Jeonnam Province (Mokpo IC); National Route 1
- Expressway No.10 Namhae Expressway; Expressway No.12 Muan-Gwangju Expressway; Expressway No.253 Gochang-Damyang Expressway; Expressway No.151 Seocheon-Gongju Expressway; Expressway No.30 Dangjin-Yeongdeok Expressway; Expressway No.153 Pyeongtaek-Siheung Expressway; Expressway No.40 Pyeongtaek-Jecheon Expressway; Expressway No.50 Yeongdong Expressway; Expressway No.100 Seoul Ring Expressway; Expressway No.110 Second Gyeongin Expressway
- North end: Geumcheon, Seoul (Geumcheon IC); National Route 1

Location
- Country: South Korea
- Major cities: Gimje, Gunsan, Boryeong, Seosan, Dangjin, Pyeongtaek, Hwaseong, Ansan, Anyang

Highway system
- Highway systems of South Korea; Expressways; National; Local

- Seohaean Expressway
- Hangul: 서해안고속도로
- Hanja: 西海岸高速道路
- RR: Seohaean gosok doro
- MR: Sŏhaean kosok toro

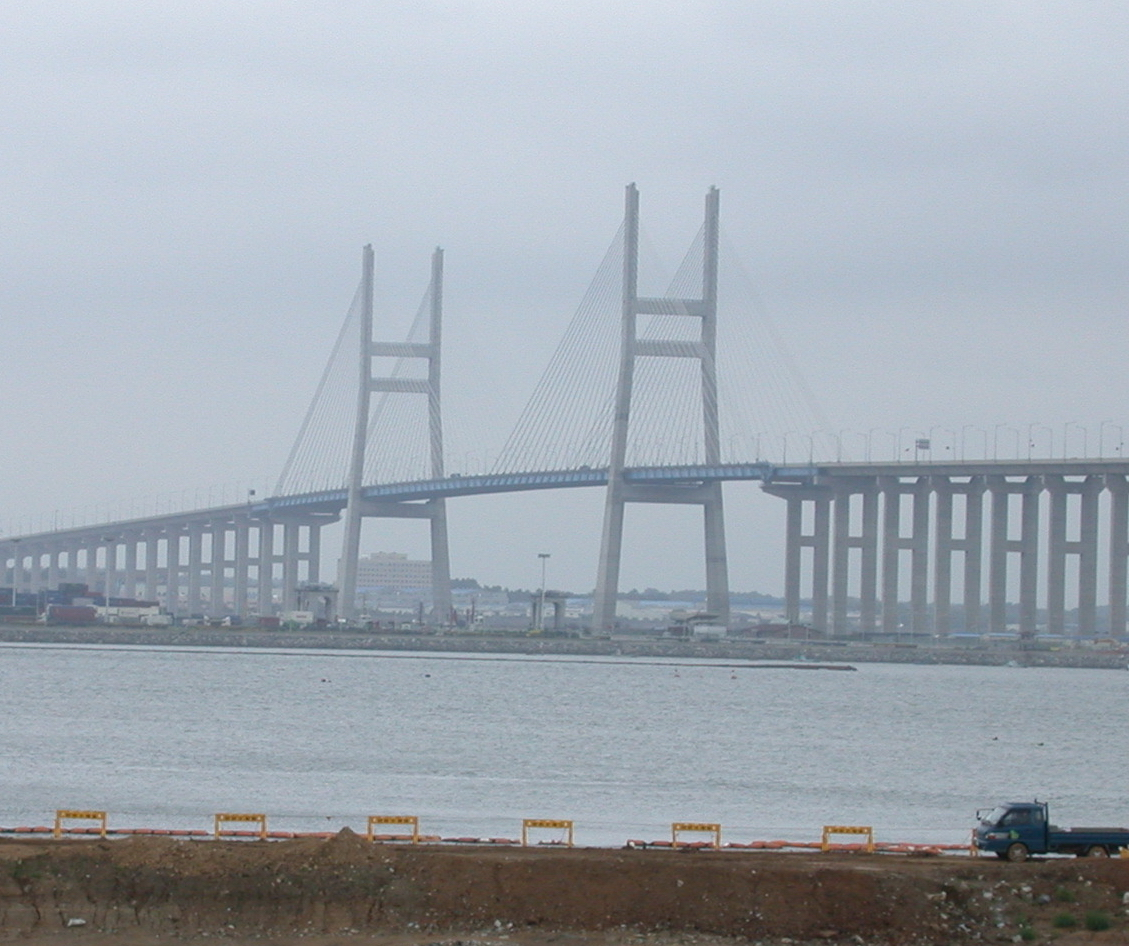
Seohae Bridge

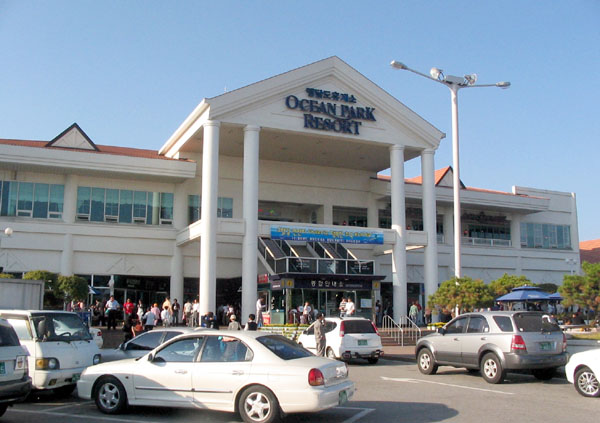
Haengdamdo Service Area

The Seohaean Expressway (Korean: 서해안고속도로) is a freeway in South Korea, connecting Mokpo to Gunsan, Dangjin, and Seoul.

It is numbered 15. The entire length from Seoul to Mokpo is 345 km and the posted speed limit is 110 km/h, enforced primarily by speed cameras. It is connected of Seohae Grand Bridge in Pyeongtaek to Dangjin.

The branch expressways of the Seohaean Expressway are Seocheon–Gongju Expressway and Pyeongtaek–Siheung Expressway.

Typical facilities of this expressway is Seohae Bridge(Korean: 서해대교; Seohae Daegyo) which the total length of 7.3 km linking the Pyeongtaek(Gyeonggi Province) and Dangjin(Chungnam Province). The bridge is the third long bridge in the Republic of Korea.

The highway is a major highway linking the Seohaean Region(서해안권) for the first north–south axis (남북 제1축), the road through the South Jeolla Province, North Jeolla Province, South Chungcheong Province, Gyeonggi Province.

== History ==
- December 1991 – Construction begin
- May 1993 – Construction begin of Seohae Grand Bridge
- 6 July 1994 – Seoul–Ansan segment opened to traffic.
- 17 December 1996 – Ansan–Pyeongtaek segment opened to traffic.
- 25 August 1998 – Mokpo–Muan segment opened to traffic.
- 30 October 1998 – Gunsan–Seocheon segment opened to traffic.
- 10 November 2000 – Seohae Grand Bridge segment opened to traffic. and Pyeongtaek–Dangjin segment opened to traffic.
- 27 September 2001 – Dangjin–Seocheon segment opened to traffic.
- 21 December 2001 – The last segment, Gunsan–Muan segment opened to traffic.
- 30 July 2010 – Work begins to widen to 8 lanes in Ansan–Iljik Junction.
- 23 November 2011 – Jungnim Junction opened to traffic.
- October 2014 – Seohae Bridge – W. Pyeongtaek Junction Section (10.3 km) road expansion started construction.
- November 2014 – The 10-lane expansion of the Ansan JCT – Jonam JCT (2.9 km) section was completed.
- June 2015 – The 10-lane expansion of the Jonam JCT – Mokgam IC (3.2 km) section was completed.
- 23 December 2015 – The 10-lane expansion of the Mokgam IC – Iljik JCT (3.8 km) section was completed.
- 3 July 2016 – Soha Junction opened to traffic.

== Compositions ==
=== Lanes ===
- Mokpo IC – Dangjin JC, Iljik JC-West Seoul End: 4
- Dangjin JC – Bibong IC, Maesong IC-Ansan JC, Jonam JC–Mokgam IC: 6
- Mokgam IC – Iljik JC, Bibong IC – Maesong IC, West Seoul TG-Jonam JC: 8
- Ansan-Iljik, Yangjae-Giheung, unjung Bridge and Seoul Ring Road (Rigid Pavement) 130 km JC – : 10

=== Length ===
346.1 kilometres (215.1 mi)

=== Speed limits ===
- Jungnim JC – Maesong IC : 110 km/h (68 mph)
- Maesong IC – Seoul(Geumcheon) : 100 km/h (62 mph)
- Mokpo – Jungnim JC : 90 km/h (56 mph)

== Interchange lists ==
Legend:

- I/C - Interchange, I/S - Intersection, RSA - Rest and service area, OBR - Overhead bridge restaurant, R/R - Restaurant and rest plaza, L/B - Layby, V/P - Vista point, TN - tunnel, T/P - Toll plaza, BR - Bridge
- C - Cloverleaf, S - Stack, T-A - Trumpet-A, T-B - Trumpet-B, DT - Directional-T/Y, SDT - Semi-Directional-T/Y, P-Y - Partial-Y, D - Diamond, P-C - Partial cloverleaf, D-D - Diverging diamond, D-R - Direct ramp

Province	Location	km		Exit	Name	Korean name	Hanja name	Connections	Notes
Connected directly to Seobu Ganseondoro (서부간선도로)
Seoul	Geumcheon	0.65	340.81		Seoul	서울 종점	서울 終點	Seobu Urban Expressway	
Seoul	Geumcheon	4.20	340.16	38	Geumcheon IC	금천나들목	衿川나들목	National Route 1 Doksan Station ( Line 1)	Seoul-bound enter only Mokpo-bound exit only
Seoul	Geumcheon			37	Soha JC	소하분기점	所下分岐點	Suwon-Munsan Expressway; Gangnam Beltway	Gangnam-bound only Mokpo-bound only
Gyeonggi	Gwangmyeong	2.67	335.96	36	Iljik JC	일직분기점	日直分岐點	2nd Gyeongin Expressway	
Gyeonggi	Anyang	3.15	333.29	35	Gwangmyeong Stn. IC	광명역나들목	光明驛나들목	Ori-ro; KTX Gwangmyeong Stn.	
Gyeonggi	Siheung	3.16	332.14	34	Mokgam IC	목감나들목	牧甘나들목	National Route 42; Suwon–Munsan Expressway; 3rd Gyeongin Highway	
Gyeonggi	Siheung			SA	Mokgam SA	목감간이휴게소	牧甘簡易休憩所		Seoul-bound only
Gyeonggi	Siheung	2.89	328.98	33	Jonam JC	조남분기점	鳥南分岐點	Capital Region First Ring Expressway	
Gyeonggi	Ansan			TG	W. Seoul TG	서서울요금소	西서울料金所		Main Tollgate
Gyeonggi	Ansan	5.12	326.09	32	Ansan JC	안산분기점	安山分岐點	Yeongdong Expressway	
Gyeonggi	Ansan	3.80	320.97	31-1	Palgok JC	팔곡분기점	八谷分岐點	Yeongdong Expressway	Mokpo-bound enter only Gangneung-bound exit only
Gyeonggi	Hwaseong	4.02	317.17	31	Maesong IC	매송나들목	梅松나들목	Local Route 84	
Gyeonggi	Hwaseong			SA	Maesong SA	매송휴게소	梅松休憩所		
Gyeonggi	Hwaseong	13.62	313.15	30	Bibong IC	비봉나들목	飛鳳나들목	National Route 39	
Gyeonggi	Hwaseong			SA	Hwaseong SA	화성휴게소	華城休憩所		
Gyeonggi	Hwaseong			29-1	Paltan JC	팔탄분기점	八灘分岐點	Capital Region Second Ring Expressway	
Gyeonggi	Hwaseong	7.82	299.53	29	Baran IC	발안나들목	發安나들목	National Route 39	
Gyeonggi	Pyeongtaek	6.53	291.71	28	W Pyeongtaek JC	서평택분기점	西平澤分岐點	Pyeongtaek–Jecheon Expressway; Pyeongtaek-Siheung Expressway	
Gyeonggi	Pyeongtaek	12.64	285.18	27	W Pyeongtaek IC	서평택나들목	西平澤나들목	National Route 82	
Gyeonggi	Pyeongtaek			27-1	Poseung JC	포승분기점	浦升分岐點	Iksan–Pyeongtaek Expressway Branch	
Gyeonggi	Pyeongtaek			BR	Seohae Bridge	서해대교	西海大橋		
Chungnam	Dangjin			SA	Haengdam Island SA (Ocean Park Resort)	행담도휴게소	行淡島休憩所		In the Seohae Grand Bridge
Chungnam	Dangjin	8.07	272.54	26	Songak IC	송악나들목	松岳나들목	National Route 38; Dangjin Steelworks	
Chungnam	Dangjin	9.39	264.47	25	Dangjin IC	당진나들목	唐津나들목	National Route 34	
Chungnam	Dangjin	6.56	255.08	24	Dangjin JC	당진분기점	唐津分岐點	Dangjin-Yeongdeok Expressway	
Chungnam	Seosan	10.78	248.52	23	Seosan IC	서산나들목	西山나들목	National Route 32	
Chungnam	Seosan			SA	Seosan SA	서산휴게소	西山休憩所		
Chungnam	Seosan	13.68	237.80	22	Haemi IC	해미나들목	海美나들목	National Route 45; Haemieupseong	
Chungnam	Hongseong	10.80	224.12	21	Hongseong IC	홍성나들목	洪城나들목	National Route 29	
Chungnam	Hongseong			SA	Hongseong SA	홍성휴게소	洪城休憩所		
Chungnam	Hongseong	19.72	213.32	20	Gwangcheon IC	광천나들목	廣川나들목	Local Route 96	
Chungnam	Boryeong			SA	Daecheon SA	대천휴게소	大川休憩所		
Chungnam	Boryeong	11.99	193.60	19	Daecheon IC	대천나들목	大川나들목	National Route 36; Daecheon Beach	
Chungnam	Boryeong	8.71	181.61	18	Muchangpo IC	무창포나들목	武昌浦나들목	Local Route 606	
Chungnam	Seocheon	11.91	172.90	17	Chunjangdae IC	춘장대나들목	春長臺나들목	National Route 21	
Chungnam	Seocheon			SA	Seocheon SA	서천휴게소	舒川休憩所		
Chungnam	Seocheon	8.98	160.99	16	Seocheon IC	서천나들목	舒川나들목	National Route 4	
Chungnam	Seocheon	6.23	152.01	15	E Seocheon JC	동서천분기점	東舒川分岐點	Seocheon-Gongju Expressway	
Jeonbuk	Gunsan			SA	Gunsan SA	군산휴게소	群山休憩所		Seoul-bound only
Jeonbuk	Gunsan	8.40	145.78	14	Gunsan IC	군산나들목	群山나들목	National Route 21	
Jeonbuk	Gunsan			SA	Gunsan SA	군산휴게소	群山休憩所		Mokpo-bound only
Jeonbuk	Gunsan	12.55	137.38	13	E Gunsan IC	동군산나들목	東群山나들목	National Route 21; National Route 26; National Route 29	
Jeonbuk	Gimje			12-1	Gimje JC	김제 분기점	金堤分岐點	Saemangeum-Pohang Expressway	
Jeonbuk	Gimje	13.93	124.83	12	W Gimje IC	서김제나들목	西金堤나들목	National Route 29	
Jeonbuk	Buan	16.18	110.90	11	Buan IC	부안나들목	扶安나들목	National Route 30	
Jeonbuk	Buan	9.87	94.72	10	Julpo IC	줄포나들목	茁浦나들목	Local Route 710	
Jeonbuk	Gochang	7.91	84.85	9	Seonunsan IC	선운산나들목	禪雲山나들목	National Route 22; Seonunsa	
Jeonbuk	Gochang			SA	Gochang Goindol SA	고창고인돌휴게소	高敞고인돌休憩所		
Jeonbuk	Gochang	2.74	76.94	8	Gochang IC	고창나들목	高敞나들목	Local Route 15	
Jeonbuk	Gochang	16.06	74.20	7	Gochang JC	고창분기점	高敞分岐點	Gochang-Damyang Expressway	
Jeonbuk	Gochang			SA	Daesan SA	대산휴게소	大山休憩所		Seoul-bound only (temporary rest area, no gas station)
Jeonnam	Yeonggwang	24.33	58.14	6	Yeonggwang IC	영광나들목	靈光나들목	National Route 23	
Jeonnam	Yeonggwang			5-1 SA	Bulgapsan Yeonggwang SA	부안고려청자휴게소			Muan-bound only (temporary rest area, no gas station); Hi-pass exclusive interchange
Jeonnam	Hampyeong			SA	Hampyeong -cheonji SA	함평천지휴게소	咸平天地休憩所		Seoul-bound only
Jeonnam	Hampyeong	7.81	33.81	5	Hampyeong IC	함평나들목	咸平나들목	National Route 23	
Jeonnam	Hampyeong			SA	Hampyeong -cheonji SA	함평천지휴게소	咸平天地休憩所		Mokpo-bound only
Jeonnam	Hampyeong	2.46	26.00	4	Hampyeong JC	함평분기점	咸平分岐點	Muan-Gwangju Expressway; Muan International Airport	
Jeonnam	Muan	17.28	23.54	3	Muan IC	무안나들목	務安나들목	National Route 1	
Jeonnam	Muan			TG	Mokpo TG	목포요금소	木浦料金所		Main Tollgate
Jeonnam	Muan	2.10	6.26	2	Illo IC	일로나들목	一老나들목	Local Route 815	
Jeonnam	Muan	3.90	4.16		Jungnim JC	죽림분기점	竹林分岐點	Namhae Expressway (Mokpo–Gwangyang); National Route 2 Jeonnam Provincial Office; Mokpo Airport	
Jeonnam	Mokpo	0.26	0.26	1	Mokpo IC	목포나들목	木浦나들목	National Route 1 (Yeongsan-ro)	
Jeonnam	Mokpo	–	0.0		Mokpo	목포 시점	木浦 始點	National Route 1 National Route 2 Mokpo Bridge; Aphae Bridge	
Connected directly to National Route 1, National Route 2 (Goha-daero) (고하대로)

== Events ==
MBC's Entertainment program, Infinite Challenge held a Seohaean Expressway Festival in Haengdam Island Service area in June 2011.

== See also ==
- Roads and expressways in South Korea
- Transportation in South Korea
