= Pyeongtaek–Siheung Expressway =

Road in South Korea

Expressway No.153
- Pyeongtaek-Siheung Expressway 평택시흥고속도로

Route information
- Length: 42.6 km (26.5 mi)
- Existed: 2013–present

Major junctions
- South end: W Pyeongtaek JC in Pyeongtaek, Gyeonggi Province; Seohaean Expressway; Pyeongtaek–Yeongwol Expressway
- North end: Gunja JC in Siheung, Gyeonggi-do; Yeongdong Expressway

Location
- Country: South Korea

Highway system
- Highway systems of South Korea; Expressways; National; Local

- Pyeongtaek–Siheung Expressway
- Hangul: 평택시흥고속도로
- Hanja: 平澤始興高速道路
- RR: Pyeongtaek Siheung gosok doro
- MR: P'yŏngt'aek Sihŭng kosok toro

The Pyeongtaek–Siheung Expressway (Korean: 평택시흥고속도로), Also 2nd Seohaean Expressway, is an expressway in South Korea, connecting Pyeongtaek to Hwaseong, Ansan, and Siheung. It has Expressway Route No. 153 and is a Branch Line of Seohaean Expressway. The entire length from Pyeongtaek to Siheung is 42.6 km and the posted speed limit is 100 km/h.

== History ==
- 31 March 2008: Construction Begin
- 28 March 2013: Open to traffic.

== Compositions ==
=== Lanes ===
- W.Pyeongtaek JC ~ S.Ansan IC : 4
- S.Ansan IC ~ Gunja JC : 6

=== Length ===
39.4 km

=== Limited Speed ===
- W.Pyeongtaek JC ~ Gunja JC : 100 km/h

== List of facilities ==
- IC: Interchange, JC: Junction, SA: Service Area, TG:Tollgate

| No. | Name | Korean name | Hanja name | Connections | Distance | | Notes | Location | |
Connected directly with Pyeongtaek–Yeongwol Expressway
| | Pyeongtaek | 평택 시점 | 平澤 始點 | Pyeongtaek–Yeongwol Expressway | - | 0.0 | | Pyeongtaek | Gyeonggi |
| 1 | W.Pyeongtaek JC | 서평택분기점 | 西平澤分岐點 | Seohaean Expressway; Pyeongtaek–Yeongwol Expressway | 0.80 | 0.80 | | Pyeongtaek | Gyeonggi |
| 2 | Joam IC | 조암나들목 | 朝岩나들목 | National Route 77; National Route 82; Provincial Route 82; Provincial Route 310 | 4.06 | 10.98 | | Hwaseong | Gyeonggi |
| 2-1 | Mado JC | 조암나들목 | 朝岩나들목 | Seoul 2nd Belt Expressway | | | | Hwaseong | Gyeonggi |
| 3 | Songsan-Mado IC | 송산마도나들목 | 松山麻道나들목 | Provincial Route 322 | 11.32 | 22.30 | | Hwaseong | Gyeonggi |
| SA | Songsan Podo SA | 송산포도휴게소 | 松山葡萄休憩所 | | | | | Hwaseong | Gyeonggi |
| 4-1 | S. Ansan IC | 송산분기점 | 松山分岐點 | Seoul 2nd Belt Expressway | | | | Ansan | Gyeonggi |
| JC | Seonggok JC | 성곡분기점 | 城谷分岐點 | Seoul 2nd Belt Expressway | | | (November 2025) | Ansan | Gyeonggi |
| 4 | S.Ansan IC | 남안산나들목 | 南安山나들목 | National Route 39; National Route 77 | 13.82 | 36.12 | | Ansan | Gyeonggi |
| TG | W. Siheung TG | 서시흥요금소 | 西始興料金所 | | 2.66 | 38.78 | Mainline tollgate | Siheung | Gyeonggi |
| 5 | Gunja JC | 군자분기점 | 君子分岐點 | Yeongdong Expressway | 0.61 | 39.39 | Incheon-bound Only | Siheung | Gyeonggi |
Connected directly with Yeongdong Expressway
