= Pyeongtaek–Yeongwol Expressway =

Road in South Korea

Expressway No.40
- Pyeongtaek-Yeongwol Expressway

Route information
- Length: 127.5 km (79.2 mi)
- Existed: 2002–present

Major junctions
- West end: W.Pyeongtaek JC in Pyeongtaek, Gyeonggi-do; Seohaean Expressway; Pyeongtaek-Siheung Expressway
- 13
- East end: Jecheon JC in Jecheon, Chungcheongbuk-do; Jungang Expressway

Location
- Country: South Korea

Highway system
- Highway systems of South Korea; Expressways; National; Local

- Pyeongtaek–Yeongwol Expressway
- Hangul: 평택영월고속도로
- Hanja: 平澤寧越高速道路
- RR: Pyeongtaek Yeongwol gosok doro
- MR: P'yŏngt'aek Yŏngwŏl kosok toro

The Pyeongtaek–Yeongwol Expressway (Korean: 평택영월고속도로), Route 40, is an expressway in South Korea, currently connecting Pyeongtaek, Gyeonggi Province to Jecheon, North Chungcheong Province with planned extensions to Jecheon, Samcheok.

Originally assigned route number 24 during planning and initial construction, it was reassigned route number 40 in 2001 as part of the new South Korean expressway numbering scheme. Construction began in December 1997.

The Pyeongtaek–Jecheon Expressway is part of South Korea's integrated tollway system. Motorists pay tolls only when leaving the system, not when transferring between expressways within the system.

Though the expressway's official name became "Pyeongtaek-Chungju Expressway" (평택충주고속도로) in 2002 and "Pyeongtaek-Jecheon Expressway" in 2008,

== History ==
- 27 December 1997 : Construction Begin (W.Pyeongtaek JC – W.Anseong IC)
- 7 December 1997 : Construction Begin (W.Anseong IC – Daeso JC)
- 12 December 2002 : W.Pyeongtaek JC – W.Anseong IC segment opens to traffic.
- 8 August 2007 : Construction Begin (Daeso JC – E.Chungju IC)
- 11 November 2008 : S.Anseong IC – Daeso JC segment opens to traffic.
- July 2009 : Construction Begin (E.Chungju IC – Jecheon JC / S.Jecheon IC)
- 24 July 2009 : N.Jincheon IC opens to traffic.
- 12 August 2013 : Daeso IC – Chungju JC segment opens to traffic.
- 26 November 2013 : Geumwang-Kkotdongnae IC opens to traffic.
- 31 October 2014 : Chungju JC – E.Chungju IC segment opens to traffic.
- 30 June 2015 : E.Chungju IC – Jecheon JC / S.Jecheon IC segment opens to traffic.
- 30 June 2018 : Pyeongtaek-Godeok IC opens to traffic.
- 1 January 2025 : S. Anseong JC opens to traffic.

== Compositions ==
=== Lanes ===
- W.Anseong IC ~ Jecheon JC / S.Jecheon IC : 4
- W.Pyeongtaek JC ~ Songtan IC, Anseong JC~W.Anseong IC : 6
- Songtan IC ~ Anseong JC : 8

=== Length ===
- 127.5 km

=== Limited Speed ===
- high 100 km/h
- Low 50 km/h

== Line ==
- File is made by Netizen named 'Nokcha-Hyanggi(녹차향기)' from 'Road Club'

== Exits and Junctions ==
- IC: Interchange, JC: Junction, SA: Service Area, TG:Tollgate

No.	Name	Korean name	Hanja name	Connections	Notes	Location
Connected directly with Pyeongtaek-Siheung Expressway
1	W.Pyeongtaek JC	서평택분기점	西平澤分岐點	Seohaean Expressway; Pyeongtaek-Siheung Expressway		Pyeongtaek, Gyeonggi-do
2	Cheongbuk IC	청북나들목	靑北나들목	National Route 39		Pyeongtaek, Gyeonggi-do
2–1	Pyeongtaek JC	평택분기점	平澤高德	Pyeongtaek-Hwaseong Expressway		Pyeongtaek, Gyeonggi-do
SA	Pyeongtaek SA	평택휴게소	平澤休憩所			Pyeongtaek, Gyeonggi-do
2–2	Pyeongtaek Godeok	평택고덕	平澤分岐點	Cheomdan-daero; National Route 38		Pyeongtaek, Gyeonggi-do
3	Songtan IC	송탄나들목	松炭나들목	Provincial Route 302		Pyeongtaek, Gyeonggi-do
4	Anseong JC	안성분기점	安城分岐點	Gyeongbu Expressway( AH 1)		Anseong, Gyeonggi-do
5	W.Anseong IC	서안성나들목	西安城나들목	National Route 45		Anseong, Gyeonggi-do
6	S.Anseong IC	남안성나들목	南安城나들목	Provincial Route 23, Provincial Route 82		Anseong, Gyeonggi-do
SA	Anseongmatchum SA	안성맞춤휴게소	安城맞춤休憩所			Anseong, Gyeonggi-do
6-1	S.Anseong JC	남안성분기점	南安成分岐點	Provincial Route 29		Anseong, Gyeonggi-do
7	N.Jincheon IC	북진천나들목	北鎭川나들목	National Route 17		Jincheon, Chungcheongbuk-do
8	Daeso JC	대소분기점	大所分岐點	Jungbu Expressway		Eumseong, Chungcheongbuk-do
9	Geumwang-Kkotdongne IC	금왕꽃동네나들목	金旺꽃동네나들목	National Route 21		Eumseong, Chungcheongbuk-do
SA	Geumwang SA	금왕휴게소	金旺休憩所			Eumseong, Chungcheongbuk-do
10	Eumseong IC	음성나들목	陰城나들목	National Route 37, Provincial Route 82		Eumseong, Chungcheongbuk-do
11	W.Chungju IC	서충주나들목	西忠州나들목	National Route 3		Chungju, Chungcheongbuk-do
12	Chungju JC	충주분기점	忠州分岐點	Jungbu Naeryuk Expressway		Chungju, Chungcheongbuk-do
13	Noeun JC	노은분기점	老隱分岐點	Jungbu Naeryuk Expressway		Chungju, Chungcheongbuk-do
13	N.Chungju IC	북충주나들목	北忠州나들목	Provincial Route 82		Chungju, Chungcheongbuk-do
14	E.Chungju IC	동충주나들목	東忠州나들목	National Route 19; National Route 38		Chungju, Chungcheongbuk-do
SA	Cheondeungsan SA	천등산휴게소	天登山休憩所			Chungju, Chungcheongbuk-do
15	Jecheon JC	제천분기점	堤川分岐點	Jungang Expressway		Jecheon, Chungcheongbuk-do
15–1	S.Jecheon IC	남제천나들목	南堤川나들목	Provincial Route 82		Jecheon, Chungcheongbuk-do
Jecheon~Samcheok Section will start construction

== See also ==
- Roads and expressways in South Korea
- Transportation in South Korea
