= Bamseom =

Two islets in Seoul, South Korea

Coordinates: 37°32′N 126°55′E

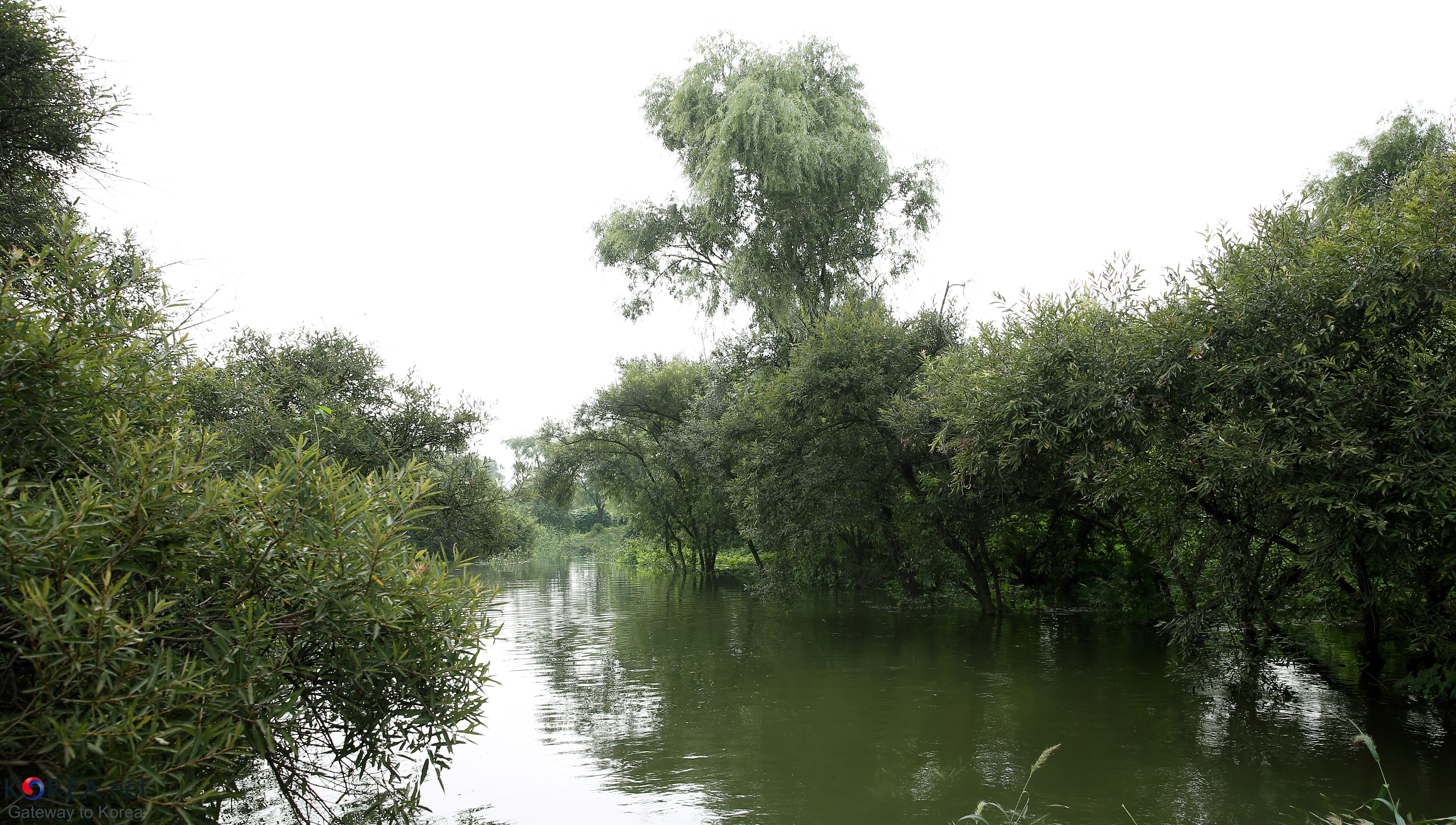
- Interactive map of Bamseom

Geography
- Location: Han River in Seoul, South Korea
- Area: 0.24 km^{2} (0.093 sq mi)

Korean name
- Hangul: 밤섬
- RR: Bamseom
- MR: Pamsŏm

Bamseom (Korean: 밤섬; lit. Chestnut Island) is a pair of islets in the Han River in Seoul, South Korea. The uninhabited islets, with a total area of about 0.24 km^{2} (0.093 sq mi) and length of 1,147 m (3,763 ft), are located between the larger island of Yeouido, to which they were once connected, and the north shore. They remain connected to one another by a narrow strip of sedimentary silt. Seogang Bridge passes directly over the western islet, though there is no access available, as the islets have been left as a natural sanctuary. There is, however, an observation point for bird-watching. Migratory birds use the islets often and among the birds which can be seen are mallards, great egrets, mandarins, common kestrels, and Eastern spot-billed ducks.

== History ==
The islands were inhabited until the Seogang Bridge was built over them, using the west islet as a support for one of the beams. Most of the inhabitants of Bamseom in the Joseon era were shipbuilders.

On February 10, 1968, Bamseom was detonated for the purpose of collecting rubble required for the construction of the embankment for the development of Yeouido, and the island was divided into upper Bamseom (northwest) and Lower Bamseom.

== Ecosystem ==
Bamseom is a key location for a wide variety of bird species, such as the Mandarin duck, and it serves as a shelter for migratory birds during the winter. There are also about 108 species of plants on the island, such as willow trees and itch reeds. Additionally, Bamseom is an excellent place for children living in the city to experience nature. In 1999, the Seoul metropolitan government registered Bamseon as a "natural preservation district".

Banseom was designated Ramsar site 2050 on 21-06-2012. Banseom's waters are a spawning and nursery ground for many Korean indigenous fish, including Acheilognathus yamatsutae, Acanthorhodeus gracilis, and Sarcocheilichthys nigripinnus morii. It is also a wintering habitat for many waterfowl, and in summer it is a breeding ground for species such as Spot-billed Ducks (Anas poecilorhyncha) and Black-crowned Night Herons (Nycticorax nycticorax).

== West Islet ==
The west islet, over which Seogang Bridge passes, has a length of 560 metres (1,840 ft). This is the more forested of the two islets, particularly at the western point.

== East Islet ==
The east islet has a length of 655 metres (2,149 ft). This islet contains a bay which opens onto the strip of water between the islets. This bay has largely silted up and is therefore marshy and contains many reeds and reed-dwelling organisms.

=== Gallery ===
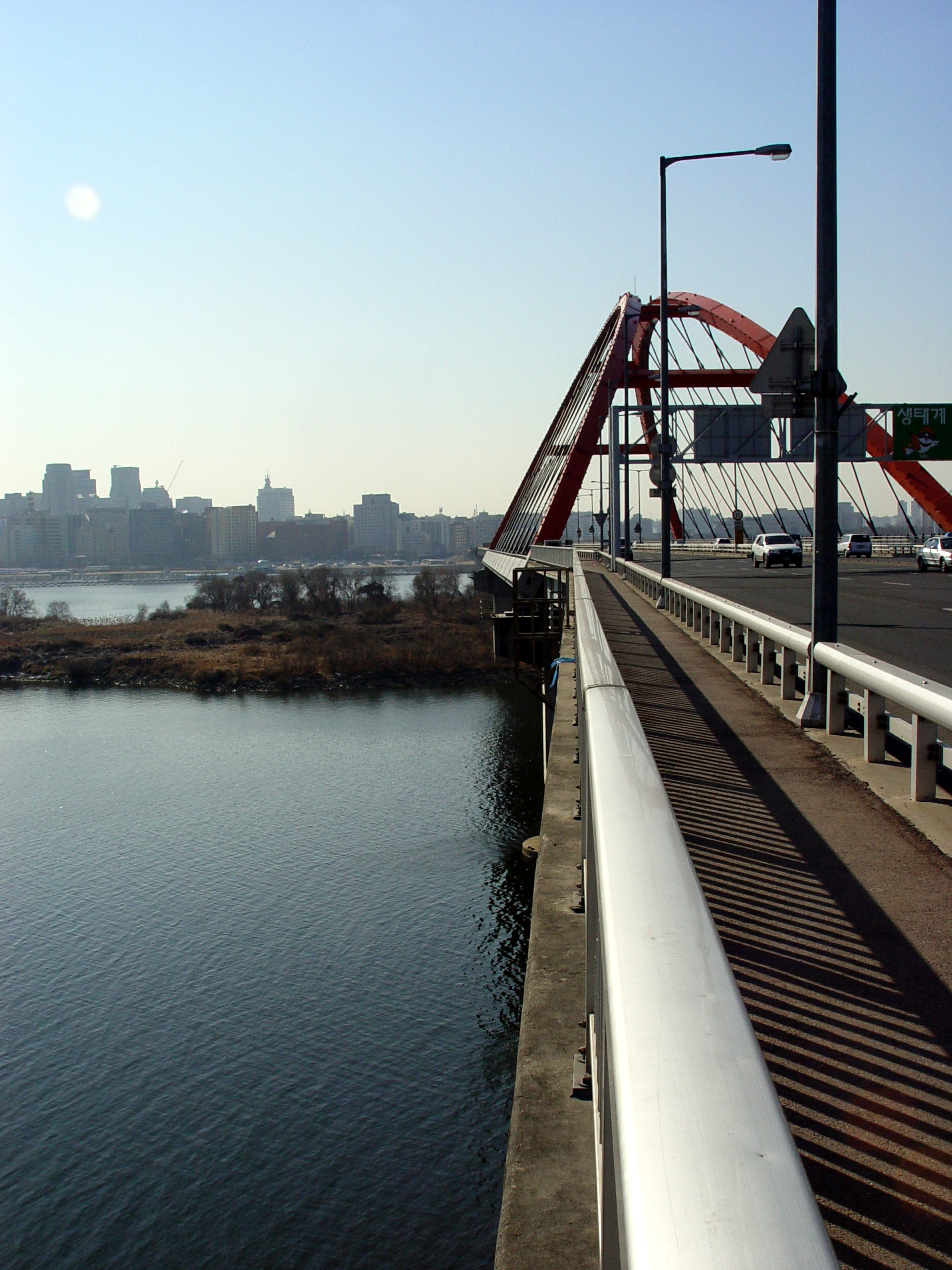
Seogang Bridge and the western islet of Bamseom

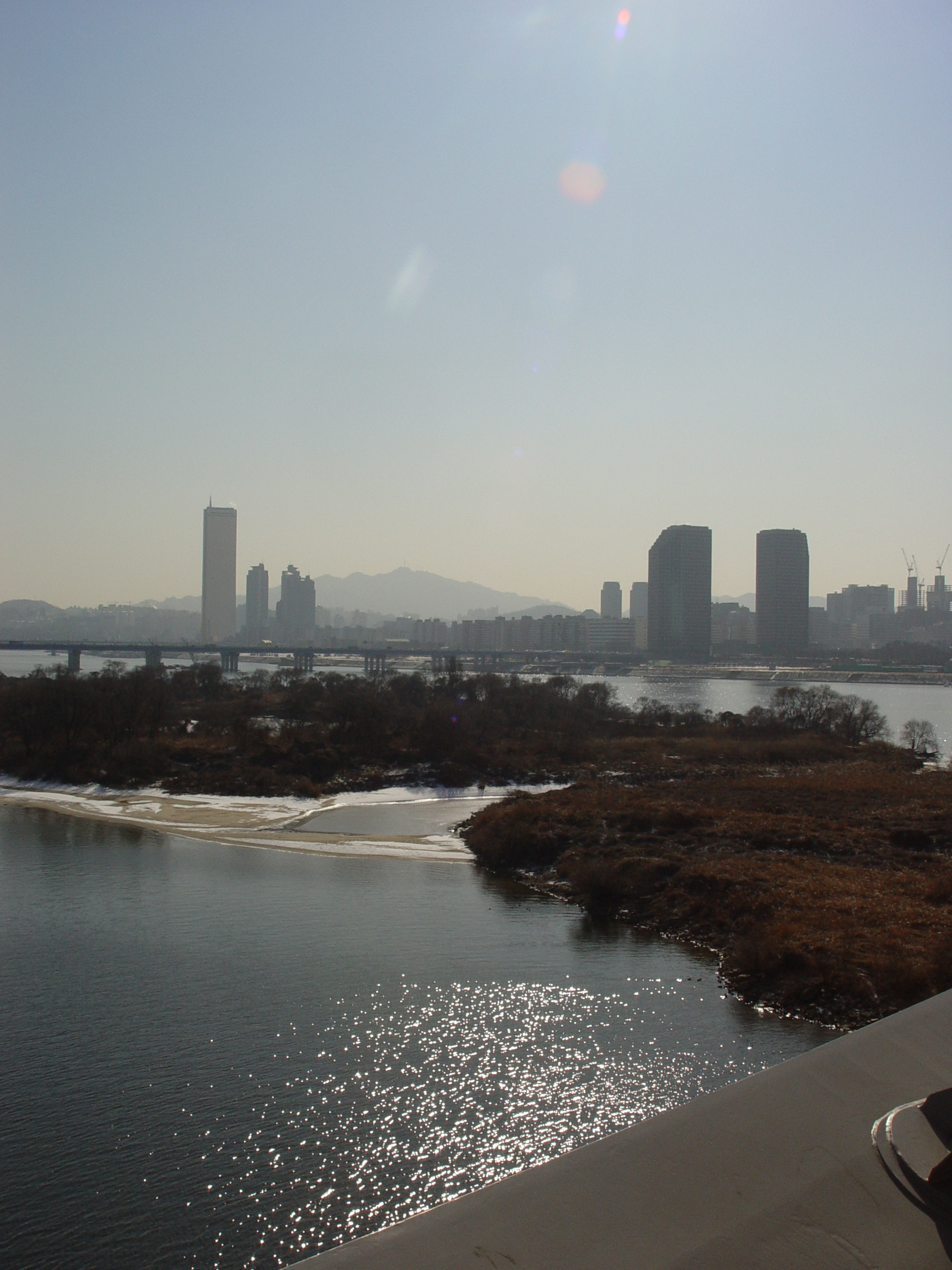
Bamseom with Yeouido in the background

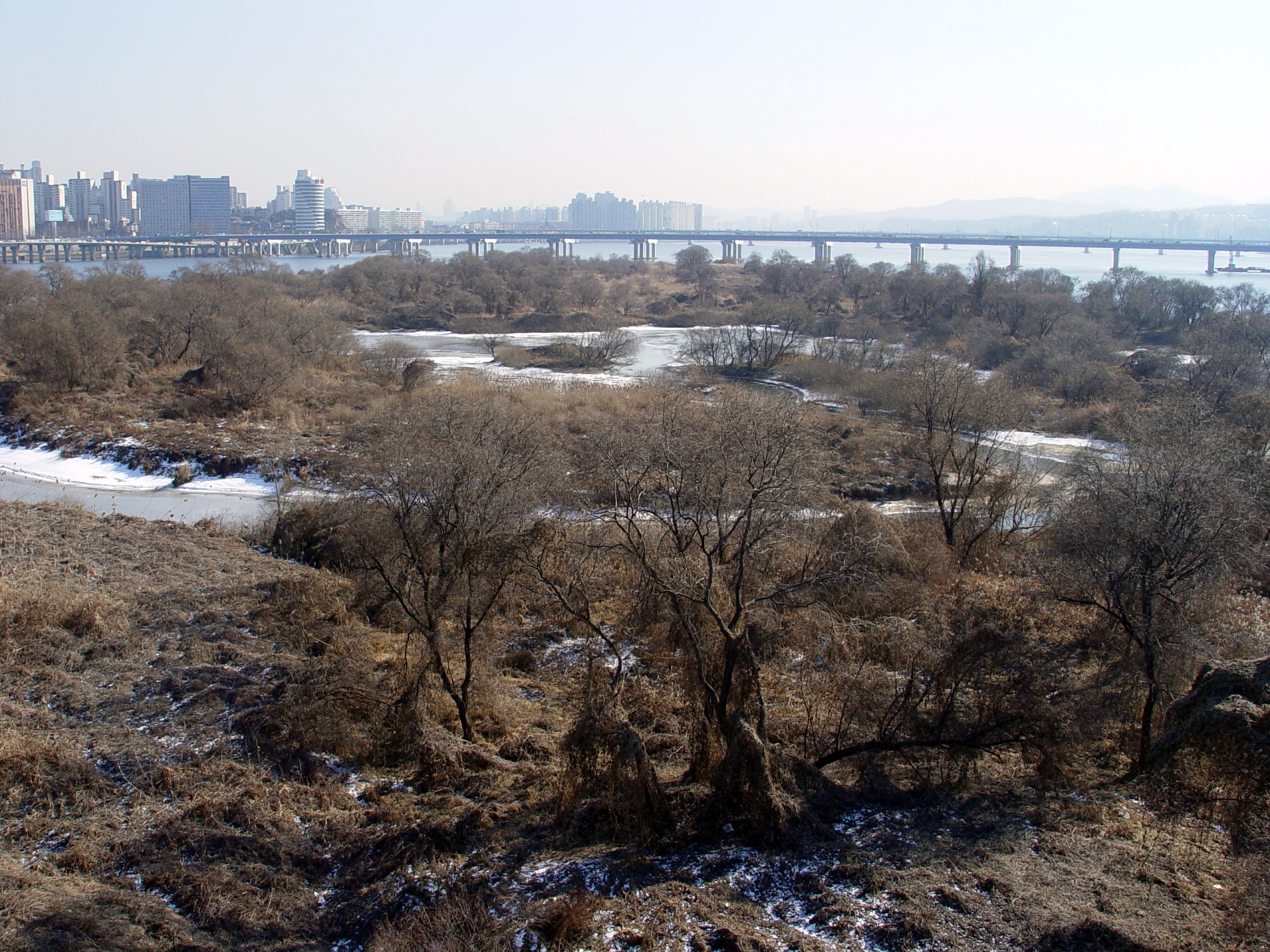
Bamseom's East Islet from Seogang Bridge

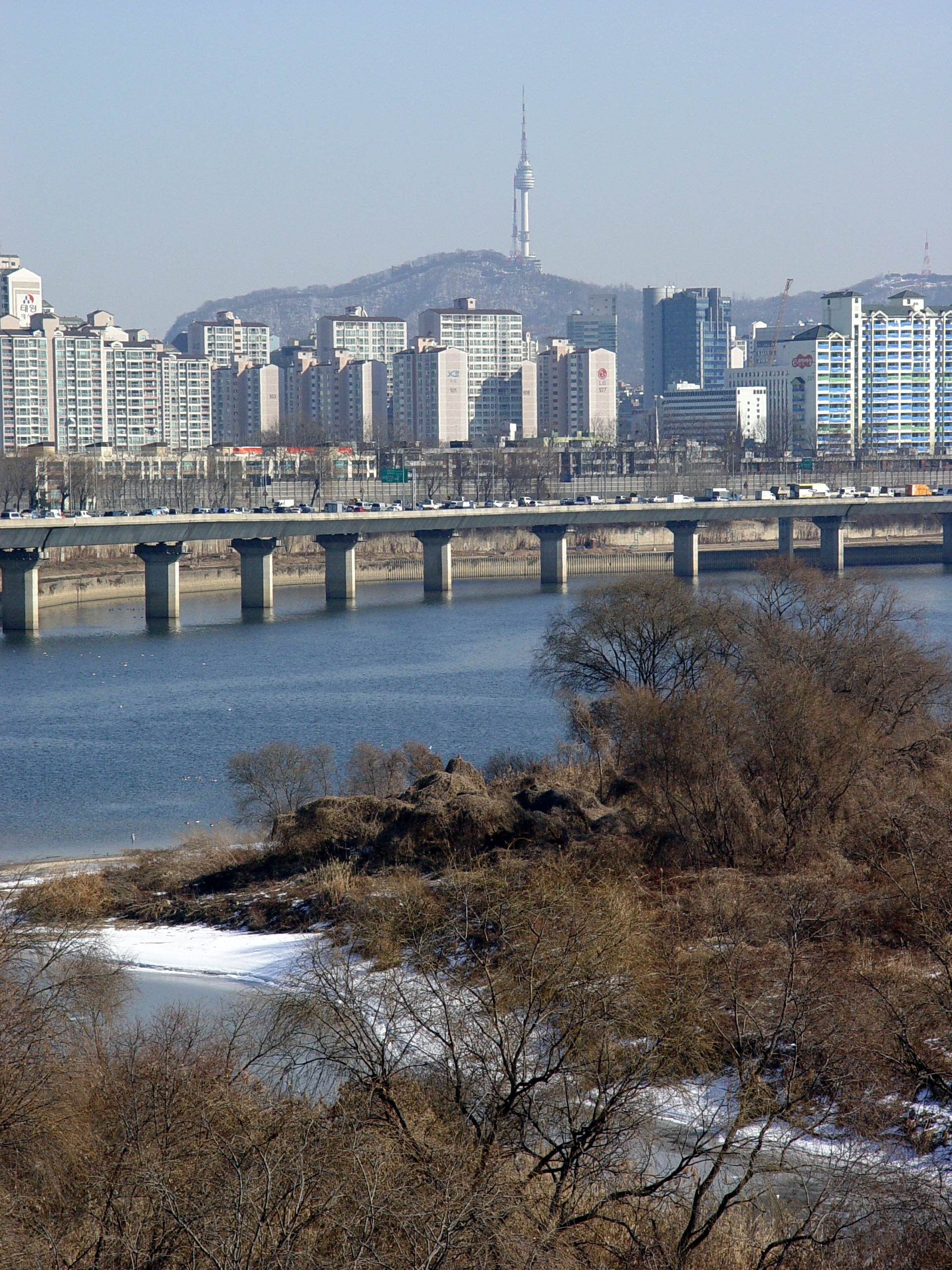
Bamseom and Namsan

== Park ==
Bamseon has extensive facilities for tourists and visitors. So far, 6 observatory platforms and direction boards for visitors have been erected. The facility allows citizens to visit from December to February. This timetable was set by a 1999 governmental decision, as this is a Ramsar site and protecting the birds is critical when choosing a time for observation of the birds by ornithologists and naturalists.

== Films ==
Bamseon is the primary location in the 2009 Korean film Castaway on the Moon in which a man (Jung Jae-young) decides to commit suicide by jumping into the Han river, only to find himself washed ashore and stranded on the island.

== See also ==
- Desert island
- List of islands
