= Second Gyeongin Expressway =

Road in South Korea

Expressway No.110
- Second Gyeongin Expressway

Route information
- Length: 67.8 km (42.1 mi)
- Existed: 1994–present

Major junctions
- West end: Gonghang Newtown IC in Jung-gu, Incheon; Incheon International Airport Expressway
- 15
- East end: Seoksu IC in Anyang, Gyeonggi-do; National Route 1

Location
- Country: South Korea

Highway system
- Highway systems of South Korea; Expressways; National; Local

- Second Gyeongin Expressway
- Hangul: 제2경인고속도로
- Hanja: 第二京仁高速道路
- RR: Je2 Gyeongin gosok doro
- MR: Che2 Kyŏngin kosok toro

The Second Gyeongin Expressway (Korean: 제2경인고속도로) is an expressway in South Korea, connecting Incheon to Seongnam. It is numbered 110 and has a length of 67.8 km. In Incheon International Airport to Hakik JC, It connected by Incheon Grand Bridge(인천대교).

== History ==
- 19 December 1990: Construction begins.
- 6 July 1994: Neunghae IC~Gwangmyeong IC segment opens to traffic.
- 18 December 1995: Gwangmyeong IC~Seoksu IC segment opens to traffic.
- 28 December 1998: Seoksu IC~Sammak IC segment opens to traffic.
- 16 October 2009: Incheon Grand Bridge opens to traffic.
- May 2012: Seoksu IC~Seongnam JC construction begins.
- May 2017: Seoksu IC~Seongnam JC segment opens to traffic.

== Fire ==
On 29 December 2022, a major fire broke out on the near Gwacheon, leaving five dead and 37 others injured.

== Compositions ==
=== Lanes ===
- Ongnyeon IC~Hagik JC: 2
- Yeonsu JC~Ongnyeon IC, Seoksu IC~Sammak IC : 4
- Gonghang Newtown JC ~ Yeongjong IC, Incheon Bridge TG ~ Yeonsu JC, Neunghae IC ~ Namdong IC, Seochang JC ~ Seoksu IC : 6
- Namdong IC ~ Seochang JC : 9 (Incheon 5, Anyang 4)
- Yeongjong IC ~ Incheon Bridge TG : 10

=== Length ===
- Total: 67.8 km
- Incheon Bridge: 19.96 km
- Neunghae~Yeosudaero: 48.6 km
- Yeonsu~Songdo: 1.03 km

=== Limited Speed ===
- Maximum speed: 100 km/h
- Minimum speed: 50 km/h

== Gallery ==
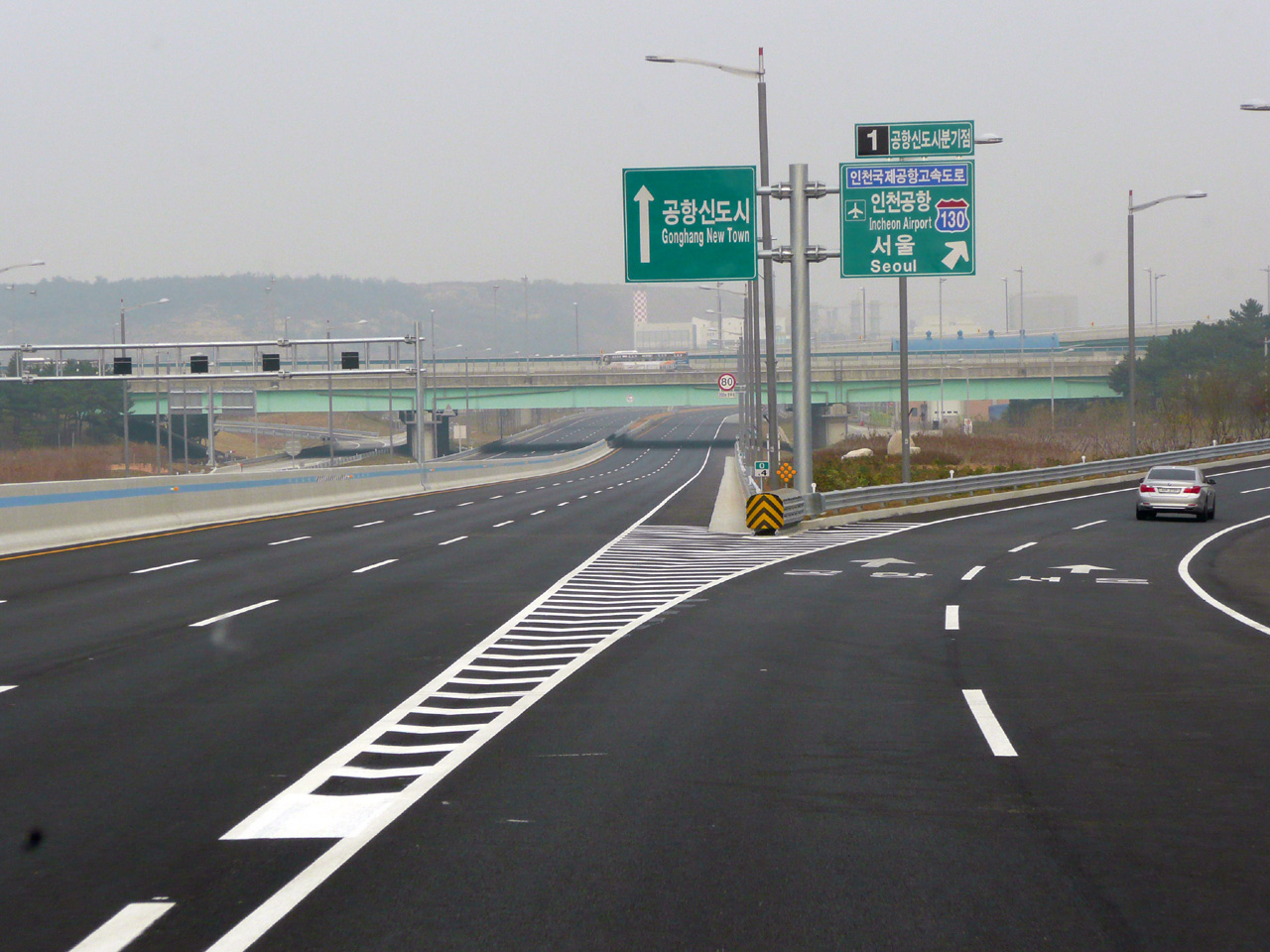
Airport Town Square JC

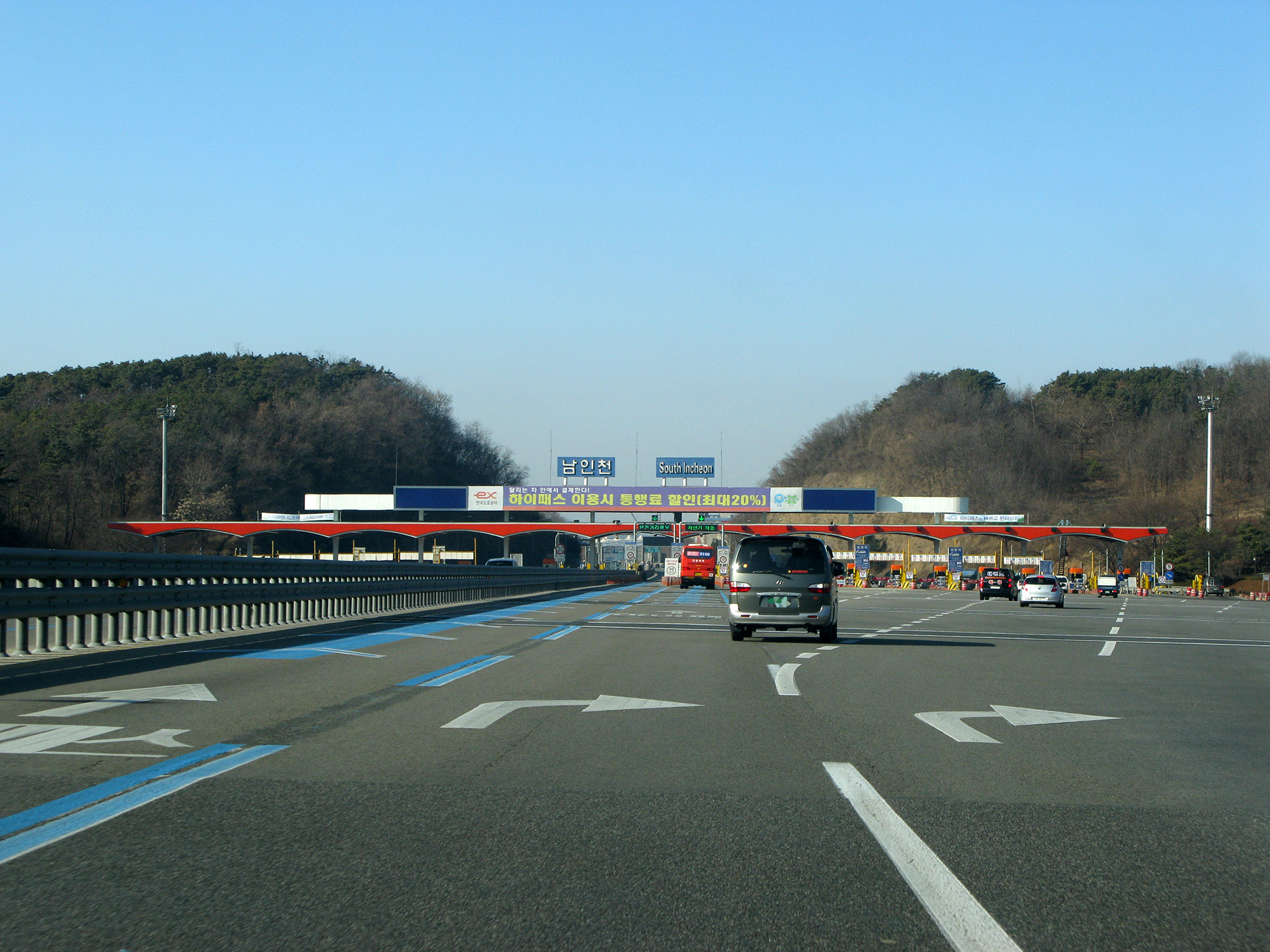
South Incheon TG

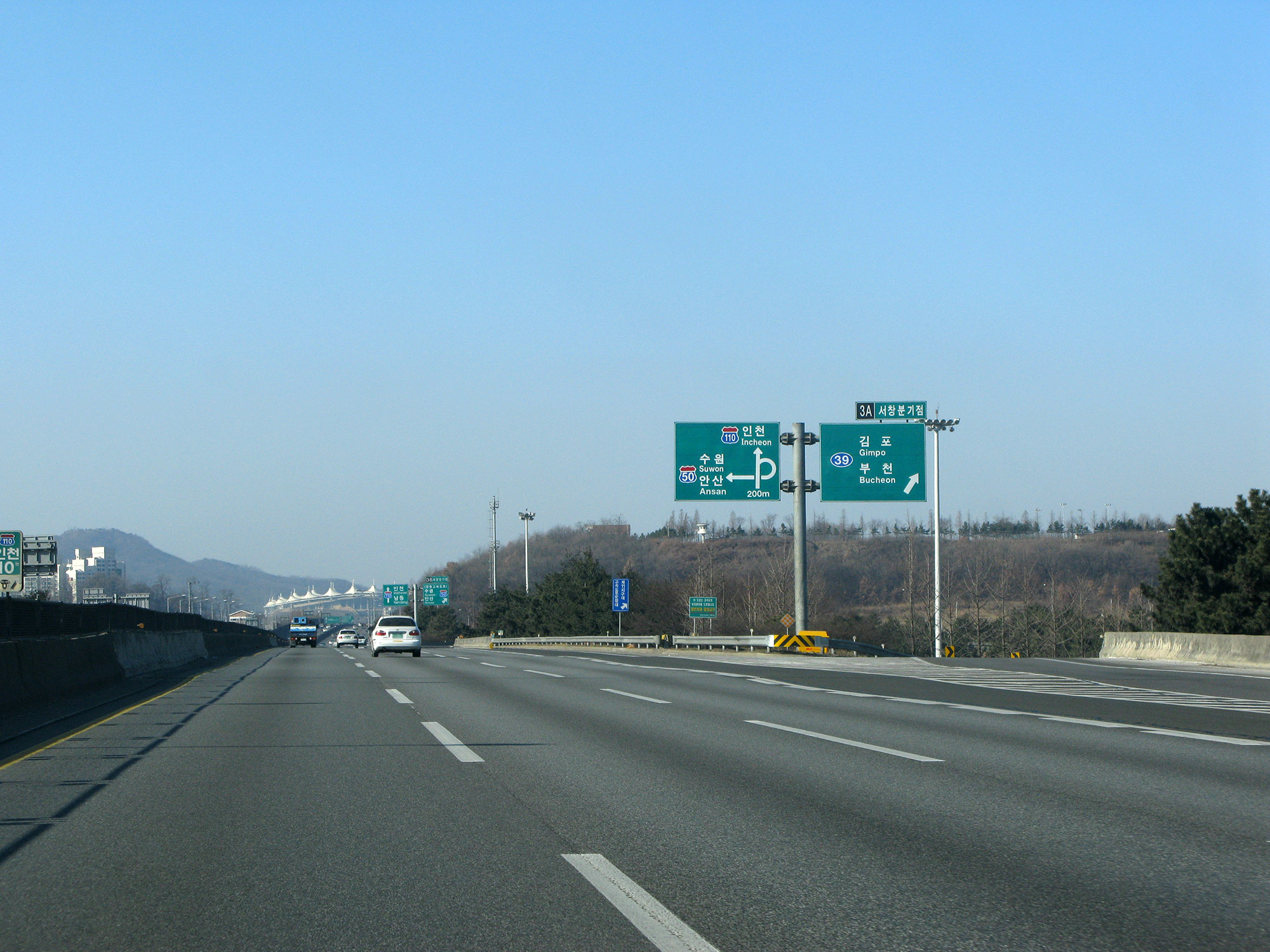
Seochang JC (Junction to Yeongdong Expressway)

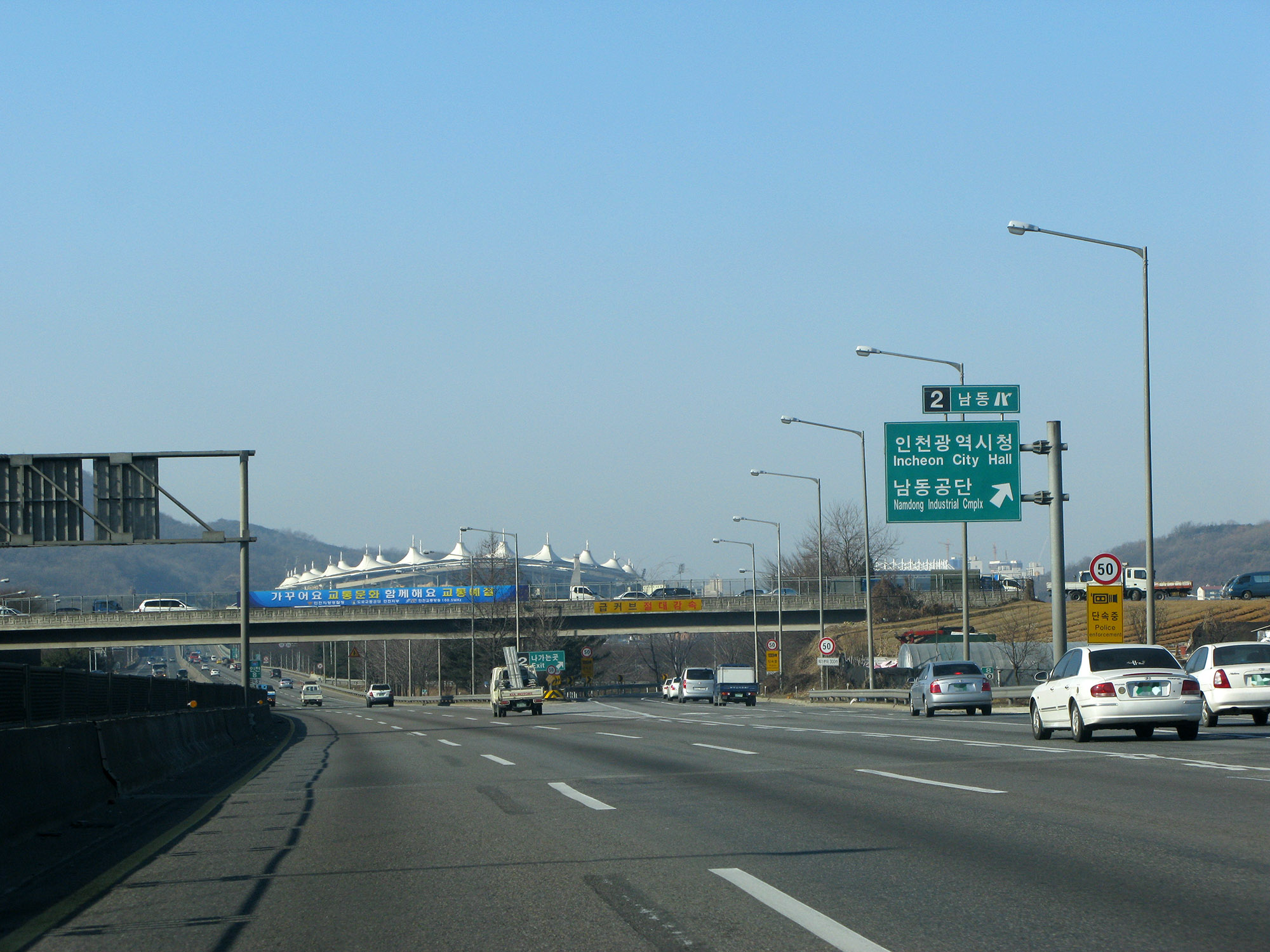
Namdong IC

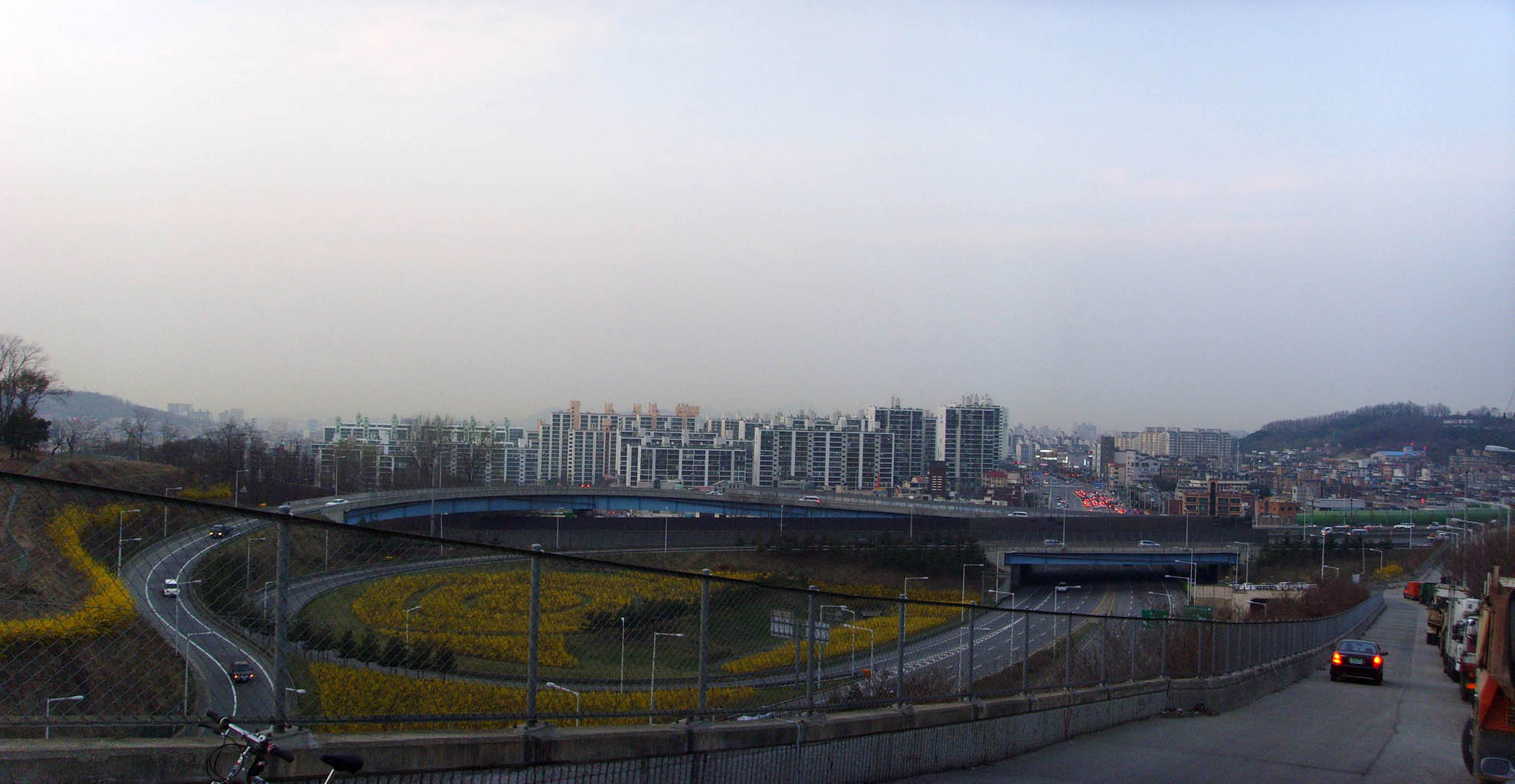
Munhak IC

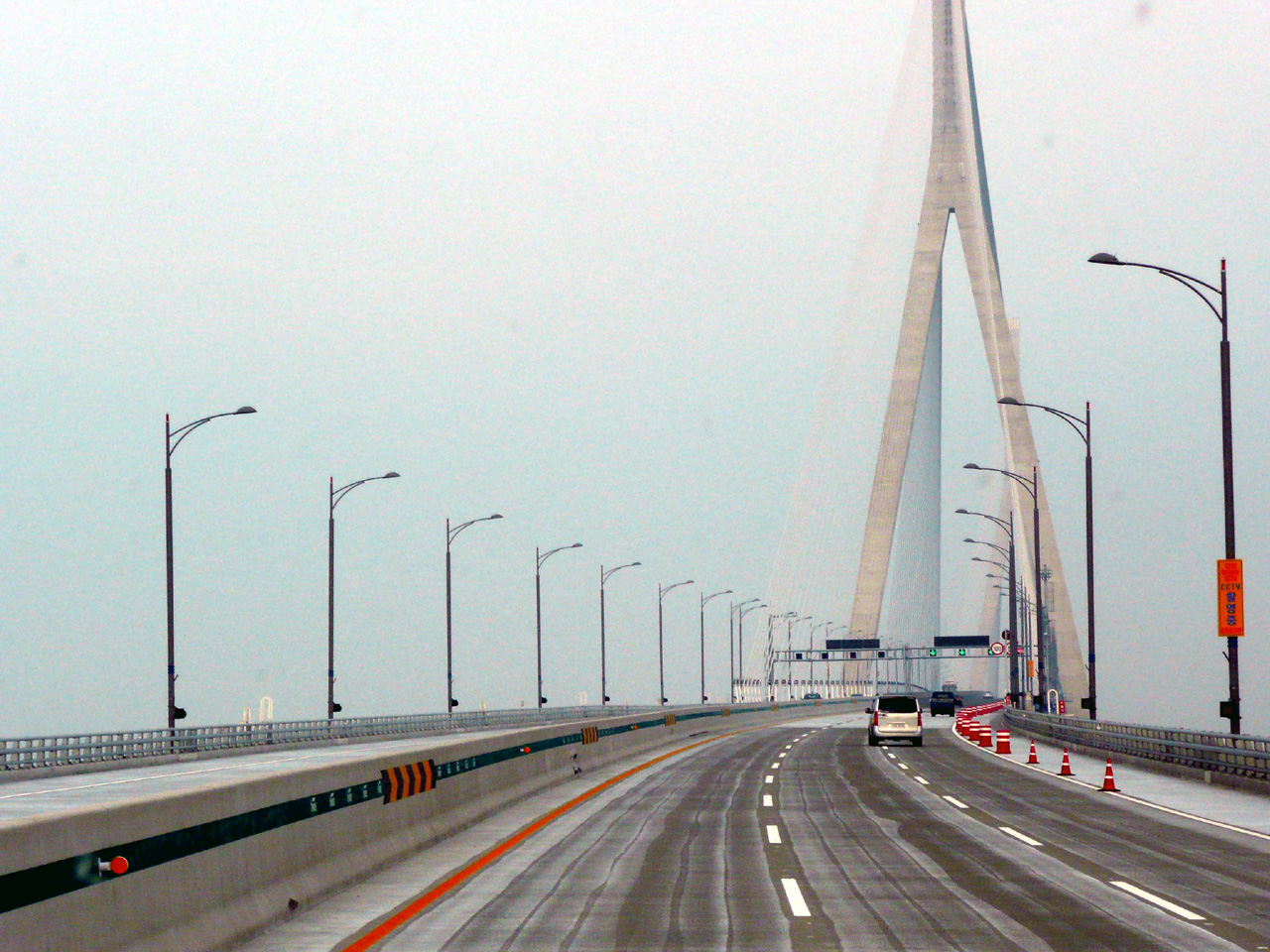
Incheon Grand Bridge

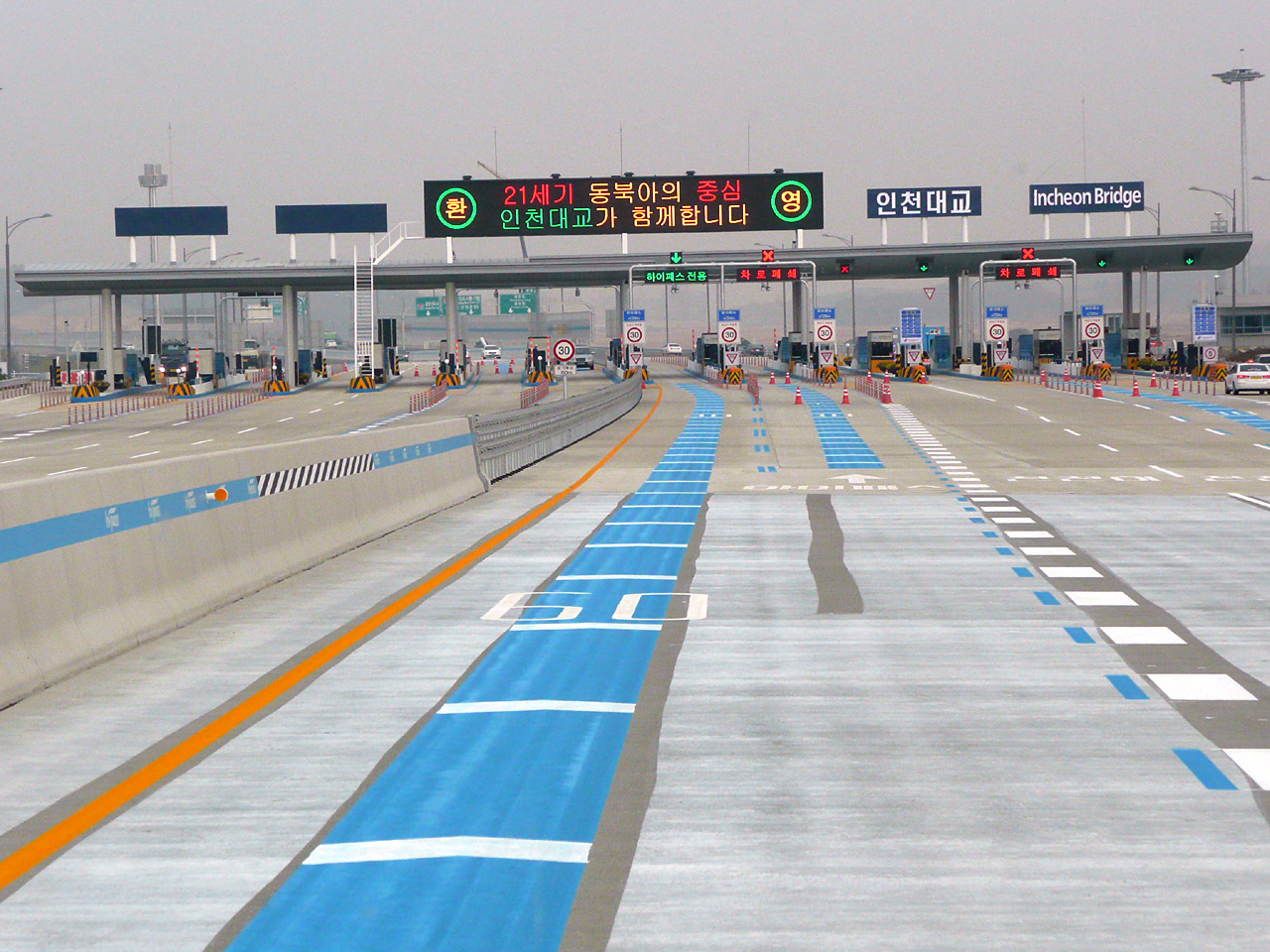
Incheon Bridge TG

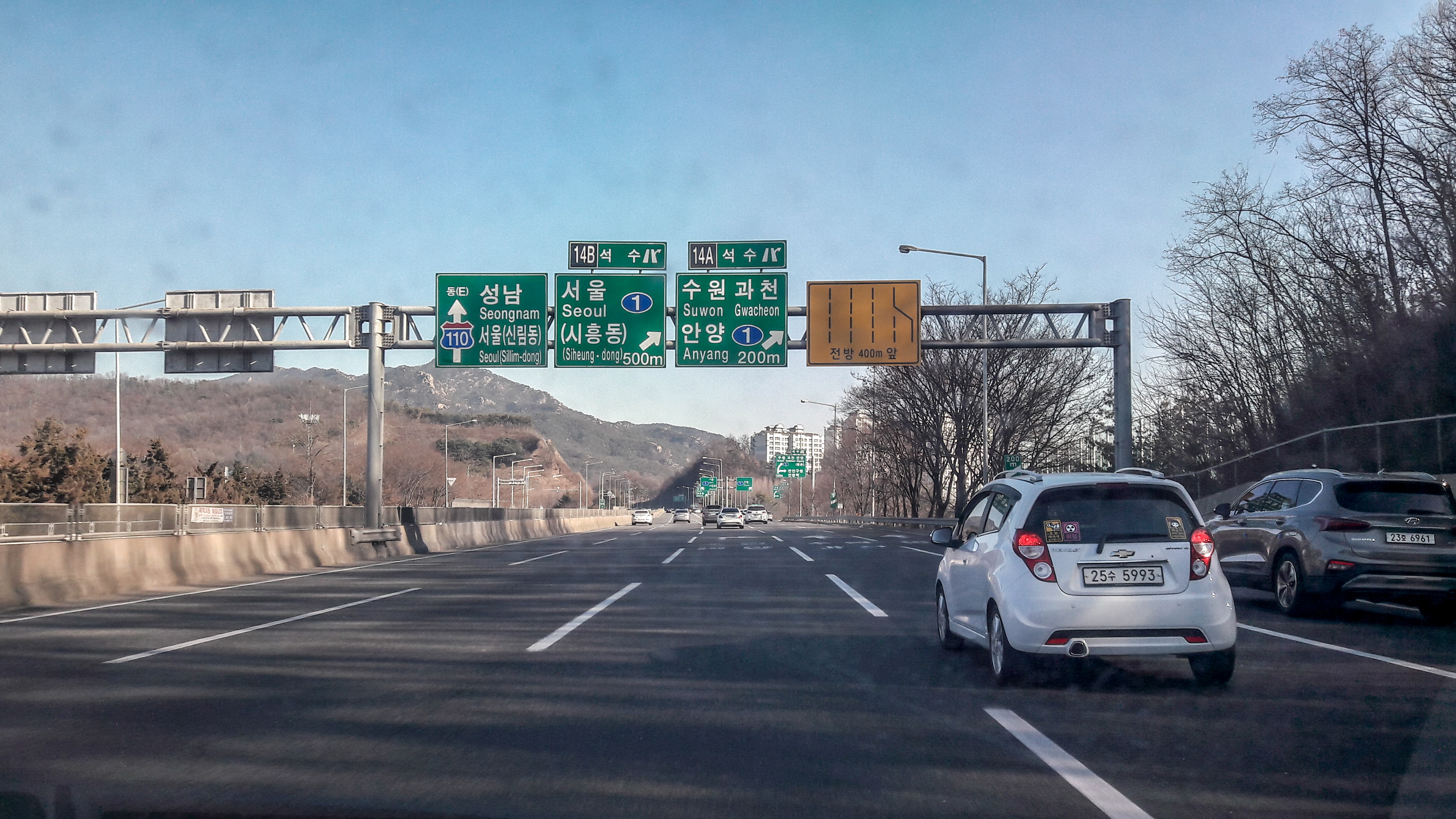
Seoksu IC

== List of facilities ==
- IC: Interchange, JC: Junction, SA: Service Area, TG: Tollgate
  - Light blue (■): Privately operated sections (Incheon Bridge Co., Ltd., J. Gyeongin Connecting Expressway Co., Ltd.)

=== Main section ===
| No. | Name | Korean name | Hanja name | Connections | Notes | Location |
Directly connected to Yeongjonghaeanbuk-ro 1050-gil
| 1 | Airport New Town JC | 공항신도시분기점 | 空港新都市分岐點 | Incheon Int'l Airport Expressway; Yeongjonghaeanbuk-ro 1050-gil | | Yeongjung-gu, Incheon |
| 2 | Yeongjong IC | 영종나들목 | 永宗나들목 | Yeongjonghaeannam-ro | | Yeongjung-gu, Incheon |
| TG | Incheon Bridge TG | 인천대교요금소 | 仁川大橋料金所 | | Main tollgate | Yeongjung-gu, Incheon |
| BR | Incheon Bridge | 인천대교 | 仁川大橋 | | L=21.38 km | Yeongjung-gu, Incheon |
| 4 | Yeonsu JC | 연수분기점 | 延壽分岐點 | Yeonsu - Songdo section | | Yeonsu-gu, Incheon |
| 5 | Ongnyeon IC | 옥련나들목 | 玉蓮나들목 | National Route 77 | | Yeonsu-gu, Incheon |
| 6 | Hagik JC | 학익분기점 | 鶴翼分岐點 | Neunghae - Hagik section | | Michuhol-gu, Incheon |
| 7 | Munhak IC | 문학나들목 | 文鶴나들목 | Michuhol-daero (Incheon city expressway) | | Michuhol-gu, Incheon |
| 8 | Namdong IC | 남동나들목 | 南洞나들목 | Namdong-daero; Biryu-daero | | Namdong-gu, Incheon |
| 9 | Seochang JC | 서창분기점 | 西昌分岐點 | Yeongdong Expressway; Seoul Ring Expressway; National Route 39; National Route 42 | | Namdong-gu, Incheon |
| TG | S. Incheon TG | 남인천요금소 | 南仁川料金所 | | Main Tollgate | Namdong-gu, Incheon |
| 10 | Sincheon IC | 신천나들목 | 新川나들목 | | | Siheung, Gyeonggi-do |
| 11 | Anhyeon JC | 안현분기점 | 鞍峴分岐點 | Seoul Ring Expressway | | Siheung, Gyeonggi-do |
| 12 | Gwangmyeong IC | 광명나들목 | 光明나들목 | Local Route 397 | | Gwangmyeong, Gyeonggi-do |
| 13 | Iljik JC | 일직분기점 | 日直分岐點 | Seohaean Expressway | | Gwangmyeong, Gyeonggi-do |
| 14 | Seoksu IC | 석수나들목 | 石水나들목 | National Route 1 | | Anyang, Gyeonggi-do |
| 15 | Sammak IC | 삼막나들목 | 三幕나들목 | Hoam-ro | | Anyang, Gyeonggi-do |
| TG | Anyang-Gwacheon TG | 안양과천 요금소 | | | Incheon-bound Only | Gwacheon, Gyeonggi-do |
| 16 | N. Uiwang IC | 북의왕 나들목 | | Poil-Munwon Connecting Road | | Uiwang, Gyeonggi-do |
| 17 | N. Cheonggye IC | 북청계 나들목 | | Local Route 57 (Anyangpangyo-ro) | | Uiwang, Gyeonggi-do |
| TG | N. Pangyo TG | 북판교 요금소 | | | Seongnam-bound Only | Seongnam, Gyeonggi-do |
| 19 | E. Pangyo IC | 동판교 나들목 | | Bundang-Naegok Urban Expressway | | Seongnam, Gyeonggi-do |
| 20 | Yeosudaero IC | 여수대로 나들목 | | National Route 3 (Seongnamicheon-ro · Seongnam-daero); Yeosu-daero | | Seongnam, Gyeonggi-do |
Directly connected to Seongnam-Icheon-ro

=== Yeonsu - Songdo section ===
| No. | Name | Korean name | Hanja name | Connections | Notes | Location |
Directly connected to the main line section
| 4 | Yeonsu JC | 연수분기점 | 延壽分岐點 | Main section | | Songdo-dong, Yeonsu-gu, Incheon |
| | Songdo IC | 송도 나들목 | 松島交叉路 | National Route 77 (Aam-daero); 3rd Gyeongin Highway | | Songdo-dong, Yeonsu-gu, Incheon |
Directly connected to Aam-daero

=== Neunghae - Hagik section ===
| No. | Name | Korean name | Hanja name | Connections | Notes | Location |
Directly connected to Chukhang-daero
| | Neunghae IC | 능해 | 能解 | Aam-daero; Chukhang-daero | Former main line origin before 2009 | Michuhol-gu, Incheon |
| 6 | Hagik JC | 학익 분기점 | 鶴翼分岐點 | Main section | | Michuhol-gu, Incheon |
Directly connected to the main line section

== See also ==
- Roads and expressways in South Korea
- Transportation in South Korea
