= Geumcheon Interchange =

Expressway interchange

Geumcheon Interchange 금천 나들목

Location
- Doksan1-dong, Geumcheon-gu, Seoul, South Korea
- Coordinates: 37°27′33.93″N 126°53′28.65″E
- Roads at junction: Seohaean Expressway; National Route 1 (Seobu Urban Expressway)

Construction
- Type: Trumpet interchange
- Constructed: 1991-94
- Opened: November 25, 1998
- Maintained by: Korea Expressway Corporation; City of Seoul

The Geumcheon Interchange (금천 나들목) is an interchange of the Seohaean Expressway and Seobu Urban Expressway in Doksan-dong, Geumcheon-gu, Seoul, Republic of Korea.

Seohaean Expressway's Ending Point (West Seoul) is in up north 400 meters of this Interchange.

== Roads ==
Seohaean Expressway
| toward Mokpo | ← | 38; Geumcheon IC | → | toward Seoul |
| 37; Soha Junction | ← | 38; Geumcheon IC | → | Ending Point |
Seobu Urban Expressway
| toward Anyang | ← | Geumcheon IC | → | toward Seongsan |
| To Anyang | ← | Geumcheon IC | → | Geumcheon Br. IC |

== History ==
- July 9, 1996: The 4.42 km section of road from Gasan-dong, Geumcheon-gu, Seoul to Seoksu-dong, Manan-gu, Anyang-si, Gyeonggi-do was decided due to construction of a new interchange.
- November 25, 1998: Open to traffic.

== Around ==
- Doksan Station
- Anyangcheon
