= Gangnam Beltway =

Urban expressway in South Korea

Seoul Metropolitan City Route 94 Gangnam Beltway
- 서울특별시도 제94호선 강남순환로

Route information
- Length: 13.82 km (8.59 mi)
- Existed: July 3rd 2016–present

Major junctions
- West end: Geumcheon District, Seoul
- East end: Seocho District, Seoul

Location
- Country: South Korea

Highway system
- Highway systems of South Korea; Expressways; National; Local

Gangnam Beltway (Korean: 강남순환로) is an urban expressway located in Seoul, South Korea. With a total length of 13.82 km (8.59 mi), this expressway starts from the Soha Interchange in Geumcheon District, Seoul to Seonam Interchange in Seocho District.

== Stopovers ==
Seoul

- Geumcheon District - Gwanak District - Seocho District

== List of Facilities ==
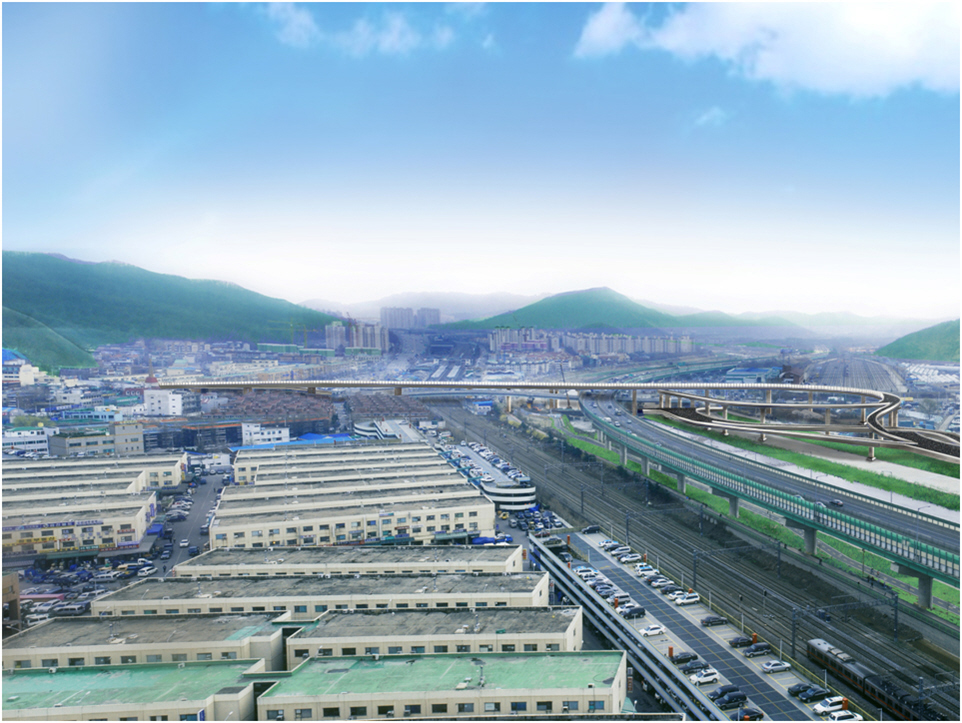
Architectural rendering of Siheung-daero crossing.

IC : Interchange (나들목)
JC : Junction (분기점)
TG : Tollgate (요금소)
TN : Tunnel (터널)

- (■): Motorway section

| Type | Name | Hangul name | Connection | Location | | Note |
Directly connected with Pyeongtaek-Paju Expressway
| IC JC | Soha IC Soha JC | 소하 나들목 소하 분기점 | Pyeongtaek-Paju Expressway; Seohaean Expressway; National Route 1 (Anyangcheon-ro, Geumha-ro) | Seoul | Geumcheon District | |
| BR | Hoam Bridge | 호암대교 | | Seoul | Geumcheon District | |
| IC | Geumcheon Ramp | 금천 램프 | National Route 1 (Siheung-daero) | Seoul | Geumcheon District | Soha-bound Only |
| TG | Geumcheon TG | 금천 요금소 | | Seoul | Geumcheon District | Main-line Tollgate |
| TN | Gwanak Tunnel | 관악터널 | | Seoul | Geumcheon District | L= 4,834m |
| TN | Gwanak Tunnel | 관악터널 | | Seoul | Gwanak District | L= 4,834m |
| IC | Gwanak IC | 관악 나들목 | Sillim-ro | Seoul | Gwanak District | |
| TN | Bongcheon Tunnel | 봉천터널 | Sillim-Bongcheon Tunnel (Under construction) | Seoul | Gwanak District | L= 3,221m |
| IC | Sadang IC | 사당 나들목 | Gwacheon-daero | Seoul | Gwanak District | |
| IC | Sadang IC | 사당 나들목 | Gwacheon-daero | Seoul | Seocho District | |
| TN | Seocho Tunnel | 서초터널 | | Seoul | Seocho District | L= 2,620m |
| TG | Seonam TG | 선암 요금소 | | Seoul | Seocho District | Main-line Tollgate |
| IC | Seonam IC | 선암 나들목 | National Route 47 (Yangjae-daero) | Seoul | Seocho District | |
Directly connected with National Route 47 (Yangjae-daero)

== See also ==
- Roads and expressways in South Korea
- Transportation in South Korea
