= Seohae Bridge =

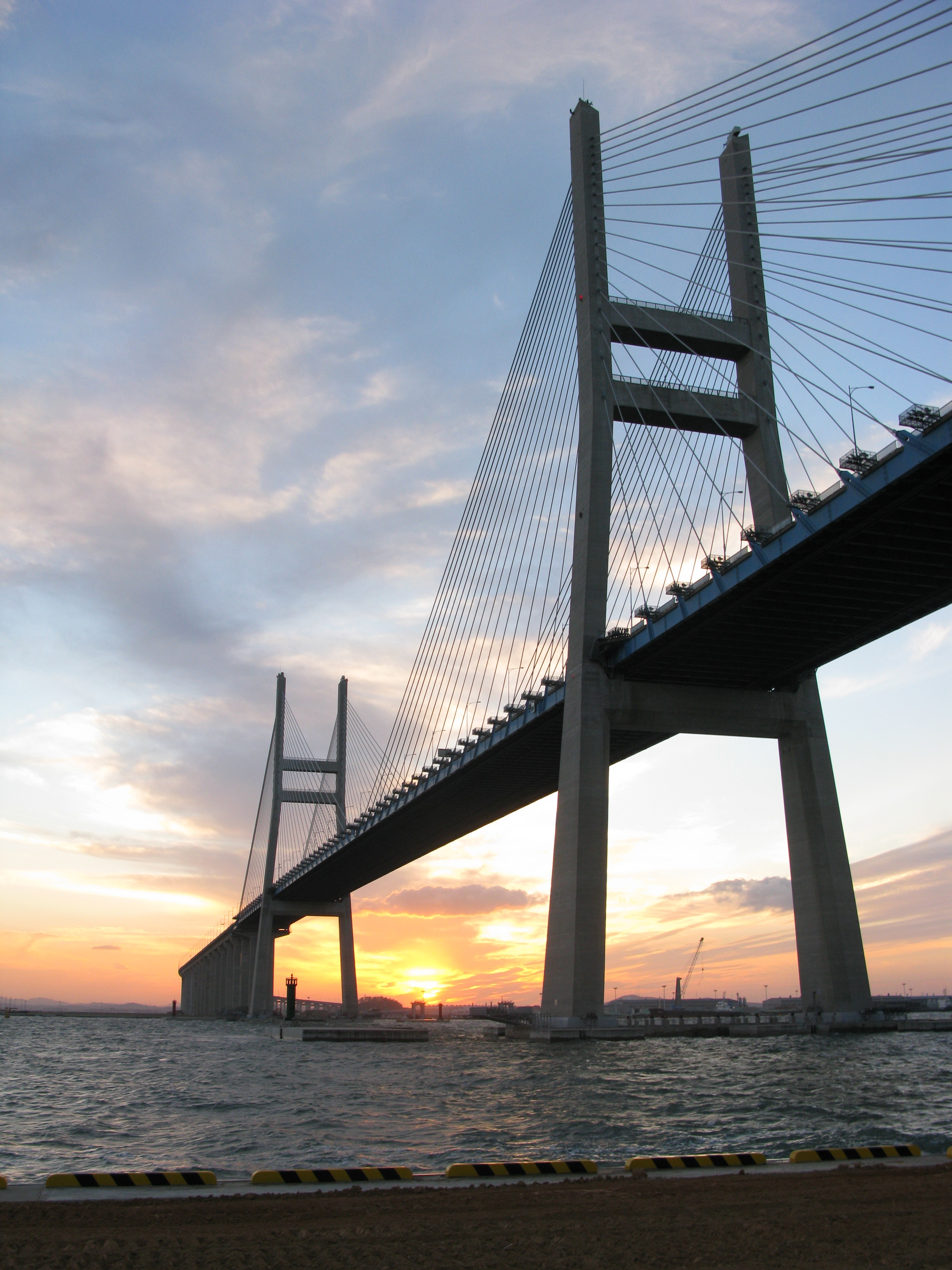
- Coordinates: 36°56′39.9″N 126°49′23.8″E
- Carries: 6 lanes motorway
- Crosses: Asan Bay
- Locale: Gyeonggi and Chungcheongnam, South Korea
- Official name: Seohae Grand Bridge

Characteristics
- Design: cable-stayed bridge
- Total length: 7,310 metres (23,980 ft)
- Width: 34 metres (112 ft)
- Longest span: 470 metres (1,540 ft)

History
- Designer: SAMWOO
- Construction start: 1993
- Construction end: 2000
- Opened: November 9, 2000

Location
- Interactive map of Seohae Bridge

The Seohae Bridge (Korean: 서해대교) is a cable-stayed bridge that connects Pyeongtaek and Dangjin, South Korea. Bridge construction started in 1993 and was completed in 2000 at a cost of 677.7 billion won. A prop (and some precast segments) fell on August 5, 1999 under construction due to Typhoon Olga. The bridge opened on November 9, 2000.

== See also ==
- Transportation in South Korea
- List of bridges in South Korea
- List of longest cable-stayed bridge spans
