= Seogang Bridge =

Bridge in Seoul, South Korea

- Hangul: 서강대교
- Hanja: 西江大橋
- RR: Seogang daegyo
- MR: Sŏgang taegyo

Soegang Bridge
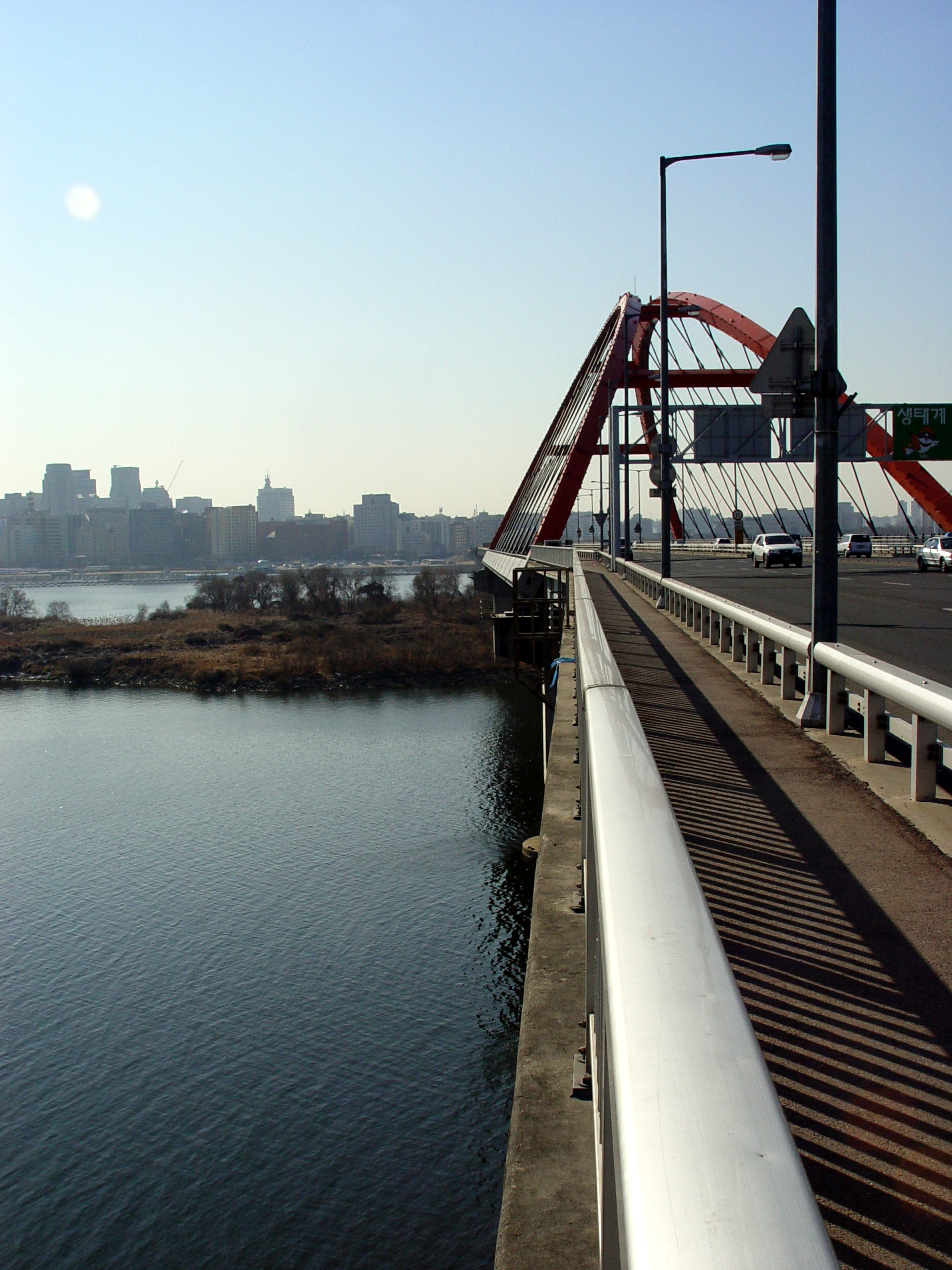
- Soegang Bridge
- Coordinates: 37°32′18.5″N 126°55′33.5″E
- Carries: vehicles
- Crosses: Han River between Seoul Yeongdeungpo District and Mapo District
- Locale: Seoul Yeongdeungpo District to Mapo District
- Official name: 서강대교 (西江大橋)
- Other name: Seogang Daegyo

Characteristics
- Design: steel plate girder bridge, Nielsen type arch bridge
- Total length: 1,320m
- Width: 29m
- Height: 21m
- Longest span: 150m
- No. of lanes: 6

History
- Construction start: 7 June 1980
- Opened: 1996; 30 years ago

Location
- Interactive map of Soegang Bridge

Seogang Bridge or Grand Seogang Bridge (Korean: 서강대교) is a six-lane two-way bridge over the Han River in Seoul, South Korea. The bridge links the Mapo and Yeongdeungpo districts. It is supported in the middle as it passes over the protected islets of Bamseom.

== History ==
Construction of Soegang Bridge began in 1980, but was halted after 1983. Construction resumed 10 years later in 1993, and the bridge opened at the end of 1996, absorbing traffic due to the partial closure of Yanghwa Bridge.

It was initially designed as a cable-stayed bridge, but due to the financial problems of the Seoul Metropolitan Government and the unsecured connection road, the construction was halted in 1983 with only 17 piers having been built. Later, due to the hosting of the 1988 Seoul Olympics, construction was no longer a budget priority and the partially constructed bridge was neglected for 10 years. It also earned the stigma of being called 'the hideous sight of Seoul and the monster of the Han River. Construction resumed in 1993 to relieve Seoul's traffic problems.

However, because the bridge was being built through Bamseom, there was opposition from environmental groups who were concerned that migratory birds would disappear, and the construction method was changed to reflect this. In the 150m section where Bamseom is located, it was decided to build a Nielsen arch bridge. The remaining sections were to be constructed using a continuous extrusion method that pushes out concrete boxes, and the Gangbuk section was to be constructed with a steel box bridge. Additionally, to protect migratory birds, construction was halted from April to June when migratory birds breed.

=== Timeline ===
- 7 June 1980 : Construction began
- 30 December 1996 : Yanghwa Bridge opened early due to some traffic restrictions. However, at that time, the northern end of Sogang Bridge was only accessible via Gangbyeonbuk-ro.
- 30 April 1997 : A temporary bridge was installed connecting the northern end of Sogang Bridge and Sinchon Intersection ahead of the demolition of the old Yanghwa Bridge.
- October 1998 : The access road to the northern end of Soegang Bridge opened, and the temporary bridge was demolished.

== Soegang Bridge and Bamseom Island ==
Soegang Bridge is a route that crosses Bamseom, a famous migratory bird destination. There is an arch-shaped structure built in this section, indicating that this is Bamseom.

In the early days of the opening of Soegang Bridge, it was pointed out that the Bamseom ecosystem was being damaged by noise and by exhaust from vehicles passing over Soegang Bridge.

== See also ==
- Bamseom
- Yanghwa Bridge
- 1988 Seoul Olympics

== Gallery ==
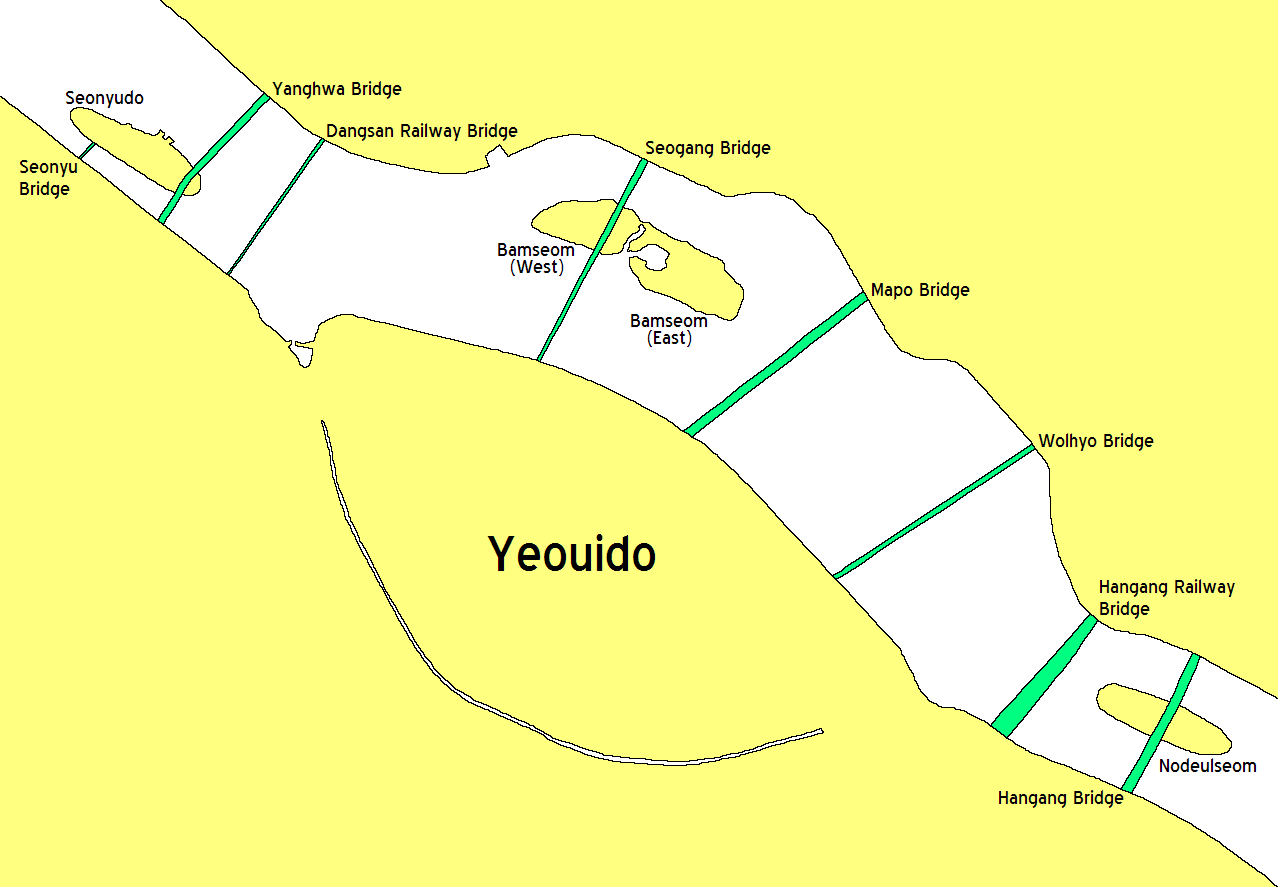

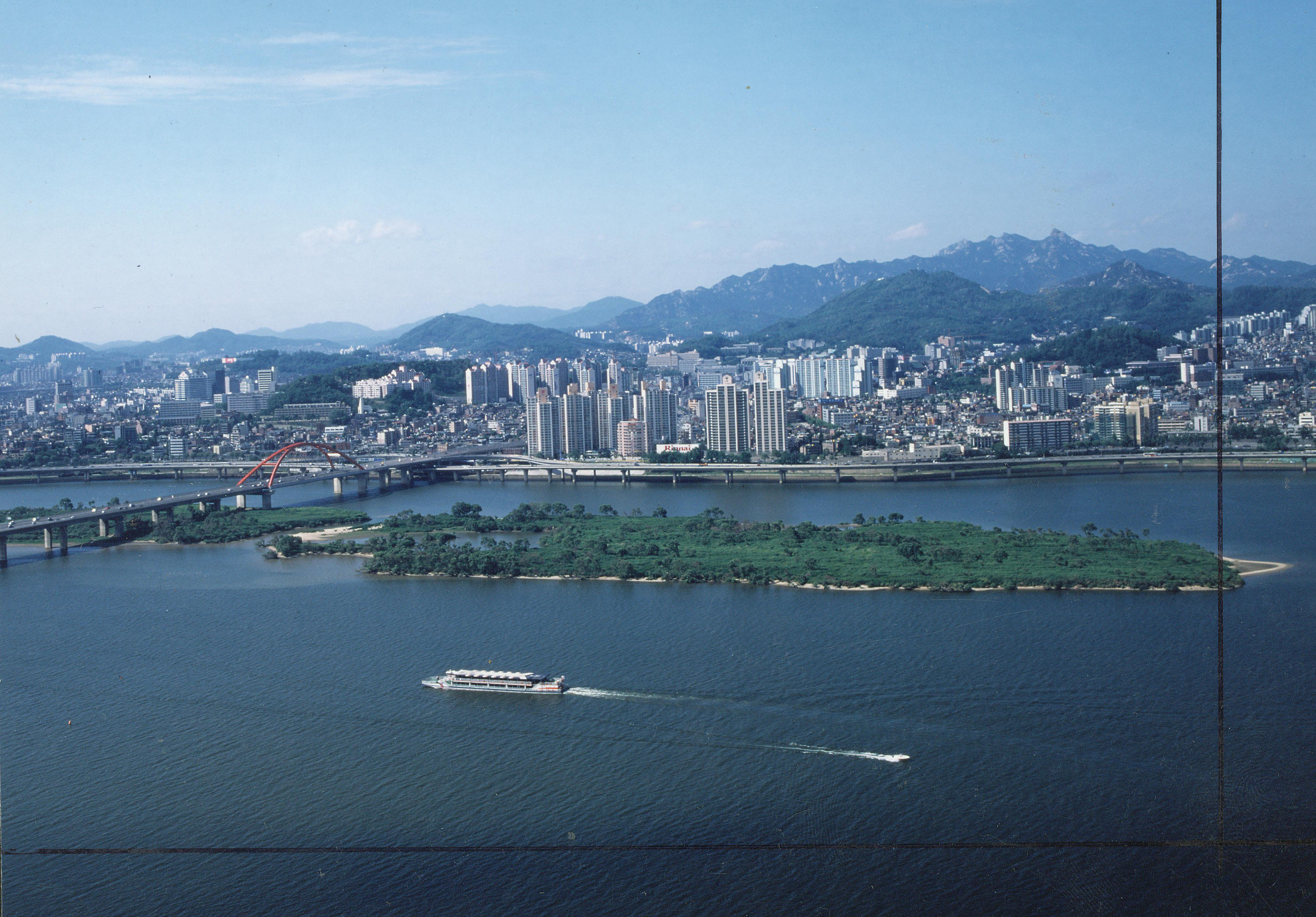

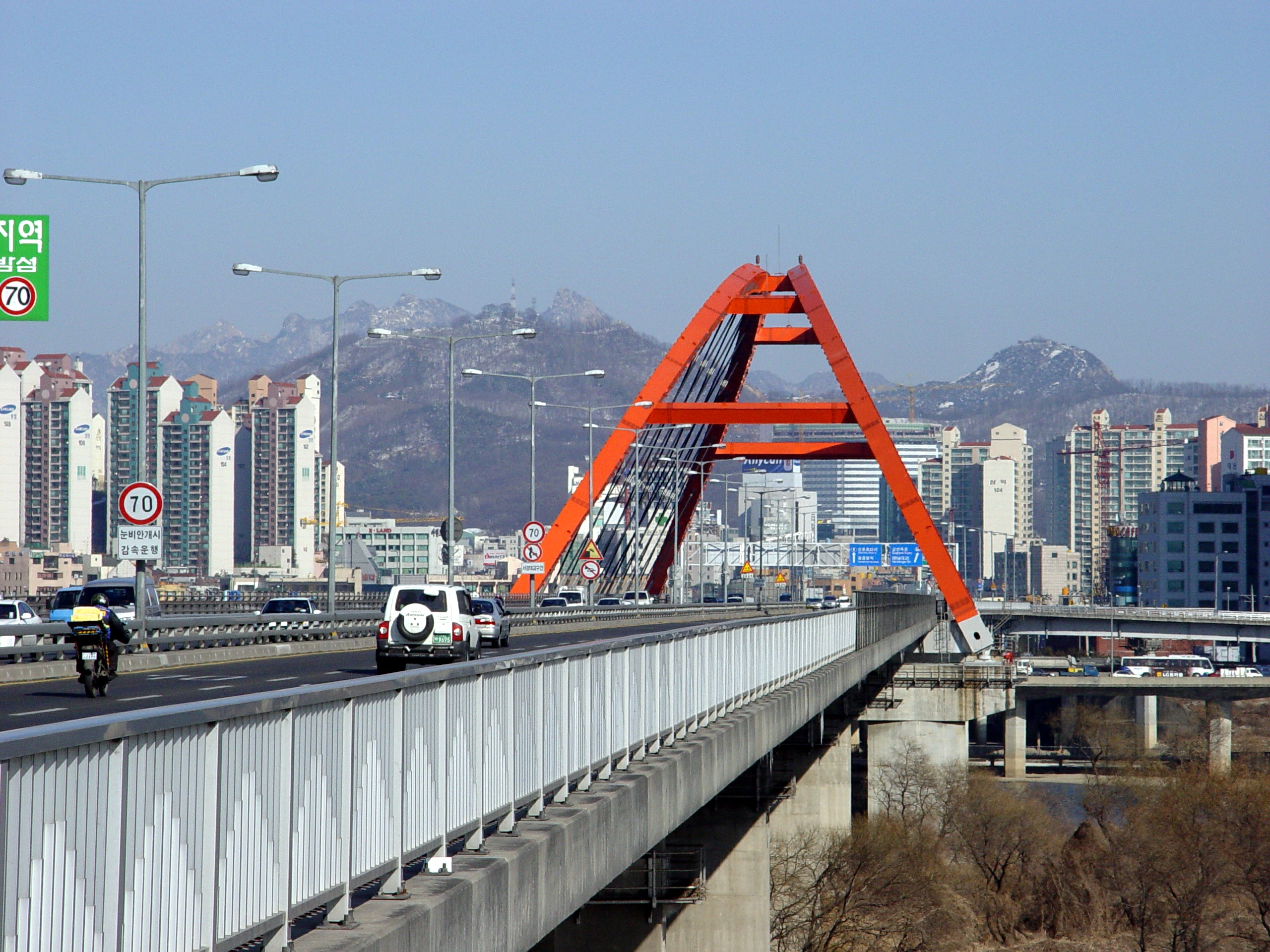
Seogang Bridge and Bukhansan from Bamseom

Frame of bridge
