= Seongsan Bridge =

Road bridge in Seoul, South Korea

Coordinates: 37.5522°N 126.8912°E

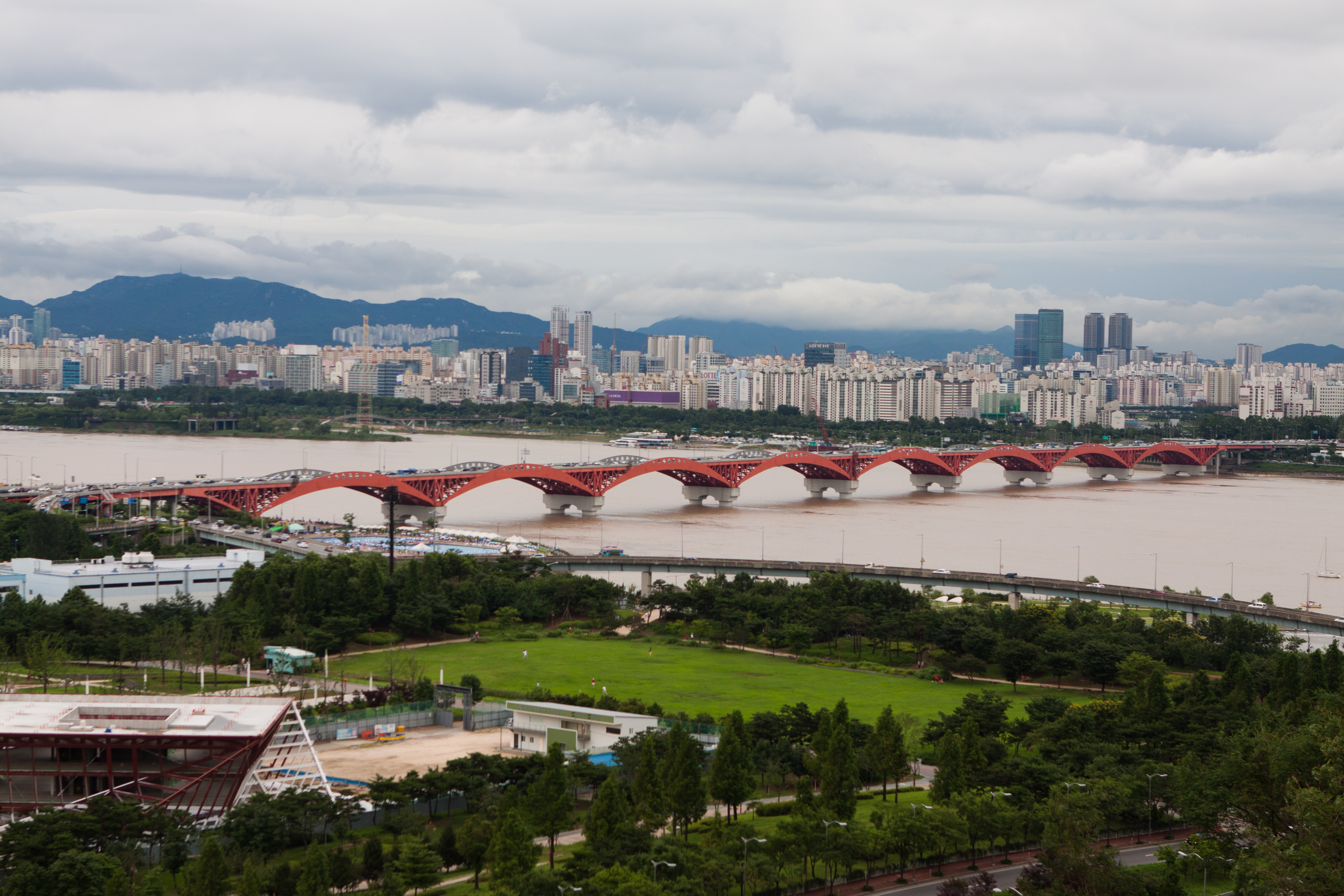
- Seongsan Bridge in 2011

Korean name
- Hangul: 성산대교
- Hanja: 城山大橋
- RR: Seongsan daegyo
- MR: Sŏngsan taegyo

The Seongsan Bridge (Korean: 성산대교) is a bridge over the Han River in Seoul, South Korea. It connects Mapo District and Yeongdeungpo District. The bridge was completed in June 1980. It has a length of 1,410 m (4,630 ft).
