= Cheonseongjinseong =

Fortress in Busan, South Korea

Coordinates: 35.03025°N 128.81855°E

Cheonseongjinseong 천성진성
- Gangseo District, Busan, South Korea
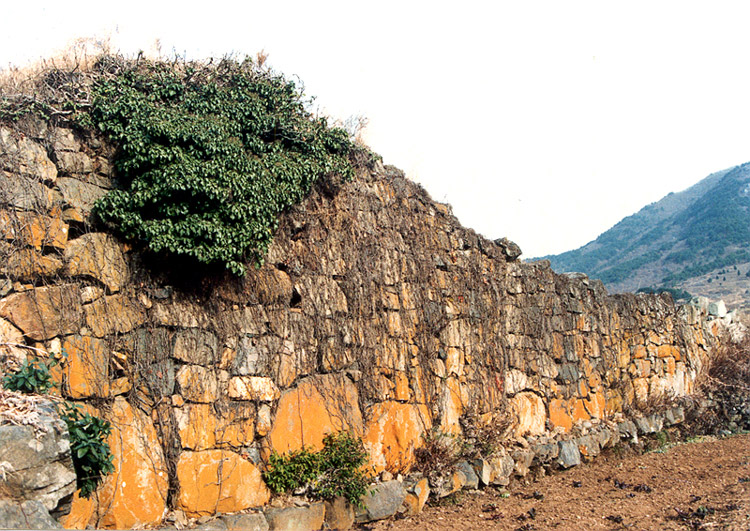
- Cheonseongjinseong Fortress

Site information
- Type: Korean castle

Location
- Height: 3.5m

Site history
- Built: 1544
- Built by: Government of Joseon
- Materials: stone, wood, plaster walls

- Cheonseongjinseong
- Hangul: 천성진성
- Hanja: 天城鎭城
- RR: Cheonseongjinseong
- MR: Ch'ŏnsŏngjinsŏng

The Cheonseongjinseong (Korean: 천성진성) is a historic fortress located on the island Gadeokdo, Gangseo District, Busan, South Korea.

Gadeokdo Island area was strategically important, being located at the end of the sea route from Tsushima Islands of Japan to Busan and Jinhae, and thus had been vulnerable to Japanese marauders from ancient times. After the riots of 1510 by the Japanese residents in the three southern ports which were open for trade with Japan, plans to construct a fortress to defend the area were seriously discussed. The need for a fortress came to be felt even more acutely after the Japanese aggression of Saryangjin in 1544. A breakwater was thus constructed to shelter naval vessels and a fortress was built to accommodate naval forces. It fell to the Japanese, however, during their invasions of 1592–98 and was repaired later. The remaining wall of the fortress is 960m in circumference, 4.5m in thickness and 3.5m in height. Gates reinforced with barbicans are located at the west, south and north points. The east part of the fortress is surrounded by walls of double layers with no gate. There are redoubts at the corners of the wall and at each side of the gates to make the fortress more easily defensible. There are also traces of moats outside the wall. This fortress is valuable remains revealing much information about fortress constructions during the middle Joseon period.

The fortress was erected as a coastal defence in 1544. Adsmiral Yi Sun-sin stayed at the fortress the night before his victory at the 1592 Battle of Busan. Excavations at the site have been carried out since 2016; the remains of a guesthouse have been found. The fortress was originally rectangular in shape but an extension was later made to the east side, possibly for use as a training area for horses. The wall of the extended part of the fortress is 2.4 metres (7 ft 10 in) thick.
