= National highways of South Korea =

South Korea has a nationwide system of national highways (Korean: 국도; Hanja: 國道; RR: Gukdo), officially called as General national highways (Korean: 일반국도; Hanja: 一般國道; RR: Ilbangukdo), distinct from the expressways. The Ministry of Land, Transport and Maritime Affairs and other government agencies administer the national highways.

== List of national highways ==
| Sign | Link | Origin | Terminus | Major Cities | Total Length(km) |
|---|---|---|---|---|---|
| nr 1 | National Route 1 | Mokpo, South Jeolla Province | Paju, Gyeonggi Province | Muan, Hampyeong, Naju, Gwangju, Jangseong, Jeongeup, Gimje, Jeonju, Wanju, Iksan, Nonsan, Gyeryong, Daejeon, Gongju, Sejong City, Cheonan, Pyeongtaek, Osan, Hwaseong, Suwon, Uiwang, Anyang, Seoul, Goyang | 509.9 km (North Korea jurisdiction is excluded.) |
| nr 2 | National Route 2 | Sinan, South Jeolla Province | Jung-gu, Busan | Mokpo, Muan, Yeongam, Gangjin, Jangheung, Boseong, Suncheon, Gwangyang, Hadong, Jinju, Changwon | 477.4 km |
| nr 3 | National Route 3 | Namhae, South Gyeongsang Province | Cheorwon, Gangwon Province | Sacheon, Jinju, Sancheong, Hamyang, Geochang, Gimcheon, Sangju, Mungyeong, Goesan, Chungju, Eumseong, Yeoju, Icheon, Gwangju, Seongnam, Seoul, Uijeongbu, Yangju, Dongducheon, Yeoncheon | 540.9 km (North Korea jurisdiction is excluded.) |
| nr 4 | National Route 4 | Buan, North Jeolla Province | Gyeongju, North Gyeongsang Province | Seocheon, Buyeo, Nonsan, Gyeryong, Daejeon, Okcheon, Yeongdong, Gimcheon, Chilgok, Daegu, Gyeongsan, Yeongcheon | 417.9 km |
| nr 5 | National Route 5 | Namhae, South Gyeongsang Province | Cheorwon, Gangwon Province | Changwon, Haman, Changnyeong, Daegu, Chilgok, Gunwi, Uiseong, Andong, Yeongju, Danyang, Jecheon, Wonju, Hoengseong, Hongcheon, Chuncheon, Hwacheon | 576.5 km (North Korea jurisdiction is excluded.) |
| nr 6 | National Route 6 | Jung-gu, Incheon | Gangneung, Gangwon Province | Bucheon, Seoul, Guri, Namyangju, Yangpyeong, Hoengseong, Pyeongchang | 274.3 km |
| nr 7 | National Route 7 | Jung-gu, Busan | Goseong, Gangwon Province | Yangsan, Ulsan, Gyeongju, Pohang, Yeongdeok, Uljin, Samcheok, Donghae, Gangneung, Yangyang, Sokcho | 484.3 km (North Korea jurisdiction is excluded.) |
| nr 11 | National Route 11 | Gangseo-gu, Busan (Gadeok Island Airport) | Gangseo-gu, Busan (Songjeong Overpass IS) | | 11.9 km |
| nr 12 | National Route 12 | Gunsan, North Jeolla Province | Gimje, North Jeolla Province | | 34.2 km |
| nr 13 | National Route 13 | Wando, South Jeolla Province | Geumsan, South Chungcheong Province | Haenam, Gangjin, Yeongam, Naju, Gwangju, Damyang, Gokseong, Namwon, Sunchang, Imsil, Jangsu, Jinan | 308.9 km |
| nr 14 | National Route 14 | Geoje, South Gyeongsang Province | Pohang, North Gyeongsang Province | Tongyeong, Goseong, Changwon, Gimhae, Busan, Ulsan, Gyeongju | 315.9 km |
| nr 15 | National Route 15 | Goheung, South Jeolla Province (Naro Space Center) | Namwon, North Jeolla Province | Suncheon, Boseong, Hwasun, Gokseong | 223.5 km |
| nr 16 | National Route 16 | Gunwi, Daegu | Cheongsong, North Gyeongsang Province | | 59.3 km |
| nr 17 | National Route 17 | Yeosu, South Jeolla Province | Gwangju, Gyeonggi Province | Suncheon, Gurye, Gokseong, Namwon, Imsil, Wanju, Jeonju, Geumsan, Daejeon, Cheongju, Jincheon, Anseong | 437.6 km |
| nr 18 | National Route 18 | Jindo, South Jeolla Province | Gurye, South Jeolla Province | Haenam, Gangjin, Jangheung, Boseong, Suncheon, Gokseong | 282.6 km |
| nr 19 | National Route 19 | Namhae, South Gyeongsang Province | Hongcheon, Gangwon Province | Hadong, Gurye, Namwon, Jangsu, Muju, Yeongdong, Okcheon, Boeun, Cheongju, Goesan, Chungju, Wonju, Hoengseong | 494.6 km |
| nr 20 | National Route 20 | Sancheong, South Gyeongsang Province | Pohang, North Gyeongsang Province | Uiryeong, Hapcheon, Changnyeong, Cheongdo, Gyeongju | 230.2 km |
| nr 21 | National Route 21 | Namwon, North Jeolla Province | Icheon, Gyeonggi Province | Sunchang, Jeongeup, Gimje, Wanju, Jeonju, Iksan, Gunsan, Seocheon, Boryeong, Hongseong, Yesan, Asan, Cheonan, Jincheon, Eumseong | 430.9 km |
| nr 22 | National Route 22 | Jeongeup, South Jeolla Province | Suncheon, South Jeolla Province | Gochang, Yeonggwang, Hampyeong, Gwangju, Hwasun | 204.5 km |
| nr 23 | National Route 23 | Gangjin, South Jeolla Province | Cheonan, South Chungcheong Province | Jangheung, Yeongam, Naju, Hampyeong, Yeonggwang, Gochang, Buan, Gimje, Iksan, Nonsan, Gongju, Sejong City | 395.7 km |
| nr 24 | National Route 24 | Sinan, South Jeolla Province | Nam-gu, Ulsan | Muan, Hampyeong, Jangseong, Damyang, Sunchang, Namwon, Hamyang, Geochang, Hapcheon, Changnyeong, Miryang | 414.5 km |
| nr 25 | National Route 25 | Changwon, South Gyeongsang Province | Cheongju, North Chungcheong Province | Gimhae, Miryang, Cheongdo, Gyeongsan, Daegu, Chilgok, Gumi, Uiseong, Sangju, Boeun | 326 km |
| nr 26 | National Route 26 | Gunsan, North Jeolla Province | Seo-gu, Daegu | Iksan, Gimje, Jeonju, Wanju, Jinan, Jangsu, Hamyang, Geochang, Hapcheon, Goryeong | 235.6 km |
| nr 27 | National Route 27 | Wando, South Jeolla Province | Gunsan, North Jeolla Province | Boseong, Suncheon, Gokseong, Sunchang, Imsil, Wanju, Jeonju, Iksan | 287.5 km |
| nr 28 | National Route 28 | Yeongju, North Gyeongsang Province | Pohang, North Gyeongsang Province | Yecheon, Uiseong, Gunwi, Yeongcheon, Gyeongju | 204.8 km |
| nr 29 | National Route 29 | Boseong, South Jeolla Province | Seosan, South Chungcheong Province | Hwasun, Gwangju, Damyang, Sunchang, Jeongeup, Buan, Gimje, Gunsan, Seocheon, Buyeo, Cheongyang, Yesan, Hongseong | 330.1 km |
| nr 30 | National Route 30 | Buan, North Jeolla Province | Seo-gu, Daegu | Gimje, Jeongeup, Imsil, Jinan, Muju, Gimcheon, Seongju | 355.1 km |
| nr 31 | National Route 31 | Gijang, Busan | Yanggu, Gangwon Province | Ulsan, Gyeongju, Pohang, Cheongsong, Yeongyang, Bonghwa, Taebaek, Yeongwol, Pyeongchang, Hongcheon, Inje | 627.6 km (North Korea jurisdiction is excluded.) |
| nr 32 | National Route 32 | Taean, South Chungcheong Province | Jung-gu, Daejeon | Seosan, Dangjin, Yesan, Gongju, Sejong City | 180.7 km |
| nr 33 | National Route 33 | Goseong, South Gyeongsang Province | Gumi, North Gyeongsang Province | Sacheon, Jinju, Sancheong, Uiryeong, Hapcheon, Goryeong, Seongju, Chilgok | 211.3 km |
| nr 34 | National Route 34 | Dangjin, South Chungcheong Province | Yeongdeok, North Gyeongsang Province | Asan, Cheonan, Anseong, Jincheon, Jeongpyeong, Goesan, Mungyeong, Yecheon, Andong, Cheongsong | 311.5 km |
| nr 35 | National Route 35 | Buk-gu, Busan | Gangneung, Gangwon Province | Yangsan, Ulsan, Gyeongju, Yeongcheon, Cheongsong, Andong, Bonghwa, Taebaek, Samcheok, Jeongseon | 458.6 km |
| nr 36 | National Route 36 | Boryeong, South Chungcheong Province | Uljin, North Gyeongsang Province | Cheongyang, Gongju, Sejong City, Cheongju, Jeungpyeong, Eumseong, Chungju, Jecheon, Danyang, Yeongju, Bonghwa | 356.3 km |
| nr 37 | National Route 37 | Geochang, South Gyeongsang Province | Paju, Gyeonggi Province | Muju, Geumsan, Okcheon, Boeun, Sangju, Goesan, Eumseong, Icheon, Yeoju, Yangpyeong, Gapyeong, Pocheon, Yeoncheon | 448.2 km |
| nr 38 | National Route 38 | Taean, South Chungcheong Province | Donghae, Gangwon Province | Dangjin, Asan, Pyeongtaek, Anseong, Icheon, Eumseong, Chungju, Jecheon, Yeongwol, Jeongseon, Taebaek, Samcheok | 411 km |
| nr 39 | National Route 39 | Buyeo, South Chungcheong Province | Uijeongbu, Gyeonggi Province | Cheongyang, Gongju, Asan, Pyeongtaek, Hwaseong, Ansan, Siheung, Bucheon, Incheon, Seoul, Goyang, Yangju | 225.4 km |
| nr 40 | National Route 40 | Dangjin, South Chungcheong Province | Gongju, South Chungcheong Province | Yesan, Hongseong, Boryeong, Buyeo | 145.6 km |
| nr 42 | National Route 42 | Jung-gu, Incheon | Donghae, Gangwon Province | Siheung, Ansan, Suwon, Yongin, Icheon, Yeoju, Wonju, Hoengseong, Pyeongchang, Jeongseon, Gangneung | 336.1 km |
| nr 43 | National Route 43 | Sejong City | Cheorwon, Gangwon Province | Gongju, Cheonan, Asan, Pyeongtaek, Hwaseong, Suwon, Yongin, Gwangju, Hanam, Seoul, Guri, Namyangju, Uijeongbu, Pocheon | 277.2 km (North Korea jurisdiction is excluded.) |
| nr 44 | National Route 44 | Yangpyeong, Gyeonggi Province | Yangyang, Gangwon Province | Hongcheon, Inje | 137.2 km |
| nr 45 | National Route 45 | Seosan, South Chungcheong Province | Gapyeong, Gyeonggi Province | Yesan, Asan, Pyeongtaek, Anseong, Yongin, Gwangju, Namyangju | 202.6 km |
| nr 46 | National Route 46 | Jung-gu, Incheon | Goseong, Gangwon Province | Bucheon, Seoul, Guri, Namyangju, Gapyeong, Chuncheon, Hwacheon, Yanggu, Inje | 281.7 km |
| nr 47 | National Route 47 | Ansan, Gyeonggi Province | Cheorwon, Gangwon Province | Gunpo, Uiwang, Anyang, Gwacheon, Seoul, Guri, Namyangju, Pocheon, Gapyeong, Pocheon | 133.8 km |
| nr 48 | National Route 48 | Ganghwa, Incheon | Jongno-gu, Seoul | Gimpo | 68 km |
| nr 56 | National Route 56 | Cheorwon, Gangwon Province | Yangyang, Gangwon Province | Hwacheon, Chuncheon, Hongcheon | 205.7 km |
| nr 58 | National Route 58 | Changwon, North Gyeongsang Province | Cheongdo, South Gyeongsang Province | Busan, Gimhae, Miryang | 82.8 km |
| nr 59 | National Route 59 | Gwangyang, South Jeolla Province | Yangyang, Gangwon Province | Hadong, Sancheong, Geochang, Hapcheon, Seongju, Gimcheon, Gumi, Sangju, Uiseong, Yecheon, Mungyeong, Danyang, Yeongwol, Jeongseon, Pyeongchang, Gangneung | 494.2 km |
| nr 67 | National Route 67 | Chilgok, North Gyeongsang Province | Gunwi, North Gyeongsang Province | Gumi | 40.5 km |
| nr 69 | National Route 69 | Yecheon, North Gyeongsang Province | Danyang County, North Chungcheong Province | | 16.6 km |
| nr 75 | National Route 75 | Gapyeong, Gyeonggi Province | Hwacheon, Gangwon Province | | 85 km |
| nr 77 | National Route 77 | Jung-gu, Busan | Paju, Gyeonggi Province | Changwon, Goseong, Tongyeong, Sacheon, Namhae, Yeosu, Goheung, Boseong, Wando, haenam, Mokpo, Sinan, Muan, Yeonggwang, Gochang, Buan, Gimje, Gunsan, Seocheon, Boryeong, Taean, Seosan, Dangjin, Asan, Pyeongtaek, Hwaseong, Ansan, Siheung, Incheon, Bucheon, Seoul, Goyang | 1239.4 km |
| nr 79 | National Route 79 | Uiryeong, South Gyeongsang Province | Changnyeong, South Gyeongsang Province | Haman, Changwon | 111.6 km |
| nr 82 | National Route 82 | Pyeongtaek, Gyeonggi Province | Hwaseong, Gyeonggi Province | | 31.2 km |
| nr 85 | National Route 85 | Gimcheon, North Gyeongsang Province | Yecheon County, North Gyeongsang Province | | 93.5 km |
| nr 87 | National Route 87 | Pocheon, Gyeonggi Province | Cheorwon, Gangwon Province | | 61.1 km |
| nr 88 | National Route 88 | Yeongyang, North Gyeongsang Province | Uljin, North Gyeongsang Province | | 38.5 km |

=== Abolished national highways ===
| Sign | Number of route | Origin | Terminus | Notes |
|---|---|---|---|---|
| nr 11 | National Route 11 | Jeju City, Jeju Province | Seogwipo, Jeju Province | Downgraded to Local Route 1131 on 17 November 2008 |
| nr 12 | National Route 12 | Loop around Jeju Island | | Downgraded to Local Route 1132 on 17 November 2008 |
| nr 16 | National Route 16 | Loop around Jeju Island | | Downgraded to Local Route 1136 on 17 November 2008 |
| nr 78 | National Route 78 | Manpo, Chagang Province | Kanggye, Chagang Province | Located in North Korea; cancelled on 1 July 1996 |
| nr 95 | National Route 95 | Jeju City, Jeju Province | Seogwipo, Jeju Province | Downgraded to Local Route 1135 on 17 November 2008 |
| nr 99 | National Route 99 | Jeju City, Jeju Province | Seogwipo, Jeju Province | Downgraded to Local Route 1139 on 17 November 2008 |

== Hypothetical national highways on the territory of DPR Korea in the case of reunification ==
| Sign | Link | Origin | Terminus | Major cities | Total length |
|---|---|---|---|---|---|
| nr 8 | National Route 8 | Monggŭmp'o, South Hwanghae Province | Wonsan, Kangwon Province | Changyon, Unnyul, Nampo, Pyongyang, Yangdok, Tokwon | 373 km |
| nr 9 | National Route 9 | Pukchong, South Hamgyong Province | Hyesan, Ryanggang Province | Kimhyonggwon, Kapsan | 216 km |
| nr 10 | National Route 10 | Ryongchon, North Pyongan Province | Onsong, North Hamgyong Province | Sinuiju, Uiju, Sakchu, Pyoktong, Chosan, Kanggye, Chasong, Kimhyongjik, Samsu, Hyesan, Musan, Hoeryong, Chongsong | 1,162 km |
| nr 41 | National Route 41 | Kaesong, North Hwanghae Province | Wonsan, Kangwon Province | Kumchon, Ichon, Tokwon | 217 km |
| nr 50 | National Route 50 | Ongjin, South Hwanghae Province | Kaesong, North Hwanghae Province | Haeju, Yonan | 133 km |
| nr 51 | National Route 51 | Haeju, South Hwanghae Province | Sukchon, South Pyongan Province | Chaeryong, Nampo, Kangso, Pyongwon | 220 km |
| nr 52 | National Route 52 | Changyon, South Hwanghae Province | Singye, North Hwanghae Province | Haeju, Pyongsan | 194 km |
| nr 53 | National Route 53 | Singye, North Hwanghae Province | Pyongyang | Suan, Chunghwa | 153 km |
| nr 54 | National Route 54 | Changyon, South Hwanghae Province | Sariwon, North Hwanghae Province | Sinchon, Chaeryong | 78 km |
| nr 61 | National Route 61 | Chongju, North Pyongan Province | Chongsu, North Pyongan Province | Kusong, Sakchu | 135 km |
| nr 62 | National Route 62 | Sukchon, South Pyongan Province | Kumya, South Hamgyong Province | Sunchon, Maengsan | 237 km |
| nr 63 | National Route 63 | Sinuiju | Wiwon, Chagang Province | Pakchon, Unsan, Chosan | 414 km |
| nr 64 | National Route 64 | Uiju, North Pyongan Province | Hamhung, South Hamgyong Province | Kusong, Tokchon | 438 km |
| nr 65 | National Route 65 | Pyongyang | Chasong, Chagang Province | Sunchon, Kaechon, Huichon, Kanggye | 426 km |
| nr 71 | National Route 71 | Changjin, South Hamgyong Province | Samsu, Ryanggang Province | | |
| nr 72 | National Route 72 | Wiwon, Chagang Province | Changjin, South Hamgyong Province | Kanggye | |
| nr 73 | National Route 73 | Tanchon, South Hamgyong Province | Musan, North Hamgyong Province | Kilju | 340 km |
| nr 74 | National Route 74 | Unsan, North Pyongan Province | Tanchon, South Hamgyong Province | Kimhyonggwon | 241 km |
| nr 76 | National Route 76 | Kapsan, Ryanggang Province | Kimchaek, North Hamgyong Province | Haksong | 186 km |
| nr 80 | National Route 80 | Hyesan, Ryanggang Province | Kilju, North Hamgyong Province | | 158 km |
| nr 81 | National Route 81 | Ranam, North Hamgyong Province | Musan, North Hamgyong Province | Chongjin, Puryong | 111 km |
| nr 83 | National Route 83 | Chongjin, North Hamgyong Province | Onsong, North Hamgyong Province | Puryong, Hoeryong | 169 km |
| nr 91 | National Route 91 | Hoeryong, North Hamgyong Province | Kyongwon, North Hamgyong Province | Kyonghung | 82 km |
| nr 92 | National Route 92 | Hoeryong, North Hamgyong Province | Sonbong, Rason | Kyonghung | 87.5 km |
| nr 93 | National Route 93 | Sonbong, Rason | Kyonghung, North Hamgyong Province | | 20 km |
| nr 94 | National Route 94 | Hoeryong, North Hamgyong Province | Kyonghung, North Hamgyong Province | Chongsong | |

== See also ==
- Highway systems of South Korea
- Expressways in South Korea
- Local highways of South Korea
