= National Route 87 (South Korea) =

Highway in South Korea

National Route 87
- Pocheon-Cheorwon Line 포천 - 철원선

Route information
- Length: 61.1 km (38.0 mi)
- Existed: 25 July 2001–present

Major junctions
- South end: Pocheon, Gyeonggi Province
- North end: Cheorwon County, Gangwon Province

Location
- Country: South Korea

Highway system
- Highway systems of South Korea; Expressways; National; Local

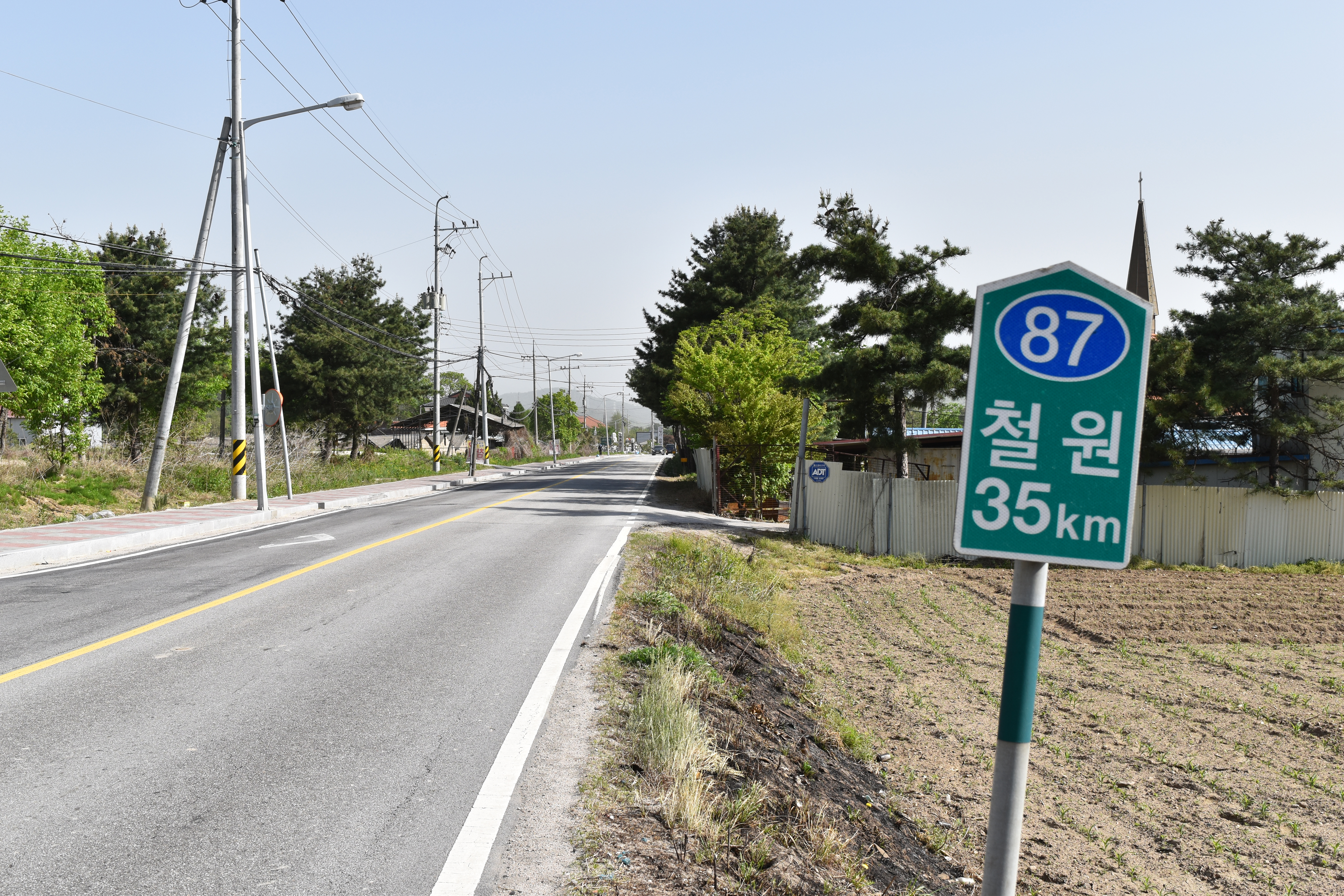
National Route 87 at the point to distance 35 km from Cheorwon

National Route 87 is a national highway in South Korea connects Pocheon to Cheorwon County. It opened on 25 July 2001.

== Main stopovers ==
Gyeonggi Province

- Pocheon

Gangwon Provinve

- Cheorwon County

== Major intersections ==
- (■): Motorway

IS: Intersection, IC: Interchange

=== Gyeonggi Province ===
Name	Hangul name	Connection	Location		Note
Naechon Overpass	내촌육교	National Route 47; Prefectural Route 98; Prefectural Route 364 (Geumgang-ro)	Pocheon City	Naechon-myeon	Terminus; Prefectural Route 98, 364 overlap
Gojangchon IS	고장촌삼거리	Naejin-ro	Pocheon City	Naechon-myeon	Prefectural Route 98, 364 overlap
Sinnaechon Bridge Jinmok Bridge	신내촌교 진목교		Pocheon City	Naechon-myeon	Prefectural Route 98, 364 overlap
Jinmok IS	진목사거리	Prefectural Route 98 (Buheung-ro); Naejin-ro	Pocheon City	Naechon-myeon	Prefectural Route 98, 364 overlap
Jinmok 4-ri IS	진목4리 교차로	Jingeum-ro; Pocheon-ro 427beon-gil	Pocheon City	Naechon-myeon	Prefectural Route 364 overlap
Ugeum IS	우금삼거리	Jingeum-ro	Pocheon City	Gasan-myeon	Prefectural Route 364 overlap
Geumhyeon IS	금현사거리	Uhyeon-ro	Pocheon City	Gasan-myeon	Prefectural Route 364 overlap
Dolmen IS	고인돌사거리	Uhyeon-ro; Mahyeon-gil; Pocheon-ro 736beon-gil	Pocheon City	Gasan-myeon	Prefectural Route 364 overlap
Gasan 2 IS	가산2 교차로	Prefectural Route 360 (Gasan-ro); Prefectural Route 364 (Gwangam ~ Masan Motorway)	Pocheon City	Gasan-myeon	Prefectural Route 364 overlap
Majeon Bridge	마전교		Pocheon City	Gasan-myeon	
Majeon Bridge			Pocheon City	Gunnae-myeon	
Majeon 1-ri maeul Entrance IS	마전1리마을입구 교차로	Pocheon-ro 909beon-gil Pocheon-ro 912beon-gil	Pocheon City	Gunnae-myeon	
Yugyo 1 IS	유교1 교차로	Majeon-gil; Yeonjeongmal-gil	Pocheon City	Gunnae-myeon	
Yugyo 2 IS	유교2 교차로		Pocheon City	Gunnae-myeon	
Jwaui IS	좌의 교차로	Yugyo-ro; Pocheon-ro 1160beon-gil	Pocheon City	Gunnae-myeon	
Yongjeong IS	용정 교차로	Yongdu-ro; Yongjeong-gil	Pocheon City	Gunnae-myeon	
Yongjeong 2 Overpass	용정2육교		Pocheon City	Gunnae-myeon	
Gueup IS	구읍 교차로	Seonjeongbi-ro	Pocheon City	Gunnae-myeon	
Pocheon IC	포천 나들목	Sejong-Pocheon Expressway; Yongjeonggyeongje-ro 2-gil	Pocheon City	Gunnae-myeon	
Yongjeong Bridge	용정교		Pocheon City	Gunnae-myeon	
Cheongseong IS	청성 교차로	Prefectural Route 56 (Cheonggun-ro); Yongjeonggyeongje-ro	Pocheon City	Gunnae-myeon	
Banwol Arts Hall Entrance IS	반월아트홀입구 교차로	Cheongseong-ro	Pocheon City	Gunnae-myeon	
Hannae IS	한내사거리	National Route 43 (Hoguk-ro)	Pocheon City	Gunnae-myeon	
Hannae Bridge	한내교		Pocheon City	Gunnae-myeon	
Hannae Bridge			Pocheon City	Pocheon-dong	
Guhannae IS	구한내사거리	Jungang-ro	Pocheon City	Pocheon-dong	
Health Center IS	보건소사거리	Wangbang-ro	Pocheon City	Pocheon-dong	
Pocheon Hospital IS	포천병원앞 교차로		Pocheon City	Pocheon-dong	
Muleogogae	물어고개		Pocheon City	Pocheon-dong	
Muleogogae			Pocheon City	Sinbuk-myeon	
Simgok-ri	심곡리	Gipiul-ro	Pocheon City	Sinbuk-myeon	
Simgok Bridge	심곡교		Pocheon City	Sinbuk-myeon	
Hasimgok IS	하심곡사거리	Prefectural Route 368 (Cheongsin-ro)	Pocheon City	Sinbuk-myeon	
Oebuk Elementary School Samsung Middle School Goil Bridge Adonis Hotels Jangseung Bridge	외북초등학교 삼성중학교 고일교 아도니스리조트호텔 장승교		Pocheon City	Sinbuk-myeon	
Jangseunggeori IS	장승거리 교차로	Gayeong-ro	Pocheon City	Sinbuk-myeon	
Jangseunggeori IS		Gayeong-ro	Pocheon City	Changsu-myeon	
Janggam Bridge	장감교		Pocheon City	Changsu-myeon	
Chudong IS	추동삼거리	Oksu-ro	Pocheon City	Changsu-myeon	
Jingun Bridge IS	진군교사거리	National Route 37 (Jeonyeong-ro); Prefectural Route 372 (Cheongchang-ro)	Pocheon City	Changsu-myeon	National Route 37 overlap
Okbyeong Bridge	옥병교		Pocheon City	Changsu-myeon	National Route 37 overlap
Oga IS	오가 교차로	National Route 37 (Jeonyeong-ro)	Pocheon City	Changsu-myeon	National Route 37 overlap
Bojang Elementary School (Closed)	보장초등학교 (폐교)		Pocheon City	Changsu-myeon	
Oga-ri	오가리	Banggol-gil	Pocheon City	Changsu-myeon	
Unsan-ri	운산리	Changdong-ro	Pocheon City	Changsu-myeon	
Dwitgol Bridge Jeolgol Bridge	뒷골교 절골교		Pocheon City	Changsu-myeon	
Yeongro Bridge	영로대교		Pocheon City	Changsu-myeon	
Yeongro Bridge			Pocheon City	Gwanin-myeon	
Jung 2-ri IS	중2리 교차로	Changdong-ro	Pocheon City	Gwanin-myeon	
(Jung 3-ri)	(중3리)	Changdong-ro	Pocheon City	Gwanin-myeon	
Jung-ri Bridge	중리교		Pocheon City	Gwanin-myeon	
Jung-ri IS	중리 교차로	Prefectural Route 78 (Jijangsan-gil)	Pocheon City	Gwanin-myeon	Prefectural Route 78 overlap
Samyul-ri Bridge	삼율리교		Pocheon City	Gwanin-myeon	Prefectural Route 78 overlap
Samyul IS	삼율 교차로	Prefectural Route 78 (Changdong-ro); Changdong-ro 1173beon-gil	Pocheon City	Gwanin-myeon	Prefectural Route 78 overlap
No name	(이름 없음)	Sangno-ro	Pocheon City	Gwanin-myeon	
Chogwa IS	초과사거리	Prefectural Route 387 (Changdong-ro) (Bukwon-ro)	Pocheon City	Gwanin-myeon	Continuation into Gangwon Province

=== Gangwon Province ===
Name	Hangul name	Connection	Location		Note
No name	(이름 없음)	Sangno 1-gil	Cheorwon County	Dongsong-eup	Gyeonggi Province - Gangwon Province border line
(Oji 1-ri Entrance)	(오지1리입구)	Oji-ro	Cheorwon County	Dongsong-eup	
No name	(이름 없음)	Sangno-ro	Cheorwon County	Dongsong-eup	
Geumhak IS	금학삼거리	Bugwon-ro	Cheorwon County	Dongsong-eup	
No name	(이름 없음)	Ipyeong 2-ro	Cheorwon County	Dongsong-eup	
Dongsong Intercity Bus Terminal	동송시외버스공용터미널		Cheorwon County	Dongsong-eup	
Ipyeong IS	이평사거리	Ipyeong-ro	Cheorwon County	Dongsong-eup	
Cheorwon Elementary School	철원초등학교		Cheorwon County	Cheorwon-eup	
Hwaji IS	화지삼거리	Prefectural Route 463 (Taebong-ro)	Cheorwon County	Cheorwon-eup	
No name	(이름 없음)	Yuli-ro	Cheorwon County	Cheorwon-eup	
Dopiansa IS	도피안사삼거리	Dopidong-gil	Cheorwon County	Cheorwon-eup	
Wolha IS	월하삼거리	Prefectural Route 464 (Geumgangsan-ro)	Cheorwon County	Cheorwon-eup	
Nodongdangsa IS Former Office of Workers' Party of Korea	노동당사삼거리	Geumgangsan-ro	Cheorwon County	Cheorwon-eup	
Daema IS	대마사거리	National Route 3 (Pyeonghwa-ro); Prefectural Route 463 (Myojang-ro)	Cheorwon County	Cheorwon-eup	Terminus
