= Attempted assassination of Lee Jae Myung =

2024 attack of South Korean politician

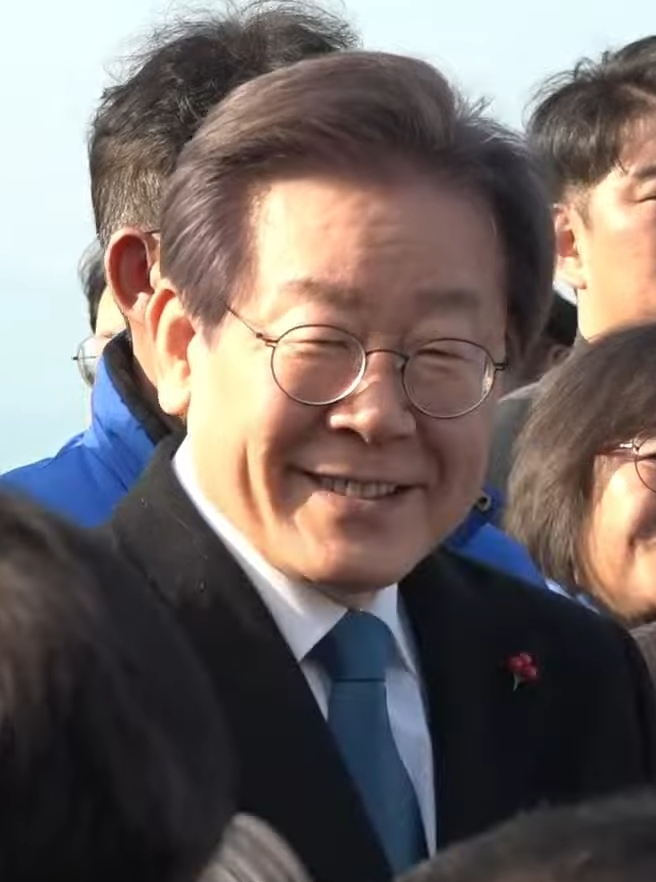
- Lee speaking on 2 January 2024, shortly before the attack
- Location: Gadeokdo, Busan, South Korea
- Date: 2 January 2024; 2 years ago 10:27 a.m. KST
- Attack type: Assassination attempt; stabbing
- Weapon: Knife
- Injuries: Lee Jae-myung
- Assailant: Kim Jin-sung

On 2 January 2024, then Democratic Party of Korea leader and future president of South Korea Lee Jae Myung was stabbed while visiting the construction site of Gadeok Island Airport in Gadeokdo, Busan. Hospitalized at Pusan National University twenty minutes after the attack, Lee was subsequently transferred by helicopter to Seoul National University Hospital in a conscious state. The suspect was arrested at the scene and said his intentions were to assassinate Lee.

== Background ==
Political violence has occurred several times before in South Korea. In 2006, then-Grand National Party leader Park Geun-hye was attacked with a knife at an event, while her father Park Chung Hee was assassinated by his spy chief in 1979. In 2015, U.S. Ambassador to South Korea Mark W. Lippert survived a stabbing attack while attending a breakfast conference in Seoul. In 2022, then-Democratic Party of Korea leader Song Young-gil was attacked with a hammer.

In 2022, Lee narrowly lost to Yoon Suk Yeol in the closest presidential election in South Korean history. Lee would later be elected president in 2025, shortly after Yoon's impeachment and removal from office.

On 7 May 2022, Lee declared his candidacy in the June 2022 South Korean by-elections running for Incheon Gyeyang District B vacant seat in the National Assembly. Lee won the seat in the elections on 1 June 2022. Afterwards, he was elected as the leader of the Democratic Party of Korea on 28 August.

At the time of the attack, Lee was being prosecuted for corruption, accusations which he denied and said were politically motivated. The attack took place nearly three months before the 2024 legislative election.

== Attack ==
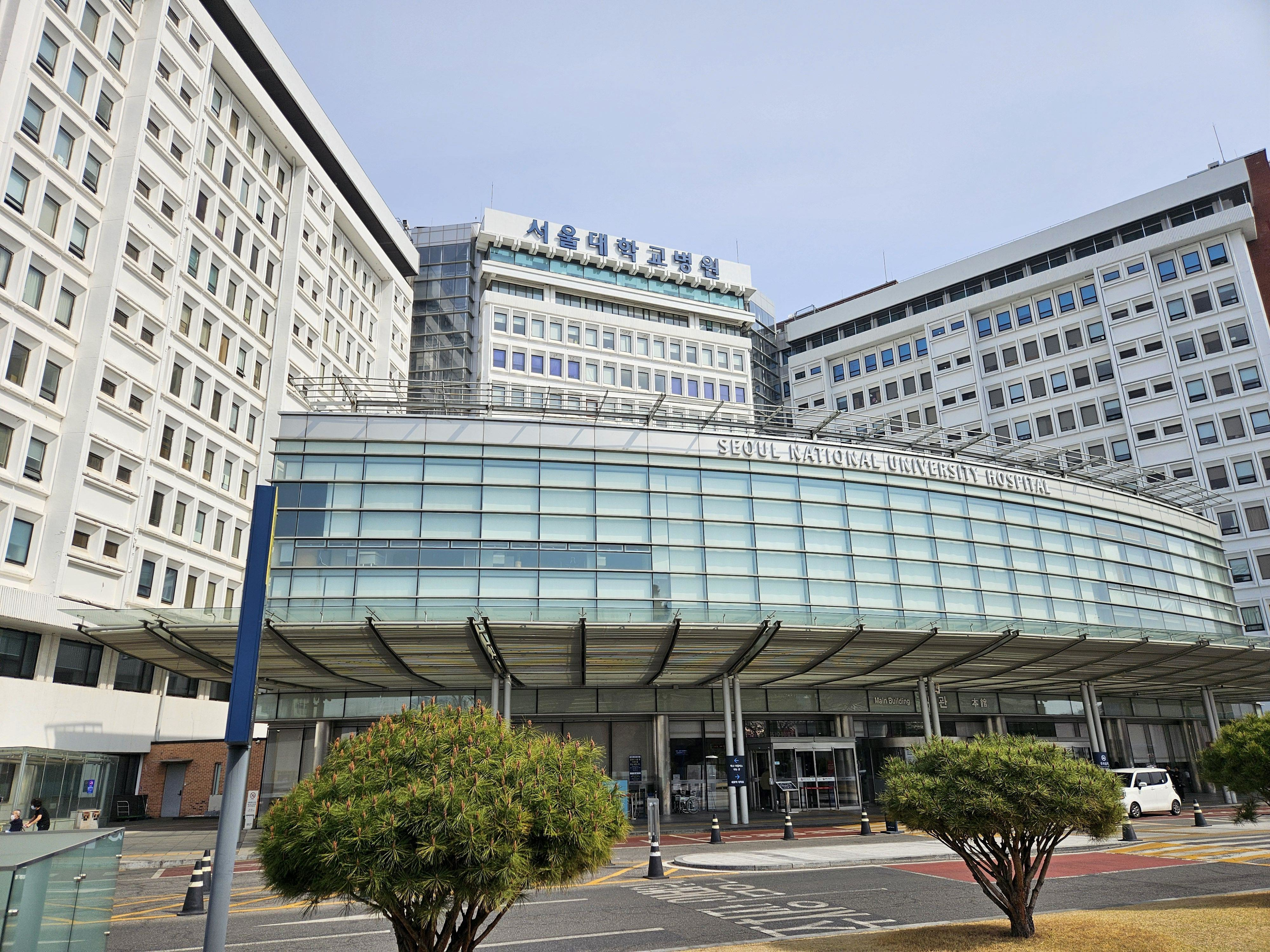
Seoul National University Hospital where Lee was transferred to from Busan and underwent surgery

On 2 January, Lee was holding a press conference at Gadeokdo New Airport. At 10:27 a.m. KST, an individual approached Lee and asked for an autograph before stabbing him on the left side of his neck. Officials at the scene immediately shielded Lee, and one of them covered his neck with a cloth. It was reported that Lee was bleeding but remained conscious. Lee was taken to an ambulance at 10:47 a.m. and arrived at the regional trauma center at Pusan National University Hospital at 11:16 a.m. He was subsequently transferred by helicopter to Seoul National University Hospital in a conscious state.

It was reported that Lee suffered a one-centimeter cut to his neck, with minor bleeding. Medical officials at Pusan National University Hospital said that Lee sustained damage to his jugular vein, and were concerned about additional massive bleeding.

Lee underwent emergency surgery at Seoul National University Hospital later in the day. Democratic Party officials said that the surgery "took longer than expected" and medical officials were closely monitoring his progress.

The event was recorded live, with video footage of the attack airing on South Korean broadcast stations.

A witness said more than a dozen police officers were present at the moment of the attack.

== Perpetrator ==
The male suspect, Kim Jin-sung, a real estate dealer who was wearing a paper crown reading "I'm Lee Jae-myung" and was carrying a sign that said "200 seats at the National Assembly", was promptly arrested. He was reported to have been born in 1957. In December 2023, he attended an event in Busan at which Lee spoke, with video footage showing him waiting for Lee, but being unable to make close contact. The suspect was wearing the same paper crown. At a news conference, police said the suspect bought his weapon online. The weapon used was described as an 18-centimeter-long knife. Democratic Party spokesman Kwon Chil-seung told a briefing that the attacker was believed to have used a sashimi knife. One media outlet reported that he refused to answer questions about his motives. Police obtained a warrant and searched his home. The Busan Metropolitan Police Agency said it planned to charge Kim with attempted murder, as he confessed his intent to kill Lee. On 5 July 2024, Kim was convicted of attempted murder and election law violations and sentenced to 15 years in prison.

== Reactions ==
President Yoon Suk Yeol called the stabbing an "act of terror... and a serious threat to democracy" and ordered an investigation into the attack. Democratic Party spokesman Kwon Chil-seung said, "This incident is a terror attack on Rep. Lee Jae-myung and a serious threat to democracy that should not happen under any circumstances."

Commissioner General Yoon Hee-keun of the National Police Agency announced the formation of a special investigation team in Busan to probe the attack.
