= National Route 11 (South Korea) =

Road in South Korea

National Route 11
- 국도 제11호선

Route information
- Length: 11.9 km (7.4 mi)
- Existed: 2 August 2024–present

Major junctions
- South end: Gadeok Island Airport, Busan
- North end: Noksan-dong, Busan

Location
- Country: South Korea

Highway system
- Highway systems of South Korea; Expressways; National; Local
← National Route 7	→ National Route 12

National Route 11 (Korean: 국도 제11호선) is a national highway in South Korea. It connects Gadeok Island Airport to Noksan-dong in Busan.

== History ==
National Route 11 was designated on 2 August 2024.

=== Previous route ===
National Route 11 previously ran from Jeju City to Seogwipo; this was downgraded to Local Road 1131 on 17 November 2008.
