= Gadeok Bridge =

Bridge in Busan, South Korea

Coordinates: 35.0784°N 128.8394°E

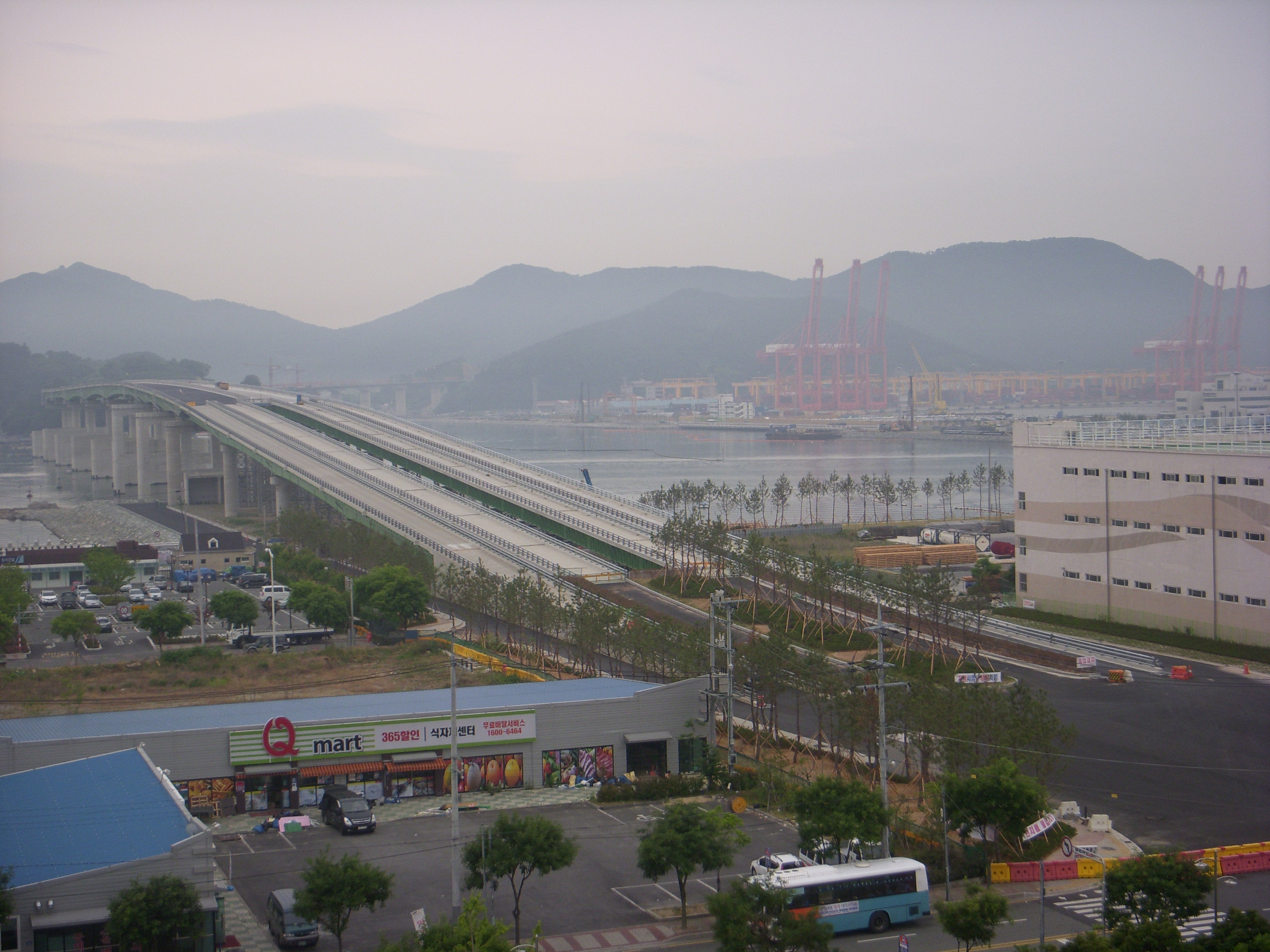

Korean name
- Hangul: 가덕대교
- Hanja: 加德大橋
- RR: Gadeok daegyo
- MR: Kadŏk taegyo

Gadeok Bridge (Korean: 가덕대교) is a bridge in Busan, South Korea which connects Songjeong-dong on the mainland of Gangseo District, Busan to Nulcha-dong on Nulchado spanning the Busan New Port. The bridge was completed in 2010. The bridge is part of Busan–Geoje Fixed Link.

The bridge is complemented by the Nulcha Bridge between Nulchado and Gadeokdo.
