= National Route 75 (South Korea) =

Road in South Korea

National Route 75
- Gapyeong-Hwacheon Line 국도 제75호선

Route information
- Length: 85 km (53 mi)
- Existed: 25 August 2001–present

Major junctions
- South end: Gapyeong County, Gyeonggi Province
- North end: Hwacheon County, Gangwon Province

Location
- Country: South Korea

Highway system
- Highway systems of South Korea; Expressways; National; Local

National Route 75 is a national highway in South Korea connects Gapyeong County to Hwacheon County. It was established on 25 August 2001.

== Main stopovers ==
Gyeonggi Province

- Gapyeong County

Gangwon Province

- Hwacheon County

== Major intersections ==
- (■): Motorway

IS: Intersection, IC: Interchange

=== Gyeonggi Province ===
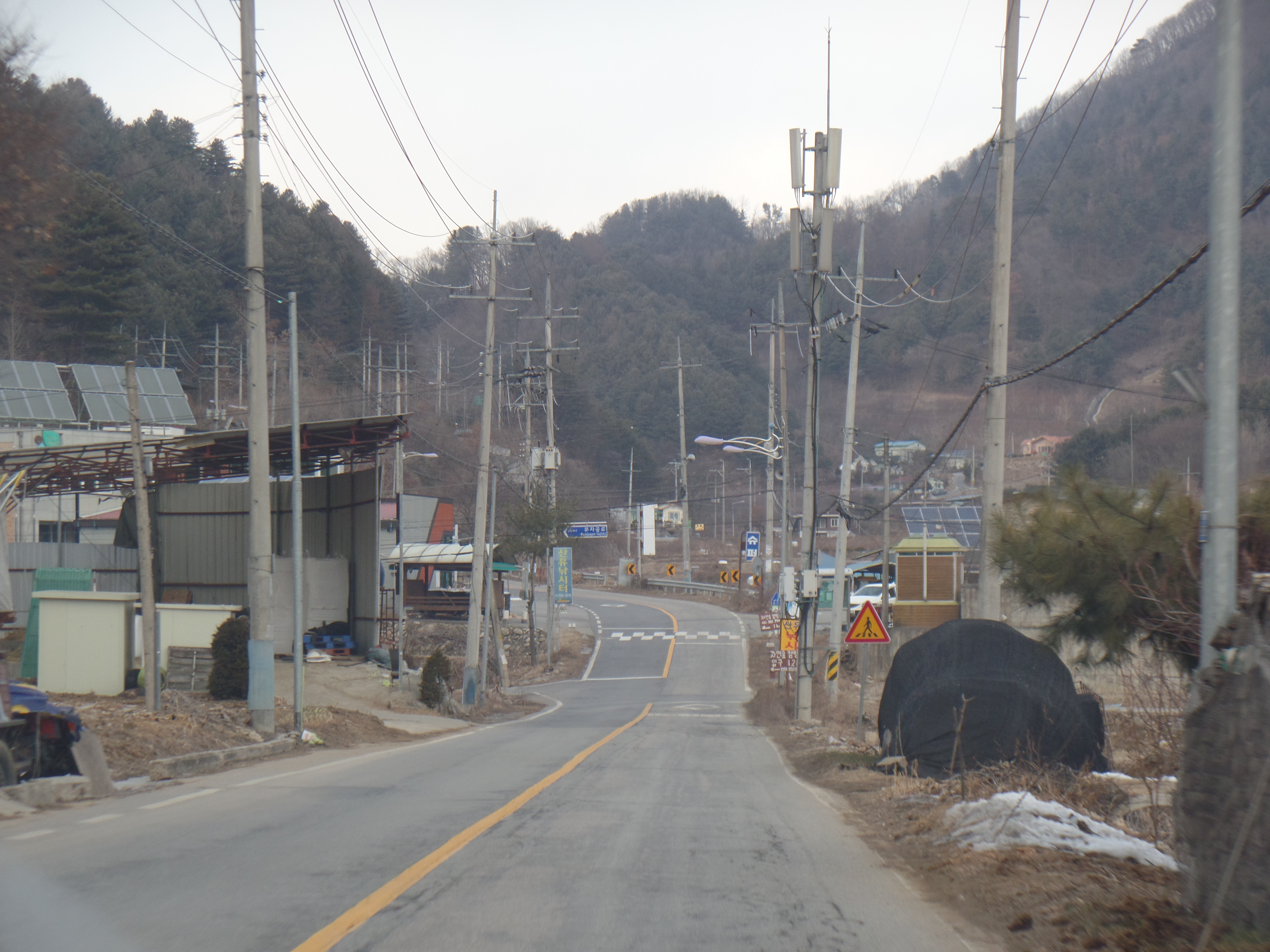
Yudong IS

Name	Hangul name	Connection	Location		Note
Sincheon IS	신천삼거리	National Route 37; Prefectural Route 86 (Yumyeong-ro)	Gapyeong County	Seorak-myeon	Terminus
Changuicheon Bridge Uleopcheon Bridge	창의천교 울업천교		Gapyeong County	Seorak-myeon	
Seorak Tunnel	설악터널		Gapyeong County	Seorak-myeon	Approximately 924m
Cheongpyeong Bridge	청평교		Gapyeong County	Seorak-myeon	
Cheongpyeong Bridge			Gapyeong County	Cheongpyeong-myeon	
No name	(이름 없음)	Prefectural Route 391 (Hoban-ro)	Gapyeong County	Cheongpyeong-myeon	Prefectural Route 391 overlap
No name	(이름 없음)	Sangji-ro	Gapyeong County	Gapyeong-eup	Prefectural Route 391 overlap
(Sanyu-ri Yudong)	(산유리유동)	Prefectural Route 391 (Bukhangangbyeon-ro)	Gapyeong County	Gapyeong-eup	Prefectural Route 391 overlap
Galchigogae Jangseunggogae	갈치고개 장승고개		Gapyeong County	Gapyeong-eup	
Hyeonchungtap	현충탑	Prefectural Route 391 (Bukhangangbyeon-ro)	Gapyeong County	Gapyeong-eup	Prefectural Route 391 overlap
Gapyeong Station IS	가평역삼거리	Munhwa-ro	Gapyeong County	Gapyeong-eup	Prefectural Route 391 overlap
Omok Bridge Gapyeong High School Entrance	오목교 가평고교입구		Gapyeong County	Gapyeong-eup	Prefectural Route 391 overlap
Gapyeong IS	가평오거리	National Route 46 (Gyeongchun-ro)	Gapyeong County	Gapyeong-eup	Prefectural Route 391 overlap
Gapyeong Fire Station	가평소방서		Gapyeong County	Gapyeong-eup	Prefectural Route 391 overlap
Eupnae Police Station IS	읍내파출소앞삼거리	Biseokgeori-gil	Gapyeong County	Gapyeong-eup	Prefectural Route 391 overlap
Gapyeong Bus Terminal Gapyeong Police Station Gapyeong-eup Office	가평터미널 가평경찰서 가평읍사무소		Gapyeong County	Gapyeong-eup	Prefectural Route 391 overlap
Eupnae IS	읍내사거리	Bonap-ro	Gapyeong County	Gapyeong-eup	Prefectural Route 391 overlap
Gapyeong Health Center Uijeongbu District Court Gapyeong County Court	가평군보건소 의정부지방법원 가평군법원		Gapyeong County	Gapyeong-eup	Prefectural Route 391 overlap
Sinmi Food IS	신미식품앞삼거리	Seokbong-ro	Gapyeong County	Gapyeong-eup	Prefectural Route 391 overlap
Gyeryang Bridge	계량교		Gapyeong County	Gapyeong-eup	Prefectural Route 391 overlap
Seungan IS	승안삼거리	Yongchu-ro	Gapyeong County	Gapyeong-eup	Prefectural Route 391 overlap
Majang Bridge	마장교	Gakdammal-gil	Gapyeong County	Gapyeong-eup	Prefectural Route 391 overlap
Norumokgogae	노루목고개		Gapyeong County	Gapyeong-eup	Prefectural Route 391 overlap
Norumokgogae			Gapyeong County	Buk-myeon	Prefectural Route 391 overlap
Mkdong Bridge	목동교		Gapyeong County	Buk-myeon	Prefectural Route 391 overlap
Mokdong IS	목동삼거리	Prefectural Route 391 (Hawaksan-ro)	Gapyeong County	Buk-myeon	Prefectural Route 391 overlap
Mokdong Bus Terminal	목동버스터미널		Gapyeong County	Buk-myeon	
Mokdong 2 Bridge	목동2교		Gapyeong County	Buk-myeon	
Baekdun-ri Entrance	백둔리입구	Baekdun-ro	Gapyeong County	Buk-myeon	
Myeonghwa-dong IS	명화동삼거리	Prefectural Route 368 (Nonnamgi-gil)	Gapyeong County	Buk-myeon	
Mokdong Elementary School Myeongji Branch Sampal Bridge	목동초등학교 명지분교 삼팔교		Gapyeong County	Buk-myeon	
Domachi	도마치		Gapyeong County	Buk-myeon	Elevation 690m Continuation into Gangwon Province

=== Gangwon Province ===
Name	Hangul name	Connection	Location		Note
Domachi	도마치		Hwacheon County	Sanae-myeon	Elevation 690m Gyeonggi Province - Gangwon Province border line
Banam Bridge	반암교		Hwacheon County	Sanae-myeon	
Gwangdeok Elementary School	광덕초등학교	Prefectural Route 463 (Pohwa-ro)	Hwacheon County	Sanae-myeon	
Sanae Middle School Sanae High School	사내중학교 사내고등학교	Prefectural Route 391 (Hawaksan-ro)	Hwacheon County	Sanae-myeon	
Sanae Police Station	사내파출소	Sanae-ro	Hwacheon County	Sanae-myeon	
Sanae-myeon Office Changam Bridge	사내면사무소 창암교		Hwacheon County	Sanae-myeon	
Sachang-ri	사창리	National Route 56; Prefectural Route 56 (Supiryeong-ro)	Hwacheon County	Sanae-myeon	Terminus
