= National Route 12 (South Korea) =

Road in South Korea

National Route 12
- 국도 제12호선

Route information
- Length: 13.9 km (8.6 mi)
- Existed: 13 November 2020–present

Major junctions
- South end: Okdo-myeon, Gunsan
- North end: Jinbong-myeon, Gimje

Location
- Country: South Korea

Highway system
- Highway systems of South Korea; Expressways; National; Local
← National Route 11	→ National Route 13

National Route 12 (Korean: 국도 제12호선) is a national highway in South Korea. It connects Okdo-myeon in Gunsan to Jinbong-myeon in Gimje. The section from Sinsido to Sinsi Intersection overlaps National Route 77 and the section from the Saemangeum Seawall to Simpo-ri is named the Sanmangeum East–West Road.

== History ==
On November 13, 2020, National Route No. 12 was constructed as the Gunsan–Gimje Line. Then on February 26, 2021, a 20.3-kilometre (12.6 mi) section of the Sanmangeum East–West Road (Simpo-ri, Jinbong-myeon, Gimje-si) opened.
