= National Route 37 (South Korea) =

Road in South Korea

National Route 37
- 국도 제37호선

Route information
- Length: 448.2 km (278.5 mi)
- Existed: 14 March 1981–present

Major junctions
- South end: Geochang, South Gyeongsang Province
- North end: Paju, Gyeonggi Province

Location
- Country: South Korea

Highway system
- Highway systems of South Korea; Expressways; National; Local

National Route 37 is a major national highway in South Korea that connects Geochang County in South Gyeongsang Province to Paju in Gyeonggi Province. It was established on 14 March 1981.

== History ==
- March 14, 1981: National Route 37, the Geochang–Munsan Line, was newly designated.
- April 6, 1981: A 186.2 km section between Dogye, Janghowon-eup, Icheon County, and Dangdong-ri, Munsan-eup, Paju County, which had been elevated to national highway status, was opened.
- April 16, 1981: A 152.159 km section between Hyeonnae-ri, Buri-myeon, Geumsan County, South Chungcheong Province, and Wangjang-ri, Gamgok-myeon, Eumseong County, North Chungcheong Province, which had been elevated to national highway status, was opened.
- May 8, 1981: A 4.7 km section between Unheung-ri and Jungbeol-ri, Hwabuk-myeon, Sangju County, which had been elevated to national highway status, was opened.
- May 12, 1981: A 27.073 km section between Gimcheon-dong, Geochang-eup, Geochang County, and Sojeong-ri, Buksang-myeon, which had been elevated to national highway status, was opened.
- May 30, 1981: The road district was determined as a newly established 405 km section following the amendment of the General National Highway Route Designation Decree by Presidential Decree No. 10247.
- September 29, 1986: The existing designated 1.5 km section through the downtown area of Geumwang-eup, Eumseong County, between Geumseok-ri and Mugeuk-ri, was abolished.
- July 21, 1987: A 1.34 km section between Geumseok-ri and Mugeuk-ri, Geumwang-eup, Eumseong County, was opened.
- February 17, 1990: The existing designated 300 m section in Punggye-ri, Janghowon-eup, Icheon County, was abolished.
- March 9, 1991: The existing designated section in Yulpo-ri, Jeokseong-myeon, Paju County, was abolished.
- November 16, 1992: A 100 m section in Sojeong-ri, Gunbuk-myeon, Okcheon County, was opened, while the existing 150 m section was abolished.
- October 4, 1994: A 510 m section in Sangji-ri, Gunseo-myeon, Okcheon County, was opened, while the existing 920 m section was abolished.
- February 21, 1995: An 11.177 km section between Yanggeun-ri, Yangpyeong-eup, Yangpyeong County, and Sincheon-ri, Seorak-myeon, Gapyeong County, was opened.
- January 8, 1996: A 2.7 km section between Huigok-ri, Seorak-myeon, and Cheongpyeong-ri, Oeseo-myeon, Gapyeong County, including Sincheongpyeong Bridge, was opened.
- July 1, 1996: The terminus was changed from "Munsan-eup, Paju County, Gyeonggi Province" to "Munsan-eup, Paju City, Gyeonggi Province".
- June 13, 1997: The 4.9 km section between Gasan-ri and Botong-ri, Daesin-myeon, Yeoju County, was designated as an automobile-only road.
- July 4, 1997: The 6.52 km Yeoju IC–Yeoju road between Jeombong-ri, Yeoju-eup, and Cheonsong-ri, Buknae-myeon, Yeoju County, was widened and opened, while the existing 500 m section between Sang-ri, Yeoju-eup, and Cheonsong-ri was abolished.
- January 5, 1998: A 1.8 km section between Hoehyeon-ri, Yangpyeong-eup, Yangpyeong County, and Bulgok-ri, Gaegun-myeon, was opened, while the existing 1.2 km section was abolished.
- March 25, 1998: A 980 m section of the dangerous-road improvement project in Seonchon-ri, Seorak-myeon, Gapyeong County, was opened.
- April 27, 1998: A 940 m section between Hano-ri and Hadang-ri, Wonnam-myeon, Eumseong County, was opened, while the existing 1.1 km section was abolished.
- May 1, 1998: Following the opening of the Icheon–Yeoju road, the existing 1.4 km section between Hongmun-ri and Sang-ri, Yeoju-eup, Yeoju County, was abolished.
- June 1, 1998: The 10.57 km section between Jungdo-ri, Geumsan-eup, Geumsan County, and Chujeong-ri, Chubu-myeon, was widened and opened, while the existing 11.73 km section was abolished.
- July 3, 1998: An 880 m section in Aseong-ri, Soso-myeon, Goesan County, was opened, while the existing 1.1 km section was abolished.
- December 31, 1998: A 745 m section of Cheongpyeong Bridge in Cheongpyeong-ri, Oeseo-myeon, Gapyeong County, and a 620 m section of Jojong Bridge in the same area were opened to traffic.
- January 1999: The existing 800 m section in Geumpa-ri, Papyeong-myeon, Paju City, was abolished.
- May 29, 1999: The 4.9 km Daesin Bypass Road between Botong-ri and Gasan-ri, Daesin-myeon, Yeoju County, was opened.
- October 15, 1999: The 3.34 km Baekui Bridge section between Baekui-ri, Cheongsan-myeon, Yeoncheon County, and Juwon-ri, Changsu-myeon, Pocheon County, was opened, while the existing section was abolished.
- November 15, 1999: The 1.02 km Yangpyeong–Yongmun road between Yanggeun-ri and Deokpyeong-ri, Yangpyeong-eup, Yangpyeong County, was widened and opened, while the existing section was abolished.
- May 8, 2000: A 400 m section in Yeonha-ri, Sang-myeon, Gapyeong County, was opened.
- December 4, 2000: A 1.13 km section in Sogye-ri, Suhan-myeon, Boeun County, was opened, while the existing 1.23 km section was abolished.
- December 21, 2000: The 6.1 km Munsan–Seonyu road between Dangdong-ri, Munsan-eup, and Yulgok-ri, Papyeong-myeon, Paju City, was widened and opened, while the existing 4.7 km section was abolished.
- December 26, 2001: A 420 m section in Myoseo-ri, Suhan-myeon, Boeun County, was opened, while the existing 440 m section was abolished.
- December 27, 2001: The 5.3 km section between Aseong-ri, Soso-myeon, and Daedeok-ri, Goesan-eup, Goesan County, was widened and opened, while the existing 5.1 km section was abolished.
- January 8, 2002: The 6.4 km section between Wangdae-ri, Neungseo-myeon, Yeoju County, and Gasan-ri, Daesin-myeon, was designated as an automobile-only road.
- April 26, 2002: The 140 m Yulgil-ri dangerous-road improvement section in Yulgil-ri, Sang-myeon, Gapyeong County, was improved and opened, while the existing 150 m section was abolished.
- October 1, 2002: The 2.2 km section between Eundae-ri, Jeongok-eup, Yeoncheon County, and Jangtan-ri, Cheongsan-myeon, was widened and opened.
- January 9, 2003: Due to the Geochang District Rural Water Development Project, a 3.58 km section between Nongsan-ri and Gaemyeong-ri, Goje-myeon, Geochang County, was relocated and opened, while the existing 1.15 km section was abolished.
- December 30, 2003: The 12 km Sinpal–Ildong road between Sinpal-ri, Naechon-myeon, Pocheon City, and Gisan-ri, Ildong-myeon, was widened and opened.
- October 1, 2004: The 4.02 km section between Dongdae-ri, Annae-myeon, Okcheon County, and Geohyeon-ri, Suhan-myeon, Boeun County, was widened and opened.
- May 10, 2005: The 3.24 km section between Ibam-ri and Suri, Soso-myeon, Goesan County, was widened and opened.
- September 14, 2006: The 3.5 km Chubu–Daejeon road between Majeon-ri and Yogwang-ri, Chubu-myeon, Geumsan County, and the 1.42 km 2006 Geumsan World Ginseng Expo support road between Jungdo-ri and Sindae-ri, Geumsan-eup, were temporarily opened.
- September 30, 2006: The 7.11 km Ildong–Yeongjung road between Gisan-ri, Ildong-myeon, and Geumju-ri, Yeongjung-myeon, Pocheon City, was widened and opened, while the existing 10.9 km section was abolished.
- December 26, 2006: The 3.5 km Chubu–Daejeon road between Majeon-ri and Yogwang-ri and the 1.42 km 2006 Geumsan World Ginseng Expo support road between Jungdo-ri and Sindae-ri were widened and opened. The existing 3.7 km Majeon-ri–Yogwang-ri section and 500 m Jungdo-ri–Sindae-ri section were abolished.
- December 27, 2006: The 17.12 km Eumseong–Saenggeuk road between Hano-ri, Wonnam-myeon, and Sinyang-ri, Saenggeuk-myeon, Eumseong County, was widened and opened.
- January 31, 2007: The 15.12 km Paju Jeokseong Bypass Road and Dupo–Cheoncheon road between Dupo-ri, Papyeong-myeon, Paju City, and Gaekhyeon-ri, Jeokseong-myeon, were widened and opened, while the existing 14.5 km section was abolished.
- July 13, 2007: The 9.816 km Yeoju Bypass Road between Hongmun-ri, Yeoju-eup, and Gasan-ri, Daesin-myeon, was widened and opened.
- December 16, 2007: Following the opening of the Yeoju Bypass Road, the existing 9.866 km section between Hongmun-ri, Yeoju-eup, and Gasan-ri, Daesin-myeon, was abolished.
- December 31, 2007: The 10.99 km Okcheon–Sojeong road between Woljeon-ri, Gunseo-myeon, Okcheon County, and Sojeong-ri, Gunbuk-myeon, was widened and opened.
- November 17, 2008: The 6.94 km section between Nucheong-ri, Boeun-eup, and Jungpan-ri, Songnisan-myeon, Boeun County, was widened and opened, while the existing 12.11 km section was abolished.
- September 15, 2010: The 6.072 km Eunhaeng–Okcheon road between Sajeong-ri and Woljeon-ri, Gunseo-myeon, Okcheon County, was widened and opened.
- November 23, 2010: The 3.8 km Mari–Songjeong road between Malheul-ri, Mari-myeon, and Songjeong-ri, Geochang-eup, Geochang County, was widened and opened, while the existing 5.2 km section was abolished.
- March 7, 2011: A 1.5 km section between Hangsa-ri and Yeonha-ri, Sang-myeon, Gapyeong County, which had been opened early, and the 9.2 km Cheongpyeong–Hyeon-ri–Sinpal road between Yeonha-ri, Sang-myeon, Gapyeong County, and Sinpal-ri, Naechon-myeon, Pocheon City, were widened and opened.
- October 20, 2011: Following the opening of the Cheongpyeong–Hyeon-ri–Sinpal road, the existing 12.8 km section between Hangsa-ri, Sang-myeon, Gapyeong County, and Sinpal-ri, Naechon-myeon, Pocheon City, was abolished.
- December 29, 2011: The 8.4 km Cheongpyeong–Hyeon-ri road between Hacheon-ri, Cheongpyeong-myeon, Gapyeong County, and Hangsa-ri, Sang-myeon, was widened and opened, while the existing 9.8 km section was abolished.
- October 16, 2013: The 5.5 km section between Yogwang-ri, Chubu-myeon, Geumsan County, South Chungcheong Province, and Sajeong-ri, Gunseo-myeon, Okcheon County, North Chungcheong Province, was widened and opened, while the existing 5.0 km section was abolished.
- October 31, 2013: The 5.4 km Goje–Mupung road between Gaemyeong-ri, Goje-myeon, Geochang County, and Samgeori, Mupung-myeon, Muju County, was widened and opened, while the existing 4.6 km section over Sinpungnyeong was abolished.
- December 9, 2015: The 8.32 km Yeoju IC–Janghowon road between Deokpyeong-ri, Jeomdong-myeon, Yeoju City, and Jeombong-dong, was widened and opened, while the existing 8.34 km section was abolished.
- December 30, 2015: The 5.2 km Yeoju–Yangpyeong road between Bulgok-ri, Gaegun-myeon, and Baegan-ri, Yangpyeong-eup, Yangpyeong County, was widened and opened.
- January 27, 2016: A 1.8 km section of Construction Section 2 of the Jeokseong–Jeongok road between Namgye-ri, Gunam-myeon, and Dongi-ri, Misan-myeon, Yeoncheon County, was widened and opened.
- January 28, 2016: Following the opening of the Yeoju–Yangpyeong road, the former national highway section between Hoehyeon-ri and Yanggeun-ri, Yangpyeong-eup, Yangpyeong County, measuring 5.8 km, was abolished.
- November 15, 2016: A total 4.04 km section of the Jeokseong–Jeongok road between Hwangji-ri and Namgye-ri, Gunam-myeon, Yeoncheon County, and between Dongi-ri, Misan-myeon, Yeoncheon County, and Eoyu-ri, Jeokseong-myeon, Paju City, was temporarily opened.
- April 20, 2018: A 3.26 km section of Construction Section 1 of the Jeokseong–Jeongok road between Hwangji-ri, Gunam-myeon, Yeoncheon County, and Eundae-ri, Jeongok-eup, was widened and opened.
- November 13, 2018: A 5.67 km section of the Jeokseong–Jeongok road between Gueup-ri and Eoyu-ri, Jeokseong-myeon, Paju City, was widened and opened, while the existing 4.8 km section between Gueup-ri and Janghyeon-ri was abolished.
- December 4, 2018: A 2.48 km section of the Jeokseong–Jeongok road between Jangtan-ri, Cheongsan-myeon, Yeoncheon County, and Eundae-ri, Jeongok-eup, was widened and opened, while the existing 13.4 km section between Jangtan-ri and Janghyeon-ri, Jeokseong-myeon, Paju City, was abolished.
- December 20, 2018: The 16.7 km Okcheon–Boeun road between Sojeong-ri, Gunbuk-myeon, Okcheon County, and Geumgul-ri, Boeun-eup, was widened and opened. The existing 1.3 km section between Janggye-ri and Inpo-ri, Annae-myeon, Okcheon County, and the existing 12.9 km section between Jeongbang-ri, Annae-myeon, and Balsan-ri, Suhan-myeon, Boeun County, were abolished.
- December 16, 2019: The 10.4 km Jeongok–Yeongjung road between Yangmun-ri, Yeongjung-myeon, and Juwon-ri, Changsu-myeon, Pocheon City, was widened and opened.
- June 30, 2020: The 3.5 km section of the Jeongok–Yeongjung road between Baekui-ri and Jangtan-ri, Cheongsan-myeon, Yeoncheon County, was widened and opened.
- December 2, 2020: Following the opening of the Jeongok–Yeongjung road, the existing 7.5 km section between Seongdong-ri, Yeongjung-myeon, and Juwon-ri, Changsu-myeon, Pocheon City, and the existing 2.6 km section between Baekui-ri and Jangtan-ri, Cheongsan-myeon, Yeoncheon County, were abolished.
- August 31, 2021: The 9.7 km Goesan–Eumseong road between Aseong-ri, Soso-myeon, Goesan County, and Hano-ri, Wonnam-myeon, Eumseong County, was widened and opened, while the existing 6.3 km section between Aseong-ri and Hadang-ri, Wonnam-myeon, was abolished.

== Main stopovers ==
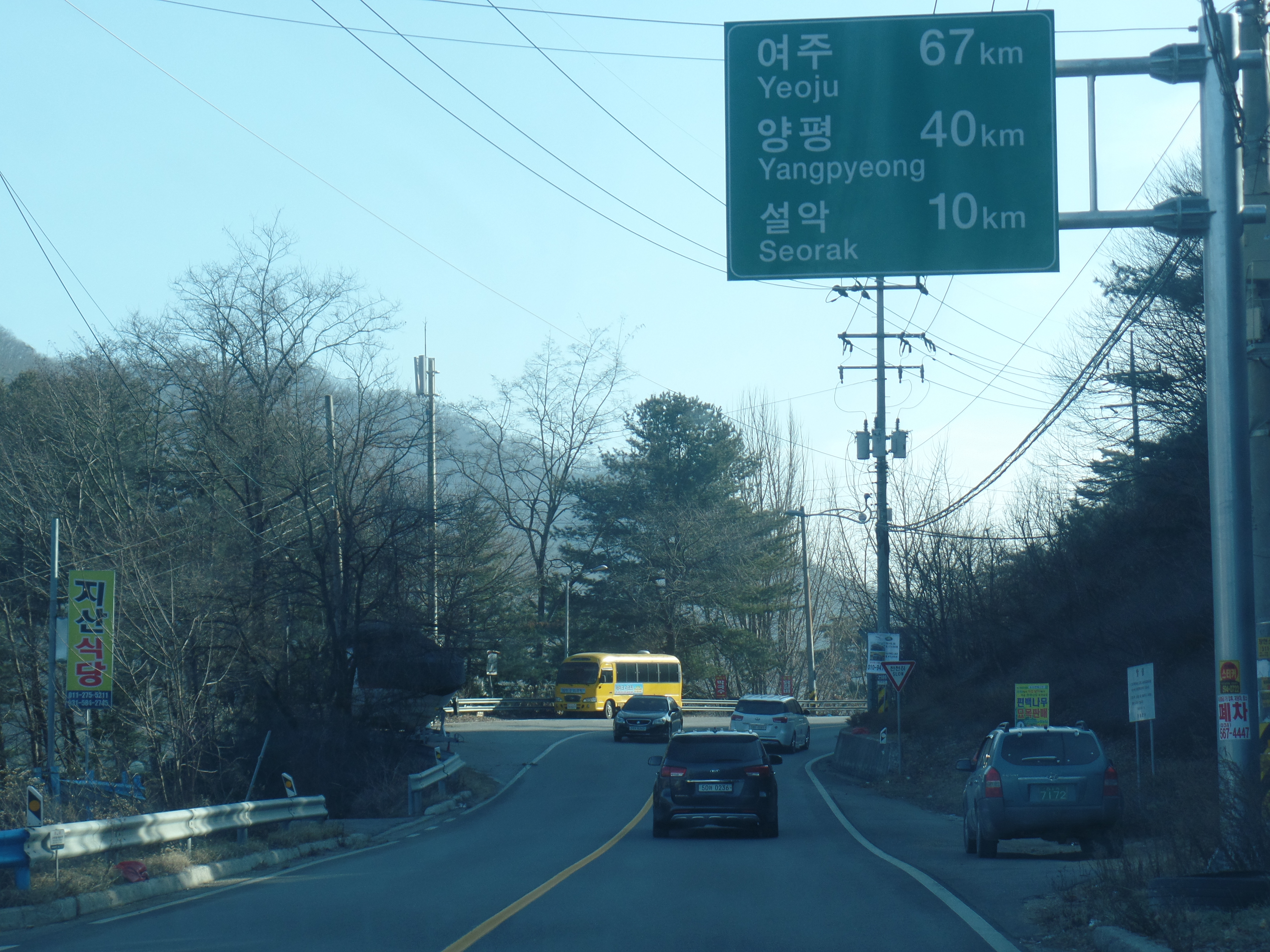
National Route 37 sign at Gapyeong County.

South Gyeongsang Province

- Geochang

North Jeolla Province

- Muju

South Chungcheong Province

- Geumsan

North Chungcheong Province

- Okcheon - Boeun

North Gyeongsang Province

- Sangju

North Chungcheong Province

- Goesan - Eumseong

Gyeonggi Province

- Icheon - Yeoju - Yangpyeong - Gapyeong - Pocheon - Yeoncheon - Paju

== Major intersections ==
- (■): Expressway

IS: Intersection, IC: Interchange

=== South Gyeongsang Province ===
Name	Hangul name	Connection	Location		Note
Jeolbu IS	절부사거리		Geochang County	Geochang-eup	Terminus; National Route 24, National Route 26 overlap
Songjeong IS	송정 교차로	National Route 3 (Ongjang-ro)	Geochang County	Geochang-eup	National Route 3, National Route 24, National Route 26 overlap
Geoyeol Tunnel	거열터널		Geochang County	Geochang-eup	National Route 3, National Route 24, National Route 26 overlap Approximately 544m
Jangbaek Tunnel			Geochang County	Geochang-eup	National Route 3, National Route 24, National Route 26 overlap Approximately 639m
Jangbaek Tunnel			Geochang County	Mari-myeon	National Route 3, National Route 24, National Route 26 overlap Approximately 639m
Maheul IS	말흘 교차로	Geoan-ro	Geochang County	Mari-myeon	National Route 3, National Route 24, National Route 26 overlap
Jidong IS	지동 교차로	Geoan-ro	Geochang County	Mari-myeon	National Route 3, National Route 24, National Route 26 overlap
Mari IS	마리삼거리	Geoan-ro	Geochang County	Mari-myeon	
Mari-myeon Office Mari Elementary School	마리면사무소 마리초등학교		Geochang County	Mari-myeon	
Jangpung IS	장풍삼거리	Prefectural Route 37 (Songgye-ro)	Geochang County	Mari-myeon	
Jangpung Bridge	장풍교		Geochang County	Mari-myeon	
Dangsan IS	당산삼거리	Modong-gil	Geochang County	Wicheon-myeon	
Modong Clinic	모동보건진료소		Geochang County	Wicheon-myeon	
Wandae IS	완대삼거리	Prefectural Route 1089 (Jugok-ro)	Geochang County	Jusang-myeon	Prefectural Route 1089 overlap
Geumgye Bridge IS	금계교 동단	Prefectural Route 1089 (Goje-ro)	Geochang County	Goje-myeon	Prefectural Route 1089 overlap
Gaemyeong Clinic	개명보건진료소		Geochang County	Goje-myeon	
No name	(이름 없음)	Prefectural Route 1001 (Songgye-ro)	Geochang County	Goje-myeon	
Bbaejae Tunnel	빼재터널		Geochang County	Goje-myeon	Approximately 1765m

=== North Jeolla Province ===
Name	Hangul name	Connection	Location		Note
Bbaejae Tunnel	빼재터널		Muju County	Mupung-myeon	Approximately 1765m
Tobiseu Condo	토비스콘도		Muju County	Mupung-myeon	
Sangojeong IS	상오정삼거리	Odujae-ro	Muju County	Mupung-myeon	
Samgong IS	삼공삼거리	Gucheondong 1-ro	Muju County	Seolcheon-myeon	
Gucheon Elementary School	구천초등학교		Muju County	Seolcheon-myeon	
Rijoteu IS	리조트삼거리	Manseon-ro	Muju County	Seolcheon-myeon	
Baebang IS	배방 교차로	Prefectural Route 49 (Chimajae-ro) (Chimajae 1-ro)	Muju County	Seolcheon-myeon	Prefectural Route 49 overlap
Rajetongmun IS	라제통문삼거리	National Route 30 (Rajetongmun-ro)	Muju County	Seolcheon-myeon	National Route 30 overlap Prefectural Route 49 overlap
Seolcheon-myeon Office Seolcheon Elementary School Seolcheon Bus Terminal Muju BandiLand	설천면사무소 설천초등학교 설천공용터미널 무주반디랜드		Muju County	Seolcheon-myeon	National Route 30 overlap Prefectural Route 49 overlap
Muhang IS	무항삼거리	Prefectural Route 49; Prefectural Route 581 (Minjujisan-ro)	Muju County	Seolcheon-myeon	National Route 30 overlap Prefectural Route 49 overlap
No name	(이름 없음)	Sangjangbaek-gil	Muju County	Muju-eup	National Route 30 overlap
Jangbaek Bridge	장백교		Muju County	Muju-eup	National Route 30 overlap
Muju 2 IS	무주2 교차로	National Route 19 (Muju-ro); Museol-ro	Muju County	Muju-eup	National Route 19, 30 overlap
Chilri 1 Bridge Chilri 2 Bridge	칠리1교 칠리2교		Muju County	Muju-eup	National Route 19, 30 overlap
Muju 1 IS	무주1 교차로	National Route 19 (Muju-ro); Prefectural Route 727 (Goemok-ro) (Hanpungnu-ro)	Muju County	Muju-eup	National Route 19, 30 overlap
Dangsan IS	당산 교차로	Hanpungnu-ro	Muju County	Muju-eup	National Route 19, 30 overlap
Ssarijae Tunnel	싸리재터널		Muju County	Muju-eup	National Route 19, 30 overlap Approximately 385m
Gaok IS	가옥 교차로	National Route 19; National Route 30 (Muju-ro)	Muju County	Muju-eup	National Route 19, 30 overlap
Neulmok IS	늘목삼거리	Sambang-ro	Muju County	Muju-eup	
Yongpo Bridge Jamdu 1 Bridge	용포교 잠두1교		Muju County	Muju-eup	
Jamdu 2 Bridge			Muju County	Muju-eup	
Jamdu 2 Bridge			Muju County	Bunam-myeon	
Gulam IS	굴암삼거리	Gulam-ro	Muju County	Bunam-myeon	
Gajeong IS	가정삼거리	Bunam-ro	Muju County	Bunam-myeon	

=== South Chungcheong Province ===
Name	Hangul name	Connection	Location		Note
Hyeonnae IS	현내삼거리	Hyeonnae-ro	Geumsan County	Buri-myeon	
Yanggok IS	양곡사거리	Prefectural Route 601 (Jeokbyeokgang-ro)	Geumsan County	Buri-myeon	
Buri Police Station IS	부리파출소앞 교차로	Jeokbyeokgang-ro	Geumsan County	Buri-myeon	
Cheongpung Seowon	청풍서원		Geumsan County	Buri-myeon	
Hwangpung Bridge	황풍교		Geumsan County	Namil-myeon	
Hwangpung Bridge IS	황풍교 교차로	Bonghwang-ro	Geumsan County	Namil-myeon	
Sampung IS	삼풍삼거리	Sampung-ro	Geumsan County	Geumsan-eup	
Expo IS	엑스포삼거리	Insamgwangjang-ro	Geumsan County	Geumsan-eup	
Singeumcheon Bridge	신금천대교		Geumsan County	Geumsan-eup	
Jungdo 5 ways IS	중도오거리	Prefectural Route 68 (Insam-ro); Insamgwangjang-ro	Geumsan County	Geumsan-eup	
Yangjeon IS	양전삼거리	National Route 13 (Geumsan-ro)	Geumsan County	Geumseong-myeon	
Jisacheon Bridge			Geumsan County	Geumseong-myeon	
Jisacheon Bridge			Geumsan County	Gunbuk-myeon	
Uichong IS	의총삼거리	Bumal-gil; Uichong-gil	Geumsan County	Gunbuk-myeon	
Saemal IS	새말사거리	Eopilgang-ro; Ilheunijae-ro	Geumsan County	Gunbuk-myeon	
Ginseng Tower IS	인삼탑 교차로	Eopilgang-ro	Geumsan County	Gunbuk-myeon	
Hasinri IS	하신리 교차로	Eopilgang-ro	Geumsan County	Geumseong-myeon	
Chujeong IS	추정삼거리	Chupung-ro	Geumsan County	Chubu-myeon	
Majeon IS	마전 교차로	National Route 17 (Sungam-ro)	Geumsan County	Chubu-myeon	National Route 17 overlap
Chubu IC	추부 나들목	Tongyeong–Daejeon Expressway	Geumsan County	Chubu-myeon	National Route 17 overlap
Maeum IS	마음 교차로	Seodaesan-ro; Chupung-ro	Geumsan County	Chubu-myeon	National Route 17 overlap
Yokwang IS	요광 교차로	National Route 17 (Geumsan-ro)	Geumsan County	Chubu-myeon	National Route 17 overlap
Sinpyeong IS	신평 교차로	Seodaesan-ro	Geumsan County	Chubu-myeon	
Sinpyeong Tunnel	신평터널		Geumsan County	Chubu-myeon	Approximately 1010m

=== North Chungcheong Province (South Sangju) ===
Name	Hangul name	Connection	Location		Note
Sinpyeong Tunnel	신평터널		Okcheon County	Gunseo-myeon	Approximately 1010m
Sangbok IS	상복 교차로	Seongwang-ro	Okcheon County	Gunseo-myeon	
Dongpyeong IS	동평사거리	Gollyong-ro	Okcheon County	Gunseo-myeon	
Gunseo IS	군서 교차로	Seongwang-ro	Okcheon County	Gunseo-myeon	
Odong IS	오동 교차로	Odong 2-gil	Okcheon County	Gunseo-myeon	
Odong Bridge	오동교		Okcheon County	Gunseo-myeon	
Odong Tunnel	오동터널		Okcheon County	Gunseo-myeon	Right tunnel: Approximately 230m Left tunnel: Approximately 211m
Woljeon Bridge	월전교		Okcheon County	Gunseo-myeon	
Woljeon IS	월전 교차로	Seongwang-ro	Okcheon County	Gunseo-myeon	
Seohwa Bridge			Okcheon County	Gunseo-myeon	
Seohwa Bridge			Okcheon County	Okcheon-eup	
Seojeong 1 IS	서정1 교차로	National Route 4 (Okcheon-ro)	Okcheon County	Okcheon-eup	
Seojeong Bridge	서정대교		Okcheon County	Okcheon-eup	
Okgak IS	옥각 교차로	Okji-ro	Okcheon County	Okcheon-eup	
Gukwon IS	국원 교차로	Seongwang-ro	Okcheon County	Gunbuk-myeon	
Sojeong IS	소정 교차로	Seongwang-ro	Okcheon County	Gunbuk-myeon	
Janggye Bridge	장계교		Okcheon County	Annae-myeon	
Inpo IS	인포삼거리	Prefectural Route 575 (Annam-ro)	Okcheon County	Annae-myeon	Prefectural Route 575 overlap
Hyeonri IS	현리삼거리	Prefectural Route 502; Prefectural Route 575 (Annaesuhan-ro)	Okcheon County	Annae-myeon	Prefectural Route 502, 575 overlap
Anae Bus Terminal	안내공용버스정류장		Okcheon County	Annae-myeon	
Jeongbang IS	정방사거리	Prefectural Route 502 (Annaesamseung-ro); Hyeolli-gil	Okcheon County	Annae-myeon	
Dongdae Health Center	동대보건진료소		Okcheon County	Annae-myeon	
Dongjin Service Area Myoseo Clinic	동진휴게소 묘서보건진료소		Boeun County	Suhan-myeon	
Sogye IS	소계삼거리	Jangseonsogye-ro	Boeun County	Suhan-myeon	
Suhan Elementary School	수한초등학교		Boeun County	Suhan-myeon	
Hupyeong IS	후평사거리	National Route 25 (Bocheong-daero); Jangsin-ro	Boeun County	Suhan-myeon	National Route 25 overlap
Jangsin Bridge			Boeun County	Suhan-myeon	National Route 25 overlap
Jangsin Bridge			Boeun County	Boeun-eup	National Route 25 overlap
Jangsin IS	장신사거리	Samsanjebang-ro; Jangsokjungcho-ro	Boeun County	Boeun-eup	National Route 25 overlap
Boeun KT Office Boeun Health Center	KT 보은지사 보은군 보건소		Boeun County	Boeun-eup	National Route 25 overlap
Gyosa IS	교사사거리	Boeun-ro	Boeun County	Boeun-eup	National Route 25 overlap
Ipyeong Bridge IS	이평교사거리	Nambu-ro	Boeun County	Boeun-eup	National Route 25 overlap
Ipyeong IS	이평삼거리	Baetdeul-ro	Boeun County	Boeun-eup	National Route 25 overlap
Guncheong IS	군청사거리	Guncheong-gil; Marudeul-gil	Boeun County	Boeun-eup	National Route 25 overlap
Boeun IS	보은 교차로	National Route 19 (Boeunmiwon-ro)	Boeun County	Boeun-eup	National Route 25 overlap
Nucheong IS	누청삼거리	National Route 25 (Bocheong-daero)	Boeun County	Boeun-eup	National Route 25 overlap
Seongjok IS	성족삼거리	Jonggok-gil	Boeun County	Boeun-eup	
Donghak Tunnel	동학터널		Boeun County	Boeun-eup	Approximately 204m
Songni Tunnel			Boeun County	Boeun-eup	Approximately 1198m
Songni Tunnel			Boeun County	Songnisan-myeon	Approximately 1198m
Jungpan IS	중판삼거리	Prefectural Route 505 (Songnisan-ro)	Boeun County	Songnisan-myeon	
Hapan Bridge	하판교		Boeun County	Songnisan-myeon	
Baekseok IS	백석삼거리	Naebuksanoe-ro	Boeun County	Sanoe-myeon	
Janggap IS	장갑삼거리	Prefectural Route 575 (Sanoe-ro)	Boeun County	Sanoe-myeon	
Chungbuk Alps Natural Recreation Forest	충북알프스자연휴양림		Boeun County	Sanoe-myeon	

=== North Gyeongsang Province ===
Name	Hangul name	Connection	Location		Note
Yonghwa IS	용화삼거리	Prefectural Route 997 (Yonghwa-ro)	Sangju City	Hwabuk-myeon	
Hwabuk Elementary School	화북초등학교 용화분교장		Sangju City	Hwabuk-myeon	
Yonghwa Bridge	용화교		Sangju City	Hwabuk-myeon	

=== North Chungcheong Province (North Sangju) ===
Name	Hangul name	Connection	Location		Note
Sinwol Clinic	신월보건진료소		Goesan County	Cheongcheon-myeon	
Gangpyeong Bridge	강평교		Goesan County	Cheongcheon-myeon	
Hupyeong IS	후평삼거리	Hupyeongdowon-ro	Goesan County	Cheongcheon-myeon	
Cheongcheon IS	청천삼거리	Prefectural Route 575 (Geumgwan-ro)	Goesan County	Cheongcheon-myeon	
Cheongcheon IS	청천사거리	Prefectural Route 32 (Goesan-ro)	Goesan County	Cheongcheon-myeon	Prefectural Route 32 overlap
Geumpyeong IS	금평삼거리	Prefectural Route 32 (Hwayang-ro)	Goesan County	Cheongcheon-myeon	Prefectural Route 32 overlap
Buheung Health Subcenter	부흥보건지소		Goesan County	Cheongan-myeon	
Buheung IS	부흥사거리	National Route 19 (Goesan-ro); Prefectural Route 592 (Jilma-ro)	Goesan County	Cheongan-myeon	National Route 19 overlap
Jigyeong IS	지경삼거리	Prefectural Route 515 (Dogyeong-ro)	Goesan County	Cheongcheon-myeon	National Route 19 overlap Prefectural Route 515 overlap
Jingyeong 2 IS	진경2삼거리	Prefectural Route 515 (Jangam-ro)	Goesan County	Mungwang-myeon	National Route 19 overlap Prefectural Route 515 overlap
Gultijae	굴티재		Goesan County	Mungwang-myeon	National Route 19 overlap
Mungwang IS	문광삼거리	Prefectural Route 49 (Songmun-ro)	Goesan County	Mungwang-myeon	National Route 19 overlap Prefectural Route 49 overlap
Mungwang Elementary School	문광초등학교		Goesan County	Mungwang-myeon	National Route 19 overlap Prefectural Route 49 overlap
Gwangdeok IS	광덕삼거리	Gwangdeok-gil	Goesan County	Mungwang-myeon	National Route 19 overlap Prefectural Route 49 overlap
Mungwang Bridge			Goesan County	Mungwang-myeon	National Route 19 overlap Prefectural Route 49 overlap
Mungwang Bridge			Goesan County	Goesan-eup	National Route 19 overlap Prefectural Route 49 overlap
Goesan Middle School	괴산중학교		Goesan County	Goesan-eup	National Route 19 overlap Prefectural Route 49 overlap
Daesa IS	대사삼거리	Eumnae-ro	Goesan County	Goesan-eup	National Route 19 overlap Prefectural Route 49 overlap
Geumsan IS	금산삼거리	Eumnae-ro 2-gil	Goesan County	Goesan-eup	National Route 19 overlap Prefectural Route 49 overlap
Goesan County Hall Goesan Bus Terminal	괴산군민회관 괴산시외버스공용터미널		Goesan County	Goesan-eup	National Route 19 overlap Prefectural Route 49 overlap
Clock Tower IS	시계탑사거리	Eumnae-ro; Eumnae-ro 11-gil	Goesan County	Goesan-eup	National Route 19 overlap Prefectural Route 49 overlap
Goesan Fire Station	괴산119안전센터		Goesan County	Goesan-eup	National Route 19 overlap Prefectural Route 49 overlap
Daedeok IS Dongjin IS	대덕사거리 동진 교차로	National Route 19; National Route 34 (Jungbu-ro); Jewol-ro	Goesan County	Goesan-eup	National Route 19 overlap National Route 34 overlap Prefectural Route 49 overlap
Dongbu IS	동부 교차로	Munmu-ro	Goesan County	Goesan-eup	National Route 34 overlap Prefectural Route 49 overlap
Goesan IS	괴산 교차로	National Route 34 (Jungbu-ro)	Goesan County	Goesan-eup	National Route 34 overlap Prefectural Route 49 overlap
Aseong IS	아성삼거리	Imkkeokjeong-ro	Goesan County	Sosu-myeon	Prefectural Route 49 overlap
Goma IS	고마삼거리	Wonso-ro	Goesan County	Sosu-myeon	Prefectural Route 49 overlap
Ipam IS	입암 교차로	Sosu-ro	Goesan County	Sosu-myeon	Prefectural Route 49 overlap
Chansaem IS	찬샘 교차로	Prefectural Route 510 (Sosu-ro); Gilseon 2-gil	Goesan County	Sosu-myeon	Prefectural Route 49 overlap Prefectural Route 510 overlap
Gilseon-ri	(길선리)	Prefectural Route 510 (Gilseon-gil)	Goesan County	Sosu-myeon	Prefectural Route 49 overlap Prefectural Route 510 overlap
Guan IS	구안삼거리	Prefectural Route 49 (Chungdo-ro)	Eumseong County	Wonnam-myeon	Prefectural Route 49 overlap
Hadang Overpass	하당육교		Eumseong County	Wonnam-myeon	
Hadang IS	하당삼거리	National Route 36 (Chungcheong-daero)	Eumseong County	Wonnam-myeon	National Route 36 overlap
Eumseong IS	음성 교차로	National Route 36 (Chungcheong-daero)	Eumseong County	Wonnam-myeon	National Route 36 overlap
Sincheon IS	신천 교차로	Prefectural Route 516 (Deoksaeng-ro)	Eumseong County	Eumseong-eup	
Soyeo IS	소여 교차로	Eumseong-ro	Eumseong County	Eumseong-eup	
Sajeong IS	사정 교차로	Sajeong-gil	Eumseong County	Eumseong-eup	
Eumseong IC	음성 나들목	Pyeongtaek–Jecheon Expressway	Eumseong County	Geumwang-eup	
Yukreong Bridge	육령교		Eumseong County	Geumwang-eup	
Mugeuk IS	무극 교차로	Prefectural Route 82 (Daegeum-ro)	Eumseong County	Geumwang-eup	
Jeongsaeng IS	정생 교차로	National Route 21	Eumseong County	Geumwang-eup	National Route 21 overlap
Dosin IS	도신 교차로	Saengsam-ro	Eumseong County	Saenggeuk-myeon	National Route 21 overlap
Byeongam IS	병암 교차로	Prefectural Route 306 (Ilsaeng-ro); Eumseong-ro	Eumseong County	Saenggeuk-myeon	National Route 21 overlap Prefectural Route 306 overlap
Saenggeuk IS	생극사거리	Osin-ro	Eumseong County	Saenggeuk-myeon	National Route 21 overlap Prefectural Route 306 overlap
Saenggeuk IS	생극 교차로	National Route 3 Prefectural Route 306 (Jungwon-daero)	Eumseong County	Saenggeuk-myeon	National Route 3, 21 overlap Prefectural Route 306 overlap
Chapyeong IS	차평 교차로	Eumseong-ro	Eumseong County	Saenggeuk-myeon	National Route 3, 21 overlap
Wondang IS	원당 교차로	Prefectural Route 520 (Wondang-gil)	Eumseong County	Gamgok-myeon	National Route 3, 21 overlap
Cheongmicheon Bridge	청미천교		Eumseong County	Gamgok-myeon	National Route 3, 21 overlap

=== Gyeonggi Province ===
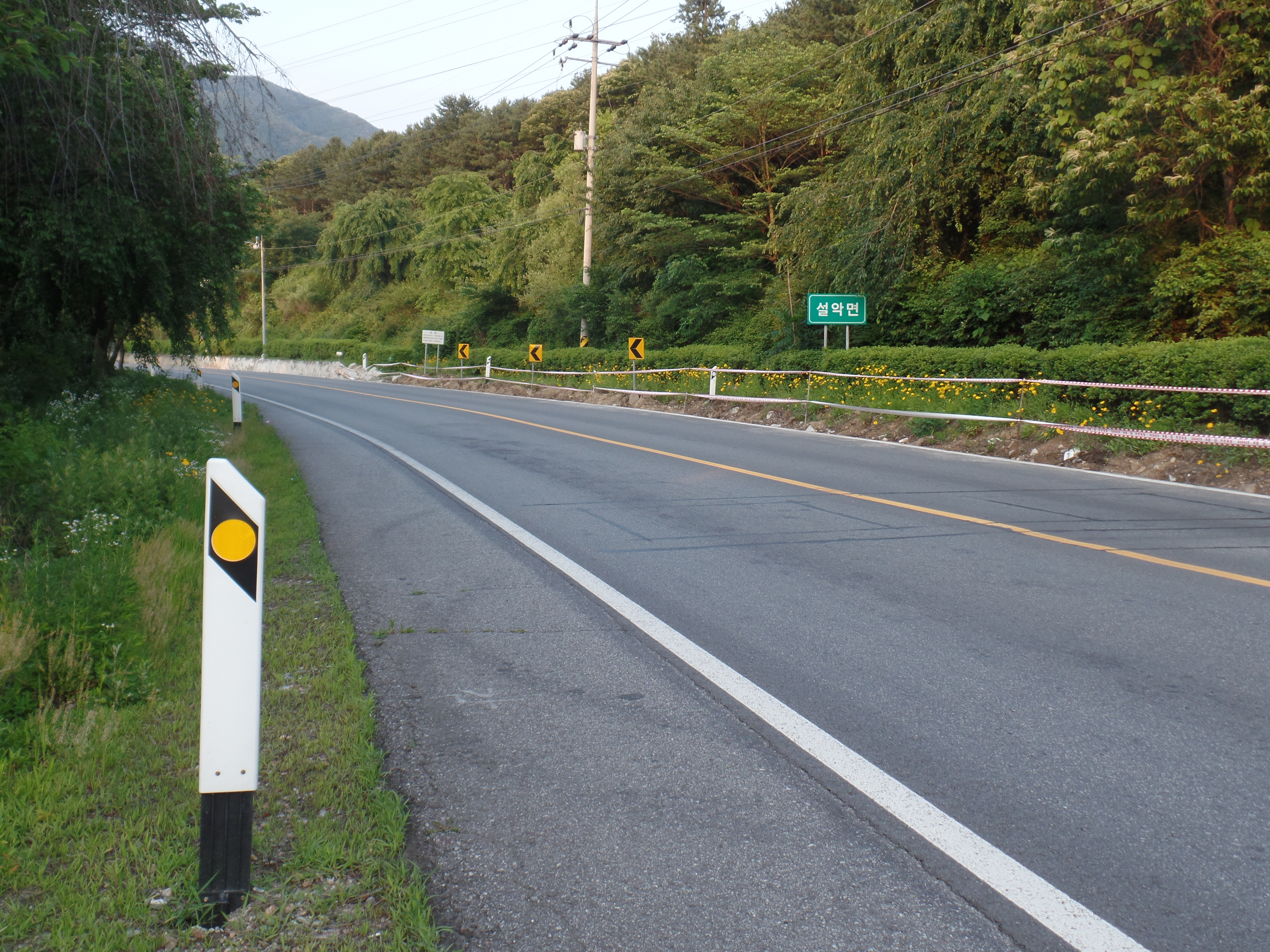
National Route 37 near Seorak-myeon

Name	Hangul name	Connection	Location		Note
Cheongmicheon Bridge	청미천교		Icheon City	Janghowon-eup	National Route 3, 21 overlap
Jinam IC	진암 나들목	National Route 3 (Jungwon-daero); National Route 38 (Seodong-daero)	Icheon City	Janghowon-eup	National Route 3, 21, 38 overlap
Janghowon-eup Office Buwon High School	장호원읍사무소 부원고등학교		Icheon City	Janghowon-eup	National Route 38 overlap
Jinam IS	진암 교차로	National Route 38 (Seodong-daero); Gyeongchung-daero	Icheon City	Janghowon-eup	National Route 38 overlap
Janghowon Elementary School	장호원초등학교		Icheon City	Janghowon-eup	
Janghowon IS	장호원삼거리	Saemjae-ro	Icheon City	Janghowon-eup	
Janghowon Bridge	장호원교 서단	Janggam-ro; Jangteo-ro 83beon-gil	Icheon City	Janghowon-eup	
Wonbu IS	원부사거리	Songsam-ro; Wonbu-ro	Yeoju City	Jeomdong-myeon	
Jeongdae Tomb and Monument	정대년신도비		Yeoju City	Jeomdong-myeon	
Deokpyeong IS	덕평삼거리	Noegok Bridge	Yeoju City	Jeomdong-myeon	
Deokpyeong IS	덕평 교차로	Deoksil-gil	Yeoju City	Jeomdong-myeon	Under construction
Bugu IS	부구 교차로	Cheongan-ro	Yeoju City	Jeomdong-myeon	Under construction
Cheongan Bridge Geumgok Bridge	청안교 금곡교		Yeoju City	Jeomdong-myeon	Geumgok Bridge is under construction
Jeomdong IS	점동사거리	Prefectural Route 84 (Ganam-ro); Jeomdong-ro	Yeoju City	Jeomdong-myeon	
Cheongan IS	청안 교차로	Jeomdong-ro	Yeoju City	Jeomdong-myeon	Under construction
Jeomdong Elementary School Jeomdong-myeon Office Jeomdong Middle School Jeomdong High School	점동초등학교 점동면사무소 점동중학교 점동고등학교		Yeoju City	Jeomdong-myeon	
Menhir IS	선돌 교차로	Cheongan-ro	Yeoju City	Jeomdong-myeon	Under construction
Cheori IS	처리 교차로	Prefectural Route 345 (Seonsa-gil)	Yeoju City	Jeomdong-myeon	
Nonjeo IS	논저 교차로	Samgyo 2-gil Samgyo 3-gil	Yeoju City	Yeoheung-dong	Under construction
Jeomdong IS	점동 교차로	Jeomgok-gil	Yeoju City	Yeoheung-dong	Under construction
Yeoju IC (Yeoju IC IS)	여주 나들목 (여주IC삼거리)	Yeongdong Expressway	Yeoju City	Yeoheung-dong	
Jeombong IS	점봉 교차로	Myeongseong-ro; Myeongpum-ro	Yeoju City	Yeoheung-dong	
Jeombong Elementary School	점봉초등학교		Yeoju City	Yeoheung-dong	
Yeoju Institute of Technology	여주대학교		Yeoju City	Jungang-dong	
Sejong Elementary School IS	세종초등학교 교차로	Sejong-ro 214beon-gil	Yeoju City	Jungang-dong	
Gyori IS	교리 교차로	National Route 42 (Yeowon-ro)	Yeoju City	Jungang-dong	National Route 42 overlap
Wolsong IS	월송 교차로	Prefectural Route 333 (Uam-ro)	Yeoju City	Jungang-dong	National Route 42 overlap
Yeongreung IS	영릉 교차로	National Route 42 (Jungbu-daero)	Yeoju City	Neungseo-myeon	National Route 42 overlap
Sejong Bridge	세종대교		Yeoju City	Jungang-dong	
Sejong Bridge			Yeoju City	Ohak-dong	
Hyeonam IS	현암 교차로	Gangbyeonbuk-ro	Yeoju City	Ohak-dong	
Gasan IS	가산 교차로	Yeoyang-ro; Gasan 1-gil Hyeonnam-gil	Yeoju City	Daesin-myeon	
Hupo Bridge Chohyeon Bridge	후포교 초현교		Yeoju City	Daesin-myeon	
Botong IS	보통 교차로	Prefectural Route 88 (Yeoyang-ro); Botong 1-gil	Yeoju City	Daesin-myeon	Prefectural Route 88 overlap
Daesin IC	대신 나들목	Gwangju-Wonju Expressway	Yeoju City	Daesin-myeon	Prefectural Route 88 overlap
Cheonseo IS	천서사거리	Prefectural Route 70; Prefectural Route 88 (Iyeo-ro) (Yeoyang 1-ro)	Yeoju City	Daesin-myeon	Prefectural Route 88 overlap
Ipobo Bridge	이포보		Yeoju City	Daesin-myeon	
Gaegun Middle School	개군중학교	Chueum-ro	Yangpyeong County	Gaegun-myeon	
Gongse IS	공세 교차로	Gaegunsan-ro; Sinnae-gil; Sinnae-gil 51beon-gil	Yangpyeong County	Gaegun-myeon	
Heukcheon Bridge			Yangpyeong County	Gaegun-myeon	
Heukcheon Bridge			Yangpyeong County	Yangpyeong-eup	
No name	(이름 없음)	Yanggeun-ro; Saemtteul-gil	Yangpyeong County	Yangpyeong-eup	
Hoehyeon IS	회현 교차로	Yanggeun-ro	Yangpyeong County	Yangpyeong-eup	
Dogok Bridge Dogokcheon Bridge	도곡교 도곡천교		Yangpyeong County	Yangpyeong-eup	
Baegan IS	백안 교차로	Jungang-ro	Yangpyeong County	Yangpyeong-eup	
Yanggeuncheon Bridge Baegan Bridge	양근천교 백안교		Yangpyeong County	Yangpyeong-eup	
Yangpyeong IS	양평 교차로	National Route 6 National Route 44 (Gyeonggang-ro)	Yangpyeong County	Yangpyeong-eup	National Route 6, 44 overlap
Sangpyeong IS	상평 교차로	National Route 6 National Route 44 (Gyeonggang-ro); Prefectural Route 98 (Mayusan-ro)	Yangpyeong County	Yangpyeong-eup	National Route 6, 44 overlap Prefectural Route 98 overlap
Sinae IS	신애삼거리	Aegok-gil	Yangpyeong County	Yangpyeong-eup	Prefectural Route 98 overlap
Baekhyeon IS	백현사거리	Goeum-ro; Yongcheol-ro	Yangpyeong County	Okcheon-myeon	Prefectural Route 98 overlap
Dongchon IS	동촌삼거리	Sinbok-gil	Yangpyeong County	Okcheon-myeon	Prefectural Route 98 overlap
Mokdong IS	복동삼거리	Sillim-gil	Yangpyeong County	Okcheon-myeon	Prefectural Route 98 overlap
Jungmisan IS	중미산삼거리	Prefectural Route 352 (Jungmisan-ro); Prefectural Route 98	Yangpyeong County	Okcheon-myeon	Prefectural Route 98 overlap
Seoneochi			Yangpyeong County	Okcheon-myeon	
Seoneochi			Gapyeong County	Seorak-myeon	
Yumyeongsan IS	유명산삼거리	Yumyeongsan-ro	Gapyeong County	Seorak-myeon	
Ananti Club Seoul	아난티클럽서울		Gapyeong County	Seorak-myeon	
Hanujae Pass	한우재고개		Gapyeong County	Seorak-myeon	
Eomso IS	엄소삼거리	Mugan-ro	Gapyeong County	Seorak-myeon	
Myeongjang IS	명장삼거리	Myeongjang-gil	Gapyeong County	Seorak-myeon	
Seorak IC (Seorak IC IS)	설악 나들목 (설악IC 교차로)	Seoul–Yangyang Expressway; Sincheonjungang-ro	Gapyeong County	Seorak-myeon	
Sincheon IS	신천삼거리	National Route 75; Prefectural Route 86 (Sincheonjungang-ro)	Gapyeong County	Seorak-myeon	Prefectural Route 86 overlap
Sol Pass	솔고개	Prefectural Route 86 (Darakjae-ro)	Gapyeong County	Seorak-myeon	Prefectural Route 86 overlap
Cheongpyeong Dam	청평댐		Gapyeong County	Seorak-myeon	
Sincheongpyeong Bridge IS	신청평대교삼거리	Prefectural Route 391 (Bukhangang-ro)	Gapyeong County	Seorak-myeon	Prefectural Route 391 overlap
Sincheongpyeong Bridge			Gapyeong County	Seorak-myeon	Prefectural Route 391 overlap
Sincheongpyeong Bridge			Gapyeong County	Oeseo-myeon	Prefectural Route 391 overlap
Sincheongpyeong Bridge IS	신청평대교앞 교차로	National Route 45; National Route 46 (Gyeongchun-ro)	Gapyeong County	Oeseo-myeon	National Route 45, 46 overlap Prefectural Route 391 overlap
Sodol Village Sincheongpyeong 1 Bridge	소돌마을앞 신청평1교		Gapyeong County	Oeseo-myeon	National Route 45, 46 overlap Prefectural Route 391 overlap
Cheongpyeong Dam Entrance IS	청평댐입구삼거리	Prefectural Route 391 (Hoban-ro)	Gapyeong County	Oeseo-myeon	National Route 45, 46 overlap Prefectural Route 391 overlap
Cheongpyeong Bridge IS	청평대교앞 교차로		Gapyeong County	Oeseo-myeon	National Route 46 overlap
Oeseo IS	청평삼거리	Gucheongpyeong-ro; Cheongpyeongjungang-ro	Gapyeong County	Oeseo-myeon	National Route 46 overlap
Cheongpyeongwit IS	청평윗삼거리	Cheongpyeongjungang-ro	Gapyeong County	Oeseo-myeon	National Route 46 overlap
Jojong Bridge Cheongpyeong Checkpoint	조종교 (청평검문소앞)	Cheonggun-ro	Gapyeong County	Oeseo-myeon	National Route 46 overlap
Hacheon IC	하천 나들목	National Route 46 (Gyeongchun-ro)	Gapyeong County	Oeseo-myeon	National Route 46 overlap
Cheongpyeong 1 Tunnel	청평1터널		Gapyeong County	Oeseo-myeon	Approximately 280m
Cheongpyeong 2 Tunnel			Gapyeong County	Oeseo-myeon	Right tunnel: Approximately 495m Left tunnel: Approximately 455m
Cheongpyeong 2 Tunnel			Gapyeong County	Sang-myeon	Right tunnel: Approximately 495m Left tunnel: Approximately 455m
Dawon IS	다원 교차로	Cheonggun-ro	Gapyeong County	Sang-myeon	
Deokhyeon IS	덕현 교차로	Noksugyegok-ro	Gapyeong County	Sang-myeon	
Sangmyeon IS	상면 교차로	Cheonggun-ro	Gapyeong County	Sang-myeon	
Sangmyeon Tunnel	상면터널		Gapyeong County	Sang-myeon	Right tunnel: Approximately 270m Left tunnel: Approximately 230m
Hangsa IS	항사 교차로	Cheonggun-ro	Gapyeong County	Sang-myeon	
Yeonha IS	연하 교차로	Prefectural Route 387 (Biryong-ro)	Gapyeong County	Sang-myeon	
Bideuk Bridge			Gapyeong County	Sang-myeon	
Bideuk Bridge			Gapyeong County	Jojong-myeon	
Taebong IS	태봉 교차로	Cheonggun-ro	Gapyeong County	Jojong-myeon	
Yulgil IS	율길 교차로	Cheonggun-ro	Gapyeong County	Sang-myeon	
Seopa IS	서파 교차로	National Route 47 (Geumgang-ro); Prefectural Route 56 (Cheonggun-ro)	Pocheon City	Naechon-myeon	National Route 47 overlap Prefectural Route 56 overlap
Bongsu IS	봉수 교차로	Bongsu-ro	Gapyeong County	Sang-myeon	National Route 47 overlap Prefectural Route 56 overlap
Unak IS	운악 교차로	Hwadong-ro	Pocheon City	Hwahyeon-myeon	National Route 47 overlap Prefectural Route 56 overlap
Hwahyeon Bridge	화현교		Pocheon City	Hwahyeon-myeon	National Route 47 overlap Prefectural Route 56 overlap
Hwahyeon IS	화현 교차로	Hwadong-ro	Pocheon City	Hwahyeon-myeon	National Route 47 overlap Prefectural Route 56 overlap
Seonchon IS	선촌 교차로		Pocheon City	Hwahyeon-myeon	National Route 47 overlap Prefectural Route 56 overlap
Ildong IS	일동 교차로	National Route 47; Prefectural Route 56 (Geumgang-ro); Sinnyeongil-ro	Pocheon City	Hwahyeon-myeon	National Route 47 overlap Prefectural Route 56 overlap
Gilmyeong IS	길명사거리	Yeongil-ro	Pocheon City	Hwahyeon-myeon	
Ildong Tunnel			Pocheon City	Hwahyeon-myeon	Approximately 1467m
Ildong Tunnel			Pocheon City	Yeongjung-myeon	Approximately 1467m
Geumju IS	금주삼거리	Yeongil-ro	Pocheon City	Yeongjung-myeon	
Manse IS	만세삼거리	National Route 43 (Hoguk-ro)	Pocheon City	Yeongjung-myeon	National Route 43 overlap
Geosa 1-ri Entrance	거사1리입구		Pocheon City	Yeongjung-myeon	National Route 43 overlap
Yangmungom Pass IS	양문곰고개삼거리	Yangmun-ro	Pocheon City	Yeongjung-myeon	National Route 43 overlap
Gom Pass	곰고개		Pocheon City	Yeongjung-myeon	National Route 43 overlap
Yangmun IS	양문사거리	Yangmun-ro 1-gil	Pocheon City	Yeongjung-myeon	National Route 43 overlap
Yangmun IS	양문삼거리	Yangmun-ro	Pocheon City	Yeongjung-myeon	National Route 43 overlap
Yangmun Complex Entrance	양문공단입구	Yangmungongdan-ro	Pocheon City	Yeongjung-myeon	National Route 43 overlap
Sinjang IS (Yeongjung Elementary School)	신장삼거리 (영중초등학교)	National Route 43; Prefectural Route 372 (Hoguk-ro)	Pocheon City	Yeongjung-myeon	National Route 43 overlap Prefectural Route 372 overlap
Yeoungsong IS	영송삼거리	Gayeong-ro	Pocheon City	Yeongjung-myeon	Prefectural Route 372 overlap
Yangpyeong Elementary School	영평초등학교		Pocheon City	Yeongjung-myeon	Prefectural Route 372 overlap
Oga IS	오가삼거리	National Route 87 (Changdong-ro)	Pocheon City	Changsu-myeon	National Route 87 overlap Prefectural Route 372 overlap
Okbyeong Bridge	옥병교		Pocheon City	Changsu-myeon	National Route 87 overlap Prefectural Route 372 overlap
Jingun Bridge IS	진군교사거리	National Route 87 (Pocheon-ro); Prefectural Route 372 (Cheongchang-ro)	Pocheon City	Changsu-myeon	National Route 87 overlap Prefectural Route 372 overlap
Sinjingun Bridge	신진군교		Pocheon City	Changsu-myeon	
Sinbaekui Bridge			Pocheon City	Changsu-myeon	
Sinbaekui Bridge			Yeoncheon County	Cheongsan-myeon	
Bakseok Pass IS (Bakseok Pass Underpass)	박석고개사거리 (박석고개지하차도)	Prefectural Route 372 (Cheongchang-ro)	Yeoncheon County	Cheongsan-myeon	
Yangchon IS	양촌삼거리	Gungpyeongcheon-gil	Yeoncheon County	Cheongsan-myeon	
Gungpyeong IS	궁평삼거리	Cheongyeon-ro	Yeoncheon County	Cheongsan-myeon	
Gotan Bridge			Yeoncheon County	Cheongsan-myeon	
Gotan Bridge			Yeoncheon County	Jeongok-eup	
Jeongokjung High School IS	전곡중고등학교 교차로	Jeoneun-gil; Eunjeollo 103 beon-gil	Yeoncheon County	Jeongok-eup	
Ongol Underpass	온골지하차도		Yeoncheon County	Jeongok-eup	
Ongol IS	온골사거리	Jeongong-ro	Yeoncheon County	Jeongok-eup	
Jeongok Bridge	전곡교	National Route 3 (Pyeonghwa-ro); Prefectural Route 372 (Cheongjeong-ro)	Yeoncheon County	Jeongok-eup	National Route 3 overlap Prefectural Route 372 overlap
Yeongdo IS	영도사거리	Jeongok-ro 161 beon-gil Pyeonghwa-ro 629 beon-gil	Yeoncheon County	Jeongok-eup	National Route 3 overlap Prefectural Route 372 overlap
Guseokgi IS	구석기사거리	Jeongogyeong-ro	Yeoncheon County	Jeongok-eup	National Route 3 overlap Prefectural Route 372 overlap
No name	(이름 없음)	National Route 3 (Pyeonghwa-ro); Prefectural Route 372 (Cheongjeong-ro)	Yeoncheon County	Jeongok-eup	National Route 3 overlap Prefectural Route 372 overlap
Prehistoric sites IS	선사유적지 교차로	Eundaeseong-ro	Yeoncheon County	Jeongok-eup	
Hantangang Tour	한탄강관광지후문	Seonsa-ro	Yeoncheon County	Jeongok-eup	
Sarang Bridge	사랑교		Yeoncheon County	Jeongok-eup	
Goneung IS	고능사거리	Goneung-ro	Yeoncheon County	Jeongok-eup	
North Pole CC (Golf course)	노스폴CC		Yeoncheon County	Jeongok-eup	
Amani Pass IS	아마니고개삼거리	Prefectural Route 375 (Yangyeon-ro)	Paju City	Jeokseong-myeon	Prefectural Route 375 overlap
Jeokam IS	적암삼거리	Yulgok-ro 3064beon-gil	Paju City	Jeokseong-myeon	Prefectural Route 375 overlap
Jeokam Elementary School	적암초등학교		Paju City	Jeokseong-myeon	Prefectural Route 375 overlap
Eoyujiri IS	어유지리삼거리	Prefectural Route 375 (Eosam-ro)	Paju City	Jeokseong-myeon	Prefectural Route 375 overlap
Eo-yu Middle School Cheongan Bridge	어유중학교 청안내교		Paju City	Jeokseong-myeon	
Gueup IS	구읍 교차로	Gueup-ro	Paju City	Jeokseong-myeon	
Gawol IS	가월 교차로	Prefectural Route 371 (Gamaksan-ro)	Paju City	Jeokseong-myeon	
Juwol IS	주월 교차로	Dalbit-gil	Paju City	Jeokseong-myeon	
Seolmacheon Bridge	설마천교		Paju City	Jeokseong-myeon	
Duji IS	두지 교차로	Prefectural Route 367 (Sotdwi-ro)	Paju City	Jeokseong-myeon	
Jajang IS	자장사거리	Guksa-ro	Paju City	Jeokseong-myeon	
Dapgok IS	답곡 교차로	Duiringgeori-gil	Paju City	Jeokseong-myeon	
Jangpa IS	장파사거리	Jajang-ro; Jangmaru-ro	Paju City	Papyeong-myeon	
Ribi IS	리비사거리	Jindong-ro	Paju City	Papyeong-myeon	
Apo IS	아포삼거리	Jangmaru-ro	Paju City	Papyeong-myeon	Connect with Geumpa IS
Nulrocheon Bridge	눌로천교		Paju City	Papyeong-myeon	
Dupo IS	두포삼거리	Cheongsong-ro	Paju City	Papyeong-myeon	
Dupo IS	두포 교차로	Papyeongsan-ro	Paju City	Papyeong-myeon	
Yulgok IS	율곡 교차로	Jangseungbaegi-ro	Paju City	Papyeong-myeon	
Yulgok 1 Bridge	율곡1교	Prefectural Route 78 (Hwaseokjeong-ro)	Paju City	Papyeong-myeon	
No name	(이름 없음)	Prefectural Route 78 (Hwaseokjeong-ro)	Paju City	Munsan-eup	
Yeou Pass IS (Tongil Viaduct)	여우고개사거리 (통일고가교)	National Route 1 (Tongil-ro)	Paju City	Munsan-eup	
Dangdong 1 Bridge	당동1교	Dangdong 2-ro	Paju City	Munsan-eup	
Dangdong IS	당동삼거리	Dangdong 1-ro	Paju City	Munsan-eup	
Samok IS	사목삼거리	Bangujeong-ro	Paju City	Munsan-eup	
Dangdong IC	당동 나들목	National Route 77 (Jayu-ro)	Paju City	Munsan-eup	Terminus

- Expressway
