= Dopiansa =

Buddhist temple in Cheorwon, South Korea

- 도피안사

Religion
- Affiliation: Buddhism
- Province: Gangwon Province

Location
- Location: Cheorwon County
- Country: South Korea
- Interactive map of Dopiansa

Architecture
- Established: 865

Dopiansa (Korean: 도피안사; Hanja: 倒彼岸寺) is a Buddhist temple in Cheorwon County, Gangwon Province, South Korea. It was founded in the 9th century. Great monk Doseon constructed a metal-made Buddhist statue to enshrine in Anyang temple. On the way to the temple, he lost the statue, which was found in the place of current Dopiansa temple. He later decided to build the temple in that place to realize that the statue picked up the site for the temple.(865) The statue is now No. 63 national treasure of South Korea with another stupa in 4.1 m figure.

In 1898, the temple was all burned but one devotee served to re-establish the whole structure and once again in 1914. During Korean War, the local area went through critical period of conflicts, just below the DMZ, which implies that the temple also got affected by war. After war, the Army battalion served themselves to construct the historic temple in 1959. Since Cheolwon is located in one of the northernmost area of South Korea, the area was originally managed by military monk within the boundary of civilian control line (CCL), which was recently lifted to freely visit the temple without special permission.

The iron Buddha at the temple is designated as a national treasure of South Korea. In fact, it was the trend in the 10th century to make Buddhist statues in metal, whereas metallic grand pedestal is highly rare to behold. The record of production is inscribed at the back of the statue of Buddha, telling that it was built in 5th year of King Gyeongmun of Silla.

== See also ==
- National Treasures of South Korea
- Korean Demilitarized Zone
