= Gadeok Island Airport =

Future airport to serve Busan, South Korea

Gadeok Island New Airport 가덕도신공항
- IATA: none; ICAO: none

Summary
- Airport type: Public / Military
- Serves: Busan–Gyeongnam Area and Gyeongsang Province
- Location: Gadeokdo
- Opened: Estimated 2035
- Time zone: KST (UTC+09:00)
- Coordinates: 34°59′57″N 128°49′53″E
- Website: www.busan.go.kr/newairport/index

Map
- Location of airport in South Korea

- Gadeok Island Airport
- Hangul: 가덕도신공항
- Hanja: 加德島新空港
- RR: Gadeokdo singonghang
- MR: Kadŏkto sin'gonghang

Gadeok Island New Airport (Korean: 가덕도신공항; Hanja: 加德島新空港) is a planned international airport currently under construction on Gadeokdo, an island of Busan, Gyeongnam, South Korea. Upon completion, the airport will replace functions of Gimhae International Airport, including handling international flights. It could also replace functions of Gimhae Air Base.

== History ==
In 1992, the city of Busan released an urban plan which discussed the need for a new airport in the region. In 2002, Air China Flight 129 crashed into Mount Dotdae near Gimhae International Airport in Busan, which accelerated discussion about a new airport located away from mountainous areas.

The planning of a new airport began during the Roh Moo-hyun administration of 2003–2008 to aid in dispersing increasing air traffic from the Gimhae International Airport, which remains the only international airport in the southern region of South Korea.

By 2012, the government under Lee Myung-bak abandoned plans to pursue a new airport in the region. This decision was challenged by then presidential candidate, Park Geun-hye, who stated a new airport was essential. During the Park Geun-hye administration, efforts were instead redirected to expansion of the Gimhae International Airport.

In 2014, a government commissioned report indicated that a new airport in the Yeongnam region would be required as flights continued to increase. In 2013, Gimhae International Airport attracted 9.6 million visitors and was projected to be saturated by 2023. A debate began amongst cities such as Busan and Daegu about the location of a new airport.

During the 2017 South Korean presidential election, Presidential candidate Moon Jae-in promised to build a new airport at Gadeokdo.

During the 2021 mayoral by-election in Busan, both the ruling Democratic Party of Korea and opposition People Power party agreed on fast-tracking airport development.

In April 2022, President Moon Jae-in stressed the importance of speeding up the development of the new international airport and plans for a new airport were announced. The plans included construction of South Korea's first floating airport which would be located both on the land and sea off the island of Gadeok with a proposed opening in 2035. Construction is estimated to be over ₩13.7 trillion won (US$10.64 billion).

Opening of the first runway was later changed to 2029. The fast-tracking aimed to assist Busan in winning its bid for the 2030 World Expo (later lost to Riyadh). Opening of the second runway was scheduled for 2031.

On 2 January 2024, then Democratic Party leader and future president of South Korea Lee Jae Myung was stabbed while visiting the airport construction site in an attempted assassination.

In April 2025, it was announced that construction of the airport would be delayed following the withdrawal of Hyundai Engineering & Construction from the project. Revised estimates placed the airport’s opening between 2035 and 2040.

In June 2025, the Busan Metropolitan Government began negotiations over compensation for landowners whose property was required for the airport. The government also stated that it would begin a bidding process in July to select new construction firms to continue the project. The target opening year was revised to 2032.

In November 2025, the government announced plans to reopen bidding within the year, with the goal of beginning construction in 2026. The airport’s opening was then projected for 2035. Numerous design challenges were cited as reasons for the delays, which included soft ground and flood risks. Additionally, the presence of a nearby migratory bird habitat raised concerns about potential bird strikes.

In December 2025, the projected cost of the airport increased from ₩10.5 trillion won to approximately ₩10.7 trillion won. On December 29, a bid notice was issued for construction companies, with a submission deadline of January 16, 2026.

By February 2026, two rounds of bidding for the site development had been completed. The second round was declared unsuccessful due to a lack of competition, as only one consortium submitted a bid. Under Korean public procurement law, competitive bidding requires at least two separate bidders. The Gadeokdo New Airport Construction Authority then began reviewing whether to issue a third public notice or proceed with a negotiated contract.

== Design ==
The airport will include a 3,500-metre (11,500 ft) runway, designed to accommodate larger freighter models including the Boeing 747-400F. The airport will be designed with a category II instrument landing system, with plans to upgrade to a category III. The airport will include seawalls projected to withstand 100-year wave impacts.

The designed is stated to include renewable energy sources and sustainable aviation fuel for aircraft operations.

It will have parking lots for 11,024 vehicles and an airport apron to hold 58 aircraft and would expand its capacity to hold 209 aircraft. It will have two taxiways, six rapid-exit taxiways, and four right-angle taxiways.

The airport will host a ferry terminal to connect passengers to Ulsan, Haeundae, and Yeosu. An additional 16.53 km of railway may also be built, which could be accessible via the Bujeon and Gyeongbu railway lines. The airport may also use the upcoming EMU-320 passenger train. An additional 9.8 km of road will also be constructed to connect the airport to the existing expressway.

The estimated airport demand forecast for 2065 is 23.26 million international passengers per year, and 335,000 tons of international cargo per year.

=== Naming ===
The name of the airport has yet to be officially determined. It has been proposed that the airport be named the "Yi Sun-sin International Airport". The name refers to Yi Sun-sin, a 16th-century Korean admiral and military general. If adopted, it would be the first airport in South Korea named after a historic figure.
