= Gadeokdo =

Island of Busan, South Korea

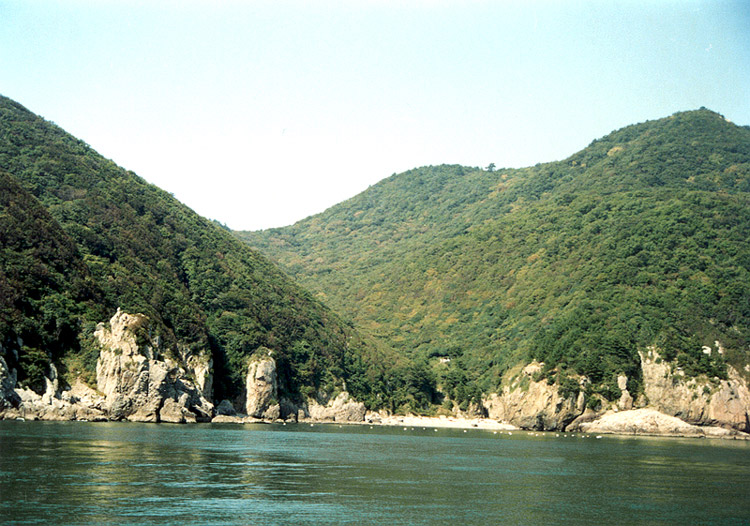
- Gadeokdo in 2023
- Interactive map of Gadeokdo

Geography
- Coordinates: 35°1′48″N 128°49′48″E

Korean name
- Hangul: 가덕도
- Hanja: 加德島
- RR: Gadeokdo
- MR: Kadŏkto

Gadeokdo (Korean: 가덕도) is an island of Busan, South Korea. Gadeokdo is the largest island of Busan. It is connected to the mainland by the Gadeok Bridge and Nulcha Bridge. It is connected to Geojedo by the Busan-Geoje Fixed Link.

In April 2022, plans for a new airport were announced. The plans included construction of the Gadeok Island Airport, which will be South Korea's first floating airport and will be located both on the land and sea off Gadeokdo
